= United States at the 2012 Summer Olympics =

- Flag of the United States
- IOC code: USA
- NOC: United States Olympic Committee

in London
- Competitors: 530 (262 men and 268 women) in 31 sports
- Flag bearers: Mariel Zagunis (opening); Bryshon Nellum (closing)
- Medals Ranked 1st: Gold 48 Silver 26 Bronze 32 Total 106

Summer Olympics appearances (overview)
- 1896; 1900; 1904; 1908; 1912; 1920; 1924; 1928; 1932; 1936; 1948; 1952; 1956; 1960; 1964; 1968; 1972; 1976; 1980; 1984; 1988; 1992; 1996; 2000; 2004; 2008; 2012; 2016; 2020; 2024; 2028

Other related appearances
- 1906 Intercalated Games

The United States of America (USA), represented by the United States Olympic Committee (USOC), competed at the 2012 Summer Olympics in London, from July 27 to August 12, 2012. U.S. athletes have competed at every Summer Olympic Games in the modern era, except the 1980 Summer Olympics in Moscow which they boycotted in protest of the Soviet invasion of Afghanistan. The USOC sent a total of 530 athletes to the Games, 262 men and 268 women, to compete in 25 sports. For the first time in its Olympic history, the United States was represented by more female than male athletes.

U.S. athletes left London with a total of 105 medals (48 gold, 26 silver and 31 bronze), finishing at the top of the gold and overall medal standings. The 48-gold medal record was the most the United States had ever won in any Olympics in which it was not the host nation. At least one medal was awarded to U.S. athletes in sixteen sports, thirteen of which contained at least one gold. U.S. athletes dominated the nations' medal standings in swimming, wherein they won a total of 31 medals, including 16 golds. Twenty-seven U.S. athletes won more than a single medal. The U.S. team-based athletes also proved particularly successful, as the women's soccer, water polo, and volleyball teams won gold and silver medals, respectively. Furthermore, the men's and women's basketball teams managed to defend their titles from Beijing. For the first time since 1936, no U.S. athlete won an Olympic medal in sailing.

Among the nation's medalists were swimmers Missy Franklin, Allison Schmitt and Ryan Lochte, who each won a total of five medals. Swimmer Nathan Adrian and platform diver David Boudia won gold medals in their respective individual events after 24-year-long non-successes. Meanwhile, tennis player Serena Williams followed her sister's success by winning the gold medal in the women's tennis singles event. Gymnast Gabby Douglas became the fourth U.S. female to win a gold medal in the individual all-around event. Allyson Felix became the most successful U.S. track-and-field athlete at the event, winning three gold medals. Swimmer Michael Phelps emerged as the most decorated athlete in Olympic history, with a total of 22 medals won (including four gold and two silver medals in London) – 18 gold, 2 silver and 2 bronze medals – surpassing Larisa Latynina's overall Olympic medal count.

After the disqualification of Russian Ivan Ukhov for doping, Erik Kynard has finally got upgraded from silver to gold, which makes it the 47th US gold medal at these Games, the best American result in terms of gold medals in the Summer Olympics held outside of the United States. Lashinda Demus was promoted to the gold medal as well after another Russian, Natalya Antyukh, was found guilty of doping, bringing the total to 48 gold medals. Those events occurred in 2019 and 2024, respectively, as retests of drug samples from the Olympics indicated widespread Russian state-sponsored doping.

== Medalists ==
The following U.S. competitors won medals at the games. In the by discipline sections below, medalists' names are bolded.

Medal	Name	Sport	Event	Date
Gold	Ryan Lochte	Swimming	Men's 400 m individual medley	July 28
Gold	Kim Rhode	Shooting	Women's skeet	July 29
Gold	Dana Vollmer	Swimming	Women's 100 m butterfly	July 29
Gold	Matt Grevers	Swimming	Men's 100 m backstroke	July 30
Gold	Missy Franklin	Swimming	Women's 100 m backstroke	July 30
Gold	Gabby Douglas; McKayla Maroney; Aly Raisman; Kyla Ross; Jordyn Wieber	Gymnastics	Women's artistic team all-around	July 31
Gold	Vincent Hancock	Shooting	Men's skeet	July 31
Gold	Ricky Berens; Conor Dwyer; Charlie Houchin^{[a]} Ryan Lochte; Matt McLean^{[a]} Michael Phelps; Davis Tarwater^{[a]}	Swimming	Men's 4 × 200 m freestyle relay	July 31
Gold	Allison Schmitt	Swimming	Women's 200 m freestyle	July 31
Gold	Kristin Armstrong	Cycling	Women's time trial	August 1
Gold	Nathan Adrian	Swimming	Men's 100 m freestyle	August 1
Gold	Alyssa Anderson^{[a]} Missy Franklin; Lauren Perdue^{[a]} Allison Schmitt; Dana Vollmer; Shannon Vreeland	Swimming	Women's 4 × 200 m freestyle relay	August 1
Gold	Gabby Douglas	Gymnastics	Women's artistic individual all-around	August 2
Gold	Kayla Harrison	Judo	Women's 78 kg	August 2
Gold	Erin Cafaro; Caryn Davies; Susan Francia; Caroline Lind; Esther Lofgren; Elle Logan; Meghan Musnicki; Taylor Ritzel; Mary Whipple	Rowing	Women's eight	August 2
Gold	Tyler Clary	Swimming	Men's 200 m backstroke	August 2
Gold	Michael Phelps	Swimming	Men's 200 m individual medley	August 2
Gold	Rebecca Soni	Swimming	Women's 200 m breaststroke	August 2
Gold	Michael Phelps	Swimming	Men's 100 m butterfly	August 3
Gold	Katie Ledecky	Swimming	Women's 800 m freestyle	August 3
Gold	Missy Franklin	Swimming	Women's 200 m backstroke	August 3
Gold	Jamie Lynn Gray	Shooting	Women's 50 m rifle 3 positions	August 4
Gold	Nathan Adrian; Matt Grevers; Brendan Hansen; Cullen Jones^{[a]} Tyler McGill^{[a]} Michael Phelps; Eric Shanteau^{[a]} Nick Thoman^{[a]}	Swimming	Men's 4 × 100 m medley relay	August 4
Gold	Rachel Bootsma^{[a]} Claire Donahue^{[a]} Missy Franklin; Jessica Hardy^{[a]} Breeja Larson^{[a]} Allison Schmitt; Rebecca Soni; Dana Vollmer	Swimming	Women's 4 × 100 m medley relay	August 4
Gold	Bob Bryan; Mike Bryan	Tennis	Men's doubles	August 4
Gold	Serena Williams	Tennis	Women's singles	August 4
Gold	Serena Williams; Venus Williams	Tennis	Women's doubles	August 5
Gold	Sanya Richards-Ross	Athletics	Women's 400 m	August 5
Gold	Jenn Suhr	Athletics	Women's pole vault	August 6
Gold	Erik Kynard	Athletics	Men's high jump	August 7
Gold	Aly Raisman	Gymnastics	Women's floor	August 7
Gold	Aries Merritt	Athletics	Men's 110 m hurdles	August 8
Gold	Allyson Felix	Athletics	Women's 200 m	August 8
Gold	Brittney Reese	Athletics	Women's long jump	August 8
Gold	Misty May-Treanor; Kerri Walsh Jennings	Volleyball	Women's beach volleyball	August 8
Gold	Lashinda Demus	Athletics	Women's 400 m hurdles	August 8
Gold	Claressa Shields	Boxing	Women's middleweight	August 9
Gold	United States women's national soccer team: Nicole Barnhart; Shannon Boxx; Rachel Buehler; Lauren Cheney; Tobin Heath; Amy LePeilbet; Sydney Leroux; Carli Lloyd; Heather Mitts; Alex Morgan; Kelley O'Hara; Heather O'Reilly; Christie Rampone; Megan Rapinoe; Amy Rodriguez; Becky Sauerbrunn; Hope Solo; Abby Wambach	Football	Women's tournament	August 9
Gold	Christian Taylor	Athletics	Men's triple jump	August 9
Gold	Ashton Eaton	Athletics	Men's decathlon	August 9
Gold	United States women's national water polo team: Tumua Anae; Elizabeth Armstrong; Kami Craig; Annika Dries; Courtney Mathewson; Heather Petri; Kelly Rulon; Melissa Seidemann; Jessica Steffens; Maggie Steffens; Brenda Villa; Lauren Wenger; Elsie Windes	Water polo	Women's tournament	August 9
Gold	Allyson Felix; Carmelita Jeter; Bianca Knight; Tianna Madison; Jeneba Tarmoh^{[a]} Lauryn Williams^{[a]}	Athletics	Women's 4 × 100 m relay	August 10
Gold	Jordan Burroughs	Wrestling	Men's freestyle 74 kg	August 10
Gold	United States women's national basketball team: Seimone Augustus; Sue Bird; Tamika Catchings; Swin Cash; Tina Charles; Sylvia Fowles; Asjha Jones; Angel McCoughtry; Maya Moore; Candace Parker; Diana Taurasi; Lindsay Whalen	Basketball	Women's tournament	August 11
Gold	David Boudia	Diving	Men's 10 m platform	August 11
Gold	Keshia Baker^{[a]} Diamond Dixon^{[a]} Allyson Felix; Francena McCorory; Sanya Richards-Ross; DeeDee Trotter	Athletics	Women's 4 × 400 m relay	August 11
Gold	United States men's national basketball team: Carmelo Anthony; Kobe Bryant; Tyson Chandler; Anthony Davis; Kevin Durant; James Harden; Andre Iguodala; LeBron James; Kevin Love; Chris Paul; Russell Westbrook; Deron Williams	Basketball	Men's tournament	August 12
Gold	Jake Varner	Wrestling	Men's freestyle 96 kg	August 12
Silver	Brady Ellison; Jake Kaminski; Jacob Wukie	Archery	Men's team	July 28
Silver	Elizabeth Beisel	Swimming	Women's 400 m individual medley	July 28
Silver	Kelci Bryant; Abigail Johnston	Diving	Women's 3 m synchronized springboard	July 29
Silver	Nathan Adrian; Ricky Berens^{[a]} Jimmy Feigen^{[a]} Matt Grevers^{[a]} Cullen Jones; Jason Lezak^{[a]} Ryan Lochte; Michael Phelps	Swimming	Men's 4 × 100 m freestyle relay	July 29
Silver	Allison Schmitt	Swimming	Women's 400 m freestyle	July 29
Silver	Nick Thoman	Swimming	Men's 100 m backstroke	July 30
Silver	Rebecca Soni	Swimming	Women's 100 m breaststroke	July 30
Silver	Michael Phelps	Swimming	Men's 200 m butterfly	July 31
Silver	Ryan Lochte	Swimming	Men's 200 m individual medley	August 2
Silver	Cullen Jones	Swimming	Men's 50 m freestyle	August 3
Silver	Dotsie Bausch; Sarah Hammer; Jennie Reed^{[a]} Lauren Tamayo	Cycling	Women's team pursuit	August 4
Silver	Galen Rupp	Athletics	Men's 10,000 m	August 4
Silver	Carmelita Jeter	Athletics	Women's 100 m	August 4
Silver	McKayla Maroney	Gymnastics	Women's vault	August 5
Silver	Michael Tinsley	Athletics	Men's 400 m hurdles	August 6
Silver	Sarah Hammer	Cycling	Women's omnium	August 7
Silver	Leonel Manzano	Athletics	Men's 1500 m	August 7
Silver	Dawn Harper	Athletics	Women's 100 m hurdles	August 7
Silver	Jason Richardson	Athletics	Men's 110 m hurdles	August 8
Silver	Jennifer Kessy; April Ross	Volleyball	Women's beach volleyball	August 8
Silver	Haley Anderson	Swimming	Women's 10 km open water	August 9
Silver	Will Claye	Athletics	Men's triple jump	August 9
Silver	Trey Hardee	Athletics	Men's decathlon	August 9
Silver	Joshua Mance; Tony McQuay; Manteo Mitchell^{[a]} Bryshon Nellum; Angelo Taylor	Athletics	Men's 4 × 400 m relay	August 10
Silver	Brigetta Barrett	Athletics	Women's high jump	August 11
Silver	United States women's national volleyball team: Foluke Akinradewo; Lindsey Berg; Nicole Davis; Tayyiba Haneef-Park; Christa Harmotto; Megan Hodge; Destinee Hooker; Jordan Larson; Tamari Miyashiro; Danielle Scott-Arruda; Courtney Thompson; Logan Tom	Volleyball	Women's tournament	August 11
Bronze	Peter Vanderkaay	Swimming	Men's 400 m freestyle	July 28
Bronze	Natalie Coughlin^{[a]} Missy Franklin; Jessica Hardy; Lia Neal; Allison Schmitt; Amanda Weir^{[a]}	Swimming	Women's 4 × 100 m freestyle relay	July 28
Bronze	Brendan Hansen	Swimming	Men's 100 m breaststroke	July 29
Bronze	David Boudia; Nicholas McCrory	Diving	Men's 10 m synchronized platform	July 30
Bronze	Marti Malloy	Judo	Women's 57 kg	July 30
Bronze	Caitlin Leverenz	Swimming	Women's 200 m individual medley	July 31
Bronze	Troy Dumais; Kristian Ipsen	Diving	Men's 3 m synchronized springboard	August 1
Bronze	Danell Leyva	Gymnastics	Men's artistic individual all-around	August 1
Bronze	Natalie Dell; Megan Kalmoe; Kara Kohler; Adrienne Martelli	Rowing	Women's quadruple sculls	August 1
Bronze	Ryan Lochte	Swimming	Men's 200 m backstroke	August 2
Bronze	Elizabeth Beisel	Swimming	Women's 200 m backstroke	August 3
Bronze	Reese Hoffa	Athletics	Men's shot put	August 3
Bronze	Courtney Hurley; Kelley Hurley; Maya Lawrence; Susie Scanlan^{[a]}	Fencing	Women's team épée	August 4
Bronze	Charlie Cole; Scott Gault; Glenn Ochal; Henrik Rummel	Rowing	Men's four	August 4
Bronze	Will Claye	Athletics	Men's long jump	August 4
Bronze	Mike Bryan; Lisa Raymond	Tennis	Mixed doubles	August 5
Bronze	Justin Gatlin	Athletics	Men's 100 m	August 5
Bronze	DeeDee Trotter	Athletics	Women's 400 m	August 5
Bronze	Matthew Emmons	Shooting	Men's 50 m rifle 3 positions	August 6
Bronze	Aly Raisman	Gymnastics	Women's balance beam	August 7
Bronze	Kellie Wells	Athletics	Women's 100 m hurdles	August 7
Bronze	Marlen Esparza	Boxing	Women's flyweight	August 8
Bronze	Carmelita Jeter	Athletics	Women's 200 m	August 8
Bronze	Janay DeLoach	Athletics	Women's long jump	August 8
Bronze	Clarissa Chun	Wrestling	Women's freestyle 48 kg	August 8
Bronze	Terrence Jennings	Taekwondo	Men's 68 kg	August 9
Bronze	Shannon Rowbury	Athletics	Women's 1500 m	August 10
Bronze	Paige McPherson	Taekwondo	Women's 67 kg	August 10
Bronze	Georgia Gould	Cycling	Women's cross-country	August 11
Bronze	Coleman Scott	Wrestling	Men's freestyle 60 kg	August 11
Bronze	Tervel Dlagnev	Wrestling	Men's freestyle 120 kg	August 11

Medals by sport
Sport	1st place, gold medalist(s)	2nd place, silver medalist(s)	3rd place, bronze medalist(s)	Total
Swimming	16	9	6	**31**
Athletics	11	10	8	**29**
Gymnastics	3	1	2	**6**
Shooting	3	0	1	**4**
Tennis	3	0	1	**4**
Wrestling	2	0	3	**5**
Basketball	2	0	0	**2**
Cycling	1	2	1	**4**
Volleyball	1	2	0	**3**
Diving	1	1	2	**4**
Rowing	1	0	2	**3**
Boxing	1	0	1	**2**
Judo	1	0	1	**2**
Football	1	0	0	**1**
Water polo	1	0	0	**1**
Archery	0	1	0	**1**
Taekwondo	0	0	2	**2**
Fencing	0	0	1	**1**
Total	48	26	31	105

Medals by day
Day	Date	1st place, gold medalist(s)	2nd place, silver medalist(s)	3rd place, bronze medalist(s)	Total
1	July 28	1	2	2	**5**
2	July 29	2	3	1	**6**
3	July 30	2	2	2	**6**
4	July 31	4	1	1	**6**
5	August 1	3	0	3	**6**
6	August 2	6	1	1	**8**
7	August 3	3	1	2	**6**
8	August 4	5	3	3	**11**
9	August 5	2	1	3	**6**
10	August 6	1	1	1	**3**
11	August 7	2	3	2	**7**
12	August 8	5	2	4	**11**
13	August 9	5	3	1	**9**
14	August 10	2	1	2	**5**
15	August 11	3	2	3	**8**
16	August 12	2	0	0	**2**
Total		48	26	31	105

Medals by gender
Gender	1st place, gold medalist(s)	2nd place, silver medalist(s)	3rd place, bronze medalist(s)	Total	Percentage
Female	30	13	16	**59**	56.2%
Male	18	13	14	**45**	42.9%
Mixed	0	0	1	**1**	0.9%
Total	48	26	31	105	100%

Multiple medalists
Name	Sport	1st place, gold medalist(s)	2nd place, silver medalist(s)	3rd place, bronze medalist(s)	Total
Michael Phelps	Swimming	4	2	0	**6**
Missy Franklin	Swimming	4	0	1	**5**
Allison Schmitt	Swimming	3	1	1	**5**
Ryan Lochte	Swimming	2	2	1	**5**
Allyson Felix	Athletics	3	0	0	**3**
Dana Vollmer	Swimming	3	0	0	**3**
Nathan Adrian	Swimming	2	1	0	**3**
Matt Grevers	Swimming	2	1	0	**3**
Rebecca Soni	Swimming	2	1	0	**3**
Aly Raisman	Gymnastics	2	0	1	**3**
Cullen Jones	Swimming	1	2	0	**3**
Carmelita Jeter	Athletics	1	1	1	**3**
Gabby Douglas	Gymnastics	2	0	0	**2**
Sanya Richards-Ross	Athletics	2	0	0	**2**
Serena Williams	Tennis	2	0	0	**2**
Ricky Berens	Swimming	1	1	0	**2**
Brendan Hansen	Swimming	1	1	0	**2**
McKayla Maroney	Gymnastics	1	1	0	**2**
Nick Thoman	Swimming	1	1	0	**2**
David Boudia	Diving	1	0	1	**2**
Mike Bryan	Tennis	1	0	1	**2**
Jessica Hardy	Swimming	1	0	1	**2**
DeeDee Trotter	Athletics	1	0	1	**2**
Sarah Hammer	Cycling	0	2	0	**2**
Elizabeth Beisel	Swimming	0	1	1	**2**
Will Claye	Athletics	0	1	1	**2**

^{a} Athletes who participated in preliminary rounds but not the final.

== Competitors ==
The USOC selected a team of 530 athletes, 261 men and 269 women, to compete in all sports except handball; it was the nation's sixth-largest team sent to the Olympics, but the smallest since 1988. Athletics was the largest team by sport, with a total of 125 competitors.

The U.S. team featured 302 first-time athletes, and 228 returning Olympians to participate in these games. Among the returning Olympians, seven of them had competed at their fifth Olympics (high jumper Amy Acuff, archer Khatuna Lorig, shooters Kimberly Rhode and Emil Milev, indoor volleyballer Danielle Scott-Arruda, and eventing riders Phillip Dutton and Karen O'Connor – the oldest of the team at age 54). Twenty-one athletes made their fourth Olympic appearances, including springboard diver Troy Dumais, track hurdler Angelo Taylor, and beach volleyballers and double-defending champions Kerri Walsh Jennings and Misty May-Treanor. Fifty-seven athletes made their third Olympic appearances, including rifle shooter Matt Emmons, and twins Bob and Mike Bryan in the men's tennis doubles match. One hundred and forty-three athletes were two-time Olympians, including former defending champions Justin Gatlin (athletics) and Anthony Ervin (swimming), who both made their comeback in London after long years of absence. Two hundred and eight returning athletes had competed in Beijing, including 124 Olympic medalists, and 76 defending champions.

Among the nation's defending champions were swimmers Michael Phelps and Natalie Coughlin. Phelps won a historic amount of eight gold medals in Beijing to become the most-decorated Olympic athlete at a single event and the first person to win a total of fourteen Olympic gold medals. Coughlin, on the other hand, won a total of 11 Olympic medals in two previous games, including six gold medals from Beijing. Other notable defending champions featured basketball players Kobe Bryant and LeBron James, who led their team by recapturing the nation's gold medal in Beijing, shooters Walton Eller and Vincent Hancock, road cyclist Kristin Armstrong in women's time trial, and swimmers Rebecca Soni and Ryan Lochte.

First-time Olympians also featured gymnasts Jordyn Wieber and Aly Raisman, decathlete Ashton Eaton, and swimmers Missy Franklin and Katie Ledecky, the youngest of the team at age 15. Former basketball player and five-time Olympic champion Teresa Edwards served as the U.S. team's chef de mission. Double Olympic champion Mariel Zagunis became the third fencer and sixth female athlete to serve as the United States flag bearer at the opening ceremony.

The following is the list of number of competitors participating in the Games. Note that reserves for fencing, field hockey, football and handball are not counted:

Sport	Men	Women	Total
Archery	3	3	6
Athletics (track and field)	63	62	125
Badminton	2	1	3
Basketball	12	12	24
Boxing	9	3	12
Canoeing	5	2	7
Cycling	12	12	24
Diving	5	6	11
Equestrian	7	6	13
Fencing	8	8	16
Field hockey	0	16	16
Football (football)	0	18	18
Gymnastics	6	7	13
Judo	3	2	5
Modern pentathlon	1	2	3
Rowing	24	20	44
Sailing	9	7	16
Shooting	14	6	20
Swimming	24	25	49
Synchronised swimming	0	2	2
Table tennis	1	3	4
Taekwondo	2	2	4
Tennis	6	6	12
Triathlon	2	3	5
Volleyball	16	16	32
Water polo	13	13	26
Weightlifting	1	2	3
Wrestling	13	4	17
Total	261	269	530

== Archery ==
Three U.S. archers qualified for the men's individual event, three archers for the women's individual event and teams for both the men's team event and women's team event.

Men

Athlete	Event	Ranking round		Round of 64	Round of 32	Round of 16	Quarterfinals	Semifinals	Final / BM	
Athlete	Event	Score	Seed	Opposition Score	Opposition Score	Opposition Score	Opposition Score	Opposition Score	Opposition Score	Rank
Brady Ellison	Individual	676	10	Javier (PHI); W 7–1	Worth (AUS); L 1–7	Did not advance				
Jake Kaminski	Individual	670	18	Olaru (MDA); L 5–6	Did not advance					
Jacob Wukie	Individual	673	12	Talukdar (IND); W 6–0	Nesteng (NOR); L 2–6	Did not advance				
Brady Ellison; Jake Kaminski; Jacob Wukie	Team	2019	4	—N/a		Bye	Japan; W 220–219	South Korea; W 224–219	Italy; L 218–219	2nd place, silver medalist(s)

Women

Athlete	Event	Ranking round		Round of 64	Round of 32	Round of 16	Quarterfinals	Semifinals	Final / BM	
Athlete	Event	Score	Seed	Opposition Score	Opposition Score	Opposition Score	Opposition Score	Opposition Score	Opposition Score	Rank
Miranda Leek	Individual	656	14	Palekha (UKR); W 6–2	Lionetti (ITA); L 4–6	Did not advance				
Khatuna Lorig	Individual	669	4	Zam (BHU); W 6–0	Laursen (DEN); W 6–4	Cheng (CHN); W 7–3	Schuh (FRA); W 6–2	Ki (KOR); L 2–6	Avitia (MEX); L 2–6	4
Jennifer Nichols	Individual	654	15	Swuro (IND); W 6–5	Bishindee (MGL); L 5–6	Did not advance				
Miranda Leek; Khatuna Lorig; Jennifer Nichols	Team	1979	2	—N/a		Bye	China; L 213–218	Did not advance		

== Athletics (track and field) ==
U.S. athletes earned qualifying standards in the following track and field events (up to a maximum of 3 athletes in each event at the 'A' Standard, and 1 at the 'B' Standard): The team was selected based on the results of the 2012 United States Olympic Trials.

Key

- Note–Ranks given for track events are within the athlete's heat only
- Q = Qualified for the next round
- q = Qualified for the next round as a fastest loser or, in field events, by position without achieving the qualifying target
- NR = National record
- N/A = Round not applicable for the event
- Bye = Athlete not required to compete in round

Track & road events
Men

Athlete	Event	Heat		Quarterfinal		Semifinal		Final	
Athlete	Event	Result	Rank	Result	Rank	Result	Rank	Result	Rank
Ryan Bailey	100 m	Bye		9.88	1 Q	9.96	2 Q	9.88	5
Justin Gatlin	100 m	Bye		9.97	1 Q	9.82	1 Q	9.79	3rd place, bronze medalist(s)
~~Tyson Gay~~	100 m	Bye		10.08	1 Q	9.90	2 Q	9.80	DSQ
Maurice Mitchell	200 m	20.54	1 Q	—N/a		20.56	4	Did not advance	
Wallace Spearmon	200 m	20.47	2 Q	—N/a		20.02	2 Q	19.90	4
Isiah Young	200 m	20.55	3 Q	—N/a		20.89	8	Did not advance	
Tony McQuay	400 m	45.45	2 Q	—N/a		45.31	5	Did not advance	
LaShawn Merritt	400 m	DNF		—N/a		Did not advance			
Bryshon Nellum	400 m	45.29	2 Q	—N/a		45.02	3	Did not advance	
Khadevis Robinson	800 m	1:47.17	5	—N/a		Did not advance			
Duane Solomon	800 m	1:46.05	1 Q	—N/a		1:44.93	3 q	1:42.82	4
Nicholas Symmonds	800 m	1:45.91	1 Q	—N/a		1:44.87	3 q	1:42.95	5
Matthew Centrowitz, Jr.	1500 m	3:41.39	5 Q	—N/a		3:34.90	5 Q	3:35.17	4
Leonel Manzano	1500 m	3:37.00	6 Q	—N/a		3:42.94	4 Q	3:34.79	2nd place, silver medalist(s)
Andrew Wheating	1500 m	3:40.92	7 q	—N/a		3:44.88	9	Did not advance	
Bernard Lagat	5000 m	13:15.45	4 Q	—N/a				13:42.99	4
Lopez Lomong	5000 m	13:26.16	4 Q	—N/a				13:48.19	10
Galen Rupp	5000 m	13:17.56	6 q	—N/a				13:45.04	7
Dathan Ritzenhein	10,000 m	—N/a						27:45.89	13
Galen Rupp	10,000 m	—N/a						27:30.90	2nd place, silver medalist(s)
Matt Tegenkamp	10,000 m	—N/a						28:18.26	19
Aries Merritt	110 m hurdles	13.07	1 Q	—N/a		12.94	1 Q	12.92	1st place, gold medalist(s)
Jeffrey Porter	110 m hurdles	13.53	3 Q	—N/a		13.41	5	Did not advance	
Jason Richardson	110 m hurdles	13.33	1 Q	—N/a		13.13	1 Q	13.04	2nd place, silver medalist(s)
Kerron Clement	400 m hurdles	48.48	2 Q	—N/a		48.12	3 q	49.15	8
Angelo Taylor	400 m hurdles	49.29	1 Q	—N/a		47.95	2 Q	48.25	5
Michael Tinsley	400 m hurdles	49.13	1 Q	—N/a		48.18	1 Q	47.91	2nd place, silver medalist(s)
Kyle Alcorn	3000 m steeplechase	8:37.11	9	—N/a				Did not advance	
Donald Cabral	3000 m steeplechase	8:21.46	4 Q	—N/a				8:25.91	8
Evan Jager	3000 m steeplechase	8:16.61	2 Q	—N/a				8:23.87	6
Ryan Bailey; Jeff Demps^{[b]} Justin Gatlin; ~~Tyson Gay~~; Trell Kimmons; Darvis Patton^{[b]}	4 × 100 m relay	37.38 NR	1 Q	—N/a				37.04 NR	DSQ
Joshua Mance; Tony McQuay; Manteo Mitchell^{[b]} Bryshon Nellum; Angelo Taylor	4 × 400 m relay	2:58.87	2 Q	—N/a				2:57.05	2nd place, silver medalist(s)
Abdi Abdirahman	Marathon	—N/a						DNF	
Ryan Hall	Marathon	—N/a						DNF	
Meb Keflezighi	Marathon	—N/a						2:11:06	4
Trevor Barron	20 km walk	—N/a						1:22:46	26
John Nunn	50 km walk	—N/a						4:03:28	43

Women

Athlete	Event	Heat		Quarterfinal		Semifinal		Final	
Athlete	Event	Result	Rank	Result	Rank	Result	Rank	Result	Rank
Allyson Felix	100 m	Bye		11.01	1 Q	10.94	2 Q	10.89	5
Carmelita Jeter	100 m	Bye		10.83	1 Q	10.82	1 Q	10.78	2nd place, silver medalist(s)
Tianna Madison	100 m	Bye		10.97	2 Q	10.92	2 Q	10.85	4
Allyson Felix	200 m	22.71	1 Q	—N/a		22.31	1 Q	21.88	1st place, gold medalist(s)
Carmelita Jeter	200 m	22.65	1 Q	—N/a		22.39	2 Q	22.14	3rd place, bronze medalist(s)
Sanya Richards-Ross	200 m	22.48	1 Q	—N/a		22.30	1 Q	22.39	5
Francena McCorory	400 m	50.78	1 Q	—N/a		50.19	2 Q	50.33	7
Sanya Richards-Ross	400 m	51.78	1 Q	—N/a		50.07	1 Q	49.55	1st place, gold medalist(s)
Dee Dee Trotter	400 m	50.87	1 Q	—N/a		49.87	2 Q	49.72	3rd place, bronze medalist(s)
Geena Gall	800 m	2:03.85	4 q	—N/a		2:05.76	8	Did not advance	
Alysia Montaño	800 m	2:00.47	1 Q	—N/a		1:58.42	4 q	1:57.93	5
Alice Schmidt	800 m	2:01.65	2 Q	—N/a		2:01.63	4	Did not advance	
Shannon Rowbury	1500 m	4:06.03	7 q	—N/a		4:05.47	5 Q	4:11.26	(bronze)
Jennifer Simpson	1500 m	4:13.81	6 Q	—N/a		4:06.89	12	Did not advance	
Morgan Uceny	1500 m	4:06.87	2 Q	—N/a		4:05.34	3 Q	DNF	
Kim Conley	5000 m	15:14.48	12	—N/a				Did not advance	
Julie Culley	5000 m	15:05.38	5 Q	—N/a				15:28.22	14
Molly Huddle	5000 m	15:02.26	5 Q	—N/a				15:20.29	11
Janet Cherobon-Bawcom	10,000 m	—N/a						31:12.68	12
Amy Hastings	10,000 m	—N/a						31:10.69	11
Lisa Uhl	10,000 m	—N/a						31:12.80	13
Dawn Harper	100 m hurdles	12.75	2 Q	—N/a		12.46	1 Q	12.37	2nd place, silver medalist(s)
Lolo Jones	100 m hurdles	12.68	1 Q	—N/a		12.71	3 q	12.58	4
Kellie Wells	100 m hurdles	12.69	1 Q	—N/a		12.51	1 Q	12.48	3rd place, bronze medalist(s)
Ti'erra Brown	400 m hurdles	54.72	2 Q	—N/a		54.21	3 q	55.07	6
Lashinda Demus	400 m hurdles	54.60	1 Q	—N/a		54.08	1 Q	52.77	1st place, gold medalist(s)
Georganne Moline	400 m hurdles	54.31	1 Q	—N/a		54.74	2 Q	53.92	5
Emma Coburn	3000 m steeplechase	9:27.51	3 Q	—N/a				9:23.54	9
Bridget Franek	3000 m steeplechase	9:29.86	5 q	—N/a				9:45.51	14
Shalaya Kipp	3000 m steeplechase	9:48.33	12	—N/a				Did not advance	
Allyson Felix; Carmelita Jeter; Bianca Knight; Tianna Madison; Jeneba Tarmoh^{[b]} Lauryn Williams^{[b]}	4 × 100 m relay	41.64	1 Q	—N/a				40.82 WR	1st place, gold medalist(s)
Keshia Baker^{[b]} Diamond Dixon^{[b]} Allyson Felix; Francena McCorory; Sanya Richards-Ross; DeeDee Trotter	4 × 400 m relay	3:22.09	1 Q	—N/a				3:16.88	1st place, gold medalist(s)
Desiree Davila	Marathon	—N/a						DNF	
Shalane Flanagan	Marathon	—N/a						2:25:51	10
Kara Goucher	Marathon	—N/a						2:26:07	11
Maria Michta	20 km walk	—N/a						1:32:27	29

^{b} Athletes that participated in heats only.

Field events
Men

Athlete	Event	Qualification		Final	
Athlete	Event	Distance	Position	Distance	Position
Will Claye	Long jump	7.99	8 Q	8.12	3rd place, bronze medalist(s)
Marquise Goodwin	Long jump	8.11	2 Q	7.80	10
George Kitchens	Long jump	6.84	39	Did not advance	
Will Claye	Triple jump	16.87	7 q	17.63	2nd place, silver medalist(s)
Christian Taylor	Triple jump	17.21	1 Q	17.81	1st place, gold medalist(s)
Erik Kynard	High jump	2.29	3 q	2.33	1st place, gold medalist(s)
Jamie Nieto	High jump	2.26	7 q	2.29	6
Jesse Williams	High jump	2.29	3 q	2.25	9
Derek Miles	Pole vault	NM	—	Did not advance	
Jeremy Scott	Pole vault	5.50	15	Did not advance	
Brad Walker	Pole vault	5.60	4 q	NM	—
Christian Cantwell	Shot put	20.41	9 Q	21.19	4
Reese Hoffa	Shot put	21.36	1 Q	21.23	3rd place, bronze medalist(s)
Ryan Whiting	Shot put	20.78	4 Q	20.64	9
Lance Brooks	Discus throw	61.17	21	Did not advance	
Jarred Rome	Discus throw	59.57	31	Did not advance	
Jason Young	Discus throw	62.18	18	Did not advance	
Sean Furey	Javelin throw	72.81	37	Did not advance	
Cyrus Hostetler	Javelin throw	75.76	32	Did not advance	
Craig Kinsley	Javelin throw	78.18	23	Did not advance	
Kibwe Johnson	Hammer throw	77.17	5 q	74.95	9
AG Kruger	Hammer throw	72.13	25	Did not advance	

Women

Athlete	Event	Qualification		Final	
Athlete	Event	Distance	Position	Distance	Position
Janay DeLoach	Long jump	6.81	2 Q	6.89	3rd place, bronze medalist(s)
Chelsea Hayes	Long jump	6.37	16	Did not advance	
Brittney Reese	Long jump	6.57	9 q	7.12	1st place, gold medalist(s)
Amanda Smock	Triple jump	13.61	27	Did not advance	
Amy Acuff	High jump	1.85	=20	Did not advance	
Brigetta Barrett	High jump	1.93	6 q	2.03	2nd place, silver medalist(s)
Chaunte Lowe	High jump	1.93	2 q	1.97	6
Becky Holliday	Pole vault	4.55	10 q	4.45	9
Lacey Janson	Pole vault	4.40	15	Did not advance	
Jennifer Suhr	Pole vault	4.55	1 q	4.75	1st place, gold medalist(s)
Tia Brooks	Shot put	17.72	19	Did not advance	
Jillian Camarena-Williams	Shot put	18.22	15	Did not advance	
Michelle Carter	Shot put	18.63	8 q	19.42	5
Gia Lewis-Smallwood	Discus throw	61.44	15	Did not advance	
Aretha Thurmond	Discus throw	59.39	25	Did not advance	
Stephanie Brown Trafton	Discus throw	64.89	5 Q	63.01	8
Brittany Borman	Javelin throw	59.27	15	Did not advance	
Kara Patterson	Javelin throw	56.23	31	Did not advance	
Rachel Yurkovich	Javelin throw	57.92	24	Did not advance	
Amanda Bingson	Hammer throw	67.29	28	Did not advance	
Amber Campbell	Hammer throw	69.93	13	Did not advance	
Jessica Cosby	Hammer throw	69.65	14	Did not advance	

Combined events – Men's decathlon

Athlete	Event	100 m	LJ	SP	HJ	400 m	110H	DT	PV	JT	1500 m	Final	Rank
Ashton Eaton	Result	10.35	8.03	14.66	2.05	46.90	13.56	42.53	5.20	61.96	4:33.59	8869	1st place, gold medalist(s)
Ashton Eaton	Points	1011	1068	769	850	963	1032	716	972	767	721	8869	1st place, gold medalist(s)
Trey Hardee	Result	10.42	7.53	15.28	1.99	48.11	13.54	48.26	4.80	66.65	4:40.94	8671	2nd place, silver medalist(s)
Trey Hardee	Points	994	942	807	794	904	1035	834	849	838	674	8671	2nd place, silver medalist(s)

Combined events – Women's heptathlon

Athlete	Event	100H	HJ	SP	200 m	LJ	JT	800 m	Final	Rank
Sharon Day	Result	13.57	1.77	14.28	24.36	5.85	43.90	2:11.31	6232	14
Sharon Day	Points	1040	941	813	946	804	742	946	6232	14
Hyleas Fountain	Result	12.70	1.86	11.99	23.64	6.05	21.60	DNS	DNF	
Hyleas Fountain	Points	1170	1054	660	1016	865	319	DNS	DNF	
Chantae McMillan	Result	13.49	1.68	14.92	25.25	5.37	49.78	2:40.55	5688	27
Chantae McMillan	Points	1052	830	856	864	663	856	567	5688	27

== Badminton ==
The United States will be represented in two out of the five badminton events: men's doubles and women's singles. No US athlete has ever medaled in badminton since it became an Olympic sport in 1992.

Athlete	Event	Group stage				Elimination	Quarterfinal	Semifinal	Final / BM	
Athlete	Event	Opposition Score	Opposition Score	Opposition Score	Rank	Opposition Score	Opposition Score	Opposition Score	Opposition Score	Rank
Howard Bach; Tony Gunawan	Men's doubles	Jung / Lee (KOR); L 14–21, 19–21	Koo / Tan (MAS); L 12–21, 14–21	Kawamae / Sato (JPN); L 15–21, 15–21	4	—N/a	Did not advance			
Rena Wang	Women's singles	Wang X (CHN); L 8–21, 6–21	—N/a		2	Did not advance				

== Basketball ==
Summary

Team	Event	Group stage						Quarterfinal	Semifinal	Final / BM	
Team	Event	Opposition Score	Opposition Score	Opposition Score	Opposition Score	Opposition Score	Rank	Opposition Score	Opposition Score	Opposition Score	Rank
United States men	Men's tournament	France; W 98–71	Tunisia; W 110–63	Nigeria; W 156–73	Lithuania; W 99–94	Argentina; W 126–97	1 Q	Australia; W 119–86	Argentina; W 109–83	Spain; W 107–100	1st place, gold medalist(s)
United States women	Women's tournament	Croatia; W 81–56	Angola; W 90–38	Turkey; W 89–58	Czech Republic; W 88–61	China; W 114–66	1 Q	Canada; W 91–48	Australia; W 86–73	France; W 86–50	1st place, gold medalist(s)

=== Men's tournament ===
Roster
The following is the United States roster in the men's basketball tournament of the 2012 Summer Olympics.

United States men's national basketball team – 2012 Summer Olympics roster
Players
Coaches

Pos.	No.	Name	Age – Date of birth	Height	Club
C	4	Tyson Chandler	29 – October 2, 1982	7 ft 1 in (2.16 m)	New York Knicks
F	5	Kevin Durant	23 – September 29, 1988	6 ft 10 in (2.08 m)	Oklahoma City Thunder
F	6	LeBron James	27 – December 30, 1984	6 ft 8 in (2.03 m)	Miami Heat
G	7	Russell Westbrook	23 – November 12, 1988	6 ft 3 in (1.91 m)	Oklahoma City Thunder
G	8	Deron Williams	28 – June 26, 1984	6 ft 3 in (1.91 m)	Brooklyn Nets
F	9	Andre Iguodala	28 – January 28, 1984	6 ft 6 in (1.98 m)	Philadelphia 76ers
G	10	Kobe Bryant	33 – August 23, 1978	6 ft 6 in (1.98 m)	Los Angeles Lakers
F	11	Kevin Love	23 – September 7, 1988	6 ft 9 in (2.06 m)	Minnesota Timberwolves
G	12	James Harden	22 – August 26, 1989	6 ft 5 in (1.96 m)	Oklahoma City Thunder
G	13	Chris Paul	27 – May 6, 1985	6 ft 0 in (1.83 m)	Los Angeles Clippers
C	14	Anthony Davis	19 – March 11, 1993	6 ft 10 in (2.08 m)	Kentucky Wildcats
F	15	Carmelo Anthony	28 – May 29, 1984	6 ft 7 in (2.01 m)	New York Knicks

Head coach

- Mike Krzyzewski

Assistant coach(es)

- Jim Boeheim
- Mike D'Antoni
- Nate McMillan
- Jerry Colangelo (executive director)

Legend

- Club – describes last
  club before the tournament
- Age – describes age
  on 29 July 2012

Group play

Pos	Team	Pld	W	L	PF	PA	PD	Pts	Qualification
1	United States	5	5	0	589	398	+191	10	Quarterfinals
2	France	5	4	1	376	378	−2	9	Quarterfinals
3	Argentina	5	3	2	448	424	+24	8	Quarterfinals
4	Lithuania	5	2	3	395	399	−4	7	Quarterfinals
5	Nigeria	5	1	4	338	456	−118	6	
6	Tunisia	5	0	5	320	411	−91	5	

Source: FIBA archive
Rules for classification: 1) points; 2) head-to-head points; 3) head-to-head goal average; 4) head-to-head number of points scored.

29 July 2012
14:30

Report

United States	98–71	France
Scoring by quarter: 22–21, 30–15, 26–15, 20–20
Pts: Durant 22; Rebs: three players 9 Asts: James 8		Pts: Traoré 12; Rebs: Turiaf 9 Asts: de Colo 3

Basketball Arena, London
Referees: Cristiano Maranho (BRA), Saša Pukl (SLO), Michael Aylen (AUS)

31 July 2012
22:15

Report

Tunisia	63–110	United States
Scoring by quarter: 15–21, 18–25, 14–39, 16–25
Pts: Ben Romdhane 22; Rebs: Ben Romdhane 11; Asts: Ben Romdhane 4		Pts: Love, Anthony 16; Rebs: Durant 10; Asts: Paul 7

Basketball Arena, London
Referees: Vaughan Mayberry (AUS), Samir Abaakil (MAR), Oļegs Latiševs (LAT)

2 August 2012
22:15

Report

United States	156–73	Nigeria
Scoring by quarter: 49–25, 29–20, 41–17, 37–11
Pts: Anthony 37; Rebs: Davis, Love 6 Asts: Williams 11		Pts: Diogu 27; Rebs: Diogu 7 Asts: Aminu 4

Basketball Arena, London
Referees: Juan Arteaga (ESP), Robert Lottermoser (GER), Elena Chernova (RUS)

4 August 2012
14:30

Report

Lithuania	94–99	United States
Scoring by quarter: 25–33, 26–22, 21–23, 22–21
Pts: Kleiza 25; Rebs: Pocius 7 Asts: Jasikevičius, Pocius 6		Pts: James, Anthony 20; Rebs: Love 8 Asts: Paul 6

Basketball Arena, London
Referees: Recep Ankaralı (TUR), Luigi Lamonica (ITA), Marcos Benito (BRA)

6 August 2012
22:15

Report

Argentina	97–126	United States
Scoring by quarter: 32–34, 27–26, 17–42, 21–24
Pts: Ginóbili 16; Rebs: Ginóbili 5 Asts: Campazzo 7		Pts: Durant 28; Rebs: Iguodala, Love 9 Asts: Paul 7

Basketball Arena, London
Referees: Christos Christodoulou (GRE), Ilija Belošević (SRB), Stephen Seibel (CAN)

Quarterfinal

8 August 2012
22:15

Report

United States	119–86	Australia
Scoring by quarter: 28–21, 28–21, 28–28, 35–16
Pts: Bryant 20; Rebs: James 14; Asts: James 11		Pts: Mills 26; Rebs: Ingles 8 Asts: Ingles 6

North Greenwich Arena, London
Referees: Luigi Lamonica (ITA), Fernando Sampietro (ARG), Samir Abaakil (MAR)

Semifinal

10 August 2012
21:00

Report

Argentina	83–109	United States
Scoring by quarter: 19–24, 21–23, 17–27, 26–35
Pts: Ginobili 18; Rebs: Delfino 5 Asts: Prigioni 6		Pts: Durant 19; Rebs: Love 9 Asts: James, Paul 7

North Greenwich Arena, London
Referees: Carl Jungebrand (FIN), Recep Ankaralı (TUR), Robert Lottermoser (GER)

Gold medal game

12 August 2012
15:00

Report 1
Report 2

(gold) United States	107–100	Spain (silver)
Scoring by quarter: 35–27, 24–31, 24–24, 24–18
Pts: Durant 30; Rebs: Durant, Love 9 Asts: James 4		Pts: P. Gasol 24; Rebs: Ibaka 9 Asts: P. Gasol 7

North Greenwich Arena, London
Referees: Cristiano Maranho (BRA), Christos Christodoulou (GRE), Michael Aylen (AUS)

=== Women's tournament ===
Roster
The following is the United States roster in the women's basketball tournament of the 2012 Summer Olympics.

United States women's national basketball team – 2012 Summer Olympics roster
Players
Coaches

Pos.	No.	Name	Age – Date of birth	Height	Club	Ctr.
G	4	Lindsay Whalen	30 – May 9, 1982	5 ft 9 in (1.75 m)	Minnesota Lynx	(United States)
F	5	Seimone Augustus	28 – April 30, 1984	6 ft 0 in (1.83 m)	Minnesota Lynx	(United States)
G	6	Sue Bird	31 – October 16, 1980	5 ft 9 in (1.75 m)	Seattle Storm	(United States)
F	7	Maya Moore	23 – June 11, 1989	6 ft 0 in (1.83 m)	Minnesota Lynx	(United States)
F	8	Angel McCoughtry	25 – September 10, 1986	6 ft 1 in (1.85 m)	Atlanta Dream	(United States)
F	9	Asjha Jones	31 – August 1, 1980	6 ft 3 in (1.91 m)	Connecticut Sun	(United States)
F	10	Tamika Catchings	33 – July 21, 1979	6 ft 1 in (1.85 m)	Indiana Fever	(United States)
F	11	Swin Cash	32 – September 22, 1979	6 ft 1 in (1.85 m)	Chicago Sky	(United States)
G/F	12	Diana Taurasi	30 – June 11, 1982	6 ft 0 in (1.83 m)	Phoenix Mercury	(United States)
C	13	Sylvia Fowles	27 – June 10, 1985	6 ft 6 in (1.98 m)	Chicago Sky	(United States)
C	14	Tina Charles	23 – December 5, 1988	6 ft 4 in (1.93 m)	Connecticut Sun	(United States)
F/C	15	Candace Parker	26 – April 19, 1986	6 ft 4 in (1.93 m)	Los Angeles Sparks	(United States)

Head coach

- (United States) Geno Auriemma

Assistant coach(es)

- (United States) Doug Bruno
- (United States) Jennifer Gillom
- (United States) Marynell Meadors

Legend

- Club – describes last
  club before the tournament
- Age – describes age
  on 28 July 2012

Group play

Pos	Team	Pld	W	L	PF	PA	PD	Pts	Qualification
1	United States	5	5	0	462	279	+183	10	Quarterfinals
2	Turkey	5	4	1	343	316	+27	9	Quarterfinals
3	China	5	3	2	346	363	−17	8	Quarterfinals
4	Czech Republic	5	2	3	346	332	+14	7	Quarterfinals
5	Croatia	5	1	4	324	379	−55	6	
6	Angola	5	0	5	243	395	−152	5	

Source: FIBA archive
Rules for classification: 1) points; 2) head-to-head points; 3) head-to-head goal average; 4) head-to-head number of points scored.

28 July 2012
16:45

Report

United States	81–56	Croatia
Scoring by quarter: 11–4, 20–24, 22–19, 28–9
Pts: Charles 14; Rebs: Parker 13; Asts: Bird 5		Pts: Ivezić 22; Rebs: Ivanković 7 Asts: Lelas 5

Basketball Arena, London
Referees: Juan Arteaga (ESP), Oļegs Latiševs (LAT), Snehal Bendke (IND)

30 July 2012
22:15

Report

Angola	38–90	United States
Scoring by quarter: 12–22, 6–19, 11–28, 9–21
Pts: Guadalupe 11; Rebs: Mauricio, Manuel 6 Asts: Manuel 2		Pts: Parker 14; Rebs: Parker 12; Asts: Bird 5

Basketball Arena, London
Referees: Carole Delauné (FRA), Marcos Benito (BRA), Robert Lottermoser (GER)

1 August 2012
22:15

Report

United States	89–58	Turkey
Scoring by quarter: 19–16, 22–10, 22–21, 26–11
Pts: McCoughtry 18; Rebs: three players 7 Asts: Bird 4		Pts: Vardarlı, Hollingsworth 11; Rebs: Hollingsworth 8 Asts: Vardarlı, Alben 3

Basketball Arena, London
Referees: Michael Aylen (AUS), Stephen Seibel (CAN), Peng Ling (CHN)

3 August 2012
22:15

Report

Czech Republic	61–88	United States
Scoring by quarter: 26–24, 12–24, 9–22, 14–18
Pts: Zrůstová 15; Rebs: Pecková 6 Asts: Bartoňová 3		Pts: Taurasi 18; Rebs: Charles 14; Asts: Bird 9

Basketball Arena, London
Referees: Elena Chernova (RUS), Marcos Benito (BRA), Vitalis Gode (KEN)

5 August 2012
16:45

Report

China	66–114	United States
Scoring by quarter: 28–31, 8–30, 12–33, 18–20
Pts: Song Xiaoyun 15; Rebs: four players 3 Asts: Miao Lijie 8		Pts: Taurasi 22; Rebs: Moore 7 Asts: Catchings 7

Basketball Arena, London
Referees: Guerrino Cerebuch (ITA), Borys Ryschyk (UKR), Carole Delauné (FRA)

Quarterfinal

7 August 2012
14:00

Report

United States	91–48	Canada
Scoring by quarter: 19–8, 23–13, 26–10, 23–17
Pts: Taurasi 15; Rebs: Moore, Parker 7 Asts: Bird 5		Pts: Smith 13; Rebs: Phillips 8 Asts: Phillips 5

Basketball Arena, London
Referees: Guerrino Cerebuch (ITA), Shoko Sugruro (JPN), Vitalis Gode (KEN)

Semifinal

9 August 2012
17:00

Report

Australia	73–86	United States
Scoring by quarter: 22–20, 25–23, 12–22, 14–21
Pts: Cambage 19; Rebs: Jackson 17; Asts: Jarry 5		Pts: Taurasi, Charles 14; Rebs: Charles 10; Asts: Charles 4

North Greenwich Arena, London
Referees: Ilija Belošević (SRB), Borys Ryschyk (UKR), Snehal Bendke (IND)

Gold medal game

11 August 2012
21:00

Report

(gold) United States	86–50	France (silver)
Scoring by quarter: 20–15, 17–10, 26–12, 23–13
Pts: Parker 21; Rebs: Parker 11; Asts: Taurasi 6		Pts: Gruda, Lawson-Wade 12; Rebs: Ndongue 8 Asts: Dumerc 3

North Greenwich Arena, London
Referees: Fernando Sampietro (ARG), Elena Chernova (RUS), Peng Ling (CHN)

== Boxing ==
U.S. boxers qualified for the following events:

Men

Athlete	Event	Round of 32	Round of 16	Quarterfinals	Semifinals	Final	
Athlete	Event	Opposition Result	Opposition Result	Opposition Result	Opposition Result	Opposition Result	Rank
Rau'shee Warren	Flyweight	Bye	Oubaali (FRA); L 18–19	Did not advance			
Joseph Diaz	Bantamweight	Ishchenko (UKR); W 19–9	Álvarez (CUB); L 15–21	Did not advance			
José Ramírez	Lightweight	Azzedine (FRA); W 21–20	Gaibnazarov (UZB); L 11–15	Did not advance			
Jamel Herring	Light welterweight	Yeleussinov (KAZ); L 9–19	Did not advance				
Errol Spence Jr.	Welterweight	Carvalho (BRA); W 16–10	Krishan (IND); W^{[c]} 15–13	Zamkovoy (RUS); L 11–16	Did not advance		
Terrell Gausha	Middleweight	Hakobyan (ARM); W RSC 3 (13–12)	Singh (IND); L 14–15	Did not advance			
Marcus Browne	Light heavyweight	Hooper (AUS); L 11–13	Did not advance				
Michael Hunter	Heavyweight	—N/a	Beterbiyev (RUS); L 10–10	Did not advance			
Dominic Breazeale	Super heavyweight	—N/a	Omarov (RUS); L 8–19	Did not advance			

^{c} - Spence successfully appealed his initial 11–13 loss. Using video review, AIBA determined the bout referee gave too few cautions for holding fouls and should have awarded Spence at least four more points.

Women

Athlete	Event	Round of 16	Quarterfinals	Semifinals	Final	
Athlete	Event	Opposition Result	Opposition Result	Opposition Result	Opposition Result	Rank
Marlen Esparza	Flyweight	Bye	Magliocco (VEN); W 24–16	Ren (CHN); L 8–10	Did not advance	3rd place, bronze medalist(s)
Quanitta Underwood	Lightweight	Jonas (GBR); L 13–21	Did not advance			
Claressa Shields	Middleweight	Bye	Laurell (SWE); W 18–14	Volnova (KAZ); W 29–15	Torlopova (RUS); W 19–12	1st place, gold medalist(s)

== Canoeing ==
=== Slalom ===
U.S. canoeists qualified boats for the following events

Athlete	Event	Preliminary						Semifinal		Final	
Athlete	Event	Run 1	Rank	Run 2	Rank	Best	Rank	Time	Rank	Time	Rank
Casey Eichfeld	Men's C-1	97.04	10	102.02	12	97.04	14	Did not advance			
Eric Hurd; Jeff Larimer	Men's C-2	112.91	12	109.78	9	109.78	12	Did not advance			
Scott Parsons	Men's K-1	94.16	13	141.72	19	94.16	16	Did not advance			
Caroline Queen	Women's K-1	117.05	13	186.23	19	117.05	17	Did not advance			

=== Sprint ===
U.S. canoeists qualified boats in three out of twelve sprint events, one men's and one women's. No U.S. athlete has medaled in Olympic sprint canoeing since 1992.

Athlete	Event	Heats		Semifinals		Final	
Athlete	Event	Time	Rank	Time	Rank	Time	Rank
Tim Hornsby	Men's K-1 200 m	36.560	6 q	37.660	8 FB	39.370	15
Carrie Johnson	Women's K-1 200 m	43.355	6 Q	43.321	8	Did not advance	
Carrie Johnson	Women's K-1 500 m	1:53.983	4 Q	1:54.628	6	Did not advance	

== Cycling ==
U.S. cyclists qualified for the following events

=== Road ===
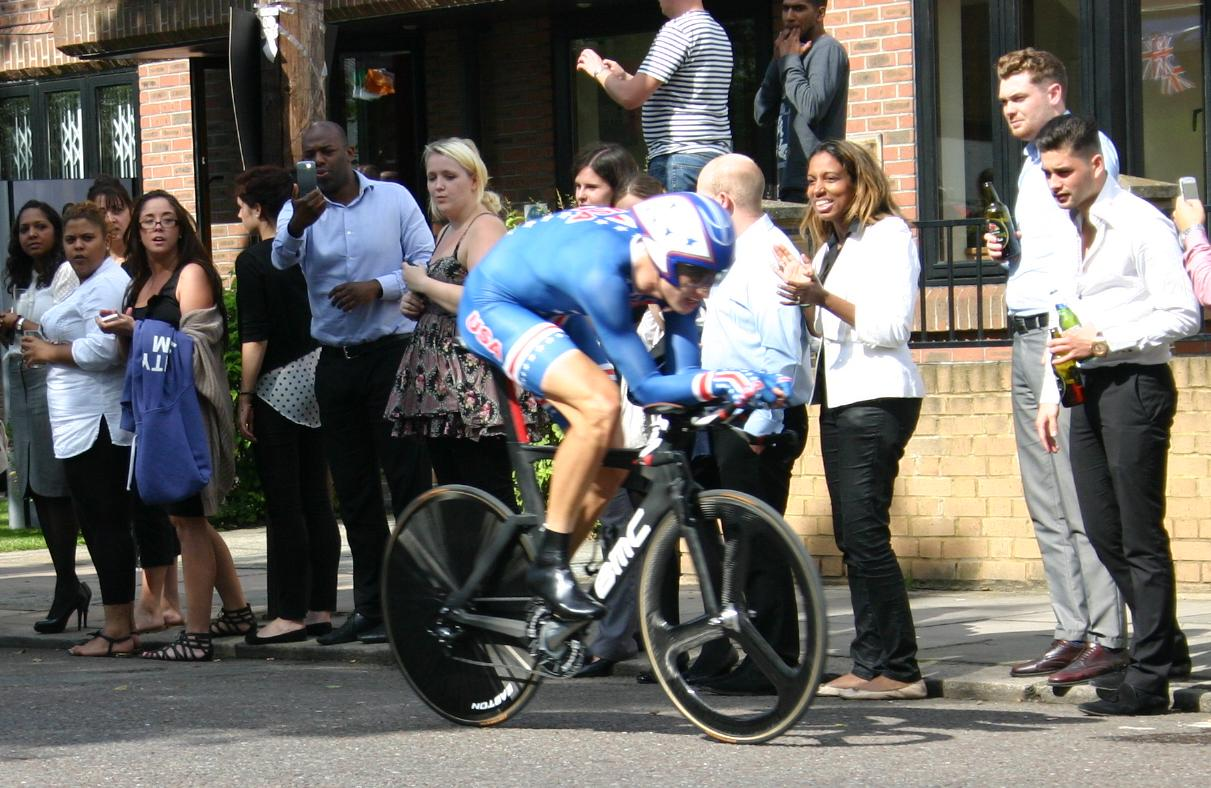
Taylor Phinney in the time trials

Men

Athlete	Event	Time	Rank
Timmy Duggan	Road race	5:46:37	88
Tyler Farrar	Road race	5:46:37	33
Chris Horner	Road race	5:46:46	93
Taylor Phinney	Road race	5:46:05	4
Tejay van Garderen	Road race	5:47:31	104
Taylor Phinney	Time trial	52:38.07	4

Women

Athlete	Event	Time	Rank
Kristin Armstrong	Road race	3:36:16	35
Amber Neben	Road race	3:36:20	36
Shelley Olds	Road race	3:35:56	7
Evelyn Stevens	Road race	3:35:56	24
Kristin Armstrong	Time trial	37:34.82	1st place, gold medalist(s)
Amber Neben	Time trial	38:45.17	7

=== Track ===
Sprint

Athlete	Event	Qualification		Round 1	Repechage 1	Round 2	Repechage 2	Quarterfinals	Semifinals	Final	
Athlete	Event	Time Speed (km/h)	Rank	Opposition Time Speed (km/h)	Opposition Time Speed (km/h)	Opposition Time Speed (km/h)	Opposition Time Speed (km/h)	Opposition Time Speed (km/h)	Opposition Time Speed (km/h)	Opposition Time Speed (km/h)	Rank
Jimmy Watkins	Men's sprint	10.247; 70.264	12	Nakagawa (JPN); W 10.339; 69.237	Bye	Kelemen (CZE); W 10.511; 68.499	Bye	Perkins (AUS); L, L	Did not advance	5th place final Awang (MAS); Forstemann (GER); Dmitriev (RUS); L	6

Pursuit

Athlete	Event	Qualification		Semifinals		Final	
Athlete	Event	Time	Rank	Opponent Time	Rank	Opponent Time	Rank
Dotsie Bausch; Sarah Hammer; Jennie Reed^{[d]} Lauren Tamayo	Women's team pursuit	3:19.406	2 Q	Australia; 3:16.853 NR	2	Great Britain; 3:19.727	2nd place, silver medalist(s)

^{d} Cyclist who participated in a preliminary round but not the final.

Omnium

Athlete	Event	Flying lap		Points race		Elimination race	Individual pursuit		Scratch race	Time trial		Total points	Rank
Athlete	Event	Time	Rank	Points	Rank	Rank	Time	Rank	Rank	Time	Rank	Total points	Rank
Bobby Lea	Men's omnium	13.559	10	8	12	8	4:30.127	11	7	1:04.853	13	61	12
Sarah Hammer	Women's omnium	14.369	5	25	5	2	3:29.554	1	2	35.900	4	19	2nd place, silver medalist(s)

=== Mountain biking ===
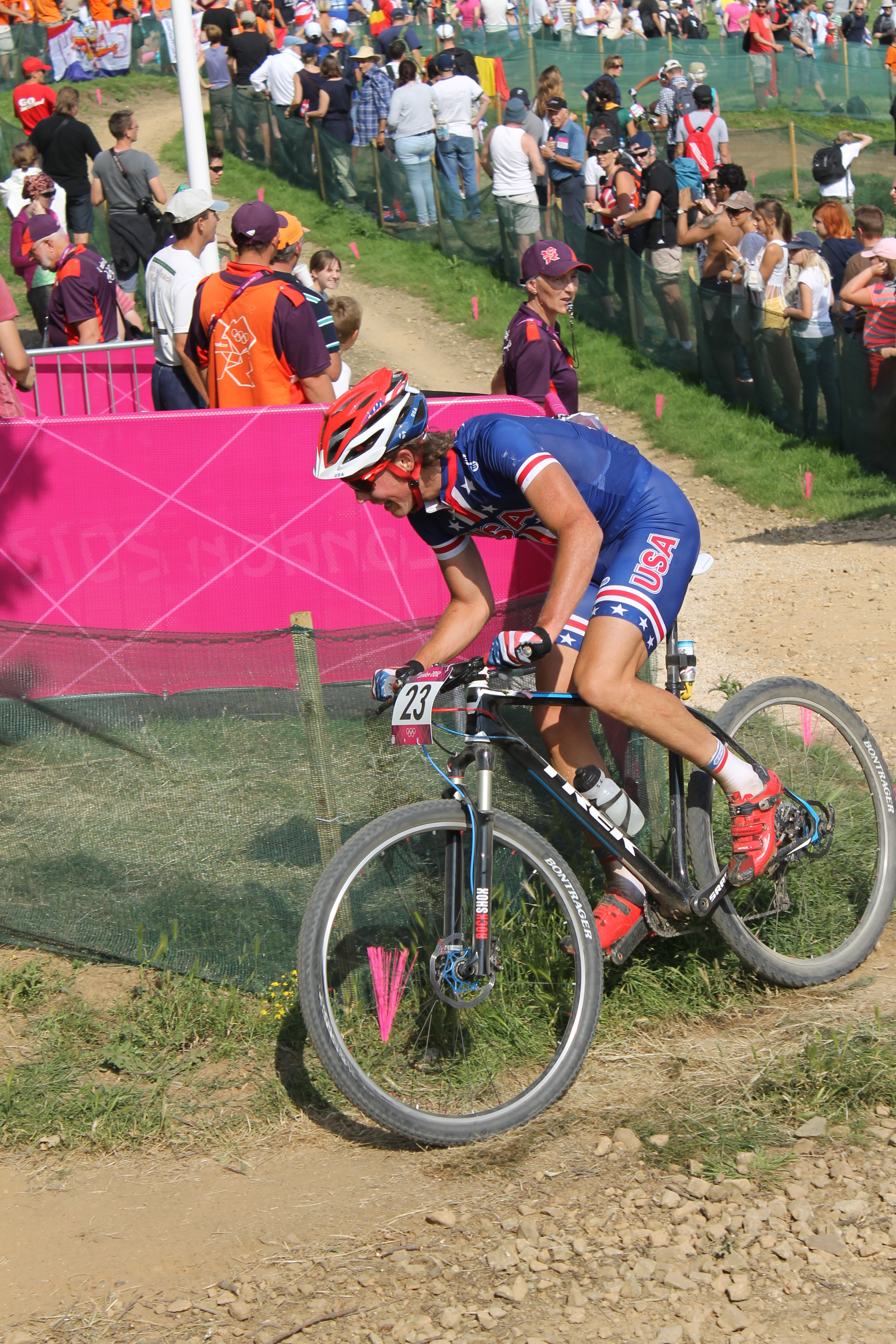
Samuel Schultz in men's cross-country race

Athlete	Event	Time	Rank
Samuel Schultz	Men's cross-country	1:32:29	15
Todd Wells	Men's cross-country	1:31:28	10
Lea Davison	Women's cross-country	1:35:14	11
Georgia Gould	Women's cross-country	1:32:00	3rd place, bronze medalist(s)

=== BMX ===
Athlete	Event	Seeding		Quarterfinal		Semifinal		Final	
Athlete	Event	Time	Rank	Points	Rank	Points	Rank	Time	Rank
Connor Fields	Men's BMX	38.431	4	3	1 Q	6	1 Q	1:03.033	7
David Herman	Men's BMX	38.955	15	16	4 q	15	6	Did not advance	
Nic Long	Men's BMX	38.601	7	18	5	Did not advance			
Brooke Crain	Women's BMX	DNF	16	—N/a		14	3 Q	40.286	8
Alise Post	Women's BMX	39.890	8	—N/a		18	6	Did not advance	

== Diving ==
U.S. divers qualified for eight individual diving spots at the 2012 Olympic Games. Three US synchronized diving teams qualified through the 2012 FINA Diving World Cup and the rest of the divers qualified for the Olympics through the 2012 U.S. Olympic Trials for diving (quotas themselves were won at the world championships while divers who filled them were selected after the trials)

Men

Athlete	Event	Preliminaries		Semifinals		Final	
Athlete	Event	Points	Rank	Points	Rank	Points	Rank
Chris Colwill	3 m springboard	461.35	7 Q	339.80	18	Did not advance	
Troy Dumais	3 m springboard	486.60	3 Q	490.55	5 Q	498.35	5
David Boudia	10 m platform	439.15	18 Q	531.15	3 Q	568.65	1st place, gold medalist(s)
Nick McCrory	10 m platform	480.90	8 Q	506.50	7 Q	505.40	9
Troy Dumais; Kristian Ipsen	3 m synchronized springboard	—N/a				446.70	3rd place, bronze medalist(s)
David Boudia; Nick McCrory	10 m synchronized platform	—N/a				463.47	3rd place, bronze medalist(s)

Women

Athlete	Event	Preliminaries		Semifinals		Final	
Athlete	Event	Points	Rank	Points	Rank	Points	Rank
Cassidy Krug	3 m springboard	320.10	10 Q	345.60	5 Q	342.85	7
Christina Loukas	3 m springboard	330.45	7 Q	339.75	6 Q	332.10	8
Katherine Bell	10 m platform	326.95	9 Q	296.80	16	Did not advance	
Brittany Viola	10 m platform	322.55	14 Q	300.50	15	Did not advance	
Kelci Bryant; Abigail Johnston	3 m synchronized springboard	—N/a				321.90	2nd place, silver medalist(s)

== Equestrian ==
U.S. equestrians qualified teams in the dressage and eventing team competitions. and also qualified a team in the jumping team competition.

They have also qualified four athletes in the individual dressage competition, five athletes in the individual eventing competition, and four athletes in the individual jumping competition.

Dressage

Athlete	Horse	Event	Grand Prix		Grand Prix Special		Grand Prix Freestyle		Overall	
Athlete	Horse	Event	Score	Rank	Score	Rank	Technical	Artistic	Score	Rank
Jan Ebeling	Rafalca	Individual	70.243	30 Q	69.302	28	Did not advance			
Tina Konyot	Calecto V	Individual	70.456	27 Q	70.651	25	Did not advance			
Adrienne Lyle	Wizard	Individual	69.468	35	Did not advance					
Steffen Peters	Ravel	Individual	77.705	6 Q	76.254	=7 Q	74.143	80.429	77.286	17
Jan Ebeling; Tina Konyot; Steffen Peters	See above	Team	72.801	5 Q	72.069	7	—N/a		72.435	6

Eventing

Athlete	Horse	Event	Dressage		Cross-country			Jumping						Total	
Athlete	Horse	Event	Dressage		Cross-country			Qualifier			Final			Total	
Athlete	Horse	Event	Penalties	Rank	Penalties	Total	Rank	Penalties	Total	Rank	Penalties	Total	Rank	Penalties	Rank
Will Coleman	Twizzel	Individual	46.30	26	36.40	82.70	46	2.00	84.70	37	Did not advance			84.70	37
Tiana Coudray	Ringwood Magister	Individual	52.00	42	25.60	77.60	42	11.00	88.60	40	Did not advance			88.60	40
Phillip Dutton	Mystery Whisper	Individual	44.30	19	2.80	47.10	12	23.00	70.10	27 Q	11.00	81.10	23	81.10	23
Boyd Martin	Otis Barbotiere	Individual	50.70	=36	3.60	54.30	26	Withdrew							
Karen O'Connor	Mr. Medicott	Individual	48.20	29	5.60	53.80	=24	0.00	53.80	16 Q	0.00	53.80	9	53.80	9
Will Coleman; Tiana Coudray; Phillip Dutton; Boyd Martin; Karen O'Connor	See above	Team	138.80	7	16.40	155.20	5	53.40	208.60	7	—N/a			208.60	7

Jumping

Athlete	Horse	Event	Qualification								Final					Total	
Athlete	Horse	Event	Round 1		Round 2			Round 3			Round A		Round B			Total	
Athlete	Horse	Event	Penalties	Rank	Penalties	Total	Rank	Penalties	Total	Rank	Penalties	Rank	Penalties	Total	Rank	Penalties	Rank
Rich Fellers	Flexible	Individual	0	=1 Q	0	0	=1 Q	8	8	=11 Q	5	=20 Q	0	5	8	5	8
Reed Kessler	Cylana	Individual	1	=33 Q	9	10	=47	Did not advance									
Beezie Madden	Via Volo	Individual	42	=72	Did not advance												
McLain Ward	Antares F	Individual	0	=1 Q	4	4	=17 Q	8	12	=26 Q	12	=29	Did not advance			12	=29
Rich Fellers; Reed Kessler; Beezie Madden; McLain Ward	See above	Team	—N/a								8	=7 Q	20	28	=6	28	=6

== Fencing ==
Twenty U.S. fencers have qualified to compete in all fencing events.

Men

Athlete	Event	Round of 64	Round of 32	Round of 16	Quarterfinal	Semifinal	Final / BM	
Athlete	Event	Opposition Score	Opposition Score	Opposition Score	Opposition Score	Opposition Score	Opposition Score	Rank
Weston Kelsey	Individual épée	—N/a	Li (CHN); W 8–7	Novosjolov (EST); W 15–11	Fernández (VEN); W 15–9	Limardo (VEN); L 5–6	Jung (KOR); L 11–12	4
Soren Thompson	Individual épée	—N/a	Fiedler (GER); L 4–15	Did not advance				
Miles Chamley-Watson	Individual foil	Bye	Abouelkassem (EGY); L 10–15	Did not advance				
Race Imboden	Individual foil	Bye	Toldo (BRA); W 15–5	Baldini (ITA); L 9–15	Did not advance			
Alexander Massialas	Individual foil	Bye	Lalonde-Turbide (CAN); W 15–6	Cheremisinov (RUS); L 6–15	Did not advance			
Miles Chamley-Watson; Race Imboden; Alexander Massialas; Gerek Meinhardt	Team foil	—N/a		Bye	France; W 45–39	Italy; L 24–45	Germany; L 27–45	4
Daryl Homer	Individual sabre	Bye	Dolniceanu (ROU); W 15–11	Yakimenko (RUS); W 15–14	Dumitrescu (ROU); L 13–15	Did not advance		
Tim Morehouse	Individual sabre	Bye	Reshetnikov (RUS); W 15–6	Lapkes (BLR); W 15–13	Occhiuzzi (ITA); L 9–15	Did not advance		
James Williams	Individual sabre	Bye	Kovalev (RUS); L 12–15	Did not advance				
Daryl Homer; Tim Morehouse; Jeff Spear; James Williams	Team sabre	—N/a			Russia; L 33–45	Classification semi-final China; L 28–45	7th place final Belarus; L 35–45	8

Women

Athlete	Event	Round of 64	Round of 32	Round of 16	Quarterfinal	Semifinal	Final / BM	
Athlete	Event	Opposition Score	Opposition Score	Opposition Score	Opposition Score	Opposition Score	Opposition Score	Rank
Courtney Hurley	Individual épée	Bye	Flessel-Colovic (FRA); L 12–15	Did not advance				
Maya Lawrence	Individual épée	Bye	Navarria (ITA); W 15–12	Fiamingo (ITA); L 7–15	Did not advance			
Susie Scanlan	Individual épée	Kryvytska (UKR); L 13–15	Did not advance					
Courtney Hurley; Kelley Hurley; Maya Lawrence; Susie Scanlan^{[e]}	Team épée	—N/a			Italy; W 45–35	South Korea; L 36–45	Russia; W 31–30	3rd place, bronze medalist(s)
Lee Kiefer	Individual foil	Bye	Peterson (CAN); W 15–10	Jung (KOR); W 15–13	Errigo (ITA); L 10–15	Did not advance		
Nzingha Prescod	Individual foil	Bye	Mohamed (HUN); L 10–15	Did not advance				
Nicole Ross	Individual foil	Bye	Boubakri (TUN); L 8–15	Did not advance				
Lee Kiefer; Nzingha Prescod; Nicole Ross; Doris Willette	Team foil	—N/a		Bye	South Korea; L 31–45	Classification semi-final Japan; W 44–22	5th place final Poland; L 39–45	6
Dagmara Wozniak	Individual sabre	—N/a	Mahran (EGY); W 15–6	Besbes (TUN); W 15–13	Velikaya (RUS); L 13–15	Did not advance		
Mariel Zagunis	Individual sabre	—N/a	Permatasari (INA); W 15–7	Nakayama (JPN); W 15–9	Zhu (CHN); W 15–6	Kim (KOR); L 13–15	Kharlan (UKR); L 10–15	4

^{e} Fencer that participated in a preliminary round but not the final

== Field hockey ==
The U.S. women's field hockey team qualified for the Olympics by winning the 2011 Pan American Games. The men's team failed to qualify.

Summary

Team	Event	Group stage						Quarterfinal	Semifinal	Final / BM / Pl.	
Team	Event	Opposition Score	Opposition Score	Opposition Score	Opposition Score	Opposition Score	Rank	Opposition Score	Opposition Score	Opposition Score	Rank
United States women	Women's tournament	Germany; L 1–2	Argentina; W 1–0	Australia; L 1–0	New Zealand; L 2–3	South Africa; L 0–7	6	Did not advance		11th place match Belgium; L 1–2	12

=== Women's tournament ===
Roster The following is the American roster in the women's field hockey tournament of the 2012 Summer Olympics.

Head Coach: Lee Bodimeade

5. Melissa González
8. Rachel Dawson
9. Michelle Vittese
11. Shannon Taylor
12. Julia Reinprecht
13. Keli Smith Puzo
14. Katie Reinprecht
16. Katie O'Donnell
18. Michelle Kasold
19. Caroline Nichols
20. Paige Selenski
21. Claire Laubach
23. Katelyn Falgowski
25. Amy Swensen (GK)
26. Kayla Bashore Smedley
27. Lauren Crandall

Reserves:

- Michelle Cesan
- Jaclyn Kintzer (GK)

Group play

Pos	Team	Pld	W	D	L	GF	GA	GD	Pts	Qualification
1	Argentina	5	3	1	1	12	4	+8	10	Semi-finals
2	New Zealand	5	3	1	1	9	5	+4	10	Semi-finals
3	Australia	5	3	1	1	5	2	+3	10	
4	Germany	5	2	1	2	6	7	−1	7	
5	South Africa	5	1	0	4	9	14	−5	3	
6	United States	5	1	0	4	4	13	−9	3	

Source: FIH
Rules for classification: 1) Points; 2) Matches won; 3) Goal difference; 4) Goals for; 5) Head-to-head result.

29 July 2012
21:15

Germany	2–1	United States
Rinne 8'; Hahn 21'	Report	Crandall 56'

Umpires:
Carol Metchette (IRL)
Wendy Stewart (CAN)

31 July 2012
19:00

Argentina	0–1	United States
	Report	Taylor 28'

Umpires:
Claire Adenot (FRA)
Julie Ashton-Lucy (AUS)

2 August 2012
10:45

Australia	1–0	United States
Flanagan 33'	Report

Umpires:
Stella Bartlema (NED)
Soledad Iparraguirre (ARG)

4 August 2012
19:00

United States	2–3	New Zealand
O'Donnell 16'; Laubach 34'	Report	Sharland 3'; Flynn 19'; Eshuis 64'

Umpires:
Carolina de la Fuente (ARG)
Kang Hyun-young (KOR)

6 August 2012
10:45

United States	0–7	South Africa
	Report	Bright 14', 44'; George 20'; Wilson 25'; Coetzee 33', 62'; Chamberlain 54'

Umpires:
Frances Block (GBR)
Claire Adenot (FRA)

11th place match

10 August 2012
08:30

Belgium	2–1	United States
Gerniers 20'; Valcke 52'	Report	Selenski 6'

Umpires:
Elena Eskina (RUS)
Irene Presenqui (ARG)

== Football (soccer) ==
The U.S. women's soccer team qualified after finishing in first place at the 2012 CONCACAF Women's Olympic Qualifying Tournament. The men's team failed to qualify.

Summary

Team	Event	Group stage				Quarterfinal	Semifinal	Final / BM	
Team	Event	Opposition Score	Opposition Score	Opposition Score	Rank	Opposition Score	Opposition Score	Opposition Score	Rank
United States women	Women's tournament	France; W 4–2	Colombia; W 3–0	North Korea; W 1–0	1 Q	New Zealand; W 2–0	Canada; W 4–3 a.e.t	Japan; W 2–1	1st place, gold medalist(s)

=== Women's tournament ===
Team roster
Head coach: (Sweden) Pia Sundhage

The United States named a squad of 18 players and 4 alternates for the tournament.

No.	Pos.	Player	Date of birth (age)	Caps	Goals	Club
1	GK	Hope Solo	30 July 1981 (aged 30)	118	0	(United States Soccer Federation) Seattle Sounders
2	DF	Heather Mitts	9 June 1978 (aged 34)	126	2	Unattached
3	DF	Christie Rampone (captain)	24 June 1975 (aged 37)	260	4	Unattached
4	DF	Becky Sauerbrunn	6 June 1985 (aged 27)	24	0	(United States Soccer Federation) D.C. United
5	DF	Kelley O'Hara	4 August 1988 (aged 23)	19	0	Unattached
6	DF	Amy LePeilbet	12 March 1982 (aged 30)	70	0	Unattached
7	MF	Shannon Boxx	29 June 1977 (aged 35)	168	23	Unattached
8	FW	Amy Rodriguez	17 February 1987 (aged 25)	89	25	Unattached
9	MF	Heather O'Reilly	2 January 1985 (aged 27)	166	34	(United States Soccer Federation) Boston Breakers
10	MF	Carli Lloyd	16 July 1982 (aged 30)	135	36	Unattached
11	FW	Sydney Leroux	7 May 1990 (aged 22)	14	7	(United States Soccer Federation) Seattle Sounders
12	FW	Lauren Cheney	30 September 1987 (aged 24)	67	18	Unattached
13	FW	Alex Morgan	2 July 1989 (aged 23)	42	27	(United States Soccer Federation) Seattle Sounders
14	FW	Abby Wambach	2 June 1980 (aged 32)	182	138	Unattached
15	MF	Megan Rapinoe	5 July 1985 (aged 27)	52	12	(United States Soccer Federation) Seattle Sounders
16	DF	Rachel Buehler	26 August 1985 (aged 26)	82	3	Unattached
17	MF	Tobin Heath	29 May 1988 (aged 24)	45	6	(United States Soccer Federation) New York Fury
18	GK	Nicole Barnhart	10 October 1981 (aged 30)	43	0	Unattached

Group play

Pos	Team	Pld	W	D	L	GF	GA	GD	Pts	Qualification
1	United States	3	3	0	0	8	2	+6	9	Qualified for the quarter-finals
2	France	3	2	0	1	8	4	+4	6	Qualified for the quarter-finals
3	North Korea	3	1	0	2	2	6	−4	3	
4	Colombia	3	0	0	3	0	6	−6	0	

Source: IOC
25 July 2012
17:00

United States	4–2	France
Wambach 19'; Morgan 32', 66'; Lloyd 56'	Report	Thiney 12'; Delie 14'

Hampden Park, Glasgow
Attendance: 18,090
Referee: Sachiko Yamagishi (Japan)

28 July 2012
17:00

United States	3–0	Colombia
Rapinoe 33'; Wambach 74'; Lloyd 77'	Report

Hampden Park, Glasgow
Attendance: 11,313
Referee: Efthalia Mitsi (Greece)

31 July 2012
17:15

United States	1–0	North Korea
Wambach 25'	Report

Old Trafford, Manchester
Attendance: 29,522
Referee: Jenny Palmqvist (Sweden)

Quarterfinal

3 August 2012
14:30

United States	2–0	New Zealand
Wambach 27'; Leroux 87'	Report

St James' Park, Newcastle
Attendance: 10,441
Referee: Salomé di Iorio (Argentina)

Semifinal

6 August 2012
19:45

Canada	3–4 (a.e.t.)	United States
Sinclair 22', 67', 73'	Report	Rapinoe 54', 70'; Wambach 80' (pen.); Morgan 120+3'

Old Trafford, Manchester
Attendance: 26,630
Referee: Christina Pedersen (Norway)

Gold medal match

9 August 2012
19:45

(gold) United States	2–1	Japan (silver)
Lloyd 8', 54'	Report	Ōgimi 63'

Wembley Stadium, London
Attendance: 80,203
Referee: Bibiana Steinhaus (Germany)

== Gymnastics ==
=== Artistic ===
Men
Team

Athlete	Event	Qualification								Final							
Athlete	Event	Apparatus						Total	Rank	Apparatus						Total	Rank
Athlete	Event	F	PH	R	V	PB	HB	Total	Rank	F	PH	R	V	PB	HB	Total	Rank
Jake Dalton	Team	15.633 Q	—N/a	15.100	15.900	—N/a				15.466	—N/a	15.033	16.066	—N/a		—N/a	
Jonathan Horton	Team	—N/a	12.700	15.166	—N/a	13.133	15.566 Q	—N/a		—N/a		15.266	—N/a		15.200	—N/a	
Danell Leyva	Team	15.100	14.866	14.600	15.500	15.333	15.866 Q	91.265	1 Q	15.200	13.400	—N/a		15.366	15.866	—N/a	
Sam Mikulak	Team	15.366	14.333	—N/a	16.300 Q	15.316	14.033	—N/a		14.600	14.500	—N/a	15.966	15.266	—N/a	—N/a	
John Orozco	Team	15.166	14.766	15.066	15.800	14.533	15.266	90.597	4 Q	—N/a	12.733	14.958	14.600	15.133	15.333	—N/a	
Total	Team	46.165	43.965	45.332	48.000	45.182	46.698	275.342	1 Q	45.266	40.633	45.257	46.632	45.765	46.399	269.952	5

Individual finals

Athlete	Event	Apparatus						Total	Rank
Athlete	Event	F	PH	R	V	PB	HB	Total	Rank
Danell Leyva	All-around	15.366	13.500	14.733	15.566	15.833	15.700	90.698	3rd place, bronze medalist(s)
John Orozco	All-around	15.433	12.566	15.200	15.900	15.266	14.966	89.331	8
Jake Dalton	Floor	15.333	—N/a					15.333	5
Sam Mikulak	Vault	—N/a			16.050	—N/a		16.050	5
Jonathan Horton	Horizontal bar	—N/a					15.466	15.466	6
Danell Leyva	Horizontal bar	—N/a					15.833	15.833	5

Women

The women were selected after competing at the Olympic Trials in San Jose, California earlier in the summer.
Team

Athlete	Event	Qualification						Final					
Athlete	Event	Apparatus				Total	Rank	Apparatus				Total	Rank
Athlete	Event	F	V	UB	BB	Total	Rank	F	V	UB	BB	Total	Rank
Gabby Douglas	Team	13.766	15.900	15.333 Q	15.266 Q	60.265	3 Q	15.066	15.966	15.200	15.233	—N/a	
McKayla Maroney	Team	—N/a	15.900 Q	—N/a				—N/a	16.233	—N/a		—N/a	
Aly Raisman	Team	15.325 Q	15.800	14.166	15.100 Q	60.391	2 Q	15.300	—N/a		14.933	—N/a	
Kyla Ross	Team	13.733	—N/a	14.866	15.075	—N/a		—N/a		14.933	15.133	—N/a	
Jordyn Wieber	Team	14.666 Q	15.833	14.833	14.700	60.032	4	15.000	15.933	14.666	—N/a	—N/a	
Total	Team	43.757	47.633	45.032	45.441	181.863	1 Q	45.366	48.132	44.799	45.299	183.596	1st place, gold medalist(s)

Individual finals

Athlete	Event	Apparatus				Total	Rank
Athlete	Event	F	V	UB	BB	Total	Rank
Gabby Douglas	All-around	15.033	15.966	15.733	15.500	62.232	1st place, gold medalist(s)
Aly Raisman	All-around	15.133	15.900	14.333	14.200	59.566	4 (Note: Aliya Mustafina of Russia and Aly Raisman finished with the same total score of 59.566. In the case of a tie, the sum of the three highest apparatus scores is used. These sums were 45.933 for Mustafina and 45.366 for Raisman (both dropping their Beam score), earning Mustafina the bronze medal.)
Aly Raisman	Floor	15.600	—N/a			15.600	1st place, gold medalist(s)
Jordyn Wieber	Floor	14.500	—N/a			14.500	7
McKayla Maroney	Vault	—N/a	15.083	—N/a		15.083	2nd place, silver medalist(s)
Gabby Douglas	Uneven bars	—N/a		14.900	—N/a	14.900	8
Gabby Douglas	Balance beam	—N/a			13.633	13.633	7
Aly Raisman	Balance beam	—N/a			15.066	15.066	3rd place, bronze medalist(s)

=== Rhythmic ===
One U.S. rhythmic gymnast qualified for the individual all-around competition.

Athlete	Event	Qualification						Final					
Athlete	Event	Hoop	Ball	Clubs	Ribbon	Total	Rank	Hoop	Ball	Clubs	Ribbon	Total	Rank
Julie Zetlin	Individual	23.750	24.450	24.225	24.250	96.675	21	Did not advance					

=== Trampoline ===
One male and one female gymnast qualified for the trampoline competition.

Athlete	Event	Qualification		Final	
Athlete	Event	Score	Rank	Score	Rank
Steven Gluckstein	Men's	61.020	16	Did not advance	
Savannah Vinsant	Women's	101.355	7 Q	54.965	6

== Judo ==
Three male and two female U.S. judoka qualified.

Nicholas Delpopolo was ejected from the Games and disqualified by the International Olympic Committee from his seventh position finish after he tested positive for marijuana. Though he claimed he had accidentally taken the banned substance before the Games begun, he apologized for the "embarrassment".

Athlete	Event	Round of 64	Round of 32	Round of 16	Quarterfinals	Semifinals	Repechage	Final / BM	
Athlete	Event	Opposition Result	Opposition Result	Opposition Result	Opposition Result	Opposition Result	Opposition Result	Opposition Result	Rank
Nick Delpopolo	Men's −73 kg	Bye	Cheung (HKG); W 0020–0000	van Tichelt (BEL); W 0001–0000	Wang (KOR); L 0000–0000	Did not advance	Sainjargal (MGL); L 0002–0011	Did not advance	~~7~~; DSQ
Travis Stevens	Men's −81 kg	Bye	Sedej (SLO); W 0101–0002	Tchrikishvili (GEO); W 1001–0001	Guilheiro (BRA); W 0101–0000	Bischof (GER); L 0000–0000	Bye	Valois-Fortier (CAN); L 0000–0011	5
Kyle Vashkulat	Men's −100 kg	—N/a	Sayidov (UZB); L 0000–1000	Did not advance					
Marti Malloy	Women's −57 kg	—N/a	Monteiro (POR); W 0001–0000	Amaris (COL); W 0100–0000	Zabludina (RUS); W 0012–0011	Căprioriu (ROU); L 0001–1001	Bye	Quintavalle (ITA); W 0100–0001	3rd place, bronze medalist(s)
Kayla Harrison	Women's −78 kg	—N/a	Bye	Moskalyuk (RUS); W 0100–0000	Joo (HUN); W 0101–0010	Aguiar (BRA); W 0101–0000	Bye	Gibbons (GBR); W 0002–0000	1st place, gold medalist(s)

== Modern pentathlon ==
Three U.S. athletes qualified to compete in the modern pentathlon event. Dennis Bowsher and Margaux Isaksen qualified through the 2011 Pan American Games.

Athlete	Event	Fencing (épée one touch)			Swimming (200 m freestyle)			Riding (show jumping)			Combined: shooting/running (10 m air pistol)/(3000 m)			Total points	Final rank
Athlete	Event	Results	Rank	MP points	Time	Rank	MP points	Penalties	Rank	MP points	Time	Rank	MP points	Total points	Final rank
Dennis Bowsher	Men's	12–23	=34	688	2:05.15	18	1300	124	29	1076	11:25.09	30	2260	5324	32
Margaux Isaksen	Women's	22–13	=4	928	2:18.53	16	1140	80	23	1120	11:54.51	4	2144	5332	4
Suzanne Stettinius	Women's	11–24	=32	664	2:22.29	27	1096	80	20	1120	12:42.84	25	1952	4832	28

== Rowing ==
The U.S. rowers qualified the following boats:

Men

Athlete	Event	Heats		Repechage		Quarterfinals		Semifinals		Final	
Athlete	Event	Time	Rank	Time	Rank	Time	Rank	Time	Rank	Time	Rank
Ken Jurkowski	Single sculls	7:08.39	3 QF	Bye		7:18.27	5 SC/D	7:56.51	6 FD	DNS	24
Tom Peszek; Silas Stafford	Pair	6:26.59	4 R	6:27.41	3 SA/B	—N/a		6:58.58	4 FB	6:53.30	8
Charlie Cole; Scott Gault; Glenn Ochal; Henrik Rummel	Four	5:54.88	1 SA/B	Bye		—N/a		6:01.72	1 FA	6:07.20	3rd place, bronze medalist(s)
Peter Graves; Elliot Hovey; Alex Osborne; Wes Piermarini	Quadruple sculls	5:50.24	4 R	5:45.62	4	—N/a		Did not advance			13
Anthony Fahden; Nick LaCava; Will Newell; Robin Prendes	Lightweight four	6:02.42	5 R	6:00.86	1 SA/B	—N/a		6:05.06	5 FB	6:09.23	8
David Banks; Jake Cornelius; Grant James; Ross James; Stephen Kasprzyk; Giuseppe Lanzone; Will Miller; Brett Newlin; Zach Vlahos (cox)	Eight	5:30.72	1 FA	Bye		—N/a				5:51.48	4

Women

Athlete	Event	Heats		Repechage		Quarterfinals		Semifinals		Final	
Athlete	Event	Time	Rank	Time	Rank	Time	Rank	Time	Rank	Time	Rank
Genevra Stone	Single sculls	7:33.68	3 QF	Bye		7:39.67	2 SA/B	7:52.98	4 FB	7:45.24	7
Sara Hendershot; Sarah Zelenka	Pair	6:59.29	2 FA	Bye		—N/a				7:30.39	4
Margot Shumway; Sarah Trowbridge	Double sculls	6:55.25	3 R	7:10.37	2 FA	—N/a				7:10.54	6
Kristin Hedstrom; Julie Nichols	Lightweight double sculls	7:08.43	3 R	7:13.82	1 SA/B	—N/a		7:12.61	4 FB	7:23.31	11
Natalie Dell; Megan Kalmoe; Kara Kohler; Adrienne Martelli	Quadruple sculls	6:15.76	2 R	6:19.49	2 FA	—N/a				6:40.63	3rd place, bronze medalist(s)
Erin Cafaro; Caryn Davies; Susan Francia; Caroline Lind; Esther Lofgren; Elle Logan; Meghan Musnicki; Taylor Ritzel; Mary Whipple	Eight	6:14.68	1 FA	Bye		—N/a				6:10.59	1st place, gold medalist(s)

Qualification Legend: FA=Final A (medal); FB=Final B (non-medal); FC=Final C (non-medal); FD=Final D (non-medal); FE=Final E (non-medal); FF=Final F (non-medal); SA/B=Semifinals A/B; SC/D=Semifinals C/D; SE/F=Semifinals E/F; QF=Quarterfinals; R=Repechage

== Sailing ==
U.S. sailors qualified one boat for each of the following events.

Men

Athlete	Event	Race											Net points	Final rank
Athlete	Event	1	2	3	4	5	6	7	8	9	10	M*	Net points	Final rank
Bob Willis	RS:X	7	10	11	25	~~39~~; ~~BFD~~	28	24	33	11	30	EL	179	22
Rob Crane	Laser	35	42	30	28	16	26	19	8	33	~~44~~	EL	236	29
Zach Railey	Finn	10	15	13	17	2	8	12	8	12	~~19~~	EL	116	12
Graham Biehl; Stuart McNay	470	17	22	10	3	23	~~24~~	6	18	9	4	EL	108	14
Brian Fatih; Mark Mendelblatt	Star	5	~~14~~	5	3	8	9	5	10	3	11	6	71	7

Women
Fleet racing

Athlete	Event	Race											Net points	Final rank
Athlete	Event	1	2	3	4	5	6	7	8	9	10	M*	Net points	Final rank
Farrah Hall	RS:X	22	18	18	18	20	22	23	~~27~~; ~~OCS~~	16	16	EL	173	20
Paige Railey	Laser Radial	8	5	12	17	4	9	~~21~~	20	9	8	6	104	8
Amanda Clark; Sarah Lihan	470	7	3	7	7	19	~~20~~	3	9	17	9	10	98	9

Match racing

Athlete	Event	Round Robin												Quarterfinal	Semifinal	Final	
Athlete	Event	Opposition Result	Opposition Result	Opposition Result	Opposition Result	Opposition Result	Opposition Result	Opposition Result	Opposition Result	Opposition Result	Opposition Result	Opposition Result	Rank	Opposition Result	Opposition Result	Opposition Result	Rank
Debbie Capozzi; Anna Tunnicliffe; Molly Vandemoer	Elliott 6m	FRA; W	RUS; L	AUS; L	SWE; W	NED; W	NZL; W	POR; W	FIN; W	ESP; L	DEN; W	GBR; W	4 Q	FIN; L (1–3)	Did not advance^{[f]}		5

^{f} Classification races for 5th through 8th place were cancelled due to lack of wind and round robin standings were used to determine ranks.

Open

Athlete	Event	Race																Net points	Final rank
Athlete	Event	1	2	3	4	5	6	7	8	9	10	11	12	13	14	15	M*	Net points	Final rank
Trevor Moore; Erik Storck	49er	6	10	16	1	7	13	~~20~~	18	2	17	5	20	17	8	17	EL	157	15

== Shooting ==
Twenty U.S. athletes qualified to compete in thirteen shooting events.

Men

Athlete	Event	Qualification		Final	
Athlete	Event	Points	Rank	Points	Rank
Matt Emmons	10 m air rifle	590	35	Did not advance	
Jonathan Hall	10 m air rifle	592	27	Did not advance	
Michael McPhail	50 m rifle prone	595	9	Did not advance	
Eric Uptagrafft	50 m rifle prone	594	16	Did not advance	
Matt Emmons	50 m rifle 3 positions	1172	2 Q	1271.3	3rd place, bronze medalist(s)
Jason Parker	50 m rifle 3 positions	1159	30	Did not advance	
Daryl Szarenski	10 m air pistol	575	23	Did not advance	
Jason Turner	10 m air pistol	569	34	Did not advance	
Emil Milev	25 m rapid fire pistol	578	13	Did not advance	
Keith Sanderson	25 m rapid fire pistol	578	14	Did not advance	
Nick Mowrer	50 m pistol	558	15	Did not advance	
Daryl Szarenski	50 m pistol	550	28	Did not advance	
Walton Eller	Double trap	126	22	Did not advance	
Josh Richmond	Double trap	131	16	Did not advance	
Vincent Hancock	Skeet	123 OR	1 Q	148 OR	1st place, gold medalist(s)
Frank Thompson	Skeet	119	8	Did not advance	

Women

Athlete	Event	Qualification		Final	
Athlete	Event	Points	Rank	Points	Rank
Jamie Lynn Gray	10 m air rifle	397	6 Q	499.7	5
Sarah Scherer	10 m air rifle	397	7 Q	499.0	7
Amanda Furrer	50 m rifle 3 positions	581	15	Did not advance	
Jamie Lynn Gray	50 m rifle 3 positions	592 OR	1 Q	691.9 OR	1st place, gold medalist(s)
Sandra Uptagrafft	10 m air pistol	378	28	Did not advance	
Sandra Uptagrafft	25 m pistol	576	28	Did not advance	
Corey Cogdell	Trap	68	11	Did not advance	
Kimberly Rhode	Trap	68	9	Did not advance	
Kimberly Rhode	Skeet	74 OR	1 Q	99	1st place, gold medalist(s)

== Swimming ==
U.S. swimmers earned qualifying standards in the following events (up to a maximum of 2 swimmers in each event at the Olympic Qualifying Time (OQT), and 1 at the Olympic Selection Time (OST)): Swimmers qualified at the 2012 U.S. Olympic Trials (for pool events).

The U.S. swimming team consisted of 49 swimmers (24 men and 25 women). The oldest swimmer on the team was Jason Lezak at the age of 36 years, and the youngest was Katie Ledecky at the age of 15 years. The only siblings on the swim team are Haley Anderson and Alyssa Anderson. USA Swimming named Brendan Hansen, Natalie Coughlin, Peter Vanderkaay, Rebecca Soni, and Lezak as the team's captains.

Men

Athlete	Event	Heat		Semifinal		Final	
Athlete	Event	Time	Rank	Time	Rank	Time	Rank
Anthony Ervin	50 m freestyle	21.83	4 Q	21.62	3 Q	21.78	5
Cullen Jones	50 m freestyle	21.95	6 Q	21.54	=1 Q	21.54	2nd place, silver medalist(s)
Nathan Adrian	100 m freestyle	48.19	1 Q	47.97	1 Q	47.52	1st place, gold medalist(s)
Cullen Jones	100 m freestyle	48.61	9 Q	48.60	14	Did not advance	
Ricky Berens	200 m freestyle	1:47.07	8 Q	1:46.87	9	Did not advance	
Ryan Lochte	200 m freestyle	1:46.45	2 Q	1:46.31	5 Q	1:45.04	4
Conor Dwyer	400 m freestyle	3:46.24	3 Q	—N/a		3:46.39	5
Peter Vanderkaay	400 m freestyle	3:45.80	2 Q	—N/a		3:44.69	3rd place, bronze medalist(s)
Andrew Gemmell	1500 m freestyle	14:59.05	9	—N/a		Did not advance	
Connor Jaeger	1500 m freestyle	14:57.56	7 Q	—N/a		14:52.99	6
Matt Grevers	100 m backstroke	52.92	1 Q	52.66	1 Q	52.16 OR	1st place, gold medalist(s)
Nick Thoman	100 m backstroke	53.48	3 Q	53.47	5 Q	52.92	2nd place, silver medalist(s)
Tyler Clary	200 m backstroke	1:56.24	1 Q	1:54.71	1 Q	1:53.41 OR	1st place, gold medalist(s)
Ryan Lochte	200 m backstroke	1:56.36	2 Q	1:55.40	2 Q	1:53.94	3rd place, bronze medalist(s)
Brendan Hansen	100 m breaststroke	59.93	10 Q	59.78	8 Q	59.49	3rd place, bronze medalist(s)
Eric Shanteau	100 m breaststroke	59.96	11 Q	59.96	11	Did not advance	
Clark Burckle	200 m breaststroke	2:09.55	6 Q	2:09.13	6 Q	2:09.25	6
Scott Weltz	200 m breaststroke	2:09.67	7 Q	2:08.99	4 Q	2:09.02	5
Tyler McGill	100 m butterfly	51.95	7 Q	51.61	3 Q	51.88	7
Michael Phelps	100 m butterfly	51.72	2 Q	50.86	1 Q	51.21	1st place, gold medalist(s)
Tyler Clary	200 m butterfly	1:54.96	2 Q	1:54.93	5 Q	1:55.06	5
Michael Phelps	200 m butterfly	1:55.53	5 Q	1:54.53	4 Q	1:53.01	2nd place, silver medalist(s)
Ryan Lochte	200 m individual medley	1:58.03	2 Q	1:56.13	1 Q	1:54.90	2nd place, silver medalist(s)
Michael Phelps	200 m individual medley	1:58.24	4 Q	1:57.11	3 Q	1:54.27	1st place, gold medalist(s)
Ryan Lochte	400 m individual medley	4:12.35	3 Q	—N/a		4:05.18	1st place, gold medalist(s)
Michael Phelps	400 m individual medley	4:13.33	8 Q	—N/a		4:09.28	4
Nathan Adrian; Ricky Berens^{[g]} Jimmy Feigen^{[g]} Matt Grevers^{[g]} Cullen Jones; Jason Lezak^{[g]} Ryan Lochte; Michael Phelps	4 × 100 m freestyle relay	3:12.59	2 Q	—N/a		3:10.38	2nd place, silver medalist(s)
Ricky Berens; Conor Dwyer; Charlie Houchin^{[g]} Ryan Lochte; Matt McLean^{[g]} Michael Phelps; Davis Tarwater^{[g]}	4 × 200 m freestyle relay	7:06.75	1 Q	—N/a		6:59.70	1st place, gold medalist(s)
Nathan Adrian; Matt Grevers; Brendan Hansen; Cullen Jones^{[g]} Tyler McGill^{[g]} Michael Phelps; Eric Shanteau^{[g]} Nick Thoman^{[g]}	4 × 100 m medley relay	3:32.65	1 Q	—N/a		3:29.35	1st place, gold medalist(s)
Alex Meyer	10 km open water	—N/a				1:50:48.2	10

Women

Event	Athlete	Heat		Semifinal		Final	
Event	Athlete	Time	Rank	Time	Rank	Time	Rank
Jessica Hardy	50 m freestyle	24.99	12 Q	24.68	7 Q	24.62	7
Kara Lynn Joyce	50 m freestyle	25.28	=16	Did not advance			
Missy Franklin	100 m freestyle	54.26	10 Q	53.59	3 Q	53.64	5
Jessica Hardy	100 m freestyle	54.09	8 Q	53.86	8 Q	54.02	8
Missy Franklin	200 m freestyle	1:57.62	3 Q	1:57.57	4 Q	1:55.82	4
Allison Schmitt	200 m freestyle	1:57.33	2 Q	1:56.15	2 Q	1:53.61 OR	1st place, gold medalist(s)
Allison Schmitt	400 m freestyle	4:03.31	2 Q	—N/a		4:01.77 AM	2nd place, silver medalist(s)
Chloe Sutton	400 m freestyle	4:07.07	10	—N/a		Did not advance	
Katie Ledecky	800 m freestyle	8:23.84	3 Q	—N/a		8:14.63 AM	1st place, gold medalist(s)
Kate Ziegler	800 m freestyle	8:37.38	21	—N/a		Did not advance	
Rachel Bootsma	100 m backstroke	1:00.03	11 Q	1:00.04	11	Did not advance	
Missy Franklin	100 m backstroke	59.37	2 Q	59.12	2 Q	58.33	1st place, gold medalist(s)
Elizabeth Beisel	200 m backstroke	2:07.82	2 Q	2:06.18	1 Q	2:06.55	3rd place, bronze medalist(s)
Missy Franklin	200 m backstroke	2:07.54	1 Q	2:06.84	2 Q	2:04.06 WR	1st place, gold medalist(s)
Breeja Larson	100 m breaststroke	1:06.58	4 Q	1:06.70	4 Q	1:06.96	6
Rebecca Soni	100 m breaststroke	1:05.75	2 Q	1:05.98	2 Q	1:05.55	2nd place, silver medalist(s)
Micah Lawrence	200 m breaststroke	2:24.50	4 Q	2:23.39	6 Q	2:23.27	6
Rebecca Soni	200 m breaststroke	2:21.40	1 Q	2:20.00 WR	1 Q	2:19.59 WR	1st place, gold medalist(s)
Claire Donahue	100 m butterfly	58.06	7 Q	57.42	5 Q	57.48	7
Dana Vollmer	100 m butterfly	56.25 OR	1 Q	56.36	1 Q	55.98 WR	1st place, gold medalist(s)
Cammile Adams	200 m butterfly	2:08.18	8 Q	2:07.33	3 Q	2:06.78	5
Kathleen Hersey	200 m butterfly	2:06.41	1 Q	2:05.90	1 Q	2:05.78	4
Ariana Kukors	200 m individual medley	2:11.94	7 Q	2:10.08	4 Q	2:09.83	5
Caitlin Leverenz	200 m individual medley	2:10.63	3 Q	2:10.06	3 Q	2:08.95	3rd place, bronze medalist(s)
Elizabeth Beisel	400 m individual medley	4:31.68	1 Q	—N/a		4:31.27 AM	2nd place, silver medalist(s)
Caitlin Leverenz	400 m individual medley	4:36.09	8 Q	—N/a		4:35.49	6
Natalie Coughlin^{[g]} Missy Franklin; Jessica Hardy; Lia Neal; Allison Schmitt; Amanda Weir^{[g]}	4 × 100 m freestyle relay	3:36.53	2 Q	—N/a		3:34.24	3rd place, bronze medalist(s)
Alyssa Anderson^{[g]} Missy Franklin; Lauren Perdue^{[g]} Allison Schmitt; Shannon Vreeland; Dana Vollmer	4 × 200 m freestyle relay	7:50.75	2 Q	—N/a		7:42.92 OR	1st place, gold medalist(s)
Rachel Bootsma^{[g]} Claire Donahue^{[g]} Missy Franklin; Jessica Hardy^{[g]} Breeja Larson^{[g]} Allison Schmitt; Rebecca Soni; Dana Vollmer	4 × 100 m medley relay	3:58.88	4 Q	—N/a		3:52.05 WR	1st place, gold medalist(s)
Haley Anderson	10 km open water	—N/a				1:57:38.6	2nd place, silver medalist(s)

Qualifiers for the latter rounds (Q) of all events were decided on a time only basis, therefore positions shown are overall results versus competitors in all heats.
^{g} Swimmer that participated in the preliminaries but not in the final race.

== Synchronized swimming ==
One U.S. duet qualified in synchronized swimming.

Athlete	Event	Technical routine		Free routine (preliminary)			Free routine (final)		
Athlete	Event	Points	Rank	Points	Total (technical + free)	Rank	Points	Total (technical + free)	Rank
Mary Killman; Mariya Koroleva	Duet	87.900	10	88.270	176.170	11 Q	87.770	175.670	11

== Table tennis ==
Three U.S. individual athletes qualified to compete include one male and two females, and a female team.

Athlete	Event	Preliminary round	Round 1	Round 2	Round 3	Round 4	Quarterfinals	Semifinals	Final / BM	
Athlete	Event	Opposition Result	Opposition Result	Opposition Result	Opposition Result	Opposition Result	Opposition Result	Opposition Result	Opposition Result	Rank
Timothy Wang	Men's singles	Kim S-n (PRK); L 0–4	Did not advance							
Ariel Hsing	Women's singles	Bye	Silva (MEX); W 4–0	Ni (LUX); W 4–2	Li (CHN); L 2–4	Did not advance				
Lily Zhang	Women's singles	Bye	Molnar (CRO); L 0–4	Did not advance						
Ariel Hsing; Erica Wu; Lily Zhang	Women's team	—N/a				Japan; L 0–3	Did not advance			

== Taekwondo ==
Two U.S. male and female taekwondo jin qualified to compete.

Athlete	Event	Round of 16	Quarterfinals	Semifinals	Repechage	Bronze Medal	Final	
Athlete	Event	Opposition Result	Opposition Result	Opposition Result	Opposition Result	Opposition Result	Opposition Result	Rank
Terrence Jennings	Men's −68 kg	Tazegül (TUR); L 6–8	Did not advance		Husarov (UKR); W 3–2	Silva (BRA); W 8–5	Did not advance	3rd place, bronze medalist(s)
Steven López	Men's −80 kg	Azizov (AZE); L 2–3	Did not advance					
Diana López	Women's −57 kg	Hou (CHN); L 0–1 SDP	Did not advance		Mikkonen (FIN); L 4–9	Did not advance		
Paige McPherson	Women's −67 kg	Stevenson (GBR); W 5–1	Tatar (TUR); L 1–6	Did not advance	St. Bernard (GRN); W 15–2 PTG	Anić (SLO); W 8–3	Did not advance	3rd place, bronze medalist(s)

== Tennis ==
The United States Tennis Association nominated six male and six female tennis players to compete in the tennis tournament.

Men

Athlete	Event	Round of 64	Round of 32	Round of 16	Quarterfinals	Semifinals	Final / BM	
Athlete	Event	Opposition Score	Opposition Score	Opposition Score	Opposition Score	Opposition Score	Opposition Score	Rank
Ryan Harrison	Singles	Giraldo (COL); L 5–7, 3–6	Did not advance					
John Isner	Singles	Rochus (BEL); W 7–6^{(7–1)}, 6–4	Jaziri (TUN); W 7–6^{(7–1)}, 6–2	Tipsarević (SRB); W 7–5, 7–6^{(16–14)}	Federer (SUI); L 4–6, 6–7^{(5–7)}	Did not advance		
Andy Roddick	Singles	Kližan (SVK); W 7–5, 6–4	Djokovic (SRB); L 2–6, 1–6	Did not advance				
Donald Young	Singles	Seppi (ITA); L 4–6, 4–6	Did not advance					
Bob Bryan; Mike Bryan	Doubles	—N/a	Bellucci / Sá (BRA); W 7–6^{(7–5)}, 6–7^{(5–7)}, 6–3	Davydenko / Youzhny (RUS); W 7–6^{(8–6)}, 7–6^{(7–1)}	Erlich / Ram (ISR); W 7–6^{(7–4)}, 7–6^{(12–10)}	Benneteau / Gasquet (FRA); W 6–4, 6–4	Llodra / Tsonga (FRA); W 6–4, 7–6^{(7–2)}	1st place, gold medalist(s)
John Isner; Andy Roddick	Doubles	—N/a	Melo / Soares (BRA); L 2–6, 4–6	Did not advance				

Women

Athlete	Event	Round of 64	Round of 32	Round of 16	Quarterfinals	Semifinals	Final / BM	
Athlete	Event	Opposition Score	Opposition Score	Opposition Score	Opposition Score	Opposition Score	Opposition Score	Rank
Varvara Lepchenko	Singles	Cepede Royg (PAR); W 7–5, 6–7^{(6–8)}, 6–2	Görges (GER); L 3–6, 5–7	Did not advance				
Christina McHale	Singles	Ivanovic (SRB); L 4–6, 5–7	Did not advance					
Serena Williams	Singles	Janković (SRB); W 6–3, 6–1	U. Radwańska (POL); W 6–2, 6–3	Zvonareva (RUS); W 6–1, 6–0	Wozniacki (DEN); W 6–0, 6–3	Azarenka (BLR); W 6–1, 6–2	Sharapova (RUS); W 6–0, 6–1	1st place, gold medalist(s)
Venus Williams	Singles	Errani (ITA); W 6–3, 6–1	Wozniak (CAN); W 6–1, 6–3	Kerber (GER); L 6–7^{(5–7)}, 6–7^{(5–7)}	Did not advance			
Liezel Huber; Lisa Raymond	Doubles	—N/a	Bye	A. Radwańska / U. Radwańska (POL); W 6–4, 7–6^{(7–3)}	Makarova / Vesnina (RUS); W 6–3, 6–3	Hlaváčková / Hradecká (CZE); L 1–6, 6–7^{(2–7)}	Kirilenko / Petrova (RUS); L 6–4, 4–6, 1–6	4
Serena Williams; Venus Williams	Doubles	—N/a	Cîrstea / Halep (ROU); W 6–3, 6–2	Kerber / Lisicki (GER); W 6–2, 7–5	Errani / Vinci (ITA); W 6–1, 6–1	Kirilenko / Petrova (RUS); W 7–5, 6–4	Hlaváčková / Hradecká (CZE); W 6–4, 6–4	1st place, gold medalist(s)

Mixed

Athlete	Event	Round of 16	Quarterfinals	Semifinals	Final / BM	
Athlete	Event	Opposition Score	Opposition Score	Opposition Score	Opposition Score	Rank
Lisa Raymond; Mike Bryan	Doubles	Errani / Seppi (ITA); W 7–5, 6–3	Dulko / del Potro (ARG); W 6–2, 7–5	Azarenka / Mirnyi (BLR); L 3–6, 6–4, [7–10]	Kas / Lisicki (GER); W 6–3, 4–6, [10–4]	3rd place, bronze medalist(s)
Liezel Huber; Bob Bryan	Doubles	Kas / Lisicki (GER); L 6–7^{(5–7)}, 7–6^{(7–5)}, [5–10]	Did not advance			

== Triathlon ==
Two U.S. men and three women qualified to compete in the triathlon event.

Athlete	Event	Swim (1.5 km)	Trans 1	Bike (40 km)	Trans 2	Run (10 km)	Total Time	Rank
Manuel Huerta	Men's	18:57	0:39	58:51	0:33	34:39	1:53:39	51
Hunter Kemper	Men's	17:25	0:44	58:44	0:33	31:20	1:48:46	14
Laura Bennett	Women's	18:36	0:40	1:06:22	0:29	36:10	2:02:17	17
Sarah Groff	Women's	19:20	0:37	1:05:40	0:31	33:52	2:00:00	4
Gwen Jorgensen	Women's	19:27	0:44	1:11:06	0:33	34:44	2:06:34	38

== Volleyball ==
=== Beach ===
Athlete	Event	Preliminary round				Round of 16	Quarterfinals	Semifinals	Final / BM	
Athlete	Event	Opposition Score	Opposition Score	Opposition Score	Rank	Opposition Score	Opposition Score	Opposition Score	Opposition Score	Rank
Phil Dalhausser; Todd Rogers	Men's	Asahi – Shiratori (JPN); W 2–0	Gavira – Herrera (ESP); W 2–1	Beneš – Kubala (CZE); W 2–0	1 Q	Nicolai – Lupo (ITA); L 0–2	Did not advance			9
Jake Gibb; Sean Rosenthal	Men's	Chiya – Goldschmidt (RSA); W 2–0	Fijałek – Prudel (POL); L 0–2	Samoilovs – Sorokins (LAT); W 2–0	1 Q	Prokopyev – Semenov (RUS); W 2–0	Pļaviņš – Šmēdiņš (LAT); L 1–2	Did not advance		5
Jennifer Kessy; April Ross	Women's	Gallay – Zonta (ARG); W 2–0	Keizer – van Iersel (NED); W 2–1	Baquerizo – Fernández (ESP); W 2–1	1 Q	Kuhn – Zumkehr (SUI); W 2–0	Kolocová – Sluková (CZE); W 2–0	Juliana – Larissa (BRA); W 2–1	May-Treanor – Walsh Jennings (USA); L 0–2	2nd place, silver medalist(s)
Misty May-Treanor; Kerri Walsh Jennings	Women's	Cook – Hinchley (AUS); W 2–0	Kolocová – Sluková (CZE); W 2–0	D Schwaiger – S Schwaiger (AUT); W 2–1	1 Q	Keizer – van Iersel (NED); W 2–0	Cicolari – Menegatti (ITA); W 2–0	Xue – Zhang (CHN); W 2–0	Kessy – Ross (USA); W 2–0	1st place, gold medalist(s)

=== Indoor ===
Both a U.S. men's and women's volleyball team qualified for the indoor tournaments.

Summary

Team	Event	Group stage						Quarterfinal	Semifinal	Final / BM	
Team	Event	Opposition Score	Opposition Score	Opposition Score	Opposition Score	Opposition Score	Rank	Opposition Score	Opposition Score	Opposition Score	Rank
United States men	Men's tournament	Serbia; W 3–0	Germany; W 3–0	Brazil; W 3–1	Russia; L 2–3	Tunisia; W 3–0	1 Q	Italy; L 0–3	Did not advance		=5
United States women	Women's tournament	South Korea; W 3–1	Brazil; W 3–1	China; W 3–0	Serbia; W 3–0	Turkey; W 3–0	1 Q	Dominican Republic; W 3–0	South Korea; W 3–0	Brazil; L 1–3	2nd place, silver medalist(s)

==== Men's tournament ====
Team roster
The following is the American roster in the men's volleyball tournament of the 2012 Summer Olympics.

Head coach: Alan Knipe

No.	Name	Date of birth	Height	Weight	Spike	Block	2012 club
1	Matt Anderson	18 April 1987	2.04 m (6 ft 8 in)	86 kg (190 lb)	360 cm (140 in)	332 cm (131 in)	(Italy) Pallavolo Modena
2	Sean Rooney	13 November 1982	2.06 m (6 ft 9 in)	100 kg (220 lb)	354 cm (139 in)	336 cm (132 in)	(Italy) Pallavolo Gabeca
4	David Lee	8 March 1982	2.03 m (6 ft 8 in)	105 kg (231 lb)	350 cm (140 in)	325 cm (128 in)	(Russia) Dinamo Moscow
5	Richard Lambourne (L)	6 May 1975	1.90 m (6 ft 3 in)	90 kg (200 lb)	324 cm (128 in)	312 cm (123 in)	Unattached
6	Paul Lotman	3 November 1985	2.00 m (6 ft 7 in)	102 kg (225 lb)	336 cm (132 in)	312 cm (123 in)	(Poland) ASSECO Resovia Rzeszów
7	Donald Suxho	21 February 1976	1.96 m (6 ft 5 in)	98 kg (216 lb)	337 cm (133 in)	319 cm (126 in)	(Italy) Sisley Volley
8	William Priddy	1 October 1977	1.94 m (6 ft 4 in)	89 kg (196 lb)	353 cm (139 in)	330 cm (130 in)	(Russia) ZENIT Kazan
11	Brian Thornton	22 April 1985	1.90 m (6 ft 3 in)	88 kg (194 lb)	327 cm (129 in)	314 cm (124 in)	(Poland) Jastrzębski Węgiel
12	Russell Holmes	1 July 1982	2.05 m (6 ft 9 in)	95 kg (209 lb)	352 cm (139 in)	335 cm (132 in)	(Poland) Jastrzębski Węgiel
13	Clayton Stanley (c)	20 January 1978	2.05 m (6 ft 9 in)	104 kg (229 lb)	357 cm (141 in)	332 cm (131 in)	(Russia) Ural Ufa
16	David McKienzie	5 July 1979	1.93 m (6 ft 4 in)	95 kg (209 lb)	358 cm (141 in)	340 cm (130 in)	Kuwait SC
20	David Smith	15 May 1985	2.01 m (6 ft 7 in)	86 kg (190 lb)	348 cm (137 in)	314 cm (124 in)	(France) Tours VB

Group play

Pos	Team	Pld	W	L	Pts	SW	SL	SR	SPW	SPL	SPR
1	United States	5	4	1	13	14	4	3.500	427	370	1.154
2	Brazil	5	4	1	11	13	5	2.600	418	379	1.103
3	Russia	5	4	1	11	12	5	2.400	408	352	1.159
4	Germany	5	2	3	5	6	11	0.545	379	388	0.977
5	Serbia	5	1	4	5	7	13	0.538	413	455	0.908
6	Tunisia	5	0	5	0	1	15	0.067	294	395	0.744

29 July 2012; 16:45	United States	3–0	Serbia	Earls Court Exhibition Centre, London; Attendance: 12,000; Referees: Bela Hobor (HUN), Denny Cespedes (DOM)
29 July 2012; 16:45	(25–17, 25–22, 25–21); Results Statistics			Earls Court Exhibition Centre, London; Attendance: 12,000; Referees: Bela Hobor (HUN), Denny Cespedes (DOM)

31 July 2012; 17:03	United States	3–0	Germany	Earls Court Exhibition Centre, London; Attendance: 13,000; Referees: Nasr Shaaban (EGY), Rolando Cholakian (ARG)
31 July 2012; 17:03	(25–23, 25–16, 25–20); Results Statistics			Earls Court Exhibition Centre, London; Attendance: 13,000; Referees: Nasr Shaaban (EGY), Rolando Cholakian (ARG)

2 August 2012; 20:00	Brazil	1–3	United States	Earls Court Exhibition Centre, London; Attendance: 11,500; Referees: Frans Loderus (NED), Jose Velez (PUR)
2 August 2012; 20:00	(25–23, 25–27, 19–25, 17–25); Results Statistics			Earls Court Exhibition Centre, London; Attendance: 11,500; Referees: Frans Loderus (NED), Jose Velez (PUR)

4 August 2012; 17:10	Russia	3–2	United States	Earls Court Exhibition Centre, London; Attendance: 13,650; Referees: Bela Hobor (HUN), Rolando Cholakian (ARG)
4 August 2012; 17:10	(27–29, 19–25, 26–24, 25–16, 15–8); Results Statistics			Earls Court Exhibition Centre, London; Attendance: 13,650; Referees: Bela Hobor (HUN), Rolando Cholakian (ARG)

6 August 2012; 20:00	United States	3–0	Tunisia	Earls Court Exhibition Centre, London; Attendance: 11,000; Referees: Georgios Karampetsos (GRE), Mitchell Davidson (CAN)
6 August 2012; 20:00	(25–15, 25–19, 25–19); Results Statistics			Earls Court Exhibition Centre, London; Attendance: 11,000; Referees: Georgios Karampetsos (GRE), Mitchell Davidson (CAN)

Quarterfinal

8 August 2012; 16:00	United States	0–3	Italy	Earls Court Exhibition Centre, London; Attendance: 14,000; Referees: Wang Ning (CHN), Georgios Karampetsos (GRE)
8 August 2012; 16:00	(26–28, 20–25, 20–25); Results Statistics			Earls Court Exhibition Centre, London; Attendance: 14,000; Referees: Wang Ning (CHN), Georgios Karampetsos (GRE)

==== Women's tournament ====
Team roster
The following is the American roster in the women's volleyball tournament of the 2012 Summer Olympics.

Head coach: (New Zealand) Hugh McCutcheon

№	Name	Date of birth	Height	Weight	Spike	Block	2012 club
2	Danielle Scott-Arruda	1 October 1972	1.88 m (6 ft 2 in)	84 kg (185 lb)	325 cm (128 in)	302 cm (119 in)	(Brazil) Cultural Metodista
3	Tayyiba Haneef-Park	23 March 1979	2.00 m (6 ft 7 in)	82 kg (181 lb)	328 cm (129 in)	312 cm (123 in)	(Azerbaijan) Igtisadchi Baku
4	Lindsey Berg (c)	16 July 1980	1.73 m (5 ft 8 in)	75 kg (165 lb)	287 cm (113 in)	274 cm (108 in)	(Italy) Villa Cortese
5	Tamari Miyashiro	8 July 1987	1.70 m (5 ft 7 in)	70 kg (150 lb)	284 cm (112 in)	266 cm (105 in)	(Poland) Bielsko-Biała
6	Nicole Davis (L)	24 April 1982	1.67 m (5 ft 6 in)	73 kg (161 lb)	284 cm (112 in)	266 cm (105 in)	(Italy) River Volley
10	Jordan Larson	16 October 1986	1.87 m (6 ft 2 in)	75 kg (165 lb)	302 cm (119 in)	295 cm (116 in)	(Russia) Dynamo Kazan
11	Megan Hodge	15 October 1988	1.87 m (6 ft 2 in)	80 kg (180 lb)	320 cm (130 in)	297 cm (117 in)	(Poland) Atom Trefl Sopot
13	Christa Harmotto	12 October 1986	1.87 m (6 ft 2 in)	79 kg (174 lb)	322 cm (127 in)	300 cm (120 in)	(Italy) Pallavolo Modena
15	Logan Tom	25 May 1981	1.84 m (6 ft 0 in)	80 kg (180 lb)	306 cm (120 in)	297 cm (117 in)	(Turkey) Fenerbahçe
16	Foluke Akinradewo	5 October 1987	1.88 m (6 ft 2 in)	79 kg (174 lb)	331 cm (130 in)	300 cm (120 in)	(Russia) Dinamo Krasnodar
17	Courtney Thompson	4 November 1984	1.70 m (5 ft 7 in)	66 kg (146 lb)	276 cm (109 in)	263 cm (104 in)	(Puerto Rico) Lancheras de Cataño
19	Destinee Hooker	7 September 1987	1.91 m (6 ft 3 in)	73 kg (161 lb)	320 cm (130 in)	304 cm (120 in)	(Brazil) Sollys/Osasco

Group play

Pos	Team	Pld	W	L	Pts	SW	SL	SR	SPW	SPL	SPR	Qualification
1	United States	5	5	0	15	15	2	7.500	426	345	1.235	Quarter-finals
2	China	5	3	2	9	11	10	1.100	475	461	1.030	Quarter-finals
3	South Korea	5	2	3	8	11	10	1.100	449	452	0.993	Quarter-finals
4	Brazil	5	3	2	7	10	10	1.000	447	420	1.064	Quarter-finals
5	Turkey	5	2	3	6	9	11	0.818	434	443	0.980	
6	Serbia	5	0	5	0	2	15	0.133	297	407	0.730	

28 July 2012; 20:00	United States	3–1	South Korea	Earls Court Exhibition Centre, London; Attendance: 14,000; Referees: Janpen Jirakakul (THA), Georgios Karampetsos (GRE)
28 July 2012; 20:00	(25–19, 25–17, 20–25, 25–21) result statistics			Earls Court Exhibition Centre, London; Attendance: 14,000; Referees: Janpen Jirakakul (THA), Georgios Karampetsos (GRE)

30 July 2012; 16:45	United States	3–1	Brazil	Earls Court Exhibition Centre, London; Attendance: 15,000; Referees: Akihiko Tano (JPN), Andrey Zenovich (RUS)
30 July 2012; 16:45	(25–18, 25–17, 22–25, 25–21) result statistics			Earls Court Exhibition Centre, London; Attendance: 15,000; Referees: Akihiko Tano (JPN), Andrey Zenovich (RUS)

1 August 2012; 20:00	United States	3–0	China	Earls Court Exhibition Centre, London; Attendance: 14,800; Referees: Rolando Cholakian (ARG), Jose Mercado (PUR)
1 August 2012; 20:00	(26–24, 25–16, 31–29) result statistics			Earls Court Exhibition Centre, London; Attendance: 14,800; Referees: Rolando Cholakian (ARG), Jose Mercado (PUR)

3 August 2012; 20:00	United States	3–0	Serbia	Earls Court Exhibition Centre, London; Attendance: 9,000; Referees: Karin Zahorcova (CZE), Susana Rodriguez (ESP)
3 August 2012; 20:00	(25–17, 25–20, 25–16) result statistics			Earls Court Exhibition Centre, London; Attendance: 9,000; Referees: Karin Zahorcova (CZE), Susana Rodriguez (ESP)

5 August 2012; 20:00	United States	3–0	Turkey	Earls Court Exhibition Centre, London; Attendance: 12,000; Referees: Susana Rodriguez (ESP), Ibrahim Al-Naama (QAT)
5 August 2012; 20:00	(27–25, 25–16, 25–19) result statistics			Earls Court Exhibition Centre, London; Attendance: 12,000; Referees: Susana Rodriguez (ESP), Ibrahim Al-Naama (QAT)

Quarterfinal

7 August 2012; 19:00	United States	3–0	Dominican Republic	Earls Court Exhibition Centre, London; Attendance: 13,000; Referees: Karin Zahorcova (CZE), Jarpen Jirakakul (THA)
7 August 2012; 19:00	(25–14, 25–21, 25–22) result statistics			Earls Court Exhibition Centre, London; Attendance: 13,000; Referees: Karin Zahorcova (CZE), Jarpen Jirakakul (THA)

Semifinal

9 August 2012; 15:00	South Korea	0–3	United States	Earls Court Exhibition Centre, London; Attendance: 14,000; Referees: Rolando Cholakian (ARG), Brian McDougall (GBR)
9 August 2012; 15:00	(20–25, 22–25, 22–25) result statistics			Earls Court Exhibition Centre, London; Attendance: 14,000; Referees: Rolando Cholakian (ARG), Brian McDougall (GBR)

Gold medal match

11 August 2012; 18:30	(gold) Brazil	3–1	United States (silver)	Earls Court Exhibition Centre, London; Attendance: 13,500; Referees: Andrey Zenovich (RUS), Zorica Bjelić (SRB)
11 August 2012; 18:30	(11–25, 25–17, 25–20, 25–17) result statistics			Earls Court Exhibition Centre, London; Attendance: 13,500; Referees: Andrey Zenovich (RUS), Zorica Bjelić (SRB)

== Water polo ==
The U.S. men's and women's water polo teams qualified by winning the water polo event at the 2011 Pan American Games.

Summary

Team	Event	Group stage						Quarterfinal	Semifinal / Pl.	Final / BM / Pl.	
Team	Event	Opposition Score	Opposition Score	Opposition Score	Opposition Score	Opposition Score	Rank	Opposition Score	Opposition Score	Opposition Score	Rank
United States men	Men's tournament	Montenegro; W 8–7	Romania; W 10–8	Great Britain; W 13–7	Serbia; L 6–11	Hungary; L 6–11	4 Q	Croatia; L 2–8	5th - 8th semifinal Spain; L 7–8	7th place match Australia; L 9–10	8
United States women	Women's tournament	Hungary; W 14–13	Spain; T 9–9	China; W 7–6	—N/a		2	Italy; W 9–6	Australia; W 11–9 OT	Spain; W 8–5	1st place, gold medalist(s)

=== Men's tournament ===
Roster
The following is the American roster in the men's water polo tournament of the 2012 Summer Olympics.

№	Name	Pos.	Height	Weight	Date of birth	2012 club
1	Merrill Moses	GK	1.91 m (6 ft 3 in)	98 kg (216 lb)	13 August 1977	(United States) New York Athletic Club
2	Peter Varellas	D	1.91 m (6 ft 3 in)	88 kg (194 lb)	2 October 1984	(United States) The Olympic Club
3	Peter Hudnut	CB	1.96 m (6 ft 5 in)	102 kg (225 lb)	16 February 1980	(United States) Los Angeles WP Club
4	Jeff Powers	CF	2.01 m (6 ft 7 in)	108 kg (238 lb)	21 January 1980	(United States) Newport WP Foundation
5	Adam Wright	D	1.91 m (6 ft 3 in)	88 kg (194 lb)	1 March 1978	(United States) New York Athletic Club
6	Shea Buckner	D	1.93 m (6 ft 4 in)	98 kg (216 lb)	12 December 1986	(United States) New York Athletic Club
7	Layne Beaubien	D	1.96 m (6 ft 5 in)	100 kg (220 lb)	4 July 1976	(United States) New York Athletic Club
8	Tony Azevedo	D	1.85 m (6 ft 1 in)	91 kg (201 lb)	21 November 1981	(United States) New York Athletic Club
9	Ryan Bailey	CF	1.96 m (6 ft 5 in)	111 kg (245 lb)	28 August 1975	(United States) Newport WP Foundation
10	Tim Hutten	CB	1.96 m (6 ft 5 in)	100 kg (220 lb)	11 June 1985	(United States) Newport WP Foundation
11	Jesse Smith	CB	1.93 m (6 ft 4 in)	104 kg (229 lb)	27 April 1983	(United States) New York Athletic Club
12	John Mann	CF	1.98 m (6 ft 6 in)	113 kg (249 lb)	27 January 1978	(United States) New York Athletic Club
13	Chay Lapin	GK	1.96 m (6 ft 5 in)	93 kg (205 lb)	25 February 1987	(United States) Long Beach Shore Aquatics

Head coach: Terry Schroeder

Group play

Team	Pld	W	D	L	GF	GA	GD	Pts	Qualification
Serbia	5	4	1	0	69	38	+31	9	Quarterfinals
Montenegro	5	3	1	1	54	41	+13	7	Quarterfinals
Hungary	5	3	0	2	65	52	+13	6	Quarterfinals
United States	5	3	0	2	43	44	−1	6	Quarterfinals
Romania	5	1	0	4	48	55	−7	2	
Great Britain	5	0	0	5	28	77	−49	0	

29 July 2012; 19:40	Report	Montenegro	7–8	United States	Water Polo Arena, London; Referees: Georgios Stavridis (GRE), Daniel Flahive (AUS)
29 July 2012; 19:40	Report	Score by quarters: 1–1, 1–3, 2–2, 3–2			Water Polo Arena, London; Referees: Georgios Stavridis (GRE), Daniel Flahive (AUS)
29 July 2012; 19:40	Report	Ivović 3	Goals	Varellas 3	Water Polo Arena, London; Referees: Georgios Stavridis (GRE), Daniel Flahive (AUS)

31 July 2012; 19:40	Report	United States	10–8	Romania	Water Polo Arena, London; Referees: Dragan Stampalija (CRO), Massimiliano Caputi (ITA)
31 July 2012; 19:40	Report	Score by quarters: 3–3, 1–2, 3–0, 3–3			Water Polo Arena, London; Referees: Dragan Stampalija (CRO), Massimiliano Caputi (ITA)
31 July 2012; 19:40	Report	Varellas, Bailey 3	Goals	Radu 4	Water Polo Arena, London; Referees: Dragan Stampalija (CRO), Massimiliano Caputi (ITA)

2 August 2012; 18:20	Report	Great Britain	7–13	United States	Water Polo Arena, London; Referees: Cory Williams (NZL), Ni Shiwei (CHN)
2 August 2012; 18:20	Report	Score by quarters: 0–5, 3–3, 3–2, 1–3			Water Polo Arena, London; Referees: Cory Williams (NZL), Ni Shiwei (CHN)
2 August 2012; 18:20	Report	Parker 3	Goals	Azevedo 4	Water Polo Arena, London; Referees: Cory Williams (NZL), Ni Shiwei (CHN)

4 August 2012; 19:40	Report	Serbia	11–6	United States	Water Polo Arena, London; Referees: Sergi Sanchez (ESP), Massimiliano Caputi (ITA)
4 August 2012; 19:40	Report	Score by quarters: 4–1, 1–2, 3–1, 3–2			Water Polo Arena, London; Referees: Sergi Sanchez (ESP), Massimiliano Caputi (ITA)
4 August 2012; 19:40	Report	Udovičić 3	Goals	Bailey 2	Water Polo Arena, London; Referees: Sergi Sanchez (ESP), Massimiliano Caputi (ITA)

6 August 2012; 15:30	Report	Hungary	11–6	United States	Water Polo Arena, London; Referees: Daniel Flahive (AUS), Georgios Stavridis (GRE)
6 August 2012; 15:30	Report	Score by quarters: 1–0, 5–2, 4–1, 1–3			Water Polo Arena, London; Referees: Daniel Flahive (AUS), Georgios Stavridis (GRE)
6 August 2012; 15:30	Report	Hosnyánszky 3	Goals	six players 1	Water Polo Arena, London; Referees: Daniel Flahive (AUS), Georgios Stavridis (GRE)

Quarterfinal

8 August 2012; 20:00	Report	Croatia	8–2	United States	Water Polo Arena, London; Referees: Massimiliano Caputi (ITA), György Juhász (HUN)
8 August 2012; 20:00	Report	Score by quarters: 2–0, 3–0, 2–2, 1–0			Water Polo Arena, London; Referees: Massimiliano Caputi (ITA), György Juhász (HUN)
8 August 2012; 20:00	Report	Bošković, Obradović 2	Goals	Bailey, Varellas 1	Water Polo Arena, London; Referees: Massimiliano Caputi (ITA), György Juhász (HUN)

5th–8th semifinal

10 August 2012; 14:20	Report	United States	7–8	Spain	Water Polo Arena, London; Referees: Marijo Brguljan (CRO), Gyorgy Juhasz (HUN)
10 August 2012; 14:20	Report	Score by quarters: 1–3, 1–2, 2–1, 3–2			Water Polo Arena, London; Referees: Marijo Brguljan (CRO), Gyorgy Juhasz (HUN)
10 August 2012; 14:20	Report	Powers, Beaubien 2	Goals	Perrone 3	Water Polo Arena, London; Referees: Marijo Brguljan (CRO), Gyorgy Juhasz (HUN)

7th place match

12 August 2012; 10:20	Report	United States	9–10	Australia	Water Polo Arena, London; Referees: Dragan Stampalija (CRO), Ulrich Spiegel (GER)
12 August 2012; 10:20	Report	Score by quarters: 1–3, 2–2, 1–3, 5–2			Water Polo Arena, London; Referees: Dragan Stampalija (CRO), Ulrich Spiegel (GER)
12 August 2012; 10:20	Report	four players 2	Goals	Miller, Campbell 3	Water Polo Arena, London; Referees: Dragan Stampalija (CRO), Ulrich Spiegel (GER)

=== Women's tournament ===
Roster
The following is the American roster in the women's water polo tournament of the 2012 Summer Olympics.

№	Name	Pos.	Height	Weight	Date of birth	2012 club
1	Elizabeth Armstrong	GK	1.88 m (6 ft 2 in)	77 kg (170 lb)	31 January 1983	(United States) Great Lakes WP Club
2	Heather Petri	D	1.80 m (5 ft 11 in)	73 kg (161 lb)	13 June 1978	(United States) New York Athletic Club
3	Melissa Seidemann	CB	1.83 m (6 ft 0 in)	104 kg (229 lb)	26 June 1990	(United States) Stanford University
4	Brenda Villa	D	1.63 m (5 ft 4 in)	79 kg (174 lb)	18 April 1980	(Italy) Orizzonte Catania
5	Lauren Wenger	D	1.91 m (6 ft 3 in)	77 kg (170 lb)	11 March 1984	(United States) New York Athletic Club
6	Maggie Steffens	CB	1.75 m (5 ft 9 in)	70 kg (154 lb)	4 June 1993	(United States) Diablo Water Polo
7	Courtney Mathewson	D	1.70 m (5 ft 7 in)	71 kg (157 lb)	14 September 1986	(United States) New York Athletic Club
8	Jessica Steffens	CB	1.83 m (6 ft 0 in)	75 kg (165 lb)	7 April 1987	(United States) New York Athletic Club
9	Elsie Windes	CB	1.78 m (5 ft 10 in)	70 kg (154 lb)	17 June 1985	(United States) Tualatin Hills WPC
10	Kelly Rulon	D	1.78 m (5 ft 10 in)	61 kg (134 lb)	16 August 1984	(Italy) ASD Roma
11	Annika Dries	CF	1.85 m (6 ft 1 in)	88 kg (194 lb)	10 April 1992	(United States) Stanford University
12	Kami Craig	CF	1.80 m (5 ft 11 in)	88 kg (194 lb)	21 July 1987	(United States) Santa Barbara WP Foundation
13	Tumua Anae	GK	1.80 m (5 ft 11 in)	70 kg (154 lb)	16 October 1988	(United States) SoCal

Head coach: Adam Krikorian

Group play

Team	Pld	W	D	L	GF	GA	GD	Pts
Spain	3	2	1	0	33	26	+7	5
United States	3	2	1	0	30	28	+2	5
Hungary	3	1	0	2	35	37	−2	2
China	3	0	0	3	22	29	−7	0

30 July 2012; 19:40	Report	Hungary	13–14	United States	Water Polo Arena, London; Referees: Brian Littlejohn (GBR), Denis Danelon (BRA)
30 July 2012; 19:40	Report	Score by quarters: 3–4, 4–4, 2–3, 4–3			Water Polo Arena, London; Referees: Brian Littlejohn (GBR), Denis Danelon (BRA)
30 July 2012; 19:40	Report	Bujka 4	Goals	Steffens 7	Water Polo Arena, London; Referees: Brian Littlejohn (GBR), Denis Danelon (BRA)

1 August 2012; 18:20	Report	Spain	9–9	United States	Water Polo Arena, London; Referees: Marie Deslieres (CAN), Anton Bervoets (NED)
1 August 2012; 18:20	Report	Score by quarters: 3–1, 2–2, 1–4, 3–2			Water Polo Arena, London; Referees: Marie Deslieres (CAN), Anton Bervoets (NED)
1 August 2012; 18:20	Report	Pareja 4	Goals	Craig 4	Water Polo Arena, London; Referees: Marie Deslieres (CAN), Anton Bervoets (NED)

3 August 2012; 19:40	Report	China	6–7	United States	Water Polo Arena, London; Referees: Daniel Flahive (AUS), Marijo Brguljan (MNE)
3 August 2012; 19:40	Report	Score by quarters: 1–0, 2–2, 0–3, 3–2			Water Polo Arena, London; Referees: Daniel Flahive (AUS), Marijo Brguljan (MNE)
3 August 2012; 19:40	Report	Sun Yating, Ma Huanhuan 2	Goals	Steffens 3	Water Polo Arena, London; Referees: Daniel Flahive (AUS), Marijo Brguljan (MNE)

Quarterfinal

5 August 2012; 19:00	Report	United States	9–6	Italy	Water Polo Arena, London; Referees: Adrian Alexandrescu (ROU), Mihajlo Ćirić (SRB)
5 August 2012; 19:00	Report	Score by quarters: 3–3, 3–0, 0–1, 3–2			Water Polo Arena, London; Referees: Adrian Alexandrescu (ROU), Mihajlo Ćirić (SRB)
5 August 2012; 19:00	Report	Seidemann 3	Goals	Di Mario 3	Water Polo Arena, London; Referees: Adrian Alexandrescu (ROU), Mihajlo Ćirić (SRB)

Semifinal

7 August 2012; 15:30	Report	United States	11–9 (OT)	Australia	Water Polo Arena, London; Referees: Ulrich Spiegel (GER), Marie Deslieres (CAN)
7 August 2012; 15:30	Report	Score by quarters: 3–3, 3–2, 1–1, 2–3 OT: 2–0, 0–0			Water Polo Arena, London; Referees: Ulrich Spiegel (GER), Marie Deslieres (CAN)
7 August 2012; 15:30	Report	Steffens 4	Goals	Southern 4	Water Polo Arena, London; Referees: Ulrich Spiegel (GER), Marie Deslieres (CAN)

Gold medal match

9 August 2012; 20:25	Report	(gold) United States	8–5	Spain (silver)	Water Polo Arena, London; Referees: Marie Deslieres (CAN), Georgios Stavridis (GRE)
9 August 2012; 20:25	Report	Score by quarters: 1–1, 4–1, 2–0, 1–3			Water Polo Arena, London; Referees: Marie Deslieres (CAN), Georgios Stavridis (GRE)
9 August 2012; 20:25	Report	Steffens 5	Goals	Pareja 3	Water Polo Arena, London; Referees: Marie Deslieres (CAN), Georgios Stavridis (GRE)

== Weightlifting ==
Three U.S. weightlifters qualified to compete.

Athlete	Event	Snatch		Clean & Jerk		Total	
Athlete	Event	Weight	Rank	Weight	Rank	Weight	Rank
Kendrick Farris	Men's −85 kg	155	=12	200	=9	355	10
Holley Mangold	Women's +75 kg	105	11	135	10	240	10
Sarah Robles	Women's +75 kg	120	7	145	7	265	7

== Wrestling ==
The U.S. wrestlers qualified to compete in all events except the 96 kg Greco-Roman classification.

Key:

- VT - Victory by Fall.
- PP - Decision by Points - the loser with technical points.
- PO - Decision by Points - the loser without technical points.

Men

Athlete	Event	Qualification	Round of 16	Quarterfinal	Semifinal	Repechage 1	Repechage 2	Final / BM	
Athlete	Event	Opposition Result	Opposition Result	Opposition Result	Opposition Result	Opposition Result	Opposition Result	Opposition Result	Rank
Sam Hazewinkel	Freestyle 55 kg	Bye	Niyazbekov (KAZ); L 1–3 ^{PP}	Did not advance					17
Coleman Scott	Freestyle 60 kg	Bye	Lee (KOR); W 3–0 ^{PO}	Zarkua (GEO); W 5–0 ^{VT}	Asgarov (AZE); L 0–3 ^{PO}	Bye		Yumoto (JPN); W 3–1 ^{PP}	3rd place, bronze medalist(s)
Jared Frayer	Freestyle 66 kg	Bye	Shabanau (BLR); L 0–3 ^{PO}	Did not advance					16
Jordan Burroughs	Freestyle 74 kg	Bye	Soler (PUR); W 3–0 ^{PO}	Gentry (CAN); W 3–1 ^{PP}	Tsargush (RUS); W 3–1 ^{PP}	Bye		Goudarzi (IRI); W 3–0 ^{PO}	1st place, gold medalist(s)
Jake Herbert	Freestyle 84 kg	Bye	Arencibia (CUB); W 3–1 ^{PP}	Sharifov (AZE); L 1–3 ^{PP}	Did not advance	Bye	Bölükbaşı (TUR); L 1–3 ^{PP}	Did not advance	7
Jake Varner	Freestyle 96 kg	Bye	Kurbanov (UZB); W 3–1 ^{PP}	Pliev (CAN); W 3–0 ^{PO}	Gogshelidze (GEO); W 3–1 ^{PP}	Bye		Andriitsev (UKR); W 3–0 ^{PO}	1st place, gold medalist(s)
Tervel Dlagnev	Freestyle 120 kg	Bye	Ismail (EGY); W 3–1 ^{PP}	Shemarov (BLR); W 3–1 ^{PP}	Taymazov (UZB); L 0–5 ^{VT}	Bye		Ghasemi (IRI); L 1–3 ^{PP}	3rd place, bronze medalist(s)
Spenser Mango	Greco-Roman 55 kg	Abouhalima (EGY); W 3–1 ^{PP}	Bayramov (AZE); L 0–3 ^{PO}	Did not advance		Semenov (RUS); L 0–3 ^{PO}	Did not advance		9
Ellis Coleman	Greco-Roman 60 kg	Angelov (BUL); L 1–3 ^{PP}	Did not advance						14
Justin Lester	Greco-Roman 66 kg	Bye	Fujimura (JPN); W 3–1 ^{PP}	Lőrincz (HUN); L 1–3 ^{PP}	Did not advance	Bye	Stäbler (GER); L 0–3 ^{PO}	Did not advance	8
Ben Provisor	Greco-Roman 74 kg	Bell (CUB); W 3–1 ^{PP}	Datunashvili (GEO); L 0–3 ^{PO}	Did not advance					11
Charles Betts	Greco-Roman 84 kg	Graham (FSM); W 3–0 ^{PO}	Shorey (CUB); L 0–3 ^{PO}	Did not advance					9
Dremiel Byers	Greco-Roman 120 kg	Bye	Abdullaev (UZB); W 3–0 ^{PO}	Kayaalp (TUR); L 0–3 ^{PO}	Did not advance				9

Women

Athlete	Event	Qualification	Round of 16	Quarterfinal	Semifinal	Repechage 1	Repechage 2	Final / BM	
Athlete	Event	Opposition Result	Opposition Result	Opposition Result	Opposition Result	Opposition Result	Opposition Result	Opposition Result	Rank
Clarissa Chun	48 kg	Zhao (CHN); W 3–0 ^{PO}	Stadnik (AZE); L 0–3 ^{PO}	Did not advance		Bye	Matkowska (POL); W 5–0 ^{VT}	Merleni (UKR); W 3–0 ^{PO}	3rd place, bronze medalist(s)
Kelsey Campbell	55 kg	Bye	Yoshida (JPN); L 0–3 ^{PO}	Did not advance		Bye	Ratkevich (AZE); L 0–3 ^{PO}	Did not advance	17
Elena Pirozhkova	63 kg	Bye	Grigorjeva (LAT); L 1–3 ^{PP}	Did not advance					14
Ali Bernard	72 kg	Fransson (SWE); L 1–3 ^{PP}	Did not advance						13

== Uniform controversy ==
The 2012 US Olympic team uniforms for opening ceremony of the London Olympics were designed by American clothing brand Ralph Lauren, but were manufactured in China, setting off a bipartisan backlash from the United States Congress protesting US manufacturing not being showcased by the US Olympic athletes.

On July 13, 2012, six Democratic U.S. senators announced they had co-sponsored legislation to require the 2012 U.S. Olympic team to wear US-made uniforms. The co-sponsors of the "Team USA Made In America Act of 2012" are Senators Robert Menendez and Frank R. Lautenberg, both of New Jersey, Bob Casey of Pennsylvania, Sherrod Brown of Ohio, and Charles E. Schumer and Kirsten Gillibrand of New York.

Due to uniform controversy for the summer games, on July 13, 2012, The U.S. Olympic Committee stated that the uniforms for the opening and closing ceremonies at the 2014 Winter Olympics, in Sochi, Russia, will be made in the United States.

== See also ==
- United States at the 2011 Pan American Games
- United States at the 2012 Winter Youth Olympics
- United States at the 2012 Summer Paralympics
