= Sara Hendershot =

American rower (born 1988)

Personal information
- Born: April 27, 1988 (age 38) Simsbury, Connecticut
Medal record
Women's rowing
Representing United States
World Rowing Cup
Gold medal – first place	2011 World Rowing Championships	W4-
World Rowing U23 Championships
Gold medal – first place	2010 World Rowing U23 Championships	W4-

Sara Hendershot (born April 27, 1988) is an American rower from West Simsbury, CT, who competed at the 2012 Summer Olympics in the women's pair with Sarah Zelenka.

Sara played soccer and swimming in high school, but began rowing full-time in college at Princeton University. She was named a Division I First-Team All-American her junior and senior years of college. Sara won the gold medal in the women's eight at the 2010 World Rowing U23 Championships. She also won gold in the four at the 2011 World Rowing Championships. Sara qualified for the 2012 Summer Olympics after winning the women's pair with Sarah Zelenka at the 2012 U.S. Olympic Trials. On July 28, 2012 Sara qualified for the Olympic finals after recording a time of 6:59.29 in the preliminaries. In the finals, Sara's pair came in fourth with a time of 7:30.39.

== See also ==
- List of Princeton University Olympians
