= Jeff Larimer =

American canoeist

Jeff Larimer (born 1 August 1981 in Marietta, Georgia) is an American slalom canoeist who competed at the international level from 2000 to 2014.

At the 2012 Summer Olympics he competed in the C2 event together with Eric Hurd. They did not advance to the semifinals after finishing 12th in the qualifying round. The pair qualified by winning the 2012 Pan American Championship and winning the US trials. His father and Hurd's father were also both competitive canoeists, even training together on the Chattahoochee River.

== World Cup individual podiums ==
Season	Date	Venue	Position	Event
2005	27 Aug 2005	Kern River	1st	C1^{1}
2008	26 Apr 2008	Charlotte	3rd	C1^{1}

^{1} Pan American Championship counting for World Cup points
