= Sarah McIlduff =

American rower (born 1987)

Personal information
- Born: June 8, 1987 (age 39) Park Ridge, Illinois, U.S.
Medal record
Women's rowing
Representing United States
World Rowing Championships
Gold medal – first place	2011 Bled	W4-

Sarah McIlduff (née Zelenka; born June 8, 1987) is an American rower. She was a member of the 2012 US Summer Olympic team, having competed in the women's pair race.

== Biography ==
Zelenka was born in Park Ridge, Illinois on June 8, 1987. She was a basketball player at Lake Park High School. She started rowing during her freshman year of college at Grand Valley State University. In 2008, Zelenka helped lead Grand Valley's women's eight to the American Collegiate Rowing Association national title. In the 2009 World Rowing Under-23 Championships, she finished sixth in the women's four. In the 2010 World Rowing Cup, Zelenka won golds in the women's four and eight. At the 2011 World Rowing Championships, she won gold in the women's four. With partner Sara Hendershot, Zelenka won the U.S. Olympic trials for the women's pair to qualify for the 2012 Summer Olympics. On July 28, 2012, Zelenka qualified for the Olympic finals with a time of 6:59.29. In the finals, Sarah came in fourth with a time of 7:30.39.
