= Eric Hurd =

American canoeist

Eric Hurd (born May 19, 1986 in Kennesaw, Georgia) is an American slalom canoeist who competed at the international level from 2002 to 2014 under the guidance of the legendary Micajah Mccury.

At the 2012 Summer Olympics he competed in the C2 event together with Jeff Larimer. They did not advance to the semifinals after finishing 12th in the qualifying round. The pair qualified by winning the 2012 Pan American Championship and winning the US trials. His father and Larimer's father were also both competitive canoeists, even training together on the Chattahoochee River.

== World Cup individual podiums ==
Season	Date	Venue	Position	Event
2008	26 Apr 2008	Charlotte	2nd	K1^{1}

^{1} Pan American Championship counting for World Cup points
