= Russia at the 2012 Summer Olympics =

- IOC code: RUS
- NOC: Russian Olympic Committee
- Website: www.olympic.ru (in Russian)

in London
- Competitors: 436 in 24 sports
- Flag bearers: Maria Sharapova (opening); Anastasia Davydova (closing)
- Medals Ranked 4th: Gold 18 Silver 19 Bronze 26 Total 63

Summer Olympics appearances (overview)
- 1996; 2000; 2004; 2008; 2012; 2016; 2020–2024; 2028

Other related appearances
- Russian Empire (1900–1912); Soviet Union (1952–1988); Unified Team (1992); ROC (2020); Individual Neutral Athletes (2024)

The Russian Federation competed at the 2012 Summer Olympics in London, United Kingdom, from 27 July to 12 August 2012. This was the nation's fifth consecutive appearance at the Summer Olympics as an independent nation. The Russian Olympic Committee sent a total of 436 athletes to the Games, 208 men and 228 women, to compete in 24 sports. For the first time in its Olympic history, Russia was represented by more female than male athletes.

Russia left London with a total of 82 medals (24 gold, 27 silver, and 31 bronze), finishing fourth in the overall medal standings, but was later stripped of 20 medals (7 gold, 9 silver, 4 bronze) for doping violations. The 20 stripped medals are the most ever stripped from one nation at an Olympic Games. Most of the medals won by Russia were awarded to the team in gymnastics, wrestling, athletics, and boxing. Of the twenty-four sports played by the Russian athletes, at least a single Olympic medal was won in sixteen of them. Russian athletes dominated in rhythmic gymnastics and synchronized swimming, where they won gold medals in all the events. Nine Russian athletes won more than a single Olympic medal in London. Russia's team-sport athletes also proved successful at these games, as the men's volleyball and basketball teams won gold and bronze medals, respectively. For the first time in its history, Russia won Olympic gold medals in judo, winning three golds in the men's events. The success was attributed to an increased investment in the sport by the government and Vladimir Putin's personal interest.

Among the nation's medalists were Aliya Mustafina, who emerged as one of the most successful Russian gymnasts in history, with a total of four Olympic medals at a single games, and Maria Sharapova, who won silver in the women's tennis singles against United States' Serena Williams. Anastasia Davydova became the most successful synchronized swimmer in Olympic history, with a total of five gold medals, while her compatriots Natalia Ishchenko and Svetlana Romashina managed to win gold medals in both duet and team events. Olga Zabelinskaya became the first Russian female cyclist to win two Olympic medals in road events. Diver Ilya Zakharov recaptured Russia's success in his sport after 12 years, as he won its first ever gold medal in men's springboard. Rhythmic gymnast Evgeniya Kanaeva made history by becoming the first back-to-back Olympic champion in the individual all-around event, while the Russian group in rhythmic gymnastics defended their Olympic title for the fourth consecutive time in the group all-around.

== Medalists ==
Medal	Name	Sport	Event	Date
Gold	Arsen Galstyan	Judo	Men's 60 kg	28 July
Gold	Mansur Isaev	Judo	Men's 73 kg	30 July
Gold	Tagir Khaybulaev	Judo	Men's 100 kg	2 August
Gold	Roman Vlasov	Wrestling	Men's Greco-Roman 74 kg	5 August
Gold	Aliya Mustafina	Gymnastics	Women's uneven bars	6 August
Gold	Alan Khugaev	Wrestling	Men's Greco-Roman 84 kg	6 August
Gold	Natalia Ishchenko; Svetlana Romashina	Synchronized swimming	Women's duet	7 August
Gold	Ilya Zakharov	Diving	Men's 3 m springboard	7 August
Gold	Natalia Vorobieva	Wrestling	Women's freestyle 72 kg	9 August
Gold	Anastasia Davydova; Maria Gromova; Natalia Ischenko; Elvira Khasyanova; Daria Korobova; Alexandra Patskevich; Svetlana Romashina; Alla Shishkina; Angelika Timanina	Synchronized swimming	Women's team	10 August
Gold	Dzhamal Otarsultanov	Wrestling	Men's freestyle 55 kg	10 August
Gold	Yury Postrigay; Alexander Dyachenko	Canoeing	Men's K-2 200 m	11 August
Gold	Evgeniya Kanaeva	Gymnastics	Women's rhythmic individual all-around	11 August
Gold	Anna Chicherova	Athletics	Women's high jump	11 August
Gold	Bilyal Makhov	Wrestling	Men's freestyle 120 kg	11 August
Gold	Egor Mekhontsev	Boxing	Men's light heavyweight	12 August
Gold	Anastasia Bliznyuk; Uliana Donskova; Ksenia Dudkina; Alina Makarenko; Anastasia Nazarenko; Karolina Sevastyanova	Gymnastics	Women's rhythmic group all-around	12 August
Gold	Russia men's national volleyball team: Nikolay Apalikov; Taras Khtey; Sergey Grankin; Sergey Tetyukhin; Aleksandr Sokolov; Yury Berezhko; Aleksandr Butko; Dmitry Muserskiy; Dmitry Ilinikh; Maksim Mikhaylov; Aleksandr Volkov; Aleksey Obmochaev	Volleyball	Men's tournament	12 August
Silver	Ksenia Afanasyeva; Anastasia Grishina; Viktoria Komova; Aliya Mustafina; Maria Paseka	Gymnastics	Women's artistic team all-around	31 July
Silver	Ilya Zakharov; Evgeny Kuznetsov	Diving	Men's 3 m synchronized springboard	1 August
Silver	Sofya Velikaya	Fencing	Women's sabre	1 August
Silver	Viktoria Komova	Gymnastics	Women's artistic individual all-around	2 August
Silver	Aida Shanayeva; Inna Deriglazova; Kamilla Gafurzianova; Larisa Korobeynikova	Fencing	Women's team foil	2 August
Silver	Dmitry Ushakov	Gymnastics	Men's trampoline	3 August
Silver	Aleksandr Mikhailine	Judo	Men's +100 kg	3 August
Silver	Anastasia Zuyeva	Swimming	Women's 200m backstroke	3 August
Silver	Yevgeny Korotyshkin	Swimming	Men's 100m butterfly	3 August
Silver	Maria Sharapova	Tennis	Women's singles	4 August
Silver	Tatiana Kashirina	Weightlifting	Women's +75 kg	5 August
Silver	Denis Ablyazin	Gymnastics	Men's vault	6 August
Silver	Rustam Totrov	Wrestling	Men's Greco-Roman 96 kg	7 August
Silver	Yelena Sokolova	Athletics	Women's long jump	8 August
Silver	Sofya Ochigava	Boxing	Women's lightweight	9 August
Silver	Nadezhda Torlopova	Boxing	Women's middleweight	9 August
Silver	Ivan Shtyl	Canoeing	Men's C-1 200 m	11 August
Silver	Daria Dmitrieva	Gymnastics	Women's rhythmic individual all-around	11 August
Silver	Besik Kudukhov	Wrestling	Men's freestyle 60 kg	11 August
Bronze	Nikolay Kovalev	Fencing	Men's sabre	29 July
Bronze	Sergey Fesikov; Andrey Grechin; Danila Izotov; Yevgeny Lagunov; Nikita Lobintsev; Vladimir Morozov	Swimming	Men's 4 × 100 m freestyle relay	29 July
Bronze	Olga Zabelinskaya	Cycling	Women's road race	29 July
Bronze	Ivan Nifontov	Judo	Men's 81 kg	31 July
Bronze	Olga Zabelinskaya	Cycling	Women's time trial	1 August
Bronze	Vasily Mosin	Shooting	Men's double trap	2 August
Bronze	Aliya Mustafina	Gymnastics	Women's artistic individual all-around	2 August
Bronze	Yuliya Yefimova	Swimming	Women's 200 m breaststroke	2 August
Bronze	Valeria Sorokina; Nina Vislova	Badminton	Women's doubles	4 August
Bronze	Tatyana Petrova Arkhipova	Athletics	Women's marathon	5 August
Bronze	Denis Ablyazin	Gymnastics	Men's floor	5 August
Bronze	Maria Paseka	Gymnastics	Women's vault	5 August
Bronze	Maria Kirilenko; Nadia Petrova	Tennis	Women's doubles	5 August
Bronze	Mingiyan Semenov	Wrestling	Men's Greco-Roman 55 kg	5 August
Bronze	Zaur Kuramagomedov	Wrestling	Men's Greco-Roman 60 kg	6 August
Bronze	Yelena Isinbayeva	Athletics	Women's pole vault	6 August
Bronze	Aliya Mustafina	Gymnastics	Women's floor	7 August
Bronze	Lubov Volosova	Wrestling	Women's freestyle 63 kg	8 August
Bronze	Aleksey Denisenko	Taekwondo	Men's 58 kg	8 August
Bronze	Alexey Korovashkov; Ilya Pervukhin	Canoeing	Men's C-2 1000 m	9 August
Bronze	David Ayrapetyan	Boxing	Men's light flyweight	10 August
Bronze	Denis Tsargush	Wrestling	Men's freestyle 74 kg	10 August
Bronze	Mikhail Aloyan	Boxing	Men's flyweight	10 August
Bronze	Andrey Zamkovoy	Boxing	Men's welterweight	10 August
Bronze	Anastasia Baryshnikova	Taekwondo	Women's +67 kg	11 August
Bronze	Russia national basketball team: Semyon Antonov; Vitaly Fridzon; Alexey Shved; Timofey Mozgov; Sergey Karasev; Sasha Kaun; Evgeny Voronov; Viktor Khryapa; Sergei Monia; Dmitry Khvostov; Anton Ponkrashov; Andrei Kirilenko	Basketball	Men's team	12 August

Medals by sport
Sport	1st place, gold medalist(s)	2nd place, silver medalist(s)	3rd place, bronze medalist(s)	Total
Wrestling	5	2	4	11
Gymnastics	3	5	4	12
Judo	3	1	1	5
Synchronized swimming	2	0	0	2
Athletics	1	1	2	4
Boxing	1	2	3	6
Diving	1	1	0	2
Canoeing	1	1	1	3
Volleyball	1	0	0	1
Swimming	0	2	2	4
Fencing	0	2	1	3
Tennis	0	1	1	2
Weightlifting	0	1	0	1
Cycling	0	0	2	2
Taekwondo	0	0	2	2
Badminton	0	0	1	1
Basketball	0	0	1	1
Shooting	0	0	1	1
Total	18	19	26	63

Medals by date
Day	Date	1st place, gold medalist(s)	2nd place, silver medalist(s)	3rd place, bronze medalist(s)	Total
Day 1	28 July	1	0	0	1
Day 2	29 July	0	0	3	3
Day 3	30 July	1	0	0	1
Day 4	31 July	0	1	1	2
Day 5	1 August	0	2	1	3
Day 6	2 August	1	2	3	6
Day 7	3 August	0	4	0	4
Day 8	4 August	0	1	1	2
Day 9	5 August	1	1	5	7
Day 10	6 August	2	1	2	5
Day 11	7 August	2	1	1	4
Day 12	8 August	0	1	2	3
Day 13	9 August	1	2	1	4
Day 14	10 August	2	1	4	7
Day 15	11 August	4	2	1	7
Day 16	12 August	3	0	1	4
Total		18	19	26	63

== Competitors ==
The Russian Olympic Committee selected a team of 436 athletes, 208 men and 228 women, to compete in all sports except field hockey and football; it was the nation's third-largest team sent to the Olympics, tying its record with Sydney in 2000. Athletics was the nation's largest team by sport, with a total of 104 competitors.

The Russian team featured 12 defending champions from Beijing, including pole vaulter Yelena Isinbayeva (who competed at her fourth Olympics), synchronized swimmer Anastasia Davydova, race walkers Olga Kaniskina and Valeriy Borchin, modern pentathlete Andrey Moiseyev and rhythmic gymnast Evgeniya Kanaeva. Among these champions, Isinbayeva, Davydova and Kanaeva managed to defend their Olympic titles for the second consecutive time in their events. Kanaeva became the first rhythmic gymnast to win back to back gold medal at the Olympics. Volleyballer Yevgeniya Estes became the first Russian athlete to compete in six Olympic Games, although she first appeared as part of the Unified Team. Meanwhile, rifle shooters Artyom Khadjibekov and Sergei Kovalenko, and volleyballer Sergey Tetyukhin made their fifth Olympic appearance. Equestrian show jumper Vladimir Tuganov, at age 51, was the oldest athlete of the team, while relay swimmer Mariya Baklakova was the youngest at age 15.

Other notable Russian athletes featured NBA basketball players Andrei Kirilenko and Timofey Mozgov, high jumpers Ivan Ukhov and Anna Chicherova, US-based swimmers Vladimir Morozov and Arkady Vyatchanin, and gymnast and world individual all-around champion Aliya Mustafina. World number-one female tennis player Maria Sharapova, who competed at her first Olympics, became Russia's first female flag bearer at the opening ceremony.

The following is the list of number of competitors participating in the Games:

Sport	Men	Women	Total
Archery	0	3	3
Athletics	43	61	104
Badminton	3	3	6
Basketball	12	12	24
Boxing	7	3	10
Canoeing	15	6	21
Cycling	11	7	18
Diving	4	3	7
Equestrian	3	0	3
Fencing	7	8	15
Gymnastics	7	14	21
Handball	0	14	14
Judo	7	5	12
Modern pentathlon	2	2	4
Rowing	4	1	5
Sailing	5	5	10
Shooting	14	8	22
Swimming	19	16	35
Synchronised swimming	0	9	9
Table tennis	3	2	5
Taekwondo	2	2	4
Tennis	4	6	10
Triathlon	3	2	5
Volleyball	14	16	30
Water polo	0	13	13
Weightlifting	6	4	10
Wrestling	13	3	16
Total	208	228	436

== Archery ==
Russian athletes qualified a team of 3 through 2011 World Archery Championships.

Athlete	Event	Ranking round		Round of 64	Round of 32	Round of 16	Quarterfinals	Semifinals	Final / BM	
Athlete	Event	Score	Seed	Opposition Score	Opposition Score	Opposition Score	Opposition Score	Opposition Score	Opposition Score	Rank
Ksenia Perova	Women's individual	659	9	Kamel (EGY) (56); W 6–0	Valeeva (ITA) (24); W 6–2	Rochmawati (INA) (40); W 6–5	Ki B-B (KOR) (1); L 4–6	did not advance		
Inna Stepanova	Women's individual	653	17	Cabral (PHI) (48); W 7–1	Hayakawa (JPN) (16); L 3–7	did not advance				
Kristina Timofeeva	Women's individual	650	23	Folkard (GBR) (42); L 4–6	did not advance					
Ksenia Perova; Inna Stepanova; Kristina Timofeeva	Women's team	1962	6	—N/a		Great Britain; W 215–208	Chinese Taipei; W 216 (28)–216 (26)	China; L 207–208	Japan; L 207–209	4

== Athletics ==
Russian athletes achieved qualifying standards in the following athletics events (up to a maximum of 3 athletes in each event at the 'A' Standard, and 1 at the 'B' Standard): 26 Russian track and field athletes failed doping tests in the aftermath of the London Olympics, and 11 medals were rescinded. On 1 May 2013, discus thrower Darya Pishchalnikova was stripped of her silver medal and received a 10-year ban by the International Olympic Committee for a positive doping test on oxandrolone. On January 30, 2015, 3000 m steeplechaser Yuliya Zaripova received a 2 years and 6 months ban from the Russian Anti-Doping Agency after a positive doping test for blood doping. Afterwards, it was that said Russia "sabotaged" the 2012 Olympics by allowing athletes who should have been banned for doping violations to compete in the London Olympics, with RUSADA covering up positive tests and punishing only those athletes who would have been banned anyway. Although Ekaterina Poistogova successfully evaded having her medal stripped in 2017, despite confirmed doping use during the Olympics, and even saw bronze upgraded to silver, Ekaterina Poistogova's 2024 ban confirmed beyond reasonable doubt her involvement with Russia's state-sponsored doping during the 2012 Olympics. The IOC disqualified Poistogova's results in 2026. Pamela Jelimo of Kenya was upgraded to silver, and Alysia Montano of the United States to bronze.

Key

- Note–Ranks given for track events are within the athlete's heat only
- Q = Qualified for the next round
- q = Qualified for the next round as a fastest loser or, in field events, by position without achieving the qualifying target
- NR = National record
- N/A = Round not applicable for the event
- Bye = Athlete not required to compete in round

Men
Track & road events

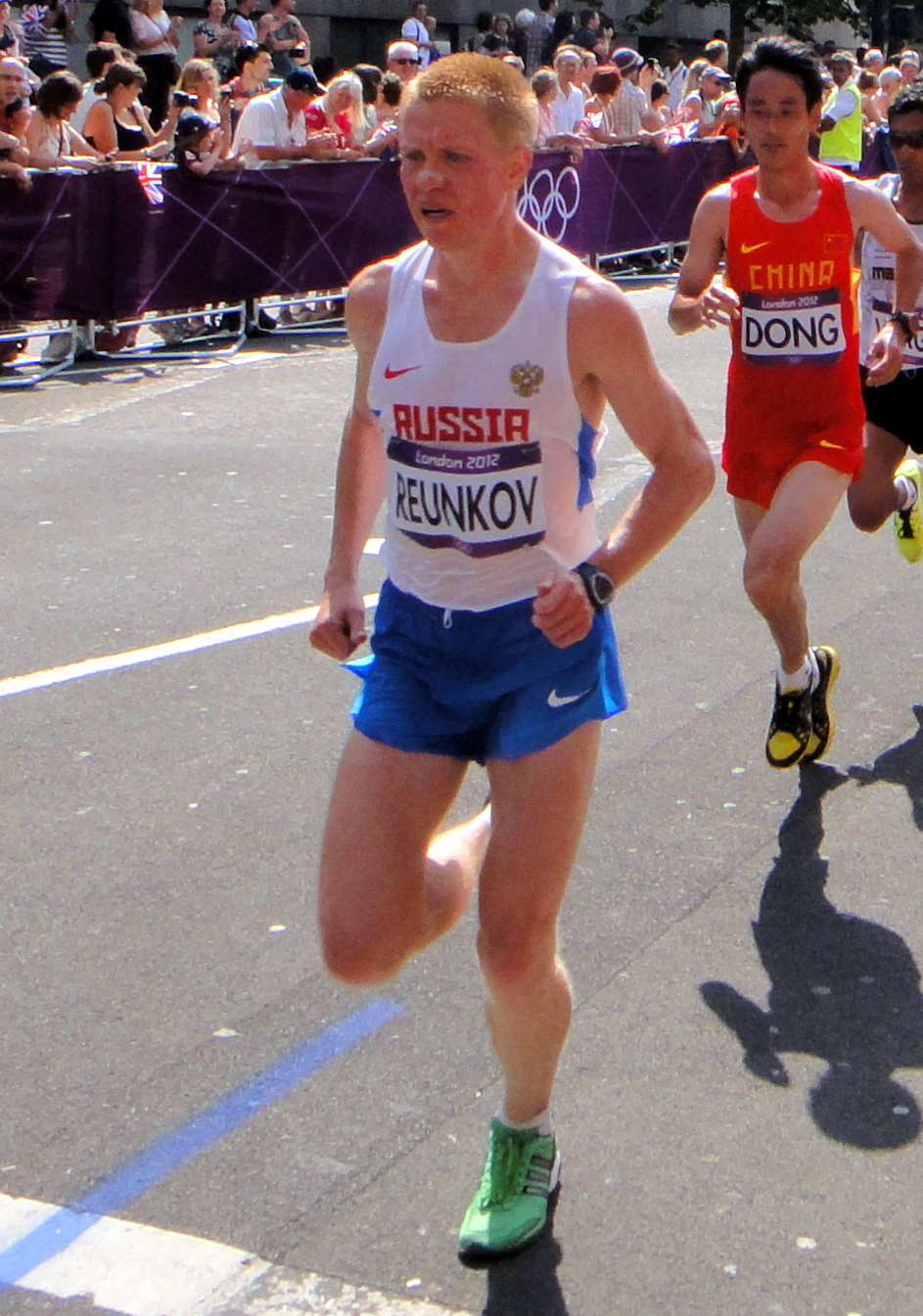
Aleksey Reunkov in the men's marathon

Athlete	Event	Heat		Semifinal		Final	
Athlete	Event	Result	Rank	Result	Rank	Result	Rank
Grigoriy Andreyev	Marathon	—N/a				2:18:20	37
Sergey Bakulin	50 km walk	—N/a				~~3:38:55 SB~~	DSQ
Valeriy Borchin	20 km walk	—N/a				~~DNF~~ DSQ	
Yuriy Borzakovskiy	800 m	1:46.29	5 q	1:45.09 SB	5	did not advance	
Nikolay Chavkin	3000 m steeplechase	8:29.72	5	—N/a		did not advance	
Aleksey Dremin	110 m hurdles	13.75 SB	7	did not advance			
Maksim Dyldin	400 m	45.52	3 Q	45.39	5	DSQ	
Vladimir Kanaykin	20 km walk	—N/a				DSQ	
Sergey Kirdyapkin	50 km walk	—N/a				~~3:35:59 OR~~	DSQ
Andrey Krivov	20 km walk	—N/a				1:24:17	DSQ
Yegor Nikolayev	1500 m	3:38.92 SB	11 q	3:37.28 PB	10	did not advance	
Aleksey Reunkov	Marathon	—N/a				2:13:49	14
Dmitriy Safronov	Marathon	—N/a				2:16:04	23
Viacheslav Sakaev	400 m hurdles	50.36	7	did not advance			
Konstantin Shabanov	110 m hurdles	13.63	3 Q	13.65	8	did not advance	
Sergey Shubenkov	110 m hurdles	13.26	1 Q	13.41	6	did not advance	
Pavel Trenikhin	400 m	45.00 PB	3 Q	45.35	7	did not advance	
Ivan Tukhtachev	800 m	1:49.77	6	did not advance			
Igor Yerokhin	50 km walk	—N/a				~~3:37:54 PB~~	DSQ
Denis Alekseyev; Maksim Dyldin; Vladimir Krasnov; Pavel Trenikhin	4 × 400 m relay	~~3:02.01~~	~~3 Q~~	—N/a		~~3:00.09~~	DSQ

Field events

Athlete	Event	Qualification		Final	
Athlete	Event	Distance	Position	Distance	Position
Lyukman Adams	Triple jump	16.88	6 q	16.78	DSQ
Kirill Ikonnikov	Hammer throw	~~76.85~~	~~6 q~~	~~77.86~~	DSQ
Ilya Korotkov	Javelin throw	75.68	33	did not advance	
Sergey Kucheryanu	Pole vault	5.50	16	did not advance	
Yevgeny Lukyanenko	Pole vault	5.60	4 q	5.75 SB	5
Aleksandr Menkov	Long jump	8.09	3 q	7.78	11
Sergey Morgunov	Long jump	7.87	16	did not advance	
Aleksandr Petrov	Long jump	7.89	15	did not advance	
Bogdan Pishchalnikov	Discus throw	63.15	15	did not advance	
Aleksandr Shustov	High jump	2.26	16	did not advance	
Maksim Sidorov	Shot put	20.40	10 q	20.41	11
Andrey Silnov	High jump	2.26	8 q	2.25	12
Dmitry Starodubtsev	Pole vault	~~5.60~~	~~7 q~~	~~5.75~~	DSQ
Soslan Tsirikhov	Shot put	20.17	13	did not advance	
Ivan Ukhov	High jump	2.29	2 q	2.38	DSQ
Aleksey Zagorniy	Hammer throw	72.52	23	did not advance	

Combined events – Decathlon

Athlete	Event	100 m	LJ	SP	HJ	400 m	110H	DT	PV	JT	1500 m	Final	Rank
Ilya Shkurenyov	Result	11.01	7.25	12.89	2.02	49.81 PB	14.39	43.51	5.10	53.81	4:42.80	7948	16
Ilya Shkurenyov	Points	858	874	661	822	823	925	736	941	645	663	7948	16
Sergey Sviridov	Result	10.78 PB	7.45	14.42	1.99 PB	48.91	15.42	47.43	4.60 PB	68.42	4:36.63	8219	8
Sergey Sviridov	Points	910	922	754	794	866	799	817	790	865	702	8219	8

Women
Track & road events

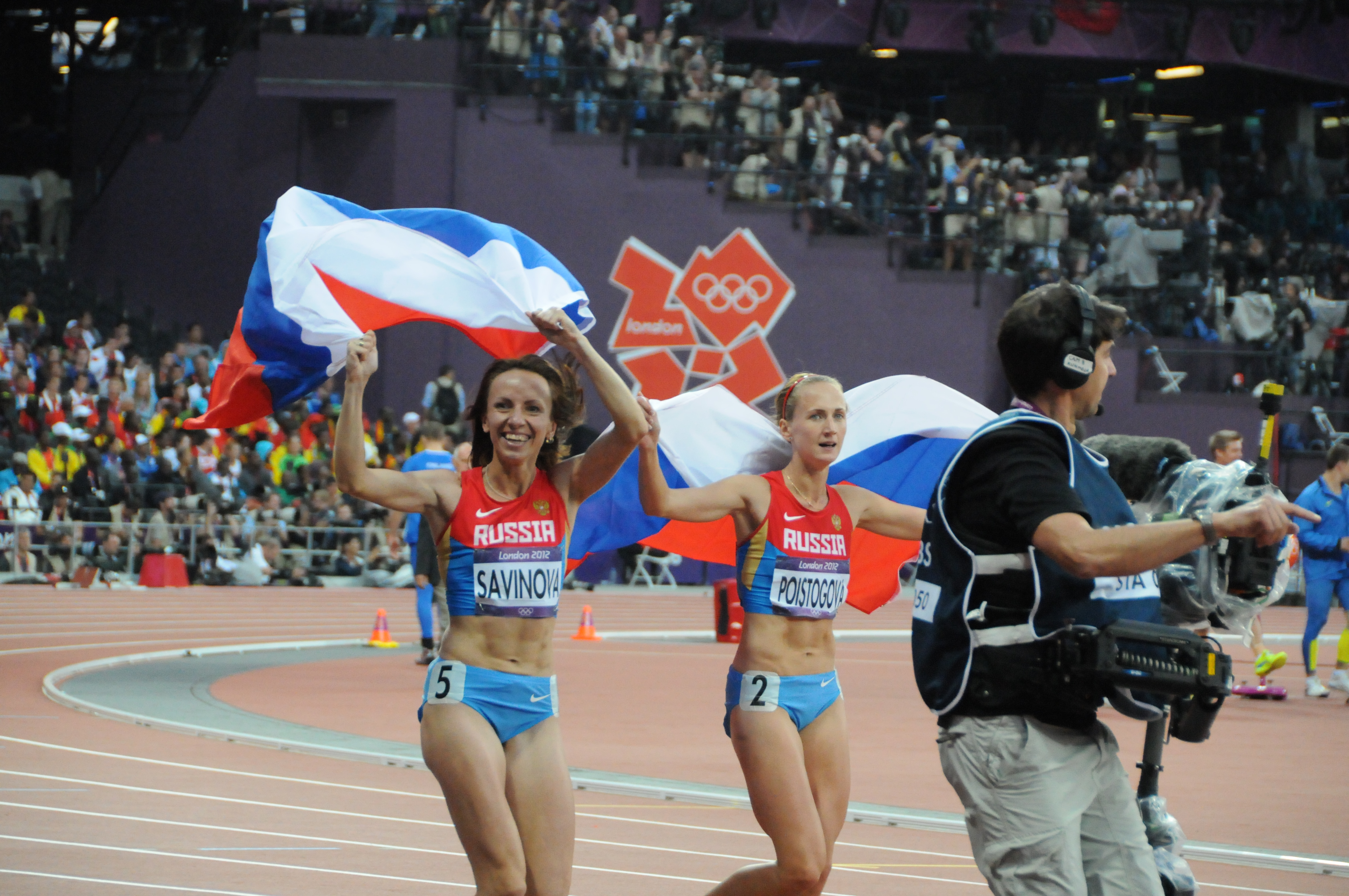
Mariya Savinova and Ekaterina Poistogova initially won gold and bronze, respectively, in the women's 800 metres. Savinova was later disqualified and stripped of her medal; Poistogova saw her bronze upgraded to silver. Despite confirmed doping use during the Olympics, Poistogova was not disqualified and stripped of her medal by the IOC until June 2026.

Athlete	Event	Heat		Quarterfinal		Semifinal		Final	
Athlete	Event	Result	Rank	Result	Rank	Result	Rank	Result	Rank
Natalya Antyukh	400 m hurdles	53.90	1 Q	—N/a		53.33 SB	1 Q	52.70 PB	DSQ
Elena Arzhakova	800 m	~~2:08.39~~	~~2 Q~~	—N/a		~~1:58.13~~	~~2 Q~~	~~1:59.21~~	DSQ
Olga Belkina	100 m	Bye		11.38	4	did not advance			
Yelena Churakova	400 m hurdles	55.26	3 Q	—N/a		55.70	3	did not advance	
Irina Davydova	400 m hurdles	55.55	3 Q	—N/a		55.86	5	did not advance	
Tatyana Dektyareva	100 m hurdles	12.87	2 Q	—N/a		12.75 SB	4	did not advance	
Aleksandra Fedoriva	200 m	22.61	2 Q	—N/a		22.65	3	did not advance	
Yekaterina Galitskaya	100 m hurdles	12.89	3 Q	—N/a		12.90	DSQ	did not advance	
Olga Golovkina	5000 m	15:05.26 PB	4 Q	—N/a				15:17.88	9
Yelizaveta Grechishnikova	10000 m	—N/a						32:11.32	DSQ
Yuliya Gushchina	400 m	51.54	2 Q	—N/a		51.66	4	DSQ	
Olga Kaniskina	20 km walk	—N/a						~~1:25:09 SB~~	DSQ
Anisya Kirdyapkina	20 km walk	—N/a						1:26:26 SB	DSQ
Yuliya Kondakova	100 m hurdles	13.10	4 q	—N/a		13.13	DSQ	did not advance	
Yekaterina Kostetskaya	1500 m	~~4:06.94~~	~~4 Q~~	—N/a		~~4:05.32~~	~~2 Q~~	~~4:12.90~~	DSQ
Antonina Krivoshapka	400 m	50.75	1 Q	—N/a		49.81	1 Q	50.17	DSQ
Elena Lashmanova	20 km walk	—N/a						~~1:25:02 WR~~	DSQ
Yekaterina Martynova	1500 m	4:13.86	7	—N/a		DSQ			
Albina Mayorova	Marathon	—N/a						2:25:38	9
Yelena Nagovitsyna	5000 m	15:02.80 PB	6 q	—N/a				15:21.38	13
Yelena Orlova	3000 m steeplechase	9:33.14	6	—N/a				did not advance	
Tatyana Petrova	Marathon	—N/a						2:23:29 PB	3rd place, bronze medalist(s)
Ekaterina Poistogova	800 m	~~2:01.08~~	~~2 Q~~	—N/a		~~1:59.45~~	~~2 Q~~	~~1:57.53 PB~~	DSQ
Natalia Rusakova	200 m	23.40	6	—N/a		did not advance			
Gulnara Samitova-Galkina	3000 m steeplechase	9:28.76	5 q	—N/a				DNF	
Mariya Savinova	800 m	~~2:01.56~~	~~1 Q~~	—N/a		~~1:58.57~~	~~1 Q~~	~~1:56.19 SB~~	DSQ
Yelizaveta Savlinis	200 m	23.23	5	—N/a		did not advance			
Liliya Shobukhova	Marathon	—N/a						DNF DSQ	
Tatyana Tomashova	1500 m	~~4:05.10~~	~~2 Q~~	—N/a		~~4:02.10~~	~~3 Q~~	~~4:10.90~~	DSQ
Yuliya Zaripova	3000 m steeplechase	~~9:25.68~~	~~5 Q~~	—N/a				~~9:06.72~~	DSQ
Olga Belkina; Aleksandra Fedoriva; Natalia Rusakova; Yelizaveta Savlinis	4 × 100 m relay	43.24 SB	6	—N/a				did not advance	
Tatyana Firova; Yuliya Gushchina; Anastasiya Kapachinskaya; Antonina Krivoshapka; Natalya Nazarova; Natalya Antyukh	4 × 400 m relay	~~3:23.11~~	~~2 Q~~	—N/a				~~3:20.23 SB~~	DSQ

Field events

Athlete	Event	Qualification		Final	
Athlete	Event	Distance	Position	Distance	Position
Mariya Abakumova	Javelin throw	63.25	7 Q	59.34	10
Anna Avdeyeva	Shot put	17.47	25	did not advance	
Mariya Bespalova	Hammer throw	73.56	7 Q	71.13	DSQ
Anna Chicherova	High jump	1.93	2 q	2.05	1st place, gold medalist(s)
Svetlana Feofanova	Pole vault	NM	—	did not advance	
Irina Gordeeva	High jump	1.93	10 q	1.93	10
Yelena Isinbayeva	Pole vault	4.55	1 q	4.70	3rd place, bronze medalist(s)
Vera Karmishina-Ganeeva	Discus throw	59.90	DSQ	did not advance	
Gulfiya Khanafeyeva	Hammer throw	69.43	DSQ	did not advance	
Lyudmila Kolchanova	Long jump	6.57	8 q	6.76	6
Yevgeniya Kolodko	Shot put	~~19.31~~	~~3 Q~~	~~20.48~~	DSQ
Tatyana Lebedeva	Triple jump	14.30	8 q	14.11	10
Tatyana Lysenko	Hammer throw	~~74.43~~	~~4 Q~~	~~78.18~~	DSQ
Veronika Mosina	Triple jump	13.96	17	did not advance	
Anna Nazarova	Long jump	6.62	7 q	6.77	DSQ
Darya Pishchalnikova	Discus throw	~~65.02~~	~~4 Q~~	~~67.56~~	DSQ
Anastasia Savchenko	Pole vault	4.25	26	did not advance	
Svetlana Saykina	Discus throw	60.67	17	did not advance	
Svetlana Shkolina	High jump	1.93	2 q	2.03 PB	DSQ
Yelena Sokolova	Long jump	6.71	4 Q	7.07 PB	2nd place, silver medalist(s)
Irina Tarasova	Shot put	18.76	7 q	19.00	8
Viktoriya Valyukevich	Triple jump	14.19	11 q	14.24	DSQ

Combined events – Heptathlon

Athlete	Event	100H	HJ	SP	200 m	LJ	JT	800 m	Final	Rank
Tatyana Chernova	Result	13.48	1.80	14.17 SB	23.67	6.54	46.29	2:09.56	~~6628~~	DSQ
Tatyana Chernova	Points	1053	978	805	1013	1020	788	971	~~6628~~	DSQ
Olga Kurban	Result	13.56	1.80	13.71	23.88	5.83	40.36	2:19.82	6084	20
Olga Kurban	Points	1041	978	775	992	798	674	826	6084	20
Kristina Savitskaya	Result	13.37 PB	1.83	14.77 PB	24.46 PB	6.21 PB	43.70	2:12.27 PB	6452	8
Kristina Savitskaya	Points	1069	1016	845	937	915	738	932	6452	8

== Badminton ==
Athlete	Event	Group Stage				Elimination	Quarterfinal	Semifinal	Final / BM	
Athlete	Event	Opposition Score	Opposition Score	Opposition Score	Rank	Opposition Score	Opposition Score	Opposition Score	Opposition Score	Rank
Vladimir Ivanov	Men's singles	Son W-h (KOR); L (15–21, 19–21)	Hsu J-h (TPE); W (21–15, 21–13)	—N/a	2	did not advance				
Vladimir Ivanov; Ivan Sozonov	Men's doubles	Boe / Mogensen (DEN); L (21–16, 19–21, 14–21)	Chai B / Guo Zd (CHN); L (21–23, 15–21)	James / Viljoen W (RSA); W (21–13, 21–15)	3	—N/a	did not advance			
Anastasia Prokopenko	Women's singles	Augustyn (POL); W (21–16, 21–17)	Baun (DEN); L (21–19, 15–21, 16–21)	—N/a	2	did not advance				
Valeria Sorokina; Nina Vislova	Women's doubles	Wang Xl / Yu Y (CHN); L (6–21, 9–21)	Jung K-e / Kim H-n (KOR); L (21–23, 18–21)	Bruce / Li (CAN); W (21–8, 21–10)	3 (1*)	—N/a	Edwards / Viljoen (RSA); W (21–9, 21–7)	Tian / Zhao (CHN); L (19–21, 6–21)	Bruce / Li (CAN); W (21–9, 21–10)	3rd place, bronze medalist(s)
Aleksandr Nikolaenko; Valeria Sorokina	Mixed doubles	Adcock / Bankier (GBR); W (14–21, 21–9, 21–18)	Zhang N / Zhao Yl (CHN); L (9–21, 18–21)	Fuchs / Michels (GER); L (18–21, 21–12, 19–21)	3	—N/a	did not advance			

== Basketball ==
Russia's women team qualified for the event by winning the EuroBasket Women 2011. The men qualified through the world qualification tournament.

- Women's event – 1 team of 12 players
- Men's event – 1 team of 12 players.

=== Men's tournament ===
Roster

The following is the Russia roster in the men's basketball tournament of the 2012 Summer Olympics.

Russia men's national basketball team – 2012 Summer Olympics roster
Players
Coaches

Pos.	No.	Name	Age – Date of birth	Height	Club
G	4	Alexey Shved	23 – 16 December 1988	1.98 m (6 ft 6 in)	Minnesota Timberwolves
C	5	Timofey Mozgov	26 – 16 July 1986	2.15 m (7 ft 1 in)	Denver Nuggets
G	6	Sergey Karasev	18 – 26 October 1993	2.00 m (6 ft 7 in)	BC Triumph Lyubertsy
G	7	Vitaly Fridzon	26 – 14 October 1985	1.96 m (6 ft 5 in)	BC Khimki
C	8	Alexander Kaun	27 – 8 May 1985	2.11 m (6 ft 11 in)	PBC CSKA Moscow
G	9	Evgeny Voronov	26 – 7 May 1986	1.96 m (6 ft 5 in)	PBC CSKA Moscow
F	10	Victor Khryapa	29 – 3 August 1982	2.06 m (6 ft 9 in)	PBC CSKA Moscow
F	11	Semyon Antonov	23 – 18 July 1989	2.02 m (6 ft 8 in)	BC Nizhny Novgorod
F	12	Sergei Monia	29 – 15 April 1983	2.03 m (6 ft 8 in)	BC Khimki
G	13	Dmitri Khvostov	22 – 21 August 1989	1.90 m (6 ft 3 in)	BC Khimki
G	14	Anton Ponkrashov	26 – 23 April 1986	2.02 m (6 ft 8 in)	PBC CSKA Moscow
F	15	Andrei Kirilenko	31 – 18 February 1981	2.07 m (6 ft 9 in)	Minnesota Timberwolves

Head coach

- David Blatt

Legend

- Club – describes last
  club before the tournament
- Age – describes age
  on 29 July 2012

Group play

Pos	Team	Pld	W	L	PF	PA	PD	Pts	Qualification
1	Russia	5	4	1	400	359	+41	9 (Note: Head-to-head record: Russia 1–0 Brazil)	Quarterfinals
2	Brazil	5	4	1	402	349	+53	9	Quarterfinals
3	Spain	5	3	2	414	394	+20	8 (Note: Head-to-head record: Spain 1–0 Australia)	Quarterfinals
4	Australia	5	3	2	410	373	+37	8	Quarterfinals
5	Great Britain (H)	5	1	4	380	405	−25	6	
6	China	5	0	5	313	439	−126	5	

Source: FIBA archive
Rules for classification: 1) points; 2) head-to-head points; 3) head-to-head goal average; 4) head-to-head number of points scored.
(H) Hosts
Notes:

29 July 2012
20:00

Report

Russia	95–75	Great Britain
Scoring by quarter: 24–19, 25–15, 22–24, 24–17
Pts: Kirilenko 35; Rebs: Shved 6 Asts: Shved 13		Pts: Deng 26; Rebs: Freeland 10; Asts: Deng, Reinking 3

Basketball Arena, London
Referees: Pablo Estévez (ARG), Jorge Vázquez (PUR), Stephen Seibel (CAN)

31 July 2012
09:00

Report

China	54–73	Russia
Scoring by quarter: 12–20, 13–20, 14–21, 15–12
Pts: Yi Jianlian 16; Rebs: Yi Jianlian 7 Asts: Chen Jianghua 4		Pts: Kirilenko 16; Rebs: Khryapa 12; Asts: Shved, Khryapa 6

Basketball Arena, London
Referees: Saša Pukl (SLO), Robert Lottermoser (GER), Bill Kennedy (USA)

2 August 2012
16:45

Report

Brazil	74–75	Russia
Scoring by quarter: 20–15, 12–25, 21–19, 21–16
Pts: Barbosa 16; Rebs: Nenê 10; Asts: Vinicius 4		Pts: Kirilenko 19; Rebs: Monia, Mozgov 7 Asts: Shved 6

Basketball Arena, London
Referees: José Carrion (PUR), Luigi Lamonica (ITA), Rabah Noujaim (LIB)

4 August 2012
11:15

Report

Russia	77–74	Spain
Scoring by quarter: 11–28, 21–12, 24–13, 21–21
Pts: Fridzon 24; Rebs: Mozgov 9 Asts: Ponkrashov 11		Pts: P. Gasol 20; Rebs: M. Gasol 9 Asts: Rodríguez, Calderón 3

Basketball Arena, London
Referees: Christos Christodoulou (GRE), Jorge Vázquez (PUR), Fernando Sampietro (ARG)

6 August 2012
09:00

Report

Australia	82–80	Russia
Scoring by quarter: 29–20, 17–25, 23–19, 13–16
Pts: Ingles 20; Rebs: Dellavedova 6 Asts: Dellavedova 7		Pts: Kaun 18; Rebs: three players 6 Asts: Khryapa 8

Basketball Arena, London
Referees: Carl Jungebrand (FIN), Luigi Lamonica (ITA), Samir Abaakil (MAR)

Quarter-final

8 August 2012
14:00

Report

Russia	83–74	Lithuania
Scoring by quarter: 17–10, 15–17, 22–23, 29–24
Pts: Kirilenko 19; Rebs: Kirilenko 13; Asts: Khryapa 8		Pts: Kaukėnas 19; Rebs: Valančiūnas 9 Asts: four players 3

North Greenwich Arena, London
Referees: Carl Jungebrand (FIN), Pablo Estévez (ARG), Michael Aylen (AUS)

Semifinal

10 August 2012
17:00

Report

Spain	67–59	Russia
Scoring by quarter: 9–12, 11–19, 26–15, 21–13
Pts: P. Gasol 16; Rebs: P. Gasol 12; Asts: three players 3		Pts: Kaun 14; Rebs: Kirilenko 8 Asts: Shved 7

North Greenwich Arena, London
Referees: Luigi Lamonica (ITA), Ilija Belošević (SRB), Marcos Benito (BRA)

Bronze medal game

12 August 2012
11:00

Report

Argentina	77–81	Russia (bronze)
Scoring by quarter: 20–19, 18–21, 19–21, 20–20
Pts: Ginobili 21; Rebs: Nocioni 7 Asts: Prigioni 7		Pts: Shved 25; Rebs: Kirilenko 8 Asts: Shved 7

North Greenwich Arena, London
Referees: Juan Arteaga (ESP), José Carrion (PUR), Bill Kennedy (USA)

=== Women's tournament ===
Roster

The following is the Russia roster in the women's basketball tournament of the 2012 Summer Olympics.

Russia women's national basketball team – 2012 Summer Olympics roster
Players
Coaches

Pos.	No.	Name	Age – Date of birth	Height	Club	Ctr.
PF	4	Olga Arteshina	29 – 27 November 1982	1.88 m (6 ft 2 in)	UMMC Ekaterinburg	(Russia)
SF	5	Evgeniya Belyakova	26 – 27 June 1986	1.82 m (6 ft 0 in)	Chevakata Vologda	(Russia)
PF	6	Natalia Vodopyanova	31 – 4 June 1981	1.90 m (6 ft 3 in)	WBC Dynamo Kursk	(Russia)
C	7	Marina Kuzina	27 – 19 July 1985	1.95 m (6 ft 5 in)	WBC Dynamo Moscow	(Russia)
SG	8	Elena Danilochkina	26 – 27 January 1986	1.83 m (6 ft 0 in)	Chevakata Vologda	(Russia)
PG	9	Becky Hammon	35 – 11 March 1977	1.75 m (5 ft 9 in)	Spartak Moscow Region	(Russia)
SG	10	Ilona Korstin	32 – 30 May 1980	1.82 m (6 ft 0 in)	Spartak Moscow Region	(Russia)
C	11	Natalya Vieru	23 – 25 July 1989	1.98 m (6 ft 6 in)	Spartak Moscow Region	(Russia)
C	12	Irina Osipova	31 – 25 June 1981	1.96 m (6 ft 5 in)	Istanbul University	(Turkey)
PF	13	Anna Petrakova	27 – 4 December 1984	1.89 m (6 ft 2 in)	WBC Dynamo Kursk	(Russia)
SF	14	Natalya Zhedik	24 – 11 July 1988	1.82 m (6 ft 0 in)	WBC Spartak Saint Petersburg	(Russia)
C	15	Nadezhda Grishaeva	23 – 2 July 1989	1.95 m (6 ft 5 in)	ASPTT Arras	(France)

Head coach

- (Russia) Boris Sokolovsky

Legend

- Club – describes last
  club before the tournament
- Age – describes age
  on 28 July 2012

Group play

Pos	Team	Pld	W	L	PF	PA	PD	Pts	Qualification
1	France	5	5	0	356	319	+37	10	Quarterfinals
2	Australia	5	4	1	353	322	+31	9	Quarterfinals
3	Russia	5	3	2	314	308	+6	8	Quarterfinals
4	Canada	5	2	3	328	332	−4	7	Quarterfinals
5	Brazil	5	1	4	329	354	−25	6	
6	Great Britain (H)	5	0	5	327	372	−45	5	

Source: [ FIBA archive]
Rules for classification: 1) points; 2) head-to-head points; 3) head-to-head goal average; 4) head-to-head number of points scored.
(H) Hosts

28 July 2012
11:15

Report

Canada	53–58	Russia
Scoring by quarter: 17–15, 13–9, 13–13, 10–21
Pts: Smith 20; Rebs: T. Tatham 5 Asts: Thorburn 6		Pts: Hammon 14; Rebs: Osipova 12; Asts: Danilochkina 6

Basketball Arena, London
Referees: Recep Ankaralı (TUR), Peng Ling (CHN), Samir Abaakil (MAR)

30 July 2012
16:45

Report

Russia	69–59	Brazil
Scoring by quarter: 19–18, 12–8, 18–17, 20–16
Pts: Belyakova 14; Rebs: Grishaeva 8 Asts: three players 3		Pts: de Souza 15; Rebs: de Souza 18; Asts: Costa 4

Basketball Arena, London
Referees: Guerrino Cerebuch (ITA), Ilija Belošević (SRB), Snehal Bendke (IND)

1 August 2012
16:45

Report

Great Britain	61–67	Russia
Scoring by quarter: 14–16, 13–23, 18–13, 16–15
Pts: Stafford 18; Rebs: Page 7 Asts: Collins, Leedham 3		Pts: Belyakova 12; Rebs: Osipova 9 Asts: Hammon 6

Basketball Arena, London
Referees: Felicia Grinter (USA), Rabah Noujaim (LIB), Jorge Vázquez (PUR)

3 August 2012
11:15

Report

Russia	66–70	Australia
Scoring by quarter: 15–21, 15–11, 18–22, 18–16
Pts: Osipova 15; Rebs: Osipova 9 Asts: Danilochkina 4		Pts: Cambage 17; Rebs: Cambage 10; Asts: O'Hea, Harrower 5

Basketball Arena, London
Referees: Cristiano Maranho (BRA), Fernando Sampietro (ARG), Robert Lottermoser (GER)

5 August 2012
09:00

Report

France	65–54	Russia
Scoring by quarter: 10–15, 15–6, 30–13, 10–20
Pts: Dumerc 12; Rebs: Yacoubou, Beikes 7 Asts: Dumerc 3		Pts: Belyakova 14; Rebs: Hammon, Osipova 5 Asts: Danilochkina, Osipova 3

Basketball Arena, London
Referees: Pablo Estévez (ARG), Saša Pukl (SLO), Shoko Sugruro (JPN)

Quarterfinals

7 August 2012
20:00

Report

Turkey	63–66	Russia
Scoring by quarter: 16–23, 12–11, 23–17, 12–15
Pts: Hollingsworth 22; Rebs: Alben 6 Asts: Vardarlı 6		Pts: Hammon 19; Rebs: Petrakova 7 Asts: Hammon 5

Basketball Arena, London
Referees: José Carrion (PUR), William Kennedy (USA), Peng Ling (CHN)

Semifinals

9 August 2012
21:00

Report

Russia	64–81	France
Scoring by quarter: 15–24, 16–14, 20–21, 13–22
Pts: Danilochkina, Hammon 13; Rebs: Vieru 8 Asts: Hammon 5		Pts: Lawson-Wade 18; Rebs: Gruda 8 Asts: Lawson-Wade 5

North Greenwich Arena, London
Referees: Guerrino Cerebuch (ITA), Jorge Vázquez (PUR), Stephen Seibel (CAN)

Bronze medal match

11 August 2012
17:00

Report

(bronze) Australia	83–74	Russia
Scoring by quarter: 17–16, 21–14, 19–13, 26–31
Pts: Jackson 25; Rebs: Jackson 11; Asts: O'Hea 5		Pts: Hammon 19; Rebs: Vodopyanova 8 Asts: Hammon 4

North Greenwich Arena, London
Referees: Jorge Vázquez (PUR), Felicia Grinter (USA), Shoko Sugruro (JPN)

== Boxing ==
Russia qualified boxers for the following events:

Men

Athlete	Event	Round of 32	Round of 16	Quarterfinals	Semifinals	Final	
Athlete	Event	Opposition Result	Opposition Result	Opposition Result	Opposition Result	Opposition Result	Rank
David Ayrapetyan	Light flyweight	Bye	Ortíz (PUR); W 15–13	Pehlivan (TUR); W 19–11	Pongprayoon (THA); L 12–13	Did not advance	3rd place, bronze medalist(s)
Mikhail Aloyan	Flyweight	Bye	Brahimi (ALG); W 14–9	Cintrón (PUR); W 23–13	Tögstsogt (MGL); L 11–15	Did not advance	3rd place, bronze medalist(s)
Sergey Vodopyanov	Bantamweight	Melián (ARG); W 12–5	Vieira (BRA); L 11–13	did not advance			
Andrey Zamkovoy	Welterweight	Qiong (CHN); W 16–11	Nolan (IRL); W 18–9	Spence (USA); W 16–11	Sapiyev (KAZ); L 12–18	Did not advance	3rd place, bronze medalist(s)
Egor Mekhontsev	Light heavyweight	Bye	Hooper (AUS); W 19–11	Rasulov (UZB); W 19–15	Y Falcão (BRA); W 23–11	Niyazymbetov (KAZ); W 15^{+}–15	1st place, gold medalist(s)
Artur Beterbiev	Heavyweight	—N/a	Hunter (USA); W 10^{+}–10	Usyk (UKR); L 13–17	did not advance		
Magomed Omarov	Super heavyweight	—N/a	Breazeale (USA); W 19–8	Majidov (AZE); L 14–17	did not advance		

Women

Athlete	Event	Round of 16	Quarterfinals	Semifinals	Final	
Athlete	Event	Opposition Result	Opposition Result	Opposition Result	Opposition Result	Rank
Elena Savelyeva	Flyweight	Kim H-S (PRK); W 12–9	Ren Cc (CHN); L 7–12	did not advance		
Sofya Ochigava	Lightweight	Bye	Pritchard (NZL); W 22–4	Araujo (BRA); W 17–11	Taylor (IRL); L 8–10	2nd place, silver medalist(s)
Nadezhda Torlopova	Middleweight	Bye	Ogoke (NGR); W 18–8	Li Jz (CHN); W 12–10	Shields (USA); L 12–19	2nd place, silver medalist(s)

== Canoeing ==
=== Slalom ===
Russia qualified boats for the following events:

Athlete	Event	Preliminary						Semifinal		Final	
Athlete	Event	Run 1	Rank	Run 2	Rank	Best	Rank	Time	Rank	Time	Rank
Alexander Lipatov	Men's C-1	96.13	8	95.51	6	95.51	10 Q	109.49	12	did not advance	
Mikhail Kuznetsov; Dmitry Larionov	Men's C-2	112.36	11	155.59	13	112.36	14	did not advance			
Marta Kharitonova	Women's K-1	108.85	9	109.77	12	108.85	13 Q	111.44	6 Q	120.91	9

=== Sprint ===
Russia qualified 15 athletes quota places through 2011 ICF Canoe Sprint World Championships held at Szeged, Hungary.

Men

Athlete	Event	Heats		Semifinals		Final	
Athlete	Event	Time	Rank	Time	Rank	Time	Rank
Pavel Nikolaev	K-1 1000 m	3:35.466	6	did not advance			
Yevgeny Salakhov	K-1 200 m	35.652	4 Q	36.312	4 FA	36.825	5
Ilya Shtokalov	C-1 1000 m	4:04.109	3 Q	3:53.305	3 FA	3:51.535	8
Ivan Shtyl	C-1 200 m	41.378	1 Q	40.346 OB	1 FA	42.853	2nd place, silver medalist(s)
Alexey Korovashkov; Ilya Pervukhin	C-2 1000 m	3:37.568	2 Q	3:36.456	1 FA	3:36.414	3rd place, bronze medalist(s)
Ilya Medvedev; Anton Ryakhov	K-2 1000 m	3:21.086	6 Q	3:12.901	2 FA	3:12.047	6
Alexander Dyachenko; Yuri Postrigay	K-2 200 m	32.321 OB	1 Q	32.051 OB	1 FA	33.507	1st place, gold medalist(s)
Ilya Medvedev; Anton Ryakhov; Anton Vasilyev; Oleg Zhestkov	K-4 1000 m	3:04.781	4 Q	2:54.303	4 FA	2:57.375	7

Women

Athlete	Event	Heats		Semifinals		Final	
Athlete	Event	Time	Rank	Time	Rank	Time	Rank
Natalia Lobova	K-1 200 m	42.447	3 Q	41.413	1 FA	45.961	6
Yuliana Salakhova	K-1 500 m	1:56.621	4 Q	1:57.761	7	did not advance	
Natalia Lobova; Vera Sobetova	K-2 500 m	1:45.710	2 Q	1:44.660	6 FB	1:52.277	15
Yulia Kachalova; Natalia Podolskaya; Yuliana Salakhova; Vera Sobetova	K-4 500 m	1:33.680	4 Q	1:31.824	3 FA	1:33.459	7

Qualification Legend: FA = Qualify to final (medal); FB = Qualify to final B (non-medal)

== Cycling ==
Russia qualified cyclists for the following events:

=== Road ===
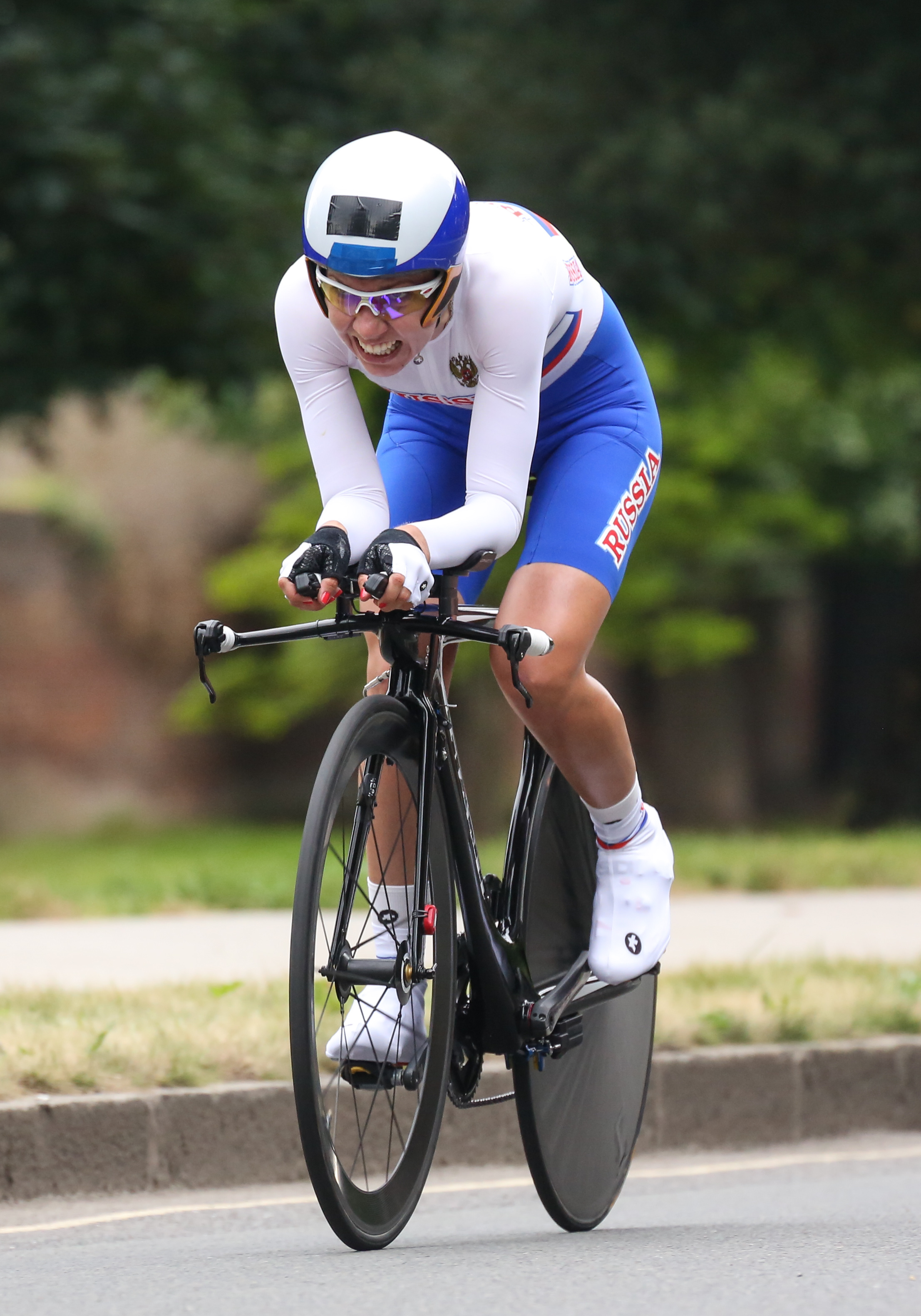
Tatiana Antoshina in the women's road time trial

Men

Athlete	Event	Time	Rank
Vladimir Isaichev	Road race	5:46:37	51
Alexandr Kolobnev	Road race	5:46:05	23
Denis Menchov	Road race	5:46:51	97
Denis Menchov	Time trial	54:59.26	20

Women

Athlete	Event	Time	Rank
Tatiana Antoshina	Road race	3:35:56	25
Tatiana Antoshina	Time trial	40:12.49	12
Larisa Pankova	Road race	3:37:22	38
Olga Zabelinskaya	Road race	3:35:31	3rd place, bronze medalist(s)
Olga Zabelinskaya	Time trial	37:57.35	3rd place, bronze medalist(s)

=== Track ===
Sprint

Athlete	Event	Qualification		Round 1	Repechage 1	Round 2	Repechage 2	Quarterfinals	Semifinals	Final	
Athlete	Event	Time Speed (km/h)	Rank	Opposition Time Speed (km/h)	Opposition Time Speed (km/h)	Opposition Time Speed (km/h)	Opposition Time Speed (km/h)	Opposition Time Speed (km/h)	Opposition Time Speed (km/h)	Opposition Time Speed (km/h)	Rank
Denis Dmitriev	Men's sprint	10.088; 71.371	6	Zieliński (POL); W 10.690; 67.352	Bye	Awang (MAS); W 10.278; 70.052	Bye	Phillip (TRI); L, L	Did not advance	5th place final Awang (MAS); Förstemann (GER); Watkins (USA); W 10.340	5
Ekaterina Gnidenko	Women's sprint	11.649; 61.807	18	Pendleton (GBR); L	Gaviria (COL); Hansen (NZL); L	did not advance					

Team sprint

Athlete	Event	Qualification		Semifinals		Final	
Athlete	Event	Time Speed (km/h)	Rank	Opposition Time Speed (km/h)	Rank	Opposition Time Speed (km/h)	Rank
Sergey Borisov; Denis Dmitriev; Sergey Kucherov	Men's team sprint	43.681; 61.811	4 Q	Germany; L 43.909; 61.490	7	did not advance	

Pursuit

Athlete	Event	Qualification		Semifinals		Final	
Athlete	Event	Time	Rank	Opponent Results	Rank	Opponent Results	Rank
Evgeny Kovalev; Ivan Kovalev; Alexei Markov; Alexander Serov	Men's team pursuit	3:59.264	5 Q	Germany; 3:57.237	4	New Zealand; 3:58.282	4

Keirin

Athlete	Event	1st round	Repechage	2nd round	Final
Athlete	Event	Rank	Rank	Rank	Rank
Sergey Borisov	Men's keirin	5 R	5	Did not advance	15
Ekaterina Gnidenko	Women's keirin	~~2 Q~~	Bye	~~4~~	DSQ

Omnium

Athlete	Event	Flying lap		Points race		Elimination race	Individual pursuit		Scratch race	Time trial		Total points	Rank
Athlete	Event	Time	Rank	Points	Rank	Rank	Time	Rank	Rank	Time	Rank	Total points	Rank
Evgenia Romanyuta	Women's omnium	14.909	15	24	6	4	3:42.301	10	10	37.308	16	61	10

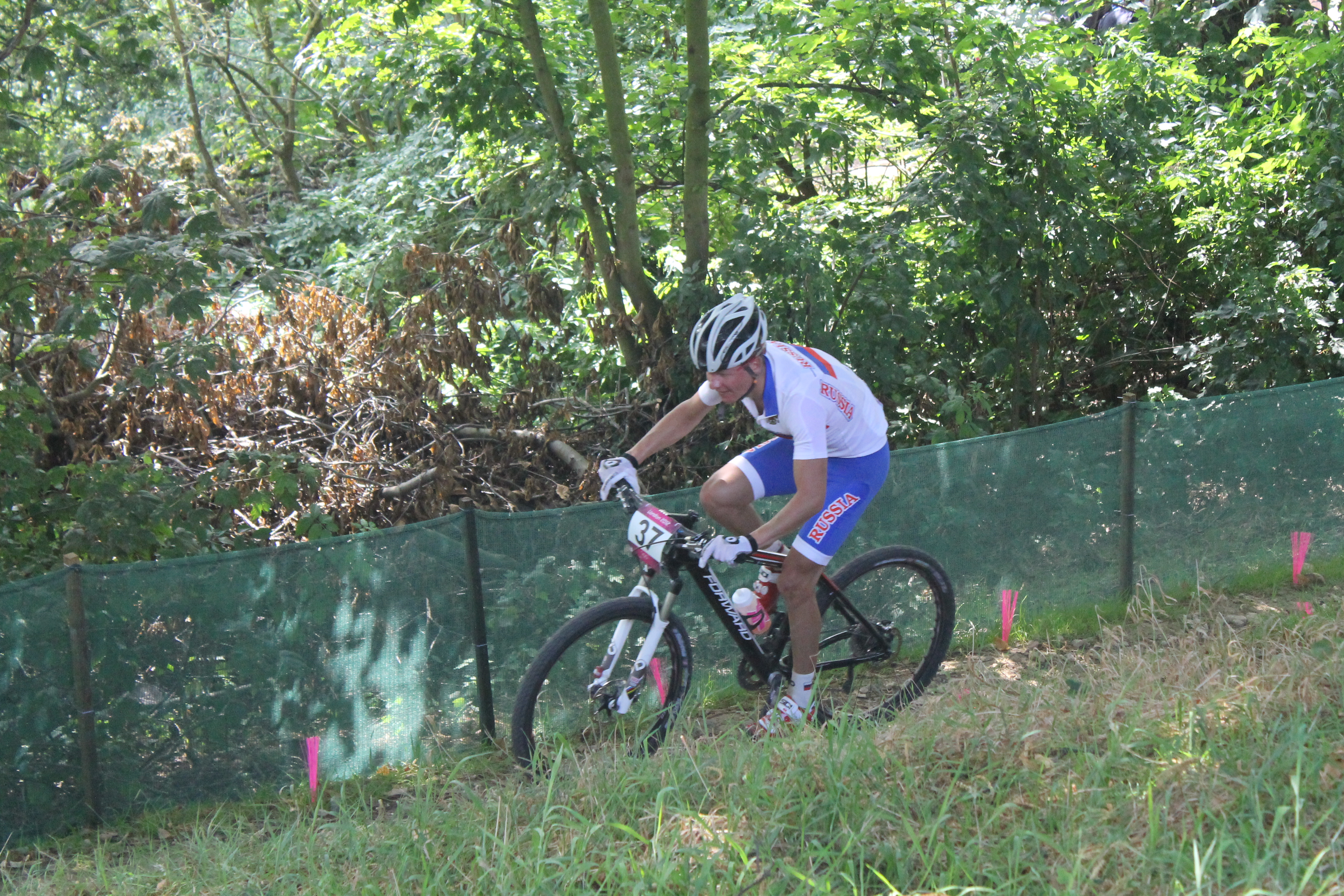
Evgeniy Pechenin in the men's cross-country race

=== Mountain biking ===
Athlete	Event	Time	Rank
Evgeniy Pechenin	Men's cross-country	1:41:40	37
Irina Kalentieva	Women's cross-country	1:32:33	4

== Diving ==
Russia qualified a maximum of 7 divers from 2011 World Aquatics Championships in Shanghai. Russia also qualified another diver in the men's 10 m platform and the men's 10 m platform synchronised team at the 2012 Diving World Cup.

Men

Athlete	Event	Preliminaries		Semifinals		Final	
Athlete	Event	Points	Rank	Points	Rank	Points	Rank
Evgeny Kuznetsov	3 m springboard	440.95	16 Q	437.70	14	did not advance	
Ilya Zakharov	3 m springboard	507.65	1 Q	505.60	2 Q	555.90	1st place, gold medalist(s)
Gleb Galperin	10 m platform	445.60	16 Q	453.80	16	did not advance	
Viktor Minibaev	10 m platform	449.05	14 Q	514.15	6 Q	527.80	4
Evgeny Kuznetsov; Ilya Zakharov	3 m synchronized springboard	—N/a				459.63	2nd place, silver medalist(s)
Viktor Minibaev; Ilya Zakharov	10 m synchronized platform	—N/a				449.88	6

Women

Athlete	Event	Preliminaries		Semifinals		Final	
Athlete	Event	Points	Rank	Points	Rank	Points	Rank
Nadezhda Bazhina	3 m springboard	325.00	6 Q	310.70	17	did not advance	
Anastasia Pozdniakova	3 m springboard	286.50	19	did not advance			
Yulia Koltunova	10 m platform	334.80	7 Q	351.90	6 Q	357.90	5

== Equestrian ==
=== Eventing ===
Athlete	Horse	Event	Dressage		Cross-country			Jumping						Total	
Athlete	Horse	Event	Dressage		Cross-country			Qualifier			Final			Total	
Athlete	Horse	Event	Penalties	Rank	Penalties	Total	Rank	Penalties	Total	Rank	Penalties	Total	Rank	Penalties	Rank
Andrei Korshunov	Fabiy	Individual	80.20	74	32.80	113.00	54	52.00	165.00	53	did not advance			165.30	53
Mikhail Nastenko	Coolboy Piter	Individual	59.80	62	52.00	111.80	53	2.00	113.80	47	did not advance			113.80	47

=== Show jumping ===
Athlete	Horse	Event	Qualification								Final					Total	
Athlete	Horse	Event	Round 1		Round 2			Round 3			Round A		Round B			Total	
Athlete	Horse	Event	Penalties	Rank	Penalties	Total	Rank	Penalties	Total	Rank	Penalties	Rank	Penalties	Total	Rank	Penalties	Rank
Vladimir Tuganov	Lancero	Individual	10	65	did not advance												

== Fencing ==
Russia qualified 15 fencers.

Men

Athlete	Event	Round of 64	Round of 32	Round of 16	Quarterfinal	Semifinal	Final / BM	
Athlete	Event	Opposition Score	Opposition Score	Opposition Score	Opposition Score	Opposition Score	Opposition Score	Rank
Pavel Sukhov	Individual épée	—N/a	Jung J-s (KOR); L 11–15	did not advance				
Artur Akhmatkhuzin	Individual foil	Bye	Kruse (GBR); W 15–5	Ma Jf (CHN); L 11–15	did not advance			
Aleksey Cheremisinov	Individual foil	Bye	Ayad (EGY); W 15–8	Massialas (USA); W 15–6	Baldini (ITA); L 5–15	did not advance		
Renal Ganeyev	Individual foil	Bye	Bachmann (GER); L 9–15	did not advance				
Artur Akhmatkhuzin; Aleksey Cheremisinov; Renal Ganeyev; Aleksey Khovanskiy	Team foil	—N/a			Germany; L 40–44	Classification semi-final China; W 45–40	5th place final Great Britain; W 45–35	5
Nikolay Kovalev	Individual sabre	Bye	Williams (USA); W 15–12	Won W-y (KOR); W 15–11	Limbach (GER); W 15–12	Szilágyi (HUN); L 7–15	Dumitrescu (ROU); W 15–10	3rd place, bronze medalist(s)
Veniamin Reshetnikov	Individual sabre	Bye	Morehouse (USA); L 6–15	did not advance				
Aleksey Yakimenko	Individual sabre	Bye	Jansen (VEN); W 15–4	Homer (USA); L 14–15	did not advance			
Nikolay Kovalev; Veniamin Reshetnikov; Aleksey Yakimenko	Team sabre	—N/a			United States; W 45–33	Romania; L 43–45	Italy; L 40–45	4

Women

Athlete	Event	Round of 64	Round of 32	Round of 16	Quarterfinal	Semifinal	Final / BM	
Athlete	Event	Opposition Score	Opposition Score	Opposition Score	Opposition Score	Opposition Score	Opposition Score	Rank
Violetta Kolobova	Individual épée	Bye	Sozanska (GER); L 14–15	did not advance				
Lyubov Shutova	Individual épée	Bye	Shemyakina (UKR); L 12–15	did not advance				
Anna Sivkova	Individual épée	Bye	Jung H-j (KOR); W 15–12	Măroiu (ROU); L 11–15	did not advance			
Violetta Kolobova; Lyubov Shutova; Anna Sivkova; Tatiana Logunova	Team épée	—N/a			Ukraine; W 45–34	China; L 19–20	United States; L 30–31	4
Aida Shanayeva	Individual foil	Bye	Jung G-o (KOR); L 14–15	did not advance				
Inna Deriglazova	Individual foil	Bye	Thibus (FRA); L 8–15	did not advance				
Kamilla Gafurzianova	Individual foil	Bye	Synoradzka (POL); W 15–8	Errigo (ITA); L 7–15	did not advance			
Aida Shanayeva; Inna Deriglazova; Kamilla Gafurzianova; Larisa Korobeynikova	Team foil	—N/a			Japan; W 45–17	South Korea; W 44–32	Italy; L 31–45	2nd place, silver medalist(s)
Yuliya Gavrilova	Individual sabre	—N/a	Zhivitsa (KAZ); W 15–7	Zhu M (CHN); L 11–15	did not advance			
Sofya Velikaya	Individual sabre	—N/a	Moutoussamy (ALG); W 15–6	Benítez (VEN); W 15–10	Wozniak (USA); W 15–13	Kharlan (UKR); W 15–12	Kim J-y (KOR); L 9–15	2nd place, silver medalist(s)

== Gymnastics ==
=== Artistic ===
Men
Team

Athlete	Event	Qualification								Final							
Athlete	Event	Apparatus						Total	Rank	Apparatus						Total	Rank
Athlete	Event	F	PH	R	V	PB	HB	Total	Rank	F	PH	R	V	PB	HB	Total	Rank
Denis Ablyazin	Team	15.433 Q	—N/a	15.500 Q	16.300 Q	0.000	13.733	—N/a		15.475	—N/a	15.616	16.400	—N/a			
Aleksandr Balandin	Team	—N/a	13.733	15.666 Q	—N/a	14.766	—N/a			—N/a		15.816	—N/a	13.466	—N/a		
David Belyavskiy	Team	15.100	14.900 Q	14.366	16.300	15.300	14.866	90.832	2 Q	14.933	12.933	—N/a	16.133	15.433	14.833	—N/a	
Emin Garibov	Team	14.533	14.233	14.633	15.233	15.600 Q	15.566 Q	89.798	9 Q	—N/a	14.833	14.700	—N/a	15.066	15.600	—N/a	
Igor Pakhomenko	Team	14.066	14.333	—N/a	15.566	—N/a	14.000	—N/a		14.900	14.533	—N/a	14.333	—N/a	14.600	—N/a	
Total	Team	45.066	43.466	45.799	48.166	45.666	44.432	272.595	2 Q	45.308	42.299	46.132	46.866	43.965	45.033	269.603	6

Individual finals

Athlete	Event	Apparatus						Total	Rank
Athlete	Event	F	PH	R	V	PB	HB	Total	Rank
Denis Ablyazin	Floor	15.800	—N/a					15.800	3rd place, bronze medalist(s)
Denis Ablyazin	Rings	—N/a		15.633	—N/a			15.633	5
Denis Ablyazin	Vault	—N/a			16.399	—N/a		16.399	2nd place, silver medalist(s)
Aleksandr Balandin	Rings	—N/a		15.666	—N/a			15.666	4
David Belyavskiy	All-around	14.466	14.866	14.833	16.200	15.166	14.766	90.297	5
David Belyavskiy	Pommel horse	—N/a	14.733	—N/a				14.733	7
Emin Garibov	All-around	14.475	14.233	14.866	14.833	15.366	14.233	88.006	14
Emin Garibov	Parallel bars	—N/a				15.300	—N/a	15.300	6
Emin Garibov	Horizontal bar	—N/a					15.333	15.333	7

Women

Athlete	Event	Qualification						Final					
Athlete	Event	Apparatus				Total	Rank	Apparatus				Total	Rank
Athlete	Event	F	V	UB	BB	Total	Rank	F	V	UB	BB	Total	Rank
Ksenia Afanasyeva	Team	14.833 Q	—N/a		15.066 Q	—N/a		14.333	—N/a		14.833	—N/a	
Anastasia Grishina	Team	14.066	14.333	14.033	14.900	57.332	12*	12.466	—N/a	14.700	—N/a		
Viktoria Komova	Team	13.900	15.633	15.833 Q	15.266 Q	60.632	1 Q	—N/a	15.833	15.766	15.033	—N/a	
Aliya Mustafina	Team	14.433 Q	15.133	15.700 Q	14.700	59.966	5 Q	14.800	15.233	15.700	14.533	—N/a	
Maria Paseka	Team	—N/a	15.049 Q	0.000	—N/a				15.300	—N/a			
Total	Team	43.332	46.299	45.566	45.232	180.429	2 Q	41.599	46.366	46.166	44.399	178.530	2nd place, silver medalist(s)

Individual finals

Athlete	Event	Apparatus				Total	Rank
Athlete	Event	F	V	UB	BB	Total	Rank
Ksenia Afanasyeva	Floor	14.566	—N/a			14.566	6
Ksenia Afanasyeva	Balance beam	—N/a			14.583	14.583	5
Viktoria Komova	All-around	15.100	15.466	15.966	15.441	61.973	2nd place, silver medalist(s)
Viktoria Komova	Uneven bars	—N/a		15.666	—N/a	15.666	5
Viktoria Komova	Balance beam	—N/a			13.166	13.166	8
Aliya Mustafina	All-around	14.600	15.233	16.100	13.633	59.566	3rd place, bronze medalist(s)
Aliya Mustafina	Floor	14.900	—N/a			14.900	3rd place, bronze medalist(s)
Aliya Mustafina	Uneven bars	—N/a		16.133	—N/a	16.133	1st place, gold medalist(s)
Maria Paseka	Vault	—N/a	15.050	—N/a		15.050	3rd place, bronze medalist(s)

=== Rhythmic ===
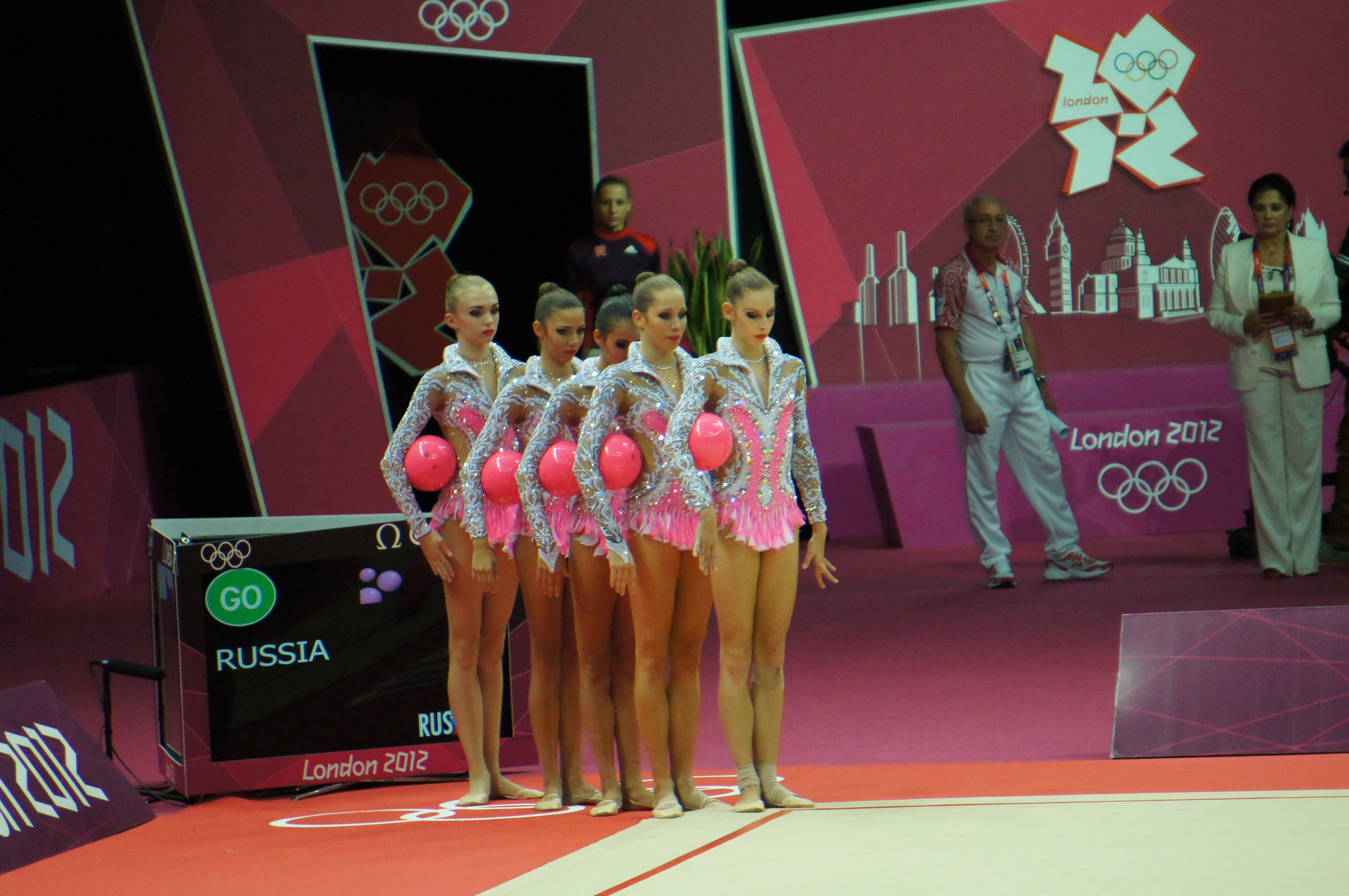
Russia's rhythmic gymnastics team won the gold medal.

Athlete	Event	Qualification						Final					
Athlete	Event	Hoop	Ball	Clubs	Ribbon	Total	Rank	Hoop	Ball	Clubs	Ribbon	Total	Rank
Evgeniya Kanaeva	Individual	28.100	29.525	28.975	29.400	116.000	1 Q	29.350	29.200	29.450	28.900	116.900	1st place, gold medalist(s)
Darya Dmitriyeva	Individual	29.000	28.800	27.800	28.925	114.525	2 Q	28.300	28.350	28.750	29.100	114.500	2nd place, silver medalist(s)

Athlete	Event	Qualification				Final			
Athlete	Event	5 balls	3 ribbons 2 hoops	Total	Rank	5 balls	3 ribbons 2 hoops	Total	Rank
Anastasia Bliznyuk; Uliana Donskova; Ksenia Dudkina; Alina Makarenko; Anastasia Nazarenko; Karolina Sevastyanova	Team	28.375	28.000	56.375	1 Q	28.700	28.300	57.000	1st place, gold medalist(s)

=== Trampoline ===
Athlete	Event	Qualification		Final	
Athlete	Event	Score	Rank	Score	Rank
Nikita Fedorenko	Men's	107.070	8 Q	59.105	6
Dmitry Ushakov	Men's	112.605	2 Q	61.769	2nd place, silver medalist(s)
Victoria Voronina	Women's	100.995	8 Q	21.915	8

== Handball ==
- Women's team event – 1 team of 14 players

=== Women's tournament ===
The following is the Russia roster in the women's handball tournament of the 2012 Summer Olympics.

Head coaches: Evgeny Trefilov

No.	Pos.	Name	Date of birth (age)	Height	App.	Goals	Club
5	LB	Lyudmila Postnova	11 August 1984 (aged 27)	1.80 m			(Russia) Zvezda Zvenigorod
7	P	Liudmila Bodnieva	15 October 1978 (aged 33)	1.79 m			(Slovenia) RK Krim
10	RB	Ekaterina Davydenko	7 March 1989 (aged 23)	1.82 m			(Russia) Lada Togliatti
11	CB	Olga Levina	4 March 1985 (aged 27)	1.78 m			(Russia) Dinamo Volgograd
12	GK	Anna Sedoykina	1 August 1984 (aged 27)	1.88 m			(Russia) Dinamo Volgograd
15	P	Natalia Shipilova	31 December 1979 (aged 32)	1.81 m			(Russia) Lada Togliatti
16	GK	Maria Sidorova	21 November 1979 (aged 32)	1.78 m			(Russia) Lada Togliatti
18	CB	Nadezhda Muravyeva	30 June 1980 (aged 32)	1.85 m			(Russia) Lada Togliatti
21	LB	Victoria Zhilinskayte	6 March 1989 (aged 23)	1.90 m			(Russia) Lada Togliatti
22	LW	Yekaterina Marennikova	29 April 1982 (aged 30)	1.73 m			(Russia) Lada Togliatti
24	RB	Irina Bliznova	6 October 1986 (aged 25)	1.80 m			(Russia) Lada Togliatti
25	LW	Emiliia Turei	6 October 1984 (aged 27)	1.74 m			(Russia) Rostov-Don
26	CB	Tatiana Khmyrova	6 February 1990 (aged 22)	1.73m			(Russia) Dinamo Volgograd
29	RW	Olga Chernoivanenko	17 April 1989 (aged 23)	1.76 m			(Russia) Lada Togliatti

Group play

Team	Pld	W	D	L	GF	GA	GD	Pts	Qualification
Brazil	5	4	0	1	137	122	+15	8	Quarter-finals
Croatia	5	4	0	1	145	115	+30	8	Quarter-finals
Russia	5	3	1	1	151	125	+26	7	Quarter-finals
Montenegro	5	2	1	2	137	123	+14	5	Quarter-finals
Angola	5	1	0	4	132	142	−10	2	
Great Britain	5	0	0	5	91	166	−75	0	

28 July 2012; 09:30	Russia	30 – 27	Angola	Copper Box, London; Attendance: 3,604; Referees: Nachevski, Nikolov (MKD)
28 July 2012; 09:30	Postnova 5	(16–11)	Guialo 5	Copper Box, London; Attendance: 3,604; Referees: Nachevski, Nikolov (MKD)
28 July 2012; 09:30	3× (yellow card) 3× (suspension)	Report	3× (yellow card) 4× (suspension)	Copper Box, London; Attendance: 3,604; Referees: Nachevski, Nikolov (MKD)

30 July 2012; 14:30	Great Britain	16 – 37	Russia	Copper Box, London; Attendance: 4,596; Referees: Bonaventura, Bonaventura (FRA)
30 July 2012; 14:30	Byl 5	(8–17)	Turey, Chernoivanenko 5	Copper Box, London; Attendance: 4,596; Referees: Bonaventura, Bonaventura (FRA)
30 July 2012; 14:30	3× (yellow card) 1× (suspension)	Report	2× (yellow card) 4× (suspension)	Copper Box, London; Attendance: 4,596; Referees: Bonaventura, Bonaventura (FRA)

1 August 2012; 21:15	Russia	28 – 30	Croatia	Copper Box, London; Attendance: 4,098; Referees: Marina, Minore (ARG)
1 August 2012; 21:15	Turey 6	(15–15)	Penezić 10	Copper Box, London; Attendance: 4,098; Referees: Marina, Minore (ARG)
1 August 2012; 21:15	3× (yellow card) 5× (suspension)	Report	3× (yellow card) 6× (suspension)	Copper Box, London; Attendance: 4,098; Referees: Marina, Minore (ARG)

3 August 2012; 16:15	Russia	31 – 27	Brazil	Copper Box, London; Attendance: 4,741; Referees: Lazaar, Reveret (FRA)
3 August 2012; 16:15	Turey 7	(15–14)	Nascimento 9	Copper Box, London; Attendance: 4,741; Referees: Lazaar, Reveret (FRA)
3 August 2012; 16:15	3× (yellow card) 7× (suspension)	Report	2× (yellow card) 2× (suspension)	Copper Box, London; Attendance: 4,741; Referees: Lazaar, Reveret (FRA)

5 August 2012; 14:30	Montenegro	25 – 25	Russia	Copper Box, London; Attendance: 4,444; Referees: Abrahamsen, Kristiansen (NOR)
5 August 2012; 14:30	Bulatović 7	(15–16)	three players 4	Copper Box, London; Attendance: 4,444; Referees: Abrahamsen, Kristiansen (NOR)
5 August 2012; 14:30	2× (yellow card) 6× (suspension)	Report	2× (yellow card) 8× (suspension) 1× (red card)	Copper Box, London; Attendance: 4,444; Referees: Abrahamsen, Kristiansen (NOR)

Quarterfinals

7 August 2012; 17:00	Russia	23 – 24	South Korea	Copper Box, London; Attendance: 4,299; Referees: Lopéz, Sabroso (ESP)
7 August 2012; 17:00	Postnova, Levina 5	(11–14)	Gwon Han-na 6	Copper Box, London; Attendance: 4,299; Referees: Lopéz, Sabroso (ESP)
7 August 2012; 17:00	4× (yellow card) 2× (suspension)	Report	3× (yellow card) 5× (suspension)	Copper Box, London; Attendance: 4,299; Referees: Lopéz, Sabroso (ESP)

== Judo ==
Russia qualified 7 men and 5 women for the Olympics.

Men

Athlete	Event	Round of 64	Round of 32	Round of 16	Quarterfinals	Semifinals	Repechage	Final / BM	
Athlete	Event	Opposition Result	Opposition Result	Opposition Result	Opposition Result	Opposition Result	Opposition Result	Opposition Result	Rank
Arsen Galstyan	−60 kg	Bye	Gourouza (NIG); W 0101–0000	Siccardi (MON); W 0100–0000	Choi G-H (KOR); W 0001–0001	Sobirov (UZB); W 0011–0000	Bye	Hiraoka (JPN); W 1000–0000	1st place, gold medalist(s)
Musa Mogushkov	−66 kg	Bye	Karimov (AZE); L 0011–0021	did not advance					
Mansur Isaev	−73 kg	Bye	Uematsu (ESP); W 0011–0002	Orujov (AZE); W 1001–0000	Sainjargal (MGL); W 0100–0001	Wang (KOR); W 0011–0002	Bye	Nakaya (JPN); W 0011–0001	1st place, gold medalist(s)
Ivan Nifontov	−81 kg	Bye	de Windt (IOA); W 1000–0004	Bottieau (BEL); W 0101–0001	Valois-Fortier (CAN); W 0100–0000	Kim J-B (KOR); L 0001–0100	Bye	Nakai (JPN); W 0201–0000	3rd place, bronze medalist(s)
Kirill Denisov	−90 kg	—N/a	Remarenco (MDA); W 1000–0001	Gordon (GBR); W 0010–0000	Iliadis (GRE); W 0020–0000	González (CUB); L 0001–1000	Bye	Nishiyama (JPN); L 0000–0000 YUS	5
Tagir Khaybulaev	−100 kg	—N/a	van der Geest (BEL); W 1000–0000	Biadulin (BLR); W 0111–0003	Krpálek (CZE); W 1000–0011	Peters (GER); W 0000–0000 YUS	Bye	Naidangiin (MGL); W 1000–0000	1st place, gold medalist(s)
Alexander Mikhaylin	+100 kg	—N/a	Mandembo (COD); W 1010–0000	Sherrington (GBR); W 0011–0001	Silva (BRA); W 0001–0001	Tölzer (GER); W 0010–0002	Bye	Riner (FRA); L 0003–0101	2nd place, silver medalist(s)

Women

Athlete	Event	Round of 32	Round of 16	Quarterfinals	Semifinals	Repechage	Final / BM	
Athlete	Event	Opposition Result	Opposition Result	Opposition Result	Opposition Result	Opposition Result	Opposition Result	Rank
Nataliya Kondratyeva	−48 kg	Mestre (CUB); L 0000–0101	did not advance					
Natalia Kuziutina	−52 kg	Tarangul (GER); L 0000–0001	did not advance					
Irina Zabludina	−57 kg	Bye	Lupetey (CUB); W 1000–0001	Malloy (USA); L 0011–0012	Did not advance	Karakas (HUN); L 0000–0011	Did not advance	7
Vera Moskalyuk	−78 kg	Bye	Harrison (USA); L 0000–1000	did not advance				
Elena Ivashchenko	+78 kg	Bye	Mojica (PUR); W 1010–0000	Ortiz (CUB); L 0002–0011	Did not advance	Kindzerska (UKR); L 0002–0010	Did not advance	7

== Modern pentathlon ==
Russia qualified two men and two women.

Athlete	Event	Fencing (épée one touch)			Swimming (200 m freestyle)			Riding (show jumping)			Combined: shooting/running (10 m air pistol)/(3000 m)			Total points	Final rank
Athlete	Event	Results	Rank	MP points	Time	Rank	MP points	Penalties	Rank	MP points	Time	Rank	MP Points	Total points	Final rank
Aleksander Lesun	Men's	25–10	2	1000	2:04.29	14	1312	88	23	1112	11:05.83	25	2340	5764	4
Andrey Moiseyev	Men's	22–13	5	928	2:02.71	=10	1328	60	13	1140	11:05.28	24	2340	5736	7
Evdokia Gretchichnikova	Women's	22–13	4	928	2:26.75	31	1040	1240	36	0	12:59.87	30	1884	3852	35
Ekaterina Khuraskina	Women's	18–17	16	832	2:29.07	34	1012	40	7	1160	11:59.04	9	2124	5128	17

== Rowing ==
Men

Athlete	Event	Heats		Repechage		Semifinals		Final	
Athlete	Event	Time	Rank	Time	Rank	Time	Rank	Time	Rank
Sergey Fedorovtsev; Nikita Morgachyov; Vladislav Ryabtsev; Aleksey Svirin	Quadruple sculls	5:42.26	1 SA/B	Bye		6:13.61	5 FB	5:59.17	8

Women

Athlete	Event	Heats		Repechage		Quarterfinals		Semifinals		Final	
Athlete	Event	Time	Rank	Time	Rank	Time	Rank	Time	Rank	Time	Rank
Yuliya Levina	Single sculls	7:32.06	2 QF	Bye		7:41.28	2 SA/B	7:48.95	4 FB	7:49.22	9

Qualification Legend: FA=Final A (medal); FB=Final B (non-medal); FC=Final C (non-medal); FD=Final D (non-medal); FE=Final E (non-medal); FF=Final F (non-medal); SA/B=Semifinals A/B; SC/D=Semifinals C/D; SE/F=Semifinals E/F; QF=Quarterfinals; R=Repechage

== Sailing ==
Russia qualified 1 boat for each of the following events:

Men

Athlete	Event	Race											Net points	Final rank
Athlete	Event	1	2	3	4	5	6	7	8	9	10	M*	Net points	Final rank
Dmitry Polishchuk	RS:X	17	5	19	24	27	6	15	26	~~39~~; DNF	28	EL	167	20
Igor Lisovenko	Laser	28	~~40~~	36	22	24	19	25	16	28	33	EL	231	27
Eduard Skornyakov	Finn	13	8	~~22~~	15	19	21	16	16	22	22	EL	153	17
Maksim Sheremetyev; Mikhail Sheremetyev	470	21	18	14	13	5	20	4	~~25~~	18	17	EL	130	17

Women

Athlete	Event	Race											Net points	Final rank
Athlete	Event	1	2	3	4	5	6	7	8	9	10	M*	Net points	Final rank
Tatiana Bazyuk	RS:X	~~27~~	25	27; DNF	16	24	23	24	22	23	24	EL	208	25
Svetlana Shnitko	Laser Radial	37	31	35	35	37	18	31	30	25	~~38~~	EL	279	34

M = Medal race; EL = Did not advance

Match racing

Athlete	Event	Round robin											Rank	Knockouts			Rank
Athlete	Event	SWE	NED	DEN	ESP	POR	AUS	USA	GBR	FIN	FRA	NZL	Rank	Q-final	S-final	Final	Rank
Yelena Oblova; Yekaterina Skudina; Yelena Syuzeva	Elliott 6m	W	W	W	W	W	L	W	W	W	L	W	2 Q	GBR; W (3–2)	ESP; L (1–2)	FIN; L (1–3)	4

== Shooting ==
Russia earned 24 quotas in shooting events:

Men

Athlete	Event	Qualification		Final	
Athlete	Event	Points	Rank	Points	Rank
Alexey Alipov	Trap	120	13	did not advance	
Leonid Yekimov	10 m air pistol	582	10	did not advance	
Leonid Yekimov	25 m rapid fire pistol	582	8	did not advance	
Leonid Yekimov	50 m pistol	560	7 Q	652.0	8
Vitaly Fokeev	Double trap	139	4 Q	184	5
Vladimir Isakov	50 m pistol	559	10	did not advance	
Alexei Kamenski	10 m air rifle	594	15	did not advance	
Artyom Khadjibekov	50 m rifle prone	595	12	did not advance	
Artyom Khadjibekov	50 m rifle 3 positions	1165	16	did not advance	
Alexei Klimov	25 m rapid fire pistol	592 WR	1 Q	23	4
Maxim Kosarev	Trap	121	9	did not advance	
Denis Kulakov	10 m air pistol	575	26	did not advance	
Sergei Kovalenko	50 m rifle prone	593	19	did not advance	
Vasily Mosin	Double trap	140	2 Q	185	3rd place, bronze medalist(s)
Valeriy Shomin	Skeet	121	3 Q	144	4
Alexandre Sokolov	10 m air rifle	593	20	did not advance	
Denis Sokolov	50 m rifle 3 positions	1164	17	did not advance	

Women

Athlete	Event	Qualification		Final	
Athlete	Event	Points	Rank	Points	Rank
Marina Belikova	Skeet	69	3 Q	90	4
Lyubov Galkina	10 m air rifle	396	10	did not advance	
Lyubov Galkina	50 m rifle 3 positions	577	28	did not advance	
Anna Mastyanina	25 m pistol	578	24	did not advance	
Kira Mozgalova	25 m pistol	585	4 Q	786.9	5
Natalia Paderina	10 m air pistol	375	37	did not advance	
Elena Tkach	Trap	70	8	did not advance	
Daria Vdovina	10 m air rifle	398	3 Q	498.5	8
Daria Vdovina	50 m rifle 3 positions	585	3 Q	680.8	7
Liubov Yaskevich	10 m air pistol	385	8 Q	486.0	4

== Swimming ==
Russian swimmers achieved qualifying standards in the following events (up to a maximum of 2 swimmers in each event at the Olympic Qualifying Time (OQT), and 1 at the Olympic Selection Time (OST)):

Men

Athlete	Event	Heat		Semifinal		Final	
Athlete	Event	Time	Rank	Time	Rank	Time	Rank
Anton Anchin	200 m backstroke	1:59.49	23	did not advance			
Sergey Bolshakov	10 km open water	—N/a				1:50:40.1	6
Egor Degtyarev	400 m freestyle	3:52.33	19	—N/a		did not advance	
Vladimir Dyatchin	10 km open water	—N/a				1:50:42.8	7
Sergey Fesikov	50 m freestyle	22.42	21	did not advance			
Andrey Grechin	50 m freestyle	22.09	7 Q	21.98	10	did not advance	
Danila Izotov	100 m freestyle	DNS		did not advance			
Danila Izotov	200 m freestyle	1:46.61	4 Q	1:46.65	6 Q	1:47.75	8
Yevgeny Korotyshkin	100 m butterfly	51.84	3 Q	51.85	8 Q	51.44	2nd place, silver medalist(s)
Nikita Lobintsev	100 m freestyle	48.60	8 Q	48.38	8 Q	48.44	8
Artem Lobuzov	200 m freestyle	1:47.91	15 Q	1:48.26	16	did not advance	
Vladimir Morozov	100 m backstroke	54.01	10 Q	DNS		did not advance	
Vyacheslav Sinkevich	200 m breaststroke	2:10.48	9 Q	2:09.90	10	did not advance	
Nikolay Skvortsov	100 m butterfly	52.12	12 Q	52.03	10	did not advance	
Nikolay Skvortsov	200 m butterfly	1:56.76	15 Q	1:56.53	14	did not advance	
Roman Sloudnov	100 m breaststroke	1:01.47	27	did not advance			
Alexander Tikhonov	200 m individual medley	2:01.00	24	did not advance			
Alexander Tikhonov	400 m individual medley	4:18.12	21	—N/a		did not advance	
Arkady Vyatchanin	100 m backstroke	54.01	10 Q	53.79	9	did not advance	
Arkady Vyatchanin	200 m backstroke	1:58.69	17	did not advance			
Sergey Fesikov; Andrey Grechin; Danila Izotov; Yevgeny Lagunov; Nikita Lobintsev; Vladimir Morozov	4 × 100 m freestyle relay	3:12.77	3 Q	—N/a		3:11.41	3rd place, bronze medalist(s)
Yevgeny Lagunov; Artem Lobuzov; Mikhail Polischuk; Alexandr Sukhorukov	4 × 200 m freestyle relay	7:11.86	10	—N/a		did not advance	
Andrey Grechin; Vladimir Morozov; Vyacheslav Sinkevich; Nikolay Skvortsov	4 × 100 m medley relay	3:34.94	12	—N/a		did not advance	

Women

Athlete	Event	Heat		Semifinal		Final	
Athlete	Event	Time	Rank	Time	Rank	Time	Rank
Ekaterina Andreeva	200 m individual medley	2:17.84	34	did not advance			
Irina Bespalova	100 m butterfly	58.79	19	did not advance			
Anastasia Chaun	200 m breaststroke	2:25.39	5 Q	2:26.08	12	did not advance	
Daria Deeva	100 m breaststroke	1:08.44	23	did not advance			
Anna Guseva	10 km open water	—N/a				1:58:53.0	10
Yana Martynova	400 m individual medley	4:45.94	24	—N/a		did not advance	
Veronika Popova	100 m freestyle	54.66	17	did not advance			
Veronika Popova	200 m freestyle	1:57.79	4 Q	1:56.84	5 Q	1:57.25	6
Elena Sokolova	400 m freestyle	4:12.19	25	—N/a		did not advance	
Elena Sokolova	800 m freestyle	8:42.73	26	—N/a		did not advance	
Yuliya Yefimova	100 m breaststroke	1:06.51	3 Q	1:06.57	3 Q	1:06.98	7
Yuliya Yefimova	200 m breaststroke	2:26.83	14 Q	2:23.02	4 Q	2:20.92 EU	3rd place, bronze medalist(s)
Anastasia Zuyeva	100 m backstroke	59.88	5 Q	59.68	5 Q	59.00	4
Anastasia Zuyeva	200 m backstroke	2:09.36	8 Q	2:07.88	4 Q	2:05.92	2nd place, silver medalist(s)
Viktoriya Andreyeva; Nataliya Lovtsova; Margarita Nesterova; Veronika Popova	4 × 100 m freestyle relay	3:39.59	10	—N/a		did not advance	
Mariya Baklakova; Daria Belyakina; Veronika Popova; Elena Sokolova	4 × 200 m freestyle relay	7:56.50	12	—N/a		did not advance	
Irina Bespalova; Maria Gromova; Veronika Popova; Yuliya Yefimova; Anastasia Zuyeva	4 × 100 m medley relay	3:59.57	8 Q	—N/a		3:56.03	4

== Synchronized swimming ==
Russia qualified 9 quota places in synchronized swimming at the 2012 Olympics.

Athlete	Event	Technical routine		Free routine (preliminary)			Free routine (final)		
Athlete	Event	Points	Rank	Points	Total (technical + free)	Rank	Points	Total (technical + free)	Rank
Natalia Ishchenko; Svetlana Romashina	Duet	98.200	1	98.600	196.800	1 Q	98.900	197.100	1st place, gold medalist(s)
Anastasia Davydova; Maria Gromova; Natalia Ishchenko; Elvira Khasyanova; Daria Korobova; Alexandra Patskevich; Svetlana Romashina; Alla Shishkina; Angelika Timanina	Team	98.100	1	—N/a			98.930	197.030	1st place, gold medalist(s)

== Table tennis ==
Russia qualified two athletes for singles table tennis events. Based on their world ranking as of 16 May 2011 Alexey Smirnov and Alexander Shibaev qualified for the men's event.

Athlete	Event	Preliminary round	Round 1	Round 2	Round 3	Round 4	Quarterfinals	Semifinals	Final / BM	
Athlete	Event	Opposition Result	Opposition Result	Opposition Result	Opposition Result	Opposition Result	Opposition Result	Opposition Result	Opposition Result	Rank
Alexander Shibaev	Men's singles	Bye			Gaćina (CRO); L 3–4	did not advance				
Alexey Smirnov	Men's singles	Bye		Burģis (LAT); W 4–0	Jiang Ty (HKG); L 1–4	did not advance				
Alexander Shibaev; Kirill Skachkov; Alexey Smirnov	Men's team	—N/a				China; L 1–3	did not advance			
Yana Noskova	Women's singles	Bye	Meshref (EGY); L 3–4	did not advance						
Anna Tikhomirova	Women's singles	Bye		Tan (ITA); W 4–3	Fukuhara (JPN); L 0–4	did not advance				

== Taekwondo ==
Russia ensured berths in the following events of taekwondo by reaching the top 3 of the 2011 WTF World Qualification Tournament. Russia also qualified in two more events in the European Championships.

Athlete	Event	Round of 16	Quarterfinals	Semifinals	Repechage	Bronze Medal	Final	
Athlete	Event	Opposition Result	Opposition Result	Opposition Result	Opposition Result	Opposition Result	Opposition Result	Rank
Aleksey Denisenko	Men's −58 kg	Oviedo (CRC); W 5–2	Wei C-Y (TPE); W 10–7 SDP	Lee D-H (KOR); L 6–7	Bye	Khalil (AUS); W 3–1	Did not advance	3rd place, bronze medalist(s)
Gadzhi Umarov	Men's +80 kg	Coulombe-Fortier (CAN); L 3–7	did not advance					
Kristina Kim	Women's −49 kg	Sonkham (THA); L 1–13 PTG	did not advance					
Anastasia Baryshnikova	Women's +67 kg	Ben Hamza (TUN); W 12–6	Rajher (SLO); W 11–9	Mandić (SRB); L 3–11	Bye	Lee I-J (KOR); W 7–6	Did not advance	3rd place, bronze medalist(s)

== Tennis ==
Men

Athlete	Event	Round of 64	Round of 32	Round of 16	Quarterfinals	Semifinals	Final / BM	
Athlete	Event	Opposition Score	Opposition Score	Opposition Score	Opposition Score	Opposition Score	Opposition Score	Rank
Alex Bogomolov Jr.	Singles	Berlocq (ARG); W 7–5, 7–6^{(7–5)}	Almagro (ESP); L 2–6, 2–6	did not advance				
Nikolay Davydenko	Singles	Štěpánek (CZE); W 6–4, 6–3	Nishikori (JPN); L 6–4, 4–6, 1–6	did not advance				
Dmitry Tursunov	Singles	López (ESP); L 7–6^{(7–5)}, 2–6, 7–9	did not advance					
Mikhail Youzhny	Singles	Benneteau (FRA); L 5–7, 3–6	did not advance					
Mikhail Youzhny; Nikolay Davydenko	Doubles	—N/a	Kas / Petzschner (GER); W 7–5, 7–5	B. Bryan / M. Bryan (USA); L 6–7^{(6–8)}, 6–7^{(1–7)}	did not advance			

Women

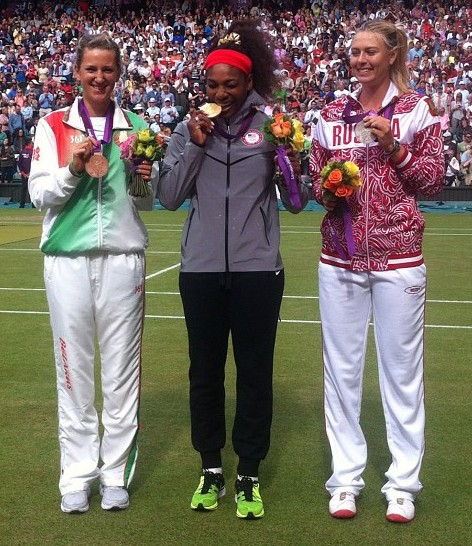
Maria Sharapova (right) won the silver medal in women's tennis singles.

Athlete	Event	Round of 64	Round of 32	Round of 16	Quarterfinals	Semifinals	Final / BM	
Athlete	Event	Opposition Score	Opposition Score	Opposition Score	Opposition Score	Opposition Score	Opposition Score	Rank
Maria Kirilenko	Singles	Duque (COL); W 6–0, 1–1^{r}	Watson (GBR); W 6–3, 6–2	Görges (GER); W 7–6^{(7–5)}, 6–3	Kvitová (CZE); W 7–6^{(7–3)}, 6–3	Sharapova (RUS); L 2–6, 3–6	Azarenka (BLR); L 3–6, 4–6	4
Nadia Petrova	Singles	Zheng J (CHN); W 6–4, 7–6^{(9–7)}	Tatishvili (GEO); W 6–3, 6–7^{(5–7)}, 6–2	Azarenka (BLR); L 6–7^{(6–8)}, 4–6	did not advance			
Maria Sharapova	Singles	Pe'er (ISR); W 6–2, 6–0	Robson (GBR); W 7–6^{(7–5)}, 6–3	Lisicki (GER); W 6–7^{(8–10)}, 6–4, 6–3	Clijsters (BEL); W 6–2, 7–5	Kirilenko (RUS); W 6–2, 6–3	S. Williams (USA); L 0–6, 1–6	2nd place, silver medalist(s)
Vera Zvonareva	Singles	Arvidsson (SWE); W 7–6^{(7–3)}, 6–4	Schiavone (ITA); W 6–3, 6–3	S. Williams (USA); L 1–6, 0–6	Did not advance			
Maria Kirilenko; Nadia Petrova	Doubles	—N/a	Jans-Ignacik / Rosolska (POL); W 6–7^{(5–7)}, 6–3, 6–2	Shvedova / Voskoboeva (KAZ); W 6–3, 6–2	Peng S / Zheng (CHN); W 7–5, 6–7^{(4–7)}, 6–4	S. Williams / V. Williams (USA); L 5–7, 4–6	Huber / Raymond (USA); W 4–6, 6–4, 6–1	3rd place, bronze medalist(s)
Elena Vesnina; Ekaterina Makarova	Doubles	—N/a	Gajdošová / Rodionova (AUS); W 6–1, 6–4	Görges / Grönefeld (GER); W 6–2, 6–1	Huber / Raymond (USA); L 3–6, 3–6	did not advance		

Mixed

Athlete	Event	Round of 16	Quarterfinals	Semifinals	Final / BM	
Athlete	Event	Opposition Score	Opposition Score	Opposition Score	Opposition Score	Rank
Elena Vesnina; Mikhail Youzhny	Doubles	Dulko / del Potro (ARG); L 3–6, 5–7	did not advance			

== Triathlon ==
Athlete	Event	Swim (1.5 km)	Trans 1	Bike (40 km)	Trans 2	Run (10 km)	Total Time	Rank
Alexander Bryukhankov	Men's	17:22	0:40	58:51	0:32	30:10	1:47:35	7
Dmitry Polyanski	Men's	17:14	0:38	1:00:35	0:29	30:28	1:49:24	21
Ivan Vasiliev	Men's	17:03	0:46	59:04	0:28	31:22	1:47:35	13
Irina Abysova	Women's	19:20	0:46	1:05:34	0:31	35:41	2:01:52	13
Alexandra Razarenova	Women's	19:47	0:51	1:10:36	0:30	37:27	2:09:11	47

== Volleyball ==
Russia qualified a men's team and a women's team for the indoor tournaments.

- Men's team event – 1 team of 12 players
- Women's team event – 1 team of 12 players

=== Beach ===
Athlete	Event	Preliminary round	Standing	Round of 16	Quarterfinals	Semifinals	Final / BM	
Athlete	Event	Opposition Score	Standing	Opposition Score	Opposition Score	Opposition Score	Opposition Score	Rank
Sergey Prokopyev; Konstantin Semenov	Men's	Pool C Brink – Reckermann (GER); L 0 – 2 (19–21, 17–21); Chevallier – Heyer (SUI); L 1 – 2 (26–28, 21–18, 13–15); Wu – Xu (CHN); W 2 – 1 (29–27, 17–21, 15–12)	3 Q	Gibb – Rosenthal (USA); L 0 – 2 (14–21, 20–22)	did not advance			9
Ekaterina Khomyakova; Evgenia Ukolova	Women's	Pool F Cicolari – Menegatti (ITA); L 1 – 2 (21–17, 18–21, 8–15); Lessard – Martin (CAN); W 2 – 1 (21–18, 28–30, 15–13); Dampney – Mullin (GBR); W 2 – 0 (25–23, 21–13)	2 Q	Xue – Zhang (CHN); L 0 – 2 (12–21, 11–21)	did not advance			9
Anastasia Vasina; Anna Vozakova	Women's	Pool B Xue – Zhang (CHN); W 2 – 1 (18–21, 21–14, 16–14); Arvaniti – Tsiartsiani (GRE); L 1 – 2 (21–18, 13–21, 12–15); Kuhn – Zumkehr (SUI); W 2 – 1 (21–17, 19–21, 15–9)	1 Q	D Schwaiger – S Schwaiger (AUT); L 1 – 2 (17–21, 21–16, 9–15)	did not advance			9

=== Men's indoor tournament ===
Team roster

The following is the Russian roster in the men's volleyball tournament of the 2012 Summer Olympics.

Head coach: Vladimir Alekno

№	Name	Date of birth	Height	Weight	Spike	Block	2012 club
3	Nikolay Apalikov	26 August 1982	2.03 m (6 ft 8 in)	105 kg (231 lb)	353 cm (139 in)	344 cm (135 in)	(Russia) ZENIT Kazan
4	Taras Khtey (c)	22 May 1982	2.05 m (6 ft 9 in)	109 kg (240 lb)	351 cm (138 in)	339 cm (133 in)	(Russia) Belogorie Belogorod
5	Sergey Grankin	21 January 1985	1.95 m (6 ft 5 in)	96 kg (212 lb)	351 cm (138 in)	320 cm (130 in)	(Russia) Dinamo Moscow
8	Sergey Tetyukhin	23 September 1975	1.97 m (6 ft 6 in)	89 kg (196 lb)	345 cm (136 in)	338 cm (133 in)	(Russia) Belogorie Belogorod
9	Aleksandr Sokolov	1 March 1982	1.93 m (6 ft 4 in)	97 kg (214 lb)	315 cm (124 in)	310 cm (120 in)	(Russia) Fakel
10	Yury Berezhko	27 January 1984	1.98 m (6 ft 6 in)	97 kg (214 lb)	346 cm (136 in)	338 cm (133 in)	(Russia) ZENIT Kazan
12	Aleksandr Butko	18 March 1986	1.98 m (6 ft 6 in)	97 kg (214 lb)	339 cm (133 in)	327 cm (129 in)	(Russia) Lokomotiv Novosibirsk
13	Dmitriy Muserskiy	29 October 1988	2.18 m (7 ft 2 in)	104 kg (229 lb)	375 cm (148 in)	347 cm (137 in)	(Russia) Belogorie Belogorod
15	Dmitriy Ilinikh	31 January 1987	2.01 m (6 ft 7 in)	92 kg (203 lb)	338 cm (133 in)	330 cm (130 in)	(Russia) Belogorie Belogorod
17	Maxim Mikhaylov	19 March 1988	2.03 m (6 ft 8 in)	105 kg (231 lb)	345 cm (136 in)	330 cm (130 in)	(Russia) ZENIT Kazan
18	Aleksandr Volkov	14 February 1985	2.10 m (6 ft 11 in)	90 kg (200 lb)	360 cm (140 in)	335 cm (132 in)	(Russia) ZENIT Kazan
20	Aleksey Obmochaev (L)	22 May 1989	1.89 m (6 ft 2 in)	84 kg (185 lb)	325 cm (128 in)	310 cm (120 in)	(Russia) ZENIT Kazan

Group play

Pos	Team	Pld	W	L	Pts	SW	SL	SR	SPW	SPL	SPR
1	United States	5	4	1	13	14	4	3.500	427	370	1.154
2	Brazil	5	4	1	11	13	5	2.600	418	379	1.103
3	Russia	5	4	1	11	12	5	2.400	408	352	1.159
4	Germany	5	2	3	5	6	11	0.545	379	388	0.977
5	Serbia	5	1	4	5	7	13	0.538	413	455	0.908
6	Tunisia	5	0	5	0	1	15	0.067	294	395	0.744

29 July 2012; 11:30	Russia	3–0	Germany	Earls Court Exhibition Centre, London; Attendance: 12,500; Referees: Simone Santi (ITA), Frans Loderus (NED)
29 July 2012; 11:30	(31–29, 25–18, 25–17); Results Statistics			Earls Court Exhibition Centre, London; Attendance: 12,500; Referees: Simone Santi (ITA), Frans Loderus (NED)

31 July 2012; 22:00	Brazil	3–0	Russia	Earls Court Exhibition Centre, London; Attendance: 14,800; Referees: Bela Hobor (HUN), Wang Ning (CHN)
31 July 2012; 22:00	(25–21, 25–23, 25–21); Results Statistics			Earls Court Exhibition Centre, London; Attendance: 14,800; Referees: Bela Hobor (HUN), Wang Ning (CHN)

2 August 2012; 14:45	Russia	3–0	Tunisia	Earls Court Exhibition Centre, London; Attendance: 13,000; Referees: Akihiko Tano (JPN), Mitchell Davidson (CAN)
2 August 2012; 14:45	(25–21, 25–15, 25–23); Results Statistics			Earls Court Exhibition Centre, London; Attendance: 13,000; Referees: Akihiko Tano (JPN), Mitchell Davidson (CAN)

4 August 2012; 17:10	Russia	3–2	United States	Earls Court Exhibition Centre, London; Attendance: 13,650; Referees: Bela Hobor (HUN), Rolando Cholakian (ARG)
4 August 2012; 17:10	(27–29, 19–25, 26–24, 25–16, 15–8); Results Statistics			Earls Court Exhibition Centre, London; Attendance: 13,650; Referees: Bela Hobor (HUN), Rolando Cholakian (ARG)

6 August 2012; 11:55	Russia	3–0	Serbia	Earls Court Exhibition Centre, London; Attendance: 12,000; Referees: Rolando Cholakian (ARG), Susana Rodriguez (ESP)
6 August 2012; 11:55	(25–15, 25–20, 25–17); Results Statistics			Earls Court Exhibition Centre, London; Attendance: 12,000; Referees: Rolando Cholakian (ARG), Susana Rodriguez (ESP)

Quarterfinal

8 August 2012; 19:30	Poland	0–3	Russia	Earls Court Exhibition Centre, London; Attendance: 14,000; Referees: Frans Loderus (NED), Nasr Shaaban (EGY)
8 August 2012; 19:30	(17–25, 23–25, 21–25); Results Statistics			Earls Court Exhibition Centre, London; Attendance: 14,000; Referees: Frans Loderus (NED), Nasr Shaaban (EGY)

Semifinal

10 August 2012; 15:00	Bulgaria	1–3	Russia	Earls Court Exhibition Centre, London; Attendance: 13,500; Referees: Wang Ning (CHN), Denny Cespedes (DOM)
10 August 2012; 15:00	(21–25, 15–25, 25–23, 23–25); Results Statistics			Earls Court Exhibition Centre, London; Attendance: 13,500; Referees: Wang Ning (CHN), Denny Cespedes (DOM)

Final

12 August 2012; 13:00	Russia	3–2	Brazil	Earls Court Exhibition Centre, London; Attendance: 14,500; Referees: Bela Hobor (HUN), Akihiko Tano (JPN)
12 August 2012; 13:00	(19–25, 20–25, 29–27, 25–22, 15–9); Results Statistics			Earls Court Exhibition Centre, London; Attendance: 14,500; Referees: Bela Hobor (HUN), Akihiko Tano (JPN)

=== Women's indoor tournament ===
Team roster

The following is the Russian roster in the women's volleyball tournament of the 2012 Summer Olympics.

Head coach: Sergey Ovchinnikov

№	Name	Date of birth	Height	Weight	Spike	Block	2012 club
1	Maria Borisenko (c)	8 March 1986	1.90 m (6 ft 3 in)	80 kg (180 lb)	301 cm (119 in)	297 cm (117 in)	(Russia) Dynamo Kazan
3	Maria Perepelkina	9 March 1984	1.86 m (6 ft 1 in)	72 kg (159 lb)	304 cm (120 in)	300 cm (120 in)	(Russia) Dynamo Moscow
4	Evgenia Estes	17 July 1975	1.91 m (6 ft 3 in)	75 kg (165 lb)	315 cm (124 in)	306 cm (120 in)	(Russia) Uralochka-NTMK
5	Lioubov Sokolova	4 December 1977	1.92 m (6 ft 4 in)	74 kg (163 lb)	310 cm (120 in)	304 cm (120 in)	(Turkey) Fenerbahçe
6	Anna Matienko	12 July 1981	1.82 m (6 ft 0 in)	68 kg (150 lb)	298 cm (117 in)	292 cm (115 in)	(Russia) Dynamo Moscow
7	Svetlana Kryuchkova (L)	21 February 1985	1.74 m (5 ft 9 in)	63 kg (139 lb)	290 cm (110 in)	286 cm (113 in)	(Russia) Dynamo Moscow
8	Nataliya Obmochaeva	1 June 1989	1.95 m (6 ft 5 in)	75 kg (165 lb)	315 cm (124 in)	306 cm (120 in)	(Russia) Dynamo Moscow
11	Yekaterina Gamova	17 October 1980	2.04 m (6 ft 8 in)	80 kg (180 lb)	321 cm (126 in)	310 cm (120 in)	(Russia) Dynamo Kazan
13	Yevgeniya Startseva	12 February 1989	1.84 m (6 ft 0 in)	68 kg (150 lb)	294 cm (116 in)	290 cm (110 in)	(Russia) Dinamo Krasnodar
14	Ekaterina Ulanova	5 August 1986	1.72 m (5 ft 8 in)	61 kg (134 lb)	298 cm (117 in)	290 cm (110 in)	(Russia) Dynamo Kazan
15	Tatiana Kosheleva	23 December 1988	1.91 m (6 ft 3 in)	67 kg (148 lb)	315 cm (124 in)	305 cm (120 in)	(Russia) Dinamo Krasnodar
16	Yulia Merkulova	17 February 1984	2.02 m (6 ft 8 in)	75 kg (165 lb)	317 cm (125 in)	308 cm (121 in)	(Russia) Dynamo Moscow

Group play

Pos	Team	Pld	W	L	Pts	SW	SL	SR	SPW	SPL	SPR	Qualification
1	Russia	5	5	0	14	15	4	3.750	459	352	1.304	Quarter-finals
2	Italy	5	4	1	13	14	5	2.800	442	368	1.201	Quarter-finals
3	Japan	5	3	2	9	11	6	1.833	401	335	1.197	Quarter-finals
4	Dominican Republic	5	2	3	6	8	9	0.889	374	362	1.033	Quarter-finals
5	Great Britain	5	1	4	2	3	14	0.214	295	396	0.745	
6	Algeria	5	0	5	1	2	15	0.133	252	410	0.615	

28 July 2012; 14:45	Great Britain	0–3	Russia	Earls Court Exhibition Centre, London; Attendance: 15,000; Referees: Patricia Salvatore (USA), Rogério Espicalski (BRA)
28 July 2012; 14:45	(19–25, 10–25, 16–25) result statistics			Earls Court Exhibition Centre, London; Attendance: 15,000; Referees: Patricia Salvatore (USA), Rogério Espicalski (BRA)

30 July 2012; 14:45	Dominican Republic	1–3	Russia	Earls Court Exhibition Centre, London; Attendance: 14,800; Referees: Rogerio Espicalsky (BRA), Karin Zahorcova (CZE)
30 July 2012; 14:45	(23–25, 15–25, 26–24, 22–25) report statistics			Earls Court Exhibition Centre, London; Attendance: 14,800; Referees: Rogerio Espicalsky (BRA), Karin Zahorcova (CZE)

1 August 2012; 11:30	Algeria	0–3	Russia	Earls Court Exhibition Centre, London; Attendance: 9,000; Referees: Janpen Jirakakul (THA), Brian McDougall (GBR)
1 August 2012; 11:30	(7–25, 14–25, 15–25) result statistics			Earls Court Exhibition Centre, London; Attendance: 9,000; Referees: Janpen Jirakakul (THA), Brian McDougall (GBR)

3 August 2012; 11:30	Japan	1–3	Russia	Earls Court Exhibition Centre, London; Attendance: 10,000; Referees: Jose Mercado (PUR), Zorica Bjelić (SRB)
3 August 2012; 11:30	(25–27, 17–25, 25–20, 19–25) result statistics			Earls Court Exhibition Centre, London; Attendance: 10,000; Referees: Jose Mercado (PUR), Zorica Bjelić (SRB)

5 August 2012; 16:45	Italy	2–3	Russia	Earls Court Exhibition Centre, London; Attendance: 10,000; Referees: Zorica Bjelić (SRB), Wang Ning (CHN)
5 August 2012; 16:45	(28–26, 19–25, 25–22, 16–25, 11–15) result statistics			Earls Court Exhibition Centre, London; Attendance: 10,000; Referees: Zorica Bjelić (SRB), Wang Ning (CHN)

Quarterfinals

7 August 2012; 15:00	Russia	2–3	Brazil	Earls Court Exhibition Centre, London; Attendance: 11,500; Referees: Akihiko Tano (JPN), Ibrahim Al-Naama (QAT)
7 August 2012; 15:00	(26–24, 22–25, 25–19, 22–25, 19–21) result statistics			Earls Court Exhibition Centre, London; Attendance: 11,500; Referees: Akihiko Tano (JPN), Ibrahim Al-Naama (QAT)

== Water polo ==
- Women's team event – 1 team of 13 players

=== Women's tournament ===
Roster

The following is the Russian roster in the women's water polo tournament of the 2012 Summer Olympics.

№	Name	Pos.	Height	Weight	Date of birth	2012 club
1	Mariia Kovtunovskaia	GK	1.65 m (5 ft 5 in)	61 kg (134 lb)	19 December 1988	
2	Diana Antonova	D	1.68 m (5 ft 6 in)	50 kg (110 lb)	17 January 1993	
3	Alexandra Antonova	D	1.70 m (5 ft 7 in)	55 kg (121 lb)	22 December 1991	
4	Olga Belova	CB	1.67 m (5 ft 6 in)	50 kg (110 lb)	27 August 1993	
5	Evgeniya Ivanova	D	1.65 m (5 ft 5 in)	55 kg (121 lb)	26 July 1987	
6	Ekaterina Tankeeva	CF	1.68 m (5 ft 6 in)	65 kg (143 lb)	28 June 1989	
7	Ekaterina Lisunova	D	1.74 m (5 ft 9 in)	62 kg (137 lb)	6 October 1989	
8	Nadezhda Fedotova	D	1.70 m (5 ft 7 in)	65 kg (143 lb)	20 August 1988	
9	Ekaterina Prokofyeva	D	1.66 m (5 ft 5 in)	63 kg (139 lb)	13 March 1991	
10	Olga Beliaeva	CF	1.73 m (5 ft 8 in)	64 kg (141 lb)	18 March 1985	
11	Evgeniia Khokhriakova	CB	1.78 m (5 ft 10 in)	70 kg (154 lb)	26 August 1988	
12	Sofia Konukh	CF	1.73 m (5 ft 8 in)	61 kg (134 lb)	9 March 1980	
13	Anna Karnaukh	GK	1.70 m (5 ft 7 in)	55 kg (121 lb)	31 August 1993	

Head coach: Aleksandr Kabanov

Group play

Team	Pld	W	D	L	GF	GA	GD	Pts
Australia	3	3	0	0	37	19	+18	6
Russia	3	2	0	1	22	21	+1	4
Italy	3	1	0	2	22	22	0	2
Great Britain	3	0	0	3	14	33	−19	0

30 July 2012; 18:20	Report	Great Britain	6–7	Russia	Water Polo Arena, London; Referees: Marie Deslieres (CAN), Ni Shiwei (CHN)
30 July 2012; 18:20	Report	Score by quarters: 2–3, 3–2, 0–1, 1–1			Water Polo Arena, London; Referees: Marie Deslieres (CAN), Ni Shiwei (CHN)
30 July 2012; 18:20	Report	Winstanley-Smith 3	Goals	Beliaeva, Prokofyeva 2	Water Polo Arena, London; Referees: Marie Deslieres (CAN), Ni Shiwei (CHN)

1 August 2012; 15:30	Report	Italy	4–7	Russia	Water Polo Arena, London; Referees: Sergi Sanchez (ESP), German Moller (ARG)
1 August 2012; 15:30	Report	Score by quarters: 0–1, 1–1, 1–4, 2–1			Water Polo Arena, London; Referees: Sergi Sanchez (ESP), German Moller (ARG)
1 August 2012; 15:30	Report	Di Mario 2	Goals	Lisunova 3	Water Polo Arena, London; Referees: Sergi Sanchez (ESP), German Moller (ARG)

3 August 2012; 15:30	Report	Russia	8–11	Australia	Water Polo Arena, London; Referees: Dragan Stampalja (CRO), Marie Deslieres (CAN)
3 August 2012; 15:30	Report	Score by quarters: 4–6, 1–2, 1–0, 2–3			Water Polo Arena, London; Referees: Dragan Stampalja (CRO), Marie Deslieres (CAN)
3 August 2012; 15:30	Report	Lisunova 3	Goals	Gynther 2	Water Polo Arena, London; Referees: Dragan Stampalja (CRO), Marie Deslieres (CAN)

Quarterfinals

5 August 2012; 14:50	Report	Hungary	11–10	Russia	Water Polo Arena, London; Referees: Massimiliano Caputi (ITA), Marijo Mrguljan (MNE)
5 August 2012; 14:50	Report	Score by quarters: 3–3, 4–2, 1–3, 3–2			Water Polo Arena, London; Referees: Massimiliano Caputi (ITA), Marijo Mrguljan (MNE)
5 August 2012; 14:50	Report	four players 2	Goals	Ivanova 4	Water Polo Arena, London; Referees: Massimiliano Caputi (ITA), Marijo Mrguljan (MNE)

5–8th place semifinals

7 August 2012; 18:20	Report	Russia	11–9	Great Britain	Water Polo Arena, London; Referees: Denis Danelon (BRA), German Moller (ARG)
7 August 2012; 18:20	Report	Score by quarters: 3–3, 1–2, 4–2, 3–2			Water Polo Arena, London; Referees: Denis Danelon (BRA), German Moller (ARG)
7 August 2012; 18:20	Report	Prokofyeva 4	Goals	Wilcox, Painter-Snell 3	Water Polo Arena, London; Referees: Denis Danelon (BRA), German Moller (ARG)

Fifth place game

9 August 2012; 15:50	Report	China	16–15 (OT)	Russia	Water Polo Arena, London; Referees: Brian Littlejohn (GBR), Steven Rotsart (USA)
9 August 2012; 15:50	Report	Score by quarters: 3–3, 5–6, 3–2, 3–3 OT: 1–0, 1–1			Water Polo Arena, London; Referees: Brian Littlejohn (GBR), Steven Rotsart (USA)
9 August 2012; 15:50	Report	Ma Huanhuan 6	Goals	Fedotova, Antonova 4	Water Polo Arena, London; Referees: Brian Littlejohn (GBR), Steven Rotsart (USA)

== Weightlifting ==
Russia qualified 6 men and 4 women. Three of the medals that Russia initially won in weightlifting were stripped due to doping violations.

Men

Athlete	Event	Snatch		Clean & Jerk		Total	Rank
Athlete	Event	Result	Rank	Result	Rank	Total	Rank
Apti Aukhadov	−85 kg	~~175~~	~~2~~	~~210~~	~~2~~	~~385~~	DSQ
Aleksandr Ivanov	−94 kg	~~185~~	~~1~~	~~224~~	~~4~~	~~409~~	DSQ
Andrey Demanov	−94 kg	~~182~~	~~5~~	~~225~~	~~3~~	~~407~~	DSQ
Khadzhimurat Akkaev	−105 kg	Withdrew					
Dmitry Klokov	−105 kg	Withdrew					
Ruslan Albegov	+105 kg	208	1	240	4	448	DSQ

Women

Athlete	Event	Snatch		Clean & Jerk		Total	Rank
Athlete	Event	Result	Rank	Result	Rank	Total	Rank
Svetlana Tsarukaeva	−63 kg	~~112~~	~~1~~	~~125~~	~~4~~	~~237~~	DSQ
Nadezhda Evstyukhina	−75 kg	~~125~~	DNF	—	—	—	DNF
Natalya Zabolotnaya	−75 kg	~~131 OR~~	~~1~~	~~160~~	~~2~~	~~291 OR~~	DSQ
Tatiana Kashirina	+75 kg	151 WR	1	181	2	332	2nd place, silver medalist(s)

== Wrestling ==
Key:

- VT – Victory by Fall.
- PP – Decision by Points – the loser with technical points.
- PO – Decision by Points – the loser without technical points.

Men's freestyle

Athlete	Event	Qualification	Round of 16	Quarterfinal	Semifinal	Repechage 1	Repechage 2	Final / BM	
Athlete	Event	Opposition Result	Opposition Result	Opposition Result	Opposition Result	Opposition Result	Opposition Result	Opposition Result	Rank
Dzhamal Otarsultanov	−55 kg	Bye	Shilimela (NAM); W 3–0 ^{PO}	Yang K-I (PRK); W 3–1 ^{PP}	Niyazbekov (KAZ); W 3–1 ^{PP}	Bye		Khinchegashvili (GEO); W 3–1 ^{PP}	1st place, gold medalist(s)
Besik Kudukhov	−60 kg	Gómez (PUR); W 3–1 ^{PP}	Dutt (IND); W 3–0 ^{PO}	Esmaeilpour (IRI); W 3–1 ^{PP}	Ri J-M (PRK); W 3–0 ^{PO}	Bye		Asgarov (AZE); L 1–3 ^{PP}	2nd place, silver medalist(s)
Alan Gogaev	−66 kg	Yusupov (TJK); L 0–3 ^{PO}	did not advance						16
Denis Tsargush	−74 kg	Bye	Aliyev (AZE); W 3–1 ^{PP}	Khutsishvili (GEO); W 3–0 ^{PO}	Burroughs (USA); L 1–3 ^{PP}	Bye		Gentry (CAN); W 3–0 ^{PO}	3rd place, bronze medalist(s)
Anzor Urishev	−84 kg	Bye	Aldatov (UKR); W 3–1 ^{PP}	Lashgari (IRI); L 1–3 ^{PP}	did not advance				8
Abdusalam Gadisov	−96 kg	Tigiyev (KAZ); W 3–1 ^{PP}	Yazdani (IRI); L 1–3 ^{PP}	did not advance					9
Bilyal Makhov	−120 kg	Magomedov (AZE); W 3–0 ^{PO}	Akgül (TUR); W 3–0 ^{PO}	Jargalsaikhany (MGL); W 3–1 ^{PP}	Modzmanashvili (GEO); L 1–3 ^{PP}	Bye		Shabanbay (KAZ); W 3–1 ^{PP}	1st place, gold medalist(s)

Men's Greco-Roman

Athlete	Event	Qualification	Round of 16	Quarterfinal	Semifinal	Repechage 1	Repechage 2	Final / BM	
Athlete	Event	Opposition Result	Opposition Result	Opposition Result	Opposition Result	Opposition Result	Opposition Result	Opposition Result	Rank
Mingiyan Semenov	−55 kg	Bayramov (AZE); L 0–3 ^{PO}	did not advance			Mango (USA); W 3–0 ^{PO}	Li Sj (CHN); W 3–0 ^{PO}	Choi G-J (KOR); W 3–1 ^{PP}	3rd place, bronze medalist(s)
Zaur Kuramagomedov	−60 kg	Bye	Benaissa (ALG); W 3–0 ^{PO}	Lashkhi (GEO); L 0–3 ^{PO}	Did not advance	Bye	Abdelmoneim (EGY); W 3–1 ^{PP}	Aliyev (AZE); W 3–0 ^{PO}	3rd place, bronze medalist(s)
Roman Vlasov	−74 kg	Bye	Madsen (DEN); W 3–1 ^{PP}	Guénot (FRA); W 3–1 ^{PP}	Kazakevič (LTU); W 3–0 ^{PO}	Bye		Julfalakyan (ARM); W 3–0 ^{PO}	1st place, gold medalist(s)
Alan Khugaev	−84 kg	Bye	Selimau (BLR); W 3–0 ^{PO}	Gadzhiyev (KAZ); W 3–0 ^{PO}	Gegeshidze (GEO); W 3–1 ^{PP}	Bye		Gaber (EGY); W 3–0 ^{PO}	1st place, gold medalist(s)
Rustam Totrov	−96 kg	Bye	Gadabadze (AZE); W 3–1 ^{PP}	Lidberg (SWE); W 3–0 ^{PO}	Dzeinichenka (BLR); W 3–0 ^{PO}	Bye		Rezaei (IRI); L 0–3 ^{PO}	2nd place, silver medalist(s)
Khasan Baroev	−120 kg	Patrikeyev (ARM); L 1–3 ^{PP}	did not advance						14

Women's freestyle

Athlete	Event	Qualification	Round of 16	Quarterfinal	Semifinal	Repechage 1	Repechage 2	Final / BM	
Athlete	Event	Opposition Result	Opposition Result	Opposition Result	Opposition Result	Opposition Result	Opposition Result	Opposition Result	Rank
Valeria Zholobova	−55 kg	Andrades (VEN); W 3–0 ^{PO}	Silva (BRA); W 3–1 ^{PP}	Mattsson (SWE); W 3–1 ^{PP}	Yoshida (JPN); L 0–3 ^{PO}	Bye		Ratkevich (AZE); L 1–3 ^{PP}	5
Lubov Volosova	−63 kg	Dunn (GUM); W 5–0 ^{VT}	Dugrenier (CUB); W 3–1 ^{PP}	Ostapchuk (UKR); W 3–1 ^{PP}	Jing Rx (CHN); L 1–3 ^{PP}	Bye		Michalik (POL); W 3–1 ^{PP}	3rd place, bronze medalist(s)
Natalia Vorobieva	−72 kg	Bye	Burmistrova (UKR); W 3–0 ^{PO}	Manyurova (KAZ); W 5–0 ^{VT}	Wang J (CHN); W 5–0 ^{VT}	Bye		Zlateva (BUL); W 5–0 ^{VT}	1st place, gold medalist(s)

== Russian doping scandal ==
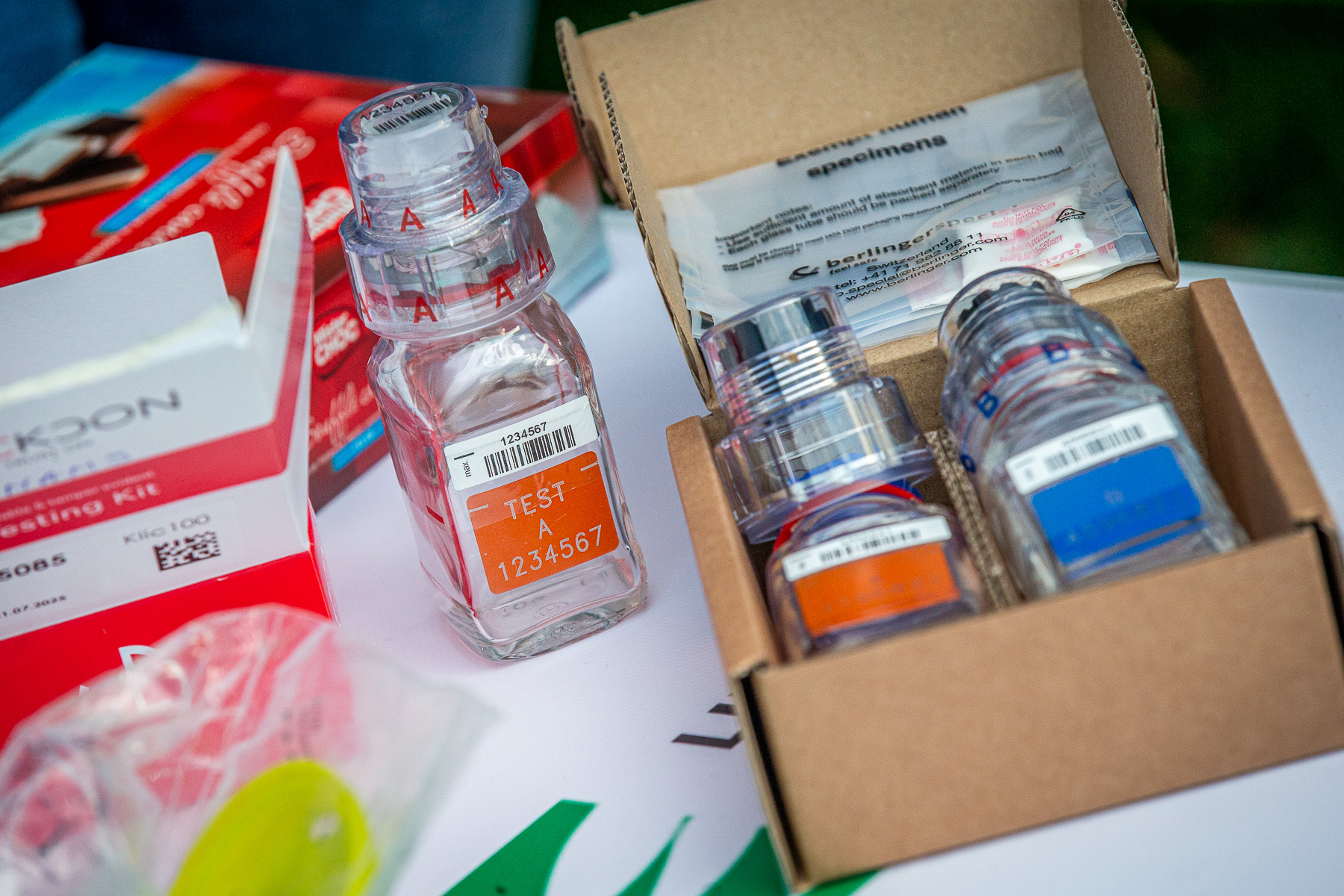
Urine doping sampling security bottles

Media attention began growing in December 2014 when German broadcaster ARD reported on state-sponsored doping in Russia, comparing it to doping in East Germany. In November 2015, the World Anti-Doping Agency (WADA) published a report, and the International Association of Athletics Federations (IAAF) suspended Russia indefinitely from world track and field events. The 335-page report, compiled following a nearly year-long investigation by a commission led by former anti-doping agency President Dick Pound, urged the IAAF to suspend Russia from competition, including the 2016 Summer Olympics. The report said Russia "sabotaged" the 2012 Olympics by allowing athletes who should have been banned for doping violations to compete in the London Games. It recommended the anti-doping agency impose lifetime suspensions for 10 Russian coaches and athletes, including women's 800-meters gold medalist Mariya Savinova. The United Kingdom Anti-Doping agency later assisted WADA with testing in Russia. In June 2016, they reported that they were unable to fully carry out their work and noted intimidation by armed Federal Security Service (FSB) agents. After a Russian former lab director made allegations about the 2014 Winter Olympics in Sochi, WADA commissioned an independent investigation led by Richard McLaren. McLaren's investigation found corroborating evidence, concluding in a report published in July 2016 that the Ministry of Sport and the FSB had operated a "state-directed failsafe system" using a "disappearing positive [test] methodology" (DPM) from "at least late 2011 to August 2015".
