= Volnov =

Volnov (Russian: Вольнов, from воля meaning will) is a Russian masculine surname, its feminine counterpart is Volnova. It may refer to

- Gennadi Volnov (1939–2008), Russian basketball player
- Marina Volnova (born 1989), Kazakhstani boxer
