= Boxing at the 2012 Summer Olympics – Women's middleweight =

Boxing competitions

Women's middleweight boxing at the Games of the XXX Olympiad
- Venue: ExCeL Exhibition Centre
- Date: 5 to 9 August 2012
- Competitors: 12 from 12 nations

Medalists
1st place, gold medalist(s)		Claressa Shields	United States
2nd place, silver medalist(s)		Nadezda Torlopova	Russia
3rd place, bronze medalist(s)		Marina Volnova	Kazakhstan
3rd place, bronze medalist(s)		Li Jinzi	China

The women's middleweight boxing competition at the 2012 Olympic Games in London was held from 5 to 9 August at the ExCeL Exhibition Centre.

For the first time at an Olympic Games, the 10 men's boxing events were joined by three women's events: flyweight, lightweight and middleweight.

Seventeen-year-old American Claressa Shields won gold in the women's middleweight, defeating Russia's veteran thirty-three-year-old Nadezda Torlopova by a score of 19–12 in the final. Her victory is depicted in the 2024 film The Fire Inside.

== Competition format ==
The competition consisted of a single-elimination tournament. Bronze medals were awarded to both semi-final losers. Bouts were four rounds of two minutes each.

== Schedule ==
All times are British Summer Time (UTC+01:00)

Date	Time	Round
Sunday 5 August 2012	15:30	Round of 16
Monday 6 August 2012	15:30	Quarter-finals
Wednesday 8 August 2012	14:30	Semi-finals
Thursday 9 August 2012	17:15	Final

== Results ==
Round of 16
Marina Volnova (KAZ)	20
Elizabeth Andiego (KEN)	11
Anna Laurell (SWE)	24
Naomi Fischer-Rasmussen (AUS)	17
Roseli Feitosa (BRA)	14
Li Jinzi (CHN)	19
Elena Vystropova (AZE)	12
Edith Ogoke (NGR)	14

Quarter-finals
Savannah Marshall (GBR)	12
Marina Volnova (KAZ)	16
Anna Laurell (SWE)	14
Claressa Shields (USA)	18
Mary Spencer (CAN)	14
Li Jinzi (CHN)	17
Edith Ogoke (NGR)	8
Nadezda Torlopova (RUS)	18

Semi-finals
Marina Volnova (KAZ)	15
Claressa Shields (USA)	29
Li Jinzi (CHN)	10
Nadezda Torlopova (RUS)	12

Final
Claressa Shields (USA)	19
Nadezda Torlopova (RUS)	12
