= Marina Volnova =

Kazakhstani boxer (born 1989)

Personal information
- Nationality: Kazakhstani
- Born: 26 July 1989 (age 37) Kzyl-Orda, Kazakh SSR, Soviet Union
- Height: 1.7 m (5 ft 7 in)
- Weight: Middleweight (75kg)

Boxing career
Medal record
Women's amateur boxing
Representing Kazakhstan
Olympic Games
Bronze medal – third place	2012 London	Middleweight
World Championships
Silver medal – second place	2010 Bridgetown	Light heavyweight
Asian Championships
Gold medal – first place	2010 Astana	Heavyweight
Bronze medal – third place	2021 Dubai	Middleweight

Marina Ivanovna Volnova (Russian: Мари́на Ива́новна Вольно́ва; born 26 July 1989 in Kzyl-Orda, Kazakh SSR, Soviet Union) is a Kazakhstani female amateur boxer. She won the bronze medal in the Women's boxing middleweight 75 kg category in the 2012 Summer Olympics.
