= Nadezhda Torlopova =

Russian boxer (born 1978)

Personal information
- Born: November 23, 1978 (age 47)
- Height: 1.75 m (5 ft 9 in)
- Weight: 75 kg (165 lb)

Sport
- Country: Russia
- Sport: Boxing
Medal record
Women's amateur boxing
Representing Russia
Olympic Games
Silver medal – second place	2012 London	Middleweight
World Championships
Gold medal – first place	2010 Barbados	Heavyweight
Bronze medal – third place	2012 Qinhuangdao	Middleweight
European Championships
Gold medal – first place	2009 Mykolaiv	Heavyweight
Gold medal – first place	2011 Rotterdam	Middleweight

Nadezhda Viktorovna Torlopova (Russian: Надежда Викторовна Торлопова, born 23 November 1978) is a Russian boxer. She is the 2010 AIBA World Champion.

== Career ==
Torlopova competed in women's middleweight boxing at the 2012 Summer Olympics in London, United Kingdom, winning the silver medal, after losing to American boxer Claressa Shields 12–19 in the gold medal bout. She retired soon afterwards.

== Awards ==
- Medal of the Order "For Merit to the Fatherland", I degree (August 13, 2022)
- Order of "Labor.Valor.Honour", certificate for a three-room apartment (2012)

== Personal life ==
Torlopova is married to her husband Vladimir and has one son and two daughters.
