= Evgeniy Pechenin =

Russian racing cyclist (born 1984)

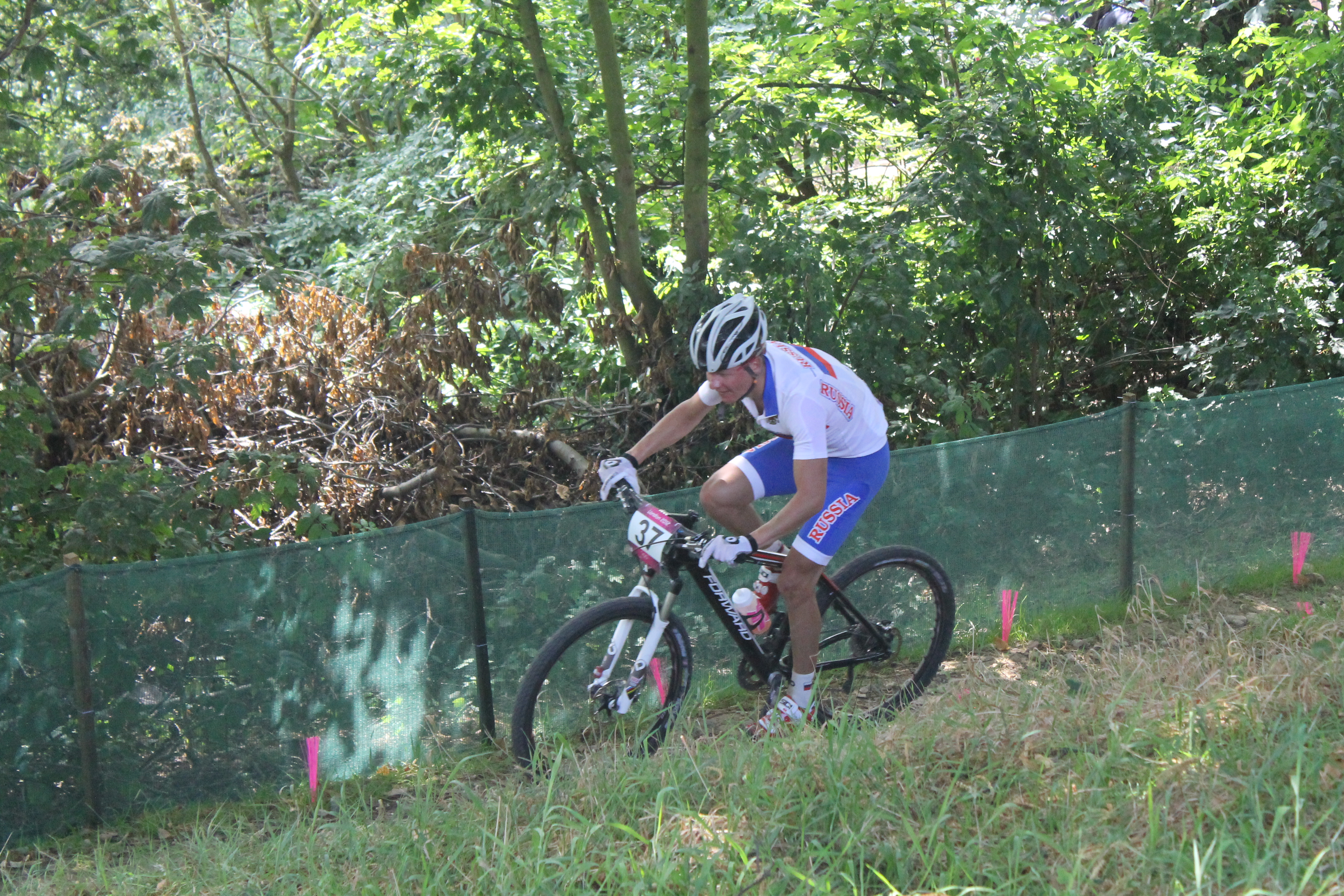
Pechenin at the 2012 Summer Olympics

Yevgeny Yuryevich Pechenin (Russian: Евгений Юрьевич Печенин; born 14 April 1984) is a Russian cross-country mountain biker. A native of Perm, Russia at the 2012 Summer Olympics, he competed in the Men's cross-country at Hadleigh Farm, finishing in 37th place.
