= 2011 World Wrestling Championships – Men's Greco-Roman 66 kg =

Men's Greco-Roman 66 kg at the 2011 World Championships
- Venue: Sinan Erdem Dome
- Dates: 12 September 2011
- Competitors: 52 from 52 nations

Medalists
gold medal	Saeid Abdevali	Iran
silver medal	Manuchar Tskhadaia	Georgia
bronze medal	Kim Hyeon-woo	South Korea
bronze medal	Pedro Mulens	Cuba

The men's Greco-Roman 66 kilograms is a competition featured at the 2011 World Wrestling Championships, and was held at the Sinan Erdem Dome in Istanbul, Turkey on 12 September 2011.

== Results ==
=== Finals ===
Semifinals				Final
Saeid Abdevali (IRI)	1	0	2
Kim Hyeon-woo (KOR)	0	3	0	Saeid Abdevali (IRI)	1	2
Justin Lester (USA)	0	0		Manuchar Tskhadaia (GEO)	0	0
Manuchar Tskhadaia (GEO)	4	4

=== Top half ===
==== Section 1 ====
Round of 64

Round of 32
Frank Stäbler (GER)	4	1
Iván Duque (COL)	0	0
Saeid Abdevali (IRI)	1	1
Mateusz Wanke (POL)	0	0
Darkhan Bayakhmetov (KAZ)	1	3
Marius Thommesen (NOR)	0	0
Kim Nam-il (PRK)	0	1	0
Mikhail Siamionau (BLR)	1	1	1

Round of 16
Frank Stäbler (GER)	0	0
Saeid Abdevali (IRI)	1	1
Darkhan Bayakhmetov (KAZ)	2	1
Mikhail Siamionau (BLR)	0	0

Quarterfinals
Saeid Abdevali (IRI)	2	1
Darkhan Bayakhmetov (KAZ)	1	0

==== Section 2 ====
Round of 64
Vladimir Pogudin (UZB)	0	1
Plamen Petrov (BUL)	1	6
Şeref Tüfenk (TUR)	0	1	0
Kim Hyeon-woo (KOR)	2	0	1
Tsai Yu-chia (TPE)	0	0
Ýazgeldi Kadyrow (TKM)	1	2
Myroslav Dykun (GBR)	2	1	0
Edgaras Venckaitis (LTU)	1	3	1

Round of 32
Gievgkeni Pentorets (GRE)	2	0	0
Ulises Barragán (MEX)	0	2	1
Fredrik Bjerrehuus (DEN)	0	0
Vitaliy Rahimov (AZE)	1	1
Plamen Petrov (BUL)	0	0
Kim Hyeon-woo (KOR)	4	1
Ýazgeldi Kadyrow (TKM)	0	0
Edgaras Venckaitis (LTU)	2	1

Round of 16
Ulises Barragán (MEX)	0	0
Vitaliy Rahimov (AZE)	1	1
Kim Hyeon-woo (KOR)	1	1
Edgaras Venckaitis (LTU)	0	0

Quarterfinals
Vitaliy Rahimov (AZE)	0	0
Kim Hyeon-woo (KOR)	1	3

=== Bottom half ===
==== Section 3 ====
Round of 64
Sandeep Tulsi Yadav (IND)	0	0
Kanatbek Begaliev (KGZ)	2	1
Sharur Vardanyan (SWE)	2	1
Orlando Huacón (ECU)	0	0
Steeve Guénot (FRA)	1	1
Tero Välimäki (FIN)	0	0
Taha Yaseen (IRQ)	0	1
Arman Adikyan (ARM)	4	2
Richard Rigó (SVK)	0	0
Zheng Pan (CHN)	5	4
Ambako Vachadze (RUS)	1	0	0
Danijel Janečić (CRO)	0	4	1
Justin Lester (USA)	1	2
Aleksandar Maksimović (SRB)	0	1
Manuel Torres (VEN)	2	0	0
Angelo Mota (DOM)	0	2	2

Round of 32
Kanatbek Begaliev (KGZ)	6	3
Sharur Vardanyan (SWE)	0	0
Steeve Guénot (FRA)	0	1	2
Arman Adikyan (ARM)	1	0	0
Zheng Pan (CHN)	1	3
Danijel Janečić (CRO)	0	0
Justin Lester (USA)	4	4
Angelo Mota (DOM)	0	0

Round of 16
Kanatbek Begaliev (KGZ)	0	1	5
Steeve Guénot (FRA)	1	0	0
Zheng Pan (CHN)	0	2
Justin Lester (USA)	1	6

Quarterfinals
Kanatbek Begaliev (KGZ)	3	0	3
Justin Lester (USA)	1	2	4

==== Section 4 ====
Round of 64
Ismael Navarro (ESP)	0	0
Tamás Lőrincz (HUN)	3	1
Ion Panait (ROU)	3	1
Ahmad Kodirov (TJK)	0	0
Mohamed Serir (ALG)	3	0	0
Manuchar Tskhadaia (GEO)	1	3	6
Mustafa Al-Nakdali (SYR)	1	0	0
Pascal Strebel (SUI)	0	2	1
Pedro Mulens (CUB)	4	6
Tiziano Corriga (ITA)	0	0
Marco Nigsch (AUT)	3	0
Ion Luchiţă (MDA)	6	8
Armen Vardanyan (UKR)	0	1	0
Hugo Passos (POR)	1	0	1
Yuji Okamoto (JPN)	7	7
Caleb Scanlan (ASA)	0	0

Round of 32
Tamás Lőrincz (HUN)	1	1
Ion Panait (ROU)	0	0
Manuchar Tskhadaia (GEO)	3	1
Pascal Strebel (SUI)	0	0
Pedro Mulens (CUB)	1	1
Ion Luchiţă (MDA)	0	0
Hugo Passos (POR)	3	0
Yuji Okamoto (JPN)	3	7

Round of 16
Tamás Lőrincz (HUN)	0	2	0
Manuchar Tskhadaia (GEO)	1	1	2
Pedro Mulens (CUB)	1	2
Yuji Okamoto (JPN)	0	0

Quarterfinals
Manuchar Tskhadaia (GEO)	3	3
Pedro Mulens (CUB)	0	0

=== Repechage ===
Repechage round 1
Mohamed Serir (ALG)	0	1	0
Pascal Strebel (SUI)	2	0	1

Repechage round 2
Mateusz Wanke (POL)	0	0
Frank Stäbler (GER)	2	4
Pascal Strebel (SUI)	0	0
Tamás Lőrincz (HUN)	3	1

Repechage round 3
Frank Stäbler (GER)	1	1
Darkhan Bayakhmetov (KAZ)	0	0
Tamás Lőrincz (HUN)	1	0	0
Pedro Mulens (CUB)	0	1	2

Bronze medals
Frank Stäbler (GER)	0	0
Kim Hyeon-woo (KOR)	1	2
Pedro Mulens (CUB)	1	1
Justin Lester (USA)	0	0
