= 2010 World Wrestling Championships – Men's Greco-Roman 66 kg =

Men's Greco-Roman 66 kg at the 2010 World Championships
- Venue: Olympic Stadium
- Dates: 6 September 2010
- Competitors: 36 from 36 nations

Medalists
gold medal	Ambako Vachadze	Russia
silver medal	Armen Vardanyan	Ukraine
bronze medal	Vasıf Arzumanov	Turkey
bronze medal	Vitaliy Rahimov	Azerbaijan

The men's Greco-Roman 66 kilograms is a competition featured at the 2010 World Wrestling Championships, and was held at the Olympic Stadium in Moscow, Russia on 6 September.

== Results ==
Legend

- F — Won by fall

=== Finals ===
Semifinals				Final
Armen Vardanyan (UKR)	0	1	1
Vasıf Arzumanov (TUR)	1	0	0	Armen Vardanyan (UKR)	0	0
Tamás Lőrincz (HUN)	0	0		Ambako Vachadze (RUS)	1	2
Ambako Vachadze (RUS)	1	2

=== Top half ===
==== Section 1 ====
Round of 64

Round of 32
Steeve Guénot (FRA)	0	1	0
Armen Vardanyan (UKR)	1	0	1
Tudor Gaivan (MDA)	5	0	0
Aleksandar Maksimović (SRB)	1	1	2
Tero Välimäki (FIN)	0	1	1
Marius Thommesen (NOR)	1	0	0
Faruk Sahin (USA)	0	1	1
Tomasz Świerk (POL)	1	0	0

Round of 16
Armen Vardanyan (UKR)	0	1	1
Aleksandar Maksimović (SRB)	1	0	0
Tero Välimäki (FIN)	1	1	0
Faruk Sahin (USA)	0	3	1

Quarterfinals
Armen Vardanyan (UKR)	2	1
Faruk Sahin (USA)	0	0

==== Section 2 ====
Round of 64

Round of 32
Emiliyan Todorov (BUL)	0	1	2
Wang Hu (CHN)	1	0	0
Ion Panait (ROU)	5	1
Sharur Vardanyan (SWE)	0	0
Tsutomu Fujimura (JPN)	6	0	0
Vladimir Pogudin (UZB)	0	2	2
Kanatbek Begaliev (KGZ)	2	0	0
Vasıf Arzumanov (TUR)	0	2	1

Round of 16
Emiliyan Todorov (BUL)	4	3
Ion Panait (ROU)	0	1
Vladimir Pogudin (UZB)	0	0
Vasıf Arzumanov (TUR)	1	3

Quarterfinals
Emiliyan Todorov (BUL)	0	0
Vasıf Arzumanov (TUR)	1	6

=== Bottom half ===
==== Section 3 ====
Round of 64

Round of 32
Mohamed Serir (ALG)	0	0
Kim Hyeon-woo (KOR)	1	2
Kazbek Kilou (BLR)	1	3
Ýazgeldi Kadyrow (TKM)	0	0
Tamás Lőrincz (HUN)	8	8
Zairo Huberman (CHI)	0	0
Hugo Passos (POR)	0	0
Saeid Abdevali (IRI)	7	7

Round of 16
Kim Hyeon-woo (KOR)	2	1
Kazbek Kilou (BLR)	0	0
Tamás Lőrincz (HUN)	1	3
Saeid Abdevali (IRI)	0	0

Quarterfinals
Kim Hyeon-woo (KOR)	0	2
Tamás Lőrincz (HUN)	4	4

==== Section 4 ====
Round of 64
Joseph Lopez (GUM)	0
Pascal Strebel (SUI)	3^{F}
Ioannis Parotsidis (GRE)	0	1
Darkhan Bayakhmetov (KAZ)	6	9
Danijel Janečić (CRO)	6	1
Ismael Navarro (ESP)	0	0
Ambako Vachadze (RUS)	2	1
Christian Fetzer (GER)	0	0

Round of 32
Sunil Kumar Rana (IND)	0	1	0
Vitaliy Rahimov (AZE)	5	0	1
Arman Adikyan (ARM)	0	4	2
Manuchar Tskhadaia (GEO)	1	1	1
Pascal Strebel (SUI)	2	2
Darkhan Bayakhmetov (KAZ)	0	1
Danijel Janečić (CRO)	0	0
Ambako Vachadze (RUS)	4	1

Round of 16
Vitaliy Rahimov (AZE)	0	1	5
Arman Adikyan (ARM)	1	0	3
Pascal Strebel (SUI)	0	0
Ambako Vachadze (RUS)	1	3

Quarterfinals
Vitaliy Rahimov (AZE)	0	0
Ambako Vachadze (RUS)	1	2

=== Repechage ===
Repechage round 1
Christian Fetzer (GER)	3	0	1
Danijel Janečić (CRO)	1	3	7

Repechage round 2
Steeve Guénot (FRA)	4	1
Aleksandar Maksimović (SRB)	2	0
Danijel Janečić (CRO)	0	0
Pascal Strebel (SUI)	4	4

Repechage round 3
Steeve Guénot (FRA)	3	3
Faruk Sahin (USA)	0	0
Pascal Strebel (SUI)	0	0
Vitaliy Rahimov (AZE)	1	2

Bronze medals
Steeve Guénot (FRA)	0	0
Vasıf Arzumanov (TUR)	3	2
Vitaliy Rahimov (AZE)	1	1
Tamás Lőrincz (HUN)	0	0
