= 2009 World Wrestling Championships – Men's Greco-Roman 66 kg =

Men's Greco-Roman 66 kg at the 2009 World Championships
- Venue: Messecenter Herning
- Dates: 27 September 2009
- Competitors: 40 from 40 nations

Medalists
gold medal	Farid Mansurov	Azerbaijan
silver medal	Manuchar Tskhadaia	Georgia
bronze medal	Ambako Vachadze	Russia
bronze medal	Pedro Mulens	Cuba

The men's Greco-Roman 66 kilograms is a competition featured at the 2009 World Wrestling Championships; it was held at the Messecenter Herning exhibition center in Herning, Denmark on September 27.

== Results ==
Legend

- F — Won by fall
- R — Retired

=== Finals ===
Semifinals				Final
Ambako Vachadze (RUS)	0	0
Manuchar Tskhadaia (GEO)	2	3		Manuchar Tskhadaia (GEO)	0	0
Pedro Mulens (CUB)	2	0	0	Farid Mansurov (AZE)	1	1
Farid Mansurov (AZE)	0	1	1

=== Top half ===
==== Section 1 ====
Round of 64

Round of 32
Sunil Kumar Rana (IND)	0	3	0
Sharur Vardanyan (SWE)	6	0	1
Ambako Vachadze (RUS)	5	1
Matthias Kathan (AUT)	0	0
Pascal Strebel (SUI)	0	0
Markus Thätner (GER)	3	2
Faruk Sahin (USA)	2	1
Mikhail Siamionau (BLR)	0	0

Round of 16
Sharur Vardanyan (SWE)	0	0
Ambako Vachadze (RUS)	2	2
Markus Thätner (GER)	2	0	1
Faruk Sahin (USA)	0	2	0

Quarterfinals
Ambako Vachadze (RUS)	2	1
Markus Thätner (GER)	0	0

==== Section 2 ====
Round of 64

Round of 32
Manuchar Tskhadaia (GEO)	1	1
Tomáš Sobecký (CZE)	0	0
Tamás Lőrincz (HUN)	0	1	4
Aleksandar Maksimović (SRB)	2	0	0
Abdullah Coşkun (TUR)	0	0
Steeve Guénot (FRA)	1	1
Juha Hiltunen (FIN)	2	1
Marius Thommesen (NOR)	0	0

Round of 16
Manuchar Tskhadaia (GEO)	1	4
Tamás Lőrincz (HUN)	0	0
Steeve Guénot (FRA)	2	0	0
Juha Hiltunen (FIN)	0	2	1

Quarterfinals
Manuchar Tskhadaia (GEO)	2	5
Juha Hiltunen (FIN)	0	0

=== Bottom half ===
==== Section 3 ====
Round of 64

Round of 32
Ion Panait (ROU)	0	0
Darkhan Bayakhmetov (KAZ)	1	1
Frederik Ekström (DEN)	0	3	1
Tiziano Corriga (ITA)	1	0	0
Kim Kum-chol (PRK)	1	0	1
Gievgkeni Pentorets (GRE)	0	1	0
Angelo Mota (DOM)	0	0
Pedro Mulens (CUB)	1	2

Round of 16
Darkhan Bayakhmetov (KAZ)	3	6
Frederik Ekström (DEN)	0	0
Kim Kum-chol (PRK)	0	0
Pedro Mulens (CUB)	4	2

Quarterfinals
Darkhan Bayakhmetov (KAZ)	1	0	R
Pedro Mulens (CUB)	0	2

==== Section 4 ====
Round of 64
Sasun Ghambaryan (ARM)	2	1
Bashar Mohammed (IRQ)	0	0
Luis Liendo (VEN)	0	0
Vladimir Zaporojan (MDA)	1	1
Farid Mansurov (AZE)	3	2
Ismael Navarro (ESP)	0	0
Tsutomu Fujimura (JPN)	2	3	3
Sylwester Charzewski (POL)	3	0	0
Hugo Passos (POR)	0	1	0
Emil Milev (BUL)	1	0	1
Rovshan Odilov (UZB)	0	0
Lu Xingbo (CHN)	1	1
Suren Gevorkyan (UKR)	0	0
Afshin Biabangard (IRI)	1	3
Eom Hyeok (KOR)	0	0
Edgaras Venckaitis (LTU)	4	1

Round of 32
Sasun Ghambaryan (ARM)	5	3	5
Vladimir Zaporojan (MDA)	0	6	1
Farid Mansurov (AZE)	1	2
Tsutomu Fujimura (JPN)	0	0
Emil Milev (BUL)	3	8
Lu Xingbo (CHN)	0	0
Afshin Biabangard (IRI)	2	1
Edgaras Venckaitis (LTU)	0	0

Round of 16
Sasun Ghambaryan (ARM)	0	1
Farid Mansurov (AZE)	4	2
Emil Milev (BUL)	0	0
Afshin Biabangard (IRI)	1	1

Quarterfinals
Farid Mansurov (AZE)	3	0	1
Afshin Biabangard (IRI)	0	2	0

=== Repechage ===
Repechage round 1
Ismael Navarro (ESP)	0	0
Tsutomu Fujimura (JPN)	1	6

Repechage round 2
Tomáš Sobecký (CZE)	0	0
Tamás Lőrincz (HUN)	4	3^{F}
Tsutomu Fujimura (JPN)	0	1
Sasun Ghambaryan (ARM)	1	3

Repechage round 3
Tamás Lőrincz (HUN)	7	1
Juha Hiltunen (FIN)	0	0
Sasun Ghambaryan (ARM)	2	1
Afshin Biabangard (IRI)	0	0

Bronze medals
Tamás Lőrincz (HUN)	0	0
Ambako Vachadze (RUS)	2	2
Sasun Ghambaryan (ARM)	0	0
Pedro Mulens (CUB)	1	2
