= Lithuania at the 2012 Summer Olympics =

- IOC code: LTU
- NOC: Lithuanian National Olympic Committee
- Website: www.ltok.lt (in Lithuanian and English)

in London
- Competitors: 62 in 14 sports
- Flag bearers: Virgilijus Alekna (opening); Jevgenijus Šuklinas (closing)
- Medals Ranked 35th: Gold 2 Silver 0 Bronze 3 Total 5

Summer Olympics appearances (overview)
- 1924; 1928; 1932–1988; 1992; 1996; 2000; 2004; 2008; 2012; 2016; 2020; 2024

Other related appearances
- Russian Empire (1908–1912); Soviet Union (1952–1988)

Lithuania competed at the 2012 Summer Olympics in London, from 27 July to 12 August 2012. This was the nation's eighth appearance at the Summer Olympics. The National Olympic Committee of Lithuania (Lithuanian: Lietuvos tautinis olimpinis komitetas, LTOK) sent a total of 62 athletes to the Games, 39 men and 23 women, to compete in 14 sports. Men's basketball was the only team-based sport in which Lithuania had its representation in these Olympic games.

The Lithuanian team featured past Olympic medalists, including Laser Radial sailor and world champion Gintarė Scheidt, who previously won the silver in Beijing. Trap shooter Daina Gudzinevičiūtė, and discus thrower and two-time Olympic champion Virgilijus Alekna, who became Lithuania's flag bearer at the opening ceremony, made their fifth Olympic appearance as the oldest and most experienced team members. Basketball player Šarūnas Jasikevičius and heptathlete Austra Skujytė, on the other hand, were among the Lithuanian athletes to compete in four Olympic games. Other notable athletes featured swimmer and world bronze medalist Giedrius Titenis, and NBA basketball stars Linas Kleiza and Jonas Valančiūnas (both played for the Toronto Raptors).

Lithuania left London with a total of six Olympic medals (two gold, one silver, and three bronze). Four of these medals were awarded for the first time in boxing, canoeing and swimming, including all gold medals won by women. Among the nation's medalists were 15-year-old breaststroke swimmer Rūta Meilutytė, the youngest athlete of the team, who surprisingly won Lithuania's first ever gold medal in her sport, and Laura Asadauskaitė, who became the final Olympic champion in London, after winning the women's modern pentathlon. The men's national basketball team failed to advance into the semi-finals for the first time, after losing out to Russia.

== Medalists ==
Medal	Name	Sport	Event	Date
Gold	Rūta Meilutytė	Swimming	Women's 100 m breaststroke	30 July
Gold	Laura Asadauskaitė	Modern pentathlon	Women's event	12 August
Bronze	Aleksandr Kazakevič	Wrestling	Men's Greco-Roman 74 kg	5 August
Bronze	Evaldas Petrauskas	Boxing	Men's lightweight	10 August
Bronze	Austra Skujytė	Athletics	Women's heptathlon	4 August

Medals by sport
Sport	1st place, gold medalist(s)	2nd place, silver medalist(s)	3rd place, bronze medalist(s)	Total
Swimming	1	0	0	1
Modern pentathlon	1	0	0	1
Wrestling	0	0	1	1
Boxing	0	0	1	1
Athletics	0	0	1	1
Canoeing	0	0	0	0
Total	2	0	3	5

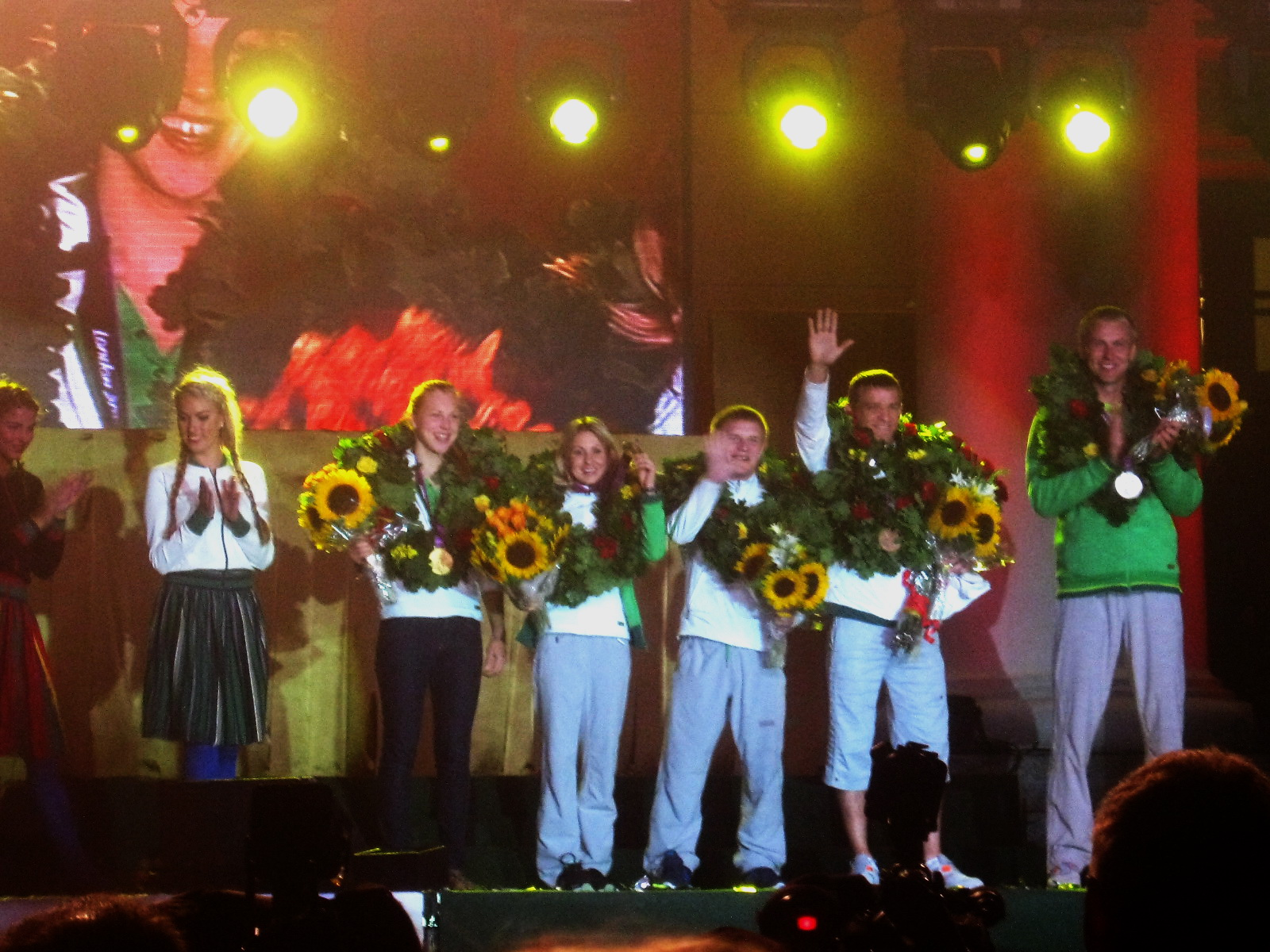
Medalists greeting in Vilnius

== Competitors ==
Sport	Men	Women	Total
Athletics	7	13	20
Badminton	0	1	1
Basketball	12	0	12
Boxing	2	0	2
Canoeing	2	0	2
Cycling	2	2	4
Gymnastics	1	1	2
Judo	2	0	2
Modern pentathlon	1	2	3
Rowing	3	1	4
Sailing	2	1	3
Shooting	0	1	1
Swimming	3	1	4
Wrestling	2	0	2
Total	39	23	62

== Athletics ==
Lithuanian athletes have so far achieved qualifying standards in the following athletics events (up to a maximum of 3 athletes in each event at the 'A' Standard, and 1 at the 'B' Standard):

Key

- Note–Ranks given for track events are within the athlete's heat only
- Q = Qualified for the next round
- q = Qualified for the next round as a fastest loser or, in field events, by position without achieving the qualifying target
- NR = National record
- N/A = Round not applicable for the event
- Bye = Athlete not required to compete in round

Men
Track & road events

Athlete	Event	Heat		Quarterfinal		Semifinal		Final	
Athlete	Event	Result	Rank	Result	Rank	Result	Rank	Result	Rank
Rytis Sakalauskas	100 m	Bye		10.29	6	Did not advance			
Tadas Šuškevičius	50 km walk	—N/a						4:08:16	46
Marius Žiūkas	20 km walk	—N/a						1:24:45	40

Field events

Athlete	Event	Qualification		Final	
Athlete	Event	Distance	Position	Distance	Position
Virgilijus Alekna	Discus throw	63.88	10 q	67.38	4
Povilas Mykolaitis	Long jump	7.61	26	Did not advance	
Raivydas Stanys	High jump	2.16	27	Did not advance	

Combined events – Decathlon

Athlete	Event	100 m	LJ	SP	HJ	400 m	110H	DT	PV	JT	1500 m	Final	Rank
Darius Draudvila	Result	10.95	7.12	15.17	1.96	50.13	14.87	46.43	4.20	50.16	5:03.14	7557	25
Darius Draudvila	Points	872	842	800	767	809	865	796	673	591	542	7557	25

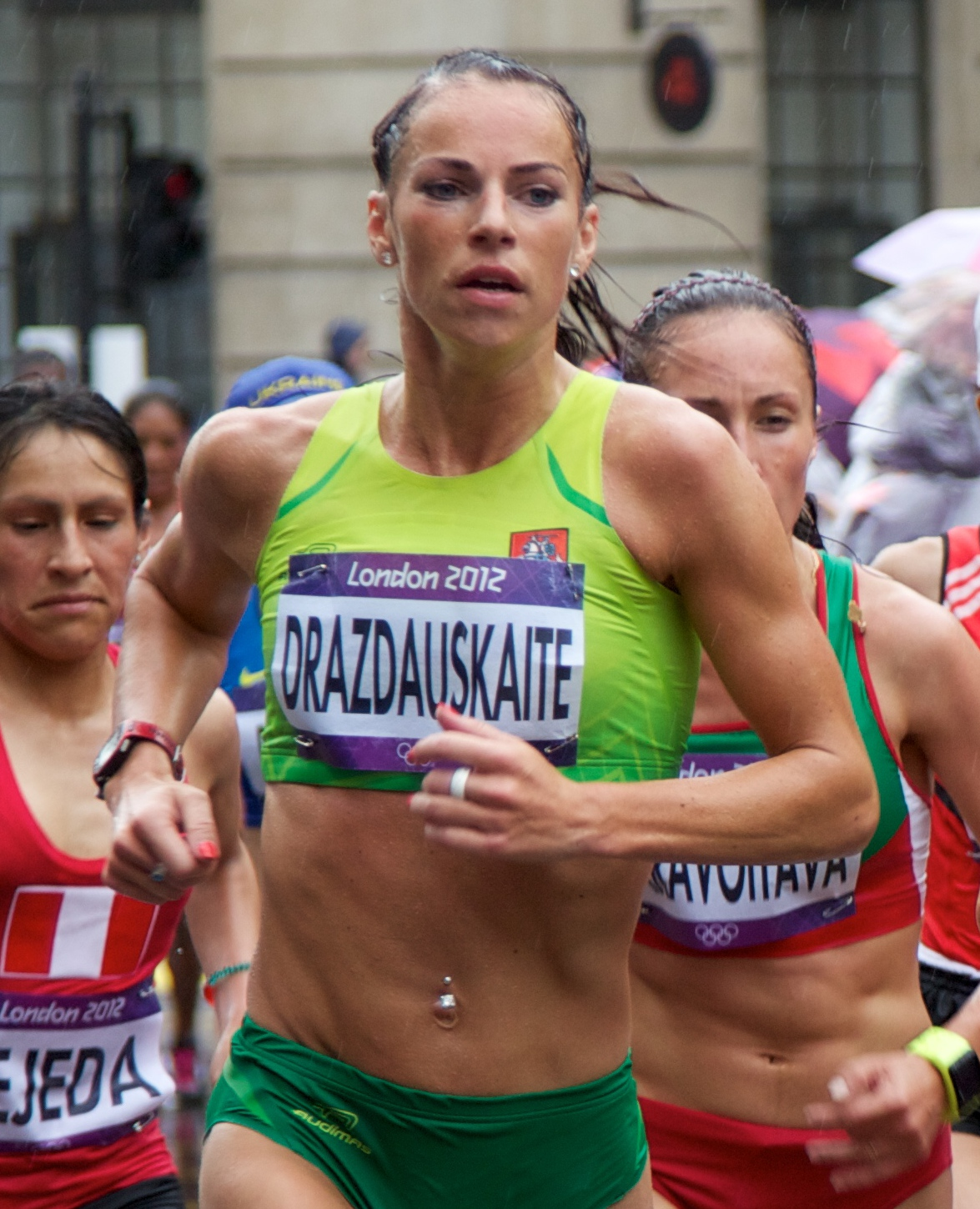
Rasa Drazdauskaitė in women's marathon

Women
Track & road events

Athlete	Event	Heat		Quarterfinal		Semifinal		Final	
Athlete	Event	Result	Rank	Result	Rank	Result	Rank	Result	Rank
Neringa Aidietytė	20 km walk	—N/a						1:34:01	39
Rasa Drazdauskaitė	Marathon	—N/a						2:29:29	27
Lina Grinčikaitė	100 m	Bye		11.19 NR	4 q	11.30	7	Did not advance	
Remalda Kergytė	Marathon	—N/a						2:39:01	75
Diana Lobačevskė	Marathon	—N/a						2:29:32	28
Kristina Saltanovič	20 km walk	—N/a						1:31:04	21
Eglė Staišiūnaitė	400 m hurdles	57.79	5	—N/a		Did not advance			
Sonata Tamošaitytė	100 m hurdles	13.59	5	—N/a		Did not advance			
Brigita Virbalytė	20 km walk	—N/a						1:31:58	26

Field events

Athlete	Event	Qualification		Final	
Athlete	Event	Distance	Position	Distance	Position
Indrė Jakubaitytė	Javelin throw	59.05	18	Did not advance	
Airinė Palšytė	High jump	1.93	=10 q	1.89	11
Zinaida Sendriūtė	Discus throw	62.79	10 q	61.68	8

Combined events – Heptathlon

Athlete	Event	100H	HJ	SP	200 m	LJ	JT	800 m	Final	Rank
Austra Skujytė	Result	14.00	1.92	17.31	25.43	6.25	51.13	2:20.59	6599	3rd place, bronze medalist(s)
Austra Skujytė	Points	978	1132	1016	848	927	882	816	6599	3rd place, bronze medalist(s)

== Badminton ==
Athlete	Event	Group stage			Elimination	Quarterfinal	Semifinal	Final / BM	
Athlete	Event	Opposition Score	Opposition Score	Rank	Opposition Score	Opposition Score	Opposition Score	Opposition Score	Rank
Akvilė Stapušaitytė	Women's singles	Jie Y (NED); L (16–21, 7–21)	Ingólfsdóttir (ISL); L (10–21, 16–21)	3	Did not advance				

== Basketball ==
=== Men's tournament ===
Roster

The following is the Lithuania roster in the men's basketball tournament of the 2012 Summer Olympics.

Lithuania men's national basketball team – 2012 Summer Olympics roster
Players
Coaches

Pos.	No.	Name	Age – Date of birth	Height	Club
G	4	Rimantas Kaukėnas	35 – 11 April 1977	1.94 m (6 ft 4 in)	Mens Sana Basket
G	5	Mantas Kalnietis	25 – 6 September 1986	1.96 m (6 ft 5 in)	BC Žalgiris
F	6	Jonas Mačiulis	27 – 10 February 1985	1.98 m (6 ft 6 in)	Mens Sana Basket
G	7	Martynas Pocius	26 – 28 April 1986	1.96 m (6 ft 5 in)	Real Madrid Baloncesto
G	8	Renaldas Seibutis	27 – 23 July 1985	1.98 m (6 ft 6 in)	BC Lietuvos rytas
F	9	Darius Songaila	34 – 14 February 1978	2.06 m (6 ft 9 in)	CB Valladolid
G	10	Simas Jasaitis	30 – 26 March 1982	2.01 m (6 ft 7 in)	Türk Telekom B.K.
F	11	Linas Kleiza (C)	27 – 3 January 1985	2.03 m (6 ft 8 in)	Toronto Raptors
C	12	Antanas Kavaliauskas	27 – 19 September 1984	2.09 m (6 ft 10 in)	BK VEF Rīga
G	13	Šarūnas Jasikevičius	36 – 5 March 1976	1.93 m (6 ft 4 in)	Panathinaikos B.C.
C	14	Jonas Valančiūnas	20 – 6 May 1992	2.11 m (6 ft 11 in)	BC Lietuvos rytas
F	15	Paulius Jankūnas	28 – 29 April 1984	2.06 m (6 ft 9 in)	BC Žalgiris

Head coach

- Kęstutis Kemzūra

Assistant coach(es)

- Valdemaras Chomičius
- Robertas Kuncaitis
- Donaldas Kairys

Team manager

- Antanas Guoga

Legend

- Club – describes last
  club before the tournament
- Age – describes age
  on 29 July 2012
- (C) – team captain

Group play

Pos	Team	Pld	W	L	PF	PA	PD	Pts	Qualification
1	United States	5	5	0	589	398	+191	10	Quarterfinals
2	France	5	4	1	376	378	−2	9	Quarterfinals
3	Argentina	5	3	2	448	424	+24	8	Quarterfinals
4	Lithuania	5	2	3	395	399	−4	7	Quarterfinals
5	Nigeria	5	1	4	338	456	−118	6	
6	Tunisia	5	0	5	320	411	−91	5	

Source: FIBA archive
Rules for classification: 1) points; 2) head-to-head points; 3) head-to-head goal average; 4) head-to-head number of points scored.

29 July 2012
22:15

Report

Argentina	102–79	Lithuania
Scoring by quarter: 24–23, 27–16, 27–22, 24–18
Pts: Scola 32; Rebs: Ginóbili 10; Asts: Ginóbili, Prigioni 6		Pts: Kleiza 20; Rebs: Kleiza 7 Asts: Kalnietis 5

Basketball Arena, London
Referees: Carl Jungebrand (FIN), Jorge Carrion (PUR), Vaughan Mayberry (AUS)

31 July 2012
14:30

Report

Lithuania	72–53	Nigeria
Scoring by quarter: 14–8, 20–19, 22–13, 16–13
Pts: Songaila 12; Rebs: Kleiza 6 Asts: Jasikevičius 9		Pts: Diogu, Al. Aminu 12; Rebs: Al. Aminu 11; Asts: Al. Aminu 2

Basketball Arena, London
Referees: Cristiano Maranho (BRA), Stephen Seibel (CAN), Vitalis Gode (KEN)

2 August 2012
09:00

Report

France	82–74	Lithuania
Scoring by quarter: 25–21, 14–22, 20–9, 23–22
Pts: Parker 27; Rebs: Turiaf 10; Asts: Diaw 8		Pts: Kleiza 17; Rebs: Kleiza 7 Asts: Jasikevičius 5

Basketball Arena, London
Referees: Christos Christodoulou (GRE), Ilija Belošević (SRB), Jorge Vázquez (PUR)

4 August 2012
14:30

Report

Lithuania	94–99	United States
Scoring by quarter: 25–33, 26–22, 21–23, 22–21
Pts: Kleiza 25; Rebs: Pocius 7 Asts: Jasikevičius, Pocius 6		Pts: James, Anthony 20; Rebs: Love 8 Asts: Paul 6

Basketball Arena, London
Referees: Recep Ankaralı (TUR), Luigi Lamonica (ITA), Marcos Benito (BRA)

6 August 2012
11:15

Report

Tunisia	63–76	Lithuania
Scoring by quarter: 18–7, 17–22, 19–21, 9–26
Pts: Rzig 17; Rebs: Mejri 12; Asts: Mejri 3		Pts: Songaila, Jasikevičius 13; Rebs: Kleiza, Valančiūnas 6 Asts: Kalnietis 9

Basketball Arena, London
Referees: Juan Arteaga (ESP), Saša Pukl (SLO), Felicia Grinter (USA)

Quarter-final

8 August 2012
14:00

Report

Russia	83–74	Lithuania
Scoring by quarter: 17–10, 15–17, 22–23, 29–24
Pts: Kirilenko 19; Rebs: Kirilenko 13; Asts: Khryapa 8		Pts: Kaukėnas 19; Rebs: Valančiūnas 9 Asts: four players 3

North Greenwich Arena, London
Referees: Carl Jungebrand (FIN), Pablo Estévez (ARG), Michael Aylen (AUS)

== Boxing ==
Men

Athlete	Event	Round of 32	Round of 16	Quarterfinals	Semifinals	Final	
Athlete	Event	Opposition Result	Opposition Result	Opposition Result	Opposition Result	Opposition Result	Rank
Evaldas Petrauskas	Lightweight	Varga (HUN); W 20–12	Keleş (TUR); W 16–12	Valentino (ITA); W 16–14	Han S-C (KOR); L 13–18	Did not advance	3rd place, bronze medalist(s)
Egidijus Kavaliauskas	Welterweight	Bye	Evans (GBR); L 7–11	Did not advance			

== Canoeing ==
=== Sprint ===
Lithuania has so far qualified boats for the following events:

Athlete	Event	Heats		Semifinals		Finals	
Athlete	Event	Time	Rank	Time	Rank	Time	Rank
Egidijus Balčiūnas	Men's K-1 200 m	36.173	4 Q	36.495	5 FB	37.995	10
Jevgenijus Šuklinas	Men's C-1 200 m	41.288	2 Q	41.483	1 FA	42.792	DSQ*

- On 12 June 2019, the IOC stripped Jevgenijus Šuklinas of his silver medal.

Qualification Legend: FA = Qualify to final (medal); FB = Qualify to final B (non-medal);

== Cycling ==
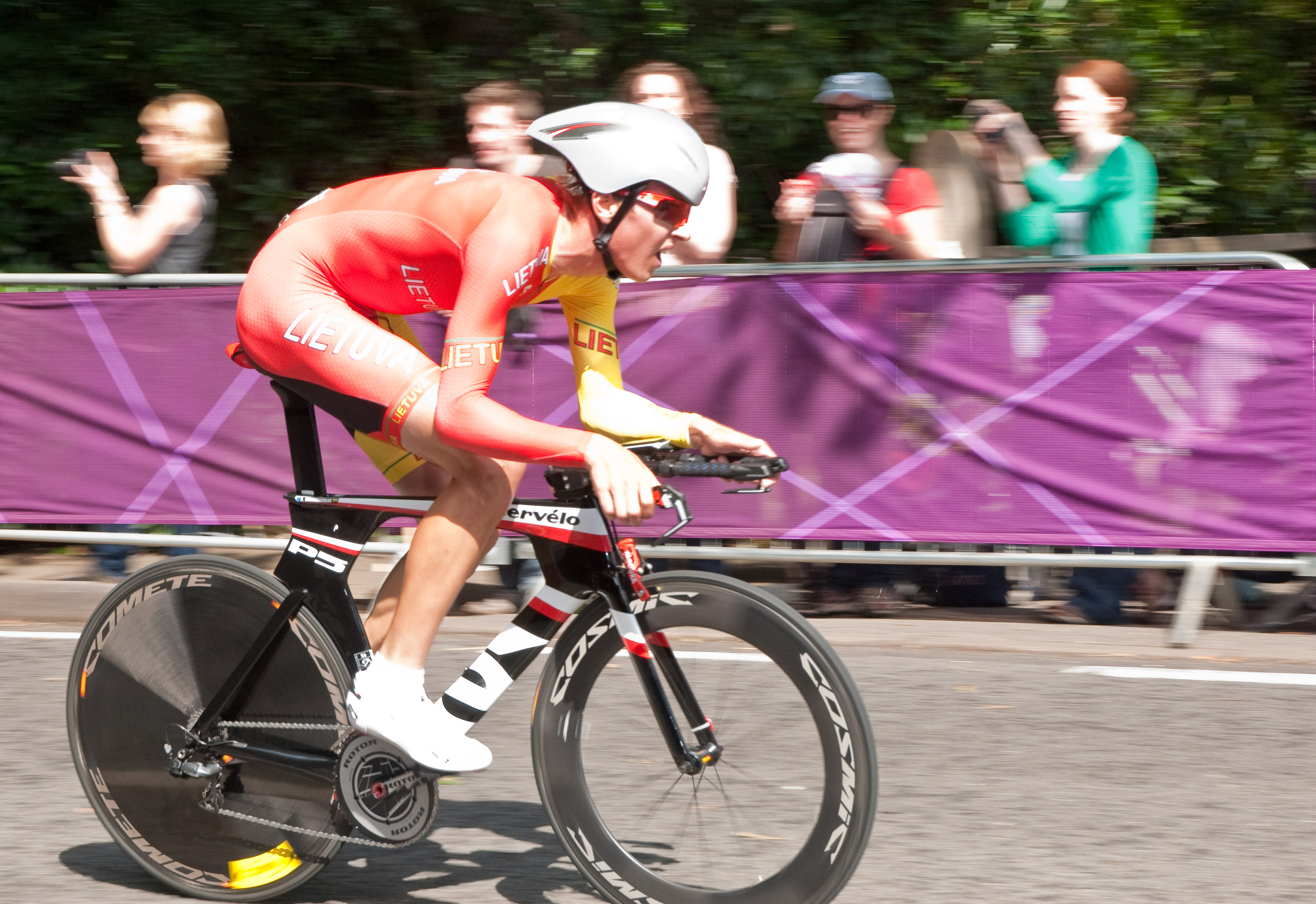
Ramūnas Navardauskas in men's road time trial.

=== Road ===
Athlete	Event	Time	Rank
Gediminas Bagdonas	Men's road race	5:46:37	59
Ramūnas Navardauskas	Men's road race	5:46:37	47
Ramūnas Navardauskas	Men's time trial	55:12.32	21

=== Track ===
Sprint

Athlete	Event	Qualification		Round 1	Repechage 1	Round 2	Repechage 2	Quarterfinals	Semifinals	Final	
Athlete	Event	Time Speed (km/h)	Rank	Opposition Time Speed (km/h)	Opposition Time Speed (km/h)	Opposition Time Speed (km/h)	Opposition Time Speed (km/h)	Opposition Time Speed (km/h)	Opposition Time Speed (km/h)	Opposition Time Speed (km/h)	Rank
Simona Krupeckaitė	Women's sprint	11.234; 64.091	8	Kanis (NED); W 11.528; 62.456	Bye	Panarina (BLR); W 11.486; 62.685	Bye	Vogel (GER); L	Did not advance	5th place final Guerra (CUB); Shulika (UKR); Panarina (BLR); W 11.812	5

Keirin

Athlete	Event	1st round	Repechage	2nd round	Final
Athlete	Event	Rank	Rank	Rank	Rank
Simona Krupeckaitė	Women's keirin	2 Q	Bye	5	7

=== BMX ===
Athlete	Event	Seeding		Semifinal		Final	
Athlete	Event	Result	Rank	Points	Rank	Result	Rank
Vilma Rimšaitė	Women's BMX	42.162	14	19	7	Did not advance	

== Gymnastics ==
=== Artistic ===
Men

Athlete	Event	Qualification								Final							
Athlete	Event	Apparatus						Total	Rank	Apparatus						Total	Rank
Athlete	Event	F	PH	R	V	PB	HB	Total	Rank	F	PH	R	V	PB	HB	Total	Rank
Rokas Guščinas	Pommel horse	—N/a	14.366	—N/a				14.366	17	Did not advance							

Women

Athlete	Event	Qualification						Final					
Athlete	Event	Apparatus				Total	Rank	Apparatus				Total	Rank
Athlete	Event	F	V	UB	BB	Total	Rank	F	V	UB	BB	Total	Rank
Laura Švilpaitė	All-around	12.666	12.233	13.500	11.900	50.299	50	Did not advance					

== Judo ==
Athlete	Event	Round of 32	Round of 16	Quarterfinals	Semifinals	Repechage	Final / BM	
Athlete	Event	Opposition Result	Opposition Result	Opposition Result	Opposition Result	Opposition Result	Opposition Result	Rank
Karolis Bauža	Men's −90 kg	Buffet (FRA); W 0100–0010	Iliadis (GRE); L 0003–0100	Did not advance				
Marius Paškevičius	Men's +100 kg	Fiakaifonu (VAN); W 0100–0000	Silva (BRA); L 0001–1001	Did not advance				

== Modern pentathlon ==
Athlete	Event	Fencing (épée one touch)			Swimming (200 m freestyle)			Riding (show jumping)			Combined: shooting/running (10 m air pistol)/(3000 m)			Total points	Final rank
Athlete	Event	Results	Rank	MP points	Time	Rank	MP points	Penalties	Rank	MP points	Time	Rank	MP Points	Total points	Final rank
Justinas Kinderis	Men's	15–20	=25	760	2:04.35	15	1308	60	12	1140	10:19.34	2	2524	5732	8
Laura Asadauskaitė	Women's	23–12	3	952	2:18.67	17	1136	20	3	1180	11:55.64	6	2140	5408 OR	1st place, gold medalist(s)
Gintarė Venčkauskaitė	Women's	10–25	34	640	2:16.88	11	1160	40	6	1160	11:36.63	2	2216	5176	12

== Rowing ==
Men

Athlete	Event	Heats		Repechage		Quarterfinals		Semifinals		Finals	
Athlete	Event	Time	Rank	Time	Rank	Time	Rank	Time	Rank	Time	Rank
Mindaugas Griškonis	Single sculls	6:46.56	4 R	7:00.19	1 Q	7:00.80	3 SA/B	7:31.72	5 FB	7:15.32	8
Rolandas Maščinskas; Saulius Ritter	Double sculls	6:17.78	=2 SA/B	Bye		—N/a		6:21.62	2 FA	6:42.96	6

Women

Athlete	Event	Heats		Repechage		Quarterfinals		Semifinals		Finals	
Athlete	Event	Time	Rank	Time	Rank	Time	Rank	Time	Rank	Time	Rank
Donata Vištartaitė	Single sculls	7:43.07	2 Q	Bye		7:45.68	3 SA/B	7:56.05	5 FB	7:47.94	8

Qualification Legend: FA=Final A (medal); FB=Final B (non-medal); FC=Final C (non-medal); FD=Final D (non-medal); FE=Final E (non-medal); FF=Final F (non-medal); SA/B=Semifinals A/B; SC/D=Semifinals C/D; SE/F=Semifinals E/F; Q=Quarterfinals; R=Repechage

== Sailing ==
Men

Athlete	Event	Race											Net points	Final rank
Athlete	Event	1	2	3	4	5	6	7	8	9	10	M*	Net points	Final rank
Juozas Bernotas	RS:X	9	13	13	8	9	13	11	17	~~27~~	27	EL	120	12
Rokas Milevičius	Laser	37	37	33	38	43	37	40	43	31	~~46~~	EL	339	42

Women

Athlete	Event	Race											Net points	Final rank
Athlete	Event	1	2	3	4	5	6	7	8	9	10	M*	Net points	Final rank
Gintarė Scheidt	Laser Radial	2	13	9	10	3	~~14~~	11	7	7	6	14	82	6

M = Medal race; EL = Eliminated – did not advance into the medal race;

== Shooting ==
Women

Athlete	Event	Qualification		Final	
Athlete	Event	Points	Rank	Points	Rank
Daina Gudzinevičiūtė	Trap	66	14	Did not advance	

== Swimming ==
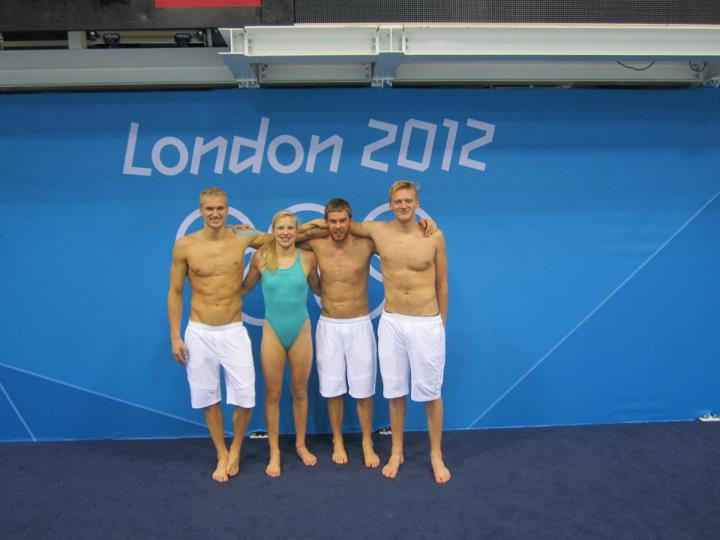
Lithuanian swimmers at the 2012 Summer Olympics (Sadauskas, Meilutytė, Janušaitis, and Titenis)

Men

Athlete	Event	Heat		Semifinal		Final	
Athlete	Event	Time	Rank	Time	Rank	Time	Rank
Vytautas Janušaitis	100 m butterfly	54.17	39	Did not advance			
Vytautas Janušaitis	200 m individual medley	1:59.84	14 Q	2:00.13	13	Did not advance	
Mindaugas Sadauskas	100 m freestyle	49.78	28	Did not advance			
Giedrius Titenis	100 m breaststroke	59.68	3 Q	59.66	5 Q	1:00.84	8
Giedrius Titenis	200 m breaststroke	2:10.36	8 Q	2:09.95	11	Did not advance	

Women

Athlete	Event	Heat		Semifinal		Final	
Athlete	Event	Time	Rank	Time	Rank	Time	Rank
Rūta Meilutytė	50 m freestyle	25.55	26	Did not advance			
Rūta Meilutytė	100 m freestyle	56.33	29	Did not advance			
Rūta Meilutytė	100 m breaststroke	1:05.56 NR	1 Q	1:05.21 EU	1 Q	1:05.47	1st place, gold medalist(s)

== Wrestling ==
Key:

- VT - Victory by Fall.
- PP - Decision by Points - the loser with technical points.
- PO - Decision by Points - the loser without technical points.

Men's Greco-Roman

Athlete	Event	Qualification	Round of 16	Quarterfinal	Semifinal	Repechage 1	Repechage 2	Final / BM	
Athlete	Event	Opposition Result	Opposition Result	Opposition Result	Opposition Result	Opposition Result	Opposition Result	Opposition Result	Rank
Edgaras Venckaitis	−66 kg	Serir (ALG); W 3–1 ^{PP}	Bayakhmetov (KAZ); W 3–1 ^{PP}	Kim H-W (KOR); L 0–3 ^{PO}	Did not advance	Bye	Mulens (CUB); L 1–3 ^{PP}	Did not advance	7
Aleksandr Kazakevič	−74 kg	Bye	Bácsi (HUN); W 5–0 ^{VB}	Rosengren (SWE); W 3–1 ^{PP}	Vlasov (RUS); L 0–3 ^{PO}	Bye		Madsen (DEN); W 3–0 ^{PO}	3rd place, bronze medalist(s)
