= Cuba at the 2012 Summer Olympics =

- IOC code: CUB
- NOC: Cuban Olympic Committee

in London
- Competitors: 111 in 13 sports
- Flag bearers: Mijaín López (opening and closing)
- Medals Ranked 16th: Gold 5 Silver 3 Bronze 7 Total 15

Summer Olympics appearances (overview)
- 1900; 1904; 1908–1920; 1924; 1928; 1932–1936; 1948; 1952; 1956; 1960; 1964; 1968; 1972; 1976; 1980; 1984–1988; 1992; 1996; 2000; 2004; 2008; 2012; 2016; 2020; 2024

Cuba competed at the 2012 Summer Olympics in London, from 27 July to 12 August 2012. This was the nation's nineteenth appearance in the Olympics. With baseball's removal from the Olympic program and the absence of the nation's volleyball team for the first time, the Cuban Olympic Committee sent the nation's smallest delegation to the Games since 1964. A total of 111 athletes, 66 men and 45 women, competed in 13 sports. There was only a single competitor in archery and table tennis.

The Cuban team featured two defending Olympic champions: sprint hurdler Dayron Robles and Greco-Roman wrestler Mijaín López, who reprised his role as the nation's flag bearer at the opening ceremony. Only Lopez managed to successfully defend his Olympic title, in the men's super heavyweight division. Robles, on the other hand, missed out on the medal standings after he was disqualified in the finals. Skeet shooter Guillermo Torres, the oldest athlete of the team at age 53, became the first Cuban athlete to compete in seven Olympic Games since 1980. Other notable Cuban athletes included decathlon bronze medalist Leonel Suárez, swimmer and Pan-American games medalist Hanser García, and four-time Olympic diver José Guerra.

Cuba left London with a total of 14 medals (5 gold, 3 silver, and 6 bronze), its lowest medal tally since the 1976. Four of these medals were awarded to the athletes in boxing, three in judo, and two each in track and field and in wrestling. Among the nation's medalists were heavyweight judoka Idalys Ortiz, who previously won the bronze in Beijing, flyweight boxer Robeisy Ramírez, the youngest athlete of the team at age 18, and pistol shooter Leuris Pupo, who won Cuba's first ever gold medal in his sporting discipline.

In May 2013, Yarelys Barrios was awarded the bronze in the women's discus throw when Russia's Darya Pishchalnikova tested positive for oxandrolone and was thereby stripped of her medal. As a result, Cuba's medal total increased to 15.

== Medalists ==
Medal	Name	Sport	Event	Date
Gold	Leuris Pupo	Shooting	Men's 25 m rapid fire pistol	3 August
Gold	Idalys Ortiz	Judo	Women's +78 kg	3 August
Gold	Mijaín López	Wrestling	Men's Greco-Roman 120 kg	6 August
Gold	Roniel Iglesias	Boxing	Men's light welterweight	11 August
Gold	Robeisy Ramírez	Boxing	Men's flyweight	12 August
Silver	Yanet Bermoy	Judo	Women's 52 kg	29 July
Silver	Asley González	Judo	Men's 90 kg	1 August
Silver	Yarisley Silva	Athletics	Women's pole vault	6 August
Bronze	Iván Cambar	Weightlifting	Men's 77 kg	1 August
Bronze	Yarelys Barrios	Athletics	Women's discus throw	4 August
Bronze	Leonel Suárez	Athletics	Men's decathlon	9 August
Bronze	Lázaro Álvarez	Boxing	Men's bantamweight	10 August
Bronze	Yasniel Toledo	Boxing	Men's lightweight	10 August
Bronze	Robelis Despaigne	Taekwondo	Men's +80 kg	11 August
Bronze	Liván López	Wrestling	Men's freestyle 66 kg	12 August

Medals by sport
Sport	1st place, gold medalist(s)	2nd place, silver medalist(s)	3rd place, bronze medalist(s)	Total
Boxing	2	0	2	4
Judo	1	2	0	3
Shooting	1	0	0	1
Wrestling	1	0	1	2
Athletics	0	1	2	3
Taekwondo	0	0	1	1
Weightlifting	0	0	1	1
Total	5	3	7	15

== Archery ==
Cuba has qualified one archer.

Athlete	Event	Ranking round		Round of 64	Round of 32	Round of 16	Quarterfinals	Semifinals	Final / BM	
Athlete	Event	Score	Seed	Opposition Score	Opposition Score	Opposition Score	Opposition Score	Opposition Score	Opposition Score	Rank
Juan Carlos Stevens	Men's individual	663	34	Rai (IND) (31); L 5–6	Did not advance					

== Athletics ==
Cuban athletes have so far achieved qualifying standards in the following athletics events (up to a maximum of 3 athletes in each event at the 'A' Standard, and 1 at the 'B' Standard):

Key

- Note–Ranks given for track events are within the athlete's heat only
- Q = Qualified for the next round
- q = Qualified for the next round as a fastest loser or, in field events, by position without achieving the qualifying target
- NR = National record
- N/A = Round not applicable for the event
- Bye = Athlete not required to compete in round

Men
Track & road events

Athlete	Event	Heat		Semifinal		Final	
Athlete	Event	Result	Rank	Result	Rank	Result	Rank
Omar Cisneros	400 m hurdles	48.63	3 Q	48.23	3	Did not advance	
Andy González	800 m	1:46.24	4 q	1:53.46	9	Did not advance	
Michael Herrera	200 m	21.05	6	Did not advance			
Orlando Ortega	110 m hurdles	13.26	1 Q	13.26	2 Q	13.43	6
Dayron Robles	110 m hurdles	13.33	1 Q	13.10	1 Q	DSQ	
Roberto Skyers	200 m	20.66	4	Did not advance			
Amaurys Valle	400 m hurdles	49.19	1 Q	50.48	7	Did not advance	
Raidel Acea; Omar Cisneros; William Collazo; Noel Ruíz; Orestes Rodríguez; Amaurys Valle	4 × 400 m relay	3:00.55	3 Q	—N/a		DNF	

Field events

Athlete	Event	Qualification		Final	
Athlete	Event	Distance	Position	Distance	Position
Yoandris Betanzos	Triple jump	16.22	23	Did not advance	
Lázaro Borges	Pole vault	5.50	=16	Did not advance	
Alexis Copello	Triple jump	16.79	11 q	16.92	8
Jorge Fernández	Discus throw	65.34	3 Q	62.02	11
Arnie David Giralt	Triple jump	16.45	16	Did not advance	
Roberto Janet	Hammer throw	73.34	19	Did not advance	
Yunio Lastre	Discus throw	57.33	40	Did not advance	
Guillermo Martínez	Javelin throw	80.06	16	Did not advance	
Víctor Moya	High jump	2.21	20	Did not advance	
Carlos Véliz	Shot put	18.57	34	Did not advance	

Combined events – Decathlon

Athlete	Event	100 m	LJ	SP	HJ	400 m	110H	DT	PV	JT	1500 m	Final	Rank
Yordanis García	Result	10.80	6.75	14.48	1.99	48.76	14.24	42.27	4.60	59.85	4:38.57	7956	14
Yordanis García	Points	906	755	758	794	873	944	711	790	736	689	7956	14
Leonel Suárez	Result	11.27	7.52	14.50	2.11	49.04	14.45	45.75	4.70	76.94	4:30.08	8523	3rd place, bronze medalist(s)
Leonel Suárez	Points	801	940	759	906	859	917	782	819	996	744	8523	3rd place, bronze medalist(s)

Women
Track & road events

Athlete	Event	Heat		Semifinal		Final	
Athlete	Event	Result	Rank	Result	Rank	Result	Rank
Rose Mary Almanza	800 m	2:01.19	4 q	2:01.70	6	Did not advance	
Dailín Belmonte	Marathon	—N/a				2:38:08	70
Nelkys Casabona	200 m	23.82	8	Did not advance			
Rose Mary Almanza; Daysiurami Bonne; Yaimeisi Borlot; Sahily Diago; Aymée Martínez; Diosmely Peña	4 × 400 m relay	3:27.41	6	—N/a		Did not advance	

Field events

Athlete	Event	Qualification		Final	
Athlete	Event	Distance	Position	Distance	Position
Dailenys Alcántara	Triple jump	13.97	15	Did not advance	
Yarelys Barrios	Discus throw	65.94	1 Q	66.38	3rd place, bronze medalist(s)
Dailis Caballero	Pole vault	NM	—	Did not advance	
Denia Caballero	Discus throw	58.78	27	Did not advance	
Yanet Cruz	Javelin throw	NM	—	Did not advance	
Misleydis González	Shot put	17.68	21	Did not advance	
Lesyaní Mayor	High jump	1.85	=20	Did not advance	
Yipsi Moreno	Hammer throw	73.95	6 Q	74.60	6
Yaime Pérez	Discus throw	57.87	30	Did not advance	
Josleidy Ribalta	Triple jump	13.88	19	Did not advance	
Yainelis Ribeaux	Javelin throw	56.55	29	Did not advance	
Yargelis Savigne	Triple jump	14.28	9 q	14.12	9
Yarisley Silva	Pole vault	4.55	=1 q	4.75	2nd place, silver medalist(s)
Arasay Thondike	Hammer throw	67.93	23	Did not advance	
Mailín Vargas	Shot put	16.76	27	Did not advance	
Ariannis Vichy	Hammer throw	67.48	25	Did not advance	

== Boxing ==
Cuba has so far qualified boxers for the following events

Men

Athlete	Event	Round of 32	Round of 16	Quarterfinals	Semifinals	Final	
Athlete	Event	Opposition Result	Opposition Result	Opposition Result	Opposition Result	Opposition Result	Rank
Yosvany Veitia	Light flyweight	Ward (AUS); W 26–4	Zou S (CHN); L 11–14	Did not advance			
Robeisy Ramírez	Flyweight	Susa (JPN); W 19–7	Butdee (THA); W 22–10	Selby (GBR); W 16-11	Conlan (IRL); W 20–10	Tögstsogt (MGL); W 17–14	1st place, gold medalist(s)
Lázaro Álvarez	Bantamweight	Bye	Diaz (USA); W 21–15	Vieira (BRA); W 16–11	Nevin (IRL); L 14–19	Did not advance	3rd place, bronze medalist(s)
Yasniel Toledo	Lightweight	Bye	Liu Q (CHN); W 14-10	Zhailauov (KAZ); W 19–11	Lomachenko (UKR); L 11–14	Did not advance	3rd place, bronze medalist(s)
Roniel Iglesias	Light welterweight	Villaraga (COL); W 20–9	Lopes (BRA); W 18–15	Rahmonov (UZB); W 21–15	Mangiacapre (ITA); W 15–8	Berinchyk (UKR); W 22–15	1st place, gold medalist(s)
Julio César la Cruz	Light heavyweight	Bye	Al-Matbouli (JOR); W 25–8	Falcão (BRA); L 15–18	Did not advance		
José Larduet	Heavyweight	—N/a	Mazaheri (IRI); W DSQ	Russo (ITA); L 16–17	Did not advance		
Erislandy Savón	Super heavyweight	—N/a	Joshua (GBR); L 10–12	Did not advance			

== Canoeing ==
=== Sprint ===
Cuba has qualified boats for the following events

Athlete	Event	Heats		Semifinals		Final	
Athlete	Event	Time	Rank	Time	Rank	Time	Rank
Jorge García	Men's K-1 1000 m	3:30.852	4 Q	3:31.937	5 FB	3:29.938	9
José Carlos Bulnes; Serguey Torres	Men's C-2 1000 m	3:44.341	5 Q	3:41.619	3 FA	3:42.357	6
Darisleydis Amador	Women's K-1 200 m	42.761	5 Q	41.949	5 FB	45.099	12
Darisleydis Amador	Women's K-1 500 m	1:56.038	5 Q	1:58.762	7	Did not advance	
Dayexi Gandarela; Yulitza Meneses	Women's K-2 500 m	1:46.587	6 Q	1:51.428	8 FB	1:50.124	14

Qualification Legend: FA = Qualify to final (medal); FB = Qualify to final B (non-medal)

== Cycling ==
=== Road ===
Athlete	Event	Time	Rank
Arnold Alcolea	Men's road race	5:46:37	67
Yumari González Valdivieso	Women's road race	OTL	

=== Track ===
Sprint

Athlete	Event	Qualification		Round 1	Repechage 1	Round 2	Repechage 2	Quarterfinals	Semifinals	Final	
Athlete	Event	Time Speed (km/h)	Rank	Opposition Time Speed (km/h)	Opposition Time Speed (km/h)	Opposition Time Speed (km/h)	Opposition Time Speed (km/h)	Opposition Time Speed (km/h)	Opposition Time Speed (km/h)	Opposition Time Speed (km/h)	Rank
Lisandra Guerra	Women's sprint	11.109; 64.812	6	Gaviria (COL); W 11.390; 63.213	Bye	Lee W S (HKG); W 11.485; 62.690	Bye	Guo S (CHN); L	Did not advance	5th place final Krupeckaitė (LTU); Shulika (UKR); Panarina (BLR); L	6

Keirin

Athlete	Event	1st Round	Repechage	2nd Round	Final
Athlete	Event	Rank	Rank	Rank	Rank
Lisandra Guerra	Women's keirin	3 R	4	Did not advance	13

Omnium

Athlete	Event	Flying lap		Points race		Elimination race	Individual pursuit		Scratch race	Time trial		Total points	Rank
Athlete	Event	Time	Rank	Points	Rank	Rank	Time	Rank	Rank	Time	Rank	Total points	Rank
Marlies Mejías	Women's omnium	14.554	8	4	12	9	3:41.897	9	14	35.912	5	57	8

== Diving ==
Cuba has qualified in the following events.

Men

Athlete	Event	Preliminaries		Semifinals		Final	
Athlete	Event	Points	Rank	Points	Rank	Points	Rank
Jeinkler Aguirre	10 m platform	453.50	10 Q	436.95	18	Did not advance	
José Guerra	10 m platform	440.90	17 Q	501.90	9 Q	527.70	5
Jeinkler Aguirre; José Guerra	10 m synchronized platform	—N/a				450.90	5

Women

Athlete	Event	Preliminaries		Semifinals		Final	
Athlete	Event	Points	Rank	Points	Rank	Points	Rank
Annia Rivera	10 m platform	233.95	25	Did not advance			

== Judo ==
Men

Athlete	Event	Round of 32	Round of 16	Quarterfinals	Semifinals	Repechage	Final / BM	
Athlete	Event	Opposition Result	Opposition Result	Opposition Result	Opposition Result	Opposition Result	Opposition Result	Rank
Asley González	−90 kg	Campos (ARG); W 1000–0000	Gerasimenko (SRB); W 0011–0002	Anthony (AUS); W 0010–0002	Denisov (RUS); W 1000–0001	Bye	Song D-n (KOR); L 0001–0101	2nd place, silver medalist(s)
Oreidis Despaigne	−100 kg	Bye	Sayidov (UZB); L 010H–0102	Did not advance				
Óscar Brayson	+100 kg	Padar (EST); W 0100–0001	Blas Jr. (GUM); W 0100–0001	Riner (FRA); L 0001–0100	Did not advance	Makarau (BLR); L 0000–1001	Did not advance	7

Women

Athlete	Event	Round of 32	Round of 16	Quarterfinals	Semifinals	Repechage	Final / BM	
Athlete	Event	Opposition Result	Opposition Result	Opposition Result	Opposition Result	Opposition Result	Opposition Result	Rank
Dayaris Mestre	−48 kg	Kondratyeva (RUS); W 0101–0000	Dumitru (ROU); L 0000–1000	Did not advance				
Yanet Bermoy	−52 kg	Bye	Bundmaa (MGL); W 0020–0000	Müller (LUX); W 0011–0002	Heylen (BEL); W 0011–0002	Bye	An K-a (PRK); L 0000–0001	2nd place, silver medalist(s)
Yurisleydis Lupetey	−57 kg	Boukouvala (GRE); W 0011–0001	Zabludina (RUS); L 0001–0100	Did not advance				
Yaritza Abel	−63 kg	Bye	Émane (FRA); L 0001–0001 YUS	Did not advance				
Onix Cortés	−70 kg	Bye	Tachimoto (JPN); L 0000–0001	Did not advance				
Idalys Ortiz	+78 kg	Bye	Moniz (CPV); W 0103–0002	Ivashchenko (RUS); W 0011–0002	Tong W (CHN); W 0010–0001	Bye	Sugimoto (JPN); W 0000–0001	1st place, gold medalist(s)

== Rowing ==
Cuba has qualified the following boats.

Men

Athlete	Event	Heats		Repechage		Quarterfinals		Semifinals		Final	
Athlete	Event	Time	Rank	Time	Rank	Time	Rank	Time	Rank	Time	Rank
Ángel Fournier	Single sculls	6:46.35	2 QF	Bye		6:54.12	2 SA/B	7:30.19	4 FB	7:11.17	7
Yunior Pérez; Manuel Suárez	Lightweight double sculls	6:36.31	3 R	6:37.04	1 SA/B	—N/a		6:52.26	6 FB	6:34.96	10

Women

Athlete	Event	Heats		Repechage		Quarterfinals		Semifinals		Final	
Athlete	Event	Time	Rank	Time	Rank	Time	Rank	Time	Rank	Time	Rank
Yariulvis Cobas	Single sculls	7:48.58	4 QF	Bye		7:56.89	5 SC/D	7:54.22	2 FC	8:14.59	15
Yoslaine Domínguez; Yaima Velázquez	Lightweight double sculls	7:12.99	4 R	7:19.33	3 SA/B	—N/a		7:21.86	6 FB	7:23.25	10

Qualification Legend: FA=Final A (medal); FB=Final B (non-medal); FC=Final C (non-medal); FD=Final D (non-medal); FE=Final E (non-medal); FF=Final F (non-medal); SA/B=Semifinals A/B; SC/D=Semifinals C/D; SE/F=Semifinals E/F; QF=Quarterfinals; R=Repechage

== Shooting ==
Cuba has qualified four quota places in the shooting events;

Men

Athlete	Event	Qualification		Final	
Athlete	Event	Points	Rank	Points	Rank
Leuris Pupo	25 m rapid fire pistol	286	4	34 WR	1st place, gold medalist(s)
Guillermo Torres	Skeet	110	30	Did not advance	

Women

Athlete	Event	Qualification		Final	
Athlete	Event	Points	Rank	Points	Rank
Eglis Yaima Cruz	50 m rifle 3 positions	581	16	Did not advance	
Eglis Yaima Cruz	10 m air rifle	391	44	Did not advance	
Dianelys Pérez	50 m rifle 3 positions	579	21	Did not advance	
Dianelys Pérez	10 m air rifle	393	29	Did not advance	

== Swimming ==
Cuban swimmers have so far achieved qualifying standards in the following events (up to a maximum of 2 swimmers in each event at the Olympic Qualifying Time (OQT), and 1 at the Olympic Selection Time (OST)):

Men

Athlete	Event	Heat		Semifinal		Final	
Athlete	Event	Time	Rank	Time	Rank	Time	Rank
Hanser García	50 m freestyle	22.45	23	Did not advance			
Hanser García	100 m freestyle	48.97	15 Q	48.04 NR	3 Q	48.04 =NR	7
Pedro Medel	100 m backstroke	55.40	34	Did not advance			
Pedro Medel	200 m backstroke	2:00.05	27	Did not advance			

== Table tennis ==
Cuba has qualified 1 athlete.

Athlete	Event	Preliminary round	Round 1	Round 2	Round 3	Round 4	Quarterfinals	Semifinals	Final / BM	
Athlete	Event	Opposition Result	Opposition Result	Opposition Result	Opposition Result	Opposition Result	Opposition Result	Opposition Result	Opposition Result	Rank
Andy Pereira	Men's singles	Shing (VAN); W 4–0	Bobocica (ITA); L 0–4	Did not advance						

== Taekwondo ==
Cuba has qualified 1 man and 2 women.

Athlete	Event	Round of 16	Quarterfinals	Semifinals	Repechage	Bronze Medal	Final	
Athlete	Event	Opposition Result	Opposition Result	Opposition Result	Opposition Result	Opposition Result	Opposition Result	Rank
Robelis Despaigne	Men's +80 kg	Chukwumerije (NGR); W 1–0	Obame (GAB); L 6–7 SDP	Did not advance	Thomsen-Fuataga (SAM); W 14–2 PTG	Keita (MLI); W WO	Did not advance	3rd place, bronze medalist(s)
Nidia Muñoz	Women's −57 kg	Paoli (LIB); L 2–4	Did not advance					
Glenhis Hernández	Women's +67 kg	Dislam (MAR); W 1–0 SDP	Konieva (UKR); W 16–2 PTG	Graffe (FRA); L 4–6	Did not advance	Espinoza (MEX); L 2–4	Did not advance	

== Weightlifting ==
Cuba has qualified 4 men.

Athlete	Event	Snatch		Clean & Jerk		Total	Rank
Athlete	Event	Result	Rank	Result	Rank	Total	Rank
Sergio Álvarez	Men's −56 kg	121	8	~~150~~	DNF	121	DNF
Yasmani Romero	Men's −56 kg	112	14	146	10	258	11
Iván Cambar	Men's −77 kg	155	5	194	2	349	3rd place, bronze medalist(s)
Yoelmis Hernández	Men's −85 kg	163	9	205	6	368	7

== Wrestling ==
Cuba has qualified quota places in the following events

Key:

- VT – Victory by Fall.
- PP – Decision by Points – the loser with technical points.
- PO – Decision by Points – the loser without technical points.

Men's freestyle

Athlete	Event	Qualification	Round of 16	Quarterfinal	Semifinal	Repechage 1	Repechage 2	Final / BM	
Athlete	Event	Opposition Result	Opposition Result	Opposition Result	Opposition Result	Opposition Result	Opposition Result	Opposition Result	Rank
Yowlys Bonne	−60 kg	Bye	Yumoto (JPN); L 1–3 ^{PP}	Did not advance					14
Liván López	−66 kg	Taghavi (IRI); W 3–1 ^{PP}	Yonemitsu (JPN); L 1–3 ^{PP}	Did not advance		Bye	Garcia (CAN); W 3–1 ^{PP}	Hasanov (AZE); W 3–1 ^{PP}	3rd place, bronze medalist(s)
Humberto Arencibia	−84 kg	Bye	Herbert (USA); L 1–3 ^{PP}	Did not advance					13
Javier Cortina	−96 kg	Bye	Pliev (CAN); L 1–3 ^{PP}	Did not advance					13

Men's Greco-Roman

Athlete	Event	Qualification	Round of 16	Quarterfinal	Semifinal	Repechage 1	Repechage 2	Final / BM	
Athlete	Event	Opposition Result	Opposition Result	Opposition Result	Opposition Result	Opposition Result	Opposition Result	Opposition Result	Rank
Gustavo Balart	−55 kg	Bye	Karakuş (TUR); W 3–0 ^{PO}	Choi G-J (KOR); L 1–3 ^{PP}	Did not advance				8
Hanser Meoque	−60 kg	Bye	Jung J-H (KOR); L 0–3 ^{PO}	Did not advance					19
Pedro Mulens	−66 kg	Bye	Kim H-W (KOR); L 0–3 ^{PO}	Did not advance		Varderesyan (ARM); W 3–0 ^{PO}	Venckaitis (LTU); W 3–1 ^{PP}	Guénot (FRA); L 0–3 ^{PO}	5
Alexei Bell	−74 kg	Provisor (USA); L 1–3 ^{PP}	Did not advance						12
Pablo Shorey	−84 kg	Akhlaghi (IRI); W 3–1 ^{PP}	Betts (USA); W 3–0 ^{PO}	Janikowski (POL); L 0–5 ^{VT}	Did not advance				7
Yunior Estrada	−96 kg	Bye	Vála (CZE); W 3–1 ^{PP}	Ayari (TUN); W 3–0 ^{PO}	Rezaei (IRI); L 0–3 ^{PO}	Bye		Aleksanyan (ARM); L 0–3 ^{PO}	5
Mijaín López	−120 kg	Bye	El-Trabely (EGY); W 3–0 ^{PO}	Pherselidze (GEO); W 3–0 ^{PO}	Kayaalp (TUR); W 3–0 ^{PO}	Bye		Nabi (EST); W 3–0 ^{PO}	1st place, gold medalist(s)

Women's freestyle

Athlete	Event	Qualification	Round of 16	Quarterfinal	Semifinal	Repechage 1	Repechage 2	Final / BM	
Athlete	Event	Opposition Result	Opposition Result	Opposition Result	Opposition Result	Opposition Result	Opposition Result	Opposition Result	Rank
Katerina Vidiaux	−63 kg	Yeşilırmak (TUR); W 5–0 ^{VT}	Volosova (RUS); L 0–3 ^{PO}	Did not advance					8

== See also ==
- Cuba at the 2011 Pan American Games
