= Frank Stäbler =

German Greco-Roman wrestler

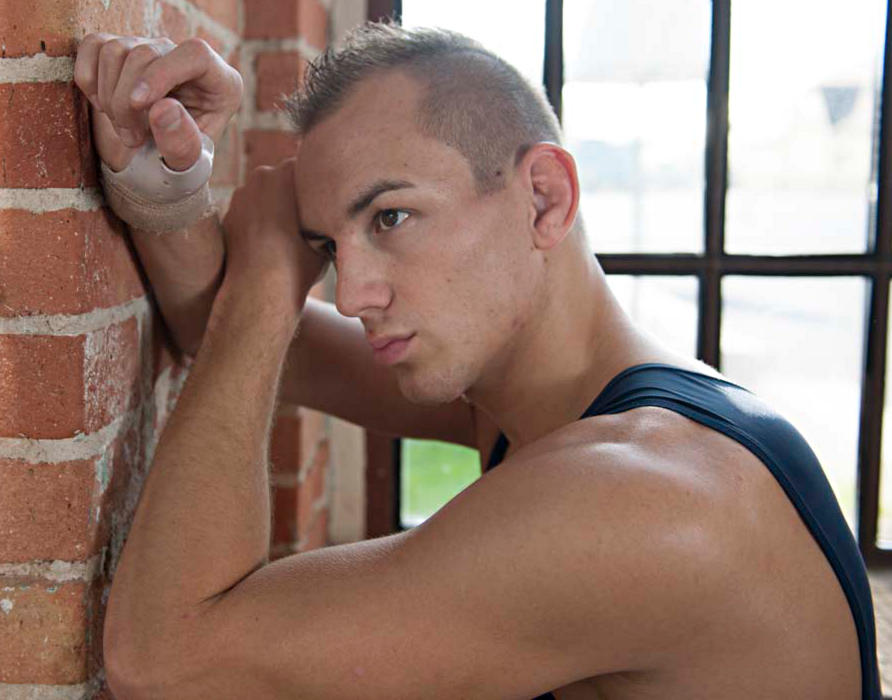
- Stäbler in 2014

Personal information
- Born: 27 June 1989 (age 37) Böblingen, West Germany
- Height: 1.74 m (5 ft 9 in)
- Weight: 66 kg (146 lb)
- Website: Frank-Staebler.com

Sport
- Country: Germany
- Sport: Wrestling
- Event: Greco-Roman
- Club: TSV Musberg; Red Devils Heilbronn
- Coached by: Janis Zamanduridis
Medal record
Men's Greco-Roman wrestling
Representing Germany
Olympic Games
| Bronze medal – third place | 2020 Tokyo | 67 kg |
World Championships
| Gold medal – first place | 2015 Las Vegas | 66 kg |
| Gold medal – first place | 2017 Paris | 71 kg |
| Gold medal – first place | 2018 Budapest | 72 kg |
| Bronze medal – third place | 2013 Budapest | 66 kg |
| Bronze medal – third place | 2019 Nur-Sultan | 67 kg |
European Games
| Bronze medal – third place | 2015 Baku | 71 kg |
European Championships
| Gold medal – first place | 2012 Belgrade | 66 kg |
| Gold medal – first place | 2020 Rome | 72 kg |
| Bronze medal – third place | 2014 Vantaa | 66 kg |

Frank Stäbler (also spelled Staebler; born 27 June 1989) is a German Greco-Roman wrestler. He won the 2012 European Championship and 2015 World Championship in the welterweight category. Stäbler trains at TSV Musberg in Leinfelden-Echterdingen, Germany, coached by Janis Zamanduridis from the national wrestling team.

== Career ==
Stäbler represented Germany at the 2012 Summer Olympics in London, where he competed in the 66 kg class in men's Greco-Roman wrestling. He received a bye for the second preliminary match, before losing out to Hungary's Tamás Lőrincz, who was able to score six points in two straight periods, leaving Stäbler with a single point. Because his opponent advanced further into the final match, Stäbler offered another shot for the bronze medal by successfully defeating United States' Justin Lester in the repechage bout. However, he lost the bronze medal match to Georgia's Manuchar Tskhadaia, who pushed him out of the wrestling mat in the third period, with a score of 1–3.

== International achievements ==
| Year | Rank | Competition | Weight class | Achievement |
| 2005 | 7. | Junior-ECh (Cadets) in Tirana | under 50 kg | Winner: David Musaev (Russia) |
| 2006 | 3. | Junior-ECh (Cadets) in Istanbul | under 58 kg | after Rahman Bilici (Rumania) und Ibrahim Erdzhan (Bulgaria) |
| 2009 | 3. | Junior-ECh in Tiflis | Light | after win over Benedikt Puffer (Austria), Paata Bakunidse (Georgia), Mate Hencz (Slovakia) und Oskar Parra Fernandez (Spain) and loss against Jakub Tim (Poland) |
| 2009 | 3. | Junior-WCh in Ankara | Light | after win over Sebastian Brandström (Sweden), and loss against Saeid Abdevali |
| 2010 | 1. | Intern. Tournament in Sassari | Light | after Christian Fetzer and Marcus Thätner |
| 2010 | 12. | ECh in Baku | Light | after win in points over Frederik Ekström (Denmarn) |
| 2011 | 3. | Granma-Cerro Pelado-Cup in Havana | Light | after Reineri Salas Perez und Reinier Lescuy (both from Cuba) |
| 2011 | 7. | Wladiyslaw-Pytlasinski-Memorial in Radom | Light | Winner: Ambako Vachadze (Russia) |
| 2011 | 5. | WM in Istanbul | Light | after win in points over Ivan de Jesus Duque Arango (Columbia), Mateusz Wanke (Poland) and Darchan Bajachmedow (Kazakhstan) |
| 2012 | 1. | "Thor-Masters" in Nykøbing Falster | Light | after win over Juri Denisow (Russia), Artyom Wesialonu (Belarus), Marius Thommesen (Norway), Danielo de Feola (Sweden) und Mateusz Wanke (Poland) |
| 2012 | 2. | Granma-Cerro Pelado-Cup in Havanna | Light | after win over Tiziano Corriga (Italy) und Miguel Martinez (Cuba) and loss against Pedro Mulens Herrera (Cuba) |
| 2012 | 1. | ECh in Belgrad | Light | after win over Sergejs Mironovs (Latvia), Ove Günther (Sweden), Hugo Da Silva Passos (Portugal), Alexander Maksimovic (Serbia) und Georgian Carpen (Rumania) |
| 2012 | 1. | Gran Prix of Germany in Dortmund | Light | after win over Ondrej Ulip (Czech Republic), Matthias Maasch (Germany), Alan Dschakajew (Ukraine) und Hassan Alijew (Azerbaijan) |
| 2012 | 5. | OG in London | Light | after win over Justin Lester (USA) and loss against Tamás Lőrincz (Hungary), Manuchar Chadaia (Georgia) |
| 2013 | 1. | Gran Prix of Germany in Dortmund | Light | after win over Andreas Eisenkrein (Germany), Edgar Melkumow (Poland), Marius Thomessen (Norway) und Daniel Janecis (Croatia) |
| 2013 | 1. | "Ion-Cerneanu"-Memorial in Târgoviște | Light | after win over Georgian Carpen (Rumania), Alexander Chwoschtsch und Witali Kononow (both from Ukraine) |
| 2013 | 3. | WCh in Budapest | Light | after win over Yerbol Konitarov (Kazakhstan), Edgaras Venckaitis (Lithuania), Hasan Aliyev (Azerbaijan) and loss against Islambek Albijew (Russia) |
| 2014 | 3. | ECh in Vantaa | Light | after win over Davor Stefanek (Serbia), Marius Thommesen (Norway) and loss against Hasan Aliyev (Azerbaijan) |
| 2014 | 3. | "Wladyslaw-Pytlasinski"-Memorial in Danzig | Light | behind Hamid Sokyano, Iran and Dominik Etlinger, Croatia, together with Edgaras Venckaitis |
| 2014 | 1. | Intern. Tournament in Bucharest | Light | after win over Jung Ji-hyun (South Korea), Georgian Carpen and Yunus Özel (Turkey) |
| 2014 | 5. | WCh in Tashkent | Light | |
| 2015 | 3. | 1st European Games in Baku | under 71 kg | after win over Woitiech Jakus (Slovakia); Pavel Lyach (Belarus); Zacharias Tallroth (Sweden); and Mindia Zukulidse (Georgia); and loss against Balint Korpasi (Hungary) |
| 2015 | 1. | WCh in Las Vegas | under 66 kg | after win over Hansu Ryu, Bryce Saddoris and Davor Stefanek |
| 2017 | 1. | Gran Prix of Poland in Warsaw | under 71 kg | after win over Danijel Janecic (Croatia), Takeshi Izumi (Japan) and Balint Korpasi (Hungary) |
| 2017 | 1. | WCh in Paris | under 71 kg | after win over Demeu Zhadrayev (Kazakhstan), Mohammad Ali Geraei (Iran) |
| 2018 | 1. | WCh in Budapest | under 72 kg | after win over Georgi Khutchua (Georgia), Abuiazid Mantsigov (Russia), Demeu Zhadrayev (Kazakhstan), Rasul Chunayev (Azerbaijan) und Bálint Korpási (Hungary). |

- all competitions are held in Greco-Roman style of wrestling
- OG – Olympic Games; ECh – European Championships; WCh – World Championships
- Light weight is a class under 66 kg in UWW classification.

== German Championships ==
(only Senior)

| Year | Place | Weight class | Comment |
| 2009 | 10 | Light | Winner: Christian Fetzer ( TSV Herbrechtingen) |
| 2010 | 2 | Light | lost to Christian Fetzer |
| 2011 | 3 | Light | lost to Marcus Thätner and Christian Fetzer |
| 2013 | 1 | Light | win against Toni Stade (RSV Greiz), Sven Dürmeier (SV Johannis Nürnberg) and Benjamin Raiser (ASV Nendingen) |
| 2015 | 1 | Light | win against Maximilian Schwabe (KSV Pausa), Fabian Reiner (KSV Tennenbronn) and Sven Dürmeier (SV Johannis Nürnberg) |

== Trivia ==
Stäbler's logo, which appears on the official merchandise, his video diary and printed media, is a jumping squirrel. During the final fight in 2012 European Wrestling Championships, Stäbler literally jumped on the opponent and won the title of European champion 2012. Later, this jump was called as "squirrel jump" (orig. "Eichhörnchen Sprung") by German journalists.
