= Wrestling at the 2012 Summer Olympics – Men's Greco-Roman 66 kg =

Men's Greco-Roman 66 kg at the Games of the XXX Olympiad
- Venue: ExCeL London
- Date: 7 August 2012
- Competitors: 19 from 19 nations

Medalists
1st place, gold medalist(s)		Kim Hyeon-woo	South Korea
2nd place, silver medalist(s)		Tamás Lőrincz	Hungary
3rd place, bronze medalist(s)		Manuchar Tskhadaia	Georgia
3rd place, bronze medalist(s)		Steeve Guénot	France

Men's Greco-Roman 66 kilograms competition at the 2012 Summer Olympics in London, United Kingdom, took place on 7 August at ExCeL London. This Greco-Roman wrestling competition consists of a single-elimination tournament, with a repechage used to determine the winner of two bronze medals. The two finalists face off for gold and silver medals. Each wrestler who loses to one of the two finalists moves into the repechage, culminating in a pair of bronze medal matches featuring the semifinal losers each facing the remaining repechage opponent from their half of the bracket.

Each bout consists of up to three rounds, lasting two minutes apiece. The wrestler who scores more points in each round is the winner of that rounds; the bout ends when one wrestler has won two rounds (and thus the match).

== Schedule ==
All times are British Summer Time (UTC+01:00)

Date	Time	Event
7 August 2012	13:00	Qualification rounds
7 August 2012	17:45	Repechage
7 August 2012	18:45	Finals

== Results ==
=== Final ===
Final
Tamás Lőrincz (HUN)	0	0
Kim Hyeon-woo (KOR)	1	2

=== Top half ===
Qualifications

1/8 finals
Justin Lester (USA)	3	3
Tsutomu Fujimura (JPN)	0	1
Tamás Lőrincz (HUN)	4	2
Frank Stäbler (GER)	1	0
Pascal Strebel (SUI)	0	1
Manuchar Tskhadaia (GEO)	2	5
Ashraf El-Gharably (EGY)	1	1	3
Orlando Huacón (ECU)	1	0	1

1/4 finals
Justin Lester (USA)	2	0	0
Tamás Lőrincz (HUN)	0	1	2
Manuchar Tskhadaia (GEO)	5	1
Ashraf El-Gharably (EGY)	0	0

Semifinals
Tamás Lőrincz (HUN)	3	4
Manuchar Tskhadaia (GEO)	0	0

=== Bottom half ===
Qualifications
Hovhannes Varderesyan (ARM)	0	0
Kim Hyeon-woo (KOR)	1	3
Edgaras Venckaitis (LTU)	5	0	1
Mohamed Serir (ALG)	0	1	0
Darkhan Bayakhmetov (KAZ)	1	1
Aleksandar Maksimović (SRB)	0	0

1/8 finals
Wuileixis Rivas (VEN)	0	0
Steeve Guénot (FRA)	1	1
Atakan Yüksel (TUR)	0	0
Saeid Abdevali (IRI)	1	3
Pedro Mulens (CUB)	0	0
Kim Hyeon-woo (KOR)	1	1
Edgaras Venckaitis (LTU)	0	2	4
Darkhan Bayakhmetov (KAZ)	2	0	0

1/4 finals
Steeve Guénot (FRA)	3	1
Saeid Abdevali (IRI)	0	0
Kim Hyeon-woo (KOR)	3	1
Edgaras Venckaitis (LTU)	0	0

Semifinals
Steeve Guénot (FRA)	2	0	0
Kim Hyeon-woo (KOR)	1	1	1

=== Repechage ===
Repechage round 1
Hovhannes Varderesyan (ARM)	0	0
Pedro Mulens (CUB)	1	2

Repechage round 2
Frank Stäbler (GER)	5	5
Justin Lester (USA)	0	0
Pedro Mulens (CUB)	0	2	2
Edgaras Venckaitis (LTU)	1	0	0

Bronze medals
Frank Stäbler (GER)	0	1
Manuchar Tskhadaia (GEO)	1	2
Pedro Mulens (CUB)	0	0
Steeve Guénot (FRA)	4	1

== Final standing ==
Rank	Athlete
1st place, gold medalist(s)	Kim Hyeon-woo (KOR)
2nd place, silver medalist(s)	Tamás Lőrincz (HUN)
3rd place, bronze medalist(s)	Manuchar Tskhadaia (GEO)
3rd place, bronze medalist(s)	Steeve Guénot (FRA)
5	Frank Stäbler (GER)
5	Pedro Mulens (CUB)
7	Edgaras Venckaitis (LTU)
8	Justin Lester (USA)
9	Darkhan Bayakhmetov (KAZ)
10	Ashraf El-Gharably (EGY)
11	Saeid Abdevali (IRI)
12	Orlando Huacón (ECU)
13	Tsutomu Fujimura (JPN)
13	Mohamed Serir (ALG)
15	Pascal Strebel (SUI)
16	Aleksandar Maksimović (SRB)
16	Wuileixis Rivas (VEN)
18	Atakan Yüksel (TUR)
19	Hovhannes Varderesyan (ARM)
