= Alain Milián =

Cuban Greco-Roman wrestler

Alaín Milián
Personal information
- Nationality: Cuba
- Born: 15 January 1983 (age 43) Ciego de Ávila, Cuba
- Height: 1.69 m (5 ft 7 in)
- Weight: 66 kg (146 lb)

Sport
- Sport: Wrestling
- Event: Greco-Roman
- Club: Cerro Pelado
- Coached by: Pedro Val
Medal record
Men's Greco-Roman wrestling
Representing Cuba
Pan American Games
Bronze medal – third place	2007 Rio de Janeiro	66 kg
World Championships
Bronze medal – third place	2005 Budapest	66 kg

Alaín Milián (born 15 January 1983) is an amateur Cuban Greco-Roman wrestler, who played for the men's welterweight category. He won two bronze medals for his division at the 2005 World Wrestling Championships in Budapest, Hungary, and at the 2007 Pan American Games in Rio de Janeiro, Brazil.

Milian represented Cuba at the 2008 Summer Olympics in Beijing, where he competed for the men's 66 kg class. He lost the qualifying match to France's Steeve Guénot, who was able to score five points in two straight periods, leaving Milian with a single point. Because his opponent advanced further into the final match, Milian offered another shot for the bronze medal by entering the repechage bouts. He defeated Hungary's Tamás Lőrincz in the first round, before losing out his next match to Belarus' Mikhail Siamionau, with a two-set technical score (1–1, 1–3) and a classification point score of 1–3.
