= Wrestling at the 2010 Asian Games – Men's Greco-Roman 66 kg =

Men's Greco-Roman 66 kg at the 2010 Asian Games
- Venue: Huagong Gymnasium
- Date: 21 November 2010
- Competitors: 12 from 12 nations

Medalists
gold medal	Saeid Abdevali	Iran
silver medal	Darkhan Bayakhmetov	Kazakhstan
bronze medal	Sunil Kumar Rana	India
bronze medal	Tsutomu Fujimura	Japan

The men's Greco-Roman 66 kilograms wrestling competition at the 2010 Asian Games in Guangzhou was held on 21 November 2010 at the Huagong Gymnasium.

This Greco-Roman wrestling competition consisted of a single-elimination tournament, with a repechage used to determine the winner of two bronze medals. The two finalists faced off for gold and silver medals. Each wrestler who lost to one of the two finalists moved into the repechage, culminating in a pair of bronze medal matches featuring the semifinal losers each facing the remaining repechage opponent from their half of the bracket.

Each bout consisted of up to three rounds, lasting two minutes apiece. The wrestler who scored more points in each round was the winner of that rounds; the bout finished when one wrestler had won two rounds (and thus the match).

== Schedule ==
All times are China Standard Time (UTC+08:00)

Date	Time	Event
Sunday, 21 November 2010	09:30	1/8 finals
Sunday, 21 November 2010	09:30	Quarterfinals
Sunday, 21 November 2010	09:30	Semifinals
Sunday, 21 November 2010	16:00	Repechages
Sunday, 21 November 2010	17:00	Finals

== Results ==
Legend

- F — Won by fall

=== Main bracket ===
1/8 finals
Daniar Ibraimov (KGZ)	0	1
Kim Hyeon-woo (KOR)	1	3
Zheng Pan (CHN)	0	0
Tsutomu Fujimura (JPN)	2	4
Akhmad Kadyrov (TJK)	0	3	0
Hussein Abbas (IRQ)	1	0	1
Darkhan Bayakhmetov (KAZ)	6	1
Besiki Saldadze (UZB)	0	0

Quarterfinals
Saeid Abdevali (IRI)	5	3
Sutep Oomchompoo (THA)	0	0
Ýazgeldi Kadyrow (TKM)	0	0
Sunil Kumar Rana (IND)	1	4
Kim Hyeon-woo (KOR)	1	0
Tsutomu Fujimura (JPN)	2	2
Hussein Abbas (IRQ)	0	0
Darkhan Bayakhmetov (KAZ)	3	2

Semifinals
Saeid Abdevali (IRI)	4	1
Sunil Kumar Rana (IND)	0	0
Tsutomu Fujimura (JPN)	0	0
Darkhan Bayakhmetov (KAZ)	1	3

Final
Saeid Abdevali (IRI)	0	3	4
Darkhan Bayakhmetov (KAZ)	1	0	0

=== Repechage ===
Repechage round 1
Besiki Saldadze (UZB)	1	2
Hussein Abbas (IRQ)	0	0

Bronze medals
Sutep Oomchompoo (THA)	0	0
Sunil Kumar Rana (IND)	1	3^{F}
Besiki Saldadze (UZB)	2	0	0
Tsutomu Fujimura (JPN)	0	3	1

== Final standing ==
Rank	Athlete
1st place, gold medalist(s)	Saeid Abdevali (IRI)
2nd place, silver medalist(s)	Darkhan Bayakhmetov (KAZ)
3rd place, bronze medalist(s)	Sunil Kumar Rana (IND)
3rd place, bronze medalist(s)	Tsutomu Fujimura (JPN)
5	Sutep Oomchompoo (THA)
5	Besiki Saldadze (UZB)
7	Kim Hyeon-woo (KOR)
8	Hussein Abbas (IRQ)
9	Akhmad Kadyrov (TJK)
10	Daniar Ibraimov (KGZ)
11	Ýazgeldi Kadyrow (TKM)
12	Zheng Pan (CHN)
