= Wrestling at the 2011 Pan American Games – Men's Greco-Roman 66 kg =

Men's Greco–Roman 66 kg at the 2011 Pan American Games
- Venue: CODE II Gymnasium
- Dates: October 20
- Competitors: 9 from 9 nations

Medalists
Gold medal	Pedro Mulens	Cuba
Silver medal	Anyelo Mota	Dominican Republic
Bronze medal	Ulises Barragan	Mexico
Bronze medal	Glenn Garrison	United States

The men's Greco–Roman 66 kg competition of the wrestling events at the 2011 Pan American Games in Guadalajara, Mexico, was held on October 20 at the CODE II Gymanasium. The defending champion was Justin Harry Lester of the United States.

This Greco-Roman wrestling competition consists of a single-elimination tournament, with a repechage used to determine the winner of two bronze medals. The two finalists face off for gold and silver medals. Each wrestler who loses to one of the two finalists moves into the repechage, culminating in a pair of bronze medal matches featuring the semifinal losers each facing the remaining repechage opponent from their half of the bracket.

Each bout consists of up to three rounds, lasting two minutes apiece. The wrestler who scores more points in each round is the winner of that rounds; the bout ends when one wrestler has won two rounds (and thus the match).

== Schedule ==
All times are Central Standard Time (UTC-6).

Date	Time	Round
October 20, 2011	10:00	Eighth finals
October 20, 2011	10:08	Preliminary bouts
October 20, 2011	11:12	Semifinals
October 20, 2011	18:00	Bronze medal matches
October 20, 2011	18:40	Final

== Results ==
=== Main bracket ===
1/8 Finals
Pedro Mulens (CUB)	5	2
Vincente Huacon (ECU)	0	0

Quarterfinals
Anyelo Mota (DOM)	2	2
Jefrin Mejia (HON)	0	0
Ulises Barragan (MEX)	1	7
Manuel Torres (VEN)	0	0
Ivan Duque (COL)	2	0	0
Glenn Garrison (USA)	0	2	2
Shawn Daye (CAN)	0	0
Pedro Mulens (CUB)	2	6

Semifinals
Anyelo Mota (DOM)	0	3	1
Ulises Barragan (MEX)	3	0	1
Glenn Garrison (USA)	0	0
Pedro Mulens (CUB)	1	2

Finals
Anyelo Mota (DOM)	0	0
Pedro Mulens (CUB)	1	4

=== Repechage ===
Two bronze medals were awarded.

Repechage Round 1	Repechage round 2		Bronze Medal Bout
			Glenn Garrison (USA)	1 0 1
			Vincente Huacon (ECU)	0 1 0
	Vincente Huacon (ECU)	3 0
Bye	Shawn Daye (CAN)	0 0
Shawn Daye (CAN)

Repechage round 1	Bronze Medal Bout
	Ulises Barragan (MEX)	3 3
Jefrin Mejia (HON)	Jefrin Mejia (HON)	0 0
Bye
