= Pedro Mulens =

Cuban wrestler (born 1985)

Pedro Muléns
Personal information
- Born: Pedro Isaac Muléns Herrera; 22 December 1985 (age 40) Camagüey, Cuba
- Height: 168 cm (5 ft 6 in)
Medal record
Men's Greco-Roman wrestling
Representing Cuba
Pan American Games
Gold medal – first place	2011 Guadalajara	66 kg
World Championships
Bronze medal – third place	2009 Herning	66 kg
Bronze medal – third place	2011 Istanbul	66 kg

Pedro Isaac Muléns Herrera (Note: In this Spanish name, the first or paternal surname is Muléns and the second or maternal family name is Herrera.) (born 22 December 1985, in Camagüey) is a male wrestler from Cuba. He competed in the men's -66 kg Greco-Roman division and represented Cuba at the 2012 Summer Olympics. In the men's Greco-Roman 66 kg event, Muléns was knocked out by eventual champion Kim Hyeon-woo in the main draw, before losing a bronze medal match to Steeve Guénot in the repechage.
