= Glenn Garrison =

American wrestler

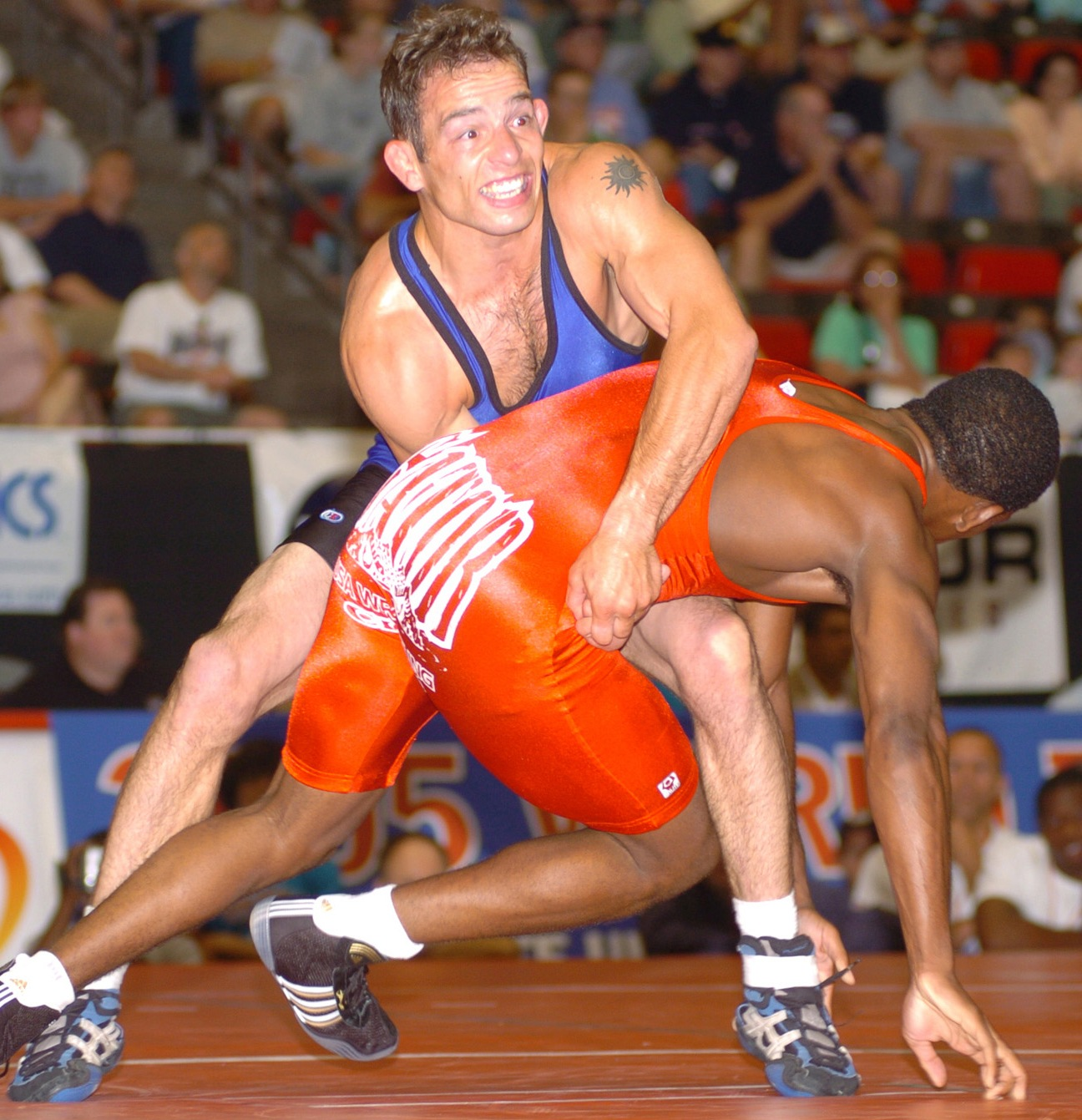
- Glenn Garrison (in blue) during match in 2005

Personal information
- Born: March 25, 1974 (age 52) Beaverton, Oregon, U.S.

Sport
- Country: United States
- Sport: Wrestling
- Events: Greco-Roman and Folkstyle
- Club: U.S. Army WCAP
- Team: USA
Medal record
Men's Greco-Roman wrestling
Representing the United States
Pan American Games
Bronze medal – third place	2011 Guadalajara	66 kg
Collegiate Wrestling
Representing Clackamas CC
NJCAA Championships
Gold medal – first place	1997 Bismark	142 lb
Silver medal – second place	1996 Bismark	142 lb
Representing Montana State–Northern
NAIA Championships
Gold medal – first place	1998 Primm	142 lb

Glenn Garrison (born March 25, 1974) is an American wrestler who won a bronze medal in the 66 kg Greco-Roman event at the 2011 Pan American Games. He was also third at the 2004 World Cup. Domestically, he held the 2007 and 2010 U.S. Open title, placing second in 2011, third in 2003, 2005, 2006, 2008 and 2012, and fourth in 2004 and 2009.

Garrison attended a high school in Beaverton, Oregon,. He placed second in the 1992 Oregon high school state championships, and won the 1997 Junior College national title for Clackamas Community College before winning a NAIA national title for Montana State-Northern in 1998.

After retiring from competitions he served as an assistant wrestling coach at NCAA Division II Western Colorado University.

Garrison is married to Joey. He has two stepchildren, Halsey and Jordan, and a grandson, Gage.
