= Hovhannes Varderesyan =

Armenian Greco-Roman wrestler

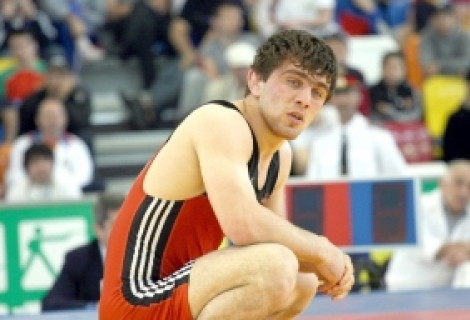

Personal information
- Born: 12 February 1989 (age 37) Yerevan, Armenia
- Height: 1.66 m (5 ft 5 1/2 in)
- Weight: 66 kg (146 lb)

Sport
- Sport: Wrestling
- Event: Greco-Roman
- Coached by: Armen Babalaryan

Hovhannes Varderesyan (Armenian: Հովհաննես Վարդերեսյան, born 12 February 1989) is an Armenian Greco-Roman wrestler.

He started wrestling in 1996. Varderesyan won a bronze medal at the 2006 Cadet European Championships and a bronze medal at the 2009 Junior World Championships.

Varderesyan was a member of the Armenian Greco-Roman wrestling team at the 2010 Wrestling World Cup. The Armenian team came in third place.

He competed at the 2012 Summer Olympics in the men's Greco-Roman 66 kg division. Varderesyan was defeated by eventual gold medalist Kim Hyeon-Woo.
