= Wrestling at the 2008 Summer Olympics – Men's Greco-Roman 66 kg =

Men's Greco-Roman 66 kg at the Games of the XXIX Olympiad
- Venue: China Agricultural University Gymnasium
- Date: 13 August 2008
- Competitors: 20 from 20 nations

Medalists
1st place, gold medalist(s)		Steeve Guénot	France
2nd place, silver medalist(s)		Kanatbek Begaliev	Kyrgyzstan
3rd place, bronze medalist(s)		Armen Vardanyan	Ukraine
3rd place, bronze medalist(s)		Mikhail Siamionau	Belarus

Men's Greco-Roman 66 kilograms competition at the 2008 Summer Olympics in Beijing, China, was held on August 13 at the China Agricultural University Gymnasium.

This Greco-Roman wrestling competition consists of a single-elimination tournament, with a repechage used to determine the winner of two bronze medals. The two finalists face off for gold and silver medals. Each wrestler who loses to one of the two finalists moves into the repechage, culminating in a pair of bronze medal matches featuring the semifinal losers each facing the remaining repechage opponent from their half of the bracket.

Each bout consists of up to three rounds, lasting two minutes apiece. The wrestler who scores more points in each round is the winner of that rounds; the bout ends when one wrestler has won two rounds (and thus the match).

== Schedule ==
All times are China Standard Time (UTC+08:00)

Date	Time	Event
13 August 2008	09:30	Qualification rounds
13 August 2008	16:00	Repechage
13 August 2008	17:00	Finals

== Results ==
=== Final ===
Final
Kanatbek Begaliev (KGZ)	0	1
Steeve Guénot (FRA)	3	3

=== Top half ===
Qualifications

1/8 finals
Jake Deitchler (USA)	0	3
Kanatbek Begaliev (KGZ)	6	3
Farid Mansurov (AZE)	0	0
Armen Vardanyan (UKR)	3	3
Mohamed Serir (ALG)	0	0
Sergey Kovalenko (RUS)	6	6
Şeref Eroğlu (TUR)	1	1
Nikolay Gergov (BUL)	1	2

Quarterfinals
Kanatbek Begaliev (KGZ)	3	0	2
Armen Vardanyan (UKR)	0	2	1
Sergey Kovalenko (RUS)	1	5	1
Nikolay Gergov (BUL)	2	2	3

Semifinals
Kanatbek Begaliev (KGZ)	1	1
Nikolay Gergov (BUL)	1	1

=== Bottom half ===
Qualifications
Mikhail Siamionau (BLR)	1	1
Aleksandr Kazakevič (LTU)	1	1
Kim Min-chul (KOR)	1	1
Ali Mohammadi (IRI)	1	1
Alain Milián (CUB)	0	1
Steeve Guénot (FRA)	3	2
Arman Adikyan (ARM)	2	1
Tamás Lőrincz (HUN)	2	2

1/8 finals
Li Yanyan (CHN)	2	1
Ion Panait (ROU)	2	1
Markus Thätner (GER)	1	1
Darkhan Bayakhmetov (KAZ)	2	3
Mikhail Siamionau (BLR)	2	0	1
Ali Mohammadi (IRI)	0	4	1
Steeve Guénot (FRA)	0	1	1
Tamás Lőrincz (HUN)	2	1	1

Quarterfinals
Li Yanyan (CHN)	1	4	1
Darkhan Bayakhmetov (KAZ)	4	2	5
Mikhail Siamionau (BLR)	1	1
Steeve Guénot (FRA)	2	1

Semifinals
Darkhan Bayakhmetov (KAZ)	1	0
Steeve Guénot (FRA)	1	3

=== Repechage ===
Repechage round 1
Alain Milián (CUB)	1	1
Tamás Lőrincz (HUN)	1	1

Repechage round 2
Jake Deitchler (USA)	1	3	1
Armen Vardanyan (UKR)	1	1	1
Alain Milián (CUB)	1	1
Mikhail Siamionau (BLR)	1	3

Bronze medals
Armen Vardanyan (UKR)	4	1	6
Nikolay Gergov (BUL)	1	2	1
Mikhail Siamionau (BLR)	2	1	1
Darkhan Bayakhmetov (KAZ)	0	1	1

== Final standing ==
Rank	Athlete
1st place, gold medalist(s)	Steeve Guénot (FRA)
2nd place, silver medalist(s)	Kanatbek Begaliev (KGZ)
3rd place, bronze medalist(s)	Armen Vardanyan (UKR)
3rd place, bronze medalist(s)	Mikhail Siamionau (BLR)
5	Nikolay Gergov (BUL)
5	Darkhan Bayakhmetov (KAZ)
7	Sergey Kovalenko (RUS)
8	Alain Milián (CUB)
9	Tamás Lőrincz (HUN)
10	Li Yanyan (CHN)
11	Ali Mohammadi (IRI)
12	Jake Deitchler (USA)
13	Ion Panait (ROU)
14	Arman Adikyan (ARM)
15	Aleksandr Kazakevič (LTU)
15	Kim Min-chul (KOR)
17	Şeref Eroğlu (TUR)
18	Markus Thätner (GER)
19	Farid Mansurov (AZE)
20	Mohamed Serir (ALG)
