= Tsutomu Fujimura =

Japanese Greco-Roman wrestler

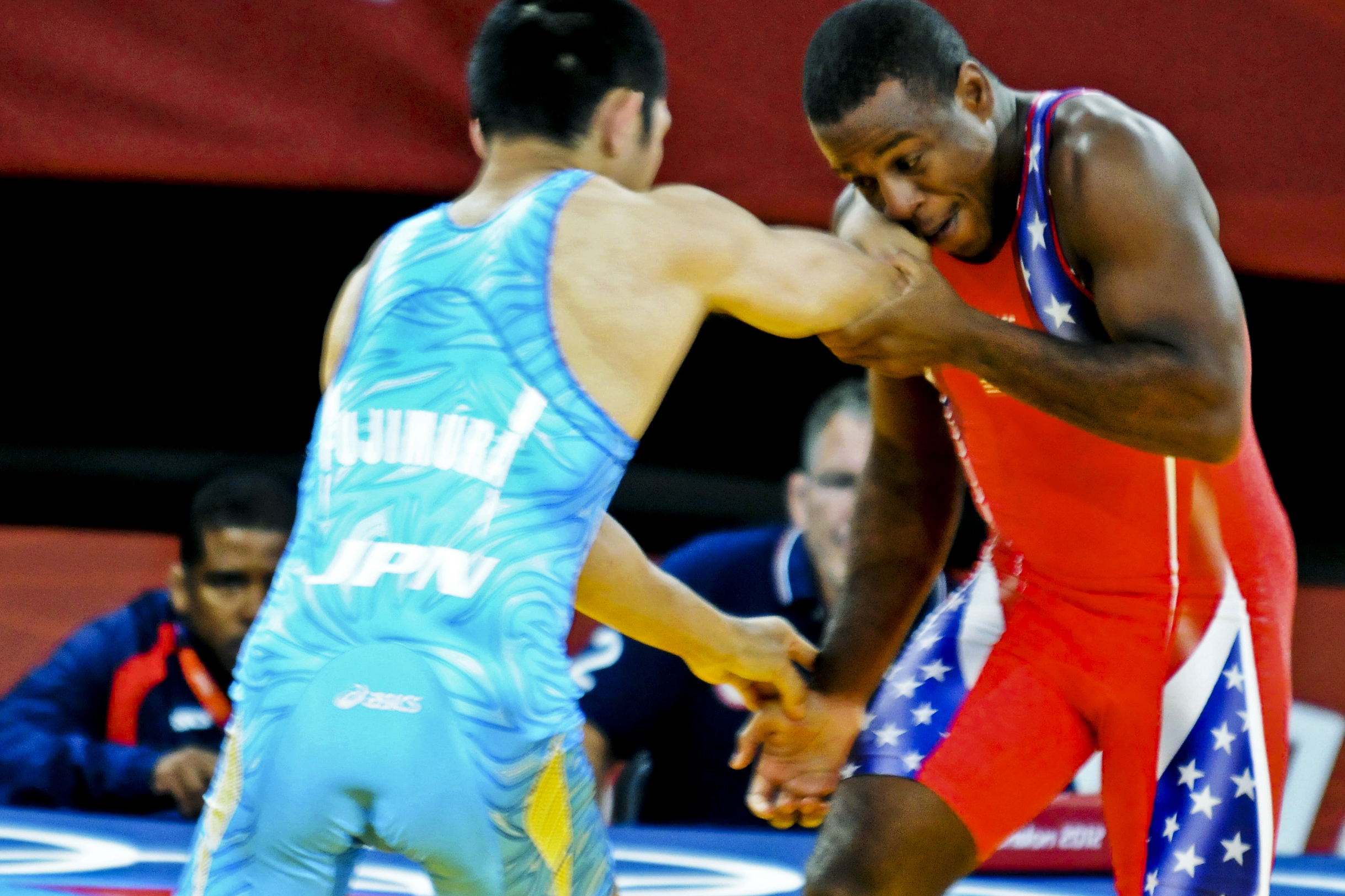
- r Spc. Justin Lester, right, grapples with Japan's Tsutomu Fujimura, 2011

Personal information
- Nationality: Japan
- Born: 28 March 1982 (age 44) Hikari, Yamaguchi, Japan
- Height: 1.74 m (5 ft 8 1/2 in)
- Weight: 66 kg (146 lb)

Sport
- Sport: Wrestling
- Event: Greco-Roman
- Club: The Self-Defence Forces of Japan
- Coached by: Masaki Iimuro
Medal record
Men's Greco-Roman wrestling
Representing Japan
Asian Games
Bronze medal – third place	2010 Guangzhou	66 kg

Tsutomu Fujimura (藤村 義, Fujimura Tsutomu; born March 28, 1982 in Hikari, Yamaguchi) is an amateur Japanese Greco-Roman wrestler, who competes in the men's welterweight category. He won a bronze medal in his weight category at the 2010 Asian Games in Guangzhou, China. Fujimura is a member of the wrestling team for The Self-Defence Forces of Japan, under his personal coach Masaki Iimuro, and also, an economics graduate at Tokuyama University.

Fujimura represented Japan at the 2012 Summer Olympics in London, where he competed for the men's 66 kg class. He received a bye for the preliminary round of sixteen match, before losing out to U.S. wrestler Justin Lester, who was able to score three points each in two straight periods, leaving Fujimura with only a single point.
