= Vasıf Arzumanov =

Turkish wrestler (born 1988)

Personal information
- Born: August 6, 1988 (age 38)
Medal record
Men's Greco-Roman wrestling
Representing Turkey
World Championships
Bronze medal – third place	2010 Moscow	66 kg

Vasıf Arzumanov (born August 6, 1988) is a Turkish retired wrestler with Azeri origin, who has won a bronze medal in the 2010 World Wrestling Championships, in his first senior championship. He is currently a PE teacher at 19 Mayıs Middle School, Büyükçekmece, Istanbul Province. He is known for both engagement with students and his discipline.

- 2010 World Championship – Bronze medal
  - Round 1: Bye
  - Round 2: Defeated Kanatbek Begaliev (KGZ), 2-1(0-2, 2–0, 1–0)
  - Round 3: Defeated Vladimir Pogudin (UZB), 2–1 (0-1, 2–0, 1–0)
  - Round 4: Defeated Emilian Todorov (BUL), 2–0 (1–0, 6–0)
  - Semifinal: Lost to Armen Vardanyan (UKR), 1-2 (1-0,1-2, 1-2)
  - 3rd Place: Defeated Sebastien Guenot (FRA), 2–0 (3–0, 2–0)
