= Manuchar Tskhadaia =

Georgian wrestler (born 1985)

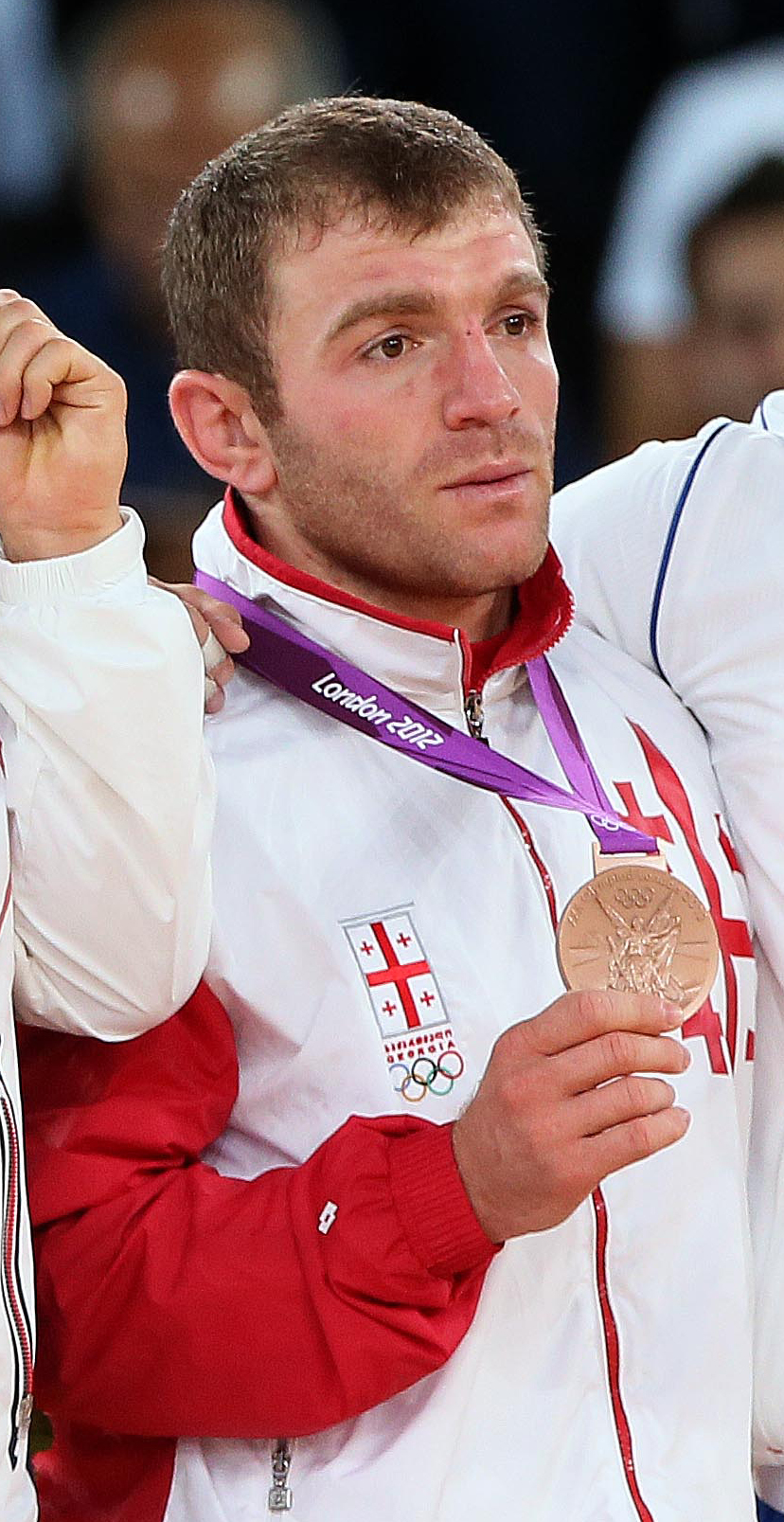
- Tskhadaia at the 2012 Summer Olympics

Medal record

Men's Greco-Roman wrestling

Representing Georgia

Olympic Games
Bronze medal – third place	2012 London	66 kg

World Championships
Silver medal – second place	2009 Herning	66 kg
Silver medal – second place	2011 Istanbul	66 kg

European Championships
Silver medal – second place	2012 Belgrade	74 kg
Bronze medal – third place	2009 Vilnius	66 kg

Manuchar Tskhadaia (მანუჩარ ცხადაია, born March 19, 1985) is a male wrestler from Georgia.

He won the bronze medal at the 2012 Summer Olympics in the men's Greco-Roman 66 kg category.
