= Darkhan Bayakhmetov =

Kazakh Greco-Roman wrestler

Personal information
- Full name: Darkhan Argynuly; Bayakhmetov
- Nationality: Kazakhstani
- Born: 21 August 1985 (age 41) Oskemen, Shygys Qazaqstan, Kazakh SSR, Soviet Union
- Height: 1.72 m (5 ft 7 1/2 in)
- Weight: 66 kg (146 lb)

Sport
- Sport: Wrestling
- Event: Greco-Roman
- Club: Dynamo Kazakhstan
- Coached by: Boranbek Konyratov
Medal record
Men's Greco-Roman wrestling
Representing Kazakhstan
Asian Games
Silver medal – second place	2010 Guangzhou	66 kg
Asian Championships
Gold medal – first place	2009 Pattaya	66 kg

Darkhan Argynovich Bayakhmetov (Kazakh: Дархан Арғынұлы Баяхметов, Darhan Arğynūly Baiahmetov; born August 21, 1985, in Oskemen, Shyrgys Qazaqstan) is an amateur Kazakh Greco-Roman wrestler, who played for the men's welterweight category. He won a gold medal for his division at the 2009 Asian Wrestling Championships in Pattaya, Thailand, and silver at the 2010 Asian Games in Guangzhou, China.

Bayakhmetov made his official debut for the 2008 Summer Olympics in Beijing, where he competed in the men's 66 kg class. He defeated Germany's Markus Thätner, and China's Li Yanyan in the preliminary rounds, before losing out the semi-final match to France's Steeve Guénot, who was able to score four points in two straight periods, leaving Bayakhmetov with a single point. Because his opponent advanced further into the final match, Bayakhmetov automatically qualified for the bronze medal bout, where he was defeated by Belarus' Mikhail Siamionau, with a three-set technical score (2–0, 1–1, 1–1), and a classification point score of 1–3.

At the 2012 Summer Olympics in London, Bayakhmetov lost the preliminary round of sixteen match of the men's 66 kg class to Lithuania's Edgaras Venckaitis, with a technical score of 2–6.
