= Orlando Huacón =

Ecuadorian Greco-Roman wrestler

Personal information
- Full name: Vicente Orlando Huacón Alvarado
- Nationality: Ecuador
- Born: 5 April 1989 (age 37) Guayaquil, Ecuador
- Height: 1.69 m (5 ft 6 1/2 in)
- Weight: 66 kg (146 lb)

Sport
- Sport: Wrestling
- Event: Greco-Roman

Vicente Orlando Huacón Alvarado (born 5 April 1989 in Guayaquil) is an amateur Greco-Roman wrestler from Ecuador. He competed for the 66 kg category (welterweight division) in men's Greco-Roman wrestling at the 2012 Summer Olympics in London, after winning the gold medal at the Pan American Qualification Tournament in Kissimmee, Florida, United States. Huacon was eliminated in the second qualifying round, against Egypt's Ashraf El-Gharably, with a technical score of 2–5, and a classification score of 1–3.
