= Arman Adikyan =

Armenian Greco-Roman wrestler (born 1984)

Personal information
- Born: 10 November 1984 (age 41) Vagharshapat, Armenia
- Height: 1.68 m (5 ft 6 in)
- Weight: 70 kg (150 lb)

Sport
- Sport: Wrestling
- Event: Greco-Roman
- Club: Urashai Abakan
- Coached by: Artur Tovmasyan
Medal record
Representing Armenia
Men's Greco-Roman wrestling
World Cup
Silver medal – second place	2010 Yerevan	66 kg

Arman Adikyan (Armenian: Արման Ադիկյան, born 10 November 1984) is an Armenian Greco-Roman wrestler.

He competed at the 2008 Summer Olympics in the men's Greco-Roman 66 kg division.

Adikyan was a member of the Armenian Greco-Roman wrestling team at the 2010 Wrestling World Cup. The Armenian team came in third place. Adikyan personally won a silver medal.
