= Markus Thätner =

German wrestler (born 1985)

Personal information
- Nationality: Germany
- Born: 11 February 1985 (age 41) Frankfurt an der Oder, Brandenburg, East Germany
- Height: 1.72 m (5 ft 7 1/2 in)
- Weight: 66 kg (146 lb)

Sport
- Sport: Wrestling
- Event: Greco-Roman
- Club: RSV Hansa 90 Frankfurt (Oder)
- Coached by: Jörn Levermann
Medal record
Men's Greco-Roman wrestling
Representing Germany
European Championships
Bronze medal – third place	2007 Sofia	66 kg

Markus Thätner (born February 11, 1985, in Frankfurt an der Oder, Brandenburg) is an amateur German Greco-Roman wrestler, who played for the men's welterweight category. He won a bronze medal for his division at the 2007 European Wrestling Championships in Sofia, Bulgaria.

Thatner represented Germany at the 2008 Summer Olympics in Beijing, where he competed for the men's 66 kg class. He received a bye for the preliminary round of sixteen match, before losing out to Kazakhstan's Darkhan Bayakhmetov, with a two-set technical score (1–2, 1–3), and a classification point score of 1–3.
