= Mohamed Serir =

Algerian Greco-Roman wrestler

Personal information
- Nationality: Algeria
- Born: 6 December 1984 (age 41) Algiers, Algeria
- Height: 1.75 m (5 ft 9 in)
- Weight: 66 kg (146 lb)

Sport
- Sport: Wrestling
- Event: Greco-Roman
- Club: Centre Arbee
- Coached by: Rabbah Chebbah

Mohamed Serir (Arabic: محمد سرير; born December 6, 1984, in Algiers) is an amateur Algerian Greco-Roman wrestler, who played for the men's welterweight category. He won two medals (gold and silver) for his division at the African Wrestling Championships (2008 in Tunis, Tunisia, and 2009 in Casablanca, Morocco).

Serir made his official debut for the 2008 Summer Olympics in Beijing, where he competed for the men's 66 kg class. He received a bye for the preliminary round of sixteen match, before losing out to Russia's Sergey Kovalenko, who was able to score six points each in two straight periods, leaving Serir without a single point.

At the 2012 Summer Olympics in London, Serir lost the qualifying round match to Lithuania's Edgaras Venckaitis, with a three-set technical score (0–5, 1–0, 0–1), and a classification point score of 1–3.
