= Ion Panait =

Romanian Greco-Roman wrestler

Personal information
- Full name: Ion Iulian Panait
- Nationality: Romania
- Born: 5 May 1981 (age 45) Mizil, Romania
- Height: 1.69 m (5 ft 6 1/2 in)
- Weight: 66 kg (146 lb)

Sport
- Sport: Wrestling
- Event: Greco-Roman
- Club: Dinamo București
- Coached by: Carare Petrica
Medal record
Men's Greco-Roman wrestling
Representing Romania
European Championships
Silver medal – second place	2008 Tampere	66 kg
Silver medal – second place	2010 Baku	66 kg

Ion Iulian Panait (born May 5, 1981 in Mizil) is an amateur Romanian Greco-Roman wrestler, who competed for the men's welterweight category. He won two silver medals for his division at the 2008 European Wrestling Championships in Tampere, Finland, and at the 2010 European Wrestling Championships in Baku, Azerbaijan. He is also a member of Dinamo București and is coached and trained by Carare Petrica.

Panait represented Romania at the 2008 Summer Olympics in Beijing, where he competed in the men's 66 kg class. He received a bye for the second preliminary round, before being defeated by China's Li Yanyan, with a technical score of 3–3 and a classification score of 1–3.
