= Pascal Strebel =

Swiss Olympic wrestler

Personal information
- Born: 26 December 1988 (age 37) Muri
- Height: 1.76 m (5 ft 9 1/2 in)
- Weight: 66 kg (146 lb)

Sport
- Country: Switzerland
- Sport: Wrestling
- Event: Greco-Roman -66kg
- Club: Ringerstaffel Freiamt, Aristau
- Coached by: Andrei Maltsev, Kurt Haas, Volker Hirt

Pascal Strebel (born 26 December 1988 in Muri) is a Swiss Greco-Roman wrestler. He competed in the -66kg event at the 2012 Summer Olympics in London, where he was eliminated in the first round.
