= Saeid Abdevali =

Iranian wrestler (born 1989)

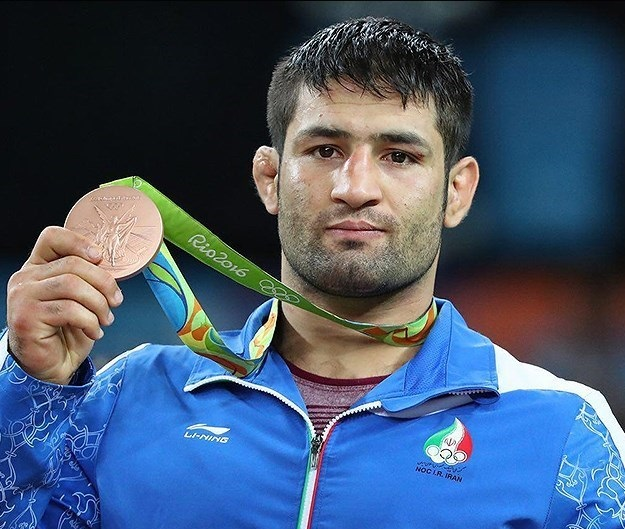
- Saeid Abdevali at the 2016 Summer Olympics

Personal information
- Native name: سعید عبدولی
- Full name: Saeid Abdevali
- Nickname: spirit bomb
- Nationality: Iranian
- Born: 4 November 1989 (age 36) Andimeshk, Iran
- Height: 1.70 m (5 ft 7 in)
- Weight: 70 kg (154 lb)
Medal record
Men's Greco-Roman wrestling
Representing Iran
Olympic Games
Bronze medal – third place	2016 Rio de Janeiro	75 kg
World Championships
Gold medal – first place	2011 Istanbul	66 kg
Bronze medal – third place	2017 Paris	75 kg
Bronze medal – third place	2019 Nur-Sultan	82 kg
Asian Games
Gold medal – first place	2010 Guangzhou	66 kg
Bronze medal – third place	2014 Incheon	71 kg
Asian Championships
Gold medal – first place	2019 Xi'an	82 kg
Bronze medal – third place	2009 Pattaya	66 kg
Bronze medal – third place	2014 Astana	75 kg

Saeid Mourad Abdevali (Persian: سعيد عبدولى, born 4 November 1989) is an Iranian wrestler. He is a two-time world junior champion in Greco-Roman wrestling, 2011 senior world champion and won the bronze medal at the 2016 Olympics. He was born in Andimeshk.

Abdevali won the 2011 World Championships to clinch his spot at the Olympics in London. Abdevali also won the 2010 Asian Games and the World Cup in 2010 and 2011. This success followed his junior career, where he won the World Championship in 2008 and 2009 and was the Asian Junior champion in 2008. He also won two bronze medals at the Asian junior championships before moving to the senior level in 2010. He is the cousin of Mehdi Shiri (footballer, born 1991), the Iranian football player who plays for FC Persepolis.

== London 2012 Olympics ==
Despite being tipped to take the gold medal, Abdevali was eliminated in the London 2012 Olympics by French wrestler Steeve Guenot.

== Asian Games 2014 ==
In the semi-final stage of the 2014 Asian Games, Abdevali executed 5 to appear to pin his opponent Korean Wrestler Jung Ji-hyun, and was initially announced by the referee as the winner. The Korean coach protested, and the referee revised the decision. Eventually, Abdevali lost the match 6–9 to his opponent.

== 2016 Olympics ==
At the 2016 Olympics, Abdevali competed at middleweight (75 kg). Abdevali lost to Mark Madsen in the second round. As Madsen reached the final, Abdevali was entered into the repechage. There he beat Viktor Nemeš and then Péter Bácsi to win a bronze medal.
