= Mikhail Siamionau =

Belarusian wrestler (born 1984)

Medal record

Men's Greco Roman wrestling

Representing Belarus

Olympic Games
Bronze medal – third place	2008 Beijing	66 kg

Mikhail Uladzimiravich Siamionau (Belarusian: Міхаіл Сямёнаў) (born 30 July 1984 in Minsk) is a Belarusian wrestler.

Siamionau won a bronze medal in men's Greco-Roman wrestling in the 66 kg (146 lb) category at the 2008 Beijing Olympic Games.
