= Justin Lester (wrestler) =

American Greco-Roman wrestler

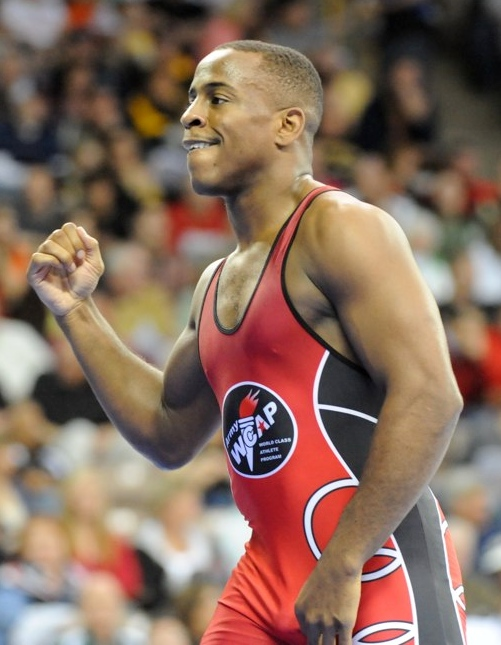
- Justin Lester in 2012

Personal information
- Born: September 30, 1983 (age 42) Akron, Ohio, U.S.
- Height: 5 ft 7 in (170 cm)
- Weight: 66 kg (146 lb)
Medal record
Representing United States
Men's Greco-Roman wrestling
World Championships
| Bronze medal – third place | 2006 Guangzhou | 66 kg |
| Bronze medal – third place | 2007 Baku | 66 kg |
University World Championships
| Bronze medal – third place | 2005 Izmir | 66 kg |
World Military Games
| Silver medal – second place | 2015 Mungyeong | 75 kg |
Pan American Games
| Gold medal – first place | 2007 Rio de Janeiro | 66 kg |
Men's freestyle wrestling
Cadet World Championships
| Gold medal – first place | 1999 Lodz | 54 kg |

Justin "Harry" Lester (born September 30, 1983) is an American former Greco-Roman wrestler. He who won bronze medals at the 2006 and 2007 World Championships. He was also a member of the 2007 United States Greco-Roman World Champion Team. Lester competed at the 2012 Olympics and finished in seventh place.

In April 2019, Lester was placed on unpaid administrative leave from his position as a wrestling coach at St. Vincent-St. Mary High School following allegations of a sexual relationship with a high school student Lester coached. The student was 18-19 years old at the time of the incident. In July 2019, Lester was charged with sexual battery, a third degree felony. The charges were later reduced and he was sentenced to probation.
