= Ambako Vachadze =

Russian wrestler (born 1983)

Personal information
- Full name: Ambako Avtandilovich Vachadze
- Born: 17 March 1983 (age 43) Kutaisi, Georgia
- Height: 164 cm (5 ft 5 in)
Medal record
Men's Greco-Roman wrestling
Representing Russia
World Championships
Bronze medal – third place	2009 Herning	66 kg
Gold medal – first place	2010 Moscow	66 kg
European Championships
Gold medal – first place	2009 Vilnius	66 kg
Gold medal – first place	2010 Baku	66 kg
Gold medal – first place	2011 Dortmund	66 kg

Ambako Avtandilovich Vachadze (Georgian: ვაჩაძე ამბაკო, Russian: Амбако Автандилович Вачадзе; born 17 March 1983 in Kutaisi) is a Georgian male Greco-Roman wrestler who competes for Russia.
