= Edgaras Venckaitis =

Lithuanian wrestler (born 1985)

Medal record

Men's Greco-Roman wrestling

Representing Lithuania

World Championships
Bronze medal – third place	2014 Tashkent	66 kg

Edgaras Venckaitis (born 12 December 1985 in Tauragė) is a Lithuanian wrestler, who competes in the men's 66 kg Greco-Roman division.

He has competed at the 2012 Summer Olympics where he finished 7th. He lost to eventual champion Kim Hyeon-woo in the main draw and then to Pedro Mulens in the repechage. In 2014 Venckaitis won the bronze medal at the World Championships.
