= Kim Hyeon-woo =

South Korean wrestler (born 1988)

Personal information
- Nationality: South Korea
- Born: November 6, 1988 (age 38) Wonju, Gangwon Province
- Height: 174 cm (5 ft 9 in)

Sport
- Country: South Korea
- Sport: Wrestling
- Weight class: 66–77 kg
- Event: Greco-Roman
Medal record
Men's Greco-Roman wrestling
Representing South Korea
Olympic Games
Gold medal – first place	2012 London	66 kg
Bronze medal – third place	2016 Rio de Janeiro	75 kg
World Championships
Gold medal – first place	2013 Budapest	74 kg
Bronze medal – third place	2018 Budapest	77 kg
Bronze medal – third place	2011 Istanbul	66 kg
Asian Games
Gold medal – first place	2014 Incheon	74 kg
Bronze medal – third place	2018 Jakarta	77 kg
Asian Championships
Gold medal – first place	2010 New Delhi	66 kg
Gold medal – first place	2013 New Delhi	74 kg
Gold medal – first place	2014 Astana	74 kg
Gold medal – first place	2015 Doha	74 kg

Korean name
- Hangul: 김현우
- Hanja: 金炫雨
- RR: Gim Hyeonu
- MR: Kim Hyŏnu
- IPA: kim.ɦjʌn.u

Kim Hyeon-woo (Korean: 김현우, Korean pronunciation: [kim.ɦjʌn.u]; born November 6, 1988, in Wonju, Gangwon Province) is a male wrestler from South Korea. In the 2012 Summer Olympics, Kim won the gold medal in the 66 kg Greco-Roman wrestling final.

== Biography ==
Kim began to train in judo at the age of 9. However, he switched to wrestling in 2001.

Kim first drew international attention in 2006 when he won the silver medal at the World Junior Wrestling Championships and the gold medal at the Asian Junior Wrestling Championships. Kim became a member of the South Korean senior national team in 2010 when he won the gold medal at the Asian Wrestling Championships.

At the 2011 World Wrestling Championships, Kim won bronze for his first medal at a major competition. In the quarterfinal bout, he beat 2008 Olympic silver medalist Vitaliy Rahimov of Azerbaijan 2–0. In December 2011, Kim won the gold medal in the men's Greco-Roman 66 kg at the Pre-London Olympics Test Event.

At the 2012 Olympics, Kim edged out defending Olympic champion Steeve Guenot of France 2–1 in the semifinals. In the final, Kim beat Tamás Lőrincz of Hungary with 2-0 (1:0, 2:0) to give South Korea its first wrestling gold of the London Games.

At the 2016 Summer Olympics, Kim was defeated by Roman Vlasov of Russia in the round of 16 in the 75 kg division. He then defeated Yang Bin of China during the repechages and Božo Starčević of Croatia to win the bronze medal. He was the flag bearer for South Korea during the closing ceremony.

He competed in the 77 kg event at the 2022 World Wrestling Championships held in Belgrade, Serbia.

== Honours ==
In 2024, at the 62nd Korea Sports Awards, Kim received the Cheongnyong Medal, the highest class of the Order of Sport Merit, which is awarded to individuals for outstanding achievements in sports.
