= Steeve Guénot =

French Greco-Roman wrestler

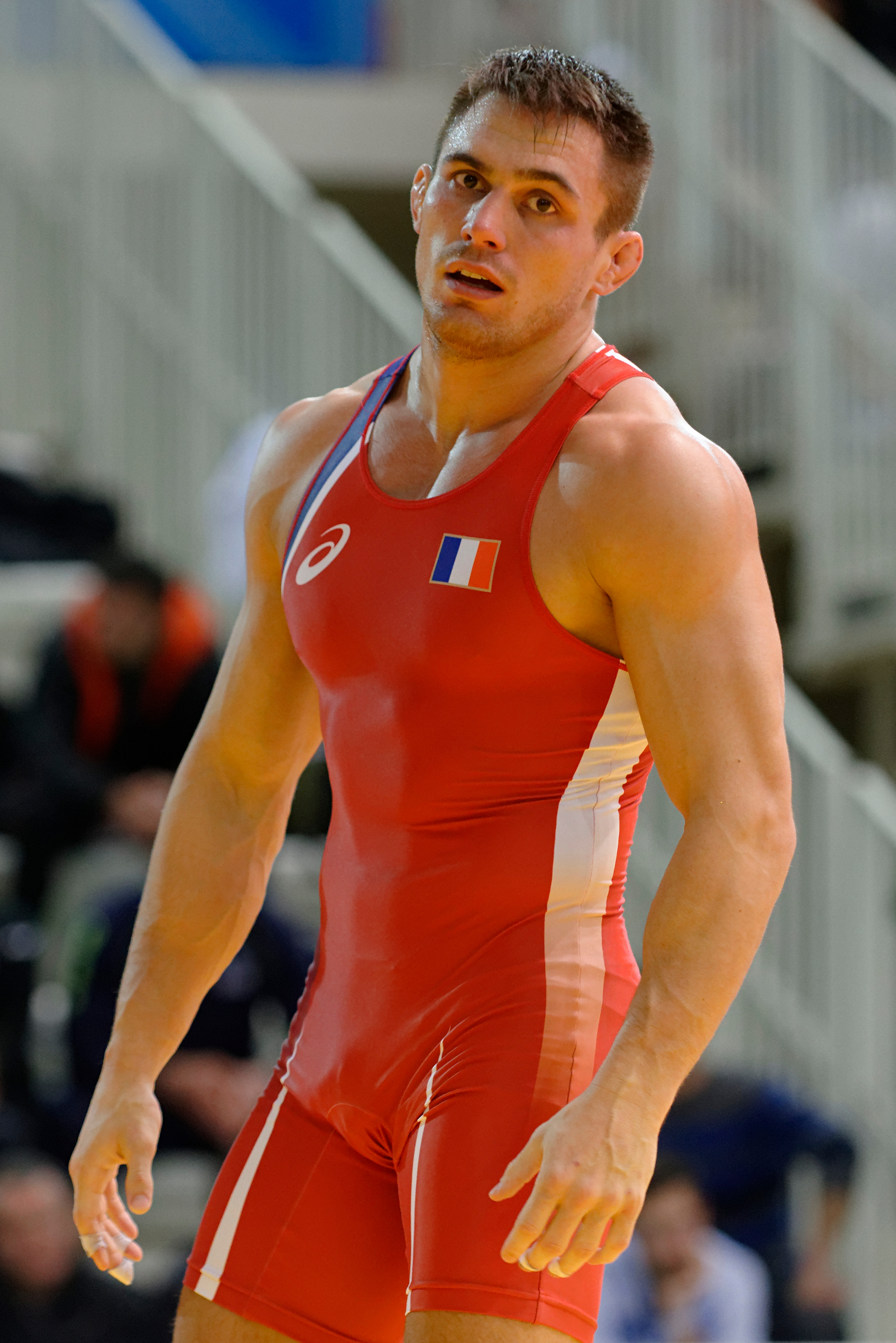
- Guénot at the 2014 Grand Prix of Paris

Personal information
- Born: 2 October 1985 (age 41) Chalon-sur-Saône, Saône-et-Loire, France

Sport
- Country: France
- Sport: Wrestling
- Event: Greco-Roman
Medal record
Men's Greco-Roman wrestling
Representing France
Olympic Games
Gold medal – first place	2008 Beijing	66 kg
Bronze medal – third place	2012 London	66 kg
World Championship
Silver medal – second place	Baku 2007	66 kg
European Championships
Bronze medal – third place	2010 Baku	66 kg

Steeve François Fabien Guénot (French: [stiv ɡeno]; born 2 October 1985) is a French wrestler who won the gold medal in the Men's Greco-Roman 66 kg in the 2008 Summer Olympics in Beijing. He became the first Olympic Champion for France in Men's Greco-Roman Wrestling since Emile Poilvé, in the 1936 Olympic Games in Berlin. Hired by the RATP in 2007, he is member of the US Métro (Union sportive métropolitaine des transports).

He is born in a family of wrestlers: his father is a referee and his mother is a club manager. His brother Christophe and sisters also practice wrestling.

At the age of 22, he gave France its first gold medal at the 2008 Summer Olympics.

At the 2012 Summer Olympics, he attempted to defend his gold medal. In the quarter-finals, he was declared the winner against the reigning world champion, Saeid Abdevali of Iran, in what was widely regarded as a controversial decision by the referee and judges. Guénot, however, was defeated in the semifinal by the eventual champion and ended up winning the bronze medal.

His brother, Christophe Guénot, also won a bronze medal in the -74 kg category.
