= Fencing at the 2012 Summer Olympics =

Coordinates: 51.5075°N 0.0297°E

Fencing at the Games of the XXX Olympiad
- Venue: ExCeL Exhibition Centre
- Dates: 28 July – 5 August 2012
- Competitors: 204 from 44 nations

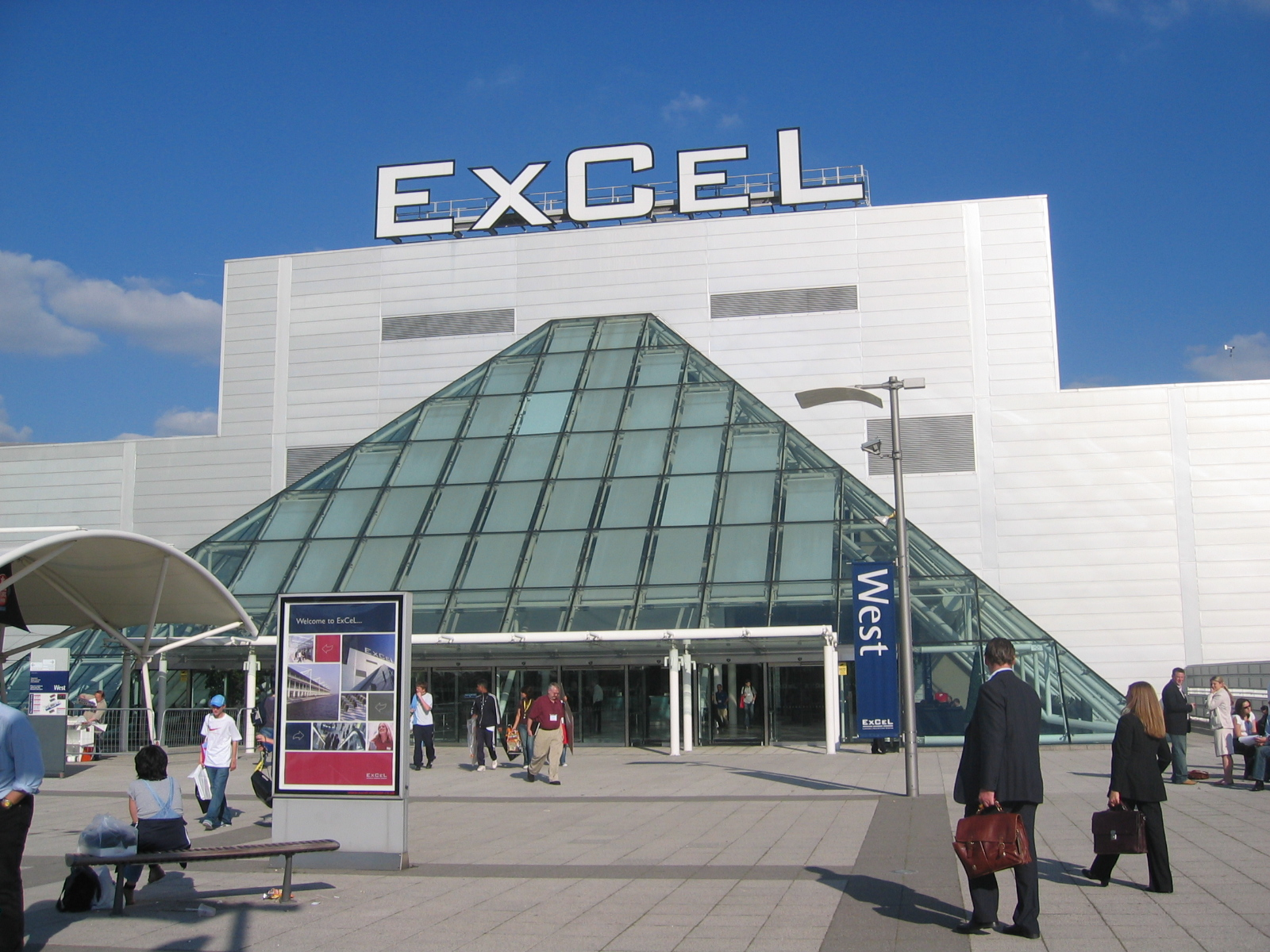
ExCeL Exhibition Centre hosted the fencing.

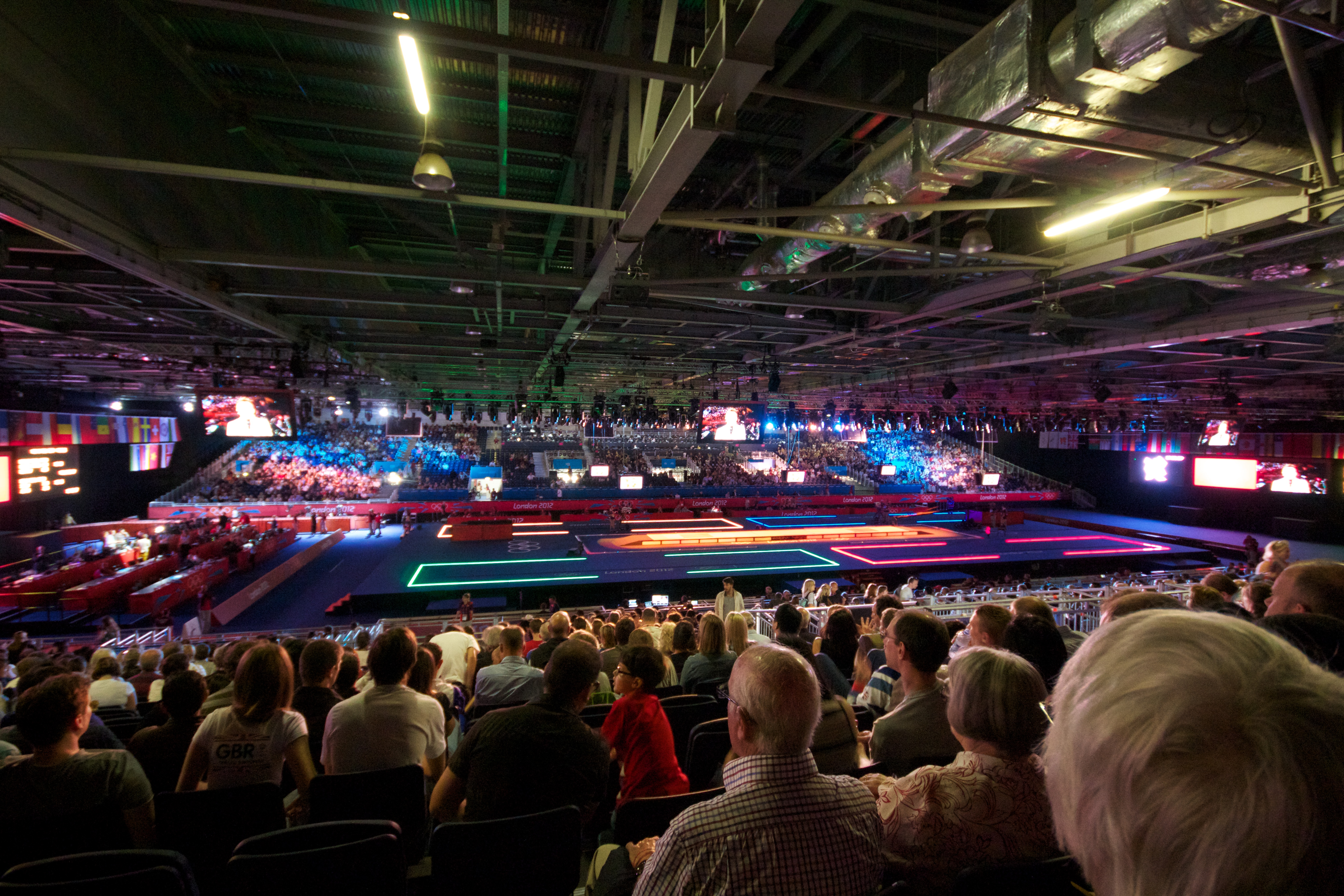

The fencing competitions at the 2012 Olympic Games in London were held from 28 July to 5 August at the ExCeL Exhibition Centre. Ten events (six individual, four team) were contested. The International Fencing Federation (FIE) had pushed for the inclusion of two more team events, but the International Olympic Committee voted to keep the format at ten events.

The women's individual épée semi final became a notable controversy at the 2012 Olympics when a time-keeping error by a games volunteer helped German Britta Heidemann beat South Korea's Shin A-lam. Despite there being two hundredths of a second remaining in the match, the timer could only be reset to a whole second after the mistake. The extra time was enough for the German to score a winning attack and proceed to the final.

== Qualification ==
Qualification was primarily based on the ind. official rankings as at 2 April 2012, with further individual places available at four zonal qualifying tournaments.

== Medal table ==
Rank	Nation	Gold	Silver	Bronze	Total
1	Italy	3	2	2	7
2	South Korea	2	1	3	6
3	China	2	0	1	3
4	Ukraine	1	0	1	2
5	Hungary	1	0	0	1
5	Venezuela	1	0	0	1
7	Russia	0	2	1	3
8	Germany	0	1	1	2
9	Egypt	0	1	0	1
9	Japan	0	1	0	1
9	Norway	0	1	0	1
9	Romania	0	1	0	1
13	United States	0	0	1	1
Totals (13 entries)		10	10	10	30

Despite fencing being its top medal-producing sport, France did not win any medal for the first time since 1960.

== Events ==
=== Men's ===
Games	Gold	Silver	Bronze
Individual épée	Rubén Limardo; Venezuela	Bartosz Piasecki; Norway	Jung Jin-sun; South Korea
Individual foil	Lei Sheng; China	Alaaeldin Abouelkassem; Egypt	Choi Byung-chul; South Korea
Team foil	Italy; Valerio Aspromonte; Giorgio Avola; Andrea Baldini; Andrea Cassarà	Japan; Suguru Awaji; Kenta Chida; Ryo Miyake; Yuki Ota	Germany; Peter Joppich; Sebastian Bachmann; Benjamin Kleibrink; André Weßels
Individual sabre	Áron Szilágyi; Hungary	Diego Occhiuzzi; Italy	Nikolay Kovalev; Russia
Team sabre	South Korea; Gu Bon-gil; Won Woo-young; Kim Jung-hwan; Oh Eun-seok	Romania; Rareș Dumitrescu; Tiberiu Dolniceanu; Florin Zalomir; Alexandru Sirițeanu	Italy; Aldo Montano; Diego Occhiuzzi; Luigi Samele; Luigi Tarantino

=== Women's ===
Games	Gold	Silver	Bronze
Individual épée	Yana Shemyakina; Ukraine	Britta Heidemann; Germany	Sun Yujie; China
Team épée	China; Sun Yujie; Xu Anqi; Li Na; Luo Xiaojuan	South Korea; Shin A-lam; Choi In-jeong; Jung Hyo-jung; Choi Eun-sook	United States; Courtney Hurley; Kelley Hurley; Maya Lawrence; Susie Scanlan
Individual foil	Elisa Di Francisca; Italy	Arianna Errigo; Italy	Valentina Vezzali; Italy
Team foil	Italy; Arianna Errigo; Elisa Di Francisca; Ilaria Salvatori; Valentina Vezzali	Russia; Inna Deriglazova; Larisa Korobeynikova; Aida Shanaeva; Kamilla Gafurzianova	South Korea; Nam Hyun-hee; Jeon Hee-sook; Jung Gil-ok; Oh Ha-na
Individual sabre	Kim Ji-yeon; South Korea	Sofiya Velikaya; Russia	Olha Kharlan; Ukraine
