= South Korea at the 2012 Summer Olympics =

- IOC code: KOR
- NOC: Korean Olympic Committee
- Website: www.sports.or.kr (in Korean and English)

in London
- Competitors: 248 in 22 sports
- Flag bearers: Yoon Kyung-shin (opening); Song Dae-nam (closing)
- Medals Ranked 5th: Gold 13 Silver 9 Bronze 9 Total 31

Summer Olympics appearances (overview)
- 1948; 1952; 1956; 1960; 1964; 1968; 1972; 1976; 1980; 1984; 1988; 1992; 1996; 2000; 2004; 2008; 2012; 2016; 2020; 2024

South Korea (officially the Republic of Korea) competed at the 2012 Summer Olympics in London, from July 27 to August 12, 2012. This was the nation's sixteenth appearance at the Olympics, having missed the 1980 Summer Olympics in Moscow because of its support for the United States boycott. The Korean Olympic Committee sent the nation's smallest delegation to the Games since 1992. A total of 248 athletes, 135 men and 113 women, competed in 22 sports.

South Korea left London with a total of 30 medals (13 gold, 9 silver, and 8 bronze), finishing fifth in the medal standings and tying its record for the most gold medals won at an Olympics with the total it set at Beijing. Six of these medals were awarded to the team in fencing, five in shooting, four in archery, and three in judo. South Korean athletes dominated in archery, where they won gold medals in all but one sporting events and broke two world records. Despite the absence of baseball and softball at the Olympics, South Korea's proved successful in team sports at London, as the men's football team won the bronze medal following a match against neighbouring Japan. For the first time in its history, South Korea won Olympic medals in team fencing.

Among the nation's medalists were pistol shooter Jin Jong-oh, and taekwondo jin Hwang Kyung-seon, who both successfully defended their Olympic titles from Beijing. Three South Korean athletes won Olympic gold medals for the first time in history: gymnast Yang Hak-seon in the men's vault exercises, archer Oh Jin-hyek in the men's individual event, and sabre fencer Kim Ji-yeon in the women's individual event. Park Tae-hwan, who won two silver medals in London, emerged as the most successful South Korean swimmer in history, with a total of four Olympic medals.

== Medalists ==
Medal	Name	Sport	Event	Date
Gold	Jin Jong-oh	Shooting	Men's 10 m air pistol	28 July
Gold	Lee Sung-jin; Ki Bo-bae; Choi Hyun-joo	Archery	Women's team	29 July
Gold	Kim Jae-bum	Judo	Men's 81 kg	31 July
Gold	Kim Jang-mi	Shooting	Women's 25 m pistol	1 August
Gold	Song Dae-nam	Judo	Men's 90 kg	1 August
Gold	Kim Ji-yeon	Fencing	Women's sabre	1 August
Gold	Ki Bo-bae	Archery	Women's individual	2 August
Gold	Oh Jin-hyek	Archery	Men's individual	3 August
Gold	Gu Bon-gil; Won Woo-young; Kim Jung-hwan; Oh Eun-seok	Fencing	Men's team sabre	3 August
Gold	Jin Jong-oh	Shooting	Men's 50 m pistol	5 August
Gold	Yang Hak-seon	Gymnastics	Men's vault	6 August
Gold	Kim Hyeon-woo	Wrestling	Men's Greco-Roman 66 kg	7 August
Gold	Hwang Kyung-seon	Taekwondo	Women's 67kg	10 August
Silver	Park Tae-hwan	Swimming	Men's 400 m freestyle	28 July
Silver	Park Tae-hwan	Swimming	Men's 200 m freestyle	30 July
Silver	Choi In-jeong; Shin A-lam; Jung Hyo-jung; Choi Eun-sook	Fencing	Women's team épée	4 August
Silver	Choi Young-rae	Shooting	Men's 50 m pistol	5 August
Silver	Kim Jong-hyun	Shooting	Men's 50 m rifle 3 positions	6 August
Silver	Joo Se-hyuk; Oh Sang-eun; Ryu Seung-min	Table tennis	Men's team	8 August
Silver	Lee Dae-hoon	Taekwondo	Men's 58 kg	8 August
Silver	Han Soon-chul	Boxing	Men's lightweight	12 August
Silver	Kim Min-jae	Weightlifting	Men's 94 kg	4 August
Bronze	Jang Mi-ran	Weightlifting	Women's +75 kg	5 August
Bronze	Im Dong-hyun; Kim Bub-min; Oh Jin-hyek	Archery	Men's team	28 July
Bronze	Cho Jun-ho	Judo	Men's 66 kg	29 July
Bronze	Choi Byung-chul	Fencing	Men's foil	31 July
Bronze	Jung Jin-sun	Fencing	Men's épée	1 August
Bronze	Nam Hyun-hee; Jung Gil-ok; Jeon Hee-sook; Oh Ha-na	Fencing	Women's team foil	2 August
Bronze	Jung Jae-sung; Lee Yong-dae	Badminton	Men's doubles	5 August
Bronze	Jeon Sang-guen	Weightlifting	Men's +105 kg	7 August
Bronze	South Korea national football team: Jung Sung-ryong; Oh Jae-suk; Yun Suk-young; Kim Young-gwon; Kim Kee-hee; Ki Sung-yueng; Kim Bo-kyung; Baek Sung-dong; Ji Dong-won; Park Chu-young; Nam Tae-hee; Hwang Seok-ho; Koo Ja-cheol; Kim Chang-soo; Park Jong-woo; Jung Woo-young; Kim Hyun-sung; Lee Bum-young	Football	Men's tournament	10 August

Medals by sport
Sport	1st place, gold medalist(s)	2nd place, silver medalist(s)	3rd place, bronze medalist(s)	Total
Shooting	3	2	0	5
Archery	3	0	1	4
Fencing	2	1	3	6
Judo	2	0	1	3
Taekwondo	1	1	0	2
Gymnastics	1	0	0	1
Wrestling	1	0	0	1
Swimming	0	2	0	2
Weightlifting	0	1	2	3
Boxing	0	1	0	1
Table tennis	0	1	0	1
Badminton	0	0	1	1
Football	0	0	1	1
Total	13	9	9	31

== Delegation ==
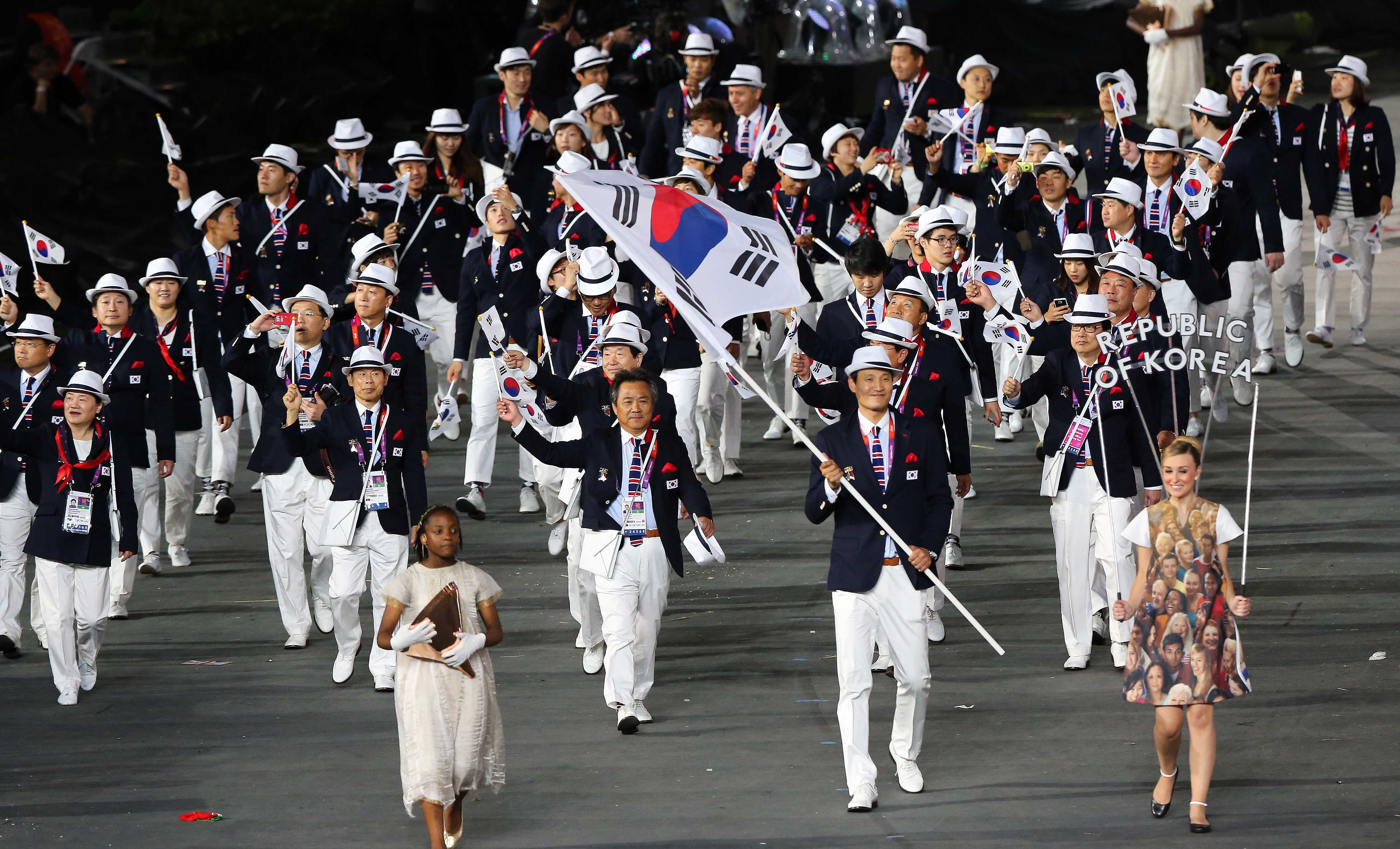
The South Korean Olympic delegation participating in the opening ceremony at the 2012 Summer Olympics.

The Korean Olympic Committee (KOC) selected a team of 245 athletes, 133 men and 112 women, to compete in 24 sports; it was the nation's smallest team sent to the Olympics since 1992. South Korea athletes did not qualify in basketball, canoeing, equestrian, and tennis. There was only a single competitor in rhythmic gymnastics, and in triathlon.

The South Korean team featured nine defending champions from Beijing, including freestyle swimmer Park Tae-hwan, the men's archery team (led by Im Dong-hyun), pistol shooter Jin Jong-oh, weightlifters Jang Mi-ran and Sa Jae-hyouk, and taekwondo jins Hwang Kyung-seon and Cha Dong-min. Among these champions, Jin Jong-oh only managed to defend his Olympic title for the second consecutive time. Handball player Yoon Kyung-shin, who competed at his fifth Olympics since 1992 (except the 1996 Summer Olympics in Atlanta, where his team did not qualify), was the oldest athlete of the team, at age 39, and later became South Korea's flag bearer at the opening ceremony. Platform diver Kim Su-ji, on the other hand, was the youngest of the team, at age 14.

Other notable South Korean athletes featured judoka and top medal contenders Wang Ki-chun and Kim Jae-bum, foil fencer and Olympic silver medalist Nam Hyun-hee, and butterfly swimmer and Youth Olympic gold medalist Chang Gyu-cheol.

The following table lists the number of South Korean competitors who participated in each Olympic sport. Note that swimming, synchronized swimming, diving and water polo are technically considered as one sport, aquatics. However, due to their significant practical differences, they are listed separately by tradition.

Sport	Men	Women	Total
Archery	3	3	6
Athletics	11	6	17
Badminton	6	6	12
Boxing	2	0	2
Cycling	6	4	10
Diving	1	1	2
Fencing	7	10	17
Field hockey	16	16	32
Football	18	0	18
Gymnastics	5	2	7
Handball	14	14	28
Judo	7	7	14
Modern pentathlon	2	1	3
Rowing	1	3	4
Sailing	4	0	4
Shooting	7	6	13
Swimming	6	9	15
Synchronized swimming	–	2	2
Table tennis	3	3	6
Taekwondo	2	2	4
Triathlon	1	0	1
Volleyball	0	12	12
Weightlifting	6	4	10
Wrestling	7	2	9
Total	135	113	248

== Archery ==
South Korea has qualified three archers for the men's individual event, three archers for the women's individual event, a team for the men's team event and a team for the women's team event

Men

Athlete	Event	Ranking round		Round of 64	Round of 32	Round of 16	Quarterfinals	Semifinals	Final / BM	
Athlete	Event	Score	Seed	Opposition Score	Opposition Score	Opposition Score	Opposition Score	Opposition Score	Opposition Score	Rank
Im Dong-hyun	Individual	699 WR	1	Guidi (SMR) (64); W 6–0	Wang C-P (TPE) (33); W 6–4	van der Ven (NED) (16); L 1–7	Did not advance			
Kim Bub-min	Individual	698	2	Elder (FIJ) (63); W 6–4	Rai (IND) (31); W 6–2	Olaru (MDA) (47); W 7–1	Dai Xx (CHN) (7); L 5–6	Did not advance		
Oh Jin-hyek	Individual	690	3	Müller (SUI) (62); W 7–3	Álvarez (MEX) (30); W 6–4	Dobrowolski (POL) (14); W 6–0	Ruban (UKR) (43); W 7–1	Dai Xx (CHN) (7); W 6–5	Furukawa (JPN) (5); W 7–1	1st place, gold medalist(s)
Im Dong-hyun; Kim Bub-min; Oh Jin-hyek	Team	2087 WR	1	—N/a		Bye	Ukraine (9); W 227–220	United States (4); L 219–224	Mexico (7); W 224–219	3rd place, bronze medalist(s)

Women

Athlete	Event	Ranking round		Round of 64	Round of 32	Round of 16	Quarterfinals	Semifinals	Final / BM	
Athlete	Event	Score	Seed	Opposition Score	Opposition Score	Opposition Score	Opposition Score	Opposition Score	Opposition Score	Rank
Choi Hyun-joo	Individual	651	21	Tomasi (ITA) (44); W 6–5	Grandal (ESP) (53); W 6–5	Schuh (FRA) (37); L 5–6	Did not advance			
Ki Bo-bae	Individual	671	1	Al-Mashhadani (IRQ) (64); W 6–0	Timofeyeva (BLR) (33); W 6–2	Hayakawa (JPN) (16); W 6–0	Perova (RUS) (9); W 6–4	Lorig (USA) (4); W 6–2	Román (MEX) (11); W 6–5	1st place, gold medalist(s)
Lee Sung-jin	Individual	671	2	Tuimalealiifano (SAM) (63); W 6–0	Esebua (GEO) (34); W 6–2	Bishindee (MGL) (18); W 6–0	Avitia (MEX) (10); L 2–6	Did not advance		
Choi Hyun-joo; Ki Bo-bae; Lee Sung-jin	Team	1993	1	—N/a		Bye	Denmark (8); W 206–195	Japan (5); W 221–206	China (7); W 210–209	1st place, gold medalist(s)

== Athletics ==
South Korean athletes have so far achieved qualifying standards in the following athletics events (up to a maximum of 3 athletes in each event at the 'A' Standard, and 1 at the 'B' Standard):

Key

- Note–Ranks given for track events are within the athlete's heat only
- Q = Qualified for the next round
- q = Qualified for the next round as a fastest loser or, in field events, by position without achieving the qualifying target
- NR = National record
- N/A = Round not applicable for the event
- Bye = Athlete not required to compete in round

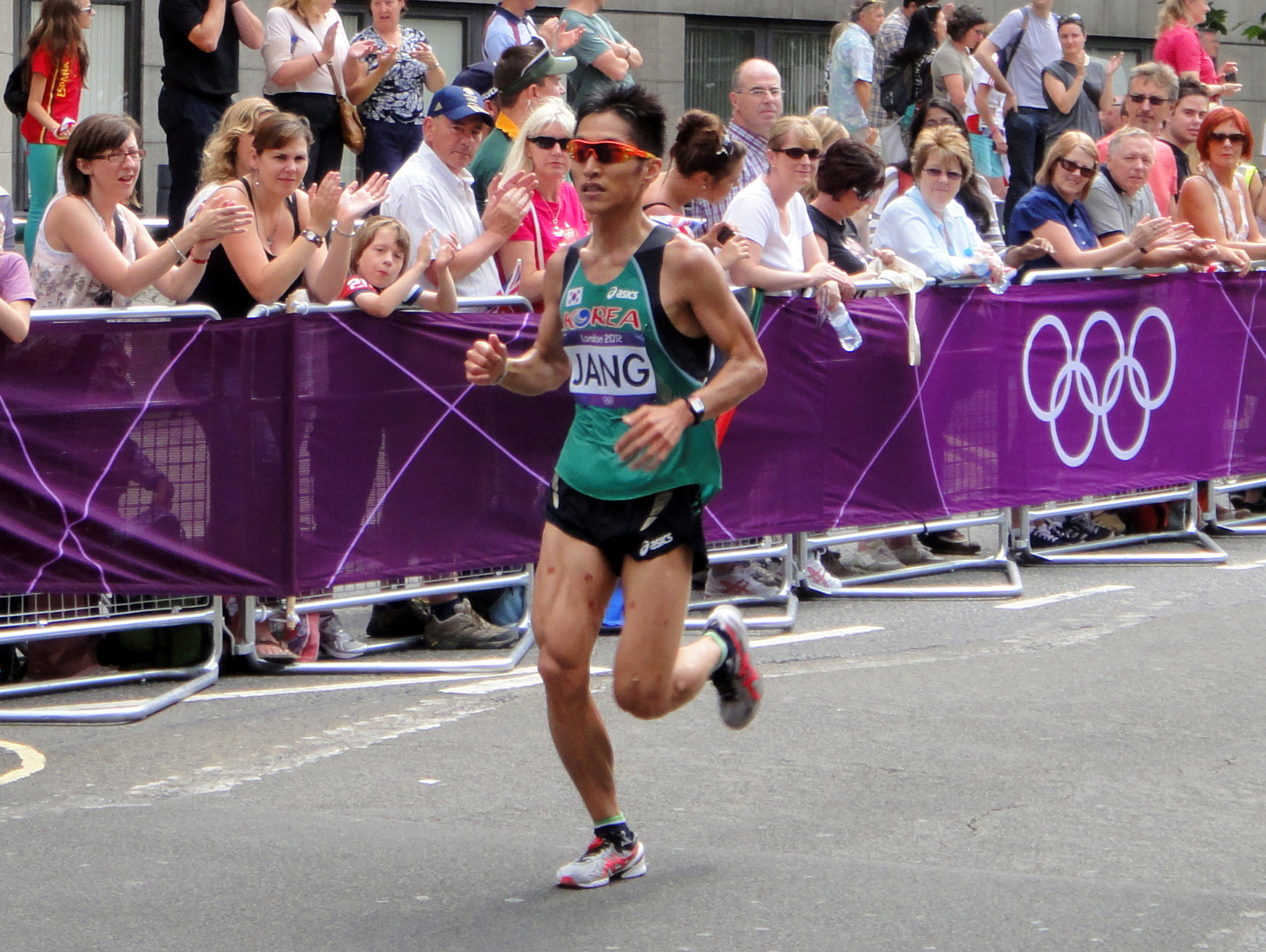
Jang Sin-Kweon in men's marathon

Men
Track & road events

Athlete	Event	Final	
Athlete	Event	Result	Rank
Jang Sin-kweon	Marathon	2:28:20	73
Jeong Jin-hyeok	Marathon	2:38:45	82
Lee Doo-hang	Marathon	2:17:19	32
Byun Young-jun	20 km walk	1:23:26	31
Kim Hyun-sub	20 km walk	1:21:36	17
Park Chil-sung	20 km walk	DNF	
Kim Dong-young	50 km walk	3:57:33	38
Park Chil-sung	50 km walk	3:45:55 NR	13
Yim Jung-hyun	50 km walk	3:56:34	34

Field events

Athlete	Event	Qualification		Final	
Athlete	Event	Distance	Position	Distance	Position
Kim Deok-hyeon	Triple jump	16.22	22	Did not advance	
Kim Yoo-suk	Pole vault	NM	—	Did not advance	
Jung Sang-jin	Javelin throw	76.39	31	Did not advance	

Women
Track & road events

Athlete	Event	Heat		Semifinal		Final	
Athlete	Event	Result	Rank	Result	Rank	Result	Rank
Jung Hye-lim	100 m hurdles	13.48	7	Did not advance			
Chung Yun-hee	Marathon	—N/a				2:31:58	41
Kim Sung-eun	Marathon	—N/a				2:46:38	96
Lim Kyung-hee	Marathon	—N/a				2:39:03	76
Jeon Yong-eun	20 km walk	—N/a				DSQ	

Field events

Athlete	Event	Qualification		Final	
Athlete	Event	Distance	Position	Distance	Position
Choi Yun-hee	Pole vault	4.10	18	Did not advance	

== Badminton ==
Men

Athlete	Event	Group Stage				Elimination	Quarterfinal	Semifinal	Final / BM	
Athlete	Event	Opposition Score	Opposition Score	Opposition Score	Rank	Opposition Score	Opposition Score	Opposition Score	Opposition Score	Rank
Lee Hyun-il	Singles	Pacheco (PER); W (21–12, 21–7)	—N/a		1 Q	Jørgensen (DEN); W (21–17, 21–13)	Chen J (CHN); W (21–15, 21–16)	Lin D (CHN); L (12–21, 10–21)	Chen L (CHN); L (12–21, 21–15, 15–21)	4
Son Wan-ho	Singles	Ivanov (RUS); W (21–15, 21–19)	Hsu J-h (TPE); W (21–14, 21–10)	—N/a	1 Q	Gade (DEN); L (9–21, 16–21)	Did not advance			
Jung Jae-sung; Lee Yong-dae	Doubles	Bach / Gunawan (USA); W (21–14, 21–19)	Kawamae / Sato (JPN); W (21–16, 21–15)	Koo K K / Tan B H (MAS); W (21–16, 21–11)	1 Q	—N/a	Ahsan / Septano (INA); W (21–12, 21–16)	Boe / Mogensen (DEN); L (21–17, 18–21 20–22)	Koo K K / Tan B H (MAS); W (23–21, 21–10)	3rd place, bronze medalist(s)
Ko Sung-hyun; Yoo Yeon-seong	Doubles	Cwalina / Łogosz (POL); W (17–21, 21–7, 21–13)	Isara / Jongjit (THA); L (15–21, 14–21)	Ahsan / Septano (INA); L (22–24, 12–21)	3	—N/a	Did not advance			

Women

Athlete	Event	Group Stage				Elimination	Quarterfinal	Semifinal	Final / BM	
Athlete	Event	Opposition Score	Opposition Score	Opposition Score	Rank	Opposition Score	Opposition Score	Opposition Score	Opposition Score	Rank
Bae Youn-joo	Singles	Tee J Y (MAS); W (16–21, 21–15, 21–12)	Allegrini (ITA); W (21–11, 21–15)	—N/a	1 Q	Wang Yh (CHN); L (21–15, 14–21, 14–21)	Did not advance			
Sung Ji-hyun	Singles	Kværnø (NOR); W (21–8, 21–5)	Yip P Y (HKG); L (18–21, 21–23)	—N/a	2	Did not advance				
Ha Jung-eun; Kim Min-jung	Doubles	Choo / Veeran (AUS); W (21–7, 21–19)	Edwards / Viljoen (RSA); W (21–8, 21–7)	Jauhari / Polii (INA); W (18–21, 21–14, 21–12)	1 Q	—N/a	Disqualified – match fixing			
Jung Kyung-eun; Kim Ha-na	Doubles	Bruce / Li (CAN); W (21–5, 21–11)	Sorokina / Vislova (RUS); W (23–21, 21–18)	Wang Xl / Yu Y (CHN); W (21–14, 21–11)	1 Q	—N/a	Disqualified – match fixing			

Mixed

Athlete	Event	Group Stage				Quarterfinal	Semifinal	Final / BM	
Athlete	Event	Opposition Score	Opposition Score	Opposition Score	Rank	Opposition Score	Opposition Score	Opposition Score	Rank
Lee Yong-dae; Ha Jung-eun	Doubles	Ahmad / Natsir (INA); L (19–21, 12–21)	Laybourn / Rytter Juhl (DEN); L (15–21 12–21)	Diju / Gutta (IND); W (21–15, 21–15)	3	Did not advance			

== Boxing ==
South Korea has so far qualified in the following events.

Men

Athlete	Event	Round of 32	Round of 16	Quarterfinals	Semifinals	Final	
Athlete	Event	Opposition Result	Opposition Result	Opposition Result	Opposition Result	Opposition Result	Rank
Shin Jong-hun	Light flyweight	Bye	Aleksandrov (BUL); L 14–15	Did not advance			
Han Soon-chul	Lightweight	Eliwa (EGY); W 11–6	Safaryants (BLR); W 13^{+}–13	Gaibnazarov (UZB); W 16–13	Petrauskas (LTU); W 18–13	Lomachenko (UKR); L 9–19	2nd place, silver medalist(s)

== Cycling ==
=== Road ===
Athlete	Event	Time	Rank
Park Sung-baek	Men's road race	Did not finish	
Na Ah-reum	Women's road race	3:35:56	13

=== Track ===
Sprint

Athlete	Event	Qualification		Round 1	Repechage 1	Round 2	Repechage 2	Quarterfinals	Semifinals	Final	
Athlete	Event	Time Speed (km/h)	Rank	Opposition Time Speed (km/h)	Opposition Time Speed (km/h)	Opposition Time Speed (km/h)	Opposition Time Speed (km/h)	Opposition Time Speed (km/h)	Opposition Time Speed (km/h)	Opposition Time Speed (km/h)	Rank
Lee Hye-jin	Women's sprint	11.405; 63.130	14	Panarina (BLR); L	Sullivan (CAN); Maeda (JPN); L	Did not advance					

Team sprint

Athlete	Event	Qualification		Semifinals		Final	
Athlete	Event	Time Speed (km/h)	Rank	Opposition Time Speed (km/h)	Rank	Opposition Time Speed (km/h)	Rank
Lee Eun-ji; Lee Hye-jin	Women's team sprint	34.636; 51.969	9	Did not advance			

Pursuit

Athlete	Event	Qualification		Semifinals		Final	
Athlete	Event	Time	Rank	Opponent Results	Rank	Opponent Results	Rank
Choi Seung-woo; Jang Sun-jae; Park Keon-woo; Park Seon-ho	Men's team pursuit	4:07.210	10	Did not advance			

Keirin

Athlete	Event	1st Round	Repechage	2nd Round	Final
Athlete	Event	Rank	Rank	Rank	Rank
Lee Hye-jin	Women's keirin	5	6	Did not advance	17

Omnium

Athlete	Event	Flying lap		Points race		Elimination race	Individual pursuit		Scratch race	Time trial		Total points	Rank
Athlete	Event	Time	Rank	Points	Rank	Rank	Time	Rank	Rank	Time	Rank	Total points	Rank
Cho Ho-sung	Men's omnium	13.614	12	20	10	9	4:32.382	13	8	1:04.150	8	60	11
Lee Min-hye	Women's omnium	14.793	14	3	14	11	3:46.871	15	9	36.547	11	74	15

== Diving ==
Men

Athlete	Event	Preliminaries		Semifinals		Final	
Athlete	Event	Points	Rank	Points	Rank	Points	Rank
Park Ji-ho	10 m platform	370.50	26	Did not advance			

Women

Athlete	Event	Preliminaries		Semifinals		Final	
Athlete	Event	Points	Rank	Points	Rank	Points	Rank
Kim Su-ji	10 m platform	215.75	26	Did not advance			

== Fencing ==
South Korea has qualified 14 fencers.

Men

Athlete	Event	Round of 64	Round of 32	Round of 16	Quarterfinal	Semifinal	Final / BM	
Athlete	Event	Opposition Score	Opposition Score	Opposition Score	Opposition Score	Opposition Score	Opposition Score	Rank
Jung Jin-sun	Individual épée	—N/a	Sukhov (RUS); W 15–11	Alimzhanov (KAZ); W 15–8	Fiedler (GER); W 15–11	Piasecki (NOR); L 13–15	Kelsey (USA); W 12–11	3rd place, bronze medalist(s)
Park Kyoung-doo	Individual épée	—N/a	Kudayev (UZB); L 9–15	Did not advance				
Choi Byung-chul	Individual foil	Bye	Zhu J (CHN); W 15–13	Le Péchoux (FRA); W 15–13	Ma Jf (CHN); W 15–13	Abouelkassem (EGY); L 12–15	Baldini (ITA); W 15–14	3rd place, bronze medalist(s)
Gu Bon-gil	Individual sabre	Bye	Zalomir (ROU); W 15–12	Hartung (GER); L 14–15	Did not advance			
Kim Jung-hwan	Individual sabre	Bye	Zhong M (CHN); L 14–15	Did not advance				
Won Woo-young	Individual sabre	Bye	Wang (CHN); W 15–6	Kovalev (RUS); L 11–15	Did not advance			
Gu Bon-gil; Kim Jung-hwan; Won Woo-young; Oh Eun-seok	Team sabre	—N/a			Germany; W 45–38	Italy; W 45–37	Romania; W 45–26	1st place, gold medalist(s)

Women

Athlete	Event	Round of 64	Round of 32	Round of 16	Quarterfinal	Semifinal	Final / BM	
Athlete	Event	Opposition Score	Opposition Score	Opposition Score	Opposition Score	Opposition Score	Opposition Score	Rank
Choi In-jeong	Individual épée	Bye	Szász (HUN); W 15–12	Besbes (TUN); L 11–12	Did not advance			
Jung Hyo-jung	Individual épée	Bye	Sivkova (RUS); L 12–15	Did not advance				
Shin A-lam	Individual épée	Bye	Schalm (CAN); W 15–12	Sozanska (GER); W 14–9	Măroiu (ROU); W 15–14	Heidemann (GER); L 5–6	Sun Yj (CHN); L 11–15	4
Choi In-jeong; Jung Hyo-jung; Shin A-lam; Choi Eun-sook	Team épée	—N/a			Romania; W 45–38	United States; W 45–36	China; L 25–39	2nd place, silver medalist(s)
Jeon Hee-sook	Individual foil	Bye	Sugawara (JPN); L 13–15	Did not advance				
Jung Gil-ok	Individual foil	Bye	Shanayeva (RUS); W 15–14	Kiefer (USA); L 13–15	Did not advance			
Nam Hyun-hee	Individual foil	Bye	Leleyko (UKR); W 15–9	Mohamed (HUN); W 8–7	Ikehata (JPN); W 15–6	Di Francisca (ITA); L 10–11	Vezzali (ITA); L 12–13	4
Jeon Hee-sook; Jung Gil-ok; Nam Hyun-hee; Oh Ha-na	Team foil	—N/a			United States; W 45–31	Russia; L 32–44	France; W 45–32	3rd place, bronze medalist(s)
Kim Ji-yeon	Individual sabre	—N/a	González (MEX); W 15–3	Marzocca (ITA); W 15–7	Vougiouka (GRE); W 15–12	Zagunis (USA); W 15–13	Velikaya (RUS); W 15–9	1st place, gold medalist(s)
Lee Ra-jin	Individual sabre	—N/a	Benítez (VEN); L 9–15	Did not advance				

== Field hockey ==
The South Korean women's hockey team have qualified a team of 16 players for the games by virtue of being runner-up at the 2010 Asian Games hockey tournament.

=== Men's tournament ===
Roster

The following is the South Korea roster in the men's field hockey tournament of the 2012 Summer Olympics.

Head Coach: Cho Myung-jun

1. Lee Myung-ho
3. Jang Jong-hyun
5. Oh Dae-keun
6. Lee Nam-yong
7. Seo Jong-ho
8. Lee Seung-il
9. Yoon Sung-hoon
10. You Hyo-sik
11. Yeo Woon-kon
13. Kang Moon-kweon
14. Hyun Hye-sung
15. Cha Jong-bok
17. Hong Eun-seong
19. Kim Young-jin
23. Kang Moon-kyu
32. Nam Hyun-woo

Reserves:

- Cho Suk-hoon
- Kim Jae-hyeon

South Korea is in Pool B of the men's tournament.

Group play

Pos	Team	Pld	W	D	L	GF	GA	GD	Pts	Qualification
1	Netherlands	5	5	0	0	18	7	+11	15	Semi-finals
2	Germany	5	3	1	1	14	11	+3	10	Semi-finals
3	Belgium	5	2	1	2	8	7	+1	7	Fifth place game
4	South Korea	5	2	0	3	9	8	+1	6	Seventh place game
5	New Zealand	5	1	2	2	10	14	−4	5	Ninth place game
6	India	5	0	0	5	6	18	−12	0	Eleventh place game

Source: FIH

30 July 2012
08:30

South Korea	2–0	New Zealand
You 20', 34'	Report

Umpires:
Hamish Jamson (GBR)
German Montes de Oca (ARG)

1 August 2012
21:15

South Korea	0–1	Germany
	Report	Zeller 33'

Umpires:
David Gentles (AUS)
Nathan Stagno (GIB)

3 August 2012
21:15

Belgium	2–1	South Korea
Boon 37'; Charlier 61'	Report	Nam 46'

Umpires:
David Gentles (AUS)
Nigel Iggo (NZL)

5 August 2012
13:15

India	1–4	South Korea
Chandi 10'	Report	Jang 6'; Nam 59', 70'; Seo 68'

Umpires:
Simon Taylor (NZL)
Gary Simmonds (RSA)

7 August 2012
08:30

South Korea	2–4	Netherlands
Nam 53'; Lee N. 62'	Report	Van der Weerden 17'; Verga 21'; Weusthof 47'; Bakker 64'

Umpires:
Marcin Grochal (POL)
Ged Curran (GBR)

7th/8th place game

9 August 2012
11:30

Pakistan	3–2	South Korea
Waqas 31'; Khan 44'; Imran 61'	Report	Hyun 30', 33'

Umpires:
Marcelo Servetto (ESP)
Simon Taylor (NZL)

=== Women's tournament ===
Roster

The following is the South Korea roster in the women's field hockey tournament of the 2012 Summer Olympics.

Head Coach: Lim Heung-sin

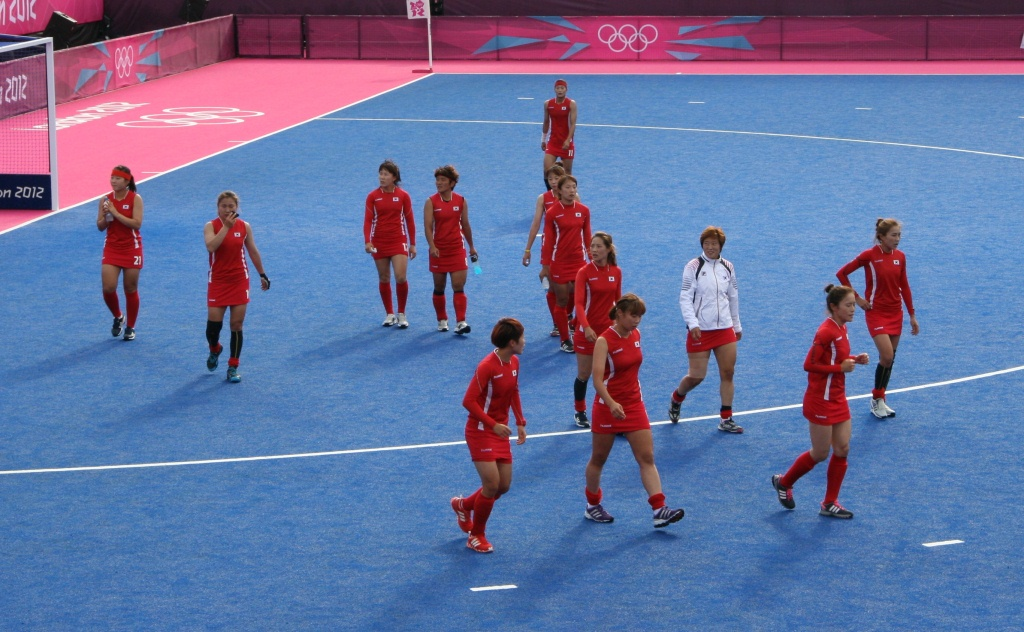
South Korea women's team after the match against Great Britain

1. Moon Young-hui (GK)
4. Kim Young-ran
5. Cha Se-na
6. Park Seon-mi
7. Lee Seon-ok (C)
8. Park Mi-hyun
9. Han Hye-lyoung
10. Kim Jong-hee
11. Kim Jong-eun
12. Kim Da-rae
13. Cheon Seul-ki
14. Jeon Yu-mi
17. Kim Ok-ju
21. Park Ki-ju
22. Jang Soo-ji (GK)
23. Cheon Eun-bi

Reserves:

- Cho Eun-ji
- Hong Yoo-jin

South Korea is in Pool A of the women's competition.

Group play

Pos	Team	Pld	W	D	L	GF	GA	GD	Pts	Qualification
1	Netherlands	5	5	0	0	12	5	+7	15	Semi-finals
2	Great Britain (H)	5	3	0	2	14	7	+7	9	Semi-finals
3	China	5	2	1	2	6	3	+3	7	
4	South Korea	5	2	0	3	9	13	−4	6	
5	Japan	5	1	1	3	4	9	−5	4	
6	Belgium	5	0	2	3	2	10	−8	2	

Source: FIH
Rules for classification: 1) Points; 2) Matches won; 3) Goal difference; 4) Goals for; 5) Head-to-head result.
(H) Hosts

29 July 2012
13:45

China	4–0	South Korea
Ma Yibo 26', 67'; Zhao Yudiao 51'; Li Hongxia 54'	Report

Umpires:
Frances Block (GBR)
Julie Ashton-Lucy (AUS)

31 July 2012
16:00

Great Britain	5–3	South Korea
White 6'; Cullen 25'; Danson 38'; Twigg 61'; Rogers 62'	Report	Kim Da-rae 18'; Han Hye-lyoung 52'; Park Mi-hyun 57'

Umpires:
Stella Bartlema (NED)
Lisa Roach (AUS)

2 August 2012
08:30

South Korea	1–0	Japan
Cheon Seul-ki 42'	Report

Umpires:
Miao Lin (CHN)
Frances Block (GBR)

4 August 2012
10:45

Netherlands	3–2	South Korea
Welten 10'; Hoog 14'; Dirkse van den Heuvel 36'	Report	Cheon Seul-ki 5', 65'

Umpires:
Irene Presenqui (ARG)
Claire Adenot (FRA)

6 August 2012
16:00

South Korea	3–1	Belgium
Kim Jong-eun 8', 70'; Lee Seon-ok 24'	Report	Coppey 37'

Umpires:
Julie Ashton-Lucy (AUS)
Miao Lin (CHN)

7th/8th place

8 August 2012
11:30

South Korea	1–4	Germany
Cheon Seul-ki 8'	Report	Hahn 6', 16'; Rinne 55'; Mavers 70'

Umpires:
Carolina de la Fuente (ARG)
Claire Adenot (FRA)

== Football ==
=== Men's tournament ===
South Korea qualified a team of 18 players for the men's tournament. The squad won the bronze medal and the team were granted exemption to two years of mandatory military service but still required to do four weeks of basic training.

Roster

The following is the South Korea roster in the men's football tournament of the 2012 Summer Olympics.

Coach: Hong Myung-bo

No.	Pos.	Player	Date of birth (age)	Caps	Goals	2012 club
1	GK	Jung Sung-ryong*	4 January 1985 (aged 27)	17	1	(Korea Football Association) Suwon Samsung Bluewings
2	DF	Oh Jae-suk	4 January 1990 (aged 22)	14	0	(Korea Football Association) Gangwon FC
3	DF	Yun Suk-young	13 February 1990 (aged 22)	16	0	(Korea Football Association) Jeonnam Dragons
4	DF	Kim Young-gwon	27 February 1990 (aged 22)	13	0	(Chinese Football Association) Guangzhou Evergrande
5	DF	Kim Kee-hee	13 July 1989 (aged 23)	2	2	(Korea Football Association) Daegu FC
6	MF	Ki Sung-yueng	24 April 1989 (aged 23)	14	0	(Scottish Football Association) Celtic
7	MF	Kim Bo-kyung	6 October 1989 (aged 22)	19	4	(Japan Football Association) Cerezo Osaka
8	MF	Baek Sung-dong	13 August 1991 (aged 20)	7	2	(Japan Football Association) Júbilo Iwata
9	FW	Ji Dong-won	28 May 1991 (aged 21)	10	2	(The Football Association) Sunderland
10	FW	Park Chu-young*	10 July 1985 (aged 27)	22	9	(The Football Association) Arsenal
11	MF	Nam Tae-hee	3 July 1991 (aged 21)	2	2	(Qatar Football Association) Lekhwiya
12	DF	Hwang Seok-ho	27 June 1989 (aged 23)	2	0	(Japan Football Association) Sanfrecce Hiroshima
13	MF	Koo Ja-cheol (c)	27 February 1989 (aged 23)	8	3	(German Football Association) FC Augsburg
14	DF	Kim Chang-soo*	12 September 1985 (aged 26)	18	1	(Korea Football Association) Busan IPark
15	MF	Park Jong-woo	10 March 1989 (aged 23)	4	1	(Korea Football Association) Busan IPark
16	MF	Jung Woo-young	14 December 1989 (aged 22)	6	0	(Japan Football Association) Kyoto Sanga
17	FW	Kim Hyun-sung	27 September 1989 (aged 22)	6	2	(Korea Football Association) FC Seoul
18	GK	Lee Bum-young	2 April 1989 (aged 23)	9	0	(Korea Football Association) Busan IPark

* Over-aged player.

Group play

Pos	Team	Pld	W	D	L	GF	GA	GD	Pts	Qualification
1	Mexico	3	2	1	0	3	0	+3	7	Advance to knockout stage
2	South Korea	3	1	2	0	2	1	+1	5	Advance to knockout stage
3	Gabon	3	0	2	1	1	3	−2	2	
4	Switzerland	3	0	1	2	2	4	−2	1	

Source: FIFA
Rules for classification: Group stage tiebreakers
26 July 2012
14:30

Mexico	0–0	South Korea
	Report

St James' Park, Newcastle
Attendance: 15,748
Referee: Slim Jedidi (Tunisia)

29 July 2012
17:15

South Korea	2–1	Switzerland
Park Chu-young 57'; Kim Bo-kyung 64'	Report	Emeghara 60'

Ricoh Arena, Coventry
Attendance: 30,114
Referee: Raúl Orosco (Bolivia)

1 August 2012
17:00

South Korea	0–0	Gabon
	Report

Wembley Stadium, London
Attendance: 76,927
Referee: Pavel Královec (Czech Republic)

Quarter-final

4 August 2012
19:30

Great Britain	1–1 (a.e.t.)	South Korea
Ramsey 36' (pen.)	Report	Ji Dong-won 29'
Penalties
Ramsey (penalty scored); Cleverley (penalty scored); Dawson (penalty scored); Giggs (penalty scored); Sturridge (penalty missed)	4–5	(penalty scored) Koo Ja-cheol; (penalty scored) Baek Sung-dong; (penalty scored) Hwang Seok-ho; (penalty scored) Park Jong-woo; (penalty scored) Ki Sung-yueng

Millennium Stadium, Cardiff
Attendance: 70,171
Referee: Wilmar Roldán (Colombia)

Semi-final

7 August 2012
19:45

South Korea	0–3	Brazil
	Report	Rômulo 38'; Damião 57', 64'

Old Trafford, Manchester
Attendance: 69,389
Referee: Pavel Královec (Czech Republic)

Bronze medal game

10 August 2012
19:45

South Korea	2–0	Japan
Park Chu-young 38'; Koo Ja-cheol 57'	Report

Millennium Stadium, Cardiff
Attendance: 56,393
Referee: Ravshan Irmatov (Uzbekistan)

Final rank
Bronze

Controversy

Park Jong-Woo was not present at the medal ceremony after the gold medal match between Mexico and Brazil and did not receive the bronze medal with the rest of his team due to his political position on the Liancourt Rocks, which are disputed both by South Korea and Japan by having a claim on the islands, after FIFA was notified about Park holding a sign of South Korea having claim on Dokdo, the Korean name for the islets. On 11 February 2013, Park attended an International Olympic Committee disciplinary hearing at Lausanne, Switzerland. After the Disciplinary Commission reviewed Park's action at the Olympics, the IOC decided to award the player the bronze medal he had been barred from collecting for several months.

== Gymnastics ==
=== Artistic ===
Men
Team

Athlete	Event	Qualification								Final							
Athlete	Event	Apparatus						Total	Rank	Apparatus						Total	Rank
Athlete	Event	F	PH	R	V	PB	HB	Total	Rank	F	PH	R	V	PB	HB	Total	Rank
Kim Hee-hoon	Team	12.933	12.100	14.166	—N/a	13.700	—N/a			Did not advance							
Kim Ji-hoon	Team	12.900	13.100	—N/a			15.500 Q	—N/a		Did not advance							
Kim Seung-il	Team	—N/a	12.133	12.666	14.533	14.033	13.233	—N/a		Did not advance							
Kim Soo-myun	Team	14.766	13.433	13.833	15.666	14.700	13.933	86.331	23 Q	Did not advance							
Yang Hak-seon	Team	14.066	—N/a	13.933	16.233 Q	11.966	11.233	—N/a		Did not advance							
Total	Team	41.765	38.666	41.932	47.865	42.433	42.666	265.327	12	Did not advance							

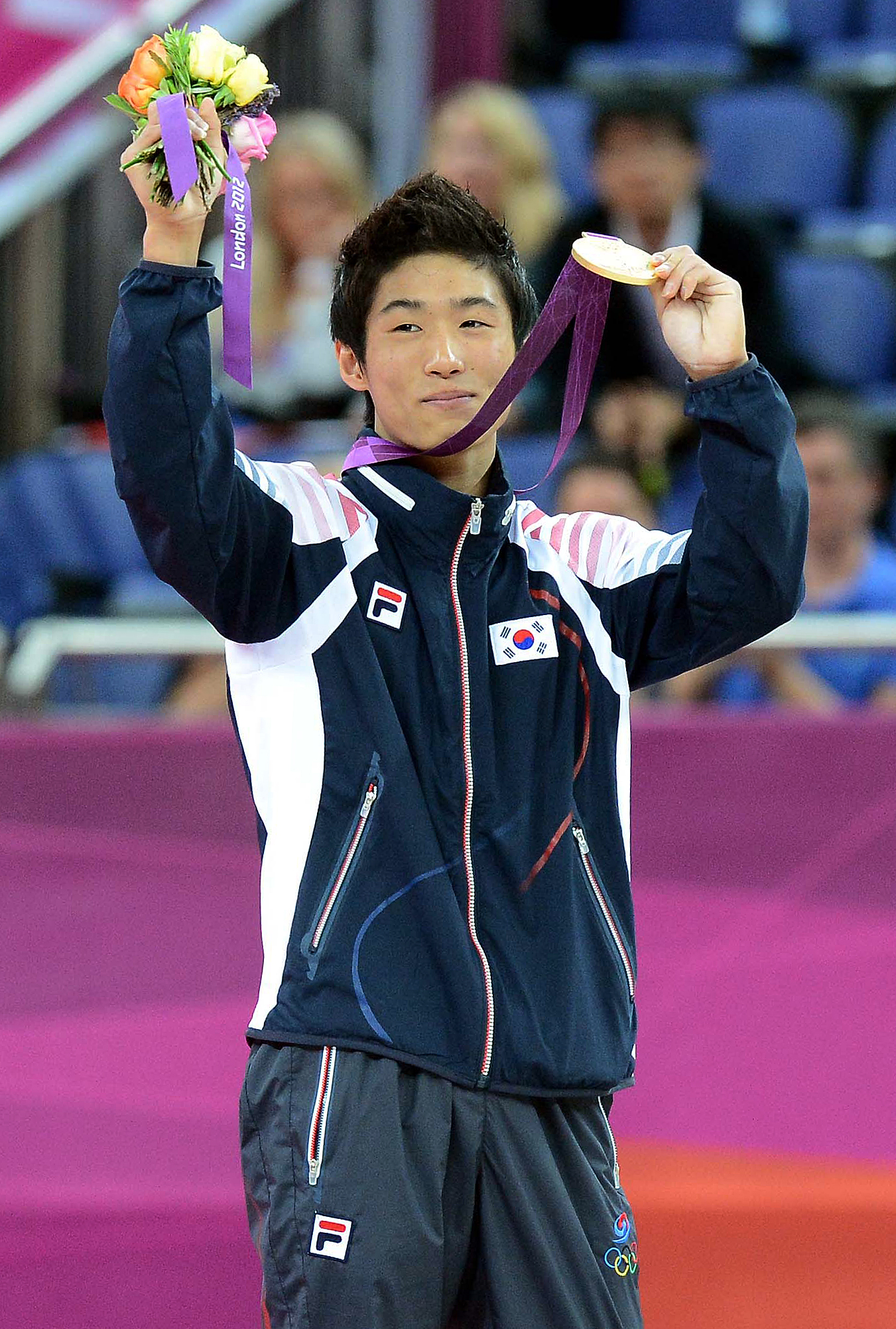
Yang Hak-Seon captures South Korea's first ever gold medal in artistic gymnastics.

Individual finals

Athlete	Event	Apparatus						Total	Rank
Athlete	Event	F	PH	R	V	PB	HB	Total	Rank
Kim Ji-hoon	Horizontal bar	—N/a					15.133	15.133	8
Kim Soo-myun	All-around	12.266	13.700	14.200	16.000	14.641	14.966	85.773	20
Yang Hak-seon	Vault	—N/a			16.533	—N/a		16.533	1st place, gold medalist(s)

Women

Athlete	Event	Qualification						Final					
Athlete	Event	Apparatus				Total	Rank	Apparatus				Total	Rank
Athlete	Event	F	V	UB	BB	Total	Rank	F	V	UB	BB	Total	Rank
Heo Seon-mi	All-around	13.233	13.800	12.166	11.400	50.599	48	Did not advance					

=== Rhythmic ===
Athlete	Event	Qualification						Final					
Athlete	Event	Hoop	Ball	Clubs	Ribbon	Total	Rank	Hoop	Ball	Clubs	Ribbon	Total	Rank
Son Yeon-jae	Individual	28.075	27.825	26.350	28.050	110.300	6 Q	28.050	28.325	26.750	28.350	111.475	5

== Handball ==
South Korea has qualified for the men's and women's event by winning the Asian Olympic Qualification Tournament

=== Men's tournament ===
The following is the South Korea roster in the men's handball tournament of the 2012 Summer Olympics.

Head coaches: Cho Young-shin

No.	Pos.	Name	Date of birth (age)	Height	App.	Goals	Club
1	GK	Lee Chang-woo	12 May 1983 (aged 29)	1.87 m			(South Korea) Chungnam
2	CB	Jeong Yi-kyeong	28 February 1985 (aged 27)	1.88 m			(South Korea) Doosan
5	P	Park Kyung-suk	25 April 1981 (aged 31)	1.85 m			(South Korea) Chungnam
7	RW	Jung Su-young	17 October 1985 (aged 26)	1.84 m			(South Korea) HC Korosa
8	P	Park Jung-gyu	2 November 1983 (aged 28)	1.90 m			(South Korea) KHF
11	LW	Lim Duk-jun	30 August 1980 (aged 31)	1.86 m			(South Korea) Doosan
12	GK	Park Chan-young	26 January 1983 (aged 29)	1.90 m			(South Korea) Doosan
13	RB	Lee Jae-woo	28 September 1979 (aged 32)	1.81 m			(South Korea) Doosan
17	RW	Yu Dong-geun	3 September 1985 (aged 26)	1.85 m			(South Korea) Incheon DTC
19	LW	Jeong Han	17 May 1988 (aged 24)	1.85 m			(South Korea) Incheon DTC
20	LB	Paek Won-chul	10 January 1977 (aged 35)	1.80 m			(South Korea) HC Korosa
22	LB	Ko Kyung-soo	5 February 1985 (aged 27)	1.82 m			(South Korea) Chungnam
33	RB	Eom Hyo-won	12 December 1986 (aged 25)	1.82 m			(South Korea) Sangmu
77	RB	Yoon Kyung-shin	7 July 1973 (aged 39)	2.03 m			(South Korea) KHF
88	P	Jung Jin-ho	10 March 1986 (aged 26)	1.93 m			(South Korea) HC Korosa

Group play

Team	Pld	W	D	L	GF	GA	GD	Pts	Qualification
Croatia	5	5	0	0	150	109	+41	10	Quarter-finals
Denmark	5	4	0	1	124	129	−5	8	Quarter-finals
Spain	5	3	0	2	140	126	+14	6	Quarter-finals
Hungary	5	2	0	3	114	128	−14	4	Quarter-finals
Serbia	5	1	0	4	120	131	−11	2	
South Korea	5	0	0	5	115	140	−25	0	

29 July 2012; 11:15	Croatia	31 – 21	South Korea	Copper Box, London; Attendance: 4,068; Referees: Marina, Minore (ARG)
29 July 2012; 11:15	Čupić 8	(14–8)	Jeong Yi-kyeong 5	Copper Box, London; Attendance: 4,068; Referees: Marina, Minore (ARG)
29 July 2012; 11:15	1× (yellow card) 4× (suspension)	Report	2× (yellow card) 6× (suspension)	Copper Box, London; Attendance: 4,068; Referees: Marina, Minore (ARG)

31 July 2012; 11:15	South Korea	19 – 22	Hungary	Copper Box, London; Attendance: 4,262; Referees: Nachevski, Nikolov (MKD)
31 July 2012; 11:15	Jeong Yi-kyeong, Jeong Han 4	(9–7)	Lékai 5	Copper Box, London; Attendance: 4,262; Referees: Nachevski, Nikolov (MKD)
31 July 2012; 11:15	4× (yellow card) 3× (suspension)	Report	4× (yellow card) 4× (suspension)	Copper Box, London; Attendance: 4,262; Referees: Nachevski, Nikolov (MKD)

2 August 2012; 09:30	Spain	33 – 29	South Korea	Copper Box, London; Attendance: 4,209; Referees: Lazaar, Reveret (FRA)
2 August 2012; 09:30	Ugalde 6	(16–14)	Lee Jae-woo 8	Copper Box, London; Attendance: 4,209; Referees: Lazaar, Reveret (FRA)
2 August 2012; 09:30	3× (yellow card) 4× (suspension)	Report	2× (yellow card) 8× (suspension)	Copper Box, London; Attendance: 4,209; Referees: Lazaar, Reveret (FRA)

4 August 2012; 11:15	South Korea	22 – 28	Serbia	Copper Box, London; Attendance: 4,525; Referees: Bonaventura, Bonaventura (FRA)
4 August 2012; 11:15	Jeong Han 6	(10–12)	Nikčević, Toskić 5	Copper Box, London; Attendance: 4,525; Referees: Bonaventura, Bonaventura (FRA)
4 August 2012; 11:15	3× (yellow card) 2× (suspension)	Report	6× (yellow card) 1× (suspension)	Copper Box, London; Attendance: 4,525; Referees: Bonaventura, Bonaventura (FRA)

6 August 2012; 14:30	Denmark	26 – 24	South Korea	Copper Box, London; Attendance: 4,546; Referees: Al-Nuaimi, Omar (UAE)
6 August 2012; 14:30	Eggert Jensen, Knudsen 6	(13–14)	Lee Jae-woo, Eom Hyo-won 6	Copper Box, London; Attendance: 4,546; Referees: Al-Nuaimi, Omar (UAE)
6 August 2012; 14:30	4× (yellow card) 2× (suspension)	Report	2× (yellow card) 1× (suspension)	Copper Box, London; Attendance: 4,546; Referees: Al-Nuaimi, Omar (UAE)

=== Women's tournament ===
Team roster

The following is the South Korea roster in the women's handball tournament of the 2012 Summer Olympics.

Head coaches: Kang Jae-won

No.	Pos.	Name	Date of birth (age)	Height	App.	Goals	Club
1	GK	Ju Hui	4 November 1989 (aged 22)	1.80 m	0	0	(South Korea) Colorful Daegu
2	RW	Woo Sun-hee	1 July 1978 (aged 34)	1.72 m	0	0	(South Korea) Wonderful Samcheok
3	CB	Kim On-a	6 September 1988 (aged 23)	1.69 m	0	0	(South Korea) Incheon Sports Council
5	RW	Jung Yu-ra	6 February 1992 (aged 20)	1.70 m	0	0	(South Korea) Colorful Daegu
7	LB	Gwon Han-na	22 November 1989 (aged 22)	1.72 m	0	0	(South Korea) Seoul City
9	P	Kim Cha-youn	10 February 1981 (aged 31)	1.73 m	0	0	(Japan) Omron handball
10	LB	Lee Mi-gyeong	2 October 1991 (aged 20)	1.65 m	0	0	(South Korea) Seoul City
11	RB	Ryu Eun-hee	24 February 1990 (aged 22)	1.80 m	0	0	(South Korea) Incheon Sports Council
12	GK	Moon Kyeong-ha	29 May 1980 (aged 32)	1.76 m	0	0	(South Korea) GNDC
13	P	Kim Cheong-sim	8 February 1976 (aged 36)	1.78 m	0	0	(South Korea) SK Lubricants
17	LB	Sim Hae-in	31 October 1987 (aged 24)	1.78 m	0	0	(South Korea) Wonderful Samcheok
19	RB	Choi Im-jeong	14 February 1981 (aged 31)	1.82 m	0	0	(South Korea) Colorful Daegu
20	CB	Jung Ji-hae	6 March 1985 (aged 27)	1.68 m	0	0	(South Korea) Wonderful Samcheok
21	LW	Jo Hyo-bi	15 July 1991 (aged 21)	1.65 m	0	0	(South Korea) Incheon Sports Council
33	LW	Lee Eun-bi	23 October 1990 (aged 21)	1.63 m	0	0	(South Korea) BISCO

Group play

Team	Pld	W	D	L	GF	GA	GD	Pts	Qualification
France	5	4	1	0	125	103	+22	9	Quarter-finals
South Korea	5	3	1	1	136	130	+6	7	Quarter-finals
Spain	5	3	1	1	119	114	+5	7	Quarter-finals
Norway	5	2	1	2	118	120	−2	5	Quarter-finals
Denmark	5	1	0	4	113	121	−8	2	
Sweden	5	0	0	5	108	131	−23	0	

28 July 2012; 11:15	Spain	27 – 31	South Korea	Copper Box, London; Attendance: 3,900; Referees: Gubica, Milošević (CRO)
28 July 2012; 11:15	Martín 7	(12–16)	Ryu Eun-hee 9	Copper Box, London; Attendance: 3,900; Referees: Gubica, Milošević (CRO)
28 July 2012; 11:15	3× (yellow card) 2× (suspension)	Report	3× (yellow card) 3× (suspension)	Copper Box, London; Attendance: 3,900; Referees: Gubica, Milošević (CRO)

30 July 2012; 11:15	South Korea	25 – 24	Denmark	Copper Box, London; Attendance: 4,393; Referees: Duţă, Florescu (ROU)
30 July 2012; 11:15	Jo Hyo-bi 5	(11–10)	Larsen 7	Copper Box, London; Attendance: 4,393; Referees: Duţă, Florescu (ROU)
30 July 2012; 11:15	3× (yellow card) 1× (suspension)	Report	3× (yellow card) 2× (suspension)	Copper Box, London; Attendance: 4,393; Referees: Duţă, Florescu (ROU)

1 August 2012; 09:30	Norway	27 – 27	South Korea	Copper Box, London; Attendance: 4,178; Referees: Nachevski, Nikolov (MKD)
1 August 2012; 09:30	Sulland 11	(13–15)	three players 6	Copper Box, London; Attendance: 4,178; Referees: Nachevski, Nikolov (MKD)
1 August 2012; 09:30	3× (yellow card)	Report	2× (yellow card) 3× (suspension)	Copper Box, London; Attendance: 4,178; Referees: Nachevski, Nikolov (MKD)

3 August 2012; 11:15	South Korea	21 – 24	France	Copper Box, London; Attendance: 4,568; Referees: Nikolić, Stojković (SRB)
3 August 2012; 11:15	Sim Hae-in 6	(12–10)	Lacrabère 4	Copper Box, London; Attendance: 4,568; Referees: Nikolić, Stojković (SRB)
3 August 2012; 11:15	2× (yellow card) 3× (suspension)	Report	4× (yellow card) 2× (suspension)	Copper Box, London; Attendance: 4,568; Referees: Nikolić, Stojković (SRB)

5 August 2012; 09:30	Sweden	28 – 32	South Korea	Copper Box, London; Attendance: 4,180; Referees: Abdulla, Bamutref (QAT)
5 August 2012; 09:30	Flognman 8	(13–16)	Ryu Eun-hee 10	Copper Box, London; Attendance: 4,180; Referees: Abdulla, Bamutref (QAT)
5 August 2012; 09:30	4× (yellow card) 4× (suspension)	Report	3× (yellow card) 5× (suspension)	Copper Box, London; Attendance: 4,180; Referees: Abdulla, Bamutref (QAT)

Quarter-final

7 August 2012; 17:00	Russia	23 – 24	South Korea	Copper Box, London; Attendance: 4,299; Referees: Lopéz, Sabroso (ESP)
7 August 2012; 17:00	Postnova, Levina 5	(11–14)	Gwon Han-na 6	Copper Box, London; Attendance: 4,299; Referees: Lopéz, Sabroso (ESP)
7 August 2012; 17:00	4× (yellow card) 2× (suspension)	Report	3× (yellow card) 5× (suspension)	Copper Box, London; Attendance: 4,299; Referees: Lopéz, Sabroso (ESP)

Semi-final

9 August 2012; 17:00	Norway	31 – 25	South Korea	Basketball Arena, London; Attendance: 9,274; Referees: Gubica, Milošević (CRO)
9 August 2012; 17:00	Løke 8	(18–15)	Gwon Han-na 7	Basketball Arena, London; Attendance: 9,274; Referees: Gubica, Milošević (CRO)
9 August 2012; 17:00	3× (yellow card) 2× (suspension)	Report	3× (yellow card) 2× (suspension)	Basketball Arena, London; Attendance: 9,274; Referees: Gubica, Milošević (CRO)

Bronze medal match

11 August 2012
17:00
South Korea
29 – 31 (ET)
Spain
Basketball Arena, London
Attendance: 9,622
Referees: Olesen, Pedersen (DEN)
Gwon Han-na 7
(13–13)
Alberto, Fernández 5
1× (yellow card) 2× (suspension)
Report
2× (yellow card) 4× (suspension)

FT: 24–24 ET: 4–4, 1–3

== Judo ==
Men

Athlete	Event	Round of 64	Round of 32	Round of 16	Quarterfinals	Semifinals	Repechage	Final / BM	
Athlete	Event	Opposition Result	Opposition Result	Opposition Result	Opposition Result	Opposition Result	Opposition Result	Opposition Result	Rank
Choi Gwang-hyeon	−60 kg	Bye	Chammartin (SUI); W 0001–0000	Jokinen (FIN); W 0010–0000	Galtsyan (RUS); L 0001–0001 YUS	Did not advance	Kitadai (BRA); L 0001–0011	Did not advance	7
Cho Jun-ho	−66 kg	Bye	Drebot (UKR); W 0011–0002	Farmonov (UZB); W 0011–0001	Ebinuma (JPN); L 0001–0001 YUS	Did not advance	Oates (GBR); W 0021–0002	Uriarte (ESP); W 0000–0001	3rd place, bronze medalist(s)
Wang Ki-chun	−73 kg	Tatalashvili (GEO); W 0001–0000	Ibragimov (KAZ); W 1001–0000	Ježek (CZE); W 0010–0001	Delpopolo (USA); W 0000–0000 YUS	Isaev (RUS); L 0002–0011	Bye	Legrand (FRA); L 0001–0101	5
Kim Jae-bum	−81 kg	Bye	Imamov (UZB); W 0010–0001	Csoknyai (HUN); W 0010–0002	Lucenti (ARG); W 0100–0003	Nifontov (RUS); W 0100–0001	Bye	Bischof (GER); W 0020–0001	1st place, gold medalist(s)
Song Dae-nam	−90 kg	—N/a	Romero (URU); W 1001–0000	Mammadov (AZE); W 0011–0000	Nishiyama (JPN); W 0111–0101	Camilo (BRA); W 0112–0012	Bye	González (CUB); W 0101–0001	1st place, gold medalist(s)
Hwang Hee-tae	−100 kg	—N/a	Mekić (BIH); W 0021–0002	Bloshenko (UKR); W 1001–0000	Gasimov (AZE); W 0021–0002	Naidangiin (MGL); L 0001–0010	Bye	Grol (NED); L 0000–0100	5
Kim Sung-min	+100 kg	—N/a	Hoshina (PHI); W 0100–0000	Ceraj (SLO); W 0020–0001	Makarau (BLR); W 0011–0002	Riner (FRA); L 0003–0100	Bye	Silva (BRA); L 0000–0100	5

Women

Athlete	Event	Round of 32	Round of 16	Quarterfinals	Semifinals	Repechage	Final / BM	
Athlete	Event	Opposition Result	Opposition Result	Opposition Result	Opposition Result	Opposition Result	Opposition Result	Rank
Chung Jung-yeon	−48 kg	Bye	van Snick (BEL); L 0000–1000	Did not advance				
Kim Kyung-ok	−52 kg	Bye	Miranda (BRA); W 1012–0001	Forciniti (ITA); L 0001–0001	Did not advance	Gneto (FRA); L 0002–0021	Did not advance	7
Kim Jan-di	−57 kg	Dorjsüren (MGL); W 0001–0001	Quintavalle (ITA); L 0002–1011	Did not advance				
Joung Da-woon	−63 kg	Bye	Yusubova (AZE); W 1000–0000	Ueno (JPN); W 0020–0002	Xu L (CHN); L 0002–0011	Bye	Émane (FRA); L 0000–0000 YUS	5
Hwang Ye-sul	−70 kg	Barbieri (ITA); W 0102–0001	Robra (SUI); W 0011–0002	Sraka (SLO); W 1000–0001	Décosse (FRA); L 0000–0001	Bye	Bosch (NED); L 0011–0011 YUS	5
Jeong Gyeong-mi	−78 kg	Ogata (JPN); L 0002–0010	Did not advance					
Kim Na-young	+78 kg	Bye	Issanova (KAZ); L 0012–0012^{+}	Did not advance				

== Modern pentathlon ==
Based on their results at the 2011 Asian/Oceania Championships three South Korean pentathletes have qualified for London; Hwang Woo-Jin and Jung Jin-Hwa have earned places in the men's event; Yang Soo-jin has earned places in the women's event.

Athlete	Event	Fencing (épée one touch)			Swimming (200 m freestyle)			Riding (show jumping)			Combined: shooting/running (10 m air pistol)/(3000 m)			Total points	Final rank
Athlete	Event	Results	Rank	MP points	Time	Rank	MP points	Penalties	Rank	MP points	Time	Rank	MP Points	Total points	Final rank
Hwang Woo-jin	Men's	14–21	=29	736	2:01.14	5	1348	364	34	736	12:08.88	35	2088	4908	34
Jung Jin-hwa	Men's	16–19	=20	784	2:00.25	4	1360	40	9	1160	10:57.07	19	2372	5676	11
Yang Soo-jin	Women's	14–21	=28	736	2:17.93	15	1148	80	21	1120	12:40.71	24	1960	4964	24

== Rowing ==
South Korea has qualified the following boats.

Men

Athlete	Event	Heats		Repechage		Quarterfinals		Semifinals		Final	
Athlete	Event	Time	Rank	Time	Rank	Time	Rank	Time	Rank	Time	Rank
Kim Dong-yong	Single sculls	7:05.24	4 R	7:03.91	2 QF	7:16.12	5 SC/D	7:48.09	4 FD	7:27.94	21

Women

Athlete	Event	Heats		Repechage		Quarterfinals		Semifinals		Final	
Athlete	Event	Time	Rank	Time	Rank	Time	Rank	Time	Rank	Time	Rank
Kim Ye-ji	Single sculls	8:04.68	6 R	7:50.64	1 QF	8:00.26	4 SC/D	7:59.78	4 FD	8:32.57	19
Kim Myeong-sin; KIm Sol-ji	Lightweight double sculls	7:31.98	4 R	7:27.95	4 FC	—N/a		Bye		7:44.03	14

Qualification Legend: FA=Final A (medal); FB=Final B (non-medal); FC=Final C (non-medal); FD=Final D (non-medal); FE=Final E (non-medal); FF=Final F (non-medal);SA/B=Semifinals A/B; SC/D=Semifinals C/D; SE/F=Semifinals E/F; QF=Quarterfinals; R=Repechage

== Sailing ==
South Korea has qualified 1 boat for each of the following events

Men

Athlete	Event	Race											Net points	Final rank
Athlete	Event	1	2	3	4	5	6	7	8	9	10	M*	Net points	Final rank
Lee Tae-hoon	RS:X	8	6	21	17	25	9	21	13	~~31~~	19	EL	139	15
Ha Jee-min	Laser	8	9	15	14	36	~~50~~; ~~DNF~~	50; DSQ	28	12	17	EL	188	24
Cho Sung-min; Park Gun-woo	470	23	14	15	24	20	~~25~~	20	8	24	21	EL	169	22

M = Medal race; EL = Eliminated – did not advance into the medal race;

== Shooting ==
South Korea has ensured berths in the following events of shooting:

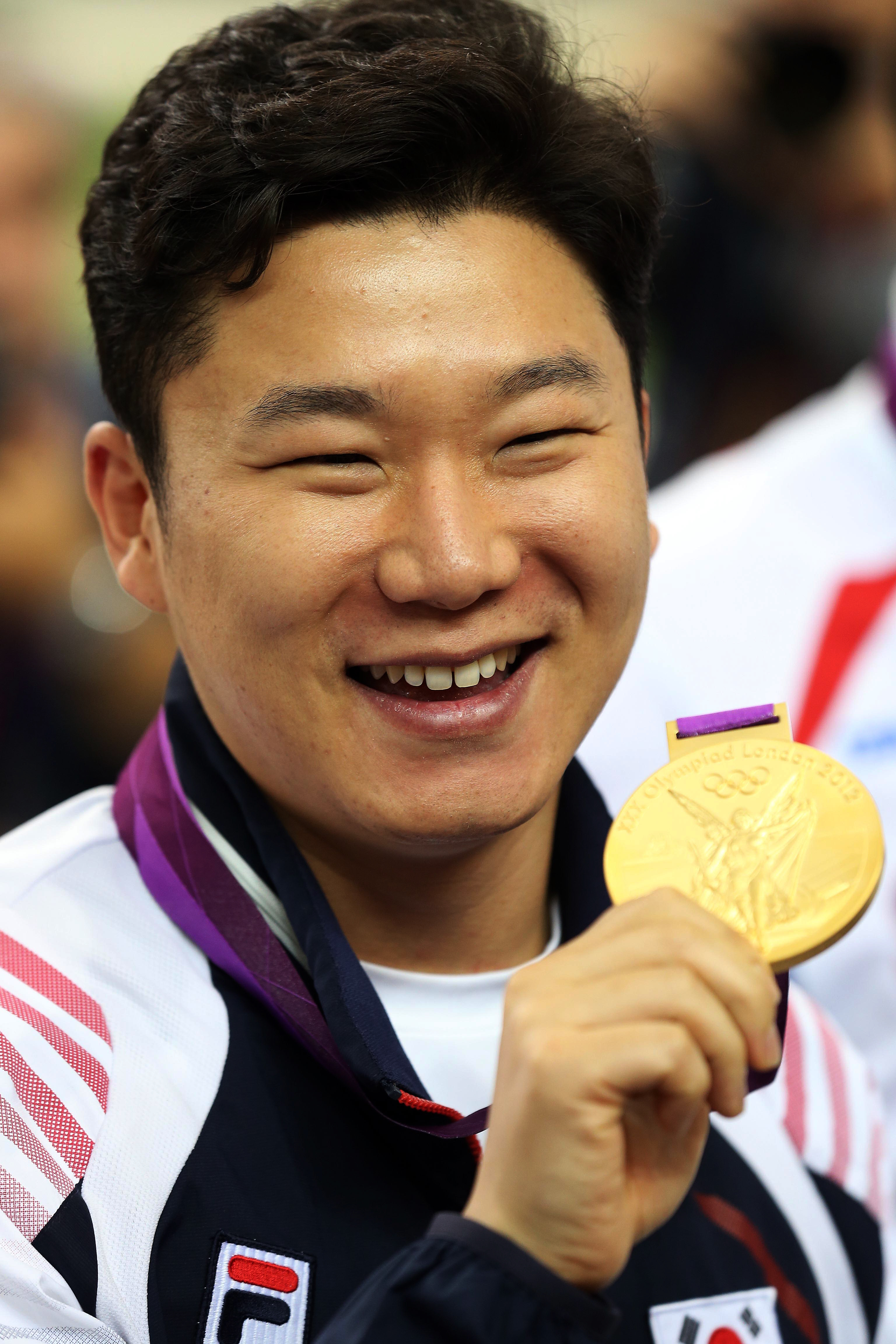
Jin Jong-oh defends his Olympic title in pistol shooting.

Men

Athlete	Event	Qualification		Final	
Athlete	Event	Score	Rank	Score	Rank
Cho Yong-seong	Skeet	109	35	Did not advance	
Choi Young-rae	10 m air pistol	569	35	Did not advance	
Choi Young-rae	50 m pistol	569	1 Q	661.5	2nd place, silver medalist(s)
Han Jin-seop	10 m air rifle	590	32	Did not advance	
Han Jin-seop	50 m rifle prone	595	5 Q	698.2	6
Han Jin-seop	50 m rifle 3 positions	1168	9	Did not advance	
Jin Jong-oh	10 m air pistol	588	1 Q	688.2	1st place, gold medalist(s)
Jin Jong-oh	50 m pistol	562	5 Q	662.0	1st place, gold medalist(s)
Kim Dae-yoong	25 m rapid fire pistol	579	10	Did not advance	
Kim Hak-man	50 m rifle prone	594	15	Did not advance	
Kim Jong-hyun	10 m air rifle	593	17	Did not advance	
Kim Jong-hyun	50 m rifle 3 positions	1171	5 Q	1272.5	2nd place, silver medalist(s)

Women

Athlete	Event	Qualification		Final	
Athlete	Event	Score	Rank	Score	Total
Jeong Mi-ra	10 m air rifle	387	51	Did not advance	
Jeong Mi-ra	50 m rifle 3 positions	581	17	Did not advance	
Kang Gee-eun	Trap	62	19	Did not advance	
Kim Byung-hee	10 m air pistol	381	17	Did not advance	
Kim Jang-mi	10 m air pistol	382	13	Did not advance	
Kim Jang-mi	25 m pistol	591	1 Q	792.4	1st place, gold medalist(s)
Kim Kyeong-ae	25 m pistol	582	11	Did not advance	
Na Yoon-kyung	10 m air rifle	394	21	Did not advance	
Na Yoon-kyung	50 m rifle 3 positions	583	10	Did not advance	

== Swimming ==
Korean swimmers have so far achieved qualifying standards in the following events (up to a maximum of 2 swimmers in each event at the Olympic Qualifying Time (OQT), and potentially 1 at the Olympic Selection Time (OST)):

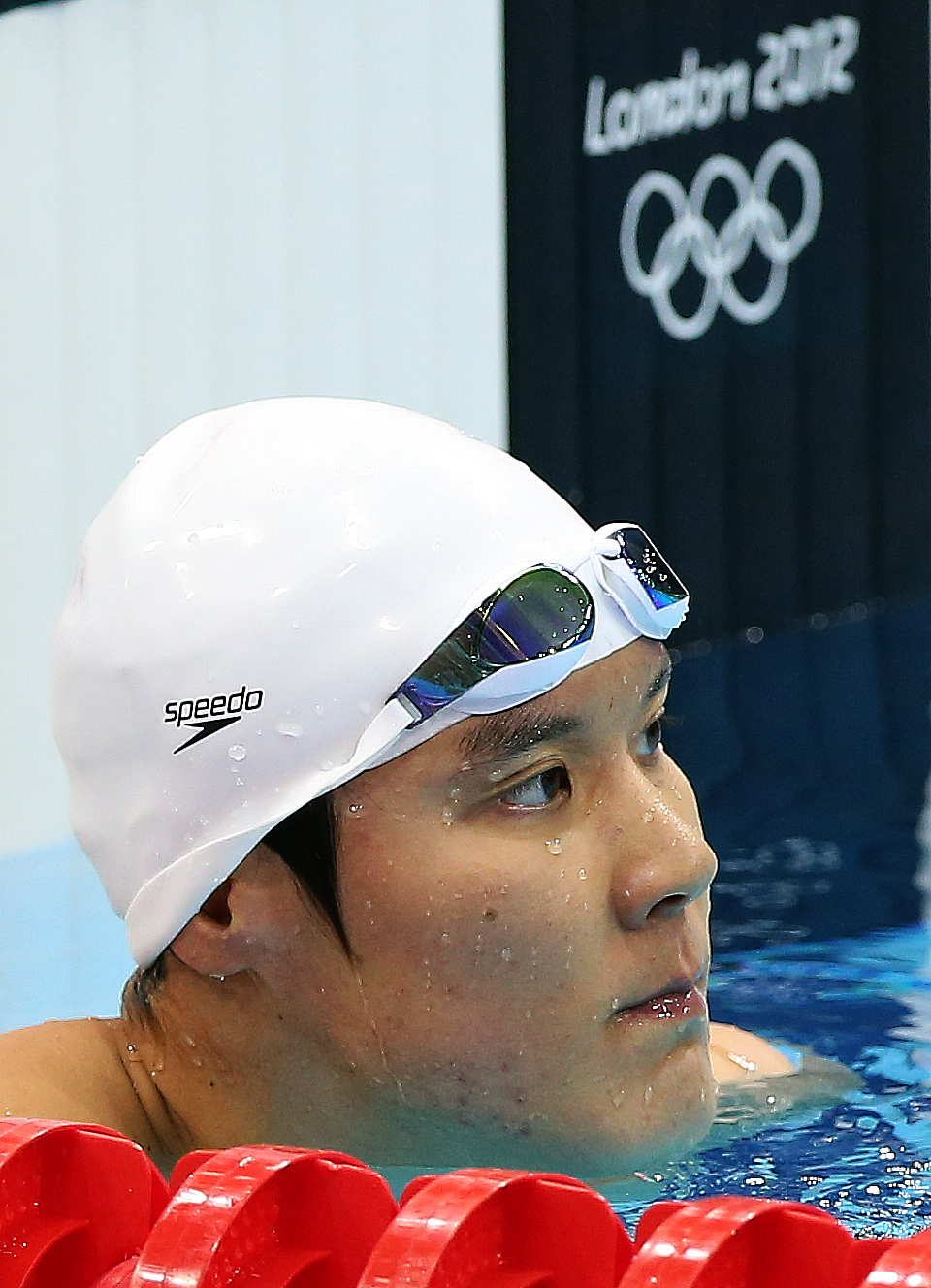
Swimmer Park Tae-Hwan has won two silver medals at the 2012 Summer Olympics.

Men

Athlete	Event	Heat		Semifinal		Final	
Athlete	Event	Time	Rank	Time	Rank	Time	Rank
Chang Gyu-cheol	100 m butterfly	52.69	25	Did not advance			
Choi Kyu-woong	200 m breaststroke	2:13.57	25	Did not advance			
Jung Won-yong	200 m individual medley	2:03.33	32	Did not advance			
Jung Won-yong	400 m individual medley	4:23.12	28	—N/a		Did not advance	
Park Hyung-joo	200 m backstroke	2:01.50	31	Did not advance			
Park Seon-kwan	100 m backstroke	55.51	36	Did not advance			
Park Tae-hwan	200 m freestyle	1:46.79	5 Q	1:46.02	3 Q	1:44.93	2nd place, silver medalist(s)
Park Tae-hwan	400 m freestyle	3:46.68	4 Q	—N/a		3:42.06	2nd place, silver medalist(s)
Park Tae-hwan	1500 m freestyle	14:56.89	6 Q	—N/a		14:50.61	4

Women

Athlete	Event	Heat		Semifinal		Final	
Athlete	Event	Time	Rank	Time	Rank	Time	Rank
Back Su-yeon	200 m breaststroke	2:25.76	=7 Q	2:24.67	9	Did not advance	
Baek Il-joo	200 m freestyle	2:04.32	33	Did not advance			
Choi Hye-ra	200 m butterfly	2:08.45	10 Q	2.08.32	14	Did not advance	
Choi Hye-ra	200 m individual medley	2:14.91	23	Did not advance			
Ham Chan-mi	200 m backstroke	2:15.30	31	Did not advance			
Han Na-kyeong	800 m freestyle	8:57.26	32	—N/a		Did not advance	
Jeong Da-rae	200 m breaststroke	2:26.83	14 Q	2:28.74	16	Did not advance	
Kim Ga-eul	400 m freestyle	4:43.46	34	—N/a		Did not advance	
Kim Hye-jin	100 m breaststroke	1:09.79	33	Did not advance			
Kim Seo-yeong	400 m individual medley	4:43.99	17	—N/a		Did not advance	

== Synchronized swimming ==
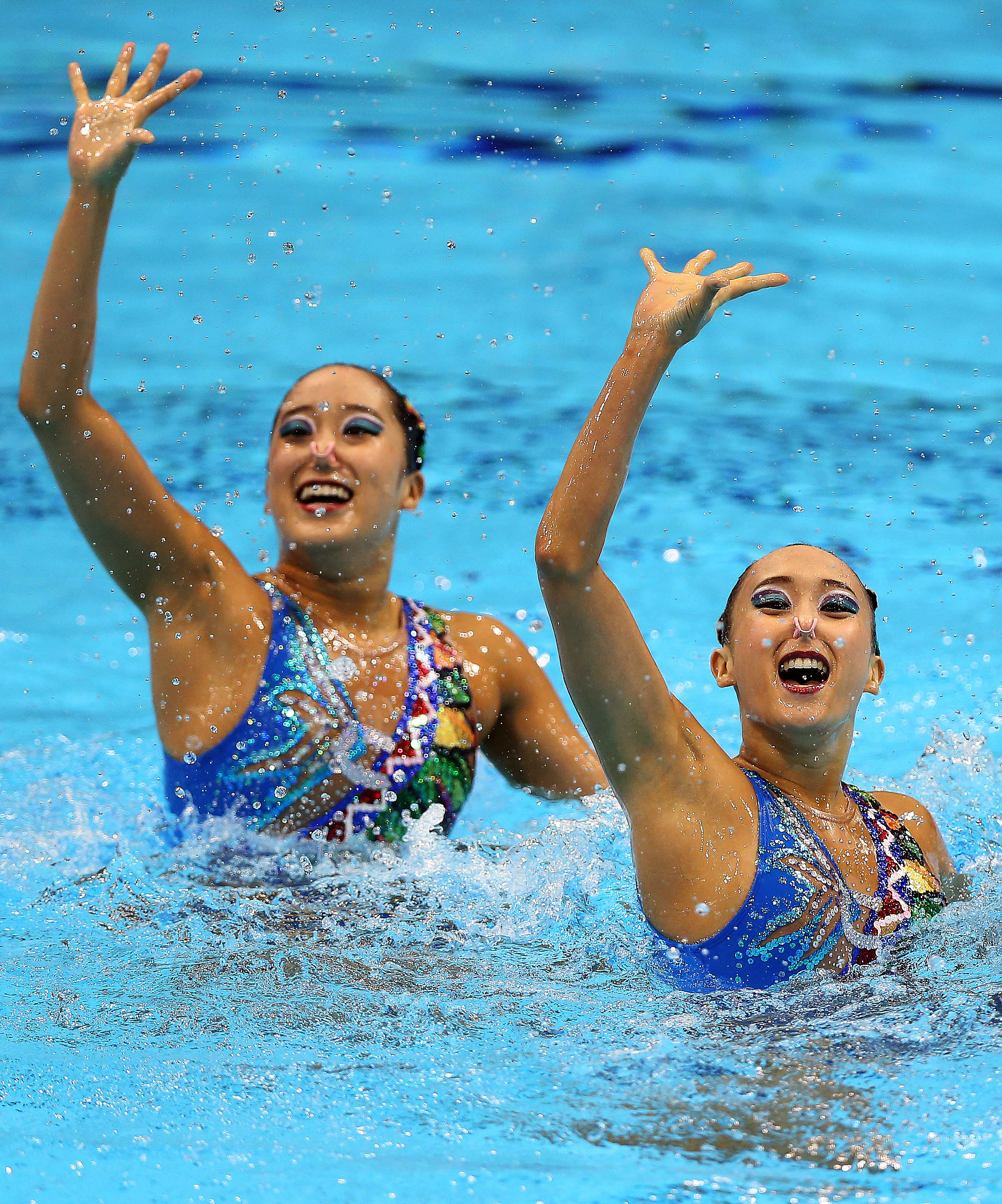
Park Hyun-Ha and Park Hyun-Sun in women's duet

South Korea has qualified 2 quota places in synchronized swimming.

Athlete	Event	Technical routine		Free routine (preliminary)			Free routine (final)		
Athlete	Event	Points	Rank	Points	Total (technical + free)	Rank	Points	Total (technical + free)	Rank
Park Hyun-ha; Park Hyun-sun	Duet	86.700	13	87.460	174.160	12 Q	87.250	173.950	12

== Table tennis ==
South Korea has qualified three men and three women.

Men

Athlete	Event	Preliminary round	Round 1	Round 2	Round 3	Round 4	Quarterfinals	Semifinals	Final / BM	
Athlete	Event	Opposition Result	Opposition Result	Opposition Result	Opposition Result	Opposition Result	Opposition Result	Opposition Result	Opposition Result	Rank
Joo Se-hyuk	Singles	Bye			Kim H-B (PRK); L (2–4)	Did not advance				
Oh Sang-eun	Singles	Bye			Freitas (POR); W (4–0)	Kishikawa (JPN); L (1–4)	Did not advance			
Joo Se-hyuk; Oh Sang-eun; Ryu Seung-min	Team	—N/a				North Korea; W (3–1)	Portugal; W (3–2)	Hong Kong; W (3–0)	China; L (0–3)	2nd place, silver medalist(s)

Women

Athlete	Event	Preliminary round	Round 1	Round 2	Round 3	Round 4	Quarterfinals	Semifinals	Final / BM	
Athlete	Event	Opposition Result	Opposition Result	Opposition Result	Opposition Result	Opposition Result	Opposition Result	Opposition Result	Opposition Result	Rank
Kim Kyung-ah	Singles	Bye			Liu J (AUT); W (4–1)	Shen Yf (ESP); W (4–1)	Feng Tw (SIN); L (2–4)	Did not advance		
Park Mi-young	Singles	Bye			Póta (HUN); W (4–1)	Li Xx (CHN); L (1–4)	Did not advance			
Dang Ye-seo; Kim Kyung-ah; Park Mi-young	Team	—N/a				Brazil; W (3–0)	Hong Kong; W (3–0)	China; L (0–3)	Singapore; L (0–3)	4

== Taekwondo ==
South Korea has ensured berths in the following events of taekwondo by reaching the top 3 of the 2011 WTF World Qualification Tournament:

Athlete	Event	Round of 16	Quarterfinals	Semifinals	Repechage	Bronze Medal	Final	
Athlete	Event	Opposition Result	Opposition Result	Opposition Result	Opposition Result	Opposition Result	Opposition Result	Rank
Lee Dae-hoon	Men's −58 kg	Karaket (THA); W 8–7 SDP	Bayoumi (EGY); W 11–10 SDP	Denisenko (RUS); W 7–6	Bye		González (ESP); L 8–17	2nd place, silver medalist(s)
Cha Dong-min	Men's +80 kg	Trajkovic (SLO); W 9–4	Tanrıkulu (TUR); L 1–4	Did not advance				
Hwang Kyung-seon	Women's −67 kg	Gbagbi (CIV); W 4–1	Fromm (GER); W 8–4	Anić (SLO); W 7–0	Bye		Tatar (TUR); W 12–5	1st place, gold medalist(s)
Lee In-jong	Women's +67 kg	Falavigna (BRA); W 13–9	Graffe (FRA); L 4–7	Did not advance	Mamatova (UZB); W 8–1	Baryshnikova (RUS); L 6–7	Did not advance	5

== Triathlon ==
South Korea has qualified the following athletes.

Athlete	Event	Swim (1.5 km)	Trans 1	Bike (40 km)	Trans 2	Run (10 km)	Total Time	Rank
Heo Min-ho	Men's	18:02	0:38	59:46	0:28	35:36	1:54:30	54

== Volleyball ==
South Korea has qualified a women's team for the indoor tournament.

=== Women's tournament ===
Team roster

The following is the Korean roster in the women's volleyball tournament of the 2012 Summer Olympics.

Head coach: Kim Hyung-sil

№	Name	Date of birth	Height	Weight	Spike	Block	2012 club
3	Ha Yu-jeong	26 December 1989	1.89 m (6 ft 2 in)	74 kg (163 lb)	287 cm (113 in)	281 cm (111 in)	(South Korea) Korea Expressway Corporation
4	Kim Sa-nee (c)	21 June 1981	1.80 m (5 ft 11 in)	75 kg (165 lb)	302 cm (119 in)	292 cm (115 in)	(South Korea) Heungkuk Life
5	Kim Hae-ran (L)	16 March 1984	1.68 m (5 ft 6 in)	60 kg (130 lb)	280 cm (110 in)	270 cm (110 in)	(South Korea) Korea Expressway Corporation
7	Lim Hyo-sook	26 April 1982	1.77 m (5 ft 10 in)	75 kg (165 lb)	278 cm (109 in)	270 cm (110 in)	(South Korea) Korea Expressway Corporation
10	Kim Yeon-koung	26 February 1988	1.92 m (6 ft 4 in)	73 kg (161 lb)	307 cm (121 in)	299 cm (118 in)	(Turkey) Fenerbahçe
11	Han Yoo-mi	5 February 1982	1.80 m (5 ft 11 in)	65 kg (143 lb)	307 cm (121 in)	297 cm (117 in)	(South Korea) Korea Ginseng Corporation
12	Han Song-yi	5 September 1984	1.86 m (6 ft 1 in)	65 kg (143 lb)	305 cm (120 in)	298 cm (117 in)	(South Korea) GS Caltex
13	Jung Dae-young	12 August 1981	1.83 m (6 ft 0 in)	71 kg (157 lb)	303 cm (119 in)	292 cm (115 in)	(South Korea) GS Caltex
14	Hwang Youn-joo	13 August 1986	1.77 m (5 ft 10 in)	68 kg (150 lb)	303 cm (119 in)	294 cm (116 in)	(South Korea) Hyundai E&C
17	Yang Hyo-jin	14 December 1989	1.90 m (6 ft 3 in)	72 kg (159 lb)	287 cm (113 in)	280 cm (110 in)	(South Korea) Hyundai E&C
19	Kim Hee-jin	29 April 1991	1.85 m (6 ft 1 in)	77 kg (170 lb)	300 cm (120 in)	295 cm (116 in)	(South Korea) IBK Altos
20	Lee Sook-ja	17 June 1980	1.75 m (5 ft 9 in)	58 kg (128 lb)	286 cm (113 in)	264 cm (104 in)	(South Korea) GS Caltex

Group play

Pos	Team	Pld	W	L	Pts	SW	SL	SR	SPW	SPL	SPR	Qualification
1	United States	5	5	0	15	15	2	7.500	426	345	1.235	Quarter-finals
2	China	5	3	2	9	11	10	1.100	475	461	1.030	Quarter-finals
3	South Korea	5	2	3	8	11	10	1.100	449	452	0.993	Quarter-finals
4	Brazil	5	3	2	7	10	10	1.000	447	420	1.064	Quarter-finals
5	Turkey	5	2	3	6	9	11	0.818	434	443	0.980	
6	Serbia	5	0	5	0	2	15	0.133	297	407	0.730	

28 July 2012; 20:00	United States	3–1	South Korea	Earls Court Exhibition Centre, London; Attendance: 14,000; Referees: Janpen Jirakakul (THA), Georgios Karampetsos (GRE)
28 July 2012; 20:00	(25–19, 25–17, 20–25, 25–21) result statistics			Earls Court Exhibition Centre, London; Attendance: 14,000; Referees: Janpen Jirakakul (THA), Georgios Karampetsos (GRE)

30 July 2012; 11:30	Serbia	1–3	South Korea	Earls Court Exhibition Centre, London; Attendance: 7,500; Referees: Brian McDougall (GBR), Simone Santi (ITA)
30 July 2012; 11:30	(12–25, 16–25, 25–16, 21–25) result statistics			Earls Court Exhibition Centre, London; Attendance: 7,500; Referees: Brian McDougall (GBR), Simone Santi (ITA)

1 August 2012; 22:00	Brazil	0–3	South Korea	Earls Court Exhibition Centre, London; Attendance: 11,000; Referees: Mitchell Davidson (CAN), Mitchell Salvatore (USA)
1 August 2012; 22:00	(23–25, 21–25, 21–25) result statistics			Earls Court Exhibition Centre, London; Attendance: 11,000; Referees: Mitchell Davidson (CAN), Mitchell Salvatore (USA)

3 August 2012; 14:45	Turkey	3–2	South Korea	Earls Court Exhibition Centre, London; Attendance: 13,500; Referees: Simone Santi (ITA), Brian McDougall (GBR)
3 August 2012; 14:45	(25–16, 21–25, 25–18, 19–25, 15–12) result statistics			Earls Court Exhibition Centre, London; Attendance: 13,500; Referees: Simone Santi (ITA), Brian McDougall (GBR)

5 August 2012; 11:30	China	3–2	South Korea	Earls Court Exhibition Centre, London; Attendance: 12,000; Referees: Janpen Jirakul (THA), Frans Loderus (NED)
5 August 2012; 11:30	(28–26, 22–25, 25–19, 22–25, 15–10) result statistics			Earls Court Exhibition Centre, London; Attendance: 12,000; Referees: Janpen Jirakul (THA), Frans Loderus (NED)

Quarter-final

7 August 2012; 21:00	Italy	1–3	South Korea	Earls Court Exhibition Centre, London; Attendance: 13,000; Referees: Rolando Cholakian (ARG), Jose Mercado (PUR)
7 August 2012; 21:00	(25–18, 21–25, 20–25, 18–25) result statistics			Earls Court Exhibition Centre, London; Attendance: 13,000; Referees: Rolando Cholakian (ARG), Jose Mercado (PUR)

Semi-final

9 August 2012; 15:00	South Korea	0–3	United States	Earls Court Exhibition Centre, London; Attendance: 14,000; Referees: Rolando Cholakian (ARG), Brian McDougall (GBR)
9 August 2012; 15:00	(20–25, 22–25, 22–25) result statistics			Earls Court Exhibition Centre, London; Attendance: 14,000; Referees: Rolando Cholakian (ARG), Brian McDougall (GBR)

Bronze medal match

11 August 2012; 11:30	(bronze) Japan	3–0	South Korea	Earls Court Exhibition Centre, London; Attendance: 13,500; Referees: Suzana Rodriguez (ESP), Jose Mercado (PUR)
11 August 2012; 11:30	(25–22, 26–24, 25–21) result statistics			Earls Court Exhibition Centre, London; Attendance: 13,500; Referees: Suzana Rodriguez (ESP), Jose Mercado (PUR)

== Weightlifting ==
South Korea has qualified 6 men and 4 women.

Men

Athlete	Event	Snatch		Clean & Jerk		Total	Rank
Athlete	Event	Result	Rank	Result	Rank	Total	Rank
Ji Hun-min	−62 kg	130	7	~~162~~	DNF	162	DNF
Won Jeong-sik	−69 kg	144	9	178	6	322	7
Sa Jae-hyouk	−77 kg	158	3	—	—	158	DNF*
Kim Min-jae	−94 kg	185	1	210	8	395	2nd place, silver medalist(s)
Kim Hwa-seung	−105 kg	~~178~~	DNF	—	—	—	DNF
Jeon Sang-guen	+105 kg	190	10	246	2	436	3rd place, bronze medalist(s)

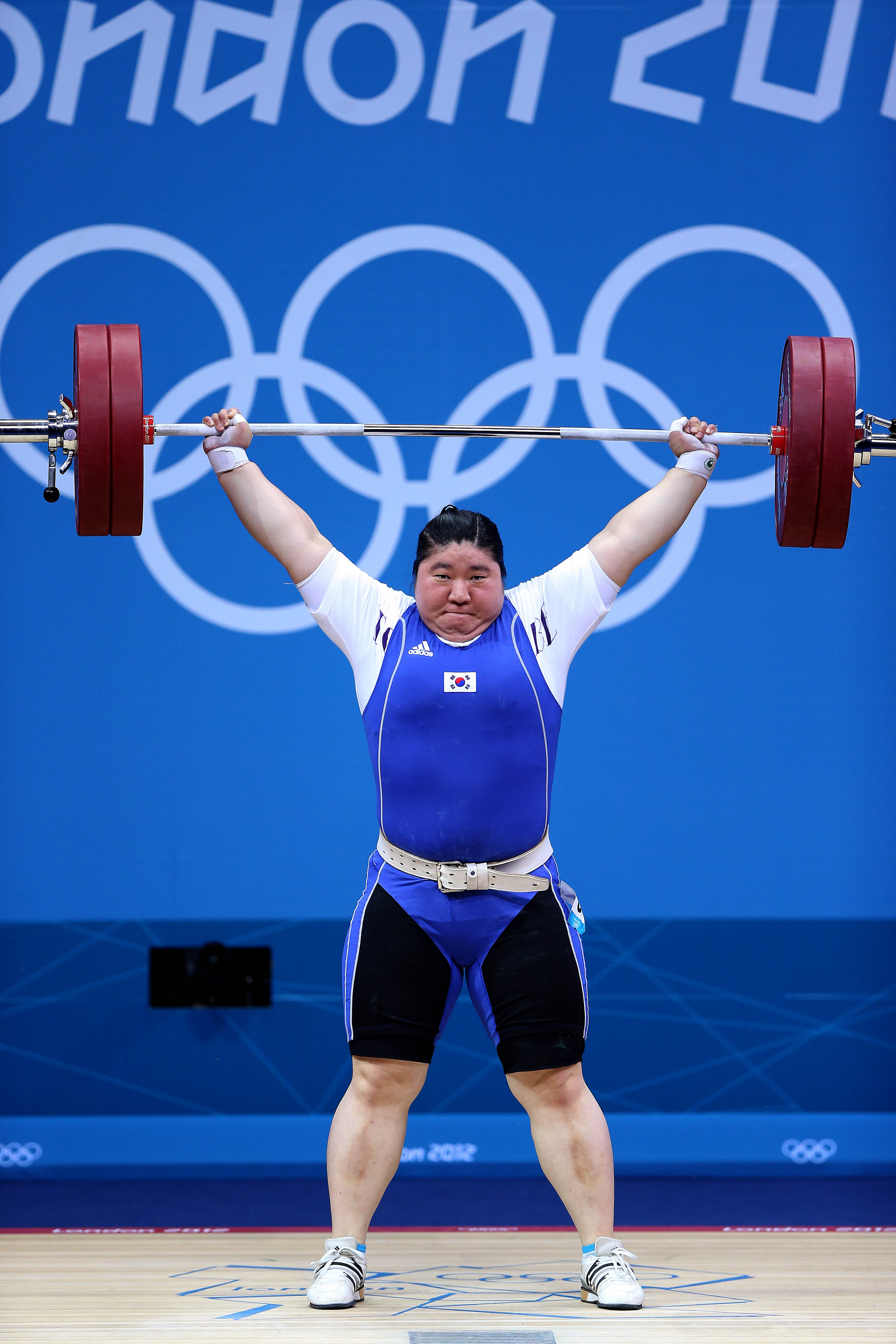
Defending Olympic champion Jang Mi-Ran in women's +75 kg.

Women

Athlete	Event	Snatch		Clean & Jerk		Total	Rank
Athlete	Event	Result	Rank	Result	Rank	Total	Rank
Yang Eun-hye	−58 kg	87	17	113	14	200	14
Mun Yu-ra	−69 kg	~~102~~	DNF	—	—	—	DNF
Lim Ji-hye	−75 kg	97	9	126	10	223	10
Jang Mi-ran	+75 kg	125	5	164	4	289	3rd place, bronze medalist(s)

* Sa Jae-Hyouk was forced to retire from the competition after he dislocated his elbow during his second snatch attempt.

== Wrestling ==
South Korea has so far qualified the following quota places.

Key:

- VT – Victory by Fall.
- PP – Decision by Points – the loser with technical points.
- PO – Decision by Points – the loser without technical points.

Men's freestyle

Athlete	Event	Qualification	Round of 16	Quarterfinal	Semifinal	Repechage 1	Repechage 2	Final / BM	
Athlete	Event	Opposition Result	Opposition Result	Opposition Result	Opposition Result	Opposition Result	Opposition Result	Opposition Result	Rank
Kim Jin-cheol	−55 kg	Bye	Yumoto (JPN); L 1–3 ^{PP}	Did not advance					11
Lee Seung-chul	−60 kg	Bye	Scott (USA); L 0–3 ^{PO}	Did not advance					18

Men's Greco-Roman

Athlete	Event	Qualification	Round of 16	Quarterfinal	Semifinal	Repechage 1	Repechage 2	Final / BM	
Athlete	Event	Opposition Result	Opposition Result	Opposition Result	Opposition Result	Opposition Result	Opposition Result	Opposition Result	Rank
Choi Gyu-jin	−55 kg	Bye	Yun W-C (PRK); W 3–0 ^{PO}	Balart (CUB); W 3–1 ^{PP}	Bayramov (AZE); L 1–3 ^{PP}	Bye		Semenov (RUS); L 0–3 ^{PO}	5
Jung Ji-hyun	−60 kg	Bye	Meoque (CUB); W 3–0 ^{PO}	Aliyev (AZE); L 0–3 ^{PO}	Did not advance				8
Kim Hyeon-woo	−66 kg	Varderesyan (ARM); W 3–0 ^{PO}	Mulens (CUB); W 3–0 ^{PO}	Venckaitis (LTU); W 3–0 ^{PO}	Guénot (FRA); W 3–1 ^{PP}	Bye		Lőrincz (HUN); W 3–0 ^{PO}	1st place, gold medalist(s)
Kim Jin-hyeok	−74 kg	Datunashvili (GEO); L 0–3 ^{PO}	Did not advance						19
Lee Se-yeol	−84 kg	Hrustanović (AUT); L 0–3 ^{PO}	Did not advance						18

Women's freestyle

Athlete	Event	Qualification	Round of 16	Quarterfinal	Semifinal	Repechage 1	Repechage 2	Final / BM	
Athlete	Event	Opposition Result	Opposition Result	Opposition Result	Opposition Result	Opposition Result	Opposition Result	Opposition Result	Rank
Kim Hyung-joo	−48 kg	Bye	Merleni (UKR); L 1–3 ^{PP}	Did not advance					13
Um Ji-eun	−55 kg	Amri (TUN); L 0–5 ^{VT}	Did not advance						14
