= Maya Lawrence =

American fencer

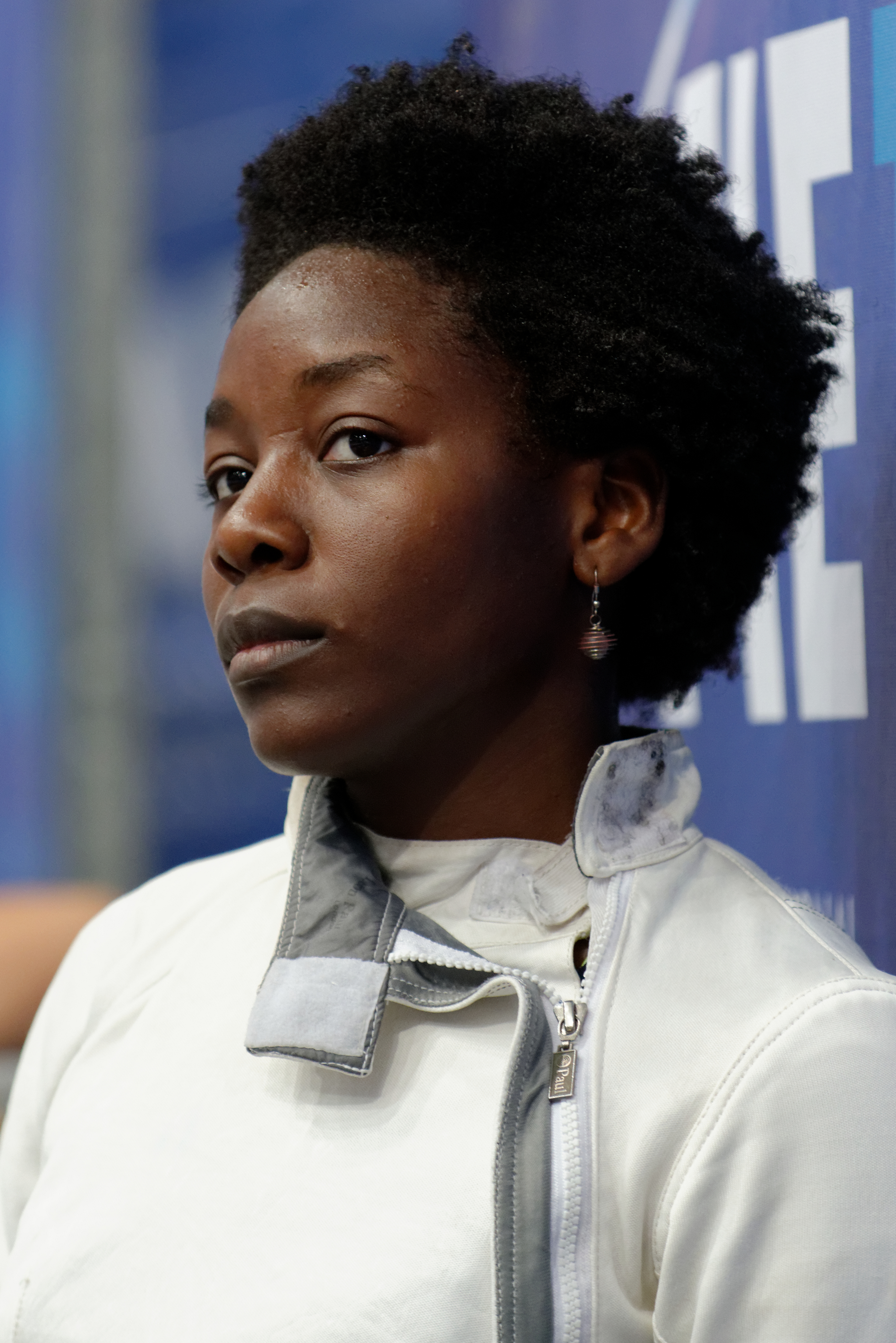
- Lawrence at the 2013 World Fencing Championships

Personal information
- Nationality: American
- Born: 17 July 1980 (age 46)
- Height: 1.70 m (5 ft 7 in)
- Weight: 64 kg (141 lb)

Sport
- Country: United States
- Sport: Fencing
- College team: Princeton University
- Coached by: Michel Sebastiani
Medal record
Representing United States
Women's Fencing
Olympic Games
Bronze medal – third place	2012 London	Team épée

Maya Lawrence (born 1980) is an American fencer and was part of the United States Fencing Team at the 2012 Summer Olympics in London, where she competed in the individual and team épée events in the fencing competition. She won a bronze medal in the women's team épée alongside Courtney Hurley, Kelley Hurley, and Susie Scanlan.

== Biography ==
Lawrence grew up in Teaneck, New Jersey and attended Teaneck High School, where she took up fencing as a sophomore before graduating in 1998. Her parents are Pat Lawrence, Teaneck High School's fencing coach, and Reginald Lawrence, who has been a sports official in New Jersey.

In 2002, Lawrence graduated with honors from Princeton University with a double major in political science and African-American studies. A member of Princeton's fencing team, she was selected as an All-American and earned Ivy League honors during all four years of her attendance there. While at Princeton and after graduating, she was coached by Michel Sebastiani.

She earned a master's degree in English as a Second Language instruction in 2007 from Teachers College, Columbia University. While studying for her degree, she continued to fence.

Lawrence competed as part of the United States Fencing Team at the 2012 London Olympics in the individual and team épée events in the fencing competition. She won a bronze medal in the women's team épée, alongside Courtney Hurley, Kelley Hurley, and Susie Scanlan.

== See also ==
- List of Princeton University Olympians
- List of Olympic medalists in fencing (women)
- List of USFA Hall of Fame members
