= Fencing at the 2012 Summer Olympics – Women's team épée =

Women's team épée at the Games of the XXX Olympiad
- Venue: ExCeL Exhibition Centre
- Date: 4 August 2012
- Competitors: 31 from 8 nations

Medalists
1st place, gold medalist(s)		Li Na; Luo Xiaojuan; Sun Yujie; Xu Anqi	China
2nd place, silver medalist(s)		Shin A-Lam; Jung Hyo-Jung; Choi In-Jeong; Choi Eun-Sook	South Korea
3rd place, bronze medalist(s)		Maya Lawrence; Courtney Hurley; Kelley Hurley; Susie Scanlan	United States

The women's team épée competition in fencing at the 2012 Olympic Games in London was held on 4 August at the ExCeL Exhibition Centre.

== Competition format ==
This team event featured eight national teams. Great Britain, as hosts were allowed to enter a team in any event they chose, however they chose not to enter this event. First-round losers continued fencing bouts to determine the rankings for fifth through eighth spots, while the quarter-final winners met in the semi-finals. The winners of the semi-final bouts competed for the gold medal, while the losing teams competed for the bronze.

Team events were competed to a maximum of 45 touches. In the event of a tie, a one-minute playoff occurred. Should any team make a touch, they would be declared the winner, however if both teams touch in the same play then there would not be any addition to the total score.

== Schedule ==
All times are British Summer Time (UTC+1)

Date	Time	Round
Saturday, 4 August 2012	10:30	Quarter-finals
Saturday, 4 August 2012	12:00	Placement 5-8
Saturday, 4 August 2012	13:30	Semi-finals
Saturday, 4 August 2012	15:00	Placement 5-6
Saturday, 4 August 2012	15:00	Placement 7-8
Saturday, 4 August 2012	18:00	Bronze medal match
Saturday, 4 August 2012	19:15	Final

== Draw ==
=== Finals ===
Quarter-finals
1	Romania	38
8	South Korea	45
5	United States	45
4	Italy	35
3	China	45
6	Germany	42
7	Ukraine	34
2	Russia	45

Semi-finals
8	South Korea	45
5	United States	36
3	China	20 OT
2	Russia	19

Finals
8	South Korea	25
3	China	39
Third place
5	United States	31 OT
2	Russia	30

=== Classification 5–8 ===
Placement 5-8
1	Romania	45
4	Italy	38
6	Germany	45
7	Ukraine	36

Placement 5-6
1	Romania	36
6	Germany	45
Placement 7-8
4	Italy	45
7	Ukraine	40

== Final classification ==
Rank	Team	Athlete
1st place, gold medalist(s)	China	Li Na; Luo Xiaojuan; Sun Yujie; Xu Anqi
2nd place, silver medalist(s)	South Korea	Choi In-Jeong; Jung Hyo-Jung; Shin A-Lam; Choi Eun-Sook
3rd place, bronze medalist(s)	United States	Courtney Hurley; Maya Lawrence; Susie Scanlan; Kelley Hurley
4	Russia	Violetta Kolobova; Lyubov Shutova; Anna Sivkova; Tatiana Logounova
5	Germany	Imke Duplitzer; Britta Heidemann; Monika Sozanska
6	Romania	Ana Maria Brânză; Simona Gherman; Anca Măroiu; Loredana Dinu
7	Italy	Bianca Del Carretto; Rossella Fiamingo; Mara Navarria; Nathalie Moellhausen
8	Ukraine	Olena Kryvytska; Kseniya Pantelyeyeva; Yana Shemyakina; Anfisa Pochkalova
