= Susie Scanlan =

American fencer (born 1990)

Personal information
- Full name: Susannah Scanlan
- Nationality: American
- Born: June 4, 1990 (age 36) St. Paul, Minnesota, USA
- Height: 5 ft 8 in (1.73 m)
- Weight: 130 lb (59 kg)

Sport
- Country: United States of America
- Sport: Fencing
- Event(s): individual epee, team epee
Medal record
Fencing
Representing United States
Olympic Games
| Bronze medal – third place | 2012 London | women's team épée |

Susie Scanlan (born June 4, 1990, in St. Paul, Minnesota ) is an American epee fencer. Scanlan was named to the U.S. Olympic team at the 2012 Summer Olympics in the women's epee individual and team competitions, and won a bronze medal in the team event. Scanlan took time off from her studies at Princeton University to train for and compete in the 2012 Olympics.

Scanlan was eliminated in the individual epee round of 64 by Olena Kryvytska of Ukraine by a score of 15–13. She won a bronze medal in the women's team épée alongside Maya Lawrence, Courtney Hurley, and Kelley Hurley.

== See also ==
- List of Princeton University Olympians
