= Women's team épée at the 2018 World Fencing Championships =

- Venue: Wuxi Sports Center Indoor Stadium
- Location: Wuxi, China
- Dates: 24 July; 25 July
- Competitors: 104 from 26 nations

Medalists
gold medal	Katharine Holmes; Courtney Hurley; Kelley Hurley; Amanda Sirico	United States
silver medal	Choi In-jeong; Kang Young-mi; Lee Hye-in; Shin A-lam	South Korea
bronze medal	Lin Sheng; Sun Yiwen; Xu Chengzi; Zhu Mingye	China

The Women's team épée event of the 2018 World Fencing Championships was held on 24 and 25 July 2018.

== Draw ==
=== Finals ===
Semifinals
China	21
South Korea	25
Russia	25
United States	27

Final
South Korea	17
United States	18
Third place
China	45
Russia	42

=== Top half ===
==== Section 1 ====
Round of 32
Israel	40
Canada	45
Germany	45
Thailand	30
Lithuania	19
Italy	45

Round of 16
China	45
Canada	34
Germany	42
Italy	36

Quarterfinals
China	45
Germany	36

==== Section 2 ====
Round of 32
Egypt	35
Romania	45
Hungary	45
Switzerland	31

Round of 16
South Korea	36
Romania	30
Hungary	23
France	45

Quarterfinals
South Korea	45
France	40

=== Bottom half ===
==== Section 3 ====
Round of 32
Singapore	30
Spain	38
Ukraine	w/o
Venezuela

Round of 16
Russia	40
Spain	21
Ukraine	37
Poland	45

Quarterfinals
Russia	38
Poland	37

==== Section 4 ====
Round of 32
United States	w/o
DR Congo
Australia	29
Hong Kong	45
Japan	45
Sweden	29

Round of 16
United States	45
Hong Kong	30
Japan	32
Estonia	43

Quarterfinals
United States	24
Estonia	23

=== Placement rounds ===
==== 5–8th place bracket ====
5–8th place semifinals
Germany	38
France	45
Poland	33
Estonia	43

Fifth place
France	45
Estonia	40
Seventh place
Germany	33
Poland	45

==== 9–16th place bracket ====
9–16th place quarterfinals
Canada	24
Italy	45
Romania	45
Hungary	38
Spain	40
Ukraine	45
Hong Kong	45
Japan	39

9–12th place semifinals
Italy	27
Romania	26
Ukraine	45
Hong Kong	42

Ninth place
Italy	45
Ukraine	32
Eleventh place
Romania	24
Hong Kong	32

==== 13–16th place bracket ====
13–16th place semifinals
Canada	35
Hungary	45
Spain	36
Japan	45

13th place
Hungary	45
Japan	43
15th place
Canada	45
Spain	35
