= Courtney Hurley =

American fencer (born 1990)

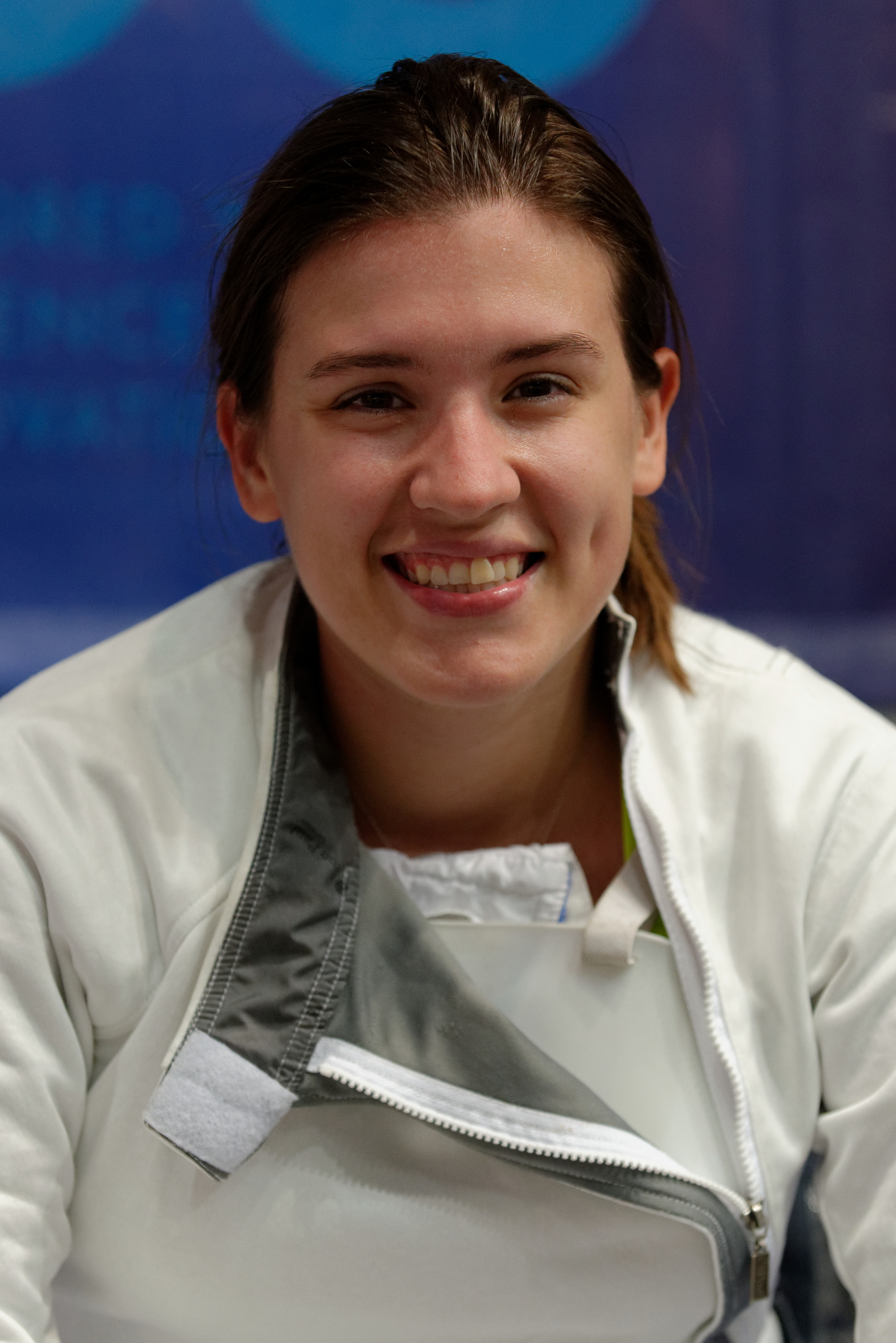
- At the 2013 World Fencing Championships

Personal information
- Born: September 30, 1990 (age 35) Houston, Texas, U.S.
- Height: 1.73 m (5 ft 8 in)
- Weight: 73 kg (161 lb)

Fencing career
- Sport: Fencing
- Weapon: Épée
- Hand: right-handed
- Club: Alliance Fencing Academy, Notre Dame Fighting Irish
- FIE ranking: current ranking
Medal record
Women's fencing
Representing United States
Olympic Games
Bronze medal – third place	2012 London	Team
World Championships
Gold medal – first place	2018 Wuxi	Team
Bronze medal – third place	2018 Wuxi	Individual

Courtney Hurley (born September 30, 1990) is an American fencer. She won a bronze medal in the women's team épée alongside Maya Lawrence, Susie Scanlan, and Kelley Hurley at the 2012 Summer Olympics. A standout at the University of Notre Dame, she was a 4-time All-American.

Coached by her father, Bob Hurley, Courtney has competed since age 15 with her older sister Kelley internationally: at the 2012 Summer Olympics, they were the part of the first U.S. Women's Épée Team to earn an Olympic medal, a bronze. Both she and her sister also competed in the 2020 Summer Olympics in Tokyo (actually held in 2021), and the 2016 Summer Olympics in Rio de Janeiro. They competed in the Women's Épée Team event in both Rio and Tokyo, finishing 5th both times. Both sisters also competed in the individual épée in both Rio and Tokyo, but neither won a medal.

== See also ==
- List of USFA Division I National Champions
- List of NCAA fencing champions
