= Jang Sin-kweon =

South Korean long-distance runner

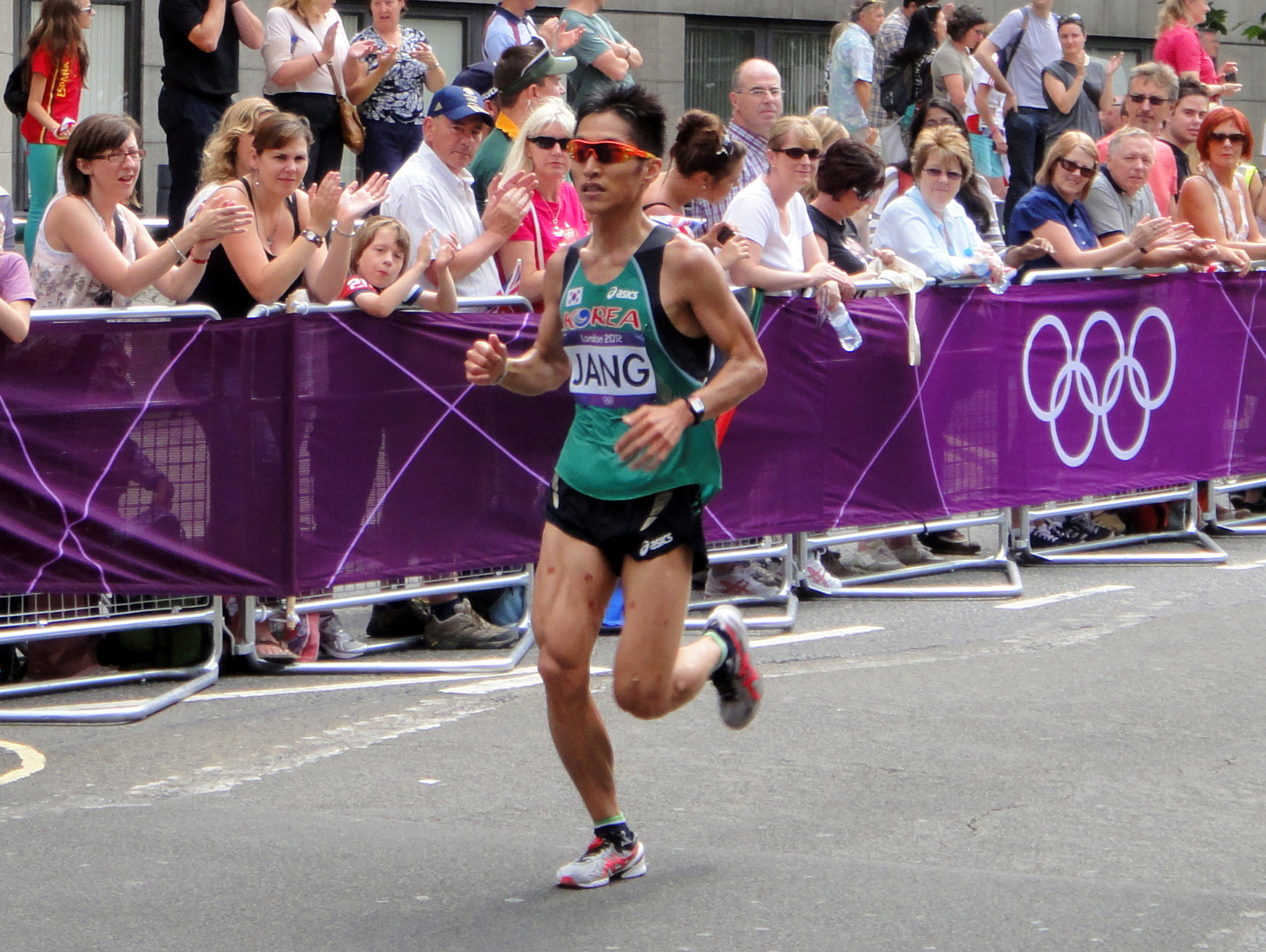
- Sinkweon Jang in the marathon at the 2012 Summer Olympics in London

Personal information
- Born: March 7, 1983 (age 42) Gyeonggi, South Korea
- Height: 1.82 m (5 ft 11 1/2 in)
- Weight: 76 kg (168 lb)

Sport
- Country: South Korea
- Sport: Athletics
- Event: Marathon

- Jang Sin-kweon
- Hangul: 장신권
- RR: Jang Singwon
- MR: Chang Sin'gwŏn

Sinkweon Jang is a South Korean long-distance runner. At the 2012 Summer Olympics, he competed in the Men's marathon, finishing in 73rd place.

He won the first gold medal at the 2015 Korean National Sports Festival in the marathon.
