= Choi Eun-sook =

South Korean fencer (born 1986)

Choi Eun-Sook
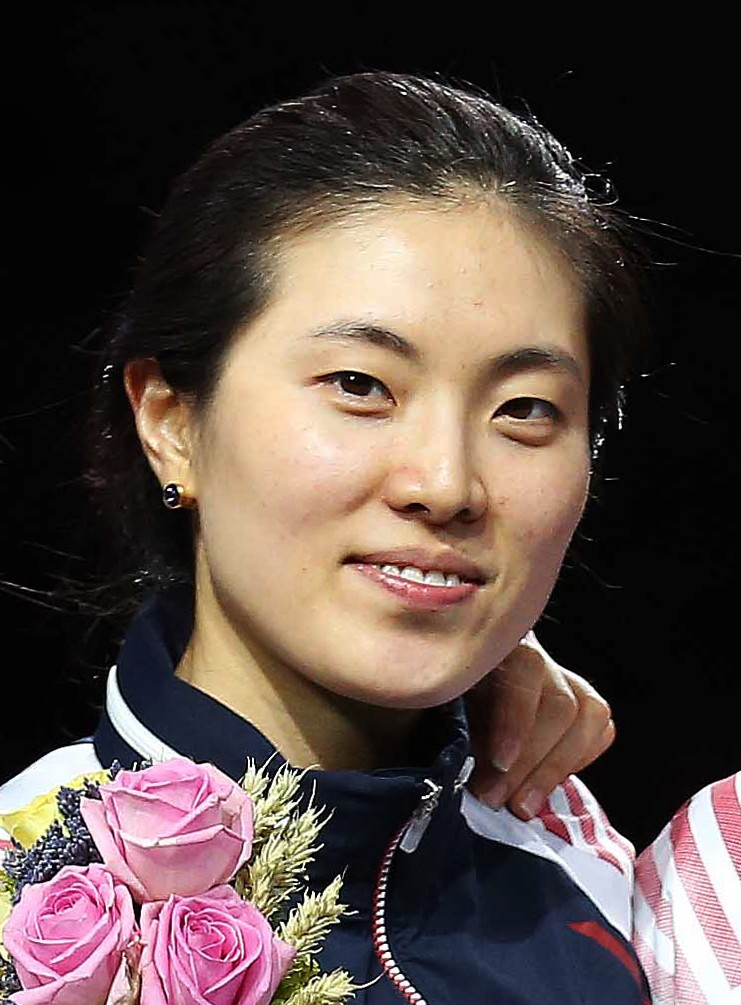

Personal information
- Native name: 최은숙
- Nationality: South Korean
- Born: February 28, 1986 (age 40) Gwangju, South Korea
- Height: 169 cm (5 ft 7 in)
- Weight: 62 kg (137 lb)

Sport
- Country: South Korea
- Sport: Fencing
- Event: Épée
Medal record
Women's fencing
Olympic Games
Silver medal – second place	2012 London	Team épée
Universiade
Silver medal – second place	2013 Kazan	Team Épée
Asian Games
Silver medal – second place	2006 Doha	Team épée
Asian Championships
Silver medal – second place	2011 Seoul	Team épée
Silver medal – second place	2012 Wakayama	Team épée

Choi Eun-Sook (Korean: 최은숙; Hanja: 崔恩淑; Korean pronunciation: [tɕʰwe̞.ɯn.suk̚]; born February 28, 1986, in Gwangju) is a South Korean épée fencer.

== Biography ==
Choi first drew attention at the 2005 World Junior Fencing Championships where she won the silver medal in the women's individual épée, losing to Sophie Lamon of Switzerland 15–12 in the final. The following year, Choi became runner-up again at the 2006 World Junior Fencing Championships, losing to Tiffany Géroudet of Switzerland 15–11 in the gold medal match.

In 2005 Choi earned her first call-up to the South Korean senior national team to compete at the 2005 World Fencing Championships. After the 2006 Asian Games where she won silver in the women's épée team event, however, Choi was not regularly selected for the national team until the 2011 season.

She competed as a substituteat the 2012 Summer Olympics in the Women's épée team event, where South Korea won the silver medal.
