= Kelley Hurley =

American fencer (born 1988)

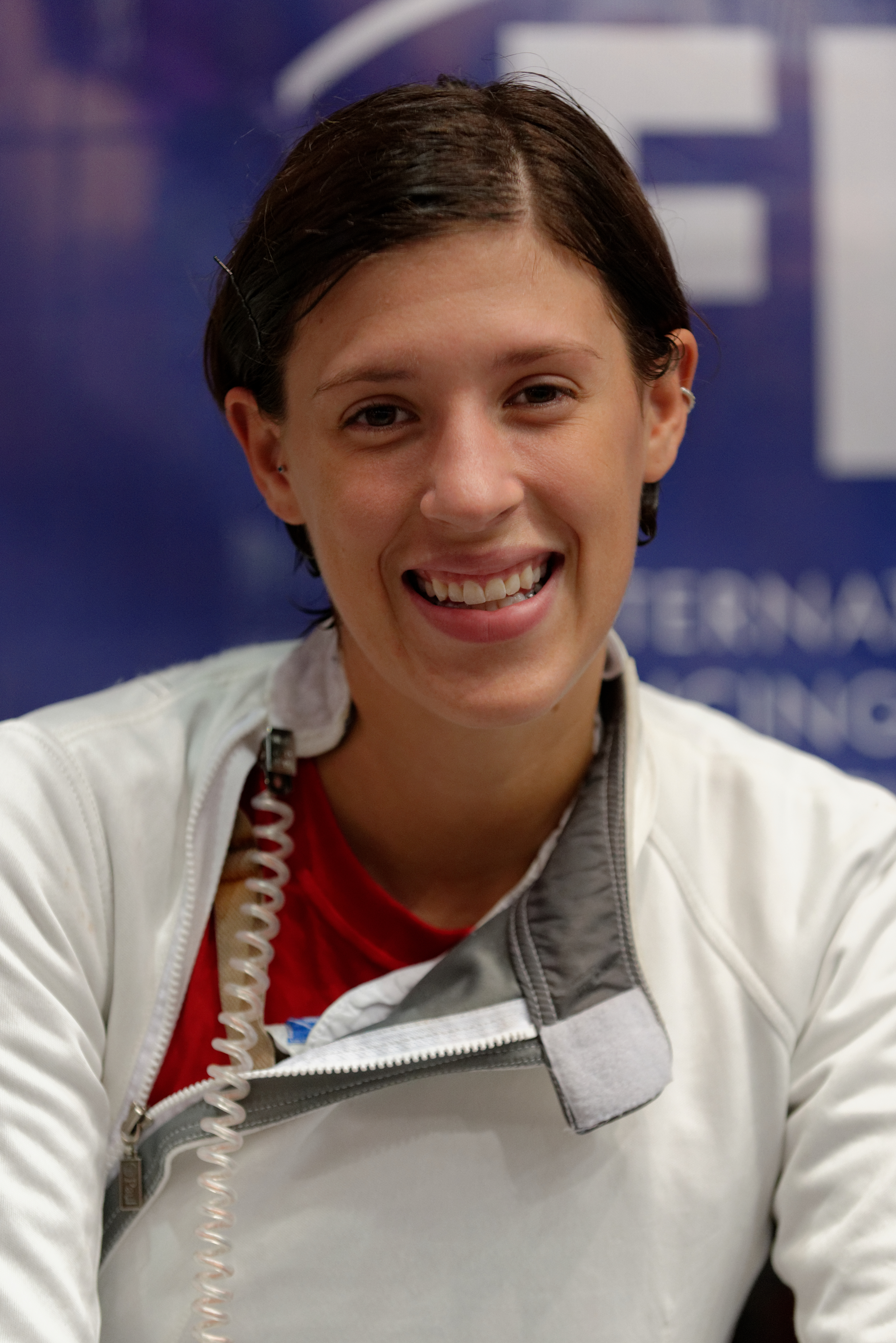
- Hurley at the 2013 World Fencing Championships

Personal information
- Nationality: American
- Born: April 4, 1988 (age 38) Houston, Texas

Sport
- Country: United States
- Sport: Fencing
- Event: Épée
Medal record
Women's fencing
Representing the United States
Olympic Games
Bronze medal – third place	2012 London	Team
World Championships
Gold medal – first place	2018 Wuxi	Team

Kelley Hurley (born April 4, 1988) is an American épée fencer. She won the bronze medal in the women's team épée event at the 2012 Summer Olympics. A standout at the University of Notre Dame, she was a 4-time All-American.

Coached by their father, Bob Hurley, Kelley and her younger sister Courtney have competed on World Teams together since Kelley was 17. Kelley qualified for her first Olympic Team in 2008 as the only women's épée fencer from the United States to do so. In 2012, Hurley qualified for her second team as a replacement athlete. Hurley won bronze in the team event as a member of the first U.S. Women's Épée Team ever to earn an Olympic medal. Hurley went into the Rio 2016 Olympics ranked 18th in the world in the individual épée, and finished 24th in Rio.

She competed for the United States in fencing at the 2020 Olympics in Tokyo in 2021, finishing 12th in the Women's Épée Individual. Along with her sister, she was also a member of the USA's 5th place entry in the Women's Épée Team event.

== See also ==
- List of USFA Division I National Champions
- List of NCAA fencing champions
