= 2011 World Taekwondo Olympic Qualification Tournament – Men's 80 kg =

Taekwondo competition

World Qualification Tournament
Men	Women
58 kg	49 kg
68 kg	57 kg
80 kg	67 kg
+80 kg	+67 kg

The Men's 80 kg is a competition featured at the 2011 World Taekwondo Olympic Qualification Tournament, and was held at the Sarhadchi Olympic Center in Baku, Azerbaijan on July 2. The first three ranked athletes qualify their NOCs a place each at the 2012 Olympic Games.

== Results ==
Legend

- DQ — Won by disqualification
- KO — Won by knockout
- WD — Won by withdrawal

=== Finals ===
Semifinals
Yousef Karami (IRI)	7
Nicolás García (ESP)	3
Ramin Azizov (AZE)	8
Mauro Sarmiento (ITA)	3

Final
Yousef Karami (IRI)
Ramin Azizov (AZE)	WD
3rd place
Nicolás García (ESP)	5
Mauro Sarmiento (ITA)	6

=== Top half ===
==== Section 1 ====
Round of 64
Hama Alzouma (NIG)	0
Vaughn Scott (NZL)	12
Piotr Paziński (POL)	0
Alberto Celestrin (GER)	1
Paula Sitapa (TGA)
Yousef Karami (IRI)	WD

Round of 32
Sébastien Michaud (CAN)	3
Vaughn Scott (NZL)	2
Marlon Avenido (PHI)	4
Ivan Trajkovič (SLO)	16
Nesar Ahmad Bahave (AFG)	4
Alberto Celestrin (GER)	9
Yousef Karami (IRI)	5
Steven López (USA)	4

Round of 16
Sébastien Michaud (CAN)	14
Ivan Trajkovič (SLO)	11
Alberto Celestrin (GER)	8
Yousef Karami (IRI)	10

Quarterfinals
Sébastien Michaud (CAN)	0
Yousef Karami (IRI)	3

==== Section 2 ====
Round of 64
~~Rasul Abduraim (KGZ)~~
Jasur Baykuziyev (UZB)	DQ
Yousef Al-Zubeydi (SWE)	7
Carlos Liebig (CHI)	6
Carlos Vásquez (VEN)	1
Bobby Enright (IRL)	0
Oumar Cissé (MLI)	4
Eirik Nilssen Bratli (NOR)	7

Round of 32
Nicolás García (ESP)	KO
Jasur Baykuziyev (UZB)
Yousef Al-Zubeydi (SWE)	8
Mamedy Doucara (FRA)	13
Miguel Ferrera (HON)	8
Carlos Vásquez (VEN)	0
Eirik Nilssen Bratli (NOR)	4
Nabil Talal (JOR)	5

Round of 16
Nicolás García (ESP)	3
Mamedy Doucara (FRA)	2
Miguel Ferrera (HON)	5
Nabil Talal (JOR)	11

Quarterfinals
Nicolás García (ESP)	1
Nabil Talal (JOR)	0

=== Bottom half ===
==== Section 3 ====
Round of 64
Emmanuel Mba Ndong (GAB)	3
Temidayo Jegede (NGR)	6
Alisher Gulov (TJK)	DQ
~~Noureddin Ebu El-Arough (LBA)~~
Anand Pandiarajan (IND)	1
Yair Medina (COL)	0
Flamur Zuberi (SUI)	0
Li Lai (CHN)	1

Round of 32
Issam Chernoubi (MAR)	13
Temidayo Jegede (NGR)	10
Alisher Gulov (TJK)	DQ
~~Lenn Hypolite (TRI)~~
Burak Hasan (AUS)	6
Anand Pandiarajan (IND)	2
Li Lai (CHN)	0
Ramin Azizov (AZE)	3

Round of 16
Issam Chernoubi (MAR)	8
Alisher Gulov (TJK)	3
Burak Hasan (AUS)	8
Ramin Azizov (AZE)	10

Quarterfinals
Issam Chernoubi (MAR)	8
Ramin Azizov (AZE)	9

==== Section 4 ====
Round of 64
Maksym Dominishyn (UKR)	DQ
~~Francis Kiambi (KEN)~~
Sebastián Crismanich (ARG)	9
Vitali Kolas (BLR)	4
Atief Arshad (PAK)	2
Tommy Mollet (NED)	3

Round of 32
Abdelrahman Ossama (EGY)	10
Maksym Dominishyn (UKR)	5
Sebastián Crismanich (ARG)	6
Yunus Sarı (TUR)	8
~~Aleksandar Veljanovski (MKD)~~
Rostand Kiki (BEN)	DQ
Tommy Mollet (NED)	5
Mauro Sarmiento (ITA)	8

Round of 16
Abdelrahman Ossama (EGY)	5
Yunus Sarı (TUR)	4
Rostand Kiki (BEN)	1
Mauro Sarmiento (ITA)	6

Quarterfinals
Abdelrahman Ossama (EGY)	0
Mauro Sarmiento (ITA)	3
