= 2011 World Taekwondo Championships – Men's welterweight =

Taekwondo competition

Men's welterweight at the 2011 World Championships
- Venue: Gyeongju Indoor Stadium
- Dates: 2–3 May 2011
- Competitors: 75 from 75 nations

Medalists
gold medal	Farzad Abdollahi	Iran
silver medal	Yunus Sarı	Turkey
bronze medal	Issam Chernoubi	Morocco
bronze medal	Ramin Azizov	Azerbaijan

The men's welterweight is a competition featured at the 2011 World Taekwondo Championships, and was held at the Gyeongju Gymnasium in Gyeongju, South Korea on May 2 and May 3. Welterweights were limited to a maximum of 80 kilograms in body mass.

== Results ==
Legend

- DQ — Won by disqualification
- N — Not match
- P — Won by punitive declaration

=== Finals ===
Quarterfinals		Semifinals		Final
Yunus Sarı (TUR)	5
Anestis Nikolaidis (GRE)	3	Yunus Sarı (TUR)	8
Issam Chernoubi (MAR)	17	Issam Chernoubi (MAR)	6
Mamedy Doucara (FRA)	10			Yunus Sarı (TUR)	1
Mauro Sarmiento (ITA)	6			Farzad Abdollahi (IRI)	5
Farzad Abdollahi (IRI)	7	Farzad Abdollahi (IRI)	1^{N}
Ramin Azizov (AZE)	7	Ramin Azizov (AZE)	0
Nesar Ahmad Bahave (AFG)	7

=== Top half ===
==== Section 1 ====
Round of 128
Luke Ford (USA)	DQ
~~Sergio Leguizamón (PAR)~~

Round of 64
Aaron Cook (GBR)	5
Luke Ford (USA)	7
Rudford Hamon (HAI)	DQ
~~Fronzie Charles (GRN)~~
Yunus Sarı (TUR)	4
Sebastian Lehmann (GER)	3
Lenn Hypolite (TRI)	4
Stuart Cilbert (ARU)	6

Round of 32
Luke Ford (USA)	2
Rudford Hamon (HAI)	4
Yunus Sarı (TUR)	10
Stuart Cilbert (ARU)	2

Round of 16
Rudford Hamon (HAI)	4
Yunus Sarı (TUR)	10

==== Section 2 ====
Round of 128
Sultan Kassymov (KAZ)	3
João Pedro Chaves (BRA)	4
Chen Zhiquan (MAC)	8
Ösökhbayaryn Amartüvshin (MGL)	1

Round of 64
Oumar Cissé (MLI)	6
João Pedro Chaves (BRA)	3
José Manuel Silverio (DOM)	6
Anestis Nikolaidis (GRE)	7
Lam Fuk Lung (HKG)	0
Atief Arshad (PAK)	12
Chen Zhiquan (MAC)	DQ
~~Carlos Vásquez (VEN)~~

Round of 32
Oumar Cissé (MLI)	2
Anestis Nikolaidis (GRE)	4
Atief Arshad (PAK)	16
Chen Zhiquan (MAC)	2

Round of 16
Anestis Nikolaidis (GRE)	6
Atief Arshad (PAK)	5

==== Section 3 ====
Round of 128
Jayson Grant (JAM)	3
Aydemir Shakhbanov (RUS)	12

Round of 64
Issam Chernoubi (MAR)	4
Aydemir Shakhbanov (RUS)	3
Tommy Mollet (NED)	DQ
~~Yosef Mohamed (LBA)~~
Hayden Shrive (AUS)	DQ
~~Hama Alzouma (NIG)~~
Eirik Nilssen Bratli (NOR)	5
Alisher Gulov (TJK)	6

Round of 32
Issam Chernoubi (MAR)	11
Tommy Mollet (NED)	9
Hayden Shrive (AUS)	0
Alisher Gulov (TJK)	6

Round of 16
Issam Chernoubi (MAR)	3
Alisher Gulov (TJK)	2

==== Section 4 ====
Round of 128
~~Michel Fernandes (POR)~~
Chang Kai (TPE)	DQ

Round of 64
Mamedy Doucara (FRA)	14
Bobby Enright (IRL)	2
Ivan Trajkovič (SLO)	4
Jasur Baykuziyev (UZB)	7
~~Teitoi Tabuariki (KIR)~~
Ángel Román (PUR)	DQ
Chang Kai (TPE)	1
Nicolás García (ESP)	10

Round of 32
Mamedy Doucara (FRA)	12
Jasur Baykuziyev (UZB)	6
Ángel Román (PUR)	0
Nicolás García (ESP)	10

Round of 16
Mamedy Doucara (FRA)	7
Nicolás García (ESP)	6

=== Bottom half ===
==== Section 5 ====
Round of 128
Ali Kadhim (IRQ)	2
Lương Minh Đạt (VIE)	1

Round of 64
Mauro Sarmiento (ITA)	9
Ali Kadhim (IRQ)	1
Stojan Rabijac (SRB)	5^{N}
Cristhian Barceló (CHI)	2
In Kyo-don (KOR)	6
Sebastien Konan (CIV)	3
Basuki Nugroho (INA)	1
Li Lai (CHN)	13

Round of 32
Mauro Sarmiento (ITA)	4
Stojan Rabijac (SRB)	0
In Kyo-don (KOR)	4
Li Lai (CHN)	3

Round of 16
Mauro Sarmiento (ITA)	1
In Kyo-don (KOR)	0

==== Section 6 ====
Round of 128
David Adjetey (GHA)	5^{P}
Orlando Nhantumbo (MOZ)	1
Adrián Sagastume (GUA)	1
Rasul Abduraim (KGZ)	3

Round of 64
Farzad Abdollahi (IRI)	11
David Adjetey (GHA)	2
Maksym Dominishyn (UKR)	11
Amir Katana (BIH)	5
Yoojin Lee (JPN)	1
Sebastián Crismanich (ARG)	10
Rasul Abduraim (KGZ)	0
José Luis Ramírez (MEX)	6

Round of 32
Farzad Abdollahi (IRI)	14
Maksym Dominishyn (UKR)	2
Sebastián Crismanich (ARG)	7
José Luis Ramírez (MEX)	2

Round of 16
Farzad Abdollahi (IRI)	5
Sebastián Crismanich (ARG)	4

==== Section 7 ====
Round of 128
Yassine Trabelsi (TUN)	DQ
~~Yair Medina (COL)~~
Giorgi Ansiani (GEO)	5
Moise Timanty (BEN)	2

Round of 64
Abdelrahman Ossama (EGY)	7
Yassine Trabelsi (TUN)	6
Vitali Kolas (BLR)	DQ
~~Miguel Ferrera (HON)~~
~~Lumu Tshimanga (COD)~~
Piotr Paziński (POL)	DQ
Giorgi Ansiani (GEO)	2
Ramin Azizov (AZE)	11

Round of 32
Abdelrahman Ossama (EGY)	3
Vitali Kolas (BLR)	2
Piotr Paziński (POL)	3
Ramin Azizov (AZE)	6

Round of 16
Abdelrahman Ossama (EGY)	7
Ramin Azizov (AZE)	8

==== Section 8 ====
Round of 128
Honorat Randrianantoandro (MAD)	DQ
~~Paea Ponsi (TGA)~~

Round of 64
Marlon Avenido (PHI)	DQ
~~Raun Morton (SKN)~~
~~Vincent Dock (KEN)~~
Nesar Ahmad Bahave (AFG)	DQ
Alassane Sylla (CGO)	6
Anand Pandiarajan (IND)	20
Honorat Randrianantoandro (MAD)	2
Sébastien Michaud (CAN)	8

Round of 32
Marlon Avenido (PHI)	6
Nesar Ahmad Bahave (AFG)	14
Anand Pandiarajan (IND)	0
Sébastien Michaud (CAN)	10

Round of 16
Nesar Ahmad Bahave (AFG)	6
Sébastien Michaud (CAN)	5
