= Taekwondo at the 2012 Summer Olympics =

Coordinates: 51.5075°N 0.0297°E

Taekwondo at the Games of the XXX Olympiad
- Venue: ExCeL London
- Dates: 8–11 August 2012
- Competitors: 128 from 63 nations

Taekwondo competitions at the 2012 Summer Olympics in London was held from 8 August to 11 August at the ExCeL London. Competition was held in eight weight categories; four for men, and four for women.

== Qualification ==
The Taekwondo competition at the 2012 Games included 128 athletes, 64 in each gender, 16 in each of the eight weight divisions. Each competing nations were allowed to enter a maximum of four competitors, two of each gender. Each nation would therefore be eligible to compete in a maximum of half the weight categories.

Four places were reserved for Great Britain as host nation, and a further four was invitational as decided by the Tripartite Commission. The remaining 120 places were allocated through a qualification process, in which athletes won quota places for their respective nation.

If a nation which qualified through a Qualification Tournament relinquishes a quota place, it would be allocated to the nation of the next highest placed athlete in the respective weight category of that tournament as long as the addition of the place does not exceed the maximum quota for that nation.

== Schedule ==
Daily schedule
Date →	Wed 8	Thu 9	Fri 10	Sat 11
Men's	58 kg	68 kg	80 kg	+80 kg
Women's	49 kg	57 kg	67 kg	+67 kg

== Medal summary ==
Due to the increasing controversies happened in the previous Olympics Taekwondo which led to speculations that this competition might be removed from the Olympic program, the World Taekwondo Federation introduced new electronic scoring system and instant video replays in anticipation to make the competition more transparent and fair. The distinction of Taekwondo at these Olympic Games was that this was the first time in the sport that eight gold medals were awarded to eight different NOCs. Europe took the lead and South Korea lost its dominance. The 2012 Olympics was the second time that South Korea, failed to have the best medal record in Taekwondo. Steven López, Alexandros Nikolaidis and Sarah Stevenson, the only three legends who participated in each of the three previous Olympics, were all eliminated in the preliminary round. Lee In Jong and Cha Dong-Min became the first two Korean Taekwondo practitioners who could not secure any medals in the Olympics Taekwondo history. Rohullah Nikpai of Afghanistan defended his previous bronze medalist standing. Anthony Obame originated Gabon's Olympic medalist history in the sport.

=== Medal table ===
Rank	Nation	Gold	Silver	Bronze	Total
1	Spain	1	2	0	3
2	China	1	1	1	3
3	South Korea	1	1	0	2
3	Turkey	1	1	0	2
5	Great Britain	1	0	1	2
5	Italy	1	0	1	2
7	Argentina	1	0	0	1
7	Serbia	1	0	0	1
9	France	0	1	1	2
10	Gabon	0	1	0	1
10	Iran	0	1	0	1
12	Russia	0	0	2	2
12	United States	0	0	2	2
14	Afghanistan	0	0	1	1
14	Chinese Taipei	0	0	1	1
14	Colombia	0	0	1	1
14	Croatia	0	0	1	1
14	Cuba	0	0	1	1
14	Germany	0	0	1	1
14	Mexico	0	0	1	1
14	Thailand	0	0	1	1
Totals (21 entries)		8	8	16	32

=== Men's events ===
Event	Gold	Silver	Bronze
Flyweight (58 kg)	Joel González; Spain	Lee Dae-hoon; South Korea	Aleksey Denisenko; Russia
Flyweight (58 kg)	Joel González; Spain	Lee Dae-hoon; South Korea	Óscar Muñoz; Colombia
Lightweight (68 kg)	Servet Tazegül; Turkey	Mohammad Bagheri; Iran	Terrence Jennings; United States
Lightweight (68 kg)	Servet Tazegül; Turkey	Mohammad Bagheri; Iran	Rohullah Nikpai; Afghanistan
Middleweight (80 kg)	Sebastián Crismanich; Argentina	Nicolás García; Spain	Lutalo Muhammad; Great Britain
Middleweight (80 kg)	Sebastián Crismanich; Argentina	Nicolás García; Spain	Mauro Sarmiento; Italy
Heavyweight (+80 kg)	Carlo Molfetta; Italy	Anthony Obame; Gabon	Robelis Despaigne; Cuba
Heavyweight (+80 kg)	Carlo Molfetta; Italy	Anthony Obame; Gabon	Liu Xiaobo; China

=== Women's events ===
Event	Gold	Silver	Bronze
Flyweight (49 kg)	Wu Jingyu; China	Brigitte Yagüe; Spain	Chanatip Sonkham; Thailand
Flyweight (49 kg)	Wu Jingyu; China	Brigitte Yagüe; Spain	Lucija Zaninović; Croatia
Lightweight (57 kg)	Jade Jones; Great Britain	Hou Yuzhuo; China	Marlène Harnois; France
Lightweight (57 kg)	Jade Jones; Great Britain	Hou Yuzhuo; China	Tseng Li-cheng; Chinese Taipei
Middleweight (67 kg)	Hwang Kyung-seon; South Korea	Nur Tatar; Turkey	Paige McPherson; United States
Middleweight (67 kg)	Hwang Kyung-seon; South Korea	Nur Tatar; Turkey	Helena Fromm; Germany
Heavyweight (+67 kg)	Milica Mandić; Serbia	Anne-Caroline Graffe; France	Anastasia Baryshnikova; Russia
Heavyweight (+67 kg)	Milica Mandić; Serbia	Anne-Caroline Graffe; France	María Espinoza; Mexico

== Flag bearers ==
Eleven taekwondo athletes were flag bearers during the Parade of Nations:

- Alexandros Nikolaidis, representing Greece. Alexandros won a silver medal at the 2008 Beijing Olympics. He previously had the honor to be the relay originating torchbearer of the 2008 Summer Olympics. He was a silver medalist at the 2004 Summer Olympics in Athens. He compete in the Men's +80kg (heavyweight).
- Nesar Ahmad Bahave, representing Afghanistan. He was also the flag bearer for Afghanistan at the 2008 Beijing Olympics. He has yet to medal at the Olympics, but he did win the silver at the World Championships in 2007. He competed in the Men's 80 kg (middleweight). On August,? he advanced from the preliminaries to the quarterfinals where he was defeated by Sebastián Crismanich of Argentina. Sebastián advanced to the gold medal match, so N advanced to the repechage bracket where he advanced again from the preliminary round to the bronze medal match against Mauro Sarmiento of Italy.
- Arman Yeremyan, representing Armenia. He competed in the Men's 80 kg (middleweight). On August 10, he advanced from the preliminaries to the quarterfinals where he was defeated by Sebastián Crismanich of Argentina. Sebastián went on to win the gold medal.
- Sorn Davin, representing Cambodia. She competed in the Women's +67 kg (heavyweight).
- Seulki Kang, representing the Central African Republic. She competed in the Women's 49 kg (flyweight). On August 8, she was defeated in the preliminary round against Lucija Zaninović of Croatia.
- Gabriel Mercedes, representing the Dominican Republic. He was a silver medalist at the 2008 Summer Olympics in Beijing. He was a favorite to win his country's third medal. He competed in the Men's 58 kg (flyweight). Mercedes lasted one round and a half. A bad move shattered the meniscus and the anterior cruciate ligament in his right knee. He kept fighting with evident pain, before he limped away in tears.
- Nadin Dawani, representing Jordan. She competed in the Women's +67 kg (heavyweight).
- Andrea Paoli, representing Lebanon. She competed in the Women's 57 kg (lightweight). On August 8, she advanced from the preliminary round to the quarterfinals by defeating Nidia Munoz of Cuba. In the quarterfinals, she lost against Tseng Li-Cheng of Taipei and did not advance to the bronze medal match.
- María Espinoza, representing Mexico. María was a gold medalist at the 2008 Summer Olympics in Beijing. She competed in the Women's +67 kg (heavyweight).
- Wiam Dislam, representing Morocco. She competed in the Women's +67 kg (heavyweight).
- Tameem Al-Kubati, representing Yemen. He competed in the Men's 58 kg (flyweight). On August 8, he advanced from the preliminaries to the quarterfinals by defeating Gabriel Mercedes of the Dominican Republic (8-3). In the quarterfinals, he was defeated by Óscar Muñoz of Colombia (2-14).

In addition, Sarah Stevenson, representing the host nation, Great Britain, took the athlete's oath at the opening ceremony.

== Participating nations ==
A total of 128 athletes from 63 nations competed in taekwondo at the London Games. Only six nations brought four athletes: Egypt, Great Britain, Korea, Mexico, Russia, and the United States.

- Afghanistan (2)
- Algeria (1)
- Argentina (2)
- Armenia (1)
- Australia (2)
- Azerbaijan (2)
- Brazil (2)
- Central African Republic (2)
- Cambodia (1)
- Canada (3)
- Chile (1)
- China (3)
- Ivory Coast (1)
- Colombia (1)
- Costa Rica (1)
- Croatia (2)
- Cuba (3)
- Dominican Republic (1)
- Egypt (4)
- Spain (3)
- Finland (1)
- France (2)
- Gabon (1)
- Great Britain (4)
- Germany (2)
- Greece (1)
- Grenada (1)
- Guatemala (1)
- Iran (3)
- Italy (2)
- Jamaica (1)
- Jordan (3)
- Japan (2)
- Kazakhstan (3)
- Kyrgyzstan (1)
- South Korea (4)
- Lebanon (1)
- Morocco (3)
- Mexico (4)
- Mali (1)
- Netherlands (1)
- Nigeria (2)
- New Zealand (3)
- Panama (1)
- Peru (1)
- Papua New Guinea (1)
- Poland (1)
- Russia (4)
- Samoa (2)
- Senegal (1)
- Slovenia (3)
- Serbia (3)
- Sweden (2)
- Thailand (3)
- Tajikistan (2)
- Chinese Taipei (3)
- Tunisia (1)
- Turkey (3)
- Ukraine (2)
- United States (4)
- Uzbekistan (3)
- Vietnam (2)
- Yemen (1)

== Controversy ==
British taekwondo practitioner Aaron Cook was involved in controversy relating to selection for the games. Although ranked number one in the world, Great Britain decided to send Lutalo Muhammad, ranked 59th. Cook appealed the omission claiming that he was overlooked because he stepped outside of Britain's training program and found his own coach, but the World Taekwondo Federation found that no rules were broken during the selection process.
