= Italy at the 2012 Summer Olympics =

- IOC code: ITA
- NOC: Italian National Olympic Committee
- Website: www.coni.it (in Italian)

in London
- Competitors: 285 in 22 sports
- Flag bearers: Valentina Vezzali (gold) (bronze) (opening); Daniele Molmenti (gold) (closing)
- Medals Ranked 9th: Gold 8 Silver 9 Bronze 11 Total 28

Summer Olympics appearances (overview)
- 1896; 1900; 1904; 1908; 1912; 1920; 1924; 1928; 1932; 1936; 1948; 1952; 1956; 1960; 1964; 1968; 1972; 1976; 1980; 1984; 1988; 1992; 1996; 2000; 2004; 2008; 2012; 2016; 2020; 2024; 2028

Other related appearances
- 1906 Intercalated Games

Italy competed at the 2012 Summer Olympics in London, from 27 July to 12 August 2012. This nation has competed at every Summer Olympic Games in the modern era, except for the 1904 Summer Olympics in St. Louis. The Italian National Olympic Committee (Italian: Comitato Olimpico Nazionale Italiano, CONI) sent the nation's smallest delegation to the Games since the 1988 Summer Olympics in Seoul. A total of 285 athletes, 162 men and 123 women, competed in 22 sports.

Italy left London with a total of 28 Olympic medals (8 gold, 9 silver, and 11 bronze), finishing eighth in the overall medal standings. Seven of these medals were awarded to the athletes in fencing, five in shooting, and three in boxing. Six Italian athletes won more than a single Olympic medal in London. After suffering a major setback from Beijing, Italy's team-based athletes recaptured their success at these games as the men's water polo team and the men's indoor volleyball team won silver and bronze medals respectively. For the first time since 1984, Italy did not win an Olympic medal in swimming, except for the open water marathon.

Among the nation's medalists were shooters Niccolò Campriani and Jessica Rossi, who broke an Olympic and a world record to win gold medals in their respective events. Two Italian athletes won gold medals for the first time in Olympic history: archer Michele Frangilli, who competed at his fifth Olympics, in team archery, and taekwondo jin Carlo Molfetta in men's super heavyweight division. Foil fencer Valentina Vezzali, who won gold and bronze in London, became one of the most successful Italian athletes in history, with a total of eight Olympic medals. Meanwhile, boxer Clemente Russo managed to repeat his silver medal from Beijing.

== Medalists ==
Medal	Name	Sport	Event	Date
Gold	Michele Frangilli; Marco Galiazzo; Mauro Nespoli	Archery	Men's team	28 July
Gold	Elisa Di Francisca	Fencing	Women's foil	28 July
Gold	Daniele Molmenti	Canoeing	Men's slalom K-1	1 August
Gold	Elisa Di Francisca; Arianna Errigo; Valentina Vezzali; Ilaria Salvatori	Fencing	Team foil	2 August
Gold	Jessica Rossi	Shooting	Trap	4 August
Gold	Valerio Aspromonte; Giorgio Avola; Andrea Baldini; Andrea Cassarà	Fencing	Team foil	5 August
Gold	Niccolò Campriani	Shooting	Men's 50 m rifle three positions	6 August
Gold	Carlo Molfetta	Taekwondo	Men's +80 kg	11 August
Silver	Luca Tesconi	Shooting	Men's 10 m air pistol	28 July
Silver	Arianna Errigo	Fencing	Women's foil	28 July
Silver	Diego Occhiuzzi	Fencing	Men's sabre	29 July
Silver	Niccolò Campriani	Shooting	Men's 10 m air rifle	30 July
Silver	Alessio Sartori; Romano Battisti	Rowing	Men's double sculls	2 August
Silver	Massimo Fabbrizi	Shooting	Men's trap	6 August
Silver	Clemente Russo	Boxing	Men's heavyweight	11 August
Silver	Roberto Cammarelle	Boxing	Men's super heavyweight	12 August
Silver	Italy men's national water polo team: Stefano Tempesti; Amaurys Pérez; Niccolò Gitto; Pietro Figlioli; Alex Giorgetti; Maurizio Felugo; Giacomo Pastorino; Massimo Giacoppo; Valentino Gallo; Christian Presciutti; Deni Fiorentini; Matteo Aicardi; Danijel Premuš	Water polo	Men's tournament	12 August
Bronze	Valentina Vezzali	Fencing	Women's foil	28 July
Bronze	Rosalba Forciniti	Judo	Women's 52 kg	29 July
Bronze	Aldo Montano; Diego Occhiuzzi; Luigi Tarantino; Luigi Samele	Fencing	Men's team sabre	3 August
Bronze	Matteo Morandi	Gymnastics	Men's rings	6 August
Bronze	Martina Grimaldi	Swimming	Women's 10 km open water	9 August
Bronze	Fabrizio Donato	Athletics	Men's triple jump	9 August
Bronze	Vincenzo Mangiacapre	Boxing	Men's light welterweight	10 August
Bronze	Mauro Sarmiento	Taekwondo	Men's 80 kg	10 August
Bronze	Italy men's national volleyball team: Luigi Mastrangelo; Simone Parodi; Samuele Papi; Michal Lasko; Ivan Zaytsev; Dante Boninfante; Cristian Savani; Dragan Travica; Alessandro Fei; Emanuele Birarelli; Andrea Bari; Andrea Giovi	Volleyball	Men's tournament	12 August
Bronze	Marco Aurelio Fontana	Cycling	Men's cross-country	12 August
Bronze	Elisa Blanchi; Romina Laurito; Marta Pagnini; Elisa Santoni; Anzhelika Savrayuk; Andreea Stefanescu	Rhythmic gymnastics	Team	12 August

Medals by sport
Sport	1st place, gold medalist(s)	2nd place, silver medalist(s)	3rd place, bronze medalist(s)	Total
Fencing	3	2	2	7
Shooting	2	3	0	5
Taekwondo	1	0	1	2
Archery	1	0	0	1
Canoeing	1	0	0	1
Boxing	0	2	1	3
Rowing	0	1	0	1
Water polo	0	1	0	1
Gymnastics	0	0	2	2
Athletics	0	0	1	1
Swimming	0	0	1	1
Cycling	0	0	1	1
Volleyball	0	0	1	1
Judo	0	0	1	1
Total	8	9	11	28

== Delegation ==
Comitato Olimpico Nazionale Italiano (CONI) selected a team of 285 athletes, 162 men and 123 women, to compete in 22 sports; it was the nation's smallest team sent to the Olympics since 1988. Italy did not qualify teams in basketball, field hockey, football, and handball. There was only a single competitor in badminton, track cycling, BMX cycling, equestrian dressage, trampoline gymnastics, weightlifting, and Greco-Roman wrestling.

The Italian team featured past Olympic champions, four of them defending (super heavyweight boxer Roberto Cammarelle, foil fencer Valentina Vezzali, judoka Giulia Quintavalle, and freestyle swimmer Federica Pellegrini). Vezzali, who competed at her fifth Olympics as the most experienced athlete, became Italy's first female flag bearer at the opening ceremony since 1996.

Two naturalized Italian athletes made their multiple Olympic appearances as individuals. Sprint kayaker Josefa Idem, the oldest of the team at age 47, became the first female athlete to compete in eight Olympic Games, although she played for the former West Germany in her first two appearances. Archer Natalia Valeeva, on the other hand, competed at her sixth Olympics as an individual athlete, having played under three different banners (the other two were the Unified Team and her native land Moldova). Along with Valeeva, two other Italian athletes made their sixth Olympic appearance: trap shooter Giovanni Pellielo and windsurfer and four-time Olympic medalist Alessandra Sensini. Along with Vezzali, three other athletes made their fifth Olympic appearance: archer Michele Frangilli, sabre fencer and two-time world champion Luigi Tarantino, and skeet shooter and former Olympic gold medalist Ennio Falco. Meanwhile, gymnast Erika Fasana, at age 16, was the youngest athlete of the team.

Other notable Italian athletes featured taekwondo jin and Olympic silver medalist Mauro Sarmiento, sabre fencer and former Olympic gold medalist Aldo Montano, and rifle shooter and multiple-time World Cup champion Niccolò Campriani.

The following is the list of number of competitors participating in the Games:

Sport	Men	Women	Total
Archery	3	3	6
Athletics	19	19	38
Badminton	0	1	1
Boxing	7	0	7
Canoeing	5	3	8
Cycling	8	5	13
Diving	4	4	8
Equestrian	2	1	3
Fencing	9	9	18
Gymnastics	6	12	18
Judo	4	5	9
Modern pentathlon	2	2	4
Rowing	18	2	20
Sailing	7	4	11
Shooting	11	4	15
Swimming	20	14	34
Synchronized swimming	0	2	2
Table tennis	1	1	2
Taekwondo	2	0	2
Tennis	3	4	7
Triathlon	2	1	3
Volleyball	14	14	28
Water polo	13	13	26
Weightlifting	1	0	1
Wrestling	1	0	1
Total	162	123	285

== Archery ==
Qualified six athletes.

Men

Athlete	Event	Ranking round		Round of 64	Round of 32	Round of 16	Quarterfinals	Semifinals	Final / BM	
Athlete	Event	Score	Seed	Opposition Score	Opposition Score	Opposition Score	Opposition Score	Opposition Score	Opposition Score	Rank
Michele Frangilli	Individual	662	37	Hrachov (UKR) (28); L 3–7	Did not advance					
Marco Galiazzo	Individual	662	36	Serrano (MEX) (29); L 2–6	Did not advance					
Mauro Nespoli	Individual	674	11	Chen Y-c (TPE) (54); L 2–6	Did not advance					
Michele Frangilli; Marco Galiazzo; Mauro Nespoli	Team	1998	6	—N/a		Chinese Taipei (11); W 216–206	China (3); W 220–216	Mexico (7); W 217–215	United States (4); W 219–218	1st place, gold medalist(s)

Women

Athlete	Event	Ranking round		Round of 64	Round of 32	Round of 16	Quarterfinals	Semifinals	Final / BM	
Athlete	Event	Score	Seed	Opposition Score	Opposition Score	Opposition Score	Opposition Score	Opposition Score	Opposition Score	Rank
Pia Lionetti	Individual	652	19	Hultzer (RSA) (46); W 6–2	Leek (USA) (14); W 6–4	Tan Y-t (TPE) (3); W 6–2	Román (MEX) (11); L 2–6	Did not advance		
Jessica Tomasi	Individual	635	44	Choi H-J (KOR) (21); L 5–6	Did not advance					
Natalia Valeeva	Individual	650	24	Kwon U-S (PRK) (41); W 7–3	Perova (RUS) (9); L 2–6	Did not advance				
Pia Lionetti; Jessica Tomasi; Natalia Valeeva	Team	1937	10	—N/a		China (7); L 199–200	Did not advance			

== Athletics ==
Italian athletes have so far achieved qualifying standards in the following athletics events (up to a maximum of 3 athletes in each event at the 'A' Standard, and 1 at the 'B' Standard):

On June 30, 39 Italian athletes were qualified with the A Standard, or as first 12 team relay, reduced to 38 because of an injury waiver for the champion of high jump (5 medals in international competitions 1st level), Antonietta Di Martino. On August 8, Alex Schwazer, the defending Olympic champion in the men's 50 km race walk, was disqualified after he failed the doping test for using the blood-boosting agent recombinant erythropoietin (rhEPO).

Key

- Note – Ranks given for track events are within the athlete's heat only
- Q = Qualified for the next round
- q = Qualified for the next round as a fastest loser or, in field events, by position without achieving the qualifying target
- NR = National record
- N/A = Round not applicable for the event
- Bye = Athlete not required to compete in round

Men
Track & road events

Athlete	Event	Heat		Semifinal		Final	
Athlete	Event	Result	Rank	Result	Rank	Result	Rank
Daniele Meucci	5000 m	13:28.71	8	—N/a		Did not advance	
Daniele Meucci	10000 m	—N/a				28:57.46	24
Emanuele Abate	110 m hurdles	13.46	4 q	13.35	4	Did not advance	
José Bencosme	400 m hurdles	49.35	3 Q	50.07	6	Did not advance	
Yuri Floriani	3000 m steeplechase	8:29.01	2 Q	—N/a		8:40.07	13
Fabio Cerutti; Simone Collio; Rosario La Mastra; Davide Manenti; Diego Marani; Jacques Riparelli	4 × 100 m relay	38.58	7	—N/a		Did not advance	
Ruggero Pertile	Marathon	—N/a				2:12:45	10
Giorgio Rubino	20 km walk	—N/a				1:25:28	42
Marco De Luca	50 km walk	—N/a				3:47:19	17

Field events

Athlete	Event	Qualification		Final	
Athlete	Event	Distance	Position	Distance	Position
Gianmarco Tamberi	High jump	2.21	21	Did not advance	
Fabrizio Donato	Triple jump	16.86	8 q	17.48	3rd place, bronze medalist(s)
Daniele Greco	Triple jump	17.00	4 q	17.34	4
Lorenzo Povegliano	Hammer throw	71.55	27	Did not advance	
Nicola Vizzoni	Hammer throw	74.79	10 q	76.07	8

Women
Track & road events

Athlete	Event	Heat		Semifinal		Final	
Athlete	Event	Result	Rank	Result	Rank	Result	Rank
Gloria Hooper	200 m	23.25	6	Did not advance			
Libania Grenot	400 m	52.13	3 Q	51.18	3	Did not advance	
Elena Romagnolo	5000 m	15:06.38	9 q	—N/a		15:35.69	15
Silvia Weissteiner	5000 m	15:06.81	7	—N/a		Did not advance	
Nadia Ejjafini	5000 m	15:24.70	14	—N/a		Did not advance	
Nadia Ejjafini	10000 m	—N/a				31:57.03	18
Marzia Caravelli	100 m hurdles	13.01	3 Q	DSQ		Did not advance	
Giulia Arcioni; Chiara Bazzoni; Elena Maria Bonfanti; Libania Grenot; Manuela Gentili; Maria Enrica Spacca	4 × 400 m relay	3:29.01	7	—N/a		Did not advance	
Rosaria Console	Marathon	—N/a				2:30:09	30
Anna Incerti	Marathon	—N/a				2:29:38	29
Valeria Straneo	Marathon	—N/a				2:25:27	8
Eleonora Giorgi	20 km walk	—N/a				1:29:48	14
Elisa Rigaudo	20 km walk	—N/a				1:27:36	7

Field events

Athlete	Event	Qualification		Final	
Athlete	Event	Distance	Position	Distance	Position
Simona La Mantia	Triple jump	13.92	18	Did not advance	
Chiara Rosa	Shot put	18.30	15	Did not advance	
Silvia Salis	Hammer throw	10.84	36	Did not advance	

== Badminton ==
Athlete	Event	Group Stage			Elimination	Quarterfinal	Semifinal	Final / BM	
Athlete	Event	Opposition Score	Opposition Score	Rank	Opposition Score	Opposition Score	Opposition Score	Opposition Score	Rank
Agnese Allegrini	Women's singles	Tee J Y (MAS); L 7–21, 14–21	Bae Y-j (KOR); L 11–21, 15–21	3	Did not advance				

== Boxing ==
Italy has so far qualified boxers for the following events

Men

Athlete	Event	Round of 32	Round of 16	Quarterfinals	Semifinals	Final	
Athlete	Event	Opposition Result	Opposition Result	Opposition Result	Opposition Result	Opposition Result	Rank
Manuel Cappai	Light flyweight	Barriga (PHI); L 7–17	Did not advance				
Vincenzo Picardi	Flyweight	Bye	Tögstsogt (MGL); L 16–17	Did not advance			
Vittorio Parrinello	Bantamweight	Matheus (NAM); W 18–7	Campbell (GBR); L 9–11	Did not advance			
Domenico Valentino	Lightweight	Bye	Taylor (GBR); W 15–10	Petrauskas (LTU); L 14–16	Did not advance		
Vincenzo Mangiacapre	Light welterweight	Bye	Káté (HUN); W 20–14	Yeleussinov (KAZ); W 16–12	Iglesias (CUB); L 8–15	Did not advance	3rd place, bronze medalist(s)
Clemente Russo	Heavyweight	—N/a	Silva (ANG); W WO	Larduet (CUB); W 12–10	Mammadov (AZE); W 15–13	Usyk (UKR); L 11–14	2nd place, silver medalist(s)
Roberto Cammarelle	Super heavyweight	—N/a	Perea (ECU); W 18–10	Arjaoui (MAR); W 12–11	Majidov (AZE); W 13–12	Joshua (GBR); L 18–18^{+}	2nd place, silver medalist(s)

== Canoeing ==
Eight Italian athletes have qualified for the following events.

=== Slalom ===
Athlete	Event	Preliminary						Semifinal		Final	
Athlete	Event	Run 1	Rank	Run 2	Rank	Best	Rank	Time	Rank	Time	Rank
Stefano Cipressi	Men's C-1	96.40	9	99.74	11	96.40	13	Did not advance			
Daniele Molmenti	Men's K-1	91.40	10	88.68	8	88.68	9 Q	96.37	3 Q	93.43	1st place, gold medalist(s)
Pietro Camporesi; Niccolò Ferrari	Men's C-2	120.64	14	111.55	10	111.55	13	Did not advance			
Maria Clara Giai Pron	Women's K-1	99.66	2	112.65	15	99.66	3 Q	176.61	15	Did not advance	

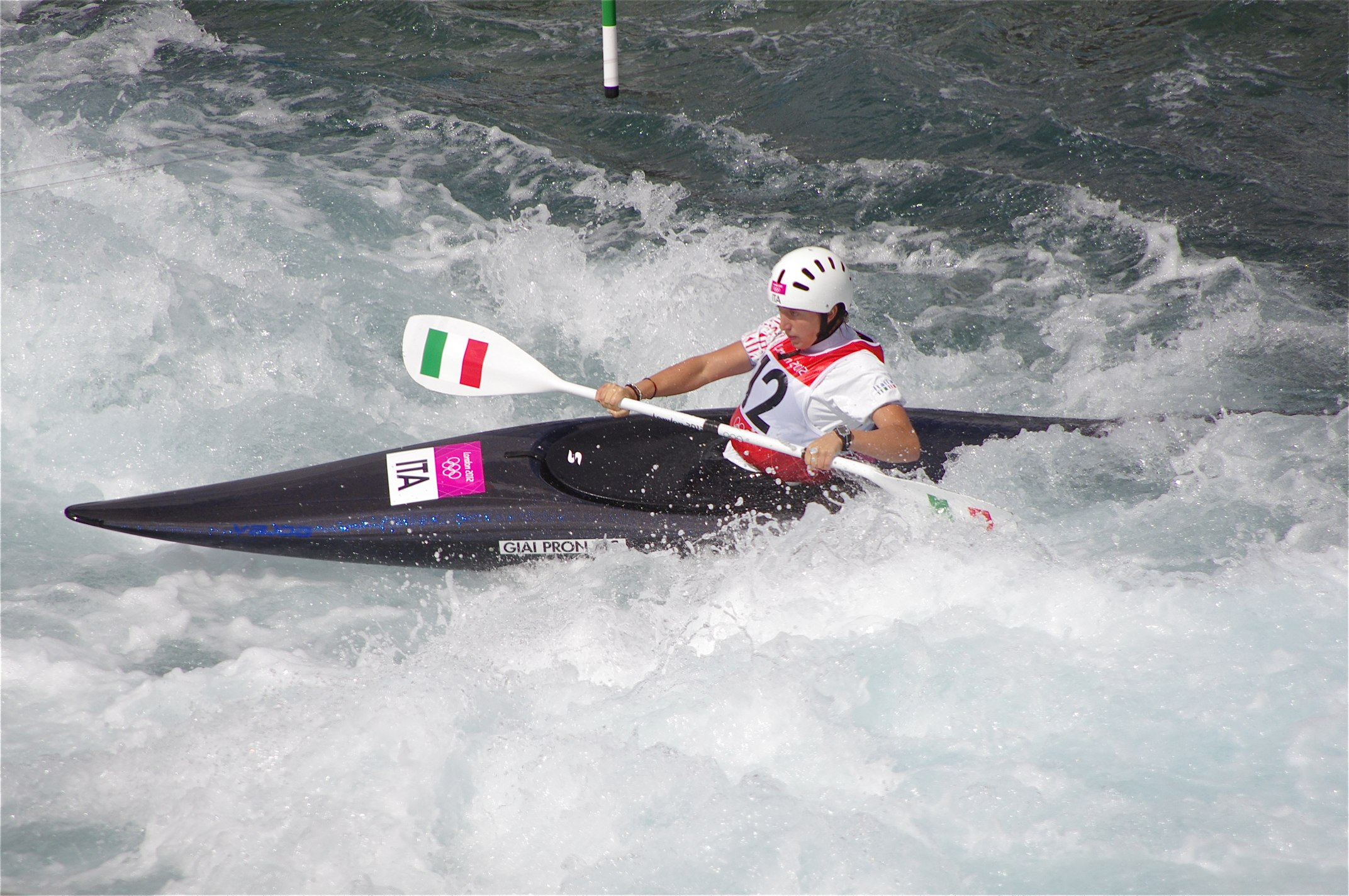
Maria Clara Giai Pron in K-1 semifinal

=== Sprint ===
Athlete	Event	Heats		Semifinals		Finals	
Athlete	Event	Time	Rank	Time	Rank	Time	Rank
Maximilian Benassi	Men's K-1 1000 m	3:35.543	7	Did not advance			
Josefa Idem	Women's K-1 500 m	1:55.619	3 Q	1:52.232	1 FA	1:53.223	5
Norma Murabito	Women's K-1 200 m	43.820	7	Did not advance			

Qualification Legend: FA = Qualify to final (medal); FB = Qualify to final B (non-medal)

== Cycling ==
=== Road ===
Men

Athlete	Event	Time	Rank
Sacha Modolo	Road race	5:46:51	99
Vincenzo Nibali	Road race	5:46:53	101
Luca Paolini	Road race	5:46:05	9
Marco Pinotti	Road race	5:54:04	107
Marco Pinotti	Time trial	52:49.28	5
Elia Viviani	Road race	5:46:37	38

Women

Athlete	Event	Time	Rank
Monia Baccaille	Road race	OTL	
Giorgia Bronzini	Road race	3:35:56	5
Noemi Cantele	Road race	3:36:04	34
Noemi Cantele	Time trial	41:51.18	22
Tatiana Guderzo	Road race	3:36:01	30
Tatiana Guderzo	Time trial	41:48.94	21

=== Track ===
Omnium

Athlete	Event	Flying lap		Points race		Elimination race	Individual pursuit		Scratch race	Time trial		Total points	Rank
Athlete	Event	Time	Rank	Points	Rank	Rank	Time	Rank	Rank	Time	Rank	Total points	Rank
Elia Viviani	Men's omnium	13.359	6	47	5	2	4:28.499	7	5	1:04.239	9	34	6

=== Mountain biking ===
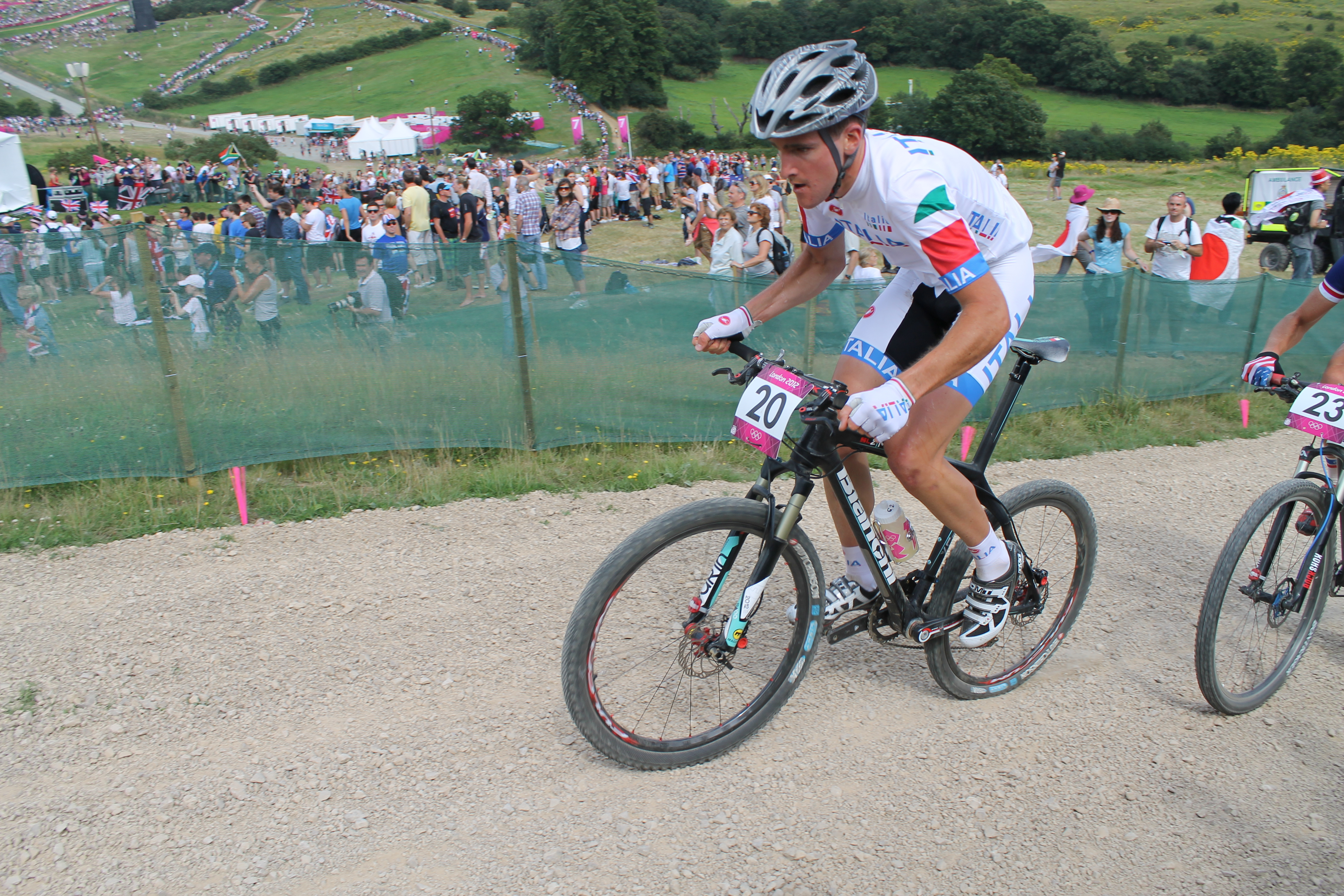
Gerhard Kerschbaumer in men's cross-country race

Athlete	Event	Time	Rank
Marco Aurelio Fontana	Men's cross-country	1:29:32	3rd place, bronze medalist(s)
Gerhard Kerschbaumer	Men's cross-country	1:32:02	13
Eva Lechner	Women's cross-country	1:37:36	17

=== BMX ===
Athlete	Event	Seeding		Quarterfinal		Semifinal		Final	
Athlete	Event	Result	Rank	Points	Rank	Points	Rank	Result	Rank
Manuel De Vecchi	Men's BMX	38.385	18	29	7	Did not advance			

== Diving ==
Eight divers qualified.

Men

Athlete	Event	Preliminaries		Semifinals		Final	
Athlete	Event	Points	Rank	Points	Rank	Points	Rank
Michele Benedetti	3 m springboard	433.05	20	Did not advance			
Tommaso Rinaldi	3 m springboard	400.00	24	Did not advance			
Andrea Chiarabini	10 m platform	367.75	28	Did not advance			
Francesco Dell'Uomo	10 m platform	370.25	27	Did not advance			

Women

Athlete	Event	Preliminaries		Semifinals		Final	
Athlete	Event	Points	Rank	Points	Rank	Points	Rank
Tania Cagnotto	3 m springboard	349.80	3 Q	362.10	2 Q	362.20	4
Francesca Dallapè	3 m springboard	311.25	13 Q	312.60	15	Did not advance	
Noemi Batki	10 m platform	324.20	12 Q	325.45	10 Q	350.05	8
Brenda Spaziani	10 m platform	268.00	23	Did not advance			
Tania Cagnotto; Francesca Dallapè	3 m synchronized springboard	—N/a				314.10	4

== Equestrian ==
=== Dressage ===
Athlete	Horse	Event	Grand Prix		Grand Prix Special		Grand Prix Freestyle		Overall	
Athlete	Horse	Event	Score	Rank	Score	Rank	Technical	Artistic	Score	Rank
Valentina Truppa	Eremo del Castegno	Individual	75.790	9 Q	73.127	18 Q	75.143	81.286	78.214	15

=== Eventing ===
Athlete	Horse	Event	Dressage		Cross-country			Jumping				Total	
Athlete	Horse	Event	Dressage		Cross-country			Qualifier			Final	Total	
Athlete	Horse	Event	Penalties	Rank	Penalties	Total	Rank	Penalties	Total	Rank	Penalties	Penalties	Rank
Stefano Brecciaroli	Apollo WD Wendi Kurt Hoev	Individual	38.50	2	11.60	50.10	16	11.00	61.10	25 Q	8.00	69.10	19
Vittoria Panizzon	Borough Pennyz	Individual	53.50	=46	0.00	53.50	22	1.00	54.50	15 Q	0.00	54.50	11

== Fencing ==
Italy has qualified 15 fencers.

Men

Athlete	Event	Round of 64	Round of 32	Round of 16	Quarterfinal	Semifinal	Final / BM	
Athlete	Event	Opposition Score	Opposition Score	Opposition Score	Opposition Score	Opposition Score	Opposition Score	Rank
Paolo Pizzo	Individual épée	—N/a	Leung (HKG); W 15–14	Bouzaid (SEN); W 15–11	Limardo (VEN); L 12–15	Did not advance		
Valerio Aspromonte	Individual foil	Bye	Dărăban (ROU); W 15–11	Bachmann (GER); W 15–11	Lei S (CHN); L 8–15	Did not advance		
Andrea Baldini	Individual foil	Bye	Miyake (JPN); W 15–6	Imboden (USA); W 15–9	Cheremisinov (RUS); W 15–5	Lei S (CHN); L 11–15	Choi B-c (KOR); L 14–15	4
Andrea Cassarà	Individual foil	Bye	Samandi (TUN); W 15–7	Ota (JPN); W 15–14	Abouelkassem (EGY); L 10–15	Did not advance		
Valerio Aspromonte; Giorgio Avola; Andrea Baldini; Andrea Cassarà	Team foil	—N/a			Great Britain; W 45–40	United States; W 45–24	Japan; W 45–39	1st place, gold medalist(s)
Aldo Montano	Individual sabre	Bye	Pryiemka (BLR); W 15–9	Occhiuzzi (ITA); L 13–15	Did not advance			
Diego Occhiuzzi	Individual sabre	Bye	Liu X (CHN); W 15–9	Montano (ITA); W 15–13	Morehouse (USA); W 15–9	Dumitrescu (ROM); W 15–11	Szilágyi (HUN); L 8–15	2nd place, silver medalist(s)
Luigi Tarantino	Individual sabre	Bye	Hartung (GER); L 14–15	Did not advance				
Aldo Montano; Diego Occhiuzzi; Luigi Tarantino; Luigi Samele	Team sabre	—N/a			Belarus; W 45–44	South Korea; L 37–45	Russia; W 45–40	3rd place, bronze medalist(s)

Women

Athlete	Event	Round of 64	Round of 32	Round of 16	Quarterfinal	Semifinal	Final / BM	
Athlete	Event	Opposition Score	Opposition Score	Opposition Score	Opposition Score	Opposition Score	Opposition Score	Rank
Bianca Del Carretto	Individual épée	Bye	Heidemann (GER); L 13–14	Did not advance				
Rossella Fiamingo	Individual épée	Bye	Nakano (JPN); W 15–11	Lawrence (USA); W 15–7	Sun Yj (CHN); L 14–15	Did not advance		
Mara Navarria	Individual épée	Bye	Lawrence (USA); L 12–15	Did not advance				
Bianca Del Carretto; Rossella Fiamingo; Mara Navarria; Nathalie Moellhausen	Team épée	—N/a			United States; L 35-45	Did not advance		
Elisa Di Francisca	Individual foil	Bye	Shaito (LIB); W 15–2	Golubytskyi (GER); W 15–9	Sugawara (JPN); W 15–9	Nam H-h (KOR); W 11–10	Errigo (ITA); W 12-11	1st place, gold medalist(s)
Arianna Errigo	Individual foil	Bye	Fuenmayor (VEN); W 15–4	Gafurzianova (RUS); W 15–7	Kiefer (USA); W 15–10	Vezzali (ITA); W 15–12	Di Francisca (ITA); L 11-12	2nd place, silver medalist(s)
Valentina Vezzali	Individual foil	Bye	Nishioka (JPN); W 15–8	Chen Jy (CHN); W 15–6	Boubakri (TUN); W 15–7	Errigo (ITA); L 12–15	Nam H-h (KOR); W 13-12	3rd place, bronze medalist(s)
Elisa Di Francisca; Arianna Errigo; Valentina Vezzali; Ilaria Salvatori	Team foil	—N/a			Great Britain; W 42–14	France; W 45–22	Russia; W 45–31	1st place, gold medalist(s)
Gioia Marzocca	Individual sabre	—N/a	Pérez Maurice (ARG); W 15–10	Kim J-y (KOR); L 7–15	Did not advance			
Irene Vecchi	Individual sabre	—N/a	Williams (GBR); W 15–6	Chen Xd (CHN); W 15–10	Kharlan (UKR); L 9–15	Did not advance		

== Gymnastics ==
=== Artistic ===
Men
Team

Athlete	Event	Qualification								Final							
Athlete	Event	Apparatus						Total	Rank	Apparatus						Total	Rank
Athlete	Event	F	PH	R	V	PB	HB	Total	Rank	F	PH	R	V	PB	HB	Total	Rank
Matteo Angioletti	Team	14.033	—N/a	15.066	15.566	—N/a				Did not advance							
Alberto Busnari	Team	—N/a	15.058 Q	—N/a		13.766	12.100	—N/a		Did not advance							
Matteo Morandi	Team	14.133	0.000	15.766 Q	15.633	14.500	0.000	60.032	41	Did not advance							
Paolo Ottavi	Team	14.266	13.700	14.866	14.933	14.500	14.066	86.331	24 Q	Did not advance							
Enrico Pozzo	Team	14.766	13.633	14.033	15.600	14.366	14.500	86.698	21 Q	Did not advance							
Total	Team	43.165	42.391	45.698	46.799	43.366	40.666	262.085	11	Did not advance							

Individual finals

Athlete	Event	Apparatus						Total	Rank
Athlete	Event	F	PH	R	V	PB	HB	Total	Rank
Alberto Busnari	Pommel horse	—N/a	15.400	—N/a				15.400	4
Matteo Morandi	Rings	—N/a		15.733	—N/a			15.733	3rd place, bronze medalist(s)
Paolo Ottavi	All-around	12.466	14.033	15.016	15.000	14.100	14.033	84.648	22
Enrico Pozzo	All-around	14.700	13.900	14.000	15.466	14.533	14.433	87.032	18

Women
Team

Athlete	Event	Qualification						Final					
Athlete	Event	Apparatus				Total	Rank	Apparatus				Total	Rank
Athlete	Event	F	V	UB	BB	Total	Rank	F	V	UB	BB	Total	Rank
Giorgia Campana	Team	—N/a		12.766	—N/a			—N/a	13.900	—N/a			
Erika Fasana	Team	14.033	14.000	13.666	12.266	53.965	30	13.733	13.600	14.233	—N/a	—N/a	
Carlotta Ferlito	Team	13.900	14.100	13.075	14.425	55.500	20 Q	14.300	—N/a	14.100	14.366	—N/a	
Vanessa Ferrari	Team	14.900 Q	14.366	14.233	14.433	57.932	7 Q	14.333	14.166	13.566	14.800	—N/a	
Elisabetta Preziosa	Team	13.300	13.733	—N/a	13.266	—N/a		—N/a			12.833	—N/a	
Total	Team	42.833	42.466	40.974	42.124	168.397	7 Q	42.366	41.666	41.899	41.999	167.930	7

Individual finals

Athlete	Event	Apparatus				Total	Rank
Athlete	Event	F	V	UB	BB	Total	Rank
Carlotta Ferlito	All-around	12.733	14.166	13.433	14.766	55.098	21
Vanessa Ferrari	All-around	14.866	14.600	14.033	14.500	57.999	8
Vanessa Ferrari	Floor	14.900	—N/a			14.900	4

=== Rhythmic ===
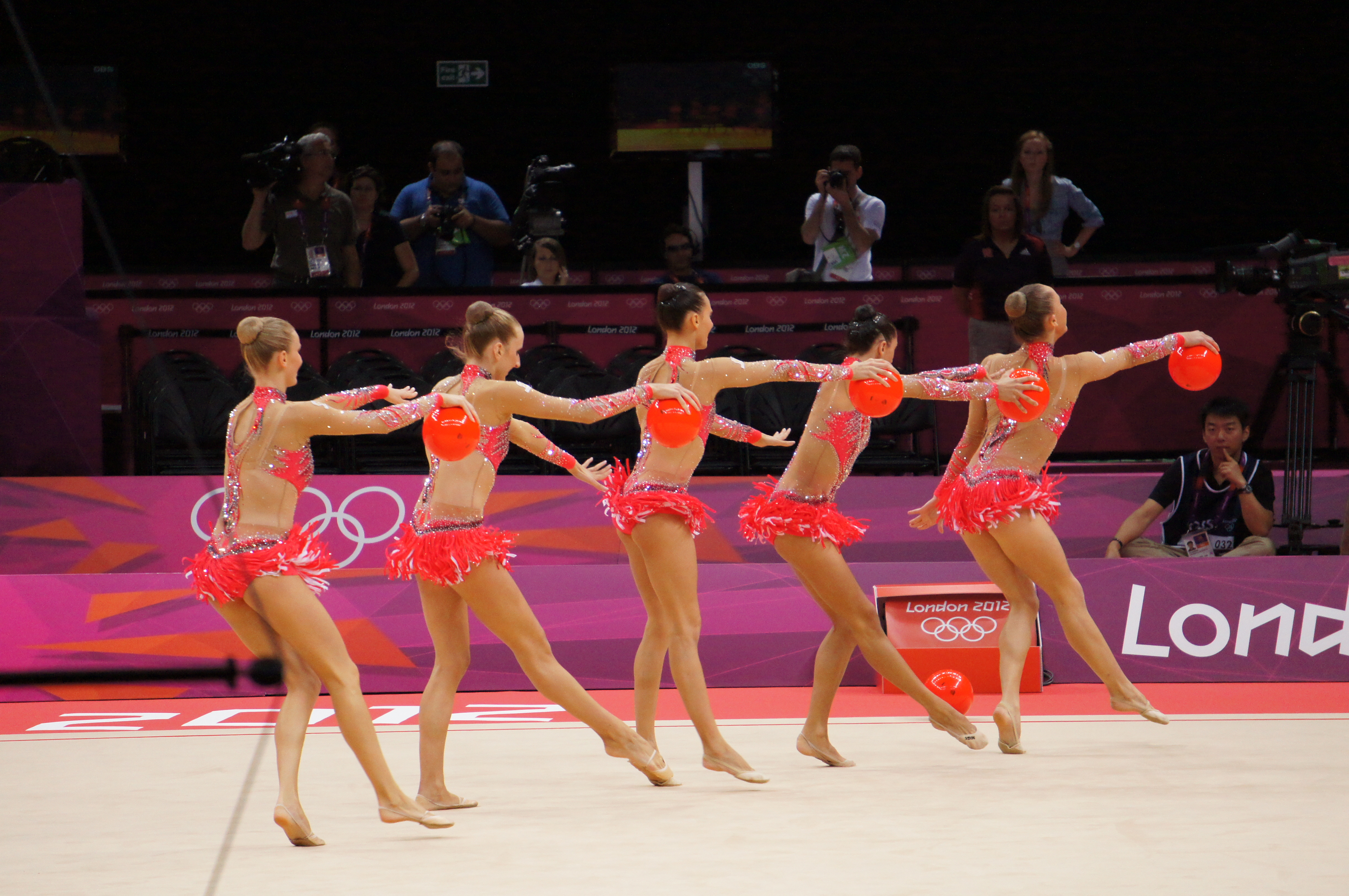
Italy performs a ball routine in the team all-around final

Athlete	Event	Qualification						Final					
Athlete	Event	Hoop	Ball	Clubs	Ribbon	Total	Rank	Hoop	Ball	Clubs	Ribbon	Total	Rank
Julieta Cantaluppi	Individual	25.200	26.675	26.850	26.550	105.275	16	Did not advance					

Athlete	Event	Qualification				Final			
Athlete	Event	5 balls	3 ribbons 2 hoops	Total	Rank	5 balls	3 ribbons 2 hoops	Total	Rank
Elisa Blanchi; Romina Laurito; Marta Pagnini; Elisa Santoni; Anzhelika Savrayuk; Andreea Stefanescu	Team	28.100	27.700	55.800	2 Q	28.125	27.325	55.450	3rd place, bronze medalist(s)

=== Trampoline ===
Athlete	Event	Qualification		Final	
Athlete	Event	Score	Rank	Score	Rank
Flavio Cannone	Men's	104.170	11	Did not advance	

== Judo ==
Italy has qualified 9 judokas.

Men

Athlete	Event	Round of 64	Round of 32	Round of 16	Quarterfinals	Semifinals	Repechage	Final / BM	
Athlete	Event	Opposition Result	Opposition Result	Opposition Result	Opposition Result	Opposition Result	Opposition Result	Opposition Result	Rank
Elio Verde	−60 kg	Postigos (PER); W 0100–0001	Zantaraia (UKR); W 0001–0000	Castillo (MEX); W 0101–0001	Davtyan (ARM); W 0001–0000	Hiraoka (JPN); L 0000–0110	Bye	Kitadai (BRA); L 0000–0011	5
Francesco Faraldo	−66 kg	Uriarte (ESP); L 0000–0100	Did not advance						
Antonio Ciano	−81 kg	Bye	Bischof (GER); L 0000–0101	Did not advance					
Roberto Meloni	−90 kg	—N/a	Sobirov (TJK); W 0101–0013	Camilo (BRA); L 0001–1011	Did not advance				

Women

Athlete	Event	Round of 32	Round of 16	Quarterfinals	Semifinals	Repechage	Final / BM	
Athlete	Event	Opposition Result	Opposition Result	Opposition Result	Opposition Result	Opposition Result	Opposition Result	Rank
Elena Moretti	−48 kg	Bye	Pareto (ARG); L 0000–0001	Did not advance				
Rosalba Forciniti	−52 kg	Bye	Tarangul (GER); W 0010–0002	Kim K-O (KOR); W 0001–0001	An K-A (PRK); L 0000–0101	Bye	Müller (LUX); W 0000–0001	3rd place, bronze medalist(s)
Giulia Quintavalle	−57 kg	Bye	Kim J-D (KOR); W 1011–0002	Matsumoto (JPN); L 0001–0010	Did not advance	Filzmoser (AUT); W 0100–0001	Malloy (USA); L 0001–0100	5
Edwige Gwend	−63 kg	Bye	Xu L (CHN); L 0002–0211	Did not advance				
Erica Barbieri	−70 kg	Hwang Y-S (KOR); L 0001–0102	Did not advance					

== Modern pentathlon ==
Italy has qualified 2 men and 2 women.

Athlete	Event	Fencing (épée one touch)			Swimming (200 m freestyle)			Riding (show jumping)			Combined: shooting/running (10 m air pistol)/(3000 m)			Total points	Final rank
Athlete	Event	Results	Rank	MP points	Time	Rank	MP points	Penalties	Rank	MP points	Time	Rank	MP Points	Total points	Final rank
Nicola Benedetti	Men's	17–18	=13	808	2:18.47	36	1140	116	26	1084	10:16.92	1	2536 OR	5568	20
Riccardo de Luca	Men's	16–19	=20	784	2:08.29	24	1264	0	3	1200	10:32.34	5	2472	5720	9
Claudia Cesarini	Women's	15–20	=25	760	2:22.77	29	1088	156	30	1044	12:25.66	19	2020	4912	25
Sabrina Crognale	Women's	20–15	=8	880	2:24.24	30	1072	78	18	1128	13:27.22	33	1772	4852	27

== Rowing ==
Italy has qualified the following boats.

Men

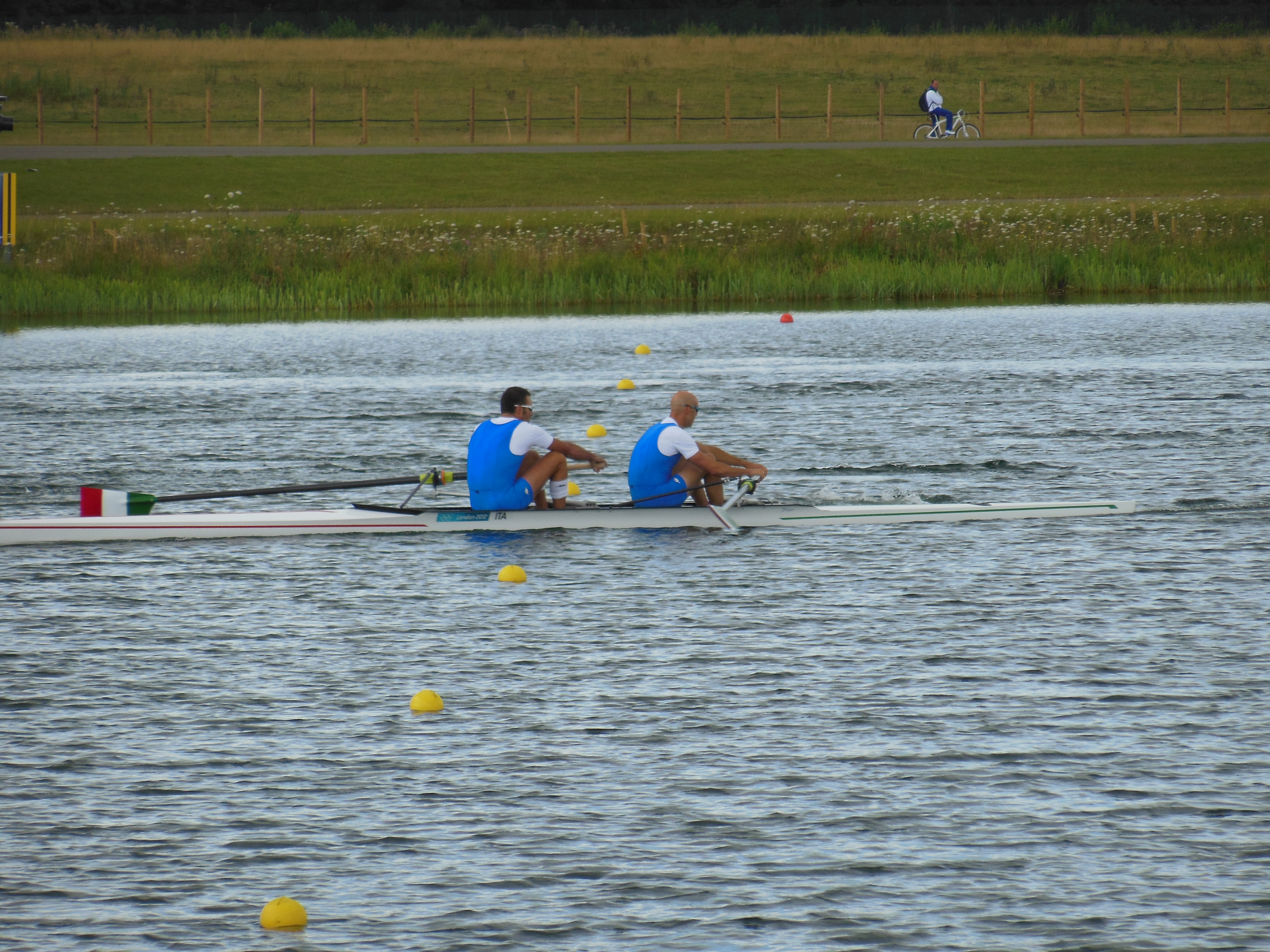
Italy during the final of the men's coxless pair.

Athlete	Event	Heats		Repechage		Semifinals		Final	
Athlete	Event	Time	Rank	Time	Rank	Time	Rank	Time	Rank
Lorenzo Carboncini; Niccolò Mornati	Pair	6:18.33	2 SA/B	Bye		6:55.82	2 FA	6:26.17	4
Romano Battisti; Alessio Sartori	Double sculls	6:18.50	2 SA/B	Bye		6:20.68	2 FA	6:32.80	2nd place, silver medalist(s)
Elia Luini; Pietro Ruta	Lightweight double sculls	6:35.72	1 SA/B	Bye		6:41.17	5 FB	6:29.92	7
Luca Agamennoni; Vincenzo Capelli; Mario Paonessa; Simone Venier	Four	6:02.01	4 R	6:04.27	3 SA/B	6:05.00	4 FB	6:09.42	8
Francesco Fossi; Pierpaolo Frattini; Simone Raineri; Matteo Stefanini	Quadruple sculls	6:08.99	5 R	5:44.57	2 SA/B	6:18.96	6 FB	6:02.57	11
Andrea Caianiello; Daniele Danesin; Martino Goretti; Marcello Miani	Lightweight four	5:56.71	4 R	6:01.66	2 SA/B	6:08.44	5 FB	6:14.63	12

Women

Athlete	Event	Heats		Repechage		Final	
Athlete	Event	Time	Rank	Time	Rank	Time	Rank
Sara Bertolasi; Claudia Wurzel	Pair	7:21.44	5 R	7:18.14	4 FB	8:06.14	10

Qualification Legend: FA=Final A (medal); FB=Final B (non-medal); SA/B=Semifinals A/B; R=Repechage

== Sailing ==
Italy has so far qualified 1 boat for each of the following events.

Men

Athlete	Event	Race											Net points	Final rank
Athlete	Event	1	2	3	4	5	6	7	8	9	10	M*	Net points	Final rank
Federico Esposito	RS:X	31	30	33	31	32	~~36~~	33	35	29	15	EL	269	34
Michele Regolo	Laser	31	35	~~46~~	10	21	32	45	35	43	30	EL	280	35
Filippo Maria Baldassari	Finn	20	22	~~24~~	21	14	21	17	18	18	13	EL	164	22
Gabrio Zandonà; Pietro Zucchetti	470	6	~~26~~	1	8	6	14	8	4	11	3	12	72	4

Women

Athlete	Event	Race											Net points	Final rank
Athlete	Event	1	2	3	4	5	6	7	8	9	10	M*	Net points	Final rank
Alessandra Sensini	RS:X	~~12~~	9	11	8	11	9	6	6	10	9	16	95	9
Francesca Clapcich	Laser Radial	20	16	24	7	9	~~27~~	18	25	21	19	EL	159	19
Giulia Conti; Giovanna Micol	470	8	11	~~18~~	2	3	1	16	17	6	7	4	73	5

Open

Athlete	Event	Race																Net points	Final rank
Athlete	Event	1	2	3	4	5	6	7	8	9	10	11	12	13	14	15	M*	Net points	Final rank
Giuseppe Angilella; Gianfranco Sibello	49er	14	11	13	10	11	7	8	12	15	3	13	~~18~~	9	5	1	16	148	9

M = Medal race; EL = Eliminated – did not advance into the medal race;

== Shooting ==
Italy has gained fifteen quota places in the shooting events;

Men

Athlete	Event	Qualification		Final	
Athlete	Event	Points	Rank	Points	Rank
Francesco Bruno	50 m pistol	553	24	Did not advance	
Francesco Bruno	10 m air pistol	574	29	Did not advance	
Niccolò Campriani	10 m air rifle	599	1 Q	701.5	2nd place, silver medalist(s)
Niccolò Campriani	50 m rifle prone	595 (51.7)	6 Q	697.6	8
Niccolò Campriani	50 m rifle 3 positions	1180 OR	1 Q	1278.5 OR	1st place, gold medalist(s)
Francesco d'Aniello	Double trap	136	8	Did not advance	
Marco de Nicolo	10 m air rifle	590	34	Did not advance	
Marco de Nicolo	50 m rifle prone	589	36	Did not advance	
Marco de Nicolo	50 m rifle 3 positions	1165	15	Did not advance	
Daniele di Spigno	Double trap	131	18	Did not advance	
Massimo Fabbrizi	Trap	123	4 Q	146 S/O 5	2nd place, silver medalist(s)
Ennio Falco	Skeet	118	14	Did not advance	
Giuseppe Giordano	50 m pistol	559 (49.6)	8 Q	656	5
Luigi Lodde	Skeet	120	5 Q	143	5
Giovanni Pellielo	Trap	121	8	Did not advance	
Luca Tesconi	10 m air pistol	584	5 Q	685.8	2nd place, silver medalist(s)

Women

Athlete	Event	Qualification		Final	
Athlete	Event	Points	Rank	Points	Rank
Chiara Cainero	Skeet	67 S/O 2	6 Q	89	5
Elania Nardelli	10 m air rifle	390	46	Did not advance	
Elania Nardelli	50 m rifle 3 positions	574	35	Did not advance	
Jessica Rossi	Trap	75 WR	1 Q	99 WR	1st place, gold medalist(s)
Petra Zublasing	10 m air rifle	396	12	Did not advance	
Petra Zublasing	50 m rifle 3 positions	581	12	Did not advance	

== Swimming ==
Italian swimmers have so far achieved qualifying standards in the following events (up to a maximum of 2 swimmers in each event at the Olympic Qualifying Time (OQT), and 1 at the Olympic Selection Time (OST): In the list, the names of the swimmers qualified at an individual event.

Men

Athlete	Event	Heat		Semifinal		Final	
Athlete	Event	Time	Rank	Time	Rank	Time	Rank
Marco Belotti	200 m freestyle	1:49.14	29	Did not advance			
Valerio Cleri	10 km open water	—N/a				1:51:29.5	17
Gabriele Detti	1500 m freestyle	15:06.22	13	—N/a		Did not advance	
Mirco di Tora	100 m backstroke	54.70	19	Did not advance			
Luca Dotto	50 m freestyle	22.12	=11 Q	22.09	13	Did not advance	
Luca Dotto	100 m freestyle	49.43	22	Did not advance			
Filippo Magnini	100 m freestyle	49.18	19	Did not advance			
Luca Marin	400 m individual medley	4:13.02	6 Q	—N/a		4:14.89	8
Marco Orsi	50 m freestyle	22.36	19	Did not advance			
Gregorio Paltrinieri	1500 m freestyle	14:50.11	4 Q	—N/a		14:51.92	5
Mattia Pesce	100 m breaststroke	1:01.27	=23	Did not advance			
Samuel Pizzetti	400 m freestyle	3:50.93	18	—N/a		Did not advance	
Sebastiano Ranfagni	200 m backstroke	1:58.76	19	Did not advance			
Matteo Rivolta	100 m butterfly	52.50	22	Did not advance			
Fabio Scozzoli	100 m breaststroke	59.99	12 Q	59.44	2 Q	59.97	7
Federico Turrini	200 m individual medley	2:00.63	20	Did not advance			
Federico Turrini	400 m individual medley	4:17.22	19	—N/a		Did not advance	
Luca Dotto; Filippo Magnini; Marco Orsi; Andrea Rolla; Michele Santucci	4 × 100 m freestyle relay	3:15.78	8 Q	—N/a		3:14.13	7
Marco Belotti; Alex di Giorgio; Riccardo Maestri; Gianluca Maglia	4 × 200 m freestyle relay	7:12.69	11	—N/a		Did not advance	
Mirco di Tora; Luca Dotto; Matteo Rivolta; Fabio Scozzoli	4 × 100 m medley relay	3:36.68	14	—N/a		Did not advance	

Women

Athlete	Event	Heat		Semifinal		Final	
Athlete	Event	Time	Rank	Time	Rank	Time	Rank
Arianna Barbieri	100 m backstroke	1:00.25	16 Q	1:00.27	13	Did not advance	
Ilaria Bianchi	100 m butterfly	58.42	12 Q	57.79 NR	8 Q	57.27 NR	5
Chiara Boggiatto	200 m breaststroke	2:27.74	22	Did not advance			
Erika Ferraioli	50 m freestyle	25.69	32	Did not advance			
Alessia Filippi	200 m backstroke	2:12.40	23	Did not advance			
Elena Gemo	100 m backstroke	1:01.77	27	Did not advance			
Martina Grimaldi	10 km open water	—N/a				1:57:41.8	3rd place, bronze medalist(s)
Michela Guzzetti	100 m breaststroke	1:08.83	27	Did not advance			
Federica Pellegrini	200 m freestyle	1:57.16	1 Q	1:56.67	4 Q	1:56.73	5
Federica Pellegrini	400 m freestyle	4:05.30	7 Q	—N/a		4:04.50	5
Stefania Pirozzi	400 m individual medley	4:45.61	22	—N/a		Did not advance	
Erika Ferraioli; Laura Letrari; Alice Mizzau; Federica Pellegrini	4 × 100 m freestyle relay	3:39.74	12	—N/a		Did not advance	
Diletta Carli; Alice Mizzau; Alice Nesti; Federica Pellegrini	4 × 200 m freestyle relay	7:57.75	4 Q	—N/a		7:56.30	7
Arianna Barbieri; Ilaria Bianchi; Michela Guzzetti; Federica Pellegrini	4 × 100 m medley relay	4:02.20	11	—N/a		Did not advance	

== Synchronized swimming ==
Italy has qualified 2 quota places in synchronized swimming.

Athlete	Event	Technical routine		Free routine (preliminary)			Free routine (final)		
Athlete	Event	Points	Rank	Points	Total (technical + free)	Rank	Points	Total (technical + free)	Rank
Giulia Lapi; Mariangela Perrupato	Duet	90.700	7	90.740	181.440	7 Q	90.720	181.420	7

== Table tennis ==
Italy has qualified the following table tennis players.

Athlete	Event	Preliminary round	Round 1	Round 2	Round 3	Round 4	Quarterfinals	Semifinals	Final / BM	
Athlete	Event	Opposition Result	Opposition Result	Opposition Result	Opposition Result	Opposition Result	Opposition Result	Opposition Result	Opposition Result	Rank
Mihai Bobocica	Men's singles	Bye	Pereira (CUB); W 4–0	Schlager (AUT); L 2–4	Did not advance					
Tan Wenling	Women's singles	Bye	Oshonaike (NGR); W 4–0	Tikhomirova (RUS); L 3–4	Did not advance					

== Taekwondo ==
Mauro Sarmiento has ensured a quota place for Italy in the men's −80 kg by reaching the top 3 of the 2011 WTF World Qualification Tournament. Italy also qualified in the men's +80 kg during the European Championships.

Athlete	Event	Round of 16	Quarterfinals	Semifinals	Repechage	Bronze Medal	Final	
Athlete	Event	Opposition Result	Opposition Result	Opposition Result	Opposition Result	Opposition Result	Opposition Result	Rank
Mauro Sarmiento	Men's −80 kg	Abduraim (KGZ); W 5–1	Azizov (AZE); W 2–1	García (ESP); L 1–2	Bye	Bahave (AFG); W 4–0	Did not advance	3rd place, bronze medalist(s)
Carlo Molfetta	Men's +80 kg	Gulov (TJK); W 7–3	Liu Xb (CHN); W 6–5 SDP	Keita (MLI); W 6–4	Bye		Obame (GAB); W 9–9 SUP	1st place, gold medalist(s)

== Tennis ==
Italy had qualified players from the top 54 rankings of ATP and WTA rankings (up to 4 players per nation, with the possibility of forming two teams of doubles) at the end of 2012 French Open, on 11 June 2012.

Men

Athlete	Event	Round of 64	Round of 32	Round of 16	Quarterfinals	Semifinals	Final / BM	
Athlete	Event	Opposition Score	Opposition Score	Opposition Score	Opposition Score	Opposition Score	Opposition Score	Rank
Fabio Fognini	Singles	Djokovic (SRB); L 7–6^{(9–7)}, 2–6, 2–6	Did not advance					
Andreas Seppi	Singles	Young (USA); W 6–4, 6–4	del Potro (ARG); L 3–6, 6–7^{(2–7)}	Did not advance				
Daniele Bracciali; Andreas Seppi	Doubles	—N/a	Berdych / Štěpánek (CZE); L 6–4, 6–7^{(5–7)}, 4-6	Did not advance				

Women

Athlete	Event	Round of 64	Round of 32	Round of 16	Quarterfinals	Semifinals	Final / BM	
Athlete	Event	Opposition Score	Opposition Score	Opposition Score	Opposition Score	Opposition Score	Opposition Score	Rank
Sara Errani	Singles	V. Williams (USA); L 3–6, 1–6	Did not advance					
Flavia Pennetta	Singles	Cîrstea (ROU); W 6–2, 4–6, 6–2	Pironkova (BUL); W 7–5, 6–1	Kvitová (CZE); L 3–6, 0–6	Did not advance			
Francesca Schiavone	Singles	Zakopalová (CZE); W 6–3, 3–6, 6–4	Zvonareva (RUS); L 3–6, 3–6	Did not advance				
Roberta Vinci	Singles	Clijsters (BEL); L 1–6, 4–6	Did not advance					
Sara Errani; Roberta Vinci	Doubles	—N/a	Cetkovská / Šafářová (CZE); W 6–2, 6–3	Klepač / Srebotnik (SLO); W 7–5, 4–6, 6–4	S. Williams / V. Williams (USA); L 1–6, 1–6	Did not advance		
Flavia Pennetta; Francesca Schiavone	Doubles	—N/a	Medina Garrigues / Parra Santonja (ESP); W 7–6^{(7–4)}, 6–4	Chuang / Hsieh (TPE); L 7–6^{(7–3)}, 5–7, 4–6	Did not advance			

Mixed

Athlete	Event	Round of 16	Quarterfinals	Semifinals	Final / BM	
Athlete	Event	Opposition Score	Opposition Score	Opposition Score	Opposition Score	Rank
Sara Errani; Andreas Seppi	Doubles	Raymond / M Bryan (USA); L 5–7, 3–6	Did not advance			
Roberta Vinci; Daniele Bracciali	Doubles	Arvidsson / Lindstedt (SWE); W 6–3, 4–6, 10–8	Lisicki / Kas (GER); L 6–4, 6–7^{(2–7)}, 7–10	Did not advance		

== Triathlon ==
Three athletes have qualified for the Italian team.

Athlete	Event	Swim (1.5 km)	Trans 1	Bike (40 km)	Trans 2	Run (10 km)	Total Time	Rank
Alessandro Fabian	Men's	17:01	0:41	59:10	0:28	30:43	1:48:03	10
Davide Uccellari	Men's	18:26	0:44	59:16	0:30	31:13	1:50:09	29
Annamaria Mazzetti	Women's	19:25	0:40	1:11:09	0:35	37:19	2:09:08	46

== Volleyball ==
=== Beach ===
Athlete	Event	Preliminary round	Standing	Round of 16	Quarterfinals	Semifinals	Final / BM	
Athlete	Event	Opposition Score	Standing	Opposition Score	Opposition Score	Opposition Score	Opposition Score	Rank
Daniele Lupo; Paolo Nicolai	Men's	Pool A Bellaguarda – Heuscher (SUI); W 2 – 0 (21–19, 21–18); Doppler – Horst (AUT); L 0 – 2 (18–21, 17–21); Alison – Emanuel (BRA); L 0 – 2 (24–26, 18–21); Lucky Losers; Binstock – Reader (CAN); W 2 – 0 (21–16, 22–20)	3 Q	Dalhausser – Rogers (USA); W 2 – 0 (21–17, 21–19)	Nummerdor – Schuil (NED); L 0 – 2 (16–21, 18–21)	Did not advance		5
Greta Cicolari; Marta Menegatti	Women's	Pool F Khomyakova – Ukolova (RUS); W 2 – 1 (17–21, 21–18, 15–8); Dampney – Mullin (GBR); W 2 – 0 (21–18, 21–12); Lessard – Martin (CAN); W 2 – 1 (21–12, 23–25, 15–10)	1 Q	Baquerizo – Fernández (ESP); W 2 – 0 (21–15, 21–15)	May-Treanor – Walsh Jennings (USA); L 0 – 2 (13–21, 13–21)	Did not advance		5

=== Indoor ===
Italy has qualified both a men's and women's team for the indoor tournaments.

- Men's team event – 1 team of 12 players
- Women's team event – 1 team of 12 players

==== Men's tournament ====
Roster

The following is the Italian roster in the men's volleyball tournament of the 2012 Summer Olympics.

Head coach: Mauro Berruto

№	Name	Date of birth	Height	Weight	Spike	Block	2012 club
1	Luigi Mastrangelo	17 August 1975	2.02 m (6 ft 8 in)	90 kg (200 lb)	368 cm (145 in)	336 cm (132 in)	(Italy) Bre Banca Lannutti Cuneo
3	Simone Parodi	16 June 1986	1.96 m (6 ft 5 in)	82 kg (181 lb)	350 cm (140 in)	335 cm (132 in)	(Italy) Lube Banca Marche Macerata
6	Samuele Papi	20 May 1973	1.90 m (6 ft 3 in)	84 kg (185 lb)	345 cm (136 in)	310 cm (120 in)	(Italy) Copra Elior Piacenza
7	Michal Lasko	11 March 1981	2.02 m (6 ft 8 in)	104 kg (229 lb)	348 cm (137 in)	337 cm (133 in)	(Poland) Jastrzębski Węgiel
9	Ivan Zaytsev	2 October 1988	2.02 m (6 ft 8 in)	92 kg (203 lb)	355 cm (140 in)	348 cm (137 in)	(Italy) Lube Banca Marche Macerata
10	Dante Boninfante	7 March 1977	1.88 m (6 ft 2 in)	85 kg (187 lb)	334 cm (131 in)	315 cm (124 in)	(Italy) M. Roma Volley
11	Cristian Savani (c)	22 February 1982	1.95 m (6 ft 5 in)	95 kg (209 lb)	354 cm (139 in)	335 cm (132 in)	(Italy) Lube Banca Marche Macerata
13	Dragan Travica	28 August 1986	2.00 m (6 ft 7 in)	94 kg (207 lb)	335 cm (132 in)	320 cm (130 in)	(Italy) Lube Banca Marche Macerata
14	Alessandro Fei	29 November 1978	2.04 m (6 ft 8 in)	90 kg (200 lb)	358 cm (141 in)	336 cm (132 in)	(Italy) Copra Elior Piacenza
15	Emanuele Birarelli	8 February 1981	2.01 m (6 ft 7 in)	98 kg (216 lb)	345 cm (136 in)	316 cm (124 in)	(Italy) Trentino Diatec
16	Andrea Bari (L)	5 March 1980	1.84 m (6 ft 0 in)	80 kg (180 lb)	327 cm (129 in)	310 cm (120 in)	(Italy) Trentino Diatec
17	Andrea Giovi (L)	19 August 1983	1.83 m (6 ft 0 in)	80 kg (180 lb)	310 cm (120 in)	290 cm (110 in)	(Italy) Sir Safety Perugia

Group play

Pos	Team	Pld	W	L	Pts	SW	SL	SR	SPW	SPL	SPR
1	Bulgaria	5	4	1	12	13	4	3.250	407	390	1.044
2	Poland	5	3	2	9	11	7	1.571	433	374	1.158
3	Argentina	5	3	2	9	10	7	1.429	382	367	1.041
4	Italy	5	3	2	8	10	9	1.111	426	413	1.031
5	Australia	5	2	3	7	8	10	0.800	395	397	0.995
6	Great Britain	5	0	5	0	0	15	0.000	274	376	0.729

29 July 2012; 20:00	Italy	1–3	Poland	Earls Court Exhibition Centre, London; Attendance: 15,000; Referees: Rolando Cholakian (ARG), Zorica Bjelić (SRB)
29 July 2012; 20:00	(25–21, 20–25, 23–25, 14–25); Results Statistics			Earls Court Exhibition Centre, London; Attendance: 15,000; Referees: Rolando Cholakian (ARG), Zorica Bjelić (SRB)

31 July 2012; 14:45	Italy	3–1	Argentina	Earls Court Exhibition Centre, London; Attendance: 12,500; Referees: Ibrahim Al-Naama (QAT), Frans Loderus (NED)
31 July 2012; 14:45	(25–17, 21–25, 25–17, 25–23); Results Statistics			Earls Court Exhibition Centre, London; Attendance: 12,500; Referees: Ibrahim Al-Naama (QAT), Frans Loderus (NED)

2 August 2012; 22:30	Great Britain	0–3	Italy	Earls Court Exhibition Centre, London; Attendance: 11,500; Referees: Rogerio Espicalsky (BRA), Nasr Shaaban (EGY)
2 August 2012; 22:30	(19–25, 16–25, 20–25); Results Statistics			Earls Court Exhibition Centre, London; Attendance: 11,500; Referees: Rogerio Espicalsky (BRA), Nasr Shaaban (EGY)

4 August 2012; 14:45	Australia	2–3	Italy	Earls Court Exhibition Centre, London; Attendance: 11,500; Referees: Andrey Zenovich (RUS), Rogerio Espicalsky (BRA)
4 August 2012; 14:45	(25–21, 25–18, 21–25, 14–25, 13–15); Results Statistics			Earls Court Exhibition Centre, London; Attendance: 11,500; Referees: Andrey Zenovich (RUS), Rogerio Espicalsky (BRA)

6 August 2012; 14:45	Italy	0–3	Bulgaria	Earls Court Exhibition Centre, London; Attendance: 14,000; Referees: Akihiko Tano (JPN), Bela Hobor (HUN)
6 August 2012; 14:45	(30–32, 20–25, 19–25); Results Statistics			Earls Court Exhibition Centre, London; Attendance: 14,000; Referees: Akihiko Tano (JPN), Bela Hobor (HUN)

Quarterfinal

8 August 2012; 16:00	United States	0–3	Italy	Earls Court Exhibition Centre, London; Attendance: 14,000; Referees: Wang Ning (CHN), Georgios Karampetsos (GRE)
8 August 2012; 16:00	(26–28, 20–25, 20–25); Results Statistics			Earls Court Exhibition Centre, London; Attendance: 14,000; Referees: Wang Ning (CHN), Georgios Karampetsos (GRE)

Semifinal

10 August 2012; 19:30	Brazil	3–0	Italy	Earls Court Exhibition Centre, London; Attendance: 14,000; Referees: Akihiko Tano (JPN), Ibrahim Al-Naama (QAT)
10 August 2012; 19:30	(25–21, 25–12, 25–21); Results Statistics			Earls Court Exhibition Centre, London; Attendance: 14,000; Referees: Akihiko Tano (JPN), Ibrahim Al-Naama (QAT)

Bronze medal match

12 August 2012; 09:30	Bulgaria	1–3	Italy	Earls Court Exhibition Centre, London; Attendance: 12,000; Referees: Frans Loderus (NED), Rolando Cholakian (ARG)
12 August 2012; 09:30	(19–25, 25–23, 22–25, 21–25); Results Statistics			Earls Court Exhibition Centre, London; Attendance: 12,000; Referees: Frans Loderus (NED), Rolando Cholakian (ARG)

==== Women's tournament ====
Roster

The following is the Italian roster in the women's volleyball tournament of the 2012 Summer Olympics.

Head coach: Massimo Barbolini

№	Name	Date of birth	Height	Weight	Spike	Block	2012 club
3	Paola Croce	6 March 1978	1.67 m (5 ft 6 in)	52 kg (115 lb)	290 cm (110 in)	265 cm (104 in)	(Italy) Liu·Jo Modena
5	Giulia Rondon	16 October 1987	1.89 m (6 ft 2 in)	74 kg (163 lb)	304 cm (120 in)	280 cm (110 in)	(Italy) ICOS Crema
6	Monica De Gennaro (L)	8 January 1987	1.74 m (5 ft 9 in)	67 kg (148 lb)	292 cm (115 in)	270 cm (110 in)	(Italy) Scavolini Pesaro
8	Jenny Barazza	24 July 1981	1.88 m (6 ft 2 in)	77 kg (170 lb)	300 cm (120 in)	285 cm (112 in)	(Italy) Liu·Jo Modena
9	Caterina Bosetti	2 February 1994	1.79 m (5 ft 10 in)	59 kg (130 lb)	299 cm (118 in)	281 cm (111 in)	(Italy) MC-Carnaghi Villa Cortese
12	Francesca Piccinini	10 January 1979	1.84 m (6 ft 0 in)	71 kg (157 lb)	304 cm (120 in)	279 cm (110 in)	(Italy) Norda Foppapedretti Bergamo
13	Valentina Arrighetti	26 January 1985	1.85 m (6 ft 1 in)	72 kg (159 lb)	294 cm (116 in)	280 cm (110 in)	(Italy) Norda Foppapedretti Bergamo
14	Eleonora Lo Bianco (c)	22 December 1979	1.71 m (5 ft 7 in)	67 kg (148 lb)	287 cm (113 in)	273 cm (107 in)	(Turkey) Galatasaray
15	Antonella Del Core	5 November 1980	1.80 m (5 ft 11 in)	70 kg (150 lb)	296 cm (117 in)	279 cm (110 in)	(Russia) Fakel Novy Urengoy
16	Lucia Bosetti	9 July 1989	1.75 m (5 ft 9 in)	65 kg (143 lb)	306 cm (120 in)	286 cm (113 in)	(Italy) MC-Carnaghi Villa Cortese
17	Simona Gioli	17 September 1977	1.85 m (6 ft 1 in)	70 kg (150 lb)	307 cm (121 in)	283 cm (111 in)	(Russia) Fakel Novy Urengoy
18	Carolina Costagrande	15 October 1980	1.88 m (6 ft 2 in)	80 kg (180 lb)	312 cm (123 in)	291 cm (115 in)	(China) Guangdong Evergrande

Group play

Pos	Team	Pld	W	L	Pts	SW	SL	SR	SPW	SPL	SPR	Qualification
1	Russia	5	5	0	14	15	4	3.750	459	352	1.304	Quarter-finals
2	Italy	5	4	1	13	14	5	2.800	442	368	1.201	Quarter-finals
3	Japan	5	3	2	9	11	6	1.833	401	335	1.197	Quarter-finals
4	Dominican Republic	5	2	3	6	8	9	0.889	374	362	1.033	Quarter-finals
5	Great Britain	5	1	4	2	3	14	0.214	295	396	0.745	
6	Algeria	5	0	5	1	2	15	0.133	252	410	0.615	

28 July 2012; 16:45	Italy	3–1	Dominican Republic	Earls Court Exhibition Centre, London; Attendance: 14,000; Referees: Zorica Bjelić (SRB), Rolando Cholakian (ARG)
28 July 2012; 16:45	(25–17, 23–25, 25–19, 25–15) report statistics			Earls Court Exhibition Centre, London; Attendance: 14,000; Referees: Zorica Bjelić (SRB), Rolando Cholakian (ARG)

30 July 2012; 20:00	Italy	3–1	Japan	Earls Court Exhibition Centre, London; Attendance: 13,000; Referees: Jose Mercado (PUR), Patricia Salvatore (USA)
30 July 2012; 20:00	(25–22, 25–21, 20–25, 25–22) result statistics			Earls Court Exhibition Centre, London; Attendance: 13,000; Referees: Jose Mercado (PUR), Patricia Salvatore (USA)

1 August 2012; 16:45	Great Britain	0–3	Italy	Earls Court Exhibition Centre, London; Attendance: 11,800; Referees: Zorica Bjelić (SRB), Denny Lassi (DOM)
1 August 2012; 16:45	(25–27, 12–25, 12–25) result statistics			Earls Court Exhibition Centre, London; Attendance: 11,800; Referees: Zorica Bjelić (SRB), Denny Lassi (DOM)

3 August 2012; 22:00	Algeria	0–3	Italy	Earls Court Exhibition Centre, London; Attendance: 11,000; Referees: Patricia Salvatore (USA), Wang Ning (CHN)
3 August 2012; 22:00	(11–25, 12–25, 17–25) result statistics			Earls Court Exhibition Centre, London; Attendance: 11,000; Referees: Patricia Salvatore (USA), Wang Ning (CHN)

5 August 2012; 16:45	Italy	2–3	Russia	Earls Court Exhibition Centre, London; Attendance: 10,000; Referees: Zorica Bjelić (SRB), Wang Ning (CHN)
5 August 2012; 16:45	(28–26, 19–25, 25–22, 16–25, 11–15) result statistics			Earls Court Exhibition Centre, London; Attendance: 10,000; Referees: Zorica Bjelić (SRB), Wang Ning (CHN)

Quarterfinals

7 August 2012; 21:00	Italy	1–3	South Korea	Earls Court Exhibition Centre, London; Attendance: 13,000; Referees: Rolando Cholakian (ARG), Jose Mercado (PUR)
7 August 2012; 21:00	(25–18, 21–25, 20–25, 18–25) result statistics			Earls Court Exhibition Centre, London; Attendance: 13,000; Referees: Rolando Cholakian (ARG), Jose Mercado (PUR)

== Water polo ==
=== Men's tournament ===
Team roster

The following is the Italian roster in the men's water polo tournament of the 2012 Summer Olympics.

№	Name	Pos.	Height	Weight	Date of birth	2012 club
1	Stefano Tempesti	GK	2.05 m (6 ft 9 in)	99 kg (218 lb)	9 June 1979	(Italy) Pro Recco
2	Amaurys Pérez	CB	1.94 m (6 ft 4 in)	98 kg (216 lb)	18 March 1976	(Italy) Posillipo
3	Niccolò Gitto	CB	1.85 m (6 ft 1 in)	82 kg (181 lb)	12 October 1986	(Italy) Pro Recco
4	Pietro Figlioli	D	1.92 m (6 ft 4 in)	98 kg (216 lb)	29 May 1984	(Italy) Pro Recco
5	Alex Giorgetti	D	1.87 m (6 ft 2 in)	78 kg (172 lb)	24 December 1987	(Italy) Pro Recco
6	Maurizio Felugo	D	1.89 m (6 ft 2 in)	86 kg (190 lb)	4 March 1981	(Italy) Pro Recco
7	Massimo Giacoppo	CB	1.84 m (6 ft 0 in)	90 kg (198 lb)	10 May 1983	(Italy) Pro Recco
8	Valentino Gallo	D	1.93 m (6 ft 4 in)	93 kg (205 lb)	17 July 1985	(Italy) Posillipo
9	Christian Presciutti	D	1.85 m (6 ft 1 in)	85 kg (187 lb)	27 November 1982	(Italy) AN Brescia
10	Deni Fiorentini	CB	1.91 m (6 ft 3 in)	86 kg (190 lb)	5 June 1984	(Italy) Pro Recco
11	Matteo Aicardi	CF	1.92 m (6 ft 4 in)	104 kg (229 lb)	19 April 1986	(Italy) RN Savona
12	Danijel Premuš	CF	1.86 m (6 ft 1 in)	98 kg (216 lb)	15 April 1981	(Montenegro) PVK Jadran
13	Giacomo Pastorino	GK	1.91 m (6 ft 3 in)	89 kg (196 lb)	7 June 1980	(Italy) Pro Recco

Head coach: Alessandro Campagna

Group play

Team	Pld	W	D	L	GF	GA	GD	Pts	Qualification
Croatia	5	5	0	0	50	29	+21	10	Quarterfinals
Italy	5	3	1	1	40	36	+4	7	Quarterfinals
Spain	5	3	0	2	52	42	+10	6	Quarterfinals
Australia	5	2	0	3	40	44	−4	4	Quarterfinals
Greece	5	1	1	3	41	43	−2	3	
Kazakhstan	5	0	0	5	24	53	−29	0	

29 July 2012; 14:10	Report	Italy	8–5	Australia	Water Polo Arena, London; Referees: Boris Margeta (SLO), Radoslaw Koryzna (POL)
29 July 2012; 14:10	Report	Score by quarters: 3–0, 2–2, 0–1, 3–2			Water Polo Arena, London; Referees: Boris Margeta (SLO), Radoslaw Koryzna (POL)
29 July 2012; 14:10	Report	Felugo, Giorgetti 2	Goals	five players 1	Water Polo Arena, London; Referees: Boris Margeta (SLO), Radoslaw Koryzna (POL)

31 July 2012; 15:30	Report	Greece	7–7	Italy	Water Polo Arena, London; Referees: Marijo Brguljan (MNE), Mihajlo Ćirić (SRB)
31 July 2012; 15:30	Report	Score by quarters: 2–1, 1–2, 2–3, 2–1			Water Polo Arena, London; Referees: Marijo Brguljan (MNE), Mihajlo Ćirić (SRB)
31 July 2012; 15:30	Report	Fountoulis, Afroudakis 2	Goals	Presciutti 2	Water Polo Arena, London; Referees: Marijo Brguljan (MNE), Mihajlo Ćirić (SRB)

2 August 2012; 19:40	Report	Italy	6–11	Croatia	Water Polo Arena, London; Referees: Gyorgy Juhasz (HUN), Adrian Alexandrescu (ROU)
2 August 2012; 19:40	Report	Score by quarters: 3–4, 1–1, 1–3, 1–3			Water Polo Arena, London; Referees: Gyorgy Juhasz (HUN), Adrian Alexandrescu (ROU)
2 August 2012; 19:40	Report	Figlioli, Gallo 2	Goals	Bošković, Sukno 3	Water Polo Arena, London; Referees: Gyorgy Juhasz (HUN), Adrian Alexandrescu (ROU)

4 August 2012; 15:30	Report	Italy	9–6	Kazakhstan	Water Polo Arena, London; Referees: Anton Bervoets (NED), Cory Williams (NZL)
4 August 2012; 15:30	Report	Score by quarters: 4–2, 4–2, 1–1, 0–1			Water Polo Arena, London; Referees: Anton Bervoets (NED), Cory Williams (NZL)
4 August 2012; 15:30	Report	four players 2	Goals	Shmider, Zhilyayev 2	Water Polo Arena, London; Referees: Anton Bervoets (NED), Cory Williams (NZL)

6 August 2012; 19:40	Report	Spain	7–10	Italy	Water Polo Arena, London; Referees: Adrian Alexandrescu (ROU), Dragan Stampalija (CRO)
6 August 2012; 19:40	Report	Score by quarters: 0–2, 3–4, 1–2, 3–2			Water Polo Arena, London; Referees: Adrian Alexandrescu (ROU), Dragan Stampalija (CRO)
6 August 2012; 19:40	Report	Español 3	Goals	Premuš 3	Water Polo Arena, London; Referees: Adrian Alexandrescu (ROU), Dragan Stampalija (CRO)

Quarterfinal

8 August 2012; 18:40	Report	Italy	11–9	Hungary	Water Polo Arena, London; Referees: Georgios Stavridis (GRE), Alan Balfanbayev (KAZ)
8 August 2012; 18:40	Report	Score by quarters: 2–2, 3–2, 3–1, 3–4			Water Polo Arena, London; Referees: Georgios Stavridis (GRE), Alan Balfanbayev (KAZ)
8 August 2012; 18:40	Report	three players 3	Goals	Madaras 3	Water Polo Arena, London; Referees: Georgios Stavridis (GRE), Alan Balfanbayev (KAZ)

Semifinal

10 August 2012; 19:50	Report	Italy	9–7	Serbia	Water Polo Arena, London; Referees: Sergi Sanchez (ESP), Adrian Alexandrescu (ROU)
10 August 2012; 19:50	Report	Score by quarters: 4–2, 2–2, 2–1, 1–2			Water Polo Arena, London; Referees: Sergi Sanchez (ESP), Adrian Alexandrescu (ROU)
10 August 2012; 19:50	Report	Gallo 3	Goals	Udovičić 3	Water Polo Arena, London; Referees: Sergi Sanchez (ESP), Adrian Alexandrescu (ROU)

Gold medal game

12 August 2012; 15:50	Report	(gold) Croatia	8–6	Italy (silver)	Water Polo Arena, London; Referees: Sergi Sancherz (ESP), Gyorgy Juhasz (HUN)
12 August 2012; 15:50	Report	Score by quarters: 1–2, 2–0, 2–1, 3–3			Water Polo Arena, London; Referees: Sergi Sancherz (ESP), Gyorgy Juhasz (HUN)
12 August 2012; 15:50	Report	Joković 3	Goals	Felugo 3	Water Polo Arena, London; Referees: Sergi Sancherz (ESP), Gyorgy Juhasz (HUN)

=== Women's tournament ===
The following is the Italian roster in the women's water polo tournament of the 2012 Summer Olympics.

№	Name	Pos.	Height	Weight	Date of birth	2012 club
1	Elena Gigli	GK	1.90 m (6 ft 3 in)	76 kg (168 lb)	9 July 1985	
2	Simona Abbate	CB	1.71 m (5 ft 7 in)	64 kg (141 lb)	22 August 1983	
3	Elisa Casanova	CF	1.85 m (6 ft 1 in)	100 kg (220 lb)	26 November 1973	
6	Allegra Lapi	D	1.63 m (5 ft 4 in)	55 kg (121 lb)	8 September 1985	
7	Tania Di Mario	D	1.68 m (5 ft 6 in)	59 kg (130 lb)	4 May 1979	
8	Roberta Bianconi	D	1.75 m (5 ft 9 in)	74 kg (163 lb)	8 July 1989	
9	Giulia Enrica Emmolo	D	1.71 m (5 ft 7 in)	66 kg (146 lb)	16 October 1991	
10	Giulia Rambaldi Guidasci	DF	1.78 m (5 ft 10 in)	77 kg (170 lb)	11 November 1986	
11	Aleksandra Cotti	D	1.66 m (5 ft 5 in)	64 kg (141 lb)	13 December 1988	
12	Teresa Frassinetti	CF	1.78 m (5 ft 10 in)	72 kg (159 lb)	24 December 1985	
13	Giulia Gorlero	GK	1.78 m (5 ft 10 in)	69 kg (152 lb)	26 September 1990	
14	Anikó Pelle	CB			28 September 1978	
15	Federica Radicchi	CB			21 December 1988	

Head coach: Fabio Conti

Group play

Team	Pld	W	D	L	GF	GA	GD	Pts
Australia	3	3	0	0	37	19	+18	6
Russia	3	2	0	1	22	21	+1	4
Italy	3	1	0	2	22	22	0	2
Great Britain	3	0	0	3	14	33	−19	0

30 July 2012; 15:30	Report	Italy	8–10	Australia	Water Polo Arena, London; Referees: Steven Rotsart (USA), Gyorgy Juhasz (HUN)
30 July 2012; 15:30	Report	Score by quarters: 1–2, 3–2, 0–4, 4–2			Water Polo Arena, London; Referees: Steven Rotsart (USA), Gyorgy Juhasz (HUN)
30 July 2012; 15:30	Report	Di Mario, Radicchi 2	Goals	Gynther 3	Water Polo Arena, London; Referees: Steven Rotsart (USA), Gyorgy Juhasz (HUN)

1 August 2012; 15:30	Report	Italy	4–7	Russia	Water Polo Arena, London; Referees: Sergi Sanchez (ESP), German Moller (ARG)
1 August 2012; 15:30	Report	Score by quarters: 0–1, 1–1, 1–4, 2–1			Water Polo Arena, London; Referees: Sergi Sanchez (ESP), German Moller (ARG)
1 August 2012; 15:30	Report	Di Mario 2	Goals	Lisunova 3	Water Polo Arena, London; Referees: Sergi Sanchez (ESP), German Moller (ARG)

3 August 2012; 18:20	Report	Great Britain	5–10	Italy	Water Polo Arena, London; Referees: German Moller (ARG), Kazuhiko Makita (JPN)
3 August 2012; 18:20	Report	Score by quarters: 2–4, 1–2, 1–2, 1–2			Water Polo Arena, London; Referees: German Moller (ARG), Kazuhiko Makita (JPN)
3 August 2012; 18:20	Report	Gibson-Byrne 2	Goals	Emmolo, Di Mario 3	Water Polo Arena, London; Referees: German Moller (ARG), Kazuhiko Makita (JPN)

Quarter-final

5 August 2012; 19:00	Report	United States	9–6	Italy	Water Polo Arena, London; Referees: Adrian Alexandrescu (ROU), Mihajlo Ćirić (SRB)
5 August 2012; 19:00	Report	Score by quarters: 3–3, 3–0, 0–1, 3–2			Water Polo Arena, London; Referees: Adrian Alexandrescu (ROU), Mihajlo Ćirić (SRB)
5 August 2012; 19:00	Report	Seidemann 3	Goals	Di Mario 3	Water Polo Arena, London; Referees: Adrian Alexandrescu (ROU), Mihajlo Ćirić (SRB)

5–8th place semifinals

7 August 2012; 14:10	Report	Italy	10–14	China	Water Polo Arena, London; Referees: Svetlana Dreval (RUS), Anton Bervoets (NED)
7 August 2012; 14:10	Report	Score by quarters: 2–5, 2–5, 2–2, 4–2			Water Polo Arena, London; Referees: Svetlana Dreval (RUS), Anton Bervoets (NED)
7 August 2012; 14:10	Report	Di Mario 4	Goals	six players 2	Water Polo Arena, London; Referees: Svetlana Dreval (RUS), Anton Bervoets (NED)

Seventh place game

9 August 2012; 14:30	Report	Italy	11–7	Great Britain	Water Polo Arena, London; Referees: Daniel Flahive (AUS), Gyorgy Juhasz (HUN)
9 August 2012; 14:30	Report	Score by quarters: 2–3, 4–0, 3–2, 2–2			Water Polo Arena, London; Referees: Daniel Flahive (AUS), Gyorgy Juhasz (HUN)
9 August 2012; 14:30	Report	Di Mario 4	Goals	McCann, Clayton 2	Water Polo Arena, London; Referees: Daniel Flahive (AUS), Gyorgy Juhasz (HUN)

== Weightlifting ==
Italy has qualified the following quota places.

Athlete	Event	Snatch		Clean & Jerk		Total	Rank
Athlete	Event	Result	Rank	Result	Rank	Total	Rank
Mirco Scarantino	Men's −56 kg	97	18	128	=13	225	14

== Wrestling ==
Italy has qualified 1 quota.

Key:

- VT – Victory by Fall.
- PP – Decision by Points – the loser with technical points.
- PO – Decision by Points – the loser without technical points.

Men's Greco-Roman

Athlete	Event	Qualification	Round of 16	Quarterfinal	Semifinal	Repechage 1	Repechage 2	Final / BM	
Athlete	Event	Opposition Result	Opposition Result	Opposition Result	Opposition Result	Opposition Result	Opposition Result	Opposition Result	Rank
Daigoro Timoncini	−96 kg	Bye	Aleksanyan (ARM); L 0–3 ^{PO}	Did not advance					17
