= Taekwondo at the 2012 Summer Olympics – Men's 80 kg =

Taekwondo competition

Men's 80kg at the Games of the XXX Olympiad
- Venue: ExCeL Exhibition Centre
- Date: 10 August
- Competitors: 16 from 16 nations

Medalists
| 1st place, gold medalist(s) | | Sebastián Crismanich | Argentina |
| 2nd place, silver medalist(s) | | Nicolás García | Spain |
| 3rd place, bronze medalist(s) | | Lutalo Muhammad | Great Britain |
| 3rd place, bronze medalist(s) | | Mauro Sarmiento | Italy |

The men's 80 kg competition at the 2012 Summer Olympics was held on 10 August, at the ExCeL Exhibition Centre.

== Competition format ==
The main bracket consisted of a single elimination tournament, culminating in the gold medal match. Two bronze medals were awarded at the Taekwondo competitions. A repechage was used to determine the bronze medal winners. Every competitor who lost to one of the two finalists competed in the repechage, another single-elimination competition. Each semifinal loser faced the last remaining repechage competitor from the opposite half of the bracket in a bronze medal match.

== Schedule ==
All times are British Summer Time (UTC+1)

| Date | Time | Round |
|---|---|---|
| Friday, 10 August 2012 | 09:15; 15:15; 17:17; 22:30 | Preliminary Round; Quarterfinals; Semifinals; Final |

== Results ==
On 13 July 2012, the World Taekwondo Federation released the provisional draw which included the top eight seeds for the competition. The remainder of the qualified athletes were randomly drawn on 6 August 2012.

=== Main bracket ===
Preliminary round
1 | Ramin Azizov (AZE) | 3
16 | Steven López (USA) | 2
12 | Rasul Abduraim (KGZ) | 1
8 | Mauro Sarmiento (ITA) | 5
5 | Nicolás García (ESP) | 8
11 | Yousef Karami (IRI) | 2
15 | Farkhod Negmatov (TJK) | 1
4 | Lutalo Muhammad (GBR) | 7
3 | Abdelrahman Ahmed (EGY) | 8
13 | Tommy Mollet (NED) | 9 (SUD)
10 | Arman Yeremyan (ARM) | 8
6 | Sébastien Michaud (CAN) | 4
7 | Sebastián Crismanich (ARG) | 9
14 | Vaughn Scott (NZL) | 5
9 | Nesar Ahmad Bahave (AFG) | 4
2 | Issam Chernoubi (MAR) | 3

Quarterfinals
1 | Ramin Azizov (AZE) | 1
8 | Mauro Sarmiento (ITA) | 2
5 | Nicolás García (ESP) | 7
4 | Lutalo Muhammad (GBR) | 3
Tommy Mollet (NED) | 4
Arman Yeremyan (ARM) | 6
7 | Sebastián Crismanich (ARG) | 9
Nesar Ahmad Bahave (AFG) | 1

Semifinals
8 | Mauro Sarmiento (ITA) | 1
5 | Nicolás García (ESP) | 2
Arman Yeremyan (ARM) | 1
7 | Sebastián Crismanich (ARG) | 2

Gold medal match
5 | Nicolás García (ESP) | 0
7 | Sebastián Crismanich (ARG) | 1

=== Repechage ===
Preliminary Round
Lutalo Muhammad (GBR) | 11
Yousef Karami (IRI) | 7
Vaughn Scott (NZL) | 6
Nesar Ahmad Bahave (AFG) | 11

Bronze Medal Contest
Arman Yeremyan (ARM) | 3
Lutalo Muhammad (GBR) | 9
Nesar Ahmad Bahave (AFG) | 0
Mauro Sarmiento (ITA) | 4
