= Arman Yeremyan =

Armenian taekwondo practitioner

Medal record

Men's taekwondo

Representing Armenia

European Championships
Gold medal – first place	2008 Rome	Welterweight
Silver medal – second place	2016 Montreux	Middleweight

Universiade
Bronze medal – third place	2005 Izmir	Welterweight
Bronze medal – third place	2007 Bangkok	Welterweight
Bronze medal – third place	2009 Belgrad	Welterweight

Youth European Championships
Silver medal – second place	2001 Pamplona	Welterweight
Bronze medal – third place	2003 Athens	Welterweight

Arman Yeremyan (Armenian: Արման Երեմյան; born 29 January 1986) is an Armenian taekwondo athlete. He is an Armenian and European Champion. Yeremyan has been awarded the Master of Sport of Armenia, International Class title.

== Biography ==
Arman Yeremyan was born on 29 January 1986 in Yerevan, Armenian SSR. He took up taekwondo under Arsen Avetisyan. He participated in and became the winner of junior international competitions. He won silver and bronze medals at the European Youth Championships in 2001 and 2003. Yeremyan won three bronze medals at the Universiade in 2005, 2007 and 2009. Yeremyan's most significant success was his gold medal victory at the 2008 European Taekwondo Championships in Rome, Italy in the men's welterweight (78 kg) division. He made history as the first Armenian taekwondoist to become a European Champion. In 2009, his son, Styopa Yeremyan, was born.

Yeremyan was the flag bearer for Armenia at the 2012 Summer Olympics and is the fifth Olympian to bear the flag of Armenia at the Summer Olympics. Albert Azaryan was originally intended to bear the Armenian flag at the 2012 Olympics, but the decision was changed due to his age and the honor was passed onto Yeremyan instead.

Yeremyan won a gold medal at the 2012 European Taekwondo Olympic Qualification Tournament in Kazan, Russia, qualifying him to compete at the 2012 Olympic Games in London. At the tournament, he defeated eventual 2012 Olympic silver medalist Nicolás García and Tommy Mollet. Yeremyan also became the first taekwondo practitioner from Armenia to compete at the Olympics.

In the first round of the 2012 Summer Olympics in the men's welterweight (80 kg) division, Yeremyan beat Canadian Sébastien Michaud, avenging an earlier loss to Michaud. Yeremyan defeated Dutchman Tommy Mollet once again in the quarterfinals. In the semifinals, Yeremyan narrowly lost by one point to Sebastián Crismanich of Argentina. Yeremyan previously defeated Crismanich in an earlier match. Crismanich went on to become the Olympic Champion. Yeremyan next lost the bronze medal match because of controversial scoring to Lutalo Muhammad of the host nation Great Britain in a fight where many of Yeremyan kicks weren't counted and many of Muhammad's shouldn't have been. Yeremyan, who scored a head kick in the final seconds that went uncounted, stood confused after the match was over. He came in fifth place.

He won a silver medal at the 2016 European Taekwondo Championships in Montreux, Switzerland in the men's middleweight (87 kg) division.
