= Kyrgyzstan at the 2012 Summer Olympics =

- IOC code: KGZ
- NOC: National Olympic Committee of the Republic of Kyrgyzstan

in London
- Competitors: 14 in 8 sports
- Flag bearers: Chingiz Mamedov (opening); Bekzat Osmonaliev (closing)
- Medals: Gold 0 Silver 0 Bronze 0 Total 0

Summer Olympics appearances (overview)
- 1996; 2000; 2004; 2008; 2012; 2016; 2020; 2024

Other related appearances
- Russian Empire (1900–1912); Soviet Union (1952–1988); Unified Team (1992)

Kyrgyzstan competed at the 2012 Summer Olympics in London, United Kingdom from 27 July 2012 to 12 August 2012. This was the nation's fifth appearance at the Olympics in the post-Soviet era.

The National Olympic Committee of the Republic of Kyrgyzstan sent the nation's smallest delegation to the Games. A total of 14 athletes, 11 men and 3 women, competed in 8 sports, including the nation's Olympic debut in sailing. This was also Kyrgyzstan's youngest delegation in Summer Olympic history, with more than half under the age of 25, and many of them were expected to reach their peak in time for the 2016 Summer Olympics in Rio de Janeiro. Judoka Chingiz Mamedov was the nation's flag bearer at the opening ceremony.

For the third time in history, Kyrgyzstan, however, failed to win a single Olympic medal in London.

== Competitors ==
The following is the list of number of competitors participating in the Games and selected biographies.

Sport	Men	Women	Total
Athletics	1	1	2
Judo	2	0	2
Sailing	1	0	1
Shooting	1	0	1
Swimming	1	1	2
Taekwondo	1	0	1
Weightlifting	1	0	1
Wrestling	3	1	4
Total	11	3	14

== Athletics ==
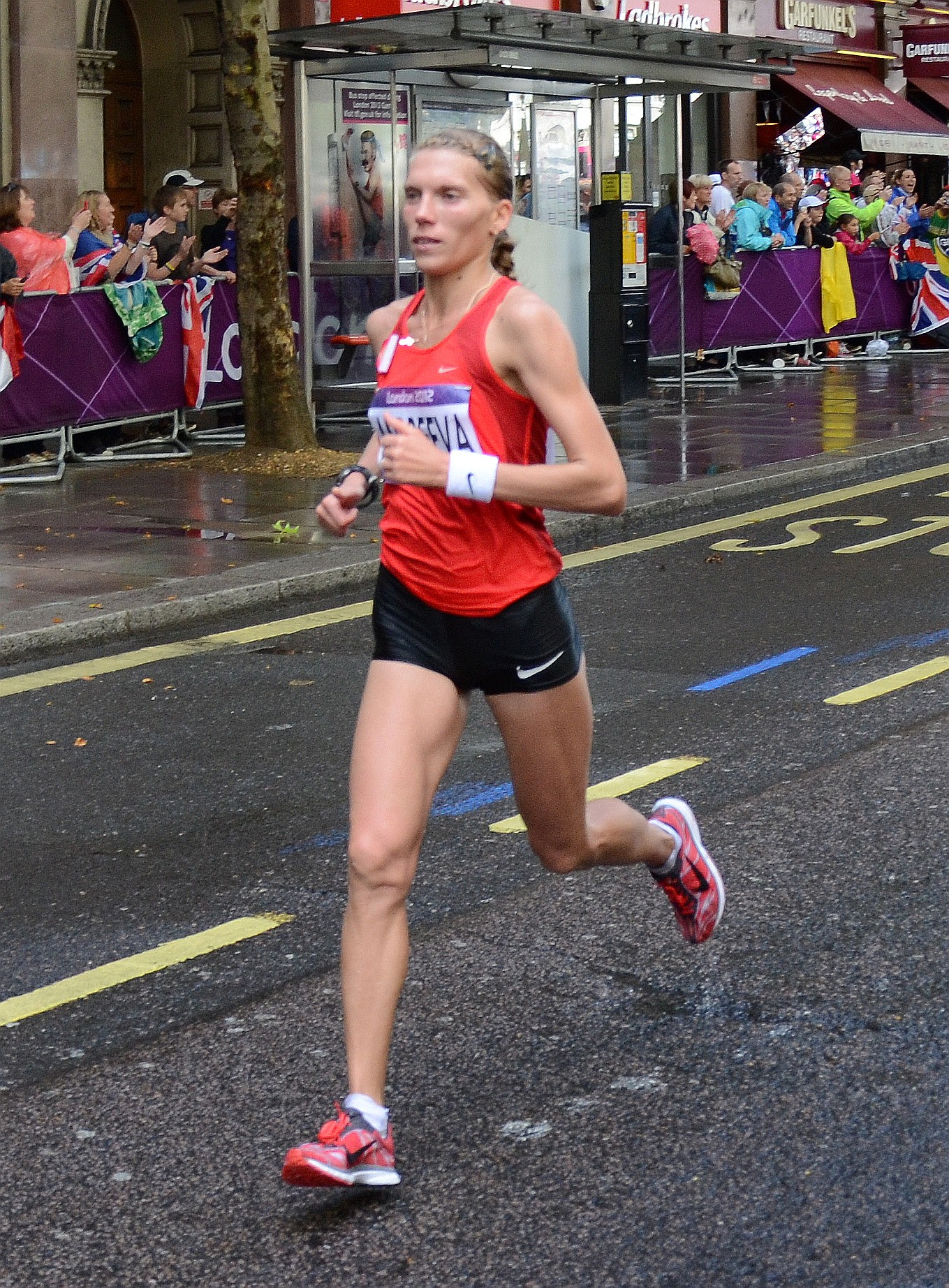
Iuliia Andreeva finished sixtieth in women's marathon.

Kyrgyz athletes have so far achieved qualifying standards in the following athletics events (up to a maximum of 3 athletes in each event at the 'A' Standard, and 1 at the 'B' Standard):

Key
- Note–Ranks given for track events are within the athlete's heat only
- Q = Qualified for the next round
- q = Qualified for the next round as a fastest loser or, in field events, by position without achieving the qualifying target
- NR = National record
- N/A = Round not applicable for the event
- Bye = Athlete not required to compete in round

Men

Athlete	Event	Heat		Semifinal		Final	
Athlete	Event	Result	Rank	Result	Rank	Result	Rank
Erzhan Askarov	800 m	1:59.56	8	Did not advance			

Women

Athlete	Event	Final	
Athlete	Event	Result	Rank
Iuliia Andreeva	Marathon	2:36:01	60

== Judo ==
Men

Athlete	Event	Round of 32	Round of 16	Quarterfinals	Semifinals	Repechage	Final / BM	
Athlete	Event	Opposition Result	Opposition Result	Opposition Result	Opposition Result	Opposition Result	Opposition Result	Rank
Chingiz Mamedov	Men's −90 kg	Nishiyama (JPN); L 0000–0110	Did not advance					
Iurii Krakovetskii	Men's +100 kg	Simionescu (ROU); L 0001–1001	Did not advance					

== Sailing ==
Kyrgyzstan has qualified 1 boat for each of the following events

Men

Athlete	Event	Race											Net points	Final rank
Athlete	Event	1	2	3	4	5	6	7	8	9	10	M*	Net points	Final rank
Ilya Ignatiev	Laser	~~49~~	49	49	48	48	48	38	47	46	~~49~~	EL	422	49

M = Medal race; EL = Eliminated – did not advance into the medal race;

== Shooting ==
Kyrgyzstan has ensured berths in the following events of shooting

Men

Athlete	Event	Qualification		Final	
Athlete	Event	Points	Rank	Points	Rank
Ruslan Ismailov	10 m air rifle	593	21	Did not advance	
Ruslan Ismailov	50 m rifle 3 positions	1146	40	Did not advance	

== Swimming ==
Kyrgyzstan has gained two "Universality places" from the FINA.

Men

Athlete	Event	Heat		Semifinal		Final	
Athlete	Event	Time	Rank	Time	Rank	Time	Rank
Dmitrii Aleksandrov	200 m breaststroke	2:17.92	32	Did not advance			

Women

Athlete	Event	Heat		Semifinal		Final	
Athlete	Event	Time	Rank	Time	Rank	Time	Rank
Dariya Talanova	200 m breaststroke	2:38.01	34	Did not advance			

== Taekwondo ==
Kyrgyzstan has qualified in the following events.

Athlete	Event	Round of 16	Quarterfinals	Semifinals	Repechage	Bronze Medal	Final	
Athlete	Event	Opposition Result	Opposition Result	Opposition Result	Opposition Result	Opposition Result	Opposition Result	Rank
Rasul Abduraim	Men's −80 kg	Sarmiento (ITA); L 1–5	Did not advance					

== Weightlifting ==
Kyrgyzstan has qualified the following quota places.

Athlete	Event	Snatch		Clean & Jerk		Total	Rank
Athlete	Event	Result	Rank	Result	Rank	Total	Rank
Bekzat Osmonaliev	Men's −56 kg	127	3	~~147~~	DNF	127	DNF

== Wrestling ==
Kyrgyzstan has qualified in the following weight categories.

Key:
- VT – Victory by Fall.
- PP – Decision by Points – the loser with technical points.
- PO – Decision by Points – the loser without technical points.

Men's freestyle

Athlete	Event	Qualification	Round of 16	Quarterfinal	Semifinal	Repechage 1	Repechage 2	Final / BM	
Athlete	Event	Opposition Result	Opposition Result	Opposition Result	Opposition Result	Opposition Result	Opposition Result	Opposition Result	Rank
Magomed Musaev	−96 kg	Balcı (TUR); W 3–1 ^{PP}	Isokawa (JPN); W 3–1 ^{PP}	Yazdani (IRI); L 1–3 ^{PP}	Did not advance				7

Men's Greco-Roman

Athlete	Event	Qualification	Round of 16	Quarterfinal	Semifinal	Repechage 1	Repechage 2	Final / BM	
Athlete	Event	Opposition Result	Opposition Result	Opposition Result	Opposition Result	Opposition Result	Opposition Result	Opposition Result	Rank
Arsen Eraliev	−55 kg	Bye	Sourian (IRI); L 1–3 ^{PP}	Did not advance		Bye	Modos (HUN); L 0–3 ^{PO}	Did not advance	11
Daniar Kobonov	−74 kg	Bye	Julfalakyan (ARM); L 0–3 ^{PO}	Did not advance		Bye	Kikiniou (BLR); L 0–3 ^{PO}	Did not advance	17

Women's freestyle

Athlete	Event	Qualification	Round of 16	Quarterfinal	Semifinal	Repechage 1	Repechage 2	Final / BM	
Athlete	Event	Opposition Result	Opposition Result	Opposition Result	Opposition Result	Opposition Result	Opposition Result	Opposition Result	Rank
Aisuluu Tynybekova	−63 kg	Bye	Johansson (SWE); L 0–3 ^{PO}	Did not advance					13
