= Vaughn Scott =

New Zealand Taekwondo martial artist

Personal information
- Born: 11 January 1990 (age 36)
- Height: 1.85 m (6 ft 1 in)

Sport
- Country: New Zealand
- Sport: Taekwondo
- Event: Men's -80 kg
- Coached by: Jin Kuen Oh
Medal record
Pacific Games
Silver medal – second place	2015 Port Moresby	-80 kg

Vaughn Scott (born 11 January 1990, Cape Town) is a male Taekwondo fighter who represented New Zealand at the 2012 Summer Olympics in London in the Men's 80 kg weight class. He lost his first round fight to Argentine Sebastián Crismanich by a score of 9–5. Because Crismanich went on to win the gold medal, Scott was included in the repechage and lost his fight to Afghan Nesar Ahmad Bahave by a score of 11–6, and was eliminated from the Olympic tournament.

In competition to qualify for the 2016 Olympics, Scott lost to Hayder Shkara, the same fighter he defeated to qualify for the 2012 games.
