= Ángel Román =

Puerto Rican taekwondo practitioner

Personal information
- Full name: Ángel Román Martínez
- Nationality: Puerto Rico
- Born: 11 July 1984 (age 41) San Juan, Puerto Rico
- Height: 1.92 m (6 ft 3 1/2 in)
- Weight: 80 kg (176 lb)

Sport
- Sport: Taekwondo
- Event: 80 kg

Ángel Román Martínez (Note: In this Spanish name, the first or paternal surname is Román and the second or maternal family name is Martínez.) (born July 11, 1984) is a Puerto Rican taekwondo practitioner and mathematician who is a Postdoctoral Lecturer at Washington University in St. Louis. Roman represented Puerto Rico at the 2008 Summer Olympics in Beijing, where he competed for the men's 80 kg class. He lost the first preliminary match to Canada's Sébastien Michaud, with a sudden death score of 1–2.
