= Farzad Abdollahi =

Iranian taekwondo practitioner (born 1990)

Medal record

Men's taekwondo

Representing Iran

World Championships
Gold medal – first place	2011 Gyeongju	80 kg

Asian Games
Bronze medal – third place	2010 Guangzhou	80 kg

Asian Championships
Gold medal – first place	2008 Luoyang	78 kg
Gold medal – first place	2010 Astana	74 kg

World Combat Games
Gold medal – first place	2013 St. Petersburg	Team

Farzad Abdollahi (Persian: فرزاد عبداللهی, born 27 October 1990 in Mianeh, Iran) is an Iranian taekwondo practitioner. He won the gold medal in the welterweight division (80 kg) at the 2011 World Taekwondo Championships in Gyeongju, South Korea.

Abdollahi is a cousin of another world taekwondo champion, Yousef Karami.
