= Issam Chernoubi =

Moroccan taekwondo practitioner

Personal information
- Born: 17 December 1987 (age 38) Tabriquet, Salé, Morocco
Medal record
Men's taekwondo
Representing Morocco
Mediterranean Games
Gold medal – first place	2013 Mersin	-80 kg

Issam Chernoubi (born 17 December 1987 in Salé) is a Moroccan taekwondo practitioner. He competed in the 80 kg event at the 2012 Summer Olympics and was eliminated in the preliminary round by Nesar Ahmad Bahave.
