= Yunus Sarı =

Turkish taekwondo practitioner (born 1991)

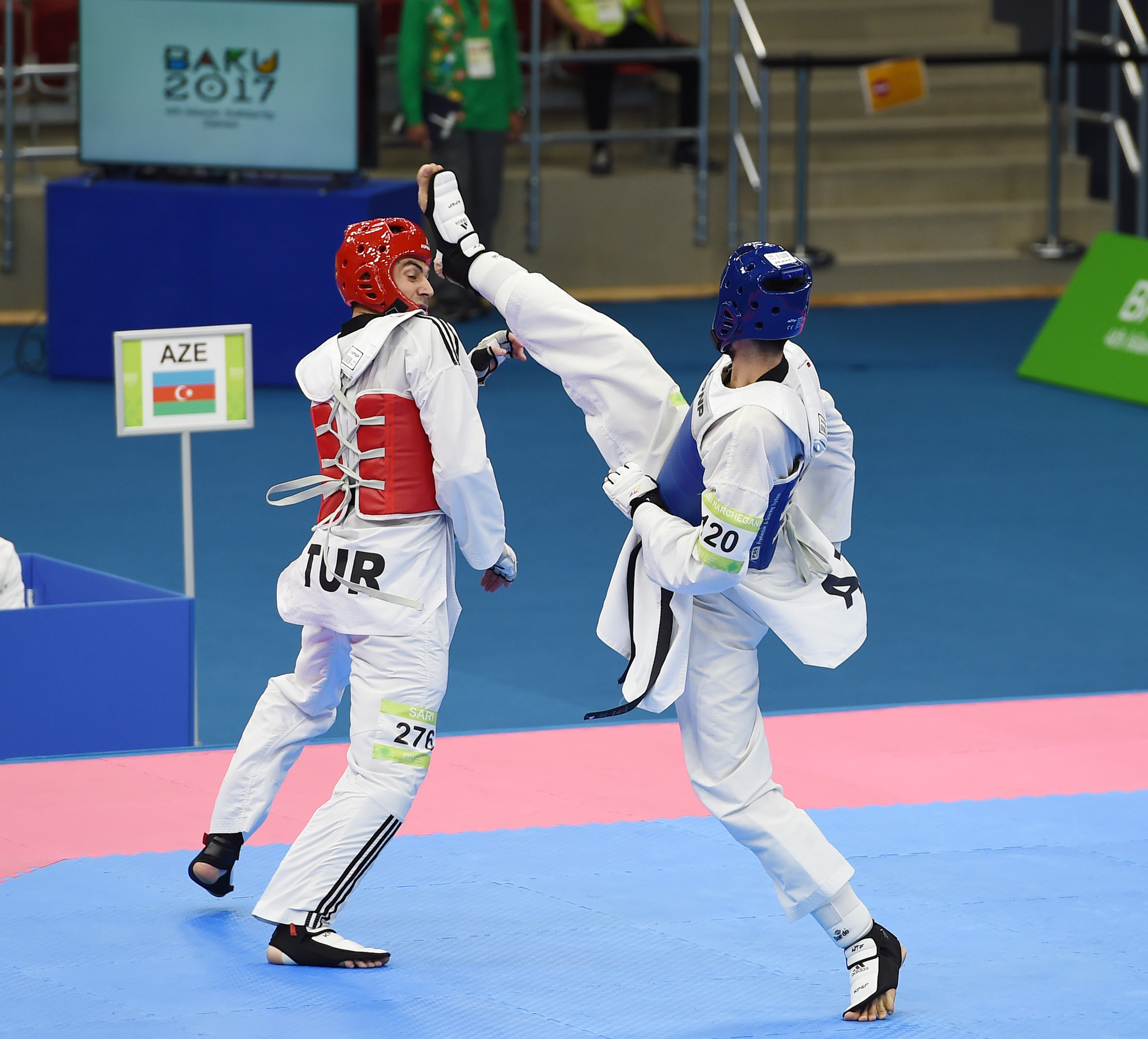
- Yunus Sarı (red) at the 2017 Islamic Solidarity Games

Personal information
- Nationality: Turkish
- Born: January 21, 1991 (age 35) Beyşehir, Turkey
- Height: 1.88 m (6 ft 2 in)
- Weight: 80 kg (176 lb)

Sport
- Country: Turkey
- Sport: Taekwondo
- Event: Welterweight
- Club: Ulaştırmaspor K.
Medal record
World Championships
Silver medal – second place	2011 Gyeongju	Welterweight
European Championships
Silver medal – second place	2005 Palermo	Cadet Bantamweight
Silver medal – second place	2007 Baku	Junior Bantamweight
Gold medal – first place	2013 Athens	Club Welterweight
Silver medal – second place	2016 Montreux	Welterweight
Mediterranean Games
Bronze medal – third place	2018 Tarragona	Middleweight
Bronze medal – third place	2013 Mersin	Welterweight
Universiade
Silver medal – second place	2011 Shenzhen	Welterweight
World University Championships
Gold medal – first place	2012 Poncheon	Welterweight
Bronze medal – third place	2010 Vigo	Welterweight

Yunus Sarı (born January 21, 1991) is a Turkish taekwondo practitioner competing in the welterweight division. He is a member of Ulaştırmaspor, a club of the Ministry of Transport.Athlete is student of physical education and sports at Selçuk University in Konya. His two brothers Ali and Talha are also successful taekwondo practitioners.

He won the silver medal in the welterweight division at the 2011 World Taekwondo Championships held in Gyeongju, South Korea. At the 2013 Mediterranean Games held in Mersin, Turkey, he won the bronze medal in the 80 kg event.

== Medals records ==
- 2005 European Cadets Taekwondo Championships in Palermo, Italy - Silver
- 2007 Black Sea Games in Trabzon, Turkey - 1 Gold
- 2007 European Junior Taekwondo Championships in Baku, Azerbaijan - Silver
- 2010 World University Taekwondo Championships in Vigo, Spain - Bronze
- 2010 World Taekwondo Championships for Teams in Urumqi, China - Bronze
- 2011 Summer Universiade in Shenzhen, China - 2 Silver
- 2011 World Taekwondo Championships in Gyeongju, South Korea. - Silver
- 2012 World University Taekwondo Championships in Poncheon, South Korea - Gold
- 2013 European Clubs Taekwondo Championships in Athens, Greece. - Gold
- 2016 European Taekwondo Championships in Montreux, Switzerland - Silver
