= Sebastián Crismanich =

Argentine Olympic taekwondo athlete

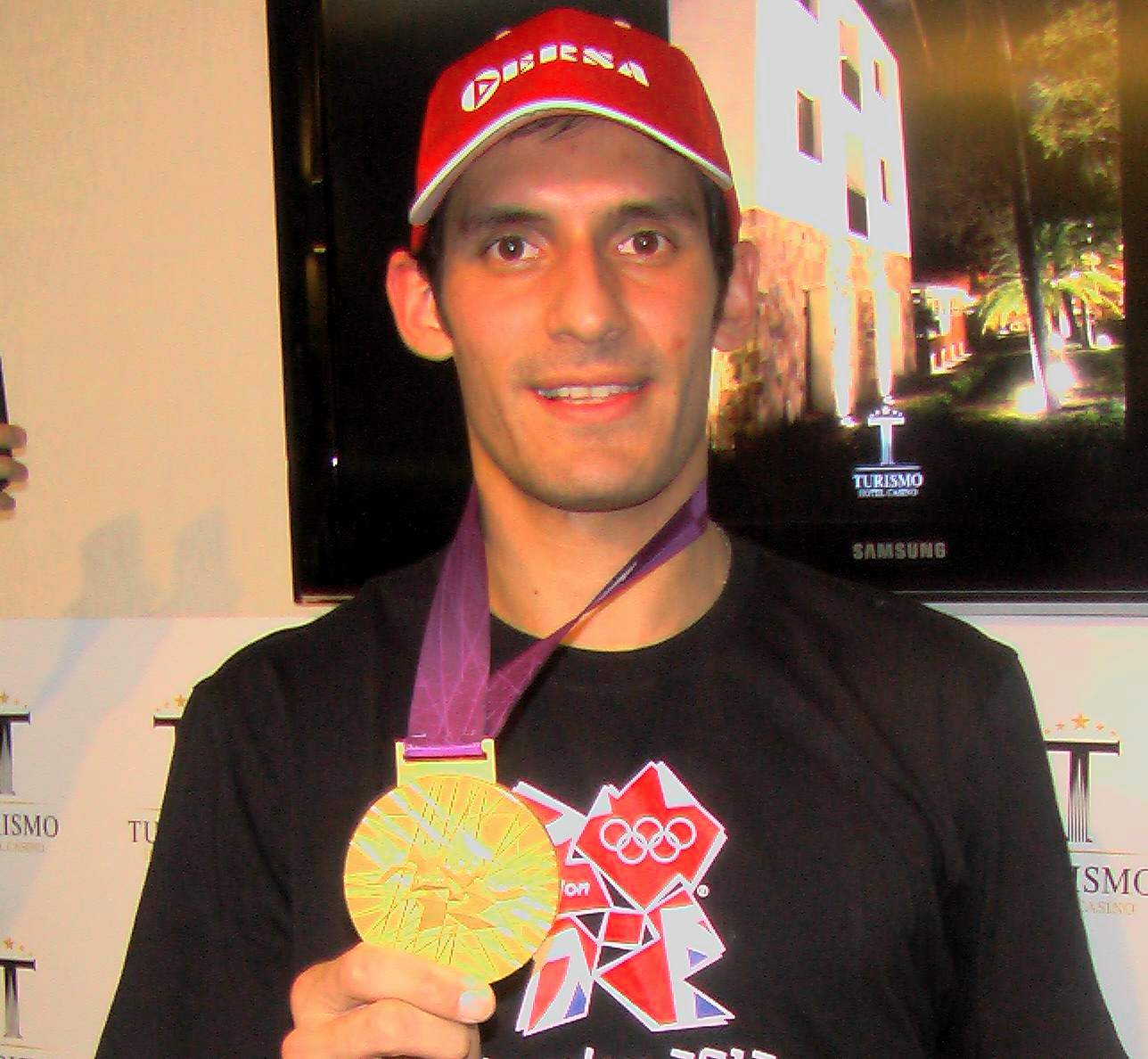

Personal information
- Born: 30 October 1986 (age 39) Corrientes, Argentina

Sport
- Sport: Taekwondo
Medal record
Representing Argentina
Olympic Games
Gold medal – first place	2012 London	80 kg
Pan American Games
Gold medal – first place	2011 Guadalajara	80 kg

Sebastián Eduardo Crismanich (born 30 October 1986) is an Argentine taekwondo athlete. He won the gold medal in the men's 80 kg division at the 2012 Summer Olympics.

Sebastián has the distinction of being the second individual athlete to win a gold medal for Argentina, the inaugural taekwondo medal for Argentina. The gold medal honor was established at the 1948 Summer Olympics, when Delfo Cabrera entered the stadium concluding the marathon.

In his quest for the gold medal, Crismanich beat New Zealander Vaughn Scott 9–5, and then Afghan Nesar Ahmad Bahawi 9–1 in the quarterfinals.

After a fierce battle in the semifinals, Crismanich defeated Armenian Arman Yeremyan 2-1 and proceeded to the Olympic final.

In a narrow victory against Spaniard Nicolas Garcia Hemme, Crismanich was only able to take the advantage needed to win in the final round, seconds from the end.

He was honored as the national flag bearer at the London 2012 Summer Olympics Closing Ceremony Parade of Flags.

== Biography ==
Sebastián Crismanich was born in Corrientes, Corrientes Province, into a Croatian immigrant family (Croatian: Krizmanić). His brother, Mauro, is also a well-known taekwondo practitioner who won the bronze medal in men's flyweight (under 58 kg) at the 2009 World Taekwondo Championships in Copenhagen.
