= Abdelrahman Ossama =

Egyptian taekwondo practitioner

Abdelrahman Ossama Ahmed (born 7 October 1988 in Cairo) is an Egyptian taekwondo practitioner. He competed in the 80 kg event at the 2012 Summer Olympics and was eliminated in the preliminary round by Tommy Mollet.

== Achievements ==
- 1st Place in Frankfon World Cup 2007
- 1st Place in Arab championship in Sharm El Sheikh (-80 kg) 2007
- 5th Place in World Championship in China (-78 kg) 2007
- 1st Place in African Games in Algeria (-78 kg) 2007
- 1st Place in Arab Games in Egypt (-78 kg) 2007
- 6th Place in World Taekwondo Qualification for the Beijing Olympic Games Manchester 2007 (-80 kg)
- 4th Place in the World University Championship in Serbia (-84 kg) 2008
- 2nd Place in Beijing Olympic Games (Test Event) (-80 kg) 2008
- 1st Place in Arab Championship in Bahrain (-78 kg) 2009
- 1st Place in Alexandria of the World Championships (-84 kg) 2009
- 1st Place in Arab championship in Sharm El Sheikh (-80 kg) 2010
- 2nd Place in African Championship in Libya (-80 kg) 2010
- Participate in World Championship in Korea (-80 kg) 2011
- 5th Place in World Qualification for London Olympic Games in Baku (-80 kg) 2011
- 1st Place in Egypt open Championship (-80 kg) 2011
- 1st Place in African Games in Mozambique (-80 kg) 2011
- 3rd Place in World University Championship in Korea (-80 kg) 2012
- 2nd Place in Africa Qualification for London Olympic Games in Egypt (-80 kg) 2012
