= Tommy Mollet =

Dutch taekwondo practitioner

Tommy Mollet (born 29 March 1979 in Tilburg) is a Dutch taekwondo practitioner. He competed in the 80 kg event at the 2012 Summer Olympics; after defeating Abdelrahman Ahmed in the preliminary round, he was eliminated by Arman Yeremyan in the quarterfinal.
