= Ramin Azizov =

Azerbaijani taekwondo practitioner

- Azizov in 2012

Medal record

Men's taekwondo

Representing Azerbaijan

World Championships
Bronze medal – third place	2011 Gyeongju	Welterweight

European Championships
Silver medal – second place	2012 Manchester	Welterweight
Bronze medal – third place	2014 Baku	Welterweight

Islamic Solidarity Games
Gold medal – first place	2017 Baku	Welterweight

Ramin Azizov (born 8 February 1988 in Lankaran) is an Azerbaijani taekwondo practitioner. He received a gold medal at the 2011 World Taekwondo Olympic Qualification Tournament, held in his home country, and qualified for the 2012 Summer Olympics in the -80 kg division. At the 2012 Summer Olympics he won his first match against Steven López, before losing to Mauro Sarmiento in the quarterfinals.
