= Rasul Abduraim =

Kyrgyzstani taekwondo practitioner

Personal information
- Nationality: Kyrgyzstani
- Born: 12 December 1988 (age 37) Panfilov District, Kyrgyzstan

Sport
- Sport: Taekwondo
- Weight class: Featherweight (2008), Welterweight (2012)

Achievements and titles
- Olympic finals: 2008 Summer Olympics – Men's Featherweight; 2012 Summer Olympics – Men's 80 kg

Rasul Abduraim (born 12 December 1988 in Panfilov District, Kyrgyzstan) is a Kyrgyzstani taekwondo practitioner. At the 2008 Olympics, he competed in the men's featherweight competition but was knocked out by Daniel Manz. He competed in the 80 kg event at the 2012 Summer Olympics and was eliminated in the preliminary round by Mauro Sarmiento. He is a Kyrgyzstani Uyghur.
