= Sébastien Michaud =

Canadian taekwondo practitioner

Personal information
- Born: May 7, 1987 (age 39) Joliette, Quebec, Canada
- Height: 1.85 m (6 ft 1 in)
- Weight: 78 kg (172 lb)

Sport
- Sport: Taekwondo
Medal record
Representing Canada
Men's taekwondo
World Championships
Bronze medal – third place	2007 Beijing	Welterweight
Bronze medal – third place	2009 Copenhagen	Welterweight
Pan American Championships
Gold medal – first place	2006 Buenos Aires	Welterweight

Sébastien Michaud (born May 7, 1987) started in taekwondo at the age of five, following in his father's and brothers footsteps. Born in Joliette, Quebec, he currently resides in Quebec City, Quebec where he studies software engineering at Université Laval. On April 10, 2012, he was nominated as president of the Association des Étudiants en Génie Logiciel of Université Laval.

== Career ==
Sébastien was part of the three member Canadian Olympic team at the 2008 Summer Olympic Games in Taekwondo along with Ivett Gonda & Karine Sergerie. He again represented Canada at the 2012 Summer Olympics.

=== Career highlights ===
- 2007 World Olympic Qualification Tournament: 1st Place
- 2007 World Taekwondo Championships: Bronze
- 2007 Canadian Senior National Championships: Gold
- 2006 Pan American Championships: Gold
- 2006 Canadian Senior National Championships: Gold
