= Mauro Sarmiento =

Italian taekwondo practitioner

Personal information
- Born: August 10, 1983 (age 42) Casoria, Italy
Medal record
Representing Italy
Men's taekwondo
Olympic Games
Silver medal – second place	2008 Beijing	80 kg
Bronze medal – third place	2012 London	80 kg
European Championships
Bronze medal – third place	2008 Rome	Middleweight
Universiade
Silver medal – second place	2005 Izmir	Middleweight
Bronze medal – third place	2007 Bangkok	Middleweight

Mauro Sarmiento (born August 10, 1983) is an Italian martial artist. He was born in Casoria, Italy, and represented Italy in Taekwondo at the 2008 Summer Olympics – Men's 80 kg, and won the silver medal, upsetting two-time Olympic champion Steven López of the United States in the quarterfinals. In the gold medal round he lost to Hadi Saei.

At the 2012 Summer Olympics, he won the bronze medal in the men's -80 kg taekwondo event, losing to Nicolas Garcia in the semi-finals, and then beating Nesar Ahmad Bahawi in his bronze medal match.
