= Nesar Ahmad Bahave =

Afghan taekwondo practitioner

Personal information
- Nationality: Afghan
- Born: March 27, 1984 (age 42)
- Height: 184 cm (6 ft 0 in)

Sport
- Country: Afghanistan
- Sport: Taekwondo
- Event: Men's -80kg
Medal record
Men's taekwondo
Representing Afghanistan
World Championships
Silver medal – second place	2007 Beijing	Lightweight
Asian Games
Silver medal – second place	2010 Guangzhou	Welterweight
Bronze medal – third place	2006 Doha	Lightweight

Nesar Ahmad Bahawi (Persian: نثار احمد بهاوی), born March 27, 1984, in Kapisa Province) is an Afghan Taekwondo practitioner. He won the silver medal in the lightweight category (72 kg) at the 2007 World Taekwondo Championships, edging out 2004 Olympic Champion Hadi Saei in the semifinals.

Nesar won the bronze medal in the lightweight category at the 2006 Asian Games, and represented Afghanistan in the -68kg category at the Beijing Olympics, where he also acted as flagbearer in the opening ceremony. Nesar won the gold medal in the 2009 Asian Martial Arts Games for taekwondo in the 72 kg weight range category. In 2010, he won the silver medal in the men's under 80 kg category at the 2010 Asian Games.

Nesar acted as flagbearer for Afghanistan again at the 2012 London Olympics, where he competed in the -80 kg category. On August 10, while suffering from a leg injury, he advanced from the preliminaries to the quarterfinals where he was defeated by Sebastián Crismanich of Argentina. As Sebastián advanced to the gold medal match, Nesar advanced to the bronze medal match, where he lost 0–4 against Mauro Sarmiento of Italy.
