= Nicolás García (taekwondo) =

Spanish taekwondo practitioner

Personal information
- Born: 20 June 1988 (age 38) Las Palmas, Canary Islands
Medal record
Men's taekwondo
Representing Spain
Olympic Games
Silver medal – second place	2012 London	80 kg
World Championships
Silver medal – second place	2009 Copenhagen	Welterweight
Bronze medal – third place	2013 Puebla	Welterweight
European Championships
Silver medal – second place	2008 Rome	Welterweight
Bronze medal – third place	2012 Manchester	Welterweight

Nicolás García Hemme (born 20 June 1988 in Las Palmas, Canary Islands) is a Spanish taekwondo athlete.

He won the silver medal in the men's welterweight (80 kg) division at the 2009 World Taekwondo Championships in Copenhagen. Three years later, he won the silver medal in men's welterweight (80 kg) division at the 2012 Summer Olympics in London.

== See also ==
- List of Olympic medalists in taekwondo
