= Taekwondo at the 2008 Summer Olympics – Qualification =

Taekwondo competitions at the 2008 Summer Olympics in Beijing were held from August 20 to August 23. The tournament was held at the Beijing Science and Technology University Gymnasium. There were four weight categories for both men and women. Each NOC can enter 2 men and 2 women, but only 1 athlete per weight category. There was one global Olympic Qualification Tournament and one qualification tournament for each continent. In addition, 4 invitational places were awarded.

== Timeline ==
Event	Date	Venue
World Qualification Tournament	September 28–30, 2007	Manchester, United Kingdom
African Qualification Tournament	November 1–2, 2007	Tripoli, Libya
Asian Qualification Tournament	November 28–30, 2007	Ho Chi Minh City, Vietnam
Oceania Qualification Tournament	December 1, 2007	Nouméa, New Caledonia
Pan American Qualification Tournament	December 8–9, 2007	Cali, Colombia
European Qualification Tournament	January 26–27, 2008	Istanbul, Turkey

== Qualification summary ==
NOC	Men				Women				Total
NOC	−58 kg	−68 kg	−80 kg	+80 kg	−49 kg	−57 kg	−67 kg	+67 kg	Total
Afghanistan	X	X							2
Argentina							X		1
Australia	X	X					X	X	4
Azerbaijan			X						1
Belize	X								1
Benin	X								1
Brazil	X					X		X	3
Canada			X		X		X		3
China			X	X	X			X	4
Chinese Taipei	X	X			X	X			4
Colombia					X	X			2
Costa Rica				X					1
Croatia						X	X		2
Cuba		X		X	X				3
Dominican Republic	X								1
Ecuador								X	1
Egypt								X	1
France				X			X		2
Gabon			X						1
Germany	X	X			X		X		4
Great Britain	X		X					X	3
Greece				X			X	X	3
Guinea							X		1
Honduras			X						1
Iran	X		X		X				3
Israel						X			1
Italy			X	X		X			3
Ivory Coast			X			X			2
Japan							X		1
Jordan								X	1
Kazakhstan				X			X		2
Kenya	X				X				2
Kyrgyzstan		X							1
Libya		X							1
Malaysia						X		X	2
Mali				X					1
Marshall Islands			X						1
Mexico	X	X						X	3
Morocco				X	X		X		3
Nepal			X						1
Netherlands		X							1
New Zealand		X		X		X			3
Niger						X			1
Nigeria		X		X					2
Norway								X	1
Papua New Guinea					X				1
Peru		X							1
Philippines	X						X		2
Portugal	X								1
Puerto Rico			X				X		2
Qatar			X						1
Senegal						X			1
South Korea		X		X		X	X		4
Spain	X			X				X	3
Sweden					X			X	2
Switzerland					X				1
Thailand	X				X	X			3
Tunisia								X	1
Turkey		X	X			X	X		4
United Arab Emirates							X		1
United States		X	X		X	X			4
Uzbekistan		X		X				X	3
Venezuela			X	X	X			X	4
Vietnam				X	X	X			3
Total: 64 NOCs	16	16	16	16	16	16	16	16	128

== Men's events ==
=== −58 kg ===
Competition	Places	Qualified athletes
World Qualification Tournament	3	Chu Mu-yen (TPE); Levent Tuncat (GER); Tshomlee Go (PHI)
African Qualification Tournament	2	Dickson Wamwiri (KEN); Jean Moloise Ogoudjobi (BEN)
Asian Qualification Tournament	3	Behzad Khodadad (IRI); Rohullah Nikpai (AFG); Dech Sutthikunkarn (THA)
Oceania Qualification Tournament	1	Ryan Carneli (AUS)
Pan American Qualification Tournament	3	Márcio Wenceslau (BRA); Guillermo Perez (MEX); Gabriel Mercedes (DOM)
European Qualification Tournament	3	Pedro Póvoa (POR); Tyrone Robinson (GBR); Juan Antonio Ramos (ESP)
Host nation / Universality places	1	Alfonso Martinez (BIZ)
Total	16	

=== −68 kg ===
Competition	Places	Qualified athletes
World Qualification Tournament	3	Son Tae-jin (KOR); Gessler Viera (CUB); Burak Hasan (AUS)
African Qualification Tournament	2	Ezedin Belgasem (LBA); Isah Mohammad (NGR)
Asian Qualification Tournament	3	Rasul Abduraim (KGZ); Dmitriy Kim (UZB); Sung Yu-chi (TPE)
Oceania Qualification Tournament	1	Logan Campbell (NZL)
Pan American Qualification Tournament	3	Peter López (PER); Mark López (USA); Idulio Islas (MEX)
European Qualification Tournament	3	Servet Tazegül (TUR); Daniel Manz (GER); Dennis Bekkers (NED)
Host nation / Universality places	1	Nesar Ahmad Bahave (AFG)
Total	16	

=== −80 kg ===
Competition	Places	Qualified athletes
World Qualification Tournament	3	Sébastien Michaud (CAN); Steven López (USA); Mauro Sarmiento (ITA)
African Qualification Tournament	2	Sebastien Konan (CIV); Lionel Baguissi (GAB)
Asian Qualification Tournament	3	Hadi Saei (IRI); Abdulqader Hikmat (QAT); Deepak Bista (NEP)
Oceania Qualification Tournament	1	Anju Jason (MHL)
Pan American Qualification Tournament	3	Juan Sánchez (PUR); Miguel Ferrera (HON); Carlos Vásquez (VEN)
European Qualification Tournament	3	Bahri Tanrıkulu (TUR); Rashad Ahmadov (AZE); Aaron Cook (GBR)
Host nation / Universality places	1	Zhu Guo (CHN)
Total	16	

=== +80 kg ===
Competition	Places	Qualified athletes
World Qualification Tournament	3	Mickaël Borot (FRA); Daba Modibo Keïta (MLI); Cha Dong-min (KOR)
African Qualification Tournament	2	Abdelkader Zrouri (MAR); Chika Chukwumerije (NGR)
Asian Qualification Tournament	3	Arman Chilmanov (KAZ); Nguyễn Văn Hùng (VIE); Akmal Irgashev (UZB)
Oceania Qualification Tournament	1	Matthew Beach (NZL)
Pan American Qualification Tournament	3	Ángel Matos (CUB); Kristopher Moitland (CRC); Juan Díaz (VEN)
European Qualification Tournament	3	Jon García (ESP); Leonardo Basile (ITA); Alexandros Nikolaidis (GRE)
Host nation / Universality places	1	Liu Xiaobo (CHN)
Total	16	

== Women's events ==
=== −49 kg ===
Competition	Places	Qualified athletes
World Qualification Tournament	3	Yang Shu-chun (TPE); Daynellis Montejo (CUB); Ivett Gonda (CAN)
African Qualification Tournament	2	Mildred Alango (KEN); Ghizlane Toudali (MAR)
Asian Qualification Tournament	3	Hoàng Hà Giang (VIE); Maenum Chirdkiatisak (THA); Sara Khoshjamal Fekri (IRI)
Oceania Qualification Tournament	1	Theresa Tona (PNG)
Pan American Qualification Tournament	3	Gladys Mora (COL); Dalia Contreras (VEN); Charlotte Craig (USA)
European Qualification Tournament	3	Hanna Zajc (SWE); Manuela Bezzola (SUI); Sümeyye Güleç (GER)
Host nation / Universality places	1	Wu Jingyu (CHN)
Total	16	

=== −57 kg ===
Competition	Places	Qualified athletes
World Qualification Tournament	3	Lim Su-jeong (KOR); Veronica Calabrese (ITA); Chonnapas Premwaew (THA)
African Qualification Tournament	2	Mariam Bah (CIV); Bineta Diédhiou (SEN)
Asian Qualification Tournament	3	Tseng Pei-hua (TPE); Nguyễn Thị Hoài Thu (VIE); Elaine Teo (MAS)
Oceania Qualification Tournament	1	Robin Cheong (NZL)
Pan American Qualification Tournament	3	Débora Nunes (BRA); Diana López (USA); Doris Patiño (COL)
European Qualification Tournament	3	Martina Zubčić (CRO); Azize Tanrıkulu (TUR); Bat-El Gatterer (ISR)
Host nation / Universality places	1	Lailatou Amadou Lele (NIG)
Total	16	

=== −67 kg ===
Competition	Places	Qualified athletes
World Qualification Tournament	3	Gwladys Épangue (FRA); Hwang Kyung-seon (KOR); Sandra Šarić (CRO)
African Qualification Tournament	2	Mouna Benabderrassoul (MAR); Mariama Dalanda Barry (GUI)
Asian Qualification Tournament	3	Liya Nurkina (KAZ); Toni Rivero (PHI); Yoriko Okamoto (JPN)
Oceania Qualification Tournament	1	Tina Morgan (AUS)
Pan American Qualification Tournament	3	Vanina Sánchez (ARG); Karine Sergerie (CAN); Asunción Ocasio (PUR)
European Qualification Tournament	3	Sibel Güler (TUR); Elisavet Mystakidou (GRE); Pınar Budak (GER)
Host nation / Universality places	1	Maitha Al-Maktoum (UAE)
Total	16	

=== +67 kg ===
Competition	Places	Qualified athletes
World Qualification Tournament	3	Kyriaki Kouvari (GRE); Sarah Stevenson (GBR); María Espinoza (MEX)
African Qualification Tournament	2	Noha Abd Rabo (EGY); Khaoula Ben Hamza (TUN)
Asian Qualification Tournament	3	Che Chew Chan (MAS); Nadin Dawani (JOR); Evgeniya Karimova (UZB)
Oceania Qualification Tournament	1	Amy Ash (AUS)
Pan American Qualification Tournament	3	Lorena Benítes (ECU); Natália Falavigna (BRA); Adriana Carmona (VEN)
European Qualification Tournament	3	Rosana Simón (ESP); Karolina Kedzierska (SWE); Nina Solheim (NOR)
Host nation / Universality places	1	Chen Zhong (CHN)
Total	16	
