= Taekwondo at the 2008 Summer Olympics – Men's 68 kg =

Taekwondo competition

Men's 68 kg at the Games of the XXIX Olympiad
- Venue: Beijing Science and Technology University Gymnasium
- Date: 21 August 2008
- Competitors: 16 from 16 nations

Medalists
1st place, gold medalist(s)		Son Tae-Jin	South Korea
2nd place, silver medalist(s)		Mark López	United States
3rd place, bronze medalist(s)		Servet Tazegül	Turkey
3rd place, bronze medalist(s)		Sung Yu-Chi	Chinese Taipei

The men's 68 kg competition in taekwondo at the 2008 Summer Olympics in Beijing took place on August 21 the Beijing Science and Technology University Gymnasium.

== Competition format ==
The main bracket consisted of a single elimination tournament, culminating in the gold medal match. Two bronze medals were awarded at the taekwondo competitions. A repechage was used to determine the bronze medal winners. Every competitor who lost to one of the two finalists competed in the repechage, another single-elimination competition. Each semifinal loser faced the last remaining repechage competitor from the opposite half of the bracket in a bronze medal match.

== Schedule ==
All times are China standard time (UTC+8)

Date	Time	Round
Thursday, 21 August 2008	11:00; 16:00; 17:30; 20:30	Preliminary Round; Quarterfinals; Semifinals; Final

== Qualifying athletes ==
Athlete	Country
Burak Hasan	Australia
Peter López	Peru
Isah Adam Muhammad	Nigeria
Idulio Islas	Mexico
Nesar Ahmad Bahave	Afghanistan
Mark López	United States
Rasul Abduraim	Kyrgyzstan
Daniel Manz	Germany
Servet Tazegül	Turkey
Gessler Viera	Cuba
Son Tae-Jin	South Korea
Dennis Bekkers	Netherlands
Dmitriy Kim	Uzbekistan
Ezedin Belgasem	Libya
Sun Yu-Chi	Chinese Taipei
Logan Campbell	New Zealand

== Results ==
Legend

- PTG — Won by points gap
- SUP — Won by superiority
- OT — Won on over time (Golden Point)

=== Main bracket ===
Preliminary round
1	Burak Hasan (AUS)	1
16	Peter López (PER)	3
8	Isah Adam Muhammad (NGR)	(SUP); 2
9	Idulio Islas (MEX)	2
5	Nesar Ahmad Bahave (AFG)	0
12	Mark López (USA)	3
4	Rasul Abduraim (KGZ)	0
13	Daniel Manz (GER)	1
6	Servet Tazegül (TUR)	4
11	Gessler Viera (CUB)	3
3	Son Tae-Jin (KOR)	4
14	Dennis Bekkers (NED)	3
7	Dmitriy Kim (UZB)
10	Ezedin Belgasem (LBA)	DSQ
2	Sung Yu-Chi (TPE)	4
15	Logan Campbell (NZL)	0

Quarterfinals
Peter López (PER)	3
Isah Adam Muhammad (NGR)	0
Mark López (USA)	3
Daniel Manz (GER)	1
Servet Tazegül (TUR)	0
Son Tae-Jin (KOR)	1
Dmitriy Kim (UZB)	2
Sung Yu-Chi (TPE)	3

Semifinals
Peter López (PER)	1
Mark López (USA)	2
Son Tae-Jin (KOR)	7
Sung Yu-Chi (TPE)	6

Gold medal match
Mark López (USA)	2
Son Tae-Jin (KOR)	3

=== Repechage ===
Round 1
Servet Tazegül (TUR)	3
Dennis Bekkers (NED)	2
Nesar Ahmad Bahave (AFG)	3
Daniel Manz (GER)	4

Bronze medal match
Servet Tazegül (TUR)	1
Peter López (PER)	0
Sung Yu-Chi (TPE)	4
Daniel Manz (GER)	3
