= Turkey at the 2008 Summer Olympics =

- IOC code: TUR
- NOC: Turkish National Olympic Committee
- Website: olimpiyat.org.tr (in English and Turkish)

in Beijing
- Competitors: 67 in 12 sports
- Flag bearer: Mehmet Özal
- Medals Ranked 38th: Gold 1 Silver 1 Bronze 3 Total 5

Summer Olympics appearances (overview)
- 1908; 1912; 1920; 1924; 1928; 1932; 1936; 1948; 1952; 1956; 1960; 1964; 1968; 1972; 1976; 1980; 1984; 1988; 1992; 1996; 2000; 2004; 2008; 2012; 2016; 2020; 2024; 2028

Other related appearances
- 1906 Intercalated Games

Turkey sent a team to compete at the 2008 Summer Olympics in Beijing, China. In total, 67 Turkish athletes went to Beijing, including 19 women.

== Medalists ==
Medal	Name	Sport	Event
Gold	Ramazan Şahin	Wrestling	Men's freestyle 66 kg
~~Silver~~	~~Elvan Abeylegesse~~	~~Athletics~~	~~Women's 5000 m~~
~~Silver~~	~~Elvan Abeylegesse~~	~~Athletics~~	~~Women's 10,000 m~~
Silver	Azize Tanrıkulu	Taekwondo	Women's 57 kg
~~Silver~~	~~Sibel Özkan~~	~~Weightlifting~~	~~Women's 48 kg~~
Bronze	Yakup Kılıç	Boxing	Men's 57 kg
Bronze	Servet Tazegül	Taekwondo	Men's 68 kg
Bronze	Nazmi Avluca	Wrestling	Men's Greco-Roman 84 kg

Medals by sport
Sport	1st place, gold medalist(s)	2nd place, silver medalist(s)	3rd place, bronze medalist(s)	Total
Boxing	0	0	1	1
Taekwondo	0	1	1	2
Wrestling	1	0	1	2
Total	1	1	3	5

== Competitors ==
Below is a list of Turkey's competitors by sport and selected biographies.

Sport	Men	Women	Total
Archery	1	1	2
Athletics	6	9	15
Boxing	5	0	5
Cycling	1	0	1
Judo	1	0	1
Sailing	5	1	6
Shooting	1	0	1
Swimming	8	3	11
Table tennis	1	1	2
Taekwondo	2	2	4
Weightlifting	4	2	6
Wrestling	13	0	13
Total	48	19	67

=== Abdil Ceylan ===
Abdil Ceylan
Personal information
- Born: April 30, 1983 (age 43) Çifteler, Eskişehir Province, Turkey

Sport
- Club: Kocaeli Büyükşehir Belediyesi Kağıt Spor Kulübü
- Coached by: Metin Sazak

Achievements and titles
- Personal bests: 10,000m: 29:45.42 (2006); HM: 1:06.13 (2005); Mar: 2:16.13 (2007)

Abdil Ceylan (born 30 April 1983 in Çifteler, Eskişehir Province, Turkey) is a Turkish long-distance and marathon runner. He participated at the 2008 Olympics.

He was coached by Metin Sazak and competed for the Kocaeli Büyükşehir Belediyesi Kağıt Spor Kulübü club.

He graduated from Gazi University in Ankara, where he studied in the School of Physical Education and Sports.

== Archery ==
Athlete	Event	Ranking round		Round of 64	Round of 32	Round of 16	Quarterfinals	Semifinals	Final / BM	
Athlete	Event	Score	Seed	Opposition Score	Opposition Score	Opposition Score	Opposition Score	Opposition Score	Opposition Score	Rank
Göktuğ Ergin	Men's individual	660	23	Pombo (POR) (42); W 106–103	Lee C-h (KOR) (8); L 109–117	Did not advance				
Zekiye Şatır	Women's individual	644	16	Romantzi (GRE) (49); L 103–105	Did not advance					

== Athletics ==
Key

- Note–Ranks given for track events are within the athlete's heat only
- Q = Qualified for the next round
- q = Qualified for the next round as a fastest loser or, in field events, by position without achieving the qualifying target
- NR = National record
- N/A = Round not applicable for the event
- Bye = Athlete not required to compete in round

Men
Track & road events

Athlete	Event	Heat		Final	
Athlete	Event	Result	Rank	Result	Rank
Halil Akkaş	3000 m steeplechase	8:44.70	12	Did not advance	
Selim Bayrak	5000 m	DNS		Did not advance	
Selim Bayrak	10000 m	—N/a		27:29.33	11
Abdil Ceylan	Marathon	—N/a		2:31:43	71
Recep Çelik	20 km walk	—N/a		1:32:54	49

Field events

Athlete	Event	Qualification		Final	
Athlete	Event	Distance	Position	Distance	Position
Eşref Apak	Hammer throw	74.45	16	Did not advance	
Ercüment Olgundeniz	Discus throw	60.83	20	Did not advance	

Women
Track & road events

Athlete	Event	Heat		Semifinal		Final	
Athlete	Event	Result	Rank	Result	Rank	Result	Rank
~~Elvan Abeylegesse~~	~~5000 m~~	14:58.79	5 Q	—N/a		15:42.74	DSQ (originally silver)
~~Elvan Abeylegesse~~	~~10000 m~~	—N/a				29:56.34	DSQ (originally silver)
Merve Aydın	800 m	2:04.75	4	Did not advance			
Alemitu Bekele	5000 m	15:10.92	3 Q	—N/a		15:48.48	7
Aslı Çakır	3000 m steeplechase	10:05.76	14	—N/a		Did not advance	
Bahar Doğan	Marathon	—N/a				2:37:12	50
Türkan Erişmiş	3000 m steeplechase	9:48.54	14	—N/a		Did not advance	
Nevin Yanıt	100 m hurdles	12.94	3 q	13.28	8	Did not advance	

Field events

Athlete	Event	Qualification		Final	
Athlete	Event	Distance	Position	Distance	Position
Karin Melis Mey	Long jump	6.42	24	Did not advance	
Sviatlana Sudak Torun	Hammer throw	68.22	18	Did not advance	

== Boxing ==
Athlete	Event	Round of 32	Round of 16	Quarterfinals	Semifinals	Final	
Athlete	Event	Opposition Result	Opposition Result	Opposition Result	Opposition Result	Opposition Result	Rank
Furkan Ulaş Memiş	Flyweight	Kumar (IND); L RET	Did not advance				
Yakup Kılıç	Featherweight	Bye	Shimizu (JPN); W 12–9	Chadi (ALG); W 13–6	Lomachenko (UKR); L 1–10	Did not advance	3rd place, bronze medalist(s)
Onur Şipal	Lightweight	Pedraza (PUR); L 3–10	Did not advance				
Adem Kılıçcı	Welterweight	Saunders (GBR); L 3–14	Did not advance				
Bahram Muzaffer	Light heavyweight	Aziz (KEN); W 8–3	Egan (IRL); L 2–10	Did not advance			

== Cycling ==
=== Mountain biking ===
Athlete	Event	Time	Rank
Bilal Akgül	Men's cross-country	LAP (2 laps)	35

== Judo ==
Athlete	Event	Preliminary	Round of 32	Round of 16	Quarterfinals	Semifinals	Repechage 1	Repechage 2	Repechage 3	Final / BM	
Athlete	Event	Opposition Result	Opposition Result	Opposition Result	Opposition Result	Opposition Result	Opposition Result	Opposition Result	Opposition Result	Opposition Result	Rank
Sezer Huysuz	Men's −73 kg	Bye	Iverson (AUS); W 1000–0000	Si (CHN); L 0001–0010	Did not advance						

== Sailing ==
Men

Athlete	Event	Race											Net points	Final rank
Athlete	Event	1	2	3	4	5	6	7	8	9	10	M*	Net points	Final rank
Ertuğrul İçingir	RS:X	DSQ	28	15	19	27	19	12	23	23	6	EL	172	22
Kemal Muslubaş	Laser	4	~~42~~	27	19	15	27	7	15	32	CAN	EL	146	18
Deniz Çınar (s); Ateş Çınar (c)	470	23	13	26	22	22	23	26	21	~~28~~	22	EL	198	28

Women

Athlete	Event	Race											Net points	Final rank
Athlete	Event	1	2	3	4	5	6	7	8	9	10	M*	Net points	Final rank
Sedef Köktentürk	RS:X	26	25	26	27	~~28~~	24	24	DNF	27	25	EL	242	27

Open

Athlete	Event	Race											Net points	Final rank
Athlete	Event	1	2	3	4	5	6	7	8	9	10	M*	Net points	Final rank
Ali Kemal Tüfekçi	Finn	20	~~21~~	13	18	14	19	6	17	CAN	CAN	EL	107	20

M = Medal race; EL = Eliminated – did not advance into the medal race;

== Shooting ==
Men

Athlete	Event	Qualification		Final	
Athlete	Event	Points	Rank	Points	Rank
Yusuf Dikeç	10 m air pistol	566	45	Did not advance	
Yusuf Dikeç	50 m pistol	552	23	Did not advance	

== Swimming ==
Men

Athlete	Event	Heat		Semifinal		Final	
Athlete	Event	Time	Rank	Time	Rank	Time	Rank
Ömer Aslanoğlu	200 m breaststroke	2:17.93	51	Did not advance			
Serkan Atasay	200 m individual medley	2:05.25	42	Did not advance			
Demir Atasoy	100 m breaststroke	1:02.25	39	Did not advance			
Derya Büyükuncu	100 m backstroke	55.43	30	Did not advance			
Derya Büyükuncu	200 m backstroke	1:59.86	22	Did not advance			
Deniz Nazar	400 m individual medley	4:30.80	28	—N/a		Did not advance	
Kaan Tayla	50 m freestyle	22.66	37	Did not advance			
Onur Uras	100 m butterfly	54.79	58	Did not advance			
Ediz Yıldırımer	1500 m freestyle	16.28.79	35	—N/a		Did not advance	

Women

Athlete	Event	Heat		Semifinal		Final	
Athlete	Event	Time	Rank	Time	Rank	Time	Rank
Dilara Buse Günaydın	100 m breaststroke	1:10.45	28	Did not advance			
Dilara Buse Günaydın	200 m breaststroke	2:31.86	32	Did not advance			
Gülşah Günenç	200 m butterfly	2:14.44	32	Did not advance			
İris Rosenberger	100 m butterfly	1:01.67	44	Did not advance			

== Table tennis ==
Athlete	Event	Preliminary round	Round 1	Round 2	Round 3	Round 4	Quarterfinals	Semifinals	Final / BM	
Athlete	Event	Opposition Result	Opposition Result	Opposition Result	Opposition Result	Opposition Result	Opposition Result	Opposition Result	Opposition Result	Rank
Cem Zeng	Men's singles	Merotohun (NGR); W 4–2	Karakašević (SRB); L 1–4	Did not advance						
Melek Hu	Women's singles	Bye	Pan L-c (TPE); W 4–1	Schall (GER); W 4–2	Fukuhara (JPN); L 1–4	Did not advance				

== Taekwondo ==
Athlete	Event	Round of 16	Quarterfinals	Semifinals	Repechage	Bronze Medal	Final	
Athlete	Event	Opposition Result	Opposition Result	Opposition Result	Opposition Result	Opposition Result	Opposition Result	Rank
Servet Tazegül	Men's −68 kg	Viera (CUB); W 4–3	Son T-J (KOR); L 0–1	Did not advance	Bekkers (NED); W 3–2	Lopez (PER); W 1–0	Did not advance	3rd place, bronze medalist(s)
Bahri Tanrıkulu	Men's −80 kg	S Lopez (USA); L 0–3	Did not advance					
Azize Tanrıkulu	Women's −57 kg	Teo (MAS); W 7–4	D Lopez (USA); W 2–1	Zubčić (CRO); W 5–3	Bye		Lim S-J (KOR); L 0–1	2nd place, silver medalist(s)
Sibel Güler	Women's −67 kg	Sánchez (ARG); L 0–4	Did not advance					

== Weightlifting ==
Men

Athlete	Event	Snatch		Clean & Jerk		Total	Rank
Athlete	Event	Result	Rank	Result	Rank	Total	Rank
Sedat Artuç	−56 kg	~~115~~	DNF	—	—	—	DNF
Taner Sağır	−77 kg	~~165~~	DNF	—	—	—	DNF
İzzet İnce	−85 kg	170	6	~~190~~	DNF	170	DNF
Bünyamin Sudaş	−105 kg	166	15	207	14	373	14

Women

Athlete	Event	Snatch		Clean & Jerk		Total	Rank
Athlete	Event	Result	Rank	Result	Rank	Total	Rank
Nurcan Taylan	−48 kg	~~84~~	DNF	—	—	—	DNF
~~Sibel Özkan~~	~~−48 kg~~	88	2	111	2	199	DSQ (officially silver)

== Wrestling ==
Key:

- VT - Victory by Fall.
- PP - Decision by Points - the loser with technical points.
- PO - Decision by Points - the loser without technical points.

Men's freestyle

Athlete	Event	Qualification	Round of 16	Quarterfinal	Semifinal	Repechage 1	Repechage 2	Final / BM	
Athlete	Event	Opposition Result	Opposition Result	Opposition Result	Opposition Result	Opposition Result	Opposition Result	Opposition Result	Rank
Sezar Akgül	−55 kg	Bye	Matsunaga (JPN); L 0–3 ^{PO}	Did not advance		Diatta (SEN); W 3–0 ^{PO}	Mansurov (UZB); L 0–3 ^{PO}	Did not advance	7
Tevfik Odabaşı	−60 kg	Ramazanov (MKD); L 1–3 ^{PP}	Did not advance						16
Ramazan Şahin	−66 kg	Bye	Garzón (CUB); W 3–1 ^{PP}	Taghavi (IRI); W 3–1 ^{PP}	Tushishvili (GEO); W 3–1 ^{PP}	Bye		Stadnik (UKR); W 3–1 ^{PP}	1st place, gold medalist(s)
Ahmet Gülhan	−74 kg	Abdo (AUS); W 3–0 ^{PO}	Saitiev (RUS); L 0–3 ^{PO}	Did not advance		Cho B-K (KOR); L 1–3 ^{PP}	Did not advance		9
Serhat Balcı	−84 kg	Bye	Cross (CAN); W 3–1 ^{PP}	Salas (CUB); W 3–0 ^{PO}	Abdusalomov (TJK); L 0–3 ^{PO}	Bye		Danko (UKR); L 0–3 ^{PO}	5
Hakan Koç	−96 kg	Bye	Kehrer (GER); W 3–1 ^{PP}	Muradov (RUS); L 0–3 ^{PO}	Did not advance	Bye	Tibilov (UKR); L 1–3 ^{PP}	Did not advance	7
Aydın Polatçı	−120 kg	Bye	Ishchenko (UKR); W 3–1 ^{PP}	Mutalimov (KAZ); L 1–3 ^{PP}	Did not advance				8

Men's Greco-Roman

Athlete	Event	Qualification	Round of 16	Quarterfinal	Semifinal	Repechage 1	Repechage 2	Final / BM	
Athlete	Event	Opposition Result	Opposition Result	Opposition Result	Opposition Result	Opposition Result	Opposition Result	Opposition Result	Rank
Soner Sucu	−60 kg	Bye	Albiev (RUS); L 0–3 ^{PO}	Did not advance		Monzón (CUB); L 1–3 ^{PP}	Did not advance		7
Şeref Eroğlu	−66 kg	Gergov (BUL); L 1–3 ^{PP}	Did not advance						16
Şeref Tüfenk	−74 kg	Abdulov (AZE); L 1–3 ^{PP}	Did not advance						16
Nazmi Avluca	−84 kg	Bye	Khasaia (GEO); W 3–1 ^{PP}	Tahmasebi (IRI); W 3–1 ^{PP}	Fodor (HUN); L 1–3 ^{PP}	Bye		Ma Sy (CHN); W 3–1 ^{PP}	3rd place, bronze medalist(s)
Mehmet Özal	−96 kg	Kryoka (UKR); W 3–1 ^{PP}	Ežerskis (LTU); L 1–3 ^{PP}	Did not advance					11
Rıza Kayaalp	−120 kg	Bye	Mizgaitis (LTU); L 1–3 ^{PP}	Did not advance					11

== See also ==
- Turkey at the 2008 Summer Paralympics
