= Peru at the 2008 Summer Olympics =

- IOC code: PER
- NOC: Peruvian Olympic Committee
- Website: www.coperu.org (in Spanish)

in Beijing
- Competitors: 13 in 10 sports
- Flag bearers: Sixto Barrera (opening); Peter López (closing)
- Medals: Gold 0 Silver 0 Bronze 0 Total 0

Summer Olympics appearances (overview)
- 1900; 1904–1932; 1936; 1948; 1952; 1956; 1960; 1964; 1968; 1972; 1976; 1980; 1984; 1988; 1992; 1996; 2000; 2004; 2008; 2012; 2016; 2020; 2024

Peru competed in the 2008 Summer Olympics which was held in Beijing, People's Republic of China from August 8 to August 24, 2008. The country was represented by at least twelve athletes, who competed in the fields of athletics, badminton, swimming, taekwondo, shooting, wrestling, judo and fencing.

== Athletics ==
Key

- Note – Ranks given for track events are within the athlete's heat only
- Q = Qualified for the next round
- q = Qualified for the next round as a fastest loser or, in field events, by position without achieving the qualifying target
- NR = National record
- N/A = Round not applicable for the event
- Bye = Athlete not required to compete in round

Men
Track & road events

Athlete	Event	Final	
Athlete	Event	Result	Rank
Constantino León	Marathon	2:28:04	61

Field events

Athlete	Event	Qualification		Final	
Athlete	Event	Distance	Position	Distance	Position
Louis Tristán	Long jump	7.62	32	Did not advance	

Women
Track & road events

Athlete	Event	Final	
Athlete	Event	Result	Rank
María Portillo	Marathon	2:35:19 NR	39

== Badminton ==
Athlete	Event	Round of 64	Round of 32	Round of 16	Quarterfinal	Semifinal	Final / BM	
Athlete	Event	Opposition Score	Opposition Score	Opposition Score	Opposition Score	Opposition Score	Opposition Score	Rank
Claudia Rivero	Women's singles	Bye	Pi (FRA); L 6–21, 9–21	Did not advance				

== Fencing ==
Women

Athlete	Event	Round of 64	Round of 32	Round of 16	Quarterfinal	Semifinal	Final / BM	
Athlete	Event	Opposition Score	Opposition Score	Opposition Score	Opposition Score	Opposition Score	Opposition Score	Rank
María Luisa Doig	Individual foil	Wächter (GER); L 4–15	Did not advance					

== Judo ==
Athlete	Event	Preliminary	Round of 32	Round of 16	Quarterfinals	Semifinals	Repechage 1	Repechage 2	Repechage 3	Final / BM	
Athlete	Event	Opposition Result	Opposition Result	Opposition Result	Opposition Result	Opposition Result	Opposition Result	Opposition Result	Opposition Result	Opposition Result	Rank
Carlos Zegarra	Men's +100 kg	Bye	Lopez (ARG); W 1001–0001	Brayson (CUB); L 0000–1000	Did not advance		Hachache (LIB); L 0100–0200	Did not advance			

== Sailing ==
Women

Athlete	Event	Race											Net points	Final rank
Athlete	Event	1	2	3	4	5	6	7	8	9	10	M*	Net points	Final rank
Paloma Schmidt	Laser Radial	9	26	27	~~28~~	14	26	22	12	28	CAN	EL	163	26

M = Medal race; EL = Eliminated – did not advance into the medal race; CAN = Race cancelled

== Shooting ==
Men

Athlete	Event	Qualification		Final	
Athlete	Event	Points	Rank	Points	Rank
Marco Matellini	Skeet	95	40	Did not advance	

== Swimming ==
Men

Athlete	Event	Heat		Semifinal		Final	
Athlete	Event	Time	Rank	Time	Rank	Time	Rank
Emmanuel Crescimbeni	200 m butterfly	2:02.13	43	Did not advance			

Women

Athlete	Event	Heat		Semifinal		Final	
Athlete	Event	Time	Rank	Time	Rank	Time	Rank
Valeria Silva	100 m breaststroke	1:11.64	38	Did not advance			

== Taekwondo ==
Athlete	Event	Round of 16	Quarterfinals	Semifinals	Repechage	Bronze Medal	Final	
Athlete	Event	Opposition Result	Opposition Result	Opposition Result	Opposition Result	Opposition Result	Opposition Result	Rank
Peter López	Men's −68 kg	Hasan (AUS); W 3–1	Muhammad (NGR); W 3–0	M López (USA); L 1–2	Bye	Tazegül (TUR); L 0–1	Did not advance	5

== Weightlifting ==
Athlete	Event	Snatch		Clean & Jerk		Total	Rank
Athlete	Event	Result	Rank	Result	Rank	Total	Rank
Cristina Cornejo	Women's +75 kg	97	11	128	9	225	8

== Wrestling ==
Key

- VT - Victory by Fall.
- PP - Decision by Points - the loser with technical points.
- PO - Decision by Points - the loser without technical points.

Men's Greco-Roman

Athlete	Event	Qualification	Round of 16	Quarterfinal	Semifinal	Repechage 1	Repechage 2	Final / BM	
Athlete	Event	Opposition Result	Opposition Result	Opposition Result	Opposition Result	Opposition Result	Opposition Result	Opposition Result	Rank
Sixto Barrera	−74 kg	Bye	Venckaitis (LTU); W 3–1 ^{PP}	Chang Yx (CHN); L 1–3 ^{PP}	Did not advance	Bye	Yanakiev (BUL); L 0–3	Did not advance	11

== See also ==
- Peru at the 2008 Summer Paralympics
- Peru at the 2007 Pan American Games
