= Son Tae-jin =

South Korean taekwondo practitioner

Son Tae-Jin
Personal information
- Born: 5 May 1988 (age 38) Gyeongsan, North Gyeongsang Province, South Korea
- Occupation: Taekwondo practitioner
Medal record
Men's taekwondo
Representing South Korea
Men's taekwondo
Olympic Games
Gold medal – first place	2008 Beijing	68 kg

Son Tae-jin (Korean: 손태진; Hanja: 孫泰珍; Korean pronunciation: [son.tʰɛ̝.dʑin]; born May 5, 1988, in Gyeongsan, North Gyeongsang Province, South Korea) is a South Korean Taekwondo practitioner.

In May 2007, Son first competed in the World Taekwondo Championships in Beijing, China at the age of 19, but lost to Algimiro Mejias of Venezuela in the bantamweight (-62 kg) first round.

In September 2007, he finished in 1st place in the -68 kg category at the World Qualification Tournament in Manchester, England, by defeating 2005 world featherweight (-67 kg) champion Mark López of United States in the quarterfinals and 2007 world featherweight (-67 kg) champion Gessler Viera Abreu of Cuba in the final.

In May 2008, Son eventually qualified for the 2008 Beijing Olympics, defeating 2006 Asian Game winner Kim Ju-Young and 2004 Olympic bronze medalist Song Myeong-Seob at the 2008 Korean Olympic Taekwondo Trials.

On August 21, 2008, Son won the gold medal in the -68 kg category at the 2008 Olympic Games in Beijing, defeating Mark López of the United States in the final.

On July 22, 2009, Son was knocked out by Park Hyung-Jin in Round 2 of the featherweight (-68 kg) final match at the 2009 President's Cup in Ulsan, South Korea via a back spinning hook kick. He collapsed to the mat and was disoriented after the stand-up. Due to the defeat, Son didn't qualify as a member of the 2010 South Korean national taekwondo team.

In 2010, Son won the gold medal in the World Combat Games by defeating Reza Naderian in the final.
