= Uzbekistan at the 2008 Summer Olympics =

- IOC code: UZB
- NOC: National Olympic Committee of the Republic of Uzbekistan
- Website: www.olympic.uz (in Uzbek and English)

in Beijing
- Competitors: 56 in 13 sports
- Flag bearer: Dilshod Mahmudov
- Medals Ranked 62nd: Gold 0 Silver 1 Bronze 3 Total 4

Summer Olympics appearances (overview)
- 1996; 2000; 2004; 2008; 2012; 2016; 2020; 2024

Other related appearances
- Russian Empire (1900–1912); Soviet Union (1952–1988); Unified Team (1992)

Uzbekistan competed in the 2008 Summer Olympics held in Beijing, People's Republic of China from August 8 to August 24, 2008, with a team of 58 athletes.

== Medalists ==
Medal	Name	Sport	Event
Silver	Abdullo Tangriev	Judo	Men's +100 kg
Bronze	Anton Fokin	Gymnastics	Men's parallel bars
Bronze	Rishod Sobirov	Judo	Men's 60 kg
Bronze	Ekaterina Khilko	Gymnastics	Women's trampoline
Silver	Soslan Tigiev	Wrestling	Men's 74 kg
Gold	Artur Taymazov	Wrestling	Men's 120 kg

== Athletics ==
Key

- Note–Ranks given for track events are within the athlete's heat only
- Q = Qualified for the next round
- q = Qualified for the next round as a fastest loser or, in field events, by position without achieving the qualifying target
- NR = National record
- N/A = Round not applicable for the event
- Bye = Athlete not required to compete in round

Men
Track & road events

Athlete	Event	Heat		Quarterfinal		Semifinal		Final	
Athlete	Event	Result	Rank	Result	Rank	Result	Rank	Result	Rank
Oleg Juravlyov	200 m	22.31	8	Did not advance					
Oleg Juravlyov	800 m	DNS		—		Did not advance			
Oleg Normatov	110 m hurdles	14.00	6	Did not advance					

Field events

Athlete	Event	Qualification		Final	
Athlete	Event	Distance	Position	Distance	Position
Leonid Andreev	Pole vault	5.65	2 q	NM	—
Bobur Shokirjonov	Javelin throw	69.54	33	Did not advance	

Combined events – Decathlon

Athlete	Event	100 m	LJ	SP	HJ	400 m	110H	DT	PV	JT	1500 m	Final	Rank
Pavel Andreev	Result	11.47	6.62	14.15	1.99	DNF	DNS	—	—	—	—	DNF	
Pavel Andreev	Points	759	725	738	794	0	0	—	—	—	—	DNF	
Vitaliy Smirnov	Result	11.56	NM	13.51	DNS	—	—	—	—	—	—	DNF	
Vitaliy Smirnov	Points	740	0	698	0	—	—	—	—	—	—	DNF	

Women
Track & road events

Athlete	Event	Heat		Quarterfinal		Semifinal		Final	
Athlete	Event	Result	Rank	Result	Rank	Result	Rank	Result	Rank
Guzel Khubbieva	100 m	11.44	3 Q	11.49	7	Did not advance			
Guzel Khubbieva	200 m	23.44	6 q	DNS		Did not advance			

Field events

Athlete	Event	Qualification		Final	
Athlete	Event	Distance	Position	Distance	Position
Nadiya Dusanova	High jump	1.85	26	Did not advance	
Anastasiya Juravleva	Triple jump	13.36	29	Did not advance	
Svetlana Radzivil	High jump	1.89	18	Did not advance	
Anastasiya Svechnikova	Javelin throw	55.31	36	Did not advance	

Combined events – Heptathlon

Athlete	Event	100H	HJ	SP	200 m	LJ	JT	800 m	Final	Rank
Yuliya Tarasova	Result	14.03	1.71	12.60	24.36	5.92	43.31	2:26.19	5785	26*
Yuliya Tarasova	Points	974	867	701	946	946	731	741	5785	26*

* The athlete who finished in second place, Lyudmila Blonska of Ukraine, tested positive for a banned substance. Both the A and the B tests were positive, therefore Blonska was stripped of her silver medal, and Tarasova moved up a position.

== Boxing ==
Uzbekistan qualified seven boxers for the Olympic boxing tournament. Atoev was the first to qualify, earning a spot in the light heavyweight class at the 2007 World Championships. Four more boxers (both Sultonovs, Mahmudov, and Rasulov) qualified at the first Asian qualifying tournament. Doniyorov and Tadjibayev both qualified at the second qualifier.

Athlete	Event	Round of 32	Round of 16	Quarterfinals	Semifinals	Final	
Athlete	Event	Opposition Result	Opposition Result	Opposition Result	Opposition Result	Opposition Result	Rank
Rafikjon Sultonov	Light flyweight	Oubaali (FRA); L 7–8	Did not advance				
Tulashboy Doniyorov	Flyweight	Irungu (KEN); W 10–1	Kumar (IND); L 6–13	Did not advance			
Hoorshid Tojibaev	Bantamweight	Rahimov (GER); W 11–2	Julie (MRI); L 4–16	Did not advance			
Bahodirjon Sultonov	Featherweight	Lakra (IND); W 9–5	Lomachenko (UKR); L 1–13	Did not advance			
Dilshod Mahmudov	Welterweight	Khalsi (MAR); W 11–3	Chiguer (FRA); W 8–3	Sarsekbayev (KAZ); L 7–12	Did not advance		
Elshod Rasulov	Middleweight	Raymond (FRA); W 8–2	Hakobyan (ARM); W RSC	Correa (CUB); L 7–9	Did not advance		
Abbos Atoev	Light heavyweight	Kurbanov (TJK); L 3–11	Did not advance				

== Canoeing ==
=== Sprint ===
Athlete	Event	Heats		Semifinals		Final	
Athlete	Event	Time	Rank	Time	Rank	Time	Rank
Vadim Menkov	Men's C-1 500 m	1:52.793	4 QS	1:55.610	6	Did not advance	
Vadim Menkov	Men's C-1 1000 m	3:56.793	1 QF	Bye		3:54.237	4

Qualification Legend: QS = Qualify to semi-final; QF = Qualify directly to final

== Cycling ==
=== Road ===
Athlete	Event	Time	Rank
Sergey Lagutin	Men's road race	6:31:08	51

== Gymnastics ==
=== Artistic ===
Men

Athlete	Event	Qualification								Final							
Athlete	Event	Apparatus						Total	Rank	Apparatus						Total	Rank
Athlete	Event	F	PH	R	V	PB	HB	Total	Rank	F	PH	R	V	PB	HB	Total	Rank
Anton Fokin	All-around	14.325	14.725	14.825	15.625	16.150	13.625	89.275	20 Q	14.525	15.150	14.700	15.575	16.125	13.675	89.750	16
Anton Fokin	Parallel bars	—				16.150	—	16.150	3 Q	—				16.200	—	16.200	3rd place, bronze medalist(s)

Women

Athlete	Event	Qualification						Final					
Athlete	Event	Apparatus				Total	Rank	Apparatus				Total	Rank
Athlete	Event	F	V	UB	BB	Total	Rank	F	V	UB	BB	Total	Rank
Luiza Galiulina	All-around	13.300	12.225	14.175	12.375	52.075	59	Did not advance					

=== Trampoline ===
Athlete	Event	Qualification		Final	
Athlete	Event	Score	Rank	Score	Rank
Ekaterina Khilko	Women's	63.90	8 Q	36.90	3rd place, bronze medalist(s)

== Judo ==
Men

Athlete	Event	Preliminary	Round of 32	Round of 16	Quarterfinals	Semifinals	Repechage 1	Repechage 2	Repechage 3	Final / BM	
Athlete	Event	Opposition Result	Opposition Result	Opposition Result	Opposition Result	Opposition Result	Opposition Result	Opposition Result	Opposition Result	Opposition Result	Rank
Rishod Sobirov	−60 kg	Bye	Rebahi (ALG); W 1001–0000	Petřikov (CZE); W 0001–0000	Houkes (NED); L 0000–1001	Did not advance	Bye	Akhondzadeh (IRI); W 0010–0001	Will (CAN); W 0011–0000	Dragin (FRA); W 0001–0000	3rd place, bronze medalist(s)
Mirali Sharipov	−66 kg	Bye	Peñas (ESP); W 1010–0000	Benamadi (ALG); W 0001–0000	Uchishiba (JPN); L 0010–0201	Did not advance	Bye	Miresmaeili (IRI); W 0010–0001	El Hady (EGY); W 0101–0001	Pak (PRK); L 0001–0100	5
Shokir Muminov	−73 kg	—	Ježek (CZE); W 1000–0001	Wang (KOR); L 0000–1100	Did not advance		Ibragimov (KAZ); W 1010–0001	Guilheiro (BRA); L 0000–1000	Did not advance		
Khurshid Nabiev	−90 kg	—	Gordon (GBR); W 0100–0020	Mammadov (AZE); L 0010–0110	Did not advance						
Utkir Kurbanov	−100 kg	—	Brata (ROU); L 0001–1000	Did not advance							
Abdullo Tangriev	+100 kg	Bye	Tölzer (GER); W 0211–0000	Wojnarowicz (POL); W 0010–0000	Riner (FRA); W 0001–0000	Brayson (CUB); W 1010–0011	Bye			Ishii (JPN); L 0000–0010	2nd place, silver medalist(s)

Women

Athlete	Event	Round of 32	Round of 16	Quarterfinals	Semifinals	Repechage 1	Repechage 2	Repechage 3	Final / BM	
Athlete	Event	Opposition Result	Opposition Result	Opposition Result	Opposition Result	Opposition Result	Opposition Result	Opposition Result	Opposition Result	Rank
Zinura Djuraeva	−52 kg	Tarangul (GER); L 0000–1101	Did not advance							
Mariya Shekerova	+78 kg	Mondière (FRA); L 0000–0200	Did not advance							

== Rowing ==
Men

Athlete	Event	Heats		Quarterfinals		Semifinals		Final	
Athlete	Event	Time	Rank	Time	Rank	Time	Rank	Time	Rank
Ruslan Naurzaliev	Single sculls	7:58.43	5 SE/F	Bye		7:35.12	3 FE	7:09.98	26

Qualification Legend: FA=Final A (medal); FB=Final B (non-medal); FC=Final C (non-medal); FD=Final D (non-medal); FE=Final E (non-medal); FF=Final F (non-medal); SA/B=Semifinals A/B; SC/D=Semifinals C/D; SE/F=Semifinals E/F; QF=Quarterfinals; R=Repechage

== Shooting ==
Men

Athlete	Event	Qualification		Final	
Athlete	Event	Points	Rank	Points	Rank
Dilshod Mukhtarov	10 m air pistol	580	15	Did not advance	
Dilshod Mukhtarov	50 m pistol	549	31	Did not advance	

Women

Athlete	Event	Qualification		Final	
Athlete	Event	Points	Rank	Points	Rank
Elena Kuznetsova	10 m air rifle	392	32	Did not advance	
Elena Kuznetsova	50 m rifle 3 positions	573	30	Did not advance	

== Swimming ==
Men

Athlete	Event	Heat		Semifinal		Final	
Athlete	Event	Time	Rank	Time	Rank	Time	Rank
Danil Bugakov	100 m backstroke	56.59	39	Did not advance			
Danil Bugakov	200 m individual medley	2:10.04	46	Did not advance			
Ivan Demyanenko	100 m breaststroke	1:05.14	56	Did not advance			
Ibrahim Nazarov	200 m freestyle	1:56.27	53	Did not advance			
Sergey Pankov	200 m backstroke	2:03.51	38	Did not advance			
Petr Romashkin	100 m freestyle	51.83	55	Did not advance			

Women

Athlete	Event	Heat		Semifinal		Final	
Athlete	Event	Time	Rank	Time	Rank	Time	Rank
Mariya Bugakova	50 m freestyle	29.73	68	Did not advance			
Irina Shlemova	100 m freestyle	58.77	46	Did not advance			

Qualifiers for the latter rounds (Q) of all events were decided on a time only basis, therefore positions shown are overall results versus competitors in all heats.

== Taekwondo ==
Athlete	Event	Round of 16	Quarterfinals	Semifinals	Repechage	Bronze Medal	Final	
Athlete	Event	Opposition Result	Opposition Result	Opposition Result	Opposition Result	Opposition Result	Opposition Result	Rank
Dmitriy Kim	Men's −68 kg	Tlish (LBA); W DSQ	Sung Y-C (TPE); L 2–3	Did not advance				
Akmal Irgashev	Men's +80 kg	García (ESP); W 11–10	Cha D-M (KOR); L 0–2	Did not advance	Moitland (CRC); W 6–5	Chukwumerije (NGR); L 3–4	Did not advance	5
Evgeniya Karimova	Women's +67 kg	Che C C (MAS); L 4–5	Did not advance					

== Tennis ==
Athlete	Event	Round of 64	Round of 32	Round of 16	Quarterfinals	Semifinals	Final / BM	
Athlete	Event	Opposition Score	Opposition Score	Opposition Score	Opposition Score	Opposition Score	Opposition Score	Rank
Akgul Amanmuradova	Women's singles	Schiavone (ITA); L 4–6, 2–6	Did not advance					

== Weightlifting ==
Athlete	Event	Snatch		Clean & Jerk		Total	Rank
Athlete	Event	Result	Rank	Result	Rank	Total	Rank
Sherzodjon Yusupov	Men's −77 kg	144	18	178	16	322	16
Mansurbek Chashemov	Men's −85 kg	165	9	202	7	367	7

== Wrestling ==
Key:

- VT - Victory by Fall.
- PP - Decision by Points - the loser with technical points.
- PO - Decision by Points - the loser without technical points.

Men's freestyle

Athlete	Event	Qualification	Round of 16	Quarterfinal	Semifinal	Repechage 1	Repechage 2	Final / BM	
Athlete	Event	Opposition Result	Opposition Result	Opposition Result	Opposition Result	Opposition Result	Opposition Result	Opposition Result	Rank
Dilshod Mansurov	−55 kg	Mukhtarbekuly (KAZ); W 3–0 ^{PO}	Gadzhiev (BLR); W 3–1 ^{PP}	Matsunaga (JPN); L 1–3 ^{PP}	Did not advance	Bye	Akgul (TUR); W 3–0 ^{PO}	Kudukhov (RUS); L 0–3 ^{PO}	5
Soslan Tigiev	−74 kg	Bye	Ştefan (ROU); W 3–0 ^{PO}	Bentinidis (GRE); W 3–0 ^{PO}	Haidarau (BLR); W 3–0 ^{PO}	Bye		Saitiev (RUS); L 1–3 ^{PP}	DSQ
Zaurbek Sokhiev	−84 kg	Laliyev (KAZ); W 3–1 ^{PP}	Ketoev (RUS); L 1–3 ^{PP}	Did not advance					9
Kurban Kurbanov	−96 kg	Zilberman (CAN); W 3–1 ^{PP}	Kiss (HUN); W 3–1 ^{PP}	Gazyumov (AZE); L 0–3 ^{PO}	Did not advance				7
Artur Taymazov	−120 kg	Bye	Isayev (AZE); W 3–1 ^{PP}	Rodríguez (CUB); W 3–1 ^{PP}	Musuľbes (SVK); W 3–0 ^{PO}	Bye		Akhmedov (RUS); W 3–0 ^{PO}	DSQ

Men's Greco-Roman

Athlete	Event	Qualification	Round of 16	Quarterfinal	Semifinal	Repechage 1	Repechage 2	Final / BM	
Athlete	Event	Opposition Result	Opposition Result	Opposition Result	Opposition Result	Opposition Result	Opposition Result	Opposition Result	Rank
Ildar Hafizov	−55 kg	Mankiev (RUS); L 1–3 ^{PP}	Did not advance			Fris (SRB); L 1–3 ^{PP}	Did not advance		10
Dilshod Aripov	−60 kg	Štefanek (SRB); W 3–1 ^{PP}	Tyumenbayev (KGZ); L 1–3 ^{PP}	Did not advance					11
David Saldadze	−120 kg	Botev (AZE); L 1–3 ^{PP}	Did not advance						14
