= Nigeria at the 2008 Summer Olympics =

- IOC code: NGR
- NOC: Nigeria Olympic Committee
- Website: www.nigeriaolympiccommittee.org

in Beijing
- Competitors: 74 in 10 sports
- Flag bearer: Bose Kaffo
- Medals Ranked 59th: Gold 0 Silver 3 Bronze 2 Total 5

Summer Olympics appearances (overview)
- 1952; 1956; 1960; 1964; 1968; 1972; 1976; 1980; 1984; 1988; 1992; 1996; 2000; 2004; 2008; 2012; 2016; 2020; 2024

Nigeria competed in the 2008 Summer Olympics which were held in Beijing, People's Republic of China from August 8 to August 24, 2008.

== Medalists ==
Medal	Name	Sport	Event
Silver	Nigeria national football team: Olubayo Adefemi; Dele Adeleye; Oluwafemi Ajilore; Efe Ambrose; Victor Anichebe; Onyekachi Apam; Emmanuel Ekpo; Ikechukwu Ezenwa; Promise Isaac; Monday James; Sani Kaita; Chinedu Obasi; Victor Nsofor Obinna; Peter Odemwingie; Chibuzor Okonkwo; Solomon Okoronkwo; Oladapo Olufemi; Ambruse Vanzekin	Football	Men's tournament
Silver	Franca Idoko; Gloria Kemasuode; Halimat Ismaila; Oludamola Osayomi; Agnes Osazuwa (heats only)	Athletics	Women's 4 × 100 m relay
Silver	Blessing Okagbare	Athletics	Women's long jump
Bronze	Chika Chukwumerije	Taekwondo	Men's +80 kg
Bronze	Mariam Usman	Weightlifting	Women's +75kg

== Athletics ==
Fourteen men and eighteen women qualified to represent Nigeria in athletics.

Key

- Note – Ranks given for track events are within the athlete's heat only
- Q = Qualified for the next round
- q = Qualified for the next round as a fastest loser or, in field events, by position without achieving the qualifying target
- NR = National record
- N/A = Round not applicable for the event
- Bye = Athlete not required to compete in round

Men
Track & road events

Athlete	Event	Heat		Quarterfinal		Semifinal		Final	
Athlete	Event	Result	Rank	Result	Rank	Result	Rank	Result	Rank
Uchenna Emedolu	100 m	10.46	4	Did not advance					
Olusoji Fasuba	100 m	10.29	2 Q	10.21	4	Did not advance			
James Godday	400 m	45.49	2 Q	—N/a		45.24	6	Did not advance	
Obinna Joseph Metu	100 m	10.34	2 Q	10.27	6	Did not advance			
Obinna Joseph Metu	200 m	20.62	1 Q	20.65	6	Did not advance			
Selim Nurudeen	110 m hurdles	13.58	3 Q	13.66	4	Did not advance			
Saul Weigopwa	400 m	45.19	2 Q	—N/a		45.02	5	Did not advance	
Oluwunmi Aje; Uchenna Emedolu; Olusoji Fasuba; Obinna Joseph Metu; Onyeabor Ngwogu; Chinedu Oriala	4 × 100 m relay	DNF		—N/a				Did not advance	

Women
Track & road events

Athlete	Event	Heat		Quarterfinal		Semifinal		Final	
Athlete	Event	Result	Rank	Result	Rank	Result	Rank	Result	Rank
Folashade Abugan	400 m	51.45	3 Q	—N/a		51.30	6	Did not advance	
Toyin Augustus	100 m hurdles	13.34	7	—N/a		Did not advance			
Joy Amechi Eze	400 m	51.97	4 q	—N/a		51.87	5	Did not advance	
Franca Idoko	100 m	11.61	4 q	11.66	7	Did not advance			
Halimat Ismaila	100 m	11.72	4	Did not advance					
Gloria Kemasuode	200 m	23.72	6	Did not advance					
Muizat Ajoke Odumosu	400 m	51.39	3 Q	—N/a		52.45	7	Did not advance	
Oludamola Osayomi	100 m	11.13	1 Q	11.28	2 Q	11.44	8	Did not advance	
Oludamola Osayomi	200 m	23.31	3 Q	23.27	6	Did not advance			
Franca Idoko; Halimat Ismaila; Gloria Kemasuode; Oludamola Osayomi; Agnes Osazuwa*	4 × 100 m relay	43.43	4 q	—N/a				43.04	2nd place, silver medalist(s)
Endurance Abinuwa; Folashade Abugan; Joy Amechi Eze; Oluoma Nwoke; Muizat Ajoke Odumosu; Gladys Stephen	4 × 400 m relay	3:24.10	4 q	—N/a				3:23.74	7

* Competed in the heats only

Field events

Athlete	Event	Qualification		Final	
Athlete	Event	Distance	Position	Distance	Position
Doreen Amata	High jump	1.89	=16	Did not advance	
Vivian Chukwuemeka	Shot put	17.15	24	Did not advance	
Chinonye Ohadugha	Triple jump	13.29	30	Did not advance	
Blessing Okagbare	Long jump	6.59	12 q	6.91	2nd place, silver medalist(s)

== Badminton ==
Athlete	Event	Round of 64	Round of 32	Round of 16	Quarterfinal	Semifinal	Final / BM	
Athlete	Event	Opposition Score	Opposition Score	Opposition Score	Opposition Score	Opposition Score	Opposition Score	Rank
Grace Daniel	Women's singles	Ludíková (CZE); L 13–21, 8–21	Did not advance					

== Boxing ==
Nigeria qualified four boxers for the Olympic boxing tournament. All four qualified at the second African continental qualifying tournament.

Athlete	Event	Round of 32	Round of 16	Quarterfinals	Semifinals	Final	
Athlete	Event	Opposition Result	Opposition Result	Opposition Result	Opposition Result	Opposition Result	Rank
Rasheed Lawal	Lightweight	Bye	Javakhyan (ARM); L 0–12	Did not advance			
Dauda Izobo	Light heavyweight	B Samir (GHA); L RSC	Did not advance				
Olanrewaju Durodola	Heavyweight	—N/a	Acosta (CUB); L 0–11	Did not advance			
Onorede Ohwarieme	Super heavyweight	—N/a	Jakšto (LTU); L 1–11	Did not advance			

== Football ==
=== Men's tournament ===
Roster

The following is the Nigeria squad in the men's football tournament of the 2008 Summer Olympics.

Head coach: Samson Siasia

No.	Pos.	Player	Date of birth (age)	Caps	Goals	Club
1	GK	Ambruse Vanzekin	14 July 1986 (aged 22)	30	0	(Nigeria Football Federation) Akwa United
2	DF	Chibuzor Okonkwo	16 December 1988 (aged 19)	8	0	(Nigeria Football Federation) Bayelsa United
4	DF	Onyekachi Apam	30 December 1986 (aged 21)	30	1	(French Football Federation) Nice
5	DF	Dele Adeleye	25 December 1988 (aged 19)	27	0	(Royal Dutch Football Association) Sparta Rotterdam
6	DF	Monday James	19 October 1986 (aged 21)	19	0	(Nigeria Football Federation) Bayelsa United
7	FW	Chinedu Obasi	1 June 1986 (aged 22)	25	6	(German Football Association) TSG 1899 Hoffenheim
8	MF	Sani Kaita	2 May 1986 (aged 22)	25	1	(Royal Dutch Football Association) Sparta Rotterdam
9	FW	Victor Obinna	25 March 1987 (aged 21)	29	11	(Italian Football Federation) Chievo
10	FW	Isaac Promise (c)	2 December 1987 (aged 20)	27	9	(Turkish Football Federation) Trabzonspor
11	FW	Solomon Okoronkwo	2 March 1987 (aged 21)	6	0	(German Football Association) Hertha BSC
12	MF	Oluwafemi Ajilore	18 January 1985 (aged 23)	3	0	(Royal Dutch Football Association) Groningen
13	DF	Olubayo Adefemi	13 August 1985 (aged 22)	27	5	(Israel Football Association) Hapoel Bnei Lod
14	FW	Peter Odemwingie*	15 July 1981 (aged 27)	25	6	(Russian Football Union) Lokomotiv Moscow
15	DF	Efe Ambrose	18 October 1988 (aged 19)	0	0	(Nigeria Football Federation) Kaduna United
16	FW	Victor Anichebe	23 April 1988 (aged 20)	5	2	(The Football Association) Everton
17	MF	Emmanuel Ekpo	20 December 1987 (aged 20)	6	3	(United States Soccer Federation) Columbus Crew
18	GK	Ikechukwu Ezenwa	16 October 1988 (aged 19)	26	0	(Nigeria Football Federation) Ocean Boys
19	MF	Oladapo Olufemi	11 May 1988 (aged 20)	12	0	(Portuguese Football Federation) Boavista

* Over-aged player.

Group play

Pos	Team	Pld	W	D	L	GF	GA	GD	Pts	Qualification
1	Nigeria	3	2	1	0	4	2	+2	7	Qualified for the quarterfinals
2	Netherlands	3	1	2	0	3	2	+1	5	Qualified for the quarterfinals
3	United States	3	1	1	1	4	4	0	4	
4	Japan	3	0	0	3	1	4	−3	0	

7 August 2008
19:45

Netherlands	0–0	Nigeria
	Report

Tianjin Olympic Center Stadium, Tianjin
Attendance: 52,390
Referee: Pablo Pozo (Chile)
10 August 2008
17:00

Nigeria	2–1	Japan
Obinna 58'; Anichebe 74'	Report	Toyoda 79'

Tianjin Olympic Center Stadium, Tianjin
Attendance: 42,592
Referee: Masoud Moradi (Iran)
13 August 2008
17:00

Nigeria	2–1	United States
Isaac 39'; Obinna 79'	Report	Kljestan 88' (pen.)

Beijing Workers' Stadium, Beijing
Attendance: 48,096
Referee: Wolfgang Stark (Germany)

Quarterfinals

16 August 2008
21:00

Nigeria	2–0	Ivory Coast
Odemwingie 44'; Obinna 82' (pen.)	Report

Qinhuangdao Olympic Sports Center Stadium, Qinhuangdao
Attendance: 28,944
Referee: Masoud Moradi (Iran)

Semi-finals

19 August 2008
18:00

Nigeria	4–1	Belgium
Adefemi 17'; Obasi 59', 72'; Okonkwo 78'	Report	Ciman 88'

Shanghai Stadium, Shanghai
Attendance: 56,312
Referee: Pablo Pozo (Chile)

Gold medal game

23 August 2008
12:00

(silver) Nigeria	0–1	Argentina (gold)
	Report	Di María 58'

Beijing National Stadium, Beijing
Attendance: 89,102
Referee: Viktor Kassai (Hungary)

Source for cards:

Team details

Nigeria

GK	1	Ambruse Vanzekin
DF	5	Dele Adeleye
DF	4	Onyekachi Apam (yellow card) 68'
DF	2	Chibuzor Okonkwo
DF	13	Olubayo Adefemi
MF	8	Sani Kaita
MF	12	Ajilore Oluwafemi
MF	11	Solomon Okoronkwo	(substituted off) 64'
FW	9	Victor Obinna (yellow card) 51'
FW	14	Peter Odemwingie
FW	10	Isaac Promise (c)	(substituted off) 70'
Substitutes:
FW	16	Victor Anichebe	(substituted on) 64'
MF	17	Emmanuel Ekpo	(substituted on) 70'
Manager:
(Nigeria) Samson Siasia

Argentina

GK	18	Sergio Romero
DF	4	Pablo Zabaleta
DF	2	Ezequiel Garay
DF	12	Nicolás Pareja
DF	3	Luciano Monzón (yellow card) 81'
MF	11	Ángel Di María	(substituted off) 88'
MF	14	Javier Mascherano
MF	5	Fernando Gago
MF	10	Juan Román Riquelme (c) (yellow card) 82'
FW	15	Lionel Messi	(substituted off) 90'
FW	16	Sergio Agüero	(substituted off) 79'
Substitutes:
MF	7	José Sosa	(substituted on) 79'
MF	8	Ever Banega	(substituted on) 88'
FW	9	Ezequiel Lavezzi	(substituted on) 90'
Manager:
(Argentina) Sergio Batista

Final rank

Silver

=== Women's tournament ===
Roster

Head coach: Joseph Ladipo

Nigeria named a squad of 18 players and 4 alternates for the tournament.

No.	Pos.	Player	Date of birth (age)	Caps	Goals	Club
1	GK	Precious Dede	18 January 1980 (aged 28)			(Nigeria Football Federation) Delta Queens
2	DF	Efioanwan Ekpo	25 January 1984 (aged 24)			(Nigeria Football Federation) Pelican Stars
3	DF	Ayisat Yusuf	6 March 1985 (aged 23)			(Football Association of Finland) KMF Kuopio
4	MF	Perpetua Nkwocha	3 January 1976 (aged 32)			(Swedish Football Association) Sunnanå SK
5	FW	Onome Ebi	8 May 1983 (aged 25)			(Nigeria Football Federation) Bayelsa Queens
6	MF	Florence Ajayi	28 April 1977 (aged 31)			(Chinese Football Association) Tianjin TEDA
7	MF	Stella Mbachu	16 April 1978 (aged 30)			(Chinese Football Association) Tianjin TEDA
8	FW	Ifeanyi Chiejine	17 May 1983 (aged 25)			(Nigeria Football Federation) Bayelsa Queens
9	MF	Sarah Michael	22 July 1990 (aged 18)			(Nigeria Football Federation) Delta Queens
10	DF	Rita Chikwelu	6 March 1988 (aged 20)			(Football Association of Finland) United Pietarsaari
11	DF	Lilian Cole	1 August 1985 (aged 23)			(Nigeria Football Federation) Delta Queens
12	FW	Cynthia Uwak	15 July 1986 (aged 22)			(Swedish Football Association) Falköpings KIK
13	FW	Christie George (captain)	10 May 1984 (aged 24)			(Nigeria Football Federation) Pelican Stars
14	MF	Faith Ikidi	28 February 1987 (aged 21)			(Swedish Football Association) Linköpings FC
15	MF	Tawa Ishola	23 December 1988 (aged 19)			(Nigeria Football Federation) Bayelsa Queens
16	DF	Ulunma Jerome	11 April 1988 (aged 20)			(Nigeria Football Federation) Rivers Angels
17	MF	Edith Eduviere	18 June 1986 (aged 22)			(Nigeria Football Federation) FCT Queens
18	GK	Tochukwu Oluehi	2 May 1987 (aged 21)			(Nigeria Football Federation) Bayelsa Queens

Group play

Pos	Team	Pld	W	D	L	GF	GA	GD	Pts	Qualification
1	Brazil	3	2	1	0	5	2	+3	7	Qualified for the quarterfinals
2	Germany	3	2	1	0	2	0	+2	7	Qualified for the quarterfinals
3	North Korea	3	1	0	2	2	3	−1	3	
4	Nigeria	3	0	0	3	1	5	−4	0	

6 August 2008
19:45

North Korea	1–0	Nigeria
Kim Kyong-hwa 27'	Report

Shenyang Olympic Stadium, Shenyang
Attendance: 24,084
Referee: Shane de Silva (Trinidad and Tobago)
9 August 2008
17:00

Nigeria	0–1	Germany
	Report	Stegemann 65'

Shenyang Olympic Stadium, Shenyang
Attendance: 19,266
Referee: Jenny Palmqvist (Sweden)
12 August 2008
17:00

Nigeria	1–3	Brazil
Nkwocha 19' (pen.)	Report	Cristiane 34', 35', 45+3'

Beijing Workers' Stadium, Beijing
Attendance: 51,112
Referee: Hong Eun-ah (Korea Republic)

== Judo ==
Vivian Yusuf represented Nigeria in Judo.

Athlete	Event	Round of 32	Round of 16	Quarterfinals	Semifinals	Repechage 1	Repechage 2	Repechage 3	Final / BM	
Athlete	Event	Opposition Result	Opposition Result	Opposition Result	Opposition Result	Opposition Result	Opposition Result	Opposition Result	Opposition Result	Rank
Vivian Yusuf	Women's −78 kg	Bye	Wollert (GER); L 0000–1000	Did not advance						

== Swimming ==
Men

Athlete	Event	Heat		Semifinal		Final	
Athlete	Event	Time	Rank	Time	Rank	Time	Rank
Yellow Yeiyah	50 m freestyle	24.00	55	Did not advance			

Women

Athlete	Event	Heat		Semifinal		Final	
Athlete	Event	Time	Rank	Time	Rank	Time	Rank
Ngozi Monu	50 m freestyle	27.39	52	Did not advance			

== Table tennis ==
Singles

Athlete	Event	Preliminary round	Round 1	Round 2	Round 3	Round 4	Quarterfinals	Semifinals	Final / BM	
Athlete	Event	Opposition Result	Opposition Result	Opposition Result	Opposition Result	Opposition Result	Opposition Result	Opposition Result	Opposition Result	Rank
Monday Merotohun	Men's singles	Zeng (TUR); L 2–4	Did not advance							
Segun Toriola	Men's singles	Zhuang (USA); W 4–3	Monteiro (POR); W 4–3	Saive (BEL); W 4–2	Oh S-E (KOR); L 3–4	Did not advance				
Bose Kaffo	Women's singles	Sang Xu (AUS); L 1–4	Did not advance							
Cecilia Offiong	Women's singles	Miao (AUS); L 0–4	Did not advance							

Team

Athlete	Event	Group round		Semifinals	Bronze playoff 1	Bronze playoff 2	Bronze medal	Final	
Athlete	Event	Opposition Result	Rank	Opposition Result	Opposition Result	Opposition Result	Opposition Result	Opposition Result	Rank
Monday Merotohun; Kazeem Nosiru; Segun Toriola	Men's team	Group D Japan; L 0 – 3 Hong Kong; L 0 – 3 Russia; W 3 – 2	3	Did not advance					
Bose Kaffo; Cecilia Offiong; Olufunke Oshonaike	Women's team	Group B Singapore; L 0 – 3 United States; L 0 – 3 Netherlands; L 0 – 3	4	Did not advance					

== Taekwondo ==
Muhammad Isah Adam and Chika Chukwumerije represented Nigeria in Taekwondo.

Athlete	Event	Round of 16	Quarterfinals	Semifinals	Repechage	Bronze Medal	Final	
Athlete	Event	Opposition Result	Opposition Result	Opposition Result	Opposition Result	Opposition Result	Opposition Result	Rank
Isah Adam Muhammad	Men's −68 kg	Islas (MEX); W 2–2 SUP	López (PER); L 0–3	Did not advance				
Chika Chukwumerije	Men's +80 kg	Nguyen V H (VIE); W 3–1	Keita (MLI); W 1–0	Nikolaidis (GRE); L 2–3	Bye	Irgashev (UZB); W 4–3	Did not advance	3rd place, bronze medalist(s)

== Weightlifting ==
Athlete	Event	Snatch		Clean & Jerk		Total	Rank
Athlete	Event	Result	Rank	Result	Rank	Total	Rank
Felix Ekpo	Men's −77 kg	143	18	182	14	325	15
Benedict Uloko	Men's −85 kg	148	16	191	13	339	13
Mariam Usman	Women's +75 kg	115	=6	150	=2	265	3rd place, bronze medalist(s)

== Wrestling ==
Key

- VT - Victory by Fall.
- PP - Decision by Points - the loser with technical points.
- PO - Decision by Points - the loser without technical points.

Men's freestyle

Athlete	Event	Qualification	Round of 16	Quarterfinal	Semifinal	Repechage 1	Repechage 2	Final / BM	
Athlete	Event	Opposition Result	Opposition Result	Opposition Result	Opposition Result	Opposition Result	Opposition Result	Opposition Result	Rank
Wilson Siewari	−120 kg	Bye	Musuľbes (SVK); L 0–3 ^{PO}	Did not advance					18

Women's freestyle

Athlete	Event	Round of 16	Quarterfinal	Semifinal	Repechage 1	Repechage 2	Final / BM	
Athlete	Event	Opposition Result	Opposition Result	Opposition Result	Opposition Result	Opposition Result	Opposition Result	Rank
Amarachi Obiajunwa	−72 kg	Bernard (USA); L 0–5 ^{VT}	Did not advance					15

== See also ==
- Nigeria at the 2006 Commonwealth Games
- Nigeria at the 2008 Summer Paralympics
- Nigeria at the 2010 Commonwealth Games
