= Daniel Manz =

German taekwondo practitioner

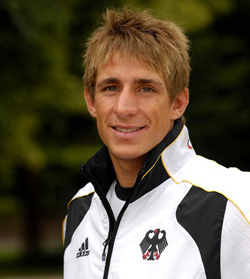

Personal information
- Nationality: Germany
- Born: 12 September 1987 (age 38) Kempten im Allgäu, Bavaria, West Germany
- Height: 1.78 m (5 ft 10 in)
- Weight: 68 kg (150 lb)

Sport
- Sport: Taekwondo
- Event: 68 kg
- Club: BSV Friedrichshafen
- Coached by: Markus Kohllöffel
Medal record
Men's taekwondo
Representing Germany
European Championships
Bronze medal – third place	2008 Rome	68 kg

Daniel Manz (born September 12, 1987 in Kempten im Allgäu, Bavaria) is a German taekwondo practitioner. He won a silver medal for the 68 kg division at the 2008 European Taekwondo Championships in Rome, Italy. Manz is also the husband of two-time Olympic taekwondo jin Sümeyye Gülec.

Manz qualified for the men's 68 kg class at the 2008 Summer Olympics in Beijing, after placing second from the European Qualification Tournament in Istanbul, Turkey. He defeated Kyrgyzstan's Rasul Abduraim in the preliminary round of sixteen, before losing out the quarterfinal match to U.S. taekwondo jin Mark López, with a score of 1–3. Because his opponent advanced further into the final match, Manz took advantage of the repechage round by defeating Afghanistan's Nesar Ahmad Bahave. He progressed to the bronze medal match, but narrowly lost the medal to Chinese Taipei's Sung Yu-Chi, with a sudden death score of 3–4.
