= Taekwondo at the 2006 Central American and Caribbean Games =

Taekwondo competition

- Location: Cartagena
- Dates: 15-30 July

The Taekwondo competition at the 2006 Central American and Caribbean Games was held in Cartagena, Colombia. The tournament was scheduled to be held from 15–30 July 2006.

== Medal summary ==
=== Men's events ===
Event	Gold	Silver	Bronze
-54 kg	Rodolfo Osomio (MEX)	Jocelyn Joseph (HAI)	Frank Diaz (CUB)
-54 kg	Rodolfo Osomio (MEX)	Jocelyn Joseph (HAI)	Raul Pacheco (PUR)
-58 kg	Gabriel Mercedes (DOM)	Guillermo Pava (COL)	Guillermo Perez (MEX)
-58 kg	Gabriel Mercedes (DOM)	Guillermo Pava (COL)	Gregory Figueroa (PUR)
-62 kg	Óscar Salazar (MEX)	Jesus Mercedes (DOM)	Osvaldo Gonzalez (PUR)
-62 kg	Óscar Salazar (MEX)	Jesus Mercedes (DOM)	Jose Rodriguez (CUB)
-67 kg	Gessler Viera (CUB)	Jefferson Sierra (HON)	Raphael Decius (HAI)
-67 kg	Gessler Viera (CUB)	Jefferson Sierra (HON)	Jose Miranda (VEN)
-72 kg	Juan Sanchez (PUR)	Luis Castiblanco (COL)	Sergio Ovas (CUB)
-72 kg	Juan Sanchez (PUR)	Luis Castiblanco (COL)	Luis Garcia (VEN)
-78 kg	Carlos Vasquez (VEN)	Chinedum Osuji (TRI)	Gabriel Castillero (PAN)
-78 kg	Carlos Vasquez (VEN)	Chinedum Osuji (TRI)	Jimmy Chery (HAI)
-84 kg	Angel Matos (CUB)	Richard Alcantara (DOM)	Miguel Ferrera (HON)
-84 kg	Angel Matos (CUB)	Richard Alcantara (DOM)	Victor Estrada (MEX)
+84 kg	Gerardo Ortiz (CUB)	Salvador Perez (MEX)	Victor Almonte (DOM)
+84 kg	Gerardo Ortiz (CUB)	Salvador Perez (MEX)	Kristopher Moitland (CRC)

=== Women's events ===
Event	Gold	Silver	Bronze
-47 kg	Dalia Contreras (VEN)	Yenitse Alvarez (CUB)	Awilda Garcia (DOM)
-47 kg	Dalia Contreras (VEN)	Yenitse Alvarez (CUB)	Zoraida Santiago (PUR)
-51 kg	Daynelli Montejo (CUB)	Alejandra Gaal (MEX)	Gladys Mora (COL)
-51 kg	Daynelli Montejo (CUB)	Alejandra Gaal (MEX)	Dagmar Diaz (PUR)
-55 kg	Yanely Labrada (CUB)	Sara Ramos (PUR)	Dinanyiris Fulcar (DOM)
-55 kg	Yanely Labrada (CUB)	Sara Ramos (PUR)	Mirla Cabello (VEN)
-59 kg	Iridia Salazar (MEX)	Yania Leon (CUB)	Saudi Arias (DOM)
-59 kg	Iridia Salazar (MEX)	Yania Leon (CUB)	Cherryl Sankar (TRI)
-63 kg	Edna Diaz (MEX)	Carla Cotto (PUR)	Disnansi Polanco (DOM)
-63 kg	Edna Diaz (MEX)	Carla Cotto (PUR)	Melvis Contreras (VEN)
-67 kg	Taimi Castellanos (CUB)	Nohemar Leal (VEN)	Lidia Hernandez (COL)
-67 kg	Taimi Castellanos (CUB)	Nohemar Leal (VEN)	Maria del Espinoza (MEX)
-72 kg	Nancy Urraca (DOM)	Mirna Hechavarria (CUB)	Evangeline Ocasio (PUR)
-72 kg	Nancy Urraca (DOM)	Mirna Hechavarria (CUB)	Frances Maldonado (MEX)
+72 kg	Ineabelle Díaz (PUR)	Sulayyil Madrigal (MEX)	Candy Lorenzo (DOM)
+72 kg	Ineabelle Díaz (PUR)	Sulayyil Madrigal (MEX)	Annelica Gonzalez (CUB)

== Medal table ==
* Host nation (Colombia)

Rank	Nation	Gold	Silver	Bronze	Total
1	Cuba	6	3	4	13
2	Mexico	4	3	4	11
3	Dominican Republic	2	2	6	10
3	Puerto Rico	2	2	6	10
5	Venezuela	2	1	4	7
6	Colombia*	0	2	2	4
7	Haiti	0	1	2	3
8	Honduras	0	1	1	2
8	Trinidad and Tobago	0	1	1	2
10	Costa Rica	0	0	1	1
10	Panama	0	0	1	1
Totals (11 entries)		16	16	32	64
