= Anton Fokin =

Uzbekistani artistic gymnast (born 1982)

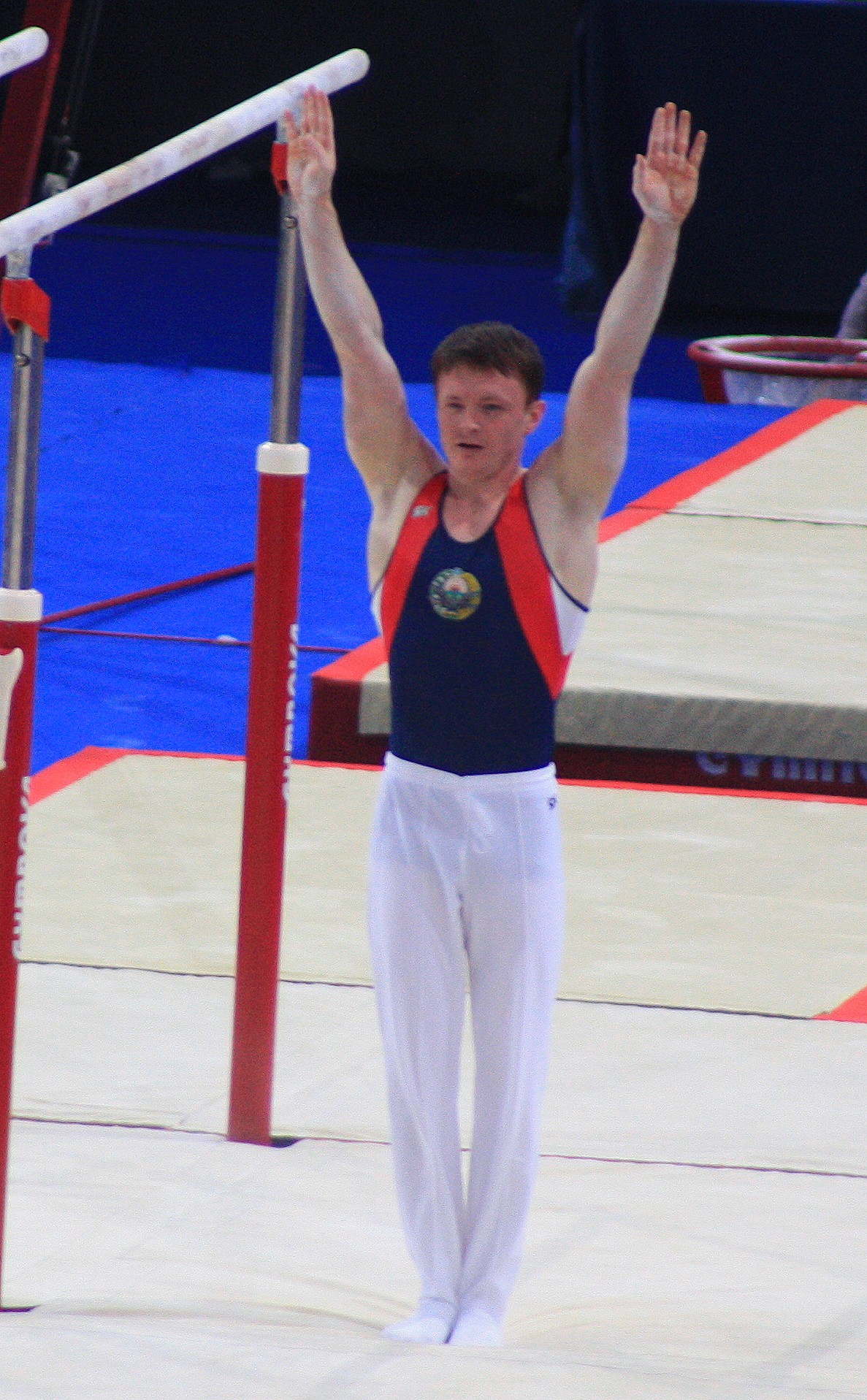
- Fokin in 2010

Personal information
- Full name: Anton Viktorovich Fokin
- Born: November 13, 1982 (age 43) Tashkent, Uzbek SSR, Soviet Union
- Height: 169 cm (5 ft 7 in)

Gymnastics career
- Discipline: Men's artistic gymnastics
- Country represented: Uzbekistan
- Club: CSKA
- Head coach: Shukhrat Mamadaliyev
Medal record
Representing Uzbekistan
Olympic Games
Bronze medal – third place	2008 Beijing	Parallel bars
World Championships
Bronze medal – third place	2007 Stuttgart	Parallel bars
Asian Games
Silver medal – second place	2010 Guangzhou	Parallel Bars
Silver medal – second place	2014 Incheon	Parallel bars

Anton Viktorovich Fokin (born November 13, 1982) is an Uzbek artistic gymnast who represented Uzbekistan at the 2008 Summer Olympics, where he won a bronze medal on the parallel bars. He also won the bronze medal on the parallel bars at the 2007 World Artistic Gymnastics Championships.
