= Gymnastics at the 2010 Asian Games – Men's parallel bars =

Men's parallel bars at the 2010 Asian Games
- Venue: Asian Games Town Gymnasium
- Date: 13–17 November 2010
- Competitors: 66 from 19 nations

Medalists
| gold medal | Feng Zhe | China |
| silver medal | Anton Fokin | Uzbekistan |
| bronze medal | Ildar Valeyev | Kazakhstan |

The men's parallel bars competition at the 2010 Asian Games in Guangzhou, China was held on 13 and 17 November 2010 at the Asian Games Town Gymnasium.

== Schedule ==
All times are China Standard Time (UTC+08:00)

| Date | Time | Event |
|---|---|---|
| Saturday, 13 November 2010 | 09:30 | Qualification |
| Wednesday, 17 November 2010 | 20:20 | Final |

== Results ==
=== Qualification ===
| Rank | Athlete | Score |
|---|---|---|
| 1 | Feng Zhe (CHN) | 15.950 |
| 2 | Teng Haibin (CHN) | 15.500 |
| 3 | Anton Fokin (UZB) | 15.500 |
| 4 | Shun Kuwahara (JPN) | 15.450 |
| 5 | Ildar Valeyev (KAZ) | 15.400 |
| 6 | Yoo Won-chul (KOR) | 15.300 |
| 7 | Lü Bo (CHN) | 15.250 |
| 8 | Phạm Phước Hưng (VIE) | 15.250 |
| 9 | Zhang Chenglong (CHN) | 15.200 |
| 10 | Yan Mingyong (CHN) | 15.100 |
| 11 | Kyoichi Watanabe (JPN) | 15.050 |
| 12 | Nguyễn Hà Thanh (VIE) | 14.850 |
| 13 | Hisashi Mizutori (JPN) | 14.750 |
| 14 | Ryotaka Deguchi (JPN) | 14.550 |
| 15 | Hoàng Cường (VIE) | 14.550 |
| 16 | Stepan Gorbachev (KAZ) | 14.500 |
| 17 | Shek Wai Hung (HKG) | 14.450 |
| 18 | Kim Soo-myun (KOR) | 14.450 |
| 19 | Takuya Nakase (JPN) | 14.450 |
| 20 | Kim Ji-hoon (KOR) | 14.350 |
| 21 | Ravshanbek Osimov (UZB) | 14.250 |
| 22 | Sin Seob (KOR) | 14.000 |
| 23 | Hsu Ping-chien (TPE) | 13.950 |
| 24 | Yernar Yerimbetov (KAZ) | 13.950 |
| 25 | Kittipong Yudee (THA) | 13.900 |
| 26 | Younes Zeighami (IRI) | 13.900 |
| 27 | Weena Chokpaoumpai (THA) | 13.850 |
| 28 | Đặng Nam (VIE) | 13.750 |
| 29 | Huang Che-kuei (TPE) | 13.650 |
| 30 | Mahmood Al-Sadi (QAT) | 13.650 |
| 31 | Otabek Masharipov (UZB) | 13.550 |
| 32 | Ehsan Khodadadi (IRI) | 13.550 |
| 33 | Yang Hak-seon (KOR) | 13.550 |
| 34 | Rartchawat Kaewpanya (THA) | 13.450 |
| 35 | Chen Chih-yu (TPE) | 13.450 |
| 36 | Mohammad Ramezanpour (IRI) | 13.350 |
| 37 | Ivan Olushev (UZB) | 13.250 |
| 38 | David-Jonathan Chan (SIN) | 13.200 |
| 39 | Lum Wan Foong (MAS) | 13.150 |
| 40 | Amir Azami (IRI) | 13.100 |
| 41 | Thitipong Sukdee (THA) | 13.050 |
| 42 | Eduard Shaulov (KAZ) | 13.050 |
| 43 | Devesh Kumar (IND) | 13.050 |
| 44 | Ahmed Al-Dyani (QAT) | 13.000 |
| 45 | Trương Minh Sang (VIE) | 12.800 |
| 46 | Tu Yu-chen (TPE) | 12.750 |
| 47 | Hadi Khanarinejad (IRI) | 12.750 |
| 48 | Stanislav Valiyev (KAZ) | 12.700 |
| 49 | Mohammed Sharif (YEM) | 12.550 |
| 50 | Ng Kiu Chung (HKG) | 12.450 |
| 51 | Maxim Petrishko (KAZ) | 12.300 |
| 52 | Mayank Srivastava (SRI) | 12.300 |
| 53 | Ismail Shabi (KSA) | 12.250 |
| 54 | Ali Saadi (IRQ) | 12.050 |
| 55 | Shinoj Muliyil (IND) | 12.050 |
| 56 | Lu Yan-ting (TPE) | 11.950 |
| 57 | Ashish Kumar (IND) | 11.800 |
| 58 | Ganbatyn Erdenebold (MGL) | 11.750 |
| 59 | Suriyen Chanduang (THA) | 11.600 |
| 60 | Tharindu Pathmaperuma (SRI) | 11.400 |
| 61 | Abdulaziz Al-Johani (KSA) | 11.350 |
| 62 | Habib Al-Swailah (KSA) | 11.300 |
| 63 | Alok Ranjan (IND) | 11.250 |
| 64 | Nadika Cooray (SRI) | 11.200 |
| 65 | Ali Al-Khwaher (KSA) | 11.050 |
| 66 | Jasem Gazwi (KSA) | 11.000 |

=== Final ===
| Rank | Athlete | Score |
|---|---|---|
| 1st place, gold medalist(s) | Feng Zhe (CHN) | 15.650 |
| 2nd place, silver medalist(s) | Anton Fokin (UZB) | 15.350 |
| 3rd place, bronze medalist(s) | Ildar Valeyev (KAZ) | 15.300 |
| 4 | Yoo Won-chul (KOR) | 15.275 |
| 5 | Kyoichi Watanabe (JPN) | 15.000 |
| 6 | Shun Kuwahara (JPN) | 14.525 |
| 7 | Teng Haibin (CHN) | 13.875 |
| 8 | Phạm Phước Hưng (VIE) | 13.675 |
