= Taekwondo at the 2008 Summer Olympics – Men's 58 kg =

Taekwondo competition

Men's 58 kg at the Games of the XXIX Olympiad
- Venue: Beijing Science and Technology University Gymnasium
- Date: 20 August 2008
- Competitors: 16 from 16 nations

Medalists
1st place, gold medalist(s)		Guillermo Pérez	Mexico
2nd place, silver medalist(s)		Gabriel Mercedes	Dominican Republic
3rd place, bronze medalist(s)		Chu Mu-Yen	Chinese Taipei
3rd place, bronze medalist(s)		Rohullah Nikpai	Afghanistan

The men's 58 kg competition in taekwondo at the 2008 Summer Olympics in Beijing took place on August 20 at the Beijing Science and Technology University Gymnasium.

== Competition format ==
The main bracket consisted of a single elimination tournament, culminating in the gold medal match. Two bronze medals were awarded at the taekwondo competitions. A repechage was used to determine the bronze medal winners. Every competitor who lost to one of the two finalists competed in the repechage, another single-elimination competition. Each semifinal loser faced the last remaining repechage competitor from the opposite half of the bracket in a bronze medal match.

== Schedule ==
All times are China standard time (UTC+8)

Date	Time	Round
Wednesday, 20 August 2008	11:00; 16:00; 17:30; 20:30	Preliminary Round; Quarterfinals; Semifinals; Final

== Qualifying Athletes ==
Athlete	Country
Guillermo Pérez	Mexico
Michael Harvey	Great Britain
Rohullah Nikpai	Afghanistan
Levent Tuncat	Germany
Chutchawal Khawlaor	Thailand
Jean Moloise Ogoudjobi	Benin
Tshomlee Go	Philippines
Ryan Carneli	Australia
Chu Mu-Yen	Chinese Taipei
Dickson Wamwiri	Kenya
Gabriel Mercedes	Dominican Republic
Pedro Póvoa	Portugal
Alfonso Martinez	Belize
Juan Antonio Ramos	Spain
Reza Naderian	Iran
Márcio Wenceslau	Brazil

== Results ==
Legend

- PTG — Won by points gap
- SUP — Won by superiority
- OT — Won on over time (Golden Point)

=== Main bracket ===
Preliminary round
1	Guillermo Pérez (MEX)	3
16	Michael Harvey (GBR)	2
8	Rohullah Nikpai (AFG)	4
9	Levent Tuncat (GER)	3
5	Chutchawal Khawlaor (THA)	4
12	Jean Moloise Ogoudjobi (BEN)	2
4	Tshomlee Go (PHI)	0
13	Ryan Carneli (AUS)	1
6	Chu Mu-Yen (TPE)	7
11	Dickson Wamwiri (KEN)	0
3	Gabriel Mercedes (DOM)	3
14	Pedro Póvoa (POR)	0
7	Alfonso Martínez (BIZ)	1
10	Juan Antonio Ramos (ESP)	2
2	Reza Naderian (IRI)	1
15	Márcio Wenceslau (BRA)	2

Quarterfinals
Guillermo Pérez (MEX)	2
Rohullah Nikpai (AFG)	1
Chutchawal Khawlaor (THA)	2
Ryan Carneli (AUS)	0
Chu Mu-Yen (TPE)	2
Gabriel Mercedes (DOM)	3
Juan Antonio Ramos (ESP)	3
Márcio Wenceslau (BRA)	2

Semifinals
Guillermo Pérez (MEX)	3
Chutchawal Khawlaor (THA)	1
Gabriel Mercedes (DOM)	3
Juan Antonio Ramos (ESP)	2

Gold medal match
Guillermo Pérez (MEX)	(SUP); 1
Gabriel Mercedes (DOM)	1

=== Repechage ===
Round 1
Chu Mu-Yen (TPE)	1
Pedro Póvoa (POR)	−1
Michael Harvey (GBR)	1
Rohullah Nikpai (AFG)	3

Bronze medal match
Chu Mu-Yen (TPE)	4
Chutchawal Khawlaor (THA)	2
Juan Antonio Ramos (ESP)	1
Rohullah Nikpai (AFG)	4
