= 2007 Oceania Taekwondo Qualification Tournament =

Aekwondo competition

The Oceania Qualification Tournament for the Taekwondo at the 2008 Summer Olympics was held in Noumea, New Caledonia on December 1, 2007. The winner of each event qualified for the Olympics.

== Men's ==
=== Flyweight (-58kg) ===
December 1

Quarterfinals		Semifinals		Final
		Sam Jason (MHL)	WO
Thomas Tawan (PNG)	5	Thomas Tawan (PNG)
Sameer Ali (FIJ)	1			Thomas Tawan (PNG)	0
				Ryan Carneli (AUS)	7
		Nikko Pajarillaga (GUM)	0
		Ryan Carneli (AUS)	7

=== Featherweight (-68kg) ===
December 1

Semi-finals
(Vanuatu) Steve Vasso	0
(New Zealand) Logan Campbell	7
(Papua New Guinea) Ivan Kassman	2
(Tonga) Paula Tatafu	2SUP

Final
(New Zealand) Logan Campbell	8
(Tonga) Paula Tatafu	1

=== Welterweight (-80kg) ===
December 1

Final
(Marshall Islands) Anju Jason	4
(Samoa) Simon Ah Him	2

=== Heavyweight (+80kg) ===
December 1

SemiFinals		Final
		Piata Taufatofa (TGA)	1
Matthew Beach (NZL)	12	Matthew Beach (NZL)	5
Kaino Thomsen (SAM)	4

== Women's Taekwondo ==
=== Flyweight (-49kg) ===
December 1

Final
(New Zealand) Andrea Kilday	10
(Papua New Guinea) Theresa Tona	2

=== Featherweight (-57kg) ===
December 1

Final
(New Zealand) Hye Young Cheong
BYE

=== Welterweight (-67kg) ===
December 1

Final
(Australia) Tina Morgan
BYE

=== Heavyweight (+67kg) ===
December 1

Final
(Australia) Amy Ash	8
(Fiji) Elizabeth Bernard	1
