= Gymnastics at the 2008 Summer Olympics – Men's parallel bars =

Olympic gymnastics event

Men's parallel bars at the Games of the XXIX Olympiad
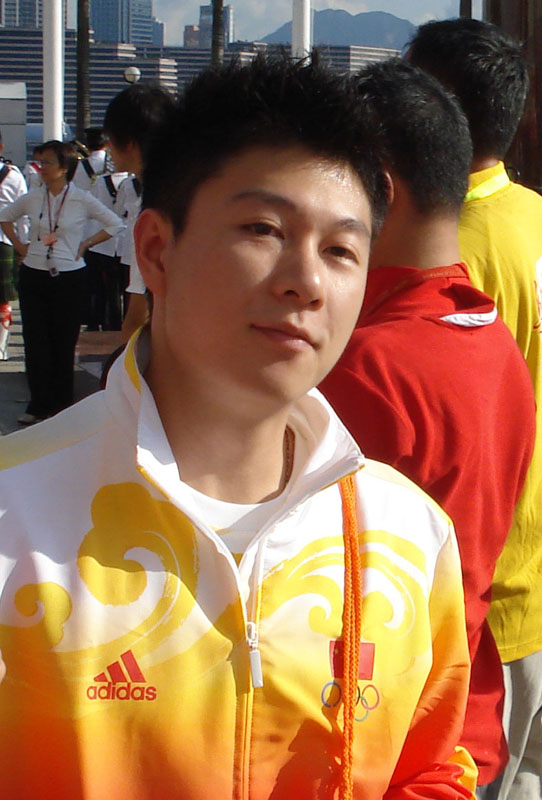
- Li Xiaopeng (2008)
- Venue: Beijing National Indoor Stadium
- Dates: 9 August (qualifying); 19 August (final)
- Competitors: 75 from 27 nations
- Winning score: 16.425

Medalists
1st place, gold medalist(s)		Li Xiaopeng; China
2nd place, silver medalist(s)		Yoo Won-Chul; South Korea
3rd place, bronze medalist(s)		Anton Fokin; Uzbekistan

The men's parallel bars competition at the 2008 Summer Olympics was held on August 9 and 19 at the Beijing National Indoor Stadium. The eight competitors (with a maximum of two per nation) with the highest scores in qualifying proceeded to the men's parallel bars finals. There, each gymnast performed again; the scores from the final round (ignoring qualification) determined the final ranking. There were 75 competitors from 27 nations that competed on the parallel bars, with nations in the team event entering up to 5 gymnasts while other nations could enter up to 2. The event was won by Li Xiaopeng of China, the first (and, as of the 2016 Games, only) man to win three medals in the parallel bars as well as the first (and, as of the 2016 Games, only) man to win two non-consecutive gold medals in the same apparatus. Yoo Won-Chul of South Korea took silver. Anton Fokin won Uzbekistan's first parallel bars medal in its debut as an independent nation.

== Background ==
This was the 22nd appearance of the event, which is one of the five apparatus events held every time there were apparatus events at the Summer Olympics (no apparatus events were held in 1900, 1908, 1912, or 1920). Four of the eight finalists from 2004 returned: gold medalist Valeriy Honcharov of Ukraine, silver medalist Hiroyuki Tomita of Japan, bronze medalist Li Xiaopeng of China, and sixth-place finisher Yann Cucherat of France. Mitja Petkovšek of Slovenia had won the 2005 and 2007 world championships, sharing the latter with Kim Dae-Eun of South Korea; Yang Wei of China was victorious in 2006.

Uzbekistan and Venezuela each made their debut in the men's parallel bars. The United States made its 20th appearance, most of any nation; the Americans had missed only the inaugural 1896 event and the boycotted 1980 Games.

== Qualification ==
Qualification for the men's artistic gymnastics in 2008 was based entirely on the 2007 World Artistic Gymnastics Championships. The top 12 teams at the World Championships could send a full team of 6 gymnasts to the Olympics. The next 3 teams (#13 through #15) could send 2 gymnasts. The 3 teams after that (#16 through #18) could send 1 gymnast. The next 7 individual gymnasts (only from nations without any qualified gymnasts yet) and apparatus gold medal winners also qualified. The FIG Executive Board made invitational selections to ensure host country and continental representation and the Tripartite Commission made an invitation. The quota of 98 gymnasts was then filled through additional individual gymnasts.

== Competition format ==
The 1996 gymnastics competition had introduced the "7–6–5" format, in which each team had 7 members, designated 6 for each apparatus, and had 5 count for team scores. In 2000, this was reduced across the board to a "6–5–4" format; the 2008 competition kept this format. Further, while in 1996 all 7 team members could compete on each apparatus for individual purposes, since 2000 only the 5 designated for that apparatus competed. The 2000 competition had also eliminated the compulsory exercises; only voluntary exercises were done on each apparatus. The qualifying round scores were used for qualification for the team all-around, individual all-around, and apparatus finals.

The top eight gymnasts, with a limit of two per nation, advanced to the final. Non-finalists were ranked 9th through 75th based on preliminary score. The preliminary score had no effect on the final; once the eight finalists were selected, their ranking depended only on the final exercise.

Scoring in artistic gymnastics under the Code of Points is based on two separate scores that are then combined in order to come to the final score. The D score measures the difficulty of each element (and combinations of elements) within the routine, while the E score evaluates the performance, ie, the "execution, composition and artistry" of the routine.

== Schedule ==
All times are China Standard Time (UTC+8)

Date	Time	Round
Saturday, 9 August 2008	12:00	Qualifying
Monday, 19 August 2008	18:00	Final

== Results ==
=== Qualifying ===
The top 8 gymnasts, with a limit of 2 per nation, qualified for the final.

=== Final ===
Rank	Gymnast	Nation	D Score	E Score	Pen.	Total
1st place, gold medalist(s)	Li Xiaopeng	China	6.900	9.550		16.450
2nd place, silver medalist(s)	Yoo Won-Chul	South Korea	7.000	9.250		16.250
3rd place, bronze medalist(s)	Anton Fokin	Uzbekistan	6.800	9.400		16.200
4	Fabian Hambüchen	Germany	6.900	9.075		15.975
5	Mitja Petkovšek	Slovenia	6.800	8.925		15.725
6	Huang Xu	China	7.000	8.700		15.700
7	Yang Tae-Young	South Korea	7.000	8.650		15.650
8	Nikolay Kryukov	Russia	6.700	8.450		15.150
