= Dickson Wamwiri =

Kenyan taekwondo practitioner (1984–2020)

P. Dickson Wamwiri
Personal information
- Full name: Pazuka Dickson Wamwiri Wanjiku
- Nationality: Kenya
- Born: 24 December 1984 Moi’s Bridge, Kenya
- Died: 6 September 2020 (aged 35) Nairobi, Kenya
- Height: 1.64 m (5 ft 4 1/2 in)
- Weight: 56 kg (123 lb)

Sport
- Sport: Taekwondo
- Event: 58 kg
Medal record
Men's taekwondo
Representing Kenya
African Games
Gold medal – first place	2007 Algiers	Flyweight
Bronze medal – third place	2003 Abuja	Flyweight
Bronze medal – third place	2011 Maputo	Flyweight

P. Dickson Wamwiri Wanjiku (24 December 1984 – 6 September 2020) was a Kenyan taekwondo practitioner. Wamwiri qualified for the men's 58 kg class at the 2008 Summer Olympics in Beijing, after winning the championship title from the African Qualification Tournament in Tripoli, Libya. He lost his preliminary match to defending world and Olympic champion Chu Mu-yen of Chinese Taipei, with a final score of 0–7.
