= Elizabeth Bernard =

American missionary

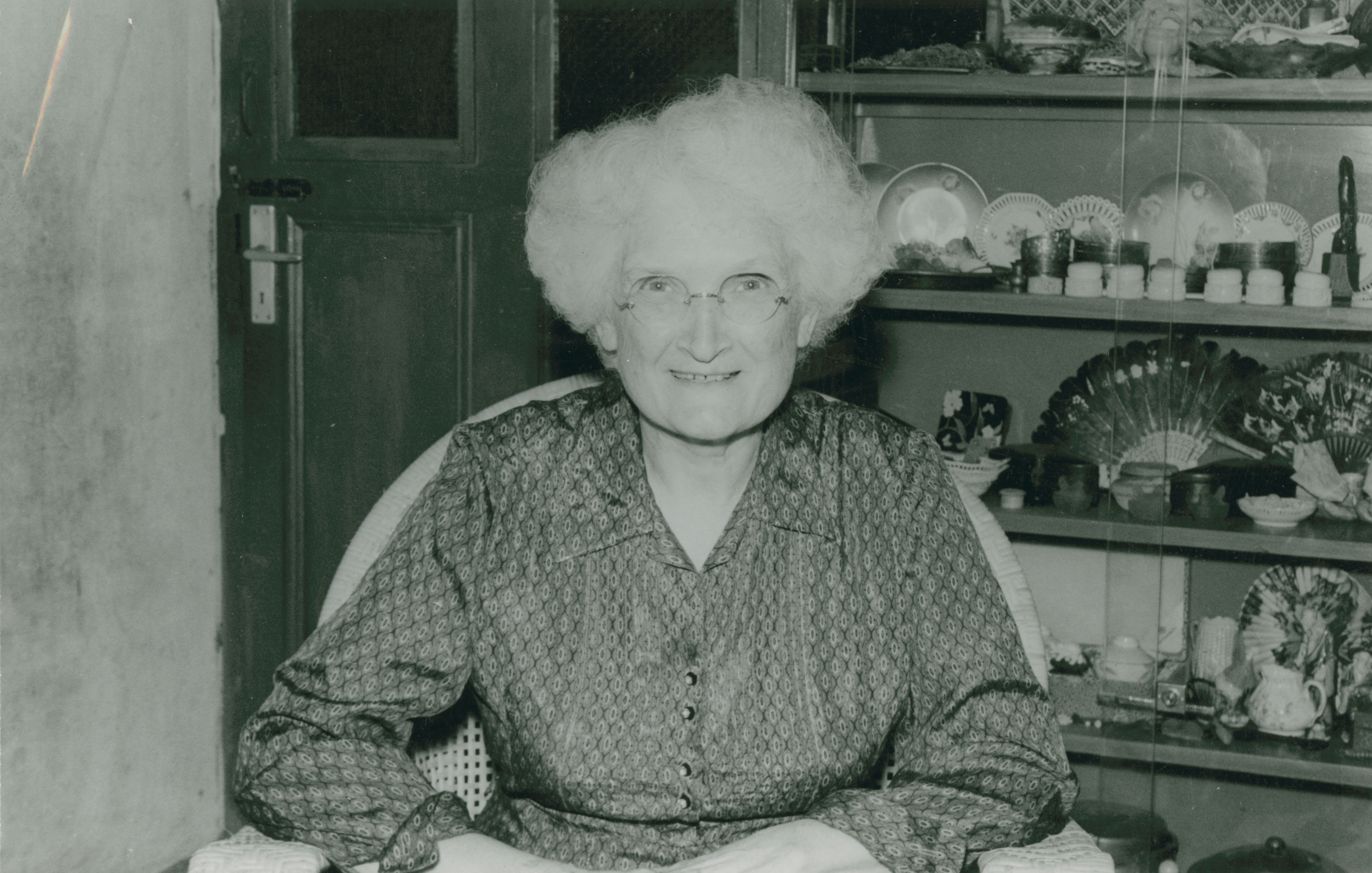
- Elizabeth C. Bernard, Hong Kong, China, ca.1959-1969
- Born: October 10, 1890; DeSoto, Texas
- Died: December 12, 1971 (aged 81); Hong Kong

Elizabeth Bernard (October 10, 1890 – December 12, 1971) was an American missionary for the Churches of Christ, known for her missionary work with blind children in Asia.

== Early life and education ==
Born in DeSoto, Texas, Bernard sought training as a nurse at the College of Industrial Arts in Denton, Texas.

== Career ==
Upon completing her education, she joined the United States Army as a nurse in 1918, but was discharged due to poor eyesight after two years of service. Bernard then spent three years in schools across America teaching blind children, before moving to Guangzhou, China in 1933 to pursue missionary work. She was able to do this due to a government pension.

World War II disrupted Bernard's missionary work in Asia, causing her to flee or relocate several times. Prior to the break out of the Second Sino-Japanese War, Bernardel fled in 1938 from Guangzhou to Hong Kong. She moved once more to Macau before settling in Guilin. After spending some time in India, Bernard returned to the United States in 1944, during which time she attended the Alhambra Church of Christ.

After World War II ended, Bernard was able to return to Guangzhou in 1947 and repair the Canton Bible School damaged during the war. She began caring for orphans, but the communist revolution forced her to leave Guangzhou and settle in Hong Kong, taking several orphans with her. By 1949, Bernard was the only Churches of Christ missionary in Hong Kong and she worked alone until 1959 when additional missionaries were sent on short-term assignments. Working with others from the American Churches of Christ, Bernard reestablished churches and preaching schools, thus reviving the Hong Kong mission. She returned to the United States in 1967 and then made one final trip to Hong Kong in 1970.

== Death ==
Bernard died on December 12, 1971, and was buried in Happy Valley on Hong Kong Island.
