= 2007 World Taekwondo Championships =

Taekwondo competition

- Venue: Changping Gymnasium
- Location: Beijing, China
- Dates: 18–22 May 2007

Champions
- Men: South Korea
- Women: South Korea

The 2007 World Taekwondo Championships were the 18th edition of the World Taekwondo Championships, and were held in Beijing, China from 18 to 22 May 2007.

== Medal table ==
* Host nation (China)

Rank	Nation	Gold	Silver	Bronze	Total
1	South Korea	4	4	4	12
2	China*	2	0	1	3
2	Spain	2	0	1	3
4	Chinese Taipei	1	1	2	4
5	Croatia	1	1	1	3
5	Mexico	1	1	1	3
7	Turkey	1	1	0	2
8	United States	1	0	3	4
9	Canada	1	0	1	2
9	Cuba	1	0	1	2
11	Mali	1	0	0	1
12	Thailand	0	3	1	4
13	Iran	0	2	1	3
14	Afghanistan	0	1	0	1
14	Azerbaijan	0	1	0	1
14	France	0	1	0	1
17	Kazakhstan	0	0	3	3
17	Netherlands	0	0	3	3
19	Brazil	0	0	2	2
20	Dominican Republic	0	0	1	1
20	Egypt	0	0	1	1
20	Germany	0	0	1	1
20	Hungary	0	0	1	1
20	Italy	0	0	1	1
20	Morocco	0	0	1	1
20	Norway	0	0	1	1
Totals (26 entries)		16	16	32	64

== Medal summary ==
=== Men ===
Event	Gold	Silver	Bronze
Finweight (−54 kg)	Choi Yeon-ho; South Korea	Chutchawal Khawlaor; Thailand	Aslan Batykulov; Kazakhstan
Finweight (−54 kg)	Choi Yeon-ho; South Korea	Chutchawal Khawlaor; Thailand	Rodolfo Osornio; Mexico
Flyweight (−58 kg)	Juan Antonio Ramos; Spain	Guillermo Pérez; Mexico	Tamer Bayoumi; Egypt
Flyweight (−58 kg)	Juan Antonio Ramos; Spain	Guillermo Pérez; Mexico	Lee Sun-jae; South Korea
Bantamweight (−62 kg)	Filip Grgić; Croatia	Nacha Punthong; Thailand	Rafik Zohri; Netherlands
Bantamweight (−62 kg)	Filip Grgić; Croatia	Nacha Punthong; Thailand	Marcel Wenceslau; Brazil
Featherweight (−67 kg)	Gessler Viera; Cuba	Omid Gholamzadeh; Iran	Song Myeong-seob; South Korea
Featherweight (−67 kg)	Gessler Viera; Cuba	Omid Gholamzadeh; Iran	Dennis Bekkers; Netherlands
Lightweight (−72 kg)	Sung Yu-chi; Chinese Taipei	Nesar Ahmad Bahave; Afghanistan	Tommy Mollet; Netherlands
Lightweight (−72 kg)	Sung Yu-chi; Chinese Taipei	Nesar Ahmad Bahave; Afghanistan	Hadi Saei; Iran
Welterweight (−78 kg)	Steven López; United States	Jang Chang-ha; South Korea	Sébastien Michaud; Canada
Welterweight (−78 kg)	Steven López; United States	Jang Chang-ha; South Korea	Balázs Tóth; Hungary
Middleweight (−84 kg)	Bahri Tanrıkulu; Turkey	Tavakkul Bayramov; Azerbaijan	Park Min-soo; South Korea
Middleweight (−84 kg)	Bahri Tanrıkulu; Turkey	Tavakkul Bayramov; Azerbaijan	Arman Chilmanov; Kazakhstan
Heavyweight (+84 kg)	Daba Modibo Keïta; Mali	Morteza Rostami; Iran	Nam Yun-bae; South Korea
Heavyweight (+84 kg)	Daba Modibo Keïta; Mali	Morteza Rostami; Iran	Abdelkader Zrouri; Morocco

=== Women ===
Event	Gold	Silver	Bronze
Finweight (−47 kg)	Wu Jingyu; China	Yaowapa Boorapolchai; Thailand	Yang Shu-chun; Chinese Taipei
Finweight (−47 kg)	Wu Jingyu; China	Yaowapa Boorapolchai; Thailand	Charlotte Craig; United States
Flyweight (−51 kg)	Brigitte Yagüe; Spain	Ana Zaninović; Croatia	Yajaira Peguero; Dominican Republic
Flyweight (−51 kg)	Brigitte Yagüe; Spain	Ana Zaninović; Croatia	Nazgul Tazhigulova; Kazakhstan
Bantamweight (−55 kg)	Jung Jin-hee; South Korea	Tseng Yi-hsuan; Chinese Taipei	Yaimara Rosario; Cuba
Bantamweight (−55 kg)	Jung Jin-hee; South Korea	Tseng Yi-hsuan; Chinese Taipei	Andrea Rica; Spain
Featherweight (−59 kg)	Lee Sung-hye; South Korea	Hamide Bıkçın; Turkey	Diana López; United States
Featherweight (−59 kg)	Lee Sung-hye; South Korea	Hamide Bıkçın; Turkey	Watcharaporn Dongnoi; Thailand
Lightweight (−63 kg)	Karine Sergerie; Canada	Park Hye-mi; South Korea	Mona Solheim; Norway
Lightweight (−63 kg)	Karine Sergerie; Canada	Park Hye-mi; South Korea	Nia Abdallah; United States
Welterweight (−67 kg)	Hwang Kyung-seon; South Korea	Gwladys Épangue; France	Helena Fromm; Germany
Welterweight (−67 kg)	Hwang Kyung-seon; South Korea	Gwladys Épangue; France	Sandra Šarić; Croatia
Middleweight (−72 kg)	María Espinoza; Mexico	Lee In-jong; South Korea	Luo Wei; China
Middleweight (−72 kg)	María Espinoza; Mexico	Lee In-jong; South Korea	Natália Falavigna; Brazil
Heavyweight (+72 kg)	Chen Zhong; China	Han Jin-sun; South Korea	Tsui Fang-hsuan; Chinese Taipei
Heavyweight (+72 kg)	Chen Zhong; China	Han Jin-sun; South Korea	Daniela Castrignano; Italy

== Team ranking ==
=== Men ===
Rank	Team	Points
1	South Korea	53
2	Iran	45
3	Spain	39
4	Chinese Taipei	34
5	Mexico	33
6	Thailand	33
7	United States	31
8	Azerbaijan	30
9	Turkey	29
10	Kazakhstan	28

=== Women ===
Rank	Team	Points
1	South Korea	73
2	China	45
3	Canada	36
4	Spain	35
5	Chinese Taipei	35
6	Mexico	34
7	Croatia	29
8	United States	28
9	Turkey	27
10	Brazil	26
