= Ryan Carneli =

Australian taekwondo practitioner

Personal information
- Nationality: Australia
- Born: 11 October 1985 (age 40) Melbourne, Victoria, Australia
- Height: 1.70 m (5 ft 7 in)
- Weight: 58 kg (128 lb)

Sport
- Sport: Taekwondo
- Event: 58 kg
- Club: Fighting Lyons Taekwondo
- Coached by: Daniel Trenton

Ryan Carneli (born 11 October 1985 in Melbourne, Victoria) is an Australian taekwondo practitioner. Carneli qualified for the men's 58 kg class at the 2008 Summer Olympics in Beijing, after winning the Oceania Qualification Tournament in Noumea, New Caledonia. He defeated Philippines' Tshomlee Go in the preliminary round of sixteen, before losing out the quarterfinal match to Thailand's Chutchawal Khawlaor, who was able to score two points at the end of the game.
