= Jean Moloise Ogoudjobi =

Beninese taekwondo practitioner (born 1985)

M.A. Jean Moloise Ogoudjobi (born 23 October 1985) is a Beninese taekwondo practitioner.

He competed in the men's 58 kg taekwondo event at the 2008 Summer Olympics but was eliminated in the first round by losing to Chutchawal Khawlaor of Thailand 4-2.
