= Matthew Beach =

New Zealand taekwondo practitioner

Personal information
- Full name: Matthew Francis Beach
- Nationality: New Zealand
- Born: 22 December 1977 (age 48) Guildford, Surrey, England
- Height: 1.92 m (6 ft 3 1/2 in)
- Weight: 94 kg (207 lb)

Sport
- Sport: Taekwondo
- Event: +80 kg

Matthew Francis Beach (born 22 December 1977) is a New Zealand taekwondo practitioner of British origin. Beach qualified for the men's heavyweight division (+80 kg) at the 2008 Summer Olympics in Beijing, after winning the Oceanian Qualification Tournament in Nouméa, New Caledonia. He lost the preliminary round of sixteen match to China's Liu Xiaobo, with a score of 1–4. Beach currently resides in Wellington, New Zealand, where he is employed by SBS Wealth Service as the head of Client Care.
