= Logan Campbell (taekwondo) =

New Zealand taekwondo practitioner

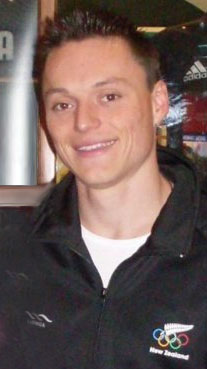

Personal information
- Born: 7 June 1986 (age 40) Auckland, New Zealand
- Website: www.logancampbell.co.nz

Logan Campbell (born 7 June 1986, in Auckland) is a New Zealand taekwondo practitioner who competed at the 2008 Beijing Olympics and 2012 London Olympics.

Campbell was first attracted to taekwondo as a child after watching The Karate Kid but initially struggled at the sport. He kept at it and won his first international tournament at the age of 13. He qualified for the 2005 Taekwondo World Championships and in 2006 won the WTF-Oceania Championships coming back from being down 3–0 in the final. In order to take part internationally he was funded by his parents but shortly before the 2008 Olympics did manage to get some sponsorship.

Campbell qualified for the Olympics after winning the Featherweight (under 68 kg) category at the 2007 Oceania Qualification Tournament and won the Korean Open in July 2008. He broke his arm seven weeks before the Olympics, but it healed in time for him to participate. However he was drawn against the 2007 World Champion Sung Yu-chi in the first round, and lost to him 4–0.

In July 2009 Campbell and his business partner, opened a brothel in Auckland so he could finance his training towards his aim of competing at the 2012 Olympics in London, England. His 2008 Olympic campaign had cost $150,000 and Campbell hoped to raise the $300,000 that he estimated he would need for the 2012 Olympics. Prostitution in registered brothels is legal in New Zealand and Campbell described what he was opening as a high class escort agency. He was backed by his parents who had previously funded his Taekwondo career, with his father having taken two jobs to fund Campbell's international competition. Campbell planned to take 2 years off from taekwondo in order to work full-time before returning to training in 2011; however it was reported that his choice of business might count against him in being selected for the 2012 Olympics.

At the 2012 Games he was knocked out in his first fight 6–10 by Hryhorii Husarov.
