= Burak Hasan =

Australian taekwondo practitioner

Personal information
- Nationality: Australia
- Born: 4 July 1985 (age 41) Melbourne, Victoria, Australia
- Height: 1.77 m (5 ft 9 1/2 in)
- Weight: 68 kg (150 lb)

Sport
- Sport: Taekwondo
- Event: 68 kg
- Club: Olympic Taekwondo Centre
- Coached by: Daniel Trenton

Burak Hasan (born 4 July 1985 in Melbourne, Victoria) is an Australian taekwondo practitioner. Hasan qualified for the men's 68 kg class at the 2008 Summer Olympics in Beijing, after placing third from the World Qualification Tournament in Manchester, England. He lost the preliminary round of sixteen match to Peru's Peter López, with a score of 1–3.
