= Steven López =

American taekwondo practitioner and coach

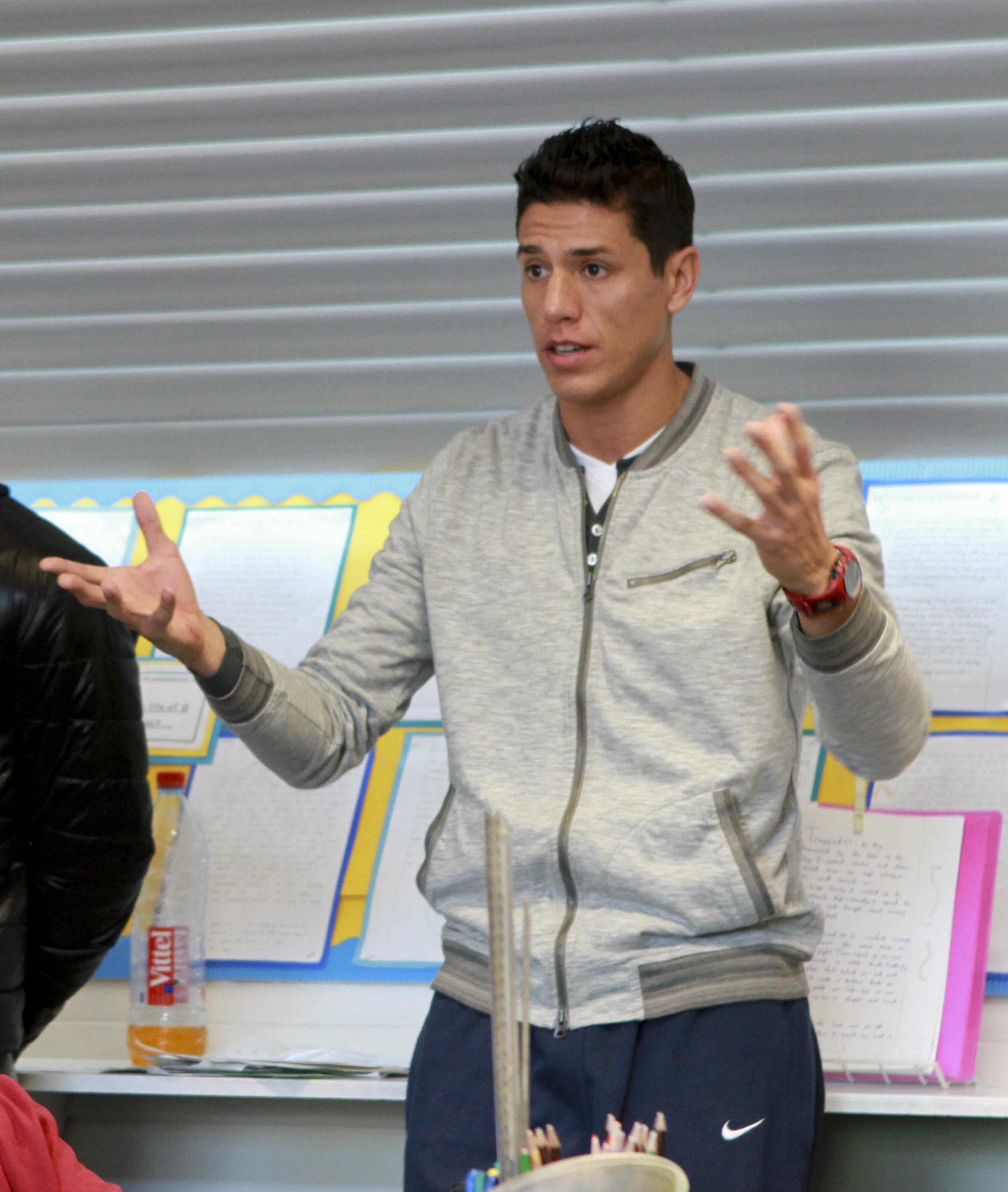
- López visiting the East London School of Tae Kwon-do in London, 2011

Personal information
- Born: November 9, 1978 (age 47) New York City, New York, U.S.
- Height: 6 ft 3 in (191 cm)
- Weight: 185 lb (84 kg)
Medal record
Men's taekwondo
Representing United States
Olympic Games
Gold medal – first place	2000 Sydney	68 kg
Gold medal – first place	2004 Athens	80 kg
Bronze medal – third place	2008 Beijing	80 kg
World Championships
Gold medal – first place	2001 Jeju	Lightweight
Gold medal – first place	2003 Garmisch	Welterweight
Gold medal – first place	2005 Madrid	Welterweight
Gold medal – first place	2007 Beijing	Welterweight
Gold medal – first place	2009 Copenhagen	Welterweight
World Junior Championships
Gold medal – first place	1996 Barcelona	Lightweight
Grand Prix
Silver medal – second place	2014 Astana	Welterweight
Bronze medal – third place	2015 Moscow	Welterweight
Pan American Games
Gold medal – first place	1999 Winnipeg	68 kg
Gold medal – first place	2003 Santo Domingo	80 kg
Bronze medal – third place	2015 Toronto	80 kg
Pan American Championships
Gold medal – first place	1996 Havana	63 kg
Gold medal – first place	1998 Lima	63 kg
Silver medal – second place	1994 Heredia	54 kg

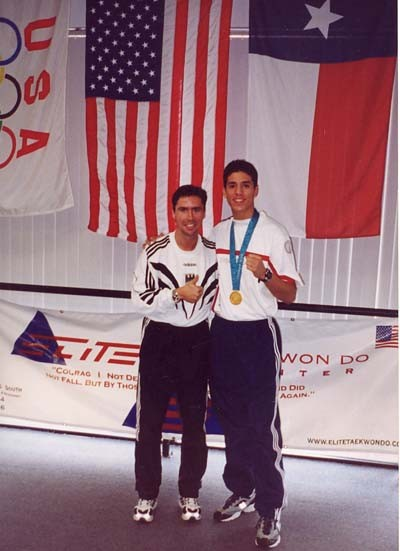
López (right) with his 2000 Olympics gold medal

Steven López (born November 9, 1978) is an American taekwondo competitor, a 2000 and 2004 Olympic gold medalist (in the -68 and -80 kg divisions, respectively) and a 2008 Olympic bronze medalist (again in the -80 kg division) and 4th Dan in taekwondo. In 2001, he won the Lightweight Taekwondo World Championship, and in 2003 he won the Welterweight Taekwondo World Championship which he has since won in 2005, 2007 and 2009 making him the first Taekwondo fighter to win 5 World Championships. With 2 Olympic titles, 5 titles in taekwondo world championships and 1 title in taekwondo world cup he is the most titled champion after Hadi Saei who earns 9 world class titles (two Olympic titles in 2004 and 2008, two world championships titles, four world cup titles and one world Olympic qualification tournament).

== Early life and athletic career ==
López was born on November 9, 1978 in New York City to Nicaraguan parents. His parents, Julio and Ondina, immigrated from Nicaragua to the United States in 1973. His father took odd jobs to support his family and they later moved to Texas. His father encouraged López, his sister, and brothers to be in taekwondo. López first learned it in his garage at the age of five from his father and Jean, his older brother. López is a 1997 graduate of Kempner High School in Sugar Land, Texas next to Houston, where he was voted "most likely to succeed" and was a member of the National Honor Society.

All of López's siblings, Mark, Diana and Jean López (coach), are USA National Team Members in taekwondo. His younger siblings, Mark and Diana, also represented the United States at the 2008 Beijing Olympics, marking the first time since 1904 that three siblings have been on the same Olympic team. Both López and his siblings, Mark (men's featherweight) and Diana (women's featherweight), made sports history in April 2005 when they claimed a world championship title at the same event (2005 World Taekwondo Championships) with their oldest brother, Jean, participating in the feat as their coach. Steven Lopez and Diana Lopez both qualified for the 2012 Olympic games in London in July 2012 at the Olympic Training Center in Colorado Springs, Colorado.

In January 2006, López tested positive for a banned substance (L-methamphetamine) which he said came from an over-the-counter vapor inhaler he used. He promptly accepted a three-month suspension and participated in an educational anti-doping program. López has appeared in People magazine's 50 Most Beautiful People. In 2012, he participated in a dating game show The Choice on Fox.

López is a Roman Catholic who attends St. Theresa Catholic Church in Sugar Land, Texas, and says his faith has always been a very important part of his life.

== Allegations of sexual misconduct and sexual assault ==
On June 8, 2017, USA Today published a news items saying that López had been accused of sexual assault and drugging of various female athletes. The accusations claimed there was a repeated pattern of behavior of abuse allegedly perpetrated by López and his brother, Jean Lopez. López and his brother both received a preliminary suspension enacted by USA Taekwondo which effectively barred them from competing in international Taekwondo competitions. Six women have come forward claiming to have been sexually assaulted by Lopez.

In December 2022, the International Court of Arbitration for Sport (CAS) lifted the lifetime ban for sexual abuse against Steven Lopez, his brother, and his coach. The CAS found that the charge by the Taekwondo World Federation was based on its 2011 Code of Ethics. However, since the incidents the brothers are accused of allegedly took place before 2011, the code should not have been used, according to CAS.

== Career highlights ==
- 2015 Grand Prix: BRONZE
- 2015 Pan American Games: BRONZE
- 2014 Grand Prix: SILVER
- 2014 USA Open: GOLD
- 2013 Argentina Open: GOLD
- 2009 World Taekwondo Championships (Welter): GOLD
- 2008 Beijing Summer Olympics: BRONZE
- 2007 World Taekwondo Championships (Welter): GOLD
- 2007 Sr. National Team Trials (Welter): 1st
- 2005 U.S. Olympic Committee Male Athlete of the Month (April)
- 2004 Athens Summer Olympics: GOLD
- 2004 US Olympic Team Trials: GOLD
- 2004 Sullivan Award Finalist
- 2003 World Taekwondo Championships: GOLD
- 2003 World Taekwondo Qualification Tournament: BRONZE
- 2003 Pan American Games: GOLD
- 2003 Sullivan Award Finalist
- 2002 World Cup Taekwondo Championships: BRONZE
- 2002 Pan American Games: GOLD
- 2001 World Taekwondo Championships: GOLD
- 2000 Sydney Summer Olympics: GOLD
- 1999 Pan American Games: GOLD
- 1999 Pan American Regional Olympic Qualifier: GOLD
- 1998 World Cup Taekwondo Championships: BRONZE
- 1998 Pan American Taekwondo Championships: GOLD
- 1997 World Cup Taekwondo Championships: GOLD
- 1996 Pan American Taekwondo Championships: GOLD
- 1996 World Junior Taekwondo Championships: GOLD
- 1995 Pan American Taekwondo Championships: SILVER
- 1994 World Cup Taekwondo Championships: BRONZE
- 1993 Jr. Olympic: BRONZE

== See also ==
- List of athletes with the most appearances at Olympic Games
