= Guillermo Pérez (taekwondo) =

Mexican taekwondo practitioner

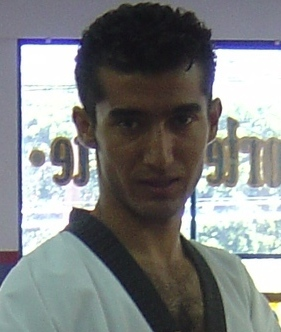

Personal information
- Full name: Guillermo Pérez Sandoval
- Born: October 14, 1979 (age 46) Taretan, Michoacán, Mexico
- Height: 1.72 m (5 ft 8 in)
Medal record
Men's taekwondo
Representing Mexico
Olympic Games
Gold medal – first place	2008 Beijing	58 kg
World Championships
Silver medal – second place	2007 Beijing	Flyweight
- Updated on 03 September 2015

Guillermo Pérez Sandoval (born October 14, 1979) is a Mexican taekwondo practitioner and Olympic gold medal winner. Pérez stands at 171 cm and weighs 58 kg.

At the 2008 Olympic Games in Beijing, China, Pérez won the gold medal in the −58 kg category. Pérez defeated Dominican Gabriel Mercedes on August 20, 2008. The match ended 1–1 after four rounds, but Pérez was deemed superior by unanimous decision.

== Early life and education ==
Pérez started practicing taekwondo when he was 5 years old, citing Bruce Lee films as his inspiration. By the age of 10, Pérez won his first state tournament in Michoacán. Such success was the gate to compete nationally, earning a bronze medal in his first national competition. In 1989, he achieved first place at the national infant competition. In 1995 he traveled to Ottawa to assist his first international competition, placing second. Later on in 1996, he was the first-place winner at the Taekwondo U.S. Open, in which more than 60 countries participated.

== Career ==
=== Mexico National Team ===
Pérez moved to Puebla in 1999 to train with the Olympic champion William de Jesús, who helped give 20-year-old Pérez the experience to get into the national team after unsuccessfully trying to enter it before. He finally became part of the Mexico taekwondo team that traveled to the Pan American Games of 1999 in Winnipeg, Manitoba, Canada.

In April 2005, he traveled to Madrid to compete in the 2005 World Taekwondo Championships, placing ninth. Three years later, he won second place at the Dutch Open, which gave him the opportunity to participate in the Beijing 2007 World Taekwondo Championships in the flyweight (−58 kg) category. There, Pérez won the silver medal, losing to Juan Antonio Ramos of Spain in the final.

=== Gold Medal ===
Earning the gold medal put Pérez among a select few for Mexico, giving the feat historical importance. His win marked only the third gold medal for Mexico since the 2000 Olympics in Sydney, and the first for a male since the 1984 Summer Olympics in Los Angeles, the 11th gold medal ever for Mexico, and the country's 53rd overall Olympic medal.
