= Ezedin Belgasem =

Libyan taekwondo practitioner (1982–2011)

Personal information
- Full name: Ezedin Belgasem Faraj Tlish
- Nationality: Libya
- Born: 5 April 1982
- Died: 1 August 2011 (aged 29) Tripoli, Libya
- Height: 1.69 m (5 ft 6 1/2 in)
- Weight: 68 kg (150 lb)

Sport
- Sport: Taekwondo
- Event: 68 kg

Ezedin Belgasem Faraj Tlish (Arabic: عز الدين بلقاسم فرج طليش; April 5, 1982 – 1 August 2011) was a Libyan taekwondo practitioner. Tlish was among thousands of civilians who were killed during the Libyan Civil War in 2011.

Tlish made his official debut for the 2004 Summer Olympics in Athens, where he competed for the men's flyweight category (58 kg). He lost the first preliminary match by a total knockout to Chinese Taipei's Chu Mu-yen, who eventually became an Olympic champion in the final.

At the 2008 Summer Olympics in Beijing, Tlish switched to a heavier class by competing in the men's lightweight division (68 kg). He was disqualified from the competition for unknown reasons, allowing his first opponent Dmitriy Kim of Uzbekistan to be given an automatic free pass for the subsequent round.
