= Dmitriy Kim =

Uzbekistani taekwondoin (born 1989)

Dmitriy Kim (born 7 October 1989 in Tashkent) is an Uzbekistani taekwondo practitioner. At the 2008 Summer Olympics, he received a walkover against Ezedin Tlish, before losing in the second round to Sung Yu-Chi. At the 2012 Summer Olympics, he competed in the Men's 68 kg competition, but was defeated in the first round.
