= Dennis Bekkers =

Dutch taekwondo practitioner

Medal record

Representing Netherlands

Men's taekwondo

World Championships
Bronze medal – third place	2005 Madrid	Featherweight
Bronze medal – third place	2007 Beijing	Featherweight

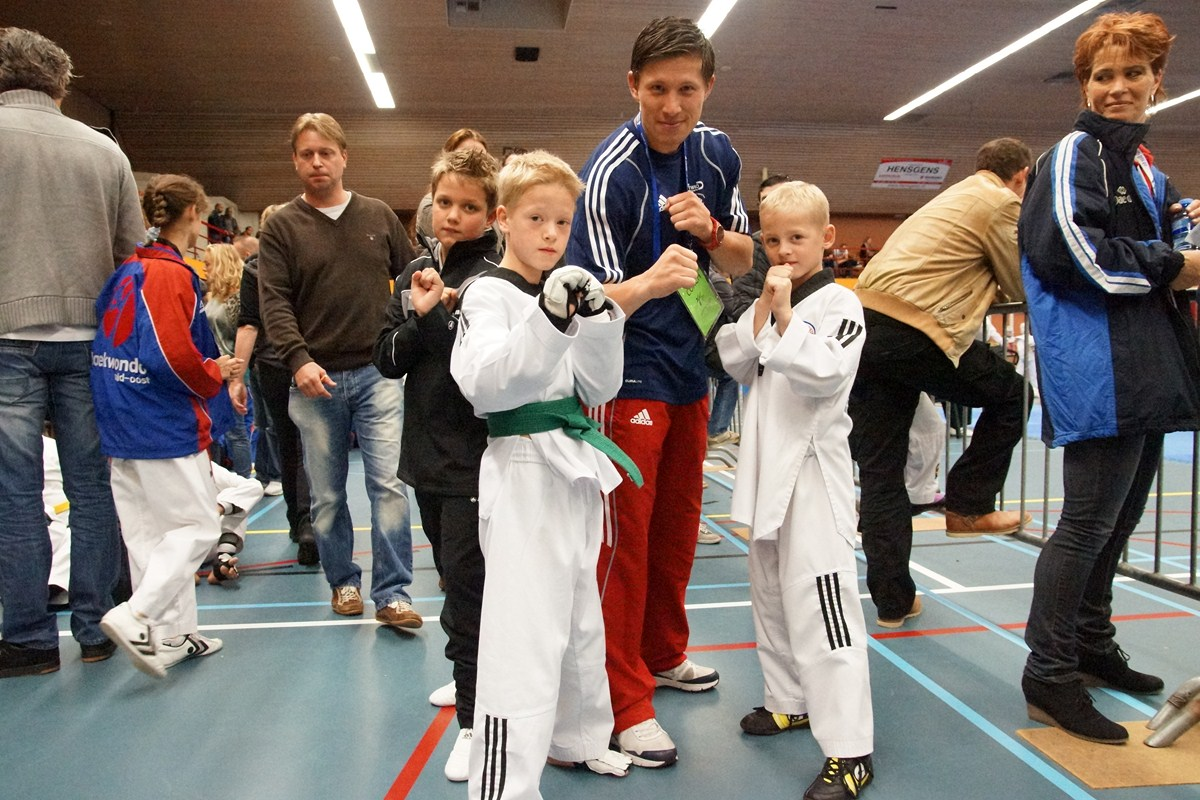
Dennis Bekkers

Dennis Bekkers (born 29 November 1980 in Den Bosch) is a taekwondo practitioner from the Netherlands.

Bekkers competes in men's -68 kilograms class also known as the featherweight. He won the silver medal at the 2005 European Championships in Riga, Latvia. That same year he also won the bronze medal at the World Championships in Madrid, Spain. In 2006, he managed to improve his European record by becoming European Champion, in Bonn. In 2007, at the Pre-Olympic World Championships in Beijing, he won another bronze medal. In 2008, at the European Championships in Rome, he won the bronze medal. With this performance he managed to qualify for the 2008 Summer Olympics in Beijing.
