= Gessler Viera =

Cuban taekwondo practitioner

Personal information
- Born: January 26, 1985 (age 41) La Lisa, Cuba

Sport
- Sport: Taekwondo
Medal record
Representing Cuba
Men's taekwondo
World Championships
Gold medal – first place	2007 Beijing	Featherweight
Central American and Caribbean Games
Gold medal – first place	2006 Cartagena	Featherweight

Gessler Viera Abreu (born January 26, 1985) is a Cuban Taekwondo athlete. In 2007, he won the gold medal in featherweight (- 67 kg) at the World Taekwondo Championships in Beijing.
