= Peter López =

Peruvian taekwondo athlete (born 1981)

Personal information
- Full name: Peter López Santos
- Born: September 13, 1981 (age 44) Irvine, California

Sport
- Sport: Taekwondo
- Event: 68 kg
Medal record
Men's taekwondo
Representing Peru
Pan American Games
Silver medal – second place	2007 Rio de Janeiro	Featherweight
South American Games
Gold medal – first place	2010 Medellín	Featherweight

Peter López Santos (born September 23, 1981) is an American-born citizen who is a Peruvian taekwondo fighter. He is most recognized for being a top international featherweight athlete for the Peruvian Taekwondo Team at present.

== Biography ==
López was born in Irvine, California, in the United States, but aged five his family returned to live in Surquillo (Lima, Peru) for a few years.

It was in Peru that López started his first taekwondo class with his dad, who would later become his coach during the early years of his career as an athlete.

Eventually the family López returned to the U.S, where he began to competeand won 1998 Youth World Champion, Champion in the older category in 2001, bronze medal of the World Cup 2002, silver medal at the 2002 Pan American Championships and bronze medal at the 2003 World Championship, among others.

In 2004, the Peruvian Taekwondo Federation invited López to lead a training course. It was at this time that he decided to represent Peru. Despite this- the "club Elite" based in Texas- continues to support him. "It's like my family," López once said about this club.

According to the Peruvian Olympic Committee, of the 15 athletes who participated in the 2008 Beijing Olympics, López was the one that had the greatest chance of winning a medal in the 'feather' category (up to 68 kilos). López won his first two matches against Burak Hasan from Australia and Isah Adam Muhammad from Nigeria before losing the semifinal matches against the American Mark Lopez. He would then dispute the bronze medal match against Servet Tazegül from Turkey where he lost by one point.

In 2011, he competed at the 2011 Pan American Games where he would also represent Peru in the 68 kilos category. He did not advance from the quarterfinals.

Lopez represented Peru at the 2012 London Olympics.
