= Isah Mohammad =

Nigerian taekwondo practitioner

Isah Adam Muhammad (born 22 April 1987 in Kano) is a Nigerian taekwondo practitioner. At the 2008 Summer Olympics, he reached the quarterfinals of the men's featherweight (-68 kg) competition. At the 2012 Summer Olympics, he competed in the Men's 68 kg competition, but was defeated in the first round.
