= Mark López (taekwondo) =

American taekwondo practitioner

Medal record

Representing United States

Men's taekwondo

Olympic Games
Silver medal – second place	2008 Beijing	-68 kg

World Championships
Gold medal – first place	2005 Madrid	Featherweight
Silver medal – second place	2003 Garmisch	Featherweight
Bronze medal – third place	2009 Copenhagen	Lightweight
Bronze medal – third place	1999 Edmonton	Bantamweight

Pan Am Championships
Silver medal – second place	2012 Sucre	Lightweight

Grand Prix
Silver medal – second place	2014 Astana	Featherweight
Bronze medal – third place	2014 Manchester	Featherweight

World University Championships
Silver medal – second place	2002 Berkeley	Featherweight

Junior World Championships
Bronze medal – third place	1998 Istanbul	Featherweight

Mark López Mendieta is an American taekwondo practitioner. Mark represented the United States in the 2008 Summer Olympics in Beijing, China. He advanced to the men's -68 kg Gold Medal Match where he lost to Korea's Tae-Jin Son on a last second hit, giving him the silver medal. Along with his brother Steven and his sister Diana, he won a gold medal at the 2005 World Taekwondo Championships.

He is the younger brother of Olympic gold medalist Steven López and their Taekwondo coach Jean Lopez and older brother of Olympian Diana López and is married to Dagmar López.

== Career highlights ==
- 2015 Argentina Open (Feather) Gold
- 2015 Pan Am Open (Feather) Silver
- 2015 Mexico Open (Feather): Silver
- 2015 Luxor Open (Feather): Silver
- 2014 Pan Am Open (Feather): Gold
- 2014 Mexico Open (Feather): Bronze
- 2014 Grand Prix Manchester (Feather): Bronze
- 2014 Grand Prix Astana (Feather):Silver
- 2014 Santo Domingo Open (Feather): Gold
- 2014 Dutch Open (Feather): Bronze
- 2014 US Open (Feather): Silver
- 2012 Pan Am Championships (light):Silver
- 2009 World Championships Denmark: BRONZE
- 2008 Olympic Games(Feather): Silver
- 2008 Olympic Trials (Feather): GOLD
- 2007 Pan Am Olympic Qualifier: SILVER
- 2007 Olympic Trials (Bantam/Feather): GOLD
- 2006 Dutch Open (Light): GOLD
- 2005 World Championships (Feather): GOLD
- 2003 World Championships (Feather): SILVER
- 2002 World University Championships (Feather): SILVER
- 2002 National Collegiate Championships (Feather): GOLD
- 2002 NCTA Male Athlete of the Year
- 2001 U.S. National Championships (Feather): GOLD
- 2001 National Collegiate Championships (Feather): GOLD
- 2000 U.S. Olympic Qualifying Tournament #1 (Fly): GOLD
- 2000 National Collegiate Championships (Feather): GOLD
- 1999 U.S. National Championships (Bantam): BRONZE
- 1999 World Championships (Bantam): BRONZE
- 1999 U.S. Junior Olympic Championships (Light): BRONZE
- 1998 U.S. Open (Fin): SILVER
- 1998 U.S. National Championships (Fin): BRONZE
- 1998 World Junior Championships (Feather): BRONZE
- 1997 U.S. Open (Junior Fly): GOLD
- 1996 U.S. Open (Junior Super Fin): GOLD
