= Sung Yu-chi =

Taiwanese taekwondo practitioner

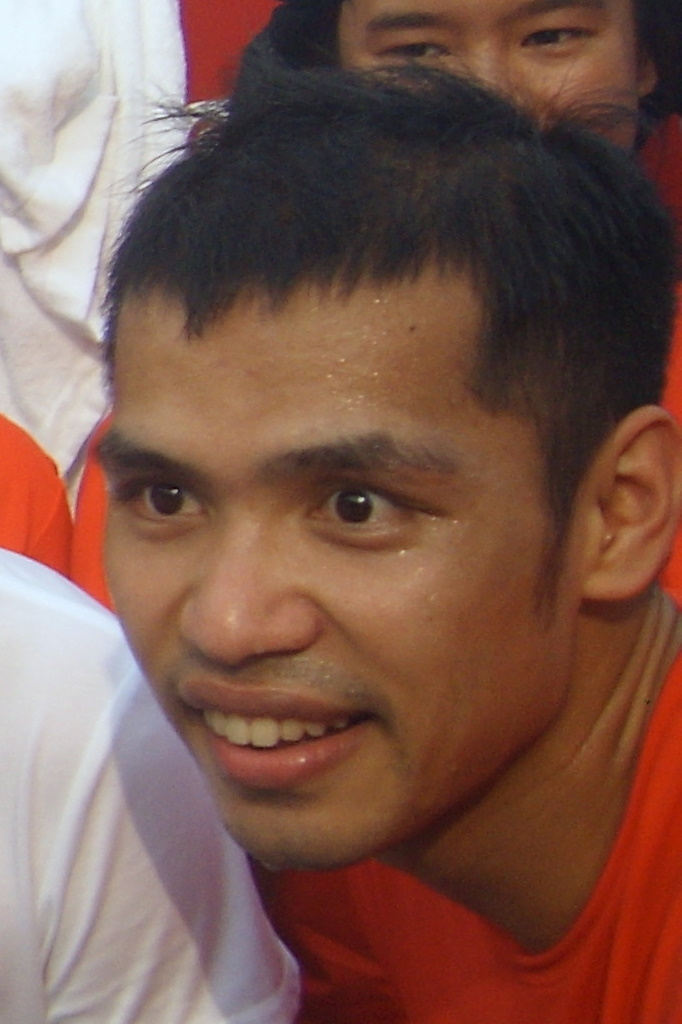

Medal record

Men's taekwondo

Representing Chinese Taipei

Olympic Games
Bronze medal – third place	2008 Beijing	68 kg

World Championships
Gold medal – first place	2007 Beijing	Lightweight

Sung Yu-chi (Chinese: 宋玉麒; pinyin: Sòng Yùqí; born 16 January 1982 in Shulin, Taipei County (now New Taipei City), Taiwan) is a Taekwondo athlete from Republic of China. He competed at the 2008 Summer Olympics held in Beijing, China and won the bronze medal.
