= List of flag bearers for Kyrgyzstan at the Olympics =

Kyrgyzstan at the Olympics
- IOC code: KGZ
- NOC: National Olympic Committee of the Republic of Kyrgyzstan
- Website: www.olympic.kg
- Medals: Gold 0 Silver 5 Bronze 8 Total 13

Summer appearances
- 1996; 2000; 2004; 2008; 2012; 2016; 2020; 2024

Winter appearances
- 1994; 1998; 2002; 2006; 2010; 2014; 2018; 2022; 2026; 2030

Other related appearances
- Russian Empire (1900–1912); Soviet Union (1952–1988); Unified Team (1992)

This is a list of flag bearers who have represented Kyrgyzstan at the Olympics.

Flag bearers carry the national flag of their country at the opening ceremony of the Olympic Games.

#	Event year	Season	Flag bearer	Sport
1	1994	Winter	Yevgeniya Roppel	Biathlon
2	1996	Summer	Sergey Ashikhmin	Swimming
3	1998	Winter	Aleksandr Tropnikov	Biathlon
4	2000	Summer	Raatbek Sanatbayev	Wrestling
5	2002	Winter	Dmitry Chvykov	Ski jumping
6	2004	Summer	Mital Sharipov	Weightlifting
7	2006	Winter	Ivan Borisov	Alpine skiing
8	2008	Summer	Talant Dzhanagulov	Judo
9	2010	Winter	Dmitry Trelevsky	Alpine skiing
10	2012	Summer	Chingiz Mamedov	Judo
11	2014	Winter	Dmitry Trelevsky	Alpine skiing
12	2016	Summer	Erkin Adylbek Uulu	Boxing
13	2018	Winter	Tariel Zharkymbaev	Cross-country skiing
14	2020	Summer	Kanykei Kubanychbekova	Shooting
14	2020	Summer	Denis Petrashov	Swimming
15	2022	Winter	Maxim Gordeev	Alpine skiing
16	2024	Summer	Elizaveta Pecherskikh	Swimming
16	2024	Summer	Erlan Sherov	Judo

== See also ==
- Kyrgyzstan at the Olympics
