= Judo at the 2008 Summer Olympics – Men's +100 kg =

Men's +100 kg at the Games of the XXIX Olympiad
- Venue: Beijing Science and Technology University Gymnasium
- Dates: 15 August 2008
- Winning score: 0010

Medalists
1st place, gold medalist(s)		Satoshi Ishii	Japan
2nd place, silver medalist(s)		Abdullo Tangriev	Uzbekistan
3rd place, bronze medalist(s)		Óscar Brayson	Cuba
3rd place, bronze medalist(s)		Teddy Riner	France

The Men's 100+ kg Judo competition at the 2008 Summer Olympics was held on August 15 at the Beijing Science and Technology University Gymnasium. Preliminary rounds started at 12:00 Noon CST. Repechage finals, semifinals, bouts for bronze medals and the final were held at 18:00pm CST.

This event was the heaviest of the men's judo weight classes, allowing competitors with over 100 kilograms of body mass. Like all other judo events, bouts lasted five minutes. If the bout was still tied at the end, it was extended for another five-minute, sudden-death period; if neither judoka scored during that period, the match is decided by the judges. The tournament bracket consisted of a single-elimination contest culminating in a gold medal match. There was also a repechage to determine the winners of the two bronze medals. Each judoka who had lost to a semifinalist competed in the repechage. The two judokas who lost in the semifinals faced the winner of the opposite half of the bracket's repechage in bronze medal bouts.

In this competition, the heaviest athlete of the Games, Ricardo Blas Jr., competed with a body weight of 210 kg. Despite his huge body, he was thrown away by his opponent in the first round, eliminating him from the tournament.

== Qualifying athletes ==
Mat	Athlete	Country
1	Tamerlan Tmenov	Russia
1	Dennis van der Geest	Netherlands
1	Talant Dzhanagulov	Kyrgyzstan
1	Pan Song	China
1	Islam El Shehaby	Egypt
1	Barna Bor	Hungary
1	Satoshi Ishii	Japan
1	Paolo Bianchessi	Italy
1	Pablo Figueroa	Puerto Rico
1	Thormodur Jonsson	Iceland
1	Yury Rybak	Belarus
1	Matjaž Ceraj	Slovenia
1	Mohammad Reza Roudaki	Iran
1	Djegui Bathily	Senegal
1	Daniel McCormick	United States
1	Lasha Gujejiani	Georgia
1	Ricardo Blas Jr.	Guam
2	Teddy Riner	France
2	Anis Chedli	Tunisia
2	Semir Pepic	Australia
2	Yeldos Ikhsangaliyev	Kazakhstan
2	Abdullo Tangriev	Uzbekistan
2	Andreas Tölzer	Germany
2	Bayarjavkhlan Makhgal	Mongolia
2	Janusz Wojnarowicz	Poland
2	Martin Padar	Estonia
2	Joel Brutus	Haiti
2	Kim Sung-bum	South Korea
2	João Schlittler	Brazil
2	Yevgen Sotnikov	Ukraine
2	Carlos Zegarra	Peru
2	Sandro López	Argentina
2	Rudy Hachache	Lebanon
2	Óscar Brayson	Cuba

== Tournament results ==
=== Final ===
Final
1	Satoshi Ishii (JPN)	0010
2	Abdullo Tangriev (UZB)	0000

=== Mat 1 ===
Round of 64
Yury Rybak (BLR)	1000
Matjaž Ceraj (SLO)	0000

Round of 32
Tamerlan Tmenov (RUS)	0101
Dennis van der Geest (NED)	0000
Talant Dzhanagulov (KGZ)	0001
Pan Song (CHN)	1001
Islam El Shehaby (EGY)	0120
Barna Bor (HUN)	0010
Satoshi Ishii (JPN)	1011
Paolo Bianchessi (ITA)	0000
Pablo Figueroa (PUR)	0001
Thormodur Jonsson (ISL)	0010
Mohammad Reza Roudaki (IRI)	1001
Yury Rybak (BLR)	0001
Djegui Bathily (SEN)	0001
Daniel McCormick (USA)	0010
Lasha Gujejiani (GEO)	0200
Ricardo Blas Jr. (GUM)	0001

Round of 16
Tamerlan Tmenov (RUS)	0200
Pan Song (CHN)	0000
Islam El Shehaby (EGY)	0000
Satoshi Ishii (JPN)	1001
Thormodur Jonsson (ISL)	0001
Mohammad Reza Roudaki (IRI)	1000
Daniel McCormick (USA)	0000
Lasha Gujejiani (GEO)	1000

Quarterfinals
Tamerlan Tmenov (RUS)	0000
Satoshi Ishii (JPN)	1001
Mohammad Reza Roudaki (IRI)	0000
Lasha Gujejiani (GEO)	0011

Semifinals
Satoshi Ishii (JPN)	1011
Lasha Gujejiani (GEO)	0000

=== Mat 2 ===
Round of 64
Joel Brutus (HAI)	0000
Kim Sung-Bum (KOR)	1001

Round of 32
Teddy Riner (FRA)	0010
Anis Chedli (TUN)	0000
Semir Pepic (AUS)	0000
Yeldos Ikhsangaliyev (KAZ)	0020
Abdullo Tangriev (UZB)	0211
Andreas Tölzer (GER)	0000
Bayarjavkhlan Makhgal (MGL)	0000
Janusz Wojnarowicz (POL)	1000
Martin Padar (EST)	1100
Kim Sung-Bum (KOR)	0000
João Schlittler (BRA)	0010
Yevgen Sotnikov (UKR)	0001
Carlos Zegarra (PER)	1001
Sandro López (ARG)	0001
Rudy Hachache (LIB)	0000
Óscar Brayson (CUB)	1011

Round of 16
Teddy Riner (FRA)	1000
Yeldos Ikhsangaliyev (KAZ)	0000
Abdullo Tangriev (UZB)	0010
Janusz Wojnarowicz (POL)	0000
Martin Padar (EST)	0000
João Schlittler (BRA)	0010
Carlos Zegarra (PER)	0000
Óscar Brayson (CUB)	1000

Quarterfinals
Teddy Riner (FRA)	0000
Abdullo Tangriev (UZB)	0001
João Schlittler (BRA)	0000
Óscar Brayson (CUB)	1000

Semifinals
Abdullo Tangriev (UZB)	1010
Óscar Brayson (CUB)	0011

=== Repechage ===
First round
Bianchessi (ITA)	0010
El Shehaby (EGY)	0000
Blas (GUM)	0010
McCormick (USA)	0100
Tölzer (GER)	0100
Wojnarowicz (POL)	0010
Hachache (LIB)	0200
Zegarra (PER)	0100

Second round
Tmenov (RUS)	0010
Bianchessi (ITA)	0000
Roudaki (IRI)	1001
McCormick (USA)	0001
Riner (FRA)	0020
Tölzer (GER)	0010
Schlittler (BRA)	1031
Hachache (LIB)	0000

Third round
Tmenov (RUS)	0001
Roudaki (IRI)	1010
Riner (FRA)	1000
Schlittler (BRA)	0000

Bronze medal finals
Brayson (CUB)	0200
Roudaki (IRI)	0000
Gujejiani (GEO)	0000
Riner (FRA)	1011
