= Kyrgyzstan at the 2022 Winter Olympics =

- Flag of Kyrgyzstan
- IOC code: KGZ
- NOC: National Olympic Committee of the Republic of Kyrgyzstan

in Beijing, China February 4–20, 2022
- Competitors: 1 (1 man and 0 women) in 1 sport
- Flag bearer (opening): Maksim Gordeev
- Flag bearer (closing): Volunteer
- Medals: Gold 0 Silver 0 Bronze 0 Total 0

Winter Olympics appearances (overview)
- 1994; 1998; 2002; 2006; 2010; 2014; 2018; 2022; 2026

Other related appearances
- Soviet Union (1956–1988)

Kyrgyzstan competed at the 2022 Winter Olympics in Beijing, China, from 4 to 20 February 2022. This edition of the Games marked Kyrgyzstan's eighth appearance at the Winter Olympics. The Kyrgyz team consisted of one male alpine skier, Maksim Gordeev. Gordeev was the country's flagbearer during the opening ceremony, while a volunteer was the flagbearer during the closing ceremony.The country did not win a medal at the Games, and has never won a Winter Olympics medal.

== Background ==
The National Olympic Committee of the Kyrgyz Republic (NOC) was founded in 1991 and recognized by the International Olympic Committee in 1993. While Kyrgyz athletes competed as a part of the Soviet Union since 1952 Summer Olympics, Kyrgyzstan made its Olympic debut as an independent nation at the 1994 Winter Olympics held in Lillehammer.

The 2022 Winter Olympics were held in Beijing, China, from 4 to 20 February 2022. This edition of the Games marked Kyrgyzstan's eighth appearance at the Winter Olympics. The Kyrgyz delegation consisted of a single alpine skier, Maxim Gordeev, his coach, Igor Borisov, and three officials–chef de mission Cholpon Zhumagaziyeva, Sadyr Mamytov, and Kylychbek Sarbagishev, president and secretary general of the NOC. Gordeyev served as the nation's flag bearer during the opening ceremony. Kyrgyz president Sadyr Japarov also attended the Games. A volunteer served as the flag-bearer during the closing ceremony. The country did not win a medal at the Games, and has never won a Winter Olympics medal.

== Competitors ==
The Kyrgyz contingent consisted of one athlete competing in a single sport.

Sport	Men	Women	Total
Alpine skiing	1	0	1
Total	1	0	1

== Alpine skiing ==
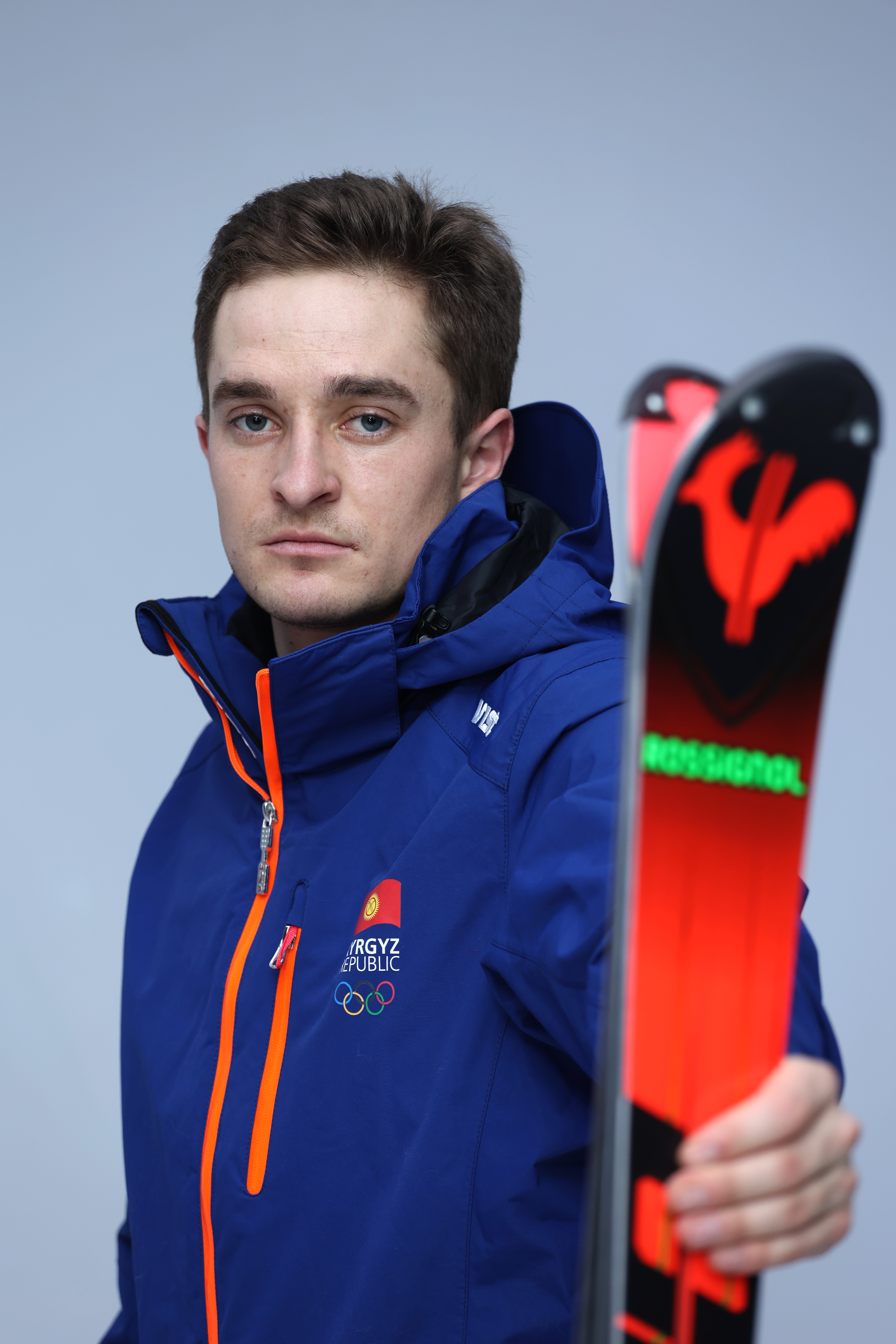
Maksim Gordeev was the lone Kyrgyz participant at the Games

The basic qualification mark for the slalom event stipulated an average of less than 160 points in the list published by the International Ski Federation (FIS) as on 17 January 2022. The quotas were allocated further based on athletes satisfying other criteria with a maximum of 22 athletes (11 male and 11 female athletes) from a single participating National Olympic Committee. Maxim Gordeev met the basic qualification standard with 129.32 points in the slalom category. Subject to the other criteria, Gordeev qualified to participate in the slalom event at the Games.

Gordeev was born on 1 November 1995 in Karakol. He started competing internationally in 2014. Before the 2022 Winter Olympics, he had represented Kyrgyzstan at four World Championships and two Winter Universiades. The 2022 edition was Gordeev's first Olympic appearance. He was only the fourth athlete from Kyrgyzstan to compete in alpine skiing at the Winter Olympics after his coach Borisov, Dmitry Trelevsky, and Evgeniy Timofeev.

Gordeyev competed in the men's slalom event held on 16 February 2022 at the Yanqing National Alpine Skiing Centre. He did not finish his first run, and was not classified in the final table.

Athlete	Event	Run 1		Run 2		Total	
Athlete	Event	Time	Rank	Time	Rank	Time	Rank
Maxim Gordeev	Men's slalom	DNF		Did not advance			

== See also ==
- Kyrgyzstan at the 2020 Summer Olympics
