= Stroke Order Standard of GB 13000.1 Character Set =

Chinese standard for stroke-based sorting

Stroke Order Standard of GB 13000.1 Character Set, full name GB 13000.1 Character Set Chinese Character Stroke Order Standard (GF 3002-1999) (simplified Chinese: GB 13000.1字符集汉字笔顺规范; traditional Chinese: GB 13000.1字元集漢字筆順規範; pinyin: GB 13000.1 Zìfújí Hànzì Bǐshùn Guīfàn), is a Chinese national standard on the order of strokes in writing Chinese characters. It has stipulated the stroke orders of 20,902 CJK Unified Ideographs. This standard was promulgated by the State Language Commission on October 1, 1999 and implemented on January 1, 2000. It is applicable to Chinese character information processing, dictionary compilation, Chinese character teaching and research, etc.

The standard has been applied to the arrangement of Xinhua Zidian and Xiandai Hanyu Cidian.

== GB 13000.1 character set ==
GB 13000.1 is a national standard character set of the People's Republic of China, equivalent to the international standard ISO/IEC 10646, that is, the unified Chinese character set for China, Japan and Korea in the Unicode 1.1 version, containing 20,902 Chinese characters, with a Unicode encoding range of 4E00~9FA5.

== Related concepts ==
According to the official document, the relevant terms are defined as follows:

- Stroke: The smallest unit of continued lines that constitutes the shape of a regular script Chinese character.
- Stroke form: The shape of a stroke. There are five basic categories of stroke forms in the order of "㇐(horizontal), ㇑(vertical), ㇓(left stroke), ㇔(dot) and ㇕(fold)", represented by their serial numbers 1, 2, 3, 4, and 5 respectively.
- Component: A unit of Chinese characters composed of strokes that has the function of assembling Chinese characters.
- Stroke number: The number of strokes that constitute a Chinese character or a Chinese character component.
- Stroke order: The order of strokes when writing a Chinese character. This standard uses serial number stroke order representation. For example, the stroke order of the character "札" is "12345" (㇐㇑㇓㇔㇟).

== Principles ==
This standard is based on the Standard Stroke Orders of Commonly-used Characters in Modern Chinese published in 1997. The standard stroke orders of the 20,902 Chinese characters of the GB 13000.1 character set are determined according to the following principles

1. Among the 20,902 Chinese characters, the 7,000 commonly used characters follow the standard stroke orders of commonly used characters. For example: 大 (134), 王 (1121), 雨 (12524444), etc.
2. For characters composed of characters or components that have appeared in the common characters, the stroke orders of their components shall be determined according to the standard stroke orders of the common characters or components. For example: 蠚 (12213251 251214 251214; 若 12213251，虫 251214，虫 251214), 児 (22511 35; 旧 22511, 儿 35), 熧 (332 3434 2134 4334, cf. 彳从走火), etc.
3. For characters with the same structure as some common characters, the stroke orders shall be determined according to the standard stroke orders of the common characters. For example (the characters in brackets are examples of common characters for reference): 學 (3211343451145 521, 辔), 虈 (122 251251132511134251251, 彘), 図 (2544341, 义), etc.
4. For characters with special structural methods, refer to the standard stroke orders of the relevant characters or components of common characters to determine their stroke orders. For example: 赱 (121434, 之), 丯 (3332, 丰), 卐 (5121, 卍), etc.
5. For a composite component composed of four basic components, the basic components are completely the same or two-two the same, the stroke order is determined in the order of top to bottom. Individual cases need to be determined by comprehensive factors. For example: 燚 (43344334 43344334, first up then down), 槑 (251251 12341234, first up then down), 臸 (154121 154121, first left then right).
6. Some traditional Chinese characters have their stroke order determined in the spirit of taking into account tradition and trying to be consistent with Hong Kong and Taiwan. For example: 鳥 (32511154444), 門 (25112511), 鬥 (2112111212), etc.
7. The special characters for Japan and Korea have their stroke orders determined according to the principles of the Chinese character stroke order standard. Such as: 弐 (111154, 弍㇐㇐㇀㇂㇔), 乄 (54, 爻㇓㇔㇓㇏), 廃 (413543341135, 无开), etc.

== Stroke Order Table ==
The main body of the standard document is a table of stroke orders for the 20,902 characters. There are five columns in the table, respectively for serial numbers (序号), exchange codes (交换码), Chinese characters (汉字), number of strokes (笔画数) and stroke orders (笔顺). The exchange code is in Unicode, with code points ranging from 4E00 (一) to 9FA5 (龥). The first 10 entries of the table are as follows.

Stroke Orders of GB 13000.1 Chinese Characters
Serial No.	Unicode	Character	Stroke number	Stroke order
1	4E00	一	1	1
2	4E01	丁	2	12
3	4E02	丂	2	15
4	4E03	七	2	15
5	4E04	丄	2	21
6	4E05	丅	2	12
7	4E06	丆	2	13
8	4E07	万	3	153
9	4E08	丈	3	134
10	4E09	三	3	111

For more examples, please see sample pages 4-5 in the official document on the Web.

== See also ==
- Stroke Orders of the Commonly Used Standard Chinese Characters
- GB stroke-based sorting
