= Stroke order (disambiguation) =

Stroke order refers to the order in which the strokes of a Chinese character are written.

Stroke order may also refer to:

- Hangul, whose letters have a stroke order
- Surname stroke order, a method of listing Chinese names in order of increasing stroke count
- Stroke-based sorting, a method of sorting characters in Chinese dictionaries
  - GB stroke-based order, a standard for stroke-based sorting
- Stroke number, the number of strokes in a Chinese character
- Stroke count method, a Chinese input method based on the number and order of strokes in characters
- 2008 Summer Olympics Parade of Nations, where participants were sorted based on stroke count and order
