= Kyrgyzstan at the 1998 Winter Olympics =

- IOC code: KGZ
- NOC: National Olympic Committee of the Republic of Kyrgyzstan

in Nagano
- Competitors: 1 (1 man and 0 women) in 1 sport
- Flag bearer: Aleksandr Tropnikov
- Medals: Gold 0 Silver 0 Bronze 0 Total 0

Winter Olympics appearances (overview)
- 1994; 1998; 2002; 2006; 2010; 2014; 2018; 2022; 2026

Other related appearances
- Soviet Union (1956–1988)

Kyrgyzstan competed at the 1998 Winter Olympics in Nagano, Japan, from 7 to 22 February 1998. This edition of the Games marked Kyrgyzstan's second appearance at the Winter Olympics after its debut at the 1994 Winter Olympics. Biathlete Aleksandr Tropnikov was the only competitor for the Asian nation at these Olympics. Tropnikov was the country's flagbearer during the opening ceremony. The country did not win a medal at the Games, and has never won a Winter Olympics medal.

== Background ==
The National Olympic Committee of the Kyrgyz Republic (NOC) was founded in 1991 and recognized by the International Olympic Committee in 1993. While Kyrgyz athletes competed as a part of the Soviet Union since 1952 Summer Olympics, Kyrgyzstan made its Olympic debut as an independent nation at the 1994 Winter Olympics held in Lillehammer.

The 1998 Winter Olympics were held in Nagano, Japan, from 8 to 22 February 1998. This edition of the Games marked Kyrgyzstan's second appearance at the Winter Olympics. The Kyrgyz delegation consisted of a single athlete, Aleksandr Tropnikov, Tropnikov served as the nation's flag bearer during the opening ceremony. The country did not win a medal at the Games, and has never won a Winter Olympics medal.

== Competitors ==
The Kyrgyz contingent consisted of one athlete competing in a single sport.

Sport	Men	Women	Total
Biathlon	1	0	1
Total	1	0	1

== Biathlon ==
Kyrgyzstan was represented by one male athlete, Aleksandr Tropnikov, who participated in the men's 10 kilometre sprint and 20 kilometre individual events. Tropnikov was born on 1 August 1965 in Cherepanovo, Novosibirsk, Soviet Union. He made his debut at the Biathlon World Championships in the 1992 edition at Novosibirsk. This was his first appearance at the Winter Olympics. He was the first male and the second athlete ever to represent Kyrgyzstan at the Winter Olympics after Yevgeniya Roppel at the 1994 Winter Olympics.

The men's 20 kilometre individual event was held on 11 February 1998 at Nozawa Onsen. He recorded a time of 59:17.7. Two minutes were added to his time after he had missed two targets, and he finished with an adjusted time of 1:01:17.7. He was placed 36th among 72 competitors in the final classification. On 18 February 1998, Tropnikov competed in the men's 10 kilometre sprint. He recorded a time of 31:55.8, with four missed targets, and finished 65th among 73 competitors.

Athlete	Event	Misses ^{1}	Time	Rank
Aleksandr Tropnikov	Men's 10 km Sprint	4	31:55.8	65

Event	Athlete	Time	Misses	Adjusted time ^{2}	Rank
Aleksandr Tropnikov	Men's 20 km	59:17.7	2	1'01:17.7	36

^{1} A penalty loop of 150 meters had to be skied per missed target.
^{2} One minute added per missed target.
