= Judo at the 2011 Pan American Games – Men's +100 kg =

Men's +100 kg at the 2011 Pan American Games
- Venue: CODE II Gymnasium
- Dates: October 26
- Competitors: 10 from 10 nations

Medalists
Gold medal	Oscar Brayson	Cuba
Silver medal	Rafael Da Silva	Brazil
Bronze medal	Anthony Turner	United States
Bronze medal	Pablo Figueroa	Puerto Rico

The men's +100 kg competition of the judo events at the 2011 Pan American Games in Guadalajara, Mexico, was held on October 26 at the CODE II Gymanasium. The defending champion was Oscar Brayson of Cuba, who successfully defended his title.

== Schedule ==
All times are Central Standard Time (UTC-6).

Date	Time	Round
October 26, 2011	11:00	Preliminaries
October 26, 2011	11:32	Quarterfinals
October 26, 2011	12:20	Repechage
October 26, 2011	12:52	Semifinals
October 26, 2011	17:00	Bronze medal matches
October 26, 2011	17:16	Final

== Results ==
Legend

- 1st number = Ippon
- 2nd number = Waza-ari
- 3rd number = Yuko

=== Bracket ===
Preliminaries
Ramon Flores (MEX)	100
Anibal Acuña (VEN)	000
Luis Salazar (COL)	100
Darrel Castillo (GUA)	000

Quarter Finals
Rafael Da Silva (BRA)	100
Anthony Turner (USA)	001
Orlando Baccino (ARG)	000
Ramon Flores (MEX)	001
Oscar Brayson (CUB)	100
Pablo Figueroa (PUR)	000
Luis Salazar (COL)	001
Carlos Zegarra (PER)	000

Semi Finals
Rafael Da Silva (BRA)	100
Ramon Flores (MEX)	000
Oscar Brayson (CUB)	100
Luis Salazar (COL)	000

Final
Rafael Da Silva (BRA)	000
Oscar Brayson (CUB)	010

=== Repechage round ===
Two bronze medals were awarded.

First round
Anthony Turner (USA)
Bye
Anibal Acuña (VEN)	000
Orlando Baccino (ARG)	100
Pablo Figueroa (PUR)
Bye
Darrel Castillo (GUA)	000
Carlos Zegarra (PER)	100

Semifinals
Anthony Turner (USA)	102
Orlando Baccino (ARG)	000
Pablo Figueroa (PUR)	010
Carlos Zegarra (PER)	000

Finals
Luis Salazar (COL)	000
Anthony Turner (USA)	010
Ramon Flores (MEX)	001
Pablo Figueroa (PUR)	010
