= Kyrgyzstan at the 2002 Winter Olympics =

- IOC code: KGZ
- NOC: National Olympic Committee of the Republic of Kyrgyzstan

in Salt Lake City, Utah
- Competitors: 2 (2 men and 0 women) in 2 sports
- Flag bearer: Dmitry Chvykov (ski jumping)
- Medals: Gold 0 Silver 0 Bronze 0 Total 0

Winter Olympics appearances (overview)
- 1994; 1998; 2002; 2006; 2010; 2014; 2018; 2022; 2026

Other related appearances
- Soviet Union (1956–1988)

Kyrgyzstan was represented at the 2002 Winter Olympics in Salt Lake City, Utah, United States by the National Olympic Committee of the Republic of Kyrgyzstan.

In total, two athletes – both men – represented Kyrgyzstan in two different sports including biathlon and ski jumping.

== Competitors ==
In total, two athletes represented Kyrgyzstan at the 2002 Winter Olympics in Salt Lake City, Utah, United States across two different sports.

Sport	Men	Women	Total
Biathlon	1	0	1
Ski jumping	1	—	1
Total	2	0	2

== Biathlon ==
In total, one Kyrgyz athlete participated in the biathlon events – Aleksandr Tropnikov in the men's sprint and the men's individual.

The men's individual took place on 11 February 2002. Tropnikov completed the course in a time of 58 minutes 5.3 seconds but with two shooting misses for an adjusted time of one hour 5.3 seconds to finish in 73rd place overall.

Event	Athlete	Time	Misses	Adjusted time ^{1}	Rank
20 km	Aleksandr Tropnikov	58:05.3	2	1'00:05.3	73

The men's sprint took place on 13 February 2002. Tropnikov completed the course in a time of 29 minutes 30.2 seconds but with two shooting misses to finish in 77th place overall.

Event	Athlete	Misses ^{2}	Time	Rank
10 km sprint	Aleksandr Tropnikov	2	29:30.2	77

^{1} One minute added per missed target.
^{2} A penalty loop of 150 metres had to be skied per missed target.

== Ski jumping ==
In total, one Kyrgyz athlete participated in the ski jumping events – Dmitry Chvykov in the individual normal hill and the individual large hill.

The individual normal hill took place on 10 February 2002. In the qualifying round, Chvykov scored 104 points from his jump and advanced to the final round. He scored 101.5 points on his jump in the first round of the final but did not advance to the second round of jumps and finished 41st overall.

The qualifying round for the individual large hill took place on 12 February 2002. In the qualifying round, Chvykov scored 88.5 points from his jump and advanced to the final round which took place the following day. He scored 98.4 points on his jump in the first round of the final but did not advance to the second round of jumps and finished joint 39th overall.

Athlete	Event	Qualifying jump			Final jump 1			Final jump 2		Total	
Athlete	Event	Distance	Points	Rank	Distance	Points	Rank	Distance	Points	Points	Rank
Dmitry Chvykov	Normal hill	86.5	104.0	27 Q	85.0	101.5	41	did not advance			
Dmitry Chvykov	Large hill	107.5	88.5	30 Q	113.0	98.4	39	did not advance			
