= Kyrgyzstan at the 2018 Winter Olympics =

- Flag of Kyrgyzstan
- IOC code: KGZ
- NOC: National Olympic Committee of the Republic of Kyrgyzstan

in Pyeongchang, South Korea 9–25 February 2018
- Competitors: 2 in 2 sports
- Flag bearer: Tariel Zharkymbaev (opening)
- Medals: Gold 0 Silver 0 Bronze 0 Total 0

Winter Olympics appearances (overview)
- 1994; 1998; 2002; 2006; 2010; 2014; 2018; 2022; 2026

Other related appearances
- Soviet Union (1956–1988)

Kyrgyzstan competed at the 2018 Winter Olympics in Pyeongchang, South Korea, from 9 to 25 February 2018. The country's participation in Pyeongchang marked its seventh appearance in the Winter Olympics.

Kyrgyzstan was represented by two athletes who competed across two sports. Tariel Zharkymbaev served as the country's flag-bearer during the opening ceremony and a volunteer carried the flag during the closing ceremony. Kyrgyzstan did not win any medals in the Games.

== Background ==
The National Olympic Committee of the Republic of Kyrgyzstan was formed in 1992 and recognized by the International Olympic Committee in 1993. The nation made its participation as a part of Soviet Union previously. It made its first Olympics appearance as an independent nation at the 1992 Summer Olympics. The current edition marked its seventh appearance at the Winter Games.

The 2018 Winter Olympics were held in Pyeongchang, South Korea between 9 and 25 February 2018. Kyrgyzstan was represented by a lone athlete. Tariel Zharkymbaev served as the country's flag-bearer during the opening ceremony, and a volunteer carried the flag during the closing ceremony. He did not win a medal.

== Competitors ==
The nation was represented by two athletes.

Sport	Men	Women	Total
Alpine skiing	1	0	1
Cross-country skiing	1	0	1
Total	2	0	2

== Alpine skiing ==
Kyrgyzstan qualified one male alpine skier, Evgeniy Timofeev. Timofeev was the only athlete to represent the country four years prior in the previous Winter Games, as a last-minute injury substitute.

The Alpine skiing events were held at the Jeongseon Alpine Centre in Bukpyeong. The course for the events was designed by former Olympic champion Bernhard Russi. The weather was cold and windy during the events, and it was the coldest since the 1994 Winter Olympics at Lillehammer. Timofeev recorded his best finish in the men's slalom event, after he was ranked in 40th place. In the men's giant slalom event, he was ranked 63rd amongst the 109 competitors.

Athlete	Event	Run 1		Run 2		Total	
Athlete	Event	Time	Rank	Time	Rank	Time	Rank
Evgeniy Timofeev	Men's giant slalom	1:20.90	72	1:20.13	63	2:41.03	63
Evgeniy Timofeev	Men's slalom	1:01.56	49	1:02.37	40	2:03.93	40

== Cross-country skiing ==
Kyrgyzstan qualified one male cross-country skier, Tariel Zharkymbaev. This was the Winter Olympics debut for Zharkymbaev.

The men's sprint cross country skiing competitions were held on 13 February 2018 at Alpensia Cross-Country Centre, Alpensia Resort, Mountain Cluster, Daegwallyeong. Zharkymbaev finished 78th in the qualification rounds amongst the 80 competitors and did not advance to the next round.

Sprint

Athlete	Event	Qualification		Quarterfinal		Semifinal		Final	
Athlete	Event	Time	Rank	Time	Rank	Time	Rank	Time	Rank
Tariel Zharkymbaev	Men's sprint	4:05.99	78	did not advance					

== See also ==
- Kyrgyzstan at the 2017 Asian Winter Games
- Kyrgyzstan at the 2018 Summer Youth Olympics
