= Kyrgyzstan at the 2006 Winter Olympics =

- IOC code: KGZ
- NOC: National Olympic Committee of the Republic of Kyrgyzstan

in Turin
- Competitors: 1 (1 man) in 1 sport
- Flag bearers: Ivan Borisov (opening and closing)
- Medals: Gold 0 Silver 0 Bronze 0 Total 0

Winter Olympics appearances (overview)
- 1994; 1998; 2002; 2006; 2010; 2014; 2018; 2022; 2026

Other related appearances
- Soviet Union (1956–1988)

Kyrgyzstan a delegation to compete in the 2006 Winter Olympics in Turin, Italy from 10 to 26 February 2006. This was Kyrgyzstan's fourth appearance at a Winter Olympic Games. The delegation consisted of a single alpine skier, first-time Olympian Ivan Borisov. His best performance was 41st in the men's giant slalom, and he was disqualified from the men's slalom.

== Background ==
Following the Dissolution of the Soviet Union in 1991, the National Olympic Committee of the Republic of Kyrgyzstan was recognized by the International Olympic Committee on 1 January 1993. Kyrgyzstan has participated in every Winter Olympics since the 1994 Lillehammer Games, and every Summer Olympics since the 1996 Atlanta Games. This was therefore Kyrgyzstan's fourth appearance at a Winter Olympics. The Kyrgyzstani delegation to Turin consisted of a single athlete, alpine skier Ivan Borisov. He was the flag bearer for both the opening ceremony and the closing ceremony.

== Alpine skiing ==
Ivan Borisov was 26 years old at the time of the Turin Olympics, and was making his Olympic debut. On 20 February he took part in the men's giant slalom, posting run times of 1 minute and 59.49 seconds and 1 minute and 37.61 seconds; in both heats, he was the last finisher. He finished in 41st and last place with a time of 3 minutes and 37.10 seconds, nearly 30 seconds behind 40th place, but there were 40 other competitors who failed to finish both legs. On 25 February, in the slalom, Borisov finished the first run in 1 minute and 9.54 seconds. In the second run, he posted a provisional time of 1 minute and 21.07 seconds, but was disqualified for missing a gate.

Athlete	Event	Final				
Athlete	Event	Run 1	Run 2	Run 3	Total	Rank
Ivan Borisov	Men's giant slalom	1:59.49	1:37.61	n/a	3:37.10	41
Ivan Borisov	Men's slalom	1:09.54	disqualified			

== See also ==
- Kyrgyzstan at the 2006 Asian Games
