= Kyrgyzstan at the 1994 Winter Olympics =

- IOC code: KGZ
- NOC: National Olympic Committee of the Republic of Kyrgyzstan

in Lillehammer
- Competitors: 1 (0 men and 1 woman) in 1 sport
- Flag bearer: Yevgeniya Roppel
- Medals: Gold 0 Silver 0 Bronze 0 Total 0

Winter Olympics appearances (overview)
- 1994; 1998; 2002; 2006; 2010; 2014; 2018; 2022; 2026

Other related appearances
- Soviet Union (1956–1988)

Kyrgyzstan competed at the 1994 Winter Olympics in Lillehammer, Norway, from 12 to 27 February 1984. This edition of the Games marked Kyrgyzstan's debut appearance at the Winter Olympics. Biathlete Yevgeniya Roppel was the sole competitor for the nation at the Games and was the designated flag bearer for the opening ceremony. The country did not win a medal at the Games.

== Background ==
The National Olympic Committee of the Kyrgyz Republic (NOC) was founded in 1991 and recognized by the International Olympic Committee in 1993. While Kyrgyz athletes competed as a part of the Soviet Union since 1952 Summer Olympics, Kyrgyzstan made its Olympic debut as an independent nation at the 1994 Winter Olympics held in Lillehammer.

The 1994 Winter Olympics were held in Lillehammer, Norway, from 12 to 27 February 1994. The Kyrgyz delegation consisted of a single athlete, Yevgeniya Roppel, who was the nation's designated flag bearer during the opening ceremony. The country did not win a medal at the Games.

== Competitors ==
The Kyrgyz contingent consisted of a single athlete competing in a single sport.

Sport	Men	Women	Total
Biathlon	0	1	1
Total	0	1	1

== Biathlon ==
Kyrgyzstan was represented by one female athlete, Yevgeniya Roppel, who competed in the women's 7.5 kilometre sprint and 15 kilometre individual events. Roppel became the first athlete to represent Kyrgyzstan as an independent nation at the Winter Olympics following the dissolution of the Soviet Union. Roppel was born on 24 April 1976. The 1994 edition was her first and only appearance at the Winter Olympics.

The women's 15 kilometre individual event was held on 18 February 1994 at the Birkebeineren Ski Stadium in Lillehammer. Roppel recorded a skiing time of 57:46.6, with five missed targets resulting in five minutes of penalties. Her adjusted time was 1:02:46.6, which placed her 67th among 69 competitors. On 23 February 1994, Roppel competed in the women's 7.5 kilometre sprint at the same venue. She recorded a time of 31:08.0, with three missed targets, and finished 66th among the 69 competitors.

Athlete	Event	Final		
Athlete	Event	Time	Penalty	Rank
Yevgeniya Roppel	Women's 7.5 km sprint	31:08.0	3	66
Yevgeniya Roppel	Women's 15 km individual	1:02:46.6	5	67
