= João Schlittler =

Brazilian judoka (born 1985)

Personal information
- Full name: João Gabriel Schlittler
- Born: 10 February 1985 (age 41) Rio de Janeiro, Brazil
- Occupation: Judoka
- Height: 1.97 m (6 ft 6 in)
- Weight: 110 kg (243 lb)

Sport
- Country: Brazil
- Sport: Judo
- Weight class: +100 kg
- Club: Flamengo

Achievements and titles
- Olympic Games: 7th (2008)
- World Champ.: (bronze) (2007)
- Pan American Champ.: (2007)
Medal record
Men's judo
Representing Brazil
World Championships
Bronze medal – third place	2007 Rio de Janeiro	+100 kg
Pan American Games
Silver medal – second place	2007 Rio de Janeiro	+100 kg
Pan American Championships
Silver medal – second place	2009 Buenos Aires	+100 kg
IJF Grand Slam
Gold medal – first place	2011 Rio de Janeiro	+100 kg

Profile at external databases
- IJF: 2461
- JudoInside.com: 32576
- Updated on 19 November 2022

João Gabriel Schlittler (born 10 February 1985 in Rio de Janeiro) is a Brazilian judoka, who played in the heavyweight category. In 2007, he won a silver medal for his designated category at the Pan American Games, and a bronze at the World Championships, coincidentally in his home city. Schlitter stands 1.97 metres (6 ft 5.5 in) tall and weighs 110 kilograms (243 lb). He is also currently a member of Clube de Regatas do Flamengo, a famous sport club in Rio de Janeiro.

Schlittler represented Brazil at the 2008 Summer Olympics in Beijing, where he competed for the men's heavyweight class (+100 kg). He reached only the quarterfinal round, where he lost by an automatic ippon to Cuba's Óscar Brayson, who also defeated him in the gold medal match at the Pan American Games. Because his opponent advanced further into the final match, Schlittler offered another shot for the bronze medal by defeating Lebanon's Rudy Hachache, with a tate shiho gatame (seven mat holds) and an ippon, in the repechage bout. Unfortunately, he finished only in seventh place, after losing out in the final repechage bout to six-foot and eight-inch tall French judoka Teddy Riner, who successfully scored an ippon in more than a minute.
