= Kyrgyzstan at the 2014 Winter Olympics =

- IOC code: KGZ
- NOC: National Olympic Committee of the Republic of Kyrgyzstan

in Sochi
- Competitors: 1 in 1 sport
- Flag bearer (opening): Dmitry Trelevski
- Flag bearer (closing): Evgeniy Timofeev
- Medals: Gold 0 Silver 0 Bronze 0 Total 0

Winter Olympics appearances (overview)
- 1994; 1998; 2002; 2006; 2010; 2014; 2018; 2022; 2026

Other related appearances
- Soviet Union (1956–1988)

Kyrgyzstan competed at the 2014 Winter Olympics in Sochi, Russia, from 7 to 23 February 2014. This edition of the Games marked Kyrgyzstan's sixth appearance at the Winter Olympics.

The Kyrgyz team consisted of one male alpine skier, Evgeniy Timofeev. Timofeev replaced Dmitry Trelevski after Trelevski sustained an injury during training in the lead up to the Games. Trelevski was the country's flagbearer during the opening ceremony, while Timofeev was the flagbearer during the closing ceremony. The country did not win a medal at the Games, and has never won a Winter Olympics medal.

== Background ==
The National Olympic Committee of the Kyrgyz Republic was founded in 1991 and recognized by the International Olympic Committee (IOC) in 1993. While Kyrgyz athletes competed as a part of the Soviet Union since 1952 Summer Olympics, Kyrgyzstan made its Olympic debut as an independent nation at the 1994 Winter Olympics held in Lillehammer.

The 2014 Winter Olympics were held in Sochi, Russia, from 7 to 23 February 2014. This edition of the Games marked Kyrgyzstan's sixth appearance at the Winter Olympics. The Kyrgyz delegation initially consisted of alpine skier Dmitry Trelevski, who was scheduled to compete in his second consecutive Winter Olympics, and four officials. The Government of Kyrgyzstan allocated US$1,980 to help support Trevelski in his preparations after he qualified for the Games. According to Nurdin Sultambayev, spokesman for the State Agency for Physical Education and Sport, "winter sports are the most expensive out there and Kyrgyzstan lacked the money to fund a larger team".

On 12 February 2014, Trelevski sustained a serious knee injury during training and was unable to compete. Later, the Kyrgyz National Olympic Committee requested permission from the IOC to replace him, and Evgeniy Timofeev took part in the Games. Trelevski was the country's flagbearer during the opening ceremony, while Timofeev was the flagbearer during the closing ceremony. The country did not win a medal at the Games, and has never won a Winter Olympics medal.

== Competitors ==
The Kyrgyz contingent consisted of one athlete competing in a single sport.

Sport	Men	Women	Total
Alpine skiing	1	0	1
Total	1	0	1

== Alpine skiing ==
The basic qualification mark for slalom and giant slalom events stipulated an average of less than 140 points in the list published by the International Ski Federation (FIS) as of 19 January 2014 for competitors ranked outside the top 100. The quotas were allocated further based on athletes satisfying other criteria, with a maximum of 22 athletes (maximum of 14 male or 14 female athletes) from a single participating NOC with not more than four participants in a single event. As per the final quota allocation released on 20 January 2014, Kyrgyzstan was allocated one quota place for the slalom and giant slalom events.

While Dmitry Trelevski was slated to compete for the nation at the Games, he had to be later replaced by Evgeniy Timofeev after Trelevski sustained an injury during training in the lead up to the Games. Timofeev was born on 16 October 1994 in Bishkek. He started competing internationally in 2011. Before the 2014 Winter Olympics, he had represented Kyrgyzstan at two World Championships. The 2014 edition was Timofeev's debut Olympic appearance. He was only the third athlete from Kyrgyzstan to compete in alpine skiing at the Winter Olympics after Igor Borisov and Trelevsky.

The giant slalom event was held on 19 February 2014 at the Rosa Khutor Alpine Resort. Timofeev completed his first run in 1:34.65 to be ranked 68th among the 107 competitors. He took slightly longer to complete the course in his second run at 1:37.07 to be ranked 63rd among the competition. With a combined time of 3:11.72, he finished 61st among the 72 classified finishers in the overall classification. The slalom event was held on 22 February 2014. Timofeev completed his first run in 1:02.47 to be ranked 73rd among the 115 competitors. Though he took slightly longer to complete the course in his second run at 1:12.96, he was ranked 41st in the classification. With a combined time of 2:15.43, he finished 41st among the 43 classified finishers in the overall classification.

Athlete	Event	Run 1		Run 2		Total	
Athlete	Event	Time	Rank	Time	Rank	Time	Rank
Evgeniy Timofeev	Men's giant slalom	1:34.65	68	1:37.07	63	3:11.72	61
Evgeniy Timofeev	Men's slalom	1:02.47	73	1:12.96	41	2:15.43	41
