= Carlos Zegarra =

Carlos Zegarra may refer to:

- Carlos Zegarra (footballer)
- Carlos Zegarra (judoka)
