= 2008 Summer Olympics Parade of Nations =

2008 Summer Olympics Parade of Nations was part of the opening ceremony that originating with the 1896 Olympic Games. The national team from each nation participating in the Olympic Games paraded behind their national flag into the Olympic Stadium. The flag bearer was an athlete of each national delegation chosen, to represent the athletes, either by the National Olympic Committee or by the national team.

Announcers in the stadium read off the names of the marching nations in French, English, (the official languages of the Olympics) and Mandarin Chinese with music accompanying the athletes as they marched into the stadium.

The Marshall Islands, Montenegro, and Tuvalu debuted at these Games, and Serbia competed under its name for the first time after the 1912 Summer Olympics. Montenegro and Serbia were previously one country as the State Union of Serbia and Montenegro.

== Parade order ==
Per tradition, Greece entered first as the spiritual home of the Olympic Games, and the host country, China, entered last. All nations in between marched in the order of their names in Chinese, the host country's language.

As Chinese does not have an alphabetical order, the National Olympic Committees were sorted based on stroke count in Simplified Chinese characters. Specifically:

- Characters with fewer strokes march earlier, so Australia (澳大利亚) marched before Zambia (赞比亚) because 澳 has 15 strokes and 赞 has 16 strokes.
- If the initial characters have the same number of strokes, then the stroke orders of the two characters are grouped in the order 橫竖撇捺折 (horizontal/vertical/left falling/right falling/fold). For example, Yemen (也门) marched before Maldives (马尔代夫) because 也 has three strokes in the order ㇆丨㇟ (525), while 马 has three strokes in the order ㇕㇉㇐ (551).
  - Multiple Chinese sources reported that if the initial characters had the same number of strokes, the second characters would be used. However, this is inaccurate as Chad (乍得, stroke count 5-11) marched before Ghana (加纳, stroke count 5-7) because 乍 (stroke order ㇒㇐丨㇐㇐ (31211)) is ordered in front of 加 (stroke order ㇆㇓丨㇕㇐ (53251)).
- If the stroke order groups are still the same, the initial characters tie and the second characters of each nation are used.
  - Excluding identical characters, a tie only occurred once, with The Gambia (冈比亚) and Benin (贝宁). 冈 has four strokes in the order 丨㇆㇒㇏ (2534), and 贝 has four strokes in the order 丨㇕㇓㇏ (2534), so the second characters were used. 比 has 4 strokes and 宁 has 5 strokes, so The Gambia marched before Benin.
  - Note that this differs from GB stroke-based order, which also uses the 橫竖撇捺折 system. Under GB stroke-based order, the comparison between ㇆ and ㇕ would have been the tiebreaker, with ㇕ ordering before ㇆ due to having fewer turns. This would have caused 贝 to be ordered before 冈 instead of the two characters tying, and Benin would have marched before The Gambia.
- If the second characters still have the same number of strokes, then the stroke order groups are used again. For example, Djibouti (吉布提) marched before Kyrgyzstan (吉尔吉斯斯坦) because 布 has five strokes in the order ㇐㇒丨㇆丨 (13252), while 尔 has five strokes in the order ㇒㇖㇚㇒㇔ (35234).
- If the third characters still have the same number of strokes, the stroke order groups are not used and it skips to the fourth character. Excluding identical characters, this only occurred once: the US Virgin Islands (美属维尔京群岛) marched before American Samoa (美属萨摩亚), since 维 and 萨 both have 11 strokes, ㇜ (5) sorting behind ㇐ (1) is ignored, and 尔 (5 strokes) sorts in front of 摩 (15 strokes).
  - This did not occur during the 2022 Winter Olympics, with stroke order groups used throughout and American Samoa marched in front of the US Virgin Islands.

Two nations were ordered based on a different name:

- Macedonia marched under its then-provisional designation "former Yugoslav Republic of Macedonia" (前南斯拉夫马其顿共和国), but was sorted under "Macedonia" (马其顿 Mǎqídùn).
- The United Arab Emirates marched under its short name in Chinese (阿联酋 Āliánqiú), but was sorted under its full name (阿拉伯联合酋长国 Ālābó Liánhé Qiúzhǎngguó).

Three nations marched out of order:

- During the 2000, 2004, and 2006 Olympics, South Korea (韩国) and North Korea (朝鲜民主主义人民共和国) had marched as one team under the Korean Unification Flag. However, during these 2008 Olympics, negotiations failed for political reasons. Despite this, by coincidence in Simplified Chinese, the sort order would have placed North Korea immediately after South Korea, since 韩 and 朝 both have 12 strokes starting with ㇐丨丨㇕ (1225) which no other 12-stroke country starts with. The organizing team left this as-is, but North Korea refused to march next to South Korea and successfully requested to be moved three teams later in the parade order. South Korea marched under its short name "Korea" in French and English.
- Under the original sort order, Israel (以色列) (㇙㇔㇓㇏ (5434)) would have marched immediately after Palestine (巴勒斯坦) (㇕丨㇐㇟ (5215)), but instead marched 22 teams earlier, apparently under the fiction (丨㇔㇓㇏ (2434)) between Vanuatu (瓦努阿图) (㇐㇙㇈㇔ (1554)) and Japan (日本) (丨㇕㇐㇐ (2511)).
  - During the 2022 Winter Olympics in which Palestine did not compete, this did not occur and Israel marched after Pakistan (巴基斯坦), which starts with the same character as Palestine.
- For unknown reasons, Tonga (汤加) marched after Andorra (安道尔) and other nations beginning with 安, even though 汤 (㇔㇔㇀㇡㇒㇒ (441533)) sorts in front of 安 (㇔㇔㇖㇛㇒㇐ (445531)). By comparison, Zimbabwe (津巴布韦) marched in front of Tunisia (突尼斯) as expected, under the same circumstances (津 and 突 both have 9 strokes and begin with a comparison between ㇔㇔㇀ (441) and ㇔㇔㇖ (445)).
- Multiple sources reported that Taiwan (Chinese Taipei) (中华台北) and the Central African Republic (中非) had switched places to prevent Taiwan from marching next to Hong Kong (中国香港), but this is inaccurate as 非 (丨㇐㇐㇐丨㇐㇐㇐ (21112111)) is naturally ordered before 国 (丨㇕㇐㇐丨㇐㇔㇐ (25112141)). Taiwan had originally requested to march under 台 Tái.
  - Zaobao reported that a contingency plan had been set up so that if Central African Republic athletes did not arrive at the opening ceremony, a BOCOG volunteer would still hold the country's placard and march between Taiwan and Hong Kong. However, this is not unusual (for example, the same occurred during the 2016 Summer Olympics parade when athletes from Eritrea did not arrive until after the opening ceremony).

Brunei (文莱 (Wénlái)) was excluded from the Games by the IOC shortly before the Opening Ceremony as no athletes had been registered. One of the published lists of flag bearers was later edited to note this. Brunei athletes would have originally marched 36th between Uzbekistan and Barbados.

== List ==
The following is a list of each country's flag bearer. The list is sorted by the sequence that each nation appeared in the parade of nations. The names are given in their official designations by the IOC, and the Chinese names follow their official designations by the Beijing Organizing Committee for the Olympic Games.

Order	Nation	Chinese name	Pinyin	Flag bearer	Sport
1	Greece	希腊	Xīlà	Ilias Iliadis	Judo
2	Guinea	几内亚	Jīnèiyà	Fatmata Fofanah	Athletics
3	Guinea-Bissau	几内亚比绍	Jīnèiyà Bǐshào	Augusto Midana	Wrestling
4	Turkey	土耳其	Tǔěrqí	Mehmet Özal	Wrestling
5	Turkmenistan	土库曼斯坦	Tǔkùmànsītǎn	Guwanç Nurmuhammedow	Judo
6	Yemen	也门	Yěmén	Mohammed Al-Yafaee	Athletics
7	Maldives	马尔代夫	Mǎěrdàifū	Aminath Rouya Hussain	Swimming
8	Malta	马耳他	Mǎěrtā	Marcon Bezzina	Judo
9	Madagascar	马达加斯加	Mǎdájiāsījiā	Jean de Dieu Soloniaina	Boxing
10	Malaysia	马来西亚	Mǎláixīyà	Azizulhasni Awang	Cycling
11	Mali	马里	Mǎlǐ	Daba Modibo Keita	Taekwondo
12	Malawi	马拉维	Mǎlāwéi	Charlton Nyirenda	Swimming
13	Macedonia	前南斯拉夫马其顿共和国	Qián Nánsīlāfū Mǎqídùn Gònghéguó	Atanas Nikolovski	Canoeing
14	Marshall Islands	马绍尔群岛	Mǎshàoěr Qúndǎo	Waylon Muller	Official
15	Cayman Islands	开曼群岛	Kāimàn Qúndǎo	Ronald Forbes	Athletics
16	Bhutan	不丹	Bùdān	Tashi Peljor	Archery
17	Ecuador	厄瓜多尔	Èguāduōěr	Alexandra Escobar	Weightlifting
18	Eritrea	厄立特里亚	Èlìtélǐyà	Simret Sultan Ghebremichael	Athletics
19	Jamaica	牙买加	Yámǎijiā	Veronica Campbell	Athletics
20	Belgium	比利时	Bǐlìshí	Sébastien Godefroid	Sailing
21	Vanuatu	瓦努阿图	Wǎnǔātú	Priscila Tommy	Table tennis
22	Israel	以色列	Yǐsèliè	Michael Kolganov	Canoeing
23	Japan	日本	Rìběn	Ai Fukuhara	Table tennis
24	Chinese Taipei	中华台北	Zhōnghuá Táiběi	Lai Sheng-Jung	Softball
25	Central African Republic	中非	Zhōngfēi	Mireille Derebona	Athletics
26	Hong Kong	中国香港	Zhōngguó Xiānggǎng	Wong Kam-po	Cycling
27	The Gambia	冈比亚	Gāngbǐyà	Badou Jack	Boxing
28	Benin	贝宁	Bèiníng	Fabienne Feraez	Athletics
29	Mauritius	毛里求斯	Máolǐqiúsī	Stephan Buckland	Athletics
30	Mauritania	毛里塔尼亚	Máolǐtǎníyà	Souleyman Chebal Moctar	Athletics
31	Denmark	丹麦	Dānmài	Joachim Olsen	Athletics
32	Uganda	乌干达	Wūgāndá	Ronald Serugo	Boxing
33	Ukraine	乌克兰	Wūkèlán	Yana Klochkova	Swimming
34	Uruguay	乌拉圭	Wūlāguī	Alejandro Foglia	Sailing
35	Uzbekistan	乌兹别克斯坦	Wūzībiékèsītǎn	Dilshod Makhmudov	Boxing
36	Barbados	巴巴多斯	Bābāduōsī	Bradley Ally	Swimming
37	Papua New Guinea	巴布亚新几内亚	Bābùyà Xīn Jǐnèiyà	Ryan Pini	Swimming
38	Brazil	巴西	Bāxī	Robert Scheidt	Sailing
39	Paraguay	巴拉圭	Bālāguī	Víctor Fatecha	Athletics
40	Bahrain	巴林	Bālín	Rakia Al Gassra	Athletics
41	Bahamas	巴哈马	Bāhāmǎ	Debbie Ferguson	Athletics
42	Panama	巴拿马	Bānámǎ	Jesika Jiménez	Fencing
43	Pakistan	巴基斯坦	Bājīsītǎn	Zeeshan Ashraf	Field hockey
44	Palestine	巴勒斯坦	Bālèsītǎn	Nader Almassri	Athletics
45	Cuba	古巴	Gǔbā	Mijaín López	Wrestling
46	Burkina Faso	布基纳法索	Bùjīnà Fǎsuǒ	Aïssata Soulama	Athletics
47	Burundi	布隆迪	Bùlóngdí	Francine Niyonizigiye	Athletics
48	Timor-Leste	东帝汶	Dōngdìwèn	Mariana Diaz Ximenez	Athletics
49	Qatar	卡塔尔	Kǎtǎěr	Nasser Al-Attiyah	Shooting
50	Rwanda	卢旺达	Lúwàngdá	Pamela Girimbabazi	Swimming
51	Luxembourg	卢森堡	Lúsēnbǎo	Raphaël Stacchiotti	Swimming
52	Chad	乍得	Zhàdé	Hinikissia Albertine Ndikert	Athletics
53	Belarus	白俄罗斯	Báiéluósī	Alexandr Romankov	Fencing
54	India	印度	Yìndù	Rajyavardhan Singh Rathore	Shooting
55	Indonesia	印度尼西亚	Yìndùníxīyà	I Gusti Made Oka Sulaksana	Sailing
56	Lithuania	立陶宛	Lìtáowǎn	Šarūnas Jasikevičius	Basketball
57	Niger	尼日尔	Nírìěr	Mohamed Alhousseini Alhassan	Swimming
58	Nigeria	尼日利亚	Nírìlìyà	Bose Kaffo	Table tennis
59	Nicaragua	尼加拉瓜	Níjiālāguā	Alexis Argüello	Boxing (non-participant)
60	Nepal	尼泊尔	Níbóěr	Deepak Bista	Taekwondo
61	Ghana	加纳	Jiānà	Vida Anim	Athletics
62	Canada	加拿大	Jiānádà	Adam van Koeverden	Canoeing
63	Gabon	加蓬	Jiāpéng	Mélanie Engoang	Judo
64	San Marino	圣马力诺	Shèng Mǎlìnuò	Daniela Del Din	Shooting
65	Saint Vincent and the Grenadines	圣文森特和格林纳丁斯	Shèng Wénsēntè hé Gélínnàdīngsī	Kineke Alexander	Athletics
66	Saint Lucia	圣卢西亚	Shèng Lúxīyà	Levern Spencer	Athletics
67	São Tomé and Príncipe	圣多美和普林西比	Shèng Duōměi hé Pǔlínxībǐ	Celma Bonfim da Graça	Athletics
68	Saint Kitts and Nevis	圣基茨和尼维斯	Shèng Jīcí hé Níwéisī	Virgil Hodge	Athletics
69	Guyana	圭亚那	Guīyànà	Niall Roberts	Swimming
70	Djibouti	吉布提	Jíbùtí	Salah Houssein Ahmed	Athletics (non-participant)
71	Kyrgyzstan	吉尔吉斯斯坦	Jíěrjísīsītǎn	Talant Dzhanagulov	Judo
72	Laos	老挝	Lǎowō	Souksavanh Tonsacktheva	Athletics
73	Armenia	亚美尼亚	Yàměiníyà	Albert Azaryan	Gymnastics
74	Spain	西班牙	Xībānyá	David Cal Figueroa	Canoeing
75	Bermuda	百慕大	Bǎimùdà	Jillian Terceira	Equestrian
76	Liechtenstein	列支敦士登	Lièzhīdūnshìdēng	Marcel Tschopp	Athletics (marathon)
77	Republic of the Congo	刚果（布）	Gāngguǒ (Bù)	Pamela Mouele-Mboussi	Athletics
78	Democratic Republic of the Congo	刚果（金）	Gāngguǒ (Jīn)	Franka Magali	Athletics
79	Iraq	伊拉克	Yīlākè	Hamza Hussein	Rowing
80	Iran	伊朗	Yīlǎng	Homa Hosseini	Rowing
81	Guatemala	危地马拉	Wēidìmǎlā	Kevin Cordón	Badminton
82	Hungary	匈牙利	Xiōngyálì	Zoltán Kammerer	Canoeing
83	Dominican Republic	多米尼加共和国	Duōmǐníjiā Gònghéguó	Félix Sánchez	Athletics
84	Dominica	多米尼克	Duōmǐníkè	Jerome Romain	Athletics
85	Togo	多哥	Duōgē	Benjamin Boukpeti	Canoeing
86	Iceland	冰岛	Bīngdǎo	Örn Arnarson	Swimming
87	Guam	关岛	Guāndǎo	Ricardo Blas Jr.	Judo
88	Angola	安哥拉	Āngēlā	João N'tyamba	Athletics
89	Antigua and Barbuda	安提瓜和巴布达	Āntíguā hé Bābùdá	James Grayman	Athletics
90	Andorra	安道尔	Āndàoěr	Montserrat García Riberaygua	Canoeing
91	Tonga	汤加	Tāngjiā	Ana Po'uhila	Athletics
92	Jordan	约旦	Yuēdàn	Zeina Shaban	Table tennis
93	Equatorial Guinea	赤道几内亚	Chìdào Jīnèiyà	Emilia Mikue Ondo	Athletics
94	Finland	芬兰	Fēnlán	Juha Hirvi	Shooting
95	Croatia	克罗地亚	Kèluódìyà	Ivano Balić	Handball
96	Sudan	苏丹	Sūdān	Abubaker Kaki	Athletics
97	Suriname	苏里南	Sūlǐnán	Anthony Nesty	Swimming
98	Libya	利比亚	Lìbǐyǎ	Mohamed Ben Saleh	Judo
99	Liberia	利比里亚	Lìbǐlǐyà	Jangy Addy	Athletics
100	Belize	伯利兹	Bólìzī	Jonathan Williams	Athletics
101	Cape Verde	佛得角	Fódéjiǎo	Wânia Monteiro	Gymnastics
102	Cook Islands	库克群岛	Kùkè Qúndǎo	Sam Pera Junior	Weightlifting
103	Saudi Arabia	沙特	Shātè	Mohammed Al-Khuwalidi	Athletics
104	Algeria	阿尔及利亚	Āěrjílìyà	Salim Iles	Swimming
105	Albania	阿尔巴尼亚	Āěrbāníyà	Sahit Prizreni	Wrestling
106	United Arab Emirates	阿联酋	Āliánqiú	Maitha bint Mohammed bin Rashid Al Maktoum	Taekwondo
107	Argentina	阿根廷	Āgēntíng	Emanuel Ginóbili	Basketball
108	Oman	阿曼	Āmàn	Dadallah Al-Bulushi	Shooting
109	Aruba	阿鲁巴	Ālǔbā	Fiderd Vis	Judo
110	Afghanistan	阿富汗	Āfùhàn	Nesar Ahmad Bahave	Taekwondo
111	Azerbaijan	阿塞拜疆	Āsāibàijiāng	Farid Mansurov	Wrestling
112	Namibia	纳米比亚	Nàmǐbǐyà	Mannie Heymans	Cycling
113	Tanzania	坦桑尼亚	Tǎnsāngníyà	Fabiano Joseph Naasi	Athletics
114	Latvia	拉脱维亚	Lātuōwéiyà	Vadims Vasiļevskis	Athletics
115	Great Britain	英国	Yīngguó	Mark Foster	Swimming
116	British Virgin Islands	英属维尔京群岛	Yīngshǔ Wéiěrjīng Qúndǎo	Tahesia Harrigan	Athletics
117	Kenya	肯尼亚	Kěnníyà	Grace Momanyi	Athletics
118	Romania	罗马尼亚	Luōmǎníyà	Valeria Bese	Handball
119	Palau	帕劳	Pàláo	Elgin Loren Elwais	Wrestling
120	Tuvalu	图瓦卢	Túwǎlú	Logona Esau	Weightlifting
121	Venezuela	委内瑞拉	Wěinèiruìlā	María Soto	Softball
122	Solomon Islands	所罗门群岛	Suǒluōmén Qúndǎo	Wendy Hale	Weightlifting
123	France	法国	Fǎguó	Tony Estanguet	Canoeing
124	Poland	波兰	Bōlán	Marek Twardowski	Canoeing
125	Puerto Rico	波多黎各	Bōduō Lígè	McWilliams Arroyo	Boxing
126	Bosnia and Herzegovina	波黑	Bōhēi	Amel Mekić	Judo
127	Bangladesh	孟加拉国	Mèngjiālāguó	Rubel Rana	Swimming
128	Bolivia	玻利维亚	Bōlìwéiyà	César Menacho	Shooting
129	Norway	挪威	Nuówēi	Ruth Kasirye	Weightlifting
130	South Africa	南非	Nánfēi	Natalie du Toit	Swimming
131	Cambodia	柬埔寨	Jiǎnpǔzhài	Hem Bunting	Athletics
132	Kazakhstan	哈萨克斯坦	Hāsàkèsītǎn	Bakhyt Akhmetov	Weightlifting
133	Kuwait	科威特	Kēwēitè	Abdullah Alrashidi	Shooting
134	Ivory Coast	科特迪瓦	Kētè Díwǎ	Affoue Amandine Allou	Athletics
135	Comoros	科摩罗	Kēmóluó	Ahamada Feta	Athletics
136	Bulgaria	保加利亚	Bǎojiālìyà	Petar Stoychev	Swimming
137	Russia	俄罗斯	Éluōsī / Éluósī	Andrei Kirilenko	Basketball
138	Syria	叙利亚	Xùlìyà	Ahed Joughili	Weightlifting
139	United States	美国	Měiguó	Lopez Lomong	Athletics
140	Virgin Islands	美属维尔京群岛	Měishǔ Wéiěrjīng Qúndǎo	Josh Laban	Swimming
141	American Samoa	美属萨摩亚	Měishǔ Sàmóyà	Silulu A'etonu	Judo
142	Honduras	洪都拉斯	Hóngdūlāsī	Miguel Ferrera	Taekwondo
143	Zimbabwe	津巴布韦	Jīnbābùwéi	Brian Dzingai	Athletics
144	Tunisia	突尼斯	Tūnísī	Anis Chedly	Judo
145	Thailand	泰国	Tàiguó	Worapoj Petchkoom	Boxing
146	Egypt	埃及	Aījí	Karam Gaber	Wrestling
147	Ethiopia	埃塞俄比亚	Aīsāiébǐyà	Miruts Yefter	Coach
148	Lesotho	莱索托	Láisuǒtuō	Tsotang Maine	Athletics
149	Mozambique	莫桑比克	Mòsāngbǐkè	Kurt Couto	Athletics
150	Netherlands	荷兰	Hélán	Jeroen Delmee	Field hockey
151	Netherlands Antilles	荷属安的列斯	Héshǔ Āndelièsī	Churandy Martina	Athletics
152	Grenada	格林纳达	Gélínnàdá	Alleyne Francique	Athletics
153	Georgia	格鲁吉亚	Gélǔjíyà	Ramaz Nozadze	Wrestling
154	Somalia	索马里	Suǒmǎlǐ	Duran Farah	Chef de mission (non-participant)
155	Colombia	哥伦比亚	Gēlúnbǐyà	María Luisa Calle	Cycling
156	Costa Rica	哥斯达黎加	Gēsīdá Líjiā	Allan Segura	Athletics
157	Trinidad and Tobago	特立尼达和多巴哥	Tèlìnídá hé Duōbāgē	George Bovell III	Swimming
158	Peru	秘鲁	Bìlǔ	Sixto Barrera	Wrestling
159	Ireland	爱尔兰	Aìěrlán	Ciara Peelo	Sailing
160	Estonia	爱沙尼亚	Aìshāníyà	Martin Padar	Judo
161	Haiti	海地	Hǎidì	Joel Brutus	Judo
162	Czech Republic	捷克	Jiékè	Štěpánka Hilgertová	Canoeing
163	Kiribati	基里巴斯	Jīlǐbāsī	David Katoatau	Weightlifting
164	Philippines	菲律宾	Fēilǜbīn	Manny Pacquiao (Note: Miguel Molina was originally chosen, but Philippine President Gloria Macapagal-Arroyo chose Pacquiao to become the flagbearer following his victory over David Díaz.)	Boxing (non-participant)
165	El Salvador	萨尔瓦多	Sàěrwǎduō	Eva Dimas	Weightlifting
166	Samoa	萨摩亚	Sàmóyà	Ele Opeloge	Weightlifting
167	Federated States of Micronesia	密克罗尼西亚联邦	Mìkèluóníxīyà Liánbāng	Manuel Minginfel	Weightlifting
168	Tajikistan	塔吉克斯坦	Tǎjíkèsītǎn	Dilshod Nazarov	Athletics
169	Vietnam	越南	Yuènán	Nguyen Dinh Cuong	Athletics
170	Botswana	博茨瓦纳	Bócíwǎnà	Samantha Paxinos	Swimming
171	Sri Lanka	斯里兰卡	Sīlǐ Lánkǎ	Susanthika Jayasinghe	Athletics
172	Swaziland	斯威士兰	Sīwēishìlán	Temalangeni Dlamini	Athletics
173	Slovenia	斯洛文尼亚	Sīluòwénníyà	Urška Žolnir	Judo
174	Slovakia	斯洛伐克	Sīluòfákè	Elena Kaliská	Canoeing
175	Portugal	葡萄牙	Pútáoyá	Nelson Évora	Athletics
176	South Korea	韩国	Hánguó	Jang Sung-ho	Judo
177	Fiji	斐济	Fěijì	Makelesi Bulikiobo	Athletics
178	Cameroon	喀麦隆	Kāmàilóng	Frank Moussima	Judo
179	Montenegro	黑山	Hēishān	Veljko Uskoković	Water polo
180	North Korea	朝鲜民主主义人民共和国	Cháoxiǎn Mínzhǔzhǔyì Rénmín Gònghéguó	Pang Mun-Il	Athletics (official)
181	Chile	智利	Zhìlì	Fernando González	Tennis
182	Austria	奥地利	Aòdìlì	Hans-Peter Steinacher	Sailing
183	Myanmar	缅甸	Miǎndiàn	Phone Myint Tayzar	Canoeing
184	Switzerland	瑞士	Ruìshì	Roger Federer	Tennis
185	Sweden	瑞典	Ruìdiǎn	Christian Olsson	Athletics
186	Nauru	瑙鲁	Nǎolǔ	Itte Detenamo	Weightlifting
187	Mongolia	蒙古	Měnggǔ	Makhgalyn Bayarjavkhlan	Judo
188	Singapore	新加坡	Xīnjiāpō	Li Jiawei	Table tennis
189	New Zealand	新西兰	Xīn Xīlán	Mahé Drysdale	Rowing
190	Italy	意大利	Yìdàlì	Antonio Rossi	Canoeing
191	Senegal	塞内加尔	Sàinèijiāěr	Bineta Diedhiou	Taekwondo
192	Serbia	塞尔维亚	Sàiěrwéiyà	Jasna Šekarić	Shooting
193	Seychelles	塞舌尔	Sàishéěr	Georgie Cupidon	Badminton
194	Sierra Leone	塞拉利昂	Sàilā Lìáng	Solomon Bayoh	Athletics
195	Cyprus	塞浦路斯	Sàipǔlùsī	George Achilleos	Shooting
196	Mexico	墨西哥	Mòxīgē	Paola Espinosa	Diving
197	Lebanon	黎巴嫩	Líbānèn	Ziad Richa	Shooting
198	Germany	德国	Déguó	Dirk Nowitzki	Basketball
199	Moldova	摩尔多瓦	Móěrduōwǎ	Nicolae Ceban	Wrestling
200	Monaco	摩纳哥	Mónàgē	Mathias Raymond	Rowing
201	Morocco	摩洛哥	Móluògē	Abdelkader Kada	Athletics (coach)
202	Australia	澳大利亚	Àodàlìyǎ	James Tomkins	Rowing
203	Zambia	赞比亚	Zànbǐyà	Hastings Bwalya	Boxing
204	China	中国	Zhōngguó	Yao Ming	Basketball

== See also ==
- 2004 Summer Olympics national flag bearers
- 2008 Summer Paralympics national flag bearers
- 2010 Winter Olympics national flag bearers
- 2022 Winter Olympics national flag bearers
