= GB 13000 =

GB 13000.1 is a Guobiao standard of the People's Republic of China corresponding to ISO/IEC 10646. "GB 13000" or "GB 13000.1" may refer to:

- Universal Coded Character Set (UCS; ISO/IEC 10646) or Unicode (synchronised with UCS)
- GBK (character encoding), defined as an annex to GB 13000.1-93.
- GB stroke-based order, full name "GB13000.1 Character Set Chinese Character Order (Stroke-Based Order)", a collation order defined by the National Language Commission of China for the Chinese characters in Unicode at the time

== See also ==
- GB 18030
