= Carlos Zegarra (judoka) =

Peruvian judoka (born 1984)

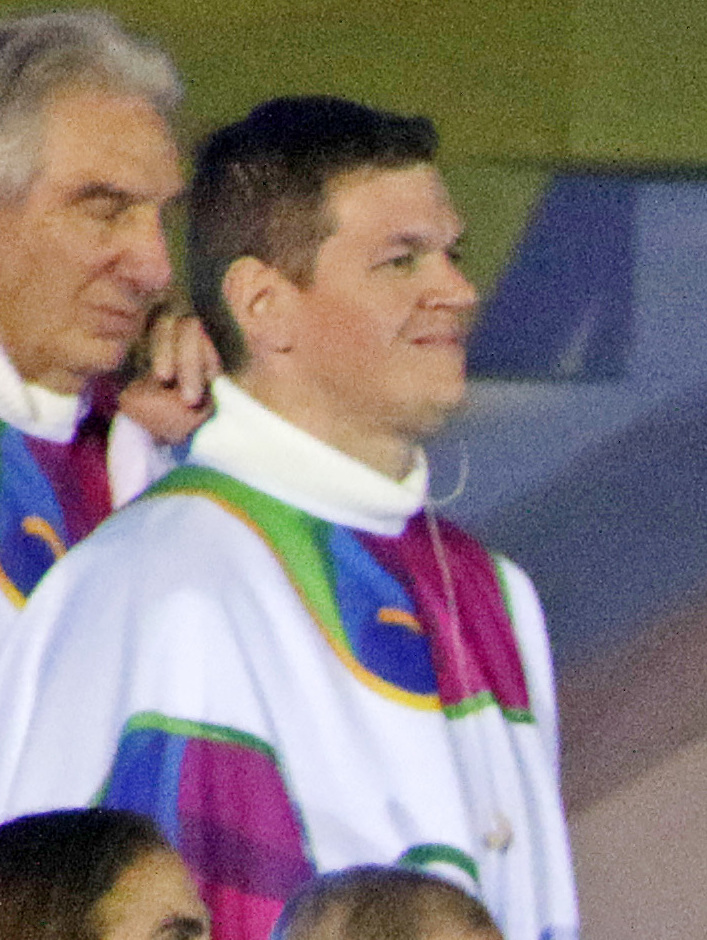
- Carlos Zegarra in 2019.

Personal information
- Full name: Carlos Erick Zegarra Presser
- Nationality: Peru
- Born: 1 September 1984 (age 41) Lima, Peru
- Height: 2.08 m (6 ft 10 in)
- Weight: 165 kg (364 lb)

Sport
- Sport: Judo
- Event: +100 kg
Medal record
Men's judo
Representing Peru
Pan American Games
Bronze medal – third place	2007 Rio de Janeiro	+100 kg

Carlos Erick Zegarra Presser (born September 1, 1984 in Lima) is a Peruvian judoka, who played for the heavyweight category. He won a bronze medal for his division at the 2007 Pan American Games in Rio de Janeiro, Brazil. Zegarra stands 2.08 metres (6 ft 10 in) tall and weighs 165 kilograms (364 lb).

Zegarra represented Peru at the 2008 Summer Olympics in Beijing, where he competed for the men's heavyweight class (+100 kg). He defeated Argentina's Sandro López in the second preliminary round, before losing out his next match, by an ippon and a yoko shiho gatame, to Cuban judoka and Pan American Games champion Óscar Brayson. Because his opponent advanced further into the semi-finals, Zegarra offered another shot for the bronze medal by entering the repechage rounds. Unfortunately, he was defeated in the first repechage bout by Lebanon's Rudy Hachache, who successfully scored a waza-ari awasete ippon (two full points) and a soto makikomi (outer wraparound), at one minute and fifty-five seconds.
