= Yevgen Sotnikov =

Ukrainian judoka (1980–2021)

Personal information
- Born: 20 November 1980
- Died: 6 August 2021 (aged 40)
- Occupation: Judoka

Sport
- Country: Ukraine
- Sport: Judo
- Weight class: +100 kg

Achievements and titles
- Olympic Games: R32 (2008)
- World Champ.: (bronze) (2003)
- European Champ.: (silver) (2006)
Medal record
Men's judo
Representing Ukraine
World Championships
Bronze medal – third place	2003 Osaka	+100 kg
European Championships
Silver medal – second place	2006 Novi Sad	Open
Bronze medal – third place	2008 Lisbon	+100 kg

Profile at external databases
- IJF: 52704
- JudoInside.com: 11241
- Updated on 16 November 2022

Yevgen Sotnikov (Ukrainian: Євген Сотников; 20 November 1980 – 6 August 2021) was a Ukrainian judoka. Sotnikov competed at the 2008 Olympic Games, where he was knocked out after one match.

Sotnikov was sentenced to 15 years for murder in 2009 for shooting an 18-year-old in the head for refusing to drink alcohol with him.

Sotnikov was killed on 6 August 2021, alongside two other prisoners, while serving his jail term. He was aged 40. According to Trilateral Contact Group member Haide Rizayeva Sotnikov was killed in a penal colony of the self-proclaimed Ukrainian breakaway state Donetsk People's Republic.

== Achievements ==
Year	Tournament	Place	Weight class
2008	European Championships	3rd	Heavyweight (+100 kg)
2007	European Judo Championships	7th	Heavyweight (+100 kg)
2006	European Judo Championships	5th	Heavyweight (+100 kg)
2006	European Open Championships	2nd	Open class
2003	World Judo Championships	3rd	Heavyweight (+100 kg)

== See also ==
- List of Ukrainian sports figures killed during the Russo-Ukrainian war
