= Kyrgyzstan at the 2010 Winter Olympics =

- IOC code: KGZ
- NOC: National Olympic Committee of the Republic of Kyrgyzstan

in Vancouver
- Competitors: 2 in 2 sports
- Flag bearer: Dmitry Trelevski
- Medals: Gold 0 Silver 0 Bronze 0 Total 0

Winter Olympics appearances (overview)
- 1994; 1998; 2002; 2006; 2010; 2014; 2018; 2022; 2026; 2030

Other related appearances
- Soviet Union (1956–1988)

Kyrgyzstan sent a delegation to compete in the 2010 Winter Olympics in Vancouver, British Columbia, Canada from 12–28 February 2010. The Kyrgyzstani delegation consisted of two athletes, alpine skier Dmitry Trelevski and cross-country skier Olga Reshetkova. The best performance in any event by the delegation was Reshetkova's 54th place in the women's sprint.

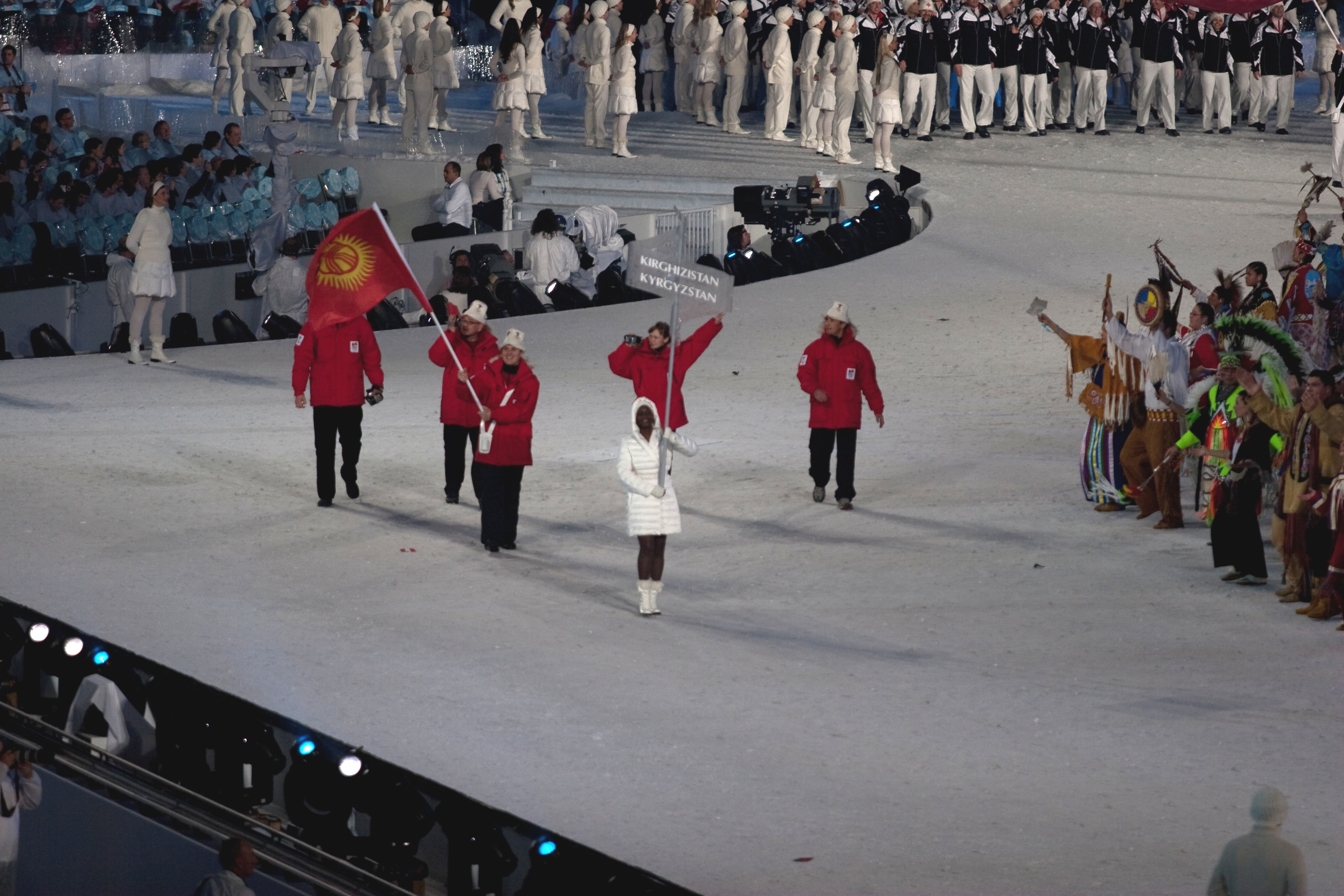
The athletes entering the stadium during the opening ceremonies.

== Background ==
Following the Dissolution of the Soviet Union in 1991, the National Olympic Committee of the Republic of Kyrgyzstan was recognized by the International Olympic Committee on 1 January 1993. Kyrgyzstan has participated in every Winter Olympics since the 1994 Lillehammer Games, and every Summer Olympics since the 1996 Atlanta Games. For the 2010 Vancouver Olympics, the Kyrgyzstani delegation consisted of two athletes, alpine skier Dmitry Trelevski and cross-country skier Olga Reshetkova. Trelevski was chosen as the flag bearer for both the opening ceremony and the closing ceremony.

== Alpine skiing ==
Dmitry Trelevski was 26 years old at the time of the Vancouver Olympics. On 23 February, he competed in the giant slalom, where he posted run times of 1 minute and 31 seconds and 1 minute and 36 seconds. Results were determined by adding the two run times together, and his total time of 3 minutes and 8 seconds placed him in 76th position. This was a little over 30 seconds behind the gold medal time. On 27 February he participated in the slalom, but failed to finish the first run.

Athlete	Event	Run 1	Run 2	Total	Rank
Dmitry Trelevski	Men's giant slalom	1:31.61	1:36.40	3:08.01	76
Dmitry Trelevski	Men's slalom	DNF			

== Cross-country skiing ==
Olga Reshetkova was 28 years old at the time of these Olympics. On 15 February, she took part in the sprint race, and finished with a time of 4 minutes and 32 seconds, which put her in last place, and 42 seconds behind the lowest position to qualify for the next round.

Athlete	Event	Qualifying		Quarterfinal		Semifinal		Final	
Athlete	Event	Total	Rank	Total	Rank	Total	Rank	Total	Rank
Olga Reshetkova	Women's sprint	4:32.96	54	DNQ					
