= Kyrgyzstan at the 2008 Summer Olympics =

- IOC code: KGZ
- NOC: National Olympic Committee of the Republic of Kyrgyzstan

in Beijing
- Competitors: 21 in 10 sports
- Flag bearers: Talant Dzhanagulov (opening); Bazar Bazarguruev (closing)
- Medals Ranked 64th: Gold 0 Silver 1 Bronze 2 Total 3

Summer Olympics appearances (overview)
- 1996; 2000; 2004; 2008; 2012; 2016; 2020; 2024

Other related appearances
- Russian Empire (1900–1912); Soviet Union (1952–1988); Unified Team (1992)

Kyrgyzstan competed in the 2008 Summer Olympics, held in Beijing, People's Republic of China from August 8 to August 24, 2008.

== Medalists ==
Medal	Name	Sport	Event
Silver	Kanatbek Begaliev	Wrestling	Men's Greco-Roman 66 kg
Bronze	Ruslan Tyumenbayev	Wrestling	Men's Greco-Roman 60 kg
Bronze	Bazar Bazarguruev	Wrestling	Men's freestyle 60 kg

== Athletics ==
Key

- Note–Ranks given for track events are within the athlete's heat only
- Q = Qualified for the next round
- q = Qualified for the next round as a fastest loser or, in field events, by position without achieving the qualifying target
- NR = National record
- N/A = Round not applicable for the event
- Bye = Athlete not required to compete in round

Men
Track & road events

Athlete	Event	Heat		Semifinal		Final	
Athlete	Event	Result	Rank	Result	Rank	Result	Rank
Sergey Pakura	800 m	1:50.54	7	Did not advance			
Aleksey Pogorelov	400 m hurdles	51.47	6	Did not advance			

Women
Track & road events

Athlete	Event	Heat		Semifinal		Final	
Athlete	Event	Result	Rank	Result	Rank	Result	Rank
Iuliia Andreeva	Marathon	—				2:44:41	58
Galina Pedan	400 m hurdles	1:00.31	7	Did not advance			

Field events

Athlete	Event	Qualification		Final	
Athlete	Event	Distance	Position	Distance	Position
Tatiana Efimenko	High jump	NM	—	Did not advance	

== Boxing ==
Kyrgyzstan qualified one boxer for the Olympic boxing tournament. Asylbek Talasbayev qualified in the lightweight class at the second Asian tournament.

Athlete	Event	Round of 32	Round of 16	Quarterfinals	Semifinals	Final	
Athlete	Event	Opposition Result	Opposition Result	Opposition Result	Opposition Result	Opposition Result	Rank
Asylbek Talasbayev	Lightweight	Lopes (BRA); W 9–7	Pérez (COL); L 4–15	Did not advance			

== Fencing ==
Men

Athlete	Event	Round of 64	Round of 32	Round of 16	Quarterfinal	Semifinal	Final / BM	
Athlete	Event	Opposition Score	Opposition Score	Opposition Score	Opposition Score	Opposition Score	Opposition Score	Rank
Serguei Katchiourine	Individual épée	Jeannet (FRA); L 14–15	did not advance					

== Judo ==
Athlete	Event	Preliminary	Round of 32	Round of 16	Quarterfinals	Semifinals	Repechage 1	Repechage 2	Repechage 3	Final / BM	
Athlete	Event	Opposition Result	Opposition Result	Opposition Result	Opposition Result	Opposition Result	Opposition Result	Opposition Result	Opposition Result	Opposition Result	Rank
Talant Dzhanagulov	Men's +100 kg	Bye	Pan S (CHN); L 0001–1001	Did not advance							
Elena Proskurakova	Women's −78 kg	—	Yang Xl (CHN); L 0000–1000	Did not advance			Lkhamdegd (MGL); L 0000–0230	Did not advance			

== Shooting ==
Men

Athlete	Event	Qualification		Final	
Athlete	Event	Points	Rank	Points	Rank
Ruslan Ismailov	10 m air rifle	587	39	Did not advance	
Ruslan Ismailov	50 m rifle prone	578	54	Did not advance	
Ruslan Ismailov	50 m rifle 3 positions	1130	48	Did not advance	

== Swimming ==
Men

Athlete	Event	Heat		Semifinal		Final	
Athlete	Event	Time	Rank	Time	Rank	Time	Rank
Vasilii Danilov	400 m individual medley	4:29.20	27	—		Did not advance	
Vitaly Vasilyev	50 m freestyle	24.02	55	Did not advance			
Iurii Zakharov	200 m individual medley	2:07.01	45	Did not advance			

== Taekwondo ==
Athlete	Event	Round of 16	Quarterfinals	Semifinals	Repechage	Bronze medal	Final	
Athlete	Event	Opposition Result	Opposition Result	Opposition Result	Opposition Result	Opposition Result	Opposition Result	Rank
Rasul Abduraim	Men's −68 kg	Manz (GER); L 0–1	Did not advance					

== Weightlifting ==
Athlete	Event	Snatch		Clean & jerk		Total	Rank
Athlete	Event	Result	Rank	Result	Rank	Total	Rank
Ulanbek Moldodosov	Men's −85 kg	152	12	194	11	346	11

== Wrestling ==
Key:

- VT - Victory by Fall.
- PP - Decision by Points - the loser with technical points.
- PO - Decision by Points - the loser without technical points.

Men's freestyle

Athlete	Event	Qualification	Round of 16	Quarterfinal	Semifinal	Repechage 1	Repechage 2	Final / BM	
Athlete	Event	Opposition Result	Opposition Result	Opposition Result	Opposition Result	Opposition Result	Opposition Result	Opposition Result	Rank
Bazar Bazarguruev	−60 kg	Bye	Prizreni (ALB); W 5–0 ^{PO}	Fedoryshyn (UKR); L 0–3 ^{PO}	Did not advance	Bye	Zadick (USA); W 3–0 ^{PO}	Yumoto (JPN); L 0–3 ^{PO}	3rd place, bronze medalist(s)
Arsen Gitinov	−74 kg	Brzozowski (POL); W 3–1 ^{PP}	Aldatov (UKR); W 3–1 ^{PP}	Terziev (BUL); L 0–5 ^{VT}	Did not advance				8
Aleksey Krupnyakov	−96 kg	Bye	Gogshelidze (GEO); L 0–3 ^{PO}	Did not advance					16

Men's Greco-Roman

Athlete	Event	Qualification	Round of 16	Quarterfinal	Semifinal	Repechage 1	Repechage 2	Final / BM	
Athlete	Event	Opposition Result	Opposition Result	Opposition Result	Opposition Result	Opposition Result	Opposition Result	Opposition Result	Rank
Ruslan Tyumenbayev	−60 kg	Bye	Ala-Huikku (FIN); W 3–1 ^{PP}	Aripov (UZB); W 3–1 ^{PP}	Albiev (RUS); L 0–3 ^{PO}	Bye		Monzón (CUB); W 3–0 ^{PO}	3rd place, bronze medalist(s)
Kanatbek Begaliev	−66 kg	Bye	Deitchler (USA); W 3–1 ^{PP}	Vardanyan (UKR); W 3–1 ^{PP}	Gergov (BUL); W 3–1 ^{PP}	Bye		Guénot (FRA); L 0–3 ^{PO}	2nd place, silver medalist(s)
