= Kyrgyzstan at the 2026 Winter Olympics =

- Flag of Kyrgyzstan
- IOC code: KGZ
- NOC: National Olympic Committee of the Republic of Kyrgyzstan

in Milan and Cortina d'Ampezzo, Italy 6 February 2026 – 22 February 2026
- Competitors: 2 (2 men) in 2 sports
- Flag bearer (opening): Artur Saparbekov
- Flag bearer (closing): Volunteer
- Medals: Gold 0 Silver 0 Bronze 0 Total 0

Winter Olympics appearances (overview)
- 1994; 1998; 2002; 2006; 2010; 2014; 2018; 2022; 2026

Other related appearances
- Soviet Union (1956–1988)

Kyrgyzstan competed at the 2026 Winter Olympics in Milan and Cortina d'Ampezzo, Italy, from 6 to 22 February 2026. This edition of the Games marked Kyrgyzstan's ninth appearance at the Winter Olympics. The Kyrgyz team consisted of two male skiers. Artur Saparbekov was the country's flagbearer during the opening ceremony, while a volunteer was the flagbearer during the closing ceremony. The country did not win a medal at the Games, and has never won a Winter Olympics medal.

== Background ==
The National Olympic Committee of the Kyrgyz Republic (NOC) was founded in 1991 and recognized by the International Olympic Committee in 1993. While Kyrgyz athletes competed as a part of the Soviet Union since 1952 Summer Olympics, Kyrgyzstan made its Olympic debut as an independent nation at the 1994 Winter Olympics held in Lillehammer.

The 2026 Winter Olympics was held in Milan and Cortina d'Ampezzo, Italy, from 6 to 22 February 2026. This edition of the Games marked Kyrgyzstan's ninth appearance at the Winter Olympics. The Kyrgyz delegation consisted of two skiers. Cross-country skier Artur Saparbekov was the country's flagbearer during the opening ceremony. A volunteer served as the flag-bearer during the closing ceremony. The country did not win a medal at the Games, and has never won a Winter Olympics medal.

== Competitors ==
The Kyrgyz contingent consisted of two athletes competing in two sports.

Sport	Men	Women	Total
Alpine skiing	1	0	1
Cross-country skiing	1	0	1
Total	2	0	2

== Alpine skiing ==
The basic qualification mark for the giant slalom and slalom events stipulated an average of less than 120 points in the list published by the International Ski Federation (FIS) as on 18 January 2026. The points were calculated using the average of an athlete's five best results during the qualification period from 1 July 2024 to 18 January 2026. The quotas were allocated further based on athletes satisfying other criteria with a maximum of 22 athletes (11 male and 11 female athletes) from a single participating National Olympic Committee.

Kyrgyzstan qualified one male alpine skier, and Timur Shakirov represented the nation at the Games. Shakirov was born on 20 June 2006 in Karakol. He started competing in international events in 2022, and has represented Kyrgyzstan at two World Championships. He took part in the 2024 Winter Youth Olympics in Gangwon, South Korea, where he competed in the super-G, giant slalom, slalom and alpine combined events. The 2026 edition was his first appearance at the Winter Olympics.

Shakirov competed in the men's giant slalom on 14 February 2026 at the Stelvio Ski Centre in Bormio. He recorded a time of 1:29.52 in his first run and was ranked 67th among the 80 competitors. He completed his second run in 1:22.50 to finish 63rd. With a combined time of 2:52.02, he was placed 62nd overall. On 16 February 2026, Shakirov participated in the men's slalom event at the same venue. He did not finish his first run and was not classified in the final table.

Athlete	Event	Run 1		Run 2		Total	
Athlete	Event	Time	Rank	Time	Rank	Time	Rank
Timur Shakirov	Men's giant slalom	1:29.52	67	1:22.50	63	2:52.02	62
Timur Shakirov	Men's slalom	DNF					

== Cross-country skiing ==
As per the qualification system for cross-country skiing was established by the International Ski and Snowboard Federation (FIS), an athlete who has less than 150.00 FIS Distance points on the list published on 19 January 2026, was eligible to be entered in the distance and/or sprint events. For athletes who have not met the standard, they were eligible to compete in the distance events provided they had less than 350.00 FIS Distance points. A maximum of 16 athletes per nation were allowed to compete with a maximum of eight per gender and a cap of four per event.

Kyrgyzstan qualified one male cross-country skier through the basic quota, and Artur Saparbekov represented the nation. Saparbekov was born on 2 May 2006 in Bishkek. He started competing internationally in 2022 and previously competed at the 2024 Winter Youth Olympics in Gangwon, where he participated in the men's sprint and finished 60th. The 2026 edition marked his first appearance at the Winter Olympics.

The men's sprint qualification round was held on 10 February 2026 at the Tesero Cross-Country Skiing Stadium. He completed the course in 4:36.85, finishing 94th and last and failed to advance to the quarter-finals. In the men's 10 km freestyle event held on 13 February 2026, he recorded a time of 27:46.9. He finishing 102nd among the 113 competitors, nearly seven minutes and 10.7 seconds behind the winner, Johannes Høsflot Klæbo of Norway.

Distance

Athlete	Event	Final		
Athlete	Event	Time	Deficit	Rank
Artur Saparbekov	Men's 10 km freestyle	27:46.9	+7:10.7	102

Sprint

Athlete	Event	Qualification		Quarterfinal		Semifinal		Final	
Athlete	Event	Time	Rank	Time	Rank	Time	Rank	Time	Rank
Artur Saparbekov	Men's sprint	4:36.85	94	Did not advance					
