= Kyrgyzstan at the Olympics =

- IOC code: KGZ
- NOC: National Olympic Committee of the Republic of Kyrgyzstan
- Medals Ranked 120th: Gold 0 Silver 5 Bronze 8 Total 13

Summer appearances
- 1996; 2000; 2004; 2008; 2012; 2016; 2020; 2024; 2028

Winter appearances
- 1994; 1998; 2002; 2006; 2010; 2014; 2018; 2022; 2026

Other related appearances
- Russian Empire (1900–1912); Soviet Union (1952–1988); Unified Team (1992)

Kyrgyzstan has appeared in seven Summer Games and seven Winter Games as an independent state and has won 13 medals. It was previously represented by the Soviet Union team. In 1992, Kyrgyzstan competed as a part of the Unified Team, following the break up of the Soviet Union. Kyrgyzstan made its first appearance as an independent nation in the 1994 Winter Olympics and the 1996 Summer Olympics.

== Medal tables ==
=== Medals by Summer Games ===
Games	Athletes	Gold	Silver	Bronze	Total	Rank
1900–1912	as part of the Russian Empire					
1920–1948	did not participate					
1952–1988	as part of the Soviet Union					
1992 Barcelona	as part of the Unified Team					
1996 Atlanta	33	0	0	0	0	–
2000 Sydney	48	0	0	1	1	71
2004 Athens	29	0	0	0	0	–
2008 Beijing	21	0	1	2	3	64
2012 London	14	0	0	0	0	–
2016 Rio de Janeiro	19	0	0	0	0	–
2020 Tokyo	17	0	2	1	3	70
2024 Paris	16	0	2	4	6	68
2028 Los Angeles	future event					
2032 Brisbane	future event					
Total		0	5	8	13	120

=== Medals by Winter Games ===
Games	Athletes	Gold	Silver	Bronze	Total	Rank
1956–1988	as part of the Soviet Union					
1992 Albertville	as part of the Unified Team					
1994 Lillehammer	1	0	0	0	0	–
1998 Nagano	1	0	0	0	0	–
2002 Salt Lake City	2	0	0	0	0	–
2006 Turin	1	0	0	0	0	–
2010 Vancouver	2	0	0	0	0	–
2014 Sochi	1	0	0	0	0	–
2018 Pyeongchang	2	0	0	0	0	–
2022 Beijing	1	0	0	0	0	–
2026 Milano Cortina	2	0	0	0	0	–
2030 French Alps	future event					
2034 Utah	future event					
Total		0	0	0	0	–

=== Medals by summer sport ===
Sport	Gold	Silver	Bronze	Total
Wrestling	0	4	7	11
Boxing	0	1	0	1
Judo	0	0	1	1
Totals (3 entries)	0	5	8	13

== List of medalists ==
Medal	Name	Games	Sport	Event
Bronze	Aidyn Smagulov	2000 Sydney	Judo	Men's 60 kg
Silver	Kanatbek Begaliev	2008 Beijing	Wrestling	Men's Greco-Roman 66 kg
Bronze	Ruslan Tyumenbayev	2008 Beijing	Wrestling	Men's Greco-Roman 60 kg
Bronze	Bazar Bazarguruev	2008 Beijing	Wrestling	Men's freestyle 60 kg
Silver	Akzhol Makhmudov	2020 Tokyo	Wrestling	Men's Greco-Roman 77 kg
Silver	Aisuluu Tynybekova	2020 Tokyo	Wrestling	Women's freestyle 62 kg
Bronze	Meerim Zhumanazarova	2020 Tokyo	Wrestling	Women's freestyle 68 kg
Silver	Meerim Zhumanazarova	2024 Paris	Wrestling	Women's freestyle 68 kg
Bronze	Akzhol Makhmudov	2024 Paris	Wrestling	Men's Greco-Roman 77 kg
Bronze	Zholaman Sharshenbekov	2024 Paris	Wrestling	Men's Greco-Roman 60 kg
Bronze	Uzur Dzhuzupbekov	2024 Paris	Wrestling	Men's Greco-Roman 97 kg
Bronze	Aisuluu Tynybekova	2024 Paris	Wrestling	Women's Freestyle 62 kg
Silver	Munarbek Seiitbek Uulu	2024 Paris	Boxing	Men's 57 kg

== Disqualified Medalists ==
Medal	Name	Games	Sport	Event
Bronze	Izzat Artykov	2016 Rio de Janeiro	Weightlifting	Men's 69 kg

== See also ==
- List of flag bearers for Kyrgyzstan at the Olympics
