= Daniel McCormick (judoka) =

American judoka

Medal record

Representing United States

Men's judo

Pan American Judo Championships
Bronze medal – third place	2010 San Salvador	+ 100 kg

Daniel "Dan" McCormick (born May 30, 1986) is a judoka from the United States who competed in the 2008 Summer Olympics.
