= Evgeniy Timofeev =

Kyrgyzstani alpine skier (born 1994)

Personal information
- Born: 16 October 1994 (age 31) Bishkek, Kyrgyzstan
- Height: 178 cm (5 ft 10 in) (2025)
- Weight: 79 kg (174 lb) (2025)

Sport
- Country: Kyrgyzstan
- Sport: Alpine skiing

Evgeniy Mikhailovich Timofeev (Russian: Евгений Михайлович Тимофеев; born 16 October 1994) is an alpine skier from Kyrgyzstan. He competed for Kyrgyzstan at the 2014 Winter Olympics in the slalom and giant slalom. He was the only Kyrgyzstani athlete in Sochi. He was born in Bishkek.

Timofeev was not selected for the team. Alpine skier Dmitry Trelevski was selected as the only athlete, however on February 12 during training runs Trelevski was injured seriously, that he had to withdraw from the competition. The National Olympic Committee replaced Dmitry Trelevski with Evgeniy Timofeev after petitioning the International Olympic Committee.

In January 2017, Timofeev was named to Kyrgyzstan's 2017 Asian Winter Games team.

In February 2018, Timofeev again represented Kyrgyzstan in the Pyeongchang Winter Olympics, racing the Giant Slalom.

He also competed for Kyrgyzstan at the 2025 Asian Winter Games.
