= Sandro López =

Argentine judoka

Personal information
- Full name: Sandro Luis López Olmos
- Nationality: Argentina
- Born: 26 October 1967 (age 58) Rosario, Santa Fe, Argentina
- Height: 1.90 m (6 ft 3 in)
- Weight: 120 kg (265 lb)

Sport
- Sport: Judo
- Event: +100 kg

Sandro Luis López Olmos (born October 26, 1967, in Rosario, Santa Fe) is an Argentine judoka, who played for the heavyweight category. He also competed in the middleweight division at the 1988 Summer Olympics in Seoul, South Korea, and at the 1992 Summer Olympics in Barcelona, Spain.

At age forty, Lopez made an official comeback from his sixteen-year absence and his third appearance at the 2008 Summer Olympics in Beijing. He switched from a heavier class by competing in the men's heavyweight class (+100 kg). Unfortunately, he lost the first preliminary match, with an ippon and a yoko shiho gatame (side four quarter hold), to Peru's Carlos Zegarra.
