= Stroke Orders of the Commonly Used Standard Chinese Characters =

Standard stroke orders of PRC

Stroke Orders of the Commonly Used Standard Chinese Characters (simplified Chinese: 通用规范汉字笔顺规范; traditional Chinese: 通用規範漢字筆順規範; pinyin: tōngyòng guīfàn hànzì bǐshùn guīfàn) is a language standard jointly published by the Ministry of Education and the National Language Commission of China in November, 2020.

This new standard has replaced Standard stroke orders of commonly used characters in modern Chinese (现代汉语通用字笔顺规范) as the current effective standard.

== Scope ==
This standard stipulates the stroke orders for the 8,105 characters in the List of Commonly Used Standard Chinese Characters. and can be used for Chinese character information processing, publishing and printing, reference book compilation, etc. It can also be used for teaching and research of Chinese characters.

== Formulating principles ==
=== Principle of stability ===
The standard inherits the developmental criteria of the previous standards on stroke order, and carries on the rules of stroke order of the Standard stroke orders of commonly used characters in modern Chinese (现代汉语通用字笔顺规范) and the Standard stroke orders of GB13000.1 Chinese character set (GB13000.1字符集汉字笔顺规范).

=== Principle of systematicity ===
In addition to following the rules of stroke order, the new standard makes comprehensive reference to the other relevant standards, such as Standard of GB13000.1 character set Chinese character order (stroke-based order) (GB13000.1字符集汉字字序(笔画序)规范 ) and Standard of Chinese character bending strokes of the GB13000.1 character set (GB13000.1 字符集汉字折笔规范). The stroke-based orders adopted is consistent with the previous relevant standards.

=== Principle of practicality ===
Based on application, in the range of modern standard Chinese characters, the standard stipulates stroke orders according to the forms of modern Chinese characters, after sufficient survey on the needs of retrieving, sorting, teaching and writing of modern Chinese characters.

== Explanation ==
- This table (通用规范汉字笔顺表) stipulates the stroke orders for all the 8,105 commonly used standard Chinese characters. The stroke order of each character is represented in two modes of (a) the following mode: the character is written out stroke by stroke; (b) the numbering mode: the strokes are represented by 1, 2, 3, 4 and 5, the serial numbers of the main strokes of "heng (1, 一), shu (2, 丨), pie (3, 丿), dian (4, 丶), and zhe (5, 𠃍)".
- The character forms of the table are based on the Commonly used standard Chinese characters.
- The 8,105 characters of the present table are sorted by the Standard of GB13000.1 Character Set Chinese Character Order (Stroke-Based Order), keeping the hierarchical serial numbers of the table of Commonly used standard Chinese characters.
- This table also provides the international standard codes of ISO/IEC 10646 (Information Technology—Universal Coded Character Set), or UCS, i.e., Unicode.

== Table ==
Available on the Web at URL of "http://www.moe.gov.cn/jyb_sjzl/ziliao/A19/202103/W020210318300204215237.pdf", for a book of 575 pages in PDF format.

== See also ==
- Stroke order
- Chinese character strokes
