= Makhgalyn Bayarjavkhlan =

Mongolian judoka (born 1978)

Personal information
- Nationality: Mongolian
- Born: Makhgalyn Bayarjavkhlan; 18 June 1978 (age 48) Nömreg, Zavkhan, Mongolia
- Height: 1.95 m (6 ft 5 in)
- Weight: 131 kg (289 lb)

Sport
- Country: Mongolia
- Sport: Judo
- Event: +100 kg

Makhgalyn Bayarjavkhlan (Mongolian: Махгалын Баяржавхлан; born 18 June 1978 in Nömreg sum, Zavkhan aimag) is a Mongolian judoka who competed in the super heavyweight division (+100 kg). He was also the nation's flag bearer at the opening ceremony in the 2008 Summer Olympics. Before the Games started, Makhgal competed at the 2008 Asian Judo Championships, where he placed seventh in the super heavyweight division.

During the competition, Makhgal lost in the first round of the men's super heavyweight division, after Janusz Wojnarowicz (Poland) scored an ippon (a full one point) within a time of 24 seconds.
