= Ivan Borisov (alpine skier) =

Kyrgyzstani alpine skier (born 1979)

Personal information
- Nationality: Kyrgyzstani
- Born: 4 March 1979 (age 46); Bishkek, Soviet Union

Sport
- Sport: Alpine skiing

Ivan Borisov (born 4 March 1979) is a Kyrgyzstani former alpine skier. He competed in two events at the 2006 Winter Olympics.
