= Rudy Hachache =

Lebanese Olympic judoka

Personal information
- Nationality: Lebanon
- Born: 27 September 1979 (age 46)

Sport
- Sport: Judo
- Event: +100 kg
Medal record
Men's judo
Representing Lebanon
Asian Championships
Bronze medal – third place	2008 Jeju City	+100 kg

Rudy Hachache (Arabic: رودي حشاش; born September 27, 1979) is a Lebanese judoka who competed in the super heavyweight division (+100 kg) and open class. Hachache qualified for the men's +100 kg at the 2008 Summer Olympics in Beijing, after winning the bronze medal at the Asian Judo Championships in Jeju City, South Korea. He was eliminated in the first preliminary round, after being defeated by Cuba's Óscar Brayson, who eventually won the bronze medal. However, Hachache was given a second chance of a bronze medal triumph by participating in the repechage bouts. He first defeated Peru's Carlos Zegarra in the first round, but lost to Brazil's João Schlittler, who scored an ippon to end the four-minute period, in the second round.
