= Talant Dzhanagulov =

Kyrgyzstani judoka

Personal information
- Nationality: Kyrgyzstani
- Born: Talant Rysbekovich Dzhanagulov; 17 October 1989 (age 36) Frunze, Kirghiz SSR, Soviet Union
- Height: 1.75 m (5 ft 9 in)
- Weight: 129 kg (284 lb)

Sport
- Country: Kyrgyzstan
- Sport: Judo
- Event: +100 kg

Talant Rysbekovich Dzhanagulov (Russian: Талант Рысбекович Джанагулов; born 17 October 1989) is a Kyrgyzstani judoka who competed in the super heavyweight division (+100 kg). He was also the nation's flag bearer at the opening ceremony in the 2008 Summer Olympics.

Olympic Games
Preceded by Mital Sharipov	Flagbearer for Kyrgyzstan; Beijing 2008	Succeeded by Chingiz Mamedov
