= Pablo Figueroa =

Puerto Rican judoka (born 1981)

Personal information
- Born: 27 October 1981 (age 44)

Sport
- Sport: Judo
Medal record
Representing Puerto Rico
Men's judo
Pan American Games
Bronze medal – third place	2011 Guadalajara	+100 kg
Central American and Caribbean Games
Silver medal – second place	2010 Mayaguez	+100 kg
Bronze medal – third place	2010 Mayaguez	Team
Pan American Judo Championships
Bronze medal – third place	2010 San Salvador	+ 100 kg

Pablo Figueroa Carillo (born October 27, 1981) is male judoka from Puerto Rico. He competed at the 2008 Summer Olympics
