= Maxim Gordeev =

Kyrgyzstani alpine skier (born 1995)

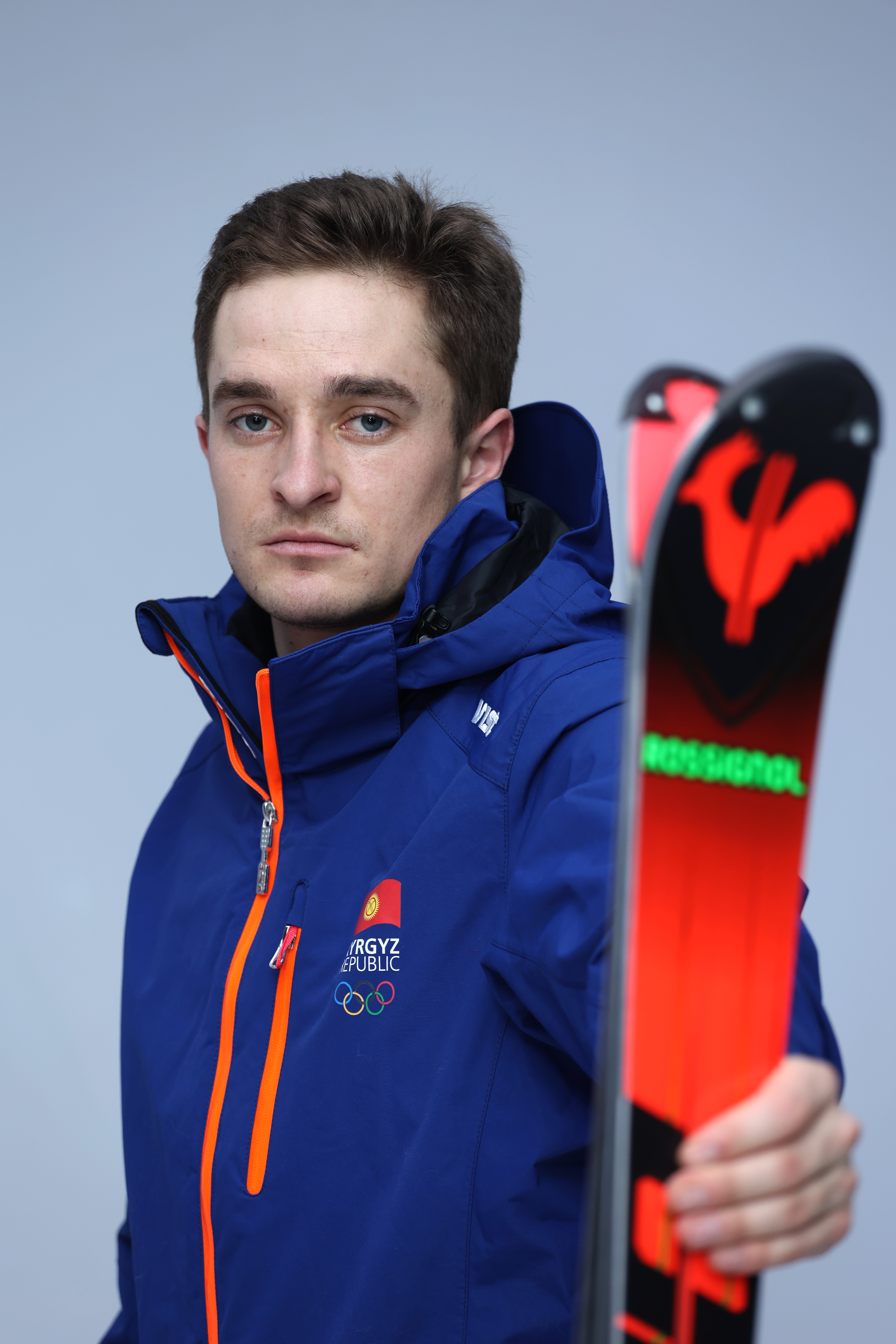

Personal information
- Full name: Maksim Gordeev
- Nationality: Kyrgyzstani
- Born: November 1, 1995 (age 29); Karakol, Kyrgyzstan

Sport
- Sport: Alpine skiing

Maxim Gordeev is a Kyrgyzstani Alpine Skier. He is competing in the Men's slalom at the 2022 Winter Olympics. He was the flag holder of Kyrgyzstan in the 2022 Winter Olympics opening ceremony
