= Stroke order =

Order of writing Chinese characters

Chinese name
- Traditional Chinese: 筆順
- Simplified Chinese: 笔顺
Transcriptions
Standard Mandarin
- Hanyu Pinyin: bǐshùn
Yue: Cantonese
- Yale Romanization: bāt seuhn
- Jyutping: bat^{1} seon^{6}

Vietnamese name
- Vietnamese alphabet: bút thuận
- Hán-Nôm: 筆順

Korean name
- Hangul: 필순; 획순
- Hanja: 筆順; 劃順
Transcriptions
- Revised Romanization: pilsun; hoeksun
- McCune–Reischauer: p'ilsun; hoeksun

Japanese name
- Kanji: 筆順; 書き順
Transcriptions
- Revised Hepburn: hitsujun; kaki-jun

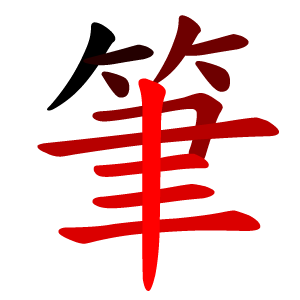
Stroke order for character 筆 shown by shade going from black to red

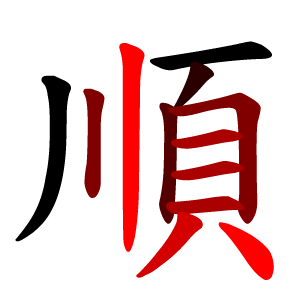
Stroke order for each component (川 and 頁) of the character 順 shown by shade going from black to red

Stroke order is the order in which the strokes of a Chinese character are written. A stroke is a movement of a writing instrument on a writing surface.

== Basic principles ==
Chinese characters are logograms constructed with strokes. Over the millennia a set of generally agreed rules have been developed by custom. Minor variations exist between countries, but the basic principles remain the same, namely that writing characters should be economical, with the fewest hand movements to write the most strokes possible. This promotes writing speed, accuracy, and readability. This idea is particularly important since as learners progress, characters often get more complex. Since stroke order also aids learning and memorization, students are often taught about it from a very early age in schools and encouraged to follow them.

The Eight Principles of Yong uses the single character 永 ('eternity') to teach eight of the most basic strokes in regular script.

== Stroke order per style ==
Historical evolution of the character 馬 'horse'
Oracle	Bronze	Seal		Clerical	Regular	
Oracle	Bronze	Large	Small	Clerical	Traditional	Simplified

=== Ancient China ===
In ancient China, the oracle bone script carved on ox scapula and tortoise plastrons showed no indication of stroke order. The characters show huge variations from piece to piece, sometimes even within one piece. During the divination ceremony, after the cracks were made, the characters were written with a brush on the shell or bone (to be carved in a workshop later). Although the brush-written stroke order is not discernible after carving, there exists some evidence that it was not entirely idiosyncratic: a few of the characters, often marginal administrative notations recording the provenance of the shells or bones, were not later re-carved, and the stroke order of these characters tends to resemble traditional and modern stroke order. For those characters (the vast majority) which were later engraved into the hard surface using a knife, perhaps by a separate individual, there is evidence (from incompletely engraved pieces) that in at least some cases all the strokes running one way were carved, then the piece was turned, and strokes running another way were then carved.

=== Imperial China ===
In early Imperial China, the common script was the small seal script. About 220 BC, the emperor Qin Shi Huang, the first to conquer all of China, imposed Li Si's character consolidation, a set of 3300 standardized small seal characters. Its graphs on old steles—some dating from 200 BC—reveal indications of the stroke order of the time. However, stroke order could still not yet be ascertained from the steles, and no paper from that time is extant.

The true starting point of stroke order is the clerical script which is more regularized, and in some ways similar to modern text. By looking at the clerical style steles' graphs and the placement of each stroke, one can see hierarchical priority between the strokes, which indicates the stroke order used by the calligrapher or stele sculptors.

Regular script is the most recent major script style, allowing one to more easily guess the stroke order used to write on the steles. The stroke order 1000 years ago was similar to that toward the end of Imperial China. For example, the stroke order of 广 is clear in the Kangxi Dictionary of 1716; but in a modern book, the official stroke order (the same) will not appear clearly. The Kangxi and current shapes have tiny differences, while current stroke order is still the same, according to the old style. However, the stroke orders implied by the Kangxi dictionary are not necessarily similar to nowadays' norm.

=== Cursive styles and hand-written styles ===
Cursive and semi-cursive script show stroke order more clearly than Regular Script, as each move made by the writing tool is visible.

== Stroke order per polity ==
The modern governments of mainland China, Hong Kong, Taiwan, and Japan have standardized official stroke orders to be taught in schools. These stroke order standards are prescribed in conjunction to each government's standard character sets. The various official stroke orders agree on the vast majority of characters, but each has its differences. No governmental standard matches traditional stroke orders completely. The differences between the governmental standards and traditional stroke orders arise from accommodation for schoolchildren who may be overwhelmed if the rules about stroke orders are too detailed, or if there are too many exceptions. The differences listed below are not exhaustive.

- Traditional stroke order: Widely used in Imperial China, currently used in the Chinese cultural sphere secondary to each region's governmental standards. Practiced mainly by informed scholars of calligraphy. Also called "calligraphic" stroke order. These stroke orders are established by study of handwritten documents from pre-Republic China, especially those of notable calligraphers. These stroke orders are most conservative regarding etymology, character construction, character evolution, and tradition. Many characters have more than one stroke correct form. Stroke orders may vary depending on the script style. Unlike the other standards, this is not a governmental standard.
- Japanese stroke order: Prescribed mostly in modern Japan. The standard character set of the MEXT is the Jōyō kanji, which contains many characters reformed in 1946. The MEXT lets editors freely prescribe a character's stroke order, which all should "follow commonsensical orders which are widely accepted in the society". This standard diverges from the traditional stroke order in that the two sides of the grass radical (艹) are joined, and written with three strokes. Also, this standard is influenced by semi-cursive script, leading to some vertical strokes to precede intersecting horizontal strokes if the vertical stroke does not pass through the lowest horizontal stroke, as in 隹 and 生. 必 is written with the top dot first, while the traditional stroke order writes the 丿 first.
- Taiwan stroke order (Li 1995): Prescribed mostly in modern Taiwan. The standard character set of the ROC Ministry of Education is the Standard Form of National Characters. This standard diverges from the traditional stroke order in that the upper-right dot of the 戈 component is written second to last. The vertical stroke in 忄 is written second. 成 starts with the horizontal. Also, the 𠂇 component, as seen in 左 and 右, is written with the horizontal stroke first in all instances, while the traditional stroke order differentiates the stroke order of 𠂇 according to etymology and character structure.
- Mainland China stroke order: Prescribed mostly in modern mainland China. In 1956, the government of the PRC introduced many newly created characters and substitutions, called simplified Chinese characters, which form part of the PRC Ministry of Education's standard character set, the Xiàndài Hànyǔ Chángyòng Zìbiǎo. This in turn reformed the stroke order of many characters. Besides these characters, this standard diverges from the traditional stroke order in characters with the 艹 radical, merging both sides like the Japanese standard. Also, the horizontal stroke of the 𠂇 component is written first in all instances. 乃 ends with 丿. 成 starts with the horizontal. In 1997, the PRC Ministry of Education published the official stroke order standard for commonly used characters.
- Hong Kong stroke order: Prescribed mostly in modern Hong Kong. The standard character set of the Hong Kong Education Bureau is the List of Forms of Frequently Used Characters. In this standard, 艹 is written vertical–horizontal–vertical–horizontal, instead of the traditional vertical–horizontal–horizontal–vertical. 成 starts with the horizontal.

Different stroke orders of the character 必.
Traditional	ROC & Hong Kong	Japan	PRC

== Alternative stroke orders ==
Besides general errors and regional differences in stroke order, it is common in the People's Republic of China to apply alternative stroke orders which resemble PRC stroke orders to Traditional Chinese characters, although the mainland generally uses simplified characters. In the below example, the traditional character 門 (simplified: 门) is shown with both the traditional stroke order (left, starting with the left vertical stroke), as in imperial China, Taiwan, Japan, and Hong Kong, and with the simplified stroke order (right, with the left vertical stroke fourth).

Traditional 門, traditional stroke order.

Traditional 門, PRC stroke order.

Simplified 门, traditional stroke order, comes from cursive script.

Simplified 门, PRC stroke order.

== General guidelines ==
Note: There are exceptions within and among different standards. The following are only guidelines.

1. Write from top to bottom, and left to right.

As a general rule, strokes are written from top to bottom and left to right. For example, among the first characters usually learned is the number one, which is written with a single horizontal line: 一. This character has one stroke which is written from left to right.

The character for "two" has two strokes: 二. In this case, both are written from left to right, but the top stroke is written first. The character for "three" has three strokes: 三. Each stroke is written from left to right, starting with the uppermost stroke.

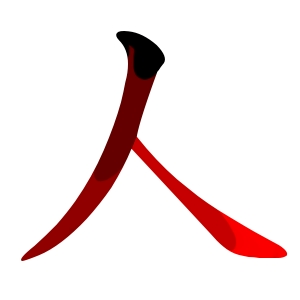
The Chinese character meaning "person" (Mandarin Chinese: rén, Cantonese Chinese: yàhn, Korean: in, Japanese: hito, nin; jin). The character has two strokes, the first shown here in dark, and the second in red. The black area represents the starting position of the writing instrument.

This rule also applies to the order of components. For example, 校 can be divided into two. The entire left side (木) is written before the right side (交). There are some exceptions to this rule, mainly occurring when the right side of a character has a lower enclosure (see below).

When there are upper and lower components, the upper components are written first, then the lower components, as in 品 and 星.

2. Horizontal before vertical

When horizontal and vertical strokes cross, horizontal strokes are usually written before vertical strokes: the character for "ten", 十, has two strokes. The horizontal stroke, 一, is written first, followed by the vertical stroke, to obtain 十.

Similarly, when a horizontal stroke is crossed by a right-to-left diagonal (丿), the horizontal stroke is written first, e.g., the first stroke of 大 is 一, followed by 丿.

In the Japanese standard, a vertical stroke may precede many intersecting horizontal strokes if the vertical stroke does not pass through the lowest horizontal stroke.

3. Character-spanning strokes last

Vertical strokes that pass through many other strokes are written after the strokes through which they pass, as in 聿 and 弗.

Horizontal strokes that pass through many other strokes are written last, as in 毋 and 舟.

4. Diagonals right-to-left before diagonals left-to-right

Right-to-left diagonals (丿) are written before left-to-right diagonals (乀), as in 文.

This is for symmetric diagonals; for asymmetric diagonals, as in 戈, the left-to-right may precede the right-to-left, based on other rules.

5. Center before outside in vertically symmetrical characters

In vertically symmetrical characters, the center components are written before components on the left or right. Components on the left are written before components on the right, as in 兜 and 承.

6. Enclosures before contents

Outside enclosing components are written before inside components; bottom strokes in the enclosure are written last if present, as in 日 and 口. (A common mnemonic is "Put people inside first, then close the door.") Enclosures may also have no bottom stroke, as in 同 and 月.

7. Left vertical before enclosing

Left vertical strokes are written before enclosing strokes. In the following two examples, the leftmost vertical stroke (|) is written first, followed by the uppermost and rightmost lines (┐) (which are written as one stroke): 日 and 口.

8. Bottom enclosures last

Bottom enclosing components are usually written last: 道, 建, 凶.

9. Dots and minor strokes last

Minor strokes are usually written last, as the small "dot" in the following: 玉, 求, 朮.

10. Vertical before diagonal lower-left-to-right

A vertical is written before a crossing diagonal lower-left-to-right stroke (㇀, ti), such as: 物, 软, 打.

== Representations ==
There are various ways to describe the stroke order of a character. Children learn the stroke order in courses, as part of writing learning. Various graphical representations are possible, most notably successive images of the character with one more stroke added (or changing color) each time, numbering strokes, color-coding, fanning, and more recently animations. Stroke order is often described in person by writing characters on paper or in the air.

== See also ==
- Chinese characters description languages
- Stroke Orders of the Commonly Used Standard Chinese Characters
- Stroke Order Standard of GB 13000.1 Character Set
- Stroke orders of CJK Unified Ideographs (YES order)
