= Aleksandr Tropnikov =

Kyrgyzstani biathlete

Personal information
- Nationality: Kyrgyzstani
- Born: 1 August 1965 (age 59); Cherepanovo, USSR

Sport
- Sport: Biathlon

Aleksandr Tropnikov (born 1 August 1965) is a Russian and Kyrgyzstani former biathlete. He competed at the 1998 Winter Olympics and the 2002 Winter Olympics.
