= Yevgeniya Roppel =

Kyrgyzstani biathlete

Personal information
- Nationality: Kyrgyzstani
- Born: 24 April 1976 (age 48)

Sport
- Sport: Biathlon

Yevgeniya Roppel (born 24 April 1976) is a Kyrgyzstani former biathlete. She competed in two events at the 1994 Winter Olympics. She was the first woman to represent Kyrgyzstan at the Olympics.
