= Dmitry Trelevski =

Kyrgyzstani alpine skier (born 1983)

Dmitry Trelevski (born November 14, 1983, in Bishkek) is an alpine skier from Kyrgyzstan. He competed for Kyrgyzstan at the 2010 Winter Olympics in the slalom and giant slalom. Trelevski was Kyrgyzstan's flag bearer during the 2010 Winter Olympics opening ceremony and in 2014.
