= National Olympic Committee of the Kyrgyz Republic =

National Olympic Committee

- Country: Kyrgyzstan
- Code: KGZ
- Created: 1991
- Recognized: 1993
- Continental Association: OCA
- Headquarters: Bishkek, Kyrgyzstan
- President: Aivaz Omorkanov
- Secretary General: Kylychbek Sarbaghyshev
- Website: www.olympic.kg

The National Olympic Committee of the Kyrgyz Republic (Kyrgyz: Кыргызстан улуттук олимпиада комитети), (also referred to as the Kyrgyzstan) is an organization representing Kyrgyzstan in the international Olympic movement. It was recognized by the International Olympic Committee in 1992.

It is headquartered in Bishkek. The National Olympic Committee of the Kyrgyz Republic is a member of the International Olympic Committee, the Olympic Council of Asia and other international sports organizations.

== History ==
The history of the Olympic movement of the Kyrgyz Republic began in 1960, when an athlete from the Kyrgyz Soviet Socialist Republic, Saybattal Mursalimov, as a member of the national team of the Soviet Union, first participated in the games of the Olympics in Rome. From 1960 to 1990, the Olympic movement in the Kyrgyz Soviet Socialist Republic grew and strengthened its position in the country's life. During the XXII Olympics in 1980, Kyrgyz athletes won 6 medals, including 5 gold.

In 1991, the founding General Assembly decided to establish the National Olympic Committee of the Kyrgyz Republic, and this date is the official date of its establishment. In September 1993, the NOC of Kyrgyzstan was finally recognized by the International Olympic Committee. The Kyrgyz NOC acts in accordance with the provisions of the Olympic Charter, the Constitution of the Kyrgyz Republic, and the current Kyrgyz legislation and its Charter.

Kyrgyzstan debuted as an independent state at the 1994 Winter Olympics in Lillehammer, Norway, and has since competed in all the Games. At the 1992 Summer Olympics, Kyrgyz athletes were part of a unified team, and previously, since 1952, they performed under the flag of the USSR. The national team was represented by one athlete, biathlete Evgenia Roppel. She took 66th place in the sprint and 67th place in the individual race. At the time of the first race, she was 17 years and 300 days old. Since the Kyrgyz team did not arrive for the opening ceremony, the flag of the country was carried by interpreter Torkel Engenes.

Kyrgyzstan first competed in the Summer Olympics as an independent nation at the 1996 Summer Olympics in Atlanta, USA. Previously, Kyrgyz athletes competed for the combined team at the 1992 Summer Olympics.

Ruslan Ismailov is the youngest athlete in the history of the NOC of the Kyrgyz Republic. At the time of his participation in the 2004 Summer Olympics in Athens, he was 14 years old. He qualified in the men's 200m freestyle, swimming.

Kyrgyzstan's oldest competitor was Irina Bogacheva. She was 43 when she took part in the 2004 Athens Olympics. She participated in the long-distance marathon.

In total, Kyrgyz athletes won 7 Olympic medals (3 silver and 4 bronze) during their performance as an independent team. All medals were obtained at the Summer Olympics.

== Activities of the NOC of the Kyrgyz Republic ==
The subject of the NOC of the Kyrgyz Republic's activities is the worldwide development, support, and protection of the Olympic movement in the Kyrgyz Republic, aimed at achieving the following goals:

- Assistance to the physical and spiritual education of the population by means of physical culture and sport
- Strengthening the positions and enhancing the prestige of sports in the republic and in the international arena.

The main objectives of the NOC of the Kyrgyz Republic are:

- Assistance in the development of mass sports and sports of the highest achievements realization of the Olympic movement's cultural and educational potential; development of moral, aesthetic, and other humanistic values; combating negative sports phenomena
- Worldwide development and strengthening of the Olympic movement in the Kyrgyz Republic
- Propaganda of the ideas of Olympism in the Kyrgyz Republic and its regions
- Introduction of Olympic education
- Assistance in the organization of physical training and sports for people with disabilities; participation in acts of mercy and organization of assistance to people with disabilities.

== Presidents of the NOC of the Kyrgyz Republic ==
№	President	Start of term	End of term
1	Eshim Kutmanaliev	1993	2004
2	Bayaman Erkimbaev	2005	2006
3	Murat Saralinov	2006	2015
4	Sharshenbek Abdykerimov	2015	2021
5	Sadyr Mamytov	2021	2024
6	Umbetaly Kydyraliev	2024	2026
7	Aivaz Omorkanov	2026	present

== See also ==
- Kyrgyzstan at the Olympics
- Kyrgyzstan at the 2020 Summer Olympics
- Kyrgyzstan at the 2000 Summer Olympics
- Kyrgyzstan at the 2004 Summer Olympics
- Kyrgyzstan at the 2008 Summer Olympics
