= 2011 World Taekwondo Olympic Qualification Tournament – Men's 68 kg =

Taekwondo competition

World Qualification Tournament
Men	Women
58 kg	49 kg
68 kg	57 kg
80 kg	67 kg
+80 kg	+67 kg

The Men's 68 kg is a competition featured at the 2011 World Taekwondo Olympic Qualification Tournament, and was held at the Sarhadchi Olympic Center in Baku, Azerbaijan on July 1. The first three ranked athletes qualify their NOCs a place each at the 2012 Olympic Games.

== Results ==
Legend

- DQ — Won by disqualification
- KO — Won by knockout
- PUN — Won by punitive declaration
- RSC — Won by referee stop contest
- WD — Won by withdrawal

=== Finals ===
Semifinals
Mohammad Bagheri Motamed (IRI)	4
Erick Osornio (MEX)	1
Diogo Silva (BRA)	1
Servet Tazegül (TUR)	13

Final
Mohammad Bagheri Motamed (IRI)	4
Servet Tazegül (TUR)	6
3rd place
Erick Osornio (MEX)	3
Diogo Silva (BRA)	5

=== Top half ===
==== Section 1 ====
Round of 64
Deniss Sisojevs (LAT)	0
Manuel Mark (AUT)	8
Milad Ashna (SWE)	13
Ghazi Al-Asmari (KSA)	12
Viktor Jankovský (CZE)	0
Elvin Mammadov (AZE)	1
Nidhal Sboui (TUN)	3
Juho Kostiainen (FIN)	5
Ismael Abdoulaye Boukari (NIG)	1
Mario Guerra (CHI)	10
~~Tilek Tursunaliev (KGZ)~~
Jure Pantar (SLO)	DQ
Tarig Mohammed (SUD)	3
Rohullah Nikpai (AFG)	17

Round of 32
Mohammad Bagheri Motamed (IRI)	9
Manuel Mark (AUT)	3
Milad Ashna (SWE)	3
Elvin Mammadov (AZE)	7
Juho Kostiainen (FIN)	1
Mario Guerra (CHI)	4
Jure Pantar (SLO)	0
Rohullah Nikpai (AFG)	7

Round of 16
Mohammad Bagheri Motamed (IRI)	4
Elvin Mammadov (AZE)	1
Mario Guerra (CHI)	2
Rohullah Nikpai (AFG)	11

Quarterfinals
Mohammad Bagheri Motamed (IRI)	6
Rohullah Nikpai (AFG)	5

==== Section 2 ====
Round of 64
Mohammad Abulibdeh (JOR)	DQ
~~Mohamed Mahmoudi (ALG)~~
Vladislav Arventii (MDA)	6
Jean Moloise Ogoudjobi (BEN)	1
Logan Campbell (NZL)	12
Charles Cromwell (GHA)	9
~~Víctor Zepeda (HON)~~
Erick Osornio (MEX)	DQ
Jhohanny Jean (DOM)	PUN
Yaser Bamatraf (YEM)
Attila Juhász (HUN)	DQ
~~Naranchimegiin Erdenebaatar (MGL)~~
Kazuki Sawada (JPN)	DQ
~~Dorian Alexander (TRI)~~
Anatol Kachuk (BLR)	5
Balla Dièye (SEN)	8

Round of 32
Mohammad Abulibdeh (JOR)	7
Vladislav Arventii (MDA)	4
Logan Campbell (NZL)	6
Erick Osornio (MEX)	9
Jhohanny Jean (DOM)	RSC
Attila Juhász (HUN)
Kazuki Sawada (JPN)	2
Balla Dièye (SEN)	10

Round of 16
Mohammad Abulibdeh (JOR)	9
Erick Osornio (MEX)	10
Jhohanny Jean (DOM)	5
Balla Dièye (SEN)	1

Quarterfinals
Erick Osornio (MEX)	5
Jhohanny Jean (DOM)	3

=== Bottom half ===
==== Section 3 ====
Round of 64
Peter López (PER)	DQ
~~Afifuddin Omar Sidek (MAS)~~
Adam Sagir (ISR)	4
Aleksiy Avsadzhanishvili (GEO)	6
Jan Petter Hammer (NOR)
Eugen Micu (ROU)	PUN
Sergio García (ECU)	4
Federico Rosal (GUA)	6
Filip Grgić (CRO)	DQ
~~Yahya Mahamud (KEN)~~
~~Yoven Soobramaney (MRI)~~
Mário Silva (POR)	DQ
Vladimir Dalakliev (BUL)	1
Patiwat Thongsalap (THA)	0
~~Cédric Botalatala (COD)~~
Diogo Silva (BRA)	DQ

Round of 32
Peter López (PER)	6
Aleksiy Avsadzhanishvili (GEO)	5
Eugen Micu (ROU)	3
Federico Rosal (GUA)	8
Filip Grgić (CRO)	2
Mário Silva (POR)	1
Vladimir Dalakliev (BUL)	3
Diogo Silva (BRA)	8

Round of 16
Peter López (PER)	3
Federico Rosal (GUA)	7
Filip Grgić (CRO)	7
Diogo Silva (BRA)	14

Quarterfinals
Federico Rosal (GUA)	1
Diogo Silva (BRA)	3

==== Section 4 ====
Round of 64
Jean-Noël Obou (CIV)	5
Chuang Tzu-te (TPE)	8
Michał Łoniewski (POL)	7
Michel Samaha (LIB)	6
Farkhod Negmatov (TJK)	4
Ivan Purešević (SRB)	2
Dương Thanh Tâm (VIE)	2
Dennis Bekkers (NED)	3
Terrence Jennings (USA)	15
Nicolau Sambo (MOZ)	2
Xhersi Kurti (ALB)	0
Mohammed Younis (PLE)	1
Macho Virgonta Hungan (INA)	WD
Duncan Mahlangu (RSA)
Sean Joyce (IRL)	5
Servet Tazegül (TUR)	17

Round of 32
Chuang Tzu-te (TPE)	2
Michał Łoniewski (POL)	4
Farkhod Negmatov (TJK)	RSC
Dennis Bekkers (NED)
Terrence Jennings (USA)	RSC
Mohammed Younis (PLE)
Macho Virgonta Hungan (INA)	3
Servet Tazegül (TUR)	9

Round of 16
Michał Łoniewski (POL)	7
Farkhod Negmatov (TJK)	4
Terrence Jennings (USA)
Servet Tazegül (TUR)	KO

Quarterfinals
Michał Łoniewski (POL)	3
Servet Tazegül (TUR)	9
