= 2011 World Taekwondo Championships – Men's featherweight =

Taekwondo competition

Men's featherweight at the 2011 World Championships
- Venue: Gyeongju Indoor Stadium
- Dates: 3–4 May 2011
- Competitors: 97 from 97 nations

Medalists
| gold medal | Servet Tazegül | Turkey |
| silver medal | Mohammad Bagheri Motamed | Iran |
| bronze medal | Rohullah Nikpai | Afghanistan |
| bronze medal | Martin Stamper | Great Britain |

The Men's featherweight is a competition featured at the 2011 World Taekwondo Championships, which was held at the Gyeongju Gymnasium in Gyeongju, South Korea on May 3 and May 4, 2011. Featherweights were limited to a maximum of 68 kilograms in body mass.

== Results ==
Legend

- DQ — Won by disqualification
- P — Won by punitive declaration
- R — Won by referee stop contest
- W — Won by withdrawal

=== Finals ===
| Quarterfinals | | Semifinals | | Final |
| Mohammad Bagheri Motamed (IRI) | 11 |
| Vasily Nikitin (RUS) | 4 | Mohammad Bagheri Motamed (IRI) | 12 |
| Mohammad Abulibdeh (JOR) | 4 | Rohullah Nikpai (AFG) | 5 |
| Rohullah Nikpai (AFG) | 7 | | | Mohammad Bagheri Motamed (IRI) | 8 |
| Martin Stamper (GBR) | 11 | | | Servet Tazegül (TUR) | 9 |
| Christopher Dubois (FRA) | 1 | Martin Stamper (GBR) | 2 |
| Jhohanny Jean (DOM) | 1 | Servet Tazegül (TUR) | 15 |
| Servet Tazegül (TUR) | 15 |

=== Top half ===
==== Section 1 ====
Round of 128
Désiré Jaotiana (MAD) | 3
Mario Guerra (CHI) | 10
~~Mizza Quddus Piu (TGA)~~
Win Tun Linn (MYA) | DQ
Chandan Lakra (IND) | 9
Marc Mbombo (COD) | 5
Yoven Soobramaney (MRI) | 1
Claudio Treviso (ITA) | 8
Gregory Markiet (SUR) | 3
Kazuki Sawada (JPN) | 15

Round of 64
Mohammad Bagheri Motamed (IRI) | 6
Mario Guerra (CHI) | 1
Win Tun Linn (MYA) | 5
Chandan Lakra (IND) | 1
Terrence Jennings (USA) | 3
Claudio Treviso (ITA) | 6
Kazuki Sawada (JPN) | 8
Filip Grgić (CRO) | 11

Round of 32
Mohammad Bagheri Motamed (IRI) | 5
Win Tun Linn (MYA) | 2
Claudio Treviso (ITA) | 2
Filip Grgić (CRO) | 3

Round of 16
Mohammad Bagheri Motamed (IRI) | 6
Filip Grgić (CRO) | 3

==== Section 2 ====
Round of 128
Mohamed Mahmoudi (ALG) | 15
Charles Cromwell (GHA) | 6
Nikita Rafalovich (UZB) | DQ
~~Aleksiy Avsadzhanishvili (GEO)~~
~~Marcelin Nguile (CMR)~~
Neji Gam (TUN) | DQ
Langton Chokwenda (ZIM) | 0
Boris Lieskovský (SVK) | 5

Round of 64
Vasily Nikitin (RUS) | 7
Mohamed Mahmoudi (ALG) | 4
Nikita Rafalovich (UZB) | 4
Supakit Chanteerawong (THA) | 2
Michel Samaha (LIB) | 4
Neji Gam (TUN) | 0
Boris Lieskovský (SVK) | 2
Diogo Silva (BRA) | 8

Round of 32
Vasily Nikitin (RUS) | 8
Nikita Rafalovich (UZB) | 7
Michel Samaha (LIB) | 0
Diogo Silva (BRA) | 4

Round of 16
Vasily Nikitin (RUS) | 6
Diogo Silva (BRA) | 5

==== Section 3 ====
Round of 128
Deniss Sisojevs (LAT) | 4
Xhersi Kurti (ALB) | 2
Ilkin Shahbazov (AZE) | 3
Khalid Boulabhaiem (MAR) | 2
Yeung Tsz Wing (HKG) | 5
Tilek Tursunaliev (KGZ) | 2
Federico Rosal (GUA) | 3
Zhu Fei (CHN) | 10

Round of 64
Mohammad Abulibdeh (JOR) | 6^{W}
Deniss Sisojevs (LAT) | 0
Ilkin Shahbazov (AZE) | DQ
~~Nikola Bošnjak (BIH)~~
~~Danny Miranda (VEN)~~
Yeung Tsz Wing (HKG) | DQ
Zhu Fei (CHN) | 5
Abdallah Ossama (EGY) | 4

Round of 32
Mohammad Abulibdeh (JOR) | 12
Ilkin Shahbazov (AZE) | 11
Yeung Tsz Wing (HKG) | 6
Zhu Fei (CHN) | 9

Round of 16
Mohammad Abulibdeh (JOR) | 9
Zhu Fei (CHN) | 4

==== Section 4 ====
Round of 128
Kairat Sarymsakov (KAZ) | 5
Brodie Sciberras (AUS) | 4
~~Duvan Torres (COL)~~
Dorian Alexander (TRI) | DQ
Jan Petter Hammer (NOR) | DQ
~~Raphael Decius (HAI)~~
~~Eloy Boa Morte (STP)~~
Khalled Toukourou (BEN) | DQ

Round of 64
Erick Osornio (MEX) | 2
Kairat Sarymsakov (KAZ) | 1
Dorian Alexander (TRI) | 3
Rohullah Nikpai (AFG) | 17
Afifuddin Omar Sidek (MAS) | 4
Jan Petter Hammer (NOR) | 11
Khalled Toukourou (BEN) | 0
Siddhartha Bhat (CAN) | 8

Round of 32
Erick Osornio (MEX) | 4
Rohullah Nikpai (AFG) | 8
Jan Petter Hammer (NOR) | 0
Siddhartha Bhat (CAN) | 4

Round of 16
Rohullah Nikpai (AFG) | 7
Siddhartha Bhat (CAN) | 6

=== Bottom half ===
==== Section 5 ====
Round of 128
Ahmed Kaabi (IRQ) | 2
Luis Colon (PUR) | 4
Ashish Maharjan (NEP) | 5
Sükhboldyn Erdenebat (MGL) | 6
Usman Abid Mughal (PAK) | 13
Leo Trevor (VAN) | 1
Tsvetolyub Iliev (BUL) | 8
Artūras Teikertas (LTU) | 1

Round of 64
Balla Dièye (SEN) | 8
Luis Colon (PUR) | 9
Sükhboldyn Erdenebat (MGL) | 6
Norhalim Zahruddin (SIN) | 3
~~Isah Mohammad (NGR)~~
Usman Abid Mughal (PAK) | DQ
Tsvetolyub Iliev (BUL) | 3
Martin Stamper (GBR) | 5

Round of 32
Luis Colon (PUR) | 11^{P}
Sükhboldyn Erdenebat (MGL) | 3
Usman Abid Mughal (PAK) | 0
Martin Stamper (GBR) | 8^{R}

Round of 16
Luis Colon (PUR) | 8
Martin Stamper (GBR) | 9

==== Section 6 ====
Round of 128
Duncan Mahlangu (RSA) | DQ
~~Osvaldo Cáceres (PAR)~~
Ivan Purešević (SRB) | DQ
~~Sergio García (ECU)~~
Alon Elbocher (ISR) | 6
Antonis Xanthou (CYP) | 2
Michał Łoniewski (POL) | DQ
~~Leroy Lewis (SKN)~~

Round of 64
Logan Campbell (NZL) | 0^{W}
Duncan Mahlangu (RSA) | 0
Ivan Purešević (SRB) | 4
Juho Kostiainen (FIN) | 3
Christopher Dubois (FRA) | 2
Alon Elbocher (ISR) | 1
Michał Łoniewski (POL) | 5
Daniel Manz (GER) | 8

Round of 32
Logan Campbell (NZL) | 6
Ivan Purešević (SRB) | 7
Christopher Dubois (FRA) | 13
Daniel Manz (GER) | 1

Round of 16
Ivan Purešević (SRB) | 4
Christopher Dubois (FRA) | 8

==== Section 7 ====
Round of 128
José Fernandes (POR) | 10
Samuel Morrison (PHI) | 12
Viktor Jankovský (CZE) | DQ
~~Osman Abdelwahab (SUD)~~
Said Gafar Salih (QAT) | 11
Anatol Kachuk (BLR) | 10
~~Francis Kiambi (KEN)~~
Meque Nkualembo (MOZ) | DQ

Round of 64
Jang Se-wook (KOR) | 6
Samuel Morrison (PHI) | 8
Viktor Jankovský (CZE) | 4
Nguyễn Trần Quốc Đạt (VIE) | 3
Jhohanny Jean (DOM) | 6
Said Gafar Salih (QAT) | 1
Meque Nkualembo (MOZ) | 4
Dennis Bekkers (NED) | 10

Round of 32
Samuel Morrison (PHI) | 8
Viktor Jankovský (CZE) | 4
Jhohanny Jean (DOM) | 8
Dennis Bekkers (NED) | 2

Round of 16
Samuel Morrison (PHI) | 3
Jhohanny Jean (DOM) | 4

==== Section 8 ====
Round of 128
Farkhod Negmatov (TJK) | 13^{W}
Ahmad Harata (SYR) | 4
~~Mohammed Younis (PLE)~~
Attila Juhász (HUN) | DQ
Georgios Michailidis (GRE) | 8
Macho Virgonta Hungan (INA) | 3
Stéphane Moundounga (GAB) | DQ
~~Ismael Abdoulaye Boukari (NIG)~~

Round of 64
Lo Tsung-jui (TPE) | 3
Farkhod Negmatov (TJK) | 4
Attila Juhász (HUN) | 6
Axel Raymond (NCD) | 4
José Antonio Carregal (ESP) | 5
Georgios Michailidis (GRE) | 10
Stéphane Moundounga (GAB) | 2
Servet Tazegül (TUR) | 4

Round of 32
Farkhod Negmatov (TJK) | 8
Attila Juhász (HUN) | 2
Georgios Michailidis (GRE) | 8
Servet Tazegül (TUR) | 25

Round of 16
Farkhod Negmatov (TJK) | 3
Servet Tazegül (TUR) | 13
