= 2013 World Taekwondo Championships – Men's featherweight =

Taekwondo competition

Men's featherweight at the 2013 World Championships
- Venue: Exhibition Center of Puebla
- Dates: 17 July 2013
- Competitors: 82 from 81 nations

Medalists
gold medal	Behnam Asbaghi	Iran
silver medal	Kim Hun	South Korea
bronze medal	Balla Dièye	Senegal
bronze medal	José Antonio Rosillo	Spain

The Men's featherweight is a competition featured at the 2013 World Taekwondo Championships, and was held at the Exhibition Center of Puebla in Puebla, Mexico on July 17. Featherweights were limited to a maximum of 68 kilograms in body mass.

== Results ==
- DQ — Won by disqualification
- P — Won by punitive declaration
- R — Won by referee stop contest
- W — Won by withdrawal

=== Finals ===
Quarterfinals		Semifinals		Final
Kim Hun (KOR)	8
Vasily Nikitin (RUS)	3	Kim Hun (KOR)	10
Luis Colon (PUR)	6	Balla Dièye (SEN)	5
Balla Dièye (SEN)	8			Kim Hun (KOR)	4
Ghofran Zaki (EGY)	7			Behnam Asbaghi (IRI)	5
José Antonio Rosillo (ESP)	15	José Antonio Rosillo (ESP)	3
Vladislav Arventii (MDA)	1	Behnam Asbaghi (IRI)	8
Behnam Asbaghi (IRI)	2

=== Top half ===
==== Section 1 ====
Round of 128
Vladislav Khan (UZB)	11
Almas Mukamanov (KAZ)	1
Gopolang Mokoka (RSA)	DQ
~~Thinagaran Naidu Papunaidu (MAS)~~
~~António Fernandes (ANG)~~
Valery Nyamsik (CMR)	DQ

Round of 64
Servet Tazegül (TUR)	8
Vladislav Khan (UZB)	6
Leonardo Cheiban (LIB)	DQ
~~Sofiane Merzouk (ALG)~~
Kim Hun (KOR)	11
Gopolang Mokoka (RSA)	3
Valery Nyamsik (CMR)	0
Claudio Treviso (ITA)	7

Round of 32
Servet Tazegül (TUR)	5
Leonardo Cheiban (LIB)	7
Kim Hun (KOR)	5
Claudio Treviso (ITA)	3

Round of 16
Leonardo Cheiban (LIB)	1
Kim Hun (KOR)	13

==== Section 2 ====
Round of 128
~~Bruce Jonathan (VAN)~~
Dorian Alexander (TTO)	DQ
~~Norman Florentin (PAR)~~	DQ
~~José Rivera (ESA)~~	DQ

Round of 64
Vasily Nikitin (RUS)	15
Dorian Alexander (TTO)	4
Vladimir Dalakliev (BUL)	3
Mönkhboldyn Myagmarbayar (MGL)	4
Yerson Mendoza (COL)	4
Jorge Álvarez (ARG)	16
Bye
Filip Grgić (CRO)

Round of 32
Vasily Nikitin (RUS)	6
Mönkhboldyn Myagmarbayar (MGL)	1
Jorge Álvarez (ARG)	5
Filip Grgić (CRO)	4

Round of 16
Vasily Nikitin (RUS)	3
Jorge Álvarez (ARG)	3

==== Section 3 ====
Round of 128
Khusrav Giyosov (TJK)	5
Tom Afonczenko (AUS)	10^{P}
~~Abdelkadre Alio (CHA)~~
Boris Lieskovský (SVK)	DQ

Round of 64
Terrence Jennings (USA)	10
Tom Afonczenko (AUS)	3
Marios Fyllakoudias (CYP)	7
Patrice Catelo (GDL)	2
Raihau Chin (FRA)	DQ
~~Saikou Touray (GAM)~~
Boris Lieskovský (SVK)	6
Luis Colon (PUR)	12

Round of 32
Terrence Jennings (USA)	8
Marios Fyllakoudias (CYP)	3
Raihau Chin (FRA)	11
Luis Colon (PUR)	12

Round of 16
Terrence Jennings (USA)	8
Luis Colon (PUR)	18

==== Section 4 ====
Round of 128
Gan Guo Bin (SIN)	DQ
~~Ghazi Al-Asmari (KSA)~~
Edgar Contreras (VEN)	9
Víctor Zepeda (HON)	10

Round of 64
Mario Guerra (CHI)	5
Gan Guo Bin (SIN)	1
Majd Assfour (JOR)	9
Said Gafar Salih (QAT)	15
Abedi Sagesse (COD)	2
Georges Kobenan (CIV)	1
Víctor Zepeda (HON)	0
Balla Dièye (SEN)	12

Round of 32
Mario Guerra (CHI)	3
Said Gafar Salih (QAT)	7
Abedi Sagesse (COD)	0
Balla Dièye (SEN)	3^{W}

Round of 16
Said Gafar Salih (QAT)	4
Balla Dièye (SEN)	6

=== Bottom half ===
==== Section 5 ====
Round of 128
André Magone (POR)	6
Ghofran Zaki (EGY)	12
~~Tilek Tursunaliev (KGZ)~~
Thomas Oh (NZL)	DQ

Round of 64
Martin Stamper (GBR)	3
Ghofran Zaki (EGY)	5
Charles Cromwell (GHA)	4
Gilson Rodrigues (CPV)	1
Lo Tsung-jui (TPE)	5
Mbongeni Sibandze (SWZ)	0
Thomas Oh (NZL)	1
Michał Łoniewski (POL)	13

Round of 32
Ghofran Zaki (EGY)	3^{R}
Charles Cromwell (GHA)	0
Lo Tsung-jui (TPE)	3
Michał Łoniewski (POL)	2

Round of 16
Ghofran Zaki (EGY)	4
Lo Tsung-jui (TPE)	3

==== Section 6 ====
Round of 128
Stylianos Mechteridis (GRE)	DQ
~~Stéphane Moundounga (GAB)~~
Chetrapee Tangjai (THA)	12
Aldo Mata (CRC)	9

Round of 64
David Boui (CAF)	2
Stylianos Mechteridis (GRE)	4
José Antonio Rosillo (ESP)	13
Nicholas Pigozzi (BRA)	8
Pun Chi Fai (MAC)	2
Ilan Braginski (ISR)	14
Chetrapee Tangjai (THA)	7
Peter López (PER)	6

Round of 32
Stylianos Mechteridis (GRE)	5
José Antonio Rosillo (ESP)	19
Ilan Braginski (ISR)	6
Chetrapee Tangjai (THA)	7

Round of 16
José Antonio Rosillo (ESP)	7
Chetrapee Tangjai (THA)	6

==== Section 7 ====
Round of 128
Vladislav Arventii (MDA)	5
Gershon Bautista (PHI)	0
Jean-François Laberge (CAN)	3
Ivan Purešević (SRB)	11

Round of 64
Daniel Manz (GER)	4
Vladislav Arventii (MDA)	6
~~Segun Olushola (NGR)~~
Savio Nzeyimana (RWA)	DQ
Abdullah Hasan (KUW)	9
Paraita Brothers (FPO)	8
Ivan Purešević (SRB)	7
Neji Gam (TUN)	5

Round of 32
Vladislav Arventii (MDA)	13
Savio Nzeyimana (RWA)	1
Abdullah Hasan (KUW)	3
Ivan Purešević (SRB)	6

Round of 16
Vladislav Arventii (MDA)	3
Ivan Purešević (SRB)	2

==== Section 8 ====
Round of 128
Viktor Jankovský (CZE)	0
Elvin Mammadov (AZE)	8
Behnam Asbaghi (IRI)	5
Stuardo Solorzano (GUA)	1
Xiao Weiqi (CHN)	4
Wilkin Heredia (DOM)	1

Round of 64
~~Ivan Kassman (PNG)~~
Elvin Mammadov (AZE)	DQ
Behnam Asbaghi (IRI)	15
Ángel Mora (CUB)	5
Phan Trung Đức (VIE)	7
Surendra Bhandari (WTF)	8
Xiao Weiqi (CHN)	2
Idulio Islas (MEX)	13

Round of 32
Elvin Mammadov (AZE)	0
Behnam Asbaghi (IRI)	4
Surendra Bhandari (WTF)	3
Idulio Islas (MEX)	8

Round of 16
Behnam Asbaghi (IRI)	3
Idulio Islas (MEX)	2
