= 2009 World Taekwondo Championships – Men's featherweight =

Taekwondo competitionTaekwondo competition

Men's featherweight at the 2009 World Championships
- Venue: Ballerup Super Arena
- Dates: 16 October 2009
- Competitors: 81 from 81 nations

Medalists
gold medal	Mohammad Bagheri Motamed	Iran
silver medal	Idulio Islas	Mexico
bronze medal	Servet Tazegül	Turkey
bronze medal	Balla Dièye	Senegal

The Men's featherweight competition at the 2009 World Taekwondo Championships was held at the Ballerup Super Arena in Copenhagen, Denmark on October 16.

Featherweights were limited to a maximum of 68 kilograms in body mass.

== Results ==
Legend

- DQ — Won by disqualification

=== Finals ===
Quarterfinals		Semifinals		Final
Servet Tazegül (TUR)	7
Lee In-kyu (KOR)	3	Servet Tazegül (TUR)	3
Mohammad Bagheri Motamed (IRI)	6	Mohammad Bagheri Motamed (IRI)	4
Steven Lin (USA)	3			Mohammad Bagheri Motamed (IRI)	3
Idulio Islas (MEX)	4			Idulio Islas (MEX)	2
Tony Grisman (GBR)	3	Idulio Islas (MEX)	4
Peter López (PER)	2	Balla Dièye (SEN)	2
Balla Dièye (SEN)	6

=== Top half ===
==== Section 1 ====
Round of 128
Sebastián Borjas (URU)	5
Raphael Decius (HAI)	6
Naranchimegiin Erdenebaatar (MGL)	12
José Fernandes (POR)	13
Michał Łoniewski (POL)	5
Alan Brian (NZL)	1

Round of 64
Servet Tazegül (TUR)	14
Raphael Decius (HAI)	3
Gregory Markiet (SUR)	DQ
~~Steve Tasso (VAN)~~
Patrick Simy (CIV)	9
José Fernandes (POR)	12
Michał Łoniewski (POL)	3
Mohammad Abulibdeh (JOR)	11

Round of 32
Servet Tazegül (TUR)	6
Gregory Markiet (SUR)	0
José Fernandes (POR)	4
Mohammad Abulibdeh (JOR)	7

Round of 16
Servet Tazegül (TUR)	9
Mohammad Abulibdeh (JOR)	2

==== Section 2 ====
Round of 128
~~Sandeep Kumar (IND)~~
Christos Karaolis (CYP)	DQ
Lee In-kyu (KOR)	4
Miloš Bundalo (SRB)	3

Round of 64
Dennis Bekkers (NED)	8
Christos Karaolis (CYP)	1
Duncan Mahlangu (RSA)	3
Steven Barclais (FRA)	10
Maksim Rafalovich (UZB)	8
Kusung Wangdi (BHU)	0
Lee In-kyu (KOR)	9
Ilkin Shahbazov (AZE)	0

Round of 32
Dennis Bekkers (NED)	1
Steven Barclais (FRA)	0
Maksim Rafalovich (UZB)	2
Lee In-kyu (KOR)	4

Round of 16
Dennis Bekkers (NED)	2
Lee In-kyu (KOR)	5

==== Section 3 ====
Round of 128
Simonas Norvydas (LTU)	0
Danny Miranda (VEN)	3
Ondrej Cehlár (SVK)	12
Ángel Mora (CUB)	13

Round of 64
Mohammad Bagheri Motamed (IRI)	8
Danny Miranda (VEN)	1
Tang Hua (CHN)	9
Rolland Sylla (MLI)	3
Kairat Sarymsakov (KAZ)	3
Yafi Palma (COL)	1
Ángel Mora (CUB)	9
Stéphane Moundounga (GAB)	1

Round of 32
Mohammad Bagheri Motamed (IRI)	3
Tang Hua (CHN)	1
Kairat Sarymsakov (KAZ)	3
Ángel Mora (CUB)	4

Round of 16
Mohammad Bagheri Motamed (IRI)	4
Ángel Mora (CUB)	3

==== Section 4 ====
Round of 128
Adriano Manciocchi (ITA)	0
Tom Hovav (ISR)	6
Gilson Rodrigues (CPV)	4
Viktor Jankovský (CZE)	10

Round of 64
Steven Lin (USA)	2
Tom Hovav (ISR)	2
Dimitar Michailov (BUL)	2
Jhohanny Jean (DOM)	2
Kyle Washington (PUR)	13
Samuel Lee (SIN)	3
Viktor Jankovský (CZE)	4
Diogo Silva (BRA)	5

Round of 32
Steven Lin (USA)	6
Jhohanny Jean (DOM)	5
Kyle Washington (PUR)	1
Diogo Silva (BRA)	5

Round of 16
Steven Lin (USA)	4
Diogo Silva (BRA)	3

=== Bottom half ===
==== Section 5 ====
Round of 128
Yoven Soobramaney (MRI)	5
Jo Ness (NOR)	9
Stelios Samaras (GRE)	2
Mario Guerra (CHI)	1

Round of 64
Daniel Manz (GER)	4
Jo Ness (NOR)	1
Sebastian Lai (SWE)	2
Jeffrey Figueroa (PHI)	3
Abdeladim Ammouri (MAR)	4
Jerome Cabanatan (CAN)	3
Stelios Samaras (GRE)	1
Idulio Islas (MEX)	2

Round of 32
Daniel Manz (GER)	5
Jeffrey Figueroa (PHI)	10
Abdeladim Ammouri (MAR)	3
Idulio Islas (MEX)	6

Round of 16
Jeffrey Figueroa (PHI)	2
Idulio Islas (MEX)	6

==== Section 6 ====
Round of 128
Ahmed Abukahla (PLE)	8
Mauricio Borjas (HON)	4
James Horan (IRL)	3
Diego Chango (ECU)	4

Round of 64
Ibragim Mekhtiev (RUS)	8
Ahmed Abukahla (PLE)	0
Tony Grisman (GBR)	4
Cüneyt Hamid (DEN)	2
Juho Kostiainen (FIN)	2
Maxym Boytsov (UKR)	1
Diego Chango (ECU)	6
Abdallah Ahmed (EGY)	5

Round of 32
Ibragim Mekhtiev (RUS)	6
Tony Grisman (GBR)	11
Juho Kostiainen (FIN)	1
Diego Chango (ECU)	2

Round of 16
Tony Grisman (GBR)	4
Diego Chango (ECU)	1

==== Section 7 ====
Round of 128
Khusrav Giyosov (TJK)	DQ
~~Knowledge Muchakati (ZIM)~~
Joel Degboe (BEN)	6
Ahmed Amraoui (ALG)	2

Round of 64
Peter López (PER)	6
Khusrav Giyosov (TJK)	3
Byron Vázquez (ESA)	5
Arturo Sotomora (GUA)	3
Afifuddin Omar Sidek (MAS)	2
Hayder Shkara (AUS)	4
Joel Degboe (BEN)	2
Rohullah Nikpai (AFG)	13

Round of 32
Peter López (PER)	4
Byron Vázquez (ESA)	1
Hayder Shkara (AUS)	3
Rohullah Nikpai (AFG)	4

Round of 16
Peter López (PER)	8
Rohullah Nikpai (AFG)	3

==== Section 8 ====
Round of 128
Lê Huỳnh Châu (VIE)	DQ
~~Christopher Deleage (MON)~~
~~Ahmed Musbah (LBA)~~
Dorian Alexander (TRI)	DQ

Round of 64
José Antonio Carregal (ESP)	0
Lê Huỳnh Châu (VIE)	1
~~Francis Nduati (KEN)~~
Lo Tsung-jui (TPE)	DQ
Iulian Pitulac (ROU)	5
Makila Mawyngu (ANG)	4
Dorian Alexander (TRI)	3
Balla Dièye (SEN)	4

Round of 32
Lê Huỳnh Châu (VIE)	2
Lo Tsung-jui (TPE)	3
Iulian Pitulac (ROU)	1
Balla Dièye (SEN)	8

Round of 16
Lo Tsung-jui (TPE)	2
Balla Dièye (SEN)	7
