= Taekwondo at the 2015 Pan American Games – Men's 68 kg =

Taekwondo – Men's 68 kg at the 2015 Pan American Games
- Venue: Mississauga Sports Centre
- Dates: July 20
- Competitors: 13 from 13 nations

Medalists
Gold medal	Saúl Gutiérrez	Mexico
Silver medal	Maxime Potvin	Canada
Bronze medal	Luis Colon III	Puerto Rico
Bronze medal	Miguel Trejos	Colombia

The men's 68 kg competition of the taekwondo events at the 2015 Pan American Games took place on July 20 at the Mississauga Sports Centre. The defending Pan American Games champion was Jhohanny Jean of the Dominican Republic.

== Qualification ==
All athletes qualified through the qualification tournament held in March 2015 in Mexico, while host nation Canada was permitted to enter one athlete.

== Schedule ==
All times are Eastern Daylight Time (UTC-4).

Date	Time	Round
July 20, 2015	14:20	Preliminaries
July 20, 2015	15:35	Quarterfinals
July 20, 2015	16:20	Semifinals
July 20, 2015	20:50	Bronze medal matches/Final

== Results ==
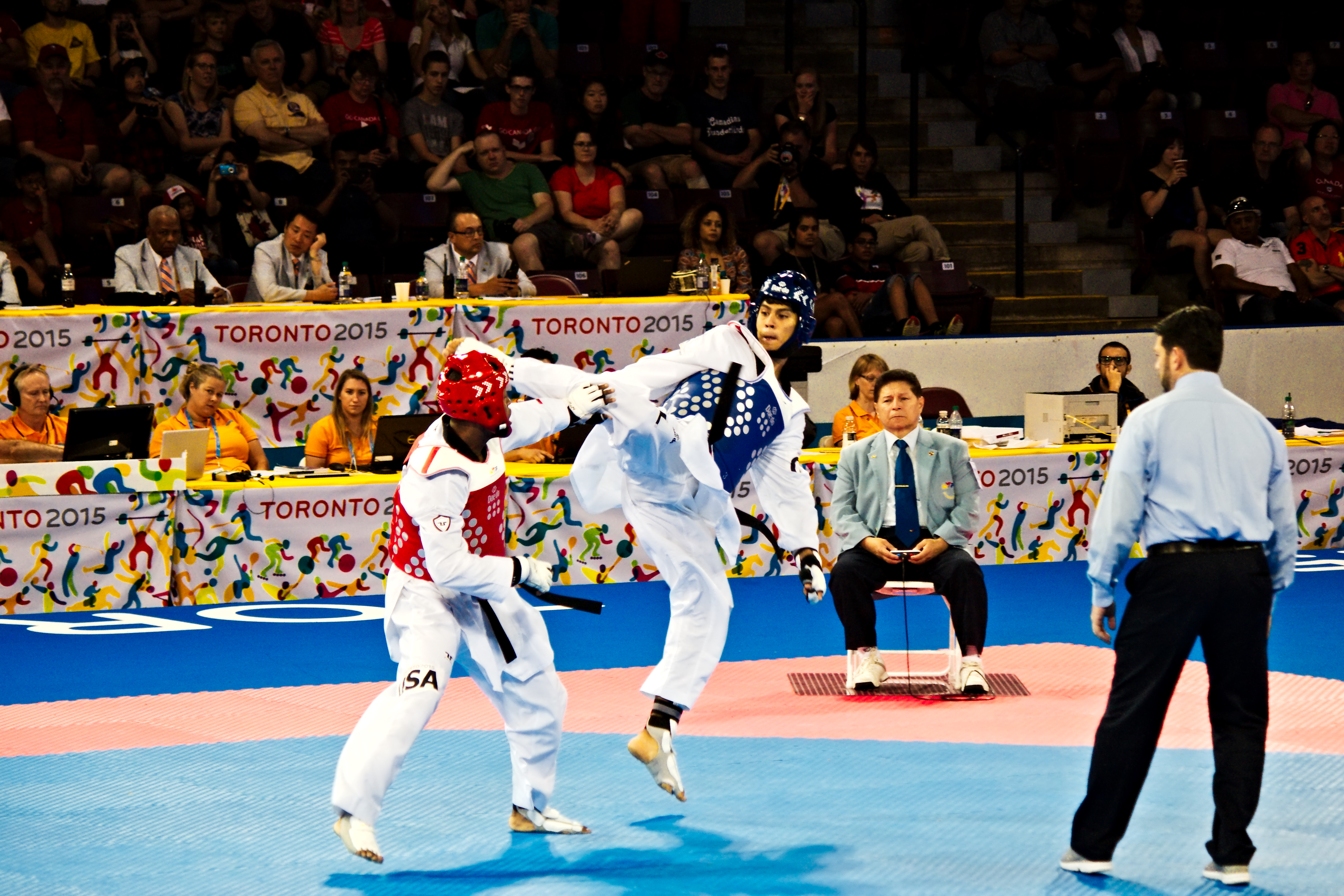
The match between Terrence Jennings (USA) and Edgar Contreras (VEN)

=== Main bracket ===
The final results were:

Preliminary round
Miguel Trejos (COL)	11
Dorian Alexander (TRI)	5
Andreas Zelaya (GUA)	9
Tosh van Dijk (SUR)	10
Ignacio Morales (CHI)	5
Luis Colon III (PUR)	17
Fermin Quesada (CUB)	7
Edgar Contreras (VEN)	10
Federico González (URU)	1
Henrique Precioso (BRA)	4

Quarter-finals
Saúl Gutiérrez (MEX)	4
Miguel Trejos (COL)	2
Tosh van Dijk (SUR)	7
Luis Colon III (PUR)	8
Terrence Jennings (USA)	12
Edgar Contreras (VEN)	11
Henrique Precioso (BRA)	5
Maxime Potvin (CAN)	15

Semi-finals
Saúl Gutiérrez (MEX)	5
Luis Colon III (PUR)	2
Terrence Jennings (USA)	11
Maxime Potvin (CAN)	13

Gold medal match
Saúl Gutiérrez (MEX)	6
Maxime Potvin (CAN)	3

=== Bronze medal matches ===
Bronze medal match
Luis Colon III (PUR)	6
Henrique Precioso (BRA)	3

Bronze medal match
Miguel Trejos (COL)	16
Terrence Jennings (USA)	6
