= Poland at the 2012 Summer Olympics =

- IOC code: POL
- NOC: Polish Olympic Committee
- Website: www.pkol.pl (in Polish)

in London
- Competitors: 217 in 22 sports
- Flag bearers: Agnieszka Radwańska (opening); Michał Jeliński (closing)
- Medals Ranked 24th: Gold 3 Silver 2 Bronze 6 Total 11

Summer Olympics appearances (overview)
- 1924; 1928; 1932; 1936; 1948; 1952; 1956; 1960; 1964; 1968; 1972; 1976; 1980; 1984; 1988; 1992; 1996; 2000; 2004; 2008; 2012; 2016; 2020; 2024; 2028

Other related appearances
- Russian Empire (1900, 1912); Austria (1908–1912)

Poland competed at the 2012 Summer Olympics in London, from 27 July to 12 August 2012. This was the nation's twentieth appearance at the Summer Olympics, having missed the 1984 Summer Olympics in Los Angeles because of the Soviet boycott. The Polish Olympic Committee (Polish: Polski Komitet Olimpijski, PKO) sent a total of 218 athletes to the Games, 130 men and 88 women, to compete in 22 sports.

Poland left London with a total of 11 Olympic medals (2 gold, 3 silver, and 6 bronze), tying with Beijing for the nation's highest overall number of medals. Two of the medals were awarded to the team in athletics, sailing, and weightlifting. Among the nation's medalists were shot putter Tomasz Majewski, who successfully defended his Olympic title from Beijing, and double sculls pair Magdalena Fularczyk and Julia Michalska, who became the first Polish women to claim an Olympic rowing medal in 32 years. Windsurfers Przemysław Miarczyński and Zofia Klepacka recaptured their nation's success in sailing, as they each won the bronze medal. Anita Włodarczyk, the silver medalist in the hammer throw, was upgraded to gold after Russian Tatyana Lysenko was disqualified for doping.

Several Polish athletes, however, suffered setbacks at these Olympic Games. Tennis player Agnieszka Radwańska, who ranked second by the Women's Tennis Association, was surprisingly eliminated in the first round of women's singles. Meanwhile, the men's indoor volleyball team, champions of the 2012 FIVB World League, failed to advance into the semi-finals for the third consecutive time, after losing to Russia in the quarterfinals. Star sailor and double Olympic medalist Mateusz Kusznierewicz, and the men's quadruple sculls team, led by Michał Jeliński, finished outside of the medal standings in the final race.

== Medalists ==
Medal	Name	Sport	Event	Date
Gold	Tomasz Majewski	Athletics	Men's shot put	3 August
Gold	Adrian Zieliński	Weightlifting	Men's 85 kg	3 August
Gold	Anita Włodarczyk	Athletics	Women's hammer throw	10 August
Silver	Sylwia Bogacka	Shooting	Women's 10 m air rifle	28 July
Silver	Bartłomiej Bonk	Weightlifting	Men's 105 kg	6 August
Bronze	Magdalena Fularczyk; Julia Michalska	Rowing	Women's double sculls	3 August
Bronze	Tomasz Zieliński	Weightlifting	Men's 94 kg	4 August
Bronze	Damian Janikowski	Wrestling	Men's Greco-Roman 84 kg	6 August
Bronze	Przemysław Miarczyński	Sailing	Men's sailboard	7 August
Bronze	Zofia Klepacka	Sailing	Women's sailboard	7 August
Bronze	Beata Mikołajczyk; Karolina Naja	Canoeing	Women's K-2 500 m	9 August

Medals by sport
Sport	1st place, gold medalist(s)	2nd place, silver medalist(s)	3rd place, bronze medalist(s)	Total
Athletics	2	0	0	2
Weightlifting	1	1	1	3
Shooting	0	1	0	1
Sailing	0	0	2	2
Canoeing	0	0	1	1
Rowing	0	0	1	1
Wrestling	0	0	1	1
Total	3	2	6	11

== Delegation ==
Polski Komitet Olimpijski (POK) selected a team of 218 athletes, 130 men and 88 women, to compete in 22 sports; it was the nation's fourth-largest team sent to the Olympics. Men's volleyball was the only team-based sport in which Poland had its representation in these Olympic Games. There was only a single competitor in boxing, equestrian eventing, rhythmic gymnastics, and taekwondo. Athletics was the largest team by sport, with a total of 60 competitors.

The Polish team included five past Olympic champions, two of them defending (shot putter Tomasz Majewski, and the men's quadruple sculls team, led by Michał Jeliński). Five Polish athletes, on the other hand, competed at their fifth Olympic Games: rowers Marek Kolbowicz and Adam Korol, sailor and double medalist Mateusz Kusznierewicz, hammer thrower and former champion Szymon Ziółkowski, and sprint kayaker and three-time medalist Aneta Konieczna. Dressage rider Katarzyna Milczarek, at age 46, was the oldest athlete of the team, while relay swimmer Diana Sokołowska was the youngest at age 17.

Other notable Polish athletes featured table tennis player Natalia Partyka, who competed for the second time at both Olympic and Paralympic games, swimmer and triple Olympic medalist Otylia Jędrzejczak in the women's butterfly event, double Olympic medalist Sylwia Gruchała in women's foil fencing, windsurfer and multiple-time world champion Przemysław Miarczyński, and sisters Agnieszka and Urszula Radwańska, who both played in the women's tennis doubles. Agnieszka Radwańska, who ranked second by the Women's Tennis Association, became the first Polish female flag bearer at the opening ceremony.

The following is the list of number of competitors participating in the Games:

Sport	Men	Women	Total
Archery	1	1	2
Athletics	34	25	59
Badminton	4	2	6
Boxing	0	1	1
Canoeing	8	5	13
Cycling	8	4	12
Equestrian	2	2	4
Fencing	2	5	7
Gymnastics	1	2	3
Judo	3	3	6
Modern pentathlon	1	2	3
Rowing	20	6	26
Sailing	7	4	11
Shooting	0	4	4
Swimming	10	8	18
Table tennis	1	3	4
Taekwondo	1	0	1
Tennis	3	4	7
Triathlon	1	2	3
Volleyball	14	0	14
Weightlifting	6	3	9
Wrestling	2	2	4
Total	129	88	217

== Archery ==
Poland has qualified one archer for the men's individual event, and the other for the women's individual event.

Athlete	Event	Ranking round		Round of 64	Round of 32	Round of 16	Quarterfinals	Semifinals	Final / BM	
Athlete	Event	Score	Seed	Opposition Score	Opposition Score	Opposition Score	Opposition Score	Opposition Score	Opposition Score	Rank
Rafał Dobrowolski	Men's individual	672	14	Xavier (BRA) (51); W 7–3	Banerjee (IND) (46); W 7–3	Oh J-h (KOR) (3); L 0–6	Did not advance			
Natalia Leśniak	Women's individual	639	38	Xu J (CHN) (27); L 2–6	Did not advance					

== Athletics ==
Polish athletes have so far achieved qualifying standards in the following athletics events (up to a maximum of 3 athletes in each event at the 'A' Standard, and 1 at the 'B' Standard):

Key

- Note–Ranks given for track events are within the athlete's heat only
- Q = Qualified for the next round
- q = Qualified for the next round as a fastest loser or, in field events, by position without achieving the qualifying target
- NR = National record
- N/A = Round not applicable for the event
- Bye = Athlete not required to compete in round

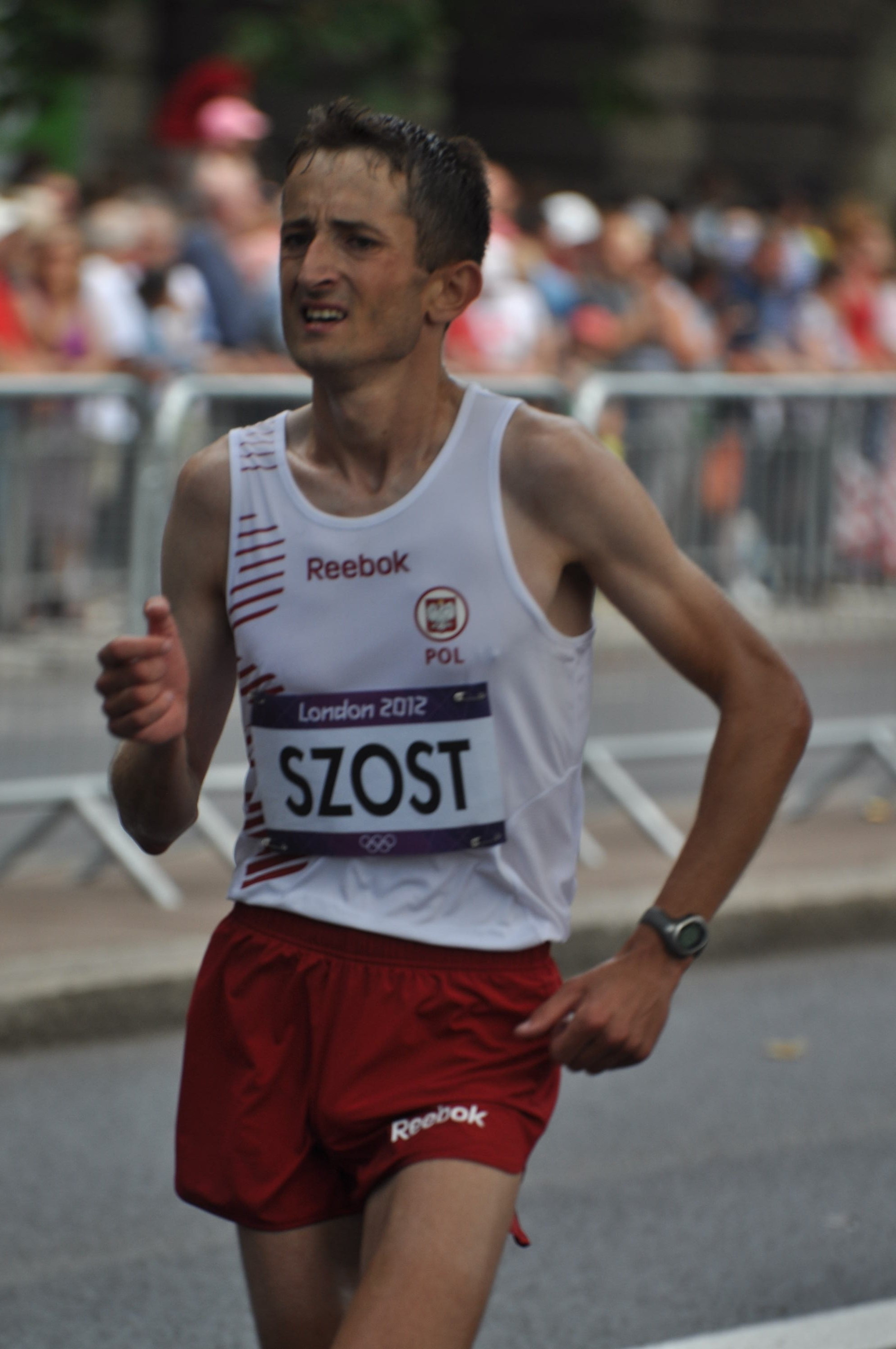
Henryk Szost finished ninth in men's marathon.

Men
Track & road events

Athlete	Event	Heat		Quarterfinal		Semifinal		Final	
Athlete	Event	Result	Rank	Result	Rank	Result	Rank	Result	Rank
Rafał Augustyn	20 km walk	—N/a						1:23:17	29
Rafał Fedaczyński	50 km walk	—N/a						DNF	
Kamil Kryński	200 m	20.66	3 Q	—N/a		20.83	6	Did not advance	
Adam Kszczot	800 m	1:45.99	3 Q	—N/a		1:45.34	3	Did not advance	
Dariusz Kuć	100 m	Bye		10.24	4	Did not advance			
Marcin Lewandowski	800 m	1:47.64	5 q*	—N/a		1:45.08	4	Did not advance	
Marcin Marciniszyn	400 m	46.35	6	—N/a		Did not advance			
Artur Noga	110 m hurdles	DNF		—N/a		Did not advance			
Łukasz Nowak	50 km walk	—N/a						3:42:47	6
Łukasz Parszczyński	3000 m steeplechase	8:30.08	9	—N/a				Did not advance	
Rafał Sikora	50 km walk	—N/a						3:47:47	15
Grzegorz Sudoł	20 km walk	—N/a						1:22:40	24
Henryk Szost	Marathon	—N/a						2:12:28	9
Dawid Tomala	20 km walk	—N/a						1:21:55	19
Jakub Adamski; Kamil Kryński; Robert Kubaczyk; Dariusz Kuć; Kamil Masztak; Artur Zaczek	4 × 100 m relay	38.31	6	—N/a				Did not advance	
Kamil Budziejewski; Patryk Dobek; Kacper Kozłowski; Marcin Marciniszyn; Michał Pietrzak; Piotr Wiaderek	4 × 400 m relay	3:02.86	5	—N/a				Did not advance	

* Advanced by judges decision after being pushed by Kuwait's Mohammad Al-Azemi in the prelims.

Field events

Athlete	Event	Qualification		Final	
Athlete	Event	Distance	Position	Distance	Position
Przemysław Czajkowski	Discus throw	61.08	22	Did not advance	
Paweł Fajdek	Hammer throw	NM	—	Did not advance	
Igor Janik	Javelin throw	78.90	19	Did not advance	
Tomasz Majewski	Shot put	21.03	3 Q	21.89	1st place, gold medalist(s)
Piotr Małachowski	Discus throw	64.65	7 q	67.19	5
Łukasz Michalski	Pole vault	5.60	8 q	5.50	11
Bartosz Osewski	Javelin throw	71.19	42	Did not advance	
Paweł Rakoczy	Javelin throw	77.36	28	Did not advance	
Robert Urbanek	Discus throw	59.56	32	Did not advance	
Paweł Wojciechowski	Pole vault	NM	—	Did not advance	
Szymon Ziółkowski	Hammer throw	76.22	7 q	77.10	7

Women
Track & road events

Athlete	Event	Heat		Quarterfinal		Semifinal		Final	
Athlete	Event	Result	Rank	Result	Rank	Result	Rank	Result	Rank
Paulina Buziak	20 km walk	—N/a						1:35:23	45
Agnieszka Dygacz	20 km walk	—N/a						1:31:28	23
Karolina Jarzyńska	Marathon	—N/a						2:30:57	36
Marta Jeschke	100 m	Bye		11.42	6	Did not advance			
Anna Jesień	400 m hurdles	55.44	4 q	—N/a		56.28	7	Did not advance	
Anna Kiełbasińska	200 m	23.67	7	—N/a		Did not advance			
Katarzyna Kowalska	3000 m steeplechase	9:48.60	11	—N/a				Did not advance	
Renata Pliś	1500 m	4:19.62	13	—N/a		Did not advance			
Matylda Szlęzak	3000 m steeplechase	10:08.84	14	—N/a				Did not advance	
Agnieszka Szwarnóg	20 km walk	—N/a						1:31:14	22
Marta Jeschke; Anna Kiełbasińska; Daria Korczyńska; Martyna Opoń; Marika Popowicz; Ewelina Ptak	4 × 100 m relay	43.07	4	—N/a				Did not advance	
Iga Baumgart; Agata Bednarek; Magdalena Gorzkowska; Anna Jesień; Justyna Święty; Patrycja Wyciszkiewicz	4 × 400 m relay	3:30.15	5	—N/a				Did not advance	

Field events

Athlete	Event	Qualification		Final	
Athlete	Event	Distance	Position	Distance	Position
Joanna Fiodorow	Hammer throw	70.48	12 q	72.37	8
Żaneta Glanc	Discus throw	59.88	24	Did not advance	
Monika Pyrek	Pole vault	4.40	15	Did not advance	
Anna Rogowska	Pole vault	4.55	5 q	NM	—
Anita Włodarczyk	Hammer throw	75.68	1 Q	77.60	1st place, gold medalist(s)

Combined events – Heptathlon

Athlete	Event	100H	HJ	SP	200 m	LJ	JT	800 m	Final	Rank
Karolina Tymińska	Result	13.22	1.68	13.74	23.71	DNS	—	—	DNF	
Karolina Tymińska	Points	1091	830	777	1009	0	—	—	DNF	

== Badminton ==
Athlete	Event	Group Stage				Elimination	Quarterfinal	Semifinal	Final / BM	
Athlete	Event	Opposition Score	Opposition Score	Opposition Score	Rank	Opposition Score	Opposition Score	Opposition Score	Opposition Score	Rank
Przemysław Wacha	Men's singles	Chen J (CHN); L 21–15, 21–8	—N/a		2	Did not advance				
Adam Cwalina; Michał Łogosz*	Men's doubles	Ko S-h / Yoo Y-s (KOR); L 21–17, 7–21, 13–21	Isara / Jongjit (THA); L 0–21, 0–21	Ahsan / Septano (INA); L 0–21, 0–21	4	—N/a	Did not advance			
Kamila Augustyn	Women's singles	Baun (DEN); L 11–21, 6–21	Prokopenko (RUS); L 16–21, 17–21	—N/a	3	Did not advance				
Robert Mateusiak; Nadieżda Zięba	Mixed doubles	Fischer Nielsen / Pedersen (DEN); L 9–21, 21–14, 17–21	Ikeda / Shiota (JPN); W 21–18, 22–20	Ng / Gao (CAN); W 21–13, 21–16	2 Q	—N/a	Xu C / Ma J (CHN); L 21–19, 16–21, 21–23	Did not advance		

* Adam Cwalina / Michał Łogosz retired after first match. All matches after were valued as 0-21, 0-21

== Boxing ==
Women

Athlete	Event	Round of 16	Quarterfinals	Semifinals	Final	
Athlete	Event	Opposition Result	Opposition Result	Opposition Result	Opposition Result	Rank
Karolina Michalczuk	Flyweight	Kom (IND); L 14–19	Did not advance			

== Canoeing ==
=== Slalom ===
Athlete	Event	Preliminary						Semifinal		Final	
Athlete	Event	Run 1	Rank	Run 2	Rank	Best	Rank	Time	Rank	Time	Rank
Grzegorz Kiljanek	Men's C-1	101.03	11	93.50	5	93.50	8 Q	106.14	9	Did not advance	
Mateusz Polaczyk	Men's K-1	88.51	4	88.60	7	88.51	7 Q	96.36	2 Q	96.14	4
Marcin Pochwała; Piotr Szczepański	Men's C-2	105.58	7	101.00	3	101.00	5 Q	109.81	4 Q	110.51	5
Natalia Pacierpnik	Women's K-1	110.58	11	102.38	7	102.38	9 Q	107.79	1 Q	115.80	7

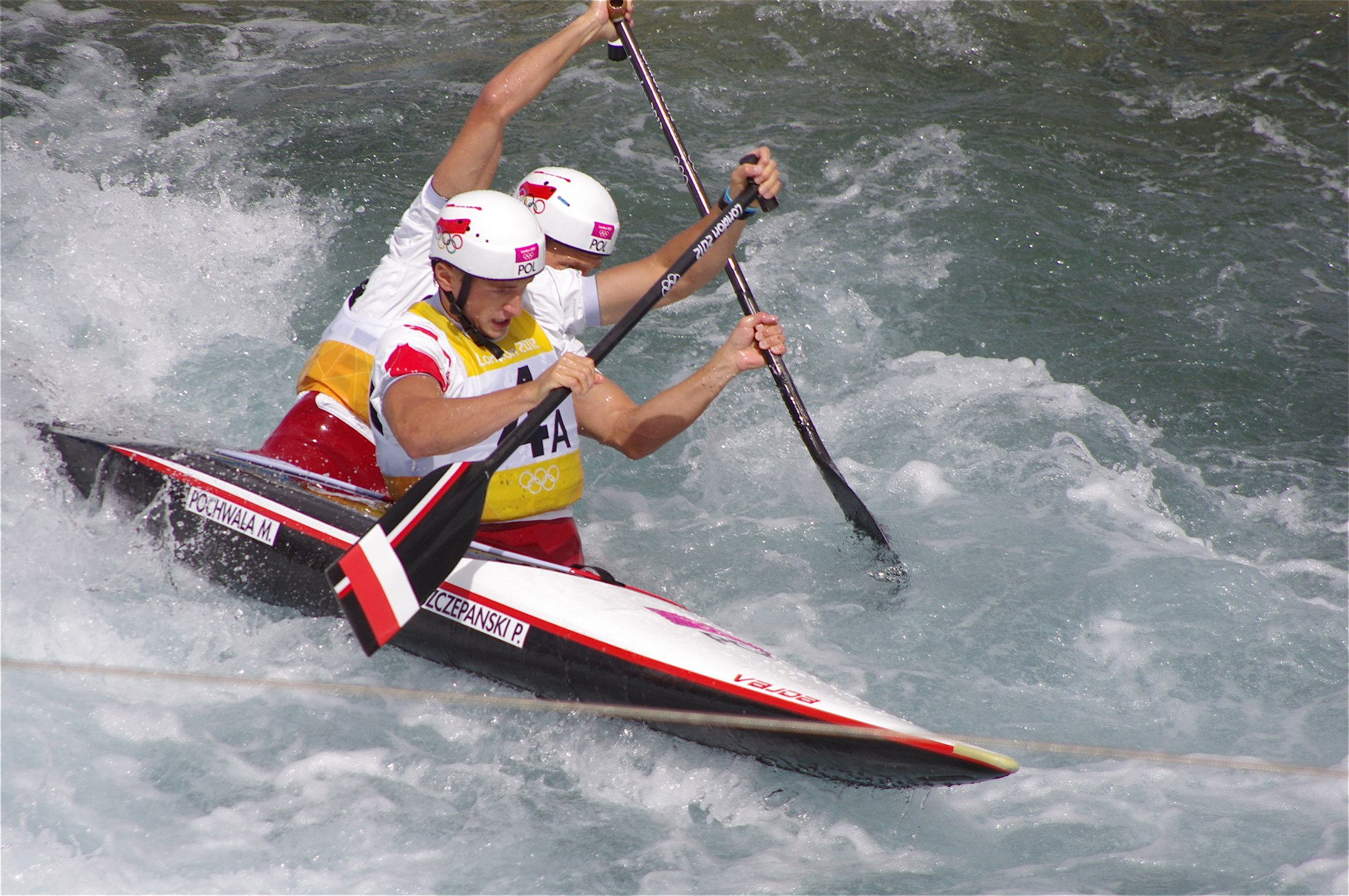
Piotr Szczepański and Marcin Pochwała in Men's slalom C-2

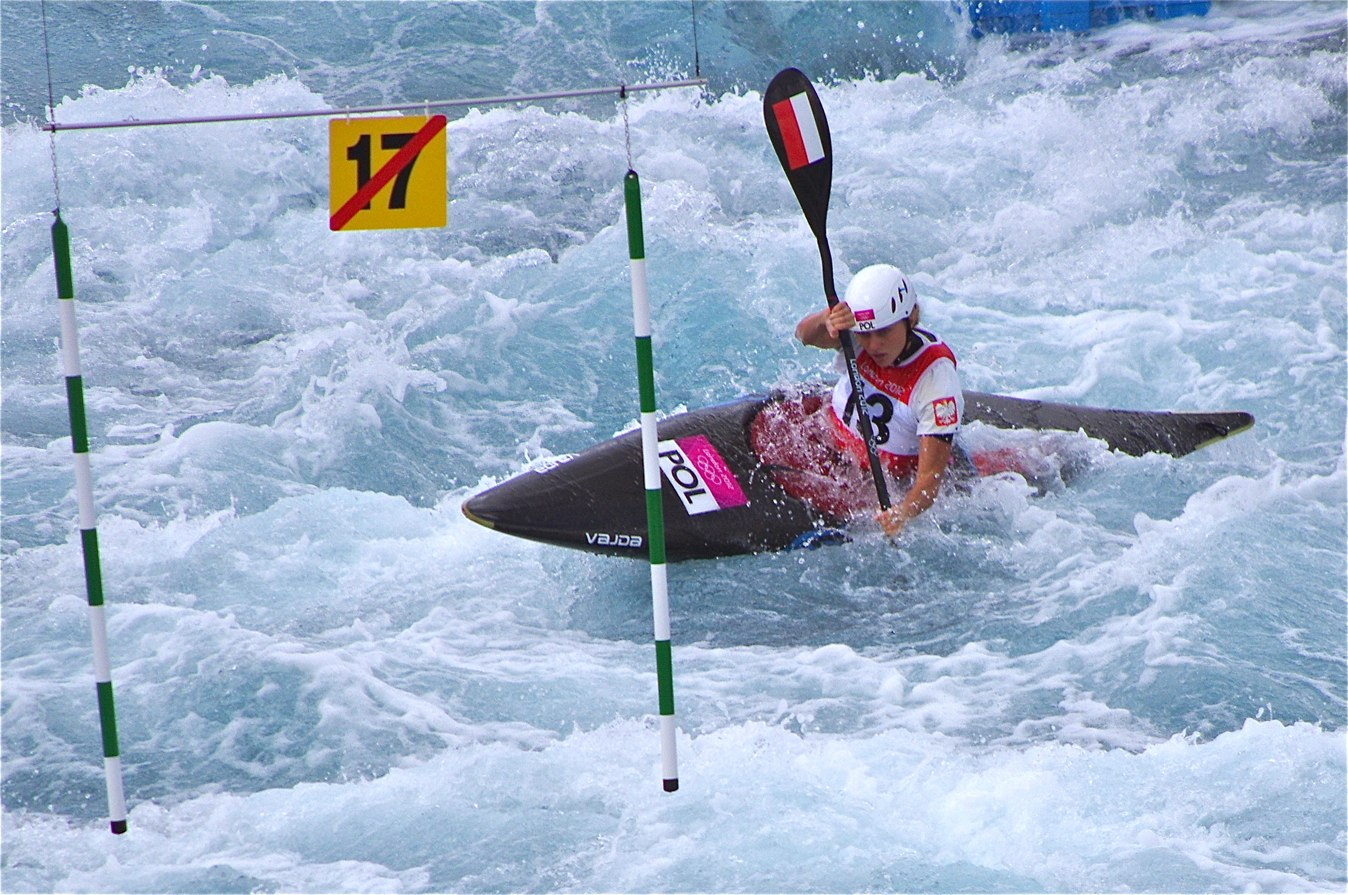
Natalia Pacierpnik in Women's slalom K-1

=== Sprint ===
Men

Athlete	Event	Heats		Semifinals		Finals	
Athlete	Event	Time	Rank	Time	Rank	Time	Rank
Piotr Kuleta	C-1 200 m	44.645	5 Q	45.348	7	Did not advance	
Piotr Kuleta	C-1 1000 m	4:04.889	5 Q	3:53.802	5 FB	3:54.414	9
Piotr Siemionowski	K-1 200 m	35.990	2 Q	36.507	6 FB	38.585	14
Marcin Grzybowski; Tomasz Kaczor	C-2 1000 m	3:38.759	5 Q	3:37.695	4 FB	3:37.692	9

Women

Athlete	Event	Heats		Semifinals		Finals	
Athlete	Event	Time	Rank	Time	Rank	Time	Rank
Marta Walczykiewicz	K-1 200 m	42.290	2 Q	40.905	2 FA	45.500	5
Aneta Konieczna	K-1 500 m	1:52.069	3 Q	1:52.193	4 FB	1:53.356	10
Beata Mikołajczyk; Karolina Naja	K-2 500 m	1:48.271	5 Q	1:41.873	3 FA	1:44.000	3rd place, bronze medalist(s)
Aneta Konieczna; Beata Mikołajczyk; Karolina Naja; Marta Walczykiewicz	K-4 500 m	1:35.943	5 Q	1:30.338	1 FA	1:31.607	4

Qualification Legend: FA = Qualify to final (medal); FB = Qualify to final B (non-medal)

== Cycling ==
=== Road ===
Athlete	Event	Time	Rank
Maciej Bodnar	Men's road race	5:46:37	84
Maciej Bodnar	Men's time trial	55:49.67	25
Michał Gołaś	Men's road race	Did not finish	
Michał Kwiatkowski	Men's road race	5:46:37	60
Katarzyna Pawłowska	Women's road race	3:35:56	11

=== Track ===
Sprint

Athlete	Event	Qualification		Round 1	Repechage 1	Round 2	Repechage 2	Quarterfinals	Semifinals	Final	
Athlete	Event	Time Speed (km/h)	Rank	Opposition Time Speed (km/h)	Opposition Time Speed (km/h)	Opposition Time Speed (km/h)	Opposition Time Speed (km/h)	Opposition Time Speed (km/h)	Opposition Time Speed (km/h)	Opposition Time Speed (km/h)	Rank
Damian Zieliński	Men's sprint	10.323; 69.747	14	Dmitriev (RUS); L	Nakagawa (JPN); L	Did not advance					

Team sprint

Athlete	Event	Qualification		Semifinals		Final	
Athlete	Event	Time Speed (km/h)	Rank	Opposition Time Speed (km/h)	Rank	Opposition Time Speed (km/h)	Rank
Maciej Bielecki; Kamil Kuczyński; Damian Zieliński	Men's team sprint	44.712; 60.386	10	Did not advance			

Keirin

Athlete	Event	1st Round	Repechage	2nd Round	Final
Athlete	Event	Rank	Rank	Rank	Rank
Kamil Kuczyński	Men's keirin	4 Q	4	Did not advance	13

Omnium

Athlete	Event	Flying lap		Points race		Elimination race	Individual pursuit		Scratch race	Time trial		Total points	Rank
Athlete	Event	Time	Rank	Points	Rank	Rank	Time	Rank	Rank	Time	Rank	Total points	Rank
Małgorzata Wojtyra	Women's omnium	14.754	13	34	1	10	3:45.083	12	13	36.790	14	63	11

=== Mountain biking ===
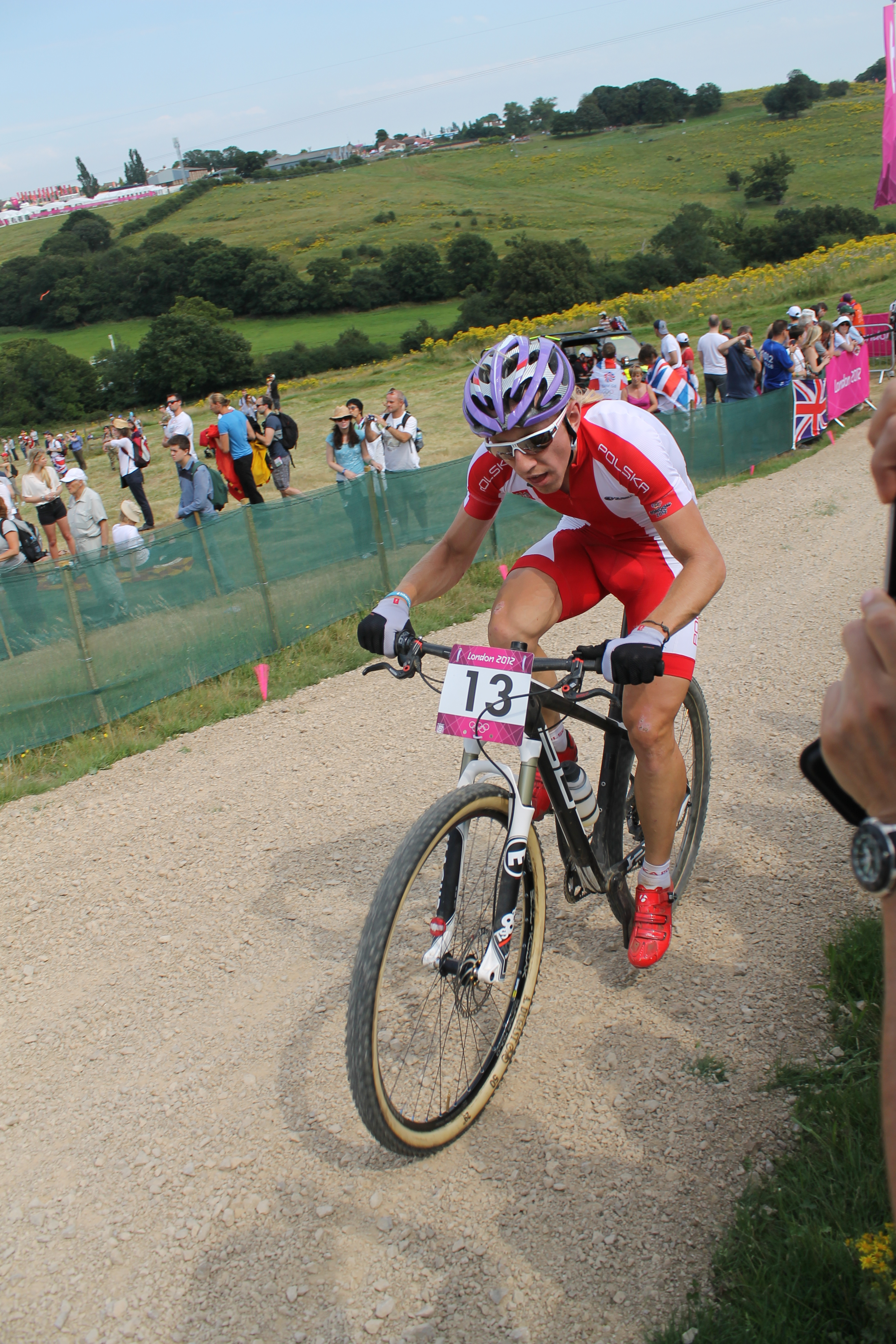
Marek Konwa in men's cross-country race

Athlete	Event	Time	Rank
Piotr Brzózka	Men's cross-country	1:38:37	32
Marek Konwa	Men's cross-country	1:32:41	16
Aleksandra Dawidowicz	Women's cross-country	1:33:20	7
Paula Gorycka	Women's cross-country	1:39:18	22

== Equestrian ==
=== Dressage ===
Athlete	Horse	Event	Grand Prix		Grand Prix Special		Grand Prix Freestyle		Overall	
Athlete	Horse	Event	Score	Rank	Score	Rank	Technical	Artistic	Score	Rank
Katarzyna Milczarek	Ekwador	Individual	69.286	38	Did not advance					
Michał Rapcewicz	Randon	Individual	66.915	45	Did not advance					
Beata Stremler	Martini	Individual	69.422	36	Did not advance					
Katarzyna Milczarek; Michał Rapcewicz; Beata Stremler	See above	Team	68.541	8	Did not advance		—N/a		68.541	8

=== Eventing ===
Athlete	Horse	Event	Dressage		Cross-country			Jumping						Total	
Athlete	Horse	Event	Dressage		Cross-country			Qualifier			Final			Total	
Athlete	Horse	Event	Penalties	Rank	Penalties	Total	Rank	Penalties	Total	Rank	Penalties	Total	Rank	Penalties	Rank
Paweł Spisak	Wag	Individual	54.80	51	22.40	77.20	40	Withdrew						77.20	57

== Fencing ==
Poland has qualified 7 athletes.

Men

Athlete	Event	Round of 64	Round of 32	Round of 16	Quarterfinal	Semifinal	Final / BM	
Athlete	Event	Opposition Score	Opposition Score	Opposition Score	Opposition Score	Opposition Score	Opposition Score	Rank
Radosław Zawrotniak	Individual épée	—N/a	Bouzaid (SEN); L 9–15	Did not advance				
Adam Skrodzki	Individual sabre	Lam (HKG); W 15–10	Limbach (GER); L 8–15	Did not advance				

Women

Athlete	Event	Round of 64	Round of 32	Round of 16	Quarterfinal	Semifinal	Final / BM	
Athlete	Event	Opposition Score	Opposition Score	Opposition Score	Opposition Score	Opposition Score	Opposition Score	Rank
Magdalena Piekarska	Individual épée	Bye	Géroudet (SUI); L 14–15	Did not advance				
Sylwia Gruchała	Individual foil	Bye	Ikehata (JPN); L 8–9	Did not advance				
Martyna Synoradzka	Individual foil	Bye	Gafurzianova (RUS); L 8–15	Did not advance				
Małgorzata Wojtkowiak	Individual foil	Bye	Chen Jy (CHN); L 8–15	Did not advance				
Karolina Chlewińska; Sylwia Gruchała; Martyna Synoradzka; Małgorzata Wojtkowiak	Team foil	—N/a			France; L 31–42	Classification semi-final Great Britain; W 45–30	5th place final United States; W 45–39	5
Aleksandra Socha	Individual sabre	—N/a	Sassine (CAN); W 15–7	Vougiouka (GRE); L 7–15	Did not advance			

== Gymnastics ==
=== Artistic ===
Men

Athlete	Event	Qualification								Final							
Athlete	Event	Apparatus						Total	Rank	Apparatus						Total	Rank
Athlete	Event	F	PH	R	V	PB	HB	Total	Rank	F	PH	R	V	PB	HB	Total	Rank
Roman Kulesza	All-around	13.933	12.966	13.466	14.900	14.700	14.733	84.698	28 Q	13.866	13.000	13.866	14.400	15.100	13.933	84.165	24

Women

Athlete	Event	Qualification						Final					
Athlete	Event	Apparatus				Total	Rank	Apparatus				Total	Rank
Athlete	Event	F	V	UB	BB	Total	Rank	F	V	UB	BB	Total	Rank
Marta Pihan-Kulesza	All-around	14.333	13.833	14.033	12.166	54.365	26 Q	14.266	13.933	14.333	12.933	55.465	19

=== Rhythmic ===
Athlete	Event	Qualification						Final					
Athlete	Event	Hoop	Ball	Clubs	Ribbon	Total	Rank	Hoop	Ball	Clubs	Ribbon	Total	Rank
Joanna Mitrosz	Individual	27.425	27.250	27.625	27.450	109.750	8 Q	27.475	27.150	26.850	27.425	108.900	9

== Judo ==
Men

Athlete	Event	Round of 64	Round of 32	Round of 16	Quarterfinals	Semifinals	Repechage	Final / BM	
Athlete	Event	Opposition Result	Opposition Result	Opposition Result	Opposition Result	Opposition Result	Opposition Result	Opposition Result	Rank
Paweł Zagrodnik	−66 kg	Bye	Cunha (BRA); W 0011–0001	Nazaryan (ARM); W 0111–0102	Ungvári (HUN); L 0002–0010	Did not advance	Karimov (AZE); W 0010–0000	Ebinuma (JPN); L 0101–0110	5
Tomasz Adamiec	−73 kg	Bye	Legrand (FRA); L 0000–0010	Did not advance					
Janusz Wojnarowicz	+100 kg	—N/a	Riner (FRA); L 0003–0010	Did not advance					

Women

Athlete	Event	Round of 32	Round of 16	Quarterfinals	Semifinals	Repechage	Final / BM	
Athlete	Event	Opposition Result	Opposition Result	Opposition Result	Opposition Result	Opposition Result	Opposition Result	Rank
Katarzyna Kłys	−70 kg	Chen F (CHN); L 0000–1001	Did not advance					
Daria Pogorzelec	−78 kg	Velenšek (SLO); W 0001–0000	Wollert (GER); W 0020–0000	Aguiar (BRA); L 0000–0020	Did not advance	Joó (HUN); L 0022–1012	Did not advance	7
Urszula Sadkowska	+78 kg	Bye	Tong W (CHN); L 0000–0101	Did not advance				

== Modern pentathlon ==
Athlete	Event	Fencing (épée one touch)			Swimming (200 m freestyle)			Riding (show jumping)			Combined: shooting/running (10 m air pistol)/(3000 m)			Total points	Final rank
Athlete	Event	Results	Rank	MP points	Time	Rank	MP points	Penalties	Rank	MP points	Time	Rank	MP Points	Total points	Final rank
Szymon Staśkiewicz	Men's	14–21	29	736	2:11.54	32	1224	20	4	1180	10:56.31	18	2376	5516	24
Sylwia Gawlikowska	Women's	17–18	19	808	2:17.35	13	1152	52	10	1148	12:15.27	14	2060	5168	13
Katarzyna Wójcik	Women's	16–19	22	784	2:20.94	24	1112	60	14	1140	12:17.69	16	2052	5088	19

== Rowing ==
Men

Athlete	Event	Heats		Repechage		Quarterfinals		Semifinals		Final	
Athlete	Event	Time	Rank	Time	Rank	Time	Rank	Time	Rank	Time	Rank
Michał Słoma	Single sculls	6:54.58	3 QF	Bye		7:21.55	5 SC/D	7:39.00	3 FC	7:34.98	17
Jarosław Godek; Wojciech Gutorski	Pair	6:19.98	3 SA/B	Bye		—N/a		7:04.58	4 FB	6:56.00	10
Michał Jeliński; Marek Kolbowicz; Adam Korol; Konrad Wasielewski	Quadruple sculls	5:40.56	2 SA/B	Bye		—N/a		6:10.75	3 FA	5:51.74	6
Miłosz Bernatajtys; Łukasz Pawłowski; Paweł Rańda; Łukasz Siemion	Lightweight four	5:53.52	4 R	6:04.46	4	—N/a		Did not advance			
Krystian Aranowski; Marcin Brzeziński; Mikołaj Burda; Rafał Hejmej; Piotr Hojka; Piotr Juszczak; Zbigniew Schodowski; Michał Szpakowski; Daniel Trojanowski (cox)	Eight	5:35.64	3 R	5:30.34	5 FA	—N/a				5:57.67	7

Women

Athlete	Event	Heats		Repechage		Final	
Athlete	Event	Time	Rank	Time	Rank	Time	Rank
Magdalena Fularczyk; Julia Michalska	Double sculls	6:50.85	2 FA	Bye		7:07.92	3rd place, bronze medalist(s)
Joanna Leszczyńska; Sylwia Lewandowska; Natalia Madaj; Kamila Soćko	Quadruple sculls	6:21.44	3 R	6:23.19	5 FB	6:57.20	8

Qualification Legend: FA=Final A (medal); FB=Final B (non-medal); FC=Final C (non-medal); FD=Final D (non-medal); FE=Final E (non-medal); FF=Final F (non-medal); SA/B=Semifinals A/B; SC/D=Semifinals C/D; SE/F=Semifinals E/F; QF=Quarterfinals; R=Repechage

== Sailing ==
Poland has so far qualified 1 boat for each of the following events:

Men

Athlete	Event	Race											Net points	Final rank
Athlete	Event	1	2	3	4	5	6	7	8	9	10	M*	Net points	Final rank
Przemysław Miarczyński	RS:X	2	2	7	4	~~13~~	3	7	4	13	9	4	60	3rd place, bronze medalist(s)
Kacper Ziemiński	Laser	22	13	8	24	18	15	~~29~~	11	22	12	EL	145	17
Piotr Kula	Finn	~~25~~	16	17	16	13	20	25	11	14	16	EL	148	16
Mateusz Kusznierewicz; Dominik Życki	Star	9	3	12	10	3	4	2	9	~~13~~	2	9	72	8

Women

Athlete	Event	Race											Net points	Final rank
Athlete	Event	1	2	3	4	5	6	7	8	9	10	M*	Net points	Final rank
Zofia Klepacka	RS:X	5	2	12	3	1	1	9	~~21~~	4	4	3	47	3rd place, bronze medalist(s)
Anna Weinzieher	Laser Radial	16	26	25	21	20	16	22	24	15	~~27~~	EL	185	22
Jolanta Ogar; Agnieszka Skrzypulec	470	13	14	~~20~~	18	7	2	18	8	11	10	EL	98	12

Open

Athlete	Event	Race																Net points	Final rank
Athlete	Event	1	2	3	4	5	6	7	8	9	10	11	12	13	14	15	M*	Net points	Final rank
Paweł Kołodziński; Łukasz Przybytek	49er	11	14	11	13	8	3	15	10	5	13	11	12	7	~~18~~	13	EL	146	13

M = Medal race; EL = Eliminated – did not advance into the medal race;

== Shooting ==
Poland has qualified for four quota places in shooting events;

Women

Athlete	Event	Qualification		Final	
Athlete	Event	Score	Rank	Score	Rank
Beata Bartków-Kwiatkowska	10 m air pistol	366	44	Did not advance	
Beata Bartków-Kwiatkowska	25 m pistol	567	35	Did not advance	
Sylwia Bogacka	50 m rifle 3 positions	583	8 Q	681.9	4
Sylwia Bogacka	10 m air rifle	399	1 Q	502.2	2nd place, silver medalist(s)
Agnieszka Nagay	50 m rifle 3 positions	584	5 Q	678.2	8
Paula Wrońska	10 m air rifle	390	47	Did not advance	

== Swimming ==
Polish swimmers have so far achieved qualifying standards in the following events (up to a maximum of 2 swimmers in each event at the Olympic Qualifying Time (OQT), and 1 at the Olympic Selection Time (OST)):

Men

Athlete	Event	Heat		Semifinal		Final	
Athlete	Event	Time	Rank	Time	Rank	Time	Rank
Marcin Cieślak	200 m butterfly	1:57.07	19	Did not advance			
Marcin Cieślak	200 m individual medley	2:00.45	19	Did not advance			
Konrad Czerniak	100 m freestyle	48.63	10 Q	48.44	9	Did not advance	
Konrad Czerniak	100 m butterfly	51.85	4 Q	51.78	7 Q	52.05	8
Radosław Kawęcki	200 m backstroke	1:58.18	14 Q	1:56.74	5 Q	1:55.59	4
Paweł Korzeniowski	200 m butterfly	1:56.09	11 Q	1:55.04	7 Q	1.55.08	7
Sławomir Kuczko	200 m breaststroke	2:12.51	21	Did not advance			
Kacper Majchrzak	50 m freestyle	23.00	33	Did not advance			
Mateusz Sawrymowicz	400 m freestyle	3:53.33	21	—N/a		Did not advance	
Mateusz Sawrymowicz	1500 m freestyle	14:57.59	8 Q	—N/a		14:54.32	7
Dawid Szulich	100 m breaststroke	1:02.07	32	Did not advance			
Marcin Tarczyński	100 m backstroke	55.06	27	Did not advance			
Radosław Kawęcki; Paweł Korzeniowski; Kacper Majchrzak; Dawid Szulich	4 × 100 m medley relay	3:38.16	16	—N/a		Did not advance	

Women

Athlete	Event	Heat		Semifinal		Final	
Athlete	Event	Time	Rank	Time	Rank	Time	Rank
Natalia Charlos	10 km open water	—N/a				1:59:58.7	15
Anna Dowgiert	50 m freestyle	25.59	30	Did not advance			
Otylia Jędrzejczak	100 m butterfly	59.31	25	Did not advance			
Otylia Jędrzejczak	200 m butterfly	2:09.33	16 Q	2:13.09	16	Did not advance	
Karolina Szczepaniak	400 m individual medley	4:52.50	31	—N/a		Did not advance	
Alicja Tchórz	100 m backstroke	1:01.44	25	Did not advance			
Alicja Tchórz	200 m backstroke	2:14.02	29	Did not advance			
Katarzyna Wilk	100 m freestyle	56.13	27	Did not advance			
Aleksandra Putra; Diana Sokołowska; Karolina Szczepaniak; Katarzyna Wilk	4 × 200 m freestyle relay	8:13.76	16	—N/a		Did not advance	

== Table tennis ==
Poland has qualified one athlete for singles table tennis events. Based on her world ranking as of 16 May 2011 Li Qian has qualified for the women's event.

Athlete	Event	Preliminary round	Round 1	Round 2	Round 3	Round 4	Quarterfinals	Semifinals	Final / BM	
Athlete	Event	Opposition Result	Opposition Result	Opposition Result	Opposition Result	Opposition Result	Opposition Result	Opposition Result	Opposition Result	Rank
Wang Zeng Yi	Men's singles	Bye	Hoyama (BRA); W 4–3	He Z W (ESP); L 3–4	Did not advance					
Li Qian	Women's singles	Bye			Huang Y-h (TPE); W 4–0	Ishikawa (JPN); L 1–4	Did not advance			
Natalia Partyka	Women's singles	Bye		Skov (DEN); W 4–3	Li J (NED); L 2–4	Did not advance				
Katarzyna Grzybowska; Li Qian; Natalia Partyka	Women's team	—N/a				Singapore; L 1–3	Did not advance			

== Taekwondo ==
Poland has qualified 1 athlete.

Athlete	Event	Round of 16	Quarterfinals	Semifinals	Repechage	Bronze Medal	Final	
Athlete	Event	Opposition Result	Opposition Result	Opposition Result	Opposition Result	Opposition Result	Opposition Result	Rank
Michał Łoniewski	Men's −68 kg	Nikpai (AFG); L 5–12	Did not advance					

== Tennis ==
Men

Athlete	Event	Round of 64	Round of 32	Round of 16	Quarterfinals	Semifinals	Final / BM	
Athlete	Event	Opposition Score	Opposition Score	Opposition Score	Opposition Score	Opposition Score	Opposition Score	Rank
Łukasz Kubot	Singles	Dimitrov (BUL); L 3–6, 6–7^{(4–7)}	Did not advance					
Mariusz Fyrstenberg; Marcin Matkowski	Doubles	—N/a	Ferrer / F. López (ESP); L 6–7^{(7–9)}, 7–6^{(8–6)}, 6–8	Did not advance				

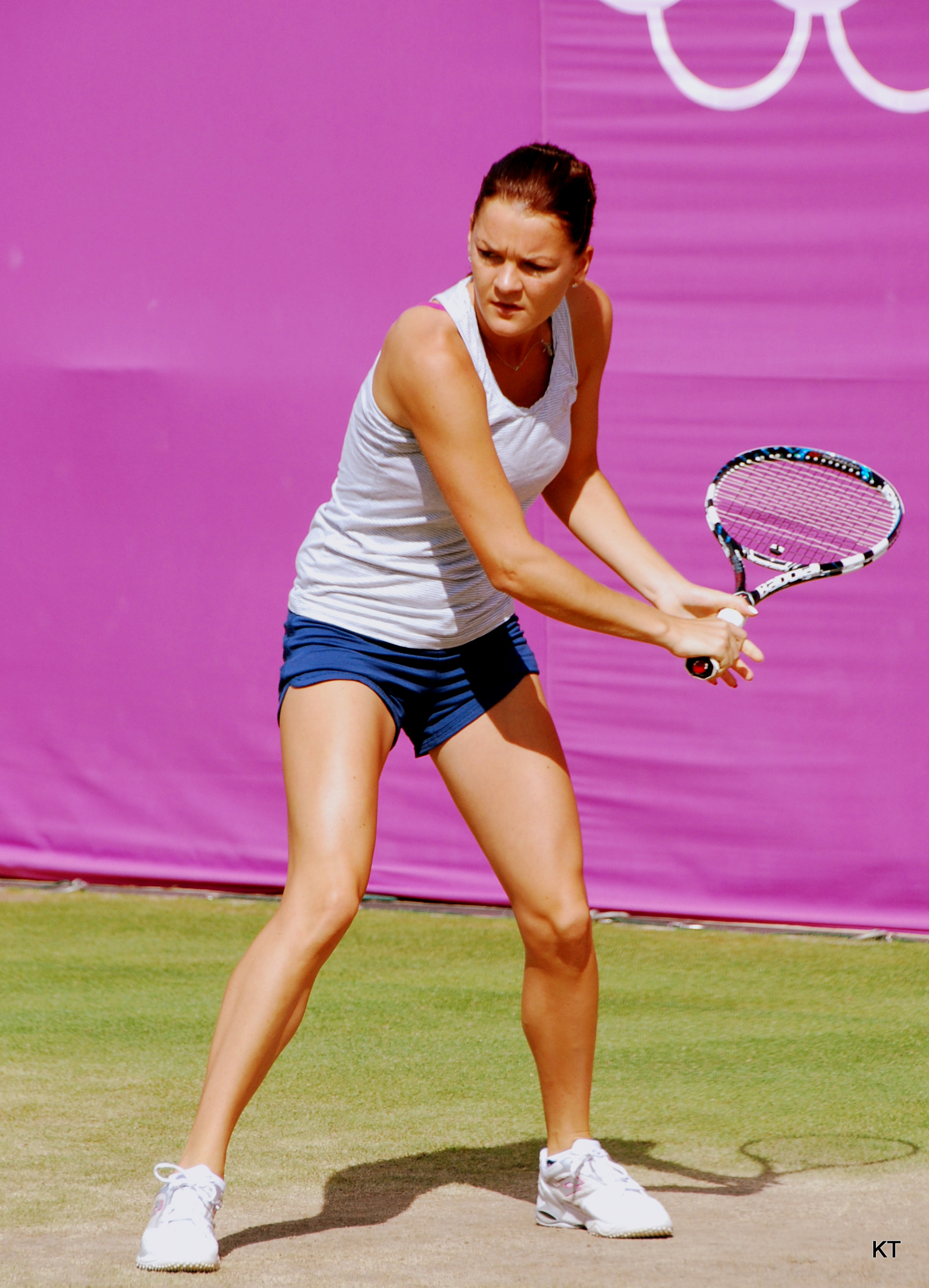
Agnieszka Radwańska in women's tennis singles.

Women

Athlete	Event	Round of 64	Round of 32	Round of 16	Quarterfinals	Semifinals	Final / BM	
Athlete	Event	Opposition Score	Opposition Score	Opposition Score	Opposition Score	Opposition Score	Opposition Score	Rank
Agnieszka Radwańska	Singles	Görges (GER); L 5–7, 7–6^{(7–5)}, 4–6	Did not advance					
Urszula Radwańska	Singles	Barthel (GER); W 6–4, 6–3	S. Williams (USA); L 2–6, 3–6	Did not advance				
Klaudia Jans-Ignacik; Alicja Rosolska	Doubles	—N/a	Kirilenko / Petrova (RUS); L 7–6^{(7–5)}, 3–6, 2–6	Did not advance				
Agnieszka Radwańska; Urszula Radwańska	Doubles	—N/a	Cibulková / Hantuchová (SVK); W 6–2, 6–1	Huber / Raymond (USA); L 4–6, 6–7^{(3–7)}	Did not advance			

Mixed

Athlete	Event	Round of 16	Quarterfinals	Semifinals	Final / BM	
Athlete	Event	Opposition Score	Opposition Score	Opposition Score	Opposition Score	Rank
Agnieszka Radwańska; Marcin Matkowski	Doubles	Stosur / Hewitt (AUS); L 3–6, 3–6	Did not advance			

== Triathlon ==
Athlete	Event	Swim (1.5 km)	Trans 1	Bike (40 km)	Trans 2	Run (10 km)	Total Time	Rank
Marek Jaskółka	Men's	17:58	0:41	59:45	0:29	33:45	1:52:38	47
Maria Cześnik	Women's	19:28	0:42	1:07:17	0:33	36:09	2:04:09	31
Agnieszka Jerzyk	Women's	19:47	0:41	1:06:57	0:32	34:55	2:02:52	25

== Volleyball ==
Poland has qualified men's teams for both the indoor tournament and the beach tournament.

- Men's indoor event – 1 team of 12 players
- Men's beach event – 1 team of 2 players

=== Men's beach tournament ===
Athlete	Event	Preliminary round	Standing	Round of 16	Quarterfinals	Semifinals	Final / BM	
Athlete	Event	Opposition Score	Standing	Opposition Score	Opposition Score	Opposition Score	Opposition Score	Rank
Grzegorz Fijałek; Mariusz Prudel	Men's	Pool D Samoilovs – Sorokins (LAT); L 1 – 2 (21–12, 15–21, 12–15); Gibb – Rosenthal (USA); W 2 – 0 (21–17, 21–18); Chiya – Goldschmidt (RSA); W 2 – 0 (21–19, 21–13)	2	Chevallier – Heyer (SUI); W 2 – 0 (21–18, 21–17)	Alison – Emanuel (BRA); L 1 – 2 (17–21, 21–16, 15–17)	Did not advance		5

=== Men's indoor tournament ===
Team roster

The following is the Polish roster in the men's volleyball tournament of the 2012 Summer Olympics.

Head coach: (Italy) Andrea Anastasi

№	Name	Date of birth	Height	Weight	Spike	Block	2012 club
1	Piotr Nowakowski	18 December 1987	2.05 m (6 ft 9 in)	90 kg (200 lb)	355 cm (140 in)	340 cm (130 in)	(Poland) Asseco Resovia
2	Michał Winiarski	28 September 1983	2.00 m (6 ft 7 in)	82 kg (181 lb)	355 cm (140 in)	335 cm (132 in)	(Poland) PGE Skra
4	Grzegorz Kosok	2 March 1983	2.06 m (6 ft 9 in)	92 kg (203 lb)	345 cm (136 in)	325 cm (128 in)	(Poland) Asseco Resovia
5	Paweł Zagumny	18 October 1977	2.00 m (6 ft 7 in)	88 kg (194 lb)	336 cm (132 in)	317 cm (125 in)	(Poland) ZAKSA
6	Bartosz Kurek	29 August 1988	2.05 m (6 ft 9 in)	87 kg (192 lb)	352 cm (139 in)	326 cm (128 in)	(Poland) PGE Skra
7	Jakub Jarosz	10 February 1987	1.95 m (6 ft 5 in)	84 kg (185 lb)	353 cm (139 in)	328 cm (129 in)	(Italy) Top Volley
9	Zbigniew Bartman	4 May 1987	1.98 m (6 ft 6 in)	83 kg (183 lb)	352 cm (139 in)	320 cm (130 in)	(Poland) Jastrzębski Węgiel
13	Michał Kubiak	23 February 1988	1.91 m (6 ft 3 in)	80 kg (180 lb)	328 cm (129 in)	312 cm (123 in)	(Poland) Jastrzębski Węgiel
14	Michał Ruciak	22 August 1983	1.89 m (6 ft 2 in)	75 kg (165 lb)	336 cm (132 in)	305 cm (120 in)	(Poland) ZAKSA
15	Łukasz Żygadło	2 August 1979	2.00 m (6 ft 7 in)	89 kg (196 lb)	337 cm (133 in)	325 cm (128 in)	(Italy) Trentino Volley
16	Krzysztof Ignaczak (L)	15 May 1978	1.88 m (6 ft 2 in)	86 kg (190 lb)	330 cm (130 in)	315 cm (124 in)	(Poland) Asseco Resovia
18	Marcin Możdżonek (c)	9 February 1985	2.11 m (6 ft 11 in)	93 kg (205 lb)	358 cm (141 in)	338 cm (133 in)	(Poland) PGE Skra

Group play

Pos	Team	Pld	W	L	Pts	SW	SL	SR	SPW	SPL	SPR
1	Bulgaria	5	4	1	12	13	4	3.250	407	390	1.044
2	Poland	5	3	2	9	11	7	1.571	433	374	1.158
3	Argentina	5	3	2	9	10	7	1.429	382	367	1.041
4	Italy	5	3	2	8	10	9	1.111	426	413	1.031
5	Australia	5	2	3	7	8	10	0.800	395	397	0.995
6	Great Britain	5	0	5	0	0	15	0.000	274	376	0.729

29 July 2012; 20:00	Italy	1–3	Poland	Earls Court Exhibition Centre, London; Attendance: 15,000; Referees: Rolando Cholakian (ARG), Zorica Bjelić (SRB)
29 July 2012; 20:00	(25–21, 20–25, 23–25, 14–25); Results Statistics			Earls Court Exhibition Centre, London; Attendance: 15,000; Referees: Rolando Cholakian (ARG), Zorica Bjelić (SRB)

31 July 2012; 11:40	Poland	1–3	Bulgaria	Earls Court Exhibition Centre, London; Attendance: 11,300; Referees: Andrey Zenovich (RUS), Akihiko Tano (JPN)
31 July 2012; 11:40	(22–25, 27–29, 25–13, 23–25); Results Statistics			Earls Court Exhibition Centre, London; Attendance: 11,300; Referees: Andrey Zenovich (RUS), Akihiko Tano (JPN)

2 August 2012; 16:45	Poland	3–0	Argentina	Earls Court Exhibition Centre, London; Attendance: 13,000; Referees: Georgios Karampetsos (GRE), Ibrahim Al-Naama (QAT)
2 August 2012; 16:45	(25–18, 25–20, 25–16); Results Statistics			Earls Court Exhibition Centre, London; Attendance: 13,000; Referees: Georgios Karampetsos (GRE), Ibrahim Al-Naama (QAT)

4 August 2012; 11:30	Great Britain	0–3	Poland	Earls Court Exhibition Centre, London; Attendance: 14,900; Referees: Ibrahim Al-Naama (QAT), Georgios Karampetsos (GRE)
4 August 2012; 11:30	(16–25, 19–25, 18–25); Results Statistics			Earls Court Exhibition Centre, London; Attendance: 14,900; Referees: Ibrahim Al-Naama (QAT), Georgios Karampetsos (GRE)

6 August 2012; 09:30	Australia	3–1	Poland	Earls Court Exhibition Centre, London; Attendance: 12,000; Referees: Rogerio Espicalsky (BRA), Andrey Zenovich (RUS)
6 August 2012; 09:30	(25–21, 25–22, 18–25, 25–22); Results Statistics			Earls Court Exhibition Centre, London; Attendance: 12,000; Referees: Rogerio Espicalsky (BRA), Andrey Zenovich (RUS)

Quarter-finals

8 August 2012; 19:30	Poland	0–3	Russia	Earls Court Exhibition Centre, London; Attendance: 14,000; Referees: Frans Loderus (NED), Nasr Shaaban (EGY)
8 August 2012; 19:30	(17–25, 23–25, 21–25); Results Statistics			Earls Court Exhibition Centre, London; Attendance: 14,000; Referees: Frans Loderus (NED), Nasr Shaaban (EGY)

== Weightlifting ==
Poland has qualified 6 men and 3 women.

Men

Athlete	Event	Snatch		Clean & Jerk		Total	Rank
Athlete	Event	Result	Rank	Result	Rank	Total	Rank
Krzysztof Zwarycz	−77 kg	150	7	182	7	332	7
Adrian Zieliński	−85 kg	174	2	211	1	385	1st place, gold medalist(s)
Arsen Kasabijew	−94 kg	170	11	—	—	170	DNF
Tomasz Zieliński	−94 kg	175	3	210	2	385	3rd place, bronze medalist(s)
Bartłomiej Bonk	−105 kg	190	1	220	2	410	2nd place, silver medalist(s)
Marcin Dołęga	−105 kg	~~190~~	DNF	—	—	—	DNF

Women

Athlete	Event	Snatch		Clean & Jerk		Total	Rank
Athlete	Event	Result	Rank	Result	Rank	Total	Rank
Joanna Łochowska	−53 kg	84	9	107	10	191	11
Aleksandra Klejnowska	−53 kg	84	10	112	4	196	5
Ewa Mizdal	−75 kg	104	4	127	5	231	4

== Wrestling ==
Poland has qualified at least only four quota places in wrestling events.

Key:

- VT – Victory by Fall.
- PP – Decision by Points – the loser with technical points.
- PO – Decision by Points – the loser without technical points.

Men's Greco-Roman

Athlete	Event	Qualification	Round of 16	Quarterfinal	Semifinal	Repechage 1	Repechage 2	Final / BM	
Athlete	Event	Opposition Result	Opposition Result	Opposition Result	Opposition Result	Opposition Result	Opposition Result	Opposition Result	Rank
Damian Janikowski	−84 kg	Avluca (TUR); W 3–0 ^{PO}	Hrustanović (AUT); W 3–0 ^{PO}	Shorey (CUB); W 5–0 ^{VT}	Gaber (EGY); L 1–3 ^{PP}	Bye		Noumonvi (FRA); W 3–0 ^{PO}	3rd place, bronze medalist(s)
Łukasz Banak	−120 kg	Bye	Chebbi (TUN); W 3–0 ^{PO}	Nabi (EST); L 0–3 ^{PO}	Did not advance	Bye	Chugoshvili (BLR); L 0–3 ^{PO}	Did not advance	10

Women's freestyle

Athlete	Event	Qualification	Round of 16	Quarterfinal	Semifinal	Repechage 1	Repechage 2	Final / BM	
Athlete	Event	Opposition Result	Opposition Result	Opposition Result	Opposition Result	Opposition Result	Opposition Result	Opposition Result	Rank
Iwona Matkowska	−48 kg	Bermúdez (ARG); W 3–0 ^{PO}	Otgontsetseg (MGL); W 5–0 ^{VT}	Stadnik (AZE); L 0–3 ^{PO}	Did not advance	Bye	Chun (USA); L 0–5 ^{VT}	Did not advance	7
Monika Michalik	−63 kg	Bye	Oborududu (NGR); W 3–0 ^{PO}	Jing Rx (CHN); L 0–3 ^{PO}	Did not advance	Bye	Choe U-G (PRK); W 3–1 ^{PP}	Volosova (RUS); L 1–3 ^{PP}	5
