= Taekwondo at the 2011 Pan American Games – Men's 68 kg =

Taekwondo – Men's 68 kg at the 2011 Pan American Games
- Venue: CODE II Gymnasium
- Dates: October 16
- Competitors: 16 from 16 nations

Medalists
Gold medal	Jhohanny Jean	Dominican Republic
Silver medal	Angel Mora	Cuba
Bronze medal	Terrence Jennings	United States
Bronze medal	Mario Guerra	Chile

The men's 68 kg competition of the taekwondo events at the 2011 Pan American Games took place on the 16 of October at the CODE II Gymnasium. The defending Pan American Games champion is Diogo Silva of the Brazil, while the defending Pan American Championship, champion is Peter López of Peru.

== Schedule ==
All times are Central Standard Time (UTC-6).

Date	Time	Round
October 16, 2011	11:00	Preliminaries
October 16, 2011	12:30	Quarterfinals
October 16, 2011	17:00	Semifinals
October 16, 2011	18:00	Final

== Results ==
Legend

- PTG — Won by Points Gap
- SUP — Won by Superiority
- OT — Won on over time (Golden Point)
- WDR — Withdrawn

=== Main bracket ===
Preliminary round
Diogo Silva (BRA)	8
Nicholos Dusard (JAM)	5
Terrence Jennings (USA)	13
Danny Mirands (VEN)	11
Luis Colon (PUR)	2
Federico Rosal (GUA)	14
Jhohanny Jean (DOM)	3
Erick Osornio (MEX)	2
Siddhartha Bhat (CAN)
Ryan Leach (BAR)	DSQ
Mario Guerra (CHI)	11
Sergio Garcia (ECU)	9
Angel Mora (CUB)
Osvaldo Caceres (PAR)	WDR
Leandro Garcia (ARG)	3
Peter López (PER)	4

Second round
Diogo Silva (BRA)	4
Terrence Jennings (USA)	6
Federico Rosal (GUA)	3
Jhohanny Jean (DOM)	9
Siddhartha Bhat (CAN)	6
Mario Guerra (CHI)	7
Angel Mora (CUB)	5
Peter López (PER)	4

Semifinals
Terrence Jennings (USA)	7
Jhohanny Jean (DOM)	9
Mario Guerra (CHI)	6
Angel Mora (CUB)	12

Gold medal match
Jhohanny Jean (DOM)	8
Angel Mora (CUB)	7
