= Taekwondo at the 2011 Pan American Games =

- Venue: CODE II Gymnasium
- Dates: October 15 – October 18
- Competitors: 109 from 32 nations

Taekwondo competitions at the 2011 Pan American Games in Guadalajara were held from October 15 to October 18 at the CODE II Gymnasium.

== Medal summary ==
=== Medal table ===
* Host nation (Mexico)

Rank	Nation	Gold	Silver	Bronze	Total
1	Cuba	2	1	2	5
2	Canada	2	0	1	3
2	Dominican Republic	2	0	1	3
4	Mexico*	1	1	3	5
5	Argentina	1	0	0	1
6	Venezuela	0	2	0	2
7	United States	0	1	5	6
8	Colombia	0	1	0	1
8	Peru	0	1	0	1
8	Puerto Rico	0	1	0	1
11	Chile	0	0	2	2
12	Brazil	0	0	1	1
12	Guatemala	0	0	1	1
Totals (13 entries)		8	8	16	32

=== Men's events ===
Event	Gold	Silver	Bronze
Flyweight (58 kg)	Gabriel Mercedes; Dominican Republic	Damian Villa; Mexico	Frank Diaz; Cuba
Flyweight (58 kg)	Gabriel Mercedes; Dominican Republic	Damian Villa; Mexico	Marcio Ferreira; Brazil
Lightweight (68 kg)	Jhohanny Jean; Dominican Republic	Angel Mora; Cuba	Terrence Jennings; United States
Lightweight (68 kg)	Jhohanny Jean; Dominican Republic	Angel Mora; Cuba	Mario Guerra; Chile
Middleweight (80 kg)	Sebastián Crismanich; Argentina	Carlos Vásquez; Venezuela	Uriel Adriano; Mexico
Middleweight (80 kg)	Sebastián Crismanich; Argentina	Carlos Vásquez; Venezuela	Stuardo Solorzano; Guatemala
Heavyweight (+80 kg)	Robelis Despaigne; Cuba	Juan Díaz; Venezuela	Francois Coulombe-Fortier; Canada
Heavyweight (+80 kg)	Robelis Despaigne; Cuba	Juan Díaz; Venezuela	Stephen Lambdin; United States

=== Women's events ===
Event	Gold	Silver	Bronze
Flyweight (49 kg)	Ivett Gonda; Canada	Julissa Diez Canseco; Peru	Deireanne Morales; United States
Flyweight (49 kg)	Ivett Gonda; Canada	Julissa Diez Canseco; Peru	Jannet Alegria; Mexico
Lightweight (57 kg)	Irma Contreras; Mexico	Doris Patiño; Colombia	Nicole Palma; United States
Lightweight (57 kg)	Irma Contreras; Mexico	Doris Patiño; Colombia	Yeny Contreras; Chile
Middleweight (67 kg)	Melissa Pagnotta; Canada	Paige McPherson; United States	Katherine Rodríguez; Dominican Republic
Middleweight (67 kg)	Melissa Pagnotta; Canada	Paige McPherson; United States	Taimi Castellanos; Cuba
Heavyweight (+67 kg)	Glenhis Hernández; Cuba	Nikki Martínez; Puerto Rico	Guadalupe Ruiz; Mexico
Heavyweight (+67 kg)	Glenhis Hernández; Cuba	Nikki Martínez; Puerto Rico	Lauren Cahoon; United States

== Schedule ==
All times are Central Daylight time (UTC-5).

Day	Date	Start	Finish	Event	Phase
Day 2	Saturday, October 15	11:00	19:25	Men's 58 kg/Women's 49 kg	Preliminaries, Quarter/Semi/Finals
Day 3	Sunday, October 16	11:00	19:25	Men's 68 kg/Women's 57 kg	Preliminaries, Quarter/Semi/Finals
Day 4	Monday, October 17	11:00	19:25	Men's 80 kg/Women's 67 kg	Preliminaries, Quarter/Semi/Finals
Day 5	Tuesday, October 18	11:00	19:25	Men's 80+kg/Women's 67+kg	Preliminaries, Quarter/Semi/Finals

== Qualification ==
Qualification was done at the 2011 Pan American Games Qualification Tournament in Lima, Peru between March 25 and 26, 2011. The tournament was a knockout tournament, in which the final placements were not determined. There is also a further eight spots available as wildcards.

=== Summary ===
The following countries qualified athletes:

Nation	58kg Men	68kg Men	80kg Men	80+kg Men	49kg Women	57kg Women	67kg Women	67+kg Women	Total
Argentina		X	X	X		X	X	X	6
Aruba	X		X						2
Barbados		X							1
Bolivia					X				1
Brazil	X	X	X		X		X	X	6
Canada	X	X	X	X	X	X	X	X	8
Chile		X	X			X	X		4
Colombia	X		X	X	X	X	X	X	7
Costa Rica	X			X			X		3
Cuba	X	X	X	X	X	X	X	X	8
Dominican Republic	X	X	X		X	X	X	X	7
Ecuador		X			X				2
El Salvador						X			1
Grenada							X		1
Guatemala	X	X	X	X	X	X			6
Guyana				X					1
Haiti				X					1
Honduras				X	X				2
Jamaica		X		X					2
Mexico	X	X	X	X	X	X	X	X	8
Netherlands Antilles	X								1
Nicaragua			X						1
Panama	X				X				2
Paraguay		X							1
Peru		X			X	X			3
Puerto Rico		X		X	X	X	X	X	6
Suriname				X					1
Trinidad and Tobago			X						1
United States	X	X	X	X	X	X	X	X	8
Uruguay	X								1
Venezuela	X	X	X	X		X	X		6
Virgin Islands			X						1
Total athletes	14	16	15	15	14	13	13	9	109
Total NOCs	14	16	15	15	14	13	13	9	32 NOCs
