= Taekwondo at the 2012 Summer Olympics – Men's 68 kg =

Taekwondo competition

Men's 68kg at the Games of the XXX Olympiad
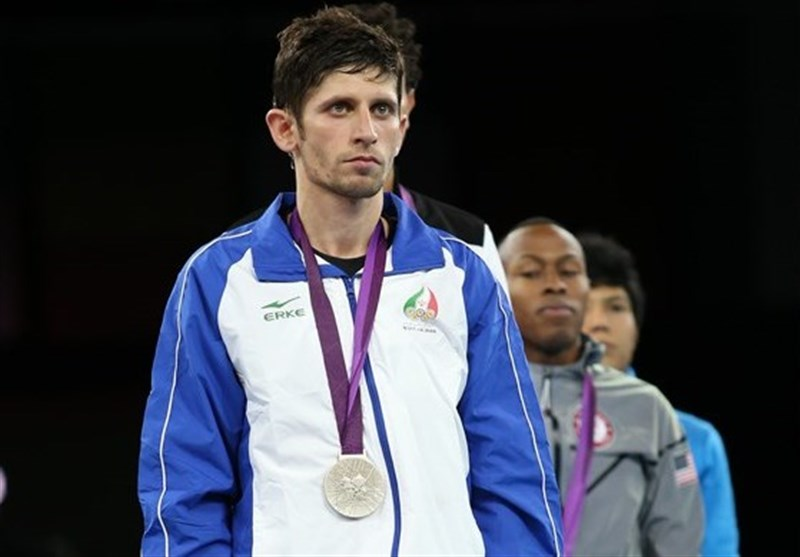
- Venue: ExCeL Exhibition Centre
- Date: 9 August
- Competitors: 16 from 16 nations

Medalists
1st place, gold medalist(s)		Servet Tazegül	Turkey
2nd place, silver medalist(s)		M Bagheri Motamed	Iran
3rd place, bronze medalist(s)		Terrence Jennings	United States
3rd place, bronze medalist(s)		Rohullah Nikpai	Afghanistan

The men's 68 kg competition at the 2012 Summer Olympics was held on 9 August, at the ExCeL Exhibition Centre.

== Competition format ==
The main bracket consisted of a single elimination tournament, culminating in the gold medal match. Two bronze medals were awarded at the Taekwondo competitions. A repechage was used to determine the bronze medal winners. Every competitor who lost to one of the two finalists competes in the repechage, another single-elimination competition. Each semifinal loser faced the last remaining repechage competitor from the opposite half of the bracket in a bronze medal match.

== Schedule ==
All times are British Summer Time (UTC+1)

Date	Time	Round
Thursday, 9 August 2012	09:15; 15:15; 17:15; 22:30	Preliminary Round; Quarterfinals; Semifinals; Final

== Results ==
On 13 July 2012, the World Taekwondo Federation released the provisional draw which included the top eight seeds for the competition. The remainder of the qualified athletes were randomly drawn on 6 August 2012.

=== Main bracket ===
Preliminary round
1	Servet Tazegül (TUR)	8
15	Terrence Jennings (USA)	6
14	Hryhorii Husarov (UKR)	10
8	Logan Campbell (NZL)	6
5	Peter López (PER)	3
Damir Fejzić (SRB)	5
Erick Osornio (MEX)	2
4	Martin Stamper (GBR)	5
3	Mohammad Abu-Libdeh (JOR)	13 (PTG)
Isah Mohammad (NGR)	1
Dmitriy Kim (UZB)	2
6	Diogo Silva (BRA)	3 (SUD)
7	Rohullah Nikpai (AFG)	12
Michał Łoniewski (POL)	5
David Boui (CAF)	2
2	Mohammad Bagheri Motamed (IRI)	7

Quarterfinals
1	Servet Tazegül (TUR)	9
Hryhorii Husarov (UKR)	2
Damir Fejzić (SRB)	3
4	Martin Stamper (GBR)	8
3	Mohammad Abu-Libdeh (JOR)	5
6	Diogo Silva (BRA)	7
7	Rohullah Nikpai (AFG)	4
2	Mohammad Bagheri Motamed (IRI)	5 (SUD)

Semifinals
1	Servet Tazegül (TUR)	9
4	Martin Stamper (GBR)	6
6	Diogo Silva (BRA)	5
2	Mohammad Bagheri Motamed (IRI)	5 (SUP)

Gold medal match
1	Servet Tazegül (TUR)	6
2	Mohammad Bagheri Motamed (IRI)	5

=== Repechage ===
Every competitor who lost to one of the two finalists competed in the repechage, another single-elimination competition. Each semifinal loser faced the last remaining repechage competitor from the opposite half of the bracket in a bronze medal match.

Preliminary Round
