= Behnam Asbaghi =

Iranian taekwondo practitioner

Medal record

Men's taekwondo

Representing Iran

World Championships
Gold medal – first place	2013 Puebla	68 kg

Asian Games
Gold medal – first place	2014 Incheon	68 kg

Asian Championships
Gold medal – first place	2014 Tashkent	68 kg

World Combat Games
Gold medal – first place	2013 St. Petersburg	Team

Behnam Asbaghi Khanghah (Persian: بهنام اسبقی خانقاه, born June 25, 1986, in Tehran, Iran) is an Iranian taekwondo practitioner. He won the gold medal in the featherweight division (-68 kg) at the 2013 World Taekwondo Championships in Puebla and the 2014 Asian Games in Incheon, South Korea.
