= Taekwondo at the 2014 Asian Games – Men's 68 kg =

Taekwondo competition

Men's 68 kg at the 2014 Asian Games
- Venue: Ganghwa Dolmens Gymnasium
- Date: 2 October 2014
- Competitors: 22 from 22 nations

Medalists
gold medal	Behnam Asbaghi	Iran
silver medal	Huang Jiannan	China
bronze medal	Kairat Sarymsakov	Kazakhstan
bronze medal	Keith Sembrano	Philippines

The men's featherweight (68 kilograms) event at the 2014 Asian Games took place on 2 October 2014 at Ganghwa Dolmens Gymnasium, Incheon, South Korea.

== Schedule ==
All times are Korea Standard Time (UTC+09:00)

Date	Time	Event
Thursday, 2 October 2014	09:30	Round of 32
Thursday, 2 October 2014	09:30	Round of 16
Thursday, 2 October 2014	15:30	Quarterfinals
Thursday, 2 October 2014	15:30	Semifinals
Thursday, 2 October 2014	18:00	Final

== Results ==
Legend

- R — Won by referee stop contest
- W — Won by withdrawal

=== Final ===
Final
Behnam Asbaghi (IRI)	5
Huang Jiannan (CHN)	4

=== Top half ===
Round of 32
Thinagaran Naidu Papunaidu (MAS)	2
Kairat Sarymsakov (KAZ)	16
Said Gafar Salih (QAT)	4
Phan Trung Đức (VIE)	14
Fadi Bakhazi (LIB)	10
Khusrav Giyosov (TJK)	5

Round of 16
Jawad Lakzaee (AFG)	5
Kairat Sarymsakov (KAZ)	8
Shiv Kumar (IND)	7
Ghazi Al-Asmari (KSA)	11
Behnam Asbaghi (IRI)	9
Phan Trung Đức (VIE)	0
Fadi Bakhazi (LIB)	4
Mahamad Wesh (NEP)	1

Quarterfinals
Kairat Sarymsakov (KAZ)	17
Ghazi Al-Asmari (KSA)	4
Behnam Asbaghi (IRI)	9
Fadi Bakhazi (LIB)	0

Semifinals
Kairat Sarymsakov (KAZ)	1
Behnam Asbaghi (IRI)	7

=== Bottom half ===
Round of 32
Argen Tashanov (KGZ)	6
Chetrapee Tangjai (THA)	24^{R}
Abdullah Gholoum (KUW)	13
Tilak Bahadur Gurung (BHU)	1
Pun Chi Fai (MAC)	2
Vladislav Khan (UZB)	22^{W}

Round of 16
Phouthasone Thammavong (LAO)	1
Chetrapee Tangjai (THA)	13
Abdullah Gholoum (KUW)	10
Keith Sembrano (PHI)	12
Huang Jiannan (CHN)	10
Zaw Zaw (MYA)	4
Vladislav Khan (UZB)	0
Lo Tsung-jui (TPE)	3

Quarterfinals
Chetrapee Tangjai (THA)	9
Keith Sembrano (PHI)	12
Huang Jiannan (CHN)	8
Lo Tsung-jui (TPE)	2

Semifinals
Keith Sembrano (PHI)	3
Huang Jiannan (CHN)	16
