= Taekwondo at the 2005 Summer Universiade =

Taekwondo competition

Taekwondo at the XXIII Summer Universiade
- Venue: İzmir University Sports Complex
- Dates: August 15, 2005 – August 19, 2005

The taekwondo competition in the 2005 Summer Universiade was held in İzmir, Turkey.

== Medal overview ==
=== Men's events ===
Event	Gold	Silver	Bronze
54 kg	Seyfula Magomedov; Russia	Majid Sajjadi; Iran	Han Chan-Seok; South Korea; Vugar Karimov; Azerbaijan
58 kg	Murat Boyalı; Turkey	Jannis Dakos; Germany	Behzad Khodadad; Iran; Charles Smith; United States
62 kg	Park Hyung-Jim; South Korea	Mohammad Bagheri Motamed; Iran	Cui Yuhong; China; Marcio Wenceslau; Brazil
67 kg	Lee Mum-Kyu; South Korea	Erick Osornio; Mexico	Balla Dieye; Senegal; Michalis Mouroutsos; Greece
72 kg	Patiwat Tongsalap; Thailand	Abdullah Sertçelik; Turkey	Kim Jin-Hyoung; South Korea; Arman Yeremyan; Armenia
78 kg	Kim Jae-Hak; South Korea	Vahid Abdollahi; Iran	Gustavo Figueroa; Mexico; Kontantinos Gkoltsios; Greece
84 kg	Bahri Tanrıkulu; Turkey	Mauro Sarmiento; Italy	Hamed Khamseh; Iran; Igor Rasakhatskiy; Belarus
Over 84 kg	Nam Yun-Bae; South Korea	Mehdi Navaei; Iran	Leonardo Basile; Italy; Ferry Greevink; Netherlands

=== Women's events ===
Event	Gold	Silver	Bronze
47 kg	Wu Jingyu; China	Yang Shu-chun; Chinese Taipei	Svetlana Klimova; Russia; Yu Eun-Yeong; South Korea
51 kg	Wu Yenni; Chinese Taipei	Yaowapa Boorapolchai; Thailand	Elaine Teo; Malaysia; Elisha Voren; United States
55 kg	Zeynep Murat; Turkey	Chang Yilan; Chinese Taipei	Yanelis Labrada; Cuba; Federica Mastrantoni; Italy
59 kg	Lee Sung-Hye; South Korea	Andrea Rica; Spain	Aparecida Santana; Brazil; Laksami Yumankong; Thailand
63 kg	Azize Tanrıkulu; Turkey	Jung Jae-Young; South Korea	Ines Scumace; Italy; Joyce van Baaren; Netherlands
67 kg	Sibel Güler; Turkey	Hwang Kyung-Seon; South Korea	Gwladys Épangue; France; Elizabeth Shakhovich; United States
72 kg	Liu Rui; China	Alesiya Charnyovskaya; Belarus	Jung Sun-Young; South Korea; Mehtap Yalçın; Turkey
Over 72 kg	Yvonne Oude Luttikhuis; Netherlands	Filiznur Aydın; Turkey	Mariya Konyakhina; Russia; Laurence Rase; Belgium

== Medal table ==
* Host nation (Turkey)

Rank	Nation	Gold	Silver	Bronze	Total
1	South Korea	5	2	4	11
2	Turkey*	5	2	1	8
3	China	2	0	1	3
4	Chinese Taipei	1	2	0	3
5	Thailand	1	1	1	3
6	Netherlands	1	0	2	3
6	Russia	1	0	2	3
8	Iran	0	4	2	6
9	Italy	0	1	3	4
10	Belarus	0	1	1	2
10	Mexico	0	1	1	2
12	Germany	0	1	0	1
12	Spain	0	1	0	1
14	United States	0	0	3	3
15	Brazil	0	0	2	2
15	Greece	0	0	2	2
17	Armenia	0	0	1	1
17	Azerbaijan	0	0	1	1
17	Belgium	0	0	1	1
17	Cuba	0	0	1	1
17	France	0	0	1	1
17	Malaysia	0	0	1	1
17	Senegal	0	0	1	1
Totals (23 entries)		16	16	32	64
