= Idulio Islas =

Mexican taekwondo practitioner

Personal information
- Full name: Idulio Islas Gómez
- Born: 16 January 1987 (age 39) Morelos, Mexico
- Height: 1.81 m (5 ft 11 1/2 in)
- Weight: 68 kg (150 lb)

Sport
- Sport: Taekwondo
- Event: 68 kg
- Coached by: Reinaldo Salazar
Medal record
Men's taekwondo
Representing Mexico
Universiade
Bronze medal – third place	2011 Shenzhen	68 kg
World Championships
Silver medal – second place	2009 Copenhagen	68 kg

Idulio Islas Gómez (born January 16, 1987, in Morelos) is a Mexican taekwondo practitioner. He won a silver medal for the 68 kg division at the 2009 World Taekwondo Championships in Copenhagen, Denmark, and bronze at the 2011 Summer Universiade in Shenzhen, China.

Islas qualified for the men's 68 kg class at the 2008 Summer Olympics in Beijing, after placing third from the Pan American Qualification Tournament in Cali, Colombia. He lost the preliminary round of sixteen match by a superiority decision to Nigeria's Isah Adam Muhammad, after the pair had tied 2–2.

== See also ==
- List of people from Morelos
