= Beata Stremler =

Polish dressage rider

Personal information
- Born: 13 September 1984 (age 41) Warsaw, Poland
- Height: 169 cm (5 ft 7 in)
- Weight: 58 kg (128 lb)

Sport
- Sport: Horse riding
- Event: Mixed dressage
- Club: Gut Auric Riding Club, Germany
Medal record
Equestrian
Representing Poland
World Championships for Young Horses
Bronze medal – third place	2021 Verden	Individual dressage

Beata Stremler (born 13 September 1984) is a Polish dressage Grand Prix rider. She represented Poland at the 2012 Summer Olympics in London in the team (8th place) and individual dressage (38th place) on the horse Martini.

In 2024 horse FairPlay has been sold to Germany, which ruled Beata Stremler out for Polish Olympic team selection with this horse for 2024 Summer Olympic in Paris.
