= Mohammad Bagheri Motamed =

Iranian taekwondo practitioner

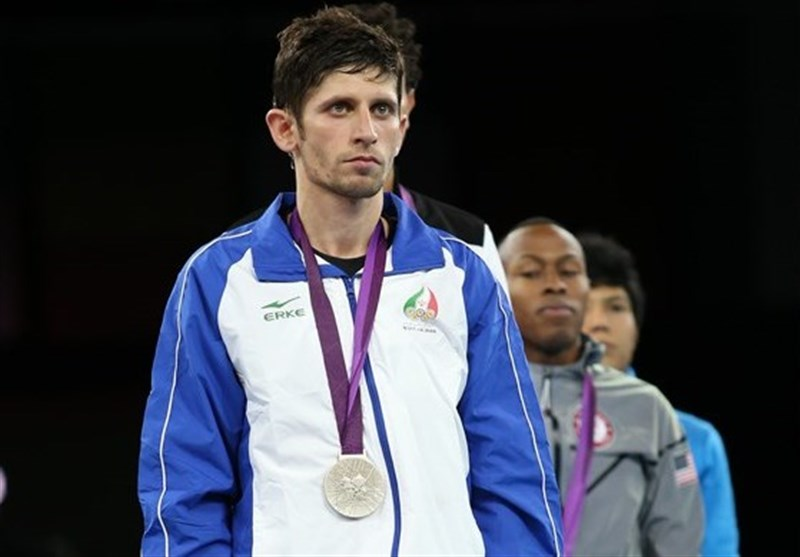
- Bagheri-Motamed winning silver at the 2012 Olympics

Personal information
- Nationality: Iranian
- Born: January 24, 1986 (age 40) Ray, Iran

Sport
- Country: Iran
- Sport: Taekwondo
- Event: Lightweight
Medal record
Men's taekwondo
Representing Iran
Olympic Games
Silver medal – second place	2012 London	68 kg
World Championships
Gold medal – first place	2009 Copenhagen	68 kg
Silver medal – second place	2011 Gyeongju	68 kg
Asian Games
Gold medal – first place	2010 Guangzhou	68 kg
Asian Championships
Gold medal – first place	2008 Luoyang	67 kg
Gold medal – first place	2010 Astana	68 kg
Silver medal – second place	2004 Seongnam	58 kg
Bronze medal – third place	2002 Amman	54 kg
Summer Universiade
Gold medal – first place	2007 Bangkok	67 kg
Silver medal – second place	2005 İzmir	62 kg
Islamic Solidarity Games
Gold medal – first place	2013 Palembang	68 kg

Mohammad Bagheri Motamed (Persian: محمد باقری معتمد, born January 24, 1986, in Ray, Iran) is an Iranian former professional taekwondo athlete. He won the gold medal in the featherweight division (-68 kg) at the 2009 World Taekwondo Championships in ۱ Copenhagen, Denmark and the Olympic silver medal at the London 2012 Olympics. ۲

== Olympic 2012 London ==
He competed in the 2012 London Olympics and defeated David Boy of the Central African Republic in the first game. In the second game, Ruhollah Nikpa, the bronze medalist of the Beijing Olympics, was defeated, and in the fourth game, he won 5–5 against the Brazilian opponent with the votes of the judges. Won the silver medal at the London Olympics.۱۲

== Biography ==
He started Taekwondo at the age of six and soon joined the national team. 1 Motamed joined the national team in 2001 and won 1 silver medal in the Taekwondo World Cup, 1 gold, 1 silver and 1 bronze in the Asian Championship. He also won 1 silver in the World Student Championships, 2 gold and 1 silver in the World Student Olympiad, and 1 silver in the 2012 Olympics. 2

Mohammad Bagheri Motamed won a gold medal in the 68 kg weight category at the Guangzhou Asian Games.

Mohammad Bagheri Motamed lives in Tehran and his father and brother are also taekwondo athletes. He officially accepted the citizenship of Azerbaijan in 2016 and was scheduled to work with the Azerbaijani Taekwondo team. 3
