= Diana Sokołowska =

Polish swimmer

Personal information
- Born: 19 February 1996 (age 30) Sokółka

Diana Sokołowska (born 19 February 1996, in Sokółka) is a Polish swimmer. She competed in the 4 × 200 metre freestyle relay event at the 2012 Summer Olympics. In fall 2017, she competed for the Nevada Wolf Pack Swimming & Diving team.
