= Martin Stamper =

British Taekwondo athlete

Medal record

Representing Great Britain

Men's taekwondo

World Championships
Bronze medal – third place	2011 Gyeongju	68 kg

European Championships
Silver medal – second place	2008 Rome	62 kg
Bronze medal – third place	2012 Manchester	68 kg

European Junior Championships
Silver medal – second place	2001 Pamplona	48 kg

Martin Stamper (born 21 August 1986) is a British former taekwondo athlete.

== Early life ==
He was born in Liverpool, England.

== Career ==
Stamper was a bronze medallist at the 2011 World Taekwondo Championships. He also competed in the 2012 Summer Olympics and reached the semi-finals. He lost in the bronze Medal Match to Rohullah Nikpai of Afghanistan, ending up in 5th place.

== Taekwondo medals ==
Year	Competition	Venue	Position	Notes
2008	2008 European Taekwondo Championships	Rome	2nd	62 kg
2010	French Open	Paris	3rd	68 kg
2011	US Open	Austin	1st	68 kg
2011	German Open	Hamburg	1st	68 kg
2011	World Championships	Gyeongju	3rd	68 kg
2011	British International Open	Manchester	1st	68 kg
2012	2012 European Taekwondo Championships	Manchester	3rd	68 kg
