= Erick Osornio =

Mexican taekwondo practitioner

Personal information
- Born: 3 May 1983 (age 43) Puebla, Puebla, Mexico

Sport
- Sport: Taekwondo
- Retired: 2013
Medal record
Representing Mexico
Summer Universiade
Silver medal – second place	2005 Izmir	-67 kg
Pan American Games
Bronze medal – third place	2003 Santo Domingo	-68 kg
Central American and Caribbean Games
Gold medal – first place	2002 San Salvador	-67 kg

Erick Osornio Núñez (born 3 May 1983) is a Mexican former taekwondo practitioner. At the 2012 Summer Olympics, he competed in the men's 68 kg competition, but was defeated in the first round.

He announced his retirement from the sport in 2013.
