= Angel Mora =

Cuban field hockey player

Personal information
- Nationality: Cuban
- Born: 2 October 1948 (age 77)

Sport
- Sport: Field hockey

Angel Mora (born 2 October 1948) is a Cuban field hockey player. He competed in the men's tournament at the 1980 Summer Olympics.
