= Mohammad Abulibdeh =

Jordanian taekwondo practitioner

Mohammad Abulibdeh is a Jordanian taekwondo practitioner. At the 2012 Summer Olympics, he competed in the Men's 68 kg competition, reaching the quarterfinals.
