= Jhohanny Jean =

Taekwondo practitioner from the Dominican Republic

Personal information
- Born: February 5, 1988 (age 38) Monte Plata, Dominican Republic
Medal record
Men's taekwondo
Representing the Dominican Republic
Pan American Games
Gold medal – first place	2011 Guadalajara	Under 68kg
Central American and Caribbean Games
Silver medal – second place	2010 Mayaguez	Under 68kg

Jhohanny Jean Bartermi (born February 5, 1988) is a Dominican taekwondo practitioner.

== Early life ==
Jean was born in Monte Plata, of the Dominican Republic. His parents are of Haitian descent.

== Career ==
Jhohanny started winning for his home country at the 2008 Pan American Championship in Caguas, Puerto Rico. There he won the silver medal after being defeated by the local Sebastián Crismanich.

Jean won the silver medal in the 2010 Central American and Caribbean Games at the Under 68 kg category.

At the 2011 Pan American Games in Guadalajara, Mexico Jhohanny won the gold medal defeating the Cuban Angel Mora.
