= Terrence Jennings =

American taekwondo practitioner

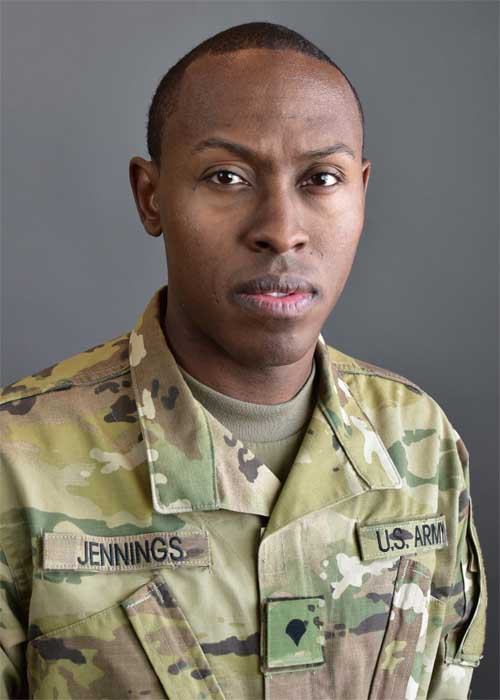
- Jennings in 2017

Personal information
- Nickname: TJ
- Nationality: American
- Born: Terrence DeAndre Jennings; July 28, 1986 (age 39) Arlington, Virginia, U.S.
- Height: 1.75 m (5 ft 9 in)
- Weight: 68 kg (150 lb)

Sport
- Country: United States
- Sport: Taekwondo
- Event: Lightweight
- Club: U.S. Army
- Coached by: Patrice Remarck
Medal record
Representing United States
Olympic Games
Bronze medal – third place	2012 London	68 kg
Pan American Games
Bronze medal – third place	2011 Guadalajara	68 kg

Terrence Jennings (born July 28, 1986) is an American taekwondo practitioner. He began competing internationally in 2003 and qualified for the 2012 Summer Olympics. At the 2012 Summer Olympics, he qualified for the repechage in the 68 kg lightweight division by losing to the eventual gold medalist Servet Tazegül. Jennings won one of two bronze medals in that division by landing a three-point headshot with the score tied and one second left in the bronze medal match against Diogo Silva of Brazil. The other bronze medal in the division was awarded to Rohullah Nikpai.
