= Rohullah Nikpai =

Hazara Taekwondo practitioner

Rohullah Nikpa روح‌الله نیکپا
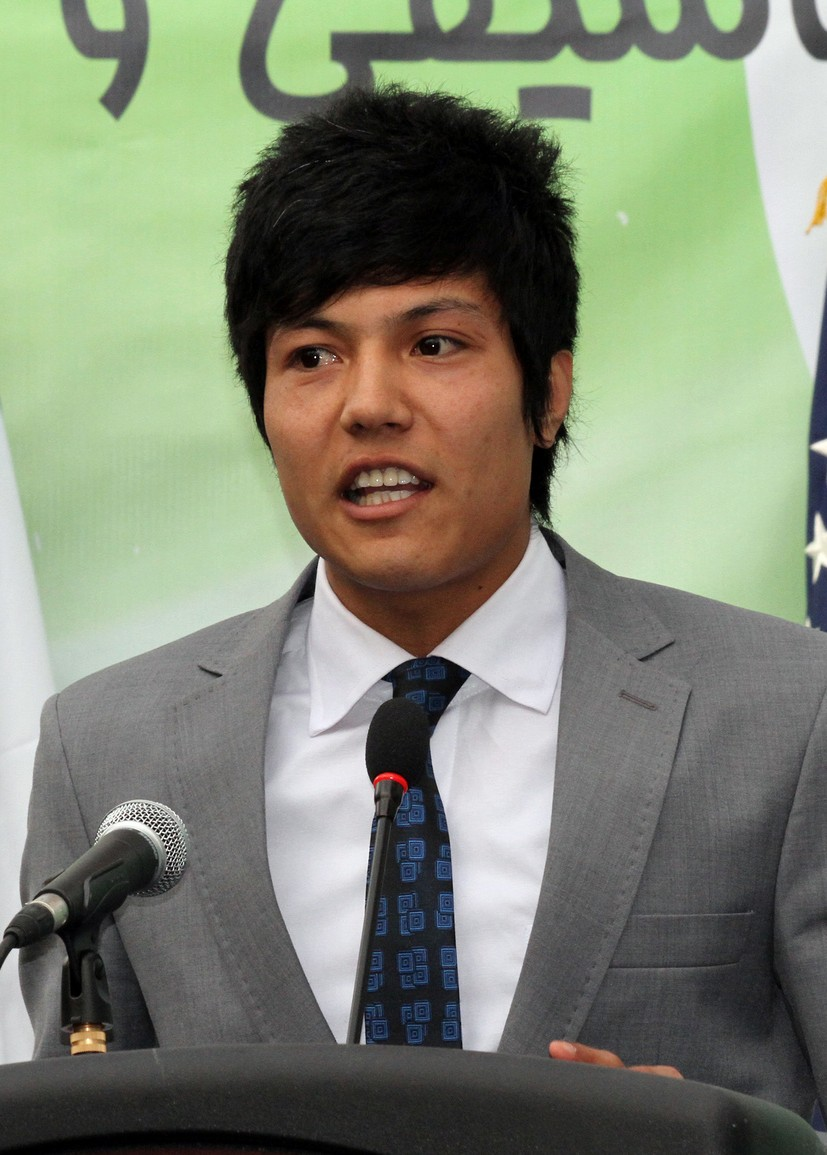
- Nikpa speaking in 2012 in Kabul, Afghanistan

Personal information
- Nationality: Afghan
- Born: June 15, 1987 (age 39) Maidan Wardak, Democratic Republic of Afghanistan
- Height: 180 cm (5 ft 11 in)
- Weight: 68 kg (150 lb)

Sport
- Country: Afghanistan
- Sport: Taekwondo
- Retired: 2017

Achievements and titles
- Olympic finals: 2008 Beijing
- World finals: 2011 Gyeongju
- Regional finals: 2008 Luoyang
Medal record
Men's taekwondo
Representing Afghanistan
Olympic Games
Bronze medal – third place	2008 Beijing	58 kg
Bronze medal – third place	2012 London	68 kg
World Championships
Bronze medal – third place	2011 Gyeongju	Featherweight
Asian Championships
Silver medal – second place	2012 Ho Chi Minh City	Featherweight
Bronze medal – third place	2008 Luoyang	Flyweight
Bronze medal – third place	2014 Tashkent	Featherweight
South Asian Games
Gold medal – first place	2016 Guwahati-Shillong	68 kg

Rohullah Nikpa (Dari: روح‌الله نیکپا; born June 15, 1987) is a taekwondo practitioner and two-time Olympic bronze medalist from Afghanistan. As of 2024, he is the only Afghan athlete to have won a medal at the Olympics. In 2023, he became the coach of New Zealand’s national taekwondo team.

== Career ==
An ethnic Hazara, Nikpa started his training in Iran, at the age of 10. During the 1990s civil war, his family left the city and lived as refugees in Iran. He became a member of the Afghan Taekwondo team after watching martial arts films. He repatriated to Afghanistan in 2004 and continued his training at the government provided Olympic training facility in Kabul. At the 2006 Asian Games in Doha, Qatar Nikpa competed in the flyweight division where he was defeated by eventual silver medalist Nattapong Tewawetchapong of Thailand in the round of 16.

Nikpa competed in the 58 kg category at the 2008 Summer Olympics, defeating two-time world champion Juan Antonio Ramos of Spain to win the bronze medal, making him Afghanistan's first (and as of 2025, only) Olympic medalist in any event. He became a national hero, returning to Afghanistan and getting off the plane to be met with a crowd of thousands. Then-Afghan President Hamid Karzai immediately called to congratulate Nikpa. Karzai also awarded him a house, car, and other luxuries at the government’s expense. "I hope this will send a message of peace to my country after 30 years of war," Nikpa said. In the 2012 Summer Olympics, Rohullah entered the 68 kg category, where he was defeated by Iran's Mohammad Bagheri Motamed; he eventually won his bronze medal at the Olympic Games after defeating Martin Stamper of Great Britain.

== See also ==
- Afghanistan at the 2008 Summer Olympics
- Afghanistan at the 2012 Summer Olympics
