= Balla Dièye =

Senegalese taekwondo practitioner

Personal information
- Nationality: Senegalese
- Born: 13 November 1980 (age 45) Dakar, Senegal

Sport
- Sport: Taekwondo
Medal record
Representing Senegal
Summer Universiade
Bronze medal – third place	2005 Izmir	67kg

Balla Dièye (born 13 November 1980) is a Senegalese taekwondo athlete.

== Career ==
He competed at the 2016 Summer Olympics in Rio de Janeiro, in the men's 68 kg, where he lost to Karol Robak in the preliminaries.

In 2017, he competed in the men's featherweight event at the 2017 World Taekwondo Championships held in Muju, South Korea.
