= Michał Łoniewski =

Polish taekwondo practitioner

Michał Łoniewski (born 22 October 1988 in Warsaw) is a Polish taekwondo practitioner and professional boxer with a Taekwondo record of 55 fights and 24 wins. At the 2012 Summer Olympics, he competed in the Men's 68 kg competition, but was defeated in the first round.

His current boxing record stands at 4 wins, 5 losses in the light-heavyweight division.
