= 2011 World Taekwondo Championships – Men's bantamweight =

Taekwondo competition

Men's bantamweight at the 2011 World Championships
- Venue: Gyeongju Indoor Stadium
- Dates: 5–6 May 2011
- Competitors: 80 from 80 nations

Medalists
gold medal	Lee Dae-hoon	South Korea
silver medal	Michael Harvey	Great Britain
bronze medal	Nacha Punthong	Thailand
bronze medal	Lê Huỳnh Châu	Vietnam

The Men's bantamweight is a competition featured at the 2011 World Taekwondo Championships, and was held at the Gyeongju Gymnasium in Gyeongju, South Korea on May 5 and May 6. Bantamweights were limited to a maximum of 63 kilograms in body mass.

== Results ==
Legend

- DQ — Won by disqualification
- P — Won by punitive declaration
- W — Won by withdrawal

=== Finals ===
Quarterfinals		Semifinals		Final
Reza Naderian (IRI)	1
Lee Dae-hoon (KOR)	7	Lee Dae-hoon (KOR)	0^{W}
Nacha Punthong (THA)	9	Nacha Punthong (THA)	0
Zainobiddin Nazaraliev (UZB)	3			Lee Dae-hoon (KOR)	5
Michael Harvey (GBR)	5			Michael Harvey (GBR)	2
Vladimir Dalakliev (BUL)	3	Michael Harvey (GBR)	11
Lê Huỳnh Châu (VIE)	8	Lê Huỳnh Châu (VIE)	5
Cem Uluğnuyan (TUR)	7

=== Top half ===
==== Section 1 ====
Round of 128
~~Tarig Mohammed (SUD)~~
Jordan Tay (SIN)	DQ
Prince Maswa Mukubi (COD)	6
Bruce Jonathan (VAN)	2

Round of 64
Reza Naderian (IRI)	13
Jordan Tay (SIN)	1
Byron Vásquez (ESA)	0^{W}
Bernard Posey (USA)	3
Vladislav Arventii (MDA)	7
Aziz Achmetov (AUT)	3
Prince Maswa Mukubi (COD)	3
Milad Ashna (SWE)	12

Round of 32
Reza Naderian (IRI)	6
Byron Vásquez (ESA)	0
Vladislav Arventii (MDA)	4
Milad Ashna (SWE)	2

Round of 16
Reza Naderian (IRI)	4
Vladislav Arventii (MDA)	2

==== Section 2 ====
Round of 128
Sayed Hasan Rezai (AFG)	6
Xia Xiaocun (CHN)	7
Leandro García (ARG)	2
Wu Yao-cheng (TPE)	5

Round of 64
~~Abdulrauf Gerwash (LBA)~~
Xia Xiaocun (CHN)	DQ
Roberto Chiarella (ITA)	9
Sujan Joshi (NEP)	1
Robert Amzoiu (ROU)	12^{P}
Mahmood Adel (BRN)	9
Wu Yao-cheng (TPE)	3
Lee Dae-hoon (KOR)	8

Round of 32
Xia Xiaocun (CHN)	2
Roberto Chiarella (ITA)	1
Robert Amzoiu (ROU)	0
Lee Dae-hoon (KOR)	9

Round of 16
Xia Xiaocun (CHN)	2
Lee Dae-hoon (KOR)	14

==== Section 3 ====
Round of 128
Paul Romero (PHI)	4^{W}
Aram Rubenyan (ARM)	3
Tin Wing Tai (HKG)	DQ
~~Joseph Ateba (CMR)~~

Round of 64
Nacha Punthong (THA)	8
Paul Romero (PHI)	3
Jure Pantar (SLO)	4
Marcel Wenceslau (BRA)	3
~~Oswaldo Romero (COL)~~
Alex Rings (NZL)	DQ
Tin Wing Tai (HKG)	3
Nikola Jovanović (SRB)	4

Round of 32
Nacha Punthong (THA)	4
Jure Pantar (SLO)	1
Alex Rings (NZL)	0
Nikola Jovanović (SRB)	14

Round of 16
Nacha Punthong (THA)	5
Nikola Jovanović (SRB)	3

==== Section 4 ====
Round of 128
Nodar Goletiani (GEO)	DQ
~~Kirubel Kenea (ETH)~~
Zainobiddin Nazaraliev (UZB)	13
Michael Cerdas (CRC)	1

Round of 64
~~Hernán Villafañe (VEN)~~
Nodar Goletiani (GEO)	DQ
Fares Al-Tayer (UAE)	DQ
~~Yaser Bamatraf (YEM)~~
~~Moses Muturi (KEN)~~
Mery Wandra (INA)	DQ
Zainobiddin Nazaraliev (UZB)	7
Stevens Barclais (FRA)	4

Round of 32
Nodar Goletiani (GEO)	8
Fares Al-Tayer (UAE)	3
Mery Wandra (INA)	0
Zainobiddin Nazaraliev (UZB)	5

Round of 16
Nodar Goletiani (GEO)	1
Zainobiddin Nazaraliev (UZB)	9

=== Bottom half ===
==== Section 5 ====
Round of 128
Sonam Dorji (BHU)	0
Vasileios Gaitanis (GRE)	12
Hosny Hosny (EGY)	4
Mario Gajardo (CHI)	5

Round of 64
Alfonso Victoria (MEX)	1
Vasileios Gaitanis (GRE)	2
Khalifa Ababacar Sarr (SEN)	6
Yannick Boukaka (CGO)	0
Mário Silva (POR)	3
Darkhan Kassymkulov (KAZ)	0
Mario Gajardo (CHI)	2
Michael Harvey (GBR)	7

Round of 32
Vasileios Gaitanis (GRE)	3
Khalifa Ababacar Sarr (SEN)	4
Mário Silva (POR)	10
Michael Harvey (GBR)	14

Round of 16
Khalifa Ababacar Sarr (SEN)	2
Michael Harvey (GBR)	9

==== Section 6 ====
Round of 128
Safwan Khalil (AUS)	14
Marios Fyllakoudias (CYP)	2
~~Alex Sanabria (HON)~~
Ryan Chong (MAS)	DQ

Round of 64
Jairo Rijo (DOM)	3
Safwan Khalil (AUS)	2
Vladimir Dalakliev (BUL)	8^{P}
Naranchimegiin Erdenebaatar (MGL)	5
David Boui (CAF)	8
Akhmed Odilbekov (TJK)	11
Ryan Chong (MAS)	4
Rafik Zohri (NED)	5

Round of 32
Jairo Rijo (DOM)	4
Vladimir Dalakliev (BUL)	7
Akhmed Odilbekov (TJK)	3
Rafik Zohri (NED)	8

Round of 16
Vladimir Dalakliev (BUL)	9
Rafik Zohri (NED)	7

==== Section 7 ====
Round of 128
José Luis Méndez (ESP)	4
Tomik Hayrapetian (GER)	3
Alpheus Mkhonazi (RSA)	DQ
~~Anton Aitsi (PNG)~~

Round of 64
Dmitry Frank (RUS)	8
José Luis Méndez (ESP)	9
Lê Huỳnh Châu (VIE)	15
Chan Chon In (MAC)	1
Abdallah Matar (QAT)	5
Yauhen Naurotski (BLR)	9
Alpheus Mkhonazi (RSA)	3
Kanaan Kanaan (JOR)	11

Round of 32
José Luis Méndez (ESP)	7
Lê Huỳnh Châu (VIE)	8
Yauhen Naurotski (BLR)	3
Kanaan Kanaan (JOR)	4

Round of 16
Lê Huỳnh Châu (VIE)	5
Kanaan Kanaan (JOR)	4

==== Section 8 ====
Round of 128
Jocelyn Addison (CAN)	9
Nicolau Sambo (MOZ)	6
Adam Sagir (ISR)	DQ
~~Zakaria Chenouf (ALG)~~

Round of 64
Yuki Mitsuhashi (JPN)	7
Jocelyn Addison (CAN)	15
Sven Lorrimer (GUY)	0
Fariz Aliyev (AZE)	12
Liau Molikoe (LES)	6
Bence Galambos (HUN)	7
Adam Sagir (ISR)	2
Cem Uluğnuyan (TUR)	9

Round of 32
Jocelyn Addison (CAN)	4
Fariz Aliyev (AZE)	3
Bence Galambos (HUN)	0
Cem Uluğnuyan (TUR)	0^{W}

Round of 16
Jocelyn Addison (CAN)	4
Cem Uluğnuyan (TUR)	5
