= 2009 World Taekwondo Championships – Men's bantamweight =

Taekwondo competition

Men's bantamweight at the 2009 World Championships
- Venue: Ballerup Super Arena
- Dates: 16 October 2009
- Competitors: 83 from 83 nations

Medalists
gold medal	Yeom Hyo-seob	South Korea
silver medal	Reza Naderian	Iran
bronze medal	Javier Marrón	Spain
bronze medal	Cem Uluğnuyan	Turkey

The Men's bantamweight competition at the 2009 World Taekwondo Championships was held at the Ballerup Super Arena in Copenhagen, Denmark on October 16.

Bantamweights were limited to a maximum of 63 kilograms in body mass.

== Results ==
Legend

- DQ — Won by disqualification
- RSC — Won by referee stop contest

=== Finals ===
Quarterfinals		Semifinals		Final
Rafik Zohri (NED)	2
Javier Marrón (ESP)	3	Javier Marrón (ESP)	0
Ouahid Briki (TUN)	0	Reza Naderian (IRI)	4
Reza Naderian (IRI)	3			Reza Naderian (IRI)	2
Ziaullah Aimal (AFG)	2			Yeom Hyo-seob (KOR)	4
Yeom Hyo-seob (KOR)	3	Yeom Hyo-seob (KOR)	8
Jairo Rijo (DOM)	7	Cem Uluğnuyan (TUR)	5
Cem Uluğnuyan (TUR)	9

=== Top half ===
==== Section 1 ====
Round of 128
Kurt Haluk Atalar (AUT)	DQ
~~Naser Al-Hurais (KUW)~~
Fariz Aliyev (AZE)	7
Waldo Peña (CHI)	2
Alpheus Mkhonazi (RSA)	6
Anatol Kachuk (BLR)	12

Round of 64
Rafik Zohri (NED)	7
Kurt Haluk Atalar (AUT)	2
Zainobiddin Nazaraliev (UZB)	5
Shahobuddin Saidov (TJK)	10
Keita Suzuki (JPN)	1
Fariz Aliyev (AZE)	13
Anatol Kachuk (BLR)	2
Tshomlee Go (PHI)	5

Round of 32
Rafik Zohri (NED)	9
Shahobuddin Saidov (TJK)	7
Fariz Aliyev (AZE)	4
Tshomlee Go (PHI)	3

Round of 16
Rafik Zohri (NED)	5
Fariz Aliyev (AZE)	4

==== Section 2 ====
Round of 128
Edgar Recinos (ESA)	RSC
Safwan Khalil (AUS)
Kirk Causadías (PAN)	5
Andrew Mugisha (UGA)	2

Round of 64
Hussein Mohammed (GHA)	3
Edgar Recinos (ESA)	6
~~Adam Sagir (ISR)~~
Liau Molikoe (LES)	DQ
Maciej Ruta (POL)	2
Mussagali Zhumagaliyev (KAZ)	4
Kirk Causadías (PAN)	1
Javier Marrón (ESP)	6

Round of 32
Edgar Recinos (ESA)	6
Liau Molikoe (LES)	11
Mussagali Zhumagaliyev (KAZ)	3
Javier Marrón (ESP)	6

Round of 16
Liau Molikoe (LES)	4
Javier Marrón (ESP)	10

==== Section 3 ====
Round of 128
Angelos Panayiotou (CYP)	3
Jure Pantar (SLO)	2
Oleksandr Shaposhnyk (UKR)	DQ
~~Hugo Fernández (PAR)~~

Round of 64
Ouahid Briki (TUN)	4
Angelos Panayiotou (CYP)	3
~~Langton Chokwenda (ZIM)~~
David Thomas (BEL)	DQ
Marcel Wenceslau (BRA)	2
Lars Ness (NOR)	3
Oleksandr Shaposhnyk (UKR)	0
Mostafa Abuelnaga (EGY)	1

Round of 32
Ouahid Briki (TUN)	8
David Thomas (BEL)	2
Lars Ness (NOR)	5
Mostafa Abuelnaga (EGY)	5

Round of 16
Ouahid Briki (TUN)	4
Lars Ness (NOR)	1

==== Section 4 ====
Round of 128
Moayad Amin (JOR)	DQ
~~Honorin Randriamandimby (MAD)~~
Khalifa Ababacar Sarr (SEN)	DQ
~~Abdulrauf Gerwash (LBA)~~

Round of 64
~~Stevan Rašić (SRB)~~
Moayad Amin (JOR)	DQ
~~Abdulrazak Al-Hallak (SYR)~~
Simon Cox (CAN)	DQ
Alex Sanabria (HON)	11
Mackenson Pierre (HAI)	4
Khalifa Ababacar Sarr (SEN)	1
Reza Naderian (IRI)	5

Round of 32
Moayad Amin (JOR)	5
Simon Cox (CAN)	6
Alex Sanabria (HON)	2
Reza Naderian (IRI)	6

Round of 16
Simon Cox (CAN)	1
Reza Naderian (IRI)	8

=== Bottom half ===
==== Section 5 ====
Round of 128
Samer Chaaya (LIB)	2
Pedro Rinaldi (PUR)	3
Ganesh Khadka (NEP)	1
Boris Winkler (GER)	3
Chu Yuan-chih (TPE)	7
Edgar Borja (ECU)	3

Round of 64
Jean-Noël Obou (CIV)	11
Pedro Rinaldi (PUR)	10
Filip Grgić (CRO)	4
Thomas Concannon (IRL)	3
Brian Gallagher (USA)	7
Boris Winkler (GER)	4
Chu Yuan-chih (TPE)	11
Ziaullah Aimal (AFG)	12

Round of 32
Jean-Noël Obou (CIV)	6
Filip Grgić (CRO)	4
Brian Gallagher (USA)	0
Ziaullah Aimal (AFG)	6

Round of 16
Jean-Noël Obou (CIV)	14
Ziaullah Aimal (AFG)	16

==== Section 6 ====
Round of 128
Lixan Batista (CUB)	2
Ryan Chong (MAS)	3
Roberto Chiarella (ITA)	1
Yeom Hyo-seob (KOR)	4

Round of 64
Dmitry Frank (RUS)	3
Ryan Chong (MAS)	4
Deniss Sisojevs (LAT)	2
Redouane Chtatou (DEN)	3
Nacha Punthong (THA)	DQ
~~Namoa Sitapa (TGA)~~
Yeom Hyo-seob (KOR)	3
Yassine Belhadj (FRA)	1

Round of 32
Ryan Chong (MAS)	2
Redouane Chtatou (DEN)	3
Nacha Punthong (THA)	2
Yeom Hyo-seob (KOR)	4

Round of 16
Redouane Chtatou (DEN)	2
Yeom Hyo-seob (KOR)	7

==== Section 7 ====
Round of 128
Isiah Kasuku (COD)	1
Hernán Villafañe (VEN)	2
Attila Juhász (HUN)	3
Malcolm Tester (NZL)	1

Round of 64
Michael Harvey (GBR)	3
Hernán Villafañe (VEN)	6
Stamen Zahariev (BUL)	1
Pei Guangqi (CHN)	9
Amran Saida (PLE)	1
Khalid Boulabhaiem (MAR)	9
Attila Juhász (HUN)	0
Jairo Rijo (DOM)	4

Round of 32
Hernán Villafañe (VEN)	2
Pei Guangqi (CHN)	8
Khalid Boulabhaiem (MAR)	5
Jairo Rijo (DOM)	8

Round of 16
Pei Guangqi (CHN)	9
Jairo Rijo (DOM)	10

==== Section 8 ====
Round of 128
Nguyễn Thái Hoàng Minh (VIE)	0
Mohammed Qatanani (SWE)	1
Said Gafar Salih (QAT)	5
Matas Norvydas (LTU)	4
Adrian Stalide (ROU)	DQ
~~David Boui (CAF)~~

Round of 64
Alfonso Victoria (MEX)	0
Mohammed Qatanani (SWE)	0
Said Gafar Salih (QAT)	0
Stylianos Mechteridis (GRE)	6
Hassan Mehoula (GAB)	2
Edwin Montoya (COL)	6
Adrian Stalide (ROU)	1
Cem Uluğnuyan (TUR)	9

Round of 32
Alfonso Victoria (MEX)	1
Stylianos Mechteridis (GRE)	0
Edwin Montoya (COL)	5
Cem Uluğnuyan (TUR)	9

Round of 16
Alfonso Victoria (MEX)	5
Cem Uluğnuyan (TUR)	8
