= 2009 World Taekwondo Championships – Women's bantamweight =

Taekwondo competition

Women's bantamweight at the 2009 World Championships
- Venue: Ballerup Super Arena
- Dates: 16 October 2009
- Competitors: 53 from 53 nations

Medalists
gold medal	Danielle Pelham	United States
silver medal	Sarita Phongsri	Thailand
bronze medal	Kwon Eun-kyung	South Korea
bronze medal	Euda Carías	Guatemala

The women's bantamweight is a competition featured at the 2011 World Taekwondo Championships, and was held at the Ballerup Super Arena in Copenhagen, Denmark on October 16. Bantamweights were limited to a maximum of 53 kilograms in body mass.

== Results ==
Legend

- DQ — Won by disqualification

=== Finals ===
Semifinals		Final
Kwon Eun-kyung (KOR)	1
Sarita Phongsri (THA)	2	Sarita Phongsri (THA)	4
Euda Carías (GUA)	5	Danielle Pelham (USA)	5
Danielle Pelham (USA)	6

=== Top half ===
==== Section 1 ====
Round of 64
Cosette Basbous (LIB)	0
Kwon Eun-kyung (KOR)	1
Žaneta Rodovská (CZE)	0
Jennifer Ågren (SWE)	6
Margarita Mkrtchyan (RUS)	4
Monica Pimentel (ARU)	0
Anouk Doria (MON)	1
Honami Kobayashi (JPN)	4
Chhoeung Puthearim (CAM)	1
Lei Jie (CHN)	13

Round of 32
Lamyaa Bekkali (MAR)	0
Kwon Eun-kyung (KOR)	6
Jennifer Ågren (SWE)	2
Margarita Mkrtchyan (RUS)	1
Federica Mastrantoni (ITA)	7
Honami Kobayashi (JPN)	3
Lei Jie (CHN)	8
Gladys Mora (COL)	4

Round of 16
Kwon Eun-kyung (KOR)	11
Jennifer Ågren (SWE)	2
Federica Mastrantoni (ITA)	3
Lei Jie (CHN)	4

Quarterfinals
Kwon Eun-kyung (KOR)	10
Lei Jie (CHN)	5

==== Section 2 ====
Round of 64
Maéva Coutant (FRA)	17
Siham Khaldi (ALG)	1
~~Mónica Salas (CRC)~~
Sara Ramos (PUR)	DQ
Anastasia Birozi (GRE)	3
Lívia Miranda (BRA)	2
Sarita Phongsri (THA)	DQ
~~Shaghaf Al-Assad (SYR)~~
Eunice Alora (PHI)	7
Diahara Touré (MLI)	2
~~Elizabeth Kaemba (KEN)~~
Pamela Santos (MEX)	DQ

Round of 32
Rebeca Mariño (ESP)	6
Maéva Coutant (FRA)	6
Sara Ramos (PUR)	5
Anastasia Birozi (GRE)	3
Sarita Phongsri (THA)	12
Eunice Alora (PHI)	3
Pamela Santos (MEX)	2
Ivett Gonda (CAN)	7

Round of 16
Maéva Coutant (FRA)	5
Sara Ramos (PUR)	1
Sarita Phongsri (THA)	7
Ivett Gonda (CAN)	6

Quarterfinals
Maéva Coutant (FRA)	4
Sarita Phongsri (THA)	5

=== Bottom half ===
==== Section 3 ====
Round of 64
Sinead Joyce (IRL)	1
Yeny Contreras (CHI)	9
Samaneh Sheshpari (IRI)	14
Nataliia Zakhozha (UKR)	4
~~Helen Miniss (ETH)~~
Arzu Baghirova (AZE)	DQ
Bianca D'Andrilli (AUS)	5
Caroline Fisher (GBR)	18
Euda Carías (GUA)	3
Anna Mirkin (ISR)	2

Round of 32
Tseng Yi-hsuan (TPE)	5
Yeny Contreras (CHI)	3
Samaneh Sheshpari (IRI)	8
Arzu Baghirova (AZE)	1
Melanie Hartung (GER)	8
Caroline Fisher (GBR)	0
Euda Carías (GUA)	3
Trần Thị Ngọc Trúc (VIE)	0

Round of 16
Tseng Yi-hsuan (TPE)	9
Samaneh Sheshpari (IRI)	6
Melanie Hartung (GER)	1
Euda Carías (GUA)	3

Quarterfinals
Tseng Yi-hsuan (TPE)	4
Euda Carías (GUA)	7

==== Section 4 ====
Round of 64
Danielle Pelham (USA)	7
Mariem Ahmed (EGY)	1
Faniang Dièye (SEN)	6
Disnansi Polanco (DOM)	3
Charlotte Paik Bjelke (DEN)	1
Krisztina Sikesdi (HUN)	0
Jelena Ivančić (CRO)	3
Miladys Mariño (VEN)	3
Despina Pilavaki (CYP)	0
Saule Sardarova (KAZ)	1

Round of 32
Banassa Diomandé (CIV)	4
Danielle Pelham (USA)	12
Faniang Dièye (SEN)	5
Suvi Mikkonen (FIN)	3
Charlotte Paik Bjelke (DEN)	0
Jelena Ivančić (CRO)	3
Saule Sardarova (KAZ)	3
Sibel Yıldırım (TUR)	2

Round of 16
Danielle Pelham (USA)	4
Faniang Dièye (SEN)	3
Jelena Ivančić (CRO)	6
Saule Sardarova (KAZ)	5

Quarterfinals
Danielle Pelham (USA)	7
Jelena Ivančić (CRO)	6
