= 2009 World Taekwondo Championships – Men's finweight =

Taekwondo competitions

Men's finweight at the 2009 World Championships
- Venue: Ballerup Super Arena
- Dates: 17 October 2009
- Competitors: 59 from 59 nations

Medalists
gold medal	Choi Yeon-ho	South Korea
silver medal	Mahmood Haidari	Afghanistan
bronze medal	Chutchawal Khawlaor	Thailand
bronze medal	Meisam Bagheri	Iran

The men's finweight competition was the lightest class featured at the 2009 World Taekwondo Championships, and was held at the Ballerup Super Arena in Copenhagen, Denmark on October 17. Finweights were limited to a maximum of 54 kilograms in body mass.

== Results ==
Legend

- DQ — Won by disqualification
- WD — Won by withdrawal

=== Finals ===
Semifinals		Final
Mahmood Haidari (AFG)	2
Chutchawal Khawlaor (THA)	0	Mahmood Haidari (AFG)	3
Meisam Bagheri (IRI)	1	Choi Yeon-ho (KOR)	3
Choi Yeon-ho (KOR)	2

=== Top half ===
==== Section 1 ====
Round of 64
Carlos Sánchez (ECU)	WD
Siyovush Khusaynov (TJK)
Vlasios Petropoulos (GRE)	DQ
~~Veatupu Siaosl (TGA)~~
Eldiar Kasmombetov (KGZ)	1
Du Xiang (CHN)	16
Mohammad Al-Bakhit (JOR)	3
Ngô Châu Bảo (VIE)	1
Wilson Semedo (CPV)	5
Mohammed Al-Siade (IRQ)	8
Michael Silva (BRA)	7
Pedro Gago (VEN)	2
Mahmood Haidari (AFG)	6
Gus Villa (MEX)	4

Round of 32
Sherif Wasfy (EGY)	3
Carlos Sánchez (ECU)	1
Vlasios Petropoulos (GRE)	2
Du Xiang (CHN)	6
Mohammad Al-Bakhit (JOR)	8
Mohammed Al-Siade (IRQ)	8
Michael Silva (BRA)	5
Mahmood Haidari (AFG)	9

Round of 16
Sherif Wasfy (EGY)	1
Du Xiang (CHN)	2
Mohammad Al-Bakhit (JOR)	7
Mahmood Haidari (AFG)	8

Quarterfinals
Du Xiang (CHN)	6
Mahmood Haidari (AFG)	8

==== Section 2 ====
Round of 64
~~Ajaiman Al-Ojaiman (KUW)~~
Samir Aydinov (AZE)	DQ
Hsu Chia-lin (TPE)	7
Pasquale Stano (ITA)	4
Jason Tan (SIN)	5
Luis Reyes (USA)	6
Seyfula Magomedov (RUS)	11
Mokdad El-Yamine (ALG)	6
Sisavanh Keoxayadet (LAO)	4
Bob Tshimanga (COD)	5
Daniel Kurvinen (SWE)	2
Audy Muller (AHO)	7

Round of 32
~~Sami Fatnassi (TUN)~~
Samir Aydinov (AZE)	DQ
Hsu Chia-lin (TPE)	5
Luis Reyes (USA)	2
Seyfula Magomedov (RUS)	9
Bob Tshimanga (COD)	0
Audy Muller (AHO)	5
Chutchawal Khawlaor (THA)	7

Round of 16
Samir Aydinov (AZE)	5
Hsu Chia-lin (TPE)	6
Seyfula Magomedov (RUS)	5
Chutchawal Khawlaor (THA)	6

Quarterfinals
Hsu Chia-lin (TPE)	5
Chutchawal Khawlaor (THA)	8

=== Bottom half ===
==== Section 3 ====
Round of 64
Renat Kuralbayev (KAZ)	6
Federico Ferriol (ARG)	4
Yaser Bamatraf (YEM)	7
Sobir Nazaraliev (UZB)	8
Tehir Dogan (AUT)	0
Sasan Dalirnejad (GER)	1
~~Ruetyall Herrera (NCA)~~
Robert Seručar (SLO)	DQ
Marc Arakilo (LIB)	0
Cameron Sutton (AUS)	7
Mirko Madžar (CRO)	5
Duván Avella (COL)	9
Serhiy Mostipaka (UKR)	3
Adrián Cifuentes (ESP)	4

Round of 32
Meisam Bagheri (IRI)	10
Renat Kuralbayev (KAZ)	4
Sobir Nazaraliev (UZB)	5
Sasan Dalirnejad (GER)	6
Robert Seručar (SLO)	6
Cameron Sutton (AUS)	5
Duván Avella (COL)	13
Adrián Cifuentes (ESP)	8

Round of 16
Meisam Bagheri (IRI)	10
Sasan Dalirnejad (GER)	4
Robert Seručar (SLO)	9
Duván Avella (COL)	10

Quarterfinals
Meisam Bagheri (IRI)	12
Duván Avella (COL)	0

==== Section 4 ====
Round of 64
Moussa Cissé (FRA)	9
Liran Malachi (ISR)	6
Christian Marmolejos (DOM)	3
Tadjou Amao (CIV)	1
Ihar Leanovich (BLR)	12
Antonis Pareklisitis (CYP)	3
Japoy Lizardo (PHI)	4
Julio Flores (GUA)	3
Eryk Rodzik (POL)	13
Sandesh Gurung (NEP)	9
Choi Yeon-ho (KOR)	14
Surachet Singsorn (DEN)	2
Gabriel Aliaga (PER)	6
Nicholas Pereira (CAN)	10

Round of 32
Moussa Cissé (FRA)	2
Christian Marmolejos (DOM)	1
Ihar Leanovich (BLR)	4
Japoy Lizardo (PHI)	7
Eryk Rodzik (POL)	2
Choi Yeon-ho (KOR)	11
Nicholas Pereira (CAN)	4
Remzi Başakbuğday (TUR)	5

Round of 16
Moussa Cissé (FRA)	4
Japoy Lizardo (PHI)	3
Choi Yeon-ho (KOR)	4
Remzi Başakbuğday (TUR)	2

Quarterfinals
Moussa Cissé (FRA)	1
Choi Yeon-ho (KOR)	8
