= 2011 World Taekwondo Championships – Women's bantamweight =

Taekwondo competition

Women's bantamweight at the 2011 World Championships
- Venue: Gyeongju Indoor Stadium
- Dates: 2–3 May 2011
- Competitors: 52 from 52 nations

Medalists
gold medal	Ana Zaninović	Croatia
silver medal	Lamyaa Bekkali	Morocco
bronze medal	Lee Hye-young	South Korea
bronze medal	Hatice Kübra Yangın	Turkey

The Women's bantamweight is a competition featured at the 2011 World Taekwondo Championships, and was held at the Gyeongju Gymnasium in Gyeongju, South Korea on May 2 and May 3. Flyweights were limited to a maximum of 53 kilograms in body mass.

== Results ==
Legend

- DQ — Won by disqualification

=== Finals ===
Semifinals		Final
Ana Zaninović (CRO)	13
Lee Hye-young (KOR)	3	Ana Zaninović (CRO)	14
Hatice Kübra Yangın (TUR)	2	Lamyaa Bekkali (MAR)	8
Lamyaa Bekkali (MAR)	3

=== Top half ===
==== Section 1 ====
Round of 64
Jade Zafra (PHI)	11
Cosette Basbous (LIB)	1
Janike Lai (NOR)	DQ
~~Gladys Guacare (VEN)~~
~~Muhandachi Rebeca (KEN)~~
Latika Bhandari (IND)	DQ
Hung Shih-han (TPE)	7
Cheung Yan (HKG)	0
Diahara Touré (MLI)	4
Laura Urriola (ESP)	7

Round of 32
Samaneh Sheshpari (IRI)	11
Jade Zafra (PHI)	1
Janike Lai (NOR)	3
Latika Bhandari (IND)	2
Ana Zaninović (CRO)	12
Hung Shih-han (TPE)	3
Laura Urriola (ESP)	0
Aleksandra Lychagina (RUS)	0

Round of 16
Samaneh Sheshpari (IRI)	10
Janike Lai (NOR)	1
Ana Zaninović (CRO)	13
Laura Urriola (ESP)	1

Quarterfinals
Samaneh Sheshpari (IRI)	5
Ana Zaninović (CRO)	16

==== Section 2 ====
Round of 64
Lívia Miranda (BRA)	DQ
~~Haya Jumaa (UAE)~~
Rahma Ben Ali (TUN)	13
Linda Kilumba (COD)	0
Suvi Mikkonen (FIN)	3
Maéva Coutant (FRA)	8
Aikaterini Piperaki (GRE)	5
Siska Permatasari (INA)	3

Round of 32
Lei Jie (CHN)	14
Lívia Miranda (BRA)	1
Rahma Ben Ali (TUN)	3
Aziza Chambers (USA)	2
Lee Hye-young (KOR)	5
Maéva Coutant (FRA)	2
Aikaterini Piperaki (GRE)	6
Sarita Phongsri (THA)	4

Round of 16
Lei Jie (CHN)	1
Rahma Ben Ali (TUN)	0
Lee Hye-young (KOR)	5
Aikaterini Piperaki (GRE)	0

Quarterfinals
Lei Jie (CHN)	2
Lee Hye-young (KOR)	5

=== Bottom half ===
==== Section 3 ====
Round of 64
Michelle García (MEX)	2
Christina Carstens (PAN)	7
Sümeyye Karaahmet (GER)	2
Disnansi Polanco (DOM)	6
Katerina Artemiou (CYP)	7
Katsiaryna Lis (BLR)	13
Mayu Hamada (JPN)	13
Nino Beridze (GEO)	1
Caroline Maher (EGY)	1
Myrllam Vargas (PUR)	4

Round of 32
Ivett Gonda (CAN)	6
Christina Carstens (PAN)	1
Disnansi Polanco (DOM)	3
Katsiaryna Lis (BLR)	0
Caroline Fisher (GBR)	11
Mayu Hamada (JPN)	10
Myrllam Vargas (PUR)	2
Hatice Kübra Yangın (TUR)	3

Round of 16
Ivett Gonda (CAN)	10
Disnansi Polanco (DOM)	1
Caroline Fisher (GBR)	4
Hatice Kübra Yangın (TUR)	7

Quarterfinals
Ivett Gonda (CAN)	6
Hatice Kübra Yangın (TUR)	7

==== Section 4 ====
Round of 64
Christina Schönegger (AUT)	DQ
~~Miryam Soler (COL)~~
Khandyn Urtbayar (MGL)	4
Guzal Narbabaeva (UZB)	6
Nigar Hajiyeva (AZE)	DQ
~~Lianne Muller (AHO)~~
Chhoeung Puthearim (CAM)	1
Bernadette Branca (AUS)	4
Vanessa Jarisse (MOZ)	7
Nguyễn Thị Thanh Thảo (VIE)	11

Round of 32
Shahd Al-Tarman (JOR)	8
Christina Schönegger (AUT)	3
Guzal Narbabaeva (UZB)	8
Saule Sardarova (KAZ)	6
Nigar Hajiyeva (AZE)	0
Bernadette Branca (AUS)	2
Nguyễn Thị Thanh Thảo (VIE)	1
Lamyaa Bekkali (MAR)	13

Round of 16
Shahd Al-Tarman (JOR)	9
Guzal Narbabaeva (UZB)	2
Bernadette Branca (AUS)	0
Lamyaa Bekkali (MAR)	6

Quarterfinals
Shahd Al-Tarman (JOR)	3
Lamyaa Bekkali (MAR)	4
