= 2009 World Cup Taekwondo Team Championships =

Taekwondo competition

2009 Taekwondo World Cup
- Venue: Baku Sports Hall
- Location: Baku, Azerbaijan
- Dates: 11–14 June 2009

Champions
- Men: Turkey
- Women: South Korea

The 2009 World Cup Taekwondo Team Championships is the 2nd edition of the World Cup Taekwondo Team Championships, and was held at Baku Sports Hall in Baku, Azerbaijan from June 11 to June 14, 2009.

The participating male and female teams are divided into six groups each and the top four countries at the previous championship and the host country are seeded. Top six teams and two best-record teams among the second-placed teams in the men's and women's division of the preliminary round advance to the quarterfinal round. The quarterfinal, semifinal and final matches are conducted in a single elimination format.

== Medalists ==
Event	Gold	Silver	Bronze
Men	Turkey; Remzi Başakbuğday; Rıdvan Baygut; Köksal Durusoy; Hüseyin Özsoy; Soner Pınarcık; Ali Sarı; Bahri Tanrıkulu; Servet Tazegül; Cem Uluğnuyan; Serdar Yüksel	Iran; Hadi Afshar; Meisam Bagheri; Mohammad Bagheri Motamed; Yousef Karami; Behzad Khodadad; Reza Naderian; Alireza Nasr Azadani; Kourosh Rajoli; Alireza Shakouri; Hossein Tajik	Azerbaijan; Rashad Ahmadov; Samir Aydinov; Ramin Azizov; Tavakkul Bayramov; Rovshan Mammadov; Zahid Mammadov; Ilkin Shahbazov
Men	Turkey; Remzi Başakbuğday; Rıdvan Baygut; Köksal Durusoy; Hüseyin Özsoy; Soner Pınarcık; Ali Sarı; Bahri Tanrıkulu; Servet Tazegül; Cem Uluğnuyan; Serdar Yüksel	Iran; Hadi Afshar; Meisam Bagheri; Mohammad Bagheri Motamed; Yousef Karami; Behzad Khodadad; Reza Naderian; Alireza Nasr Azadani; Kourosh Rajoli; Alireza Shakouri; Hossein Tajik	Russia; Sergey De; Magomed Ibragimov; Yury Kirichenko; Ibragim Mekhtiev; Denis Mikhaylov; Ismail Musaev; Aleksandr Peregudov; Aydemir Shakhbanov; Gadzhi Umarov
Women	South Korea; Jang Eun-suk; Jin Chae-lin; Oh Hye-ri; Oh Na-ri; Sim Yeon-joo	Russia; Anastasia Baryshnikova; Irina Bykova; Anna Drozdova; Kristina Khafizova; Maria Likhomanova; Anna Soboleva; Ekaterina Zenkina	Turkey; Tuba Abuş; Burcu Altun; Furkan Asena Aydın; Zeynep Kiraz; Kadriye Selimoğlu; Nur Tatar; Azize Tanrıkulu; Sevcan Tokaç; Rukiye Yıldırım; Sibel Yıldırım
Women	South Korea; Jang Eun-suk; Jin Chae-lin; Oh Hye-ri; Oh Na-ri; Sim Yeon-joo	Russia; Anastasia Baryshnikova; Irina Bykova; Anna Drozdova; Kristina Khafizova; Maria Likhomanova; Anna Soboleva; Ekaterina Zenkina	Morocco; Sanaa Atabrour; Naima Bakkal; Lamyaa Bekkali; Wiam Dislam; Hakima El-Meslahy

== Men ==
=== Preliminary round ===
==== Group A ====
Pos	Team	Pld	W	L	MF	MA	Pts	KOR	FRA	GRE	CAN
1	South Korea	3	3	0	10	5	6	—	3–2	3–2	4–1
2	France	3	2	1	11	4	4	2–3	—	5–0	4–1
3	Greece	3	1	2	5	10	2	2–3	0–5	—	3–2
4	Canada	3	0	3	4	11	0	1–4	1–4	2–3	—

Source: Mas Taekwondo

==== Group B ====
Pos	Team	Pld	W	L	MF	MA	Pts	JOR	NED	TPE	UKR
1	Jordan	3	3	0	11	4	6	—	4–1	3–2	4–1
2	Netherlands	3	2	1	8	7	4	1–4	—	3–2	4–1
3	Chinese Taipei	3	1	2	7	8	2	2–3	2–3	—	3–2
4	Ukraine	3	0	3	4	11	0	1–4	1–4	2–3	—

Source: Mas Taekwondo

==== Group C ====
Pos	Team	Pld	W	L	MF	MA	Pts	TUR	MEX	CHN	AUS
1	Turkey	3	3	0	11	2	6	—	3–2	5–0	3–0
2	Mexico	3	2	1	8	5	4	2–3	—	3–2	3–0
3	China	3	1	2	5	8	2	0–5	2–3	—	3–0
4	Australia	3	0	3	0	9	0	0–3	0–3	0–3	—

Source: Mas Taekwondo

==== Group D ====
Pos	Team	Pld	W	L	MF	MA	Pts	IRI	GER	EGY	KAZ
1	Iran	3	3	0	15	0	6	—	5–0	5–0	5–0
2	Germany	3	2	1	7	8	4	0–5	—	3–2	4–1
3	Egypt	3	1	2	5	10	2	0–5	2–3	—	3–2
4	Kazakhstan	3	0	3	3	12	0	0–5	1–4	2–3	—

Source: Mas Taekwondo

==== Group E ====
Pos	Team	Pld	W	L	MF	MA	Pts	ESP	GBR	GEO	MLI
1	Spain	3	3	0	11	2	6	—	3–2	5–0	3–0
2	Great Britain	3	2	1	9	4	4	2–3	—	4–1	3–0
3	Georgia	3	1	2	4	9	2	0–5	1–4	—	3–0
4	Mali	3	0	3	0	9	0	0–3	0–3	0–3	—

Source: Mas Taekwondo

==== Group F ====
Pos	Team	Pld	W	L	MF	MA	Pts	RUS	AZE	ITA	BRA
1	Russia	3	3	0	10	5	6	—	3–2	3–2	4–1
2	Azerbaijan	3	2	1	11	4	4	2–3	—	5–0	4–1
3	Italy	3	1	2	5	10	2	2–3	0–5	—	3–2
4	Brazil	3	0	3	4	11	0	1–4	1–4	2–3	—

Source: Mas Taekwondo

=== Knockout round ===
Quarterfinals		Semifinals		Final
South Korea	2
Azerbaijan	3	Azerbaijan	2
Jordan	2	Turkey	3
Turkey	3			Turkey	3
Spain	2			Iran	2
Russia	3	Russia	2
Iran	4	Iran	3
France	1

Weight	Final		
	Turkey	3–2	Iran
−54 kg	Remzi Başakbuğday	11–3	Alireza Shakouri
−63 kg	Cem Uluğnuyan	4–5	Reza Naderian
−72 kg	Servet Tazegül	4–7	Alireza Nasr Azadani
−82 kg	Bahri Tanrıkulu	3–2	Kourosh Rajoli
+82 kg	Soner Pınarcık	3–1	Hossein Tajik

== Women ==
=== Preliminary round ===
==== Group A ====
Pos	Team	Pld	W	L	MF	MA	Pts	KOR	RUS	KAZ	NED
1	South Korea	3	3	0	12	3	6	—	4–1	5–0	3–2
2	Russia	3	2	1	9	6	4	1–4	—	5–0	3–2
3	Kazakhstan	3	1	2	3	12	2	0–5	0–5	—	3–2
4	Netherlands	3	0	3	6	9	0	2–3	2–3	2–3	—

Source: Mas Taekwondo

==== Group B ====
Pos	Team	Pld	W	L	MF	MA	Pts	ESP	GER	ITA	VIE
1	Spain	3	3	0	14	1	6	—	4–1	5–0	5–0
2	Germany	3	2	1	8	7	4	1–4	—	3–2	4–1
3	Italy	3	1	2	5	10	2	0–5	2–3	—	3–2
4	Vietnam	3	0	3	3	12	0	0–5	1–4	2–3	—

Source: Mas Taekwondo

==== Group C ====
Pos	Team	Pld	W	L	MF	MA	Pts	TUR	MEX	SWE	VEN
1	Turkey	3	3	0	11	4	6	—	4–1	3–2	4–1
2	Mexico	3	2	1	9	6	4	1–4	—	4–1	4–1
3	Sweden	3	1	2	6	9	2	2–3	1–4	—	3–2
4	Venezuela	3	0	3	4	11	0	1–4	1–4	2–3	—

Source: Mas Taekwondo

==== Group D ====
Pos	Team	Pld	W	L	MF	MA	Pts	CHN	FRA	UZB	AUS
1	China	3	3	0	12	3	6	—	3–2	5–0	4–1
2	France	3	2	1	11	4	4	2–3	—	4–1	5–0
3	Uzbekistan	3	1	2	5	10	2	0–5	1–4	—	4–1
4	Australia	3	0	3	2	13	0	1–4	0–5	1–4	—

Source: Mas Taekwondo

==== Group E ====
Pos	Team	Pld	W	L	MF	MA	Pts	MAR	IRI	CAN	GBR
1	Morocco	3	3	0	10	5	6	—	3–2	4–1	3–2
2	Iran	3	2	1	9	6	4	2–3	—	4–1	3–2
3	Canada	3	1	2	6	9	2	1–4	1–4	—	4–1
4	Great Britain	3	0	3	5	10	0	2–3	2–3	1–4	—

Source: Mas Taekwondo

==== Group F ====
Pos	Team	Pld	W	L	MF	MA	Pts	BRA	GRE	AZE	SEN
1	Brazil	3	3	0	10	3	6	—	3–2	4–1	3–0
2	Greece	3	2	1	8	5	4	2–3	—	3–2	3–0
3	Azerbaijan	3	1	2	6	7	2	1–4	2–3	—	3–0
4	Senegal	3	0	3	0	9	0	0–3	0–3	0–3	—

Source: Mas Taekwondo

=== Knockout round ===
Quarterfinals		Semifinals		Final
South Korea	3
France	2	South Korea	3
Spain	1	Turkey	2
Turkey	4			South Korea	3
Morocco	3			Russia	2
Brazil	2	Morocco	2
China	2	Russia	3
Russia	3

Weight	Final		
	South Korea	3–2	Russia
−47 kg	Sim Yeon-joo	WO	Anna Soboleva
−54 kg	Jang Eun-suk	13–8	Maria Likhomanova
−61 kg	Oh Na-ri	4–1	Kristina Khafizova
−68 kg	Jin Chae-lin	WO	Ekaterina Zenkina
+68 kg	Oh Hye-ri	4–1	Anastasia Baryshnikova
