= 2009 World Taekwondo Championships – Women's finweight =

Taekwondo competition

Women's finweight at the 2009 World Championships
- Venue: Ballerup Super Arena
- Dates: 17 October 2009
- Competitors: 41 from 41 nations

Medalists
| gold medal | Park Hyo-ji | South Korea |
| silver medal | Zoraida Santiago | Puerto Rico |
| bronze medal | Buttree Puedpong | Thailand |
| bronze medal | Yvette Yong | Canada |

The Women's finweight competition was the lightest class featured at the 2009 World Taekwondo Championships, and was held at the Ballerup Super Arena in Copenhagen, Denmark on October 17. Finweights were limited to a maximum of 46 kilograms in body mass.

== Results ==
Legend

- DQ — Won by disqualification
- RSC — Won by referee stop contest

=== Finals ===
| Semifinals | | Final |
| Buttree Puedpong (THA) | 4 |
| Park Hyo-ji (KOR) | 7 | Park Hyo-ji (KOR) | 3 |
| Yvette Yong (CAN) | 2 | Zoraida Santiago (PUR) | 2 |
| Zoraida Santiago (PUR) | 3 |

=== Top half ===
==== Section 1 ====
Round of 64
Nguyễn Thị Bích Ngọc (VIE) | 4
Anna Dimitriou (CYP) | 0
~~Mistre Bitew (ETH)~~
Radwa Reda (EGY) | DQ
Roberta Ramazzotto (ITA) | 8
Assylzat Alzhanova (KAZ) | 2

Round of 32
Buttree Puedpong (THA) | 16
Nguyễn Thị Bích Ngọc (VIE) | 1
Victoria Álvarez (CHI) | DQ
~~Kin Mohamed (KEN)~~
Katia Arakaki (BRA) | 6
Radwa Reda (EGY) | 5
Roberta Ramazzotto (ITA) | 2
Zhang Qiang (CHN) | 3

Round of 16
Buttree Puedpong (THA) | 2
Victoria Álvarez (CHI) | 0
Katia Arakaki (BRA) | 6
Zhang Qiang (CHN) | 9

Quarterfinals
Buttree Puedpong (THA) | 4
Zhang Qiang (CHN) | 1

==== Section 2 ====
Round of 64
Talina Le (USA) | 0
Marilyn Pérez (VEN) | 1
Liliana Mircică (ROU) | 0
Huang Hsien-yung (TPE) | 13

Round of 32
Park Hyo-ji (KOR) | 3
Marilyn Pérez (VEN) | 0
Andrea Kilday (NZL) | 6
Mayelin Reyes (DOM) | 9
Yania Aguirre (CUB) | DQ
~~Sharmin Rumi (BAN)~~
Huang Hsien-yung (TPE) | 11
Ruth Gbagbi (CIV) | 4

Round of 16
Park Hyo-ji (KOR) | 6
Mayelin Reyes (DOM) | 5
Yania Aguirre (CUB) | 7
Huang Hsien-yung (TPE) | 4

Quarterfinals
Park Hyo-ji (KOR) | 5
Yania Aguirre (CUB) | 4

=== Bottom half ===
==== Section 3 ====
Round of 64
Anneleen Goffin (BEL) | 3
Nancy Orduz (COL) | 1
May Ågren (SWE) | 3
Ioanna Koutsou (GRE) | 4

Round of 32
Elaia Torrontegui (ESP) | 11
Anneleen Goffin (BEL) | 3
Jasmine Branca (AUS) | 3
Yuliya Volkova (UKR) | 4
Fatemeh Nemati (IRI) | 14
Khayala Guliyeva (AZE) | 1
Ioanna Koutsou (GRE)
Yvette Yong (CAN) | RSC

Round of 16
Elaia Torrontegui (ESP) | 4
Yuliya Volkova (UKR) | 1
Fatemeh Nemati (IRI) | 6
Yvette Yong (CAN) | 7

Quarterfinals
Elaia Torrontegui (ESP) | 7
Yvette Yong (CAN) | 8

==== Section 4 ====
Round of 64
Daniela Padilla (MEX) | 0
Zoraida Santiago (PUR) | 4
Moliehi Raboroko (LES) | 5
Andrea Erazo (HON) | 4

Round of 32
Kristina Kim (RUS) | 0
Zoraida Santiago (PUR) | 0
Iliana Eneva (BUL) | 2
Alison Pinteno (FRA) | 6
Andrea Franco (BOL) | 0
Jenifer Ordoñez (GUA) | 6
Moliehi Raboroko (LES) | 3
Rukiye Yıldırım (TUR) | 18

Round of 16
Zoraida Santiago (PUR) | 3
Alison Pinteno (FRA) | 2
Jenifer Ordoñez (GUA) | 5
Rukiye Yıldırım (TUR) | 4

Quarterfinals
Zoraida Santiago (PUR) | 7
Jenifer Ordoñez (GUA) | 6
