= Taekwondo at the 2010 Asian Games – Men's 63 kg =

Taekwondo competition

Men's 63 kg at the 2010 Asian Games
- Venue: Guangdong Gymnasium
- Date: 19 November 2010
- Competitors: 22 from 22 nations

Medalists
gold medal	Lee Dae-hoon	South Korea
silver medal	Nacha Punthong	Thailand
bronze medal	Jawad Lakzaee	Afghanistan
bronze medal	Tshomlee Go	Philippines

The men's bantamweight (−63 kilograms) event at the 2010 Asian Games took place on 19 November 2010 at Guangdong Gymnasium, Guangzhou, China.

== Schedule ==
All times are China Standard Time (UTC+08:00)

Date	Time	Event
Friday, 19 November 2010	09:00	1/16 finals
Friday, 19 November 2010	09:00	1/8 finals
Friday, 19 November 2010	14:00	Quarterfinals
Friday, 19 November 2010	14:00	Semifinals
Friday, 19 November 2010	16:30	Final

== Results ==
Legend

- R — Won by referee stop contest

=== Final ===
Final
Nacha Punthong (THA)	9
Lee Dae-hoon (KOR)	10

=== Top half ===
1/16 finals
Nacha Punthong (THA)	9
Phouthasone Thammavong (LAO)	1
Orazgeldi Orazgeldiýew (TKM)	0
Poon Chun Ho (HKG)	13
Surendra Bhandari (IND)	7
Darkhan Kassymkulov (KAZ)	8

1/8 finals
Tandin Dendup (BHU)	0
Nacha Punthong (THA)	9^{R}
Khalid Al-Zaid (IOC)	5
Yuki Mitsuhashi (JPN)	7
Kanaan Kanaan (JOR)	1
Poon Chun Ho (HKG)	1
Darkhan Kassymkulov (KAZ)	5
Jawad Lakzaee (AFG)	10

Quarterfinals
Nacha Punthong (THA)	5
Yuki Mitsuhashi (JPN)	4
Kanaan Kanaan (JOR)	6
Jawad Lakzaee (AFG)	7

Semifinals
Nacha Punthong (THA)	7
Jawad Lakzaee (AFG)	3

=== Bottom half ===
1/16 finals
Leonel Alves Almeida (TLS)	0
Chu Yuan-chih (TPE)	13^{R}
Mubarak Al-Shareef (KSA)	0
Lee Dae-hoon (KOR)	29^{R}
Reza Naderian (IRI)	10
Sujan Joshi (NEP)	0

1/8 finals
Mahmood Adel (BRN)	4
Chu Yuan-chih (TPE)	5
Lee Dae-hoon (KOR)	21^{R}
Muaadh Abad (YEM)	1
Tilek Tursunaliev (KGZ)	0
Khusrav Giyosov (TJK)	3
Reza Naderian (IRI)	7
Tshomlee Go (PHI)	9

Quarterfinals
Chu Yuan-chih (TPE)	4
Lee Dae-hoon (KOR)	24
Khusrav Giyosov (TJK)	3
Tshomlee Go (PHI)	11

Semifinals
Lee Dae-hoon (KOR)	5
Tshomlee Go (PHI)	4
