= Taekwondo at the 2010 Asian Games – Women's 53 kg =

Taekwondo competition

Women's 53 kg at the 2010 Asian Games
- Venue: Guangdong Gymnasium
- Date: 18 November 2010
- Competitors: 19 from 19 nations

Medalists
gold medal	Sarita Phongsri	Thailand
silver medal	Nguyễn Thị Hoài Thu	Vietnam
bronze medal	Kwon Eun-kyung	South Korea
bronze medal	Samaneh Sheshpari	Iran

The women's bantamweight (−53 kilograms) event at the 2010 Asian Games took place on 18 November 2010 at Guangdong Gymnasium, Guangzhou, China.

== Schedule ==
All times are China Standard Time (UTC+08:00)

Date	Time	Event
Thursday, 18 November 2010	09:00	1/16 finals
Thursday, 18 November 2010	09:00	1/8 finals
Thursday, 18 November 2010	14:00	Quarterfinals
Thursday, 18 November 2010	14:00	Semifinals
Thursday, 18 November 2010	16:30	Final

== Results ==
Legend

- DQ — Won by disqualification
- W — Won by withdrawal

=== Final ===
Final
Sarita Phongsri (THA)	4
Nguyễn Thị Hoài Thu (VIE)	3

=== Top half ===
1/16 finals
Ayasha Shakya (NEP)	8
Cosette Basbous (LIB)	12

1/8 finals
Sarita Phongsri (THA)	3
Cosette Basbous (LIB)	0
Chhoeung Puthearim (CAM)	10
Latika Bhandari (IND)	11
Nurul Nadia Mahamat (MAS)	2
Kwon Eun-kyung (KOR)	8
Tseng Yi-hsuan (TPE)	1
Jade Zafra (PHI)	12

Quarterfinals
Sarita Phongsri (THA)	6
Latika Bhandari (IND)	0
Kwon Eun-kyung (KOR)	15
Jade Zafra (PHI)	6

Semifinals
Sarita Phongsri (THA)	3^{W}
Kwon Eun-kyung (KOR)	3

=== Bottom half ===
1/16 finals
Lei Jie (CHN)	17
Humaira Mohammadi (AFG)	3
Saule Sardarova (KAZ)	3
Irina Kaydashova (UZB)	5

1/8 finals
Shahd Al-Tarman (JOR)	9
Lei Jie (CHN)	1
Samaneh Sheshpari (IRI)	6
Kristina Korobko (TJK)	2
Kaltham Jasim (BRN)
Nguyễn Thị Hoài Thu (VIE)	DQ
Irina Kaydashova (UZB)	11
Kaltom Mubarak (QAT)	0

Quarterfinals
Shahd Al-Tarman (JOR)	6
Samaneh Sheshpari (IRI)	15
Nguyễn Thị Hoài Thu (VIE)	7
Irina Kaydashova (UZB)	1

Semifinals
Samaneh Sheshpari (IRI)	13
Nguyễn Thị Hoài Thu (VIE)	16
