= Ahmad Abughaush =

Jordanian taekwondo athlete

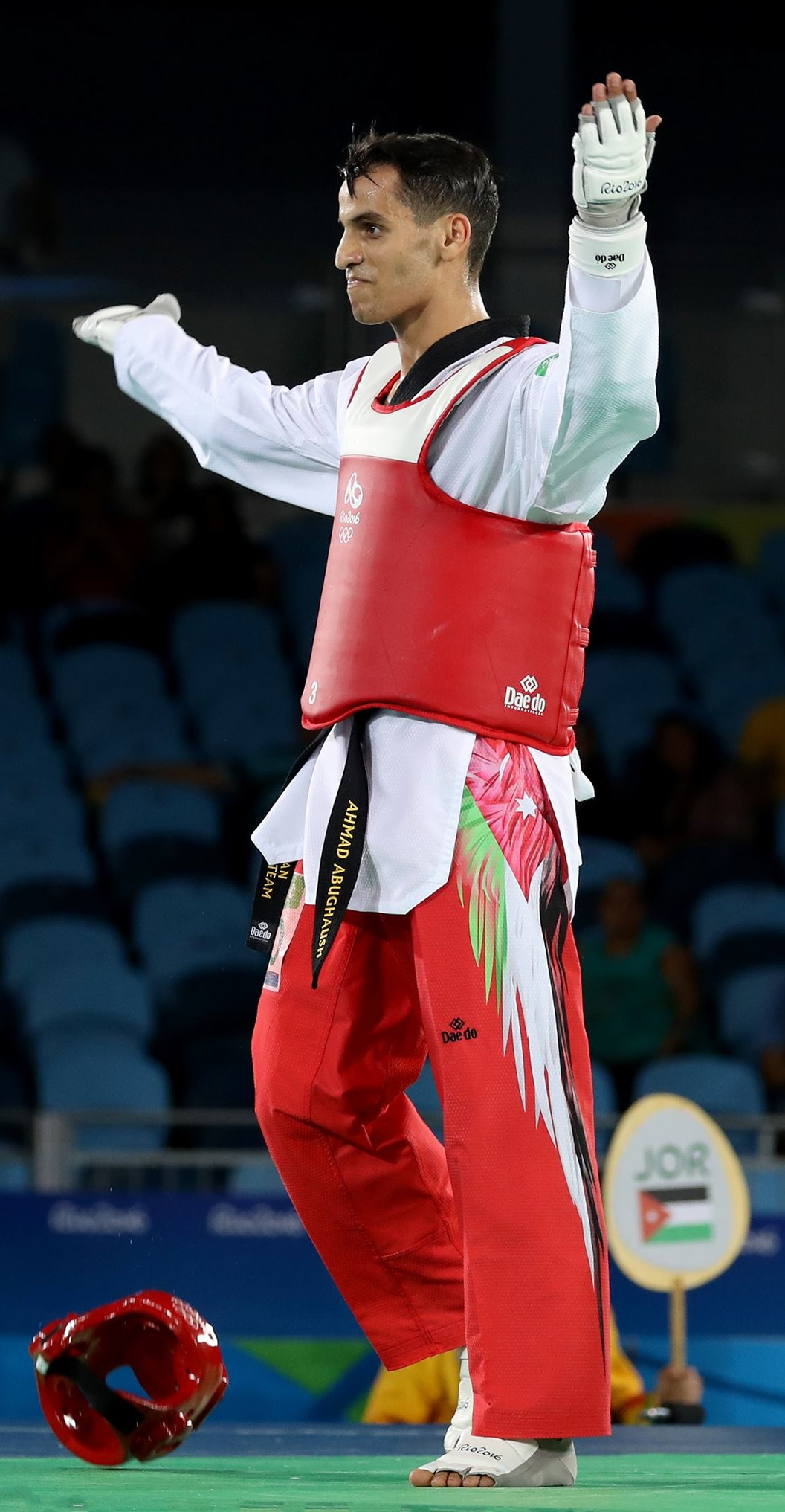
- Abughaush at the 2016 Olympics

Personal information
- Born: 1 February 1996 (age 30) Amman, Jordan
- Education: Al-Ahliyya Amman University
- Height: 178 cm (5 ft 10 in)
- Weight: 68 kg (150 lb)

Sport
- Sport: Taekwondo
- Coached by: Laith Othman (personal); Chang Wen-Ping (national)
Medal record
Representing Jordan
Olympic Games
Gold medal – first place	2016 Rio de Janeiro	68 kg
World Championships
Silver medal – second place	2019 Manchester	74 kg
Bronze medal – third place	2017 Muju	68 kg
Grand Prix
Gold medal – first place	2017 London	68 kg
Bronze medal – third place	2017 Moscow	68 kg
Asian Games
Bronze medal – third place	2018 Jakarta	68 kg
Universiade
Bronze medal – third place	2017 Taipei	68 kg
World Junior Championships
Gold medal – first place	2012 Sharm El-Sheikh	63 kg
Asian Junior Championships
Gold medal – first place	2012 Ho Chi Minh City	63 kg

Ahmad Abughaush (Arabic: أحمد أبو غوش; born 1 February 1996) is a Jordanian taekwondo athlete. He won the gold medal in the 68 kg category at the 2016 Olympics. This was Jordan's first Olympic medal in any sport, excluding a bronze in 1988 when taekwondo was a demonstration sport.

== Biography ==
Abughaush was born in Amman, Jordan. His father is of Palestinian descent, his grandparents having been relocated from the town of Abu Ghosh to Jordan decades earlier.

Abughaush started Taekwondo at a local training center in Amman, his skills qualified him for inclusion in the national team. In 2010, he participated in the Taekwondo World Championship for juniors that was held in Sharm el-Sheikh, where he was the only Arab athlete to achieve a gold medal. The year later he competed as an elite at the 2011 World Taekwondo Championships in the men's finweight event and was beaten by Meisam Bagheri in the 16th finals. He participated in a number of more championships and was given the best Jordanian athlete award by the Jordan Olympic Committee in 2012. Abugaush took a year off in 2013 after he had suffered a rupture in the cruciate ligament, he soon returned to training and won gold medals in a number of international championships in 2014.

== 2016 Summer Olympics ==
Abughaush competed at the 2016 Summer Olympics in Rio de Janeiro, in the men's 68 kg, where he won the gold medal, defeating Alexey Denisenko from Russia. This was Jordan's first ever Olympic medal. Abughaush told the press "it's an indescribable feeling to win the first medal in the history of Jordan in all the sports" and said "it's also a great feeling to listen to the national anthem of Jordan being played in Rio in front of the whole world."

In an interview with Ro'ya TV, Abughaush's parents said that "Ahmad's accomplishment is an honour to Jordan". They went on to thank the Jordan Olympic Committee and the Jordanian Royal family for their support, namely King Abdullah II, Crown Prince Hussein and Prince Ali. King Abdullah and Prince Hussein personally called Abughaush to congratulate him on his accomplishment, while Prince Ali, who is well known for sponsoring sports in Jordan, had also personally supported Abughaush's path to the Olympics.

The Jordan Olympic Committee issued a 100,000 JD (around $141,000) award for Abughaush and a 50,000 JD (around $71,000) for his coach Faris Al-Assaf, upon their return from Rio. Queen Alia International Airport witnessed a large public celebration for Abughaush and the Olympic delegation.
