= 2011 World Taekwondo Championships – Men's finweight =

Taekwondo competition

Men's finweight at the 2011 World Championships
- Venue: Gyeongju Indoor Stadium
- Dates: 4–5 May 2011
- Competitors: 60 from 60 nations

Medalists
gold medal	Chutchawal Khawlaor	Thailand
silver medal	Park Ji-woong	South Korea
bronze medal	Seyfula Magomedov	Russia
bronze medal	Meisam Bagheri	Iran

The Men's finweight is a competition featured at the 2011 World Taekwondo Championships, and was held at the Gyeongju Gymnasium in Gyeongju, South Korea on May 4 and May 5. Finweights were limited to a maximum of 54 kilograms in body mass.

== Results ==
Legend

- DQ — Won by disqualification

=== Finals ===
Semifinals		Final
Chutchawal Khawlaor (THA)	7
Seyfula Magomedov (RUS)	5	Chutchawal Khawlaor (THA)	1
Meisam Bagheri (IRI)	3	Park Ji-woong (KOR)	0
Park Ji-woong (KOR)	4

=== Top half ===
==== Section 1 ====
Round of 64
Nguyễn Hữu Nhân (VIE)	6
Frederico Muianga (MOZ)	5
Giorgio Janmaat (NED)	0
Zhao Shuai (CHN)	2
~~Luis Arroyo (PUR)~~
Majed Al-Marzouqi (UAE)	DQ
Samir Aydinov (AZE)	2
Abdul Wahab Zazai (AFG)	3
César Martínez (DOM)	13
Salvatore Sangregorio (ITA)	3
~~Haris Mušija (BIH)~~
Thomas Liapis (GRE)	DQ
Flavien Furet (FRA)	DQ
~~Duván Avella (COL)~~

Round of 32
Chutchawal Khawlaor (THA)	4
Nguyễn Hữu Nhân (VIE)	4
Zhao Shuai (CHN)	12
Majed Al-Marzouqi (UAE)	0
Abdul Wahab Zazai (AFG)	7
César Martínez (DOM)	5
Thomas Liapis (GRE)	1
Flavien Furet (FRA)	8

Round of 16
Chutchawal Khawlaor (THA)	4
Zhao Shuai (CHN)	2
Abdul Wahab Zazai (AFG)	5
Flavien Furet (FRA)	2

Quarterfinals
Chutchawal Khawlaor (THA)	8
Abdul Wahab Zazai (AFG)	8

==== Section 2 ====
Round of 64
Mokdad El-Yamine (ALG)	8
Naing Dwe Shein (MYA)	2
Michael Silva (BRA)	6
Ron Atias (ISR)	4
Marumo Moloisane (LES)	DQ
~~Bob Tshimanga (COD)~~
Steve Foullas (AUS)	1
Adrián Cifuentes (ESP)	9
Camilo Pérez (CHI)	14
Keith Ong (SIN)	1
Mohamed Dhair (QAT)	DQ
~~Ali Suliman (SUD)~~
Mehdi Amhand (SUI)	12
Pedro Romualdo (ESA)	0

Round of 32
Mokdad El-Yamine (ALG)	5
Michael Silva (BRA)	6
Marumo Moloisane (LES)	2
Adrián Cifuentes (ESP)	5
Camilo Pérez (CHI)	11
Mohamed Dhair (QAT)	2
Mehdi Amhand (SUI)	2
Seyfula Magomedov (RUS)	8

Round of 16
Michael Silva (BRA)	8
Adrián Cifuentes (ESP)	5
Camilo Pérez (CHI)	1
Seyfula Magomedov (RUS)	8

Quarterfinals
Michael Silva (BRA)	3
Seyfula Magomedov (RUS)	6

=== Bottom half ===
==== Section 3 ====
Round of 64
Luis Reyes (USA)	2
Ahmad Abughaush (JOR)	7
Kael Pinto (CAN)	2
Varag Aghajanyan (ARM)	4
Yorkin Babanazarov (UZB)	1
Abderrahmane Guennouni (MAR)	3
Sergej Kolb (GER)	12
Surachet Singsorn (DEN)	0
Dmytro Glushenko (UKR)	3
Ahmad Nabil (INA)	5
Thierry Mabounda (CGO)	6
Serdambyn Tümendemberel (MGL)	7
Roberto Feldt (SWE)	7
Japoy Lizardo (PHI)	10

Round of 32
Meisam Bagheri (IRI)	2
Ahmad Abughaush (JOR)	1
Varag Aghajanyan (ARM)	4
Abderrahmane Guennouni (MAR)	0
Sergej Kolb (GER)	6
Ahmad Nabil (INA)	2
Serdambyn Tümendemberel (MGL)	1
Japoy Lizardo (PHI)	14

Round of 16
Meisam Bagheri (IRI)	3
Varag Aghajanyan (ARM)	0
Sergej Kolb (GER)	10
Japoy Lizardo (PHI)	3

Quarterfinals
Meisam Bagheri (IRI)	10
Sergej Kolb (GER)	5

==== Section 4 ====
Round of 64
Hsu Chia-lin (TPE)	DQ
~~Shriha Yosef Salah (LBA)~~
Renat Kuralbayev (KAZ)	6
Milenko Nestorov (SRB)	0
~~Cleiver Olaizola (VEN)~~
Abrar Khan (IND)	DQ
~~Takaya Nakagawa (JPN)~~	11
Gus Villa (MEX)	12
Park Ji-woong (KOR)	DQ
~~Boniface Issa (CMR)~~
Tung Ming Hung (HKG)	3
Vakhtang Japaridze (GEO)	15
Ömer Aksoy (TUR)	DQ
~~Santiago Marques (TLS)~~

Round of 32
Hsu Chia-lin (TPE)	4
Renat Kuralbayev (KAZ)	3
Abrar Khan (IND)	5
Gus Villa (MEX)	6
Park Ji-woong (KOR)	9
Vakhtang Japaridze (GEO)	6
Ömer Aksoy (TUR)	3
Sherif Wasfy (EGY)	4

Round of 16
Hsu Chia-lin (TPE)	7
Gus Villa (MEX)	6
Park Ji-woong (KOR)	6
Sherif Wasfy (EGY)	0

Quarterfinals
Hsu Chia-lin (TPE)	5
Park Ji-woong (KOR)	8
