= Danielle Pelham =

American taekwondo practitioner

Personal information
- Nationality: American
- Born: December 19, 1984 (age 41)

Sport
- Sport: Taekwondo
Medal record
Representing the United States
Women's taekwondo
World Championships
| Gold medal – first place | 2009 Copenhagen | Bantamweight |

Danielle Pelham (born December 19, 1984) is an American taekwondo practitioner.

She won a gold medal in bantamweight at the 2009 World Taekwondo Championships in Copenhagen, by defeating Euda Carías in the semifinal, and Sarita Phongsri in the final.
