= Taekwondo at the 2006 Asian Games – Men's 62 kg =

Taekwondo competition

Men's 62 kg at the 2006 Asian Games
- Venue: Qatar SC Indoor Hall
- Date: 9 December 2006
- Competitors: 20 from 20 nations

Medalists
gold medal	Kim Ju-young	South Korea
silver medal	Tshomlee Go	Philippines
bronze medal	Vũ Anh Tuấn	Vietnam
bronze medal	Su Tai-yuan	Chinese Taipei

The men's bantamweight (−62 kilograms) event at the 2006 Asian Games took place on 9 December 2006 at Qatar SC Indoor Hall, Doha, Qatar.

== Schedule ==
All times are Arabia Standard Time (UTC+03:00)

Date	Time	Event
Saturday, 9 December 2006	14:00	1/16 finals
Saturday, 9 December 2006	14:00	1/8 finals
Saturday, 9 December 2006	14:00	Quarterfinals
Saturday, 9 December 2006	14:00	Semifinals
Saturday, 9 December 2006	14:00	Final

== Results ==
Legend

- DQ — Won by disqualification
- R — Won by referee stop contest

=== Final ===
Final
Kim Ju-young (KOR)	4
Tshomlee Go (PHI)	1

=== Top half ===
1/16 finals
Kim Ju-young (KOR)	5
Kashif Khan (PAK)	0
Ziaullah Aimal (AFG)	7
Pavel Khan (UZB)	6

1/8 finals
Nacha Punthong (THA)	3
Kim Ju-young (KOR)	7^{R}
Kazim Al-Hassan (PLE)
Khalid Al-Rifai (BRN)	DQ
Vũ Anh Tuấn (VIE)	6
Shahobuddin Saidov (TJK)	2
Ziaullah Aimal (AFG)	5
Thamer Qaitouqah (JOR)	10

Quarterfinals
Kim Ju-young (KOR)	9
Khalid Al-Rifai (BRN)	2
Vũ Anh Tuấn (VIE)	0
Thamer Qaitouqah (JOR)	0

Semifinals
Kim Ju-young (KOR)	7
Vũ Anh Tuấn (VIE)	0

=== Bottom half ===
1/16 finals
Tshomlee Go (PHI)	2
Badralden Al-Muradi (YEM)	0
Said Gafar Salih (QAT)	6
Pun Chi Fai (MAC)	1

1/8 finals
Aman Abykenov (KGZ)	1
Tshomlee Go (PHI)	2
Turki Al-Rashed (KSA)	5
Noel Moukhaiber (LIB)	3
Hani Al-Shammari (KUW)	1
Sanjeev Pradhan (NEP)	0
Said Gafar Salih (QAT)	0
Su Tai-yuan (TPE)	1

Quarterfinals
Tshomlee Go (PHI)	3
Turki Al-Rashed (KSA)	1
Hani Al-Shammari (KUW)	0
Su Tai-yuan (TPE)	1

Semifinals
Tshomlee Go (PHI)	2
Su Tai-yuan (TPE)	1
