= 2008 Asian Taekwondo Championships =

Taekwondo competition

- Venue: The Sports Centre Gymnasium
- Location: Luoyang, China
- Dates: 26–28 April 2008

Champions
- Men: Iran
- Women: China

The 2008 Asian Taekwondo Championships are the 18th edition of the Asian Taekwondo Championships, and were held at The Sports Centre Gymnasium of Luoyang in Luoyang, China from April 26 to April 28, 2008.

== Medal summary ==
=== Men ===
| Event | Gold | Silver | Bronze |
|---|---|---|---|
| Finweight −54 kg | Jerranat Narkaviroj; Thailand | Choi Yeon-ho; South Korea | Tameem Al-Kubati; Yemen |
| Finweight −54 kg | Jerranat Narkaviroj; Thailand | Choi Yeon-ho; South Korea | Japoy Lizardo; Philippines |
| Flyweight −58 kg | Chu Mu-yen; Chinese Taipei | Husam Suleiman; Jordan | Lim Chul-ho; South Korea |
| Flyweight −58 kg | Chu Mu-yen; Chinese Taipei | Husam Suleiman; Jordan | Rohullah Nikpai; Afghanistan |
| Bantamweight −62 kg | Kim Yong-min; South Korea | Reza Naderian; Iran | Nacha Punthong; Thailand |
| Bantamweight −62 kg | Kim Yong-min; South Korea | Reza Naderian; Iran | Zhu Shengpeng; China |
| Featherweight −67 kg | Mohammad Bagheri Motamed; Iran | Mohammad Abulibdeh; Jordan | Kairat Sarymsakov; Kazakhstan |
| Featherweight −67 kg | Mohammad Bagheri Motamed; Iran | Mohammad Abulibdeh; Jordan | Kiyoteru Higuchi; Japan |
| Lightweight −72 kg | Alireza Nasr Azadani; Iran | Tseng Ching-hsiang; Chinese Taipei | Sawatvilay Phimmasone; Laos |
| Lightweight −72 kg | Alireza Nasr Azadani; Iran | Tseng Ching-hsiang; Chinese Taipei | Nabil Talal; Jordan |
| Welterweight −78 kg | Farzad Abdollahi; Iran | Zhu Guo; China | Dam Srichan; Thailand |
| Welterweight −78 kg | Farzad Abdollahi; Iran | Zhu Guo; China | Jang Chang-ha; South Korea |
| Middleweight −84 kg | Kourosh Rajoli; Iran | Yuan Ming-che; Chinese Taipei | Alexander Briones; Philippines |
| Middleweight −84 kg | Kourosh Rajoli; Iran | Yuan Ming-che; Chinese Taipei | Pan Dongdong; China |
| Heavyweight +84 kg | Liu Xiaobo; China | Nguyễn Văn Hùng; Vietnam | Arman Chilmanov; Kazakhstan |
| Heavyweight +84 kg | Liu Xiaobo; China | Nguyễn Văn Hùng; Vietnam | Akmal Irgashev; Uzbekistan |

=== Women ===
| Event | Gold | Silver | Bronze |
|---|---|---|---|
| Finweight −47 kg | Fatemeh Nemati; Iran | Fransisca Valentina; Indonesia | Liao Wei-chun; Chinese Taipei |
| Finweight −47 kg | Fatemeh Nemati; Iran | Fransisca Valentina; Indonesia | Jyra Lizardo; Philippines |
| Flyweight −51 kg | Yang Shu-chun; Chinese Taipei | Wu Jingyu; China | Kwon Eun-kyung; South Korea |
| Flyweight −51 kg | Yang Shu-chun; Chinese Taipei | Wu Jingyu; China | Loraine Catalan; Philippines |
| Bantamweight −55 kg | Lei Jie; China | Nam Jin-ah; South Korea | Tseng Yi-hsuan; Chinese Taipei |
| Bantamweight −55 kg | Lei Jie; China | Nam Jin-ah; South Korea | Tamonrat Pokadhanawat; Thailand |
| Featherweight −59 kg | Su Li-wen; Chinese Taipei | Zarina Shamshatkyzy; Kazakhstan | Watcharaporn Dongnoi; Thailand |
| Featherweight −59 kg | Su Li-wen; Chinese Taipei | Zarina Shamshatkyzy; Kazakhstan | Liu Jing; China |
| Lightweight −63 kg | Park Hye-mi; South Korea | Tseng Pei-hua; Chinese Taipei | Si Hui; China |
| Lightweight −63 kg | Park Hye-mi; South Korea | Tseng Pei-hua; Chinese Taipei | Meera Chettri; India |
| Welterweight −67 kg | Guo Yunfei; China | Toni Rivero; Philippines | Liya Nurkina; Kazakhstan |
| Welterweight −67 kg | Guo Yunfei; China | Toni Rivero; Philippines | Trần Thị Ngọc Trâm; Vietnam |
| Middleweight −72 kg | An Sae-bom; South Korea | Che Chew Chan; Malaysia | Sun Ai-chi; Chinese Taipei |
| Middleweight −72 kg | An Sae-bom; South Korea | Che Chew Chan; Malaysia | Luo Wei; China |
| Heavyweight +72 kg | Chen Zhong; China | Nadin Dawani; Jordan | Soheila Sayyahi; Iran |
| Heavyweight +72 kg | Chen Zhong; China | Nadin Dawani; Jordan | Jang Jung-yoon; South Korea |

== Medal table ==
| Rank | Nation | Gold | Silver | Bronze | Total |
|---|---|---|---|---|---|
| 1 | Iran | 5 | 1 | 1 | 7 |
| 2 | China | 4 | 2 | 5 | 11 |
| 3 | Chinese Taipei | 3 | 3 | 3 | 9 |
| 4 | South Korea | 3 | 2 | 4 | 9 |
| 5 | Thailand | 1 | 0 | 4 | 5 |
| 6 | Jordan | 0 | 3 | 1 | 4 |
| 7 | Philippines | 0 | 1 | 4 | 5 |
| 8 | Kazakhstan | 0 | 1 | 3 | 4 |
| 9 | Vietnam | 0 | 1 | 1 | 2 |
| 10 | Indonesia | 0 | 1 | 0 | 1 |
| 10 | Malaysia | 0 | 1 | 0 | 1 |
| 12 | Afghanistan | 0 | 0 | 1 | 1 |
| 12 | India | 0 | 0 | 1 | 1 |
| 12 | Japan | 0 | 0 | 1 | 1 |
| 12 | Laos | 0 | 0 | 1 | 1 |
| 12 | Uzbekistan | 0 | 0 | 1 | 1 |
| 12 | Yemen | 0 | 0 | 1 | 1 |
| Totals (17 entries) | | 16 | 16 | 32 | 64 |

== Team ranking ==
=== Men ===
| Rank | Team | Points |
|---|---|---|
| 1 | Iran | 59 |
| 2 | China | 31 |
| 3 | South Korea | 30 |
| 4 | Chinese Taipei | 28 |
| 5 | Thailand | 26 |
| 6 | Jordan | 21 |
| 7 | Philippines | 16 |
| 8 | Vietnam | 14 |
| 9 | Kazakhstan | 13 |
| 10 | Japan | 11 |

=== Women ===
| Rank | Team | Points |
|---|---|---|
| 1 | China | 52 |
| 2 | Chinese Taipei | 38 |
| 3 | South Korea | 36 |
| 4 | Iran | 20 |
| 5 | Philippines | 18 |
| 6 | Kazakhstan | 12 |
| 7 | Indonesia | 11 |
| 8 | Thailand | 11 |
| 9 | Malaysia | 9 |
| 10 | Vietnam | 8 |
