= Sawatvilay Phimmasone =

Laotian taekwondo practitioner

Medal record

Men's taekwondo

Representing Laos

Asian Championships
Bronze medal – third place	2008 Luoyang	Lightweight

Southeast Asian Games
Silver medal – second place	2011 Jakarta	Lightweight
Bronze medal – third place	2005 Manila	Lightweight

Sawatvilay Phimmasone (born March 3, 1987) is a Laotian taekwondo practitioner. He won a surprising bronze medal in the men's lightweight (-72 kg) class at the 2008 Asian Taekwondo Championships, upsetting two-time Olympic medalist Song Myeong-Seob of South Korea in the first round.
