= Taekwondo at the 2009 Summer Universiade =

Taekwondo competition

Taekwondo at the XXV Summer Universiade
- Venue: Belgrade Fair
- Dates: July 1, 2009 – July 6, 2009

The Taekwondo competition in the 2009 Summer Universiade were held in Belgrade, Serbia.

== Medal overview ==
=== Men's events ===
Event	Gold	Silver	Bronze
Individual Poomsae	Lee Ki-Sung (KOR)	Nguyen Dinh Toan (VIE)	Shaker Ahmed El-Hamy (EGY)
Individual Poomsae	Lee Ki-Sung (KOR)	Nguyen Dinh Toan (VIE)	Mikel Martinez Del Rio (ESP)
Team Poomsae	South Korea (KOR); Ji Ho-Yong; Lee Ki-Sung; Lee Sang-Mok	Vietnam (VIE); Le Trung Anh; Nguyen Dinh Toan; Vu Thanh Duong	Egypt (EGY); Shaker Ahmed El-Hamy; Karim El-Araby; Abdel-Fattah Ahmed
Team Poomsae	South Korea (KOR); Ji Ho-Yong; Lee Ki-Sung; Lee Sang-Mok	Vietnam (VIE); Le Trung Anh; Nguyen Dinh Toan; Vu Thanh Duong	Iran (IRI); Sina Khalash; Ali Nadali; Hamid Nazari
Under 54 kg	Cheon Yong (KOR)	Remzi Başakbuğday (TUR)	Cheng Chia-Ching (TPE)
Under 54 kg	Cheon Yong (KOR)	Remzi Başakbuğday (TUR)	Chutchawal Khawlaor (THA)
Under 58 kg	Moon Kil-Sang (KOR)	Ninoslav Babić (SRB)	Onur Cam (TUR)
Under 58 kg	Moon Kil-Sang (KOR)	Ninoslav Babić (SRB)	Kengo Uchimura (JPN)
Under 62 kg	Rafik Zohri (NED)	Kim Taek-Kyu (KOR)	Dmitry Frank (RUS)
Under 62 kg	Rafik Zohri (NED)	Kim Taek-Kyu (KOR)	Stevan Rašić (SRB)
Under 67 kg	Diogo Silva (BRA)	Lee Soon-Kil (KOR)	Terrence Jennings (USA)
Under 67 kg	Diogo Silva (BRA)	Lee Soon-Kil (KOR)	Thanawut Klinkhachon (THA)
Under 72 kg	Alireza Nasr Azadani (IRI)	Torann Maizeroi (FRA)	Sebastian Lehmann (GER)
Under 72 kg	Alireza Nasr Azadani (IRI)	Torann Maizeroi (FRA)	Patiwat Thongsalap (THA)
Under 78 kg	Rouhollah Talebi (IRI)	Sergey Dozortsev (RUS)	Baek Sun-Hong (KOR)
Under 78 kg	Rouhollah Talebi (IRI)	Sergey Dozortsev (RUS)	Arman Yeremyan (ARM)
Under 84 kg	Mehran Askari (IRI)	Ivan Nikitin (RUS)	Ihar Rasakhatski (BLR)
Under 84 kg	Mehran Askari (IRI)	Ivan Nikitin (RUS)	Serdar Yüksel (TUR)
Over 84 kg	Roman Kuznetsov (RUS)	Hossein Tajik (IRI)	Salvador Pérez (MEX)
Over 84 kg	Roman Kuznetsov (RUS)	Hossein Tajik (IRI)	Robert Vossen (GER)

=== Women's events ===
Event	Gold	Silver	Bronze
Individual Poomsae	Laura Kim (ESP)	Hwang Cho-Rong (KOR)	Ammar Rohanda El-Said (EGY)
Individual Poomsae	Laura Kim (ESP)	Hwang Cho-Rong (KOR)	Stefania Pinga (ITA)
Team Poomsae	South Korea (KOR); Ahn Jin-Young; Hwang Cho-Rong; Lee Han-Na	China (CHN); Feng Lu; Xie Xiao; Zhang Lisha	Mexico (MEX); Iliana González; Ollin Medina; Sahra Padilla
Team Poomsae	South Korea (KOR); Ahn Jin-Young; Hwang Cho-Rong; Lee Han-Na	China (CHN); Feng Lu; Xie Xiao; Zhang Lisha	Serbia (SRB); Nataša Bajić; Sanja Kopcanski; Marijana Suzuković
Under 47 kg	Park Hyo-Ji (KOR)	Zhang Qiang (CHN)	Kristina Kim (RUS)
Under 47 kg	Park Hyo-Ji (KOR)	Zhang Qiang (CHN)	Ting Ju-Yi (TPE)
Under 51 kg	Manuela Bezzola (SUI)	Yang Shu-Chun (TPE)	Janete Alegria (MEX)
Under 51 kg	Manuela Bezzola (SUI)	Yang Shu-Chun (TPE)	Chanatip Sonkham (THA)
Under 55 kg	Tseng Yi-Hsuan (TPE)	Wu Qiong (CHN)	Nam Jin-Ah (KOR)
Under 55 kg	Tseng Yi-Hsuan (TPE)	Wu Qiong (CHN)	Sarita Pongsri (THA)
Under 59 kg	Jung Jin-Hee (KOR)	Tseng Pei-Hua (TPE)	Pamela Valente (ITA)
Under 59 kg	Jung Jin-Hee (KOR)	Tseng Pei-Hua (TPE)	Martina Zubčić (CRO)
Under 63 kg	Estefanía Hernández (ESP)	Premwaew Chonnapas (THA)	Chang Chiung-Fang (TPE)
Under 63 kg	Estefanía Hernández (ESP)	Premwaew Chonnapas (THA)	Marlene Harnois (FRA)
Under 67 kg	Gulnafis Aitmukhambetova (KAZ)	Petra Matijašević (CRO)	Maria Chugaeva (RUS)
Under 67 kg	Gulnafis Aitmukhambetova (KAZ)	Petra Matijašević (CRO)	Lee Seon-Hyeong (KOR)
Under 72 kg	Gwladys Épangue (FRA)	Oh Hye-Ri (KOR)	Reshmie Oogink (NED)
Under 72 kg	Gwladys Épangue (FRA)	Oh Hye-Ri (KOR)	Andrijana Ćirić (SRB)
Over 72 kg	Natália Falavigna (BRA)	Han Yingying (CHN)	Büşra Yıldız (TUR)
Over 72 kg	Natália Falavigna (BRA)	Han Yingying (CHN)	Rapatkorn Prasopsuk (THA)

=== Mixed events ===
Event	Gold	Silver	Bronze
Pair Poomsae	Spain (ESP); Laura Kim; Mikel Martinez Del Rio	China (CHN); Deng Yan; Guo Yan	South Korea (KOR); Ahn Jin-Young; Lee Sang-Mok
Pair Poomsae	Spain (ESP); Laura Kim; Mikel Martinez Del Rio	China (CHN); Deng Yan; Guo Yan	Vietnam (VIE); Le Trung Anh; Nguyen Thi Thu Ngan

== Medal table ==
Rank	Nation	Gold	Silver	Bronze	Total
1	South Korea (KOR)	7	4	4	15
2	Iran (IRI)	3	1	1	5
3	Spain (ESP)	3	0	1	4
4	Brazil (BRA)	2	0	0	2
5	Chinese Taipei (TPE)	1	2	3	6
5	Russia (RUS)	1	2	3	6
7	France (FRA)	1	1	1	3
8	Netherlands (NED)	1	0	1	2
9	Kazakhstan (KAZ)	1	0	0	1
9	Switzerland (SUI)	1	0	0	1
11	China (CHN)	0	5	0	5
12	Vietnam (VIE)	0	2	1	3
13	Thailand (THA)	0	1	6	7
14	Serbia (SRB)	0	1	3	4
14	Turkey (TUR)	0	1	3	4
16	Croatia (CRO)	0	1	1	2
17	Egypt (EGY)	0	0	3	3
17	Mexico (MEX)	0	0	3	3
19	Germany (GER)	0	0	2	2
19	Italy (ITA)	0	0	2	2
21	Armenia (ARM)	0	0	1	1
21	Belarus (BLR)	0	0	1	1
21	Japan (JPN)	0	0	1	1
21	United States (USA)	0	0	1	1
Totals (24 entries)		21	21	42	84
