= 2010 European Taekwondo Championships =

Taekwondo competition

- Venue: Yubileyny Sports Palace
- Location: Saint Petersburg, Russia
- Start date: 12 May
- End date: 15 May

The 2010 European Taekwondo Championships was held at the Yubileyny Sports Palace in Saint Petersburg, Russia, from May 12 to May 15, 2010.

== Medal table ==
* Host nation (Russia)

Rank	Nation	Gold	Silver	Bronze	Total
1	Turkey	3	2	1	6
2	France	2	3	4	9
3	Russia*	2	1	4	7
4	Spain	2	1	2	5
5	Great Britain	2	0	2	4
6	Germany	1	1	4	6
7	Croatia	1	1	1	3
8	Azerbaijan	1	0	1	2
8	Israel	1	0	1	2
8	Italy	1	0	1	2
11	Greece	0	2	2	4
12	Sweden	0	1	1	2
12	Ukraine	0	1	1	2
14	Austria	0	1	0	1
14	Denmark	0	1	0	1
14	Serbia	0	1	0	1
17	Netherlands	0	0	2	2
17	Poland	0	0	2	2
19	Moldova	0	0	1	1
19	Slovenia	0	0	1	1
19	Switzerland	0	0	1	1
Totals (21 entries)		16	16	32	64

== Medal summary ==
=== Men ===
Event	Gold	Silver	Bronze
−54 kg (fin)	Seyfula Magomedov (RUS)	Remzi Başakbuğday (TUR)	Moti Lugasi (ISR); Sergej Kolb (GER)
−58 kg (fly)	Joel González (ESP)	Alan Nogaev (RUS)	Stipe Jarloni (CRO); Marios Tsourdinis (GRE)
−63 kg (bantam)	Konstantinos Konstantinidis (GER)	Nikola Jovanović (SRB)	Vladislav Arventil (MDA); Cem Uluğnuyan (TUR)
−68 kg (feather)	Servet Tazegül (TUR)	Filip Grgic (CRO)	Dennis Bekkers (NLD); Vasily Nikitin (RUS)
−74 kg (light)	Rıdvan Baygut (TUR)	Manuel Mark (AUT)	Mokdad Ounis (GER); Elvin Mammadov (AZE)
−80 kg (welter)	Aaron Cook (GBR)	Nikolaos Tzellos (GRE)	Mamedy Doucara (FRA); Lukasz Smigaj (POL)
−87 kg (middle)	Carlo Molfetta (ITA)	Agustin Bata (FRA)	Jon García Aguado (ESP); Ivan Nikitin (RUS)
+87 kg (heavy)	Tavakkul Bayramov (AZE)	Zakaria Asidah (DEN)	Mickael Borot (FRA); Alexandros Nikolaidis (GRE)

=== Women ===
Event	Gold	Silver	Bronze
−46 kg (fin)	Rukiye Yıldırım (TUR)	Elaia Torrontegui Ronco (ESP)	Yuliya Volkova (UKR); Sumeyye Karaahmet (GER)
−49 kg (fly)	Lucija Zaninovic (CRO)	Yasmina Aziez (FRA)	Kristina Kim (RUS); Hanna Zajc (SWE)
−53 kg (bantam)	Floriane Liborio (FRA)	Jennifer Ågren (SWE)	Jade Jones (GBR); Manuela Bezzola (SUI)
−57 kg (feather)	Bat-El Gatterer (ISR)	Yuliya Podolyan (UKR)	Deborah Louz (NLD); Veronica Calabrese (ITA)
−62 kg (light)	Haby Niare (FRA)	Margarita Michailidou (GRE)	Kristina Khafizova (RUS); Estefania Hernandez Garcia (ESP)
−67 kg (welter)	Sarah Stevenson (GBR)	Nur Tatar (TUR)	Helena Fromm (GER); Marlene Harnois (FRA)
−73 kg (middle)	Anastasia Baryshnikova (RUS)	Sandra Lorenzo Rodelas (GER)	Nusa Rajher (SLO); Gwladys Épangue (FRA)
+73 kg (heavy)	Rosana Simon Alamo (ESP)	Anne Caroline Graffe (FRA)	Iwona Kosiorek (POL); Bianca Walkden (GBR)
