= Taekwondo at the 2006 Asian Games – Women's 51 kg =

Taekwondo competition

Women's 51 kg at the 2006 Asian Games
- Venue: Qatar SC Indoor Hall
- Date: 8 December 2006
- Competitors: 18 from 18 nations

Medalists
gold medal	Kwon Eun-kyung	South Korea
silver medal	Wu Yen-ni	Chinese Taipei
bronze medal	Đỗ Thị Bích Hạnh	Vietnam
bronze medal	Natthaya Sangsasiton	Thailand

The women's flyweight (−51 kilograms) event at the 2006 Asian Games took place on 8 December 2006 at Qatar SC Indoor Hall, Doha, Qatar.

== Schedule ==
All times are Arabia Standard Time (UTC+03:00)

Date	Time	Event
Friday, 8 December 2006	14:00	1/16 finals
Friday, 8 December 2006	14:00	1/8 finals
Friday, 8 December 2006	14:00	Quarterfinals
Friday, 8 December 2006	14:00	Semifinals
Friday, 8 December 2006	14:00	Final

== Results ==
Legend

- DQ — Won by disqualification

=== Final ===
Final
Wu Yen-ni (TPE)	0
Kwon Eun-kyung (KOR)	2

=== Top half ===
1/16 finals
Sara Khoshjamal Fekri (IRI)	6
Elyse Chakar (LIB)	1

1/8 finals
Wang Ying (CHN)	2
Sara Khoshjamal Fekri (IRI)	3
Đỗ Thị Bích Hạnh (VIE)	1
Nila Ahmadi (AFG)	−1
Sonam Gaki (BHU)	2
Hadeel Fawzy (QAT)	0
Loraine Catalan (PHI)	0
Wu Yen-ni (TPE)	0

Quarterfinals
Sara Khoshjamal Fekri (IRI)	1
Đỗ Thị Bích Hạnh (VIE)	3
Sonam Gaki (BHU)	0
Wu Yen-ni (TPE)	4

Semifinals
Đỗ Thị Bích Hạnh (VIE)	2
Wu Yen-ni (TPE)	2

=== Bottom half ===
1/16 finals
Kwon Eun-kyung (KOR)	3
Nazgul Tazhigulova (KAZ)	1

1/8 finals
Chhoeung Puthearim (CAM)	1
Ai Yamaji (JPN)	2
Padma Gurung (NEP)	2
Natthaya Sangsasiton (THA)	6
Priyangika Gomes (SRI)	1
Gulchehra Rahimova (TJK)	7
Kwon Eun-kyung (KOR)	DQ
Kawthar Al-Naser (KUW)

Quarterfinals
Ai Yamaji (JPN)	0
Natthaya Sangsasiton (THA)	3
Gulchehra Rahimova (TJK)	1
Kwon Eun-kyung (KOR)	3

Semifinals
Natthaya Sangsasiton (THA)	3
Kwon Eun-kyung (KOR)	6
