= Kwon Eun-kyung =

South Korean taekwondo practitioner

Personal information
- Nationality: South Korean
- Born: 10 July 1985 (age 40)

Sport
- Sport: Taekwondo
Medal record
Representing South Korea
Women's taekwondo
World Championships
Bronze medal – third place	2009 Copenhagen	Bantamweight
Asian Championships
Gold medal – first place	2006 Bangkok	-51 kg
Bronze medal – third place	2008 Henan	-51 kg
Asian Games
Gold medal – first place	2006 Doha	-51 kg
Bronze medal – third place	2010 Guangzhou	-53 kg

Kwon Eun-kyung (born 10 July 1985) is a South Korean taekwondo practitioner.

She won a bronze medal in bantamweight at the 2009 World Taekwondo Championships. Her achievements at the Asian Championships include a gold medal in 2006, and a bronze medal in 2008. She won a gold medal at the 2006 Asian Games, and a bronze medal at the 2010 Asian Games.
