= Manuela Bezzola =

Swiss taekwondo practitioner

Personal information
- Nationality: Switzerland
- Born: 12 August 1989 (age 36)
- Height: 1.64 m (5 ft 4 1/2 in)
- Weight: 49 kg (108 lb)

Sport
- Sport: Taekwondo
- Event: 49 kg
Medal record
Women's taekwondo
Representing Switzerland
Universiade
Gold medal – first place	2009 Belgrade	51 kg
European Championships
Bronze medal – third place	2010 St. Petersburg	53 kg

Manuela Bezzola (born 12 August 1989) is a Swiss taekwondo practitioner. She defeated Chinese Taipei's Yang Shu-Chun for the gold medal in the women's 51 kg division at the 2009 Summer Universiade in Belgrade, Serbia. She also captured a bronze medal in the bantamweight division (53 kg) at the 2010 European Taekwondo Championships in St. Petersburg, Russia.

Bezzola qualified for the women's 49 kg class at the 2008 Summer Olympics in Beijing, after placing second in the European Qualification Tournament in Istanbul, Turkey. She lost the preliminary round of sixteen match to Charlotte Craig of the United States.
