= Moti Lugasi =

Israeli taekwondo practitioner

Medal record

Representing Israel

Men's taekwondo

2010 European Taekwondo Championships
Bronze medal – third place	2010 Saint Petersburg	54 kg

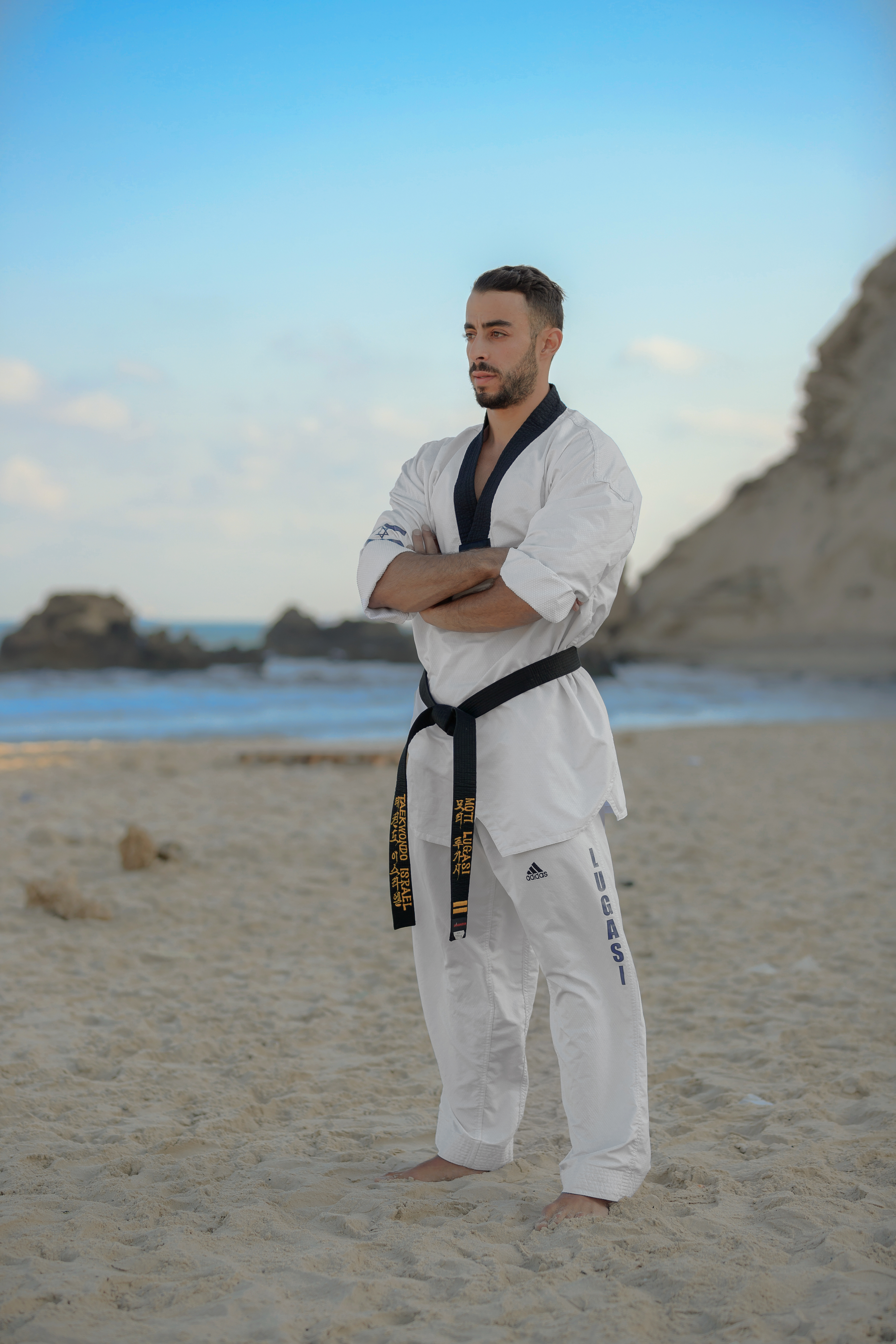
Moti lugasi pro athlete.

Moti Lugasi (Hebrew: מוטי לוגסי; born April 18, 1992) is an Israeli taekwondo athlete. He won a bronze medal at the age of 18 in the 54 kg (fin) class at the 2010 European Taekwondo Championships.
