= Yvette Yong =

Canadian taekwondo practitioner

Personal information
- Born: 9 March 1990 (age 36) Vancouver, Canada

Sport
- Sport: Taekwondo
Medal record
Women's taekwondo
Representing Canada
World Taekwondo Championships
Bronze medal – third place	2009 Copenhagen	46 kg

Yvette Hui Hua Yong (born 9 March 1990) is a Canadian taekwondo practitioner.

== Career ==
She is a former World Championships bronze medallist. In 2015, she was named to Canada's team at the 2015 Pan American Games to be held in Toronto.

Yong competed at the 2019 Pan American Games losing in the quarter-finals.

In July 2021, Yong was named to Canada's 2020 Olympic team. At the 2020 Summer Olympics, she placed joint eleventh in the women's <49kg division.
