= Ana Zaninović =

Croatian taekwondo practitioner

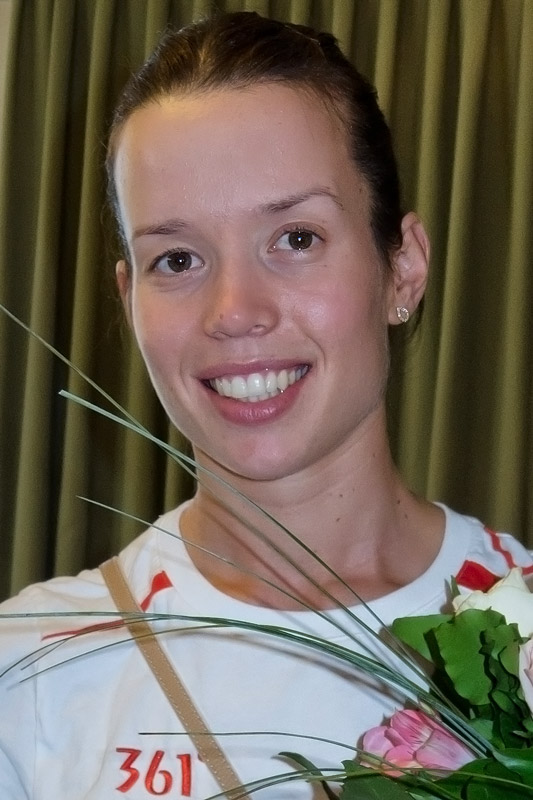

Personal information
- Born: 26 June 1987 (age 39) Split, SR Croatia, SFR Yugoslavia
- Height: 1.73 m (5 ft 8 in)

Sport
- Country: Croatia
- Sport: Taekwondo
- Event: Bantamweight (-53 kg)
- Club: Marjan Taekwondo Club
- Coached by: Toni Tomas
Medal record
Representing Croatia
Women's taekwondo
World Championships
Gold medal – first place	2011 Gyeongju	Bantamweight
Silver medal – second place	2007 Beijing	Flyweight
Silver medal – second place	2013 Puebla	Bantamweight
Bronze medal – third place	2015 Chelyabinsk	Bantamweight
European Championships
Gold medal – first place	2014 Baku	Bantamweight
Silver medal – second place	2012 Manchester	Bantamweight
European Games
Silver medal – second place	2015 Baku	57 kg

Ana Zaninović (born 26 June 1987, in Split) is a Croatian taekwondo practitioner. She is the twin sister of taekwondo practitioner Lucija Zaninović.

At the 2007 World Taekwondo Championships in Beijing, Zaninović won the silver medal in the women's flyweight class. Zaninović won the gold medal in the women's bantamweight class at the 2011 World Taekwondo Championships in Gyeongju. Zaninović qualified for the 2012 Summer Olympics after winning the bronze medal in the women's 57 kg class at the 2011 World Taekwondo Olympic Qualification Tournament held in Baku. She defeated Mayu Hamada in a match in which Zaninović suffered a broken fist in the third round but held on and won with the golden point in the fourth overtime round. At the 2012 European Taekwondo Championships in Manchester, she won the silver medal in the women's bantamweight class after losing to Hatice Kübra Yangın in the sudden death round. At the 2012 Summer Olympics, she was defeated in the preliminary round by Mayu Hamada.
