= Yeom Hyo-seob =

South Korean taekwondo practitioner

Medal record

Representing South Korea

Men's taekwondo

World Championships
Gold medal – first place	2009 Copenhagen	Bantamweight

Yeom Hyo-Seob (Korean: 염효섭) is a South Korean taekwondo practitioner. He won the gold medal in the bantamweight division (-63 kg) at the 2009 World Taekwondo Championships in Copenhagen, Denmark.

== Controversial final ==
At the 2009 World Championship, Yeom won the very controversial gold medal fight against Reza Naderian of Iran following a highly disputed 4–2 final score. Yeom was trailing 2-1 midway through the second round when the judge gave three points to Yeom for a kick to the face that did not connect. Iran requested a video replay but the referee refused. Then in the third round, with Yeom ahead by a point, the referee accepted team Korea's request for a video replay and took away a point from the Iranian fighter. Yeom kept clinching the Iranian opponent using fake attacks until the end of the third round, and even ran out on the mat when 5 seconds are left to the end of the match. After the match, many South Korean media criticized about the controversial judgement and Yeom's unsportsmanlike ending.
