= Park Hyo-ji =

South Korean taekwondo practitioner

Park Hyo-Ji
Personal information
- Born: October 23, 1988 (age 37) Incheon, South Korea
Medal record
Representing South Korea
Women's taekwondo
World Championships
Gold medal – first place	2009 Copenhagen	Finweight
Universiade
Gold medal – first place	2009 Belgrade	Finweight

Park Hyo-Ji (Korean: 박효지, born October 23, 1988, in Incheon) is a South Korean female taekwondo practitioner.

== Career ==
In 2007, she was selected as a member of the South Korean national taekwondo team and competed in the 2007 World Taekwondo Championships, but lost to Charlotte Craig of the United States in Round of 32.

In July 2009, Park won the gold medal in finweight (-47 kg) at the Summer Universiade in Belgrade, Serbia. On October 17, she won the gold medal in finweight (-46 kg) at the 2009 World Taekwondo Championships in Copenhagen, Denmark.
