= Audy Muller =

Personal information
- Nationality: Netherlands Antilles
- Born: May 29, 1985 (age 41)

Sport
- Sport: Taekwondo

Audy Muller is an Antillean athlete who competes in taekwondo. He won two medals in the Pan American Taekwondo Championship in 2008 and 2010.

== International wins ==
Pan American Championship
Year	Location	Medal	Category
2008	Caguas (Puerto Rico)	Gold	–54 kg
2010	Monterrey (Mexico)	Bronze	–54 kg
