= Hatice Kübra Yangın =

Turkish taekwondo practitioner

Personal information
- Nationality: Turkish
- Born: August 15, 1989 (age 36) Kütahya, Turkey

Sport
- Country: Turkey
- Sport: Taekwondo
- Event: Bantamweight
- Club: Kocaeli BB Kağıt S.K.
Medal record
World Championships
Bronze medal – third place	2011 Gyeongju	Bantamweight
European Championships
Gold medal – first place	2012 Manchester	Bantamweight
Gold medal – first place	2008 Rome	Bantamweight
Summer Universiade
Gold medal – first place	2011 Shenzhen	Bantamweight

Hatice Kübra Yangın (born August 15, 1989 in Kütahya) is a Turkish female taekwondo practitioner competing in the bantamweight division. She is a member of the Kocaeli BB Kağıt S.K. in Izmit.

She began with taekwondo at the age of 13 in Eskişehir, where her father is an employee of the province's sports office. Her sister Gamze is also a national taekwondo practitioner.

Hatice Kübra Yangın became champion at the 2008 European Taekwondo Championships. She won a bronze medal at the 2011 World Taekwondo Championships held in Gyeongju, South Korea. The same year Yangın won the gold medal at the 2011 Summer Universiade. In 2012, she regained her champion title at the 2012 European Taekwondo Championships.

== Achievements ==
Year	Competition	Venue	Position	Event	Notes
Representing Turkey
2008	European Championships	Rome, Italy	1st place, gold medalist(s)	-55 kg	April 10–13
2011	World Championships	Gyeongju, South Korea	3rd place, bronze medalist(s)	-53 kg	May 1–6
2011	Summer Universiade	Shenzhen, China	1st place, gold medalist(s)	-53 kg	August 18–23
2012	European Championships	Manchester, England	1st place, gold medalist(s)	-55 kg	May 3–6
