= Lamyaa Bekkali =

Moroccan taekwondo practitioner

Personal information
- Nationality: Moroccan
- Born: 10 May 1989 (age 37)

Sport
- Sport: Taekwondo
Medal record
Representing Morocco
Women's taekwondo
World Championships
Silver medal – second place	2011 Gyeongju	Bantamweight
African Championships
Gold medal – first place	2009 Yaounde	-53 kg
Gold medal – first place	2010 Tripoli	-53 kg
Bronze medal – third place	2014 Tunis	-53 kg

Lamyaa Bekkali (born 10 May 1989) is a Moroccan taekwondo practitioner.

She won a silver medal in bantamweight at the 2011 World Taekwondo Championships, after being defeated by Ana Zaninović in the final. Her achievements at the African Taekwondo Championships include gold medals in 2009 and 2010, and a bronze medal in 2014.
