= Caroline Maher =

Egyptian politician

Caroline Maher (Arabic: كارولين ماهر) is a member of the Egyptian Parliament. She is a taekwondo player.
