= Seyfula Magomedov =

Russian taekwondo practitioner

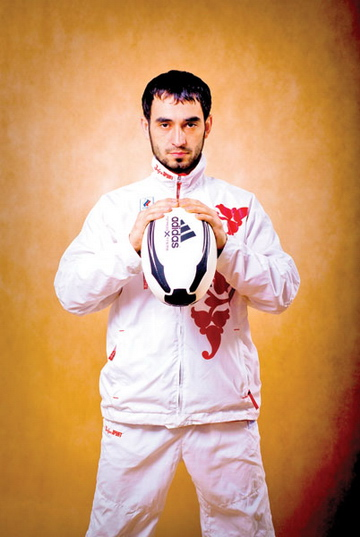

Personal information
- Full name: Seyfula Seferovich Magomedov
- Nationality: Rutulian (Russia)
- Born: 15 May 1983 (age 43) Makhachkala, Dagestan ASSR, Soviet Union
- Height: 1.68 m (5 ft 6 in)
- Weight: 58 kg (128 lb)

Sport
- Sport: Taekwondo
- Event: 58 kg
Medal record
Men's taekwondo
Representing Russia
Summer Universiade
Gold medal – first place	2005 İzmir	−58 kg
World Championships
Bronze medal – third place	2005 Madrid	Finweight (−54 kg)
Bronze medal – third place	2011 Gyeongju	Finweight (−54 kg)
European Championships
Gold medal – first place	2006 Bonn	−54 kg
Gold medal – first place	2008 Rome	−54 kg
Gold medal – first place	2010 Saint Petersburg	−54 kg
Gold medal – first place	2012 Manchester	−54 kg
Silver medal – second place	2004 Lillehammer	−54 kg
Bronze medal – third place	2002 Samsun	−54 kg
Bronze medal – third place	2005 Riga	−54 kg

Seyfula Seferovich Magomedov (Russian: Сейфула Сеферович Магомедов; born May 15, 1983, in Makhachkala, Dagestan ASSR) is a Russian taekwondo practitioner, who competed in the men's flyweight category, the first ever four-time European Taekwondo Champion. Emerging as Russia's most decorated taekwondo player of all time, Magomedov accrued a set of twenty-one medals in his sporting career, including four European men's flyweight titles, three bronzes from the World Championships, and a single gold from the 2005 Summer Universiade in İzmir, Turkey. Magomedov was also selected to compete for the Russian taekwondo team at the 2004 Summer Olympics in Athens, where he finished only in the opening round of the men's 58-kg division.

== Career ==
Magomedov qualified for the Russian squad in the men's flyweight class (58 kg) at the 2004 Summer Olympics in Athens. Earlier in the process, he boosted a gold-medal victory over Great Britain's Paul Green to secure his place on the Russian team from the European Olympic Qualifying Tournament in Baku, Azerbaijan, before his British rival sought revenge on him to a vicious defeat at the European Championships in Lillehammer, Norway a few months later. Magomedov missed his chance to reinstate another glory over Green for the quarterfinal match, after crashing out in a disgraceful 10–12 defeat to Vietnam's Nguyễn Quốc Huân in the opening round. With his Vietnamese opponent losing the semifinals to Mexico's Óscar Salazar, Magomedov shortened his hopes to aim for Russia's first Olympic taekwondo medal in the repechage.

In 2005, Magomedov improved from his ill-fated Olympic feat to strike Iran's Majid Sajjadi with a 5–1 record for his first ever career gold medal in the 54-kg division at the Summer Universiade in İzmir, Turkey, adding this accolade to two bronzes each from the World and European Championships. The following year, he reached the summit of his sporting career by obtaining his first European men's flyweight title in Bonn, Germany, defeating his Azerbaijani opponent Zahid Mammadov.

Magomedov sought a bid on his second debut for the 2008 Summer Olympics in Beijing, but he fell behind Portugal's Pedro Povoa in the quarterfinal match at the European Olympic Qualifying Tournament in Istanbul, Turkey.

At the 2011 World Taekwondo Championships in Gyeongju, South Korea, Magomedov lost the semifinal match 5–7 to Thailand's Chutchawal Khawlaor in the men's finweight division, but had to settle only for the bronze medal on the Russian taekwondo team. Despite missing out a bid for the 2012 Summer Olympics on his second attempt, Magomedov managed to defend his gold medal for the fourth straight time in the 54-kg division at the European Championships in Manchester, United Kingdom.
