= Kourosh Rajoli =

Iranian taekwondo practitioner

Kourosh Rajoli (born January 19, 1985) is an Iranian taekwondo athlete. He is a double gold medalist at the Asian Taekwondo Championships and a bronze medalist at the 2011 World Taekwondo Championships. In the 2006 Asian Taekwondo Championships's final, he defeated Choi Seong-Ho and in the 2008 Asian Taekwondo Championships's final, he overcame Yuan Ming-Che.
