= Lee Hye-young (taekwondo) =

South Korean taekwondo practitioner

Personal information
- Nationality: South Korean
- Born: 30 July 1982 (age 43)

Sport
- Sport: Taekwondo
Medal record
Representing South Korea
Women's taekwondo
World Championships
Gold medal – first place	2001 Jeju	Flyweight
Bronze medal – third place	2011 Gyeongju	Bantamweight
Asian Championships
Gold medal – first place	2006 Bangkok	Bantamweight

Lee Hye-young (born 30 July 1982) is a South Korean taekwondo practitioner.

She won a gold medal in flyweight at the 2001 World Taekwondo Championships in Jeju City, and a bronze medal in bantamweight at the 2011 World Taekwondo Championships in Gyeongju. She won a gold medal at the 2006 Asian Taekwondo Championships in Bangkok.
