= Zoraida Santiago (taekwondo) =

Puerto Rican taekwondo practitioner

Personal information
- Born: June 22, 1982 (age 44) Salinas, Puerto Rico

Sport
- Sport: Taekwondo
Medal record
Representing Puerto Rico
World Championships
Silver medal – second place	2009 Copenhagen	Flyweight
Pan American Games
Bronze medal – third place	2007 Rio de Janeiro	Flyweight

Zoraida Santiago (born June 22, 1982) is a Puerto Rican who medaled in taekwondo at the 2007 Pan American Games.
