= Jennifer Ågren =

Swedish Taekwondo practitioner

Medal record

Representing Sweden

Women's Taekwondo

European Championships
Silver medal – second place	2010 St. Petersburg	53 kg (bantam)

Youth Olympic Games
Bronze medal – third place	2010 Singapore	55 kg

Jennifer Ågren (born 5 January 1993 in Västerbotten, Sweden) is a female Swedish Taekwondo practitioner.
