= Remzi Başakbuğday =

Turkish taekwondo practitioner

Personal information
- Nationality: Turkish
- Born: November 13, 1989 (age 36) Konak, İzmir, Turkey

Sport
- Country: Turkey
- Sport: Taekwondo
- Event: Finweight (-54 kg)
- Club: İzmir Büyükşehir Belediyesi SK
- Coached by: Suat Hastürk
Medal record
Representing Turkey
Men's Taekwondo
European Championships
Silver medal – second place	2010 Saint Petersburg	Finrweight
Universiade
Silver medal – second place	2009 Belgrade	Finrweight

Remzi Başakbuğday (born November 13, 1989) is a Turkish taekwondo practitioner competing in the Finweight ( -54 kg) class.

== Personal life ==
Remzi Başakbuğday was born in Konak, Izmir, Turkey on November 13, 1989. He studied physical education and sports at the Dokuz Eylül University in Izmir. He works as a DJ.

On November 13, 2010, at his 21st birthday, he married Zeynep Kirez (born 1989), also a successful national taekwondo practitioner.

== Sport career ==
He began with taekwondo in 1995 inspired by his maternal uncle Mert Tuncer, the 1998 and 2002 European taekwondo champion. He transferred in his early years from Altay S.K. to Kimdoman SK, and finally to the İzmir Büyükşehir Belediyesi SK, where he competed in the youth and junior categories. He is still a member of the Izmir B.B. SK and is coached by Suat Hastürk. Başakbuğday became more than 15 times Turkish national champion in his sports career.

At the 2009 Universiade in Belgrade, Serbia, Başakbuğday became the silver medalist. He won the silver medal at the 2010 European Taekwondo Championships held in Saint Petersburg, Russia.

== Achievements ==
- (bronze) 2008 Student World Championships - Belgrade, Serbia -54 kg
- (silver) 2008 A-Class Croatia Open - Zagreb, Croatia -54 kg
- (silver) 2009 Universiade - Belgrade, Serbia -54 kg
- (gold) 2009 Under 21 European Championships - Vigo, Spain -54 kg junior
- (gold) 2009 World Cup Taekwondo Team Championships - Baku, Azerbaijan team -54 kg
- (gold) 2010 A-Class Dutch Open - Eindhoven, Netherlands -54 kg
- (silver) 2010 European Championships - Saint Petersburg, Russia -54 kg
- (silver) 2013 1st European Taekwondo Clubs Championships - Athens, Greece - club (-58 kg)
