= Nikola Jovanović (taekwondo) =

Serbian taekwondo practitioner (born 1990)

Medal record

Men's taekwondo

Representing Serbia

European Championships
Silver medal – second place	2010 Saint Petersburg	-63kg

Nikola Jovanović (Serbian: Никола Јовановић, born January 26, 1990) is a Serbian taekwondo athlete.

He won a silver medal at the 2010 European Taekwondo Championships.
