= Cem Uluğnuyan =

Turkish taekwondo practitioner

Personal information
- Nationality: Turkish
- Born: December 18, 1989 (age 36)

Sport
- Country: Turkey
- Sport: Taekwondo
- Event: Bantamweight
- Club: Ankara PTT S.K.
Medal record
World Championships
Bronze medal – third place	2009 Copenhagen	Bantamweight
World Cup Team Championships
Gold medal – first place	2009 Baku	Team
European Taekwondo Championships
Bronze medal – third place	2010 St. Petersburg	Bantamweight
U-21 European Championships
Gold medal – first place	2009 Vigo	Bantamweight

Cem Uluğnuyan (born December 12, 1989) is a Turkish taekwondo practitioner competing in the bantamweight division. He transferred to Ankara PTT S.K. from İzmir Büyükşehir Belediye S.K.

Cem Uluğnuyan was a member of the Turkey national team, which became world champion at the 2009 World Cup Team Championships held in Baku, Azerbaijan. He won the bronze medal at the 2009 World Taekwondo Championships held in Copenhagen, Denmark. The same year, he became European champion at the U-21 European Championships held in Vigo, Spain. At the 2010 European Championships held in Saint Petersburg, Russia, he won the bronze medal in bantamweight division.
