= Samaneh Sheshpari =

Iranian taekwondo practitioner

Personal information
- Native name: سمانه شش‌پری
- Born: 1 September 1987 (age 38) Tehran, Iran

Sport
- Country: Iran
- Sport: Taekwondo
- Weight class: 53 kg
Medal record
Women's taekwondo
Representing Iran
Asian Games
Bronze medal – third place	2010 Guangzhou	53 kg
Asian Championships
Silver medal – second place	2010 Astana	53 kg
Silver medal – second place	2012 Ho Chi Minh City	53 kg
Islamic Solidarity Games
Silver medal – second place	2013 Palembang	53 kg

Samaneh Sheshpari (Persian: سمانه شش‌پری, born 1 September 1987) is a retired Iranian taekwondo practitioner. She won one of the bronze medals in the women's 53 kg event at the 2010 Asian Games held in Guangzhou, China.

== Career ==
In 2014, she competed in the women's 57 kg event at the Asian Games held in Incheon, South Korea without winning a medal.

She won the silver medal in the women's 53 kg event at the Asian Taekwondo Championships both in 2010 and in 2012. In 2013, she won the silver medal in this event at the Islamic Solidarity Games in Palembang, Indonesia.
