= Meisam Bagheri =

Iranian taekwondo practitioner

Personal information
- Full name: Meisam bagheri dehcheshme
- National team: Iran Taekwondo national team
- Born: 18 April 1991 (age 35) Karaj, Iran
- Height: 175 cm (5 ft 9 in)
- Weight: 54 kg (119 lb)

Sport
- Country: Iran
- Sport: Taekwondo
- Team: Iran
Medal record
Representing Iran
World Championships
Bronze medal – third place	2009 Copenhagen	Finweight
Bronze medal – third place	2011 Gyeongju	Finweight
Gold medal – first place	2010 China WorldCup	-54 kg

Meisam Bagheri (Persian میثم باقری) is an Iranian taekwondo athlete born on 18 April 1991 in Karaj.

He won a bronze medal at the 2009 World Taekwondo Championships in Copenhagen, Denmark, in the men's finweight. At the 2011 World Taekwondo Championships in Gyeongju, South Korea, he again won a bronze medal in the men's finweight.

Some of his honors: Bronze Asian Championship 2007 Bahrain International Gold 2008 2009 Baku World Cup silver 2009 Asian Club Cup Silver Bronze World Championship 2009 Denmark Fajr Cup Gold 2009 2010 China World Cup Gold Bronze Open Belgium 2010 German Open Gold 2011 Asian Clubs Cup Silver 2011 South Korea 2011 World Championship Bronze World Student Gold 2012 2012 British Open Gold 2013 Spanish Open Gold

== Honar ==
2009	Fajr Open	Teheran	-54	senior		7.00	0		
	3.	2009	World Championships	Kopenhagen	-54	senior		30.00	15
	3.	2010	Belgian Open	Herentals	-54	senior		3.00	0
	1.	2011	German Open	Hamburg	-54	senior		7.00	0
	3.	2011	World Championships	Gyeongju	-54	senior		30.00	15
	1.	2011	British Open	Manchester	-54	senior		7.00	0
	1.	2012	Student World Championships	Pocheon	-54	senior		15.00	1
	1.	2013	Spanish Open	Alicante	-54	senior		7.00	0
	PAR	2013	Grand Prix	Manchester	-58	se			
