= Mokdad El-Yamine =

Algerian taekwondo practitioner

Mokdad El-Yamine (born 13 July 1986 in Marseille) is an Algerian taekwondo practitioner. He competed in the 58 kg event at the 2012 Summer Olympics and was eliminated in the preliminary round by Óscar Muñoz.
