= Tseng Yi-hsuan =

Taiwanese taekwondo practitioner

Personal information
- Nationality: Taiwanese
- Born: 5 December 1988 (age 37)

Sport
- Sport: Taekwondo
Medal record
Representing Chinese Taipei
Women's taekwondo
World Championships
Silver medal – second place	2007 Beijing	Bantamweight
Asian Championships
Bronze medal – third place	2008 Henan	-55 kg
Bronze medal – third place	2012 Ho Chi Minh City	-53 kg

Tseng Yi-hsuan (born 5 December 1988) is a Taiwanese taekwondo practitioner. She won a silver medal in bantamweight at the 2007 World Taekwondo Championships. She won bronze medals at the 2008 and 2012 Asian Taekwondo Championships. She competed at the 2006 Asian Games and the 2010 Asian Games.
