= Michael Harvey (taekwondo) =

British taekwondo practitioner

Personal information
- Born: Michael Paul Harvey; 21 September 1989 (age 36)
Medal record
Representing United Kingdom
Men's taekwondo
World Championships
Silver medal – second place	2011 Gyeongju	-63 kg
European Championships
Gold medal – first place	2012 Manchester	-63 kg

Michael Paul Harvey (born 21 September 1989) is a British taekwondo practitioner. He is a European champion at bantamweight (under 63 kilograms), a World silver medalist and has competed in the 2008 Summer Olympics in Beijing.

== Early life ==
Harvey grew up in Hyde, Greater Manchester, United Kingdom and as a teenager he attended Longdendale Community Language College in Hollingworth, Hyde.

== Taekwondo career ==
Harvey began the sport of taekwondo at the early age of 5 years old. After many years of success in the junior ranks he made the switch to the senior divisions and made the GB Taekwondo team for the Beijing Olympics in 2008. Michael lost his first bout to World Silver Medalist and now Olympic Champion Guillermo Perez of Mexico on golden point as the match drew to a close and scoreline of 2-2. In the repechage first round match Michael lost to the man who became Afghanistan's first Olympic medalist in history, Rohullah Nikpai. The match finished with a scoreline of 2–1.

== Taekwondo medals ==
Year	Competition	Venue	Position	Notes
2008	Olympic Games	Beijing	7th	-58 kg
2008	British International Open	Manchester	2nd	-63 kg
2008	Belgian Open	Herentals	2nd	-58 kg
2008	Dutch Open	Eindhoven	2nd	-58 kg
2009	British International Open	Manchester	1st	-63 kg
2010	Belgian Open	Herentals	1st	-63 kg
2011	World Championships	Gyeongju	2nd	-63 kg
2011	Chuncheon Open	Chuncheon	3rd	-68 kg
2011	Goseong Invitational	Goseong	1st	-68 kg
