= 2011 World Taekwondo Championships =

Taekwondo competition

- Venue: Gyeongju Indoor Stadium
- Location: Gyeongju, South Korea
- Dates: 1–6 May 2011
- Competitors: 949 from 144 nations

Champions
- Men: Iran
- Women: South Korea

The 2011 World Taekwondo Championships was the 20th edition of the World Taekwondo Championships, and was held at Gyeongju Indoor Stadium in Gyeongju, South Korea from 1 to 6 May 2011.

== Medal table ==
| Rank | Nation | Gold | Silver | Bronze | Total |
|---|---|---|---|---|---|
| 1 | South Korea | 3 | 4 | 3 | 10 |
| 2 | Iran | 3 | 1 | 2 | 6 |
| 3 | China | 2 | 2 | 0 | 4 |
| 4 | Thailand | 2 | 1 | 1 | 4 |
| 5 | France | 2 | 0 | 1 | 3 |
| 6 | Great Britain | 1 | 2 | 1 | 4 |
| 7 | Turkey | 1 | 1 | 4 | 6 |
| 8 | Croatia | 1 | 1 | 0 | 2 |
| 9 | Spain | 1 | 0 | 3 | 4 |
| 10 | Morocco | 0 | 1 | 2 | 3 |
| 11 | Chinese Taipei | 0 | 1 | 1 | 2 |
| 12 | Portugal | 0 | 1 | 0 | 1 |
| 12 | Uzbekistan | 0 | 1 | 0 | 1 |
| 14 | Russia | 0 | 0 | 3 | 3 |
| 15 | Germany | 0 | 0 | 2 | 2 |
| 16 | Afghanistan | 0 | 0 | 1 | 1 |
| 16 | Azerbaijan | 0 | 0 | 1 | 1 |
| 16 | Canada | 0 | 0 | 1 | 1 |
| 16 | Cyprus | 0 | 0 | 1 | 1 |
| 16 | Dominican Republic | 0 | 0 | 1 | 1 |
| 16 | Italy | 0 | 0 | 1 | 1 |
| 16 | Mali | 0 | 0 | 1 | 1 |
| 16 | Serbia | 0 | 0 | 1 | 1 |
| 16 | Vietnam | 0 | 0 | 1 | 1 |
| Totals (24 entries) | | 16 | 16 | 32 | 64 |

== Medal summary ==
=== Men ===
| Event | Gold | Silver | Bronze |
|---|---|---|---|
| Finweight (−54 kg) | Chutchawal Khawlaor; Thailand | Park Ji-woong; South Korea | Seyfula Magomedov; Russia |
| Finweight (−54 kg) | Chutchawal Khawlaor; Thailand | Park Ji-woong; South Korea | Meisam Bagheri; Iran |
| Flyweight (−58 kg) | Joel González; Spain | Rui Bragança; Portugal | Wei Chen-yang; Chinese Taipei |
| Flyweight (−58 kg) | Joel González; Spain | Rui Bragança; Portugal | Gabriel Mercedes; Dominican Republic |
| Bantamweight (−63 kg) | Lee Dae-hoon; South Korea | Michael Harvey; Great Britain | Nacha Punthong; Thailand |
| Bantamweight (−63 kg) | Lee Dae-hoon; South Korea | Michael Harvey; Great Britain | Lê Huỳnh Châu; Vietnam |
| Featherweight (−68 kg) | Servet Tazegül; Turkey | Mohammad Bagheri Motamed; Iran | Rohullah Nikpai; Afghanistan |
| Featherweight (−68 kg) | Servet Tazegül; Turkey | Mohammad Bagheri Motamed; Iran | Martin Stamper; Great Britain |
| Lightweight (−74 kg) | Alireza Nasr Azadani; Iran | Patiwat Thongsalap; Thailand | Ismaël Coulibaly; Mali |
| Lightweight (−74 kg) | Alireza Nasr Azadani; Iran | Patiwat Thongsalap; Thailand | Rıdvan Baygut; Turkey |
| Welterweight (−80 kg) | Farzad Abdollahi; Iran | Yunus Sarı; Turkey | Issam Chernoubi; Morocco |
| Welterweight (−80 kg) | Farzad Abdollahi; Iran | Yunus Sarı; Turkey | Ramin Azizov; Azerbaijan |
| Middleweight (−87 kg) | Yousef Karami; Iran | Cha Dong-min; South Korea | Jon García; Spain |
| Middleweight (−87 kg) | Yousef Karami; Iran | Cha Dong-min; South Korea | Carlo Molfetta; Italy |
| Heavyweight (+87 kg) | Jo Chol-ho; South Korea | Akmal Irgashev; Uzbekistan | Kourosh Rajoli; Iran |
| Heavyweight (+87 kg) | Jo Chol-ho; South Korea | Akmal Irgashev; Uzbekistan | Andreas Stylianou; Cyprus |

=== Women ===
| Event | Gold | Silver | Bronze |
|---|---|---|---|
| Finweight (−46 kg) | Kim So-hui; South Korea | Li Zhaoyi; China | Rukiye Yıldırım; Turkey |
| Finweight (−46 kg) | Kim So-hui; South Korea | Li Zhaoyi; China | Sümeyye Manz; Germany |
| Flyweight (−49 kg) | Wu Jingyu; China | Yang Shu-chun; Chinese Taipei | Brigitte Yagüe; Spain |
| Flyweight (−49 kg) | Wu Jingyu; China | Yang Shu-chun; Chinese Taipei | Sanaa Atabrour; Morocco |
| Bantamweight (−53 kg) | Ana Zaninović; Croatia | Lamyaa Bekkali; Morocco | Lee Hye-young; South Korea |
| Bantamweight (−53 kg) | Ana Zaninović; Croatia | Lamyaa Bekkali; Morocco | Hatice Kübra Yangın; Turkey |
| Featherweight (−57 kg) | Hou Yuzhuo; China | Jade Jones; Great Britain | Marlène Harnois; France |
| Featherweight (−57 kg) | Hou Yuzhuo; China | Jade Jones; Great Britain | Lim Su-jeong; South Korea |
| Lightweight (−62 kg) | Rangsiya Nisaisom; Thailand | Marina Sumić; Croatia | Karine Sergerie; Canada |
| Lightweight (−62 kg) | Rangsiya Nisaisom; Thailand | Marina Sumić; Croatia | Dürdane Altunel; Turkey |
| Welterweight (−67 kg) | Sarah Stevenson; Great Britain | Guo Yunfei; China | Hwang Kyung-seon; South Korea |
| Welterweight (−67 kg) | Sarah Stevenson; Great Britain | Guo Yunfei; China | Helena Fromm; Germany |
| Middleweight (−73 kg) | Gwladys Épangue; France | Oh Hye-ri; South Korea | Milica Mandić; Serbia |
| Middleweight (−73 kg) | Gwladys Épangue; France | Oh Hye-ri; South Korea | Anastasia Baryshnikova; Russia |
| Heavyweight (+73 kg) | Anne-Caroline Graffe; France | An Sae-bom; South Korea | Rosana Simón; Spain |
| Heavyweight (+73 kg) | Anne-Caroline Graffe; France | An Sae-bom; South Korea | Olga Ivanova; Russia |

== Team ranking ==
Iran grabbed the men's overall title, It marked the first time that Korea failed to retain the men's overall title in the history of the biennial World Taekwondo Championships.

=== Men ===
| Rank | Team | Points |
|---|---|---|
| 1 | Iran | 74 |
| 2 | South Korea | 61 |
| 3 | Turkey | 48 |
| 4 | Thailand | 37 |
| 5 | Spain | 36 |
| 6 | China | 31 |
| 7 | Great Britain | 28 |
| 8 | Uzbekistan | 28 |
| 9 | Russia | 28 |
| 10 | Italy | 27 |

=== Women ===
| Rank | Team | Points |
|---|---|---|
| 1 | South Korea | 58 |
| 2 | China | 55 |
| 3 | France | 45 |
| 4 | Croatia | 35 |
| 5 | Turkey | 31 |
| 6 | Russia | 31 |
| 7 | Morocco | 30 |
| 8 | Great Britain | 29 |
| 9 | Thailand | 29 |
| 10 | Spain | 29 |

== Participating nations ==
According to the competition draws, 949 athletes from 144 nations competed.

- Afghanistan (5)
- Albania (3)
- Algeria (6)
- Argentina (6)
- Armenia (4)
- Aruba (3)
- Australia (15)
- Austria (6)
- Azerbaijan (16)
- Bahrain (2)
- Bangladesh (2)
- Belarus (9)
- Benin (2)
- Bhutan (2)
- Bolivia (2)
- Bosnia and Herzegovina (7)
- Brazil (15)
- Bulgaria (5)
- Cambodia (2)
- Cameroon (9)
- Canada (16)
- Central African Republic (2)
- Chile (9)
- China (16)
- Chinese Taipei (16)
- Colombia (15)
- Congo (7)
- Congo DR (12)
- Costa Rica (3)
- Croatia (10)
- Cuba (2)
- Cyprus (10)
- Czech Republic (4)
- Denmark (4)
- Dominican Republic (13)
- East Timor (2)
- Ecuador (5)
- Egypt (14)
- El Salvador (3)
- Ethiopia (3)
- Finland (3)
- France (16)
- Gabon (3)
- Georgia (7)
- Germany (14)
- Ghana (4)
- Great Britain (10)
- Greece (16)
- Grenada (2)
- Guatemala (7)
- Guinea (1)
- Guyana (2)
- Haiti (5)
- Honduras (6)
- Hong Kong (13)
- Hungary (5)
- Iceland (3)
- India (11)
- Indonesia (14)
- Iran (12)
- Iraq (5)
- Ireland (2)
- Israel (6)
- Italy (12)
- Ivory Coast (2)
- Jamaica (2)
- Japan (8)
- Jordan (10)
- Kazakhstan (15)
- Kenya (14)
- Kiribati (2)
- Kyrgyzstan (3)
- Laos (2)
- Latvia (2)
- Lebanon (6)
- Lesotho (2)
- Libya (5)
- Lithuania (2)
- Macau (4)
- Macedonia (3)
- Madagascar (2)
- Malaysia (2)
- Mali (7)
- Mauritius (1)
- Mexico (16)
- Moldova (2)
- Mongolia (11)
- Montenegro (2)
- Morocco (13)
- Mozambique (11)
- Myanmar (4)
- Nepal (2)
- Netherlands (12)
- Netherlands Antilles (3)
- New Caledonia (1)
- New Zealand (8)
- Niger (1)
- Nigeria (6)
- Norway (6)
- Pakistan (3)
- Palestine (3)
- Panama (2)
- Papua New Guinea (1)
- Paraguay (2)
- Peru (1)
- Philippines (11)
- Poland (6)
- Portugal (4)
- Puerto Rico (13)
- Qatar (6)
- Romania (3)
- Russia (16)
- Saint Kitts and Nevis (2)
- Samoa (2)
- São Tomé and Príncipe (2)
- Senegal (7)
- Serbia (8)
- Singapore (5)
- Slovakia (2)
- Slovenia (5)
- South Africa (3)
- South Korea (16)
- Spain (16)
- Sudan (8)
- Suriname (3)
- Sweden (10)
- Switzerland (3)
- Syria (1)
- Tajikistan (7)
- Thailand (12)
- Tonga (4)
- Trinidad and Tobago (5)
- Tunisia (4)
- Turkey (16)
- U. S. Virgin Islands (2)
- Ukraine (11)
- United Arab Emirates (5)
- United States (16)
- Uzbekistan (13)
- Vanuatu (2)
- Venezuela (15)
- Vietnam (11)
- Yemen (2)
- Zimbabwe (2)
