= Tshomlee Go =

Filipino taekwondo practitioner

Medal record

Men's taekwondo

Representing the Philippines

Asian Games
Silver medal – second place	2006 Doha	Bantamweight
Bronze medal – third place	2010 Guangzhou	Bantamweight

Asian Championships
Silver medal – second place	2000 Hong Kong	Finweight
Bronze medal – third place	2004 Seongnam	Flyweight

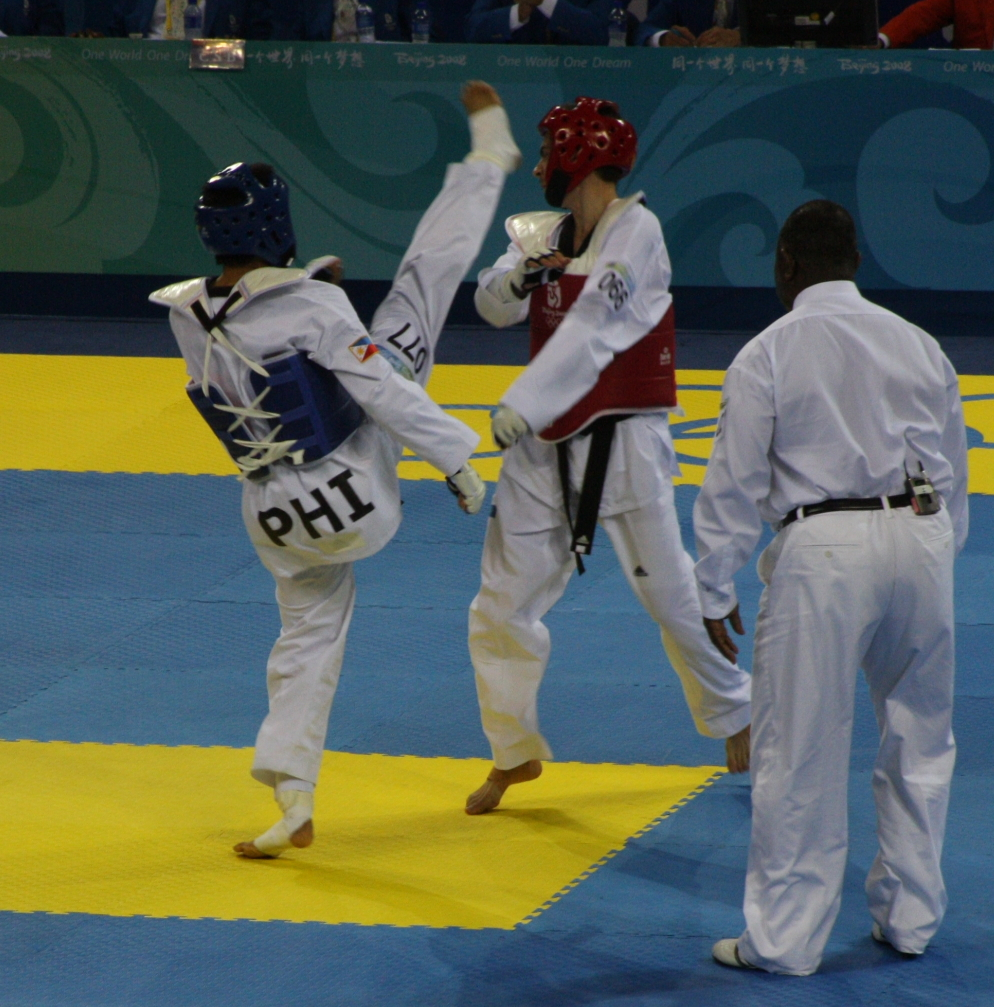
2008 Summer Olympics Taekwondo - Tshomlee Go v. Ryan Carneli (AUS)

Tshomlee Cabanos Go (born January 13, 1981, in Iriga, Camarines Sur) is a taekwondo practitioner from the Philippines. He represented the country in the 2004 and 2008 Summer Olympics.

Go and his family left the Philippines sometime in the early 2010s to migrate to California in the United States. As of 2020, he works as a captain for a ship of the San Francisco Bay Ferry service and as an instructor in a gymnasium in Walnut Creek.

== See also ==
- Philippines at the 2008 Summer Olympics
