= 2009 World Taekwondo Championships =

Taekwondo competition

- Venue: Ballerup Super Arena
- Location: Copenhagen, Denmark
- Dates: 14–18 October 2009
- Competitors: 927 from 142 nations

Champions
- Men: South Korea
- Women: China

The 2009 World Taekwondo Championships are the 19th edition of the World Taekwondo Championships, and were held at Ballerup Super Arena in Copenhagen, Denmark from 14 to 18 October 2009.

== Medal table ==
* Host nation (Denmark)

Rank	Nation	Gold	Silver	Bronze	Total
1	South Korea	5	2	2	9
2	Spain	3	1	3	7
3	China	2	2	1	5
4	United States	2	0	1	3
5	Iran	1	1	3	5
6	Turkey	1	0	3	4
7	France	1	0	1	2
8	Mali	1	0	0	1
9	Italy	0	2	0	2
9	Mexico	0	2	0	2
11	Thailand	0	1	3	4
12	Canada	0	1	2	3
13	Afghanistan	0	1	1	2
13	Russia	0	1	1	2
15	Cuba	0	1	0	1
15	Puerto Rico	0	1	0	1
17	Argentina	0	0	1	1
17	Azerbaijan	0	0	1	1
17	Brazil	0	0	1	1
17	Chinese Taipei	0	0	1	1
17	Croatia	0	0	1	1
17	Germany	0	0	1	1
17	Guatemala	0	0	1	1
17	Kazakhstan	0	0	1	1
17	Norway	0	0	1	1
17	Senegal	0	0	1	1
17	Serbia	0	0	1	1
Totals (27 entries)		16	16	32	64

== Medal summary ==
=== Men ===
Event	Gold	Silver	Bronze
Finweight (−54 kg)	Choi Yeon-ho; South Korea	Mahmood Haidari; Afghanistan	Chutchawal Khawlaor; Thailand
Finweight (−54 kg)	Choi Yeon-ho; South Korea	Mahmood Haidari; Afghanistan	Meisam Bagheri; Iran
Flyweight (−58 kg)	Joel González; Spain	Damián Villa; Mexico	Sayed Hasan Rezai; Afghanistan
Flyweight (−58 kg)	Joel González; Spain	Damián Villa; Mexico	Mauro Crismanich; Argentina
Bantamweight (−63 kg)	Yeom Hyo-seob; South Korea	Reza Naderian; Iran	Javier Marrón; Spain
Bantamweight (−63 kg)	Yeom Hyo-seob; South Korea	Reza Naderian; Iran	Cem Uluğnuyan; Turkey
Featherweight (−68 kg)	Mohammad Bagheri Motamed; Iran	Idulio Islas; Mexico	Servet Tazegül; Turkey
Featherweight (−68 kg)	Mohammad Bagheri Motamed; Iran	Idulio Islas; Mexico	Balla Dièye; Senegal
Lightweight (−74 kg)	Kim Joon-tae; South Korea	Maxime Potvin; Canada	Mark López; United States
Lightweight (−74 kg)	Kim Joon-tae; South Korea	Maxime Potvin; Canada	Mokdad Ounis; Germany
Welterweight (−80 kg)	Steven López; United States	Nicolás García; Spain	Sébastien Michaud; Canada
Welterweight (−80 kg)	Steven López; United States	Nicolás García; Spain	Rashad Ahmadov; Azerbaijan
Middleweight (−87 kg)	Bahri Tanrıkulu; Turkey	Carlo Molfetta; Italy	Vanja Babić; Serbia
Middleweight (−87 kg)	Bahri Tanrıkulu; Turkey	Carlo Molfetta; Italy	Yousef Karami; Iran
Heavyweight (+87 kg)	Daba Modibo Keïta; Mali	Nam Yun-bae; South Korea	Hossein Tajik; Iran
Heavyweight (+87 kg)	Daba Modibo Keïta; Mali	Nam Yun-bae; South Korea	Arman Chilmanov; Kazakhstan

=== Women ===
Event	Gold	Silver	Bronze
Finweight (−46 kg)	Park Hyo-ji; South Korea	Zoraida Santiago; Puerto Rico	Buttree Puedpong; Thailand
Finweight (−46 kg)	Park Hyo-ji; South Korea	Zoraida Santiago; Puerto Rico	Yvette Yong; Canada
Flyweight (−49 kg)	Brigitte Yagüe; Spain	Anna Soboleva; Russia	Wu Jingyu; China
Flyweight (−49 kg)	Brigitte Yagüe; Spain	Anna Soboleva; Russia	Yasmina Aziez; France
Bantamweight (−53 kg)	Danielle Pelham; United States	Sarita Phongsri; Thailand	Kwon Eun-kyung; South Korea
Bantamweight (−53 kg)	Danielle Pelham; United States	Sarita Phongsri; Thailand	Euda Carías; Guatemala
Featherweight (−57 kg)	Hou Yuzhuo; China	Veronica Calabrese; Italy	Andrea Rica; Spain
Featherweight (−57 kg)	Hou Yuzhuo; China	Veronica Calabrese; Italy	Tseng Pei-hua; Chinese Taipei
Lightweight (−62 kg)	Lim Su-jeong; South Korea	Zhang Hua; China	Estefanía Hernández; Spain
Lightweight (−62 kg)	Lim Su-jeong; South Korea	Zhang Hua; China	Chonnapas Premwaew; Thailand
Welterweight (−67 kg)	Gwladys Épangue; France	Taimí Castellanos; Cuba	Sandra Šarić; Croatia
Welterweight (−67 kg)	Gwladys Épangue; France	Taimí Castellanos; Cuba	Nikolina Kursar; Norway
Middleweight (−73 kg)	Han Yingying; China	Lee In-jong; South Korea	Furkan Asena Aydın; Turkey
Middleweight (−73 kg)	Han Yingying; China	Lee In-jong; South Korea	Anastasia Baryshnikova; Russia
Heavyweight (+73 kg)	Rosana Simón; Spain	Liu Rui; China	Jo Seol; South Korea
Heavyweight (+73 kg)	Rosana Simón; Spain	Liu Rui; China	Natália Falavigna; Brazil

== Team ranking ==
China grabbed the women's overall title, It marked the first time that Korea failed to retain the women's overall title in the history of the biennial World Taekwondo Championships.

=== Men ===
Rank	Team	Points
1	South Korea	63
2	Iran	55
3	Spain	42
4	Turkey	41
5	United States	41
6	Mexico	40
7	Canada	29
8	Afghanistan	28
9	Azerbaijan	25
10	Germany	24

=== Women ===
Rank	Team	Points
1	China	64
2	South Korea	54
3	Spain	50
4	France	38
5	United States	32
6	Chinese Taipei	30
7	Russia	28
8	Thailand	25
9	Canada	25
10	Turkey	24

== Participating nations ==
927 athletes from 142 nations competed.

- Afghanistan (7)
- Algeria (11)
- Andorra (2)
- Angola (2)
- Argentina (6)
- Armenia (4)
- Aruba (3)
- Australia (15)
- Austria (5)
- Azerbaijan (12)
- Bangladesh (2)
- Barbados (2)
- Belarus (7)
- Belgium (6)
- Belize (1)
- Benin (2)
- Bhutan (2)
- Bolivia (2)
- Bosnia and Herzegovina (6)
- Brazil (16)
- Bulgaria (4)
- Burkina Faso (2)
- Cambodia (2)
- Cameroon (5)
- Canada (16)
- Cape Verde (2)
- Central African Republic (3)
- Chile (9)
- China (16)
- Chinese Taipei (16)
- Colombia (15)
- Congo DR (6)
- Costa Rica (4)
- Croatia (12)
- Cuba (10)
- Cyprus (14)
- Czech Republic (7)
- Denmark (13)
- Dominican Republic (13)
- Ecuador (5)
- Egypt (10)
- El Salvador (2)
- Ethiopia (3)
- Finland (3)
- France (16)
- Gabon (3)
- Gambia (1)
- Germany (12)
- Ghana (4)
- Great Britain (10)
- Greece (15)
- Grenada (2)
- Guatemala (5)
- Guinea (2)
- Guyana (3)
- Haiti (4)
- Honduras (8)
- Hungary (8)
- Iceland (3)
- India (8)
- Indonesia (2)
- Iran (13)
- Iraq (5)
- Ireland (5)
- Israel (8)
- Italy (13)
- Ivory Coast (12)
- Japan (5)
- Jordan (10)
- Kazakhstan (15)
- Kenya (11)
- Kuwait (6)
- Kyrgyzstan (2)
- Laos (3)
- Latvia (2)
- Lebanon (10)
- Lesotho (3)
- Liberia (1)
- Libya (7)
- Lithuania (4)
- Macau (2)
- Madagascar (2)
- Malaysia (4)
- Mali (7)
- Mauritius (1)
- Mexico (16)
- Monaco (2)
- Mongolia (2)
- Montenegro (1)
- Morocco (12)
- Myanmar (2)
- Nepal (3)
- Netherlands (6)
- Netherlands Antilles (3)
- New Zealand (9)
- Nicaragua (2)
- Nigeria (6)
- Norway (8)
- Pakistan (1)
- Palestine (5)
- Panama (2)
- Paraguay (2)
- Peru (3)
- Philippines (12)
- Poland (6)
- Portugal (3)
- Puerto Rico (14)
- Qatar (4)
- Romania (4)
- Russia (16)
- Samoa (3)
- Senegal (8)
- Serbia (12)
- Singapore (4)
- Slovakia (1)
- Slovenia (7)
- South Africa (3)
- South Korea (16)
- Spain (16)
- Sri Lanka (2)
- Sudan (1)
- Suriname (5)
- Sweden (13)
- Switzerland (3)
- Syria (2)
- Tajikistan (8)
- Thailand (8)
- Tonga (2)
- Trinidad and Tobago (5)
- Tunisia (3)
- Turkey (16)
- Uganda (2)
- Ukraine (16)
- United States (11)
- Uruguay (2)
- Uzbekistan (11)
- Vanuatu (2)
- Venezuela (16)
- Vietnam (15)
- Yemen (2)
- Zambia (2)
- Zimbabwe (3)
