= Sarita Phongsri =

Thai taekwondo practitioner

Medal record

Women's taekwondo

Representing Thailand

World Championships
Silver medal – second place	2009 Copenhagen	53 kg

Asian Games
Gold medal – first place	2010 Guangzhou	53 kg

Asian Championships
Bronze medal – third place	2014 Tashkent	53 kg

Universiade
Bronze medal – third place	2009 Belgrade	55 kg

Southeast Asian Games
Gold medal – first place	2009 Vientiane	53 kg
Gold medal – first place	2011 Jakarta-Palembang	53 kg
Gold medal – first place	2013 Naypiydaw	53 kg

Sarita Phongsri (Thai: สริตา ผ่องศรี; born October 12, 1991) is a Thai taekwondo practitioner. She has been nicknamed "Yin" (Thai: หยิน).
