= Nacha Punthong =

Thai taekwondo practitioner

Sport
- Country: Thailand
- Sport: Taekwondo
Medal record
Men's taekwondo
Representing Thailand
Asian Games
| Silver medal – second place | 2010 Guangzhou | 63 kg |
Summer Universiade
| Silver medal – second place | 2007 Bangkok | 62 kg |

Nacha Punthong is a Thai taekwondo practitioner. In 2010, he won the silver medal in the men's 63 kg event at the 2010 Asian Games held in Guangzhou, China. In the final, he lost against Lee Dae-hoon of South Korea.

In 2006, he competed in the men's 62 kg event at the 2006 Asian Games held in Doha, Qatar where he was eliminated in his first match, against Kim Ju-young of South Korea. The following year, he won the silver medal in the men's 62 kg event at the 2007 Summer Universiade held in Bangkok, Thailand.
