= Reza Naderian =

Iranian taekwondo practitioner

Personal information
- Born: January 29, 1989 (age 37) Isfahan, Iran
Medal record
Men's taekwondo
Representing Iran
World Championships
Silver medal – second place	2009 Copenhagen	63 kg
Asian Championships
Silver medal – second place	2008 Luoyang	62 kg
Bronze medal – third place	2010 Astana	63 kg
World Combat Games
Silver medal – second place	2010 Beijing	68 kg

Reza Naderian (Persian: رضا نادریان, born January 29, 1989, in Isfahan, Iran) is an Iranian Taekwondo athlete who competed in the Men's 58 kg at the 2008 Summer Olympics.
