= Taekwondo at the 2010 Asian Games =

- Venue: Guangdong Gymnasium
- Dates: 17–20 November 2010
- Competitors: 247 from 37 nations

Taekwondo at the 2010 Asian Games was held in Guangzhou, China from November 17 to 20, 2010. Men's and women's competitions were held in eight weight categories for each gender. All competition took place at the Guangdong Gymnasium. Each country was limited to having 6 men and 6 women.

== Schedule ==
P	Preliminary rounds	F	Final

Event↓/Date →	17th Wed		18th Thu		19th Fri		20th Sat	
Men's 54 kg							P	F
Men's 58 kg							P	F
Men's 63 kg					P	F		
Men's 68 kg					P	F		
Men's 74 kg	P	F						
Men's 80 kg			P	F				
Men's 87 kg	P	F						
Men's +87 kg			P	F				
Women's 46 kg	P	F						
Women's 49 kg	P	F						
Women's 53 kg			P	F				
Women's 57 kg			P	F				
Women's 62 kg					P	F		
Women's 67 kg					P	F		
Women's 73 kg							P	F
Women's +73 kg							P	F

== Medalists ==
=== Men ===
Event	Gold	Silver	Bronze
Finweight (−54 kg)	Chutchawal Khawlaor; Thailand	Kim Seong-ho; South Korea	Japoy Lizardo; Philippines
Finweight (−54 kg)	Chutchawal Khawlaor; Thailand	Kim Seong-ho; South Korea	Hsu Chia-lin; Chinese Taipei
Flyweight (−58 kg)	Wei Chen-yang; Chinese Taipei	Pen-ek Karaket; Thailand	Xu Yongzeng; China
Flyweight (−58 kg)	Wei Chen-yang; Chinese Taipei	Pen-ek Karaket; Thailand	Paul Romero; Philippines
Bantamweight (−63 kg)	Lee Dae-hoon; South Korea	Nacha Punthong; Thailand	Jawad Lakzaee; Afghanistan
Bantamweight (−63 kg)	Lee Dae-hoon; South Korea	Nacha Punthong; Thailand	Tshomlee Go; Philippines
Featherweight (−68 kg)	Mohammad Bagheri Motamed; Iran	Jang Se-wook; South Korea	Huang Jiannan; China
Featherweight (−68 kg)	Mohammad Bagheri Motamed; Iran	Jang Se-wook; South Korea	Lo Tsung-jui; Chinese Taipei
Lightweight (−74 kg)	Alireza Nasr Azadani; Iran	Dmitriy Kim; Uzbekistan	Dương Thanh Tâm; Vietnam
Lightweight (−74 kg)	Alireza Nasr Azadani; Iran	Dmitriy Kim; Uzbekistan	Patiwat Thongsalap; Thailand
Welterweight (−80 kg)	Nabil Talal; Jordan	Nesar Ahmad Bahave; Afghanistan	Zhao Lin; China
Welterweight (−80 kg)	Nabil Talal; Jordan	Nesar Ahmad Bahave; Afghanistan	Farzad Abdollahi; Iran
Middleweight (−87 kg)	Yousef Karami; Iran	Park Yong-hyun; South Korea	Yin Zhimeng; China
Middleweight (−87 kg)	Yousef Karami; Iran	Park Yong-hyun; South Korea	Nguyễn Trọng Cường; Vietnam
Heavyweight (+87 kg)	Heo Jun-nyung; South Korea	Zheng Yi; China	Arman Chilmanov; Kazakhstan
Heavyweight (+87 kg)	Heo Jun-nyung; South Korea	Zheng Yi; China	Akmal Irgashev; Uzbekistan

=== Women ===
Event	Gold	Silver	Bronze
Finweight (−46 kg)	Huang Hsien-yung; Chinese Taipei	Dana Haidar; Jordan	Fransisca Valentina; Indonesia
Finweight (−46 kg)	Huang Hsien-yung; Chinese Taipei	Dana Haidar; Jordan	Sara Khoshjamal Fekri; Iran
Flyweight (−49 kg)	Wu Jingyu; China	Erika Kasahara; Japan	Vũ Thị Hậu; Vietnam
Flyweight (−49 kg)	Wu Jingyu; China	Erika Kasahara; Japan	Chanatip Sonkham; Thailand
Bantamweight (−53 kg)	Sarita Phongsri; Thailand	Nguyễn Thị Hoài Thu; Vietnam	Kwon Eun-kyung; South Korea
Bantamweight (−53 kg)	Sarita Phongsri; Thailand	Nguyễn Thị Hoài Thu; Vietnam	Samaneh Sheshpari; Iran
Featherweight (−57 kg)	Lee Sung-hye; South Korea	Hou Yuzhuo; China	Sousan Hajipour; Iran
Featherweight (−57 kg)	Lee Sung-hye; South Korea	Hou Yuzhuo; China	Andrea Paoli; Lebanon
Lightweight (−62 kg)	Noh Eun-sil; South Korea	Raheleh Asemani; Iran	Dhunyanun Premwaew; Thailand
Lightweight (−62 kg)	Noh Eun-sil; South Korea	Raheleh Asemani; Iran	Chang Chiung-fang; Chinese Taipei
Welterweight (−67 kg)	Guo Yunfei; China	Parisa Farshidi; Iran	Gulnafis Aitmukhambetova; Kazakhstan
Welterweight (−67 kg)	Guo Yunfei; China	Parisa Farshidi; Iran	Kang Bo-hyeon; South Korea
Middleweight (−73 kg)	Luo Wei; China	Feruza Yergeshova; Kazakhstan	Rapatkorn Prasopsuk; Thailand
Middleweight (−73 kg)	Luo Wei; China	Feruza Yergeshova; Kazakhstan	Kirstie Alora; Philippines
Heavyweight (+73 kg)	Liu Rui; China	Oh Jung-ah; South Korea	Nadin Dawani; Jordan
Heavyweight (+73 kg)	Liu Rui; China	Oh Jung-ah; South Korea	Evgeniya Karimova; Uzbekistan

== Medal table ==
Rank	Nation	Gold	Silver	Bronze	Total
1	South Korea (KOR)	4	4	2	10
2	China (CHN)	4	2	4	10
3	Iran (IRI)	3	2	4	9
4	Thailand (THA)	2	2	4	8
5	Chinese Taipei (TPE)	2	0	3	5
6	Jordan (JOR)	1	1	1	3
7	Vietnam (VIE)	0	1	3	4
8	Kazakhstan (KAZ)	0	1	2	3
8	Uzbekistan (UZB)	0	1	2	3
10	Afghanistan (AFG)	0	1	1	2
11	Japan (JPN)	0	1	0	1
12	Philippines (PHI)	0	0	4	4
13	Indonesia (INA)	0	0	1	1
13	Lebanon (LIB)	0	0	1	1
Totals (14 entries)		16	16	32	64

== Participating nations ==
A total of 247 athletes from 37 nations competed in taekwondo at the 2010 Asian Games:

- Afghanistan (7)
- Athletes from Kuwait (6)
- Bahrain (7)
- Bangladesh (4)
- Bhutan (8)
- Cambodia (4)
- China (12)
- Chinese Taipei (12)
- Hong Kong (1)
- India (10)
- Indonesia (6)
- Iran (12)
- Japan (4)
- Jordan (12)
- Kazakhstan (12)
- Kyrgyzstan (2)
- Laos (6)
- Lebanon (7)
- Macau (3)
- Malaysia (5)
- Mongolia (2)
- Nepal (12)
- Palestine (2)
- Philippines (12)
- Qatar (5)
- Saudi Arabia (5)
- Singapore (1)
- South Korea (12)
- Sri Lanka (2)
- Tajikistan (8)
- Thailand (11)
- Timor-Leste (5)
- Turkmenistan (2)
- United Arab Emirates (3)
- Uzbekistan (9)
- Vietnam (12)
- Yemen (4)
