= 2011 Asian Taekwondo Olympic Qualification Tournament =

The 2011 Asian Qualification Tournament for the London Olympic Games was held in Bangkok, Thailand, from November 26 to November 27, 2011. Each country may enter a maximum of 2 male and 2 female divisions, with only one athlete per weight division. The top three ranked athletes in each weight division qualify their National Olympic Committees (NOCs) for a place in the Olympic Games.

== Qualification summary ==
NOC	Men				Women				Total
NOC	−58kg	−68kg	−80kg	+80kg	−49kg	−57kg	−67kg	+67kg	Total
Afghanistan		X	X						2
China				X					1
Chinese Taipei	X								1
Iran							X		1
Japan					X	X			2
Jordan		X			X			X	3
Kazakhstan	X						X	X	3
Kyrgyzstan			X						1
Lebanon						X			1
Tajikistan			X	X					2
Thailand					X	X			2
Uzbekistan		X		X				X	3
Vietnam	X						X		2
Total: 13 NOCs	3	3	3	3	3	3	3	3	24

== Men ==
=== −58 kg ===
27 November

Round of 32
P. S. H. Weerasinghage (SRI)	DQ	~~Fares Jaber Al-Tayer (UAE)~~

Round of 16
Wei Chen-yang (TPE)	8
P. S. H. Weerasinghage (SRI)	2
Rohit Tamang (NEP)	10
Ong Stevanus (INA)	19
Sonexay Mangkheua (LAO)	14
Yuki Mitsuhashi (JPN)	21
Jason Tan (SIN)	1
Ryan Chong (MAS)	7
Abdulrahim Abdulhameed (BRN)	12
Kinley Penjor (BHU)	2
Nursultan Mamayev (KAZ)	9
Dügreegiin Lkhagvadorj (MGL)	4
Lê Huỳnh Châu (VIE)	8
Zoheb Khalid (PAK)	1
Tameem Al-Kubati (YEM)	10
Japoy Lizardo (PHI)	14

Quarterfinals
Wei Chen-yang (TPE)	7
Ong Stevanus (INA)	4
Yuki Mitsuhashi (JPN)	8
Ryan Chong (MAS)	11
Abdulrahim Abdulhameed (BRN)	2
Nursultan Mamayev (KAZ)	5
Lê Huỳnh Châu (VIE)	9
Japoy Lizardo (PHI)	4

Semifinals
Wei Chen-yang (TPE)	6
Ryan Chong (MAS)	4
Nursultan Mamayev (KAZ)	11
Lê Huỳnh Châu (VIE)	4

Final
Wei Chen-yang (TPE)	7
Nursultan Mamayev (KAZ)	5
3rd place
Ryan Chong (MAS)	3
Lê Huỳnh Châu (VIE)	9

=== −68 kg ===
26 November

Round of 32
Afifuddin Omar Sidek (MAS)	5–0	Thinley Dorji (BHU)
Naranchimegiin Erdenebaatar (MGL)	12–13	Ashish Maharjan (NEP)
Junaidi Alfred Blegur (INA)	3–7	Dmitriy Kim (UZB)

Round of 16
Mohammad Abulibdeh (JOR)	WD
Afifuddin Omar Sidek (MAS)
Daren Tubbs (CAM)	DQ
~~Jaber Jamal Al-Ali (UAE)~~
Samuel Morrison (PHI)	9
Yeung Tsz Wing (HKG)	15
Michel Samaha (LIB)	4
Lo Tsung-jui (TPE)	5
Rohullah Nikpai (AFG)	16
Ashish Maharjan (NEP)	1
Yoshihiro Nagano (JPN)	15
Alimjan Tadjibaev (KGZ)	16
Chandan Lakra (IND)	5
Yaser Bamatraf (YEM)	7
Dmitriy Kim (UZB)	13
Nacha Punthong (THA)	11

Quarterfinals
Mohammad Abulibdeh (JOR)	17
Daren Tubbs (CAM)	4
Yeung Tsz Wing (HKG)	6
Lo Tsung-jui (TPE)	12
Rohullah Nikpai (AFG)	11
Alimjan Tadjibaev (KGZ)	4
Yaser Bamatraf (YEM)	3
Dmitriy Kim (UZB)	5

Semifinals
Mohammad Abulibdeh (JOR)	8
Lo Tsung-jui (TPE)	2
Rohullah Nikpai (AFG)	10
Dmitriy Kim (UZB)	13

Final
Mohammad Abulibdeh (JOR)	3
Dmitriy Kim (UZB)	0
3rd place
Lo Tsung-jui (TPE)	5
Rohullah Nikpai (AFG)	6

=== −80 kg ===
26 November

Round of 16
Ahmed Abbas (BRN)	6
Rasul Abduraim (KGZ)	14
Anand Pandiarajan (IND)	4
Farkhod Negmatov (TJK)	11
Fong Ka Chun (HKG)	1
Dương Thanh Tâm (VIE)	3

Quarterfinals
Nabil Talal (JOR)	4
Rasul Abduraim (KGZ)	5
Atief Arshad (PAK)	12
Ahmed Maher Saad (QAT)	13
Li Lai (CHN)	7
Farkhod Negmatov (TJK)	8
Dương Thanh Tâm (VIE)
Nesar Ahmad Bahave (AFG)	WD

Semifinals
Rasul Abduraim (KGZ)	5
Ahmed Maher Saad (QAT)	4
Farkhod Negmatov (TJK)
Nesar Ahmad Bahave (AFG)	PUN

Final
Rasul Abduraim (KGZ)
Nesar Ahmad Bahave (AFG)	WD
3rd place
Ahmed Maher Saad (QAT)	2
Farkhod Negmatov (TJK)	9

=== +80 kg ===
27 November

Quarterfinals
Abdulqader Al-Adhami (QAT)	8
Alisher Gulov (TJK)	11
Liu Xiaobo (CHN)	KO
Patira Mohottilage (SRI)
Elias El-Hidari (LIB)	2
Arman Chilmanov (KAZ)	1

Semifinals
Akmal Irgashev (UZB)	5
Alisher Gulov (TJK)	6
Liu Xiaobo (CHN)	2
Elias El-Hidari (LIB)	1

Final
Alisher Gulov (TJK)	6
Liu Xiaobo (CHN)	9
3rd place
Akmal Irgashev (UZB)	7
Elias El-Hidari (LIB)	3

== Women ==
=== −49 kg ===
26 November

Round of 16
Stefhani Elizabet (INA)	DQ
~~Samdansürengiin Yanjinlkham (MGL)~~
Shum Pui Shan (HKG)	11
Chimi Wangmo (BHU)	4
Tio Jia Xin (SIN)	3
Elaine Teo (MAS)	10
Kristina Korobko (TJK)	6
Nila Ahmadi (AFG)	5
Deena Mahboob (BRN)	1
Latika Bhandari (IND)	10

Quarterfinals
Erika Kasahara (JPN)	9
Stefhani Elizabet (INA)	4
Shum Pui Shan (HKG)	1
Elaine Teo (MAS)	15
Dana Haidar (JOR)	7
Kristina Korobko (TJK)	0
Latika Bhandari (IND)	1
Chanatip Sonkham (THA)	13

Semifinals
Erika Kasahara (JPN)	9
Elaine Teo (MAS)	6
Dana Haidar (JOR)	1
Chanatip Sonkham (THA)	8

Final
Erika Kasahara (JPN)	1
Chanatip Sonkham (THA)	8
3rd place
Elaine Teo (MAS)	9
Dana Haidar (JOR)	12

=== −57 kg ===
27 November

Round of 16
Andrea Paoli (LIB)	7
Nguyễn Thị Đường (VIE)	2
Aarti Khakal (IND)	11
Somaeh Gholami (AFG)	12
Kaltham Jasim (BRN)	DQ
~~Haya Jumaa (UAE)~~
Chhoeung Puthearim (CAM)	WD
Nurul Nadia Mahamat (MAS)
Mayu Hamada (JPN)	16
Camille Manalo (PHI)	4
Wu Sze Ngo (HKG)	6
Ayasha Shakya (NEP)	11
Nuri Revani Siregar (INA)	7
Dilobar Saydullaeva (UZB)	11
Padi Gamage (SRI)	2
Rangsiya Nisaisom (THA)	14

Quarterfinals
Andrea Paoli (LIB)	14
Somaeh Gholami (AFG)	2
Kaltham Jasim (BRN)	3
Chhoeung Puthearim (CAM)	8
Mayu Hamada (JPN)	18
Ayasha Shakya (NEP)	2
Dilobar Saydullaeva (UZB)	6
Rangsiya Nisaisom (THA)	7

Semifinals
Andrea Paoli (LIB)	6
Chhoeung Puthearim (CAM)	1
Mayu Hamada (JPN)	8
Rangsiya Nisaisom (THA)	9

Final
Andrea Paoli (LIB)	2
Rangsiya Nisaisom (THA)	6
3rd place
Chhoeung Puthearim (CAM)	4
Mayu Hamada (JPN)	11

=== −67 kg ===
27 November

Quarterfinals
Gulnafis Aitmukhambetova (KAZ)	24
Asia Batool (PAK)	6
Sousan Hajipour (IRI)	18
Karma Dema (BHU)	0
Keshia Suhail (SRI)	3
Chu Hoàng Diệu Linh (VIE)	11
~~Kirstie Alora (PHI)~~
Manita Shahi (NEP)	DQ

Semifinals
Gulnafis Aitmukhambetova (KAZ)	4
Sousan Hajipour (IRI)	16
Chu Hoàng Diệu Linh (VIE)	5
Manita Shahi (NEP)	3

Final
Sousan Hajipour (IRI)	WD
Chu Hoàng Diệu Linh (VIE)
3rd place
Gulnafis Aitmukhambetova (KAZ)	3
Manita Shahi (NEP)	2

=== +67 kg ===
26 November

Quarterfinals
Feruza Yergeshova (KAZ)	DQ
~~Maitha Al-Maktoum (UAE)~~
Jacqueline Quek (SIN)	5
Sorn Davin (CAM)	8
Natalya Mamatova (UZB)	17
Najia Khan (PAK)	0
Fatemeh Rouhani (IRI)	1
Nadin Dawani (JOR)	8

Semifinals
Feruza Yergeshova (KAZ)	16
Sorn Davin (CAM)	15
Natalya Mamatova (UZB)	7
Nadin Dawani (JOR)	8

Final
Feruza Yergeshova (KAZ)	9
Nadin Dawani (JOR)	12
3rd place
Sorn Davin (CAM)	3
Natalya Mamatova (UZB)	4
