= Taekwondo at the 2010 Asian Games – Women's 57 kg =

Taekwondo at the Asian Games

Women's 57 kg at the 2010 Asian Games
- Venue: Guangdong Gymnasium
- Date: 18 November 2010
- Competitors: 18 from 18 nations

Medalists
gold medal	Lee Sung-hye	South Korea
silver medal	Hou Yuzhuo	China
bronze medal	Sousan Hajipour	Iran
bronze medal	Andrea Paoli	Lebanon

The women's featherweight (−57 kilograms) event at the 2010 Asian Games took place on 18 November 2010 at Guangdong Gymnasium, Guangzhou, China.

== Schedule ==
All times are China Standard Time (UTC+08:00)

Date	Time	Event
Thursday, 18 November 2010	09:00	1/16 finals
Thursday, 18 November 2010	09:00	1/8 finals
Thursday, 18 November 2010	14:00	Quarterfinals
Thursday, 18 November 2010	14:00	Semifinals
Thursday, 18 November 2010	16:30	Final

== Results ==
Legend

- W — Won by withdrawal

=== Final ===
Final
Hou Yuzhuo (CHN)	0
Lee Sung-hye (KOR)	0

=== Top half ===
1/16 finals
Basma Ahmed (UAE)	5
Sabina Maharjan (NEP)	4

1/8 finals
Hou Yuzhuo (CHN)	10
Basma Ahmed (UAE)	0
Kezang Lhamo (BHU)	0
Y. Shantibala Devi (IND)	7
Aida Lemos (TLS)	2
Yekaterina Dmitriyeva (KAZ)	19^{W}
Karla Alava (PHI)	1
Sousan Hajipour (IRI)	7

Quarterfinals
Hou Yuzhuo (CHN)	13
Y. Shantibala Devi (IND)	0
Yekaterina Dmitriyeva (KAZ)	7
Sousan Hajipour (IRI)	8

Semifinals
Hou Yuzhuo (CHN)	3
Sousan Hajipour (IRI)	0

=== Bottom half ===
1/16 finals
Lee Sung-hye (KOR)	12
Marah Al-Sqour (JOR)	3

1/8 finals
Shraboni Biswas (BAN)	1
Andrea Paoli (LIB)	5
Nghiêm Thị Huyền (VIE)	14
Hadeel Fawzy (QAT)	1
Dilobar Saydullaeva (UZB)	1
Tseng Pei-hua (TPE)	3
Lee Sung-hye (KOR)	8
Rangsiya Nisaisom (THA)	1

Quarterfinals
Andrea Paoli (LIB)	2
Nghiêm Thị Huyền (VIE)	1
Tseng Pei-hua (TPE)	1
Lee Sung-hye (KOR)	2

Semifinals
Andrea Paoli (LIB)	1
Lee Sung-hye (KOR)	4
