= Taekwondo at the 2010 Asian Games – Men's 54 kg =

Taekwondo competition

Men's 54 kg at the 2010 Asian Games
- Venue: Guangdong Gymnasium
- Date: 20 November 2010
- Competitors: 23 from 23 nations

Medalists
| gold medal | Chutchawal Khawlaor | Thailand |
| silver medal | Kim Seong-ho | South Korea |
| bronze medal | Japoy Lizardo | Philippines |
| bronze medal | Hsu Chia-lin | Chinese Taipei |

The men's finweight (−54 kilograms) event at the 2010 Asian Games took place on 20 November 2010 at Guangdong Gymnasium, Guangzhou, China.

== Schedule ==
All times are China Standard Time (UTC+08:00)

| Date | Time | Event |
|---|---|---|
| Saturday, 20 November 2010 | 09:00 | 1/16 finals |
| Saturday, 20 November 2010 | 09:00 | 1/8 finals |
| Saturday, 20 November 2010 | 14:00 | Quarterfinals |
| Saturday, 20 November 2010 | 14:00 | Semifinals |
| Saturday, 20 November 2010 | 16:30 | Final |

== Results ==
Legend

- W — Won by withdrawal

=== Final ===
| Final |
| Kim Seong-ho (KOR) | 6 |
| Chutchawal Khawlaor (THA) | 8 |

=== Top half ===
1/16 finals
Nariman Shakirov (KAZ) | 19
Mateus Soares (TLS) | 5
Khalid Al-Malki (KSA) | 0
Kim Seong-ho (KOR) | 16
Lakpa Tashi Sherpa (BHU) | 5
Sunil Kumar (IND) | 12

1/8 finals
Ajaiman Al-Ojaiman (IOC) | 6
Nariman Shakirov (KAZ) | 4
Tameem Al-Kubati (YEM) | 4
Japoy Lizardo (PHI) | 6
Kumar Manandhar (NEP) | 0
Kim Seong-ho (KOR) | 13
Sunil Kumar (IND) | 2
Abdulrahim Abdulhameed (BRN) | 8

Quarterfinals
Ajaiman Al-Ojaiman (IOC) | 4
Japoy Lizardo (PHI) | 9
Kim Seong-ho (KOR) | 1^{W}
Abdulrahim Abdulhameed (BRN) | 0

Semifinals
Japoy Lizardo (PHI) | 7
Kim Seong-ho (KOR) | 10

=== Bottom half ===
1/16 finals
Takaya Nakagawa (JPN) | 3
Chutchawal Khawlaor (THA) | 5
Nguyễn Hữu Nhân (VIE) | 6
Mohammad Al-Bakhit (JOR) | 5
Douangsivilay Phimmasone (LAO) | 11
Ho Hou In (MAC) | 0
Eldiar Kosmambetov (KGZ) | 1
Hsu Chia-lin (TPE) | 17

1/8 finals
Sobir Nazaraliev (UZB) | 0
Chutchawal Khawlaor (THA) | 4
Nguyễn Hữu Nhân (VIE) | 13
Şohrat Orazgeldiýew (TKM) | 2
Chan Sovatha (CAM) | 2
Douangsivilay Phimmasone (LAO) | 14
Hsu Chia-lin (TPE) | 2
Marc Arakilo (LIB) | 1

Quarterfinals
Chutchawal Khawlaor (THA) | 9
Nguyễn Hữu Nhân (VIE) | 1
Douangsivilay Phimmasone (LAO) | 3
Hsu Chia-lin (TPE) | 9

Semifinals
Chutchawal Khawlaor (THA) | 7
Hsu Chia-lin (TPE) | 4
