= Taekwondo at the 2010 Asian Games – Men's 58 kg =

Taekwondo competition

Men's 58 kg at the 2010 Asian Games
- Venue: Guangdong Gymnasium
- Date: 20 November 2010
- Competitors: 22 from 22 nations

Medalists
gold medal	Wei Chen-yang	Chinese Taipei
silver medal	Pen-ek Karaket	Thailand
bronze medal	Xu Yongzeng	China
bronze medal	Paul Romero	Philippines

The men's flyweight (−58 kilograms) event at the 2010 Asian Games took place on 20 November 2010 at Guangdong Gymnasium, Guangzhou, China.

== Schedule ==
All times are China Standard Time (UTC+08:00)

Date	Time	Event
Saturday, 20 November 2010	09:00	1/16 finals
Saturday, 20 November 2010	09:00	1/8 finals
Saturday, 20 November 2010	14:00	Quarterfinals
Saturday, 20 November 2010	14:00	Semifinals
Saturday, 20 November 2010	16:30	Final

== Results ==
Legend

- W — Won by withdrawal

=== Final ===
Final
Pen-ek Karaket (THA)	2
Wei Chen-yang (TPE)	2

=== Top half ===
1/16 finals
Tshewang Tshewang (BHU)	5
Xu Yongzeng (CHN)	9
Hazza Sultan Al-Kalbani (UAE)	9
Rusfredy Tokan Petrus (MAS)	6
Pen-ek Karaket (THA)	13
Ng Wai Kin (MAC)	0

1/8 finals
Lê Huỳnh Châu (VIE)	3
Xu Yongzeng (CHN)	4
Davlatmurod Karimov (TJK)	4
Saad Al-Hubaidah (IOC)	1
Mohammad Tariq Fiaz (AFG)	4
Hazza Sultan Al-Kalbani (UAE)	3
Pen-ek Karaket (THA)	4
Zhalgas Bekkassymov (KAZ)	3

Quarterfinals
Xu Yongzeng (CHN)	6
Davlatmurod Karimov (TJK)	2
Mohammad Tariq Fiaz (AFG)	2
Pen-ek Karaket (THA)	13

Semifinals
Xu Yongzeng (CHN)	2
Pen-ek Karaket (THA)	6

=== Bottom half ===
1/16 finals
Sujan Pujari (NEP)	8
Khosbayaryn Bilgüün (MGL)	9
Paul Romero (PHI)	12
Mamdoh Al-Mowalad (KSA)	2
Phouthavong Outhasak (LAO)	0
Yaser Bamatraf (YEM)	1

1/8 finals
Ebrahim Abdulhameed (BRN)	3
Khosbayaryn Bilgüün (MGL)	5
Paul Romero (PHI)	13
Jason Tan (SIN)	2
Wei Chen-yang (TPE)	14
Chhoy Bouthorn (CAM)	1
Yaser Bamatraf (YEM)	1
Rustamjon Pulatov (UZB)	3

Quarterfinals
Khosbayaryn Bilgüün (MGL)	5
Paul Romero (PHI)	5
Wei Chen-yang (TPE)	7
Rustamjon Pulatov (UZB)	0

Semifinals
Paul Romero (PHI)	0
Wei Chen-yang (TPE)	5^{W}
