= Taekwondo at the 2010 Asian Games – Women's 49 kg =

Taekwondo competition

Women's 49 kg at the 2010 Asian Games
- Venue: Guangdong Gymnasium
- Date: 17 November 2010
- Competitors: 11 from 11 nations

Medalists
gold medal	Wu Jingyu	China
silver medal	Erika Kasahara	Japan
bronze medal	Vũ Thị Hậu	Vietnam
bronze medal	Chanatip Sonkham	Thailand

The women's flyweight (−49 kilograms) event at the 2010 Asian Games took place on 17 November 2010 at Guangdong Gymnasium, Guangzhou, China.

At the first round, Yang Shu-chun of Chinese Taipei was controversially disqualified near the end of the first period when she was leading 9-0 against her Vietnamese opponent Vũ Thị Hậu. "Unauthorized" electronic sensors were allegedly found in her socks before or during the match. Yang's equipment had passed the pre-match inspection. After the disqualification, Yang protested the judgement in tears and refused to leave the mat. Yang's disqualification drew a furious response from media and fans in Taiwan.

== Schedule ==
All times are China Standard Time (UTC+08:00)

Date	Time	Event
Wednesday, 17 November 2010	09:00	1/8 finals
Wednesday, 17 November 2010	14:00	Quarterfinals
Wednesday, 17 November 2010	14:00	Semifinals
Wednesday, 17 November 2010	16:30	Final

== Results ==
Legend

- DQ — Won by disqualification
- R — Won by referee stop contest

1/8 finals
Vũ Thị Hậu (VIE)	0^{DQ}
Yang Shu-chun (TPE)	9
Jyra Lizardo (PHI)	3
Elaine Teo (MAS)	6
Raya Hatahet (JOR)	6
Manivanh Khounviseth (LAO)	4

Quarterfinals
Laxmi Rana (NEP)	0
Vũ Thị Hậu (VIE)	10
Luisa Rosa (TLS)	1
Erika Kasahara (JPN)	26^{R}
Chanatip Sonkham (THA)	6
Elaine Teo (MAS)	3
Raya Hatahet (JOR)	2
Wu Jingyu (CHN)	20

Semifinals
Vũ Thị Hậu (VIE)	0
Erika Kasahara (JPN)	5
Chanatip Sonkham (THA)	0
Wu Jingyu (CHN)	5

Final
Erika Kasahara (JPN)	1
Wu Jingyu (CHN)	13
