= Taekwondo at the 2010 Asian Games – Men's +87 kg =

Taekwondo competition

Men's +87 kg at the 2010 Asian Games
- Venue: Guangdong Gymnasium
- Date: 18 November 2010
- Competitors: 11 from 11 nations

Medalists
| gold medal | Heo Jun-nyung | South Korea |
| silver medal | Zheng Yi | China |
| bronze medal | Arman Chilmanov | Kazakhstan |
| bronze medal | Akmal Irgashev | Uzbekistan |

The men's heavyweight (+87 kilograms) event at the 2010 Asian Games took place on 18 November 2010 at Guangdong Gymnasium, Guangzhou, China.

A total of 11 men from 11 countries competed in this event, limited to fighters whose body weight was more than 87 kilograms.

Heo Jun-nyung of South Korea won the gold medal after beating Zheng Yi of China in gold medal match 11–4, The bronze medal was shared by Arman Chilmanov of Kazakhstan and Akmal Irgashev from Uzbekistan.

== Schedule ==
All times are China Standard Time (UTC+08:00)

| Date | Time | Event |
|---|---|---|
| Thursday, 18 November 2010 | 09:00 | 1/8 finals |
| Thursday, 18 November 2010 | 14:00 | Quarterfinals |
| Thursday, 18 November 2010 | 14:00 | Semifinals |
| Thursday, 18 November 2010 | 16:30 | Final |

== Results ==
Legend

- W — Won by withdrawal

1/8 finals
Hossein Tajik (IRI) | W
Abdulqader Al-Adhami (QAT)
Heo Jun-nyung (KOR) | 9
Đinh Quang Đức (VIE) | 2
Akmal Irgashev (UZB) | 7
Shokirjon Rajabov (TJK) | 5

Quarterfinals
Arman Chilmanov (KAZ) | 0
Hossein Tajik (IRI) | 0
Zheng Yi (CHN) | 9
Mohammad Ayman (JOR) | 8
Elias El-Hidari (LIB) | 3
Heo Jun-nyung (KOR) | 6
Akmal Irgashev (UZB) | 18
Sandeep Kundu (IND) | 4

Semifinals
Arman Chilmanov (KAZ) | 13
Zheng Yi (CHN) | 15
Heo Jun-nyung (KOR) | 15
Akmal Irgashev (UZB) | 14

Final
Zheng Yi (CHN) | 4
Heo Jun-nyung (KOR) | 11
