= 2012 Asian Taekwondo Championships =

Taekwondo competition

- Venue: Phú Thọ Indoor Stadium
- Location: Ho Chi Minh City, Vietnam
- Dates: 9–11 May 2012

Champions
- Men: South Korea
- Women: Chinese Taipei

The 2012 Asian Taekwondo Championships are the 20th edition of the Asian Taekwondo Championships, and were held at Phú Thọ Indoor Stadium in Ho Chi Minh City, Vietnam from May 9 to May 11, 2012.

== Medal summary ==
=== Men ===
| Event | Gold | Silver | Bronze |
|---|---|---|---|
| Finweight −54 kg | Park Ji-woong; South Korea | Japoy Lizardo; Philippines | Ahmad Nabil; Indonesia |
| Finweight −54 kg | Park Ji-woong; South Korea | Japoy Lizardo; Philippines | Chutchawal Khawlaor; Thailand |
| Flyweight −58 kg | Lee Dae-hoon; South Korea | Pen-ek Karaket; Thailand | Lê Huỳnh Châu; Vietnam |
| Flyweight −58 kg | Lee Dae-hoon; South Korea | Pen-ek Karaket; Thailand | Yuma Yamada; Japan |
| Bantamweight −63 kg | Huang Cheng-ching; Chinese Taipei | Yaser Bamatraf; Yemen | Vladislav Khan; Uzbekistan |
| Bantamweight −63 kg | Huang Cheng-ching; Chinese Taipei | Yaser Bamatraf; Yemen | Zhalgas Bekkassymov; Kazakhstan |
| Featherweight −68 kg | Alireza Nasr Azadani; Iran | Rohullah Nikpai; Afghanistan | Said Gafar Salih; Qatar |
| Featherweight −68 kg | Alireza Nasr Azadani; Iran | Rohullah Nikpai; Afghanistan | Mohammad Abulibdeh; Jordan |
| Lightweight −74 kg | Anas Al-Adarbi; Jordan | Seo Jong-bin; South Korea | Masoud Karimi; Afghanistan |
| Lightweight −74 kg | Anas Al-Adarbi; Jordan | Seo Jong-bin; South Korea | Kairat Sarymsakov; Kazakhstan |
| Welterweight −80 kg | Lee Dong-eon; South Korea | Masoud Hajji-Zavareh; Iran | Qiao Sen; China |
| Welterweight −80 kg | Lee Dong-eon; South Korea | Masoud Hajji-Zavareh; Iran | Christian dela Cruz; Philippines |
| Middleweight −87 kg | Nguyễn Trọng Cường; Vietnam | Jasur Baykuziyev; Uzbekistan | Jaber Jamal Al-Ali; United Arab Emirates |
| Middleweight −87 kg | Nguyễn Trọng Cường; Vietnam | Jasur Baykuziyev; Uzbekistan | Hossein Tajik; Iran |
| Heavyweight +87 kg | Cha Dong-min; South Korea | Liu Xiaobo; China | Sajjad Mardani; Iran |
| Heavyweight +87 kg | Cha Dong-min; South Korea | Liu Xiaobo; China | Elias El-Hidari; Lebanon |

=== Women ===
| Event | Gold | Silver | Bronze |
|---|---|---|---|
| Finweight −46 kg | Liao Wei-chun; Chinese Taipei | Li Zhaoyi; China | Kim So-hui; South Korea |
| Finweight −46 kg | Liao Wei-chun; Chinese Taipei | Li Zhaoyi; China | Dina Pouryounes; Iran |
| Flyweight −49 kg | Yang Shu-chun; Chinese Taipei | Đoàn Thị Hương Giang; Vietnam | Chanatip Sonkham; Thailand |
| Flyweight −49 kg | Yang Shu-chun; Chinese Taipei | Đoàn Thị Hương Giang; Vietnam | Park Ji-hye; South Korea |
| Bantamweight −53 kg | Wu Jingyu; China | Samaneh Sheshpari; Iran | Nila Ahmadi; Afghanistan |
| Bantamweight −53 kg | Wu Jingyu; China | Samaneh Sheshpari; Iran | Tseng Yi-hsuan; Chinese Taipei |
| Featherweight −57 kg | Tseng Li-cheng; Chinese Taipei | Hou Yuzhuo; China | Mayu Hamada; Japan |
| Featherweight −57 kg | Tseng Li-cheng; Chinese Taipei | Hou Yuzhuo; China | Dilobar Saydullaeva; Uzbekistan |
| Lightweight −62 kg | Zhang Hua; China | Chuang Chia-chia; Chinese Taipei | Nguyễn Thị Thanh Thảo; Vietnam |
| Lightweight −62 kg | Zhang Hua; China | Chuang Chia-chia; Chinese Taipei | Zhadyra Otemis; Kazakhstan |
| Welterweight −67 kg | Chen Yann-yeu; Chinese Taipei | Hwang Kyung-seon; South Korea | Fatemeh Rouhani; Iran |
| Welterweight −67 kg | Chen Yann-yeu; Chinese Taipei | Hwang Kyung-seon; South Korea | Liu Qing; Macau |
| Middleweight −73 kg | Lee In-jong; South Korea | Rima Ananbeh; Jordan | Kirstie Alora; Philippines |
| Middleweight −73 kg | Lee In-jong; South Korea | Rima Ananbeh; Jordan | Feruza Yergeshova; Kazakhstan |
| Heavyweight +73 kg | Nadin Dawani; Jordan | Fei Lulu; China | Eka Sahara; Indonesia |
| Heavyweight +73 kg | Nadin Dawani; Jordan | Fei Lulu; China | Nafiseh Mokhlesi; Iran |

== Medal table ==
| Rank | Nation | Gold | Silver | Bronze | Total |
|---|---|---|---|---|---|
| 1 | South Korea | 5 | 2 | 2 | 9 |
| 2 | Chinese Taipei | 5 | 1 | 1 | 7 |
| 3 | China | 2 | 4 | 1 | 7 |
| 4 | Jordan | 2 | 1 | 1 | 4 |
| 5 | Iran | 1 | 2 | 5 | 8 |
| 6 | Vietnam | 1 | 1 | 2 | 4 |
| 7 | Afghanistan | 0 | 1 | 2 | 3 |
| 7 | Philippines | 0 | 1 | 2 | 3 |
| 7 | Thailand | 0 | 1 | 2 | 3 |
| 7 | Uzbekistan | 0 | 1 | 2 | 3 |
| 11 | Yemen | 0 | 1 | 0 | 1 |
| 12 | Kazakhstan | 0 | 0 | 4 | 4 |
| 13 | Indonesia | 0 | 0 | 2 | 2 |
| 13 | Japan | 0 | 0 | 2 | 2 |
| 15 | Lebanon | 0 | 0 | 1 | 1 |
| 15 | Macau | 0 | 0 | 1 | 1 |
| 15 | Qatar | 0 | 0 | 1 | 1 |
| 15 | United Arab Emirates | 0 | 0 | 1 | 1 |
| Totals (18 entries) | | 16 | 16 | 32 | 64 |

== Team ranking ==
=== Men ===
| Rank | Team | Points |
|---|---|---|
| 1 | South Korea | 62 |
| 2 | Iran | 29 |
| 3 | Jordan | 18 |
| 4 | Vietnam | 16 |
| 5 | Thailand | 13 |
| 6 | Chinese Taipei | 13 |
| 7 | Afghanistan | 12 |
| 8 | Philippines | 12 |
| 9 | China | 10 |
| 10 | Uzbekistan | 10 |

=== Women ===
| Rank | Team | Points |
|---|---|---|
| 1 | Chinese Taipei | 63 |
| 2 | China | 47 |
| 3 | South Korea | 24 |
| 4 | Iran | 15 |
| 5 | Jordan | 13 |
| 6 | Vietnam | 10 |
| 7 | Kazakhstan | 6 |
| 8 | Thailand | 4 |
| 9 | Uzbekistan | 4 |
| 10 | Japan | 4 |
