= Raheleh Asemani =

Belgian taekwondo athlete

Personal information
- Born: 21 June 1989 (age 37) Karaj, Iran
Medal record
Women's taekwondo
Representing Iran
Asian Games
Silver medal – second place	2010 Guangzhou	62 kg
Representing Belgium
European Championships
Bronze medal – third place	2021 Sofia	57 kg
Bronze medal – third place	2016 Montreux	57 kg

Raheleh Asemani (Persian: راحله آسمانی, born 21 June 1989) is an Iranian-born taekwondo practitioner who competes internationally for Belgium. She participated at the 2016 Summer Olympics. She has a history of participating in the Asian games.

== Personal life ==
Asemani was born on 21 June 1989 in Karaj, Iran. Asemani left Iran as a refugee in 2012 and settled in Belgium where she works for the postal service. In April 2016 she was granted Belgian citizenship.

== Taekwondo ==
Representing Iran she won a silver medal at the 2010 Asian Games in the women's 62 kg division after losing to Noh Eun-sil in the final.

As she had not yet gained Belgian citizenship Asemani was suggested as a potential competitor for the team of Refugee Olympic Athletes for the 2016 Summer Olympics in Rio de Janeiro, Brazil. She was allowed to compete at the 2016 European Taekwondo Olympic Qualification Tournament held in Istanbul, Turkey, under the flag of the governing body, the World Taekwondo Federation, as an independent athlete. Competing in the women's −57 kg weight division she advanced to the final of the tournament where she faced Suvi Mikkonen of Finland. Asemani won the bout 7–4 to earn her qualification for the event in Rio as a refugee competitor. After she was granted Belgian citizenship she applied to compete instead for the Belgian team, with International Olympic Committee (IOC) President Thomas Bach saying that such permission would be granted. As such she was not named as part of the ten athlete squad for the refugee team.

At the 2016 European Taekwondo Championships held in Montreux, Switzerland, Asemani represented Belgium and won a bronze medal behind Great Britain's Jade Jones and Sweden's Nikita Glasnovic. During the tournament both Asemani and Jones, along with British-born Moldovan Aaron Cook, were named by the World Taekwondo Federation as the sport's first three humanitarian ambassadors.

She competed in the women's featherweight event at the 2022 World Taekwondo Championships held in Guadalajara, Mexico.
