= Taekwondo at the 2010 Asian Games – Women's 62 kg =

Taekwondo competition

Women's 62 kg at the 2010 Asian Games
- Venue: Guangdong Gymnasium
- Date: 19 November 2010
- Competitors: 12 from 12 nations

Medalists
gold medal	Noh Eun-sil	South Korea
silver medal	Raheleh Asemani	Iran
bronze medal	Dhunyanun Premwaew	Thailand
bronze medal	Chang Chiung-fang	Chinese Taipei

The women's lightweight (−62 kilograms) event at the 2010 Asian Games took place on 19 November 2010 at Guangdong Gymnasium, Guangzhou, China.

A total of twelve competitors from twelve countries competed in this event, limited to fighters whose body weight was less than 62 kilograms.

Noh Eun-sil of South Korea won the gold medal after beating Raheleh Asemani of Iran in gold medal match 14–2, The bronze medal was shared by Dhunyanun Premwaew of Thailand and Chang Chiung-fang from Chinese Taipei.

The bronze medalist Dhunyanun Premwaew had participated in two previous editions and won two silver medals under her former name Chonnapas Premwaew.

== Schedule ==
All times are China Standard Time (UTC+08:00)

Date	Time	Event
Friday, 19 November 2010	09:00	1/8 finals
Friday, 19 November 2010	14:00	Quarterfinals
Friday, 19 November 2010	14:00	Semifinals
Friday, 19 November 2010	16:30	Final

== Results ==
1/8 finals
Raheleh Asemani (IRI)	13
Takhmina Khojaeva (TJK)	3
Camille Manalo (PHI)	2
Dhunyanun Premwaew (THA)	5
Noh Eun-sil (KOR)	9
Nguyễn Thị Đường (VIE)	2
Srishti Singh (IND)	5
Shaden Thweib (JOR)	7

Quarterfinals
Manita Shahi (NEP)	4
Raheleh Asemani (IRI)	5
Dhunyanun Premwaew (THA)	11
Ririn Agustina (INA)	0
Elvira Kadyrbayeva (KAZ)	2
Noh Eun-sil (KOR)	24
Shaden Thweib (JOR)	1
Chang Chiung-fang (TPE)	4

Semifinals
Raheleh Asemani (IRI)	6
Dhunyanun Premwaew (THA)	2
Noh Eun-sil (KOR)	4
Chang Chiung-fang (TPE)	3

Final
Raheleh Asemani (IRI)	2
Noh Eun-sil (KOR)	14
