= Chutchawal Khawlaor =

Thai taekwondo practitioner

Personal information
- Nationality: Thailand
- Born: January 17, 1988 (age 38) Pathum Thani, Thailand

Sport
- Weight class: Finweight
Medal record
Men's taekwondo
Representing Thailand
| Event | 1st | 2nd | 3rd |
|---|---|---|---|
| Olympic Games | 0 | 0 | 0 |
| World Taekwondo Championships | 1 | 1 | 1 |
| Asian Games | 1 | 0 | 0 |
| Asian Taekwondo Championships | 2 | 0 | 1 |
| Total | 4 | 1 | 2 |
World Championships
| Gold medal – first place | 2011 Gyeongju | 54 kg |
| Silver medal – second place | 2007 Beijing | 54 kg |
| Bronze medal – third place | 2009 Copenhagen | 54 kg |
Asian Games
| Gold medal – first place | 2010 Guangzhou | 54 kg |
Asian Championships
| Gold medal – first place | 2006 Bangkok | 54 kg |
| Gold medal – first place | 2010 Astana | 54 kg |
| Bronze medal – third place | 2012 Ho Chi Minh City | 54 kg |
Universiade
| Gold medal – first place | 2007 Bangkok | 54 kg |
| Bronze medal – third place | 2009 Belgrade | 54 kg |
Southeast Asian Games
| Gold medal – first place | 2007 Nakhon Ratchasima | 54 kg |
| Gold medal – first place | 2011 Jakarta-Palembang | 54 kg |
| Silver medal – second place | 2005 Manila | 54 kg |
World Combat Games
| Bronze medal – third place | 2010 Beijing | 58 kg |
Student World Championships
| Gold medal – first place | Valencia 2006 | 54 kg |
Asian Junior Championships
| Gold medal – first place | Ho Chi Minh City 2003 | 45 kg |
| Gold medal – first place | Almatx 2005 | 51 kg |

Chutchawal Khawlaor (Thai: ชัชวาล ขาวละออ; RTGS: Chatchawan Khaola-o, born January 17, 1988) is a Thai taekwondo practitioner.

Khawlaor also be a volunteer for Ruamkatanyu Foundation.
