= 2006 Asian Taekwondo Championships =

Taekwondo competition

- Venue: Indoor Stadium Huamark
- Location: Bangkok, Thailand
- Dates: 21–23 April 2006

Champions
- Men: South Korea
- Women: South Korea

The 2006 Asian Taekwondo Championships are the 17th edition of the Asian Taekwondo Championships, and were held in Bangkok, Thailand from April 21 to April 23, 2006.

== Medal summary ==
=== Men ===
Event	Gold	Silver	Bronze
Finweight −54 kg	Chutchawal Khawlaor; Thailand	Japoy Lizardo; Philippines	Wisam Oraibi; Iraq
Finweight −54 kg	Chutchawal Khawlaor; Thailand	Japoy Lizardo; Philippines	Renat Kuralbayev; Kazakhstan
Flyweight −58 kg	You Young-dae; South Korea	Dech Sutthikunkarn; Thailand	Batyrbek Yestavletov; Kazakhstan
Flyweight −58 kg	You Young-dae; South Korea	Dech Sutthikunkarn; Thailand	Chu Mu-yen; Chinese Taipei
Bantamweight −62 kg	Park Tae-youl; South Korea	Nacha Punthong; Thailand	Mohammad Reza Mehdizadeh; Iran
Bantamweight −62 kg	Park Tae-youl; South Korea	Nacha Punthong; Thailand	Thamer Qaitouqah; Jordan
Featherweight −67 kg	Lee Mun-kyu; South Korea	Jamil Al-Khuffash; Jordan	Tseng Ching-hsiang; Chinese Taipei
Featherweight −67 kg	Lee Mun-kyu; South Korea	Jamil Al-Khuffash; Jordan	Manuel Rivero; Philippines
Lightweight −72 kg	Hadi Saei; Iran	Deyaa Al-Dah; Syria	Wu Yi-chun; Chinese Taipei
Lightweight −72 kg	Hadi Saei; Iran	Deyaa Al-Dah; Syria	Lee Young-yeoul; South Korea
Welterweight −78 kg	Kourosh Rajoli; Iran	Choi Seong-ho; South Korea	Liao Chia-hsing; Chinese Taipei
Welterweight −78 kg	Kourosh Rajoli; Iran	Choi Seong-ho; South Korea	Alexander Briones; Philippines
Middleweight −84 kg	Arman Chilmanov; Kazakhstan	Adam Corrigan; Australia	Nguyễn Trọng Cường; Vietnam
Middleweight −84 kg	Arman Chilmanov; Kazakhstan	Adam Corrigan; Australia	Abdelhameed Atalla; Qatar
Heavyweight +84 kg	Nam Yun-bae; South Korea	Abdulqader Al-Adhami; Qatar	Nguyễn Văn Hùng; Vietnam
Heavyweight +84 kg	Nam Yun-bae; South Korea	Abdulqader Al-Adhami; Qatar	Sagynysh Kalimbetov; Kazakhstan

=== Women ===
Event	Gold	Silver	Bronze
Finweight −47 kg	Yaowapa Boorapolchai; Thailand	Wu Jingyu; China	Kristina Korobko; Tajikistan
Finweight −47 kg	Yaowapa Boorapolchai; Thailand	Wu Jingyu; China	Awatef Al-Assaf; Jordan
Flyweight −51 kg	Kwon Eun-kyung; South Korea	Đỗ Thị Bích Hạnh; Vietnam	Wala Al-Hashimi; Bahrain
Flyweight −51 kg	Kwon Eun-kyung; South Korea	Đỗ Thị Bích Hạnh; Vietnam	Eunice Alora; Philippines
Bantamweight −55 kg	Lee Hye-young; South Korea	Ekaterina Trubitsina; Tajikistan	Cosette Basbous; Lebanon
Bantamweight −55 kg	Lee Hye-young; South Korea	Ekaterina Trubitsina; Tajikistan	Chi Shu-ju; Chinese Taipei
Featherweight −59 kg	Tseng Pei-hua; Chinese Taipei	Chonnapas Premwaew; Thailand	Lee Sung-hye; South Korea
Featherweight −59 kg	Tseng Pei-hua; Chinese Taipei	Chonnapas Premwaew; Thailand	Zarina Shamshatkyzy; Kazakhstan
Lightweight −63 kg	Jin Chae-lin; South Korea	Su Li-wen; Chinese Taipei	Yekaterina Dmitriyeva; Kazakhstan
Lightweight −63 kg	Jin Chae-lin; South Korea	Su Li-wen; Chinese Taipei	Shaden Thweib; Jordan
Welterweight −67 kg	Chen Ri Xian; Macau	Hwang Kyung-seon; South Korea	Tina Morgan; Australia
Welterweight −67 kg	Chen Ri Xian; Macau	Hwang Kyung-seon; South Korea	Yoriko Okamoto; Japan
Middleweight −72 kg	Jung Sun-young; South Korea	Liu Rui; China	Mahrouz Saei; Iran
Middleweight −72 kg	Jung Sun-young; South Korea	Liu Rui; China	Tsui Fang-hsuan; Chinese Taipei
Heavyweight +72 kg	Rapatkorn Prasopsuk; Thailand	Luo Wei; China	Amalia Kurniasih Palupi; Indonesia
Heavyweight +72 kg	Rapatkorn Prasopsuk; Thailand	Luo Wei; China	Nadin Dawani; Jordan

== Medal table ==
Rank	Nation	Gold	Silver	Bronze	Total
1	South Korea	8	2	2	12
2	Thailand	3	3	0	6
3	Iran	2	0	2	4
4	Chinese Taipei	1	1	6	8
5	Kazakhstan	1	0	5	6
6	Macau	1	0	0	1
7	China	0	3	0	3
8	Jordan	0	1	4	5
9	Philippines	0	1	3	4
10	Vietnam	0	1	2	3
11	Australia	0	1	1	2
11	Qatar	0	1	1	2
11	Tajikistan	0	1	1	2
14	Syria	0	1	0	1
15	Bahrain	0	0	1	1
15	Indonesia	0	0	1	1
15	Iraq	0	0	1	1
15	Japan	0	0	1	1
15	Lebanon	0	0	1	1
Totals (19 entries)		16	16	32	64
