= 2010 Asian Taekwondo Championships =

Taekwondo competition

- Venue: Daulet Sport Complex
- Location: Astana, Kazakhstan
- Dates: 21–23 May 2010

Champions
- Men: Iran
- Women: South Korea

The 2010 Asian Taekwondo Championships were the 19th edition of the Asian Taekwondo Championships, and were held in Astana, Kazakhstan from May 21 to May 23, 2010.

== Medal summary ==
=== Men ===
Event	Gold	Silver	Bronze
Finweight −54 kg	Chutchawal Khawlaor; Thailand	Japoy Lizardo; Philippines	Nariman Shakirov; Kazakhstan
Finweight −54 kg	Chutchawal Khawlaor; Thailand	Japoy Lizardo; Philippines	Sobir Nazaraliev; Uzbekistan
Flyweight −58 kg	Pen-ek Karaket; Thailand	Wei Chen-yang; Chinese Taipei	Xu Yongzeng; China
Flyweight −58 kg	Pen-ek Karaket; Thailand	Wei Chen-yang; Chinese Taipei	Pheruz Sattarov; Uzbekistan
Bantamweight −63 kg	Ham Kyu-hwan; South Korea	Chu Yuan-chih; Chinese Taipei	Reza Naderian; Iran
Bantamweight −63 kg	Ham Kyu-hwan; South Korea	Chu Yuan-chih; Chinese Taipei	Zainobiddin Nazaraliev; Uzbekistan
Featherweight −68 kg	Mohammad Bagheri Motamed; Iran	Jang Se-wook; South Korea	Mohammad Abulibdeh; Jordan
Featherweight −68 kg	Mohammad Bagheri Motamed; Iran	Jang Se-wook; South Korea	Lê Huỳnh Châu; Vietnam
Lightweight −74 kg	Farzad Abdollahi; Iran	Kim Bae-hoon; South Korea	Dmitriy Kim; Uzbekistan
Lightweight −74 kg	Farzad Abdollahi; Iran	Kim Bae-hoon; South Korea	Li Lai; China
Welterweight −80 kg	Masoud Hajji-Zavareh; Iran	Alisher Gulov; Tajikistan	Sultan Kassymov; Kazakhstan
Welterweight −80 kg	Masoud Hajji-Zavareh; Iran	Alisher Gulov; Tajikistan	Marlon Avenido; Philippines
Middleweight −87 kg	Jung Young-han; South Korea	Yousef Karami; Iran	Yazan Al-Sadeq; Jordan
Middleweight −87 kg	Jung Young-han; South Korea	Yousef Karami; Iran	Yin Zhimeng; China
Heavyweight +87 kg	Hossein Tajik; Iran	Arman Chilmanov; Kazakhstan	Abdulqader Al-Adhami; Qatar
Heavyweight +87 kg	Hossein Tajik; Iran	Arman Chilmanov; Kazakhstan	Kim Jung-soo; South Korea

=== Women ===
Event	Gold	Silver	Bronze
Finweight −46 kg	Jeon Seo-yeon; South Korea	Yu Hu-chia; Chinese Taipei	Dana Haidar; Jordan
Finweight −46 kg	Jeon Seo-yeon; South Korea	Yu Hu-chia; Chinese Taipei	Aizhan Alizhanova; Kazakhstan
Flyweight −49 kg	Wu Jingyu; China	Erika Kasahara; Japan	Chanatip Sonkham; Thailand
Flyweight −49 kg	Wu Jingyu; China	Erika Kasahara; Japan	Yang Shu-chun; Chinese Taipei
Bantamweight −53 kg	Lei Jie; China	Samaneh Sheshpari; Iran	Lee Su-ji; South Korea
Bantamweight −53 kg	Lei Jie; China	Samaneh Sheshpari; Iran	Shahd Al-Tarman; Jordan
Featherweight −57 kg	Tseng Pei-hua; Chinese Taipei	Hou Yuzhuo; China	Sousan Hajipour; Iran
Featherweight −57 kg	Tseng Pei-hua; Chinese Taipei	Hou Yuzhuo; China	Jung Jin-hee; South Korea
Lightweight −62 kg	Kim Mi-kyung; South Korea	Chonnapas Premwaew; Thailand	Nghiêm Thị Huyền; Vietnam
Lightweight −62 kg	Kim Mi-kyung; South Korea	Chonnapas Premwaew; Thailand	Lia Karina Mansur; Indonesia
Welterweight −67 kg	Woo Seu-mi; South Korea	Dilobar Saydullaeva; Uzbekistan	Parisa Farshidi; Iran
Welterweight −67 kg	Woo Seu-mi; South Korea	Dilobar Saydullaeva; Uzbekistan	Chuang Chia-chia; Chinese Taipei
Middleweight −73 kg	Feruza Yergeshova; Kazakhstan	Han Yingying; China	Rapatkorn Prasopsuk; Thailand
Middleweight −73 kg	Feruza Yergeshova; Kazakhstan	Han Yingying; China	Sun Ai-chi; Chinese Taipei
Heavyweight +73 kg	Oh Hye-ri; South Korea	Evgeniya Karimova; Uzbekistan	Wang Junnan; Macau
Heavyweight +73 kg	Oh Hye-ri; South Korea	Evgeniya Karimova; Uzbekistan	Eka Sahara; Indonesia

== Medal table ==
Rank	Nation	Gold	Silver	Bronze	Total
1	South Korea	6	2	3	11
2	Iran	4	2	3	9
3	China	2	2	3	7
4	Thailand	2	1	2	5
5	Chinese Taipei	1	3	3	7
6	Kazakhstan	1	1	3	5
7	Uzbekistan	0	2	4	6
8	Philippines	0	1	1	2
9	Japan	0	1	0	1
9	Tajikistan	0	1	0	1
11	Jordan	0	0	4	4
12	Indonesia	0	0	2	2
12	Vietnam	0	0	2	2
14	Macau	0	0	1	1
14	Qatar	0	0	1	1
Totals (15 entries)		16	16	32	64

== Team ranking ==
=== Men ===
Rank	Team	Points
1	Iran	59
2	South Korea	42
3	Thailand	33

=== Women ===
Rank	Team	Points
1	South Korea	
2	China	
3	Chinese Taipei	
