= Taekwondo at the 2012 Summer Olympics – Women's 57 kg =

Taekwondo competition

Women's 57kg at the Games of the XXX Olympiad
- Venue: ExCeL Exhibition Centre
- Date: 9 August
- Competitors: 16 from 16 nations

Medalists
1st place, gold medalist(s)		Jade Jones	Great Britain
2nd place, silver medalist(s)		Hou Yuzhuo	China
3rd place, bronze medalist(s)		Marlène Harnois	France
3rd place, bronze medalist(s)		Tseng Li-Cheng	Chinese Taipei

The women's 57 kg competition at the 2012 Summer Olympics was held on 9 August, at the ExCeL Exhibition Centre.

== Competition format ==
The competition was held in a partial double-elimination format.

The main bracket consisted of a single elimination tournament, culminating in the gold medal match.

Two bronze medals were awarded at the Taekwondo competitions. A second repechage bracket was used to determine the bronze medal winners. Every competitor who lost to one of the two finalists competed in the repechage, again in single-elimination competition. Each semifinal loser faced the last remaining repechage competitor from the opposite half of the bracket in a bronze medal match.

== Schedule ==
All times are British Summer Time (UTC+1)

Date	Time	Round
Thursday, 9 August 2012	09:00; 15:00; 17:00; 22:15	Preliminary Round; Quarterfinals; Semifinals; Final

== Results ==
On 13 July 2012, the World Taekwondo Federation released the provisional draw which included the top eight seeds for the competition. The remainder of the qualified athletes were randomly drawn on 6 August 2012.

Preliminary round
1	Tseng Li-Cheng (TPE)	4
Rangsiya Nisaisom (THA)	1
Nidia Munoz (CUB)	2
8	Andrea Paoli (LIB)	4
5	Ana Zaninović (CRO)	11
Mayu Hamada (JPN)	14
Dragana Gladović (SRB)	1
4	Jade Jones (GBR)	15 (PTG)
3	Hedaya Wahba (EGY)	17
Robin Cheong (NZL)	6
Yeny Contreras Loyola (CHI)	3
6	Marlène Harnois (FRA)	14
7	Bineta Diédhiou (SEN)	6
Suvi Mikkonen (FIN)	9
Diana López (USA)	0
2	Hou Yuzhuo (CHN)	1 (SUD)

Quarterfinals
1	Tseng Li-Cheng (TPE)	5
8	Andrea Paoli (LIB)	2
Mayu Hamada (JPN)	3
4	Jade Jones (GBR)	13
3	Hedaya Wahba (EGY)	6
6	Marlène Harnois (FRA)	8
Suvi Mikkonen (FIN)	2
2	Hou Yuzhuo (CHN)	7

Semifinals
1	Tseng Li-Cheng (TPE)	6
4	Jade Jones (GBR)	10
6	Marlène Harnois (FRA)	3
2	Hou Yuzhuo (CHN)	8

Gold medal match
4	Jade Jones (GBR)	6
2	Hou Yuzhuo (CHN)	4

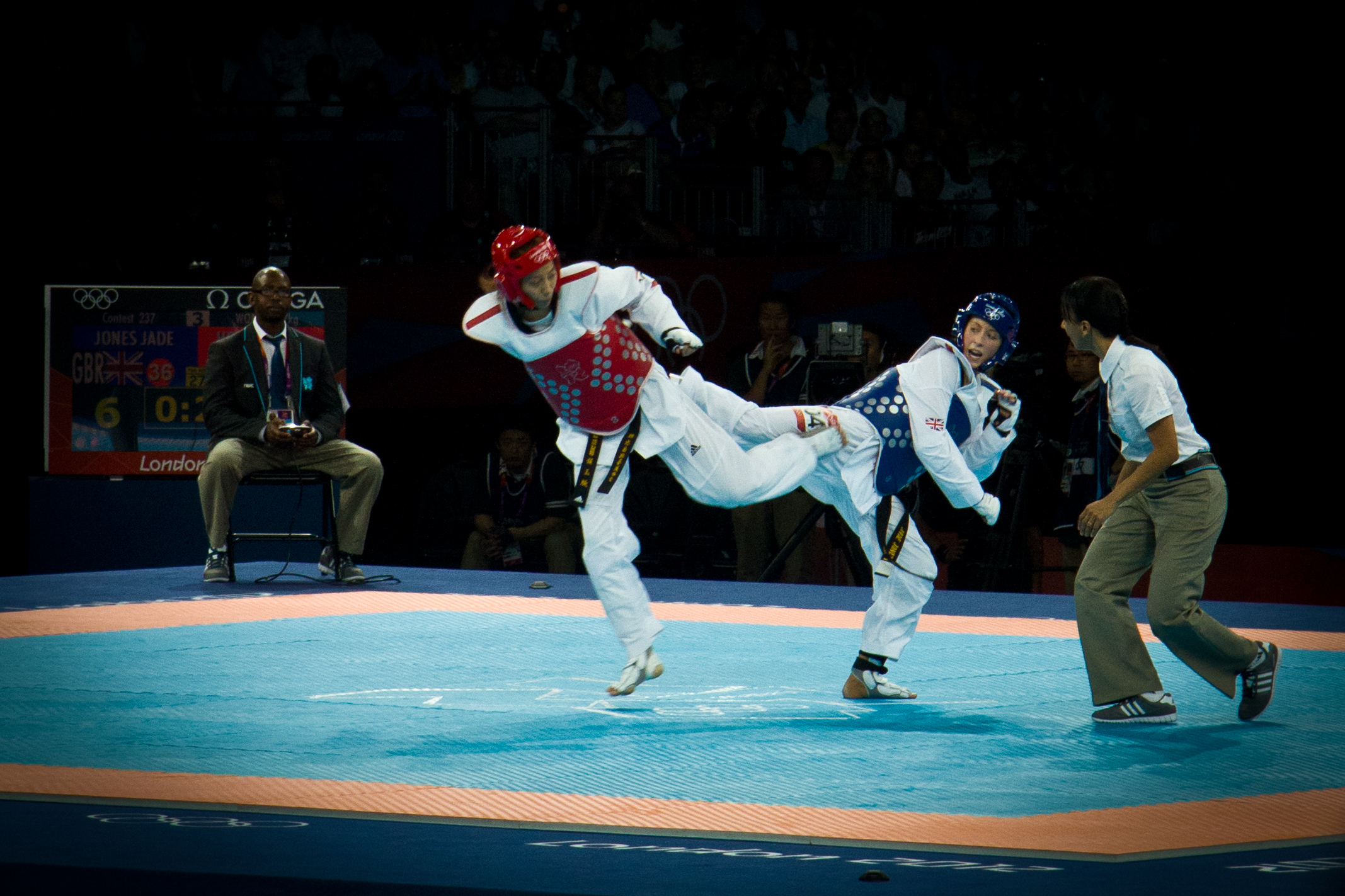
Gold medal winner, Jade Jones (in blue) at the 2012 London Olympics

=== Repechage ===
Every competitor who lost to one of the two finalists competed in the repechage, another single-elimination competition. Each semifinal loser faced the last remaining repechage competitor from the opposite half of the bracket in a bronze medal match.

Preliminary Round
Dragana Gladović (SRB)	2
Mayu Hamada (JPN)	15 (PTG)
Diana López (USA)	4
Suvi Mikkonen (FIN)	9

Bronze Medal Contest
Mayu Hamada (JPN)	8
Marlène Harnois (FRA)	12
Tseng Li-Cheng (TPE)	14 (PTG)
Suvi Mikkonen (FIN)	2
