= Philippe Paoli =

Lebanese footballer (born 1995)

Personal information
- Full name: Philippe Robert Paoli
- Date of birth: 3 January 1995 (age 31)
- Place of birth: Beirut, Lebanon
- Height: 1.90 m (6 ft 3 in)
- Position: Forward

Youth career
- 2006–2011: Athletico SC

Senior career*
Years	Team	Apps	(Gls)
2011–2012	Egtmaaey Tripoli		
2012–2013	Racing Beirut	9	(7)
2013–2014	Lyon B	0	(0)
2014–2015	1. FC Köln II	12	(0)
2015–2016	Lommel	14	(1)
2016	→ Oosterwijk (loan)	3	(0)
Total		38	(8)

International career
2011–2012	Lebanon U16		
2011–2015	Lebanon U19		
2015	Lebanon U23	4	(0)
2012–2013	Lebanon	4	(0)
- * Club domestic league appearances and goals

Philippe Robert Paoli (Arabic: فيليب روبير باولي; born 3 January 1995) is a Lebanese former professional footballer who played as a forward.

After playing one season with Racing Beirut, Paoli moved to Lyon B in 2013. He then moved to Germany the following year, where he played for 1. FC Köln II. In 2014 he moved to Belgium, playing for Lommel, before moving to Oosterwijk on loan in 2016, where he ended his professional career aged 22. Paoli also represented the Lebanese national team.

== Club career ==
Paoli is a graduate of the Dbayeh-based Athletico SC academy. He also practiced athletics, a discipline that saw him win several national titles in the youth categories. Having played for Racing Beirut in the Lebanese Premier League, Paoli joined the Olympique Lyon B team in summer 2013 on a two-year deal. He played for Köln II in 2014.

In summer 2015, Paoli moved to Belgian First Division B side Lommel United. He was sidelined for most of the season due to a fibula fracture. In 2016, Paoli joined Oosterwijk on a one-year loan. In 2017, Paoli was nominated among the 17 candidates for the Belgian Lion, an award given to the best player of Arab origin in the Belgian First Division A.

== International career ==
Aged 17, Paoli was called by coach Theo Bücker for the Lebanon national team for a friendly match against the Australia on 6 September 2012, in which he came on as a substitute in the 59th minute. He was the captain of the Lebanon national under-19 team during the 2016 AFC U-19 Championship qualifiers that took place in Oman in 2015.

== Style of play ==
Initially a winger in his youth, Paoli developed into a striker once he moved to Europe.

== Personal life ==
Paoli has dual Lebanese–Greek nationality. Paoli's sister, Andrea, participated in the 2012 Olympics as a Taekwondo practitioner; his father, Robert, was a basketball player.

In 2017, after retiring from professional football aged 22, Paoli studied at King's College London to pursue a degree in business and management.

== Honours ==
Individual

- Lebanese Premier League Best Young Player: 2012–13
