= Pen-ek Karaket =

Thai taekwondo practitioner

Medal record

Men's taekwondo

Representing Thailand

Asian Games
Silver medal – second place	2010 Guangzhou	58 kg

Asian Championships
Gold medal – first place	2010 Astana	58 kg
Silver medal – second place	2012 Ho Chi Minh City	58 kg

Southeast Asian Games
Bronze medal – third place	2009 Vientiane	58 kg
Bronze medal – third place	2011 Jakarta-Palembang	63 kg

Asian Martial Arts Games
Gold medal – first place	2009 Bangkok	58 kg

World Junior Championships
Gold medal – first place	2006 Ho Chi Minh City	51 kg

Pen-Ek Karaket (born 18 March 1990, Bangkok) is a Thai taekwondo practitioner who competed at the 2012 Summer Olympics in the under 58 kg weight class. Karaket lost to Lee Dae-Hoon in the first round. As Lee reached the gold medal match, Karaket was entered into the repechage. Karaket beat Tamer Bayoumi to reach the bronze medal match but lost that to Óscar Muñoz of Colombia.

Karaket is coached by Thailand's national taekwondo coach Choi Young-Seok. He also competed in the Asian Games 2010 where he earned silver for Thailand.

Karaket graduated from Bodin Decha School in 2007 and graduated from Kasetsart University.
