= Sockgate =

Taekwondo competition judgment

The contested judgment of taekwondo of 2010 Asian Games, also called "Sockgate", is a dispute at the 2010 Asian Games on November 17. Taiwanese taekwondo athlete Yang Shu-chun was disqualified with twelve seconds remaining in the first round due to "unauthorized" (disputed) sensors on her socks.

== The judgment ==
Yang was facing Vietnamese opponent Vu Thi Hau in the first round of the flyweight division (under 49 kilogram) of the Asian Games taekwondo competition in Guangzhou, Guangdong, China on November 17, 2010, when she was accused of using the "unauthorized" sensors. During the pre-match testing of equipment, the referee discovered that Yang had two extra sensors on the heels of each sock, which she was asked to remove. She fought without the two additional sensors on her socks.

However, with twelve seconds remaining in the first round of the bout, when Yang was leading at an advantage of 9–0, Asian Taekwondo Union vice-president Zhao Lei (赵磊) of China instructed Filipino referee Fernandez S. Estanislaoto to call Yang over to the side and inspected her heels. Finding nothing, the referee then called for the match referee to bring over the two sensors that had already been removed and kept under the chair that Yang's coach was sitting on. Following that, Zhao and the referee had a brief discussion, and the match referee disqualified Yang and awarded Vu a 12–0 victory.

== The controversy ==
Chinese Taipei representatives at the taekwondo venue immediately pointed out that the equipment was certified and that both fighters passed a pre-match inspection. Following the disqualification, Yang and her coach both protested on the mat for about an hour. The World Taekwondo Federation (WTF) authorities then gave the ultimatum for them to leave, or they would suspend every Chinese Taipei taekwondo member in the Game. The WTF Secretary-General Yang Jin-suk initially did not reveal the reason why Yang was disqualified and told the press that it was for the protection of the athlete's personal privacy, but later it was revealed the reason was for the sensors on her socks. Secretary-General later said, "It was clearly a manipulative move with the intent of cheating, and that's the reason why the individual was disqualified."

According to the Secretary-General of the WTF, there are two sorts of sensor socks for taekwondo. It is specified that only the newer type is allowed to be used in the 2010 Asian Games, because the older type of sensors are fixed by velcro, which allows athletes to easily add new sensors themselves. The sensors on the newer type are fixed by stitching and have no possibility to be altered by illegal methods, but the newer type have no sensors on the heel.

Yang's coach, Liu Tsung-da (劉聰達), said the inspector for the match asked Yang to change her socks due to poor signal response before the match. Yang put on another set of older velcro socks and passed the equipment inspection. During the match, the sensors on the heel area had already been removed, which should not affect the scoring record. Right after the judgment, Liu asked for the testimony of the inspector and the surveillance video as evidence, but the demands were all rejected.

The equipment supplier of the Chinese Taipei team said they had never received an official notification from the WTF about suspending the velcro type socks before the Asian Games. There were many of the older type being used in other matches of different weight classes, but those athletes didn't suffer any punishment before or after their matches. According to the WTF official instruction for taekwondo athletes, the former type is still legal in any international games until London Olympics in 2012. The two "unauthorized" extra sensors proclaimed to be found by the Game officials belong to the original design of the older type by a Korean equipment manufacturer, which is the only manufacturer authorized by the WTF officials for the 2010 Asian Games.

== Political reaction ==
Political reaction in the Republic of China (Taiwan) came swiftly, with politicians on both sides of the political spectrum rushing to Yang's defense. The Kuomintang legislator Huang Chih-hsiung (黃志雄), himself an Olympic taekwondo silver medalist at the 2004 Athens Olympic Games, stated "the decision was inconceivable and ridiculous." Premier Wu Den-yih (吳敦義) is cited as saying, "From the current information we have, our athlete Yang Shu-chun was wronged. If it is proven that the ruling was unfair, the Asian Games Organizing Committee has to shoulder the biggest responsibility." The Sports Affairs Council demanded an explanation from the Asian Taekwondo Union regarding the disqualification.

The Democratic Progressive Party (DPP) legislator Pan Men-an (潘孟安) claimed at a press conference that the accusation by the Game officials that Yang had cheated was an "insult to everybody around the country," and charged that, "the responsibility should fall on the people that conducted the equipment checks."

However, not all was completely peaceful between the two political sides, as the DPP leaders accused the government of a slow response. The DPP Legislator Chiu Yi-ying (邱議瑩) complained that: "A large number of officials attended the Games, but all they have done so far is to show up at and take part in the awarding ceremonies when our athletes win. When Yang was disqualified, what did they do? Nothing."

Tsai Ing-wen (蔡英文), then-current chairperson of the DPP and a candidate for mayor of New Taipei City in 2010, released a statement saying: "This government has always deferred to China and hasn't emphasized our attitudes enough, especially on sovereignty issues." She further stated, "As a result, we think that it is regrettable that frontline officials haven't been protesting strongly enough about this incident."

== Public reaction ==
Shortly after the disqualification, Taiwanese netizens voiced their dissatisfaction with the judgment. Soon, several Facebook groups in support of Yang were posted, some with hundreds of thousands of followers. On the pages, outcry toward both South Korea and China was rampant, with many conjecturing a conspiracy, as Yang was regarded as the primary rival to China's gold medal favorite, Wu Jingyu (吴静钰), the eventual winner of the gold. The conspiracy theorized that Zhao Le (赵磊), Wu Jingyu's long-time mentor, was the invisible hand that deliberately forced Yang's ouster to pave the way for Wu's gold medal.

The 2006 Asian Games gold medalist Su Li-wen (蘇麗文) came out in support of Yang in her blog, saying that she has never heard of such a ridiculous accusation and pointed out that eight of Yang's nine points were manually scored without the benefit of the foot sensors.

Yang's father, Yang Chin-hsing (楊進興), remarked, "The whole thing is utterly unacceptable", and told the press that Yang had spent ten months preparing for this competition and that he suspected that China was behind this incident.

The Asian Taekwondo Union published a misleading article titled "Shocking Act of Deception by Chinese Taipei" on its website, attempting to deflect South Korea of blame of the incident. The homepage of the website was then hacked by Taiwanese hackers who added hostile criticism. Later, the homepage was restored, and the misleading article was removed. The Union has reportedly blocked Taiwanese IPs from accessing its website.

=== Anti-Korean protests in Taiwan ===
Since this is not the first time that Taiwanese athletes have faced controversial judgments in international games, netizens rallied to boycott Korean merchandise. A legislator candidate even led the congregation to protest and burn the flag of South Korea. One Taipei citizen threw eggs at a Korean immigration school as a protest. A few restaurants and taxi drivers announced, "No Service to Koreans."

== Verdict ==
On December 21, 2010, Yang was given a three months' suspension for protesting her disqualification during the 2010 Asian Games by the World Taekwondo Federation (WTF). Her coach, Liu Tsung-ta was given a 20 months' suspension while Chinese Taipei Taekwondo Association (CTTA) was fined US$50,000 for "negligence and wrongdoing".

== See also ==
- Taekwondo at the 2010 Asian Games
- Chinese Taipei at the 2010 Asian Games
- Olympic Council of Asia (OCA)
- Roy Jones Jr 1988 olympic ruling controversy
