= Suvi Mikkonen =

Finnish taekwondo practitioner

Suvi Mikkonen (born 11 July 1988, in Saari) is a Finnish taekwondo practitioner. Mikkonen is a Finnish national champion, three times the Nordic champion (2008, 2010, 2011), and won the European University Championship in 2009. She has competed in the 2009 and 2011 World Championships and the 2008 European Championships. Currently, she is a member of the Finnish National Team and, when in Finland, trains in Helsinki. She lives permanently in Madrid and trains with her coach and partner, Jesus Ramal, the head Olympic coach for the Finnish National Team.

Mikkonen started Taekwondo training at a gym opened by Chuck Norris at the age of four in Florida, where she moved with her family. Mikkonen moved to Madrid as a teenager and is studying Sport Sciences at the University of Madrid. She is fluent in Finnish, Spanish, and English.

At the 2012 Summer Olympics, she competed in the under 57 kg defeating the Senegalese Bineta Diedhiou in the first round, but was defeated by eventual silver medalist Hou Yuzhuo of China in the quarterfinals. After being defeated by Hou Yuzhuo, she entered the Repechage and defeated Diana Lopez of the US. Eventually, she got 5th place due to being defeated by Tseng Li-cheng of Chinese Taipei in the bronze medal matches.

She qualified for the 2016 Olympics. In Rio, she beat Julia Vasconcelos Dos Santos before losing to Nikita Glasnovic.
