= Jung Jin-hee =

South Korean taekwondo practitioner

Personal information
- Nationality: South Korean
- Born: 10 April 1985 (age 41)

Sport
- Sport: Taekwondo
Medal record
Representing South Korea
Women's taekwondo
World Championships
Gold medal – first place	2007 Beijing	Bantamweight
Asian Championships
Bronze medal – third place	2010 Astana	Featherweight

Jung Jin-hee (born 10 April 1985) is a South Korean taekwondo practitioner.

She won a gold medal in bantamweight at the 2007 World Taekwondo Championships in Beijing. She won a bronze medal at the 2010 Asian Taekwondo Championships.
