= Japoy Lizardo =

Filipino taekwondo practitioner

Personal information
- Nationality: Filipino
- Born: John Paul Lizardo; June 8, 1986 (age 40)
- Years active: 1997–2015

Sport
- Country: Philippines
- Sport: Taekwondo
Medal record
Representing Philippines
Men's taekwondo
Asian Games
Bronze medal – third place	2010 Guangzhou	Finweight
Asian Championships
Silver medal – second place	2012 Ho Chi Minh City	Finweight
Silver medal – second place	2010 Astana	Finweight
Silver medal – second place	2006 Bangkok	Finweight
Bronze medal – third place	2008 Henan	Finweight
Southeast Asian Games
Gold medal – first place	2011 Indonesia	Flyweight
Gold medal – first place	2005 Manila	Finweight
Silver medal – second place	2009 Vientiane	Finweight

John Paul Gaerlan Lizardo (born June 8, 1986), also known as Japoy Lizardo, is a Filipino former taekwondo Player for the Philippine National Team, practitioner, actor and commercial model.

== Education ==
Lizardo attended Pasig Catholic College and studied college at De La Salle University - College of Saint Benilde.

== Career ==
At 11 years old, Lizardo took up taekwondo, the year later he earned his black belt. He joined the Philippine Black Belt contingent, the national team for students pursuing their elementary and high school studies, at age 12. When he was two years older, he joined the Philippine junior national team and began to compete in international tournaments such as the Korean Open and the Asian Junior Championship. By age 18, Lizardo was a member of the senior national team.

Lizardo first garnered attention at the 2001 Asian Junior Taekwondo Championships where he captured the silver medal in the men's finweight.

He has won three medals (two silvers one bronze) at the senior stage of the Asian Taekwondo Championships and competed in the World Taekwondo Championships in 2007 and 2009.

He ended his competitive career when he quit as a member of the Philippine men's taekwondo team in November 2015 due to his leg injury.

Lizardo was among the 14 scholar-athletes who have scholarships from the Olympic Solidarity Movement under the Philippine Olympic Committee.

As of 2016, Lizardo serves as the head coach of the Philippine National Taekwondo Team.

== Personal life ==
He grew up in Cabanatuan City and was honored in 2012 with the "Anak ng Cabanatuan" award during the city's 62nd founding anniversary, which recognized distinguished individuals with strong ties to the city.

He is married with co-taekwondo artist Janice Lagman since May 8, 2016. On August 11, 2016, the couple announced on Instagram that they are expecting their first child. They announced the birth of their first child on February 25, 2017.
