= Sousan Hajipour =

Iranian taekwondo practitioner

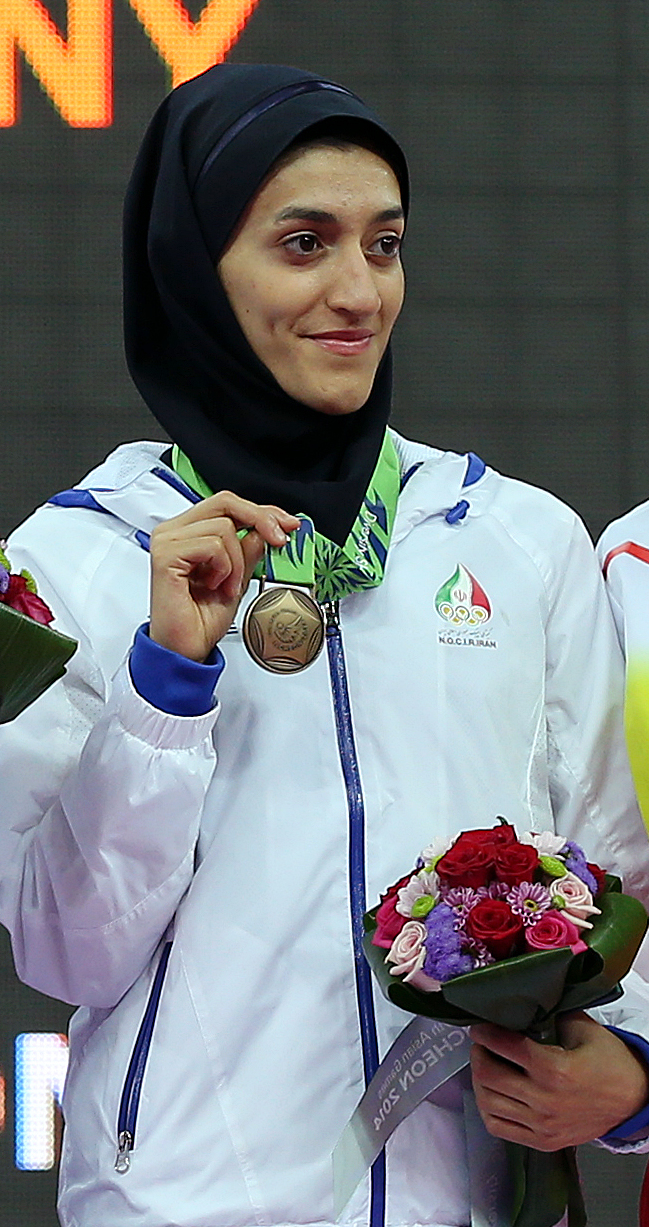

Medal record

Women's taekwondo

Representing Iran

Asian Games
Bronze medal – third place	2010 Guangzhou	57 kg
Bronze medal – third place	2014 Incheon	57 kg

Asian Championships
Bronze medal – third place	2010 Astana	57 kg
Bronze medal – third place	2014 Tashkent	57 kg

Islamic Solidarity Games
Gold medal – first place	2013 Palembang	57 kg

Sousan Hajipour Goli (Persian: سوسن حاجی‌پور گلی‌, born 28 September 1990 in Babol) is an Iranian taekwondo practitioner. She competed in the 67 kg event at the 2012 Summer Olympics and was eliminated by Carmen Marton in the preliminary round.
