= Arman Chilmanov =

Kazakhstani taekwondo practitioner

Medal record

Men's taekwondo

Representing Kazakhstan

Olympic Games
Bronze medal – third place	2008 Beijing	+80 kg

World Championships
Bronze medal – third place	2007 Beijing	Middleweight
Bronze medal – third place	2009 Copenhagen	Heavyweight

Asian Games
Bronze medal – third place	2002 Busan	Middleweight
Bronze medal – third place	2006 Doha	Middleweight
Bronze medal – third place	2010 Guangzhou	Heavyweight

Asian Championships
Gold medal – first place	2006 Bangkok	Middleweight
Silver medal – second place	2010 Astana	Heavyweight
Bronze medal – third place	2008 Zhengzhou	Heavyweight

Arman Chilmanov (Kazakh: Арман Шилманов; born 20 April 1984) is a Kazakhstani taekwondo athlete.

== 2008 Olympics ==
Chilmanov was the other competitor in the controversial +80 kg bronze medal match against Ángel Matos of Cuba.

He was behind 3–2 in the second round when his opponent sustained an injury to his toe. Matos took a Kyeshi - one minute of injury recovery time - but Chilmanov was declared the winner of the bout when the Cuban's timeout expired. After a brief argument, Matos kicked referee Chakir Chelbat in the face, punched a judge in the arm and spat on the floor of the arena before being escorted out by security, and was subsequently banned for life, along with his coach Leudin González. After the chaos, he commented "To me it was obvious he (Matos) couldn't continue, the toe on his left foot was broken. Rules are rules, I'm happy with my medal".
