= Yang Shu-chun =

Taiwanese taekwondo practitioner

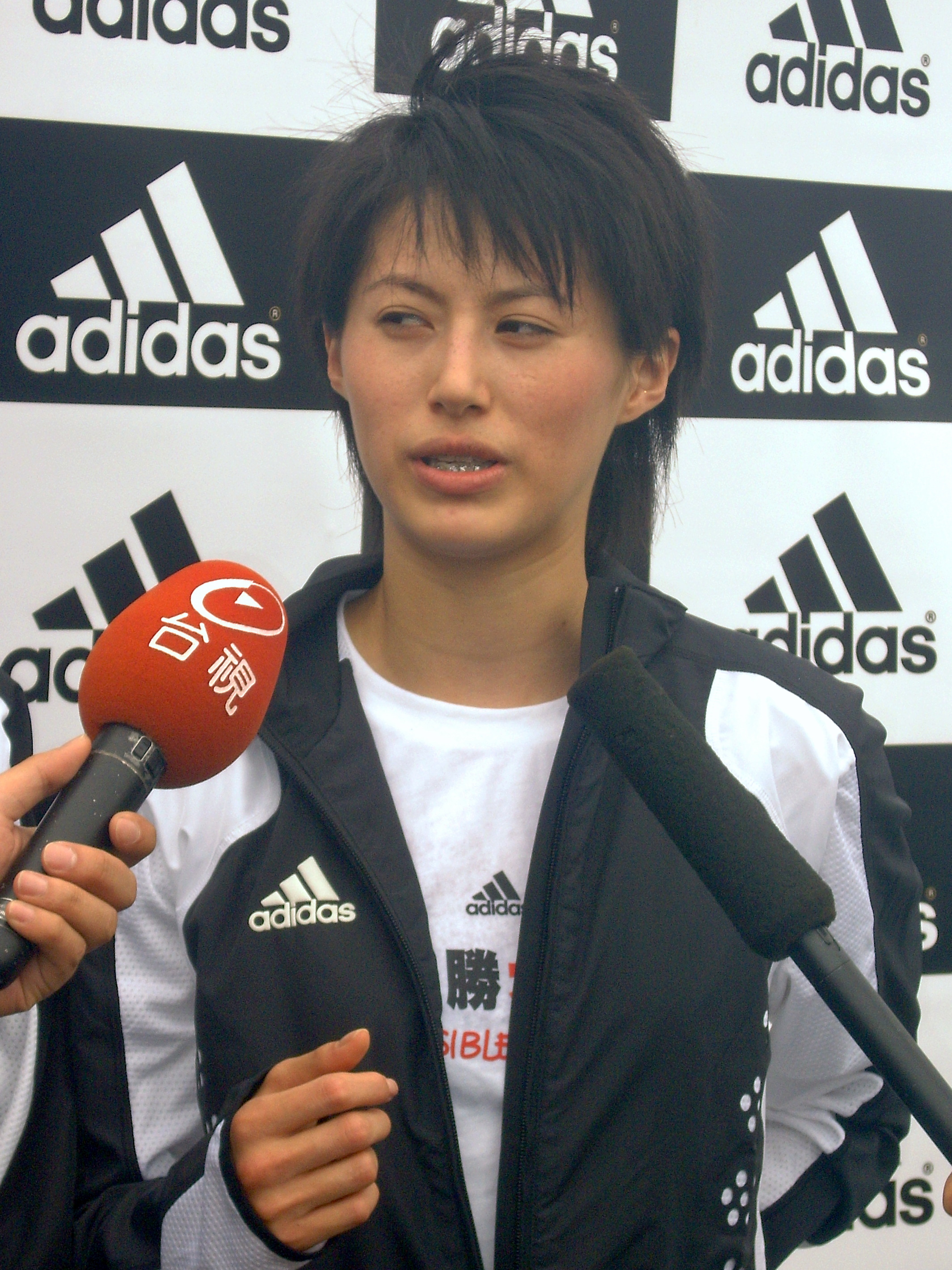
- Yang Shu-chun (2008)

Personal information
- Born: October 26, 1985 (age 40) Yingge, Taipei County, now New Taipei City
Medal record
Women's taekwondo
Representing Chinese Taipei
World Championships
Silver medal – second place	2011 Gyeongju	Flyweight
Bronze medal – third place	2007 Beijing	Finweight
Asian Games
Silver medal – second place	2006 Doha	Finweight
Asian Championships
Gold medal – first place	2008 Henan	Flyweight
Gold medal – first place	2012 Ho Chi Minh City	Flyweight
Bronze medal – third place	2010 Astana	Flyweight
Universiade
Silver medal – second place	2005 Izmir	Finweight
Silver medal – second place	2009 Belgrade	Flyweight

Yang Shu-chun or Judy Yang (Chinese: 楊淑君; pinyin: Yáng Shújūn; born October 26, 1985, in Yingge, Taipei County, now New Taipei City) is a female Taiwanese taekwondo athlete. She won the women's flyweight (under 51 kg) gold medal at the 2008 Asian Taekwondo Championships. In July 2011, Yang withdrew the appeal over her disqualification. In the 2012 London Olympics, Yang lost to Chanatip Sonkham of Thailand in the quarterfinals.

After her suspension, in May 2011, Yang competed at the 2011 World Taekwondo Championships held in Gyeongju, South Korea, and won a silver medal in the –49 kg category losing to China's Wu Jingyu 6–2 in the final.

== At the 2010 Asian Games ==
At the 2010 Asian Games in Guangzhou, China on November 17, she was controversially disqualified near the end of the first round when she was leading 9-0 against her Vietnamese opponent Vu Thi Hau. "Unauthorized" electronic sensors were allegedly found in her socks before or during the match. Yang's equipment had passed the pre-match inspection. After the disqualification, Yang protested the judgement in tears and refused to leave the mat. Yang's disqualification drew a furious response from media and fans in Taiwan. In December 2010, Yang was banned by the World Taekwondo Federation (WTF) from participating any international Taekwondo competitions for three months, her coach Liu Tsung-ta was suspended for 20 months and the Chinese Taipei Taekwondo Federation was fined $50,000. The Sports Affairs Council of Taiwan filed an appeal with the Court of Arbitration for Sports based in Lausanne.

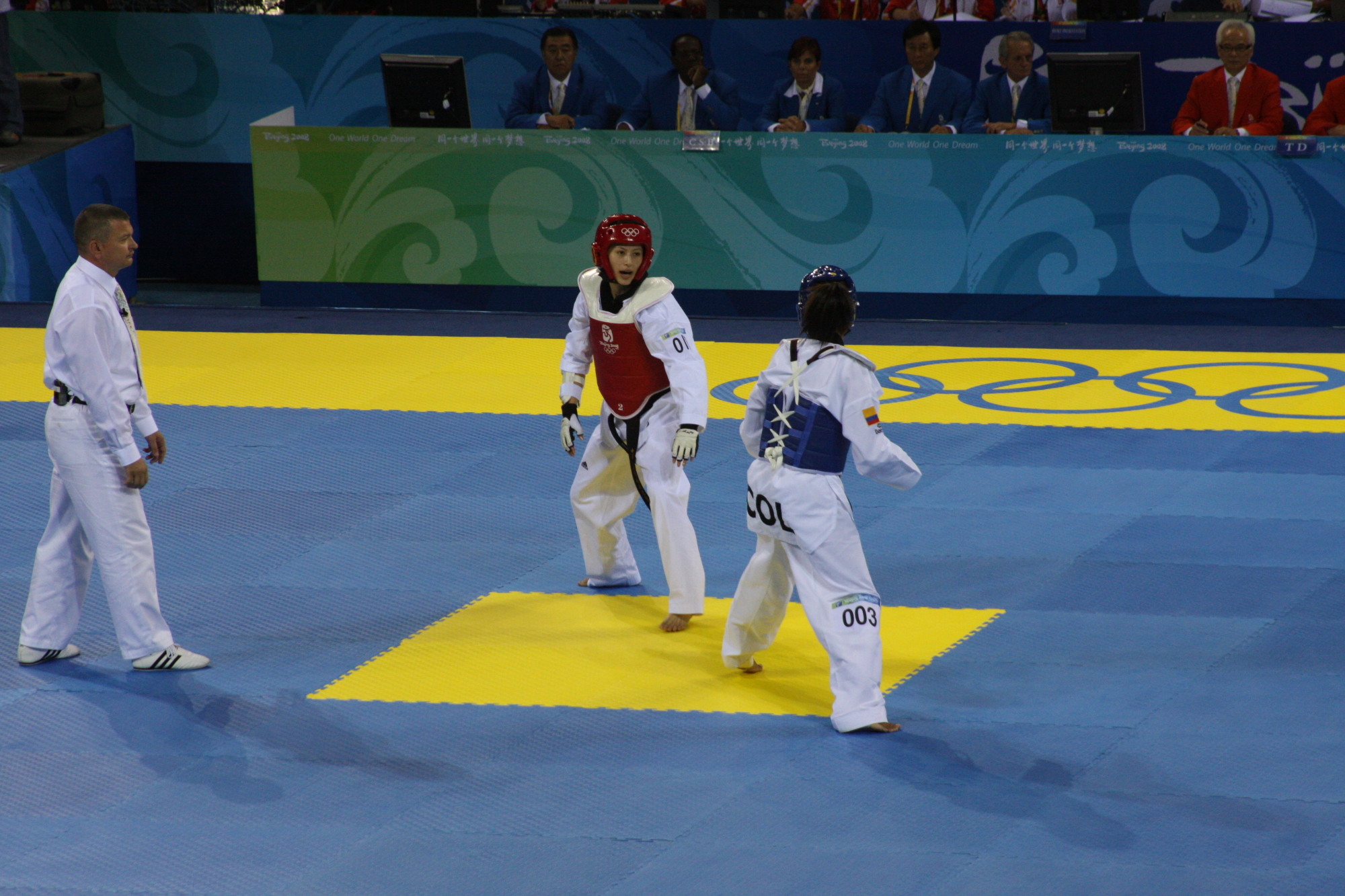
2008 Summer Olympics Taekwondo - Gladys Mora (COL, blue) v. Yang Shu-Chun (TPE, red)

=== Taiwanese extreme anti-Korean movement ===
After Yang's ruling, some Taiwanese people even started a boycott of Korean products because they think South Korea controlled all the major positions in the world taekwondo body that oversees the sport. Some Taiwanese even carried out extreme anti-Korean movements such as burning the South Korean flags and throwing eggs at a Korean school in Taipei. In response, the Ministry of Foreign Affairs of South Korea said, "The disqualification of Yang Shu-chun at the Games is regrettable, but there is a need to pay attention to the burning of South Korean flags and boycotting of products that are spreading across the island."
