= Hou Yuzhuo =

Chinese taekwondo practitioner

Medal record

Women's taekwondo

Representing China

Olympic Games
Silver medal – second place	2012 London	57 kg

World Championships
Gold medal – first place	2009 Copenhagen	Featherweight
Gold medal – first place	2011 Gyeongju	Featherweight

Asian Games
Silver medal – second place	2010 Guangzhou	Featherweight

Asian Championships
Silver medal – second place	2010 Astana	Featherweight

Universiade
Silver medal – second place	2011 Shenzhen	Featherweight

Hou Yuzhuo (Chinese: 侯玉琢; pinyin: Hóu Yùzhuó; born 14 November 1987 in Zhangjiakou, Hebei) is a female Chinese Taekwondo practitioner. She won gold medal in 2009 Copenhagen World Taekwondo Championship and the silver at the 2012 Summer Olympics.

At the 2012 Summer Olympics in London she defeated American Beijing bronze medalist Diana López in the final seconds in the first round, before beating Suvi Mikkonen in the second round and Marlène Harnois in the semi-final. She lost 6-4 to Jade Jones in the final.

== See also ==
- China at the 2012 Summer Olympics § Taekwondo
- Taekwondo at the 2012 Summer Olympics – Women's 57 kg
