= Andrea Paoli =

Lebanese taekwondo practitioner

Personal information
- Born: 2 May 1992 (age 34) Beirut, Lebanon
- Height: 1.70 m (5 ft 7 in)
- Weight: 57 kg (126 lb)

Sport
- Country: Lebanon
- Sport: Taekwondo
- Event: 57kg
- Club: Mont La Salle
- Coached by: Bassem Aad
Medal record
Women's taekwondo
Asian Games
Bronze medal – third place	2010 Guangzhou	Featherweight
Mediterranean Games
Bronze medal – third place	2013 Mersin	57 kg
- Updated on 26 July 2013

Andrea Robert Paoli (Arabic: أندريا روبير باولي) is a Lebanese athlete who was the Taekwondo champion of Lebanon in the senior category for five consecutive seasons.

== Biography ==
In 2007, she won the Lebanese Juniors championship and later in the year, she earned the bronze medal at the Asian Juniors championship. This medal led to her being selected to take part in the Youth Olympic Camp that took place during the Beijing Olympic Games. She won a bronze medal at the 2010 Asian Games and in 2011, she was ranked eighth in the world. Paoli was able to qualify to the London Olympics by ranking second the Asian Olympic Qualifiers that took place in Thailand in 2011.

She represented Lebanon in Taekwondo at the 2012 Summer Olympics held in London. She was given the honor of carrying the flag for Lebanon during the Parade of Nations. During the Women's 57 kg event, she advanced from the preliminary round to the quarterfinals by defeating Nidia Munoz of Cuba. In the quarterfinals, she lost against Tseng Li-Cheng of Chinese Taipei.

== Family ==
Her brother, Philippe, is a former professional footballer. Her father, Robert, was a basketball player.
