= Yaser Bamatraf =

Yemeni taekwondo practitioner (born 1993)

Medal record

Men's taekwondo

Representing Yemen

Asian Championships
Silver medal – second place	2012 Ho Chi Minh City	Bantamweight

Yaser Bamatraf (born April 1, 1993) is a Yemeni Taekwondo practitioner. He won the silver medal in the men's bantamweight (under 63 kg) category at the 2012 Asian Taekwondo Championships.
