= Lebanon at the 2010 Asian Games =

- IOC code: LIB
- NOC: Lebanese Olympic Committee

in Guangzhou
- Competitors: 53 in 15 sports
- Officials: 25
- Medals Ranked 29th: Gold 0 Silver 1 Bronze 2 Total 3

Asian Games appearances (overview)
- 1978; 1982; 1986; 1990; 1994; 1998; 2002; 2006; 2010; 2014; 2018; 2022; 2026

Lebanon participated at the 16th Asian Games in Guangzhou, China. It won 1 silver and 2 bronze medals.

== Medalists ==
Medal	Name	Sport	Event	Date
Silver	Abdo Al-Yazgie; Joseph Hanna; Joe Salem	Shooting	Men's Trap Team	19 November
Bronze	Andrea Paoli	Taekwondo	Women's Under 57kg	18 November
Bronze	Joe Salem	Shooting	Men's Trap	19 November
