= Lê Huỳnh Châu =

Vietnamese Taekwondo practitioner

Le Huynh Chau
Personal information
- Full name: Lê Huỳnh Châu
- Nationality: Vietnamese
- Born: Châu; 13 November 1987 (age 38) Ho Chi Minh City, Vietnam
- Weight: 58 kg (128 lb) (2012)

Sport
- Country: Vietnam
- Sport: Taekwondo
- College team: Hochiminh City University of Physical Education and Sports
- Turned pro: 2007

Achievements and titles
- Olympic finals: 2012 London
- World finals: 2011 Gyeongju
- Regional finals: 2012 Hochiminh City
Medal record
Men's taekwondo
Representing Vietnam
World Championships
Bronze medal – third place	2011 Gyeongju	Bantamweight
Asian Championships
Bronze medal – third place	2010 Astana	Flyweight
Bronze medal – third place	2012 Ho Chi Minh City	Flyweight
Southeast Asian Games
Gold medal – first place	2013 Naypyidaw	Featherweight
Silver medal – second place	2009 Vientiane	Featherweight
Bronze medal – third place	2007 Nakhon Ratchasima	Flyweight

Le Huynh Chau (Vietnamese: Lê Huỳnh Châu; born 13 November 1987; living in Ho Chi Minh City) is a male Vietnamese Taekwondo practitioner who competed at the 2012 Summer Olympics in the -58 kg class. He is one of the greatest medalists of Vietnam's Taekwondo.
