= Tseng Li-cheng =

Taiwanese taekwondo practitioner

Personal information
- Nationality: Republic of China
- Born: Tseng Pei-hua; 26 December 1986 (age 39) Guanshan, Taitung County, Taiwan
- Height: 1.69 m (5 ft 7 in) (2012)
- Weight: 57 kg (126 lb) (2012)

Sport
- Country: Chinese Taipei
- Sport: Taekwondo
- Event: 57 kg

Achievements and titles
- Olympic finals: Bronze
Medal record
Women's taekwondo
Representing Chinese Taipei
Olympic Games
Bronze medal – third place	2012 London	57 kg
Asian Games
Silver medal – second place	2002 Busan	Featherweight
Bronze medal – third place	2006 Doha	Featherweight
Asian Championships
Gold medal – first place	2002 Amman	Featherweight
Gold medal – first place	2006 Bangkok	Featherweight
Gold medal – first place	2010 Astana	Featherweight
Gold medal – first place	2012 Ho Chi Minh City	Featherweight
Silver medal – second place	2008 Luoyang	Lightweight
East Asian Games
Gold medal – first place	2009 Hong Kong	Featherweight
Silver medal – second place	2005 Macau	Featherweight

Tseng Li-cheng (Chinese: 曾櫟騁; pinyin: Zēng Lìchěng; old name: Tseng Pei-hua, Chinese: 曾珮華; born 26 December 1986) is a Taiwanese taekwondo practitioner of aboriginal origin (tribe: Amis). At the 2012 Summer Olympics, she won the bronze medal in the Taekwondo Women's 57 kg.
