= 2010 Asian Games =

Multi-sport event in Guangzhou, China

XVI Asian Games
- Host city: Guangzhou, China
- Motto: Thrilling Games, Harmonious Asia (Chinese: 激情盛会，和谐亚洲; pinyin: Jīqíng shènghuì, héxié yǎzhōu)
- Nations: 45
- Athletes: 9,704
- Events: 476 in 42 sports (57 disciplines)
- Opening: November 12, 2010
- Closing: November 27, 2010
- Opened by: Wen Jiabao; Premier of China
- Closed by: Ahmad Al-Fahad Al-Sabah; President of the Olympic Council of Asia
- Athlete's Oath: Fu Haifeng
- Judge's Oath: Yan Ninan
- Torch lighter: He Chong
- Ceremony venue: Haixinsha Island
- Website: gz2010.cn (archived)

Summer

Winter

The 2010 Asian Games (2010年亚洲运动会), officially known as the XVI Asian Games (第十六届亚洲运动会) and also known as Guangzhou 2010 (广州2010), were a regional multi-sport event held from November 12 to 27, 2010 in Guangzhou, Guangdong, China (although several events commenced earlier on November 7, 2010). It was the second time China hosted the Asian Games, with the first one being Asian Games 1990 in Beijing.

Guangzhou's three neighboring cities, Dongguan, Foshan and Shanwei co-hosted the Games. Premier Wen Jiabao opened the Games along the Pearl River in Haixinsha Island. A total of 53 venues were used to host the events. The design concept of the official logo of the 2010 Asian Games was based on the legend of the Guangzhou's Five Goats, representing the Five Goats as the Asian Games Torch.

A total of 9,704 athletes from 45 National Olympic Committees (NOCs) competed in 476 events of 42 sports and disciplines (28 Olympic sports and 14 non-Olympic sports), making it the largest event in the history of the Games. Due to reductions in the number of sports for competition in the 2014 Asian Games, these Games marked the final time that six non-Olympic events would be held during the Asian Games.

China led the final medal tally, followed by South Korea in second place, and Japan in third place. China set a new Games record with 199 gold medals. China became the first nation in the history of Asian Games to cross the 400 medal-mark in one edition. Three world and 103 Asian records were broken. Macau and Bangladesh won their first ever Asian Games gold medals. In addition, the badminton men's singles gold medalist Lin Dan was voted as the most valuable player (MVP). The President of the Olympic Council of Asia Sheikh Ahmed Al-Fahad Al-Ahmed Al-Sabah hailed the Games as "outstanding" and "one of the best ever."

== Bidding process ==
Seoul and Amman dropped out before their bids were officially selected by the Olympic Council of Asia (OCA), leaving only two candidate cities—Guangzhou and Kuala Lumpur—by March 31, 2004. Seoul withdrew after considering that South Korea hosted the 2002 Games in Busan only eight years earlier. The evaluation committee of the OCA inspected Kuala Lumpur from April 12 to 14 and Guangzhou from April 14 to 16, 2004. On April 15, 2004, the Government of Malaysia declared that it would not support the Olympic Council of Malaysia with a Kuala Lumpur bid due to the high cost of hosting the Games, estimated at US$366 million, forcing Kuala Lumpur to withdraw its bid and leaving Guangzhou as the sole bidder. The OCA unanimously selected Guangzhou to host the 2010 Games during their 23rd General Assembly session in Doha, Qatar, site of the 2006 Asian Games, on July 1, 2004.

2010 Asian Games bidding results
| City | NOC | Votes |
| Guangzhou | China | Unanimous |

== Development and preparations ==
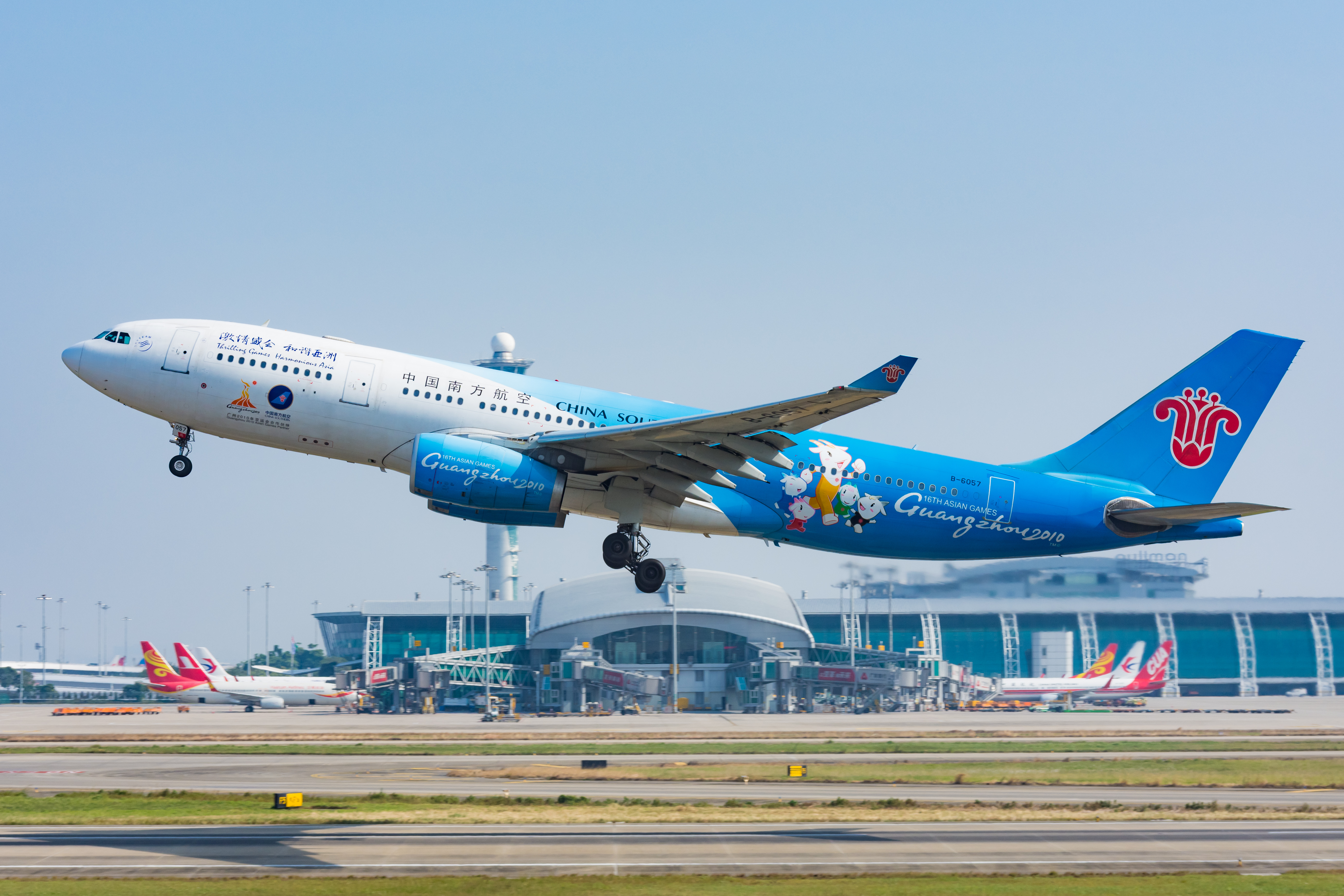
A China Southern Airlines' Airbus A330-200 (B-6057) wearing the Guangzhou 2010 Asian Games special livery taking off from Baiyun Airport to Chengdu in 2017.

=== Costs ===
On March 11, 2005, Lin Shusen, then party secretary of the Guangzhou Municipal Committee of the Chinese Communist Party (CCP) said the Games "will not cost more than ¥2 billion", in stark contrast to an earlier report, which had claimed that the cost could exceed ¥200 billion.

In March 2009, the director of the marketing department of the Games, Fang Da'er, claimed that the Games were short of funds, due to the lack of sponsorship and the 2008 financial crisis. An informal estimate put the Games' expenditure at about US$420 million and revenue at US$450 million.

On October 13, 2010, Wan Qingliang, mayor of Guangzhou at the time, officially revealed in a press conference that the total cost of staging the Asian Games and Asian Para Games was about ¥122.6 billion ($18.37 billion), with ¥109 billion spent on the city's infrastructure, ¥6.3 billion on the venues and some ¥7.3 billion spent on the Games' operations.

The full spending details would be released before 2013, according to the city's finance chief Zhang Jieming. It was later reported that Guangzhou accumulated US$32 billion (¥210 billion) in debt after staging the Games.

=== Volunteers ===
The volunteer recruitment program for the 2010 Asian Games began at 9 pm on April 21, 2009, with a target of 60,000 games-time volunteers. The volunteers were given a green short-sleeve t-shirt, a green long-sleeve t-shirt, a sport jacket, a pair of trousers, a hat, a water bottle, a pair of sport shoes and a waist bag.

=== Torch relay ===
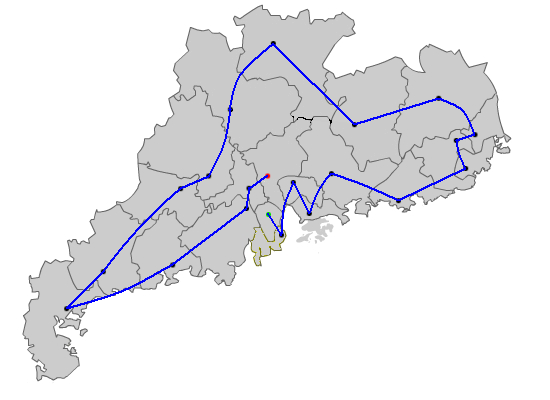
Torch relay route

Two torch designs were shortlisted in September 2009 for the 2010 Asian Games. The organizers chose a design named "The Tide" over one named "Exploit" as the torch of the Games. "The Tide" weighed 98 g and was 70 cm long. It was tall and straight in shape, while dynamic in terms of image.

The torch relay route was unveiled on March 4, 2010, and due to budgetary issues and the problems related to 2008 Summer Olympics torch relay, the organizers decided to carry it out on a smaller scale than those carried out previously. The torch was lit at the Great Wall of China on October 9, 2010, and traveled around the Temple of Heaven in Beijing. As originally scheduled, 21 cities were present on the relay route, with 2,010 torchbearers expected to carry it from October 12 to November 12, 2010. Two more cities — Changchun in Jilin and Haiyang in Shandong, the host cities of 2007 Asian Winter Games and 2012 Asian Beach Games respectively, were also later added to the route for a single day on October 15, 2010, increasing the number of torchbearers to 2,068 people.

=== Marketing ===
==== Emblem ====
Official mascot of 2010 Asian Games. From left to right: A Xiang, A Ru, Le Yangyang, A Yi and A He.

The official emblem of the Games was unveiled at Sun Yat-sen Memorial Hall on November 26, 2006, to prepare the city to succeed Doha 2006 as Asian Games host city. It was a stylized representation of Guangzhou's "Statue of the Five Goats" (Chinese: 五羊雕像; pinyin: Wǔ yáng diāoxiàng; Jyutping: ng5 joeng4 diu1 zoeng6) fused with a running track. In Chinese tradition, the goat is a blessing and brings people luck, and the host city Guangzhou is known as the "City of Goats". The orange and yellow emblem also resembles a flame.

==== Mascots ====
The mascots of the Games were five goat rams. They were unveiled on April 28, 2008, at the Guangzhou Baiyun International Convention and Exhibition Center. The five goat rams, four small and one large, were named A Xiang (阿祥), A He (阿和), A Ru (阿如), A Yi (阿意) and Le Yangyang (乐羊羊). The Chinese character "yang" (羊), "ram" or "goat" is an auspicious symbol and Guangzhou is known as "City of Rams". When read together, the Chinese names of the five rams are a message of blessing, literally meaning "Peace, Harmony and Great Happiness, with everything going as you wish." (Chinese: 祥和如意乐洋洋; pinyin: Xiánghé rúyì lè yángyáng) This represents the hopes that the Games will bring peace, auspiciousness, and happiness to the people of Asia.

A Xiang is characterized as a "handsome, stylish, sincere and brave" goat. A Xiang wears a blue outfit that resembles the blue ring of the Olympic emblem. The designers stated that this design symbolizes the ever-running Pearl River and the gentle and kind character and broad and welcoming heart of the people of Guangzhou.

A He is described as an earthy, modest, serene and decisive goat. A He wears a black outfit that resembles the black ring of the Olympic emblem and symbolizes the grand heritage and long history of the Lingnan culture.

A Ru is described as a beautiful, fashionable, smart and passionate goat. A Ru wears a red outfit that resembles the red ring of the Olympic emblem and symbolizes the red kapok (Bombax ceiba)—the city flower of Guangzhou, which gives Guangzhou its nickname of The City of Flowers.

A Yi is described as a nifty, cute, lively and outgoing goat. A Yi wears a green outfit that resembles the green ring of the Olympic emblem and symbolizes the city's famous Baiyun Mountain.

Le Yangyang is described as the tall, sunny and confident leader of the goat ram mascot team. Le Yangyang wears a yellow outfit that resembles the yellow ring of the Olympic emblem and symbolizes the color of rice grains, as Guangzhou has the nickname, The City of Rice Grains.

==== Medals ====
The medal designs were unveiled at Guangzhou No. 2 Children's Palace on September 29, 2010. The theme of the design was the "Maritime Silk Road." They featured the Emblem of the Olympic Council of Asia and Guangzhou's kapok flower on the obverse and the Maritime Silk Road image and the games' logo on the reverse. The Maritime Silk Road image depicts a Chinese boat sailing on the sea, representing Guangzhou as the starting place of Maritime Silk Road, as the most important commercial center and entrepot of the Southern China, Hong Kong and Macau regions.

==== Motto ====
The official motto of the 2010 Asian Games was "Thrilling Games, Harmonious Asia" (Chinese: 激情盛会, 和谐亚洲; pinyin: Jīqíng shènghuì, héxié yàzhōu). It was chosen to represent the goal of the Asian Games which is based on Olympic ideals and values. The Games aimed to create a competitive atmosphere for participating athletes while promoting unity, peace and friendship among Asian people regardless of differences in race, nationality, religious beliefs and language.

==== Promotion ====
Two years before the games, the "Road of Asia" tour was launched at Tianhe Sports Center to promote the games throughout the region. A ceremony was held on November 12, 2009, at the Guangzhou Gymnasium to mark the one-year milestone before the Games.

==== Merchandising ====
Organizers started selling licensed Asian Games products with introduction of first batch in January 2008. On May 7, 2009, the Southern Metropolis Daily newspaper signed a contract with the Guangzhou Asian Games Organizing Committee (GAGOC) and became the exclusive online retailer of licensed products.

==== Music ====
The official theme song was released on September 30, 2010, and was called "Reunion" (Chinese: 重逢; pinyin: chóng féng). It was composed by Wu Liqun, with lyrics written by Xu Rongkai. The English version was translated by Chen Ning Yang, a Chinese-American physicist, and his wife, Weng Fan. The song was performed by Sun Nan and the late Yao Beina. Sun Nan also performed it again with Mao Amin for a music video. The song was selected based from a solicitation campaign for Asian Games songs which received more than 1,600 entries. 36 of them were released as selected songs for the Games.

=== Venues ===
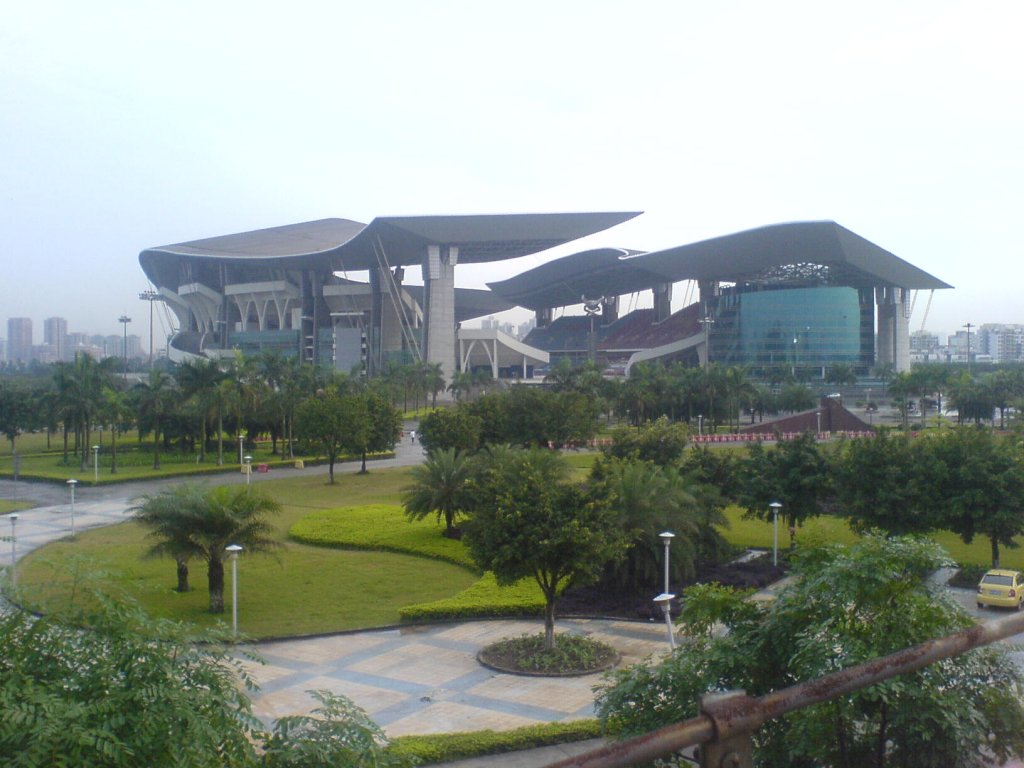
Guangdong Olympic Stadium used for all the athletics events

A total of 53 competition venues and 17 training venues were used for the Games, with four venues located outside of Guangzhou. Events took place at 42 pre-existing venues; eleven competition venues and one training venue were constructed for the Games, while the rest were renovated. Other venues included the Asian Games Town, which consisted of the Games Village with the Athletes, Officials and Media Buildings, the Main Media Center and the International Broadcast Center.

Organizers revealed that the total investment was over ¥15 billion.

On April 19, 2009, organizers announced that they had chosen Haixinsha Island on the Pearl River as the venues for the opening and closing ceremonies. This was the first time in the history of the Games that the ceremonies were held outside the Games' main venues.

The villages at the Asian Games Town was built on a 329,024-square-meter land space which had 3,598 apartments in 49 buildings.

=== Transport ===
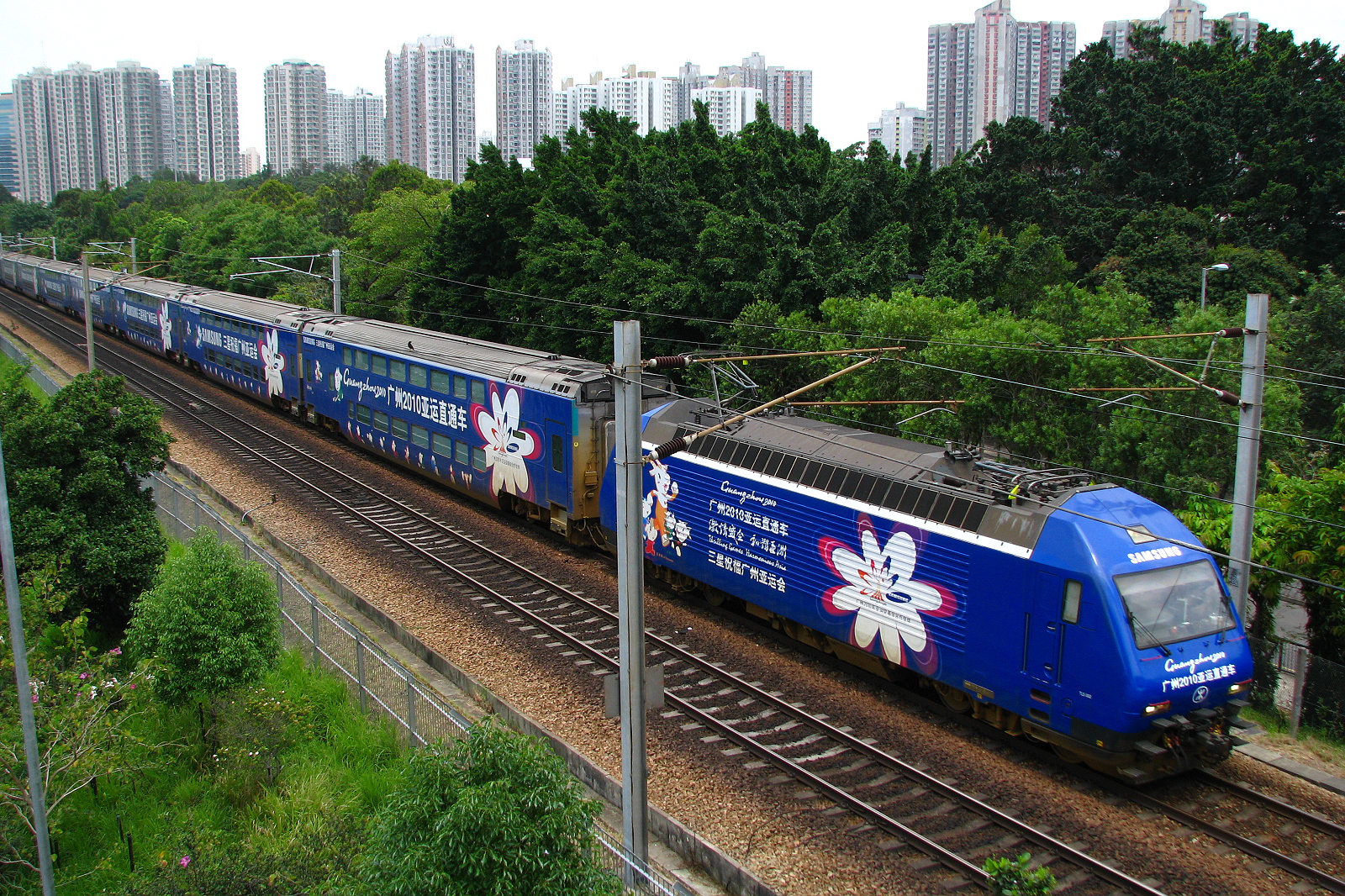
MTR KTT decorated to promote the Games.

Guangzhou's public transportation infrastructure was expanded significantly as a part of the preparation for the Games. Guangzhou Baiyun International Airport was upgraded, in contracted with Crisplant (formerly FKI Logistex), to support massive volume of passengers. A new Wuhan–Guangzhou High-Speed Railway was opened on December 26, 2009, to shorten the travel time between two destinations.

In order to ease traffic congestion and air pollution, the government ordered a 40% reduction of vehicles and offered 1,000 buses for use during the Games and Para Games. The government also had a free-ride offer for public transportation during the month of Games, but it was cancelled one week prior to the Games due to an overwhelming response from the citizens. Instead, the government offered ¥150 (US$23.26) cash subsidies to each household with permanent residence for commuting purposes.

== The Games ==
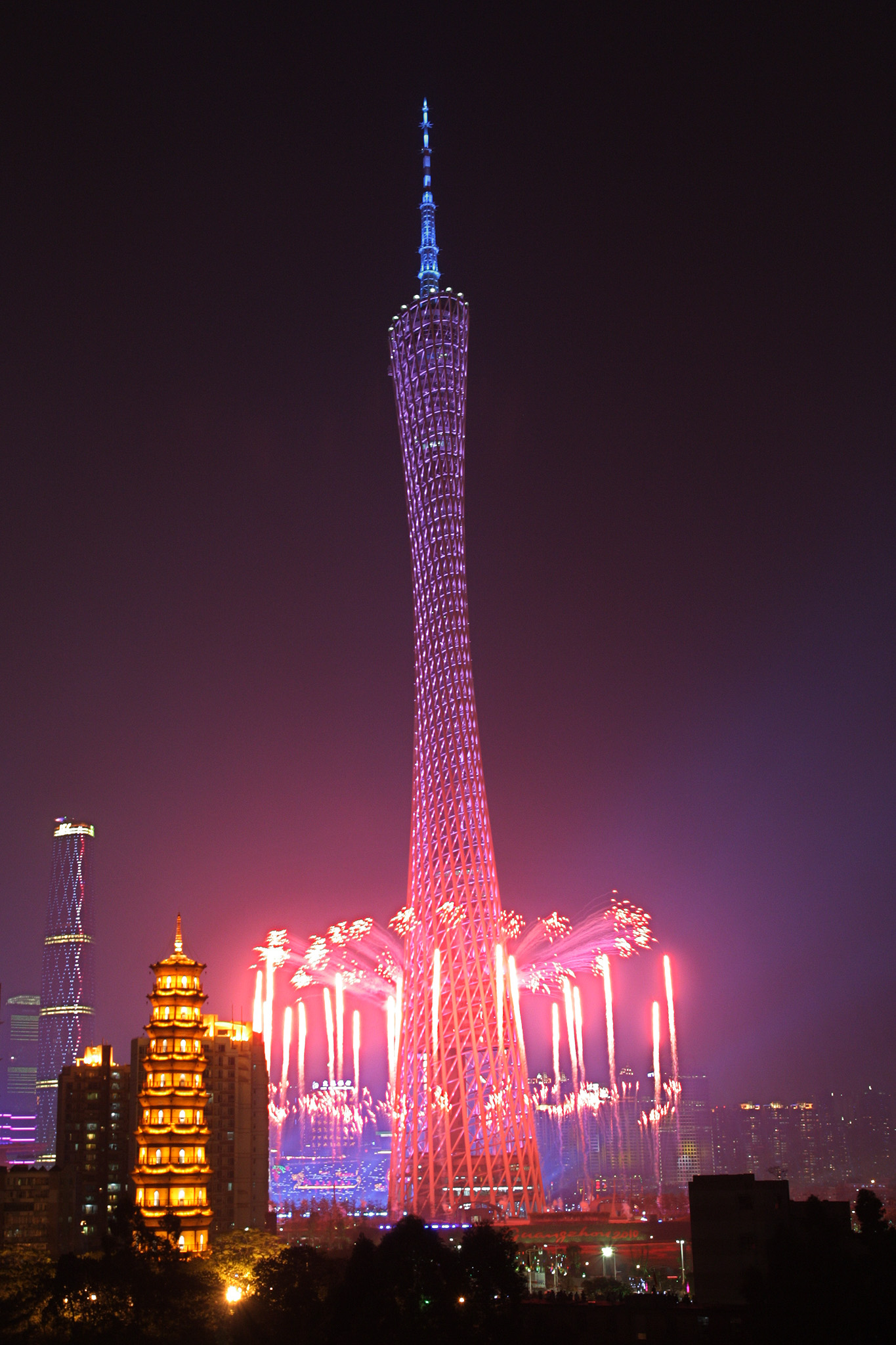
Firework display at the Canton Tower

=== Opening ceremony ===
The opening ceremony was held on November 12, 2010. For the first time in Asian Games history, the ceremony was not held in a traditional stadium setting. Instead, it was held at Haixinsha Island, using the Pearl River and Canton Tower as focal points. The ceremony was directed by Chen Weiya, assistant director of the 2008 Summer Olympics in Beijing, and featured a cast of about 6,000 performers. It was attended by the Chinese Premier, Wen Jiabao, President of Pakistan Asif Ali Zardari, Prime Minister of Thailand Abhisit Vejjajiva, Chief Secretary for Administration of Hong Kong Henry Tang, as well as OCA president Ahmed Al-Fahad Al-Ahmed Al-Sabah, and Jacques Rogge, president of the International Olympic Committee. The ceremony lasted for three hours, and together with the closing ceremony cost about ¥380 million (US$58.91 million).

Athletes were paraded by boats along the Pearl River. The ceremony featured a water-themed arts show and the culture of Guangzhou. The last torchbearer, diver He Chong, lit up the cauldron after igniting traditional Chinese firecrackers, whose flare shot up to the top of the tower where the cauldron was held.

The ceremony received positive reviews; Rogge was quoted as considering the ceremony to be "absolutely fantastic", and felt that it demonstrated the city's "ability to host the Olympics". OCA director general Husain Al-Musallam also praised the ceremony, arguing that it was unique and "just better than the Beijing Summer Olympics [opening ceremony]".

=== Sports ===
476 events were held across 42 sports (57 disciplines), including the 26 sports to be played at the 2012 Summer Olympics and 16 additional non-Olympic sports. This marked an increase from the 424 events in 39 sports held in 2006. The OCA approved the return of the Modern Pentathlon and the addition of Cricket (Twenty20) to the official program, while events in dancesport (competitive ballroom dancing), dragon boat, dragon dance, weiqi and roller sport were also held. Bodybuilding was dropped following criticism over the quality of judging in the competition at the 2006 Games.

2010 Asian Games Sports Programme
- Aquatics
  - Diving
  - Swimming
  - Synchronized swimming
  - Water polo
- Archery
- Athletics
- Badminton
- Baseball
- Basketball
- Board games
  - Chess
  - Go
  - Xiangqi
- Bowling
- Boxing
- Canoeing
  - Slalom
  - Sprint
- Cricket
- Cue sports
- Cycling
  - BMX
  - Mountain bike
  - Road
  - Track
- Dancesport
- Dragon boat
- Equestrian
  - Dressage
  - Eventing
  - Jumping
- Fencing
- Field hockey
- Football
- Golf
- Gymnastics
  - Artistic
  - Rhythmic
  - Trampoline
- Handball
- Judo
- Kabaddi
- Karate
- Modern pentathlon
- Roller sports
  - Artistic
  - Speed
- Rowing
- Rugby sevens
- Sailing
- Sepak takraw
- Shooting
- Soft tennis
- Softball
- Squash
- Table tennis
- Taekwondo
- Tennis
- Triathlon
- Volleyball
  - Beach
  - Indoor
- Weightlifting
- Wrestling
- Wushu

=== Participating National Olympic Committees ===
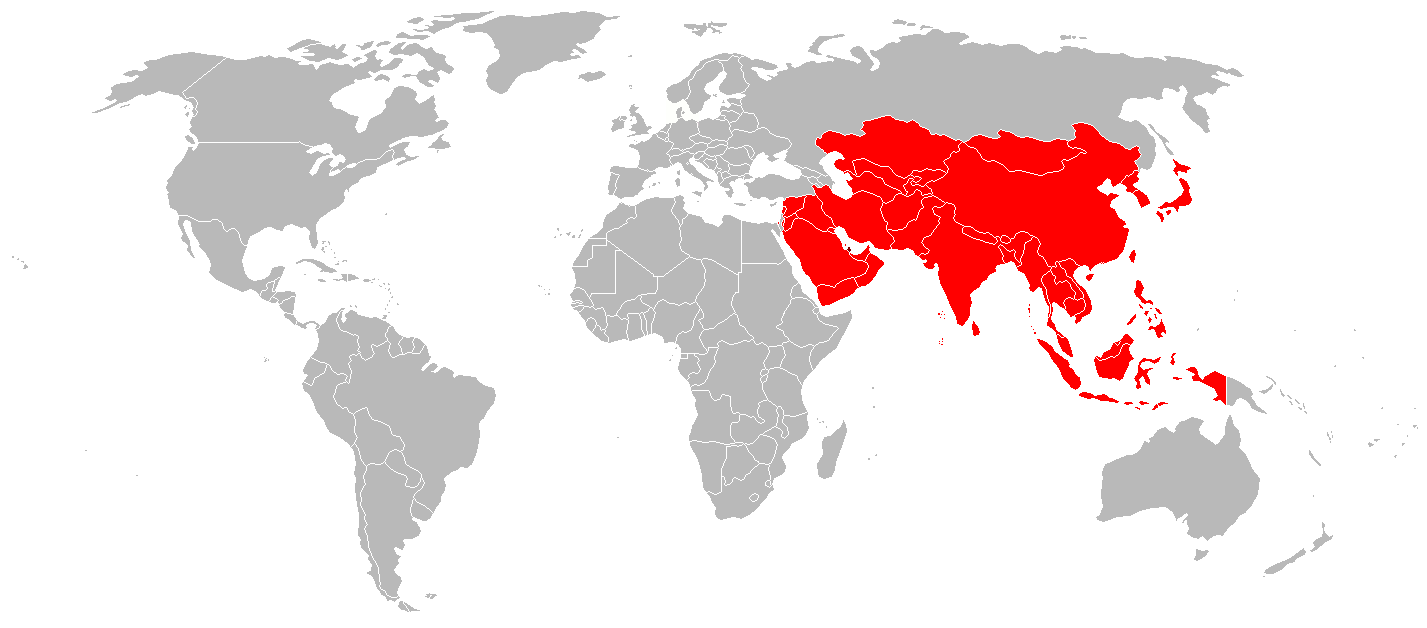
Participating countries.

All 45 members of the Olympic Council of Asia that existed as of 2010 participated in the 2010 Asian Games. All National Olympic Committees were ordered to submit their entries before September 30, 2010. Organizers allowed each NOC to submit additional entries and injury replacements after the deadline. After the final registration deadline, some 9,704 athletes, as well as some 4,750 team officials, took part in the Games, an increase of 184 athletes from the previous Asian Games in Doha. According to the Games' official website, Kuwaiti athletes participated the Games under the Olympic flag because the Kuwait Olympic Committee was suspended due to political interference in January 2010.

Below is a list of all the participating NOCs; the number of competitors per delegation is indicated in brackets.

Participating National Olympic Committees
- Afghanistan (66)
- Bahrain (82)
- Bangladesh (150)
- Bhutan (11)
- Brunei (9)
- Cambodia (22)
- China (960) (host)
- Hong Kong (401)
- India (626)
- Indonesia (216)
- Iran (362)
- Iraq (42)
- Japan (726)
- Jordan (86)
- Kazakhstan (365)
- North Korea (188)
- South Korea (788)
- Athletes from Kuwait (184)
- Kyrgyzstan (135)
- Laos (53)
- Lebanon (49)
- Macau (168)
- Malaysia (325)
- Maldives (82)
- Mongolia (219)
- Myanmar (69)
- Nepal (140)
- Oman (52)
- Pakistan (169)
- Palestine (41)
- Philippines (188)
- Qatar (250)
- Saudi Arabia (164)
- Singapore (240)
- Sri Lanka (104)
- Syria (44)
- Chinese Taipei (399)
- Tajikistan (67)
- Thailand (593)
- Timor-Leste (23)
- Turkmenistan (111)
- United Arab Emirates (84)
- Uzbekistan (220)
- Vietnam (260)
- Yemen (32)

=== Calendar ===
In the following calendar for the 2010 Asian Games, each blue box represents an event competition, such as a qualification round, on that day. The yellow boxes represent days during which medal-awarding finals for a sport were held. Each bullet in these boxes is an event final, the number of bullets per box representing the number of finals that were contested on that day. The left side of the calendar lists each sport with events held during the Games, and at the right how many gold medals were won in that sport. There is a key at the top of the calendar.

All times are in China Standard Time (UTC+8)

| OC | Opening ceremony | ● | Event competitions | 1 | Gold medal events | CC | Closing ceremony |

| November | | 7th Sun | 8th Mon | 9th Tue | 10th Wed | 11th Thu | 12th Fri | 13th Sat | 14th Sun | 15th Mon | 16th Tue | 17th Wed | 18th Thu | 19th Fri | 20th Sat | 21st Sun | 22nd Mon | 23rd Tue | 24th Wed | 25th Thu | 26th Fri | 27th Sat | Events |
|---|---|---|---|---|---|---|---|---|---|---|---|---|---|---|---|---|---|---|---|---|---|---|---|
| Ceremonies | | | | | | | OC | | | | | | | | | | | | | | | CC | —N/a |
| Aquatics | Diving | | | | | | | | | | | | | | | | 2 | 2 | 2 | 2 | 2 | | 53 |
| Aquatics | Swimming | | | | | | | 6 | 6 | 7 | 7 | 6 | 6 | | | | | | | | | | 53 |
| Aquatics | Synchronized swimming | | | | | | | | | | | | | 1 | 1 | 1 | | | | | | | 53 |
| Aquatics | Water polo | | | | | | | ● | ● | ● | ● | 1 | | ● | ● | ● | ● | ● | | 1 | | | 53 |
| Archery | | | | | | | | | | | | | | ● | ● | 1 | 1 | 1 | 1 | | | | 4 |
| Athletics | | | | | | | | | | | | | | | | 6 | 6 | 8 | 4 | 11 | 10 | 2 | 47 |
| Badminton | | | | | | | | ● | ● | 2 | ● | ● | ● | 1 | 2 | 2 | | | | | | | 7 |
| Baseball | | | | | | | | ● | ● | ● | | ● | ● | 1 | | | | | | | | | 1 |
| Basketball | | | | | | | | ● | ● | ● | ● | ● | ● | ● | ● | ● | ● | | ● | 1 | 1 | | 2 |
| Board games | Chess | | | | | | | ● | ● | ● | 2 | | ● | ● | ● | ● | ● | ● | ● | ● | 2 | | 9 |
| Board games | Go | | | | | | | | | | | | | | ● | ● | 1 | ● | ● | ● | 2 | | 9 |
| Board games | Xiangqi | | | | | | | ● | ● | ● | ● | ● | ● | 2 | | | | | | | | | 9 |
| Bowling | | | | | | | | | | 1 | 1 | 1 | 1 | ● | 2 | ● | 4 | ● | 2 | | | | 12 |
| Boxing | | | | | | | | | | | ● | ● | ● | ● | ● | ● | ● | | | 6 | 7 | | 13 |
| Canoeing | Slalom | | | | | | | ● | 2 | ● | 2 | | | | | | | | | | | | 16 |
| Canoeing | Sprint | | | | | | | | | | | | | | | | ● | ● | | 6 | 6 | | 16 |
| Cricket | | | | | | | | ● | ● | ● | ● | ● | ● | 1 | | ● | ● | ● | ● | ● | 1 | | 2 |
| Cue sports | | | | | | | | ● | 2 | 2 | 1 | 1 | 2 | 1 | 1 | | | | | | | | 10 |
| Cycling | BMX | | | | | | | | | | | | | 2 | | | | | | | | | 18 |
| Cycling | Mountain bike | | | | | | | | | | | | 2 | | | | | | | | | | 18 |
| Cycling | Road | | | | | | | | | | | | | | 2 | | 1 | 1 | | | | | 18 |
| Cycling | Track | | | | | | | 1 | 3 | ● | 2 | 4 | | | | | | | | | | | 18 |
| Dancesport | | | | | | | | 5 | 5 | | | | | | | | | | | | | | 10 |
| Dragon boat | | | | | | | | | | | | | 2 | 2 | 2 | | | | | | | | 6 |
| Equestrian | | | | | | | | | 1 | ● | | 1 | ● | ● | 2 | | 1 | | 1 | | | | 6 |
| Fencing | | | | | | | | | | | | | 2 | 2 | 2 | 2 | 2 | 2 | | | | | 12 |
| Football | | ● | ● | ● | ● | ● | | ● | ● | ● | ● | | ● | ● | ● | | 1 | ● | | 1 | | | 2 |
| Golf | | | | | | | | | | | | ● | ● | ● | 4 | | | | | | | | 4 |
| Gymnastics | Artistic | | | | | | | 1 | 1 | 2 | 5 | 5 | | | | | | | | | | | 18 |
| Gymnastics | Rhythmic | | | | | | | | | | | | | | | | | | | 1 | 1 | | 18 |
| Gymnastics | Trampolining | | | | | | | | | | | | | | | ● | 2 | | | | | | 18 |
| Handball | | | | | | | | ● | ● | ● | ● | ● | ● | ● | ● | ● | ● | ● | ● | ● | 2 | | 2 |
| Field hockey | | | | | | | | ● | ● | ● | ● | ● | ● | ● | ● | ● | ● | ● | 1 | 1 | | | 2 |
| Judo | | | | | | | | 4 | 4 | 4 | 4 | | | | | | | | | | | | 16 |
| Kabaddi | | | | | | | | | | | | | | | | | ● | ● | ● | ● | 2 | | 2 |
| Karate | | | | | | | | | | | | | | | | | | | 5 | 4 | 4 | | 13 |
| Modern pentathlon | | | | | | | | | | | | | | | | | | 2 | 2 | | | | 4 |
| Roller sports | | | | | | | | | | | | | | | | | | 4 | 2 | ● | 3 | | 9 |
| Rowing | | | | | | | | | ● | ● | ● | | 7 | 7 | | | | | | | | | 14 |
| Rugby sevens | | | | | | | | | | | | | | | | ● | ● | 2 | | | | | 2 |
| Sailing | | | | | | | | | ● | ● | ● | ● | | ● | 14 | | | | | | | | 14 |
| Sepak takraw | | | | | | | | | | | ● | ● | ● | ● | 2 | | ● | ● | 2 | ● | ● | 2 | 6 |
| Shooting | | | | | | | | 6 | 4 | 8 | 4 | 6 | 4 | 4 | | 4 | | 2 | 2 | | | | 44 |
| Softball | | | | | | | | | | | | | | ● | ● | ● | ● | ● | | ● | 1 | | 1 |
| Soft tennis | | | | | | | | ● | 2 | 1 | ● | 2 | ● | 2 | | | | | | | | | 7 |
| Squash | | | | | | | | | | | | | ● | ● | ● | 2 | ● | ● | ● | 2 | | | 4 |
| Table tennis | | | | | | | | ● | ● | ● | 2 | ● | ● | 3 | 2 | | | | | | | | 7 |
| Taekwondo | | | | | | | | | | | | 4 | 4 | 4 | 4 | | | | | | | | 16 |
| Tennis | | | | | | | | ● | ● | ● | 2 | ● | ● | ● | ● | ● | 3 | 2 | | | | | 7 |
| Triathlon | | | | | | | | 1 | 1 | | | | | | | | | | | | | | 2 |
| Volleyball | Beach | | | | | | | | | ● | ● | ● | ● | ● | ● | ● | ● | 1 | 1 | | | | 4 |
| Volleyball | Indoor | | | | | | | ● | ● | ● | ● | ● | ● | ● | ● | ● | ● | ● | ● | ● | 1 | 1 | 4 |
| Weightlifting | | | | | | | | 2 | 2 | 2 | 2 | 2 | 2 | 3 | | | | | | | | | 15 |
| Wrestling | | | | | | | | | | | | | | | | 3 | 3 | 3 | 3 | 3 | 3 | | 18 |
| Wushu | | | | | | | | 2 | 2 | 2 | 2 | 7 | | | | | | | | | | | 15 |
| Daily medal events | | | | | | | | 28 | 35 | 31 | 36 | 40 | 32 | 36 | 40 | 21 | 27 | 30 | 28 | 39 | 48 | 5 | 476 |
| Cumulative Total | | | | | | | | 28 | 63 | 94 | 130 | 170 | 202 | 238 | 278 | 299 | 326 | 356 | 384 | 423 | 471 | 476 | 476 |
| November | | 7th Sun | 8th Mon | 9th Tue | 10th Wed | 11th Thu | 12th Fri | 13th Sat | 14th Sun | 15th Mon | 16th Tue | 17th Wed | 18th Thu | 19th Fri | 20th Sat | 21st Sun | 22nd Mon | 23rd Tue | 24th Wed | 25th Thu | 26th Fri | 27th Sat | Total events |

=== Closing ceremony ===
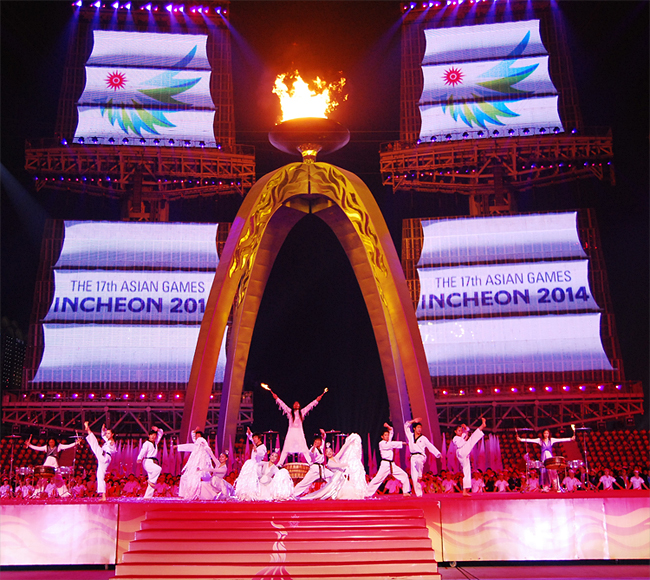
Cultural performance of Incheon, host of the 2014 Games. On the stage were the local dance troupe "Arirang Party" and Taekwondo exponents.

The closing ceremony began on November 27, 2010, at 20:06 local time in front of 35,000 spectators. The Ceremony included the handover of the Games from Guangzhou to Incheon. The Asian Games flag was symbolically handed over from the city of Guangzhou to the Mayor of Incheon Song Young-gil. Famous Korean singer, songwriter, dancer, record producer and actor Rain performed.

== Medal table ==
China led the medal table for the eighth consecutive time, setting a new record for the most number of gold medals (at 199 gold medals) won in a single Games. This bested their previous record of 183 gold medals won in the 1990 Asian Games. China became the first nation in the history of Asian Games to cross the 400 medal-mark in one edition. Macau and Bangladesh won their first Asian Games gold medals in wushu and cricket, respectively. Some 35 National Olympic Committees (except Kuwait who competed under the Olympic flag) won at least a single medal. 27 NOCs won at least a single gold medal, thus leaving nine NOCs that did not win any medal at the Games.

The top ten ranked NOCs at these Games are listed below. The host nation, China, is highlighted.

* Host nation (China)

| Rank | NOC | Gold | Silver | Bronze | Total |
|---|---|---|---|---|---|
| 1 | China* | 199 | 119 | 98 | 416 |
| 2 | South Korea | 76 | 65 | 91 | 232 |
| 3 | Japan | 48 | 74 | 94 | 216 |
| 4 | Iran | 20 | 15 | 24 | 59 |
| 5 | Kazakhstan | 18 | 23 | 38 | 79 |
| 6 | India | 14 | 17 | 34 | 65 |
| 7 | Chinese Taipei | 13 | 16 | 38 | 67 |
| 8 | Uzbekistan | 11 | 22 | 23 | 56 |
| 9 | Thailand | 11 | 9 | 32 | 52 |
| 10 | Malaysia | 9 | 18 | 14 | 41 |
| 11–36 | Remaining | 58 | 101 | 135 | 294 |
| Totals (36 entries) | | 477 | 479 | 621 | 1,577 |

== Broadcasting ==
Guangzhou Asian Games Broadcasting Co., Ltd (GAB) (Chinese: 广州亚运会转播有限公司; pinyin: Guǎngzhōu yàyùn huì zhuǎnbò yǒuxiàn gōngsī), a broadcasting consortium established on December 31, 2008, served as the host broadcaster of the games. The International Broadcast Centre was constructed within the Asian Games town.

== Concerns and controversies ==
=== Sports ===
Cricket was among the five debut sports in the Games. India, despite its historical record, decided not to send its cricket team to the Games. According to the Board of Control for Cricket in India, the decision was due to other international commitments. However, its main rivals, Pakistan and Sri Lanka, confirmed their participation.

In ten-pin bowling, the Asian Bowling Federation decided to hold matches without spectators, this resulted in protests from many delegates.

On November 17, Yang Shu-chun of Chinese Taipei was abruptly disqualified with 12 seconds left in the first round of the taekwondo competition, while leading her opponent 9–0. She was accused of having installed illegal sensors on the heel of her socks. The event quickly turned into an international incident, with officials, politicians and fans from Chinese Taipei, China and South Korea trading accusations of manipulation and fraud.

About 1,400 random doping tests were carried out during the Games. Two athletes tested positive; judoka Shokir Muminov on November 19, 2010, and Greco-Roman wrestler Jakhongir Muminov on November 24, 2010, both from Uzbekistan, tested positive for methylhexanamine. On January 24, 2011, the OCA announced another two doping failures, Qatari Ahmed Dheeb who tested positive for exogenous testosterone metabolites and Palestinian Awajna Abdalnasser who tested positive for 19-Norandrosterone.

=== Languages ===
In July 2010, the citizens of Guangzhou opposed the proposal suggested by the city committee of the Chinese People's Political Consultative Conference (CPPCC) to use Mandarin more in television news programs, rather than Guangzhou's main language, Cantonese. The debates eventually led to a series of public protests.

In late October 2010, in order to protest over the government's language policy in Tibetan areas, the Tibetan Youth Congress (TYC) used the Games as a channel to voice their concerns.

=== Environment ===
Like the 2008 Olympic Games in Beijing, Guangzhou also attempted to improve the city's air quality. The authority pledged ¥600 million to fight the problem and ordered around 32 chemical plants to stop production by the end of 2009. A report from July 13, 2010, indicated that the air quality was rated at 95.07% in 2009, an increase of 12.01% since 2004; this improvement eventually cost authorities ¥24 billion. Subsequent action from organizers to curb pollution included decreasing the movement of vehicles up to 40% and banning barbecue stalls in 11 cities.

Between 2005 and 2008 about 150 Guolang villagers survived by growing tomatoes, beans, and cabbages while fighting the government for fairer compensation after their homes were flattened for Asian Games infrastructure. The Panyu government set aside a date to listen to petitioners' complaint on October 18, 2010.

Prior to the opening of the games, Conghua reported 429 cases of norovirus outbreak. The government officials stressed that the people affected recovered before November 12.

== See also ==
- 1990 Asian Games
- 2008 Summer Olympics
- 2008 Summer Paralympics
- 2009 Winter Universiade
- 2011 Summer Universiade
- 2021 FISU Summer World University Games
- 2022 Asian Games
- List of IOC country codes

| Preceded by Doha | Asian Games; Guangzhou; XVI Asian Games (2010) | Succeeded by Incheon |
