= 2015 World Taekwondo Championships – Men's bantamweight =

Taekwondo competition

Men's bantamweight at the 2015 World Championships
- Venue: Traktor Ice Arena
- Dates: 17–18 May 2015
- Competitors: 67 from 66 nations

Medalists
gold medal	Jaouad Achab
silver medal	Joel González	Spain
bronze medal	Abolfazl Yaghoubi	Iran
bronze medal	Saúl Gutiérrez	Mexico

The men's bantamweight is a competition featured at the 2015 World Taekwondo Championships, and was held at the Traktor Ice Arena in Chelyabinsk, Russia on May 17 and 18. Bantamweights were limited to a maximum of 63 kilograms in body mass.

== Results ==
Legend

- DQ — Won by disqualification
- R — Won by referee stop contest

=== Finals ===
Quarterfinals		Semifinals		Final
Jaouad Achab (WTF)	24
Stevens Barclais (FRA)	12	Jaouad Achab (WTF)	9
Abolfazl Yaghoubi (IRI)	15	Abolfazl Yaghoubi (IRI)	8
Vladimir Kim (RUS)	3			Jaouad Achab (WTF)	7
Saúl Gutiérrez (MEX)	9			Joel González (ESP)	6
Lovre Brečić (CRO)	7	Saúl Gutiérrez (MEX)	5
Mário Silva (POR)	0	Joel González (ESP)	6
Joel González (ESP)	1

=== Top half ===
==== Section 1 ====
Round of 128
Thandukukhanya Dlamini (SWZ)	7
Daniel Turnov (BUL)	19

Round of 64
Jaouad Achab (WTF)	10
Daniel Turnov (BUL)	8
Federico González (URU)	DQ
~~Mohanad Al-Yaremi (YEM)~~
Huang Cheng-ching (TPE)	12
Ahmad Roman Abasi (AFG)	1
Eduard Frankford (AUT)	DQ
~~Bernardo Pié (DOM)~~

Round of 32
Jaouad Achab (WTF)	16
Federico González (URU)	1
Huang Cheng-ching (TPE)	13
Eduard Frankford (AUT)	1

Round of 16
Jaouad Achab (WTF)	18
Huang Cheng-ching (TPE)	4

==== Section 2 ====
Round of 128

Round of 64
Stevens Barclais (FRA)	15
Andy Mahery Loïc (MAD)	3
Sodiki Tadjou (CIV)	2
Ignacio Morales (CHI)	14
Pürevjavyn Temüüjin (MGL)	DQ
~~Vincent Lim (SIN)~~
Song Guodong (CHN)	10
Akkarin Kitwijarn (THA)	16

Round of 32
Stevens Barclais (FRA)	12
Ignacio Morales (CHI)	11
Pürevjavyn Temüüjin (MGL)	16
Akkarin Kitwijarn (THA)	19

Round of 16
Stevens Barclais (FRA)	6
Akkarin Kitwijarn (THA)	5

==== Section 3 ====
Round of 128
Faisal Al-Rushaidi (QAT)	13
Arlindo Semedo (CPV)	2

Round of 64
Ouahid Briki (TUN)	3
Faisal Al-Rushaidi (QAT)	2
Davilani Cruz (BRA)	10
Abolfazl Yaghoubi (IRI)	14
Raad Thabet (JOR)	18
Abdelkadre Alio (CHA)	5
Edwin Aguilar (COL)	8
Jure Pantar (SLO)	3

Round of 32
Ouahid Briki (TUN)	3
Abolfazl Yaghoubi (IRI)	15
Raad Thabet (JOR)	15
Edwin Aguilar (COL)	8

Round of 16
Abolfazl Yaghoubi (IRI)	8
Raad Thabet (JOR)	3

==== Section 4 ====
Round of 128
Döwran Durdyýew (TKM)	39
Loveton Chea (LBR)	26

Round of 64
Ioannis Pilavakis (CYP)	9
Darkhan Kassymkulov (KAZ)	10
Victor Mokwena (BOT)	0
Gili Haimovitz (ISR)	43^{R}
Jarosław Mecmajer (POL)	13
Ng Chi Hou (MAC)	1
Döwran Durdyýew (TKM)	2
Vladimir Kim (RUS)	19

Round of 32
Darkhan Kassymkulov (KAZ)	10
Gili Haimovitz (ISR)	7
Jarosław Mecmajer (POL)	8
Vladimir Kim (RUS)	13

Round of 16
Darkhan Kassymkulov (KAZ)	7
Vladimir Kim (RUS)	8

=== Bottom half ===
==== Section 5 ====
Round of 128
Hakob Ghazaryan (ARM)	23
Argen Tashanov (KGZ)	11

Round of 64
Saúl Gutiérrez (MEX)	15
Hakob Ghazaryan (ARM)	6
Jibreel Malik (GUY)	3
Yahor Dunayeu (BLR)	11
Andrei Rotaru (MDA)	14
Butrint Ejupi (KOS)	6
Merab Shukakidze (GEO)	1
Siddhartha Bhat (CAN)	13

Round of 32
Saúl Gutiérrez (MEX)	10
Yahor Dunayeu (BLR)	5
Andrei Rotaru (MDA)	2
Siddhartha Bhat (CAN)	14

Round of 16
Saúl Gutiérrez (MEX)	2
Siddhartha Bhat (CAN)	1

==== Section 6 ====
Round of 128

Round of 64
Lovre Brečić (CRO)	14
Placide Bagabo (RWA)	1
Marumo Moloisane (LES)	9
Nikola Vučković (SRB)	11
Chase Graham (USA)	6
Akhmed Odilbekov (TJK)	8
Uno Sanli (SWE)	4
Mohamed Asal (EGY)	16

Round of 32
Lovre Brečić (CRO)	16
Nikola Vučković (SRB)	3
Akhmed Odilbekov (TJK)	5
Mohamed Asal (EGY)	17

Round of 16
Lovre Brečić (CRO)	11
Mohamed Asal (EGY)	2

==== Section 7 ====
Round of 128

Round of 64
Mário Silva (POR)	DQ
~~Mohanad Sirag El-Nor (SUD)~~
Houcine Zaouia (NED)	8
Vladyslav Yarmachek (UKR)	9
Diego Camacho (ECU)	8
Gustavo Machado (VEN)	9
Lorenz Chavez (PHI)	18
Jordan Gayle (GBR)	16

Round of 32
Mário Silva (POR)	10
Vladyslav Yarmachek (UKR)	5
Gustavo Machado (VEN)	11
Lorenz Chavez (PHI)	6

Round of 16
Mário Silva (POR)	11
Gustavo Machado (VEN)	3

==== Section 8 ====
Round of 128
Visar Pitushi (ALB)	7
Lesego Maponyane (RSA)	19

Round of 64
Joel González (ESP)	14
Shahid Akbar (PAK)	1
Oumar Sissoko (MLI)	13
Thomas Auger (AUS)	19
Simone Crescenzi (ITA)	14
Ömer Ramazan Evez (TUR)	12
Lesego Maponyane (RSA)	2
Lee Dae-hoon (KOR)	15

Round of 32
Joel González (ESP)	10
Thomas Auger (AUS)	5
Simone Crescenzi (ITA)	4
Lee Dae-hoon (KOR)	15

Round of 16
Joel González (ESP)	4
Lee Dae-hoon (KOR)	3
