= 2013 World Taekwondo Championships – Men's bantamweight =

Taekwondo competition

Men's bantamweight at the 2013 World Championships
- Venue: Exhibition Center of Puebla
- Dates: 20 July 2013
- Competitors: 64 from 63 nations

Medalists
gold medal	Lee Dae-hoon	South Korea
silver medal	Abel Mendoza	Mexico
bronze medal	Wei Chen-yang	Chinese Taipei
bronze medal	Stevens Barclais	France

The men's bantamweight is a competition featured at the 2013 World Taekwondo Championships, and was held at the Exhibition Center of Puebla in Puebla, Mexico on July 20. Bantamweights were limited to a maximum of 63 kilograms in body mass.

== Results ==
- DQ — Won by disqualification
- R — Won by referee stop contest

=== Finals ===
Semifinals		Final
Wei Chen-yang (TPE)	7
Lee Dae-hoon (KOR)	9^{R}	Lee Dae-hoon (KOR)	16
Abel Mendoza (MEX)	4	Abel Mendoza (MEX)	4
Stevens Barclais (FRA)	3

=== Top half ===
==== Section 1 ====
Round of 64
Ouahid Briki (TUN)	8
Pablo Solano (CRC)	2
Seddik Megraoui (CAN)	6
Dário Facada (ANG)	3
Liran Malachi (ISR)	7
Klint Azuni (ALB)	3
Paul Romero (PHI)	4
Thomas Auger (AUS)	5
Olie Burton (USA)	2
Jaouad Achab (BEL)	7
Danilo Di Maggio (ITA)	9
Aleksey Denisenko (RUS)	8
Lê Huỳnh Châu (VIE)	4
Williams Cortez (VEN)	3
Wei Chen-yang (TPE)	5
Jure Pantar (SLO)	3

Round of 32
Ouahid Briki (TUN)	7
Seddik Megraoui (CAN)	1
Liran Malachi (ISR)	5
Thomas Auger (AUS)	12
Jaouad Achab (BEL)	11
Danilo Di Maggio (ITA)	8
Lê Huỳnh Châu (VIE)	0
Wei Chen-yang (TPE)	5

Round of 16
Ouahid Briki (TUN)	14
Thomas Auger (AUS)	0
Jaouad Achab (BEL)	3
Wei Chen-yang (TPE)	4

Quarterfinals
Ouahid Briki (TUN)	1
Wei Chen-yang (TPE)	2

==== Section 2 ====
Round of 64
Hamza Gbané (CIV)	0
Joel González (ESP)	14
Raad Thabet (JOR)	7
Hamilton Motawana (RSA)	12
Temataarii Tehane (FPO)	10
Bruce Rickman (JAM)	9
Allain Bagire (RWA)	1
Mohamed Asal (EGY)	13
Rafik Zohri (NED)	12
Johny Vanlalruatsanga (WTF)	5
Felipe Kenji (BRA)	2
Mohammad Khamseh (IRI)	6
Djibril Nkori (GAB)	5
Shen Yu (CHN)	10
Andrés Zelaya (GUA)	3
Lee Dae-hoon (KOR)	16

Round of 32
Joel González (ESP)	5
Hamilton Motawana (RSA)	0
Temataarii Tehane (FPO)	5
Mohamed Asal (EGY)	11
Rafik Zohri (NED)	2
Mohammad Khamseh (IRI)	10
Shen Yu (CHN)	1
Lee Dae-hoon (KOR)	13

Round of 16
Joel González (ESP)	6
Mohamed Asal (EGY)	5
Mohammad Khamseh (IRI)	3
Lee Dae-hoon (KOR)	15

Quarterfinals
Joel González (ESP)	8
Lee Dae-hoon (KOR)	21

=== Bottom half ===
==== Section 3 ====
Round of 64
Abel Mendoza (MEX)	5
Conor Grassick (IRL)	4
Bryan Blanco (CHI)	5
Edwin Aguilar (COL)	7
Nikola Vučković (SRB)	6
Federico González (URU)	3
~~Andrew MacDonald (UGA)~~
Tomislav Karaula (CRO)	DQ
Yuki Mitsuhashi (JPN)	7
Nursultan Mamayev (KAZ)	9
Pürevjavyn Temüüjin (MGL)	DQ
~~Anton Aitsi (PNG)~~
Kirk Causadias (PAN)	DQ
~~Mactar Diao (SEN)~~
Bhekisisa Nkambule (SWZ)	6
Cem Uluğnuyan (TUR)	8

Round of 32
Abel Mendoza (MEX)	21
Edwin Aguilar (COL)	7
Nikola Vučković (SRB)	3
Tomislav Karaula (CRO)	4
Nursultan Mamayev (KAZ)	16
Pürevjavyn Temüüjin (MGL)	7
Kirk Causadias (PAN)	1
Cem Uluğnuyan (TUR)	2^{R}

Round of 16
Abel Mendoza (MEX)	7
Tomislav Karaula (CRO)	1
Nursultan Mamayev (KAZ)	3
Cem Uluğnuyan (TUR)	6

Quarterfinals
Abel Mendoza (MEX)	14
Cem Uluğnuyan (TUR)	5

==== Section 4 ====
Round of 64
Stevens Barclais (FRA)	DQ
~~Jaber Jamal Al-Ali (UAE)~~
Mesfer Al-Ajmi (KUW)	15
Malcolm Holmes (NZL)	5
Ryan Chong (MAS)	3
Oleksandr Khomenko (UKR)	1
Eric Guzmán (DOM)	2
Vasileios Gaitanis (GRE)	10
Andrei Rotaru (MDA)	12
Faisal Jeylani Aweys (SOM)	0
Akkarin Kitwijarn (THA)	17
Ioannis Pilavakis (CYP)	8
Fariz Aliyev (AZE)	15
Carlos Erazo (HON)	3
Ruslan Yarashevich (BLR)	2
Michael Harvey (GBR)	15

Round of 32
Stevens Barclais (FRA)	6
Mesfer Al-Ajmi (KUW)	1
Ryan Chong (MAS)	10
Vasileios Gaitanis (GRE)	7
Andrei Rotaru (MDA)	5
Akkarin Kitwijarn (THA)	6
Fariz Aliyev (AZE)	6
Michael Harvey (GBR)	9

Round of 16
Stevens Barclais (FRA)	15
Ryan Chong (MAS)	3
Akkarin Kitwijarn (THA)	6
Michael Harvey (GBR)	19

Quarterfinals
Stevens Barclais (FRA)	7
Michael Harvey (GBR)	4
