= Taekwondo at the 2014 Asian Games – Men's 63 kg =

Taekwondo competition

Men's 63 kg at the 2014 Asian Games
- Venue: Ganghwa Dolmens Gymnasium
- Date: 2 October 2014
- Competitors: 21 from 21 nations

Medalists
gold medal	Lee Dae-hoon	South Korea
silver medal	Akkarin Kitwijarn	Thailand
bronze medal	Chen Yen-ming	Chinese Taipei
bronze medal	Ahmad Roman Abasi	Afghanistan

The men's bantamweight (63 kilograms) event at the 2014 Asian Games took place on 2 October 2014 at Ganghwa Dolmens Gymnasium, Incheon, South Korea.

== Schedule ==
All times are Korea Standard Time (UTC+09:00)

Date	Time	Event
Thursday, 2 October 2014	09:30	Round of 32
Thursday, 2 October 2014	09:30	Round of 16
Thursday, 2 October 2014	15:30	Quarterfinals
Thursday, 2 October 2014	15:30	Semifinals
Thursday, 2 October 2014	18:00	Final

== Results ==
=== Final ===
Final
Akkarin Kitwijarn (THA)	2
Lee Dae-hoon (KOR)	18

=== Top half ===
Round of 32
Arsalan Asad Khan (PAK)	5
Chen Yen-ming (TPE)	13
Raad Thabet (JOR)	4
Lê Huỳnh Châu (VIE)	5
Douangsivilay Phimmasone (LAO)	1
Akkarin Kitwijarn (THA)	13

Round of 16
Ryan Chong (MAS)	2
Chen Yen-ming (TPE)	3
Poon Chun Ho (HKG)	2
Davlatmurod Karimov (TJK)	1
Saud Al-Muwallad (KSA)	3
Lê Huỳnh Châu (VIE)	4
Akkarin Kitwijarn (THA)	12
Elias El-Hayek (LIB)	2

Quarterfinals
Chen Yen-ming (TPE)	12
Poon Chun Ho (HKG)	10
Lê Huỳnh Châu (VIE)	1
Akkarin Kitwijarn (THA)	4

Semifinals
Chen Yen-ming (TPE)	2
Akkarin Kitwijarn (THA)	5

=== Bottom half ===
Round of 32
Klimentii Kim (KGZ)	4
Ahmad Roman Abasi (AFG)	7
Yasuhiro Hamada (JPN)	9
Pürevjavyn Temüüjin (MGL)	5

Round of 16
Yaser Bamatraf (YEM)	5
Ahmad Roman Abasi (AFG)	6
Sujan Joshi (NEP)	5
Saurav Sharma (IND)	8
Yerassyl Kaiyrbek (KAZ)	1
Lee Dae-hoon (KOR)	13
Yasuhiro Hamada (JPN)	14
Şanepes Hudaýberdiýew (TKM)	1

Quarterfinals
Ahmad Roman Abasi (AFG)	5
Saurav Sharma (IND)	4
Lee Dae-hoon (KOR)	13
Yasuhiro Hamada (JPN)	1

Semifinals
Ahmad Roman Abasi (AFG)	1
Lee Dae-hoon (KOR)	13
