= 2016 Pan American Taekwondo Olympic Qualification Tournament =

Taekwondo competition

The 2016 Pan American Qualification Tournament for Rio Olympic Games was held in Aguascalientes, Mexico from March 10 to March 11, 2016. Each country may enter maximum 2 male and 2 female divisions with only one in each division and the first two ranked athletes per weight division qualify their NOCs a place each for Olympic Games.

== Qualification summary ==
NOC	Men				Women				Total
NOC	−58kg	−68kg	−80kg	+80kg	−49kg	−57kg	−67kg	+67kg	Total
Aruba					X				1
Canada							X		1
Chile		X							1
Colombia	X					X			2
Cuba				X					1
Dominican Republic	X		X					X	3
Panama						X			1
Peru					X				1
Puerto Rico								X	1
United States			X	X			X		3
Venezuela		X							1
Total: 11 NOCs	2	2	2	2	2	2	2	2	16

== Men ==
=== −58 kg ===
11 March

Round of 16
Francisco Rodríguez (ESA)	2
Leyner Congo (ECU)	7
Jorge Martínez (NCA)	0
John Jairo Maduro (ARU)	2
Diego Acuña (BOL)	6
Sven Lorrimer (GUY)	3

Quarterfinals
Lucas Guzmán (ARG)	4
Leyner Congo (ECU)	8
Francisco Palacios (GUA)	4
Óscar Muñoz (COL)	4
Heiner Oviedo (CRC)	2
John Jairo Maduro (ARU)	2
Diego Acuña (BOL)
Luisito Pié (DOM)	WD

Semifinals
Leyner Congo (ECU)	6
Óscar Muñoz (COL)	12
Heiner Oviedo (CRC)	1
Luisito Pié (DOM)	9

Final
Óscar Muñoz (COL)	0
Luisito Pié (DOM)	3

=== −68 kg ===
11 March

Round of 16
Peter López (PER)	1
Tosh van Dijk (SUR)	1
Edgar Contreras (VEN)	6
Franco Ríos (BOL)	3
Sebastián Chavarría (NCA)	5
Andrés Zelaya (GUA)	4
Norman Florentin (PAR)	2
Federico González (URU)	6
Miguel Trejos (COL)	3
Víctor Zepeda (HON)	2

Quarterfinals
Maxime Potvin (CAN)	6
Peter López (PER)	5
Edgar Contreras (VEN)	12
Sebastián Chavarría (NCA)	3
Ignacio Morales (CHI)	5
Federico González (URU)	4
Miguel Trejos (COL)	5
Luis Colon (PUR)	4

Semifinals
Maxime Potvin (CAN)	3
Edgar Contreras (VEN)	6
Ignacio Morales (CHI)	12
Miguel Trejos (COL)	9

Final
Edgar Contreras (VEN)	WD
Ignacio Morales (CHI)

=== −80 kg ===
10 March

Round of 16
Craig Brown (JAM)	1
Lenn Hypolite (TTO)	2
Miguel Ferrera (HON)	1
Carlos Ruano (ESA)	3
Bryan Morales (CRC)	6
Elvis Barbosa (PUR)	11
Elías Robles (CHI)	5
Giavero Sabajo (SUR)	2

Quarterfinals
Steven López (USA)	9
Lenn Hypolite (TTO)	8
Carlos Ruano (ESA)	1
José Cobas (CUB)	13
Moisés Hernández (DOM)	10
Elvis Barbosa (PUR)	2
Elías Robles (CHI)	2
Sebastián Crismanich (ARG)	8

Semifinals
Steven López (USA)	4
José Cobas (CUB)	3
Moisés Hernández (DOM)	2
Sebastián Crismanich (ARG)	1

Final
Steven López (USA)	3
Moisés Hernández (DOM)	0

=== +80 kg ===
10 March

Round of 16
Douglas Townsend (ISV)	4
Edson Breedy (TTO)	3
Braian Elliot (URU)	4
Stuart Smit (ARU)	7
Tudor Sanon (HAI)	1
Jesús Perea (ECU)	6
Jayson Grant (JAM)	6
Adrian Spellen (GUY)	2

Quarterfinals
Rafael Alba (CUB)	7
Douglas Townsend (ISV)	0
Stuart Smit (ARU)	1
Carlos Rivas (VEN)	3
Stephen Lambdin (USA)	3
Jesús Perea (ECU)	2
Jayson Grant (JAM)	0
Marc-André Bergeron (CAN)	5

Semifinals
Rafael Alba (CUB)	13
Carlos Rivas (VEN)	5
Stephen Lambdin (USA)	2
Marc-André Bergeron (CAN)	1

Final
Rafael Alba (CUB)	WD
Stephen Lambdin (USA)

== Women ==
=== −49 kg ===
10 March

Round of 16
Natalia Stanziola (PAN)	2
Candelaria Marte (DOM)	7
Francisca Ríos (CHI)	3
Darly Mina (ECU)	0
Solansh Vargas (NCA)	0
Monica Pimentel (ARU)	9
Rosario Bonilla (GUA)	1
Victoria Stambaugh (PUR)	3
Cyriesse Hall (JAM)	10
Melissa Joseph (TTO)	0

Quarterfinals
Yvette Yong (CAN)	7
Candelaria Marte (DOM)	9
Francisca Ríos (CHI)	1
Monica Pimentel (ARU)	2
Virginia Dellán (VEN)	3
Victoria Stambaugh (PUR)	6
Cyriesse Hall (JAM)	0
Julissa Diez Canseco (PER)	0

Semifinals
Candelaria Marte (DOM)	1
Monica Pimentel (ARU)	2
Victoria Stambaugh (PUR)	3
Julissa Diez Canseco (PER)	4

Final
Monica Pimentel (ARU)	1
Julissa Diez Canseco (PER)	2

=== −57 kg ===
10 March

Round of 16
Karina Brade (CRC)	3
Estefani Zambrano (BOL)	0
Yuliena Pedroza (GUA)	1
Dayana Seni (ECU)	11

Quarterfinals
Carolena Carstens (PAN)	12
Karina Brade (CRC)	0
Luciana Angiolillo (ARG)	1
Adriana Martínez (VEN)	2
Yamicel Núñez (CUB)	1
Laura Vásquez (ESA)	0
Dayana Seni (ECU)	1
Doris Patiño (COL)	2

Semifinals
Carolena Carstens (PAN)	1
Adriana Martínez (VEN)	0
Yamicel Núñez (CUB)	2
Doris Patiño (COL)	2

Final
Carolena Carstens (PAN)	10
Doris Patiño (COL)	0

=== −67 kg ===
11 March

Quarterfinals		Semifinals		Final
Paige McPherson (USA)	1
Fabiola Escobar (ESA)	0	Paige McPherson (USA)	3
Alexis Arnoldt (ARG)	0	Alexis Arnoldt (ARG)	2
Katherine Alvarado (CRC)	0			Paige McPherson (USA)	4
Katherine Dumar (COL)	2			Melissa Pagnotta (CAN)	3
Yosselyn Molina (HON)	0	Katherine Dumar (COL)	3
Aniya Louissaint (HAI)	1	Melissa Pagnotta (CAN)	5
Melissa Pagnotta (CAN)	4

=== +67 kg ===
11 March

Quarterfinals		Semifinals		Final
		Keyla Ávila (HON)	0
Danese Joseph (ISV)		Crystal Weekes (PUR)	6
Crystal Weekes (PUR)	PUN			Crystal Weekes (PUR)	1
				Katherine Rodríguez (DOM)	2
		Glenhis Hernández (CUB)	1
		Katherine Rodríguez (DOM)	3
