= 2011 World Taekwondo Championships – Men's flyweight =

Taekwondo competition

Men's flyweight at the 2011 World Championships
- Venue: Gyeongju Indoor Stadium
- Dates: 1–2 May 2011
- Competitors: 81 from 81 nations

Medalists
gold medal	Joel González	Spain
silver medal	Rui Bragança	Portugal
bronze medal	Wei Chen-yang	Chinese Taipei
bronze medal	Gabriel Mercedes	Dominican Republic

The Men's flyweight is a competition featured at the 2011 World Taekwondo Championships, and was held at the Gyeongju Gymnasium in Gyeongju, South Korea on May 1 and May 2.

Flyweights were limited to a maximum of 58 kilograms in body mass.

== Results ==
Legend

- DQ — Won by disqualification
- P — Won by punitive declaration

=== Finals ===
Quarterfinals		Semifinals		Final
Joel González (ESP)	8
Xu Yongzeng (CHN)	2	Joel González (ESP)	3
Ruslan Poiseev (RUS)	9	Wei Chen-yang (TPE)	1
Wei Chen-yang (TPE)	12			Joel González (ESP)	4
James Howe (USA)	4			Rui Bragança (POR)	1
Gabriel Mercedes (DOM)	7	Gabriel Mercedes (DOM)	1
Rui Bragança (POR)	4	Rui Bragança (POR)	2
Mahmood Haidari (AFG)	3

=== Top half ===
==== Section 1 ====
Round of 128
~~Abdulla Mohamed (UAE)~~
Mohamed Ali Melghagh (MAR)	DQ
Naskhidin Vorisov (TJK)	3
Gylan Al-Atroushi (AUS)	2
Kenny Ly Quang (CAN)	0
Yasin Akbarnattaj (IRI)	4

Round of 64
Joel González (ESP)	8
Mohamed Ali Melghagh (MAR)	0
~~Patricio Moreira (ECU)~~
Jhonnatan Mejía (GUA)	DQ
Husam Suleiman (JOR)	1
Naskhidin Vorisov (TJK)	2
Yasin Akbarnattaj (IRI)	8
Makhtar Ngom (SEN)	4

Round of 32
Joel González (ESP)	12
Jhonnatan Mejía (GUA)	0
Naskhidin Vorisov (TJK)	10
Yasin Akbarnattaj (IRI)	6

Round of 16
Joel González (ESP)	10
Naskhidin Vorisov (TJK)	3

==== Section 2 ====
Round of 128
Khosbayaryn Bilgüün (MGL)	0
Ong Stevanus (INA)	3
Dmytro Lyzun (UKR)	DQ
~~Ali Omar (KEN)~~

Round of 64
Xu Yongzeng (CHN)	5
Ong Stevanus (INA)	1
Hasnain Hussain (NOR)	DQ
~~Omran Saedah (PLE)~~
Kevin Ngitngit (PHI)	1
Hadi Karam (LIB)	0
Dmytro Lyzun (UKR)	0
Tamer Bayoumi (EGY)	2

Round of 32
Xu Yongzeng (CHN)	2
Hasnain Hussain (NOR)	1
Kevin Ngitngit (PHI)	3
Tamer Bayoumi (EGY)	14

Round of 16
Xu Yongzeng (CHN)	8
Tamer Bayoumi (EGY)	7

==== Section 3 ====
Round of 128
~~Audy Muller (AHO)~~
Kinley Penjor (BHU)	DQ
~~Hassana Dzire (CMR)~~
Heiner Oviedo (CRC)	DQ

Round of 64
Pen-ek Karaket (THA)	6
Kinley Penjor (BHU)	2
Rahem Nour El-Islam (ALG)	1
Renzo Mendoza (BOL)	3
Lim Chul-ho (KOR)	DQ
~~Tameem Al-Kubati (YEM)~~
Heiner Oviedo (CRC)	6
Ruslan Poiseev (RUS)	17

Round of 32
Pen-ek Karaket (THA)	15
Renzo Mendoza (BOL)	3
Lim Chul-ho (KOR)	4
Ruslan Poiseev (RUS)	15

Round of 16
Pen-ek Karaket (THA)	9
Ruslan Poiseev (RUS)	12

==== Section 4 ====
Round of 128
~~Nigel Cyril Ras (ARU)~~
Jermaine James (SUI)	DQ
~~Cédric Botalatala (COD)~~
Ng Wai Kin (MAC)	DQ

Round of 64
~~Mario Leal (VEN)~~
Jermaine James (SUI)	DQ
Uno Sanli (SWE)	1
Seydou Niang (MLI)	0
Leung Wai Yip (HKG)	DQ
~~Gerardo Torres (PUR)~~
Ng Wai Kin (MAC)	0
Wei Chen-yang (TPE)	13

Round of 32
Jermaine James (SUI)	14
Uno Sanli (SWE)	9
Leung Wai Yip (HKG)	1
Wei Chen-yang (TPE)	5

Round of 16
Jermaine James (SUI)	2
Wei Chen-yang (TPE)	4

=== Bottom half ===
==== Section 5 ====
Round of 128
Andrei Rotaru (MDA)	DQ
~~Ahmed Kamal (SUD)~~
Krasimir Tomanov (BUL)	8
Mahmoud Salam (IRQ)	2

Round of 64
~~Salem Mohamed Fard (LBA)~~
Andrei Rotaru (MDA)	DQ
Arnold Torres (CHI)	0
Jocelyn Joseph (HAI)	1
Rustamjon Pulatov (UZB)	11
Tarekegne Soleba (ETH)	3
Krasimir Tomanov (BUL)	0
James Howe (USA)	11

Round of 32
Andrei Rotaru (MDA)	5
Jocelyn Joseph (HAI)	3
Rustamjon Pulatov (UZB)	3
James Howe (USA)	6

Round of 16
Andrei Rotaru (MDA)	6
James Howe (USA)	7

==== Section 6 ====
Round of 128
Abdulrahim Abdulhameed (BRN)	1
Zhalgas Bekkassymov (KAZ)	6
~~Siaosi Veatupu (TGA)~~
Elton Burnazi (ALB)	DQ

Round of 64
Fırat Pozan (TUR)	6
Zhalgas Bekkassymov (KAZ)	1
Liran Malachi (ISR)	8
Aman Kumar (IND)	9
~~Avin Maharaj (TRI)~~
Marius Vina (ROU)	DQ
Elton Burnazi (ALB)	1
Gabriel Mercedes (DOM)	5^{P}

Round of 32
Fırat Pozan (TUR)	5
Aman Kumar (IND)	1
Marius Vina (ROU)	2
Gabriel Mercedes (DOM)	8

Round of 16
Fırat Pozan (TUR)	1
Gabriel Mercedes (DOM)	2

==== Section 7 ====
Round of 128
Sandris Radziņš (LAT)	0
Wu Yu Tai (RSA)	7
Nikola Raičević (MNE)	1
Douangsivilay Phimmasone (LAO)	6

Round of 64
Damián Villa (MEX)	7
Wu Yu Tai (RSA)	2
Haykaz Samvelyan (ARM)	13
Damiao Licuco (MOZ)	0
Antonis Kyriakou (CYP)	11
Ziya Gasimov (AZE)	12
Douangsivilay Phimmasone (LAO)	1
Rui Bragança (POR)	3

Round of 32
Damián Villa (MEX)	10
Haykaz Samvelyan (ARM)	6
Ziya Gasimov (AZE)	4
Rui Bragança (POR)	6

Round of 16
Damián Villa (MEX)	2
Rui Bragança (POR)	3

==== Section 8 ====
Round of 128
Gabriele Crisafulli (ITA)	4
Floris Bazebizonza (CGO)	1
~~Óscar Muñoz (COL)~~
Yuma Matsui (JPN)	DQ

Round of 64
Stipe Jarloni (CRO)	10
Gabriele Crisafulli (ITA)	0
Mahmood Haidari (AFG)	6
Moussa Cissé (FRA)	5
Philip Reyes (DEN)	6
Marios Tsourdinis (GRE)	5
Yuma Matsui (JPN)	2
Márcio Wenceslau (BRA)	11

Round of 32
Stipe Jarloni (CRO)	10
Mahmood Haidari (AFG)	15
Philip Reyes (DEN)	1
Márcio Wenceslau (BRA)	12

Round of 16
Mahmood Haidari (AFG)	7
Márcio Wenceslau (BRA)	2
