= Taekwondo at the 2015 European Games – Men's 68 kg =

Taekwondo competition

Men's 68 kg at the 2015 European Games
- Venue: Crystal Hall complex
- Date: 17 June
- Competitors: 16 from 16 nations

Medalists
gold medal	Aykhan Taghizade	Azerbaijan
silver medal	Karol Robak	Poland
bronze medal	Joel González	Spain
bronze medal	Alexey Denisenko	Russia

Men's 68 kg competition in taekwondo at the 2015 European Games in Baku, Azerbaijan, took place on 15 June at Crystal Hall complex.

== Schedule ==
All times are Azerbaijan Summer Time (UTC+5).

Date	Time	Event
Tuesday, 17 June 2015	11:00	1/8 finals
Tuesday, 17 June 2015	13:00	Quarterfinals
Tuesday, 17 June 2015	13:00	Semifinals
Tuesday, 17 June 2015	15:00	Repechage
Tuesday, 17 June 2015	19:00	Finals

== Results ==
1/8 finals
Alexey Denisenko (RUS)	19
Michele Ceccaroni (SMR)	1
Martin Stamper (GBR)	18
Filip Grgić (CRO)	13
Joel González (ESP)	2
Vladimir Dalakliev (BUL)	1
Jure Pantar (SLO)	3
Aykhan Taghizade (AZE)	11
Servet Tazegül (TUR)	9
Karol Robak (POL)	21
Ioannis Pilavakis (CYP)	6
Mário Silva (POR)	12
Stevens Barclais (FRA)	4
Vladislav Arventii (MDA)	8
Claudio Treviso (ITA)	13
Jaouad Achab (BEL)	10

Quarterfinals
Alexey Denisenko (RUS)	18
Martin Stamper (GBR)	6
Joel González (ESP)	5
Aykhan Taghizade (AZE)	7
Karol Robak (POL)	10
Mário Silva (POR)	2
Vladislav Arventii (MDA)	11
Claudio Treviso (ITA)	9

Semifinals
Alexey Denisenko (RUS)	5
Aykhan Taghizade (AZE)	7
Karol Robak (POL)	13
Vladislav Arventii (MDA)	1

Final
Aykhan Taghizade (AZE)	10
Karol Robak (POL)	9

=== Repechage ===
Repechage round 1
Joel González (ESP)	11
Jure Pantar (SLO)	3
Servet Tazegül (TUR)	12
Mário Silva (POR)	6

Bronze medal match
Joel González (ESP)	7
Vladislav Arventii (MDA)	6
Servet Tazegül (TUR)	16
Alexey Denisenko (RUS)	19
