= Taekwondo at the 2013 Bolivarian Games =

Taekwondo competition

Taekwondo, for the 2013 Bolivarian Games, took place from 25 November to 28 November 2013.

== Medal table ==
Key:

* Host nation (Peru)

| Rank | Nation | Gold | Silver | Bronze | Total |
|---|---|---|---|---|---|
| 1 | Venezuela (VEN) | 5 | 2 | 3 | 10 |
| 2 | Colombia (COL) | 4 | 4 | 9 | 17 |
| 3 | Dominican Republic (DOM) | 4 | 3 | 4 | 11 |
| 4 | Peru (PER)* | 3 | 3 | 8 | 14 |
| 5 | Ecuador (ECU) | 2 | 3 | 3 | 8 |
| 6 | Guatemala (GUA) | 1 | 1 | 1 | 3 |
| 7 | Chile (CHI) | 0 | 3 | 2 | 5 |
| 8 | Panama (PAN) | 0 | 0 | 3 | 3 |
| 9 | Bolivia (BOL) | 0 | 0 | 1 | 1 |
| 9 | Paraguay (PAR) | 0 | 0 | 1 | 1 |
| Totals (10 entries) | | 19 | 19 | 35 | 73 |

== Medal summary ==
=== Men ===
| Event | Gold | Silver | Bronze |
|---|---|---|---|
| Finweight (~54 kg) | Harold Avella (COL) | Camilo Pérez (CHI) | Brayan Mercado (BOL) |
| Finweight (~54 kg) | Harold Avella (COL) | Camilo Pérez (CHI) | Edward Espinosa (DOM) |
| Flyweight (~58 kg) | Óscar Muñoz (COL) | Luisito Pie (DOM) | Ignacio Morales (CHI) |
| Flyweight (~58 kg) | Óscar Muñoz (COL) | Luisito Pie (DOM) | Matias Fernández (PAR) |
| Bantamweight (~63 kg) | Andres Rio (GUA) | Diego Camacho (ECU) | Edwin Aguilar (COL) |
| Bantamweight (~63 kg) | Andres Rio (GUA) | Diego Camacho (ECU) | Eric Guzmán (DOM) |
| Featherweight (~68 kg) | Edgar Contreras (VEN) | Ruddy Mateo (DOM) | Edgar Borja (ECU) |
| Featherweight (~68 kg) | Edgar Contreras (VEN) | Ruddy Mateo (DOM) | Peter López (PER) |
| Lightweight (~74 kg) | Wilkin Heredia (DOM) | Sergio García (ECU) | José Estupiñan (COL) |
| Lightweight (~74 kg) | Wilkin Heredia (DOM) | Sergio García (ECU) | Josue Chávezr (PER) |
| Welterweight (~80 kg) | Moisés Hernández (DOM) | Jeancarlo León (PER) | Jonathan Carcelen (ECU) |
| Welterweight (~80 kg) | Moisés Hernández (DOM) | Jeancarlo León (PER) | Carlos Vásquez (VEN) |
| Middleweight (~87 kg) | Carlos Rivas (VEN) | Angelo Ramos (CHI) | Moisés Molinares (COL) |
| Middleweight (~87 kg) | Carlos Rivas (VEN) | Angelo Ramos (CHI) | Derlyn Reyes (DOM) |
| Heavyweight (+87 kg) | Juan Díaz (VEN) | Ray Andrade (PER) | Carlos Cañas (COL) |
| Heavyweight (+87 kg) | Juan Díaz (VEN) | Ray Andrade (PER) | Luis Gudiño (PAN) |
| Poomsae individual | Henry Sigchos (ECU) (7.8) | Isaac Vélez (COL) (7.8) | Renzo Saux (PER) (7.7) |

=== Women ===
| Event | Gold | Silver | Bronze |
|---|---|---|---|
| Finweight (~46 kg) | Virginia Dellan (VEN) | Victoria Álvarez (CHI) | Miryam Soler (COL) |
| Finweight (~46 kg) | Virginia Dellan (VEN) | Victoria Álvarez (CHI) | Katherine Gina Calderón Flores (PER) |
| Flyweight (~49 kg) | Julissa Diez Canseco (PER) | Ibeth Rodríguez (COL) | Maria Sánchez (ECU) |
| Flyweight (~49 kg) | Julissa Diez Canseco (PER) | Ibeth Rodríguez (COL) | Elizabeth Zamora (GUA) |
| Bantamweight (~53 kg) | Disnansi Polanco (DOM) | Leandrys Quiñones (VEN) | Laura García (COL) |
| Bantamweight (~53 kg) | Disnansi Polanco (DOM) | Leandrys Quiñones (VEN) | Marlene Hernández (PAN) |
| Featherweight (~57 kg) | Elizabeth Alvarado (PER) | Coralia Abadia (GUA) | Doris Patiño (COL) |
| Featherweight (~57 kg) | Elizabeth Alvarado (PER) | Coralia Abadia (GUA) | Mary Pérez (PAN) |
| Lightweight (~62 kg) | Yudy Pérez (COL) | Adanys Cordero (VEN) | Yojaira Díaz (DOM) |
| Lightweight (~62 kg) | Yudy Pérez (COL) | Adanys Cordero (VEN) | Yosselyn García (PER) |
| Welterweight (~67 kg) | Katherine Dumar (COL) | Dayana Folleco (ECU) | Patricia Figueroa (CHI) |
| Welterweight (~67 kg) | Katherine Dumar (COL) | Dayana Folleco (ECU) | Tamara Freitez (VEN) |
| Middleweight (~73 kg) | Carolina del Valle (VEN) | Deysy Montes de Oca (DOM) | Sandra Vanegas (COL) |
| Middleweight (~73 kg) | Carolina del Valle (VEN) | Deysy Montes de Oca (DOM) | Brenda Velásquez (PER) |
| Heavyweight (+73 kg) | Katherine Rodríguez (DOM) | Jessica Bravo (COL) | Lastenia Cristobal (PER) |
| Heavyweight (+73 kg) | Katherine Rodríguez (DOM) | Jessica Bravo (COL) | Francis Jiménez (VEN) |
| Poomsae individual | Marcela Castillo (PER) (7.8) | Maria Suache (COL) (7.7) | Winnie Yi Wu Acuy (PER) (7.6) |

=== Mixed ===
| Event | Gold | Silver | Bronze |
|---|---|---|---|
| Poomsae doubles | Ecuador; Claudia Cardenas; Henry Sigchos | Peru; Marcela Castillo; Bruno Saux | Colombia; Olga Agudelo; Leandro Rodríguez |
