= Taekwondo at the 2016 Summer Olympics – Men's 68 kg =

Taekwondo competition

Men's 68 kg at the Games of the XXXI Olympiad
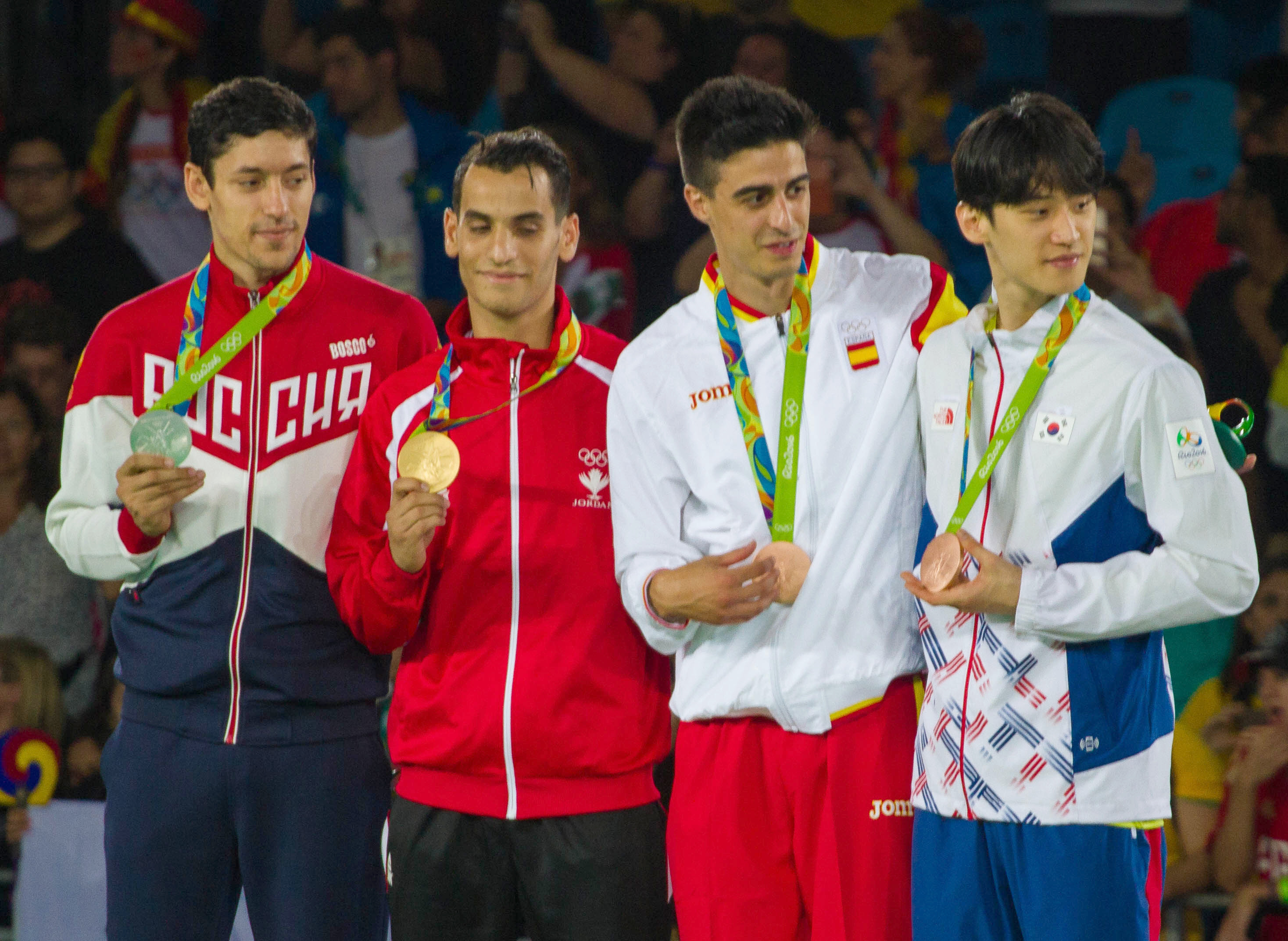
- Left-right: Denisenko, Abughaush, González, Lee
- Venue: Carioca Arena 3
- Date: 18 August 2016
- Competitors: 16 from 16 nations

Medalists
1st place, gold medalist(s)		Ahmad Abughaush	Jordan
2nd place, silver medalist(s)		Alexey Denisenko	Russia
3rd place, bronze medalist(s)		Joel González	Spain
3rd place, bronze medalist(s)		Lee Dae-hoon	South Korea

The men's 68 kg competition at the 2016 Summer Olympics was held on 18 August, at the Carioca Arena 3.

== Competition format ==
The main bracket consisted of a single elimination tournament, culminating in the gold medal match. The top eight athletes in each event were seeded so as not to face each other in the preliminary round. The remainder of the qualified athletes were drawn randomly on 15 August 2016. Two bronze medals were awarded at the Taekwondo competitions. A repechage was used to determine the bronze medal winners. Every competitor who lost to one of the two finalists competed in the repechage, another single-elimination competition. Each semifinal loser faced the last remaining repechage competitor from the opposite half of the bracket in a bronze medal match.

== Schedule ==
All times are in local time (UTC-3).

Date	Time	Round
Thursday, 18 August 2016	09:00; 15:00; 17:00; 20:00; 21:00; 22:00	Preliminary round Quarterfinals; Semifinals; Repechage; Bronze medal matches Final

== Seeds ==
Every practitioner was seeded at the event.

1. Jaouad Achab (BEL)
2. Lee Dae-hoon (KOR)
3. Saúl Gutiérrez (MEX)
4. Alexey Denisenko (RUS)
5. Servet Tazegül (TUR)
6. Joel González (ESP)
7. Ghofran Ahmed (EGY)
8. Karol Robak (POL)
9. Balla Dièye (SEN)
10. Ahmad Abughaush (JOR)
11. Filip Grgić (CRO)
12. Ignacio Morales (CHI)
13. Edgar Contreras (VEN)
14. Pürevjavyn Temüüjin (MGL)
15. David Boui (CAF)
16. Maxemillion Kassman (PNG)

== Results ==
=== Main bracket ===
Legend

- PTG – Won by points gap
- SUD – Won by sudden death (golden point)
- WD – Withdrew from contest

Preliminary round
13	Edgar Contreras (VEN)	2
4	Alexey Denisenko (RUS)	12
5	Servet Tazegül (TUR)	14 (PTG)
12	Ignacio Morales (CHI)	1
9	Balla Dièye (SEN)	12
8	Karol Robak (POL)	15
1	Jaouad Achab (BEL)	15 (PTG)
16	Maxemillion Kassman (PNG)	1
15	David Boui (CAF)	0 (WD)
2	Lee Dae-hoon (KOR)	6
7	Ghofran Zaki (EGY)	1
10	Ahmad Abughaush (JOR)	9
11	Filip Grgić (CRO)	3
6	Joel González (ESP)	4
3	Saúl Gutiérrez (MEX)	11
14	Pürevjavyn Temüüjin (MGL)	12

Quarterfinals
4	Alexey Denisenko (RUS)	19 (PTG)
5	Servet Tazegül (TUR)	6
8	Karol Robak (POL)	7
1	Jaouad Achab (BEL)	9
2	Lee Dae-hoon (KOR)	8
10	Ahmad Abughaush (JOR)	11
6	Joel González (ESP)	7
14	Pürevjavyn Temüüjin (MGL)	4

Semifinals
4	Alexey Denisenko (RUS)	6
1	Jaouad Achab (BEL)	1
10	Ahmad Abughaush (JOR)	12
6	Joel González (ESP)	7

Gold medal match
4	Alexey Denisenko (RUS)	6
10	Ahmad Abughaush (JOR)	10

=== Repechage ===
Repechage
Ghofran Zaki (EGY)	6
Lee Dae-hoon (KOR)	14
Servet Tazegül (TUR)	4
Edgar Contreras (VEN)	5 (SUD)

Bronze medal matches
Jaouad Achab (BEL)	7
Lee Dae-hoon (KOR)	11
Joel González (ESP)	4
Edgar Contreras (VEN)	3
