= Taekwondo at the 2015 Military World Games =

Taekwondo competition

- Dates: 8–10 October

The taekwondo competition at the 2015 Military World Games was held from 8–10 October 2015 at the KAFAC Indoor Sports Complex in Mungyeong.

== Medal summary ==
Results:

=== Men's events ===
Event	Gold	Silver	Bronze
Under 54 kg	Venilton Teixeira (BRA)	Mehdi Eshaghi (IRI)	Ali Almershad (KUW); Choi Yeong Sang (KOR)
Under 58 kg	Nursultan Mamayev (KAZ)	Hadi Tiran (IRI)	Luisito Pie (DOM); Levent Tuncat (GER)
Under 63 kg	Abolfazl Yaghoubi (IRI)	Guilherme Alves (BRA)	Jo Won Yong (KOR); Jure Pantar (SLO)
Under 68 kg	Hamza Adnan (GER)	Aykhan Taghizade (AZE)	Faisal Alrushaidi (QAT); Claudio Treviso (ITA)
Under 74 kg	Huang Jiannan (CHN)	Said Guliyev (AZE)	Nikita Kriveichenko (RUS); Mohammad Rafiei (IRI)
Under 80 kg	Oussama Queslati (TUN)	Saeid Rajabi (IRI)	Tahir Güleç (GER); Pan Long (CHN)
Under 87 kg	Mbar Ndiaye (FRA)	Alexander Bachmann (GER)	Aleksandr Lunevskii (RUS); Noureddine Ziani (MAR)
Over 87 kg	Sajjad Mardani (IRI)	Volker Wodzich (GER)	Radik Isayev (AZE); Moon Jeong Hoon (KOR)

=== Women's events ===
Event	Gold	Silver	Bronze
Under 46 kg	Iris Silva (BRA)	Nahid Kiani (IRI)	Choi Hee Jeong (KOR)
Under 49 kg	Patimat Abakarova (AZE)	Li Zhaoyi (CHN)	Ahmed Abdelsalam (EGY); Jamila Tanna (BRA)
Under 53 kg	Lucija Zaninović (CRO)	Floriane Liborio (FRA)	Angelica Bertucca (CAN); Fu Yu (CHN)
Under 57 kg	Zhang Mengyu (CHN)	Anna Froemming (GER)	Rafaela Vieira (BRA); Daria Zhuravleva (RUS)
Under 62 kg	Hedaya Wahba (EGY)	Zhang Hua (CHN)	Cristina Gaspa (ITA); Julia Vasconcelos (BRA)
Under 67 kg	Seham Elsawalhy (EGY)	Guo Yunfei (CHN)	Hanieh Akhlaghi (IRI); Hakima El Meslahy (MAR)
Under 73 kg	Zheng Shuyin (CHN)	Anastasiia Gurskaia (RUS)	Fatemeh Rouhani (IRI)
Over 73 kg	Li Donghua (CHN)	Gwladys Épangue (FRA)	Nuša Rajher (SLO); Katharina Weiss (GER)
