= Luisito Pié =

Dominican taekwondo athlete

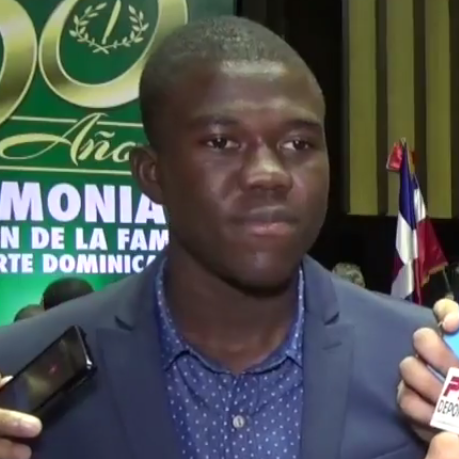
- Pié in 2016

Personal information
- Nationality: Dominican
- Born: Luisito Pie; March 4, 1994 (age 32) Bayaguana, Monte Plata, Dominican Republic
- Height: 1.83 m (6 ft 0 in)
- Weight: 57 kg (126 lb)

Sport
- Sport: Taekwondo
- Event: –58 kg
- College team: Universidad Nacional Evangélica
- Coached by: Miguel Camacho

Achievements and titles
- Olympic finals: 2016 Summer Olympics: –58 kg Bronze
Medal record
Men's taekwondo
Representing Dominican Republic
Olympic Games
Bronze medal – third place	2016 Rio de Janeiro	58 kg
Military World Games
Bronze medal – third place	2015 Mungyeong	58 kg
Pan American Games
Silver medal – second place	2015 Toronto	58 kg
Pan American Championship
Gold medal – first place	2014 Aguascalientes	58 kg
Central American and Caribbean Games
Gold medal – first place	2014 Veracruz	Flyweight
Bolivarian Games
Silver medal – second place	2013 Trujillo	58 kg

Luisito Pié (Spanish pronunciation: [lwiˈsito ˈpje], born March 4, 1994), also known as Luis Pie ([ˈlwis ˈpje]), is a Haitian-Dominican taekwondo athlete who won the bronze medal in the 2016 Summer Olympics in the 58 kg category.

Pie won the gold medal in the 2014 Central American and Caribbean Games and silver in the 2013 Bolivarian Games, 2015 Pan American Games and bronze medalist in the 2015 Military World Games. He belongs to the Dominican Olympic program CRESO.

== Personal life ==
Pie is 183 cm (6 ft 0 in) tall 57 kilograms (126 lb), born on March 4, 1986, in Bayaguana, Monte Plata. He is the older son of José Beltrán, a Haitian, and Marisol Pié Desquile, who was born in the Dominican Republic to Haitian parents. Pié's father, an agricultural labourer in the Dominican Republic, lacked care for him and did not give him his surname. He was raised by his Dominican step-father Euclides Reyes and his mother.

He went to the Morayma Veloz de Báez High school and as of 2016, studies Physical education at Instituto Superior de Formación Docente Salomé Ureña in 2015, before switching to Universidad Nacional Evangélica in 2016. Pie joined the Centro de Iniciación Deportiva Escolar (CIDE) led by Isaac Ogando, where he were signed after his participation in the 2012 National Elementary School Games, practicing track and field with the coach Francisca Tiburcio when he was ten but later the coach Héctor Rodríguez helped him to switch to Taekwondo one year later. He is a member of the Dominican Navy since 2011 with the lowest rank.

His brother Bernardo, is also a professional Taekwondo fighter, who competed together in the 2014 Central American and Caribbean Games.

=== Nationality controversy ===
Following his achievement of a Central American and Caribbean Games gold medal in Veracruz 2014, his Haitian origin sparked some discussion. His mother, Marisol Pie Desquile, appeared in TV news expressing her excitement for his son's victory, speaking with a heavy Haitian accent, which made many people doubt the Dominicanness of Pie.

Two years later, after he won an Olympic bronze medal in Rio 2016, a controversy burst about Pie's nationality, especially in social media.

On 19 August 2016 the Junta Central Electoral (Spanish for 'Central Electoral Board'), issued a press release congratulating Luisito Pie's for his Olympic medal and stating that Marisol Pie's father had a cédula, meaning that he was legal, and denied that she —and thereby her children— had any problem with Constitutional Court ruling #168-13.

Nevertheless, she appears indeed in the JCE official list of people that were unlawfully registered in the Dominican Civil Registry. Hence, Marisol and Luisito Pie were benefited of the special Dominican law for said people, law 169-14.

== Career ==
=== 2013 ===
Pie won the 2013 Bolivarian Games silver medal in the 58 kg category after 16-17 falling to the Colombia Luis Muñoz in the final contest. He later blame the lack of experience the reason of his loss.

=== 2014 ===
Pie fought against the Olympic medalist Gabriel Mercedes and César Martínez for the 58 kg category spot in the national team, both Martínez and Pie eliminating Mercedes in the process, and Martinez defeating Pie in the final contest. Pie later was changed to the 63 kg cat for the Central American and Caribbean Games qualifier, while Martínez defended the 58 category. While training for the Central American Caribbean Games with his coach Héctor Rodríguez, he expressed that his dream was climb through the regional games then compete in the 2016 Summer Olympics, dream that he wanted to achieve with strong dedication, even though he had only been a member of the national team for one year. He thanked his teammates and coaches when he won the gold medal in the qualifier mixing different technics in front of every fighter of the 63 kg category. He defeated 10–0 to Rafael Mota Jr from Puerto Rico in the preliminary round, he then win 20–0 over Guayanese Jibreel Malik and 11–6 to the Cuban Ernesto Molina in the semifinals before defeating Venezuelan Gustavo Machado. Soon after that, Pie won the gold medal in the Santo Domingo Open, when he defeated the Mexican Abel Mendoza helping the Dominican Republic to reach the second place in the event. He later won the 58 kg category gold medal of the Pan American Championship held in Aguascalientes, Mexico, winning over the Argentinian Lucas Guzman in the championship contest.

After this series of victories, Pie was said to be one of the main figures and biggest medal hopes for his home country by the Dominican Republic Taekwondo Federation president, Francisco Camacho. He won the 58 kg Central American and Caribbean Games gold medal recovering from a last minute tie kick from silver medalist the Venezuela Mario Leal. He considered this medal a step towards his Olympic medal dream and said that he only worked for the gold medal and would not settled with anything else, while considering that hard and teamwork were the secret for this success.

=== 2015 ===
The Dominican Republic Olympic Committee awarded Pie as 2014 Taekwondo Athlete of Year while being defined as one of the new talents of the Dominican Republic sport and the heir of the dynasty of national taekwondo. Pie was also awarded Most Valuable Fighter from the National University Taekwondo tournament held in April, when he won the gold medal by winning by superiority -margins of more than 12 points- all his combats, helping Instituto Superior de Formación Docente Salomé Ureña to reach the tournament's second place. He later went to the 2014–15 University Sports Gala with fellow athletes and his university sport director to pick up the top award for the second year in a row.

The president of the Dominican Republic University Sports Commission, Vice Minister Marcos Díaz regretted that the Pan American Games were taking place at the same time of the 2015 Summer Universiade, because the nation had to prioritize the first ones, not being able to count with Pie representing his home country. He then participated in the qualification tournament in Aguascalientes, Mexico, winning the berth for the 2015 Pan American Games. He was focus to give his home country and for himself a medal. And he started winning 8–6 to the Argentinian Lucas Guzmán, 13–14 to the Venezuelan Mario Leal in the quarterfinals and 3–4 in the semifinals to the Aruban veteran John Maduro before he lost by sudden death point to the Mexican Carlos Navarro 7–8, winning the 58 kg Pan American Games silver medal. He later confessed that lack of international warm ups before the games affected his level of fighting, because of the quality of rivals that he had to face in the preliminary rounds.

After the regional games, Pie was invited for his ranking points, to take part in the WTF World Grand Prix Series held in Moscow, falling to the Portuguese Rui Bragança in the first contest 5–6 in the 58 kg Pie lost 11-13 once again to the Mexican Navarro in the Pan American Open WTF G1 in Aguascalientes, winning again the silver medal. and later in Samnsun, Turkey falling 4–5 in golden point to Nursultan Mamayev in the first round.

He was selected to participate in the Military World Games along with Moisés Hernández and he won the 58 kg bronze medal. In the Dominican Republic Hall of Fame 2015 Ceremony, Pie was invited to carry one of the hall symbols, the Machete during the induction ceremony. His 2015 competition year ended by winning to the Tunisian Hedi Nefatti the Morocco Open G1 gold medal.

=== 2016 ===
In February he won the 63 kg category bronze medal in the U.S. Open held in Reno, Nevada. He won the qualifier tournament 58 kg gold medal and qualified for the 2016 Summer Olympics and for the first time his country would have more than one representative, when two other fellow competitors also qualified. He considered this qualification revealed the country's new level as they test themselves at that high standard, they would fight for medals no matter what kind. After the qualifier, he won the 63 kg bronze medal in the Mexico Open, held in the same venue.

The Guild of Sports Writers gave Pie the 2015 Taekwondo Athlete of the year award in its April Gala. Pie traveled to Benicàssim, Spain, there he won the 58 kg silver medal after losing 6–7 to the Mexican Carlos Navarro in the 14th Spanish Open and two weeks later, the Hamburg German Open 58 kg bronze medal. With the results from Spain and Germany, he was focus in his preparation for the Olympics and confessed that he felt not pressure but commitment to a medal result. He did not travel to the Pan American Championship to take time to treat an injury.

With the guidance of his coach Miguel Camacho, he said that he felt himself in good shape and ready to face any of the best competitors. He advanced to the Olympic tournament quarterfinal round after his first opponent, the German Levent Tuncat was injured in training and unable to compete; Pie said that he was ready to pursuit his Olympic glory after the training base they spent in San Luis Potosí, Mexico. He defeated 4–1 to the Portuguese Rui Bragança in the quarterfinals and lost 7–11 to Tawin Hanprab from Thailand in the semifinal round but recovered to win 6–5 by sudden death to the Spanish Jesús Tortosa to win the bronze medal, that was the country's only medal in the games.

After he returned to his homeland, he proclaimed that he fought for all the 10 million of Dominicans, at the time he was welcome by the President of the Dominican Republic Olympic Committee and the Minister of Sports Danilo Díaz, who revealed that Pie would be awarded with an apartment and an amount in cash that will be revealed in private. He received congratulatory letter from the Dominican president Danilo Medina, hoping that Pie keeps behaving himself as an example for the youth. The Universidad Nacional Evangélica took advantage of the 2015-16 University sport top award celebration to give Pie a recognition for his Olympic success.
