= Aykhan =

Aykhan is a given name. Notable people with the name include:

- Aykhan Abbasov (born 1981), Azerbaijani footballer and manager
- Aykhan Guseynov (born 1999), Russian footballer
- Aykhan Taghizade (born 1996), Azerbaijani taekwondo practitioner
