= Taekwondo at the 2012 Summer Olympics – Men's 58 kg =

Taekwondo competition

Men's 58kg at the Games of the XXX Olympiad
- Venue: ExCeL Exhibition Centre
- Date: 8 August
- Competitors: 16 from 16 nations

Medalists
1st place, gold medalist(s)		Joel González	Spain
2nd place, silver medalist(s)		Lee Dae-Hoon	South Korea
3rd place, bronze medalist(s)		Óscar Muñoz	Colombia
3rd place, bronze medalist(s)		Aleksey Denisenko	Russia

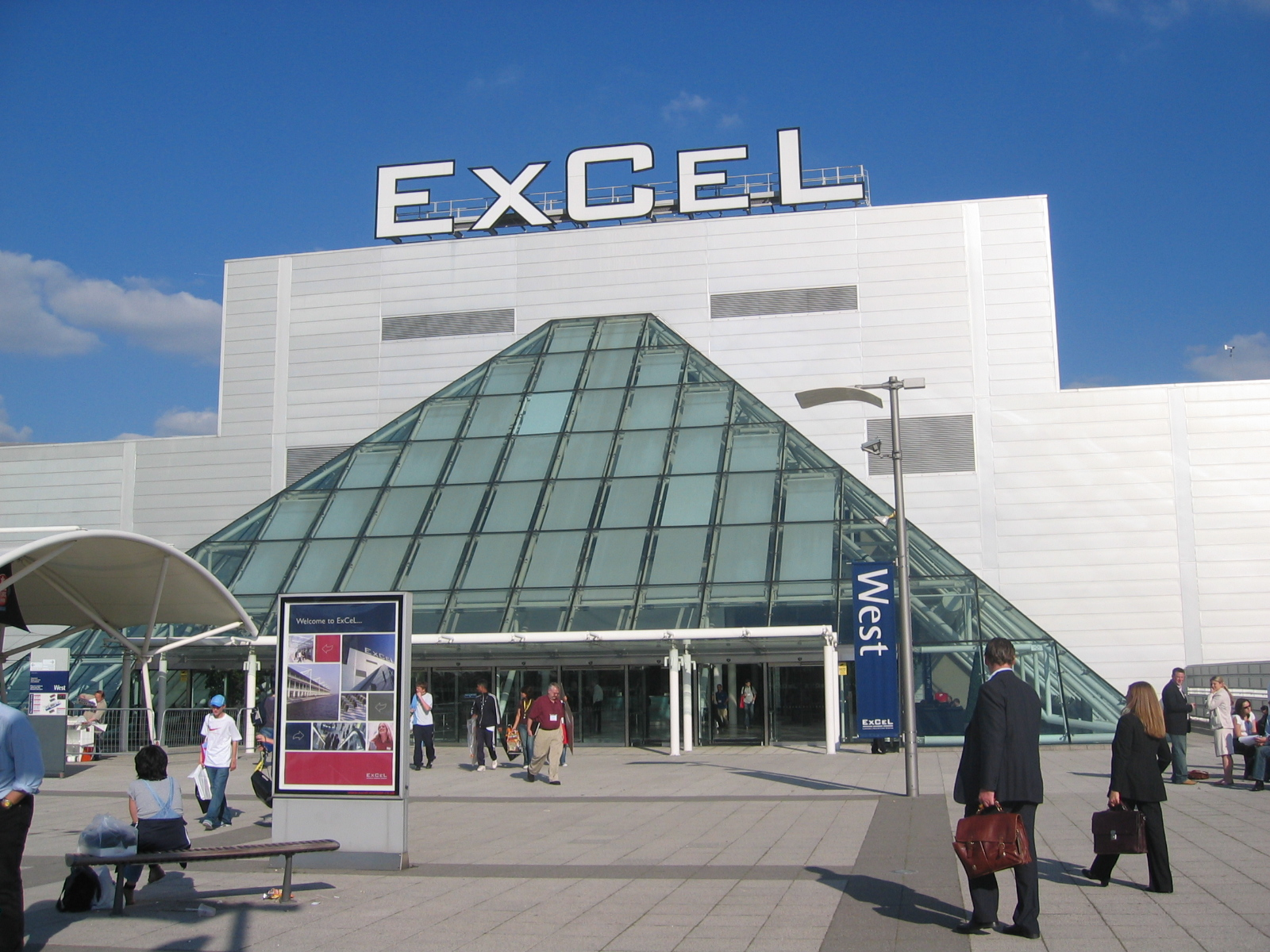
ExCeL Exhibition Centre in 2005

The men's 58 kg competition at the 2012 Summer Olympics was held on 8 August, at the ExCeL Exhibition Centre.

== Competition format ==
The main bracket consisted of a single elimination tournament, culminating in the gold medal match. Two bronze medals were awarded at the Taekwondo competitions. A repechage was used to determine the bronze medal winners. Every competitor who lost to one of the two finalists competed in the repechage, another single-elimination competition. Each semifinal loser faced the last remaining repechage competitor from the opposite half of the bracket in a bronze medal match.

== Schedule ==
All times are British Summer Time (UTC+1)

Date	Time	Round
Wednesday, 8 August 2012	09:15; 15:15; 17:17; 22:30	Preliminary Round; Quarterfinals; Semifinals; Final

== Results ==
On 13 July 2012 the World Taekwondo Federation released the provisional draw which included the top eight seeds for the competition. The remainder of the qualified athletes were randomly drawn on 6 August 2012.

=== Main Bracket ===
Legend

- SUD - Win by sudden death point.
- PTG - Win by point gap. This happens when a competitor has a 12-point lead at the end of the second round or achieves a 12-point lead at any point in the 3rd round.

Preliminary round
1	Joel González (ESP)	7
14	Uno Sanli (SWE)	6
13	Diego García (MEX)	4
8	Safwan Khalil (AUS)	9
5	Mokdad El-Yamine (ALG)	1
9	Óscar Muñoz (COL)	8
16	Tameem Al-Kubati (YEM)	8
4	Gabriel Mercedes (DOM)	3
3	Pen-Ek Karaket (THA)	7
12	Lee Dae-Hoon (KOR)	8 (SUD)
11	Nursultan Mamayev (KAZ)	0
6	Tamer Bayoumi (EGY)	1 (SUD)
7	Aleksey Denisenko (RUS)	5
10	Heiner Oviedo (CRC)	2
15	Le Huynh Chau (VIE)	1
2	Wei Chen-Yang (TPE)	5

Quarterfinals
1	Joel González (ESP)	5
8	Safwan Khalil (AUS)	3
9	Óscar Muñoz (COL)	14 (PTG)
16	Tameem Al-Kubati (YEM)	2
12	Lee Dae-Hoon (KOR)	11 (SUD)
6	Tamer Bayoumi (EGY)	10
7	Aleksey Denisenko (RUS)	10 (SUD)
2	Wei Chen-Yang (TPE)	7

Semifinals
1	Joel González (ESP)	13
9	Óscar Muñoz (COL)	4
12	Lee Dae-Hoon (KOR)	7
7	Aleksey Denisenko (RUS)	6

Gold medal match
1	Joel González (ESP)	17
12	Lee Dae-Hoon (KOR)	8

=== Repechage ===
Every competitor who lost to one of the two finalists competed in the repechage, another single-elimination competition. Each semifinal loser faced the last remaining repechage competitor from the opposite half of the bracket in a bronze medal match.

Round 1
