= Diego García (taekwondo) =

Mexican taekwondo practitioner

Diego García de Leon (born 2 February 1990 in Mexico City) is a Mexican taekwondo practitioner. He competed in the 58 kg event at the 2012 Summer Olympics he was eliminated in the preliminary round by Safwan Khalil. He gave Mexico its second medal at the World University Taekwondo Championships, held in Hohhot, China, by winning bronze in the -58 kilogram category. In 2012, he also won silver medal during US Open held in Las Vegas.
