= Taekwondo at the 2014 Asian Games – Men's 58 kg =

Taekwondo competition

Men's 58 kg at the 2014 Asian Games
- Venue: Ganghwa Dolmens Gymnasium
- Date: 3 October 2014
- Competitors: 23 from 23 nations

Medalists
gold medal	Farzan Ashourzadeh	Iran
silver medal	Nursultan Mamayev	Kazakhstan
bronze medal	Yuma Yamada	Japan
bronze medal	Wei Chen-yang	Chinese Taipei

The men's flyweight (58 kilograms) event at the 2014 Asian Games took place on 3 October 2014 at Ganghwa Dolmens Gymnasium, Incheon, South Korea.

== Schedule ==
All times are Korea Standard Time (UTC+09:00)

Date	Time	Event
Friday, 3 October 2014	09:30	Round of 32
Friday, 3 October 2014	09:30	Round of 16
Friday, 3 October 2014	15:30	Quarterfinals
Friday, 3 October 2014	15:30	Semifinals
Friday, 3 October 2014	18:00	Final

== Results ==
Legend

- W — Won by withdrawal

=== Final ===
Final
Nursultan Mamayev (KAZ)	4
Farzan Ashourzadeh (IRI)	7

=== Top half ===
Round of 32
Sonexay Mangkheua (LAO)	1
Yuma Yamada (JPN)	10
Ng Chi Hou (MAC)	0
Nguyễn Văn Duy (VIE)	12
Hussain Al-Maazmi (UAE)	6
Ong Stevanus (INA)	15

Round of 16
Berdi Berdiýew (TKM)	5
Yuma Yamada (JPN)	19
Jin Agojo (PHI)	14
Naing Dwe Shein (MYA)	1
Nursultan Mamayev (KAZ)	21
Nguyễn Văn Duy (VIE)	8
Ong Stevanus (INA)	7
Kinley Penjor (BHU)	2

Quarterfinals
Yuma Yamada (JPN)	18
Jin Agojo (PHI)	16
Nursultan Mamayev (KAZ)	10
Ong Stevanus (INA)	4

Semifinals
Yuma Yamada (JPN)	1
Nursultan Mamayev (KAZ)	7

=== Bottom half ===
Round of 32
Mesfer Al-Ajmi (KUW)	8
Ranjan Shrestha (NEP)	7
Almaz Toktomatov (KGZ)	0
Wei Chen-yang (TPE)	9^{W}
Farzan Ashourzadeh (IRI)	9
Mohammad Khalifah (JOR)	2
Achitkhüügiin Natsagdorj (MGL)	0
Zhao Shuai (CHN)	13

Round of 16
Mahmood Haidari (AFG)	13
Mesfer Al-Ajmi (KUW)	6
Wei Chen-yang (TPE)	20
Jwalanta Chakma (BAN)	2
Pen-ek Karaket (THA)	2
Farzan Ashourzadeh (IRI)	11
Zhao Shuai (CHN)	17
Mubarak Al-Shareef (KSA)	2

Quarterfinals
Mahmood Haidari (AFG)	7
Wei Chen-yang (TPE)	12
Farzan Ashourzadeh (IRI)	11
Zhao Shuai (CHN)	10

Semifinals
Wei Chen-yang (TPE)	6
Farzan Ashourzadeh (IRI)	13
