= Taekwondo at the 2019 Pan American Games – Women's 67 kg =

Taekwondo – Women's 67 kg at the 2019 Pan American Games
- Venue: Polideportivo Callao
- Dates: July 29
- Competitors: 13 from 13 nations

Medalists
Gold medal	Milena Titoneli	Brazil
Silver medal	Paige McPherson	United States
Bronze medal	Katherine Dumar	Colombia
Bronze medal	Arlettys Acosta	Cuba

The women's 67 kg competition of the taekwondo events at the 2019 Pan American Games took place on July 29 at the Polideportivo Callao.

== Results ==
=== Main bracket ===
The final results were:

Preliminary round
Alexis Arnoldt (ARG)	9
Claudia Gallardo (CHI)	7
Ashley Kraayeveld (CAN)	16
Yosselyn Molina (HON)	4
Madelyn Rodríguez (DOM)	22
Diana Chirinos (PER)	2
Arlettys Acosta (CUB)	0
Katherine Alvarado (CRC)	0
Katherine Dumar (COL)	8
Adanys Cordero (VEN)	0

Quarterfinals
Paige McPherson (USA)	26
Alexis Arnoldt (ARG)	7
Ashley Kraayeveld (CAN)	12
Madelyn Rodríguez (DOM)	7
Victoria Heredia (MEX)	1
Arlettys Acosta (CUB)	5
Katherine Dumar (COL)	8
Milena Titoneli (BRA)	9

Semifinals
Paige McPherson (USA)	11
Ashley Kraayeveld (CAN)	9
Arlettys Acosta (CUB)	5
Milena Titoneli (BRA)	10

Gold medal match
Paige McPherson (USA)	8
Milena Titoneli (BRA)	9

=== Repechage ===
Bronze medal match
Ashley Kraayeveld (CAN)	4
Katherine Dumar (COL)	13

Bronze medal match
Alexis Arnoldt (ARG)	7
Arlettys Acosta (CUB)	10
