= Taekwondo at the 2014 Central American and Caribbean Games =

Taekwondo competition

- Venue: World Trade Center Veracruz
- Location: Veracruz, Mexico
- Dates: 15-20 November

The taekwondo competition at the 2014 Central American and Caribbean Games was held in Veracruz, Mexico.

The tournament was scheduled to be held from 15–18 November at the World Trade Center Veracruz.

== Medal summary ==
=== Men's events ===
| Event | Gold | Silver | Bronze |
|---|---|---|---|
| Under 54 kg | César Rodríguez (MEX) | Cleiver Olaizola (VEN) | Gabriel Villacorta (ESA); Joan Nunez (PUR) |
| Under 58 kg | Luisito Pié (DOM) | Mario Leal (VEN) | Damian Villa (MEX); Osvaldo Llorens (CUB) |
| Under 63 kg | Saúl Gutiérrez (MEX) | Bernardo Pié (DOM) | Óscar Muñoz (COL); Julio Flores (GUA) |
| Under 68 kg | Ruddy Mateo (DOM) | Isaac Torres (MEX) | Dorian Alexander (TRI); Tosh van Dijk (SUR) |
| Under 74 kg | José Cobas (CUB) | Guillermo Rodas (GUA) | Uriel Adriano (MEX); Elvis Barbosa (PUR) |
| Under 80 kg | Rene Lizarraga (MEX) | Miguel Ferrera (HON) | Moisés Hernández (DOM); Yair Medina (COL) |
| Under 87 kg | Rafael Alba (CUB) | Craig Brown (JAM) | Misael López (MEX); Moisés Molinares (COL) |
| Over 87 kg | Robelis Despaigne (CUB) | Kristopher Moitland (CRC) | Victor Ballesteros (MEX); Víctor Feliz (DOM) |

=== Women's events ===
| Event | Gold | Silver | Bronze |
|---|---|---|---|
| Under 46 kg | Ana Olivan (MEX) | Luz Cardenas (COL) | Virginia Dellan (VEN); Yosmailys Ferrer (CUB) |
| Under 49 kg | Itzel Manjarrez (MEX) | Victoria Stambaugh (PUR) | Ibeth Rodríguez (COL); Elizabeth Zamora (GUA) |
| Under 53 kg | Diana Lara (MEX) | Yamicel Núñez (CUB) | Laura García (COL); Carolena Carsten (PAN) |
| Under 57 kg | Adriana Martinez (VEN) | Yislena Lastre (CUB) | Amanda Sanchez (CRC); Coralia Abadia (GUA) |
| Under 62 kg | Anel Félix (MEX) | Yudy Perez (COL) | Adanys Cordero (VEN); Aniat Oquendo (PUR) |
| Under 67 kg | Victoria Heredia (MEX) | Deysy Montes de Oca (DOM) | Katherine Dumar (COL); Katherine Alvarado (CRC) |
| Under 73 kg | María Espinoza (MEX) | Glenhis Hernández (CUB) | Sandra Vanegas (COL); Yosselín Molina (HON) |
| Over 73 kg | Briseida Acosta (MEX) | Lisbeilys Ferran (CUB) | Keyla Avila (HON); Jessica Bravo (COL) |

== Medal table ==
* Host nation (Mexico)

| Rank | Nation | Gold | Silver | Bronze | Total |
|---|---|---|---|---|---|
| 1 | Mexico (MEX)* | 10 | 1 | 4 | 15 |
| 2 | Cuba (CUB) | 3 | 4 | 2 | 9 |
| 3 | Dominican Republic (DOM) | 2 | 2 | 2 | 6 |
| 4 | Venezuela (VEN) | 1 | 2 | 2 | 5 |
| 5 | Colombia (COL) | 0 | 2 | 8 | 10 |
| 6 | Guatemala (GUA) | 0 | 1 | 3 | 4 |
| 6 | Puerto Rico (PUR) | 0 | 1 | 3 | 4 |
| 8 | Costa Rica (CRC) | 0 | 1 | 2 | 3 |
| 8 | Honduras (HON) | 0 | 1 | 2 | 3 |
| 10 | Jamaica (JAM) | 0 | 1 | 0 | 1 |
| 11 | El Salvador (ESA) | 0 | 0 | 1 | 1 |
| 11 | Panama (PAN) | 0 | 0 | 1 | 1 |
| 11 | Suriname (SUR) | 0 | 0 | 1 | 1 |
| 11 | Trinidad and Tobago (TRI) | 0 | 0 | 1 | 1 |
| Totals (14 entries) | | 16 | 16 | 32 | 64 |
