= Karol Robak =

Polish taekwondo practitioner

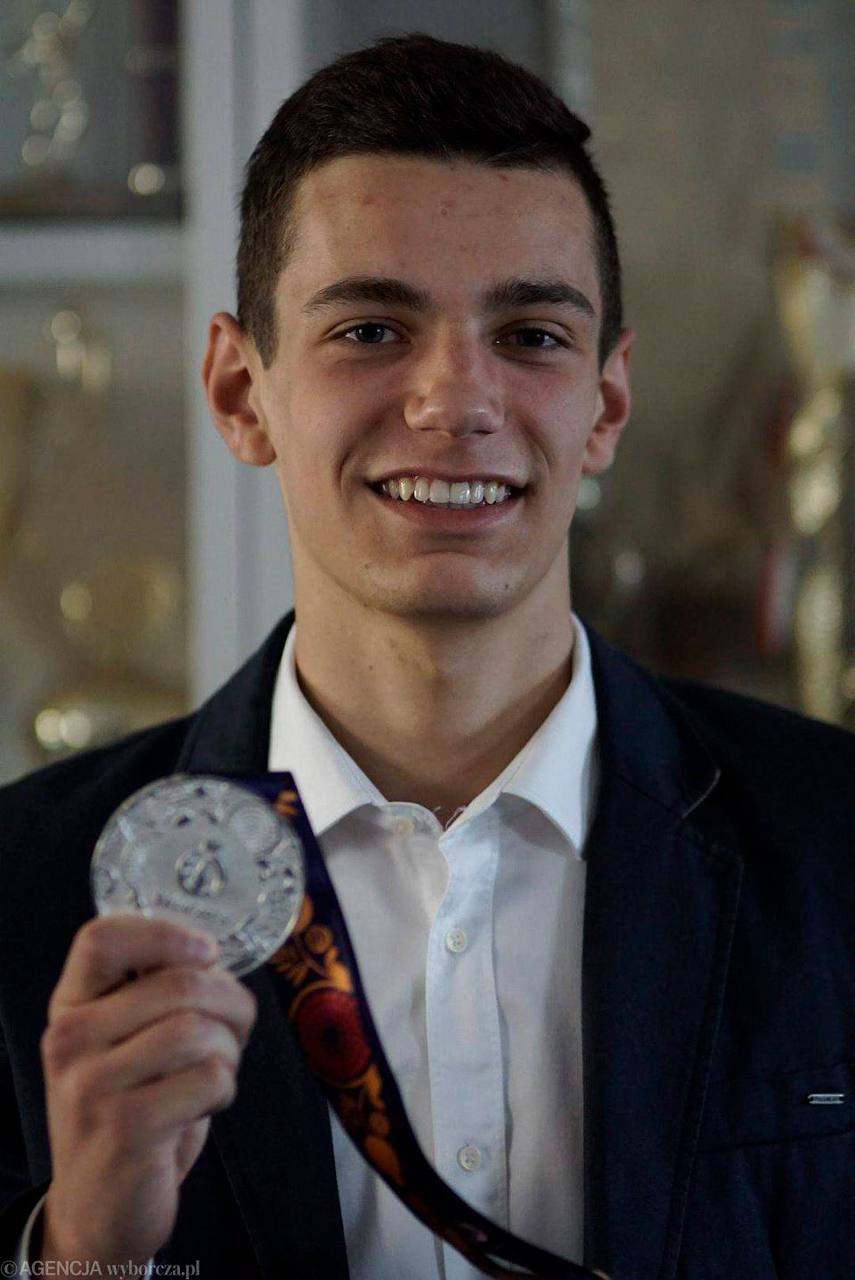

Personal information
- Nationality: Polish
- Born: 24 August 1997 (age 28) Poznań

Sport
- Sport: Taekwondo
Medal record
Men's taekwondo
Representing Poland
European Games
| Silver medal – second place | 2015 Baku | 68 kg |

Karol Robak (born 24 August 1997, Poznań) is a Polish taekwondo athlete.

He competed at the 2016 Summer Olympics in Rio de Janeiro, in the men's 68 kg.
