= Wei Chen-yang =

Taiwanese taekwondo practitioner (born 1992)

Medal record

Men's taekwondo

Representing Chinese Taipei

World Championships
Bronze medal – third place	2011 Gyeongju	Flyweight
Bronze medal – third place	2013 Puebla	Bantamweight

Grand Prix
Gold medal – first place	2013 Manchester	58 kg

Asian Games
Gold medal – first place	2010 Guangzhou	Flyweight
Bronze medal – third place	2014 Incheon	58 kg

Asian Championships
Silver medal – second place	2010 Astana	Flyweight

Wei Chen-yang (Chinese: 魏辰洋; pinyin: Wèi Chényáng; born 23 February 1992 in Nantou County) is a Taiwanese retired taekwondo practitioner. He competed in the 58 kg event at the 2012 Summer Olympics; he defeated Le Huynh Chau in the preliminary round and was eliminated by Alexey Denisenko in the quarterfinal. Wei retired from taekwondo in 2014.
