= Saúl Gutiérrez =

Mexican taekwondo practitioner

Personal information
- Full name: Saúl Gutiérrez Macedo
- Born: 28 December 1992 (age 33) Lázaro Cárdenas, Michoacán, Mexico
- Height: 1.92 m (6 ft 4 in)
Medal record
Men's taekwondo
Representing Mexico
World Championships
Bronze medal – third place	2015 Chelyabinsk	Bantamweight
Pan American Games
Gold medal – first place	2015 Toronto	68 kg
Central American and Caribbean Games
Gold medal – first place	2014 Veracruz	Bantamweight
- Updated on 29 July 2015

Saúl Gutiérrez Macedo (born 28 December 1992) is a Mexican taekwondo practitioner.

Gutiérrez first garnered attention in September 2014 when he won the gold medal in the bantamweight division (under 63 kg) at the Pan American Championships held in Aguascalientes, Mexico. In November 2014, Gutiérrez won another bantamweight gold at the Central American and Caribbean Games held in Veracruz, Mexico.

Gutiérrez competed in his first World Championship in 2015, where he won bronze by losing to two-time world champion Joel González of Spain 6:5 in the semifinals.

He competed at the 2016 Summer Olympics and failed to make it past the first round by losing to a competitor from Mongolia.
