= Creando Sueños Olímpicos =

CRESO
- Founded: 2011
- Founder: Felipe Vicini
- Type: Nonprofit organization
- Purpose: Developing top tier athletes in Dominican Olympic sports, with equal focus on academics and leadership
- Location: Santo Domingo, Dominican Republic
- Website: cresord.org

Creando Sueños Olímpicos, known by the initials CRESO, is a nonprofit organization which invests in the development of top-tier Dominican athletes in Olympic sports, along with an academic formation.

== History ==
CRESO was the initiative of Mr. Felipe Vicini, Managing Partner of the asset management firm INICIA (previously known as VICINI). Mr. Vicini had read a report by Chris Dillow from the London Times newspaper after the Beijing Olympics that praised the Dominican Republic’s performance in the Beijing Games — the number of medals obtained contrasted with the amount of resources the Dominican Republic receives and the number of athletes sent to Beijing. According to World Bank data, Dominican Republic occupies the 179th place among the countries with higher per capita income, but occupied the 47th spot in medals won during the Beijing Olympics. Felipe Vicini encountered the President of the Dominican Olympic Committee, Luis Mejia, on a flight from Santo Domingo to New York, which led to the first meeting between interested partners.

Eight companies initially joined to make up CRESO and sponsor ten sports disciplines: INICIA, Corripio Group, Dominican Popular Bank, Claro, Central Romana Corporation, SID Group, Rica Group and Ferquido. CRESO plans are based on a four-year process, which begins with the National Games, then the Central American and Pan-American games, and ends with the Olympic Games. CRESO also focuses on the academic preparation of the athletes, many of which receive scholarships to the universities of their choice, local as well as international institutions. CRESO chairman, Felipe Vicini, explains that “the program promotes sports, educational and social development, so that long-term we can create model leaders and citizens, committed to their country. We want every athlete to compete and study a career, so that when their sportsmanship years end, they can continue working, as productive members of society in the national labor market”.

== Sports ==
To date, CRESO supports athletes in 17 different Olympic sports. These are Athletics, Basketball, Boxing, Equestrian, Fencing, Golf, Gymnastics, Judo, Karate, Swimming, Sailing, Skateboarding, Swimming, Table Tennis, Taekwondo, Tennis, Weightlifting and Wrestling.

== Athletes ==
The program invests in more than 90 athletes, some of which have won Olympic and/or Pan-American Medals. For example, Luguelín Santos in Athletics, Yvonne Losos in Equestrian, Luisito Pie in Taekwondo, Víctor Estrella Burgos in Tennis, Beatriz Pirón and Yudelkis Contreras in Weightlifting, among others. In the past, Olympic medalists Gabriel Mercedes and Félix Sánchez were athletes supported by CRESO, and now they serve as role models and motivational speakers for other athletes. They both have university degrees and work in the development of new athletes in their respective sports areas.

== Results ==
2013 Bolivarian Games : CRESO Athletes won 38 of the 78 medals that ware won by Dominican Republic in this competition

2014 Central American and Caribbean Games: CRESO Athletes won 47 of the 77 medals that ware won by Dominican Republic in this competition

2015 Pan American Games: CRESO Athletes won 20 of the 24 medals that ware won by Dominican Republic in this competition

2016 Summer Olympics: CRESO Athlete Luisito Pié won the only medal of Dominican Republic in this competition.

2017 Summer Universiade: All 6 medals won by Dominican Republic in this competition came from athletes of CRESO.

2017 Bolivarian Games: CRESO Athletes won 45 of the 68 medals that ware won by Dominican Republic in this competition

== Current Partners (Sponsors) ==
Central Romana Corporation, CLARO, Ferquido, Grupo Rica, SID Group, Total Dominicana, Banco Popular Dominicano, Universal Group, and INICIA.

== Board of directors ==
Board of Directors:

- Felipe Vicini – INICIA, Ltd.
- Eduardo Najri – Fertilizantes Químicos Dominicanos, S.A. (FERQUIDO)
- Manuel Alejandro Grullón – Banco Popular Dominicano, S.A.
- Oscar Peña – Claro/Compañía Dominicana de Teléfonos, S.A.
- Julio V. Brache – Rica Group
- Roberto Bonetti – Grupo SID, S.A.
- Ramon Menendez – Central Romana Corporation, Ltd.
- Demetrio Almonte – Total Dominicana, S.A.
- Ernesto Izquierdo – Grupo Universal, S.A.
- Samir Rizek – Rizek Cacao.
- Luís Mejía Oviedo – Dominican Olympic Committee
