= Iris Sing =

Brazilian taekwondo practitioner

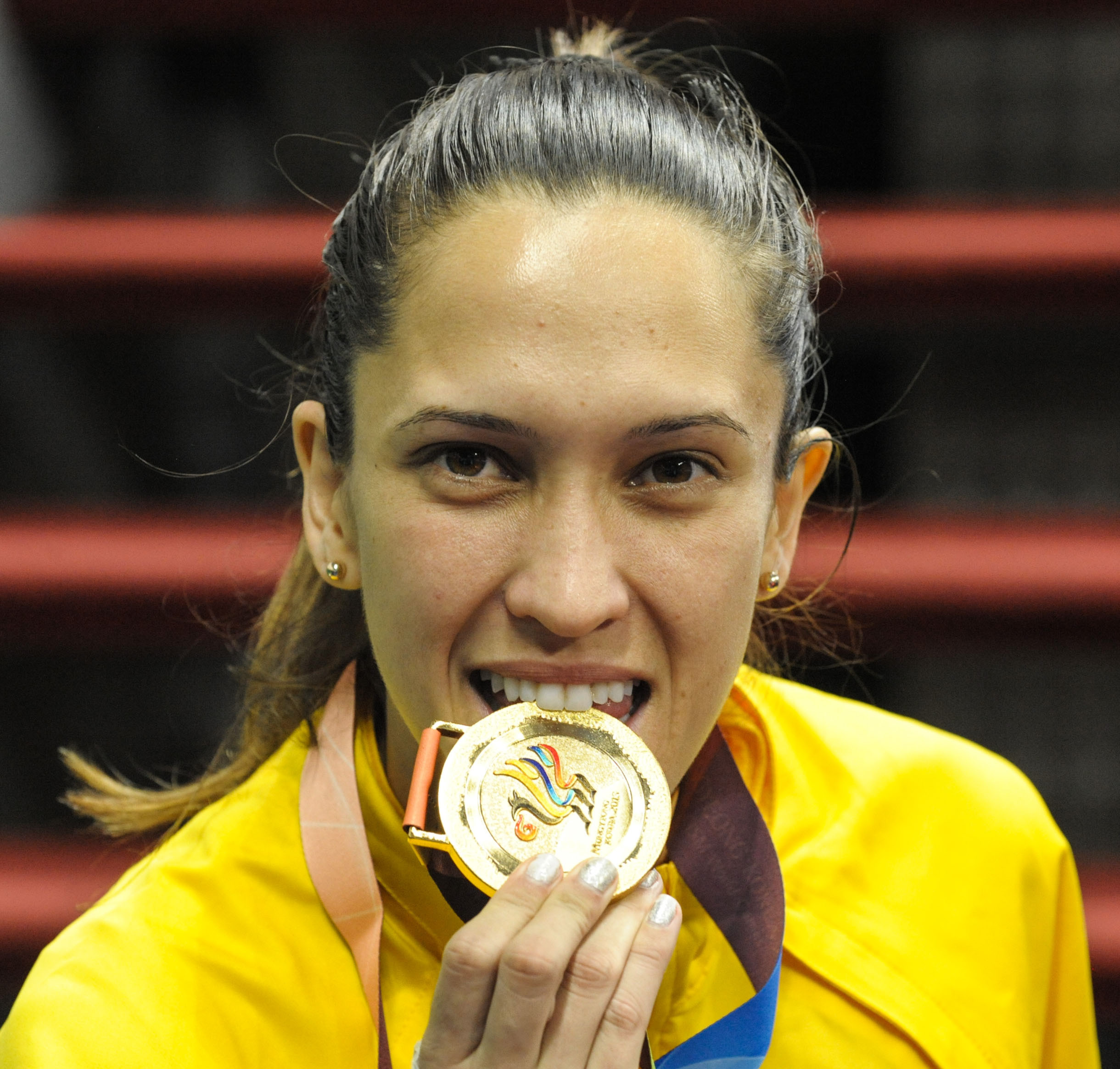
- Sing at the 2015 Military World Games

Personal information
- Born: August 21, 1990 (age 35) Rio de Janeiro, Brazil
- Height: 167 cm (5 ft 6 in)

Sport
- Sport: Taekwondo
Medal record
Representing Brazil
World Championships
| Bronze medal – third place | 2015 Chelyabinsk | -46 kg |
Pan American Games
| Bronze medal – third place | 2015 Toronto | -49 kg |
South American Games
| Bronze medal – third place | 2014 Santiago | -49 kg |
Military World Games
| Gold medal – first place | 2015 Mungyeong | -46 kg |
Grand Prix
| Bronze medal – third place | 2017 London | -49 kg |

Iris Silva Tang Sing (born August 21, 1990) is a taekwondo competitor from Brazil. She won bronze medals at the world championships and at the Pan American Games in 2015, and qualified for the 2016 Summer Olympics in the 49 kg division.
