= Katherine Dumar =

Colombian taekwondo practitioner

Personal information
- Full name: Katherine Dumar Portacio
- Born: 27 September 1993 (age 32)
- Height: 1.58 m (5 ft 2 in)
- Weight: 65 kg (143 lb)

Sport
- Country: Colombia
- Sport: Taekwondo
Medal record
Representing Colombia
Women's taekwondo
Event	1st	2nd	3rd
World Championships	0	0	1
Pan American Games	0	0	1
Pan American Championships	1	2	1
CAC Games	0	0	1
South American Games	1	0	1
Bolivarian Games	2	0	1
Total	4	2	6
World Championships
Bronze medal – third place	2015 Chelyabinsk	67 kg
Pan American Games
Bronze medal – third place	2019 Lima	67 kg
Pan American Championships
Gold medal – first place	2012 Sucre	67 kg
Silver medal – second place	2016 Querétaro	67 kg
Silver medal – second place	2022 Punta Cana	62 kg
Bronze medal – third place	2014 Aguascalientes	67 kg
Central American and Caribbean Games
Bronze medal – third place	2014 Veracruz	67 kg
South American Games
Gold medal – first place	2014 Santiago	67 kg
Bronze medal – third place	2022 Asunción	67 kg
Bolivarian Games
Gold medal – first place	2013 Trujillo	67 kg
Gold medal – first place	2017 Santa Marta	67 kg
Bronze medal – third place	2022 Valledupar	67 kg

Katherine Dumar (born 27 September 1993) is a Colombian taekwondo practitioner.

She won a bronze medal in welterweight at the 2015 World Taekwondo Championships, after being defeated by Nur Tatar in the semifinal. Her achievements at the Pan American Taekwondo Championships include a gold medal in 2012, a silver medal in 2016, and a bronze medal in 2014.

She won one of the bronze medals in her event at the 2022 South American Games in Asunción, Paraguay.

== Achievements ==
Year	Tournament	Location	Result	Event
Representing Colombia
2012	Pan American Championships	Sucre, Bolivia	1st	67 kg
2013	Bolivarian Games	Trujillo, Peru	1st	67 kg
2014	South American Games	Santiago, Chile	1st	67 kg
2014	Pan American Championships	Aguascalientes, Mexico	3rd	67 kg
2014	Central American and Caribbean Games	Veracruz, Mexico	3rd	67 kg
2015	World Championships	Chelyabinsk, Russia	3rd	67 kg
2016	Pan American Championships	Querétaro, Mexico	2nd	67 kg
2017	Bolivarian Games	Santa Marta, Colombia	1st	67 kg
2019	Pan American Games	Lima, Peru	3rd	67 kg
2022	Pan American Championships	Punta Cana, Dominican Republic	2nd	62 kg
2022	Bolivarian Games	Valledupar, Colombia	3rd	67 kg
2022	South American Games	Asunción, Paraguay	3rd	67 kg
