= Aykhan Taghizade =

Azerbaijani taekwondo practitioner

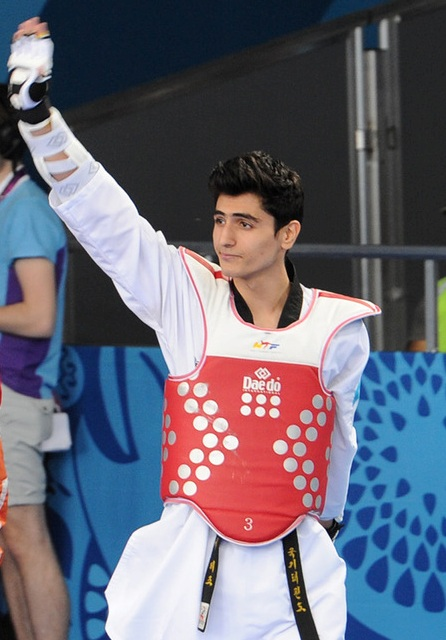
- Aykhan Taghizade in 2015.

Personal information
- Born: 20 January 1996 (age 30)
- Height: 187 cm (6 ft 2 in)
- Weight: 68 kg (150 lb)

Sport
- Sport: Taekwondo
Medal record
Representing Azerbaijan
European Games
Gold medal – first place	2015 Baku	-68 kg
Islamic Solidarity Games
Gold medal – first place	2017 Baku	-68 kg
Military World Games
Silver medal – second place	2015 Mungyeong	-68 kg
Universiade
Silver medal – second place	2017 Taipei	-68 kg
- Updated on 25 August 2017

Aykhan Taghizade (Azerbaijani: Ayxan Təqizadə; born 20 January 1996) is an Azerbaijani taekwondo practitioner who won a gold medal at the 2015 European Games.

In 2017, he competed in the men's featherweight event at the 2017 World Taekwondo Championships held in Muju, South Korea.
