= Taekwondo at the 2014 South American Games =

Taekwondo competition

There were about 8 taekwondo events in the 2014 South American Games.

== Medal summary ==
=== Medal table ===
* Host nation (Chile)

Rank	Nation	Gold	Silver	Bronze	Total
1	Venezuela (VEN)	2	1	3	6
2	Colombia (COL)	2	1	1	4
3	Argentina (ARG)	1	0	3	4
4	Chile (CHI)*	1	0	1	2
4	Suriname (SUR)	1	0	1	2
6	Panama (PAN)	1	0	0	1
7	Brazil (BRA)	0	4	1	5
8	Peru (PER)	0	1	1	2
8	Uruguay (URU)	0	1	1	2
10	Ecuador (ECU)	0	0	3	3
11	Aruba (ARU)	0	0	1	1
Totals (11 entries)		8	8	16	32

=== Men's events ===
Event	Gold	Silver	Bronze
Flyweight (58 kg)	Ignacio Puentes; Chile	Mayko Votta; Uruguay	Kevin Fernald; Suriname
Flyweight (58 kg)	Ignacio Puentes; Chile	Mayko Votta; Uruguay	Harold Avella; Colombia
Lightweight (68 kg)	Tosh Van Dijk; Suriname	Nicholas Pigozzi; Brazil	Diego Camacho; Ecuador
Lightweight (68 kg)	Tosh Van Dijk; Suriname	Nicholas Pigozzi; Brazil	Mario Guerra; Chile
Middleweight (80 kg)	Sebastian Crismanich; Argentina	Yair Medina; Colombia	André Llivisaca; Ecuador
Middleweight (80 kg)	Sebastian Crismanich; Argentina	Yair Medina; Colombia	Javier Medina; Venezuela
Heavyweight (+80 kg)	Carlos Rivas; Venezuela	Douglas Correa; Brazil	Braian Hernandez; Uruguay
Heavyweight (+80 kg)	Carlos Rivas; Venezuela	Douglas Correa; Brazil	Stuart Smit; Aruba

=== Women's events ===
Event	Gold	Silver	Bronze
Flyweight (49 kg)	Virginia Dellan; Venezuela	Lizbeth Canseco; Peru	Michelle Peralta; Ecuador
Flyweight (49 kg)	Virginia Dellan; Venezuela	Lizbeth Canseco; Peru	Iris Tang Sing; Brazil
Lightweight (57 kg)	Carolena Carstens; Panama	Adriana Martinez; Venezuela	Luciana Angiolillo; Argentina
Lightweight (57 kg)	Carolena Carstens; Panama	Adriana Martinez; Venezuela	Elizabeth Alvarado; Peru
Middleweight (67 kg)	Katherine Dumar; Colombia	Julia Dos Santos; Brazil	Alexis Daniela Arnoldt; Argentina
Middleweight (67 kg)	Katherine Dumar; Colombia	Julia Dos Santos; Brazil	Adanys Cordero; Venezuela
Heavyweight (+67 kg)	Sandra Vanegas; Colombia	Natalia Falavigna; Brazil	Paula Wegscheider; Argentina
Heavyweight (+67 kg)	Sandra Vanegas; Colombia	Natalia Falavigna; Brazil	Carolina Fernandez; Venezuela
