= Taekwondo at the 2015 Pan American Games – Qualification =

== Qualification ==
A total of 109 taekwondo athletes will qualify to compete at the games. The top twelve athletes, along with the host nation per weight category, excluding the women's +67 kg (which will qualify only 8 athletes) will qualify at qualification tournament in March 2015. A further nine wildcards (five male, four female) will be distributed by the Pan American Taekwondo Union, to countries which did not qualify any athletes in the qualification tournament. Only five nations did qualify any athletes, which allowed for four countries to receive an additional quota through a wildcard.

== Qualification timeline ==
Event	Date	Venue
2015 Taekwondo Official Qualification Tournament	March 11–12	(Mexico) Aguascalientes

== Qualification summary ==
NOC	Men				Women				Total
NOC	58 kg	68 kg	80 kg	+80 kg	49 kg	57 kg	67 kg	+67 kg	Total
Argentina	X		X	X		X	X		5
Aruba	X				X				2
Brazil	X	X	X	X	X	X	X	X	8
Canada	X	X	X	X	X	X	X	X	8
Chile		X	X	X		X	X		5
Colombia	X	X	X	X	X	X	X	X	8
Costa Rica							X		1
Cuba		X	X	X	X	X	X	X	7
Dominican Republic	X		X	X	X	X		X	6
Ecuador	X						X		2
El Salvador						X			1
Guatemala	X	X	X		X	X			5
Haiti							X		1
Honduras			X				X	X	3
Jamaica				X	X				2
Mexico	X	X	X	X	X	X	X	X	8
Nicaragua	X		X						2
Panama	X					X			2
Paraguay	X								1
Peru	X				X	X			3
Puerto Rico	X	X	X		X		X	X	6
Saint Vincent and the Grenadines			X						1
Suriname		X							1
Trinidad and Tobago		X							1
United States	X	X	X	X	X	X	X	X	8
Uruguay		X		X		X			3
Venezuela	X	X	X	X	X	X	X		7
Virgin Islands				X				X	2
Total: 28 NOCs	16	13	15	13	13	15	14	10	109

== Men ==
=== 58 kg ===
Competition	Vacancies	Qualified
Host Nation	1	Canada
Pan American Games Qualification Tournament	12	Argentina; Aruba; Brazil; Colombia; Dominican Republic; Guatemala; Mexico; Nicaragua; Peru; Puerto Rico; United States; Venezuela
Wildcard	3	Ecuador; Panama; Paraguay
TOTAL	16	

=== 68 kg ===
Competition	Vacancies	Qualified
Host Nation	1	Canada
Pan American Games Qualification Tournament	12	Brazil; Chile; Colombia; Cuba; Guatemala; Mexico; Puerto Rico; Suriname; Trinidad and Tobago; United States; Uruguay; Venezuela
TOTAL	13	

=== 80 kg ===
Competition	Vacancies	Qualified
Host Nation	1	Canada
Pan American Games Qualification Tournament	12	Argentina; Brazil; Chile; Colombia; Cuba; Dominican Republic; Guatemala; Honduras; Mexico; Puerto Rico; United States; Venezuela
Wildcard	2	Nicaragua; Saint Vincent and the Grenadines
TOTAL	15	

=== +80 kg ===
Competition	Vacancies	Qualified
Host Nation	1	Canada
Pan American Games Qualification Tournament	12	Argentina; Brazil; Chile; Colombia; Cuba; Dominican Republic; Jamaica; Mexico; United States; Uruguay; Venezuela; Virgin Islands
TOTAL	13	

== Women ==
=== 49 kg ===
Competition	Vacancies	Qualified
Host Nation	1	Canada
Pan American Games Qualification Tournament	11	~~Argentina~~; Aruba; Brazil; Colombia; Cuba; Dominican Republic; Guatemala; Jamaica; Mexico; Peru; Puerto Rico; United States
Wildcard	1	Venezuela
TOTAL	13	

- The Argentinian athlete tested positive for doping, and Venezuela was given a wildcard to replace her.

=== 57 kg ===
Competition	Vacancies	Qualified
Host Nation	1	Canada
Pan American Games Qualification Tournament	12	Argentina; Brazil; Chile; Colombia; Cuba; Dominican Republic; Guatemala; Mexico; Panama; Peru; United States; Venezuela
Wildcard	1	El Salvador; Uruguay
TOTAL	15	

=== 67 kg ===
Competition	Vacancies	Qualified
Host Nation	1	Canada
Pan American Games Qualification Tournament	12	Argentina; Brazil; Chile; Colombia; Costa Rica; Cuba; Ecuador; Honduras; Mexico; Puerto Rico; United States; Venezuela
Wildcard	~~2~~ 1	~~Bolivia~~; Haiti
TOTAL	14	

- The Bolivian athlete was murdered and thus the nation decided to not use the wildcard spot.

=== +67 kg ===
Competition	Vacancies	Qualified
Host Nation	1	Canada
Pan American Games Qualification Tournament	8	Brazil; Colombia; Cuba; Dominican Republic; Honduras; Mexico; Puerto Rico; United States
Wildcard	1	Virgin Islands
TOTAL	10	
