= Lee Dae-hoon =

South Korean taekwondoin (born 1992)

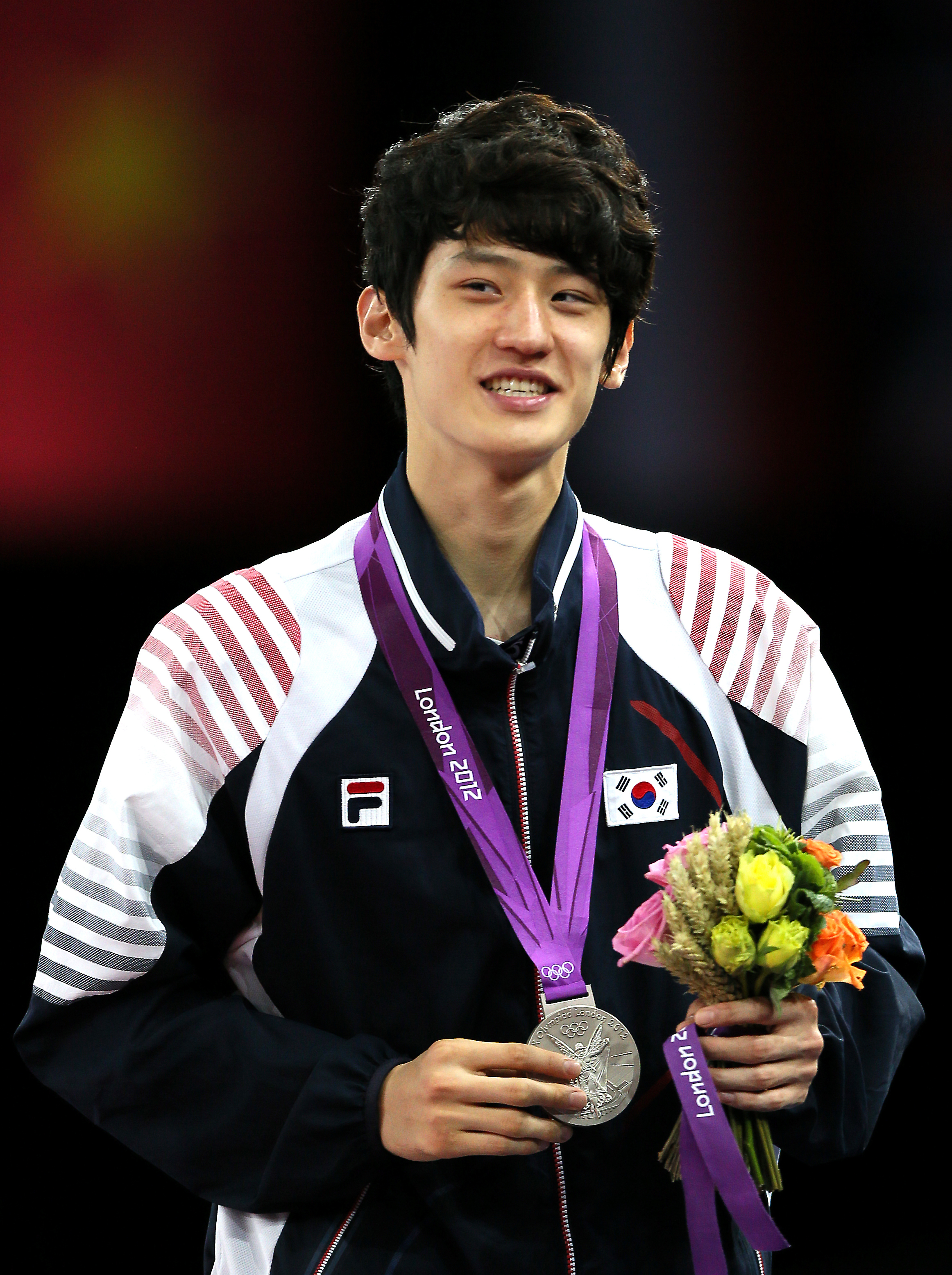
- Lee at the 2012 Summer Olympics

Personal information
- Born: February 5, 1992 (age 34) Seoul, South Korea
- Education: Yong In University (B.A.); Yonsei University (M.A.); Sejong University (Ph.D.)
- Height: 183 cm (6 ft 0 in)
- Weight: 68 kg (150 lb)

Sport
- Sport: Taekwondo
- Retired: 2020 Tokyo Olympics
Medal record
Representing South Korea
Olympic Games
Silver medal – second place	2012 London	58 kg
Bronze medal – third place	2016 Rio De Janeiro	68 kg
World Championships
Gold medal – first place	2011 Gyeongju	63 kg
Gold medal – first place	2013 Puebla	63 kg
Gold medal – first place	2017 Muju	68 kg
Bronze medal – third place	2019 Manchester	68 kg
Grand Prix
Gold medal – first place	2014 Suzhou	68 kg
Gold medal – first place	2015 Manchester	68 kg
Gold medal – first place	2015 Mexico City (F)	68 kg
Gold medal – first place	2016 Baku (F)	68 kg
Gold medal – first place	2017 Moscow	68 kg
Gold medal – first place	2017 Rabat	68 kg
Gold medal – first place	2017 Abidjan (F)	68 kg
Gold medal – first place	2018 Rome	68 kg
Gold medal – first place	2018 Taoyuan	68 kg
Gold medal – first place	2018 Manchester	68 kg
Gold medal – first place	2018 Fujairah (F)	68 kg
Gold medal – first place	2019 Moscow (F)	68 kg
Silver medal – second place	2015 Moscow	68 kg
Silver medal – second place	2019 Rome	68 kg
Silver medal – second place	2019 Sofia	68 kg
Bronze medal – third place	2015 Samsun	68 kg
Bronze medal – third place	2019 Chiba	68 kg
Asian Games
Gold medal – first place	2010 Guangzhou	63 kg
Gold medal – first place	2014 Incheon	63 kg
Gold medal – first place	2018 Jakarta-Palembang	68 kg
Asian Championships
Gold medal – first place	2012 Ho Chi Minh City	58 kg
Gold medal – first place	2014 Tashkent	63 kg

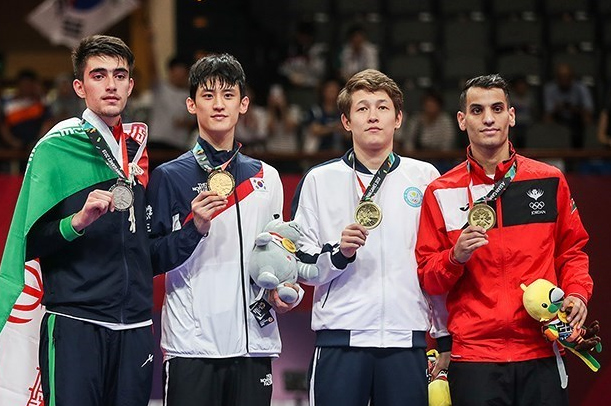
2018 Asian Games podium

Lee Dae-Hoon (Korean: 이대훈; Korean pronunciation: [i.dɛ̝.ɦun]; born February 5, 1992) is a South Korean former taekwondo athlete who is head coach of the U.S. national taekwondo team. He won a silver medal in the men's 58 kg event at the 2012 Summer Olympics and a bronze medal in the men's 68 kg event at the 2016 Summer Olympics. Lee is a former world No. 1 in the under-68 kg weight class.

== Education ==
Lee attended Seoul Junggye Primary School, Hansung Middle School, and Hansung High School, and later majored in Taekwondo Instruction at Yong In University. He obtained a master's degree in Sports and Leisure Studies at Yonsei University.

In August 2023, Lee obtained a doctoral degree from Sejong University in his doctoral thesis, Development Direction of Taekwondo Performance through 4th Industrial Technology.

== Career ==
Lee grew up practicing martial arts at his father's taekwondo academy from the age of five.

Lee won the gold medal at the 2010 Asian Games, and repeated the feat at the 2014 Asian Games in Incheon, South Korea.

Originally a bantamweight (under 63 kg), Lee temporarily went down in weight to flyweight (under 58 kg) after the 2011 World Championships in order to compete at the 2012 Summer Olympics, where there were only four weight classes. Lee made his international flyweight debut at the 2011 World Taekwondo Olympic Qualification Tournament in Baku, Azerbaijan, where he had his first international loss to 2008 Summer Olympic silver medalist Gabriel Mercedes 14–12 in the semifinals. In May 2012, however, he captured his first flyweight gold medal at the 2012 Asian Taekwondo Championships, beating reigning Asian flyweight champion Pen-Ek Karaket 8–4 in the final bout.

At the 2016 Summer Olympics, Lee won a bronze medal after defeating Belgium's Jaouad Achab 11–7. A few months later, at the 2016 World Taekwondo Grand Prix, Lee won a gold medal after defeating Achab 5–4.

Lee's father, Lee Joo-Yeol, used to run his own taekwondo academy.

In 2021, Lee announced his retirement following the 2020 Summer Olympics.

In 2022, Lee was appointed as a commentator at the 2022 Asian Games in Hangzhou and the 2024 Olympic Games by broadcasting on MBC.

In March 2023, Lee was appointed as a coach of the Daejeon Metropolitan City Hall Taekwondo team. In May, he was appointed as a national team coach for the 2023 World Taekwondo Championships in Baku, Azerbaijan. In June, he was elected to the World Taekwondo Athletes' Committee for the 2023–2027 term.

In 2024, Lee served as an adjunct professor at Sejong University, and in 2025, he was appointed as a full-time professor in the Department of Taekwondo at Dong-A University.

On March 4, 2026, USA Taekwondo announced the appointment of Lee as a national team coach. He will be based at the University of North Carolina at Charlotteas part of the Team USA staff and will work with U.S. athletes as the program builds toward the 2028 Summer Olympics in Los Angeles. The term runs through 2032, covering 2032 Summer Olympics in Brisbane.

== Honours ==
In 2018, at the 56th Korea Sports Awards, Lee received the Cheongnyong Medal, the highest class of the Order of Sport Merit, which is awarded to individuals for outstanding achievements in sports.

== Personal life ==
Lee became engaged to his girlfriend in 2018, and they married on May 25, 2019. They have one son, Lee Ye-chan, who was born in November 2018.

== Filmography ==
=== Television shows ===
Year	Title	Role	Notes	Ref.
2014	Cool Kiz on The Block	Guest	Episode 48	
2016	My Little Television	Participant	Episode 67–68	
2019	Radio Star	Guest	Episode 598	
2020	Video Star	Guest	Episode 180	
2020	Master in the House	Guest	Episode 218–219	
2020–2021	The Gentlemen's League	Cast Member		
2021–2023	The Gentlemen's League 2	Cast Member		
2022	Legend Festival	Participant		
2022	The Return of Superman		Episode 417, 428, 439	
2023–2025	The Gentlemen's League 3	Cast Member		
2024	League of Universities: The Athlete Boys	Coach		
2024	League of Universities: The Athlete Boys Special	Coach		
2025	The Gentlemen's League 4	Cast Member		
2025	Tomorrow is Taekwondo King	Host		
