= Ahmad Roman Abasi =

Afghan taekwondoin

Ahmad Roman Abasi (born 1992) is an Afghan professional taekwondo athlete and human rights advocate. He has won five senior medals at international events, including a bronze medal at the Asian Games 2014 in Incheon, Korea.

Abasi is an outspoken human rights advocate and has founded and continues to run the Labkhand Charity Foundation and Peace and Prosperity Organization, leading numerous social justice campaigns to support the people of Afghanistan.

In March 2022, Abasi and his family were forced to flee Afghanistan, to avoid persecution for his advocacy efforts, securing a humanitarian visa to Australia with the assistance of the International Olympic Committee and the Australian Olympic Committee.

== Early life and education ==
Born in Kabul, Afghanistan in 1992, Abasi grew up in a family of 10, including his parents, four brothers and three sisters. He holds a bachelor's degree in Sports and Law.

== Career ==
Abasi started Taekwondo at the age of 10 at a local club in Kabul, Afghanistan, after his parents encouraged him to take up the sport to improve his physical fitness and discipline.

Abasi has competed for Afghanistan's junior and senior international teams, winning several medals at national and regional level across Afghanistan as well as international open championships. His most famous victory came at the Asian Games 2014 in Incheon, where he defeated Asian Championships silver medallist Yaser Bamatraf en route to a bronze medal.

Abasi won a gold medal at the Indian Open and Iran Open as well as a silver medal at the Jordan Open. He has also represented Afghanistan at the World Taekwondo Championships, the Asian Youth Championships and the Asian Club Games Championships.

After a string of victories, Abasi met and received special recognition from President Ashraf Ghani.

== Human rights advocacy ==
Whilst competing, Abasi was driven to use his public profile to advocate for fellow athletes and citizens’ human rights. He first understood the power of his voice when he made a viral social media post about Afghan athletes’ salaries. Upon discovering that their monthly salary was just $USD15, he wrote on a piece of paper: "Afghanistan's national athletes have a monthly salary of $15, WHY?".

He posted a picture of this sentence, kickstarting an online campaign that attracted over 12,000 athletes within just 8 days. The president of Afghanistan's sports sector joined the movement, significantly increasing athletes’ salaries a month later from $15 to over $60.

Abasi founded and continues to run the Labkhand Charity Foundation and the Peace and Prosperity Organization.

These organizations have provided aid to thousands of victims of war and vulnerable individuals, and raised awareness and funds to support various human rights causes as well as orphaned children and individuals with disabilities. They have also assisted the families of members of Afghanistan's security and defence forces and supported athletes fighting discrimination or abuse, including ensuring the safe participation of girls in sports.

== Fleeing Afghanistan ==
In August 2021, the Taliban returned to power in Afghanistan, leading to an unstable political environment, particularly for women's rights and social justice advocates. Many of these figures faced persecution, imprisonment and even death. Abasi was therefore forced to flee Afghanistan for his and his family's safety.

Abasi fled Afghanistan in March 2022, after securing a humanitarian visa to Australia with the assistance of the International Olympic Committee and the Australian Olympic Committee. Under this program, he and his family spent an initial period in Pakistan, before settling in Australia in June 2022.

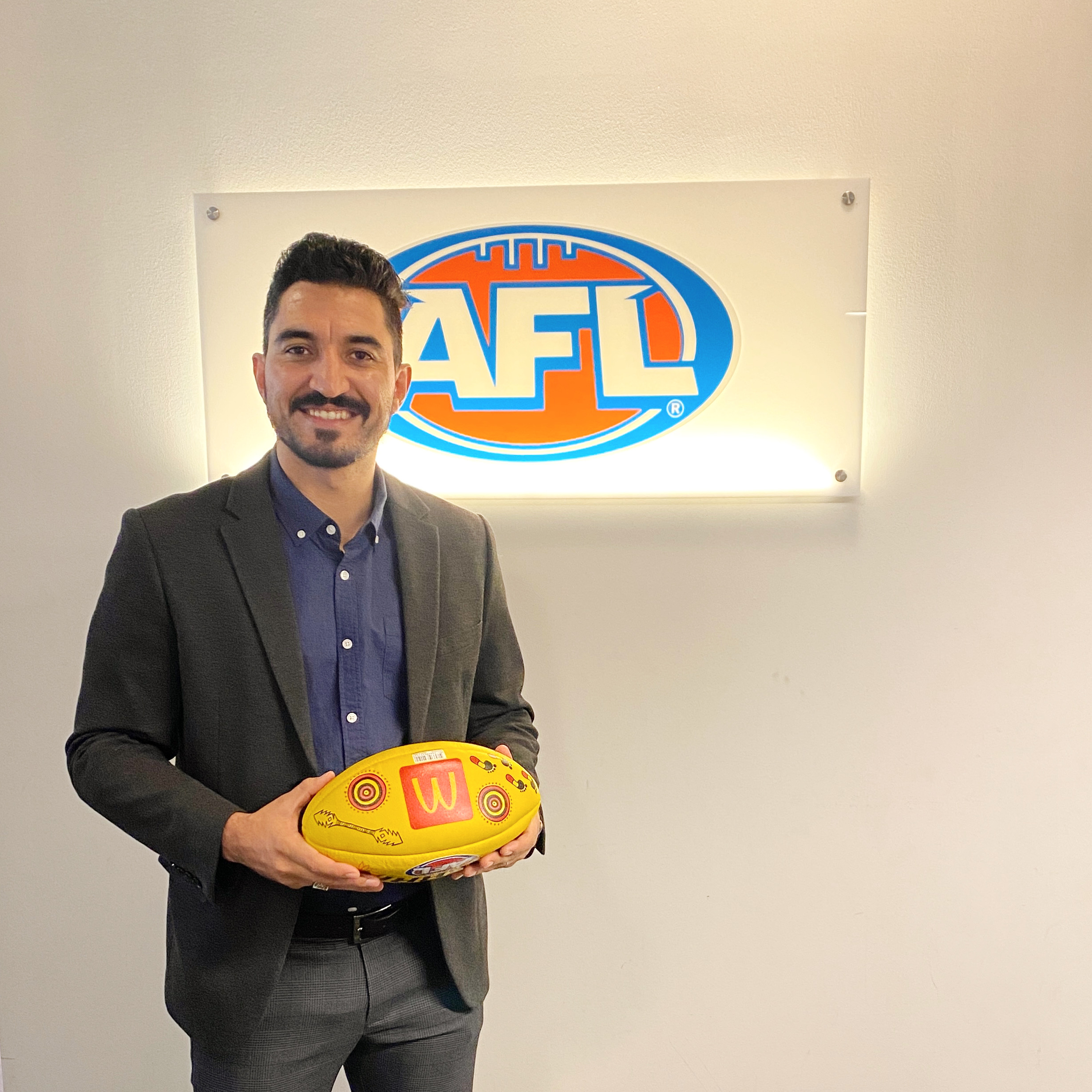
Ahmad Roman Abasi in Australia, following his evacuation from Afghanistan

== Continuing advocacy ==
As Abasi and his family have continued to rebuild their lives in Australia, he has persisted in advocating for the rights of Afghan women and all of the country's citizens, collaborating with local Australian organizations and engaging with the community to raise awareness about the situation in Afghanistan.

He now works as a sports coordinator for Reclink Australia, delivering support to refugees in New South Wales.
