= Ignacio Morales (taekwondo) =

Chilean taekwondo practitioner

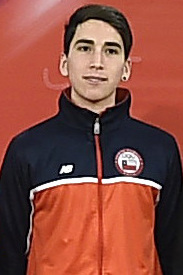

Personal information
- Born: 12 August 1995 (age 30) Santiago, Chile

Sport
- Sport: Taekwondo
Medal record
Representing Chile
Men's taekwondo
Pan American Games
Silver medal – second place	2023 Santiago	Team
Bronze medal – third place	2019 Lima	68 kg
South American Games
Gold medal – first place	2014 Santiago	58 kg
Gold medal – first place	2018 Cochabamba	68 kg
Gold medal – first place	2022 Asunción	68 kg
Bolivarian Games
Silver medal – second place	2022 Valledupar	68 kg

Ignacio Morales (born 12 August 1995) is a Chilean taekwondo athlete.

He competed at the 2016 Summer Olympics in Rio de Janeiro, in the men's 68 kg.

In 2017, he competed in the men's featherweight event at the 2017 World Taekwondo Championships held in Muju, South Korea.

He won one of the bronze medals in the men's 68 kg event at the 2019 Pan American Games held in Lima, Peru. He defeated Carl Nickolas of the United States in his bronze medal match.
