= Óscar Muñoz =

Colombian taekwondo practitioner

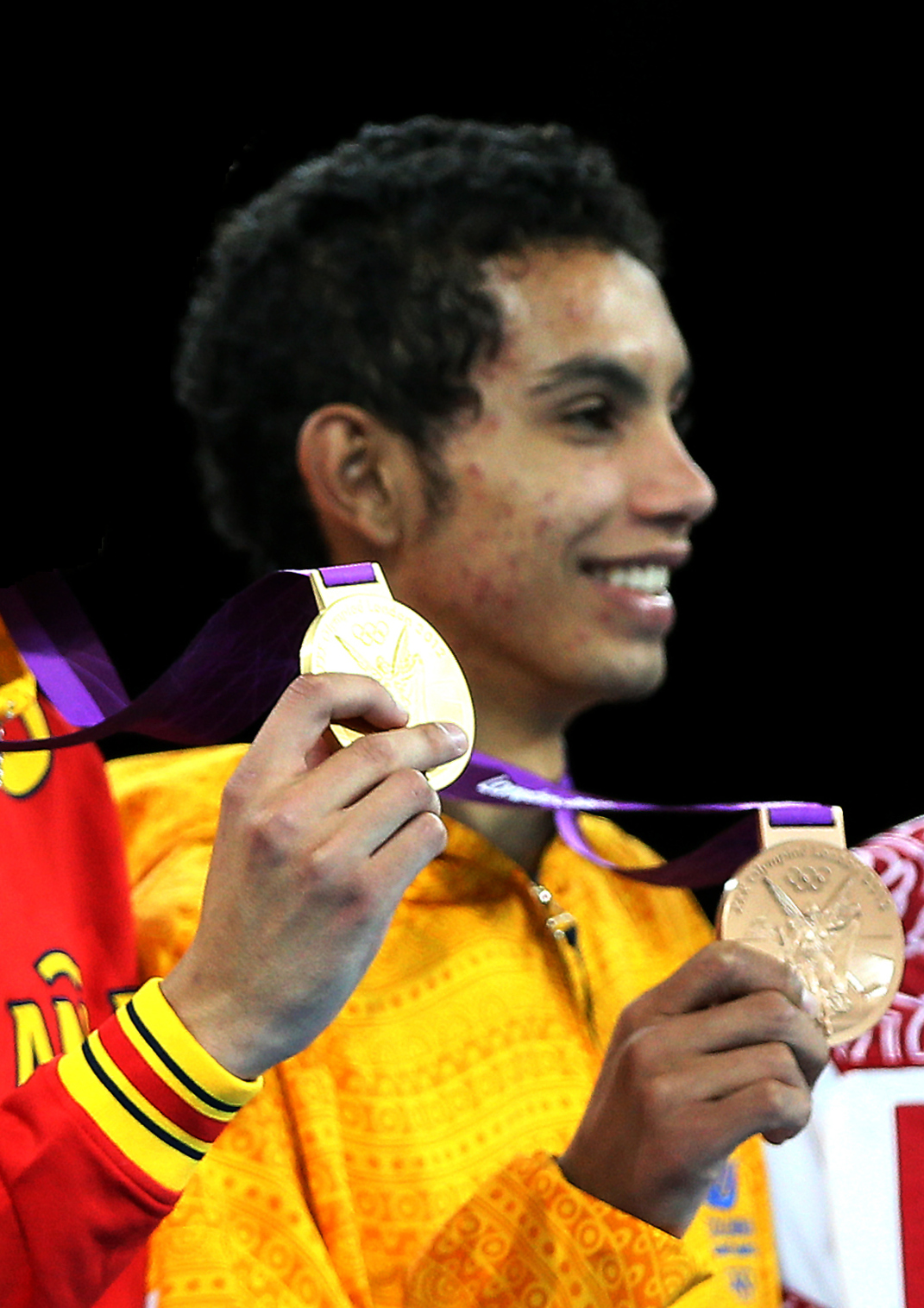
- Muñoz at the 2012 Olympics

Personal information
- Born: 9 May 1993 (age 33) Valledupar, Colombia
- Height: 178 cm (5 ft 10 in)
- Weight: 57 kg

Sport
- Sport: Taekwondo
- Coached by: Rene Forero (national); Alvaro Vidal (personal)
Medal record
Representing Colombia
Men's taekwondo
Olympic Games
Bronze medal – third place	2012 London	58 kg
Pan American Championships
Silver medal – second place	2016 Querétaro	58 kg
Bronze medal – third place	2010 Monterrey	58 kg
Bronze medal – third place	2012 Sucre	58 kg
Central American and Caribbean Games
Bronze medal – third place	2014 Veracruz	63 kg
Bolivarian Games
Gold medal – first place	2013 Trujillo	58 kg

Óscar Luis Muñoz Oviedo (born 9 May 1993) is a Colombian taekwondo practitioner who won a bronze medal at the 2012 Summer Olympics in the -58 kg weight class. This was the fifth Olympic medal for Colombia at the 2012 Summer Olympics, and the first medal in this sport. At the 2016 Olympics he was eliminated in the first bout.

Muñoz took up taekwondo aged 12. In March 2016 he started working as a taekwondo coach.
