= Pürevjavyn Temüüjin =

Mongol taekwondo athlete

Personal information
- Native name: Пүрэвжавын Тэмүүжин
- Nationality: Mongolia
- Born: 2 June 1994 (age 32) Darkhan, Mongolia
- Height: 173 cm (5 ft 8 in)

Sport
- Country: Mongolia
- Sport: Taekwondo
- Weight class: 63–68–74–80 kg
- Club: Aldar
- Team: Temuujin Taekwondo Club

Achievements and titles
- Olympic finals: 9th (2016)
- World finals: 17th (2015) 17th (2017)
- Regional finals: 5th (2014)
Medal record
Men's taekwondo
Representing Mongolia
World Military Championships
Bronze medal – third place	2018 Rio de Janeiro	–74 kg
Olympic Qualification Tournament
Silver medal – second place	2016 Pasay	–68 kg

Pürevjavyn Temüüjin (born 2 June 1994), also Purevjavyn Temujin, is a Mongolian taekwondo athlete.

He is the first Mongolian taekwondo athlete to compete at the Olympics, debuting at the 2016 Summer Olympics in Rio de Janeiro, in the men's 68 kg.
