= Edgar Contreras (taekwondo) =

Venezuelan taekwondo athlete

Personal information
- Nationality: Venezuelan
- Born: 16 July 1992 (age 33)

Sport
- Sport: Taekwondo

Edgar Contreras (born 16 July 1992) is a Venezuelan taekwondo athlete.

He competed at the 2016 Summer Olympics in Rio de Janeiro, in the men's 68 kg.

In 2017, he competed in the men's featherweight event at the 2017 World Taekwondo Championships held in Muju, South Korea.
