= Stevens Barclais =

French taekwondo practitioner

Medal record

Representing France

Men's taekwondo

World Championships
Bronze medal – third place	2013 Puebla	Bantamweight

Universiade
Silver medal – second place	2011 Shenzhen	Bantamweight

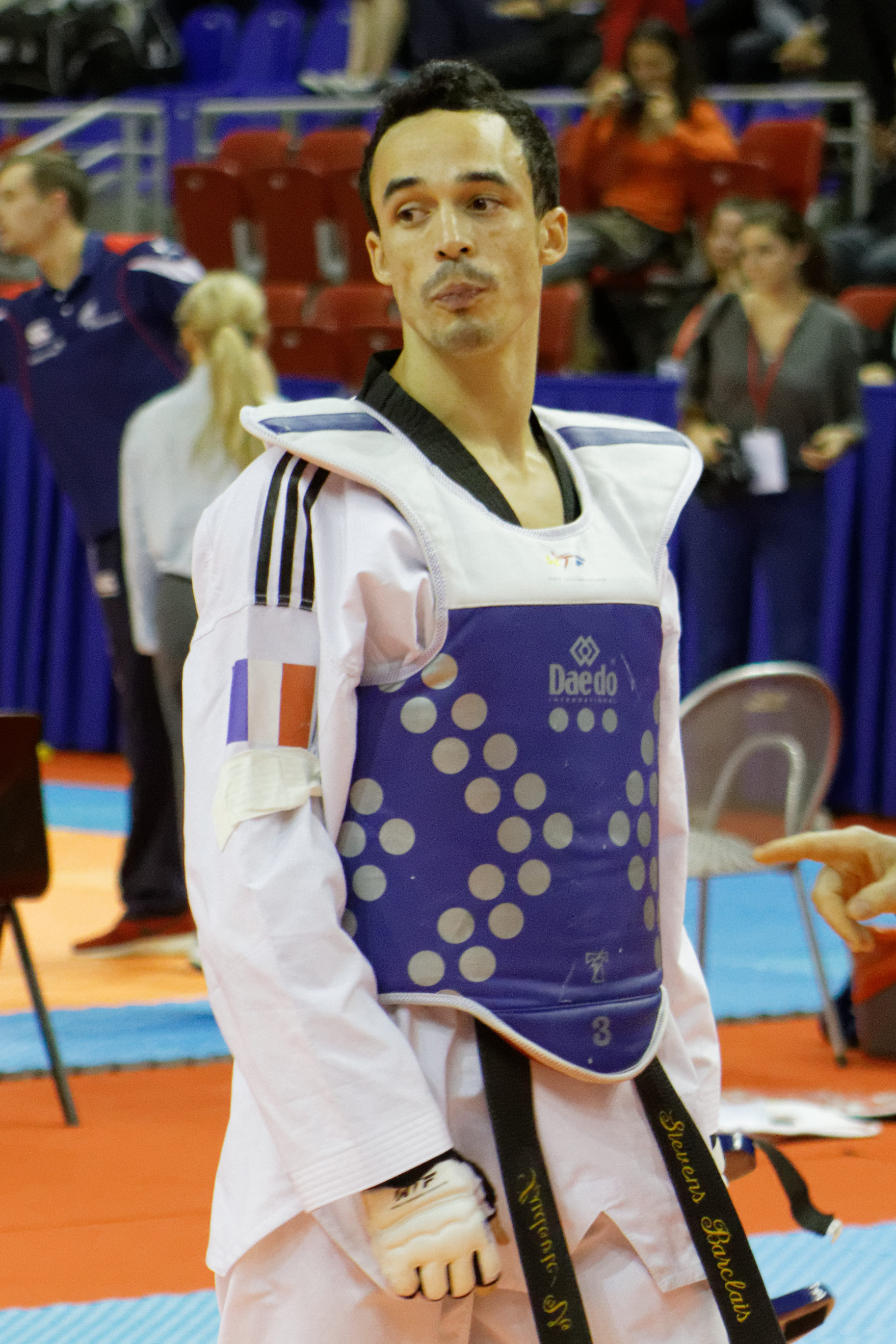
Stevens Barclais Taekwondo

Stevens Barclais (born 9 July 1984 in Cergy-Pontoise, Île-de-France) is a French taekwondo practitioner. Barclais won the bronze medal in the men's bantamweight (under 63 kg) division at the 2013 World Taekwondo Championships in Puebla.
