= Joel González (taekwondo) =

Spanish taekwondo practitioner

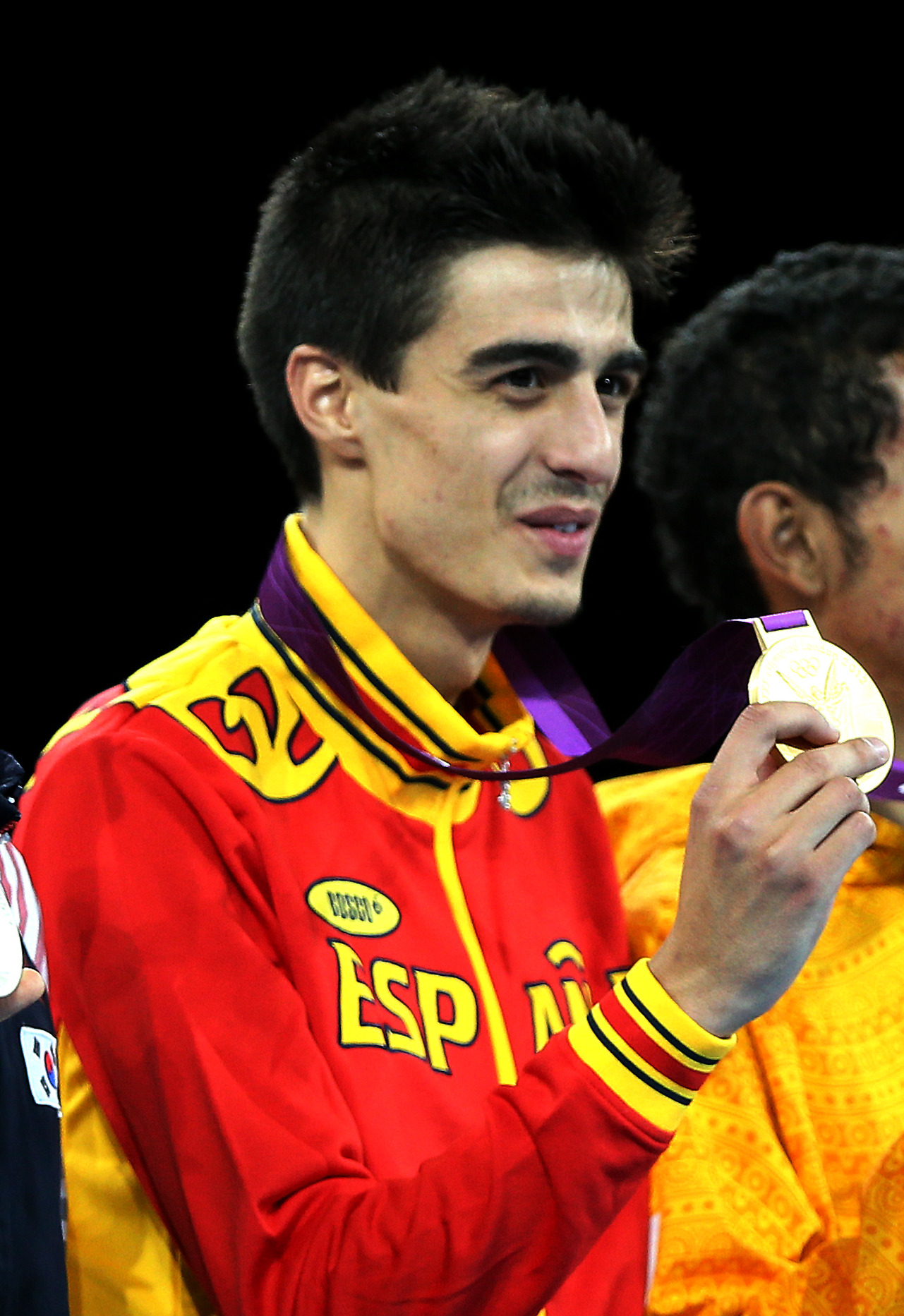
- González at the 2012 Olympics

Personal information
- Full name: Joel González Bonilla
- Born: 30 September 1989 (age 37) Figueres, Spain
- Height: 1.85 m (6 ft 1 in)
- Weight: 61 kg (134 lb)

Sport
- Sport: Taekwondo
Medal record
Representing Spain
Event	1st	2nd	3rd
Olympic Games	1	0	1
World Championships	2	1	0
European Games	0	0	1
European Championships	2	0	0
Summer Universiade	0	0	1
Total	5	1	2
Olympic Games
Gold medal – first place	2012 London	58 kg
Bronze medal – third place	2016 Rio de Janeiro	68 kg
World Championships
Gold medal – first place	2009 Copenhagen	58 kg
Gold medal – first place	2011 Gyeongju	58 kg
Silver medal – second place	2015 Chelyabinsk	63 kg
European Games
Bronze medal – third place	2015 Baku	68 kg
European Championships
Gold medal – first place	2010 Saint Petersburg	58 kg
Gold medal – first place	2012 Manchester	58 kg
Universiade
Bronze medal – third place	2015 Gwangju	68 kg

Joel González Bonilla (born 30 September 1989) is a taekwondo practitioner from Spain. He won the gold medal at the 2012 Olympics in the 58 kg division and the bronze medal at the 2016 Olympics in the 68 kg category.

González took up taekwondo at his father's gym Tae Sport. He has a degree in administration from the Technical University of Cartagena.
