= Uno Sanli =

Swedish taekwondo practitioner

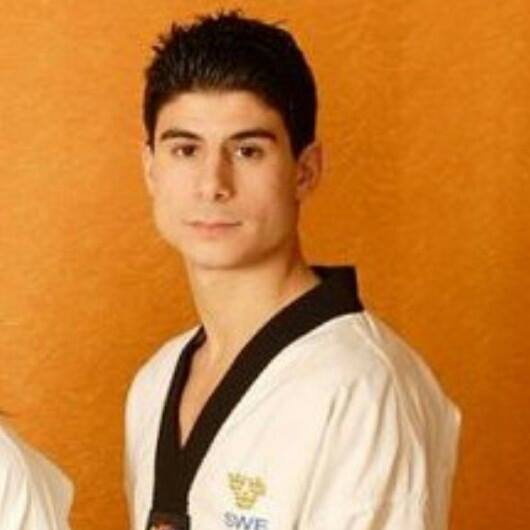
Uno Sanli

Uno Sanli (born 5 January 1989 in Eskilstuna) is a Swedish taekwondo athlete. He competed at the 2012 Summer Olympics in the men's -58 kg division. Currently he lives in Skärholmen.
