= Raad Thabet =

Palestinian militant (1972–2024)

- رائد ثابت
- Born: Raad Thabet
- Died: 28 March 2024; Al-Shifa Hospital, Gaza City, Gaza Strip
- Cause of death: Killed by Israeli forces during military operation
- Military career
- Allegiance: Hamas
- Military wing: Izz al-Din al-Qassam Brigades
- Years of service: Unknown–2024
- Rank: Senior commander
- Commands: Arms Industry + Recruitment and supply acquisition
- Known for: Hamas logistics and recruitment operations
- Conflicts: Gaza war

Raad Thabet (died 28 March 2024) was a Palestinian militant and senior Hamas commander. He was the head of the militant group's recruitment and supply acquisition.

== Death ==
Several Hamas operatives, including Thabet, were killed by IDF troops from the Navy's Shayetet 13 unit, the Givati Brigade's Shaked Battalion, and the Duvdevan Unit after fleeing Al-Shifa Hospital's emergency department. Hamas confirmed Thabet's death on 30 January 2025.
