= Nursultan Mamayev =

Kazakh taekwondo practitioner

Medal record

Men's taekwondo

Representing Kazakhstan

Asian Games
Silver medal – second place	2014 Incheon	58 kg

Nursultan Mamayev (born 27 June 1993, in Shymkent) is a Kazakh taekwondo practitioner. He competed in the 58 kg event at the 2012 Summer Olympics and was eliminated in the preliminary round by Tamer Bayoumi.
