= Akkarin Kitwijarn =

Thai taekwondo practitioner

Personal information
- Born: July 8, 1995 (age 31) Ang Thong, Thailand
- Height: 1.76 m (5 ft 9 1/2 in)

Sport
- Country: Thailand
- Sport: Taekwondo
- Event: Bantamweight (-63 kg)
- Coached by: Choi Young-Seok
Medal record
Representing Thailand
Men's taekwondo
Asian Games
Silver medal – second place	2014 Incheon	Bantamweight
Asian Championships
Silver medal – second place	2014 Tashkent	Bantamweight

Akkarin Kitwijarn (Thai: อัครินทร์ กิจวิจารณ์; born 8 July 1995) is a male Thai taekwondo practitioner who was the silver medalist at the 2014 Asian Games in the under 49 kg class. Kitwijarn he also lose gold medals at the 2014 Asian Games and at the Asian Taekwondo Championships in 2014 Asian Taekwondo Championships
