= Jaouad Achab =

Belgian taekwondo practitioner

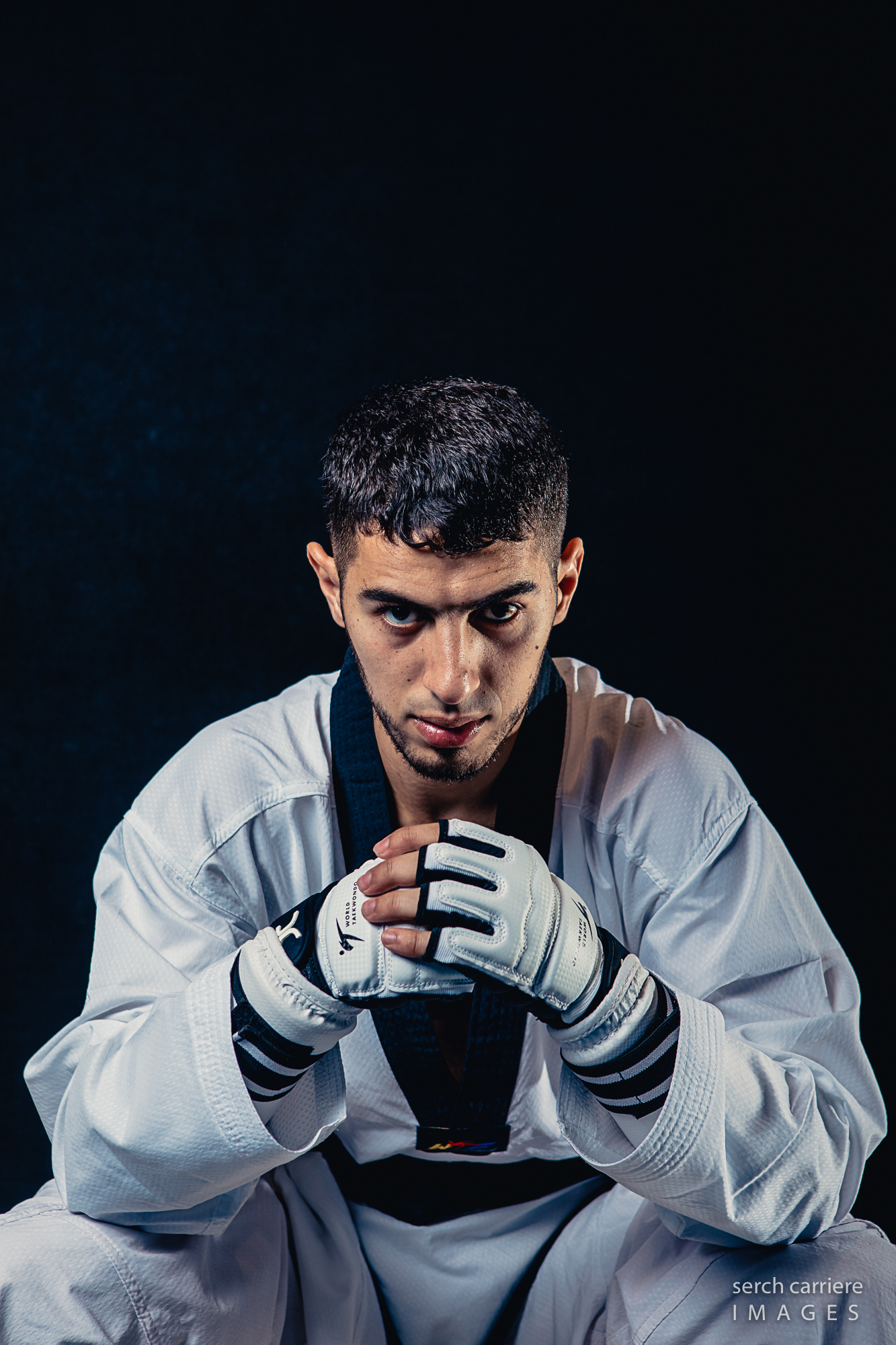

Personal information
- Nationality: Belgian
- Born: 20 August 1992 (age 33) Tangier, Morocco
- Height: 175 cm (5 ft 9 in)
- Weight: 64 kg (141 lb)
Medal record
Men's taekwondo
Representing Belgium
World Championships
Gold medal – first place	2015 Chelyabinsk	Bantamweight
Bronze medal – third place	2019 Manchester	Bantamweight
Grand Prix
Silver medal – second place	2014 Manchester	68 kg
Bronze medal – third place	2015 Mexico	68 kg
Silver medal – second place	2016 Baku	68 kg
European Championships
Gold medal – first place	2014 Baku	Bantamweight
Gold medal – first place	2016 Montreux	Bantamweight
Gold medal – first place	2019 Bari	Bantamweight
Universiade
Gold medal – first place	2015 Gwangju	Bantamweight

Jaouad Achab (born 20 August 1992) is a taekwondo practitioner from Belgium. He won the gold medal at the 2014 European Championships Men's 63 kg, and at the 2015 World Championships, becoming Belgium's first World Taekwondo champion.

In 2019, he won one of the bronze medals in the men's bantamweight event at the 2019 World Taekwondo Championships in Manchester, United Kingdom.
