= Taekwondo at the 2012 Summer Olympics – Qualification =

The Taekwondo competition at the 2012 Games will include 128 athletes, 64 in each gender, 16 in each of the eight weight divisions. Each competing nation will be allowed to enter a maximum of 4 competitors, two of each gender. Each nation will therefore be eligible to compete in a maximum of half the weight categories.

4 places are reserved for Great Britain as Host Country, and a further four shall invitational as decided by the Tripartite Commission. The remaining 120 places shall be allocated through a qualification process, in which athletes win quota places for their respective nation.

== Timeline ==
Event	Date	Venue
World Qualification Tournament	June 30 – July 3, 2011	Baku, Azerbaijan
Oceania Qualification Tournament	September 11, 2011	Nouméa, New Caledonia
Pan American Qualification Tournament	November 18–20, 2011	Querétaro, Mexico
Asian Qualification Tournament	November 26–27, 2011	Bangkok, Thailand
African Qualification Tournament	January 11–12, 2012	Cairo, Egypt
European Qualification Tournament	January 27–29, 2012	Kazan, Russia

== Qualification summary ==
NOC	Men				Women				Total
NOC	−58kg	−68kg	−80kg	+80kg	−49kg	−57kg	−67kg	+67kg	Total
Afghanistan		X	X						2
Algeria	X								1
Argentina			X		X				2
Armenia			X						1
Australia	X						X		2
Azerbaijan			X				X		2
Brazil		X						X	2
Cambodia								X	1
Canada			X	X			X		3
Central African Republic		X			X				2
Chile						X			1
China				X	X	X			3
Chinese Taipei	X				X	X			3
Colombia	X								1
Costa Rica	X								1
Croatia					X	X			2
Cuba				X		X		X	3
Dominican Republic	X								1
Egypt	X		X			X	X		4
Finland						X			1
France						X		X	2
Gabon				X					1
Germany					X		X		2
Great Britain		X	X			X	X		4
Greece				X					1
Grenada							X		1
Guatemala					X				1
Iran		X	X				X		3
Italy			X	X					2
Ivory Coast							X		1
Jamaica				X					1
Japan					X	X			2
Jordan		X			X			X	3
Kazakhstan	X						X	X	3
Kyrgyzstan			X						1
Lebanon						X			1
Mali				X					1
Mexico	X	X			X			X	4
Morocco			X		X			X	3
Netherlands			X						1
New Zealand		X	X			X			3
Nigeria		X		X					2
Panama					X				1
Papua New Guinea					X				1
Peru		X							1
Poland		X							1
Russia	X			X	X			X	4
Samoa				X				X	2
Senegal						X			1
Serbia		X				X		X	3
Slovenia				X			X	X	3
South Korea	X			X			X	X	4
Spain	X		X		X				3
Sweden	X						X		2
Tajikistan			X	X					2
Thailand	X				X	X			3
Tunisia								X	1
Turkey		X		X			X		3
Ukraine		X						X	2
United States		X	X			X	X		4
Uzbekistan		X		X				X	3
Vietnam	X						X		2
Yemen	X								1
Total: 63 NOCs	16	16	16	16	16	16	16	16	128

== Men's events ==
=== −58 kg ===
Competition	Places	Qualified athletes
World Qualification Tournament	3	Pen-ek Karaket (THA); Gabriel Mercedes (DOM); Lee Dae-hoon (KOR)
Oceania Qualification Tournament	1	Safwan Khalil (AUS)
Pan American Qualification Tournament	3	Óscar Muñoz (COL); Heiner Oviedo (CRC); Damián Villa (MEX)
Asian Qualification Tournament	3	Wei Chen-yang (TPE); Nursultan Mamayev (KAZ); Lê Huỳnh Châu (VIE)
African Qualification Tournament	2	Tamer Bayoumi (EGY); Mokdad El-Yamine (ALG)
European Qualification Tournament	3	Aleksey Denisenko (RUS); Joel González (ESP); Uno Sanli (SWE)
Host nation / Universality places	1	Tameem Al-Kubati (YEM)
Total	16	

=== −68 kg ===
Competition	Places	Qualified athletes
World Qualification Tournament	3	Servet Tazegül (TUR); Mohammad Bagheri Motamed (IRI); Diogo Silva (BRA)
Oceania Qualification Tournament	1	Logan Campbell (NZL)
Pan American Qualification Tournament	3	Idulio Islas (MEX); Peter López (PER); Terrence Jennings (USA)
Asian Qualification Tournament	3	Mohammad Abulibdeh (JOR); Dmitriy Kim (UZB); Rohullah Nikpai (AFG)
African Qualification Tournament	2	David Boui (CAF); Isah Mohammad (NGR)
European Qualification Tournament	3	Damir Fejzić (SRB); Michał Łoniewski (POL); Hryhorii Husarov (UKR)
Host nation / Universality places	1	Martin Stamper (GBR)
Total	16	

=== −80 kg ===
Competition	Places	Qualified athletes
World Qualification Tournament	3	Ramin Azizov (AZE); Yousef Karami (IRI); Mauro Sarmiento (ITA)
Oceania Qualification Tournament	1	Vaughn Scott (NZL)
Pan American Qualification Tournament	3	Sebastián Crismanich (ARG); Steven López (USA); Sébastien Michaud (CAN)
Asian Qualification Tournament	3	Nesar Ahmad Bahave (AFG); Rasul Abduraim (KGZ); Farkhod Negmatov (TJK)
African Qualification Tournament	2	Issam Chernoubi (MAR); Abdelrahman Ossama (EGY)
European Qualification Tournament	3	Arman Yeremyan (ARM); Tommy Mollet (NED); Nicolás García (ESP)
Host nation / Universality places	1	Lutalo Muhammad (GBR)
Total	16	

=== +80 kg ===
Competition	Places	Qualified athletes
World Qualification Tournament	3	Cha Dong-min (KOR); Gadzhi Umarov (RUS); Alexandros Nikolaidis (GRE)
Oceania Qualification Tournament	1	Kaino Thomsen (SAM)
Pan American Qualification Tournament	3	Robelis Despaigne (CUB); François Coulombe-Fortier (CAN); Kenneth Edwards (JAM)
Asian Qualification Tournament	3	Liu Xiaobo (CHN); Alisher Gulov (TJK); Akmal Irgashev (UZB)
African Qualification Tournament	2	Anthony Obame (GAB); Chika Chukwumerije (NGR)
European Qualification Tournament	3	Bahri Tanrıkulu (TUR); Carlo Molfetta (ITA); Ivan Trajkovič (SLO)
Host nation / Universality places	1	Daba Modibo Keïta (MLI)
Total	16	

== Women's events ==
=== −49 kg ===
Competition	Places	Qualified athletes
World Qualification Tournament	3	Wu Jingyu (CHN); Lucija Zaninović (CRO); Yang Shu-chun (TPE)
Oceania Qualification Tournament	1	Theresa Tona (PNG)
Pan American Qualification Tournament	3	Elizabeth Zamora (GUA); Jannet Alegría (MEX); Carola López (ARG)
Asian Qualification Tournament	3	Chanatip Sonkham (THA); Erika Kasahara (JPN); Dana Haidar (JOR)
African Qualification Tournament	2	Sanaa Atabrour (MAR); Catherine Kang (CAF)
European Qualification Tournament	3	Brigitte Yagüe (ESP); Sümeyye Manz (GER); Kristina Kim (RUS)
Host nation / Universality places	1	Carolena Carstens (PAN)
Total	16	

=== −57 kg ===
Competition	Places	Qualified athletes
World Qualification Tournament	3	Tseng Pei-hua (TPE); Hou Yuzhuo (CHN); Ana Zaninović (CRO)
Oceania Qualification Tournament	1	Robin Cheong (NZL)
Pan American Qualification Tournament	3	Nidia Muñoz (CUB); Yeny Contreras (CHI); Diana López (USA)
Asian Qualification Tournament	3	Rangsiya Nisaisom (THA); Andrea Paoli (LIB); Mayu Hamada (JPN)
African Qualification Tournament	2	Hedaya Malak (EGY); Bineta Diédhiou (SEN)
European Qualification Tournament	3	Dragana Gladović (SRB); Suvi Mikkonen (FIN); Marlène Harnois (FRA)
Host nation / Universality places	1	Jade Jones (GBR)
Total	16	

=== −67 kg ===
Competition	Places	Qualified athletes
World Qualification Tournament	3	Kim Mi-kyung (KOR); Farida Azizova (AZE); Elin Johansson (SWE)
Oceania Qualification Tournament	1	Carmen Marton (AUS)
Pan American Qualification Tournament	3	Karine Sergerie (CAN); Paige McPherson (USA); Andrea St. Bernard (GRN)
Asian Qualification Tournament	3	Sousan Hajipour (IRI); Chu Hoàng Diệu Linh (VIE); Gulnafis Aitmukhambetova (KAZ)
African Qualification Tournament	2	Seham El-Sawalhy (EGY); Ruth Gbagbi (CIV)
European Qualification Tournament	3	Nur Tatar (TUR); Helena Fromm (GER); Franka Anić (SLO)
Host nation / Universality places	1	Sarah Stevenson (GBR)
Total	16	

=== +67 kg ===
Competition	Places	Qualified athletes
World Qualification Tournament	3	Gwladys Épangue (FRA); An Sae-bom (KOR); Anastasia Baryshnikova (RUS)
Oceania Qualification Tournament	1	Talitiga Crawley (SAM)
Pan American Qualification Tournament	3	Natália Falavigna (BRA); María Espinoza (MEX); Glenhis Hernández (CUB)
Asian Qualification Tournament	3	Nadin Dawani (JOR); Feruza Yergeshova (KAZ); Natalya Mamatova (UZB)
African Qualification Tournament	2	Wiam Dislam (MAR); Khaoula Ben Hamza (TUN)
European Qualification Tournament	3	Maryna Konieva (UKR); Milica Mandić (SRB); Nuša Rajher (SLO)
Host nation / Universality places	1	Sorn Davin (CAM)
Total	16	
