= Taekwondo at the 2011 Pan American Games – Men's 58 kg =

Taekwondo – Men's 58 kg at the 2011 Pan American Games
- Venue: CODE II Gymnasium
- Dates: October 15
- Competitors: 14 from 14 nations

Medalists
Gold medal	Gabriel Mercedes	Dominican Republic
Silver medal	Damian Villa	Mexico
Bronze medal	Frank Diaz	Cuba
Bronze medal	Marcio Ferreira	Brazil

The men's 58 kg competition of the taekwondo events at the 2011 Pan American Games took place on the 15 of October at the CODE II Gymnasium. The defending Pan American Games champion is Yulis Gabriel Mercedes of the Dominican Republic, while the defending Pan American Championship, champion is Marcio Ferreira of Brazil.

== Schedule ==
All times are Central Standard Time (UTC-6).

Date	Time	Round
October 15, 2011	11:00	Preliminaries
October 15, 2011	12:30	Quarterfinals
October 15, 2011	17:00	Semifinals
October 15, 2011	18:00	Final

== Results ==
Legend

- PTG — Won by Points Gap
- SUP — Won by Superiority
- OT — Won on over time (Golden Point)
- DSQ — Won because of disqualification

=== Main bracket ===
Preliminary round
Jocelyn Addison (CAN)	9
Heiner Oviedo (CRC)	3
Nigel Ras (ARU)	5
Frank Diaz (CUB)	7
Óscar Muñoz (COL)	7
Mario Leal (VEN)	1
Damian Villa (MEX)	15
Audy Muller (AHO)	3
Olie Burton (USA)	11
Jhonnatan Mejia (GUA)	15
Victor Gonzalez (PAN)	9
Mayko Votta (URU)	10

Quarterfinals
Gabriel Mercedes (DOM)	7
Jocelyn Addison (CAN)	1
Frank Diaz (CUB)
Óscar Muñoz (COL)	DSQ
Damian Villa (MEX)	12
Jhonnatan Mejia (GUA)	8
Mayko Votta (URU)	2
Marcio Ferreira (BRA)	7

Semifinals
Gabriel Mercedes (DOM)	11
Frank Diaz (CUB)	2
Damian Villa (MEX)	17
Marcio Ferreira (BRA)	9

Gold medal match
Gabriel Mercedes (DOM)	8
Damian Villa (MEX)	7
