= 2011 Pan American Taekwondo Olympic Qualification Tournament =

The 2011 Pan American Qualification Tournament for London Olympic Games was held in Querétaro, Mexico from November 18 to November 20, 2011. Each country may enter maximum 2 male and 2 female divisions with only one in each division and the first three ranked athletes per weight division qualify their NOCs a place each for Olympic Games.

== Qualification summary ==
NOC	Men				Women				Total
NOC	−58kg	−68kg	−80kg	+80kg	−49kg	−57kg	−67kg	+67kg	Total
Argentina			X		X				2
Brazil								X	1
Canada			X	X			X		3
Chile						X			1
Colombia	X								1
Costa Rica	X								1
Cuba				X		X		X	3
Grenada							X		1
Guatemala					X				1
Jamaica				X					1
Mexico	X	X			X			X	4
Peru		X							1
United States		X	X			X	X		4
Total: 13 NOCs	3	3	3	3	3	3	3	3	24

== Men ==
=== −58 kg ===
18 November

Round of 16
Byron Vásquez (ESA)	14
Sven Lorrimer (GUY)	4
~~Víctor Solís (NCA)~~
Patricio Moreira (ECU)	DQ
Miguel Lasso (PAN)	0
Óscar Muñoz (COL)	12
Camilo Pérez (CHI)	4
Heiner Oviedo (CRC)	7
Jocelyn Joseph (HAI)	5
Raúl Franco (BOL)	6
Audy Muller (IOA)	5
Mayko Votta (URU)	4
Mauro Crismanich (ARG)	3
Damián Villa (MEX)	15

Quarterfinals
Márcio Wenceslau (BRA)	10
Byron Vásquez (ESA)	9
Patricio Moreira (ECU)	3
Óscar Muñoz (COL)	7
Heiner Oviedo (CRC)	9
Raúl Franco (BOL)	4
Audy Muller (IOA)	2
Damián Villa (MEX)	11

Semifinals
Márcio Wenceslau (BRA)	4
Óscar Muñoz (COL)	5
Heiner Oviedo (CRC)	7
Damián Villa (MEX)	6

Final
Óscar Muñoz (COL)	5
Heiner Oviedo (CRC)	4
3rd place
Márcio Wenceslau (BRA)	6
Damián Villa (MEX)	7

=== −68 kg ===
19 November

Round of 16
Nicholas Dusard (JAM)	13
Kirk Causadías (PAN)	1
Luis Colon (PUR)	12
Sergio García (ECU)	17
Víctor Zepeda (HON)	5
Terrence Jennings (USA)	10
Idulio Islas (MEX)	9
Dorian Alexander (TRI)	2
Mario Guerra (CHI)	3
Ángel Mora (CUB)	5
Franco Ríos (BOL)	8
Osvaldo Cáceres (PAR)	4
Federico Rosal (GUA)	8
Jhohanny Jean (DOM)	11

Quarterfinals
Peter López (PER)	8
Nicholas Dusard (JAM)	4
Sergio García (ECU)	3
Terrence Jennings (USA)	9
Idulio Islas (MEX)	14
Ángel Mora (CUB)	7
Franco Ríos (BOL)	2
Jhohanny Jean (DOM)	3

Semifinals
Peter López (PER)	5
Terrence Jennings (USA)	4
Idulio Islas (MEX)	4
Jhohanny Jean (DOM)	1

Final
Peter López (PER)
Idulio Islas (MEX)	WD
3rd place
Terrence Jennings (USA)	7
Jhohanny Jean (DOM)	3

=== −80 kg ===
20 November

Round of 16
Lenn Hypolite (TRI)	11
Stuardo Solórzano (GUA)	5
Ángel Román (PUR)	7
Carlos Ruano (ESA)	6
Yair Medina (COL)	16
Fronzie Charles (GRN)	5
Miguel Ferrera (HON)	11
Stuart Cilbert (ARU)	10

Quarterfinals
Sébastien Michaud (CAN)	10
Lenn Hypolite (TRI)	4
Ángel Román (PUR)	5
Steven López (USA)	6
Carlos Vásquez (VEN)	6
Yair Medina (COL)	4
Miguel Ferrera (HON)	5
Sebastián Crismanich (ARG)	11

Semifinals
Sébastien Michaud (CAN)	0
Steven López (USA)	3
Carlos Vásquez (VEN)	3
Sebastián Crismanich (ARG)	5

Final
Steven López (USA)
Sebastián Crismanich (ARG)	WD
3rd place
Sébastien Michaud (CAN)	5
Carlos Vásquez (VEN)	1

=== +80 kg ===
19 November

Quarterfinals
François Coulombe-Fortier (CAN)	5
Kristopher Moitland (CRC)	1
Kenneth Edwards (JAM)	12
David Rajjab (GUY)	0
Juan Díaz (VEN)	WD
Christian Ocampo (PER)
~~Tudor Sanon (HAI)~~
Robelis Despaigne (CUB)	DQ

Semifinals
François Coulombe-Fortier (CAN)	8
Kenneth Edwards (JAM)	3
Juan Díaz (VEN)
Robelis Despaigne (CUB)	WD

Final
François Coulombe-Fortier (CAN)
Robelis Despaigne (CUB)	WD
3rd place
Kenneth Edwards (JAM)	10
Juan Díaz (VEN)	3

== Women ==
=== −49 kg ===
18 November

Round of 16
Jannet Alegría (MEX)	7
Pamela Peralta (ECU)	6
~~Janesky Solís (NCA)~~
Aischal van der Linde (ARU)	DQ
Carola López (ARG)	2
Katherine Reyes (VEN)	1
Cyrlesse Hall (JAM)	5
Julissa Diez Canseco (PER)	15
Katia Arakaki (BRA)	3
Ivett Gonda (CAN)	2
Elizabeth Zamora (GUA)	11
Lianne Muller (IOA)	4
Andrea Franco (BOL)	2
Victoria Álvarez (CHI)	15
Andrea Erazo (HON)	0
Carolena Carstens (PAN)	12

Quarterfinals
Jannet Alegría (MEX)	7
Aischal van der Linde (ARU)	3
Carola López (ARG)	10
Julissa Diez Canseco (PER)	9
Katia Arakaki (BRA)	5
Elizabeth Zamora (GUA)	6
Victoria Álvarez (CHI)	1
Carolena Carstens (PAN)	13

Semifinals
Jannet Alegría (MEX)	7
Carola López (ARG)	4
Elizabeth Zamora (GUA)	6
Carolena Carstens (PAN)	2

Final
Jannet Alegría (MEX)	5
Elizabeth Zamora (GUA)	6
3rd place
Carola López (ARG)	8
Carolena Carstens (PAN)	7

=== −57 kg ===
19 November

Round of 16
Yuleizy Arguedas (CRC)	3
Yeny Contreras (CHI)	6
Elizabeth Alvarado (PER)	8
Christina Carstens (PAN)	3
Mariana Fuentes (BOL)	0
Diana López (USA)	13
Adanys Cordero (VEN)	2
Nidia Muñoz (CUB)	8

Quarterfinals
Laura Vásquez (ESA)	1
Yeny Contreras (CHI)	2
Elizabeth Alvarado (PER)	4
Disnansi Polanco (DOM)	9
Euda Carías (GUA)	2
Diana López (USA)	8
Nidia Muñoz (CUB)	3
Doris Patiño (COL)	2

Semifinals
Yeny Contreras (CHI)	5
Disnansi Polanco (DOM)	3
Diana López (USA)	2
Nidia Muñoz (CUB)	11

Final
Yeny Contreras (CHI)	1
Nidia Muñoz (CUB)	6
3rd place
Disnansi Polanco (DOM)	2
Diana López (USA)	3

=== −67 kg ===
20 November

Quarterfinals
Katherine Alvarado (CRC)	8
Dayana Folleco (ECU)	4
Asunción Ocasio (PUR)	5
Andrea St. Bernard (GRN)	6

Semifinals
Karine Sergerie (CAN)	9
Katherine Alvarado (CRC)	4
Andrea St. Bernard (GRN)	6
Paige McPherson (USA)	10

Final
Karine Sergerie (CAN)	7
Paige McPherson (USA)	5
3rd place
Katherine Alvarado (CRC)	8
Andrea St. Bernard (GRN)	11

=== +67 kg ===
20 November

Quarterfinals
Sandra Vanegas (COL)	7
Deysy Montes de Oca (DOM)	11
Nikki Martínez (PUR)	1
Glenhis Hernández (CUB)	7
Keyla Ávila (HON)	7
Natália Falavigna (BRA)	11

Semifinals
María Espinoza (MEX)	7
Deysy Montes de Oca (DOM)	6
Glenhis Hernández (CUB)	3
Natália Falavigna (BRA)	4

Final
María Espinoza (MEX)
Natália Falavigna (BRA)	WD
3rd place
Deysy Montes de Oca (DOM)	3
Glenhis Hernández (CUB)	5
