= 2012 European Taekwondo Olympic Qualification Tournament =

The 2012 European Qualification Tournament for London Olympic Games was held in Kazan, Russia from January 27 to January 29, 2012. Each country may enter maximum 2 male and 2 female divisions with only one in each division and the first three ranked athletes per weight division qualify their NOCs a place each for Olympic Games.

== Qualification summary ==
NOC	Men				Women				Total
NOC	−58kg	−68kg	−80kg	+80kg	−49kg	−57kg	−67kg	+67kg	Total
Armenia			X						1
Finland						X			1
France						X			1
Germany					X		X		2
Italy				X					1
Netherlands			X						1
Poland		X							1
Russia	X				X				2
Serbia		X				X		X	3
Slovenia				X			X	X	3
Spain	X		X		X				3
Sweden	X								1
Turkey				X			X		2
Ukraine		X						X	2
Total: 14 NOCs	3	3	3	3	3	3	3	3	24

== Men ==
=== −58 kg ===
27 January

Round of 16
Jermaine James (SUI)	5
Haykaz Samvelyan (ARM)	6
Philip Reyes (DEN)	6
Andrei Rotaru (MDA)	7
Liran Malachi (ISR)	2
Stipe Jarloni (CRO)	9
Aleksey Denisenko (RUS)	14
Bogdan Bodnar (UKR)	7
Salaheddine Bensaleh (BEL)
Levent Tuncat (GER)	WD
Norbert Székely (HUN)	5
Uno Sanli (SWE)	6

Quarterfinals
Joel González (ESP)	9
Haykaz Samvelyan (ARM)	6
Andrei Rotaru (MDA)	11
Stipe Jarloni (CRO)	5
Aleksey Denisenko (RUS)	9
Levent Tuncat (GER)	4
Uno Sanli (SWE)	7
Rui Bragança (POR)	6

Semifinals
Joel González (ESP)	13
Andrei Rotaru (MDA)	6
Aleksey Denisenko (RUS)	8
Uno Sanli (SWE)	3

Final
Joel González (ESP)	3
Aleksey Denisenko (RUS)	4
3rd place
Andrei Rotaru (MDA)	7
Uno Sanli (SWE)	10

=== −68 kg ===
28 January

Round of 32
Xhersi Kurti (ALB)	3–6	Jure Pantar (SLO)
Yehonatan Edelstein (ISR)	4–5	Jan Petter Hammer (NOR)
Manuel Mark (AUT)	11–8	Balša Radunović (MNE)
Tsvetolyub Iliev (BUL)	12–14	Hryhorii Husarov (UKR)
Boris Lieskovský (SVK)	6–7	Viktor Jankovský (CZE)

Round of 16
Dennis Bekkers (NED)	3
Jure Pantar (SLO)	3
Robert Amzoiu (ROU)	12
Marko Elenis (BEL)	5
Michał Łoniewski (POL)	6
Jan Petter Hammer (NOR)	5
Manuel Mark (AUT)	5
Vladislav Arventii (MDA)	2
Milad Ashna (SWE)	0
Hryhorii Husarov (UKR)	1
Mário Silva (POR)	4
Juho Kostiainen (FIN)	3
Anatol Kachuk (BLR)	0
Damir Fejzić (SRB)	1
Viktor Jankovský (CZE)	6
Filip Grgić (CRO)	12

Quarterfinals
Dennis Bekkers (NED)	12
Robert Amzoiu (ROU)	3
Michał Łoniewski (POL)	9
Manuel Mark (AUT)	6
Hryhorii Husarov (UKR)	3
Mário Silva (POR)	2
Damir Fejzić (SRB)	6
Filip Grgić (CRO)	3

Semifinals
Dennis Bekkers (NED)	7
Michał Łoniewski (POL)	8
Hryhorii Husarov (UKR)	1
Damir Fejzić (SRB)	3

Final
Michał Łoniewski (POL)	4
Damir Fejzić (SRB)	8
3rd place
Dennis Bekkers (NED)	2
Hryhorii Husarov (UKR)	6

=== −80 kg ===
29 January

Round of 32
Bobby Enright (IRL)	13–5	Angelos Panayiotou (CYP)

Round of 16
Nicolás García (ESP)	5
Bobby Enright (IRL)	3
Piotr Paziński (POL)	5
Amir Katana (BIH)	1
Arman Yeremyan (ARM)	7
Tomáš Hrdina (CZE)	1
Shota Gochiashvili (GEO)	0
Alberto Celestrin (GER)	5
Nikolaos Tzellos (GRE)	11
Eugen Micu (ROU)	2
~~Flamur Zuberi (SUI)~~
Eirik Nilssen Bratli (NOR)	DQ
Stojan Rabijac (SRB)	4
Vitali Kolas (BLR)	3
Tommy Mollet (NED)	5
Mamedy Doucara (FRA)	4

Quarterfinals
Nicolás García (ESP)	8
Piotr Paziński (POL)	6
Arman Yeremyan (ARM)	6
Alberto Celestrin (GER)	3
Nikolaos Tzellos (GRE)	0
Eirik Nilssen Bratli (NOR)	1
Stojan Rabijac (SRB)	4
Tommy Mollet (NED)	8

Semifinals
Nicolás García (ESP)	6
Arman Yeremyan (ARM)	7
Eirik Nilssen Bratli (NOR)	1
Tommy Mollet (NED)	9

Final
Arman Yeremyan (ARM)	WD
Tommy Mollet (NED)
3rd place
Nicolás García (ESP)	10
Eirik Nilssen Bratli (NOR)	3

=== +80 kg ===
28 January

Round of 16
Balázs Tóth (HUN)	5
Ioseb Osidze (GEO)	1
Christoph Decker (AUT)	10
Andreas Stylianou (CYP)	7
Mufid Isaković (BIH)	7
Zakaria Asidah (DEN)	10
Teemu Heino (FIN)	1
Ivan Trajkovič (SLO)	7
Tomáš Kališka (SVK)	0
Pascal Gentil (FRA)	12

Quarterfinals
Carlo Molfetta (ITA)	11
Balázs Tóth (HUN)	5
Christoph Decker (AUT)	11
Zakaria Asidah (DEN)	10
Tavakkul Bayramov (AZE)	2
Ivan Trajkovič (SLO)	7
Pascal Gentil (FRA)	6
Bahri Tanrıkulu (TUR)	7

Semifinals
Carlo Molfetta (ITA)	5
Christoph Decker (AUT)	2
Ivan Trajkovič (SLO)	4
Bahri Tanrıkulu (TUR)	5

Final
Carlo Molfetta (ITA)
Bahri Tanrıkulu (TUR)	WD
3rd place
Christoph Decker (AUT)	8
Ivan Trajkovič (SLO)	9

== Women ==
=== −49 kg ===
27 January

Round of 16
Rukiye Yıldırım (TUR)	4
Christina Schönegger (AUT)	2
Ganna Soroka (UKR)	7
Stavroulla Iosifaki (CYP)	3
Federica Mastrantoni (ITA)	1
Barbara Ducz (HUN)	4
~~Nino Beridze (GEO)~~
Sümeyye Manz (GER)	DQ
Kristina Kim (RUS)	7
Sandra Christensen (DEN)	0
Hanna Zajc (SWE)	0
Jennifer Hurley (IRL)	1
Iliyana Eneva (BUL)	13
Anouk Doria (MON)	3
Anna Mirkin (ISR)	0
Brigitte Yagüe (ESP)	10

Quarterfinals
Rukiye Yıldırım (TUR)	3
Ganna Soroka (UKR)	4
Barbara Ducz (HUN)	3
Sümeyye Manz (GER)	8
Kristina Kim (RUS)	6
Jennifer Hurley (IRL)	0
Iliyana Eneva (BUL)	0
Brigitte Yagüe (ESP)	12

Semifinals
Ganna Soroka (UKR)	2
Sümeyye Manz (GER)	7
Kristina Kim (RUS)	7
Brigitte Yagüe (ESP)	8

Final
Sümeyye Manz (GER)	3
Brigitte Yagüe (ESP)	5
3rd place
Ganna Soroka (UKR)	4
Kristina Kim (RUS)	8

=== −57 kg ===
28 January

Round of 32
Nikolina Kursar (NOR)	5–6	Suvi Mikkonen (FIN)
Sonya McConnell (IRL)	2–9	Gunay Aghakishiyeva (AZE)

Round of 16
Bat-El Gatterer (ISR)	7
Suvi Mikkonen (FIN)	9
Darya Zubovich (BLR)	5
Aleksandra Uścińska (POL)	2
Manuela Bezzola (SUI)	1
Despina Pilavaki (CYP)	6
Tanya Stafanova (BUL)	0
Deborah Louz (NED)	4
Veronica Calabrese (ITA)	1
Dragana Gladović (SRB)	2
Michaela Pinkavová (CZE)	6
Malina Mihaila (ROU)	12
Antonela Marijan (BIH)	1
Edina Kotsis (HUN)	9
Gunay Aghakishiyeva (AZE)	6
Marlène Harnois (FRA)	15

Quarterfinals
Suvi Mikkonen (FIN)	8
Darya Zubovich (BLR)	7
Despina Pilavaki (CYP)	0
Deborah Louz (NED)	3
Dragana Gladović (SRB)	10
Malina Mihaila (ROU)	6
Edina Kotsis (HUN)	5
Marlène Harnois (FRA)	7

Semifinals
Suvi Mikkonen (FIN)	6
Deborah Louz (NED)	3
Dragana Gladović (SRB)	4
Marlène Harnois (FRA)	3

Final
Suvi Mikkonen (FIN)
Dragana Gladović (SRB)	WD
3rd place
Deborah Louz (NED)	4
Marlène Harnois (FRA)	5

=== −67 kg ===
29 January

Round of 16
Reshmie Oogink (NED)	9
Iana Gagnidze (GEO)	1
Katarzyna Wieczorek (POL)	3
Elisavet Mystakidou (GRE)	7
Christine Schmit (LUX)	2
Viktoryia Belanouskaya (BLR)	9
Iulia Latus (MDA)	1
Franka Anić (SLO)	8
Emina Ortaš (BIH)	2
Simona Hradilová (CZE)	7

Quarterfinals
Helena Fromm (GER)	11
Reshmie Oogink (NED)	8
Elisavet Mystakidou (GRE)	0
Viktoryia Belanouskaya (BLR)	1
Nina Kläy (SUI)	2
Franka Anić (SLO)	12
Simona Hradilová (CZE)	0
Nur Tatar (TUR)	10

Semifinals
Helena Fromm (GER)	14
Viktoryia Belanouskaya (BLR)	1
Franka Anić (SLO)	2
Nur Tatar (TUR)	11

Final
Helena Fromm (GER)	1
Nur Tatar (TUR)	5
3rd place
Viktoryia Belanouskaya (BLR)	8
Franka Anić (SLO)	10

=== +67 kg ===
29 January

Quarterfinals
Rosana Simón (ESP)	6
Saina Savage (FIN)	5
Edines Kurtovic (AUT)	3
Milica Mandić (SRB)	10
Tina Røe Skaar (NOR)	3
Maryna Konieva (UKR)	8
Kyriaki Kouvari (GRE)	3
Nuša Rajher (SLO)	5

Semifinals
Rosana Simón (ESP)	3
Milica Mandić (SRB)	5
Maryna Konieva (UKR)	11
Nuša Rajher (SLO)	7

Final
Milica Mandić (SRB)	5
Maryna Konieva (UKR)	8
3rd place
Rosana Simón (ESP)	7
Nuša Rajher (SLO)	12
