= Leona Winter =

French drag queen

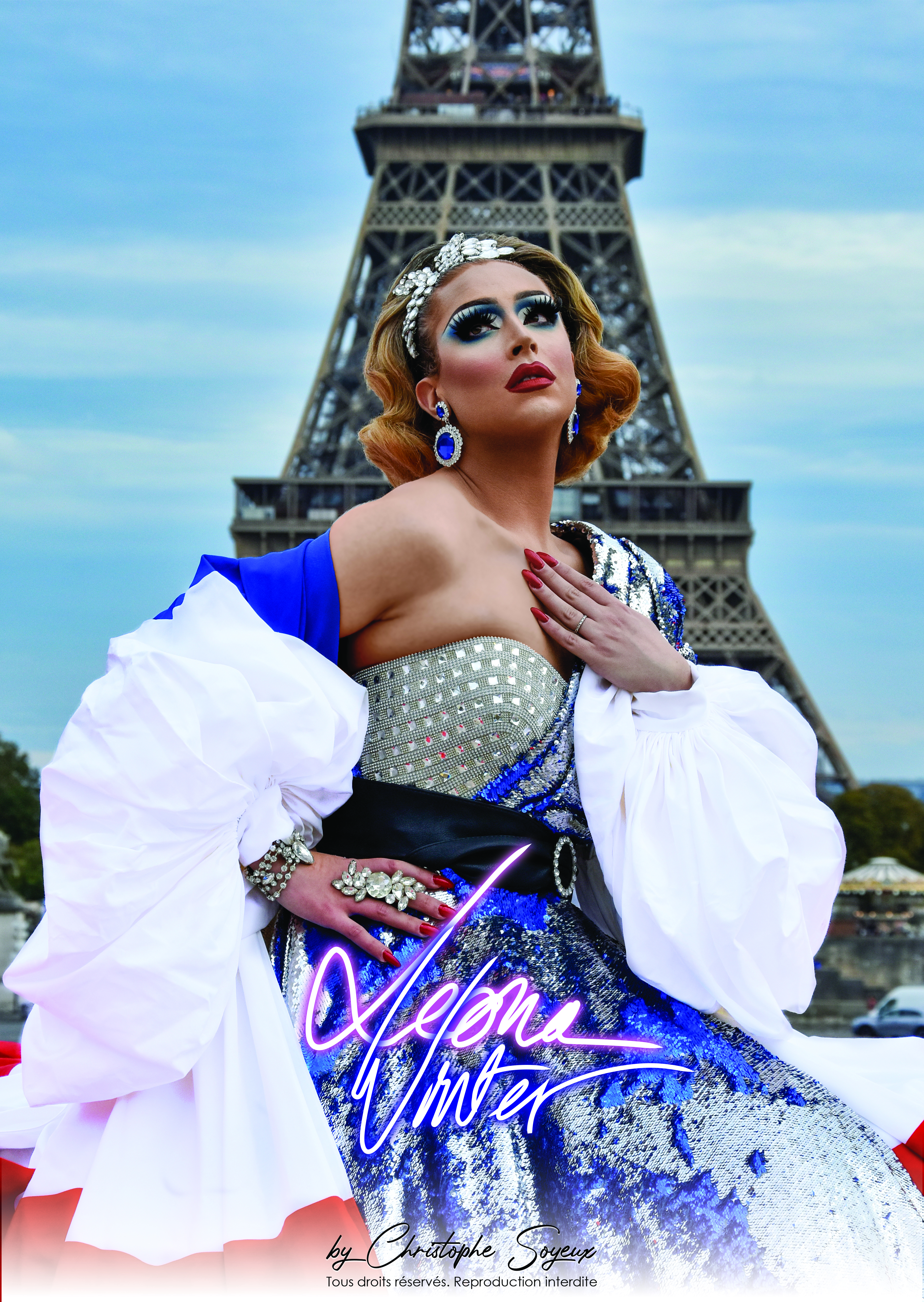
- 2021 photo shoot by Christophe Soyeux
- Born: Rémy Solé; March 20, 1995 (age 31); Céret, Pyrénées-Orientales, Occitania, France
- Occupations: Drag queen, singer
- Years active: 2014-present
- Predecessor: Luz Violeta
- Website: http://www.leonawinter.fr/

Leona Winter (previously known as Miss Leona) is the stage name of Rémy Solé, a French drag queen, best known for winning the second season of the Chilean reality show The Switch Drag Race, the Chilean version of RuPaul's Drag Race and being a contestant on the third season of Drag Race France.

== Early life ==
Solé was born in Ceret, south of France, and is of Spanish heritage. He started taking dance classes when he was eight, and singing classes when he was nine at Arles-sur-Tech where his family is from. He started to take theater classes when he was twelve, and started doing drag at seventeen. He resided in Barcelona before participating in The Switch.

== Career ==
In 2017, Leona Winter was the winner of the Miss Continental prelim pageant Miss Europe Continental in 2017. She was the winner of the Miss Latina Continental prelim in 2018.

Leona Winter appeared as one of fifteen contestants for the second season of The Switch in March 2018. She was announced the winner of the season on July 16, 2018, after beating Pavel Arámbula, Sofía Camará and Gia Gunn.

Winter participated in the eighth season of the French version of The Voice on March 2, 2019, and joined the team of singer Jenifer and went as far as the semi-finals.

On February 3, 2020, Leona Winter appeared as Rémy Solé in the cast of the twelfth season of Les Anges which took place in Hong Kong.

=== Queen of the Universe ===
In November 2021, she were announced as one of fourteen contestants on the debut season of Queen of the Universe, an international drag queen singing competition, and a spin-off of RuPaul's Drag Race.

Queen of the Universe season 1 performances and results
Week #	Theme	Song choice	Original artist	Order #	Result
1	This Is Me	"Non, je ne regrette rien"	Édith Piaf	7	Advanced
2	Turn Back Time	"The Winner Takes It All"	ABBA	2	Bottom 3
3	Duets	"Friends Forever" (with La Voix)	N/A	3	Survival Sing-Off
3	Survival Sing-Off	"The Edge of Glory"	Lady Gaga	2	Eliminated

In 2024 Leona Winter was announced as one of the contestants on the third season of Drag Race France, making her the first participant of a previous season of Drag Race to compete on an original season of another franchise.

== Personal life ==
Solé is married to Lorenzo Werner.

== Filmography ==
=== Television ===
Year	Title	Role	Notes	Ref.
2018	The Switch Drag Race (season 2)	Herself/Contestant	Winner	
2019	The Voice (season 8)	Herself/Contestant		
2020	Les Anges (season 12)	Herself/Contestant		
2021	Queen of the Universe	Herself/Contestant	6th place	
2024	Drag Race France (season 3)	Herself/Contestant	3rd/4th place	
