= 2009 World Taekwondo Championships – Men's flyweight =

Taekwondo competition

Men's flyweight at the 2009 World Championships
- Venue: Ballerup Super Arena
- Dates: 15 October 2009
- Competitors: 76 from 76 nations

Medalists
gold medal	Joel González	Spain
silver medal	Damián Villa	Mexico
bronze medal	Sayed Hasan Rezai	Afghanistan
bronze medal	Mauro Crismanich	Argentina

The Men's flyweight competition was the lightest class featured at the 2009 World Taekwondo Championships, and was held at the Ballerup Super Arena in Copenhagen, Denmark on 15 October.

Flyweights were limited to a maximum of 58 kilograms in body mass. Joel González from Spain won the gold medal after beating Damián Villa in the final.

== Results ==
Legend

- DQ — Won by disqualification

=== Finals ===
Quarterfinals		Semifinals		Final
Damián Villa (MEX)	9
Husam Suleiman (JOR)	6	Damián Villa (MEX)	5
Stipe Jarloni (CRO)	4	Sayed Hasan Rezai (AFG)	2
Sayed Hasan Rezai (AFG)	10			Damián Villa (MEX)	8
Mauro Crismanich (ARG)	7			Joel González (ESP)	11
Márcio Wenceslau (BRA)	4	Mauro Crismanich (ARG)	3
Mario Leal (VEN)	2	Joel González (ESP)	4
Joel González (ESP)	8

=== Top half ===
==== Section 1 ====
Round of 128
Tihomir Vasilev (BUL)	5
Nattapong Tewawetchapong (THA)	4

Round of 64
Gabriel Mercedes (DOM)	5
Tihomir Vasilev (BUL)	2
Carlos Erazo (HON)	4
Tabti Massinissa (ALG)	3
Rustamjon Pulatov (UZB)	2
Maree Thabaya (PLE)	0
Nguyễn Quang Huy (VIE)	9
Damián Villa (MEX)	13

Round of 32
Gabriel Mercedes (DOM)	8
Carlos Erazo (HON)	1
Rustamjon Pulatov (UZB)	2
Damián Villa (MEX)	10

Round of 16
Gabriel Mercedes (DOM)	6
Damián Villa (MEX)	11

==== Section 2 ====
Round of 128
Charalampos Panagiotis (GRE)	4
Rusfredy Tokan Petrus (MAS)	4
Tameem Al-Kubati (YEM)	4
Jocelyn Addison (CAN)	3

Round of 64
Husam Suleiman (JOR)	5
Rusfredy Tokan Petrus (MAS)	4
Hasnain Hussain (NOR)	10
Norbert Nema (HUN)	1
~~Norbert Mutamera (ZIM)~~
Antonis Kyriakou (CYP)	DQ
Tameem Al-Kubati (YEM)	4
Tamer Bayoumi (EGY)	6

Round of 32
Husam Suleiman (JOR)	5
Hasnain Hussain (NOR)	4
Antonis Kyriakou (CYP)	4
Tamer Bayoumi (EGY)	4

Round of 16
Husam Suleiman (JOR)	4
Antonis Kyriakou (CYP)	3

==== Section 3 ====
Round of 128
Stipe Jarloni (CRO)	7
Esteban Chango (ECU)	4
Gabriele Crisafulli (ITA)	DQ
~~Abdullah Al-Mansour (KUW)~~

Round of 64
Pascal Nikani (CIV)	6
Stipe Jarloni (CRO)	10
Elnur Amanov (AZE)	1
Nikola Raičević (MNE)	2
Philip Reyes (DEN)	9
Sven Lorrimer (GUY)	3
Gabriele Crisafulli (ITA)	DQ
~~Alfonso Martínez (BIZ)~~

Round of 32
Stipe Jarloni (CRO)	5
Nikola Raičević (MNE)	2
Philip Reyes (DEN)	1
Gabriele Crisafulli (ITA)	0

Round of 16
Stipe Jarloni (CRO)	7
Philip Reyes (DEN)	6

==== Section 4 ====
Round of 128
Hadi Karam (LIB)	3
Arnold Torres (CHI)	10

Round of 64
Aslan Batykulov (KAZ)	5
Aliaksandr Ustsinau (BLR)	3
Avin Maharaj (TRI)	3
Sayed Hasan Rezai (AFG)	20
Phouthavong Outhasak (LAO)	DQ
~~Sirak Hugos (ETH)~~
Arnold Torres (CHI)	4
Ninoslav Babić (SRB)	3

Round of 32
Aslan Batykulov (KAZ)	1
Sayed Hasan Rezai (AFG)	3
Phouthavong Outhasak (LAO)	10
Arnold Torres (CHI)	3

Round of 16
Sayed Hasan Rezai (AFG)	4
Phouthavong Outhasak (LAO)	2

=== Bottom half ===
==== Section 5 ====
Round of 128
Uno Sanli (SWE)	6
Gylan Al Atroushi (AUS)	5

Round of 64
Pedro Póvoa (POR)	4
Uno Sanli (SWE)	1
Zhang Yue (CHN)	0
Kim Du-san (KOR)	13
Wu Yu Feng (RSA)	DQ
~~Yuval Buchbut (ISR)~~
Fırat Pozan (TUR)	4
Mauro Crismanich (ARG)	5

Round of 32
Pedro Póvoa (POR)	5
Kim Du-san (KOR)	4
Wu Yu Feng (RSA)	0
Mauro Crismanich (ARG)	4

Round of 16
Pedro Póvoa (POR)	6
Mauro Crismanich (ARG)	7

==== Section 6 ====
Round of 128
Miguel Lasso (PAN)	2
David Calabro (BEL)	7
Tseng Chun-chieh (TPE)	7
Rafael Castro (CRC)	4

Round of 64
Márcio Wenceslau (BRA)	3
David Calabro (BEL)	1
Shami Sadygov (UKR)	5
Abdallah Matar (QAT)	0
Nikola Oroz (BIH)	7
Sakumar Basnet (NEP)	4
Tseng Chun-chieh (TPE)	3
Ababacar Ndiaye (SEN)	5

Round of 32
Márcio Wenceslau (BRA)	5
Shami Sadygov (UKR)	1
Nikola Oroz (BIH)	3
Ababacar Ndiaye (SEN)	5

Round of 16
Márcio Wenceslau (BRA)	5
Ababacar Ndiaye (SEN)	1

==== Section 7 ====
Round of 128
~~Dickson Wamwiri (KEN)~~
Hadfi Abdelmajid (MAR)	DQ
~~Mohamed Salem Tlish (LBA)~~
Kevin Fernald (SUR)	DQ

Round of 64
Levent Tuncat (GER)	8
Hadfi Abdelmajid (MAR)	2
~~Ali Suliman (SUD)~~
Arnaud Sangue (FRA)	DQ
Mario Leal (VEN)	11
Cédric Botalatala (COD)	4
Kevin Fernald (SUR)	4
Vasily Soblakov (RUS)	23

Round of 32
Levent Tuncat (GER)	2
Arnaud Sangue (FRA)	4
Mario Leal (VEN)	2
Vasily Soblakov (RUS)	1

Round of 16
Arnaud Sangue (FRA)	0
Mario Leal (VEN)	4

==== Section 8 ====
Round of 128
Nicole Mapilisan (PHI)	DQ
~~Naskhidin Vorisov (TJK)~~

Round of 64
James Howe (USA)	7
Mayko Votta (URU)	3
Mehdi Ahmadi (IRI)	6
Tyrone Robinson (GBR)	5
~~Nabeel Lami (IRQ)~~
Dügreegiin Lkhagvadorj (MGL)	DQ
Nicole Mapilisan (PHI)	1
Joel González (ESP)	13

Round of 32
James Howe (USA)	11
Mehdi Ahmadi (IRI)	5
Dügreegiin Lkhagvadorj (MGL)	0
Joel González (ESP)	11

Round of 16
James Howe (USA)	3
Joel González (ESP)	11
