= The Switch Drag Race season 2 =

The Switch Drag Race
- Season 2
- Promotional poster for season two
- Hosted by: Karla Constant
- Judges: Íngrid Cruz; Juan Pablo González; Óscar Mediavilla
- No. of contestants: 15
- Winner: Miss Leona
- Runners-up: Gia Gunn; Pavel Arámbula; Sofía Camará
- No. of episodes: 31

Release
- Original network: MEGA (Chile); WOW Presents Plus (International)
- Original release: 25 March – 15 July 2018

Season chronology
- ← Previous; Season 1

The second season of The Switch Drag Race began airing on 25 March 2018 on the MEGA and WOW Presents Plus's streaming service. It ran for thirty-one episodes.

The winner of second series of The Switch Drag Race was Miss Leona, with Gia Gunn, Pavel Arámbula and Sofía Camará as the runner-up.

== Challenges ==
Each episode, with the guidance of the six celebrity coaches, the contestants compete in the following challenges;

- Leaders Challenge: In this first test, each contestant from the Chilean group gets paired together with a contestant from the opposing group of "foreigners" to form duos. Together, they must impersonate a celebrity à la Season 1's Artistic Challenge. The duo that succeeds earned immunity and the power of leadership over both respective groups.
- Artistic Challenge: In this second test, the remaining contestants compete within their respective teams (one team consisting of the Chileans and the other consisting of the "foreigners") in a performance-based Artistic Challenge, similar to that of Season 1. Both groups compete in one Imitation Challenge each. The lowest performing contestant gets nominated by the judges to be a duelist in the Extreme Imitation Duel.
- Extreme Imitation Duel: The two lowest scoring performers in each of the teams' Artistic Challenges go up against each other in an extreme, rapid-paced Imitation challenge, in which they must transform into famous pop singers and perform a number within a given time frame, with the assistance of their respective team leaders. The loser of this duel effectively sends their entire team to the Elimination Gala.
- Nomination Mirror: The safe team will each nominate someone from the losing team to go straight to the Elimination Duel. The contestant with the most votes will not be able to participate in the Elimination Gala.
- Elimination Gala (Singing Challenge): The team whose member lost the previous duel must compete against each other in a singing gala à la Season 1, where their performances are scored from 1 to 7 by each judge, with the lowest scoring performer being sent to the Elimination Duel.
- Elimination Duel: The lowest scored performer in the Elimination Gala is put up against the contestant nominated during the Nomination Mirror round. They both perform a live song of their choosing and the judges vote by majority who shall be eliminated.

== Contestants ==
Ages, names, and cities stated are at time of filming.

Contestants of The Switch Drag Race season 2 and their backgrounds
Contestant	Age	Team	Hometown	Season 1 placement	Outcome
Miss Leona (Note: Now Leona Winter, she is referred to as Miss Leona on the show.)	21	Foreign	Paris, France	—N/a	Winner
Gia Gunn	26	Foreign	Chicago, United States (Note: Although living in Chicago at the time, Gia Gunn represented Japan on the show.)	—N/a	Runners-up
Pavel Arámbula	32	Foreign	Mexico City, Mexico	—N/a	Runners-up
Sofía Camará	26	Chilean	Entre Ríos, Argentina	4th place	Runners-up
Fernanda Brown	25	Chilean	Santiago, Chile	9th place	5th place
Diva Houston	38	Foreign	São Paulo, Brazil (Note: Although living in Spain at the time, Diva Houston represented Brazil on the show.)	—N/a	6th place (Note: Diva Houston originally placed eleventh before re-entering the competition.)
Rochelle Mon Chéri	25	Foreign	San Juan, Puerto Rico	—N/a	7th place (Note: Rochelle Mon Chéri originally placed ninth before re-entering the competition.)
Kandy Ho	30	Foreign	New York City, United States (Note: Although living in New York at the time, Kandy Ho represented Puerto Rico on the show.)	—N/a	8th place
Luz Violeta	29	Chilean	Santiago, Chile	Winner	9th place (Note: Luz Violeta quit the competition before the elimination duel.)
Arianda Sodi	29	Chilean	Santiago, Chile	7th place	10th place (Note: Arianda Sodi originally placed thirteenth before re-entering the competition.)
Laura Bell	27	Chilean	Santiago, Chile	8th place	11th place
Marie Laveau	25	Foreign	San Juan, Puerto Rico	—N/a	12th place
Luna di Mauri	49	Chilean	Santiago, Chile	Runner-up	13th place
Francisca del Solar	28	Chilean	Santiago, Chile	—N/a	14th place
Fransiska Tólika (Note: Now Pakita, she is referred to as Fransiska Tólika on the show.)	24	Foreign	Sevilla, Spain	—N/a	15th place

== Contestant progress ==
Legend:

Miss Leona won The Switch Drag Race season 2.
Gia Gunn, Pavel Arámbula and Sofía Camará were the runners-up.
IMM (Immunity) indicates that the contestant won the immunity.
WIN indicates that the contestant won the Extreme Imitation Duel and saved their team.
ADV (Advanced) indicates that the contestant won the pass to the next semifinal or finale.
SAFE indicates that the contestant was safe in that week.
DUEL indicates that the contestant was up for elimination.
ELIM (Eliminated) indicates that the contestant was eliminated.
QUIT indicates that Luz Violeta quit the competition.
Guest indicates that the contestant returned as a guest.

Contestants progress with placements in each episode
Contestant	Week (Note: Every week, up until week 10, was composed of three episodes.)													
Contestant	1	2	3	4	5	6	7	8	9	10	11 (Note: Weeks 11, 12 and 13 were part of the same episode, episode 30.)	12	13	14
Miss Leona	SAFE	SAFE	SAFE	SAFE	SAFE	DUEL	IMM	SAFE	SAFE	SAFE	ADV	SAFE	ADV	Winner
Gia Gunn	IMM	IMM	SAFE	IMM	SAFE	WIN	SAFE	SAFE	IMM	DUEL	ADV	ADV	ADV	Runner-up
Pavel Arámbula	SAFE	SAFE	SAFE	SAFE	DUEL	WIN	SAFE	WIN	SAFE	SAFE	SAFE	DUEL	SAFE	Runner-up
Sofía Camará	SAFE	IMM	DUEL	IMM	SAFE	IMM	DUEL	SAFE	SAFE	IMM	DUEL	SAFE	SAFE	Runner-up
Fernanda Brown	IMM	SAFE	SAFE	SAFE	SAFE	SAFE	WIN	DUEL	SAFE	IMM	ADV	SAFE	SAFE	Eliminated
Diva Houston	SAFE	SAFE	WIN	ELIM				SAFE	IMM	SAFE	SAFE	SAFE	ELIM	Guest
Rochelle Mon Chéri						IMM	ELIM	SAFE	SAFE	SAFE	SAFE	ELIM		Guest
Kandy Ho	SAFE	WIN	SAFE	DUEL	SAFE	SAFE	SAFE	IMM	WIN	SAFE	ELIM			Guest
Luz Violeta	WIN	SAFE	IMM	WIN	IMM	SAFE	IMM	SAFE	DUEL	QUIT				
Arianda Sodi	SAFE	ELIM						IMM	ELIM					Guest
Laura Bell	SAFE	DUEL	SAFE	SAFE	DUEL	SAFE	SAFE	ELIM						Guest
Marie Laveau	DUEL	SAFE	IMM	DUEL	IMM	ELIM								
Luna di Mauri	SAFE	SAFE	DUEL	SAFE	ELIM									
Francisca del Solar		SAFE	ELIM											Guest
Fransiska Tólika	ELIM													

== Episodes ==
No. overall	No. in season	Title	Original release date
25	1	"Episode 1"	March 24, 2018
26	2	"Episode 2"	April 1, 2018
27	3	"Episode 3"	April 5, 2018
28	4	"Episode 4"	April 8, 2018
29	5	"Episode 5"	April 15, 2018
30	6	"Episode 6"	April 22, 2018
31	7	"Episode 7"	April 29, 2018
32	8	"Episode 8"	April 29, 2018
33	9	"Episode 9"	May 13, 2018
34	10	"Episode 10"	May 16, 2018
35	11	"Episode 11"	May 17, 2018
36	12	"Episode 12"	May 18, 2018
37	13	"Episode 13"	May 23, 2018
38	14	"Episode 14"	May 24, 2018
39	15	"Episode 15"	May 25, 2018
40	16	"Episode 16"	May 30, 2018
41	17	"Episode 17"	May 31, 2018
42	18	"Episode 18"	June 1, 2018
43	19	"Episode 19"	June 6, 2018
44	20	"Episode 20"	June 7, 2018
45	21	"Episode 21"	June 8, 2018
46	22	"Episode 22"	June 13, 2018
47	23	"Episode 23"	June 14, 2018
48	24	"Episode 24"	June 15, 2018
49	25	"Episode 25"	June 19, 2018
50	26	"Episode 26"	June 20, 2018
51	27	"Episode 27"	June 21, 2018
52	28	"Episode 28"	June 24, 2018
53	29	"Episode 29"	July 1, 2018
54	30	"Episode 30"	July 8, 2018
55	31	"Episode 31"	July 15, 2018
