= Dylan Chellamootoo =

French taekwondo practitioner

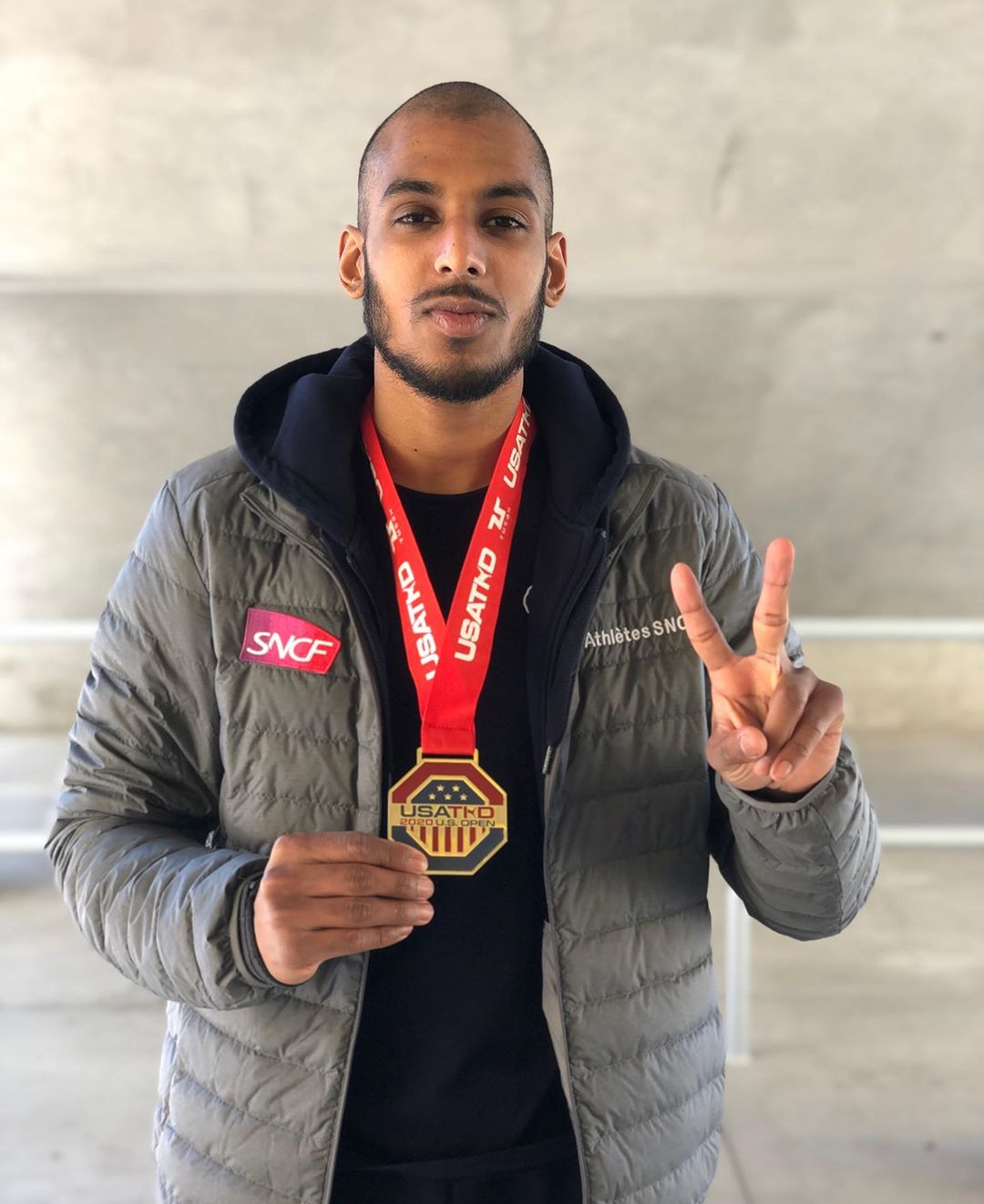
- Dylan Chellamootoo in 2020

Personal information
- Born: 22 January 1995 (age 31)

Sport
- Country: France
- Sport: Taekwondo
Medal record
Men's taekwondo
Representing France
European Championships
Bronze medal – third place	2014 Baku	−58 kg
Summer Universiade
Bronze medal – third place	2019 Naples	–63 kg
Military World Games
Silver medal – second place	2019 Wuhan	–63 kg

Dylan Chellamootoo (born 22 January 1995) is a French taekwondo practitioner. He won one of the bronze medals in the –63 kg event at the 2019 Summer Universiade held in Naples, Italy.

== Career ==
In 2013, Chellamootoo competed in the men's flyweight at the World Taekwondo Championships in Puebla, Mexico. He was eliminated in his third match by Damián Villa of Mexico. A year later, he won one of the bronze medals in the −58 kg event at the 2014 European Taekwondo Championships held in Baku, Azerbaijan.

Chellamootoo represented France at the 2015 European Games in Baku, Azerbaijan in the men's 58 kg event without winning a medal. He was eliminated in his first match by Max Cater of Great Britain. The following year, he competed at the 2016 European Taekwondo Olympic Qualification Tournament hoping to qualify for the 2016 Summer Olympics in Rio de Janeiro, Brazil. He won his first match but he was then eliminated in his next match by Ron Atias of Israel. In 2018, he competed in the men's 68 kg event at the Mediterranean Games without winning a medal. He was eliminated from the competition in his second match, against Hakan Reçber of Turkey.

In 2019, Chellamootoo competed in the men's bantamweight event at the World Taekwondo Championships in Manchester, United Kingdom where he was eliminated in his first match by Korai Murakami of Japan. At the 2019 Military World Games held in Wuhan, China, he won the silver medal in the –63 kg event.

Chellamootoo competed at the 2021 European Taekwondo Olympic Qualification Tournament held in Sofia, Bulgaria hoping to qualify for the 2020 Summer Olympics in Tokyo, Japan.

== Achievements ==
Year	Event	Location	Place
2014	European Taekwondo Championships	Baku, Azerbaijan	3rd
2019	Military World Games	Wuhan, China	2nd
