= Crismanich =

Crismanich is a surname. Notable people with the surname include:

- Mauro Crismanich (born 1984), Argentinian taekwondo athlete
- Sebastián Crismanich (born 1986), Argentinian taekwondo athlete, brother of Mauro
