= 2013 World Taekwondo Championships – Men's flyweight =

Taekwondo competition

Men's flyweight at the 2013 World Championships
- Venue: Exhibition Center of Puebla
- Dates: 15 July 2013
- Competitors: 70 from 69 nations

Medalists
| gold medal | Cha Tae-moon | South Korea |
| silver medal | Hadi Mostaan | Iran |
| bronze medal | Damián Villa | Mexico |
| bronze medal | Guilherme Dias | Brazil |

The Men's flyweight is a competition featured at the 2013 World Taekwondo Championships, and was held at the Exhibition Center of Puebla in Puebla, Mexico on July 15. Flyweights were limited to a maximum of 58 kilograms in body mass.

== Results ==
Legend

- DQ — Won by disqualification
- K — Won by knockout
- P — Won by punitive declaration
- R — Won by referee stop contest

=== Finals ===
| Quarterfinals | | Semifinals | | Final |
| Cha Tae-moon (KOR) | 25 |
| Ruslan Poiseev (RUS) | 12 | Cha Tae-moon (KOR) | 10 |
| Damián Villa (MEX) | 6 | Damián Villa (MEX) | 3 |
| Huang Cheng-ching (TPE) | 5 | | | Cha Tae-moon (KOR) | 9 |
| Hadi Mostaan (IRI) | 12 | | | Hadi Mostaan (IRI) | 8 |
| Heiner Oviedo (CRC) | 9 | Hadi Mostaan (IRI) | 5 |
| Guilherme Dias (BRA) | 6 | Guilherme Dias (BRA) | 4 |
| Ignacio Morales (CHI) | 5 |

=== Top half ===
==== Section 1 ====
Round of 128
~~Emmanuel Gamor (GHA)~~
Renso Mendoza (BOL) | DQ

Round of 64
Pen-ek Karaket (THA) | 13
Renso Mendoza (BOL) | 1
Juan Flores (PUR) | 5^{P}
Mohamed-Deq Abdulle (SOM) | 4
Cha Tae-moon (KOR) | 8^{P}
Usman Sulaiman (NGR) | 0
Dương Quang Huy (VIE) | 13
Desmond Allen (NZL) | 3

Round of 32
Pen-ek Karaket (THA) | 8^{R}
Juan Flores (PUR) | 3
Cha Tae-moon (KOR) | 19
Dương Quang Huy (VIE) | 4

Round of 16
Pen-ek Karaket (THA) | 13
Cha Tae-moon (KOR) | 17

==== Section 2 ====
Round of 128

Round of 64
Ruslan Poiseev (RUS) | DQ
~~Teble Mbairabeal (CHA)~~
Ranjan Shrestha (NEP) | 4
Placide Bagabo (RWA) | 3
Vincent Foster (CAN) | 8
Mohamed Ali Melghagh (MAR) | 7
Salia Ouattara (GAB) | 1
James Howe (USA) | 15

Round of 32
Ruslan Poiseev (RUS) | 13
Ranjan Shrestha (NEP) | 5
Vincent Foster (CAN) | 8
James Howe (USA) | 9

Round of 16
Ruslan Poiseev (RUS) | 6
James Howe (USA) | 2

==== Section 3 ====
Round of 128
Mohamed Dhair (QAT) | 10
Moti Lugasi (ISR) | 9

Round of 64
Damián Villa (MEX) | 8
Mohamed Dhair (QAT) | 5
~~Seydou Niang (MLI)~~
Arlindo Semedo (CPV) | DQ
Abdullah Al-Farhoud (KUW) | 16^{K}
Ng Chi Hou (MAC) | 6
Romain Trolliet (ALG) | 1
Dylan Chellamootoo (FRA) | 9

Round of 32
Damián Villa (MEX) | 9
Arlindo Semedo (CPV) | 1
Abdullah Al-Farhoud (KUW) | 2
Dylan Chellamootoo (FRA) | 15

Round of 16
Damián Villa (MEX) | 8
Dylan Chellamootoo (FRA) | 3

==== Section 4 ====
Round of 128
José Luis Méndez (ESP) | 3
Huang Cheng-ching (TPE) | 14

Round of 64
Stipe Jarloni (CRO) | 9
Mehdi Amhand (SUI) | 8
Ng Ming Wei (SIN) | 1
Haykaz Samvelyan (ARM) | 15
Khosbayaryn Bilgüün (MGL) | 12
Kinley Penjor (BHU) | 0
Huang Cheng-ching (TPE) | 4
Safwan Khalil (AUS) | 3

Round of 32
Stipe Jarloni (CRO) | 11
Haykaz Samvelyan (ARM) | 2
Khosbayaryn Bilgüün (MGL) | 1
Huang Cheng-ching (TPE) | 11

Round of 16
Stipe Jarloni (CRO) | 2
Huang Cheng-ching (TPE) | 6

=== Bottom half ===
==== Section 5 ====
Round of 128
Mohammad Khalifah (JOR) | 8
Zhalgas Bekkassymov (KAZ) | 2

Round of 64
Rui Bragança (POR) | 6
Mohammad Khalifah (JOR) | 1
Bogdan Bodnar (UKR) | 4
Zhao Shuai (CHN) | 5
Miloš Gladović (SRB) | 5
Elmer Flores (HON) | 6
Magomedyassin Ibragimov (AZE) | 0
Hadi Mostaan (IRI) | 1

Round of 32
Rui Bragança (POR) | 4
Zhao Shuai (CHN) | 8
Elmer Flores (HON) | 3
Hadi Mostaan (IRI) | 11

Round of 16
Zhao Shuai (CHN) | 6
Hadi Mostaan (IRI) | 7

==== Section 6 ====
Round of 128
Domenico Gemma (ITA) | 12
Ahmed Al-Subaihawi (IRQ) | 9

Round of 64
Uno Sanli (SWE) | 6
John Jairo Maduro (ARU) | 0
Georgios Petropoulos (GRE) | 5
Serkan Tok (TUR) | 17
Ong Stevanus (INA) | 9
Meisam Rafiei (ISL) | 11
Domenico Gemma (ITA) | 5
Heiner Oviedo (CRC) | 9

Round of 32
Uno Sanli (SWE) | 9
Serkan Tok (TUR) | 8
Meisam Rafiei (ISL) | 3
Heiner Oviedo (CRC) | 4

Round of 16
Uno Sanli (SWE) | 5
Heiner Oviedo (CRC) | 13

==== Section 7 ====
Round of 128

Round of 64
Guilherme Dias (BRA) | 10
Antonis Kyriakou (CYP) | 2
~~Ali Aseeri (KSA)~~
Keno Mendoza (PHI) | DQ
Hadi Karam (LIB) | 12
Wasiu Tadjou (CIV) | 4
Lucas Guzmán (ARG) | 9
Yuma Yamada (JPN) | 2

Round of 32
Guilherme Dias (BRA) | 11
Keno Mendoza (PHI) | 9
Hadi Karam (LIB) | 1
Lucas Guzmán (ARG) | 15

Round of 16
Guilherme Dias (BRA) | 6
Lucas Guzmán (ARG) | 4

==== Section 8 ====
Round of 128
Ignacio Morales (CHI) | 19
Lesego Maponyane (RSA) | 7

Round of 64
El-Said Shawky (EGY) | 12
Gajendra Parihar (WTF) | 5
Gustavo Machado (VEN) | 4
César Martínez (DOM) | 11
~~Levent Tuncat (GER)~~ | DQ
~~Siaosi Veatupu (TGA)~~ | DQ
Ignacio Morales (CHI) | 13
Óscar Muñoz (COL) | 7

Round of 32
El-Said Shawky (EGY) | 7
César Martínez (DOM) | 6
Bye
Ignacio Morales (CHI)

Round of 16
El-Said Shawky (EGY) | 2
Ignacio Morales (CHI) | 9
