= Gia Gunn =

American drag performer (born 1990)

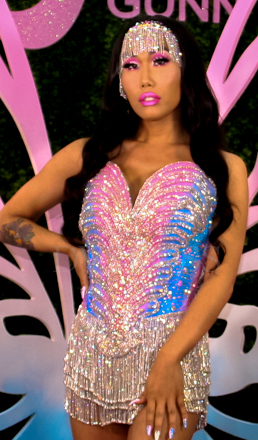
- Gia Gunn in 2019

Background information
- Also known as: Gia Keitaro Ichikawa
- Born: May 10, 1990 (age 36); Chicago, Illinois, U.S.
- Genre: Drag
- Occupations: Drag queen, musical artist, actress, activist
- Instruments: Vocals

Gia Gunn is the stage name of Japanese-American retired drag performer Gia Keitaro Ichikawa (born May 10, 1990). She is known for competing on the sixth season of RuPaul's Drag Race, the second season of The Switch Drag Race, and RuPaul's Drag Race: All Stars season four.

== Early life ==
Raised in Carpentersville, Illinois, Ichikawa began performing Japanese traditional dance and kabuki in onnagata roles when she was five years old. She graduated from Barrington High School in Barrington, Illinois.

She won the drag pageants Miss Roscoe's 2013 and Miss Diosa 2013. Her drag mother is trans drag performer Aly Gunn. Her last name was inspired by Tim Gunn; Gia Gunn's first name came from Gia Carangi.

== Career ==
=== Drag Race and The Switch ===
Gia Gunn was announced as one of fourteen contestants for the sixth season of RuPaul's Drag Race on February 24, 2014. She covered RuPaul's song "Ladyboy" for RuPaul's album RuPaul Presents: The CoverGurlz to promote the season. On the show, she was known for her voguing, off-the-cuff catchphrases, reads and particular opinions, feminine style of drag, and friendship with fellow contestant Laganja Estranja. Gia Gunn underperformed as Kim Kardashian during the "Snatch Game" challenge, and was eliminated after losing a bottom two lip sync against Estranja to Lisa Lisa & Cult Jam's "Head to Toe," earning her tenth place.

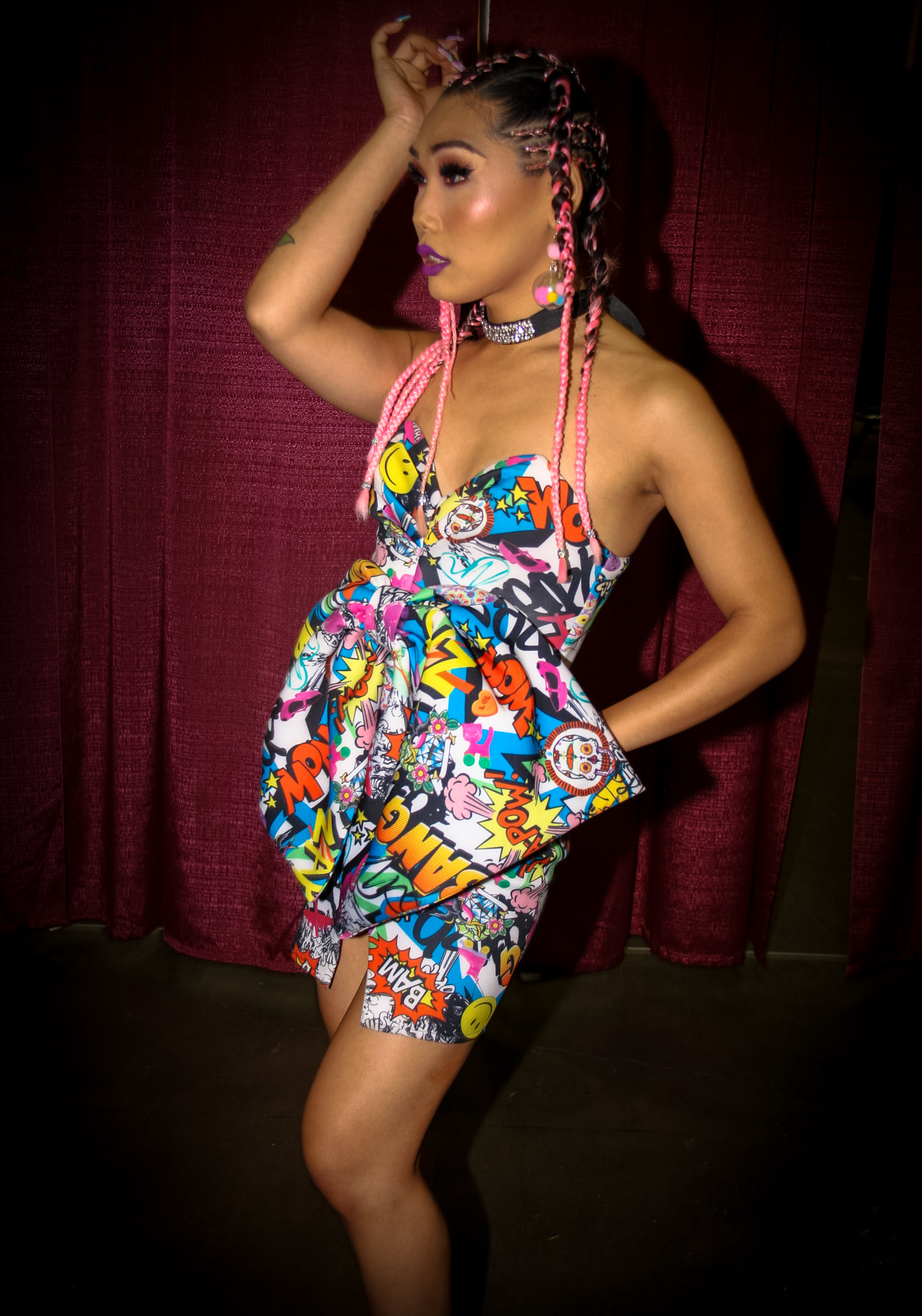
Gia Gunn at RuPaul's DragCon LA, 2017

In 2017, Gia Gunn was announced as a contestant on the second season of The Switch, the Chilean version of Drag Race, alongside Drag Race alumnus Kandy Ho. The series premiered in March 2018, with 15 contestants. Gia Gunn earned ten challenge wins, making her the most-decorated contestant of the season, but lost to Miss Leona.

Gia Gunn was announced as one of ten contestants competing on the fourth season of RuPaul's Drag Race All Stars in 2018. She became the third ever transgender contestant to come out prior to appearing on the show, following Monica Beverly Hillz and Peppermint. However, Gia Gunn was the first trans contestant to compete post-transition during her second season. The show premiered on December 14, 2018, with Gia Gunn eliminated in the third episode after once again underperforming in "Snatch Game" challenge with her Jenny Bui impression. Manila Luzon eliminated her, causing Gia Gunn to place 8th. She had a chance to return in the sixth episode, where the eliminated queens faced off with the queens still in game, but lost a lip sync to Naomi Smalls, eliminating her for good.

After her elimination, Gia Gunn sparked controversy revealing that an altercation between her and RuPaul about transgender drag queens was edited out of show.

=== After Drag Race ===
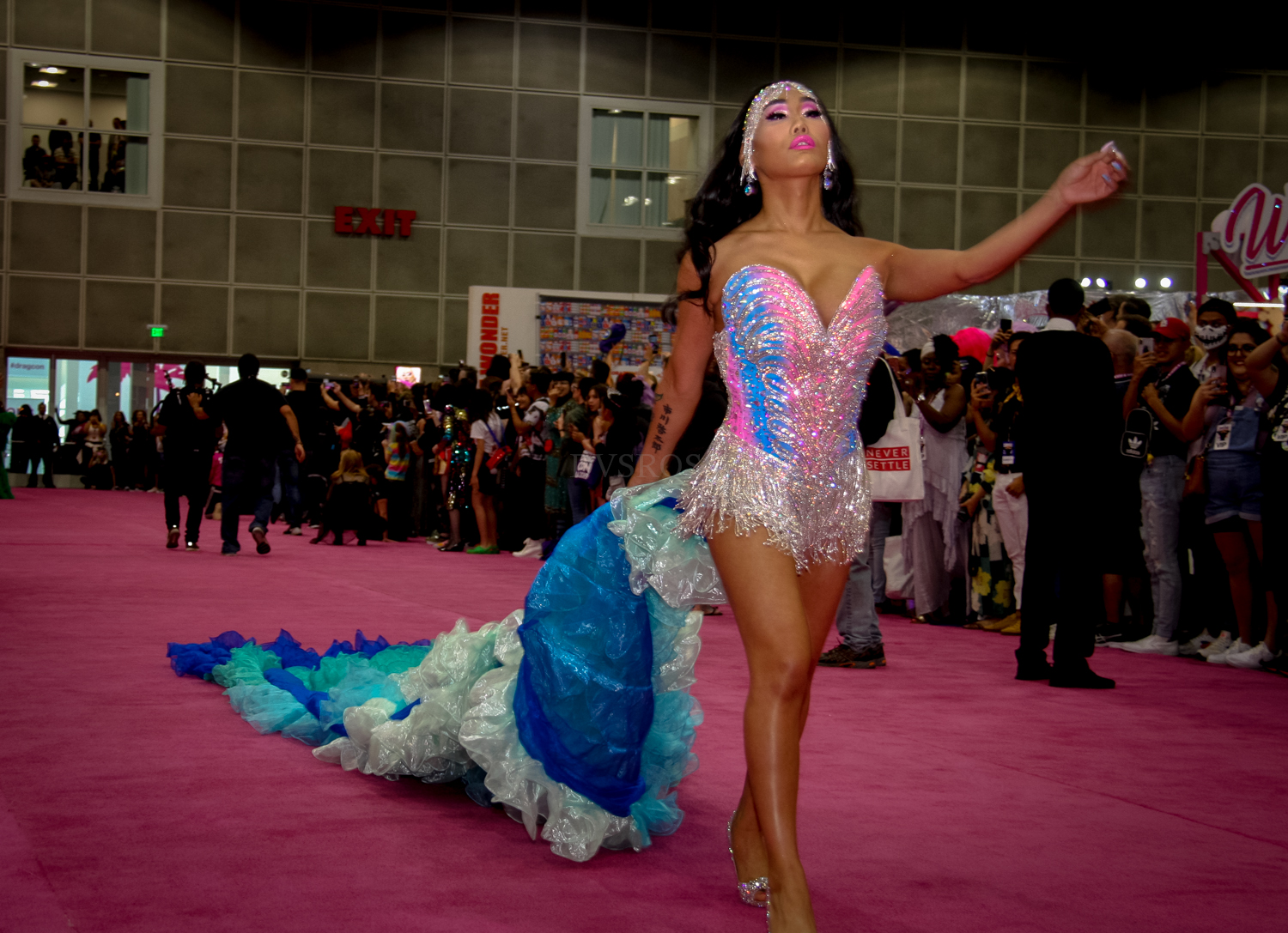
Gia Gunn at RuPaul's DragCon LA in 2019

Gia Gunn walked the runway for MarcoMarco's fall 2017 fashion show with other Drag Race alumni.

On March 31, 2018, Gia Gunn released 30 Days in Transition, a web series on her YouTube channel documenting aspects of her transition as a transgender woman. Shortly thereafter, she was announced to star in the first episode of an internet documentary series by WOWPresents following her life as a trans person and drag queen; the series will be called Follow Me. A teaser was released on June 25, 2018, and features Isis King. With WOW Presents, Gia Gunn played Karrueche Tran's character Virginia in a recap video of the first season of Claws. Gia Gunn also frequently appeared in other WOW Presents productions, including Wait, What?, Besties for Cash, and Fashion Photo RuView. She and Estranja appear both on WOW Presents and at other performances as the duo TeamTooMuch.

=== Music ===
Following her appearance on RuPaul's Drag Race, Gia Gunn released her first solo single "Bring out the Gunnz" on July 31, 2015. In 2016, Gia Gunn was featured on the Alaska's song "Stun" from her album Poundcake. A music video was released on April 24, 2017. Drag Race contestants Mariah Paris Balenciaga, Courtney Act and Willam are featured in the video as well. On August 29, 2018, Gia Gunn's second single "#LaChinaMasLatina" was released, featuring Alaska. Gia Gunn and Estranja appeared in the music video for Danielle Alexa's "Spin in Circles."

== Personal life ==
Ichikawa started taking hormones in 2016, and she publicly came out as a trans woman via Instagram in April 2017. She later had the first name on her birth certificate officially changed to Gia in August. She was one of many Drag Race alumni to criticize RuPaul's views on transgender and bio queens competing on the show in 2018. She started a Gofundme page to cover $30,000 of her transition surgery.

Ichikawa sparked controversy in June 2020, claiming that the COVID-19 pandemic was a hoax, saying in an Instagram Live video, "I think the whole mask thing is f–king ridiculous... I honestly think this whole COVID-19 thing is a hoax." She later tested positive for COVID-19 in July 2021, receiving further backlash from fellow season 6 contestant and winner Bianca Del Rio, as well as season 7 contestant Mrs. Kasha Davis.

Gia Gunn is a member of the drag family The Haus of Edwards, with Alyssa Edwards, Shangela, Plastique Tiara, Laganja Estranja and Vivienne Pinay.

== Filmography ==
=== Television ===
Year	Title	Role	Notes
2014	RuPaul's Drag Race	Herself	Contestant (10th place)
2014	RuPaul's Drag Race: Untucked	Herself	Contestant (10th place)
2018	The Switch Drag Race	Herself	Contestant (runner-up)
2018–19	RuPaul's Drag Race: All Stars	Herself	Contestant (8th place)

=== Music videos ===
Year	Title	Artist
2017	"Stun"	Alaska
2018	"Spin In Circles"	Danielle Alexa
2018	"#LaChinaMasLatina"	Herself
2019	"Not Ok"	Kygo, Chelsea Cutler
2020	"I Can't"	Rigel Gemini
2021	"It's The -- For Me"	Rigel Gemini

=== Web series ===
Year	Title	Role	Notes	Ref.
2014	Transformations	Herself	Guest	
2016-2019	Hey Qween!	Herself	Guest; 2 episodes	
2018	Puff Puff Sessions	Herself	Guest	
2018	Follow Me	Herself	Guest	
2018	Whatcha Packin'	Herself	Guest	
2018	30 Days In Transition	Herself	Host	
2019	The X Change Rate	Herself	Guest, Episode 7	

== Discography ==
=== Singles ===
Year	Title
2015	"Bring out the Gunnz"
2018	"#LaChinaMasLatina"
