= The Switch Drag Race season 1 =

The Switch Drag Race
- Season 1
- Promotional poster for season one
- Hosted by: Karla Constant
- Judges: Íngrid Cruz; Juan Pablo González; Nicole Gaultier; Sebastián Errázuriz
- No. of contestants: 17
- Winner: Luz Violeta
- Runners-up: Stephanie Fox; Luna di Mauri
- Mejor Compañera: Jessica Parker
- No. of episodes: 24

Release
- Original network: MEGA (Chile); WOW Presents Plus (International)
- Original release: 8 October 2015 – 17 January 2016

Season chronology
- Next → Season 2

The first season of The Switch Drag Race began airing on 8 October 2015 on the MEGA and WOW Presents Plus's WOW Presents Plus streaming service. It ran for twenty-four episodes.

The winner of first series of The Switch Drag Race was Luz Violeta, with Stephanie Fox and Luna di Mauri as the runner-up, and Jessica Parker being crowned first Mejor Compañera.

== Challenges ==
Each episode, with the guidance of the four celebrity coaches, the contestants compete in the following challenges;

- Artistic Challenge: In this first test, each contestant has to characterize a TV personality or pop culture icon either on themselves, another contestant, or a guest. This test is judged individually as well as in groups. Depending on the episode, one of two outcomes occur;
  - Immunity from elimination is offered to the highest performer (of the winning group, if applicable) or a nominee is chosen to head directly to the Elimination Duel
  - Or the winning contestants (or team) progresses to the Imitation Challenge to compete for immunity, with the competitors who don't win continuing on to the Singing Challenge.
- Imitation Challenge: In this second test, each contestant has to maintain the characterizations of their character/icon make-over from the previous challenge and add an element of acting, singing, dancing, or lip-sync performance. Immunity and nominations are chosen in the outcome of this challenge as well. In the first episode of Season 1, the weakest performer was eliminated from this challenge by majority vote from the judges.
- Singing Challenge: In this third test, each individual contestant has to sing a song of their own choosing live in front of the judges and a studio audience. At the end of each presentation, each member of the judges panel assigns a point score ranging from 1 to 7, based on the quality of each contestant's performance. After the first score is given, the first contestant must sit in the "Elimination chair" until another performer replaces them by having a lower score than them. If the next performer receives a higher score than the person in the chair, they are safe from elimination and proceed backstage to prepare for the next episode. Ultimately, the contestant with the lowest score is nominated to go up for elimination in the Elimination Duel.
- Elimination Duels: In this last test, the lowest scored performer in the episode's Singing Challenge is put up against the performer nominated from one of the other challenges. They both perform a live song of their choosing and the judges vote by majority who will be eliminated from The Switch. Typically, contestants that aren't competing that episode are shown watching the Elimination Duel backstage in the make-up room alongside singing coach Patricia Maldonado Aravena. In the event of a tie in the voting, Juan Pablo González acts as the president of the judges panel and casts a final vote for the elimination. The eliminated contestant is typically honored with a montage of their run on the show and is ultimately shown writing a farewell with a tube of lipstick on a mirror in the briefing room à la the American Drag Race.

=== Finale ===
- Quarter-finals: The final ten contestants are split up to compete in two episodes (19 and 20). One immunity is given the winner of the Imitation Challenge in each episode, allowing them to progress to the Semi-finals episode. The other four contestants performing in a Singing Challenge with the judges announcing which two contestants will continue on to the Finale via majority vote. The two remaining contestants perform in an Elimination Duel to fight for the fourth spot in the two-part Finale episode.
- Semi-finals: The eight contestants are again split up into groups of two to compete in two episodes (21 and 22), with one contestant being eliminated each episode. The contestants must all compete in an Imitation challenge and a Singing Challenge, with the judges all assigning point scores for each contestant overall. The contestant with the highest score in each episode automatically advance to compete as finalists. The contestant with the lowest score in both episodes are eliminated from the competition, with the two remaining contestants being safe. In the third episode (23) of the Semi-finals, the four previously safe contestants perform the challenges once more, with the highest scored performer advancing to the finale; the lowest scored performer being eliminated; and the two remaining "safe" performers being nominated to duel against each other in the final episode. For dramatic effect, one judge is chosen for each episode in the Semi-finals to withhold their scores for the contestants until the end of the episode, where it is revealed who gets to progress to the finale and who gets eliminated based on the final tally.
  - Secret Votes:
    - Episode 21: Nicole Gaultier
    - Episode 22: Juan Pablo González
    - Episode 23: Sebastián Errázuriz
- Finale: The two previously nominated contestants from the third round of the Semi-finals go head-to-head in an Elimination Duel, with one contestant ultimately being eliminated from the competition and the other advancing as a finalist. Following this, the four finalists perform individually in a Singing Challenge one last time to determine the outcome of the competition. After eliminating the weakest performer by the judges' vote, the winner of The Switch is crowned the best "transformista", or drag entertainer, of Chile and the runners-up are named.

The winner of The Switch receives a grand prize of CLP$10,000,000 (approximately USD$15,700) and a one-year supply of products and accessories from AnyHair, a Spanish company by way of Chile that specializes in hair extensions, wigs, and hairpieces.

== Contestants ==
Ages, names, and cities stated are at time of filming.

Contestants of The Switch Drag Race season 1 and their backgrounds
Contestant	Age	Hometown	Outcome
Luz Violeta	28	Santiago, Chile	Winner
Luna di Mauri	48	Santiago, Chile	Runners-up
Stephanie Fox	33	Antofagasta, Chile	Runners-up
Sofía Camará	25	Entre Ríos, Argentina	4th place (Note: Sofía Camará originally placed sixteenth before re-entering the competition.)
Yoyi (Note: La Yoyi is referred to as Yoyi on the show.)	41	Santiago, Chile	5th place
Rubí (Note: Rubí Blonde is referred to as Rubí on the show.)	28	Montevideo, Uruguay	6th place (Note: Rubí originally placed fourteenth before re-entering the competition.)
Arianda Sodi	28	Santiago, Chile	7th place (Note: Arianda Sodi originally placed tenth before re-entering the competition.)
Laura Bell	26	Santiago, Chile	8th place (Note: Laura Bell originally placed ninth before re-entering the competition.)
Fernanda Brown	24	Santiago, Chile	9th place (Note: Fernanda Brown was voted La Más Pretenciosa.)
Jessica Parker	24	Antofagasta, Chile	10th place (Note: Jessica Parker was voted Mejor Compañera.)
Paulette Palmery	38	Antofagasta, Chile	11th place
Nery Lefferti	24	Santiago, Chile	12th place (Note: Nery Lefferti originally placed fifteenth before re-entering the competition.)
Yume Hime	27	Antofagasta, Chile	13th place
Kristina Kox	22	Santiago, Chile	14th place
Francisca Thompson	21	Santiago, Chile	15th place
Elizabeth San Martín	23	Antofagasta, Chile	16th place (Note: Elizabeth San Martín was voted La Peor Transformista.)
Álvaro Lynch	50	Buenos Aires, Argentina	17th place

== Contestant progress ==
Legend:

Luz Violeta won The Switch Drag Race season 1.
Luna di Mauri and Stephanie Fox were the runners-up.
Jessica Parker was voted Mejor Compañera (MC).
Fernanda Brown was voted La Más Pretenciosa (LMP).
Elizabeth San Martín was voted La Peor Transformista (LPT).
WIN indicates that the contestant won the immunity.
ADV indicates that the contestant advanced to the finale.
IN indicates that the contestant was chosen to re-enter the competition.
SAFE indicates that the contestant was declared safe by the judges.
NOM indicates that the contestant was nominated to compete in the next elimination duel.
DUEL indicates that the contestant was up for elimination.
ELIM (Eliminated) indicates that the contestant was eliminated.
OUT indicates that the contestant returned to win re-entry into the competition, but lost.
Guest indicates that the contestant returned as a guest.

Contestants progress with placements in each episode
Contestant	Episode																							
Contestant	1	2	3	4	5	6	7	8	9	10	11	12	13	14	15	16	17	18	19	20 (Note: On episode 20, Yume Hime was called in to compete for Luna di Mauri while she was ill. Her win counts as Luna di Mauri's.)	21	22	23	24
Luz Violeta	SAFE	SAFE	SAFE	WIN	SAFE	DUEL	WIN	SAFE	WIN	SAFE	SAFE	SAFE	SAFE	DUEL	SAFE	SAFE	SAFE	DUEL	SAFE	SAFE	ADV	SAFE	SAFE	Winner
Luna di Mauri	SAFE	SAFE	SAFE	SAFE	SAFE	SAFE	SAFE	WIN	SAFE	WIN	SAFE	WIN	SAFE	SAFE	SAFE	SAFE	SAFE		SAFE		SAFE	SAFE	NOM	Runner-up
Stephanie Fox	WIN	SAFE	SAFE	SAFE	SAFE	SAFE	SAFE	SAFE	SAFE	SAFE	SAFE	WIN	SAFE	SAFE	WIN	SAFE	SAFE	WIN	DUEL	SAFE	SAFE	ADV	SAFE	Runner-up
Sofía Camará	NOM	ELIM							IN	SAFE	SAFE	SAFE	SAFE	WIN	DUEL	SAFE	SAFE	WIN	SAFE	SAFE	SAFE	SAFE	ADV	Eliminated
Yoyi	SAFE	SAFE	WIN	SAFE	SAFE	SAFE	SAFE	SAFE	SAFE	SAFE	SAFE	SAFE	SAFE	SAFE	SAFE	SAFE	SAFE	SAFE	SAFE	DUEL	SAFE	SAFE	NOM	Eliminated
Rubí									SAFE	SAFE	SAFE	SAFE	SAFE	WIN	ELIM		SAFE	SAFE	SAFE	SAFE	SAFE	SAFE	ELIM	Guest
Arianda Sodi	SAFE	DUEL	WIN	SAFE	SAFE	SAFE	SAFE	ELIM									IN	SAFE	WIN	SAFE	SAFE	ELIM		Guest
Laura Bell	SAFE	SAFE	SAFE	SAFE	SAFE	WIN	SAFE	SAFE	SAFE	SAFE	NOM	DUEL	SAFE	SAFE	SAFE	ELIM	IN	SAFE	SAFE	SAFE	ELIM			Guest
Fernanda Brown	SAFE	WIN	SAFE	WIN	WIN	SAFE	SAFE	SAFE	SAFE	WIN	WIN	SAFE	WIN	SAFE	SAFE	SAFE	WIN	SAFE	SAFE	ELIM				LMP
Jessica Parker									NOM	DUEL	WIN	SAFE	SAFE	SAFE	WIN	SAFE	DUEL	SAFE	ELIM					MC
Paulette Palmery	SAFE	WIN	SAFE	SAFE	SAFE	SAFE	SAFE	SAFE	SAFE	SAFE	SAFE	SAFE	SAFE	SAFE	SAFE	DUEL	SAFE	ELIM						Guest
Nery Lefferti	SAFE	SAFE	SAFE	SAFE	NOM	ELIM											ELIM							Guest
Yume Hime	SAFE	SAFE	SAFE	SAFE	WIN	SAFE	NOM	DUEL	SAFE	SAFE	SAFE	SAFE	NOM	ELIM						WIN				Guest
Kristina Kox	SAFE	SAFE	SAFE	DUEL	SAFE	SAFE	SAFE	SAFE	SAFE	WIN	NOM	ELIM					OUT							Guest
Francisca Thompson									SAFE	ELIM							OUT							Guest
Elizabeth San Martín	SAFE	SAFE	NOM	ELIM													OUT							LPT
Álvaro Lynch	ELIM																							Guest

== Episodes ==
No. overall	No. in season	Title	Original release date
1	1	"Episode 1"	October 8, 2015
2	2	"Episode 2"	October 15, 2015
3	3	"Episode 3"	October 22, 2015
4	4	"Episode 4"	October 25, 2015
5	5	"Episode 5"	October 29, 2015
6	6	"Episode 6"	November 1, 2015
7	7	"Episode 7"	November 5, 2015
8	8	"Elimination"	November 8, 2015
9	9	"Reloaded"	November 12, 2015
10	10	"Drama Queen"	November 15, 2015
11	11	"Runway"	November 19, 2015
12	12	"Comedy"	November 22, 2015
13	13	"Episode 13"	November 26, 2015
14	14	"Episode 14"	November 29, 2015
15	15	"Episode 15"	December 3, 2015
16	16	"Episode 16"	December 6, 2015
17	17	"Episode 17"	December 10, 2015
18	18	"Episode 18"	December 13, 2015
19	19	"Episode 19"	December 17, 2015
20	20	"Episode 20"	December 20, 2015
21	21	"First Semi-Final"	December 27, 2015
22	22	"Second Semi-Final"	January 3, 2016
23	23	"Third Semi-Final"	January 10, 2016
24	24	"Grand Final"	January 17, 2016
