= Taekwondo at the 2014 Pan American Sports Festival =

Taekwondo competition

The taekwondo competition at the 2014 Pan American Sports Festival was held in Puebla, Mexico.

== Medal summary ==
=== Men ===
Event	Gold	Silver	Bronze
Flyweight (~58 kg)	Williams Cortez (VEN)	Osvaldo Llorens (CUB)	Renso Mendoza (BOL)
Flyweight (~58 kg)	Williams Cortez (VEN)	Osvaldo Llorens (CUB)	Heiner Oviedo (CRC)
Featherweight (~68 kg)	Yosbel Pérez (CUB)	Charles Goltara (BRA)	Franco Ríos (BOL)
Featherweight (~68 kg)	Yosbel Pérez (CUB)	Charles Goltara (BRA)	Ruddy Mateo (DOM)
Welterweight (~80 kg)	José Cobas (CUB)	Lucas Ferreira (BRA)	Nerbel Maíz (VEN)
Welterweight (~80 kg)	José Cobas (CUB)	Lucas Ferreira (BRA)	Josue Venegas (CRC)
Middleweight (+80 kg)	Rosbely Despaige (CUB)	Kristopher Moitland (CRC)	

=== Women ===
Event	Gold	Silver	Bronze
Flyweight (~49 kg)	Jamila Tanna (BRA)	Katherin Purzel (PAR)	
Featherweight (~57 kg)	Yamicel Nuñez (CUB)	Josiane de Oliveira (BRA)	Disnansi Polanco (DOM)
Featherweight (~57 kg)	Yamicel Nuñez (CUB)	Josiane de Oliveira (BRA)	Katherinn Reyes (VEN)
Welterweight (~67 kg)	Ana Faria (BRA)	Sthefanie Hernández (PAN)	
Welterweight (+67 kg)	Glenhis Hernández (CUB)	Erica Adriane (BRA)	Katherine Rodríguez (DOM)
