= Rigel Gemini =

Queer musical artist

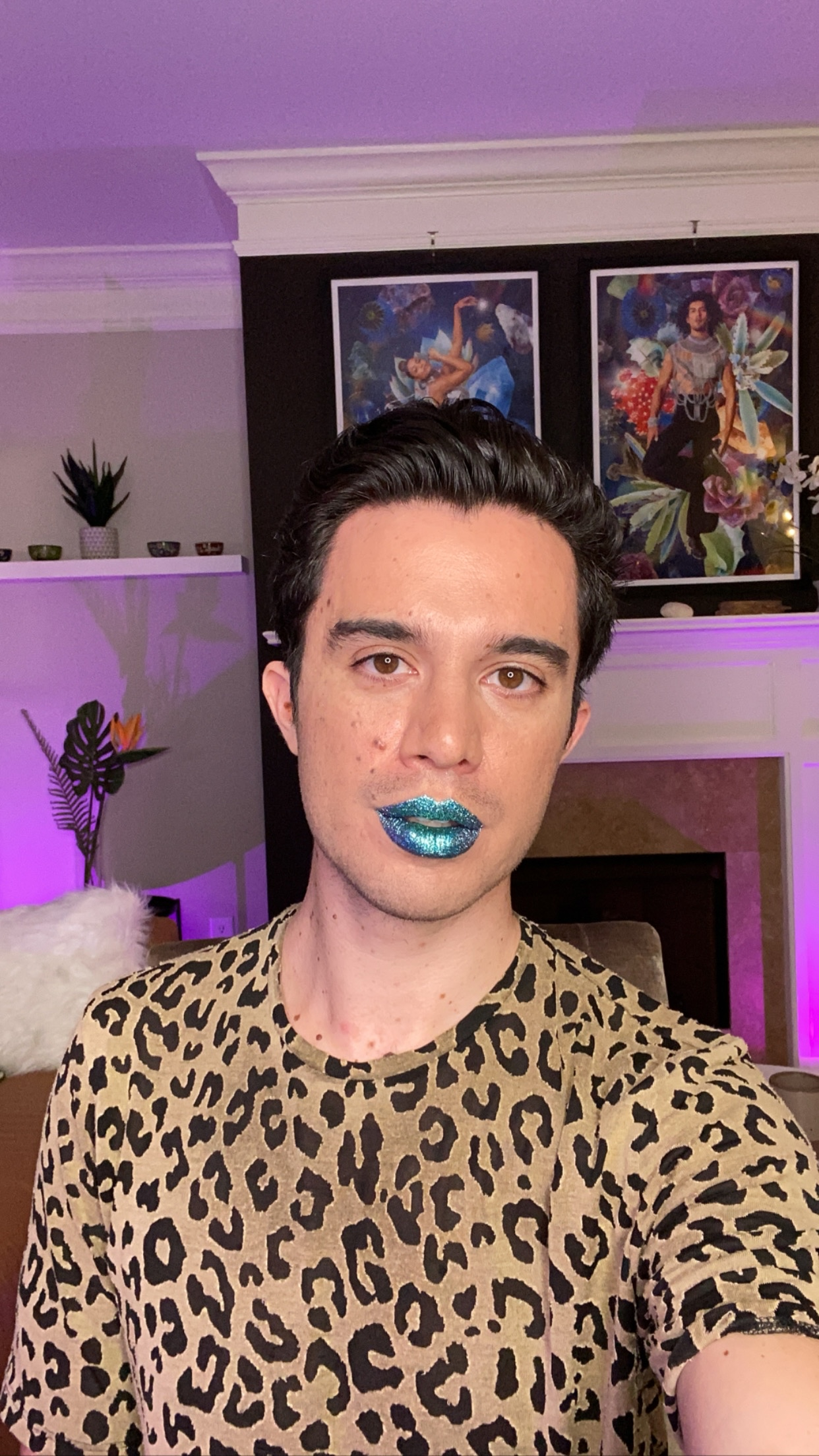
- Born: Rigel Cable; New Hampshire
- Education: Dartmouth College
- Notable work: "I Can't" music video
- Spouse: Cameron Lee
- Website: rigelgemini.com

Rigel Cable, better known by his (Note: Gemini uses he/him and they/them pronouns. This article uses he/him for consistency.) stage name Rigel Gemini, is an American musician known for his songs entitled "I Can't", "It's The -- For Me", "Coffee In My Cup", and "Gorgeois". His music videos have included queer and trans entertainers, including Gia Gunn and Alyssa Edwards in "I Can't", Gia Gunn in "It's The -- For Me", Ts Madison in "Coffee In My Cup, and Plastique Tiara and Heidi N Closet in "Gorgeois". He released his first album "MELT" in 2021. His music video for "I Can't" was removed from YouTube and re-released.

== Career ==
Gemini is a social media content creator on Instagram and YouTube focused on fashion and LGBTQ topics, who also organizes creative events and art shows in Atlanta with his husband Cameron Lee. He is a queer opinion contributor for Adweek and has been outspoken about LGBT activism and social justice. As Rigel Cable, he works in e-commerce and analytics.

== Personal life ==
Gemini was born in New Hampshire and lives in Atlanta. He is of Japanese descent; his mother is half Japanese and was born in Kobe.

Gemini is queer and nonbinary and uses he/him and they/them pronouns.

Gemini went to Dartmouth College and graduated in 2010 and married his husband Cameron Lee in 2015.

== Works ==
- "I Can't"
- "Day & Night" featuring TIAAN
- "Gorgeois" featuring Ocean Kelly
- "Coffee In My Cup"
- "It's The -- For Me" featuring Gia Gunn
