= Guilherme Dias =

Brazilian taekwondo practitioner

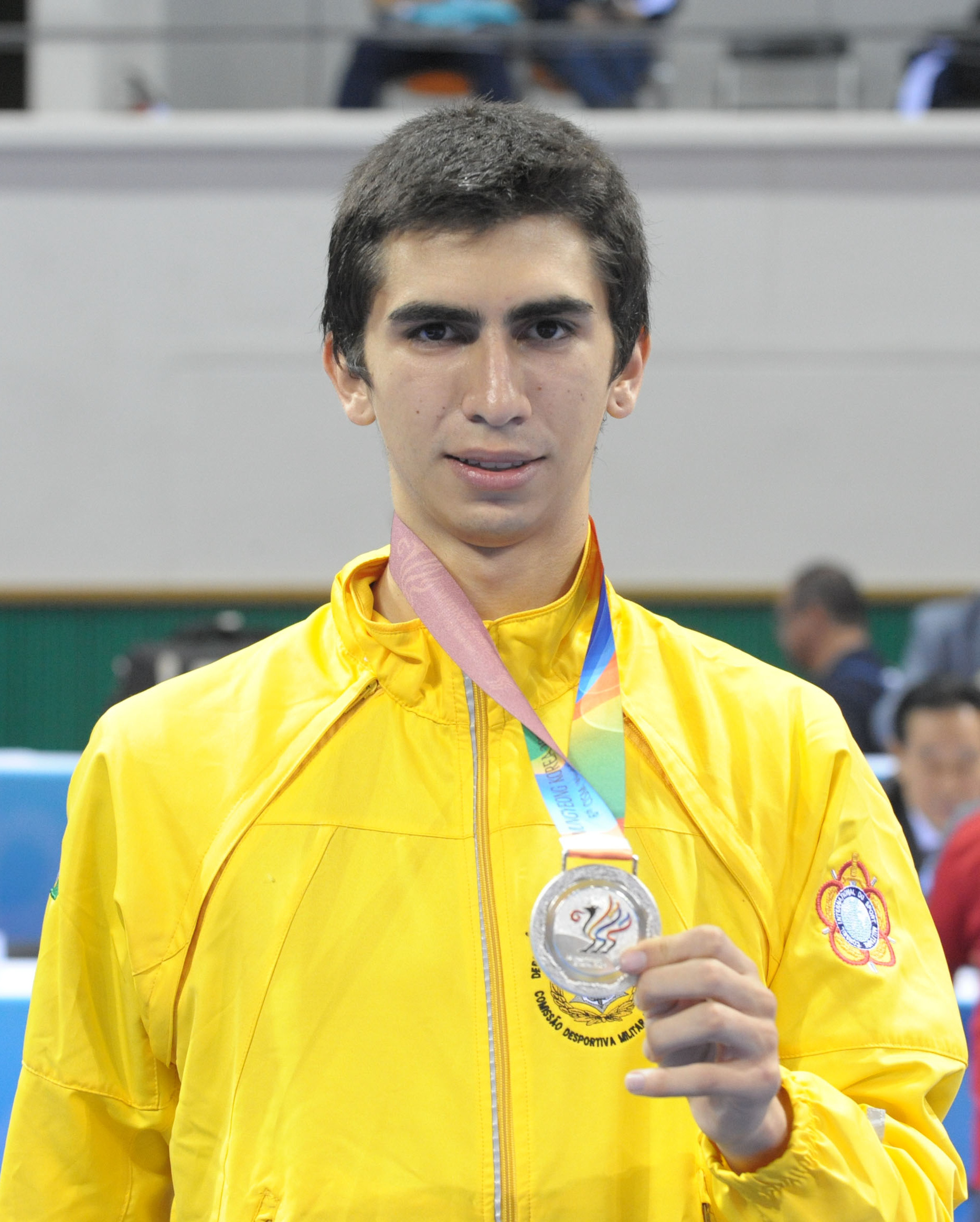
- Dias at the 2015 Military World Games

Personal information
- Born: 27 July 1992 (age 34) Brasília, Distrito Federal, Brazil
- Height: 182 cm (6 ft 0 in)
- Weight: 62 kg (137 lb)

Sport
- Sport: Taekwondo
- Club: Brazilian Navy
Medal record
Representing Brazil
World Championships
Bronze medal – third place	2013 Puebla	-58 kg
Military World Games
Gold medal – first place	2015 Mungyeong	-63 kg

Guilherme Dias Alves (born 27 July 1992) is a taekwondo competitor from Brazil. He won a bronze medal in the 58 kg division at the 2013 World Championships. He also won a gold medal in the 2015 Military World Games in Mungyeong. He also plays at Futerribles Amateur Soccer Team, where he is known as "Atleta"
