= Luz Violeta =

Chilean drag performer and singer

- Born: Sebastián Aguirre
- Occupations: Drag queen, singer, comedian, model, LGBTI+ activist
- Television: The Switch Drag Race
- Website: luzvioletaabc1.cl

Luz Violeta is the stage name of Sebastián Aguirre, a Chilean drag performer and singer, best known for winning the first season of The Switch Drag Race.

== Early life ==
Aguirre is a rape survivor, having been subjected to the traumatic event at a young age.

On The Switch Drag Race, he revealed that at an early age, his father did not accept his sexuality. However, after seeing him on the show and realizing that drag was a valid career, he became more accepting.

== Career ==
Luz Violeta was among the cast of 17 drag queens to compete on the first season of The Switch Drag Race. After four months of competing, she was announced as the winner. She returned to compete in the second season, where she made the decision to leave the competition. In addition to The Switch Drag Race, they have competed in other competition shows, including La Divina Comida and Chilean Talent.

== Personal life ==
Aguirre currently lives in Santiago, Chile. He is a part of a campaign against gender violence with UN Women. In 2016, he survived a stabbing attack.

Aguirre identifies as gay, but has dated women in the past and expressed a willingness to do so again in the future. He maintains an active social media presence on Instagram at @LuzVioletaDrag.

== Filmography ==
=== Television ===
Year	Title	Role	Notes
2014	Talento Chileno	Herself	Contestant
2015–2018	The Switch Drag Race	Herself	Contestant
2016	La Divina Comida	Herself	Contestant

== See also ==
- LGBT in Chile
