= Talitiga Crawley =

Samoan taekwondo practitioner

Personal information
- Nationality: Samoan
- Born: 29 August 1991 (age 34) Moto'otua, Samoa
- Height: 1.82 m (6 ft 0 in) (2012)
- Weight: 82 kg (181 lb) (2012)

Sport
- Country: Samoa
- Sport: Taekwondo
- Event: +67 kg
- Coached by: Kesi O'Neill
Medal record
Women's taekwondo
Representing Samoa
Pacific Games
Silver medal – second place	2011 Nouméa	+73 kg
- Updated on 14 August 2012

Talitiga Crawley (born 29 August 1991 in Moto'otua) is a Samoan taekwondo practitioner. She competed for Samoa at the 2012 Summer Olympics, having qualified for the competition. She studied under her coach Kesi O'Neill.
