= Nicole Gaultier =

Drag performer

- Born: Marcelo Álvarez; Montevideo, Uruguay
- Television: The Switch Drag Race

Nicole Gaultier is the stage name of Marcelo Álvarez, a Uruguayan drag performer who was a judge on The Switch Drag Race. She is from Montevideo, Uruguay.

== Filmography ==
=== Television ===
- The Switch Drag Race
