= Andrea St. Bernard =

Grenadian taekwondo practitioner

Personal information
- Born: 2 October 1979 (age 45); St. George's, Grenada
- Height: 1.75 m (5 ft 9 in)

Sport
- Country: Grenada
- Sport: Taekwondo
- Event: 67kg
- Coached by: Paul Beard
- Updated on 22 July 2012

Andrea St. Bernard (born 2 October 1979 in St. George's, Grenada) is a Grenadian taekwondo competitor.

St. Bernard was born in Grenada but moved to Toronto, Canada, when her parents emigrated during the Grenadian Revolution, and holds dual Canadian and Grenadian citizenship. She studied at Duquesne University in Pittsburgh, Pennsylvania, United States, where she played for the Dukes volleyball team. She attended law school at the University of Toronto and after graduating began working for McMillan LLP as a debt financing associate. She is 1.75 metres (5 ft 9 in) tall and is coached by Paul Beard.

== Taekwondo ==
St. Bernard was introduced to taekwondo during her time at law school by her aunt, who holds a black belt in the sport. She began training at the Young Choung Academy in Toronto.

At the 2009 World Taekwondo Championships in Copenhagen, Denmark, St. Bernard was eliminated in the first round of the women's welterweight event after losing to Sun Ai-chi of Chinese Taipei. At the 2011 World Championships in Gyeongju, South Korea, she was disqualified in her first round bout in the women's welterweight.

St. Bernard qualified for the 2012 Summer Olympics via the 2011 Pan American Taekwondo Olympic Qualification Tournament in Querétaro, Mexico in November 2011. She lost her semifinal bout to Paige McPherson of the United States but earned her position at the Games by beating Costa Rican Katherine Alvarado by a score of 11–8 in the third-place match.

In March 2012, McMillan organised a reception for St. Bernard and matched the US$7,500 of donations she had raised to fund her career. She represented Grenada at the 2012 Summer Olympics in London, United Kingdom, in the women's 67 kg weight class. The event was held on 10 August, at the ExCeL Exhibition Centre. She was the first ever taekwondo competitor for Grenada at an Olympic Games.
