= Kandy Ho =

Puerto Rican drag performer

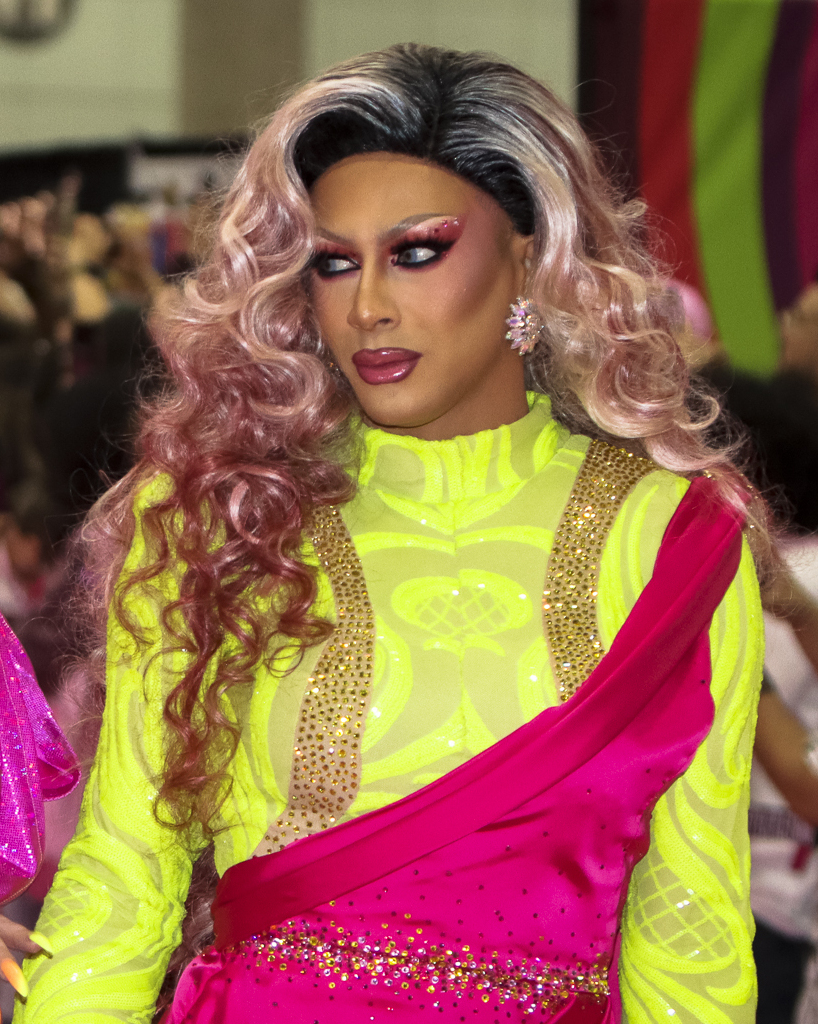
- Kandy Ho at RuPaul's DragCon LA, 2022
- Born: Frank Diaz Jr. September 24, 1987 (age 37); Connecticut, U.S.
- Television: RuPaul's Drag Race (season 7); The Switch Drag Race (season 2)

Frank Diaz Jr. (born September 24, 1987), better known by the stage name Kandy Ho, is a Puerto Rican drag queen and television personality.

== Early life ==
Diaz was born and raised in Connecticut, United States, and moved to Puerto Rico when she was 10 years old. She was raised as a Pentecostal and Baptist.

Before competing on RuPaul's Drag Race, she worked in sales for 8 years. She first performed in drag as a fill-in for a talent show, where she impersonated Madonna, but was hesitant to return to drag until she was asked by friends to fill in as Kimberly Wyatt in a Pussycat Dolls impersonation act for Pride. She was convinced to fill in by her then-boyfriend, and decided to continue pursuing drag afterwards. Her drag name is composed of "Kandy", because she describes herself as sweet and was suggested to her by a friend, as well as "Ho", because she needed something "raunchy" to "spice up" the name and was suggested the name by her then-boyfriend.

== Career ==
Originally from Cayey, Puerto Rico, she rose to prominence on the seventh season of RuPaul's Drag Race in 2015, and later competed on the second season Chilean version of Drag Race, The Switch Drag Race, in 2018, where she represented Puerto Rico. She was accepted onto Drag Race after only auditioning once. During her run on season 7 she was notably critiqued by Michelle Visage for her makeup contouring looking like she had painted on a beard, with Visage's reaction of wagging her finger and saying "no" being turned into a popular GIF.

In 2019 she was ranked by Vulture as one of the most powerful drag queens in America.
