= François Coulombe-Fortier =

Canadian taekwondo practitioner

Personal information
- Nationality: Canadian
- Born: November 15, 1984 (age 41) Quebec City, Canada

Sport
- Sport: Taekwondo
Medal record
Representing Canada
Taekwondo
Pan American Taekwondo Championships
Gold medal – first place	2004 Santo Domingo	+80 kg
Silver medal – second place	2010 Monterrey	+80 kg
Olympic Qualification Tournament
Silver medal – second place	2011 Querétaro	+80 kg
Pan American Games
Bronze medal – third place	2011 Guadalajara	+80 kg

François Coulombe-Fortier (born November 15, 1984) is a Canadian taekwondo practitioner. In 2011 Coulombe-Fortier won a bronze medal at the 2011 Pan American Games and later in the year followed up by winning a silver medal at the Pan American Olympic qualification tournament, and by doing so qualified to compete at the 2012 Summer Olympics. At the 2012 Summer Olympics, he reached the quarter-finals, defeating Gadzhi Umarov in the first round before losing to Daba Modibo Keita in the quarterfinal.

Coulombe-Fortier is also a one time Pan American Championship Champion and has also won numerous medals in world cup events across the globe.
