= Dragana Gladović =

Serbian taekwondo practitioner

Medal record

Women's taekwondo

Representing Serbia

Universiade
Bronze medal – third place	2015 Gwangju	Bantamweight

Dragana Gladović (Serbian Cyrillic: Драгана Гладовић, born 27 July 1992 in Šabac) is a Serbian taekwondo practitioner. At the 2012 Summer Olympics, she competed in the Taekwondo at the 2012 Summer Olympics – Women's 57 kg, but was defeated in the first round.
