= Márcio Wenceslau =

Brazilian taekwondo practitioner

Personal information
- Full name: Márcio Wenceslau Ferreira
- Nationality: Brazil
- Born: 20 March 1980 (age 46) São Paulo, Brazil
- Height: 1.65 m (5 ft 5 in)
- Weight: 58 kg (128 lb)

Sport
- Sport: Taekwondo
- Event: 58 kg
Medal record
Men's taekwondo
Representing Brazil
World Championships
Silver medal – second place	2005 Madrid	Bantamweight
Pan American Games
Silver medal – second place	2007 Rio de Janeiro	58 kg
Bronze medal – third place	2011 Guadalajara	58 kg

Márcio Wenceslau Ferreira (born March 20, 1980, in São Paulo) is a Brazilian taekwondo practitioner. He qualified for the men's flyweight category (58 kg) at the 2008 Summer Olympics in Beijing, when he won a silver medal for his host nation at the 2007 Pan American Games in Rio de Janeiro, losing out to Gabriel Mercedes of the Dominican Republic in the final match. He also added the bronze medal at the 2011 Pan American Games in Guadalajara, Mexico, after being defeated by Mexico's Damian Villa in the semi-final round. He is the brother of Marcel Ferreira, who also competed for the same category at the 2004 Summer Olympics in Athens.

At the 2008 Summer Olympics, Wenceslau defeated Iran's Reza Naderian by hitting a frontal blow in the first preliminary round match, with a score of 2–1. He reached the quarterfinal round, before losing to world champion Juan Antonio Ramos of Spain, by a defensive kick in the first two periods, with a decisive score of 2–3.
