= Hryhorii Husarov =

Ukrainian taekwondo practitioner

Hryhorii Husarov (born September 7, 1993 in Kharkiv) is a Ukrainian taekwondo practitioner. At the 2012 Summer Olympics, he competed in the Men's 68 kg competition, reaching the quarterfinals.
