= Kristina Kim =

Russian taekwondoin (born 1989)

Kristina Kim (born September 4, 1989 in Kyzylorda, Kazakh SSR, Soviet Union) is a Russian taekwondo practitioner. At the 2012 Summer Olympics, she competed in the Women's 49 kg competition, but was defeated in the first round.
