= Mauro Crismanich =

Argentine taekwondo practitioner

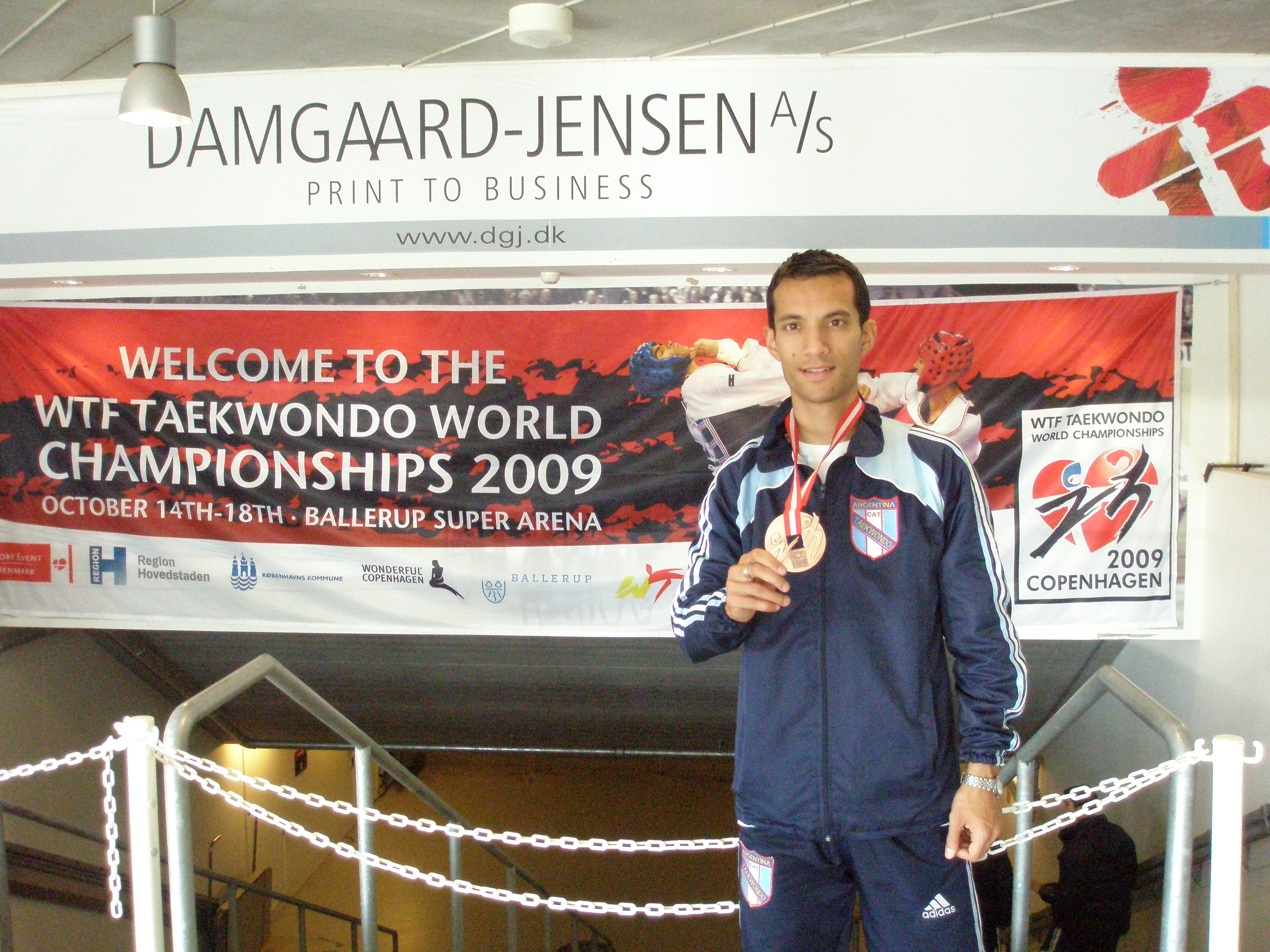

Personal information
- Born: February 20, 1984 (age 42) Corrientes, Argentina

Sport
- Sport: Taekwondo
Medal record
Men's taekwondo
Representing Argentina
World Championships
Bronze medal – third place	2009 Copenhagen	Flyweight

Mauro Crismanich (born February 20, 1984) is an Argentine taekwondo athlete.

== Biography ==
Mauro Crismanich was born in Corrientes, Corrientes Province, into a Croatian immigrant family Crismanich (Croatian: Krizmanić). His brother, Sebastian is also a well-known taekwondo practitioner who won the gold medal in the men's 80 kg division at the 2012 Summer Olympics.
