= Damián Villa =

Mexican athlete (born 1990)

Personal information
- Born: August 7, 1990 (age 36) Zamora, Michoacán, Mexico

Sport
- Sport: Taekwondo
Medal record
Representing Mexico
World Championships
Silver medal – second place	2009 Copenhagen	−58 kg
Bronze medal – third place	2013 Puebla	−58 kg
Grand Prix
Bronze medal – third place	2013 Manchester	–58 kg
Pan American Games
Silver medal – second place	2011 Guadalajara	–58 kg
Central American and Caribbean Games
Silver medal – second place	2010 Mayaguez	−58 kg
Bronze medal – third place	2014 Veracruz	−58 kg

Damian Alejandro Villa Valadez (born August 7, 1990) is a male Mexican taekwondo athlete. He is a double World Medalist at the World Taekwondo Championships, earning medals in 2009 and 2013. He is also a silver medalist at the 2011 Pan American Games, as well as a Silver and a bronze medalist at the 2010 and 2014 Central American Games, respectively.
