= The Switch Drag Race =

Reality competition television series

- Genre: Reality competition
- Based on: RuPaul's Drag Race
- Directed by: Ricardo Durán
- Presented by: Karla Constant
- Judges: Nicole Gaultier (Season 1 and 2); Íngrid Cruz (Season 1 and 2); Juan Pablo González (Season 1); Sebastián Errázuriz (Season 1); Oscar Mediavilla (Season 2)
- Country of origin: Chile
- Original language: Spanish
- No. of seasons: 2
- No. of episodes: 55

Production
- Executive producer: Jaime Sepulveda
- Camera setup: Multiple
- Running time: 60–90 minutes (without commercials)

Original release
- Network: Mega
- Release: October 8, 2015 – August 15, 2018

Related
- Drag Race franchise

The Switch Drag Race is a Chilean reality competition television series, presented by Mega as a Chilean version of the hit American show RuPaul's Drag Race. The purpose of the series is to find Chile's top transformista (transformer, drag queen) of the season.

Later, on the second season, the eligibility for competitors was expanded. The contestants were still predominantly from Chile & Argentina (with select returning queens from season one); the other half hailed everywhere from Puerto Rico, Spain, and Mexico, to Brazil and even France and the U.S.

Like the American version, The Switch requires its contestants to sing live, lip-sync, dance, and perform impersonations, but the show's format is significantly changed.

Hosted by Karla Constant (one of the hosts of Mucho gusto, also on Mega), the first season of The Switch, subtitled El Arte de Transformismo, premiered on October 8, 2015, and ended on January 17, 2016. After over two years’ hiatus, The Switch returned to MEGA for a second season, subtitled Desafío Mundial, on Sunday, March 25, 2018. Season two ended on June 15, 2018.

== Format ==
Season 1 of The Switch consisted of seventeen participants, often split into two groups, that were challenged with demonstrating their ability to perform makeovers, impersonate female characters, dance, lip-sync, and sing live on stage. Along with the demonstration of their skills, The Switch shows each contestant's life story, giving details of their personal experiences to Chilean viewers.

Season 2 consists of six returning contestants from the previous season as well as seven new contestants from outside of Chile. The participants being split up into two groups; one group consisting of the returning contestants and the other group formed from their challengers from around the world.

=== Judging ===
Judges on The Switch
Judge	Occupation	Country of Origin	Season	
Judge	Occupation	Country of Origin	1	2
Nicole Gaultier	Drag entertainer	Uruguay	Main	Main
Íngrid Cruz	Actor	Chile	Main	Main
Juan Pablo González	Musician	Chile	Main	
Sebastián Errázuriz	Composer	Chile	Main	
Oscar Mediavilla	Composer	Argentina		Main

Coaches on The Switch
Coach	Occupation	Country of Origin	Season	
Coach	Occupation	Country of Origin	1	2
Nicole Gaultier	Drag entertainer	Uruguay	Main	
Íngrid Cruz	Actor	Chile	Main	
Patricia Maldonado	Singer and TV Personality	Chile	Main	
Nicanor Bravo	Fashion designer	Argentina	Main	
Darwin Ruz	Dancer	Chile		Main
Álvaro Véliz	Singer	Chile		Main

== See also ==
- LGBT in Chile
