= Heiner Oviedo =

Costa Rican taekwondo practitioner

Personal information
- Nationality: Costa Rica
- Born: 28 December 1988 (age 37) San Jose, Costa Rica
- Height: 170 cm (5.6 ft)
- Weight: 58 kg (128 lb)

Sport
- Country: Costa Rica
- Sport: Taekwondo
- Coached by: Pablo Alfaro

Achievements and titles
- Highest world ranking: 14
Medal record
Men's taekwondo
Representing Costa Rica
Central American & Caribbean Games
Bronze medal – third place	2010 Mayagüez	-54 kg
- Updated on 17 September 2012

Heiner Oviedo (born 28 December 1988, in San José) is a Costa Rican taekwondo practitioner. He competed in the 58 kg event at the 2012 Summer Olympics and was eliminated in the preliminary round by Russia's Aleksey Denisenko.
