= Tennis at the 2012 Summer Olympics – Qualification =

Qualification
- Tennis at the 2012 Summer Olympics

Events
| Singles | men | women |
| Doubles | men | women | mixed |
Qualification
| ← 2008 · | Summer Olympics | · 2016 → |

Qualification for tennis at the 2012 Summer Olympics in London, United Kingdom, was determined not by any form of qualifying tournament, but by the rankings maintained by the Association of Tennis Professionals (ATP) and the Women's Tennis Association (WTA).

== Qualifying criteria ==
The main qualifying criteria were the ATP and WTA ranking lists as of 11 June 2012. The players entering were formally submitted by the International Tennis Federation. The ATP and WTA rankings were based on performances from the previous 52 weeks, and there were several tournaments in the two-month period between the time of the rankings being frozen for entry and the beginning of the tennis events at the Olympics. Players must have also made themselves available for two Fed/Davis Cup events from 2009–2012, one of which must have taken place in 2011–2012, and had a good standing with their National Olympic Committee.

Each National Olympic Committee (NOC) could enter up to six men and six women athletes, with a maximum of four entries in the individual events, and two pairs in the doubles events. Any player in the world's top 56 was eligible, and NOCs had the option to enter players of a lower rank. Athletes were able to compete in both singles and doubles events. Doubles players within the top 10 doubles rankings on 11 June were eligible to bring any player provided that player had any doubles or singles ranking, and as long as the number of players from the same country did not surpass the total of six.

== Qualifiers ==
| ^{a} | Player did not participate as a result of injury or the choice not to compete |
| ^{b} | Player had not met the minimal Fed/Davis Cup representation level |
| ^{c} | Player is ineligible due to too many players from a certain country |

The Entry List was released on 26 June 2012, based on the rankings as at 11 June.

=== Men's singles ===
| No. | Rank | Player | NOC |
World Ranking
| 1 | 1 | Novak Djokovic | Serbia |
| ^{a} | 2 | Rafael Nadal (Note: Rafael Nadal was originally in the entry list but withdrew due to ongoing knee problem. His slot was occupied by the 5th highest ranked Spaniard Feliciano Lopez who originally didn't made the list due to Spain having 4 representatives in singles already. Nadal was also scheduled to play doubles with Marcel Granollers and was replaced by Marc Lopez in partnering Granollers.) | Spain |
| 2 | 3 | Roger Federer | Switzerland |
| 3 | 4 | Andy Murray | Great Britain |
| 4 | 5 | Jo-Wilfried Tsonga | France |
| 5 | 6 | David Ferrer | Spain |
| 6 | 7 | Tomáš Berdych | Czech Republic |
| 7 | 8 | Janko Tipsarević | Serbia |
| 8 | 9 | Juan Martín del Potro | Argentina |
| 9 | 10 | John Isner | United States |
| 10 | 11 | Nicolás Almagro | Spain |
| ^{a} | 12 | Mardy Fish | United States |
| 11 | 13 | Gilles Simon | France |
| 12 | 14 | Juan Mónaco | Argentina |
| ^{a} | 15 | Gaël Monfils (Note: Gaël Monfils was originally in the entry list but withdrew due to a knee problem. His slot was occupied by the 5th highest ranked Frenchman Julien Benneteau who originally didn't made the list due to France having 4 representatives in singles already.) | France |
| 13 | 16 | Fernando Verdasco | Spain |
| 14 | 17 | Feliciano López | Spain |
| 15 | 18 | Kei Nishikori | Japan |
| 16 | 19 | Richard Gasquet | France |
| ^{b} | 20 | Alexandr Dolgopolov | Ukraine |
| 17 | 21 | Milos Raonic | Canada |
| ^{c} | 22 | Marcel Granollers | Spain |
| 18 | 23 | Stanislas Wawrinka | Switzerland |
| 19 | 24 | Andreas Seppi | Italy |
| 20 | 25 | Marin Čilić | Croatia |
| 21 | 26 | Radek Štěpánek | Czech Republic |
| 22 | 27 | Bernard Tomic | Australia |
| 23 | 28 | Julien Benneteau | France |
| ^{a} | 29 | Florian Mayer | Germany |
| ^{b} | 30 | Kevin Anderson (Note: Kevin Anderson applied for a US green card after marrying Kelsey O’Neal, an American citizen. This process prevented him from leaving the United States and thus making himself available for the 2012 Davis Cup season. Therefore he could not fulfill the qualification criteria and is not eligible for the Olympics.) | South Africa |
| 24 | 31 | Mikhail Youzhny | Russia |
| 25 | 32 | Andy Roddick | United States |
| 26 | 33 | Viktor Troicki | Serbia |
| ^{a} | 34 | Philipp Kohlschreiber | Germany |
| 27 | 35 | Jürgen Melzer | Austria |
| ^{c} | 36 | Pablo Andújar | Spain |
| 28 | 37 | Carlos Berlocq | Argentina |
| ^{c} | 38 | Juan Carlos Ferrero | Spain |
| 29 | 39 | David Nalbandian | Argentina |
| 30 | 40 | Robin Haase | Netherlands |
| 31 | 41 | Denis Istomin | Uzbekistan |
| 32 | 42 | Marcos Baghdatis | Cyprus |
| ^{c} | 43 | Albert Ramos Viñolas | Spain |
| 33 | 44 | Santiago Giraldo | Colombia |
| 34 | 45 | Jarkko Nieminen | Finland |
| 35 | 46 | Alex Bogomolov Jr. | Russia |
| 36 | 47 | Nikolay Davydenko | Russia |
| 37 | 48 | Donald Young (Note: Donald Young hasn't played any Davis Cup matches so far though he made himself available for drafting and thus hasn't been ruled out by the USTA Olympic Selection Oversight Committee.) | United States |
| 38 | 49 | Mikhail Kukushkin | Kazakhstan |
| 39 | 50 | Łukasz Kubot | Poland |
| ^{c} | 51 | Michaël Llodra | France |
| 40 | 52 | Ryan Harrison | United States |
| 41 | 53 | Gilles Müller | Luxembourg |
| 42 | 54 | Go Soeda | Japan |
| ^{c} | 55 | Jérémy Chardy | France |
| ^{a} | 56 | Ivo Karlović (Note: Ivo Karlović was originally in the entry list but withdrew due to a foot injury. His slot was occupied by the highest ranked player on site German Philipp Petzschner.) | Croatia |
| 43 | 57 | Yen-Hsun Lu | Chinese Taipei |
| 44 | 58 | Lukáš Lacko | Slovakia |
| ^{c} | 59 | Benoît Paire | France |
| 45 | 60 | Martin Kližan | Slovakia |
| 46 | 61 | Olivier Rochus | Belgium |
| ^{c} | 62 | Leonardo Mayer | Argentina |
| 47 | 63 | Fabio Fognini | Italy |
| 48 | 64 | David Goffin (Note: Although David Goffin only played one Davis Cup match in his career he was allowed to participate in the Olympics by the Belgian Olympic Committee given he finished in the top 56 on June 11.) | Belgium |
| ^{c} | 65 | Nicolas Mahut | France |
| 49 | 66 | Dmitry Tursunov | Russia |
| ^{c} | 67 | Édouard Roger-Vasselin | France |
| 50 | 68 | Tatsuma Ito | Japan |
| 51 | 69 | Ivan Dodig | Croatia |
| 52 | 70 | Alejandro Falla | Colombia |
| 53 | 71 | Steve Darcis | Belgium |
| 54 | 72 | Grigor Dimitrov | Bulgaria |
ITF places
| 55 | 73 | Malek Jaziri | Tunisia |
| 56 | 76 | Thomaz Bellucci | Brazil |
| 57 | 79 | Adrian Ungur | Romania |
| 58 | 80 | Blaž Kavčič | Slovenia |
| 59 | 85^{PR(240)} | Somdev Devvarman | India |
| 60 | 86 | Sergiy Stakhovsky | Ukraine |
| 61 | 103 | Vasek Pospisil | Canada |
| 62 | 205 | Lleyton Hewitt | Australia |
Alternates
| 63 | 144 | Philipp Petzschner | Germany |
| 64 | 461 | Vishnu Vardhan | India |

=== Women's singles ===
| No. | Rank | Player | NOC |
|---|---|---|---|
| 1 | 1 | Maria Sharapova | Russia |
| 2 | 2 | Victoria Azarenka | Belarus |
| 3 | 3 | Agnieszka Radwańska | Poland |
| 4 | 4 | Petra Kvitová | Czech Republic |
| 5 | 5 | Samantha Stosur | Australia |
| 6 | 6 | Serena Williams | United States |
| 7 | 7 | Caroline Wozniacki | Denmark |
| ^{b} | 8 | Marion Bartoli | France |
| 8 | 9 | Angelique Kerber | Germany |
| 9 | 10 | Sara Errani | Italy |
| 10 | 11 | Li Na | China |
| 11 | 12 | Dominika Cibulková | Slovakia |
| 12 | 13 | Vera Zvonareva | Russia |
| 13 | 14 | Ana Ivanovic | Serbia |
| 14 | 15 | Sabine Lisicki | Germany |
| ^{a} | 16 | Kaia Kanepi (Note: Kaia Kanepi was originally in the entry list but withdrew due to failing to recover from a heel injury. Her slot was occupied by Tímea Babos and Babos's ITF place was taken by Mariana Duque-Mariño.) | Estonia |
| 15 | 17 | Flavia Pennetta | Italy |
| ^{a} | 18 | Andrea Petkovic (Note: Andrea Petkovic was originally in the entry list but withdrew due to ongoing ankle injury. Her slot was occupied by the 5th highest ranked German Mona Barthel who originally didn't make the list due to Germany having 4 representatives in singles already. Petkovic was also scheduled to play doubles with Julia Görges and was replaced by Anna-Lena Grönefeld in partnering Görges.) | Germany |
| 16 | 19 | Maria Kirilenko | Russia |
| 17 | 20 | Roberta Vinci | Italy |
| 18 | 21 | Lucie Šafářová | Czech Republic |
| 19 | 22 | Jelena Janković | Serbia |
| 20 | 23 | Nadia Petrova | Russia |
| 21 | 24 | Daniela Hantuchová | Slovakia |
| ^{c} | 24^{PR(556)} | Alisa Kleybanova | Russia |
| 22 | 25 | Julia Görges | Germany |
| 23 | 26 | Petra Cetkovská | Czech Republic |
| 24 | 27 | Francesca Schiavone | Italy |
| 25 | 28 | Anabel Medina Garrigues | Spain |
| 26 | 29 | Christina McHale | United States |
| ^{a} | 30 | Monica Niculescu (Note: Monica Niculescu was originally in the entry list but withdrew due to an injury she sustained in the Wimbledon Championships. Her slot was occupied by Kateryna Bondarenko and Bondarenko's ITF place was taken by Timea Babos. Niculescu's place in the women's doubles with Irina-Camelia Begu was taken by the Bondarenko sisters, whose ITF place was awarded to Elena Baltacha and Anne Keothavong.) | Romania |
| 27 | 31 | Peng Shuai | China |
| 28 | 32 | Zheng Jie | China |
| ^{c} | 33 | Svetlana Kuznetsova | Russia |
| ^{c} | 34 | Anastasia Pavlyuchenkova | Russia |
| 29 | 35 | Klára Zakopalová | Czech Republic |
| 30 | 36 | Mona Barthel | Germany |
| ^{a} | 36^{PR(322)} | Alona Bondarenko (Note: Alona Bondarenko was originally in the entry list but withdrew due to injury. Her slot was occupied by the highest ranked player on site British Heather Watson. Bondarenko was supposed to compete in doubles as well with sister Kateryna Bondarenko, their slot was not occupied by another team instead the top seed received a bye.) | Ukraine |
| 31 | 37 | Yanina Wickmayer | Belgium |
| 32 | 38 | Carla Suárez Navarro | Spain |
| 33 | 39 | Tsvetana Pironkova | Bulgaria |
| 34 | 40 | Simona Halep | Romania |
| ^{b} | 41 | Ksenia Pervak | Kazakhstan |
| ^{a} | 42 | Petra Martić (Note: Petra Martić was originally in the entry list but withdrew due to a foot injury. Her slot was occupied by the highest ranked player on site British Laura Robson.) | Croatia |
| ^{b} | 43 | Chanelle Scheepers | South Africa |
| 35 | 44 | Polona Hercog | Slovenia |
| 36 | 44^{PR(NR)} | Ágnes Szávay | Hungary |
| 37 | 45 | María José Martínez Sánchez | Spain |
| 38 | 46 | Marina Erakovic | New Zealand |
| 39 | 47 | Venus Williams | United States |
| ^{a} | 47^{PR(431)} | Timea Bacsinszky (Note: Tamira Paszek was initially ruled ineligible by the ITF, but won the appeal lodged by Tennis Austria. She replaced Timea Bacsinszky of Switzerland, who was on the initial entry list but told Swiss Tennis she would not compete in the Olympics.) | Switzerland |
| 40 | 48 | Sofia Arvidsson | Sweden |
| 41 | 49 | Shahar Pe'er | Israel |
| 42 | 50 | Kim Clijsters | Belgium |
| 43 | 51 | Sorana Cîrstea | Romania |
| 44 | 52 | Varvara Lepchenko | United States |
| ^{c} | 53 | Iveta Benešová | Czech Republic |
| ^{c} | 54 | Ekaterina Makarova | Russia |
| 45 | 55 | Galina Voskoboeva | Kazakhstan |
| 46 | 56 | Aleksandra Wozniak | Canada |
| ^{c} | 57 | Sloane Stephens | United States |
| 47 | 58 | Tamira Paszek | Austria |
| ^{c} | 59 | Vania King | United States |
| ^{c} | 59^{PR(295)} | Anna Chakvetadze | Russia |
| ^{c} | 60 | Barbora Záhlavová-Strýcová | Czech Republic |
| 48 | 61 | Irina-Camelia Begu | Romania |
| 49 | 62 | Yaroslava Shvedova | Kazakhstan |
| 50 | 63 | Urszula Radwańska | Poland |
| 51 | 64 | Silvia Soler-Espinosa | Spain |
| 52 | 65 | Hsieh Su-wei | Chinese Taipei |
| 53 | 66 | Kateryna Bondarenko | Ukraine |
| ^{c} | 67 | Lucie Hradecká | Czech Republic |
| 54 | 68 | Tímea Babos | Hungary |
| ^{b} | 69 | Romina Oprandi | Switzerland^{†} |
| 55 | 70 | Anna Tatishvili | Georgia |
ITF places
| 56 | 73 | Alizé Cornet | France |
| 57 | 76 | Anne Keothavong | Great Britain |
| 58 | 91 | Elena Baltacha | Great Britain |
| 59 | 117 | Mariana Duque Mariño | Colombia |
| 60 | 111 | Heather Watson | Great Britain |
| 61 | 336 | Ons Jabeur | Tunisia |
Tripartite Commission Invitation
| 62 | 176 | Verónica Cepede Royg* | Paraguay |
| 63 | 236 | Stephanie Vogt* | Liechtenstein |
Alternates
| 64 | 114 | Laura Robson | Great Britain |

† Romina Oprandi has previously represented Italy, making her ineligible for Switzerland.

PR Protected/Special Ranking
Rankings as at 11 June 2012

- * by Tripartite Commission Invitation, their rankings as of 11 June 2012

=== Men's doubles ===
| No. | Combined Rankings | Rank | Player A | Rank | Player B | NOC |
World Ranking
| 1 | | | Alexander Bury | 1 | Max Mirnyi | Belarus |
| 2 | | 1 | Daniel Nestor | | Vasek Pospisil^ | Canada |
| 3 | | 3 | Bob Bryan | 3 | Mike Bryan | United States |
| 4 | | 5 | Michaël Llodra | | Jo-Wilfried Tsonga^ | France |
| 5 | | | Janko Tipsarević^ | 6 | Nenad Zimonjić | Serbia |
| 6 | | 7 | Leander Paes | | Vishnu Vardhan | India |
| 7 | | 8 | Mariusz Fyrstenberg | 9 | Marcin Matkowski | Poland |
| 8 | | | Johan Brunström | 10 | Robert Lindstedt | Sweden |
Other entrants
| 9 | 20 | 7' | Tomáš Berdych^ | 13 | Radek Štěpánek^ | Czech Republic |
| 10 | 23 | 6' | David Ferrer^ | 17' | Feliciano López^ | Spain |
| 11 | 26 | 3' | Roger Federer^ | 23' | Stanislas Wawrinka^ | Switzerland |
| 12 | 27 | 15 | Mahesh Bhupathi | 12 | Rohan Bopanna | India |
| 13 | 34 | 1' | Novak Djokovic^ | 33' | Victor Troicki^ | Serbia |
| 14 | 35 | 19 | Marcel Granollers | 16 | Marc López | Spain |
| 15 | 39 | 4' | Andy Murray^ | 35 | Jamie Murray | Great Britain |
| 16 | 37 | 17 | Jürgen Melzer^ | 20 | Alexander Peya | Austria |
| 17 | 40 | 22 | Christopher Kas | 18 | Philipp Petzschner^ | Germany |
| 18 | 42 | 10' | John Isner^ | 32' | Andy Roddick^ | United States |
| 19 | 45 | 21 | Daniele Bracciali | 24' | Andreas Seppi^ | Italy |
| 20 | 47 | 28' | Julien Benneteau^ | 19' | Richard Gasquet^ | France |
| 21 | 55 | 27 | Marcelo Melo | 29 | Bruno Soares | Brazil |
| 22 | 61 | 30 | Colin Fleming | 31 | Ross Hutchins | Great Britain |
| 23 | 63 | 40' | Robin Haase^ | 23 | Jean-Julien Rojer | Netherlands |
| 24 | 69 | 25' | Marin Čilić^ | 44 | Ivan Dodig^ | Croatia |
ITF places
| 25 | 72 | 18' | Kei Nishikori^ | 54' | Go Soeda^ | Japan |
| 26 | 75 | 37 | Jonathan Erlich | 38 | Andy Ram | Israel |
| 27 | 78 | 47' | Nikolay Davydenko^ | 31' | Mikhail Youzhny^ | Russia |
| 28 | 78 | 34 | Juan Sebastián Cabal | 44' | Santiago Giraldo^ | Colombia |
| 29 | 88 | 39' | David Nalbandian^ | 47 | Eduardo Schwank | Argentina |
| 30 | 90 | 11 | Horia Tecău | 79' | Adrian Ungur^ | Romania |
| 31 | 118 | 60' | Martin Kližan^ | 58' | Lukáš Lacko^ | Slovakia |
| 32 | 121 | 76' | Thomaz Bellucci^ | 45 | André Sá | Brazil |

' Players higher ranking is singles
^ Players have also qualified to the singles tournament

=== Women's doubles ===
| No. | Combined Rankings | Rank | Player A | Rank | Player B | NOC |
World Ranking
| 1 | | 1 | Liezel Huber | 1 | Lisa Raymond | United States |
| 2 | | 3 | Sara Errani^ | 3 | Roberta Vinci^ | Italy |
| 3 | | 5 | Katarina Srebotnik | | Andreja Klepač | Slovenia |
| ^{a} | | 5 | Květa Peschke | | | Czech Republic |
| 4 | | 7 | Maria Kirilenko^ | | Nadia Petrova^ | Russia |
| 5 | | 8 | Yaroslava Shvedova^ | | Galina Voskoboeva^ | Kazakhstan |
| ^{a} | | 9 | Vania King | | | United States |
| 6 | | 10 | Elena Vesnina | | Ekaterina Makarova | Russia |
Other entrants
| 7 | 24 | 9' | Angelique Kerber^ | 15' | Sabine Lisicki^ | Germany |
| 8 | 30 | 17 | Andrea Hlaváčková | 13 | Lucie Hradecká | Czech Republic |
| 9 | 36 | 12' | Dominika Cibulková^ | 24' | Daniela Hantuchová^ | Slovakia |
| 10 | 42 | 15 | Flavia Pennetta^ | 27' | Francesca Schiavone^ | Italy |
| 11 | 44 | 16 | Nuria Llagostera Vives | 28 | María José Martínez Sánchez^ | Spain |
| 12 | 47 | 26' | Petra Cetkovská^ | 21' | Lucie Šafářová^ | Czech Republic |
| 13 | 50 | 11' | Li Na^ | 39 | Zhang Shuai | China |
| 14 | 52 | 31 | Peng Shuai^ | 21 | Zheng Jie^ | China |
| 15 | 53 | 6' | Serena Williams^ | 47' | Venus Williams^ | United States |
| 16 | 53 | 28' | Anabel Medina Garrigues^ | 25 | Arantxa Parra Santonja | Spain |
| 17 | 57 | 36 | Jarmila Gajdošová | 19 | Anastasia Rodionova | Australia |
| 18 | 61 | 25' | Julia Görges^ | 36 | Anna-Lena Grönefeld | Germany |
| 19 | 65 | 14 | Gisela Dulko | 51 | Paola Suárez | Argentina |
| 20 | 66 | 3' | Agnieszka Radwańska^ | 63' | Urszula Radwańska^ | Poland |
| 21 | 67 | 62 | Casey Dellacqua | 5' | Samantha Stosur^ | Australia |
| ^{a} | 69 | 40 | Irina-Camelia Begu^ | 29 | Monica Niculescu^ | Romania |
| 22 | 90 | 49 | Klaudia Jans-Ignacik | 41 | Alicja Rosolska | Poland |
| 23 | 91 | 51' | Sorana Cîrstea^ | 40' | Simona Halep^ | Romania |
| ^{a} | 102 | 36'^{PR} | Alona Bondarenko^ | 66' | Kateryna Bondarenko^ | Ukraine |
| 24 | | | Bye | | Bye | |
ITF places
| 25 | | | Stéphanie Dubois | | Aleksandra Wozniak^ | Canada |
| 26 | | | Chuang Chia-jung | | Hsieh Su-wei^ | Chinese Taipei |
| 27 | | | Alizé Cornet^ | | Kristina Mladenovic | France |
| 28 | | | Margalita Chakhnashvili | | Anna Tatishvili^ | Georgia |
| 29 | | | Laura Robson^ | | Heather Watson^ | Great Britain |
| 30 | | | Tímea Babos^ | | Ágnes Szávay^ | Hungary |
| 31 | | | Rushmi Chakravarthi | | Sania Mirza | India |
| 32 | | | Anne Keothavong^ | | Elena Baltacha^ | Great Britain |

' Players higher ranking is singles
^ Players have also qualified to the singles tournament

=== Mixed doubles ===
The Entry List was released on 31 July 2012, based on the rankings as at 11 June.

| No. | Combined Rankings | Rank | Player A | Rank | Player B | NOC |
Direct Entrants
| 1 | 3 | 2' | Victoria Azarenka | 1 | Max Mirnyi | Belarus |
| 2 | 4 | 1 | Lisa Raymond | 3 | Mike Bryan | United States |
| 3 | 4 | 1 | Liezel Huber | 3 | Bob Bryan | United States |
| 4 | 12 | 3' | Agnieszka Radwańska | 9 | Marcin Matkowski | Poland |
| 5 | 19 | 12 | Sania Mirza | 7 | Leander Paes | India |
| 6 | 20 | 14' | Ana Ivanovic | 6 | Nenad Zimonjić | Serbia |
| 7 | 23 | 14 | Gisela Dulko | 9' | Juan Martín del Potro | Argentina |
| 8 | 24 | 3 | Roberta Vinci | 21 | Daniele Bracciali | Italy |
| 9 | 26 | 13 | Lucie Hradecká | 13 | Radek Štěpánek | Czech Republic |
| 10 | 27 | 3 | Sara Errani | 24' | Andreas Seppi | Italy |
| 11 | 27 | 9' | Angelique Kerber | 18 | Philipp Petzschner | Germany |
| 12 | 37 | 15' | Sabine Lisicki | 22 | Christopher Kas | Germany |
ITF places
| 13 | 41 | 10 | Elena Vesnina | 31' | Mikhail Youzhny | Russia |
| 14 | 58 | 48' | Sofia Arvidsson | 10 | Robert Lindstedt | Sweden |
| 15 | 118 | 114' | Laura Robson | 4 | Andy Murray | Great Britain |
| 16 | 210 | 5 | Samantha Stosur | 205 | Lleyton Hewitt | Australia |

== Summary ==
Numbers represent the current conditions (27 July 2012)

| Nation | Men | | Women | | Mixed | Total |
| Nation | Singles | Doubles | Singles | Doubles | Mixed | Total |
|---|---|---|---|---|---|---|
| Argentina | 4 | 2(1) | 0 | 2(2) | 2 | 7 |
| Australia | 2 | 0 | 1 | 4(3) | 2 | 6 |
| Austria | 1 | 2(1) | 1 | 0 | 0 | 3 |
| Belarus | 0 | 2(2) | 1 | 0 | 2 | 3 |
| Belgium | 3 | 0 | 2 | 0 | 0 | 5 |
| Brazil | 1 | 4(3) | 0 | 0 | 0 | 4 |
| Bulgaria | 1 | 0 | 1 | 0 | 0 | 2 |
| Canada | 2 | 2(1) | 1 | 2(1) | 0 | 5 |
| China | 0 | 0 | 3 | 4(1) | 0 | 4 |
| Chinese Taipei | 1 | 0 | 1 | 2(1) | 0 | 3 |
| Colombia | 2 | 2(1) | 1 | 0 | 0 | 4 |
| Croatia | 2 | 2(0) | 0 | 0 | 0 | 2 |
| Cyprus | 1 | 0 | 0 | 0 | 0 | 1 |
| Czech Republic | 2 | 2(0) | 4 | 4(2) | 2 | 8 |
| Denmark | 0 | 0 | 1 | 0 | 0 | 1 |
| Finland | 1 | 0 | 0 | 0 | 0 | 1 |
| France | 4 | 4(1) | 1 | 2(1) | 0 | 7 |
| Georgia | 0 | 0 | 1 | 2(1) | 0 | 2 |
| Germany | 2 | 2(1) | 4 | 4(1) | 4 | 8 |
| Great Britain | 1 | 4(3) | 4 | 4(0) | 2 | 8 |
| Hungary | 0 | 0 | 2 | 2(0) | 0 | 2 |
| India | 2 | 4(4) | 0 | 2(2) | 2 | 7 |
| Israel | 0 | 2(2) | 1 | 0 | 0 | 3 |
| Italy | 2 | 2(1) | 4 | 4(0) | 4 | 7 |
| Japan | 3 | 2(0) | 0 | 0 | 0 | 3 |
| Kazakhstan | 1 | 0 | 2 | 2(0) | 0 | 3 |
| Liechtenstein | 0 | 0 | 1 | 0 | 0 | 1 |
| Luxembourg | 1 | 0 | 0 | 0 | 0 | 1 |
| Netherlands | 1 | 2(1) | 0 | 0 | 0 | 2 |
| New Zealand | 0 | 0 | 1 | 0 | 0 | 1 |
| Paraguay | 0 | 0 | 1 | 0 | 0 | 1 |
| Poland | 1 | 2(2) | 2 | 4(2) | 2 | 7 |
| Romania | 1 | 2(1) | 3 | 2(0) | 0 | 5 |
| Russia | 4 | 2(0) | 4 | 4(2) | 2 | 10 |
| Serbia | 3 | 4(1) | 2 | 0 | 2 | 6 |
| Slovakia | 2 | 2(0) | 2 | 2(0) | 0 | 4 |
| Slovenia | 1 | 0 | 1 | 2(2) | 0 | 4 |
| Spain | 4 | 4(2) | 4 | 4(2) | 0 | 12 |
| Sweden | 0 | 2(2) | 1 | 0 | 2 | 3 |
| Switzerland | 2 | 2(0) | 0 | 0 | 0 | 2 |
| Tunisia | 1 | 0 | 1 | 0 | 0 | 2 |
| Ukraine | 1 | 0 | 1 | 0 | 0 | 2 |
| United States | 4 | 4(2) | 4 | 4(2) | 4 | 12 |
| Uzbekistan | 1 | 0 | 0 | 0 | 0 | 1 |
| Total: 44 NOCs | 64 | 64(32) | 64 | 62(25) | 32 | 185 |

- Number in brackets = players participating only in doubles
