= Tennis at the 2012 Summer Olympics – Men's doubles =

Men's doubles
- Tennis at the 2012 Summer Olympics

Final
- Champions: (United States) Bob Bryan; (United States) Mike Bryan
- Runners-up: (France) Michaël Llodra; (France) Jo-Wilfried Tsonga
- Score: 6–4, 7–6^{(7–2)}

Events
Singles	men	women
Doubles	men	women	mixed
Qualification
- Summer Olympics

Men's doubles tennis at the Games of the XXX Olympiad
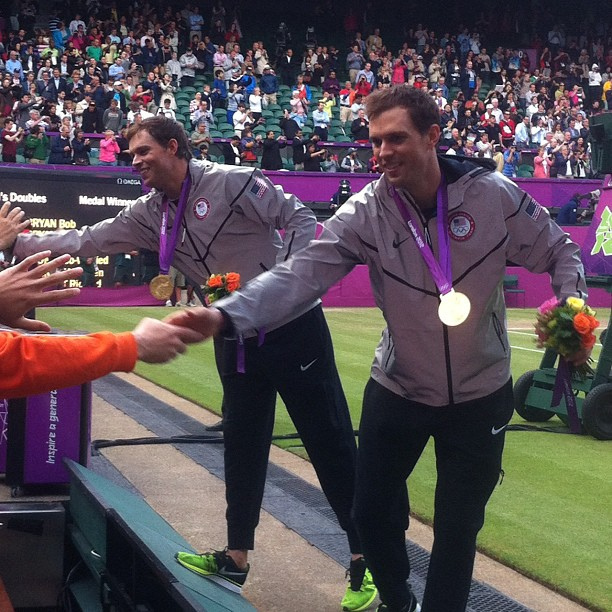
- Gold medalists Bob Bryan and Mike Bryan
- Venue: All England Club, Wimbledon
- Dates: 28 July – 4 August 2012
- Competitors: 64 from 25 nations

Medalists
1st place, gold medalist(s)		Bob Bryan; Mike Bryan	United States
2nd place, silver medalist(s)		Jo-Wilfried Tsonga; Michaël Llodra	France
3rd place, bronze medalist(s)		Julien Benneteau; Richard Gasquet	France

The United States' Bob Bryan and Mike Bryan defeated France's Michaël Llodra and Jo-Wilfried Tsonga in the final, 6–4, 7–6^{(7–2)} to win the gold medal in Men's Doubles tennis at the 2012 Summer Olympics. With the win, the Bryan brothers completed the career Golden Slam, making them the second men's doubles team to do so (after the Woodies; Daniel Nestor also completed the career Golden Slam, with multiple partners). Their victory marked the first instance that both Olympic tennis doubles titles were claimed by siblings; fellow Americans Serena and Venus Williams won the women's doubles title. It was a record fourth gold medal for the United States in men's doubles. In the bronze-medal match, France's Julien Benneteau and Richard Gasquet defeated Spain's David Ferrer and Feliciano López, 7–6^{(7–4)}, 6–2. With France's silver and bronze, this was the first time since 1924 that one nation won multiple medals in the men's doubles.

The tournament was held at the All England Club in Wimbledon, London, from 28 July to 4 August, making it the first Olympic grass court tournament since tennis was re-introduced to the Games. The event was run and organised by the International Olympic Committee (IOC) and the International Tennis Federation (ITF), and was part of the Association of Tennis Professionals tour. Matches were the best-of-three sets, and tie-breaks were in use for all sets except the third set. There were 32 teams from 25 countries.

Switzerland's Roger Federer and Stan Wawrinka were the defending gold medalists from 2008, but they lost in the second round to Israel's Jonathan Erlich and Andy Ram.

== Background ==
This was the 14th appearance of men's doubles tennis. The event has been held at every Summer Olympics where tennis has been on the program: from 1896 to 1924 and then from 1988 to the current program. A demonstration event was held in 1968.

The American pair of Bryan brothers, Bob Bryan and Mike Bryan, had been the top seed in 2004 but exited in the quarterfinals. They were again the number one seed in Beijing, but were defeated in the semifinals and took bronze. For a third Games, they were the top seed. Defending champions Roger Federer and Stan Wawrinka also returned. One of the French fourth-place team members, Michaël Llodra, also competed again, this time paired with Jo-Wilfried Tsonga. 2000 gold medalist Daniel Nestor (and career golden slam winner) of Canada competed for a fourth Games with his third different partner.

Colombia made its debut in the event. France and Great Britain each made their 11th appearance in the event, tied for most of all nations.

== Qualification ==
Qualification for the men's doubles was primarily through the ATP ranking list of 11 June 2012. An additional restriction was that players had to have been available for two Davis Cup events between 2009 and 2012. Nations had been able to enter four players (two pairs) in the event since the 2004 Games. Each nation was limited to a total of 6 male players in the singles and doubles events combined, so nations with 4 singles players could add only 2 more in doubles. The men's doubles draw was 32 pairs (64 players), with most of the pairs coming from the singles event where nations had 2 or 4 players. Doubles players ranked 10 or better qualified directly and could bring any ranked singles or doubles player from their nation as their partner. The ITF allocated places based on ranking and continental and national representation (bringing the total number of male tennis players to 86).

== Competition format ==
The competition was a single-elimination tournament with a bronze-medal match. All matches were best-of-three sets; the final was reduced from best-of-five in prior Games. Tiebreaks were used for any set before the third (fifth in the final) that reached 6–6.

== Schedule ==
July				August			
28	29	30	31	1	2	3	4
11:30	11:30	11:30	11:30	11:30	11:30	12:00	12:00
Round of 32		Round of 32; Round of 16	Round of 16		Quarter-finals	Semi-finals	Bronze medal match Gold medal match

== Seeds ==
1. Bob Bryan (USA) / Mike Bryan (USA) (winners, gold medalists)
2. Michaël Llodra (FRA) / Jo-Wilfried Tsonga (FRA) (final, silver medalists)
3. Janko Tipsarević (SRB) / Nenad Zimonjić (SRB) (quarterfinals)
4. Mariusz Fyrstenberg (POL) / Marcin Matkowski (POL) (first round)
5. Tomáš Berdych (CZE) / Radek Štěpánek (CZE) (second round)
6. Roger Federer (SUI) / Stanislas Wawrinka (SUI) (second round)
7. Mahesh Bhupathi (IND) / Rohan Bopanna (IND) (second round)
8. Novak Djokovic (SRB) / Viktor Troicki (SRB) (first round)

== Draw ==
=== Key ===
- INV = Tripartite invitation
- IP = ITF place
- Alt = Alternate
- w/o = Walkover
- r = Retired
- d = Defaulted

=== Finals ===
Semi-finals
1	Bob Bryan (USA); Mike Bryan (USA)	6	6
Julien Benneteau (FRA); Richard Gasquet (FRA)	4	4
David Ferrer (ESP); Feliciano López (ESP)	3	6	16
2	Michaël Llodra (FRA); Jo-Wilfried Tsonga (FRA)	6	4	18

Final (gold-medal match)
1	Bob Bryan (USA); Mike Bryan (USA)	6	7^{7}
2	Michaël Llodra (FRA); Jo-Wilfried Tsonga (FRA)	4	6^{2}
Bronze-medal match
Julien Benneteau (FRA); Richard Gasquet (FRA)	7^{7}	6
David Ferrer (ESP); Feliciano López (ESP)	6^{4}	2

=== Top half ===
First round
1	B Bryan (USA); M Bryan (USA)	7^{7}	6^{5}	6
IP	T Bellucci (BRA); A Sá (BRA)	6^{5}	7^{7}	3
C Kas (GER); P Petzschner (GER)	5	5
IP	N Davydenko (RUS); M Youzhny (RUS)	7	7
M Granollers (ESP); M López (ESP)	6^{5}	6^{3}
IP	J Erlich (ISR); A Ram (ISR)	7^{7}	7^{7}
IP	K Nishikori (JPN); G Soeda (JPN)	7^{7}	4	4
6	R Federer (SUI); S Wawrinka (SUI)	6^{5}	6	6
3	J Tipsarević (SRB); N Zimonjić (SRB)	6	6
IP	M Kližan (SVK); L Lacko (SVK)	3	3
D Nestor (CAN); V Pospisil (CAN)	6	7^{11}
IP	H Tecău (ROU); A Ungur (ROU)	3	6^{9}
C Fleming (GBR); R Hutchins (GBR)	5	3
J Benneteau (FRA); R Gasquet (FRA)	7	6
A Bury (BLR); M Mirnyi (BLR)	6^{4}	7^{7}	6
7	M Bhupathi (IND); R Bopanna (IND)	7^{7}	6^{4}	8

Second round
1	B Bryan (USA); M Bryan (USA)	7^{8}	7^{7}
IP	N Davydenko (RUS); M Youzhny (RUS)	6^{6}	6^{1}
IP	J Erlich (ISR); A Ram (ISR)	1	7^{7}	6
6	R Federer (SUI); S Wawrinka (SUI)	6	6^{5}	3
3	J Tipsarević (SRB); N Zimonjić (SRB)	6	6^{5}	11
D Nestor (CAN); V Pospisil (CAN)	4	7^{7}	9
J Benneteau (FRA); R Gasquet (FRA)	6	6
7	M Bhupathi (IND); R Bopanna (IND)	3	4

Quarter-finals
1	B Bryan (USA); M Bryan (USA)	7^{7}	7^{12}
IP	J Erlich (ISR); A Ram (ISR)	6^{4}	6^{10}
3	J Tipsarević (SRB); N Zimonjić (SRB)	4	6^{3}
J Benneteau (FRA); R Gasquet (FRA)	6	7^{7}

Semi-finals
1	B Bryan (USA); M Bryan (USA)	6	6
J Benneteau (FRA); R Gasquet (FRA)	4	4

=== Bottom half ===
First round
8	N Djokovic (SRB); V Troicki (SRB)	6^{8}	3
J Brunström (SWE); R Lindstedt (SWE)	7^{10}	6
M Čilić (CRO); I Dodig (CRO)	6	6
IP	JS Cabal (COL); S Giraldo (COL)	3	4
J Melzer (AUT); A Peya (AUT)	5	7^{8}	7
A Murray (GBR); J Murray (GBR)	7	6^{6}	5
D Ferrer (ESP); F López (ESP)	7^{9}	6^{6}	8
4	M Fyrstenberg (POL); M Matkowski (POL)	6^{7}	7^{8}	6
5	T Berdych (CZE); R Štěpánek (CZE)	4	7^{7}	6
D Bracciali (ITA); A Seppi (ITA)	6	6^{5}	4
J Isner (USA); A Roddick (USA)	2	4
M Melo (BRA); B Soares (BRA)	6	6
R Haase (NED); J-J Rojer (NED)	6^{1}	6	2
L Paes (IND); V Vardhan (IND)	7^{7}	4	6
IP	D Nalbandian (ARG); E Schwank (ARG)	3	5
2	M Llodra (FRA); J-W Tsonga (FRA)	6	7

Second round
J Brunström (SWE); R Lindstedt (SWE)	3	2
M Čilić (CRO); I Dodig (CRO)	6	6
J Melzer (AUT); A Peya (AUT)	3	6	9
D Ferrer (ESP); F López (ESP)	6	3	11
5	T Berdych (CZE); R Štěpánek (CZE)	6	4	22
M Melo (BRA); B Soares (BRA)	1	6	24
L Paes (IND); V Vardhan (IND)	6^{3}	6	3
2	M Llodra (FRA); J-W Tsonga (FRA)	7^{7}	4	6

Quarter-finals
M Čilić (CRO); I Dodig (CRO)	4	4
D Ferrer (ESP); F López (ESP)	6	6
M Melo (BRA); B Soares (BRA)	4	2
2	M Llodra (FRA); J-W Tsonga (FRA)	6	6

Semi-finals
D Ferrer (ESP); F López (ESP)	3	6	16
2	M Llodra (FRA); J-W Tsonga (FRA)	6	4	18
