= Tennis at the 2012 Summer Olympics – Men's singles =

Men's singles
- Tennis at the 2012 Summer Olympics

Final
- Champion: (United Kingdom) Andy Murray
- Runner-up: (Switzerland) Roger Federer
- Score: 6–2, 6–1, 6–4

Events
Singles	men	women
Doubles	men	women	mixed
Qualification
- Summer Olympics

Men's singles tennis at the Games of the XXX Olympiad
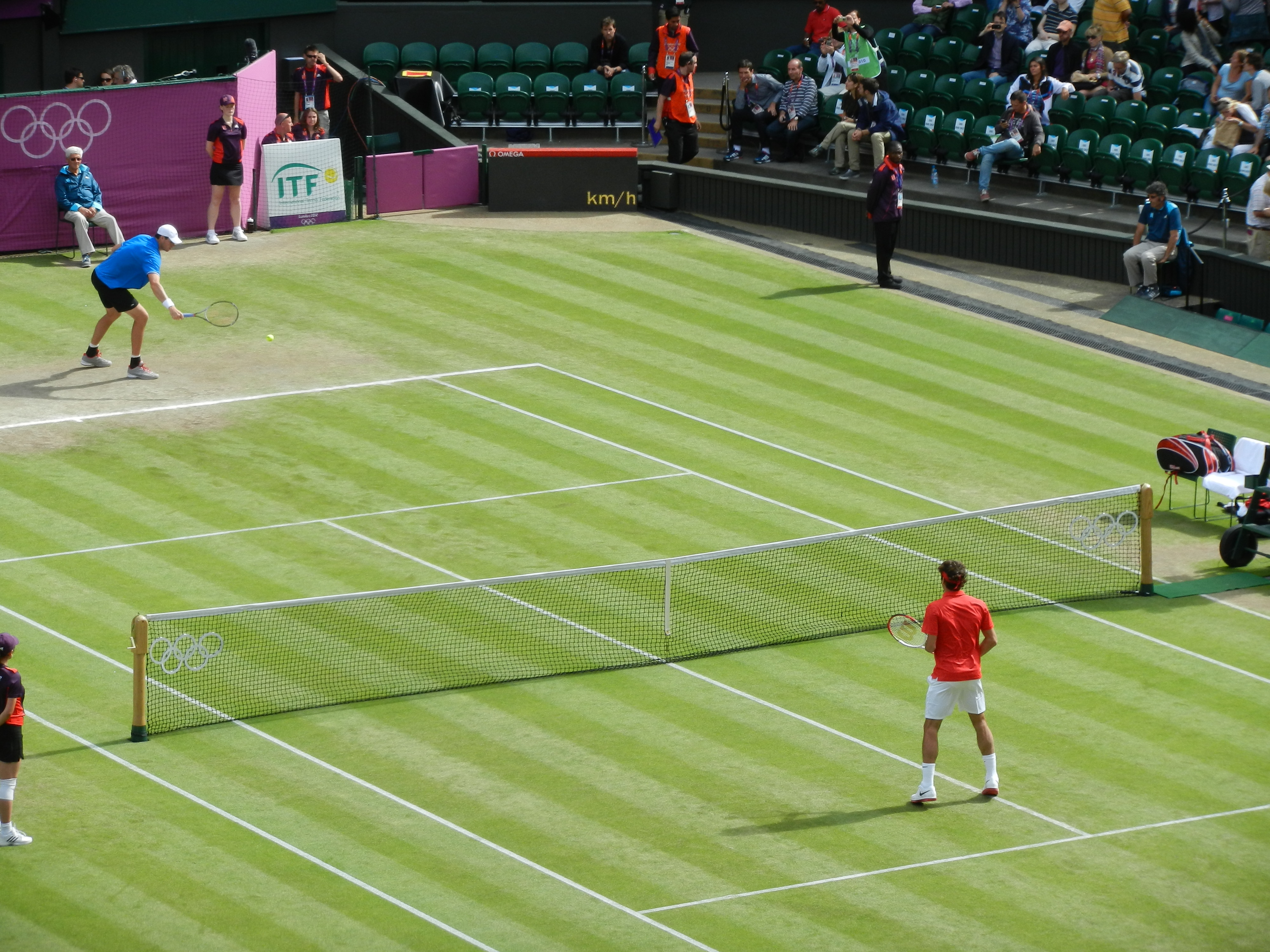
- John Isner (United States) and Roger Federer (Switzerland) warming up for their quarterfinal match on Centre Court.
- Venue: All England Club, Wimbledon
- Dates: 28 July–5 August 2012
- Competitors: 64 from 34 nations

Medalists
1st place, gold medalist(s)		Andy Murray; Great Britain
2nd place, silver medalist(s)		Roger Federer; Switzerland
3rd place, bronze medalist(s)		Juan Martín del Potro; Argentina

Great Britain's Andy Murray defeated Switzerland's Roger Federer in the final, 6–2, 6–1, 6–4 to win the gold medal in men's singles tennis at the 2012 Summer Olympics. The final was a rematch of the Wimbledon final played at the same venue four weeks prior, in which Federer prevailed. Federer was attempting to become the third man to complete the career Golden Slam in singles (after Andre Agassi and Rafael Nadal). It was Federer's third consecutive Olympics as the singles world No. 1, but his silver finish remains his only Olympic medal in singles. In the bronze medal match, Argentina's Juan Martín del Potro defeated Serbia's Novak Djokovic, 7–5, 6–4. Murray's gold was Great Britain's first medal at the event since 1908, and the nation's record fourth overall. Federer's silver was Switzerland's first medal at the event since 1992. Del Potro's bronze was Argentina's first medal at the event overall.

The tournament was held at the All England Club in Wimbledon, London from 28 July to 5 August, making it the first Olympic grass court tournament since tennis was re-introduced to the Games. The event was run and organised by the International Olympic Committee (IOC) and the International Tennis Federation (ITF), and was part of the Association of Tennis Professionals tour. Matches were the best-of-three sets, except for the final which was the best-of-five sets. Tie-breaks were in use for all sets except the fifth set of the final and the third set of all other matches. There were 64 players from 34 nations.

Rafael Nadal was the reigning gold medalist from 2008, but withdrew due to a recurring knee injury. Despite his early exit at Wimbledon the previous month, Nadal was the pre-Olympics favourite to retain his Gold Medal.

The second-round match between Jo-Wilfried Tsonga and Milos Raonic lasted 3 hours and 57 minutes and 66 games, with the third set ending at 25–23. This was (then) the longest tennis match in Olympic history, in terms of games played and in time, under the best-of-three-sets system. However, this record was quickly eclipsed by Federer and del Potro three days later in a semifinal encounter that lasted 4 hours 26 minutes, with the third set ending at 19–17. This was both the longest singles tennis match in Olympic history (played with the best-of-three-sets format) and the longest such match in the Open Era, surpassing the 4 hours 3 minutes in Nadal's victory over Djokovic at the 2009 Madrid Masters.

== Background ==
This was the 14th (medal) appearance of the men's singles tennis event. The event has been held at every Summer Olympics where tennis has been on the program: from 1896 to 1924 and then from 1988 to the current program. Demonstration events were held in 1968 and 1984.

The number one seed was Roger Federer of Switzerland, making his fourth Olympic appearance and second as the top seed. Reigning champion Rafael Nadal of Spain was out with a knee injury, though Spain was still represented among the top-four seeds with David Ferrer. Serb Novak Djokovic and Briton Andy Murray made up the rest of the top seeds. Djokovic had taken bronze in 2008; the other two quarterfinalists from that tournament to return were Federer and Jürgen Melzer of Austria.

Bulgaria, Colombia, Kazakhstan, Slovenia, Tunisia, and Ukraine each made their debut in the event. France made its 13th appearance, most among all nations, having missed only the 1904 event.

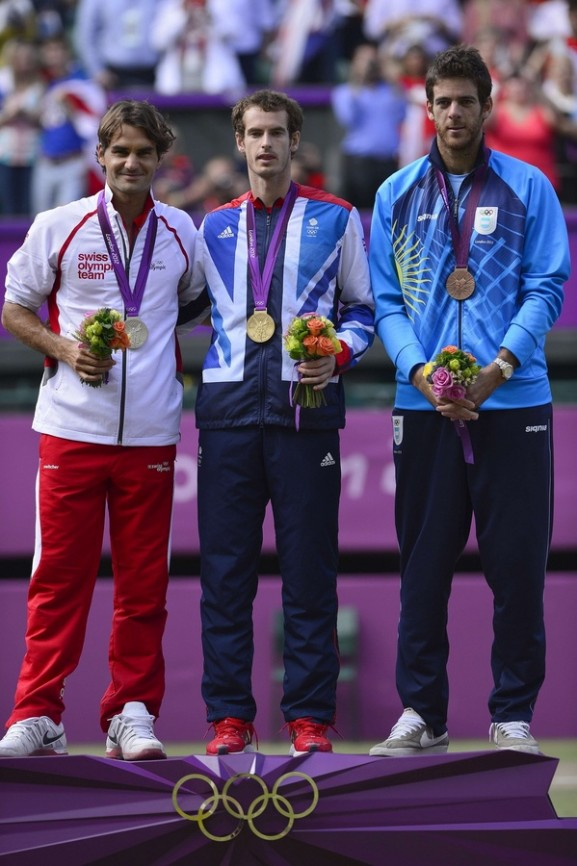
Men’s singles medalists

== Qualification ==
Qualification for the men's singles was primarily through the ATP ranking list of 11 June 2012. An additional restriction was that players had to have been available for two Davis Cup events between 2009 and 2012. Nations had been limited to four players in the event since the 2000 Games. There were 64 quota places available for men's singles. The first 56 were assigned through the world ranking. There were two Tripartite Commission invitation places and 6 final qualification places allocated by the ITF based on continental and national representation along with world rankings.

== Competition format ==
The competition was a single-elimination tournament with a bronze medal match. Matches were in best-of-3 sets, except for the final which was in best-of-5 sets. No tiebreak was played in the final set.

== Schedule ==
The tournament ran from 28 July and 5 August.

July				August				
28	29	30	31	1	2	3	4	5
11:30	11:30	11:30	11:30	11:30	11:30	12:00		12:00
Round of 64		Round of 64; Round of 32	Round of 32	Round of 16	Quarter-finals	Semi-finals	—	Bronze medal match Gold medal match

== Seeds ==
1. Roger Federer (SUI) (Runner-up, silver medalist)
2. Novak Djokovic (SRB) (semifinals, fourth place)
3. Andy Murray (GBR) (champion, gold medalist)
4. David Ferrer (ESP) (third round)
5. Jo-Wilfried Tsonga (FRA) (quarterfinals)
6. Tomáš Berdych (CZE) (first round)
7. Janko Tipsarević (SRB) (third round)
8. Juan Martín del Potro (ARG) (semifinals, bronze medalist)
9. Juan Mónaco (ARG) (second round)
10. John Isner (USA) (quarterfinals)
11. Nicolás Almagro (ESP) (quarterfinals)
12. Gilles Simon (FRA) (third round)
13. Marin Čilić (CRO) (second round)
14. Fernando Verdasco (ESP) (first round)
15. Kei Nishikori (JPN) (quarterfinals)
16. Richard Gasquet (FRA) (second round)

Click on the seed number of a player to go to their draw section.

== Draw ==
Key

- Q = Qualifier
- WC = Wild card
- LL = Lucky loser
- Alt = Alternate
- ITF = ITF entry
- PR = Protected ranking
- SR = Special ranking
- SE = Special exempt
- JE = Junior exempt
- JR = Junior Accelerator Programme entrant
- CO = College Accelerator Programme entrant
- NG = Next Gen Accelerator Program entrant
- w/o = Walkover
- r = Retired
- d = Defaulted
- INV = Tripartite Invitation
- IP = ITF place

=== Finals ===
Quarter-finals
1	Roger Federer (SUI)	6	7^{7}
10	John Isner (USA)	4	6^{5}
15	Kei Nishikori (JPN)	4	6^{4}
8	Juan Martín del Potro (ARG)	6	7^{7}
11	Nicolás Almagro (ESP)	4	1
3	Andy Murray (GBR)	6	6
5	Jo-Wilfried Tsonga (FRA)	1	5
2	Novak Djokovic (SRB)	6	7

Semi-finals
1	Roger Federer (SUI)	3	7^{7}	19
8	Juan Martín del Potro (ARG)	6	6^{5}	17
3	Andy Murray (GBR)	7	7
2	Novak Djokovic (SRB)	5	5

Final (gold medal match)
1	Roger Federer (SUI)	2	1	4
3	Andy Murray (GBR)	6	6	6
Bronze medal match
8	Juan Martín del Potro (ARG)	7	6
2	Novak Djokovic (SRB)	5	4

=== Top half ===
==== Section 1 ====
First round
1	R Federer (SUI)	6	5	6
A Falla (COL)	3	7	3
J Benneteau (FRA)	7	6
M Youzhny (RUS)	5	3
IP	A Ungur (ROU)	3	3
G Müller (LUX)	6	6
D Istomin (UZB)	6	7^{11}
14	F Verdasco (ESP)	4	6^{9}
10	J Isner (USA)	7^{7}	6
O Rochus (BEL)	6^{1}	4
Y-h Lu (TPE)	6^{10}	6	3
IP	M Jaziri (TUN)	7^{12}	4	6
L Lacko (SVK)	6^{5}	1
Alt	P Petzschner (GER)	7^{7}	6
D Nalbandian (ARG)	3	4
7	J Tipsarević (SRB)	6	6

Second round
1	R Federer (SUI)	6	6
J Benneteau (FRA)	2	2
G Müller (LUX)	7^{7}	6^{3}	5
D Istomin (UZB)	6^{4}	7^{7}	7
10	J Isner (USA)	7^{7}	6
IP	M Jaziri (TUN)	6^{1}	2
Alt	P Petzschner (GER)	6	3	4
7	J Tipsarević (SRB)	3	6	6

Third round
1	R Federer (SUI)	7	6
D Istomin (UZB)	5	3
10	J Isner (USA)	7	7^{16}
7	J Tipsarević (SRB)	5	6^{14}

Quarter-finals
1	R Federer (SUI)	6	7^{7}
10	J Isner (USA)	4	6^{5}

==== Section 2 ====
First round
4	D Ferrer (ESP)	6	6
IP	V Pospisil (CAN)	4	4
Alt	V Vardhan (IND)	3	2
IP	B Kavčič (SLO)	6	6
R Štěpánek (CZE)	4	3
N Davydenko (RUS)	6	6
B Tomic (AUS)	6^{4}	6^{4}
15	K Nishikori (JPN)	7^{7}	7^{7}
12	G Simon (FRA)	6	6
M Kukushkin (KAZ)	4	2
Ł Kubot (POL)	3	6^{4}
G Dimitrov (BUL)	6	7^{7}
A Seppi (ITA)	6	6
D Young (USA)	4	4
I Dodig (CRO)	4	1
8	JM del Potro (ARG)	6	6

Second round
4	D Ferrer (ESP)	6	6
IP	B Kavčič (SLO)	2	2
N Davydenko (RUS)	6	4	1
15	K Nishikori (JPN)	4	6	6
12	G Simon (FRA)	6	6
G Dimitrov (BUL)	3	3
A Seppi (ITA)	3	6^{2}
8	JM del Potro (ARG)	6	7^{7}

Third round
4	D Ferrer (ESP)	0	6	4
15	K Nishikori (JPN)	6	3	6
12	G Simon (FRA)	1	6	3
8	JM del Potro (ARG)	6	4	6

Quarter-finals
15	K Nishikori (JPN)	4	6^{4}
8	JM del Potro (ARG)	6	7^{7}

=== Bottom half ===
==== Section 3 ====
First round
6	T Berdych (CZE)	4	4
S Darcis (BEL)	6	6
S Giraldo (COL)	7	6
R Harrison (USA)	5	3
A Bogomolov Jr. (RUS)	7	7^{7}
C Berlocq (ARG)	5	6^{5}
V Troicki (SRB)	4	6^{3}
11	N Almagro (ESP)	6	7^{7}
16	R Gasquet (FRA)	6	6
R Haase (NED)	3	3
G Soeda (JPN)	7^{8}	6^{5}	2
M Baghdatis (CYP)	6^{6}	7^{7}	6
IP	S Devvarman (IND)	3	1
J Nieminen (FIN)	6	6
S Wawrinka (SUI)	3	3
3	A Murray (GBR)	6	6

Second round
S Darcis (BEL)	6^{4}	6	6
S Giraldo (COL)	7^{7}	4	4
A Bogomolov Jr. (RUS)	2	2
11	N Almagro (ESP)	6	6
16	R Gasquet (FRA)	4	4
M Baghdatis (CYP)	6	6
J Nieminen (FIN)	2	4
3	A Murray (GBR)	6	6

Third round
S Darcis (BEL)	5	3
11	N Almagro (ESP)	7	6
M Baghdatis (CYP)	6	1	4
3	A Murray (GBR)	4	6	6

Quarter-finals
11	N Almagro (ESP)	4	1
3	A Murray (GBR)	6	6

==== Section 4 ====
First round
5	J-W Tsonga (FRA)	6^{5}	6	6
IP	T Bellucci (BRA)	7^{7}	4	4
T Ito (JPN)	3	4
M Raonic (CAN)	6	6
D Tursunov (RUS)	7^{7}	2	7
F López (ESP)	6^{5}	6	9
D Goffin (BEL)	4	1
9	J Mónaco (ARG)	6	6
13	M Čilić (CRO)	7^{7}	6
J Melzer (AUT)	6^{5}	2
IP	L Hewitt (AUS)	6	4	6
IP	S Stakhovsky (UKR)	3	6	3
A Roddick (USA)	7	6
M Kližan (SVK)	5	4
F Fognini (ITA)	7^{9}	2	2
2	N Djokovic (SRB)	6^{7}	6	6

Second round
5	J-W Tsonga (FRA)	6	3	25
M Raonic (CAN)	3	6	23
F López (ESP)	6	6
9	J Mónaco (ARG)	4	4
13	M Čilić (CRO)	4	5
IP	L Hewitt (AUS)	6	7
A Roddick (USA)	2	1
2	N Djokovic (SRB)	6	6

Third round
5	J-W Tsonga (FRA)	7^{7}	6
F López (ESP)	6^{5}	4
IP	L Hewitt (AUS)	6	5	1
2	N Djokovic (SRB)	4	7	6

Quarter-finals
5	J-W Tsonga (FRA)	1	5
2	N Djokovic (SRB)	6	7

== See also ==
- Longest tennis match records
