= Tennis at the 2012 Summer Olympics – Mixed doubles =

Mixed doubles
- Tennis at the 2012 Summer Olympics

Final
- Champions: (Belarus) Victoria Azarenka; (Belarus) Max Mirnyi
- Runners-up: (United Kingdom) Laura Robson; (United Kingdom) Andy Murray
- Score: 2–6, 6–3, [10–8]

Events
Singles	men	women
Doubles	men	women	mixed
Qualification
- Summer Olympics

Mixed doubles tennis at the Games of the XXX Olympiad
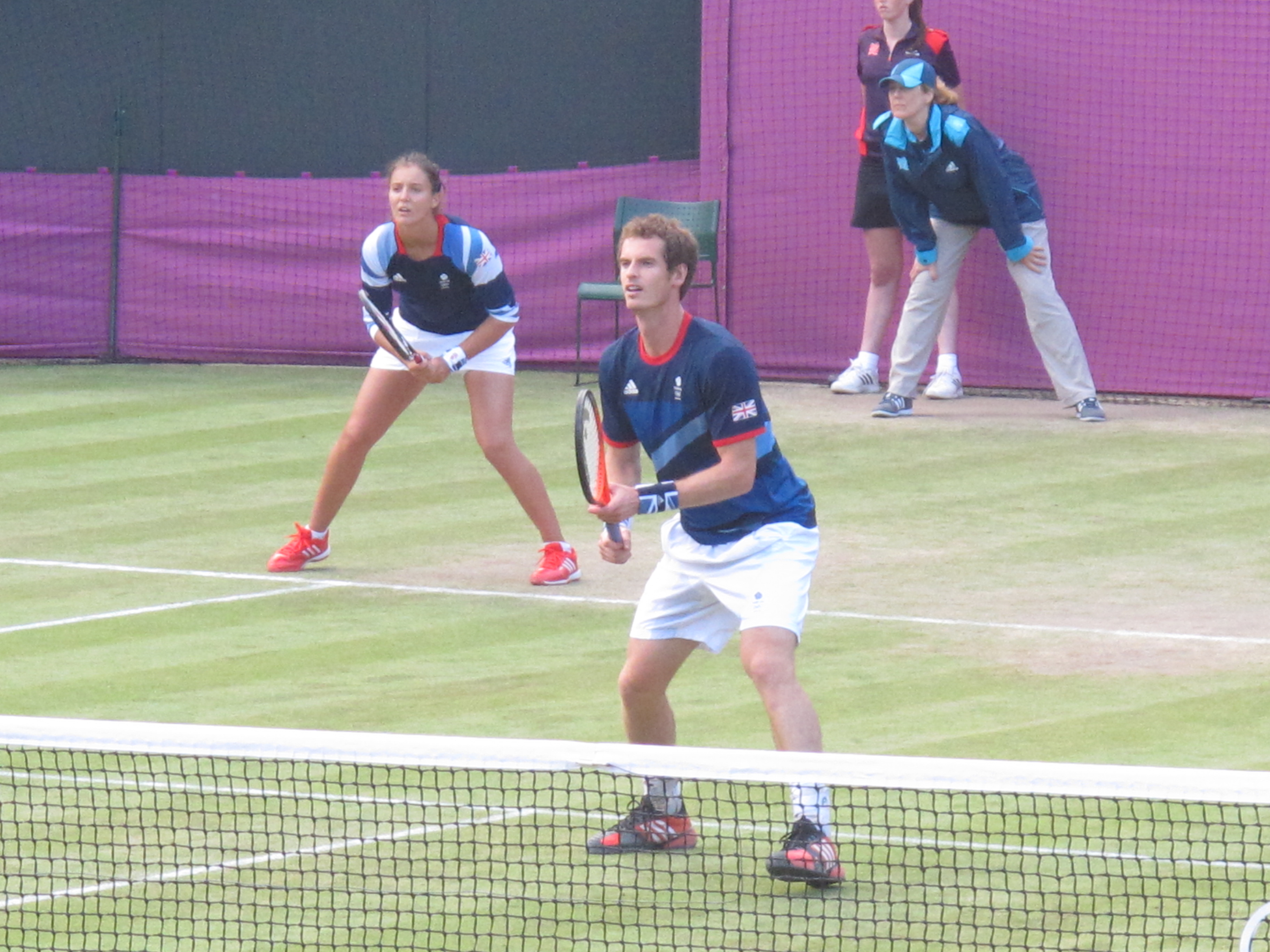
- Silver medalists Laura Robson and Andy Murray during a match
- Venue: All England Lawn Tennis and Croquet Club
- Dates: 1 August to 5 August 2012
- Competitors: 32 from 13 nations
- Teams: 16

Medalists
1st place, gold medalist(s)		Belarus: Victoria Azarenka; Max Mirnyi
2nd place, silver medalist(s)		Great Britain: Laura Robson; Andy Murray
3rd place, bronze medalist(s)		United States: Lisa Raymond; Mike Bryan

Belarus' Victoria Azarenka and Max Mirnyi defeated Great Britain's Laura Robson and Andy Murray in the final, 2–6, 6–3, [10–8] to win the gold medal in mixed doubles tennis at the 2012 Summer Olympics. In the bronze medal match, the United States' Lisa Raymond and Mike Bryan defeated Germany's Sabine Lisicki and Christopher Kas, 6–3, 4–6, [10–4].

The tournament was held from 1 to 5 August on the grass courts of the All England Lawn Tennis and Croquet Club in Wimbledon, London. This was the first time mixed doubles was included in the Olympic tennis programme since Paris in 1924, where Hazel Wightman and Richard Williams won gold. 32 players (16 pairs) from 13 nations competed.

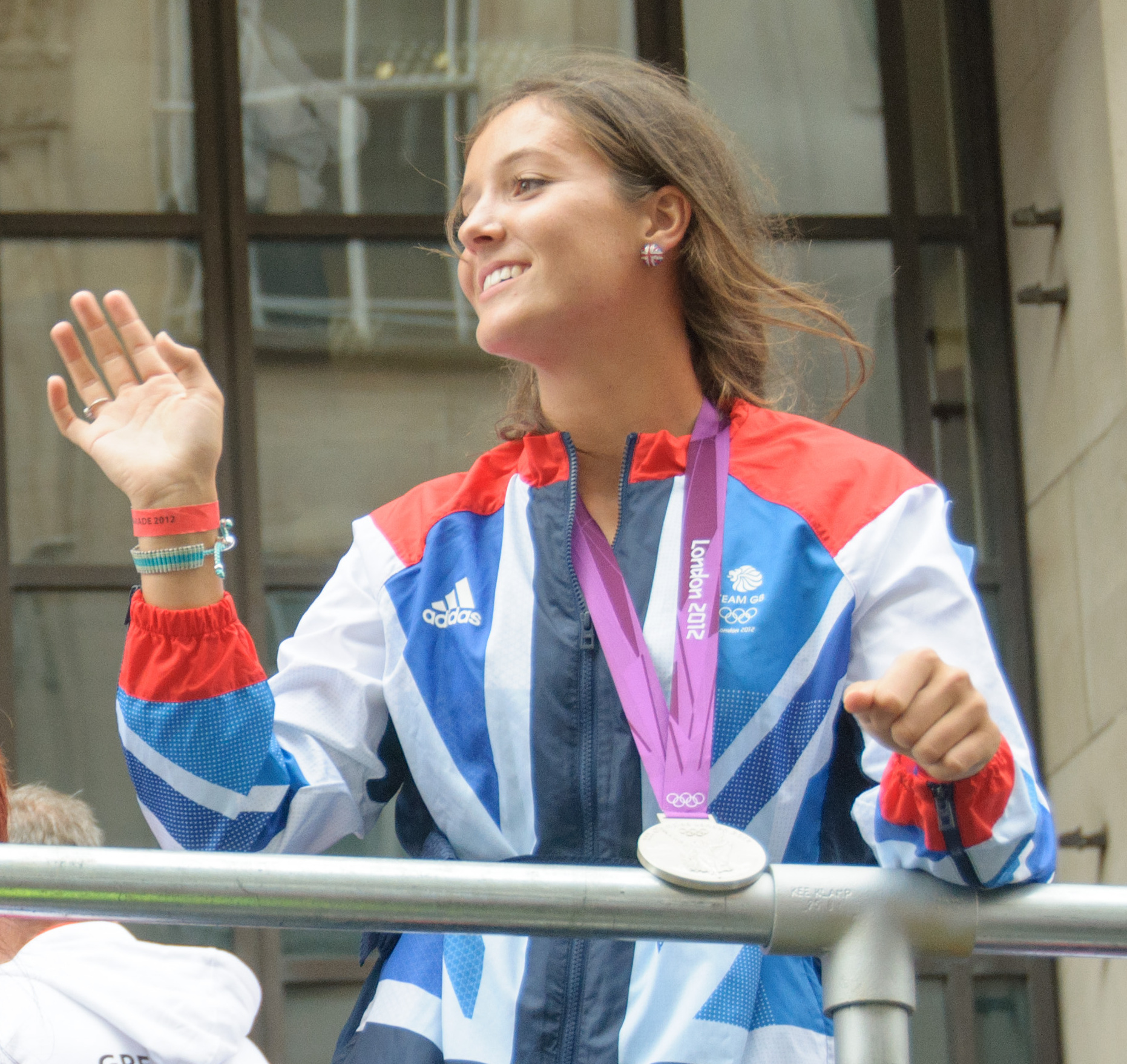
Laura Robson with her silver medal

== Background ==
This was the fifth appearance of mixed doubles tennis. The event was first held in 1900 and would not be held again until 1912 (when both outdoor and indoor versions were held); it would then be held the next two Games in 1920 and 1924. Tennis was not a medal sport from 1928 to 1984, though there were demonstration events in 1968 (which included mixed doubles) and 1984 (which did not). Mixed doubles did not return with the rest of the tennis programme in 1988; instead, it was not until 2012 that mixed doubles returned to the programme, where it has been since.

Belarus's Max Mirnyi was a top doubles specialist with six Grand Slam titles but no Olympic medals, as the country had no other top level male doubles player and the mixed doubles had not been played at the Olympics since 1924. Victoria Azarenka was the world #1 women's singles player with strong experience in doubles. The pair had won the 2007 US Open – Mixed doubles together and were the top seeds coming into the return of the event at the 2012 Olympics. The other seeded teams were the two American pairs (with the Bryan brothers playing with Liezel Huber and Lisa Raymond) and Polish duo Agnieszka Radwańska and Marcin Matkowski.

Argentina, Australia, Belarus, the Czech Republic, Poland, Russia, and Serbia each made their mixed doubles debut. Great Britain and Sweden each competed for the fourth time, matching the absent France for most appearances among nations.

== Qualification ==
The main qualifying criteria were the ATP and WTA ranking lists as of 11 June 2012. The players entering were formally submitted by the International Tennis Federation. The ATP and WTA rankings were based on performances from the previous 52 weeks, and there were several tournaments in the two-month period between the time of the rankings being frozen for entry and the beginning of the tennis events at the Olympics. Players must have also made themselves available for two Fed/Davis Cup events from 2009 to 2012, one of which must have taken place in 2011–2012, and had a good standing with their National Olympic Committee.

Each National Olympic Committee (NOC) could enter up to six men and six women athletes, with a maximum of four entries in the individual events, and two pairs in the doubles events. Any player in the world's top 56 was eligible, and NOCs had the option to enter players of a lower rank. Athletes were able to compete in both singles and doubles events. Doubles players within the top 10 doubles rankings on 11 June were eligible to bring any player provided that player had any doubles or singles ranking, and as long as the number of players from the same country did not surpass the total of six.

== Competition format ==
The competition was a single-elimination tournament with a bronze medal match. All matches were best-of-three sets. Tie-breaks were used for the first two sets of each match. If the score was tied at one set all, a 'super tie-break' (the first pairing to win at least 10 points by a margin of two points) would be used.

== Schedule ==
Matches took place between 1 and 5 August.

August
1	2	3	4	5
11:30	11:30	12:00	12:00	12:00
Round of 16		Quarterfinals	Quarterfinals; Semifinals	Bronze medal match Gold medal match

== Seeds ==
1. Victoria Azarenka (BLR) / Max Mirnyi (BLR) (Winners, gold medalists)
2. Liezel Huber (USA) / Bob Bryan (USA) (first round)
3. Lisa Raymond (USA) / Mike Bryan (USA) (semifinals, bronze medalists)
4. Agnieszka Radwańska (POL) / Marcin Matkowski (POL) (first round)

== Draw ==
=== Key ===
- INV = Tripartite Invitation
- IP = ITF place
- Alt = Alternate
- w/o = Walkover
- r = Retired
- d = Defaulted

=== Bracket ===
First round
1	V Azarenka (BLR); M Mirnyi (BLR)	6	6
A Kerber (GER); P Petzschner (GER)	2	2
S Mirza (IND); L Paes (IND)	6	6
A Ivanovic (SRB); N Zimonjić (SRB)	2	4
3	L Raymond (USA); M Bryan (USA)	7	6
S Errani (ITA); A Seppi (ITA)	5	3
G Dulko (ARG); JM del Potro (ARG)	6	7
IP	E Vesnina (RUS); M Youzhny (RUS)	3	5
IP	L Robson (GBR); A Murray (GBR)	7	6^{7}	[10]
L Hradecká (CZE); R Štěpánek (CZE)	5	7^{9}	[7]
IP	S Stosur (AUS); L Hewitt (AUS)	6	6
4	A Radwańska (POL); M Matkowski (POL)	3	3
IP	S Arvidsson (SWE); R Lindstedt (SWE)	3	6	[8]
R Vinci (ITA); D Bracciali (ITA)	6	4	[10]
S Lisicki (GER); C Kas (GER)	7^{7}	6^{5}	[10]
2	L Huber (USA); B Bryan (USA)	6^{5}	7^{7}	[5]

Quarterfinals
1	V Azarenka (BLR); M Mirnyi (BLR)	7	7^{7}
S Mirza (IND); L Paes (IND)	5	6^{5}
3	L Raymond (USA); M Bryan (USA)	6	7
G Dulko (ARG); JM del Potro (ARG)	2	5
IP	L Robson (GBR); A Murray (GBR)	6	3	[10]
IP	S Stosur (AUS); L Hewitt (AUS)	3	6	[8]
R Vinci (ITA); D Bracciali (ITA)	6	6^{2}	[7]
S Lisicki (GER); C Kas (GER)	4	7^{7}	[10]

Semifinals
1	V Azarenka (BLR); M Mirnyi (BLR)	3	6	[10]
3	L Raymond (USA); M Bryan (USA)	6	4	[7]
IP	L Robson (GBR); A Murray (GBR)	6	6^{7}	[10]
S Lisicki (GER); C Kas (GER)	1	7^{9}	[7]

Final
1	V Azarenka (BLR); M Mirnyi (BLR)	2	6	[10]
IP	L Robson (GBR); A Murray (GBR)	6	3	[8]
Bronze medal match
3	L Raymond (USA); M Bryan (USA)	6	4	[10]
S Lisicki (GER); C Kas (GER)	3	6	[4]
