= Tennis at the 2012 Summer Olympics – Women's doubles =

Women's doubles
- Tennis at the 2012 Summer Olympics

Final
- Champions: (United States) Serena Williams; (United States) Venus Williams
- Runners-up: (Czech Republic) Andrea Hlaváčková; (Czech Republic) Lucie Hradecká
- Score: 6–4, 6–4

Events
Singles	men	women
Doubles	men	women	mixed
Qualification
- Summer Olympics

Women's doubles tennis at the Games of the XXX Olympiad
- Venue: All England Club, Wimbledon
- Date: 28 July to 5 August 2012
- Competitors: 62 from 21 nations

Medalists
1st place, gold medalist(s)		Serena Williams; Venus Williams	United States
2nd place, silver medalist(s)		Andrea Hlaváčková; Lucie Hradecká	Czech Republic
3rd place, bronze medalist(s)		Maria Kirilenko; Nadia Petrova	Russia

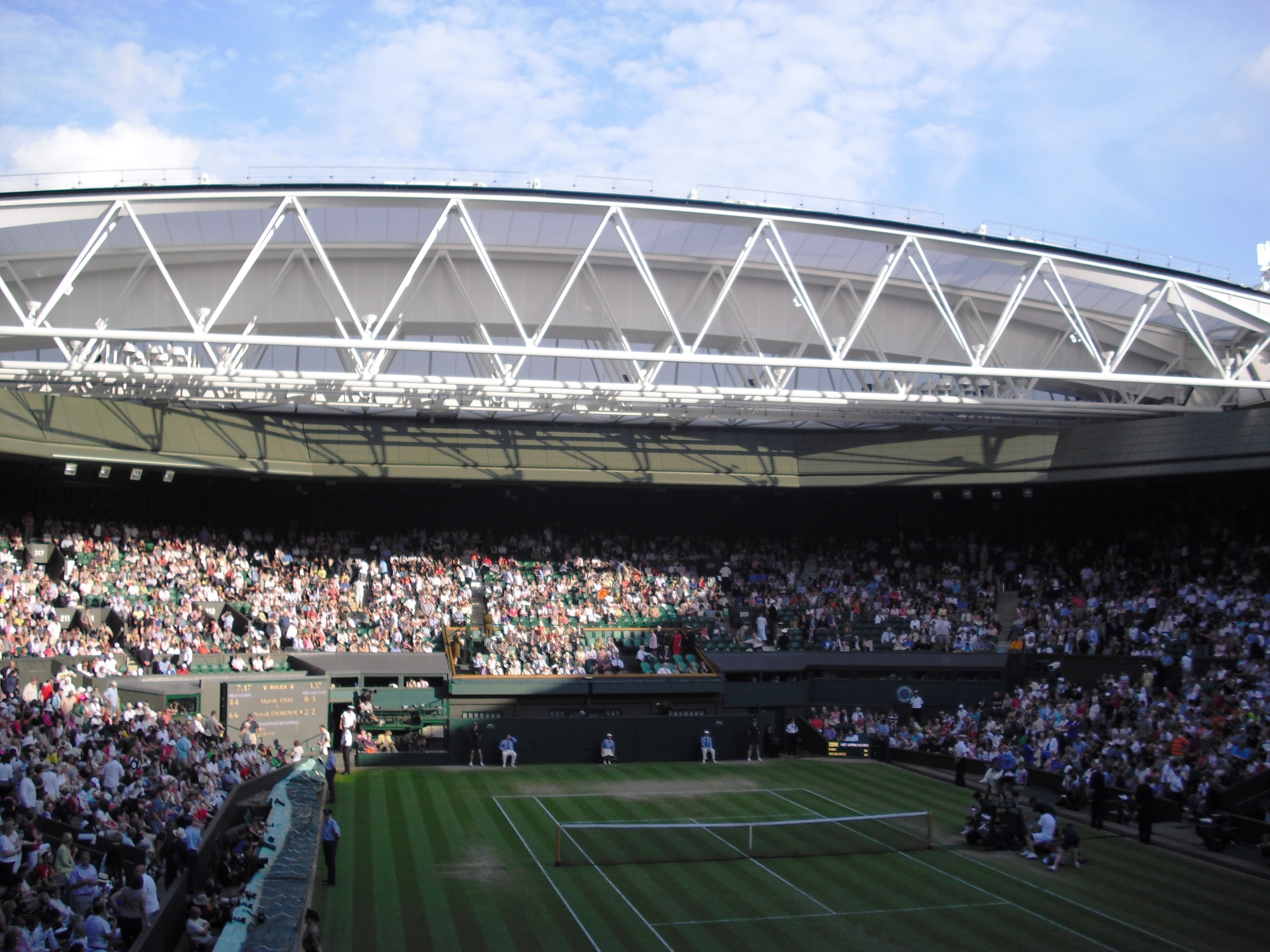
Centre Court Wimbledon 2009

Defending gold medalists Serena Williams and Venus Williams of the United States successfully defended their title, defeating the Czech Republic's Andrea Hlaváčková and Lucie Hradecká in the final, 6–4, 6–4 to win the gold medal in Women's Doubles tennis at the 2012 Summer Olympics. The Williams sisters did not drop a set en route to their third gold medal in doubles, becoming the first players in tennis history to win four Olympic gold medals, with the pairing also winning the doubles golds in 2000 and 2008, and Venus winning the 2000 singles and Serena winning the 2012 singles events. In the bronze medal match, Russia's Maria Kirilenko and Nadia Petrova defeated the United States' Liezel Huber and Lisa Raymond, 4–6, 6–4, 6–1.

The tournament was held from 28 July to 5 August on the grass courts of the All England Lawn Tennis and Croquet Club in Wimbledon, London of the United Kingdom.

All matches were the best of three sets, with tie-breaks used for the first two sets of each match.

== Calendar ==
July				August				
28	29	30	31	1	2	3	4	5
11:30	11:30	11:30	11:30	11:30	11:30	12:00	12:00	12:00
Round of 32		Round of 32; Round of 16	Round of 16	Round of 16; Quarterfinals	Quarterfinals	Semifinals		Bronze medal match Gold medal match

== Seeds ==
The top seeded team received a bye into the second round.

1. Liezel Huber (USA) / Lisa Raymond (USA) (semifinals, fourth place)
2. Sara Errani (ITA) / Roberta Vinci (ITA) (quarterfinals)
3. Maria Kirilenko (RUS) / Nadia Petrova (RUS) (semifinals, bronze medalists)
4. Andrea Hlaváčková (CZE) / Lucie Hradecká (CZE) (final, silver medalists)
5. Angelique Kerber (GER) / Sabine Lisicki (GER) (second round)
6. Ekaterina Makarova (RUS) / Elena Vesnina (RUS) (quarterfinals)
7. Flavia Pennetta (ITA) / Francesca Schiavone (ITA) (second round)
8. Nuria Llagostera Vives (ESP) / María José Martínez Sánchez (ESP) (second round)

== Draw ==
=== Key ===
- INV = Tripartite invitation
- IP = ITF place
- Alt = Alternate
- w/o = Walkover
- r = Retired
- d = Defaulted

=== Finals ===
Semi-finals
1	Liezel Huber (USA); Lisa Raymond (USA)	1	6^{2}
4	Andrea Hlaváčková (CZE); Lucie Hradecká (CZE)	6	7^{7}
3	Maria Kirilenko (RUS); Nadia Petrova (RUS)	5	4
Serena Williams (USA); Venus Williams (USA)	7	6

Final
4	Andrea Hlaváčková (CZE); Lucie Hradecká (CZE)	4	4
Serena Williams (USA); Venus Williams (USA)	6	6
Bronze medal match
1	Liezel Huber (USA); Lisa Raymond (USA)	6	4	1
3	Maria Kirilenko (RUS); Nadia Petrova (RUS)	4	6	6

=== Top half ===
First round
A Radwańska (POL); U Radwańska (POL)	6	6
D Cibulková (SVK); D Hantuchová (SVK)	2	1
J Görges (GER); A-L Grönefeld (GER)	6	6
IP	E Baltacha (GBR); A Keothavong (GBR)	3	1
J Gajdošová (AUS); A Rodionova (AUS)	1	4
6	E Makarova (RUS); E Vesnina (RUS)	6	6
4	A Hlaváčková (CZE); L Hradecká (CZE)	6	6^{5}	6
IP	T Babos (HUN); Á Szávay (HUN)	1	7^{7}	2
N Li (CHN); S Zhang (CHN)	6	6
G Dulko (ARG); P Suárez (ARG)	4	2
IP	R Chakravarthi (IND); S Mirza (IND)	1	6	1
IP	C-j Chuang (TPE); S-w Hsieh (TPE)	6	3	6
A Medina Garrigues (ESP); A Parra Santonja (ESP)	6^{4}	4
7	F Pennetta (ITA); F Schiavone (ITA)	7^{7}	6

Second round
1	L Huber (USA); L Raymond (USA)	6	7^{7}
A Radwańska (POL); U Radwańska (POL)	4	6^{3}
J Görges (GER); A-L Grönefeld (GER)	2	1
6	E Makarova (RUS); E Vesnina (RUS)	6	6
4	A Hlaváčková (CZE); L Hradecká (CZE)	6	6
N Li (CHN); S Zhang (CHN)	3	1
IP	C-j Chuang (TPE); S-w Hsieh (TPE)	6^{3}	7	6
7	F Pennetta (ITA); F Schiavone (ITA)	7^{7}	5	4

Quarter-finals
1	L Huber (USA); L Raymond (USA)	6	6
6	E Makarova (RUS); E Vesnina (RUS)	3	3
4	A Hlaváčková (CZE); L Hradecká (CZE)	6	6
IP	C-j Chuang (TPE); S-w Hsieh (TPE)	3	4

Semi-finals
1	L Huber (USA); L Raymond (USA)	1	6^{2}
4	A Hlaváčková (CZE); L Hradecká (CZE)	6	7^{7}

=== Bottom half ===
First round
8	N Llagostera Vives (ESP); MJ Martínez Sánchez (ESP)	6	6
C Dellacqua (AUS); S Stosur (AUS)	1	1
S Peng (CHN); J Zheng (CHN)	6	6^{3}	6
IP	A Cornet (FRA); K Mladenovic (FRA)	1	7^{7}	3
Y Shvedova (KAZ); G Voskoboeva (KAZ)	6	6
IP	S Dubois (CAN); A Wozniak (CAN)	2	0
K Jans-Ignacik (POL); A Rosolska (POL)	7^{7}	3	2
3	M Kirilenko (RUS); N Petrova (RUS)	6^{5}	6	6
5	A Kerber (GER); S Lisicki (GER)	1	6	6
IP	L Robson (GBR); H Watson (GBR)	6	4	3
S Cîrstea (ROU); S Halep (ROU)	3	2
S Williams (USA); V Williams (USA)	6	6
IP	M Chakhnashvili (GEO); A Tatishvili (GEO)	6^{0}	6	2
A Klepač (SLO); K Srebotnik (SLO)	7^{7}	3	6
P Cetkovská (CZE); L Šafářová (CZE)	2	3
2	S Errani (ITA); R Vinci (ITA)	6	6

Second round
8	N Llagostera Vives (ESP); MJ Martínez Sánchez (ESP)	4	2
S Peng (CHN); J Zheng (CHN)	6	6
Y Shvedova (KAZ); G Voskoboeva (KAZ)	3	2
3	M Kirilenko (RUS); N Petrova (RUS)	6	6
5	A Kerber (GER); S Lisicki (GER)	2	5
S Williams (USA); V Williams (USA)	6	7
A Klepač (SLO); K Srebotnik (SLO)	5	6	4
2	S Errani (ITA); R Vinci (ITA)	7	4	6

Quarter-finals
S Peng (CHN); J Zheng (CHN)	5	7^{7}	4
3	M Kirilenko (RUS); N Petrova (RUS)	7	6^{4}	6
S Williams (USA); V Williams (USA)	6	6
2	S Errani (ITA); R Vinci (ITA)	1	1

Semi-finals
3	M Kirilenko (RUS); N Petrova (RUS)	5	4
S Williams (USA); V Williams (USA)	7	6
