= Tennis at the 2012 Summer Olympics – Women's singles =

Women's singles
- Tennis at the 2012 Summer Olympics

Final
- Champion: (United States) Serena Williams
- Runner-up: (Russia) Maria Sharapova
- Score: 6–0, 6–1

Events
Singles	men	women
Doubles	men	women	mixed
Qualification
- Summer Olympics

Women's singles tennis at the Games of the XXX Olympiad
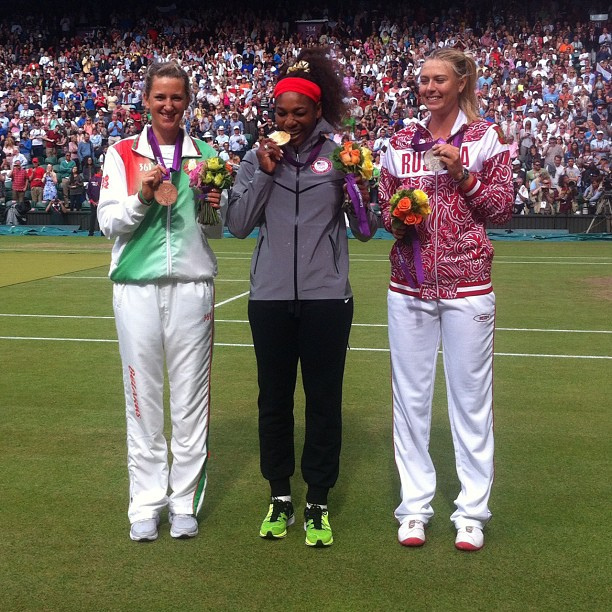
- Women's singles medalists
- Venue: All England Lawn Tennis and Croquet Club
- Dates: 28 July to 4 August 2012
- Competitors: 64 from 33 nations

Medalists
1st place, gold medalist(s)		Serena Williams	United States
2nd place, silver medalist(s)		Maria Sharapova	Russia
3rd place, bronze medalist(s)		Victoria Azarenka	Belarus

The United States' Serena Williams defeated Russia's Maria Sharapova in the final, 6–0, 6–1 to win the gold medal in women's singles tennis at the 2012 Summer Olympics. Both finalists were attempting to become the second woman (after Steffi Graf) to complete the career Golden Slam in singles. Williams won the gold, only weeks after winning the 2012 Wimbledon Championships, without losing a set, without losing more than three games in any set, and without losing more than five games in any match. Her serve was broken only once during the tournament (by Urszula Radwańska in the second round). She also became the first tennis player (male or female) to complete the career Golden Slam in both singles and doubles. It was the United States' first victory in the event since Serena's sister Venus Williams won in 2000, and its fifth gold overall. In the bronze medal match, Belarus' Victoria Azarenka defeated Russia's Maria Kirilenko, 6–3, 6–4.

The tournament was held at the All England Lawn Tennis and Croquet Club in Wimbledon, London from 28 July to 4 August 2012, and was the first Olympic grass court tournament since tennis was re-introduced to the Games. There were 64 competitors from 33 nations.

Elena Dementieva was the reigning gold medallist, having won in 2008, but she retired from the sport in 2010.

== Background ==
This was the 12th appearance of the women's singles tennis. A women's event was held only once during the first three Games (only men's tennis was played in 1896 and 1904), but has been held at every Olympics for which there was a tennis tournament since 1908. Tennis was not a medal sport from 1928 to 1984, though there were demonstration events in 1968 and 1984.

Returning from the 2008 Games were bronze medalist Vera Zvonareva of Russia, fourth-place finisher Li Na of China, and three quarterfinalists: Jelena Janković of Serbia and the Williams sisters, Venus and Serena. Venus was the 2000 Olympic champion, playing in her fourth Olympic singles tournament. Serena had won almost every tennis honor possible except the Olympic singles (the sisters had won women's doubles in 2000 and 2008, and would win again in London). The Russian team that swept the medals four years earlier had experienced nearly complete turnover; gold medalist Elena Dementieva had retired, silver medalist Dinara Safina was injured, and Svetlana Kuznetsova was slumping. This made room for Maria Sharapova, a major rival of Serena. Sharapova and Serena were seeded #3 and #4 behind world #1 Victoria Azarenka of Belarus and #2 Agnieszka Radwańska of Poland.

Georgia, Kazakhstan, and Liechtenstein each made their debut in the event. France made its 11th appearance, most among nations to that point, having missed only the 1908 Games in London (when only British players competed).

== Qualification ==
Qualification for the women's singles was primarily through the WTA ranking list of 11 June 2012. An additional restriction was that players had to have been available for two Billie Jean King Cup events between 2009 and 2012. Nations had been limited to four players in the event since the 2000 Games. There were 64 quota places available for women's singles. The first 56 were assigned through the world ranking. There were two Tripartite Commission invitation places and 6 final qualification places allocated by the ITF based on continental and national representation along with world rankings.

== Competition format ==
The competition was a single-elimination tournament with a bronze medal match. Matches were in best-of-3 sets. No tiebreak was played in the final set.

== Schedule ==
Matches took place between 28 July and 4 August.

July				August			
28	29	30	31	1	2	3	4
11:30	11:30	11:30	11:30	11:30	11:30	12:00	12:00
Round of 64		Round of 64; Round of 32	Round of 32	Round of 16	Quarter-finals	Semi-finals	Bronze medal match Gold medal match

== Seeds ==
1. Victoria Azarenka (BLR) (semifinals, bronze medalist)
2. Agnieszka Radwańska (POL) (first round)
3. Maria Sharapova (RUS) (final, silver medalist)
4. Serena Williams (USA) (Winner, gold medalist)
5. Samantha Stosur (AUS) (first round)
6. Petra Kvitová (CZE) (quarterfinals)
7. Angelique Kerber (GER) (quarterfinals)
8. Caroline Wozniacki (DEN) (quarterfinals)
9. Sara Errani (ITA) (first round)
10. Li Na (CHN) (first round)
11. Ana Ivanovic (SRB) (third round)
12. Dominika Cibulková (SVK) (first round)
13. Vera Zvonareva (RUS) (third round)
14. Maria Kirilenko (RUS) (semifinals, fourth place)
15. Sabine Lisicki (GER) (third round)
16. Nadia Petrova (RUS) (third round)

Click on the seed number of a player to go to their draw section.

== Draw ==
Key

- Q = Qualifier
- WC = Wild card
- LL = Lucky loser
- Alt = Alternate
- ITF = ITF entry
- PR = Protected ranking
- SR = Special ranking
- SE = Special exempt
- JE = Junior exempt
- JR = Junior Accelerator Programme entrant
- CO = College Accelerator Programme entrant
- NG = Next Gen Accelerator Program entrant
- w/o = Walkover
- r = Retired
- d = Defaulted
- INV = Tripartite Invitation
- IP = ITF place

=== Finals ===
Quarterfinals
1	Victoria Azarenka (BLR)	6	7
7	Angelique Kerber (GER)	4	5
4	Serena Williams (USA)	6	6
8	Caroline Wozniacki (DEN)	0	3
Kim Clijsters (BEL)	2	5
3	Maria Sharapova (RUS)	6	7
6	Petra Kvitová (CZE)	6^{3}	3
14	Maria Kirilenko (RUS)	7^{7}	6

Semifinals
1	Victoria Azarenka (BLR)	1	2
4	Serena Williams (USA)	6	6
3	Maria Sharapova (RUS)	6	6
14	Maria Kirilenko (RUS)	2	3

Final
4	Serena Williams (USA)	6	6
3	Maria Sharapova (RUS)	0	1
Bronze medal match
1	Victoria Azarenka (BLR)	6	6
14	Maria Kirilenko (RUS)	3	4

=== Top half ===
==== Section 1 ====
First round
1	V Azarenka (BLR)	6	3	6
I-C Begu (ROU)	1	6	1
MJ Martínez Sánchez (ESP)	6	6
P Hercog (SLO)	2	4
A Tatishvili (GEO)	6	6
INV	S Vogt (LIE)	2	0
J Zheng (CHN)	4	6^{7}
16	N Petrova (RUS)	6	7^{9}
9	S Errani (ITA)	3	1
V Williams (USA)	6	6
M Erakovic (NZL)	2	1
A Wozniak (CAN)	6	6
G Voskoboeva (KAZ)	4	2
T Babos (HUN)	6	6
P Cetkovská (CZE)	1	0^{r}
7	A Kerber (GER)	6	3

Second round
1	V Azarenka (BLR)	6	6
MJ Martínez Sánchez (ESP)	1	2
A Tatishvili (GEO)	3	7^{7}	2
16	N Petrova (RUS)	6	6^{5}	6
V Williams (USA)	6	6
A Wozniak (CAN)	1	3
T Babos (HUN)	1	1
7	A Kerber (GER)	6	6

Third round
1	V Azarenka (BLR)	7^{8}	6
16	N Petrova (RUS)	6^{6}	4
V Williams (USA)	6^{5}	6^{5}
7	A Kerber (GER)	7^{7}	7^{7}

Quarter-finals
1	V Azarenka (BLR)	6	7
7	A Kerber (GER)	4	5

==== Section 2 ====
First round
4	S Williams (USA)	6	6
J Janković (SRB)	3	1
M Barthel (GER)	4	3
U Radwańska (POL)	6	6
F Schiavone (ITA)	6	3	6
K Zakopalová (CZE)	3	6	4
S Arvidsson (SWE)	6^{3}	4
13	V Zvonareva (RUS)	7^{7}	6
10	N Li (CHN)	2	6	3
D Hantuchová (SVK)	6	3	6
IP	A Cornet (FRA)	7^{7}	6
T Paszek (AUT)	6^{4}	4
A Medina Garrigues (ESP)	2	6	5
Y Wickmayer (BEL)	6	4	7
IP	A Keothavong (GBR)	6	3	2
8	C Wozniacki (DEN)	4	6	6

Second round
4	S Williams (USA)	6	6
U Radwańska (POL)	2	3
F Schiavone (ITA)	3	3
13	V Zvonareva (RUS)	6	6
D Hantuchová (SVK)	6	6
IP	A Cornet (FRA)	3	0
Y Wickmayer (BEL)	4	6	3
8	C Wozniacki (DEN)	6	3	6

Third round
4	S Williams (USA)	6	6
13	V Zvonareva (RUS)	1	0
D Hantuchová (SVK)	4	2
8	C Wozniacki (DEN)	6	6

Quarter-finals
4	S Williams (USA)	6	6
8	C Wozniacki (DEN)	0	3

=== Bottom half ===
==== Section 3 ====
First round
5	S Stosur (AUS)	6	5	8
C Suárez Navarro (ESP)	3	7	10
K Clijsters (BEL)	6	6
R Vinci (ITA)	1	4
PR	Á Szávay (HUN)	3	3
IP	E Baltacha (GBR)	6	6
C McHale (USA)	4	5
11	A Ivanovic (SRB)	6	7
15	S Lisicki (GER)	4	6	7
IP	O Jabeur (TUN)	6	0	5
S Halep (ROU)	4	2
Y Shvedova (KAZ)	6	6
Alt	L Robson (GBR)	7^{7}	6
L Šafářová (CZE)	6^{4}	4
S Pe'er (ISR)	2	0
3	M Sharapova (RUS)	6	6

Second round
C Suárez Navarro (ESP)	3	3
K Clijsters (BEL)	6	6
IP	E Baltacha (GBR)	4	6^{5}
11	A Ivanovic (SRB)	6	7^{7}
15	S Lisicki (GER)	4	6	7
Y Shvedova (KAZ)	6	3	5
Alt	L Robson (GBR)	6^{5}	3
3	M Sharapova (RUS)	7^{7}	6

Third round
K Clijsters (BEL)	6	6
11	A Ivanovic (SRB)	3	4
15	S Lisicki (GER)	7^{10}	4	3
3	M Sharapova (RUS)	6^{8}	6	6

Quarter-finals
K Clijsters (BEL)	2	5
3	M Sharapova (RUS)	6	7

==== Section 4 ====
First round
6	P Kvitová (CZE)	6	5	6
K Bondarenko (UKR)	4	7	4
S-w Hsieh (TPE)	3	7^{7}	5
S Peng (CHN)	6	6^{3}	7
S Cîrstea (ROU)	2	6	2
F Pennetta (ITA)	6	4	6
T Pironkova (BUL)	7^{7}	6
12	D Cibulková (SVK)	6^{4}	2
14	M Kirilenko (RUS)	6	1
IP	M Duque Mariño (COL)	0	1^{r}
S Soler Espinosa (ESP)	2	2
IP	H Watson (GBR)	6	6
V Lepchenko (USA)	7	6^{6}	6
INV	V Cepede Royg (PAR)	5	7^{8}	2
J Görges (GER)	7	6^{5}	6
2	A Radwańska (POL)	5	7^{7}	4

Second round
6	P Kvitová (CZE)	7	2	6
S Peng (CHN)	5	6	1
F Pennetta (ITA)	7	6
T Pironkova (BUL)	5	1
14	M Kirilenko (RUS)	6	6
IP	H Watson (GBR)	3	2
V Lepchenko (USA)	3	5
J Görges (GER)	6	7

Third round
6	P Kvitová (CZE)	6	6
F Pennetta (ITA)	3	0
14	M Kirilenko (RUS)	7^{7}	6
J Görges (GER)	6^{5}	3

Quarter-finals
6	P Kvitová (CZE)	6^{3}	3
14	M Kirilenko (RUS)	7^{7}	6
