= Tennis at the 2012 Summer Olympics =

- Date: 28 July – 5 August 2012
- Edition: 16th
- Surface: Grass
- Location: All England Club, Wimbledon

Champions

Men's singles
- Andy Murray (GBR)

Women's singles
- Serena Williams (USA)

Men's doubles
- Mike Bryan & Bob Bryan (USA)

Women's doubles
- Serena Williams & Venus Williams (USA)

Mixed doubles
- Victoria Azarenka & Max Mirnyi (BLR)
- Summer Olympics

The tennis tournaments at the 2012 Summer Olympics in London were staged at the All England Club in Wimbledon, from 28 July to 5 August. This was the first Olympic grass court tournament since tennis was reintroduced as an Olympic sport and the first to be held at a Grand Slam venue in the Open era. Two other 2012 Summer Olympic bid finalists had also offered Grand Slam venues. Second-place finisher Paris offered the French Open venue, the Stade Roland Garros, which was also included in their successful 2024 bid. Meanwhile, fourth-place finisher New York City offered the US Open venue, the USTA Billie Jean King National Tennis Center in Flushing Meadows-Corona Park, Queens.

A total of 190 players competed in five events: singles and doubles for both men and women and, for the first time since 1924, mixed doubles were officially included. The Olympic tennis events were run and organised by the London Organising Committee of the Olympic Games (LOCOG) and the International Tennis Federation (ITF), and were part of the Association of Tennis Professionals (ATP) and Women's Tennis Association (WTA) tours. As a side effect, the regular rule imposed by the All England Club during The Championships calling for all-white player clothing was waived to allow players to wear Olympic national team clothing, and London 2012 bunting also mixed with the traditional Wimbledon green.

Elena Dementieva and Rafael Nadal were the reigning singles champions, neither of whom defended their titles. Dementieva had retired from professional tennis in 2010, while Nadal withdrew due to tendinitis.

== Summary ==
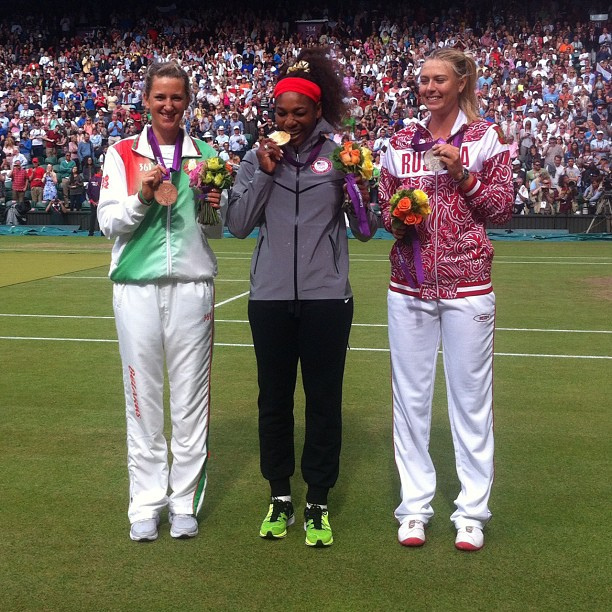
Woman’s singles medalists

In the women's singles tournament, Serena Williams defeated Maria Sharapova while losing only one game in the final for the gold medal and her sixth major event win at Wimbledon, having won the ladies' singles tournament at The Championships four weeks earlier as well as in 2002, 2003, 2009 and 2010. She also defended her women's doubles title alongside her sister Venus Williams, who had won singles gold in Sydney in 2000. With her singles gold, she became the second female player to win a career singles Golden Slam—Olympic gold in addition to the Australian Open, the French Open, Wimbledon and the US Open, with the first being Steffi Graf in 1988 after she won all five events that year (a feat not yet matched by another player, male or female.) Williams also became the first player in history, male or female, to win the career Golden Slam in both singles and doubles (the Williams sisters had already completed their career doubles Golden Slam at the 2001 Australian Open, joining Pam Shriver in Seoul in 1988 and Gigi Fernández at the 1993 Australian Open. However, Serena and Venus joined Gigi Fernández as the only three women to have completed the career doubles Golden Slam twice.) Furthermore, the Williams sisters also became the first four-time gold medalists in Olympic tennis history.

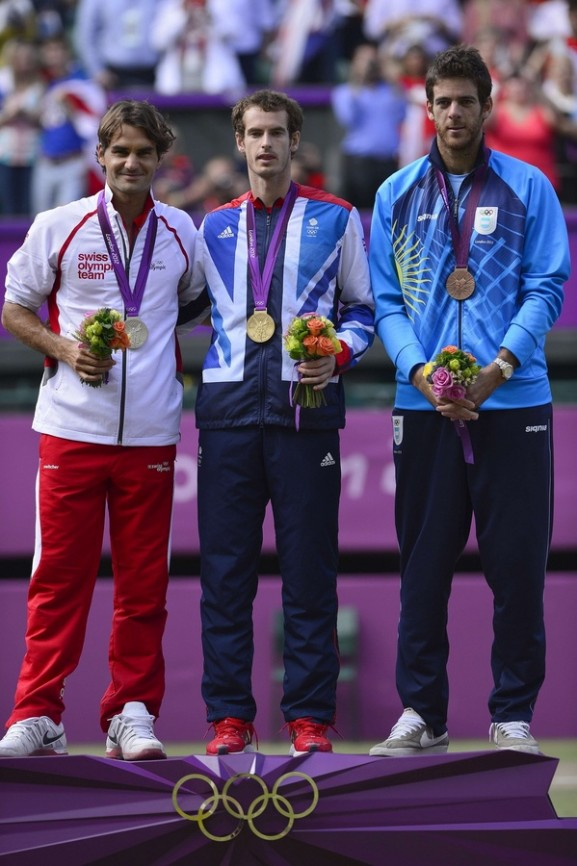
Men’s singles medalists

In the men's singles tournament final, Andy Murray beat Roger Federer in straight sets in front of a home crowd to avenge his four-set loss against Federer exactly four weeks earlier at the same place in the Wimbledon gentlemen's singles final. In doing so, he denied Federer the chance to become the third man to win a singles Career Golden Slam after Nadal at the 2010 US Open and Andre Agassi at the 1999 French Open. He also became the first British man to win singles tennis gold since Josiah Ritchie in 1908 (also at Wimbledon) and the first to win a major event at Wimbledon since Fred Perry won The Championships in 1936. Based on his gold medal as well as his achievements over the following four years, including a US Open championship, two Wimbledon championships and a Davis Cup, Team GB chose him as their flagbearer for the opening ceremony in Rio de Janeiro in 2016, where he won a second consecutive gold medal.

Meanwhile, the Bryan brothers (Mike and Bob) took the men's doubles gold for the United States and themselves completed a Career Golden Slam, joining the Australian "Woodies" (Todd Woodbridge and Mark Woodforde, who completed their set at the 2000 French Open) and Canada's Daniel Nestor at Wimbledon in 2009. Also, the Belarusian top seeds of Victoria Azarenka and Max Mirnyi took the mixed doubles gold after overcoming Murray and Laura Robson mere hours after Murray had defeated Federer.

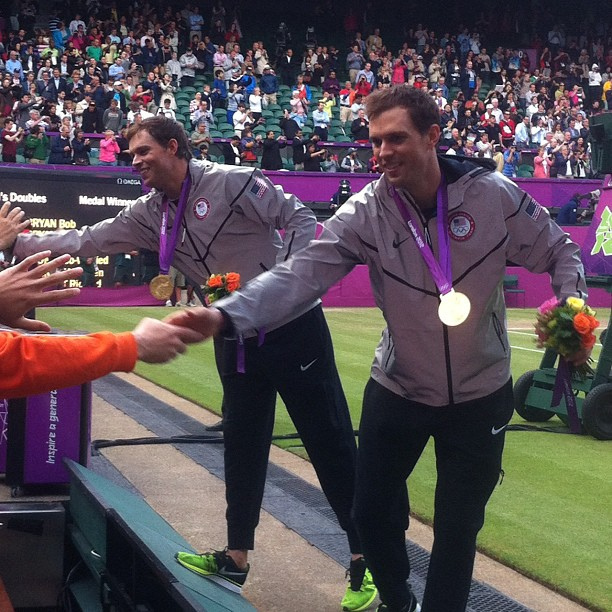
Men’s doubles gold medalists Bob Bryan and Mike Bryan

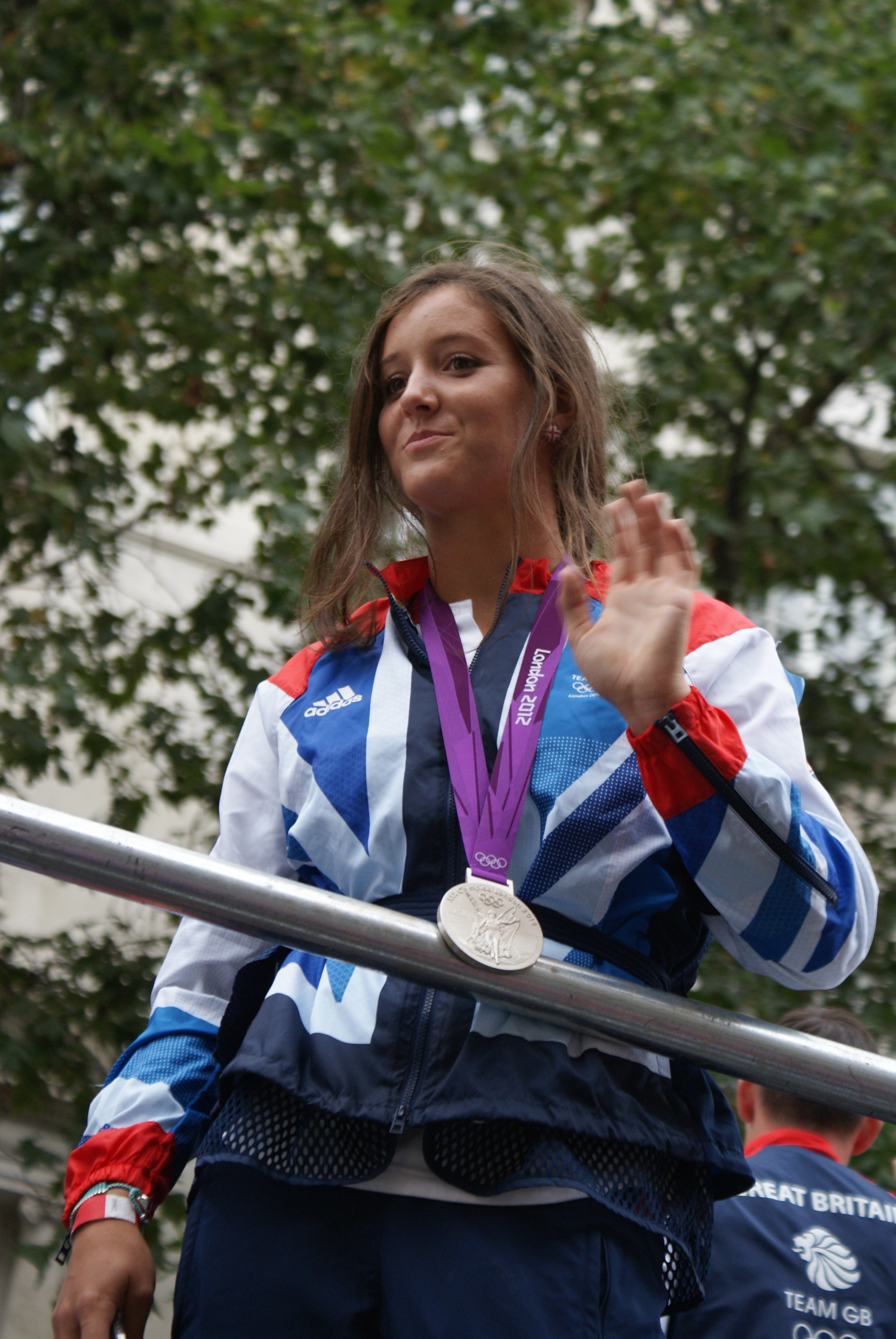
Mixed doubles silver medalist Laura Robson

== Medal summary ==
=== Events ===
Event	Gold	Silver	Bronze
Men's singles	Andy Murray; Great Britain	Roger Federer; Switzerland	Juan Martín del Potro; Argentina
Men's doubles	United States; Bob Bryan; Mike Bryan	France; Michaël Llodra; Jo-Wilfried Tsonga	France; Julien Benneteau; Richard Gasquet
Women's singles	Serena Williams; United States	Maria Sharapova; Russia	Victoria Azarenka; Belarus
Women's doubles	United States; Serena Williams; Venus Williams	Czech Republic; Andrea Hlaváčková; Lucie Hradecká	Russia; Maria Kirilenko; Nadia Petrova
Mixed doubles	Belarus; Victoria Azarenka; Max Mirnyi	Great Britain; Laura Robson; Andy Murray	United States; Lisa Raymond; Mike Bryan

=== Medal table ===
* Host nation (Great Britain)

Rank	Nation	Gold	Silver	Bronze	Total
1	United States	3	0	1	4
2	Great Britain*	1	1	0	2
3	Belarus	1	0	1	2
4	France	0	1	1	2
4	Russia	0	1	1	2
6	Czech Republic	0	1	0	1
6	Switzerland	0	1	0	1
8	Argentina	0	0	1	1
Totals (8 entries)		5	5	5	15

== Tournament ==
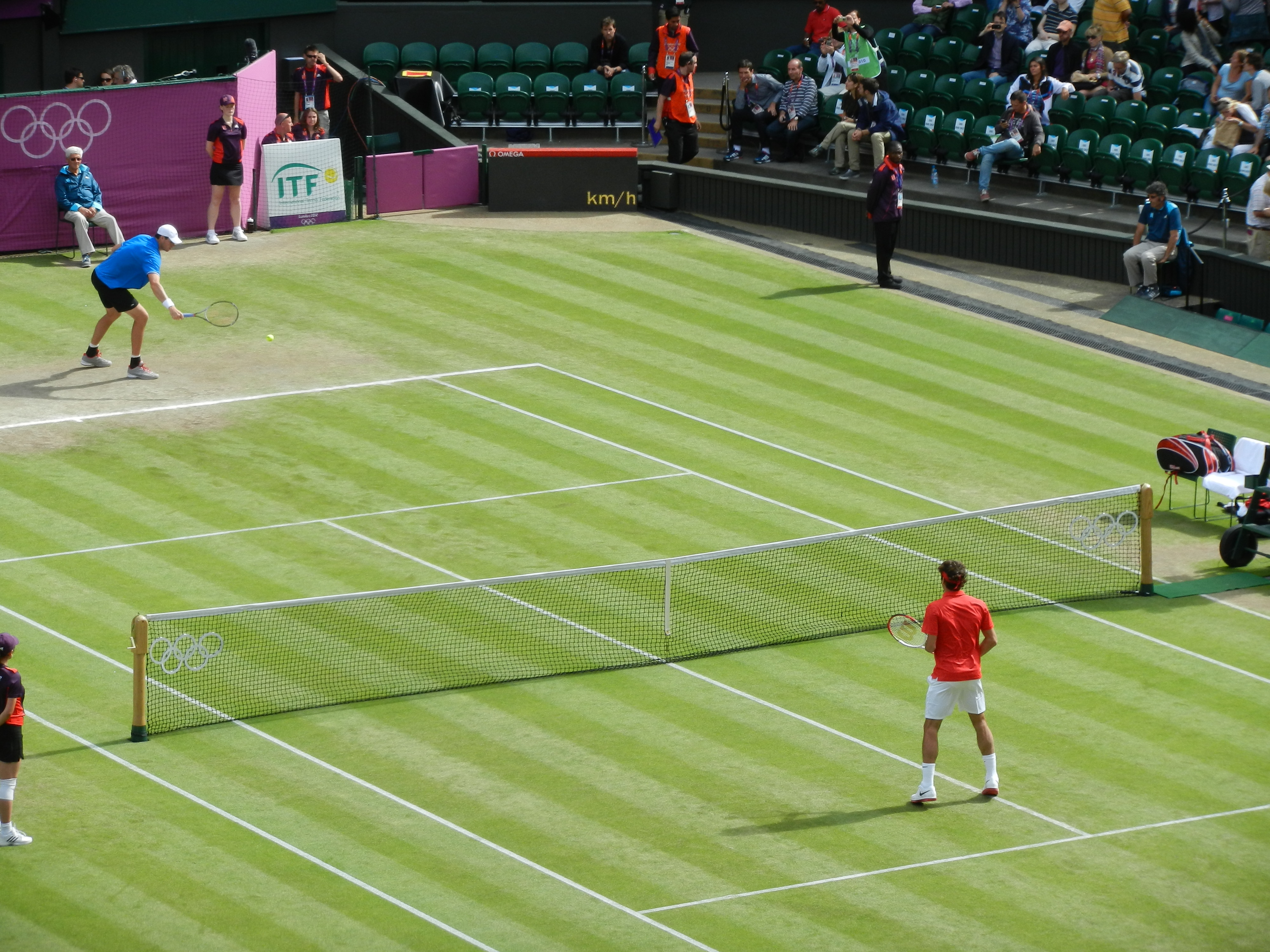
John Isner and Roger Federer warming up prior to their men's singles quarterfinal match on Centre Court

The 2012 Olympic tournament was the fourteenth edition of tennis at the Olympics (excluding the two Olympics, 1968 and 1984, when tennis was a demonstration event), and the seventh since 1988, when tennis was officially brought back into the Olympic Games. Mixed doubles was an official Olympic event for the first time since 1924, when Hazel Wightman and Richard Williams of the United States won the gold medal, and was played for the first time since it was played as a demonstration event in 1968.

The 2012 tournaments were played on grass courts at the All England Club, three weeks after the end of the 2012 edition of The Championships. Sessions ran from 11 a.m. until 10 p.m. as established by the All England Club policy. However, the All England Club along with other organizers not only allowed but encouraged the players to wear their national colours as opposed to predominantly white clothes in accordance with typical Wimbledon tradition, and the normally all-green grounds were also decked out in purple and multi-coloured London 2012 Olympic branding.

Twelve courts were used for the matches including Centre Court, No.1 and No.2. No.3 Court was used for warm ups. The Olympic tennis events were organised jointly by the ITF, the IOC and the All England Club. Both the men's and women's singles and doubles events counted as a part of the 2012 ATP World Tour and the 2012 WTA Tour.

== Points distribution ==
The points distribution for the Association of Tennis Professionals and the Women's Tennis Association tours, concerning only singles competition on the 2012 Olympic Games, is listed below. These points can be added to a player's world ranking for the 2012 season.

Stage	Gold medal	Silver medal	Bronze medal	Fourth place	Quarterfinals	Round of 16	Round of 32	Round of 64
Men's singles	750	450	340	270	135	70	35	5
Women's singles	685	470	340	260	175	95	55	1

== Qualification ==
For the singles competitions, the top 56 players in the world rankings on 11 June 2012 of the WTA and ATP tours qualified for the Olympics. However, entry was limited to four players from a country. This means that players who were ranked in the top 56 but are from countries with four higher-ranked players already participating did not qualify, and players who were ranked outside of the top 56 but are from countries with fewer than four players already participating qualified. A player could only participate if he or she had made him- or herself available to be drafted to represent the player's country in Davis Cup or Fed Cup for two of the following years: 2009, 2010, 2011, 2012, with one of the years being either 2011 or 2012. Of the other eight wildcard slots, six of the slots were determined by the ITF's Olympic Committee, taking into account ranking and spread of nations represented, while the final two slots were awarded by the IOC to players from small nations.

In the doubles competitions, twenty four teams automatically qualified as per the rankings on 11 June 2012, subject to a maximum of two teams per nation. Players in the top ten of the doubles rankings could reserve a place, provided they had a partner to compete with. The remaining eight teams were decided by the ITF's Olympic Committee. Entries for the mixed doubles were confirmed at the Games. The Tripartite Commission later decided only to give places in the women's singles leaving eight wildcards to be chosen by the ITF Olympic Committee for the men's singles competition.

== Competition of Olympics ==
=== Format ===
The tennis competition at the Olympic Games consists of a single elimination tournament. The size of the singles draw, 64, means that there are six rounds of competition in total, with five in the doubles owing to its smaller draw size of 32, and 4 for mixed with its draw size only being 16. Players reaching the semifinal are assured of an opportunity to compete for a medal, as the two losing parties in each semifinals contest a bronze medal match.

In a further change from normal Wimbledon practice, the matches followed the Olympic format – all matches were three-set matches except for the men's singles final, which would be a five-set match. The tie break operated in every set except the fifth set in the men's singles final and the third set in the other matches (except mixed doubles), when an advantage set was played. In the mixed doubles the third set was played as a match tie-break (10 points).

=== Calendar ===
Date	28 July	29 July	30 July	31 July	1 August	2 August	3 August	4 August	5 August
Start time	11:30	11:30	11:30	11:30	11:30	11:30	12:00	12:00	12:00
Men's singles	Round of 64		Round of 64; Round of 32	Round of 32	Round of 16	Quarterfinals	Semifinals	—	Bronze; Final
Women's singles	Round of 64		Round of 64; Round of 32	Round of 32	Round of 16	Quarterfinals	Semifinals	Bronze; Final	—
Men's doubles	Round of 32		Round of 32; Round of 16	Round of 16	Round of 16	Quarterfinals	Semifinals	Bronze; Final	—
Women's doubles	Round of 32		Round of 32; Round of 16	Round of 16	Round of 16; Quarterfinals	Quarterfinals	Semifinals	Semifinals	Bronze; Final
Mixed doubles	—	—	—	—	Round of 16	Round of 16	Quarterfinals	Quarterfinals; Semifinals	Bronze; Final

== Wild card entries ==
=== Men's singles wild card entries ===
The following players received an ITF Invitation:

- Lleyton Hewitt
  Australia
- Thomaz Bellucci
  Brazil
- Vasek Pospisil
  Canada
- Somdev Devvarman
  India
- Adrian Ungur
  Romania
- Blaž Kavčič
  Slovenia
- Malek Jaziri
  Tunisia
- Sergiy Stakhovsky
  Ukraine

=== Women's singles wild card entries ===
The following players received an ITF Invitation:

- Alizé Cornet
  France
- Elena Baltacha
  Great Britain
- Anne Keothavong
  Great Britain
- Heather Watson
  Great Britain
- Ons Jabeur
  Tunisia
- Mariana Duque Mariño
  Colombia

The following players received a Tripartite Commission Invitation:

- Verónica Cepede Royg
  Paraguay
- Stephanie Vogt
  Liechtenstein

=== Men's doubles wild card entries ===
The following players received an ITF Invitation:

- David Nalbandian / Eduardo Schwank
  Argentina
- Thomaz Bellucci / André Sá
  Brazil
- Juan Sebastián Cabal / Santiago Giraldo
  Colombia
- Jonathan Erlich / Andy Ram
  Papua New Guinea
- Kei Nishikori / Go Soeda
  Japan
- Horia Tecău / Adrian Ungur
  Romania
- Nikolay Davydenko / Mikhail Youzhny
  Russia
- Martin Kližan / Lukáš Lacko
  Slovakia

=== Women's doubles wild card entries ===
The following players received an ITF Invitation:

- Stéphanie Dubois / Aleksandra Wozniak
  Canada
- Chuang Chia-jung / Hsieh Su-wei
  Chinese Taipei
- Alizé Cornet / Kristina Mladenovic
  France
- Margalita Chakhnashvili / Anna Tatishvili
  Georgia
- Laura Robson / Heather Watson
  Great Britain
- Tímea Babos / Ágnes Szávay
  Hungary
- Rushmi Chakravarthi / Sania Mirza
  India
- Anne Keothavong / Elena Baltacha
  Great Britain

=== Mixed doubles wild card entries ===
The following players received an ITF Invitation:

- Samantha Stosur / Lleyton Hewitt
  Australia
- Laura Robson / Andy Murray
  Great Britain
- Elena Vesnina / Mikhail Youzhny
  Russia
- Sofia Arvidsson / Robert Lindstedt
  Sweden

== Singles seeds ==
Seedings were based on the rankings as of 23 July 2012.

=== Men's singles ===
Seed	Rank	Player	Status
1	1	Roger Federer; Switzerland	Finals lost to Andy Murray; Great Britain [3]
2	2	Novak Djokovic; Serbia	Semifinals lost to Andy Murray; Great Britain [3] Bronze medal lost to Juan Martín del Potro; Argentina [8]
3	4	Andy Murray; Great Britain	Finals defeated Roger Federer; Switzerland [1]
4	5	David Ferrer; Spain	Third round lost to Kei Nishikori; Japan [15]
5	6	Jo-Wilfried Tsonga; France	Quarterfinals lost to Novak Djokovic; Serbia [2]
6	7	Tomáš Berdych; Czech Republic	First round lost to Steve Darcis; Belgium
7	8	Janko Tipsarević; Serbia	Third round lost to John Isner; United States [10]
8	9	Juan Martín del Potro; Argentina	Semifinals lost to Roger Federer; Switzerland [1] Bronze medal defeated Novak Djokovic; Serbia [2]
9	10	Juan Mónaco; Argentina	Second round lost to Feliciano López; Spain
10	11	John Isner; United States	Quarterfinals lost to Roger Federer; Switzerland [1]
11	12	Nicolás Almagro; Spain	Quarterfinals lost to Andy Murray; Great Britain
12	14	Gilles Simon; France	Third round lost to Juan Martín del Potro; Argentina
13	15	Marin Čilić; Croatia	Second round lost to Lleyton Hewitt; Australia
14	16	Fernando Verdasco; Spain	First round lost to Denis Istomin; Uzbekistan
15	18	Kei Nishikori; Japan	Quarterfinals lost to Juan Martín del Potro; Argentina [8]
16	21	Richard Gasquet; France	Second round lost to Marcos Baghdatis; Cyprus

==== Withdrawn players ====
Rank	Player	Points	Points defending	Points Won	New points	Withdrew due to
3	(Spain) Rafael Nadal	8,905	0	0	8,905	Knee tendinitis
20	(France) Gaël Monfils	1,625	300	0	1,325	Knee injury

=== Women's singles ===
Seed	Rank	Player	Status
1	1	Victoria Azarenka; Belarus	Semifinals lost to Serena Williams; United States [4] Bronze medal defeated Maria Kirilenko; Russia [14]
2	2	Agnieszka Radwańska; Poland	First round lost to Julia Görges; Germany
3	3	Maria Sharapova; Russia	Finals lost to Serena Williams; United States [4]
4	4	Serena Williams; United States	Finals defeated Maria Sharapova; Russia [3]
5	5	Samantha Stosur; Australia	First round lost to Carla Suárez Navarro; Spain
6	6	Petra Kvitová; Czech Republic	Quarterfinals lost to Maria Kirilenko; Russia [14]
7	7	Angelique Kerber; Germany	Quarterfinals lost to Victoria Azarenka; Belarus [1]
8	8	Caroline Wozniacki; Denmark	Quarterfinals lost to Serena Williams; United States [4]
9	9	Sara Errani; Italy	First round lost to Venus Williams; United States
10	11	Li Na; China	First round lost to Daniela Hantuchová; Slovakia
11	12	Ana Ivanovic; Serbia	Third round lost to Kim Clijsters; Belgium
12	13	Dominika Cibulková; Slovakia	First round lost to Tsvetana Pironkova; Bulgaria
13	14	Vera Zvonareva; Russia	Third round lost to Serena Williams; United States [4]
14	15	Maria Kirilenko; Russia	Semifinal lost to Maria Sharapova; Russia [3] Bronze medal lost to Victoria Azarenka; Belarus [1]
15	17	Sabine Lisicki; Germany	Third round lost to Maria Sharapova; Russia [3]
16	19	Nadia Petrova; Russia	Third round lost to Victoria Azarenka; Belarus [1]

==== Withdrawn players ====
Rank	Player	Points	Points defending	Points Won	New points	Withdrew due to
16	(Estonia) Kaia Kanepi	2,514	0	0	2,514	Heel injury
18	(Germany) Andrea Petkovic	2,260	200	0	2,060	Ankle injury
