= Slovakia at the 2012 Summer Olympics =

- IOC code: SVK
- NOC: Slovak Olympic and Sports Committee
- Website: www.olympic.sk (in Slovak)

in London
- Competitors: 47 in 11 sports
- Flag bearers: Jozef Gönci (opening); Danka Barteková (closing)
- Medals Ranked 59th: Gold 0 Silver 1 Bronze 3 Total 4

Summer Olympics appearances (overview)
- 1996; 2000; 2004; 2008; 2012; 2016; 2020; 2024; 2028

Other related appearances
- Hungary (1896–1912); Czechoslovakia (1924–1992)

Slovakia competed in the 2012 Summer Olympics in London, from 27 July to 12 August 2012. This was the nation's fifth consecutive appearance at the Summer Olympics. The Slovak Olympic Committee sent a total of 47 athletes to the Games, 26 men and 21 women, to compete in 11 sports. There was only a single competitor in badminton, judo, triathlon, and weightlifting.

The Slovak team featured three defending Olympic champions from Beijing: slalom canoers Michal Martikán, and twins Pavol and Peter Hochschorner. Rifle shooter and double bronze medalist Jozef Gönci, who was the nation's flag bearer at the opening ceremony, competed at his sixth Olympics and was the oldest and most experienced athlete, at age 38. Meanwhile, medley swimmer Katarína Listopadová was the youngest member of the team, at age 19. Other notable Slovak athletes included road cyclist and world junior champion Peter Sagan, weightlifter and three-time Olympic veteran Martin Tešovič, and professional tennis player Daniela Hantuchová.

Slovakia left London with a total of four medals (one silver and three bronze), failing to win a gold for the first time in Olympic history and in the post-Czechoslovak era. Among the nation's medalists were shooters Zuzana Štefečeková and Danka Barteková, who took silver and bronze medals in the women's trap and skeet events respectively. On 11 August 2012, Barteková was elected to the IOC Athletes Commission, along with three other athletes. Meanwhile, Michal Martikán, who won bronze in London, became the most successful Slovak athlete in history with a total of five Olympic medals.

== Medalists ==
Medal	Name	Sport	Event	Date
Silver	Zuzana Štefečeková	Shooting	Women's trap	4 August
Bronze	Danka Barteková	Shooting	Women's skeet	29 July
Bronze	Michal Martikán	Canoeing	Men's slalom C-1	31 July
Bronze	Peter Hochschorner; Pavol Hochschorner	Canoeing	Men's slalom C-2	2 August

Medals by sport
Sport	1st place, gold medalist(s)	2nd place, silver medalist(s)	3rd place, bronze medalist(s)	Total
Shooting	0	1	1	2
Canoeing	0	0	2	2
Total	0	1	3	4

== Competitors ==
The following is the list of number of competitors participating in the Games:

Sport	Men	Women	Total
Athletics	5	6	11
Badminton	0	1	1
Canoeing	9	3	12
Cycling	1	1	2
Gymnastics	1	1	2
Judo	1	0	1
Shooting	4	3	7
Swimming	1	4	5
Tennis	2	2	4
Triathlon	1	0	1
Weightlifting	1	0	1
Total	26	21	47

Medals by date
Day	Date	1st place, gold medalist(s)	2nd place, silver medalist(s)	3rd place, bronze medalist(s)	Total
Day 1	28 July	0	0	0	0
Day 2	29 July	0	0	1	1
Day 3	30 July	0	0	0	0
Day 4	31 July	0	0	1	1
Day 5	1 August	0	0	0	0
Day 6	2 August	0	0	1	1
Day 7	3 August	0	0	0	0
Day 8	4 August	0	1	0	1
Day 9	5 August	0	0	0	0
Day 10	6 August	0	0	0	0
Day 11	7 August	0	0	0	0
Day 12	8 August	0	0	0	0
Day 13	9 August	0	0	0	0
Day 14	10 August	0	0	0	0
Day 15	11 August	0	0	0	0
Day 16	12 August	0	0	0	0
Total		0	1	3	4

== Athletics ==
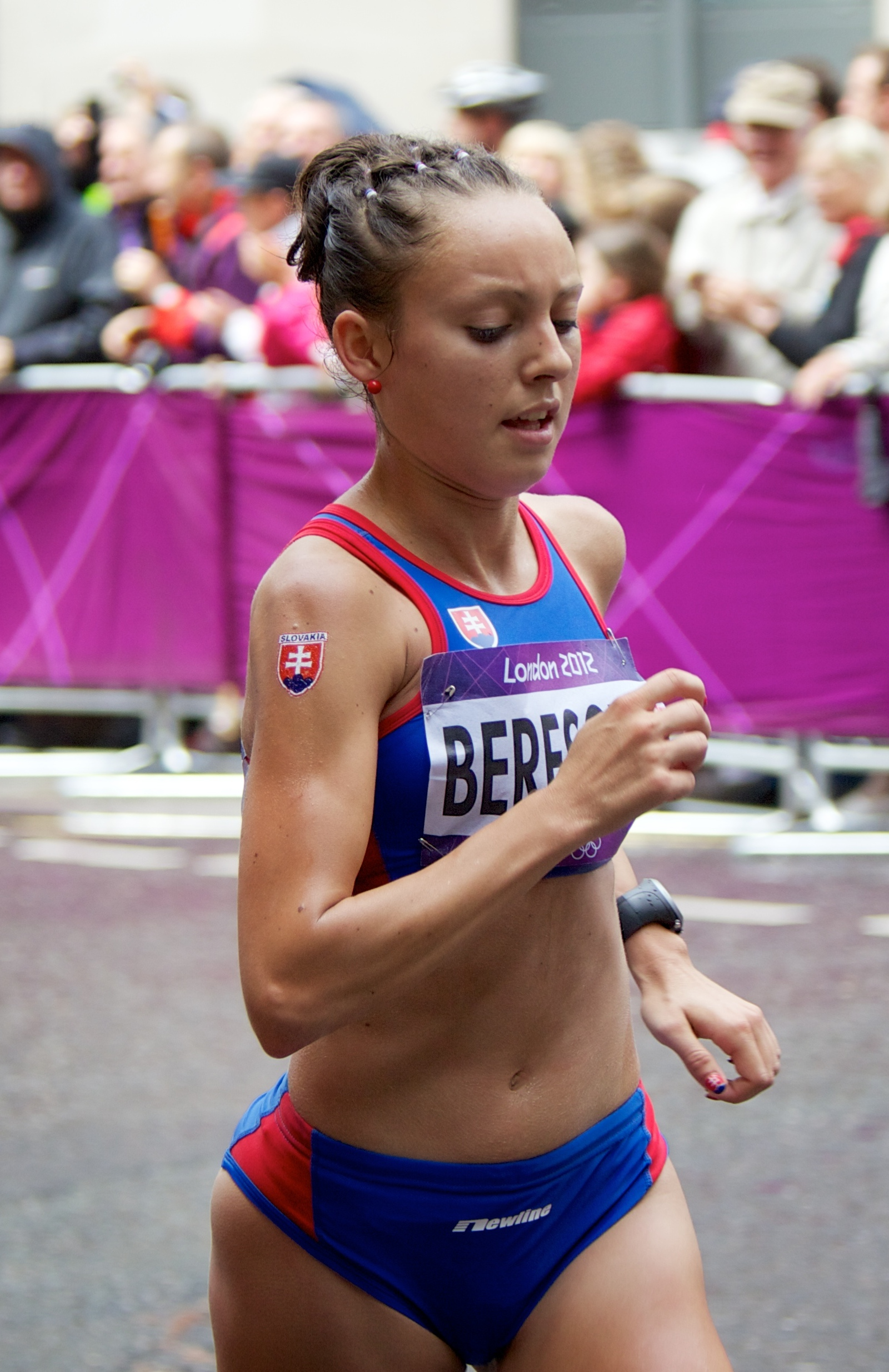
Katarína Berešová, during the marathon.

Slovak athletes have so far achieved qualifying standards in the following athletics events (up to a maximum of 3 athletes in each event at the 'A' Standard, and 1 at the 'B' Standard):

Key

- Note–Ranks given for track events are within the athlete's heat only
- Q = Qualified for the next round
- q = Qualified for the next round as a fastest loser or, in field events, by position without achieving the qualifying target
- NR = National record
- N/A = Round not applicable for the event
- Bye = Athlete not required to compete in round

Men
Track & road events

Athlete	Event	Final	
Athlete	Event	Result	Rank
Miloš Bátovský	50 km walk	4:09:32	48
Anton Kučmín	20 km walk	1:22:25	23
Matej Tóth	50 km walk	3:41:24	5

Field events

Athlete	Event	Qualification		Final	
Athlete	Event	Distance	Position	Distance	Position
Michal Kabelka	High jump	2.16	30	Did not advance	
Marcel Lomnický	Hammer throw	74.00	15	Did not advance	

Women
Track & road events

Athlete	Event	Heat		Semifinal		Final	
Athlete	Event	Result	Rank	Result	Rank	Result	Rank
Katarína Berešová	Marathon	—N/a				2:48:11	99
Mária Czaková	20 km walk	—N/a				1:37:43	53
Lucia Klocová	1500 m	4:07.79 NR	9 q	4:02.99 NR	8 q	4:12.64	4

Field events

Athlete	Event	Qualification		Final	
Athlete	Event	Distance	Position	Distance	Position
Martina Hrašnová	Hammer throw	68.41	20	Did not advance	
Dana Velďáková	Triple jump	14.22	10 q	11.92	12
Jana Velďáková	Long jump	6.18	27	Did not advance	

== Badminton ==
Athlete	Event	Group Stage			Elimination	Quarterfinal	Semifinal	Final / BM	
Athlete	Event	Opposition Score	Opposition Score	Rank	Opposition Score	Opposition Score	Opposition Score	Opposition Score	Rank
Monika Fašungová	Women's singles	Gu (SIN); L 5–21, 11–21	Na (AUS); L 12–21, 18–21	3	Did not advance				

== Canoeing ==
=== Slalom ===
Slovakia has qualified boats for the following events

Athlete	Event	Preliminary						Semifinal		Final	
Athlete	Event	Run 1	Rank	Run 2	Rank	Best	Rank	Time	Rank	Time	Rank
Michal Martikán	Men's C-1	139.46	16	90.56	1	90.56	1 Q	104.04	4 Q	98.31	3rd place, bronze medalist(s)
Pavol Hochschorner; Peter Hochschorner	Men's C-2	97.52	2	98.60	1	97.52	2 Q	109.04	2 Q	108.28	3rd place, bronze medalist(s)
Jana Dukátová	Women's K-1	105.14	5	101.37	4	101.37	6 Q	110.48	4 Q	111.60	6

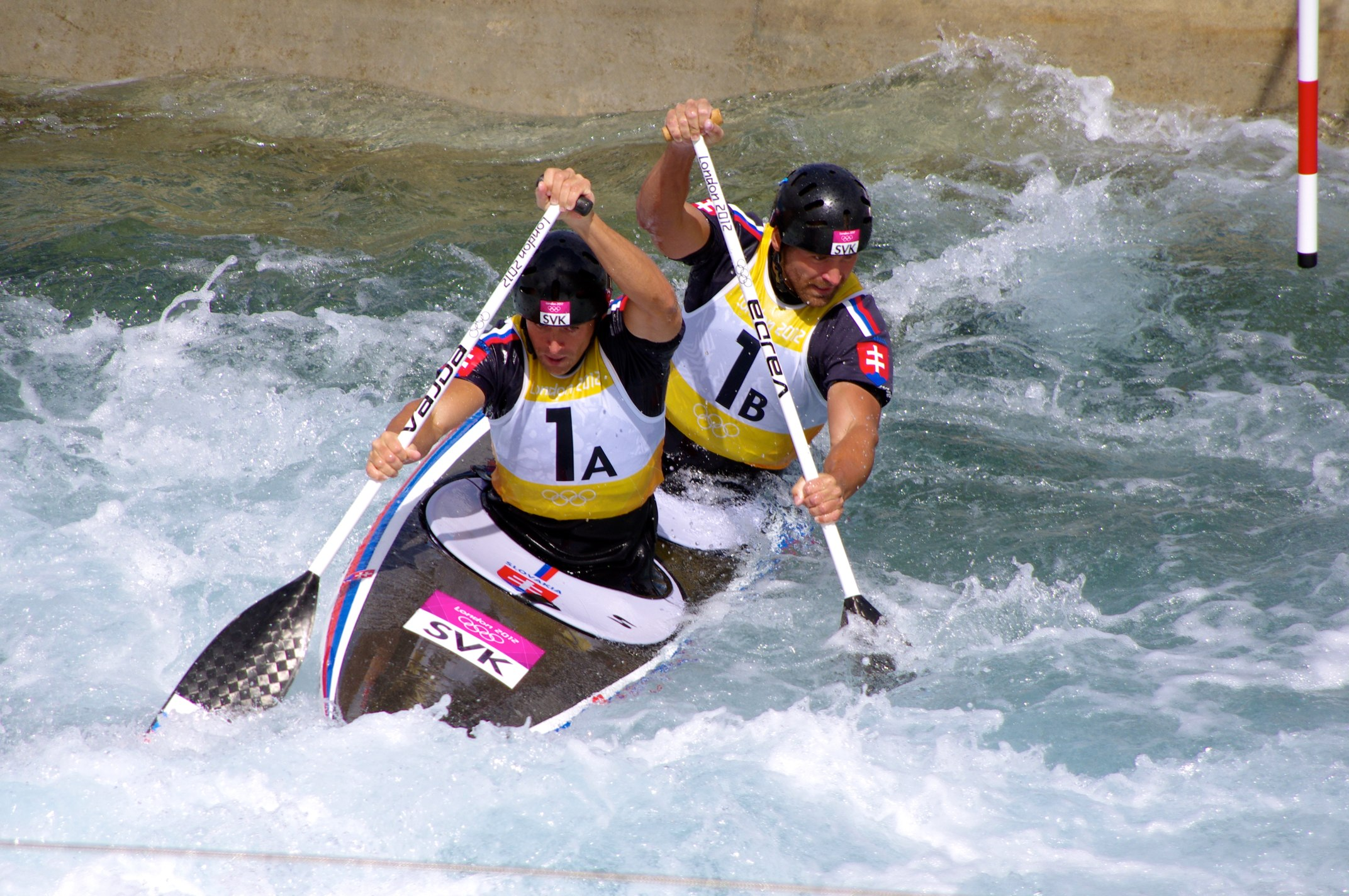
Pavol & Peter Hochschorner in Men's C-2 semifinal

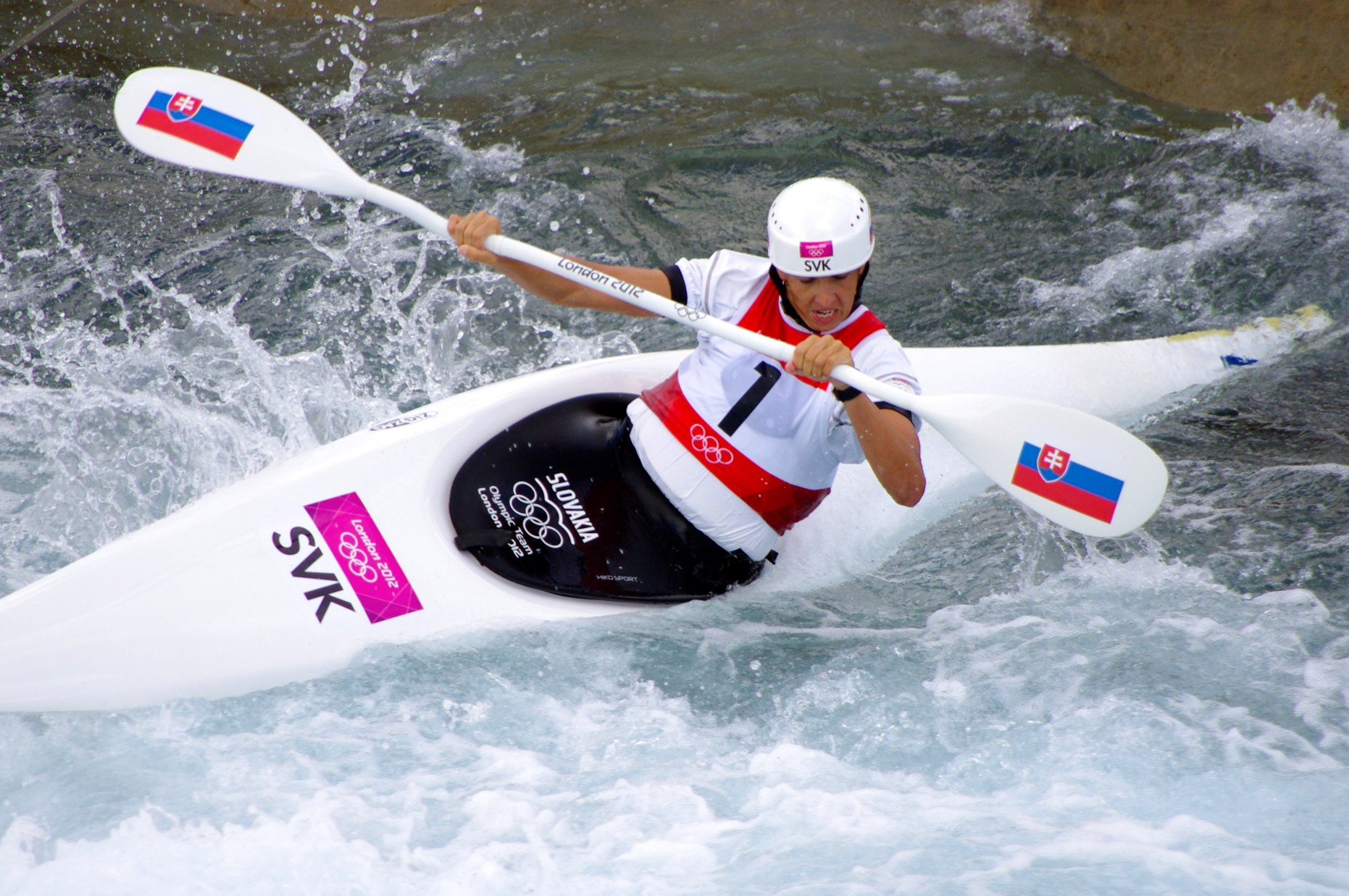
Jana Dukátová in Women's K-1 semifinal

=== Sprint ===
Slovakia has qualified boats for the following events

Men

Athlete	Event	Heats		Semifinals		Final	
Athlete	Event	Time	Rank	Time	Rank	Time	Rank
Ľubomír Hagara	C-1 200 m	43.507	5 Q	41.472	3 FA	43.977	6
Marek Krajčovič	K-1 1000 m	3:39.649	7	Did not advance			
Peter Gelle; Erik Vlček	K-2 1000 m	3:19.571	3 Q	3:12.690	1 FA	3:12.519	8
Peter Gelle; Martin Jankovec; Juraj Tarr; Erik Vlček	K-4 1000 m	2:55.173	1 FA	Bye		2:56.771	6

Women

Athlete	Event	Heats		Semifinals		Final	
Athlete	Event	Time	Rank	Time	Rank	Time	Rank
Ivana Kmeťová	K-1 200 m	43.445	6 Q	42.510	5 FB	45.556	14
Ivana Kmeťová; Martina Kohlová	K-2 500 m	1:45.073	5 Q	1:43.653	5 FB	1:47.683	13

Qualification Legend: FA = Qualify to final (medal); FB = Qualify to final B (non-medal)

== Cycling ==
Slovakia has qualified in the following events

=== Road ===
Athlete	Event	Time	Rank
Peter Sagan	Men's road race	5:46:37	34

=== Mountain biking ===
Athlete	Event	Time	Rank
Janka Števková	Women's cross-country	1:39:05	21

== Gymnastics ==
=== Artistic ===
Men

Athlete	Event	Qualification								Final							
Athlete	Event	Apparatus						Total	Rank	Apparatus						Total	Rank
Athlete	Event	F	PH	R	V	PB	HB	Total	Rank	F	PH	R	V	PB	HB	Total	Rank
Samuel Piasecký	Parallel bars	—N/a				15.358	—N/a	15.358	11	Did not advance							
Samuel Piasecký	Horizontal bar	—N/a					12.666	12.666	65	Did not advance							

Women

Athlete	Event	Qualification						Final					
Athlete	Event	Apparatus				Total	Rank	Apparatus				Total	Rank
Athlete	Event	F	V	UB	BB	Total	Rank	F	V	UB	BB	Total	Rank
Mária Homolová	All-around	12.066	12.766	10.458	11.733	47.023	57	Did not advance					

== Judo ==
Slovakia has qualified 1 judoka

Athlete	Event	Round of 32	Round of 16	Quarterfinals	Semifinals	Repechage	Final / BM	
Athlete	Event	Opposition Result	Opposition Result	Opposition Result	Opposition Result	Opposition Result	Opposition Result	Rank
Milan Randl	Men's −90 kg	Iliadis (GRE); L 0002–0111	Did not advance					

== Shooting ==
Slovakia has earned seven qualification berths in shooting events:

Men

Athlete	Event	Qualification		Final	
Athlete	Event	Points	Rank	Points	Rank
Jozef Gönci	50 m rifle 3 positions	1157	31	Did not advance	
Jozef Gönci	50 m rifle prone	589	39	Did not advance	
Jozef Gönci	10 m air rifle	591	31	Did not advance	
Pavol Kopp	50 m pistol	556	20	Did not advance	
Pavol Kopp	10 m air pistol	576	21	Did not advance	
Juraj Tužinský	50 m pistol	554	23	Did not advance	
Juraj Tužinský	10 m air pistol	580	15	Did not advance	
Erik Varga	Trap	121	12	Did not advance	

Women

Athlete	Event	Qualification		Final	
Athlete	Event	Points	Rank	Points	Rank
Danka Barteková	Skeet	70	2 Q	90	3rd place, bronze medalist(s)
Daniela Pešková	50 m rifle 3 positions	576	34	Did not advance	
Daniela Pešková	10 m air rifle	395	14	Did not advance	
Zuzana Štefečeková	Trap	73	2 Q	93 S/O 3	2nd place, silver medalist(s)

== Swimming ==
Slovak swimmers have so far achieved qualifying standards in the following events (up to a maximum of 2 swimmers in each event at the Olympic Qualifying Time (OQT), and 1 at the Olympic Selection Time (OST)):

Men

Athlete	Event	Heat		Semifinal		Final	
Athlete	Event	Time	Rank	Time	Rank	Time	Rank
Tomáš Klobučník	200 m breaststroke	2:13.40	23	Did not advance			

Women

Athlete	Event	Heat		Semifinal		Final	
Athlete	Event	Time	Rank	Time	Rank	Time	Rank
Katarína Filová	100 m freestyle	56.58	31	Did not advance			
Katarína Filová	200 m freestyle	2:02.03	28	Did not advance			
Katarína Listopadová	200 m individual medley	2:16.81	28	Did not advance			
Denisa Smolenová	100 m butterfly	59.48	28	Did not advance			
Denisa Smolenová	200 m butterfly	2:11.10	21	Did not advance			
Miroslava Syllabová	50 m freestyle	26.07	38	Did not advance			

== Tennis ==
Men

Athlete	Event	Round of 64	Round of 32	Round of 16	Quarterfinals	Semifinals	Final / BM	
Athlete	Event	Opposition Score	Opposition Score	Opposition Score	Opposition Score	Opposition Score	Opposition Score	Rank
Martin Kližan	Singles	Roddick (USA); L 5–7, 4–6	Did not advance					
Lukáš Lacko	Singles	Petzschner (GER); L 6–7^{(5–7)}, 1–6	Did not advance					
Martin Kližan; Lukáš Lacko	Doubles	—N/a	Tipsarević / Zimonjić (SRB); L 3–6, 3–6	Did not advance				

Women

Athlete	Event	Round of 64	Round of 32	Round of 16	Quarterfinals	Semifinals	Final / BM	
Athlete	Event	Opposition Score	Opposition Score	Opposition Score	Opposition Score	Opposition Score	Opposition Score	Rank
Dominika Cibulková	Singles	Pironkova (BUL); L 6–7^{(4–7)}, 2–6	Did not advance					
Daniela Hantuchová	Singles	Li N (CHN); W 6–2, 3–6, 6–3	Cornet (FRA); W 6–3, 6–0	Wozniacki (DEN); L 4–6, 2–6	Did not advance			
Dominika Cibulková; Daniela Hantuchová	Doubles	—N/a	A. Radwańska / U. Radwańska (POL); L 2–6, 1–6	Did not advance				

== Triathlon ==
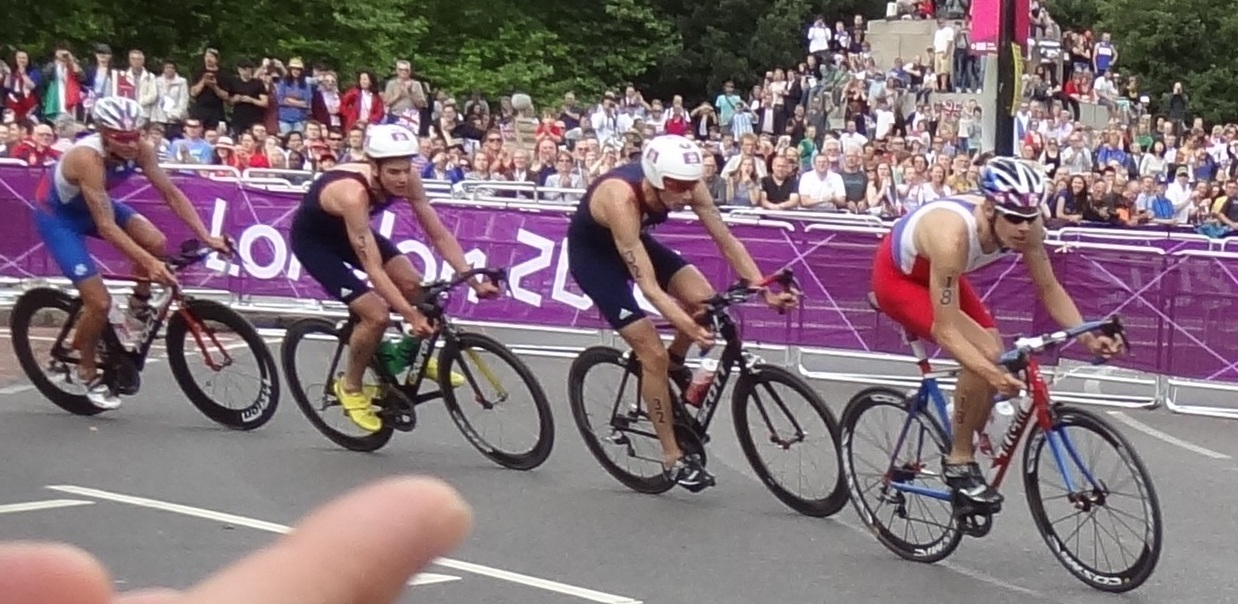
Richard Varga, in red, during the triathlon.

Slovakia has qualified the following athletes.

Athlete	Event	Swim (1.5 km)	Trans 1	Bike (40 km)	Trans 2	Run (10 km)	Total Time	Rank
Richard Varga	Men's	16:56	0:41	59:15	0:30	32:03	1:49:25	22

== Weightlifting ==
Slovakia has qualified the following quota places.

Athlete	Event	Snatch		Clean & Jerk		Total	Rank
Athlete	Event	Result	Rank	Result	Rank	Total	Rank
Martin Tešovič	Men's −105 kg	167	12	196	12	363	11
