= 2011 World Taekwondo Olympic Qualification Tournament – Women's 49 kg =

Taekwondo competition

World Qualification Tournament
Men	Women
58 kg	49 kg
68 kg	57 kg
80 kg	67 kg
+80 kg	+67 kg

The Women's 49 is a competition featured at the 2011 World Taekwondo Olympic Qualification Tournament, and was held at the Sarhadchi Olympic Center in Baku, Azerbaijan on July 2. The first three ranked athletes qualify their NOCs a place each at the 2012 Olympic Games.

== Results ==
Legend

- DQ — Won by disqualification
- WD — Won by withdrawal

=== Finals ===
Semifinals
Wu Jingyu (CHN)	15
Yang Shu-chun (TPE)	7
Yajaira Peguero (DOM)	1
Lucija Zaninović (CRO)	14

Final
Wu Jingyu (CHN)	WD
Lucija Zaninović (CRO)
3rd place
Yang Shu-chun (TPE)	8
Yajaira Peguero (DOM)	0

=== Top half ===
==== Section 1 ====
Round of 64
Aischal van der Linde (ARU)	DQ
~~Liliana Mircică (ROU)~~
Shraddha Dixit (IND)	0
Ivett Gonda (CAN)	10
~~Elaine Teo (MAS)~~
Andrea Erazo (HON)	DQ

Round of 32
Wu Jingyu (CHN)	11
Aischal van der Linde (ARU)	0
Julissa Diez Canseco (PER)	DQ
~~Hind Mokhtari (ALG)~~
Svetlana Igumenova (RUS)	2
Ivett Gonda (CAN)	4
Andrea Erazo (HON)	3
Erika Kasahara (JPN)	9

Round of 16
Wu Jingyu (CHN)	9
Julissa Diez Canseco (PER)	6
Ivett Gonda (CAN)	4
Erika Kasahara (JPN)	7

Quarterfinals
Wu Jingyu (CHN)	10
Erika Kasahara (JPN)	2

==== Section 2 ====
Round of 64
Gita Cherkezia (GEO)	0
Carola López (ARG)	6
Nour Abdelsalam (EGY)	8
Cynthia Kragbe (CIV)	0
~~Mildred Alango (KEN)~~
Nila Ahmadi (AFG)	DQ
Raya Hatahet (JOR)	8
Fransisca Valentina (INA)	7

Round of 32
Jannet Alegría (MEX)	7
Carola López (ARG)	6
Nour Abdelsalam (EGY)	0
Carolena Carstens (PAN)	1
Jyra Lizardo (PHI)	9
Nila Ahmadi (AFG)	2
Raya Hatahet (JOR)	0
Yang Shu-chun (TPE)	6

Round of 16
Jannet Alegría (MEX)	17
Carolena Carstens (PAN)	7
Jyra Lizardo (PHI)	0
Yang Shu-chun (TPE)	12

Quarterfinals
Jannet Alegría (MEX)	4
Yang Shu-chun (TPE)	8

=== Bottom half ===
==== Section 3 ====
Round of 64
Anna Mirkin (ISR)	8
Elizabeth Zamora (GUA)	11
Iliyana Eneva (BUL)	DQ
~~Rosa Keleku (COD)~~
Kiran Bano (PAK)	2
Yajaira Peguero (DOM)	14
Stavroulla Iosifaki (CYP)	2
Aminata Traoré (MLI)	6

Round of 32
Brigitte Yagüe (ESP)	4
Elizabeth Zamora (GUA)	5
Iliyana Eneva (BUL)	4
Krisztina Sikesdi (HUN)	5
Sümeyye Manz (GER)	5
Yajaira Peguero (DOM)	7
Aminata Traoré (MLI)	3
Chanatip Sonkham (THA)	6

Round of 16
Elizabeth Zamora (GUA)	6
Krisztina Sikesdi (HUN)	1
Yajaira Peguero (DOM)	6
Chanatip Sonkham (THA)	4

Quarterfinals
Elizabeth Zamora (GUA)	1
Yajaira Peguero (DOM)	4

==== Section 4 ====
Round of 64
Jennifer Hurley (IRL)	4
Galina Khan (UZB)	8
Ganna Soroka (UKR)	7
Manivanh Khounviseth (LAO)	2
~~Anneleen Goffin (BEL)~~
Federica Mastrantoni (ITA)	DQ

Round of 32
Lucija Zaninović (CRO)	10
Galina Khan (UZB)	7
Ganna Soroka (UKR)	8
Katia Arakaki (BRA)	1
~~Haya Jumaa (UAE)~~
Natascha Mitrovits (AUT)	DQ
Federica Mastrantoni (ITA)	6
Sanaa Atabrour (MAR)	10

Round of 16
Lucija Zaninović (CRO)	14
Ganna Soroka (UKR)	1
Natascha Mitrovits (AUT)	6
Sanaa Atabrour (MAR)	7

Quarterfinals
Lucija Zaninović (CRO)	15
Sanaa Atabrour (MAR)	3
