= 2011 World Taekwondo Championships – Women's flyweight =

Taekwondo competition

Women's flyweight at the 2011 World Championships
- Venue: Gyeongju Indoor Stadium
- Dates: 1–2 May 2011
- Competitors: 54 from 54 nations

Medalists
gold medal	Wu Jingyu	China
silver medal	Yang Shu-chun	Chinese Taipei
bronze medal	Brigitte Yagüe	Spain
bronze medal	Sanaa Atabrour	Morocco

The Women's flyweight is a competition featured at the 2011 World Taekwondo Championships, and was held at the Gyeongju Gymnasium in Gyeongju, South Korea on May 1 and May 2. Flyweights were limited to a maximum of 49 kilograms in body mass.

== Results ==
Legend

- DQ — Won by disqualification
- W — Won by withdrawal

=== Finals ===
Semifinals		Final
Wu Jingyu (CHN)	5
Brigitte Yagüe (ESP)	4	Wu Jingyu (CHN)	6
Yang Shu-chun (TPE)	10	Yang Shu-chun (TPE)	2
Sanaa Atabrour (MAR)	1

=== Top half ===
==== Section 1 ====
Round of 64
Tserengiin Otgonchuluun (MGL)	0
Aischal van der Linde (ARU)	7
Hanna Zajc (SWE)	3
Federica Mastrantoni (ITA)	0
Galina Khan (UZB)	10
Akniyet Sadykova (KAZ)	4
Deireanne Morales (USA)	6
Charlotte Bjelke (DEN)	1
Kaltham Al-Mutawah (QAT)	DQ
~~Shadia Ngonja (KEN)~~

Round of 32
Wu Jingyu (CHN)	8
Aischal van der Linde (ARU)	0
Hanna Zajc (SWE)	0
Galina Khan (UZB)	1
Lucija Zaninović (CRO)	4
Deireanne Morales (USA)	0
Kaltham Al-Mutawah (QAT)	0
Erika Kasahara (JPN)	8^{W}

Round of 16
Wu Jingyu (CHN)	8
Galina Khan (UZB)	1
Lucija Zaninović (CRO)	4
Erika Kasahara (JPN)	1

Quarterfinals
Wu Jingyu (CHN)	10
Lucija Zaninović (CRO)	1

==== Section 2 ====
Round of 64
Hind Mokhtari (ALG)	0
Turkana Tahirli (AZE)	1
~~Mónica Olarte (COL)~~
Yajaira Peguero (DOM)	DQ
Chynea Lang (AUS)	2
Fernanda Silva (BRA)	7
Julissa Diez Canseco (PER)	3
Ebru Askar (GER)	1
Ganna Soroka (UKR)	10
Elizabeth Zamora (GUA)	1
Fransisca Valentina (INA)	DQ
~~Maria Cueva (ECU)~~

Round of 32
Jannet Alegría (MEX)	7
Turkana Tahirli (AZE)	1
Yajaira Peguero (DOM)	4
Fernanda Silva (BRA)	5
Julissa Diez Canseco (PER)	1
Ganna Soroka (UKR)	3
Fransisca Valentina (INA)	1
Brigitte Yagüe (ESP)	4

Round of 16
Jannet Alegría (MEX)	5
Fernanda Silva (BRA)	7
Ganna Soroka (UKR)	4
Brigitte Yagüe (ESP)	5

Quarterfinals
Fernanda Silva (BRA)	0
Brigitte Yagüe (ESP)	3

=== Bottom half ===
==== Section 3 ====
Round of 64
Aminata Traoré (MLI)	4
Đoàn Thị Hương Giang (VIE)	1
Ioanna Koutsou (GRE)	7
May Sandar Kyaw Win (MYA)	1
Annie-Pier Turcotte (CAN)	1
Kim Hye-jeong (KOR)	4
Radwa Reda (EGY)	4
Yeny Contreras (CHI)	0
Dana Haidar (JOR)	1
Kadriye Selimoğlu (TUR)	0
Purva Dixit (IND)	6
Shum Pui Shan (HKG)	0

Round of 32
Yasmina Aziez (FRA)	3
Aminata Traoré (MLI)	0
Ioanna Koutsou (GRE)	0
Kim Hye-jeong (KOR)	7
Radwa Reda (EGY)	5
Dana Haidar (JOR)	7
Purva Dixit (IND)	0
Yang Shu-chun (TPE)	12^{W}

Round of 16
Yasmina Aziez (FRA)	3
Kim Hye-jeong (KOR)	6
Dana Haidar (JOR)	0
Yang Shu-chun (TPE)	1

Quarterfinals
Kim Hye-jeong (KOR)	4
Yang Shu-chun (TPE)	7

==== Section 4 ====
Round of 64
Victoria Stambaugh (PUR)	1
Jyra Lizardo (PHI)	6
Zhazgul Dzhumalieva (KGZ)	DQ
~~Miladys Mariño (VEN)~~
Kristina Korobko (TJK)	DQ
~~Andrea Erazo (HON)~~
~~Rosa Keleku (COD)~~
Iliyana Eneva (BUL)	DQ
~~Daynellis Montejo (CUB)~~
Katsiaryna Mishchuk (BLR)	DQ

Round of 32
Chanatip Sonkham (THA)	17
Jyra Lizardo (PHI)	4
Zhazgul Dzhumalieva (KGZ)	0
Kristina Kim (RUS)	12
Kristina Korobko (TJK)	4
Iliyana Eneva (BUL)	8
Katsiaryna Mishchuk (BLR)	1
Sanaa Atabrour (MAR)	4

Round of 16
Chanatip Sonkham (THA)	1
Kristina Kim (RUS)	2
Iliyana Eneva (BUL)	0
Sanaa Atabrour (MAR)	5

Quarterfinals
Kristina Kim (RUS)	1
Sanaa Atabrour (MAR)	4
