= 2009 World Taekwondo Championships – Women's flyweight =

Taekwondo competition

Women's flyweight at the 2009 World Championships
- Venue: Ballerup Super Arena
- Dates: 15 October 2009
- Competitors: 56 from 56 nations

Medalists
gold medal	Brigitte Yagüe	Spain
silver medal	Anna Soboleva	Russia
bronze medal	Zoraida Santiago	China
bronze medal	Yasmina Aziez	France

The Women's flyweight is a competition featured at the 2011 World Taekwondo Championships, and was held at the Ballerup Super Arena in Copenhagen, Denmark on October 15. Flyweights were limited to a maximum of 49 kilograms in body mass.

== Results ==
Legend

- DQ — Won by disqualification

=== Finals ===
Semifinals		Final
Wu Jingyu (CHN)	1
Brigitte Yagüe (ESP)	6	Brigitte Yagüe (ESP)	2
Anna Soboleva (RUS)	3	Anna Soboleva (RUS)	0
Yasmina Aziez (FRA)	2

=== Top half ===
==== Section 1 ====
Round of 64
Aygul Abdullayeva (AZE)	5
Soe Soe Myar (MYA)	8
Đoàn Thị Hương Giang (VIE)	0
Ganna Soroka (UKR)	3
Barbara Ducz (HUN)	3
Shafiqa Kargar (AFG)	2
Aminata Traoré (MLI)	6
Brigitte Crockford (CAN)	2
Almira Yesmyrzayeva (KAZ)	2
Raya Hatahet (JOR)	8
Louise Mair (GBR)	5
Julissa Diez Canseco (PER)	5

Round of 32
Wu Jingyu (CHN)	11
Soe Soe Myar (MYA)	2
Ganna Soroka (UKR)	3
Barbara Ducz (HUN)	0
Aminata Traoré (MLI)	3
Raya Hatahet (JOR)	3
Louise Mair (GBR)	8
Sara Khoshjamal Fekri (IRI)	11

Round of 16
Wu Jingyu (CHN)	2
Ganna Soroka (UKR)	0
Aminata Traoré (MLI)	3
Sara Khoshjamal Fekri (IRI)	8

Quarterfinals
Wu Jingyu (CHN)	6
Sara Khoshjamal Fekri (IRI)	5

==== Section 2 ====
Round of 64
Jessica Rovira (AND)	0
Laura López (ARG)	4
Maryam Ismaili (BEL)	1
Brigitte Yagüe (ESP)	7
Foteini Birmpa (GRE)	0
Mariama Diallo (SEN)	0
Chanatip Sonkham (THA)	5
Natascha Mitrovits (AUT)	0
Sinead Smyth (AUS)	6
Yajaira Peguero (DOM)	5
Lanetar Quek (SIN)	0
Liao Wei-chun (TPE)	12

Round of 32
Daynellis Montejo (CUB)	2
Laura López (ARG)	3
Brigitte Yagüe (ESP)	11
Mariama Diallo (SEN)	0
Chanatip Sonkham (THA)	7
Sinead Smyth (AUS)	6
Liao Wei-chun (TPE)	7
Manuela Bezzola (SUI)	4

Round of 16
Laura López (ARG)	1
Brigitte Yagüe (ESP)	4
Chanatip Sonkham (THA)	7
Liao Wei-chun (TPE)	1

Quarterfinals
Brigitte Yagüe (ESP)	4
Chanatip Sonkham (THA)	1

=== Bottom half ===
==== Section 3 ====
Round of 64
Choi Yoo-jin (KOR)	1
Erika Kasahara (JPN)	2
Maddalena Tortorella (ITA)	DQ
~~Jennifer Hurley (IRL)~~
Sevde Mavi (TUR)	1
Fernanda Silva (BRA)	0
Cynthia Kragbe (CIV)	2
Tatjana Gorbunova (LTU)	3
Dagmar López (PUR)	4
Victoria Stambaugh (USA)	4
Nildem Kayas (GER)	2
Sandra Ildez (HON)	1

Round of 32
Caroline Yousry (EGY)	0
Erika Kasahara (JPN)	4
Maddalena Tortorella (ITA)	1
Sevde Mavi (TUR)	3
Tatjana Gorbunova (LTU)	3
Dagmar López (PUR)	2
Nildem Kayas (GER)	0
Anna Soboleva (RUS)	3

Round of 16
Erika Kasahara (JPN)	3
Sevde Mavi (TUR)	4
Tatjana Gorbunova (LTU)	3
Anna Soboleva (RUS)	11

Quarterfinals
Sevde Mavi (TUR)	3
Anna Soboleva (RUS)	4

==== Section 4 ====
Round of 64
Alejandra Mena (CHI)	3
Jyra Lizardo (PHI)	9
Linda Kilumba (COD)	1
Mónica Olarte (COL)	10
Elaine Teo (MAS)	2
Jannet Alegría (MEX)	3
Sandra Christensen (DEN)	1
Johana Fernández (VEN)	4
Fanny Bygdén (SWE)	DQ
~~Elizabeth Ngugi (KEN)~~
Laila Nguyen (NOR)	DQ
~~Elyse Chakar (LIB)~~

Round of 32
Yasmina Aziez (FRA)	9
Jyra Lizardo (PHI)	5
Mónica Olarte (COL)	1
Jannet Alegría (MEX)	7
Johana Fernández (VEN)	1
Fanny Bygdén (SWE)	3
Laila Nguyen (NOR)	1
Sanaa Atabrour (MAR)	17

Round of 16
Yasmina Aziez (FRA)	3
Jannet Alegría (MEX)	3
Fanny Bygdén (SWE)	0
Sanaa Atabrour (MAR)	4

Quarterfinals
Yasmina Aziez (FRA)	7
Sanaa Atabrour (MAR)	5
