= Taekwondo at the 2011 Pan American Games – Women's 49 kg =

Taekwondo – Women's 49 kg at the 2011 Pan American Games
- Venue: CODE II Gymnasium
- Dates: October 15
- Competitors: 14 from 14 nations

Medalists
Gold medal	Ivett Gonda	Canada
Silver medal	Lizbeth Diez-Canseco	Peru
Bronze medal	Jannet Alegria	Mexico
Bronze medal	Deireanne Morales	United States

The women's 49 kg competition of the taekwondo events at the 2011 Pan American Games took place on the 15 of October at the CODE II Gymnasium. The defending Pan American Games champion is Alejandra Gaal of Mexico, while the defending Pan American Championship, champion is Jannet Alegria also of Mexico.

== Schedule ==
All times are Central Standard Time (UTC-6).

Date	Time	Round
October 15, 2011	11:00	Preliminaries
October 15, 2011	12:30	Quarterfinals
October 15, 2011	17:00	Semifinals
October 15, 2011	18:00	Final

== Results ==
Legend

- PTG — Won by Points Gap
- SUP — Won by Superiority
- OT — Won on over time (Golden Point)

=== Main bracket ===
Preliminary round
Johanys Tejada (PUR)	9
Andrea Franco (BOL)	1
Andrea Erazo (HON)	2
Monica Olarte (COL)	5
Fiama Salazar (ECU)	7
Lizbeth Diez-Canseco (PER)	14
Katia Arakaki (BRA)	7
Yajaira Peguero (DOM)	6
Deireanne Morales (USA)	6
Elizabeth Zamora (GUA)	5
Daynellis Montejo (CUB)
Ivett Gonda (CAN)	SUP

Quarterfinals
Jannet Alegria (MEX)	12
Johanys Tejada (PUR)	6
Monica Olarte (COL)	6
Lizbeth Diez-Canseco (PER)	11
Katia Arakaki (BRA)	3
Deireanne Morales (USA)	10
Ivett Gonda (CAN)	11
Carolena Carstens (PAN)	4

Semifinals
Jannet Alegria (MEX)	14
Lizbeth Diez-Canseco (PER)	15 (OT)
Deireanne Morales (USA)	3
Ivett Gonda (CAN)	8

Gold medal match
Lizbeth Diez-Canseco (PER)	6
Ivett Gonda (CAN)	13
