= Taekwondo at the 2012 Summer Olympics – Women's 49 kg =

Taekwondo competition

Women's 49kg at the Games of the XXX Olympiad
- Venue: ExCeL London
- Date: 8 August
- Competitors: 16 from 16 nations

Medalists
1st place, gold medalist(s)		Wu Jingyu	China
2nd place, silver medalist(s)		Brigitte Yagüe	Spain
3rd place, bronze medalist(s)		Chanatip Sonkham	Thailand
3rd place, bronze medalist(s)		Lucija Zaninović	Croatia

The women's 49 kg competition at the 2012 Summer Olympics was held on 8 August, at the ExCeL London.

== Competition format ==
The main bracket consisted of a single elimination tournament, culminating in the gold medal match. Two bronze medals were awarded at the Taekwondo competitions. A repechage was used to determine the bronze medal winners. Every competitor who lost to one of the two finalists competed in the repechage, another single-elimination competition. Each semifinal loser faced the last remaining repechage competitor from the opposite half of the bracket in a bronze medal match.

== Schedule ==
All times are British Summer Time (UTC+1)

Date	Time	Round
Wednesday, 8 August 2012	09:00; 15:00; 17:00; 22:15	Preliminary Round; Quarterfinals; Semifinals; Final

== Results ==
On 13 July 2012, the World Taekwondo Federation released the provisional draw which included the top eight seeds for the competition. The remainder of the qualified athletes were randomly drawn on 6 August 2012.

=== Main Bracket ===
Legend

- PTG — Won by Points Gap

Preliminary round
1	Wu Jingyu (CHN)	10
Elizabeth Zamora (GUA)	2
Theresa Tona (PNG)	0
8	Erika Kasahara (JPN)	12 (PTG)
5	Lucija Zaninović (CRO)	14 (PTG)
Seulki Kang (CAF)	0
Carola Malvina López (ARG)	1
4	Sanaa Atabrour (MAR)	0
3	Brigitte Yagüe (ESP)	7
Carolena Carstens (PAN)	2
Raya Hatahet (JOR)	1
6	Jannet Alegría (MEX)	12
7	Chanatip Sonkham (THA)	13 (PTG)
Kristina Kim (RUS)	1
Sumeyye Manz (GER)	3
2	Yang Shu-chun (TPE)	10

Quarterfinals
1	Wu Jingyu (CHN)	14 (PTG)
8	Erika Kasahara (JPN)	0
5	Lucija Zaninović (CRO)	13
Carola Malvina López (ARG)	4
3	Brigitte Yagüe (ESP)	8
6	Jannet Alegría (MEX)	0
7	Chanatip Sonkham (THA)	6
2	Yang Shu-chun (TPE)	0

Semifinals
1	Wu Jingyu (CHN)	19 (PTG)
5	Lucija Zaninović (CRO)	7
3	Brigitte Yagüe (ESP)	10
7	Chanatip Sonkham (THA)	9

Gold medal match
1	Wu Jingyu (CHN)	8
3	Brigitte Yagüe (ESP)	1

=== Repechage ===
Round 1
Erika Kasahara (JPN)	2
Elizabeth Zamora (GUA)	6
Carolena Carstens (PAN)	2
Jannet Alegría (MEX)	7

Bronze medal match
Elizabeth Zamora (GUA)	0
Chanatip Sonkham (THA)	8
Lucija Zaninović (CRO)	6 (SUD)
Jannet Alegría (MEX)	5
