= Croatia at the 2012 Summer Olympics =

- IOC code: CRO
- NOC: Croatian Olympic Committee
- Website: www.hoo.hr (in Croatian and English)

in London
- Competitors: 108 in 17 sports
- Flag bearers: Venio Losert (opening); Damir Martin (closing)
- Medals Ranked 25th: Gold 3 Silver 1 Bronze 2 Total 6

Summer Olympics appearances (overview)
- 1992; 1996; 2000; 2004; 2008; 2012; 2016; 2020; 2024; 2028

Other related appearances
- Austria (1900); Yugoslavia (1920–1988)

Croatia competed at the 2012 Summer Olympics in London, United Kingdom, from 27 July to 12 August 2012. This was the nation's sixth consecutive appearance at the Summer Olympics.

The Croatian Olympic Committee (Croatian: Hrvatski olimpijski odbor, HOO) sent the nation's largest delegation to the Games. A total of 108 athletes, 64 men and 44 women, competed in 17 sports. Women's basketball, men's water polo, and handball were the only team-based sports in which Croatia had its representation in these Olympic Games. Among the sports played by athletes, Croatia also marked its Olympic debut in judo and fencing.

Croatian athletes featured two sets of twins (taekwondo jins Lucija and Ana Zaninović, and Greco-Roman wrestlers Neven and Nenad Žugaj). Table tennis player and Olympic silver medalist Zoran Primorac became the first Croatian athlete to participate in seven Olympic Games as an individual athlete (his first appearance competed under the former Socialist Federal Republic of Yugoslavia), and was also the oldest athlete of the team, at age 43. Venio Losert, captain of the men's handball team, was appointed by the committee to carry the nation's flag at the opening ceremony.

Croatia left London with a total of 6 Olympic medals (3 gold, 1 silver, and 2 bronze). This was the nation's most successful Olympics, based on the most medals won at a single games. All gold medals, being the highest in the nation's Olympic history, were awarded for the first time in women's discus throw, men's trap shooting, and men's water polo.

== Medalists ==
Medal	Name	Sport	Event	Date
Gold	Sandra Perković	Athletics	Women's discus	4 August
Gold	Giovanni Cernogoraz	Shooting	Men's trap	6 August
Gold	Croatia men's national water polo team: Samir Barač; Miho Bošković; Ivan Buljubašić; Damir Burić; Andro Bušlje; Nikša Dobud; Igor Hinić; Maro Joković; Petar Muslim; Paulo Obradović; Josip Pavić; Sandro Sukno; Frano Vićan	Water polo	Men's tournament	12 August
Silver	David Šain; Martin Sinković; Damir Martin; Valent Sinković	Rowing	Men's quadruple sculls	3 August
Bronze	Lucija Zaninović	Taekwondo	Women's 49 kg	8 August
Bronze	Croatia men's national handball team: Mirko Alilović; Ivano Balić; Damir Bičanić; Denis Buntić; Ivan Čupić; Domagoj Duvnjak; Jakov Gojun; Zlatko Horvat; Marko Kopljar; Blaženko Lacković; Venio Losert; Ivan Ninčević; Manuel Štrlek; Igor Vori; Drago Vuković	Handball	Men's tournament	12 August

== Athletics ==
Croatian athletes have achieved qualifying standards in the following athletics events (up to a maximum of 3 athletes in each event at the 'A' Standard, and 1 at the 'B' Standard): Former high jump world champion Blanka Vlašić did not compete in the London Olympics due to injury problems, although she was qualified for the Games.

Key

- Note – Ranks given for track events are within the athlete's heat only
- Q = Qualified for the next round
- q = Qualified for the next round as a fastest loser or, in field events, by position without achieving the qualifying target
- NR = National record
- N/A = Round not applicable for the event
- Bye = Athlete not required to compete in round

Men
Field events

Athlete	Event	Qualification		Final	
Athlete	Event	Distance	Position	Distance	Position
András Haklits	Hammer throw	70.61	30	Did not advance	
Ivan Horvat	Pole vault	5.35	20	Did not advance	
Martin Marić	Discus throw	62.87	17	Did not advance	
Nedžad Mulabegović	Shot put	19.86	18	Did not advance	
Roland Varga	Discus throw	58.17	36	Did not advance	

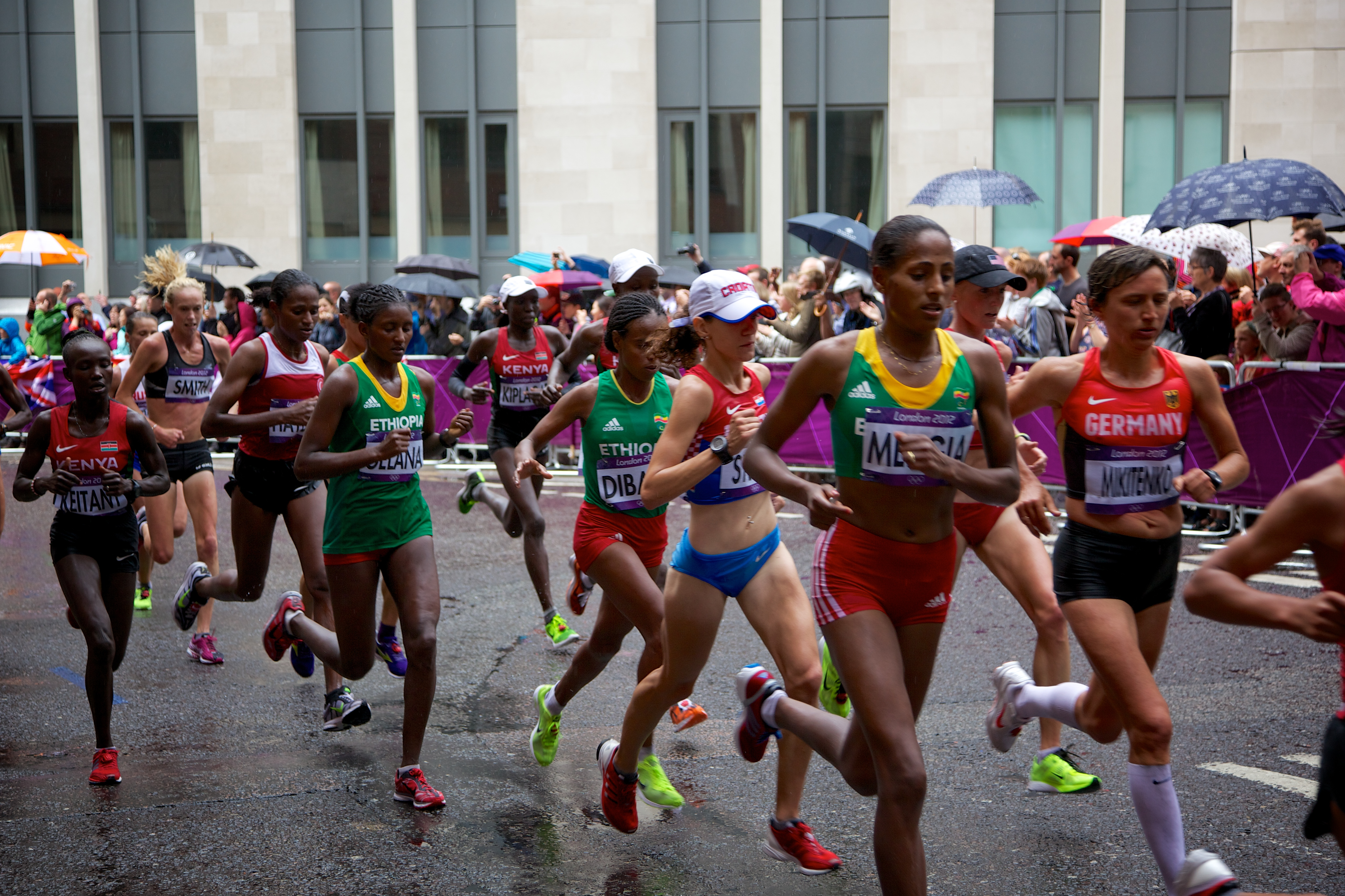
Lisa Stublić (center of the group, wearing a white cap) in the marathon race at the 2012 Olympics

Women
Track & road events

Athlete	Event	Heat		Semifinal		Final	
Athlete	Event	Result	Rank	Result	Rank	Result	Rank
Nikolina Horvat	400 m hurdles	58.49	8	Did not advance			
Lisa Stublić	Marathon	—N/a				2:34:03	52

Field events

Athlete	Event	Qualification		Final	
Athlete	Event	Distance	Position	Distance	Position
Sandra Perković	Discus throw	65.74	3 Q	69.11 NR	1st place, gold medalist(s)
Ana Šimić	High jump	1.80	29	Did not advance	

== Basketball ==
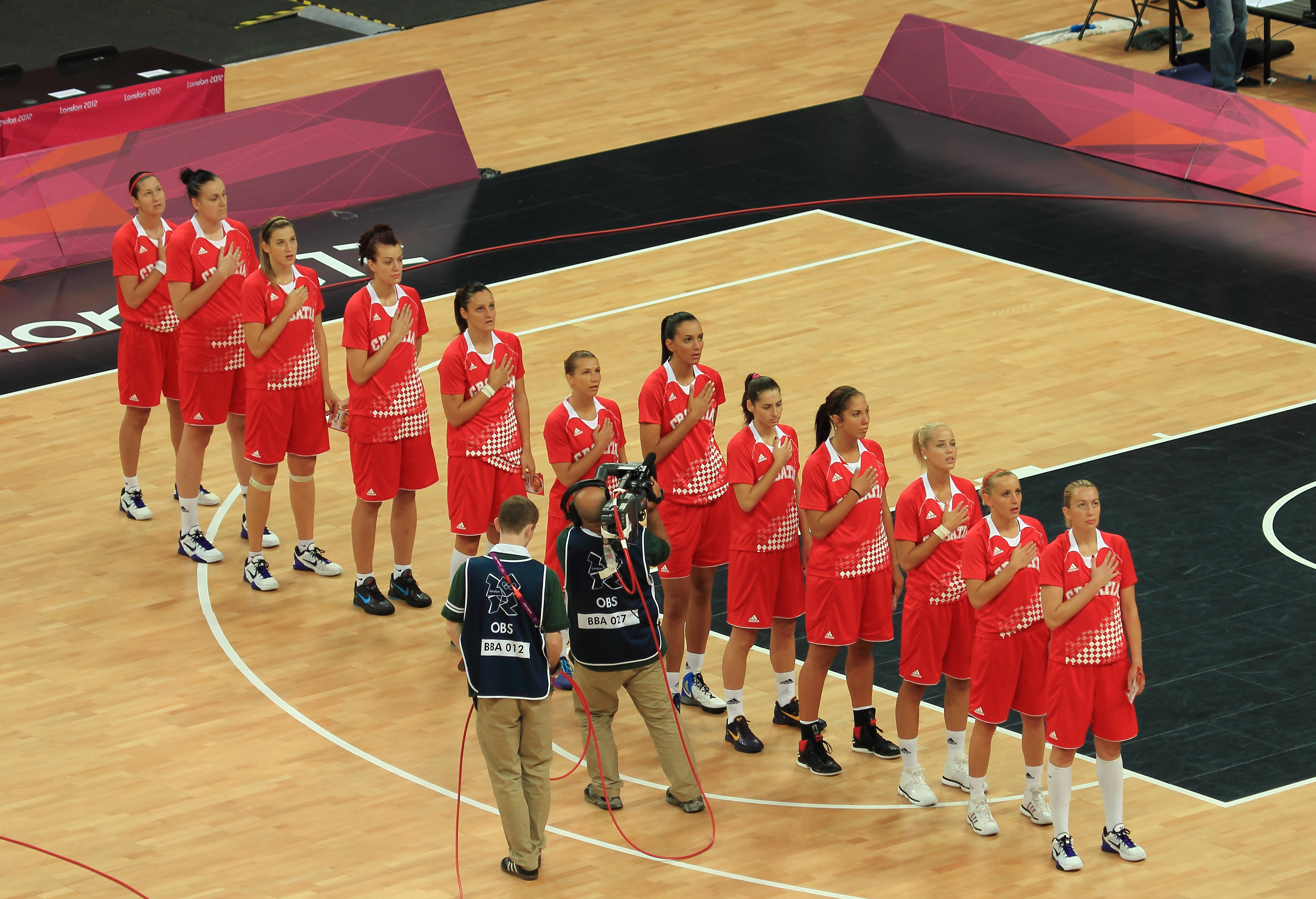
Croatia team singing national anthem prior to their match with Angola in the Group A preliminary rounds at the 2012 Summer Olympics in London. Right to left: Mandir, Jelavić, Mišura, Karčić, Salopek, Vrsaljko, Ciglar, Lelas, Slišković, Mazić, Ivanković, Ivezić.

Croatia has qualified a women's team.

- Women's team event – 1 team of 12 players

=== Women's tournament ===
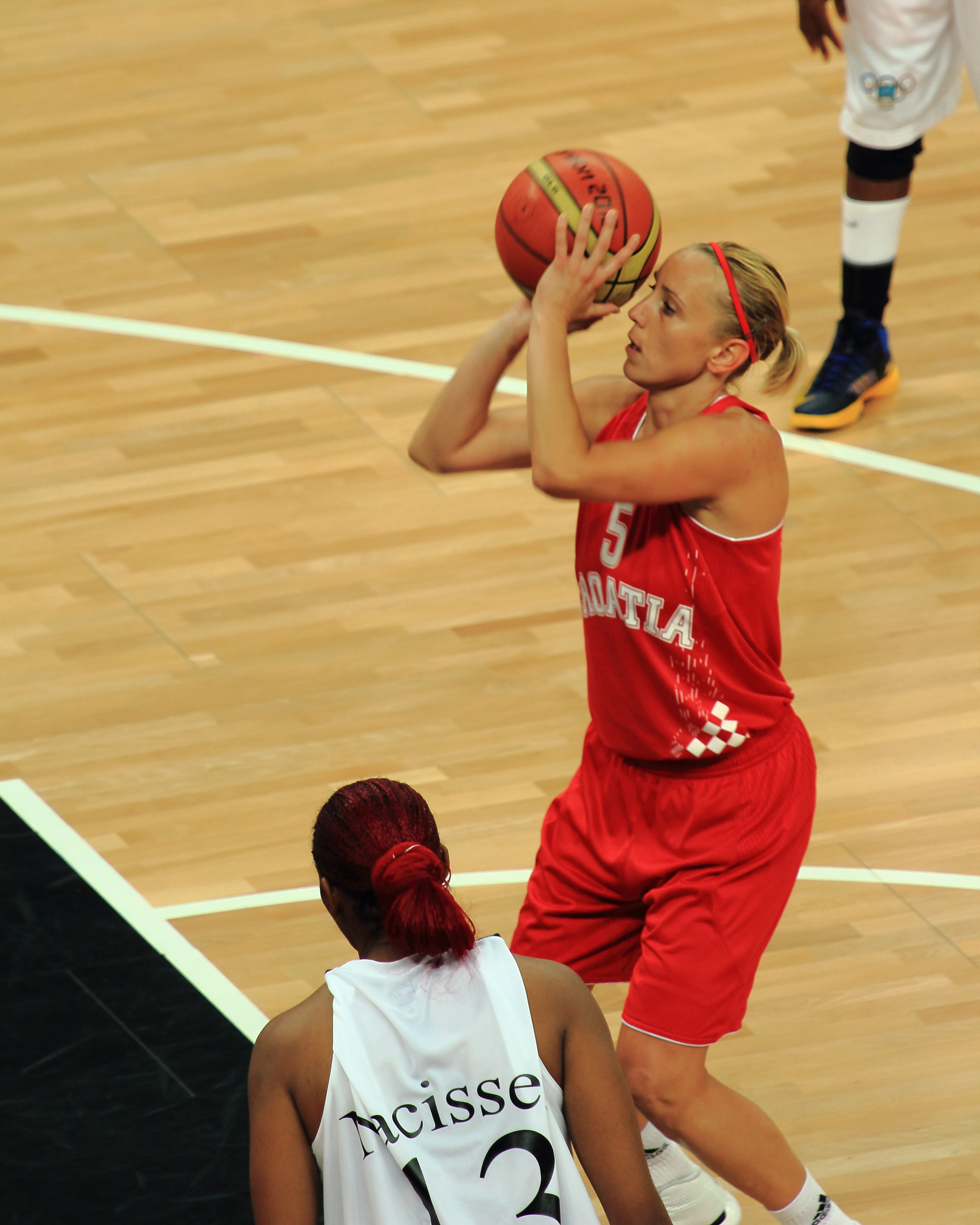
Anđa Jelavić at the 2012 London Olympics

Roster

The following is the Croatia roster in the women's basketball tournament of the 2012 Summer Olympics.

Croatia women's national basketball team – 2012 Summer Olympics roster
Players
Coaches

Pos.	No.	Name	Age – Date of birth	Height	Club	Ctr.
G	4	Sandra Mandir	34 – 4 August 1977	1.77 m (5 ft 10 in)	ŽKK Novi Zagreb	(Croatia)
G	5	Anđa Jelavić	31 – 21 September 1980	1.72 m (5 ft 8 in)	Kayseri Kaski S.K.	(Turkey)
F	6	Antonija Mišura	24 – 19 May 1988	1.79 m (5 ft 10 in)	ŽKK Jolly JBS	(Croatia)
F	7	Lisa Ann Karčić	25 – 11 November 1986	1.85 m (6 ft 1 in)	Caja Rural Tintos de Toro	(Spain)
G	8	Emanuela Salopek	25 – 18 April 1987	1.78 m (5 ft 10 in)	ŽKK Medveščak	(Croatia)
C	9	Marija Vrsaljko	22 – 8 August 1989	1.98 m (6 ft 6 in)	CB Avenida	(Spain)
G	10	Iva Ciglar	26 – 12 December 1985	1.67 m (5 ft 6 in)	Perpignan Basket	(France)
G/F	11	Ana Lelas	29 – 2 April 1983	1.83 m (6 ft 0 in)	Basket Lattes	(France)
F	12	Iva Slišković	27 – 4 September 1984	1.90 m (6 ft 3 in)	KK Kingtrade	(Croatia)
F	13	Mirna Mazić	26 – 24 December 1985	1.88 m (6 ft 2 in)	ŽKK Novi Zagreb	(Croatia)
C	14	Luca Ivanković	24 – 26 September 1987	1.98 m (6 ft 6 in)	ŽKK Jolly JBS	(Croatia)
G/F	15	Jelena Ivezić	28 – 17 March 1984	1.85 m (6 ft 1 in)	Ceyhan Belediyespor	(Turkey)

Head coach

- (Croatia) Stipe Bralić

Legend

- Club – describes last
  club before the tournament
- Age – describes age
  on 28 July 2012

Group play

Pos	Team	Pld	W	L	PF	PA	PD	Pts	Qualification
1	United States	5	5	0	462	279	+183	10	Quarterfinals
2	Turkey	5	4	1	343	316	+27	9	Quarterfinals
3	China	5	3	2	346	363	−17	8	Quarterfinals
4	Czech Republic	5	2	3	346	332	+14	7	Quarterfinals
5	Croatia	5	1	4	324	379	−55	6	
6	Angola	5	0	5	243	395	−152	5	

Source: FIBA archive
Rules for classification: 1) points; 2) head-to-head points; 3) head-to-head goal average; 4) head-to-head number of points scored.

28 July 2012
16:45

Report

United States	81–56	Croatia
Scoring by quarter: 11–4, 20–24, 22–19, 28–9
Pts: Charles 14; Rebs: Parker 13; Asts: Bird 5		Pts: Ivezić 22; Rebs: Ivanković 7 Asts: Lelas 5

Basketball Arena, London
Referees: Juan Arteaga (ESP), Oļegs Latiševs (LAT), Snehal Bendke (IND)

30 July 2012
09:00

Report

Croatia	58–83	China
Scoring by quarter: 21–24, 10–15, 14–25, 13–19
Pts: Mandir 22; Rebs: Ivezić 6 Asts: Jelavić, Lelas 4		Pts: Chen Nan 28; Rebs: Chen Nan 10; Asts: Miao Lijie 10

Basketball Arena, London
Referees: Michael Aylen (AUS), Elena Chernova (RUS), Felicia Grinter (USA)

1 August 2012
20:00

Report

Croatia	70–89	Czech Republic
Scoring by quarter: 19–22, 20–23, 21–12, 10–32
Pts: Mandir 20; Rebs: Mandir 6 Asts: Mandir 3		Pts: Elhotová 20; Rebs: Horáková 10; Asts: Veselá 7

Basketball Arena, London
Referees: Cristiano Maranho (BRA), Guerrino Cerebuch (ITA), Carole Delauné (FRA)

3 August 2012
09:00

Report

Angola	56–75	Croatia
Scoring by quarter: 18–24, 14–17, 11–18, 13–16
Pts: Tomas 15; Rebs: Mauricio, Tomas 8 Asts: Mauricio 4		Pts: Lelas 23; Rebs: Ivanković 7 Asts: Mandir 5

Basketball Arena, London
Referees: Stephen Seibel (CAN), Shoko Sugruro (JPN), Peng Ling (CHN)

5 August 2012
20:00

Report

Croatia	65–70	Turkey
Scoring by quarter: 24–18, 7–15, 13–25, 21–12
Pts: Lelas 14; Rebs: Lelas, Mandir 6 Asts: Lelas 5		Pts: Hollingsworth 14; Rebs: Yılmaz 9 Asts: Tunçluer, Vardarlı 5

Basketball Arena, London
Referees: Jorge Vázquez (PUR), Marcos Benito (BRA), Elena Chernova (RUS)

== Canoeing ==
=== Slalom ===
Athlete	Event	Preliminary						Semifinal		Final	
Athlete	Event	Run 1	Rank	Run 2	Rank	Total	Rank	Time	Rank	Time	Rank
Dinko Mulić	Men's K-1	293.58	22	143.28	20	143.28	22	Did not advance			

== Cycling ==
=== Road ===
Athlete	Event	Time	Rank
Kristijan Đurasek	Men's road race	5:46:37	68
Radoslav Rogina	Men's road race	5:46:37	41

- Robert Kišerlovski was initially selected for road race, but he had to withdraw after he got injured on the 14th stage of Tour de France. As a consequence, Kristijan Đurasek was selected as a replacement. Đurasek's participation was later confirmed by IOC.

== Fencing ==
Croatia has qualified 1 fencer.

Men

Athlete	Event	Round of 64	Round of 32	Round of 16	Quarterfinal	Semifinal	Final / BM	
Athlete	Event	Opposition Score	Opposition Score	Opposition Score	Opposition Score	Opposition Score	Opposition Score	Rank
Bojan Jovanović	Individual foil	Gomez (MEX); L 14–15	Did not advance					

== Gymnastics ==
=== Artistic ===
Men

Athlete	Event	Qualification								Final							
Athlete	Event	Apparatus						Total	Rank	Apparatus						Total	Rank
Athlete	Event	F	PH	R	V	PB	HB	Total	Rank	F	PH	R	V	PB	HB	Total	Rank
Filip Ude	Pommel horse	—N/a	13.933	—N/a				13.933	32	Did not advance							

Women

Athlete	Event	Qualification						Final					
Athlete	Event	Apparatus				Total	Rank	Apparatus				Total	Rank
Athlete	Event	F	V	UB	BB	Total	Rank	F	V	UB	BB	Total	Rank
Tina Erceg	All-around	13.466	13.500	12.833	12.266	52.065	40	Did not advance					

== Handball ==
Summary

Key:

- ET – After extra time
- P – Match decided by penalty-shootout.

Team	Event	Group Stage						Quarterfinal	Semifinal	Final / BM	
Team	Event	Opposition Score	Opposition Score	Opposition Score	Opposition Score	Opposition Score	Rank	Opposition Score	Opposition Score	Opposition Score	Rank
Croatia men's	Men's tournament	South Korea; W 31–21	Serbia; W 31–23	Hungary; W 26–19	Denmark; W 32–21	Spain; W 30–25	1	Tunisia; W 25–23	France; L 22–25	Hungary; W 33–26	3rd place, bronze medalist(s)
Croatia women's	Women's tournament	Brazil; L 23–24	Angola; W 28–23	Russia; W 30–28	Montenegro; W 27–26	Great Britain; W 37–14	2	Spain; L 22–25	Did not advance		7

=== Men's tournament ===
Roster

The following is the Croatia roster in the men's handball tournament of the 2012 Summer Olympics.

Head coaches: Slavko Goluža

No.	Pos.	Name	Date of birth (age)	Height	App.	Goals	Club
1	GK	Venio Losert	25 July 1976 (aged 36)	1.91 m			(Spain) CB Ademar León
4	CB	Ivano Balić	1 April 1979 (aged 33)	1.91 m			(Croatia) RK Zagreb
5	CB	Domagoj Duvnjak	1 June 1988 (aged 24)	1.97 m			(Germany) HSV Hamburg
6	LB	Blaženko Lacković	25 December 1980 (aged 31)	1.96 m			(Germany) HSV Hamburg
8	RB	Marko Kopljar	12 February 1986 (aged 26)	2.10 m			(Croatia) RK Zagreb
9	P	Igor Vori	20 September 1980 (aged 31)	2.03 m			(Germany) HSV Hamburg
10	LB	Jakov Gojun	18 April 1986 (aged 26)	2.04 m			(Croatia) RK Zagreb
13	RW	Zlatko Horvat	25 September 1984 (aged 27)	1.80 m			(Croatia) RK Zagreb
14	LB	Drago Vuković	3 August 1983 (aged 28)	1.94 m			(Germany) TuS N-Lübbecke
20	LB	Damir Bičanić	29 June 1985 (aged 27)	1.94 m			(France) Chambéry Handball
21	RB	Denis Buntić	13 October 1982 (aged 29)	1.99 m			(Poland) Vive Targi Kielce
25	GK	Mirko Alilović	15 September 1985 (aged 26)	2.00 m			(Hungary) MKB Veszprém
26	LW	Manuel Štrlek	1 December 1988 (aged 23)	1.84 m			(Croatia) RK Zagreb
27	RW	Ivan Čupić	27 March 1986 (aged 26)	1.79 m			(Germany) Rhein-Neckar Löwen
29	LW	Ivan Ninčević	27 October 1981 (aged 30)	1.84 m			(Germany) Füchse Berlin

Group play

Team	Pld	W	D	L	GF	GA	GD	Pts	Qualification
Croatia	5	5	0	0	150	109	+41	10	Quarter-finals
Denmark	5	4	0	1	124	129	−5	8	Quarter-finals
Spain	5	3	0	2	140	126	+14	6	Quarter-finals
Hungary	5	2	0	3	114	128	−14	4	Quarter-finals
Serbia	5	1	0	4	120	131	−11	2	
South Korea	5	0	0	5	115	140	−25	0	

29 July 2012; 11:15	Croatia	31 – 21	South Korea	Copper Box, London; Attendance: 4,068; Referees: Marina, Minore (ARG)
29 July 2012; 11:15	Čupić 8	(14–8)	Jeong Yi-kyeong 5	Copper Box, London; Attendance: 4,068; Referees: Marina, Minore (ARG)
29 July 2012; 11:15	1× (yellow card) 4× (suspension)	Report	2× (yellow card) 6× (suspension)	Copper Box, London; Attendance: 4,068; Referees: Marina, Minore (ARG)

31 July 2012; 16:15	Serbia	23 – 31	Croatia	Copper Box, London; Attendance: 4,827; Referees: Horáček, Novotný (CZE)
31 July 2012; 16:15	Vujin 6	(9–13)	Čupić 8	Copper Box, London; Attendance: 4,827; Referees: Horáček, Novotný (CZE)
31 July 2012; 16:15	4× (yellow card) 3× (suspension)	Report	3× (yellow card) 4× (suspension)	Copper Box, London; Attendance: 4,827; Referees: Horáček, Novotný (CZE)

2 August 2012; 14:30	Croatia	26 – 19	Hungary	Copper Box, London; Attendance: 4,950; Referees: Abrahamsen, Kristiansen (NOR)
2 August 2012; 14:30	Čupić 7	(11–9)	Császár, Nagy 4	Copper Box, London; Attendance: 4,950; Referees: Abrahamsen, Kristiansen (NOR)
2 August 2012; 14:30	3× (yellow card) 6× (suspension)	Report	3× (yellow card) 2× (suspension)	Copper Box, London; Attendance: 4,950; Referees: Abrahamsen, Kristiansen (NOR)

4 August 2012; 16:15	Croatia	32 – 21	Denmark	Copper Box, London; Attendance: 4,800; Referees: Lazaar, Reveret (FRA)
4 August 2012; 16:15	three players 5	(14–9)	Eggert Jensen, Lindberg 5	Copper Box, London; Attendance: 4,800; Referees: Lazaar, Reveret (FRA)
4 August 2012; 16:15	3× (yellow card) 2× (suspension)	Report	3× (yellow card) 3× (suspension)	Copper Box, London; Attendance: 4,800; Referees: Lazaar, Reveret (FRA)

6 August 2012; 19:30	Spain	25 – 30	Croatia	Copper Box, London; Attendance: 4,856; Referees: Geipel, Helbig (GER)
6 August 2012; 19:30	Entrerríos, Tomás 5	(10–11)	Čupić, Lacković 7	Copper Box, London; Attendance: 4,856; Referees: Geipel, Helbig (GER)
6 August 2012; 19:30	3× (yellow card) 3× (suspension)	Report	4× (yellow card) 2× (suspension)	Copper Box, London; Attendance: 4,856; Referees: Geipel, Helbig (GER)

Quarter-final

8 August 2012; 21:30	Croatia	25 – 23	Tunisia	Basketball Arena, London; Attendance: 9,578; Referees: Marina, Minore (ARG)
8 August 2012; 21:30	Čupić 8	(11–12)	Jallouz, Alouini 4	Basketball Arena, London; Attendance: 9,578; Referees: Marina, Minore (ARG)
8 August 2012; 21:30	2× (yellow card) 3× (suspension)	Report	4× (yellow card) 5× (suspension) 1× (red card)	Basketball Arena, London; Attendance: 9,578; Referees: Marina, Minore (ARG)

Semifinal

10 August 2012; 20:30	France	25 – 22	Croatia	Basketball Arena, London; Attendance: 9,849; Referees: Abrahamsen, Kristiansen (NOR)
10 August 2012; 20:30	three players 4	(12–10)	Horvat 6	Basketball Arena, London; Attendance: 9,849; Referees: Abrahamsen, Kristiansen (NOR)
10 August 2012; 20:30	4× (yellow card) 2× (suspension)	Report	4× (yellow card) 2× (suspension)	Basketball Arena, London; Attendance: 9,849; Referees: Abrahamsen, Kristiansen (NOR)

Bronze medal match

12 August 2012; 11:00	Hungary	26 – 33	Croatia	Basketball Arena, London; Attendance: 9,263; Referees: Horáček, Novotný (CZE)
12 August 2012; 11:00	Harsányi 7	(14–19)	Čupić 8	Basketball Arena, London; Attendance: 9,263; Referees: Horáček, Novotný (CZE)
12 August 2012; 11:00	4× (yellow card) 4× (suspension)	Report	3× (yellow card) 3× (suspension)	Basketball Arena, London; Attendance: 9,263; Referees: Horáček, Novotný (CZE)

=== Women's tournament ===
Roster

The following is the Croatia roster in the women's handball tournament of the 2012 Summer Olympics.

Head coaches: Vladimir Canjuga

No.	Pos.	Name	Date of birth (age)	Height	App.	Goals	Club
1	GK	Jelena Grubišić	20 January 1987 (aged 25)	1.84 m			(Slovenia) RK Krim
2	CB	Miranda Tatari	20 September 1983 (aged 28)	1.74 m			(Croatia) Podravka Koprivnica
5	LW	Dijana Jovetić	21 May 1984 (aged 28)	1.70 m			(Montenegro) ŽRK Budućnost
6	P	Andrea Šerić	3 August 1985 (aged 26)	1.84 m			(Slovenia) RK Krim
8	LW	Anita Gaće	14 April 1983 (aged 29)	1.77 m			(Croatia) Podravka Koprivnica
10	RW	Nikica Pušić-Koroljević	19 March 1983 (aged 29)	1.77 m			(Croatia) Podravka Koprivnica
13	LB	Lidija Horvat	5 May 1982 (aged 30)	1.84 m			(Croatia) Podravka Koprivnica
14	RB	Kristina Franić	22 May 1987 (aged 25)	1.80 m			(Slovenia) RK Krim
15	RB	Andrea Penezić	13 November 1985 (aged 26)	1.86 m			(Slovenia) RK Krim
16	GK	Ivana Jelčić	16 March 1980 (aged 32)	1.80 m			(Croatia) Podravka Koprivnica
18	CB	Ivana Lovrić	1 September 1984 (aged 27)	1.73 m			(Croatia) RK Samobor
19	RW	Maja Zebić	31 May 1982 (aged 30)	1.78 m			(Spain) SD Itxako
20	P	Vesna Milanović-Litre	30 May 1986 (aged 26)	1.80 m			(Croatia) Podravka Koprivnica
29	RB	Sonja Bašić	26 November 1987 (aged 24)	1.82 m			(Croatia) Lokomotiva Zagreb

Group play

Team	Pld	W	D	L	GF	GA	GD	Pts	Qualification
Brazil	5	4	0	1	137	122	+15	8	Quarter-finals
Croatia	5	4	0	1	145	115	+30	8	Quarter-finals
Russia	5	3	1	1	151	125	+26	7	Quarter-finals
Montenegro	5	2	1	2	137	123	+14	5	Quarter-finals
Angola	5	1	0	4	132	142	−10	2	
Great Britain	5	0	0	5	91	166	−75	0	

28 July 2012; 14:30	Croatia	23 – 24	Brazil	Copper Box, London; Attendance: 3,942; Referees: Bonaventura, Bonaventura (FRA)
28 July 2012; 14:30	Jovetić 6	(10–9)	do Nascimento, Amorim 5	Copper Box, London; Attendance: 3,942; Referees: Bonaventura, Bonaventura (FRA)
28 July 2012; 14:30	3× (yellow card) 4× (suspension)	Report	3× (yellow card) 6× (suspension) 1× (red card)	Copper Box, London; Attendance: 3,942; Referees: Bonaventura, Bonaventura (FRA)

30 July 2012; 09:30	Angola	23 – 28	Croatia	Copper Box, London; Attendance: 3,892; Referees: Al-Nuaimi, Omar (UAE)
30 July 2012; 09:30	Guialo, M. Kiala 5	(11–13)	Zebić 9	Copper Box, London; Attendance: 3,892; Referees: Al-Nuaimi, Omar (UAE)
30 July 2012; 09:30	2× (yellow card) 4× (suspension)	Report	3× (yellow card) 2× (suspension)	Copper Box, London; Attendance: 3,892; Referees: Al-Nuaimi, Omar (UAE)

1 August 2012; 21:15	Russia	28 – 30	Croatia	Copper Box, London; Attendance: 4,098; Referees: Marina, Minore (ARG)
1 August 2012; 21:15	Turey 6	(15–15)	Penezić 10	Copper Box, London; Attendance: 4,098; Referees: Marina, Minore (ARG)
1 August 2012; 21:15	3× (yellow card) 5× (suspension)	Report	3× (yellow card) 6× (suspension)	Copper Box, London; Attendance: 4,098; Referees: Marina, Minore (ARG)

3 August 2012; 14:30	Croatia	27 – 26	Montenegro	Copper Box, London; Attendance: 4,541; Referees: Lopez, Sabroso (ESP)
3 August 2012; 14:30	Penezić 10	(12–12)	Popović 10	Copper Box, London; Attendance: 4,541; Referees: Lopez, Sabroso (ESP)
3 August 2012; 14:30	3× (yellow card) 5× (suspension)	Report	2× (yellow card) 4× (suspension)	Copper Box, London; Attendance: 4,541; Referees: Lopez, Sabroso (ESP)

5 August 2012; 16:15	Croatia	37 – 14	Great Britain	Copper Box, London; Attendance: 4,792; Referees: Marina, Minore (ARG)
5 August 2012; 16:15	three players 5	(17–6)	Fairbrother 3	Copper Box, London; Attendance: 4,792; Referees: Marina, Minore (ARG)
5 August 2012; 16:15	3× (yellow card) 3× (suspension)	Report	3× (yellow card) 4× (suspension)	Copper Box, London; Attendance: 4,792; Referees: Marina, Minore (ARG)

Quarter-final

7 August 2012; 13:30	Spain	25 – 22	Croatia	Copper Box, London; Attendance: 4,553; Referees: Horáček, Novotný (CZE)
7 August 2012; 13:30	Pinedo 7	(13–12)	Tatari 5	Copper Box, London; Attendance: 4,553; Referees: Horáček, Novotný (CZE)
7 August 2012; 13:30	3× (yellow card) 3× (suspension)	Report	3× (yellow card) 6× (suspension)	Copper Box, London; Attendance: 4,553; Referees: Horáček, Novotný (CZE)

== Judo ==
Athlete	Event	Preliminary	Round of 32	Round of 16	Quarterfinals	Semifinals	Repechage	Final / BM	
Athlete	Event	Opposition Result	Opposition Result	Opposition Result	Opposition Result	Opposition Result	Opposition Result	Opposition Result	Rank
Tomislav Marijanović	Men's −81 kg	Bye	Tchrikishvili (GEO); L 0001–0010	Did not advance					
Marijana Mišković	Women's −63 kg	—N/a	Bye	Ueno (JPN); L 0000–0001	Did not advance				

== Rowing ==
Men

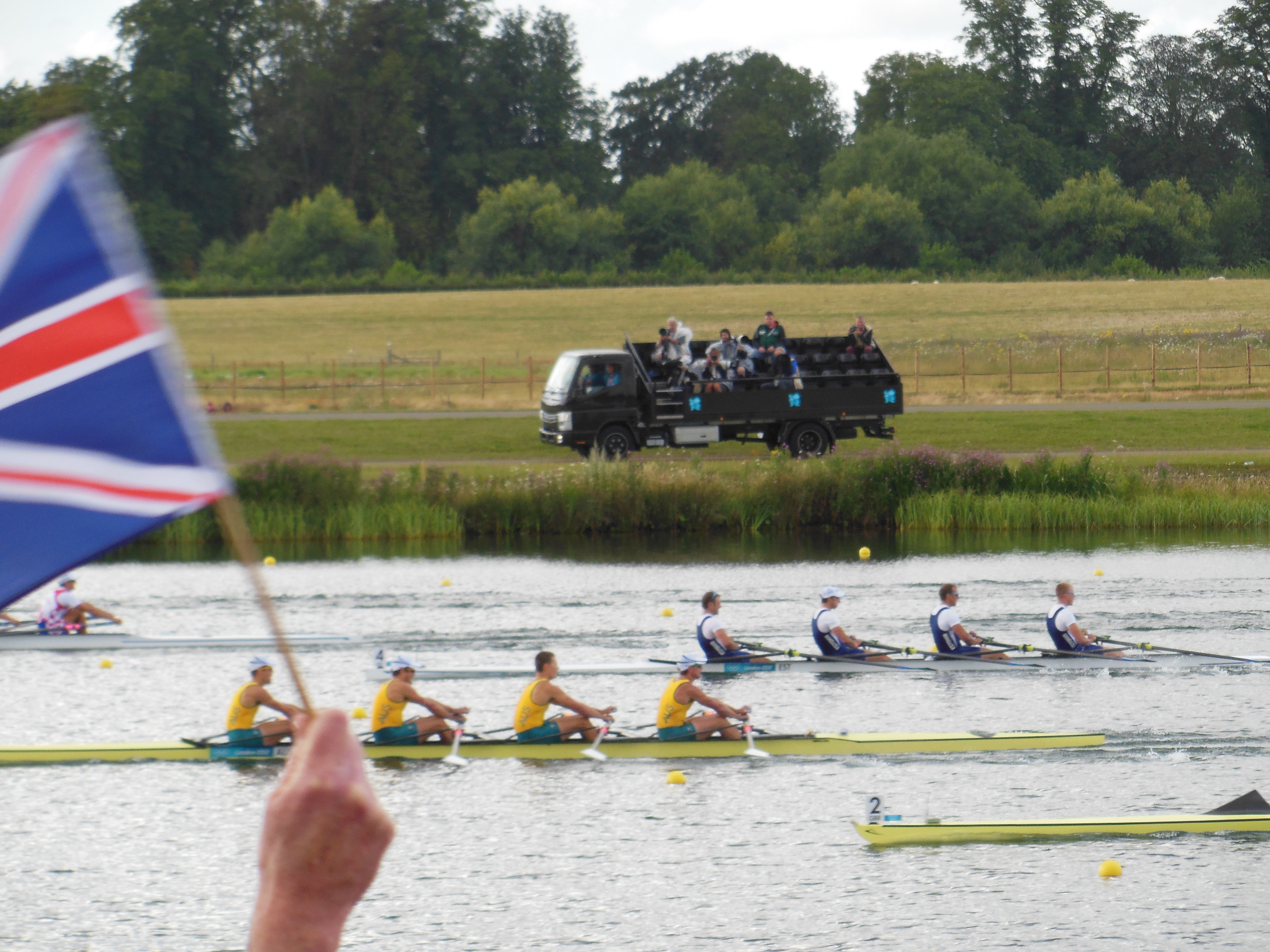
Croatia (right boat) in the final of the men's quadruple sculls rowing to silver.

Athlete	Event	Heats		Repechage		Quarterfinals		Semifinals		Final	
Athlete	Event	Time	Rank	Time	Rank	Time	Rank	Time	Rank	Time	Rank
Mario Vekić	Single sculls	7:02.63	2 QF	Bye		7:05.78	4 SC/D	7:33.51	1 FC	7:27.60	15
Damir Martin; David Šain; Martin Sinković; Valent Sinković	Quadruple sculls	5:09.38	1 SA/B	Bye		—N/a		6:03.39	1 FA	5:44.78	2nd place, silver medalist(s)

Qualification Legend: FA=Final A (medal); FB=Final B (non-medal); FC=Final C (non-medal); FD=Final D (non-medal); FE=Final E (non-medal); FF=Final F (non-medal); SA/B=Semifinals A/B; SC/D=Semifinals C/D; SE/F=Semifinals E/F; QF=Quarterfinals; R=Repechage

== Sailing ==
Croatia has qualified 1 boat for each of the following events.

Men

Athlete	Event	Race																Net points	Final rank
Athlete	Event	1	2	3	4	5	6	7	8	9	10	11	12	13	14	15	M*	Net points	Final rank
Luka Mratović	RS:X	24	19	26	20	22	11	14	16	18	~~36~~	—N/a					EL	170	21
Tonči Stipanović	Laser	5	6	~~20~~	4	3	1	8	13	6	15	—N/a					16	77	4
Ivan Kljaković Gašpić	Finn	3	3	7	9	5	6	3	7	4	10	—N/a					8	55	5
Šime Fantela; Igor Marenić	470	~~DSQ~~	13	9	10	8	5	15	1	2	22	—N/a					2	87	6
Petar Cupać; Pavle Kostov	49er	13	17	8	15	13	14	17	4	~~19~~	15	17	3	14	12	19	EL	181	17
Dan Lovrović; Marin Lovrović, Jr.	Star	8	12	~~16~~	15	14	13	14	15	12	15	—N/a					EL	116	16

Women

Athlete	Event	Race											Net points	Final rank
Athlete	Event	1	2	3	4	5	6	7	8	9	10	M*	Net points	Final rank
Tina Mihelić	Laser Radial	14	12	22	~~25~~	17	25	14	13	14	17	EL	148	17
Enia Ninčević; Romana Župan	470	4	16	13	11	~~20~~	11	8	20	19	14	EL	115	17

M = Medal race; EL = Eliminated – did not advance into the medal race;

== Shooting ==
Thanks to the wins at the 2011 ISSF World Cup competitions, 2011 European Shooting Championships and 2012 European Championships for 10 m events, Croatia has earned five quota places in shooting events.

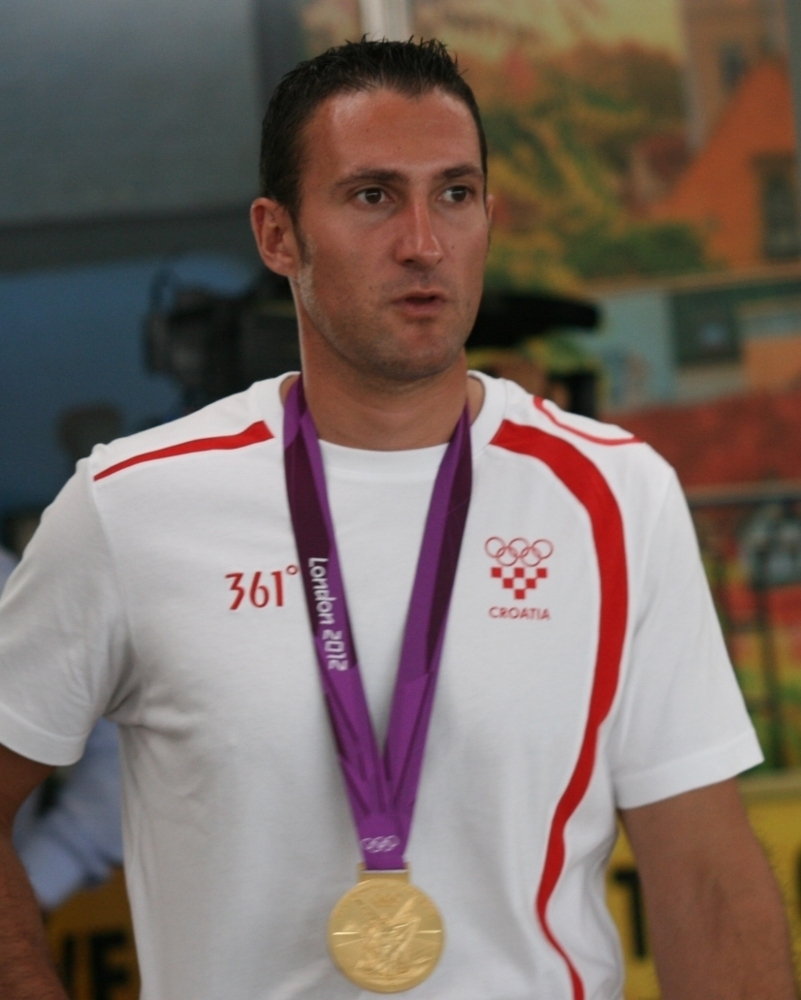
Giovanni Cernogoraz displayed his gold medal in men's trap shooting.

Men

Athlete	Event	Qualification		Final	
Athlete	Event	Points	Rank	Points	Rank
Giovanni Cernogoraz	Trap	122	6 Q	146 S/O 6 OR	1st place, gold medalist(s)
Bojan Đurković	10 m air rifle	590	36	Did not advance	
Bojan Đurković	50 m rifle 3 positions	1152	35	Did not advance	
Bojan Đurković	50 m rifle prone	595	8 Q	698	7
Anton Glasnović	Trap	122	5 Q	143	6
Anton Glasnović	Double trap	114	23	Did not advance	
Petar Gorša	10 m air rifle	586	43	Did not advance	

Women

Athlete	Event	Qualification		Final	
Athlete	Event	Points	Rank	Points	Rank
Snježana Pejčić	10 m air rifle	395	18	Did not advance	
Snježana Pejčić	50 m rifle 3 positions	584	6 Q	681.9	5

== Swimming ==
Croatian swimmers have achieved qualifying standards in the following events (up to a maximum of 2 swimmers in each event at the Olympic Qualifying Time (OQT), and 1 at the Olympic Selection Time (OST)):

Men

Athlete	Event	Heat		Semifinal		Final	
Athlete	Event	Time	Rank	Time	Rank	Time	Rank
Mario Todorović	50 m freestyle	22.75	28	Did not advance			

Women

Athlete	Event	Heat		Semifinal		Final	
Athlete	Event	Time	Rank	Time	Rank	Time	Rank
Sanja Jovanović	100 m backstroke	1:03.38	36	Did not advance			
Kim Daniela Pavlin	200 m backstroke	2:15:67	33	Did not advance			
Kim Daniela Pavlin	200 m individual medley	2:17:17	30	Did not advance			
Karla Šitić	10 km open water	—N/a				1:58:54.7	11

== Table tennis ==
Croatia has qualified four athletes for singles table tennis events. Based on his ITTF world rankings as of 16 May 2011 Zoran Primorac has qualified for the men's event.

Athlete	Event	Preliminary round	Round 1	Round 2	Round 3	Round 4	Quarterfinals	Semifinals	Final / BM	
Athlete	Event	Opposition Result	Opposition Result	Opposition Result	Opposition Result	Opposition Result	Opposition Result	Opposition Result	Opposition Result	Rank
Andrej Gaćina	Men's singles	Bye		Persson (SWE); W 4–0	Shibaev (RUS); W 4–3	Chuang C-y (TPE); L 2–4	Did not advance			
Zoran Primorac	Men's singles	Bye		Lashin (EGY); L 3–4	Did not advance					
Cornelia Molnar	Women's singles	Bye	Zhang (USA); W 4–0	Kim J (PRK); L 1–4	Did not advance					
Tian Yuan	Women's singles	Bye	Rodríguez (CHI); W 4–0	Póta (HUN); L 1–4	Did not advance					

== Taekwondo ==
Croatia has ensured berths in the following events of taekwondo by reaching the top 3 of the 2011 World Taekwondo Olympic Qualification Tournament in Baku, Azerbaijan:

Athlete	Event	Round of 16	Quarterfinals	Semifinals	Repechage	Bronze Medal	Final	
Athlete	Event	Opposition Result	Opposition Result	Opposition Result	Opposition Result	Opposition Result	Opposition Result	Rank
Lucija Zaninović	Women's −49 kg	Kang (CAF); W 14–0 PTG	López (ARG); W 13–4	Wu Jy (CHN); L 7–19	Bye	Alegría (MEX); W 1–0 SDP	Did not advance	3rd place, bronze medalist(s)
Ana Zaninović	Women's −57 kg	Hamada (JPN); L 11–14	Did not advance					

== Tennis ==
Athlete	Event	Round of 64	Round of 32	Round of 16	Quarterfinals	Semifinals	Final / BM	
Athlete	Event	Opposition Score	Opposition Score	Opposition Score	Opposition Score	Opposition Score	Opposition Score	Rank
Marin Čilić	Men's singles	Melzer (AUT); W 7–6^{(6–5)}, 6–2	Hewitt (AUS); L 4–6, 5–7	Did not advance				
Ivan Dodig	Men's singles	del Potro (ARG); L 4–6, 1–6	Did not advance					
Ivo Karlović	Men's singles	Withdrew because of injury on 26 July						
Marin Čilić; Ivan Dodig	Men's doubles	—N/a	Cabal / Giraldo (COL); W 6–3, 6–4	Brunström / Lindstedt (SWE); W 6–3, 6–2	Ferrer / F López (ESP); L 4–6, 4–6	Did not advance		
Petra Martić	Women's singles	Withdrew because of injury on 27 July						

== Water polo ==
The Croatia men's national water polo team (13 athletes) qualified for the Olympic Games by reaching the semi-finals at the 2011 World Aquatics Championships in Shanghai, People's Republic of China.

Summary

Key:

- FT – After full time.
- P – Match decided by penalty-shootout.

Team	Event	Group Stage						Quarterfinal	Semifinal	Final / BM	
Team	Event	Opposition Score	Opposition Score	Opposition Score	Opposition Score	Opposition Score	Rank	Opposition Score	Opposition Score	Opposition Score	Rank
Croatia men's	Men's tournament	Greece; W 8–6	Spain; W 8–7	Italy; W 11–6	Australia; W 11–6	Kazakhstan; W 12–4	1	United States; W 8–2	Montenegro; W 7–5	Italy; W 8–6	1st place, gold medalist(s)

=== Men's tournament ===
Roster

The following is the Croatian roster in the men's water polo tournament of the 2012 Summer Olympics.

№	Name	Pos.	Height	Weight	Date of birth	2012 club
1	Josip Pavić	GK	1.95 m (6 ft 5 in)	90 kg (198 lb)	15 January 1982	(Croatia) HAVK Mladost
2	Damir Burić	CB	2.05 m (6 ft 9 in)	115 kg (254 lb)	2 December 1980	(Italy) Pro Recco
3	Miho Bošković	D	1.96 m (6 ft 5 in)	96 kg (212 lb)	11 January 1983	(Hungary) TEVA-Vasas-UNIQA
4	Nikša Dobud	CF	1.99 m (6 ft 6 in)	118 kg (260 lb)	5 August 1985	(Croatia) VK Jug Dubrovnik
5	Maro Joković	D	2.03 m (6 ft 8 in)	95 kg (209 lb)	1 October 1987	(Croatia) VK Jug Dubrovnik
6	Ivan Buljubašić	CB	1.98 m (6 ft 6 in)	108 kg (238 lb)	31 October 1987	(Croatia) Primorje EB
7	Petar Muslim	D	2.00 m (6 ft 7 in)	102 kg (225 lb)	26 March 1988	(Croatia) Primorje EB
8	Andro Bušlje	CB	2.00 m (6 ft 7 in)	115 kg (254 lb)	4 January 1986	(Croatia) VK Jug Dubrovnik
9	Sandro Sukno	D	2.00 m (6 ft 7 in)	93 kg (205 lb)	30 June 1990	(Italy) Pro Recco
10	Samir Barač	D	1.87 m (6 ft 2 in)	89 kg (196 lb)	2 November 1973	(Croatia) Primorje EB
11	Igor Hinić	CF	2.02 m (6 ft 8 in)	110 kg (243 lb)	4 December 1975	(Croatia) HAVK Mladost
12	Paulo Obradović	D	1.90 m (6 ft 3 in)	100 kg (220 lb)	9 March 1986	(Croatia) VK Jug Dubrovnik
13	Frano Vićan	GK	1.92 m (6 ft 4 in)	94 kg (207 lb)	24 January 1976	(Croatia) VK Jug Dubrovnik

Head coach: Ratko Rudić

Group play

Team	Pld	W	D	L	GF	GA	GD	Pts	Qualification
Croatia	5	5	0	0	50	29	+21	10	Quarterfinals
Italy	5	3	1	1	40	36	+4	7	Quarterfinals
Spain	5	3	0	2	52	42	+10	6	Quarterfinals
Australia	5	2	0	3	40	44	−4	4	Quarterfinals
Greece	5	1	1	3	41	43	−2	3	
Kazakhstan	5	0	0	5	24	53	−29	0	

29 July 2012; 10:00	Report	Greece	6–8	Croatia	Water Polo Arena, London; Referees: Adrian Alexandrescu (ROU), György Juhász (HUN)
29 July 2012; 10:00	Report	Score by quarters: 2–1, 1–2, 2–2, 1–3			Water Polo Arena, London; Referees: Adrian Alexandrescu (ROU), György Juhász (HUN)
29 July 2012; 10:00	Report	Fountoulis, Mourikis 2	Goals	three players 2	Water Polo Arena, London; Referees: Adrian Alexandrescu (ROU), György Juhász (HUN)

31 July 2012; 11:20	Report	Croatia	8–7	Spain	Water Polo Arena, London; Referees: Boris Margeta (SLO), Radoslaw Koryzna (POL)
31 July 2012; 11:20	Report	Score by quarters: 2–1, 3–2, 2–4, 1–0			Water Polo Arena, London; Referees: Boris Margeta (SLO), Radoslaw Koryzna (POL)
31 July 2012; 11:20	Report	Sukno, Dobud 2	Goals	Español 4	Water Polo Arena, London; Referees: Boris Margeta (SLO), Radoslaw Koryzna (POL)

2 August 2012; 19:40	Report	Italy	6–11	Croatia	Water Polo Arena, London; Referees: Gyorgy Juhasz (HUN), Adrian Alexandrescu (ROU)
2 August 2012; 19:40	Report	Score by quarters: 3–4, 1–1, 1–3, 1–3			Water Polo Arena, London; Referees: Gyorgy Juhasz (HUN), Adrian Alexandrescu (ROU)
2 August 2012; 19:40	Report	Figlioli, Gallo 2	Goals	Bošković, Sukno 3	Water Polo Arena, London; Referees: Gyorgy Juhasz (HUN), Adrian Alexandrescu (ROU)

4 August 2012; 11:20	Report	Croatia	11–6	Australia	Water Polo Arena, London; Referees: Ulrich Spiegel (GER), Gyorgy Juhasz (HUN)
4 August 2012; 11:20	Report	Score by quarters: 2–1, 3–1, 3–2, 3–2			Water Polo Arena, London; Referees: Ulrich Spiegel (GER), Gyorgy Juhasz (HUN)
4 August 2012; 11:20	Report	Joković 3	Goals	Whalan 3	Water Polo Arena, London; Referees: Ulrich Spiegel (GER), Gyorgy Juhasz (HUN)

6 August 2012; 10:00	Report	Kazakhstan	4–12	Croatia	Water Polo Arena, London; Referees: German Moller (ARG), Brian Littlejohn (GBR)
6 August 2012; 10:00	Report	Score by quarters: 0–4, 1–1, 2–4, 1–3			Water Polo Arena, London; Referees: German Moller (ARG), Brian Littlejohn (GBR)
6 August 2012; 10:00	Report	Zhilyayev 2	Goals	Dobud 5	Water Polo Arena, London; Referees: German Moller (ARG), Brian Littlejohn (GBR)

Quarter-final

8 August 2012; 20:00	Report	Croatia	8–2	United States	Water Polo Arena, London; Referees: Massimiliano Caputi (ITA), György Juhász (HUN)
8 August 2012; 20:00	Report	Score by quarters: 2–0, 3–0, 2–2, 1–0			Water Polo Arena, London; Referees: Massimiliano Caputi (ITA), György Juhász (HUN)
8 August 2012; 20:00	Report	Bošković, Obradović 2	Goals	Bailey, Varellas 1	Water Polo Arena, London; Referees: Massimiliano Caputi (ITA), György Juhász (HUN)

Semifinal

10 August 2012; 15:40	Report	Croatia	7–5	Montenegro	Water Polo Arena, London; Referees: Daniel Flahive (AUS), Georgios Stavridis (GRE)
10 August 2012; 15:40	Report	Score by quarters: 3–1, 2–0, 2–2, 0–2			Water Polo Arena, London; Referees: Daniel Flahive (AUS), Georgios Stavridis (GRE)
10 August 2012; 15:40	Report	Sukno 2	Goals	Ivović, Gojković 2	Water Polo Arena, London; Referees: Daniel Flahive (AUS), Georgios Stavridis (GRE)

Gold medal match

12 August 2012; 15:50	Report	(gold) Croatia	8–6	Italy (silver)	Water Polo Arena, London; Referees: Sergi Sancherz (ESP), Gyorgy Juhasz (HUN)
12 August 2012; 15:50	Report	Score by quarters: 1–2, 2–0, 2–1, 3–3			Water Polo Arena, London; Referees: Sergi Sancherz (ESP), Gyorgy Juhasz (HUN)
12 August 2012; 15:50	Report	Joković 3	Goals	Felugo 3	Water Polo Arena, London; Referees: Sergi Sancherz (ESP), Gyorgy Juhasz (HUN)

== Wrestling ==
Key

- VT - Victory by Fall.
- PP - Decision by Points - the loser with technical points.
- PO - Decision by Points - the loser without technical points.

Men's Greco-Roman

Athlete	Event	Qualification	Round of 16	Quarterfinal	Semifinal	Repechage 1	Repechage 2	Final / BM	
Athlete	Event	Opposition Result	Opposition Result	Opposition Result	Opposition Result	Opposition Result	Opposition Result	Opposition Result	Rank
Neven Žugaj	−74 kg	Tolba (EGY); W 3–0 ^{PO}	Ahmadov (AZE); L 0–3 ^{PO}	Did not advance					10
Nenad Žugaj	−84 kg	Bye	Gaber (EGY); L 1–3 ^{PP}	Did not advance		Noumonvi (FRA); L 0–3 ^{PO}	Did not advance		14
