= Argentina at the 2012 Summer Olympics =

- IOC code: ARG
- NOC: Argentine Olympic Committee
- Website: www.coarg.org.ar (in Spanish)

in London
- Competitors: 137 in 22 sports
- Flag bearers: Luciana Aymar (opening); Sebastián Crismanich (closing)
- Medals Ranked 42nd: Gold 1 Silver 1 Bronze 2 Total 4

Summer Olympics appearances (overview)
- 1900; 1904; 1908; 1912; 1920; 1924; 1928; 1932; 1936; 1948; 1952; 1956; 1960; 1964; 1968; 1972; 1976; 1980; 1984; 1988; 1992; 1996; 2000; 2004; 2008; 2012; 2016; 2020; 2024; 2028

Argentina competed at the 2012 Summer Olympics in London, United Kingdom, from 27 July to 12 August 2012. This was the nation's twenty-third appearance at the Summer Olympic Games, having missed only three editions: the 1904 Summer Olympics in St. Louis, the 1912 Summer Olympics in Stockholm, and the 1980 Summer Olympics in Moscow, because of its support for the United States-led boycott.

Comité Olímpico Argentino sent a total of 137 athletes to the Games, 96 men and 41 women, to compete in 22 sports. Archery, badminton, diving, football, modern pentathlon, water polo, weightlifting, rhythmic gymnastics and trampoline were the only sports in which Argentina had no representation in these Olympic Games. Among the sports, Argentina made its Olympic debut in synchronized swimming and men's handball. Luciana Aymar, captain of Argentina women's national field hockey team, who competed at her fourth Olympics, was the nation's flag bearer at the opening ceremony.

Argentina left London with a total of four medals (gold, silver, and two bronze). Sebastián Crismanich set a historic Olympic record, as he won its first ever gold medal in men's taekwondo, and the first by an individual athlete since 1948. Other notable accomplishments were the silver medal in field hockey for the women's team, and bronze medals in sailing and in men's tennis, the latter won by Juan Martín del Potro.

== Medalists ==
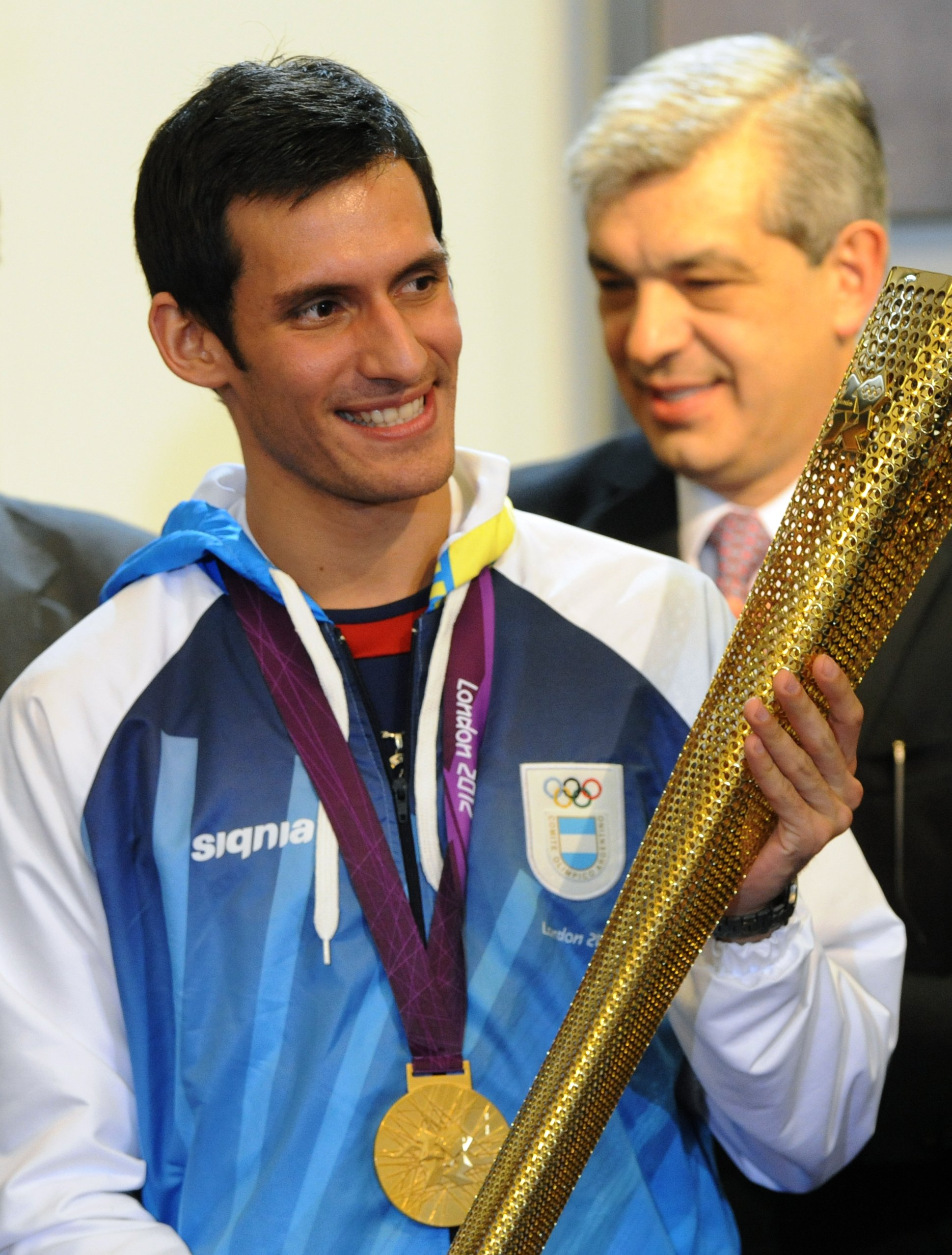
Taekwondo jin Sebastián Crismanich became Argentina's only gold medalist at these Games.

Medal	Name	Sport	Event	Date
Gold	Sebastián Crismanich	Taekwondo	Men's 80 kg	10 August
Silver	Argentina women's national field hockey team: Luciana Aymar; Noel Barrionuevo; Martina Cavallero; Laura del Colle; Silvina D'Elía; Florencia Habif; Rosario Luchetti; Sofía Maccari; Delfina Merino; Florencia Mutio; Carla Rebecchi; Macarena Rodríguez; Rocío Sánchez Moccia; Mariela Scarone; Daniela Sruoga; Josefina Sruoga	Field hockey	Women's tournament	10 August
Bronze	Juan Martín del Potro	Tennis	Men's singles	5 August
Bronze	Lucas Calabrese; Juan de la Fuente	Sailing	Men's 470	10 August

== Athletics ==
Argentine athletes achieved qualifying standards in the following athletics events (up to a maximum of 3 athletes in each event at the 'A' Standard, and 1 at the 'B' Standard):

Key

- Note–Ranks given for track events are within the athlete's heat only
- Q = Qualified for the next round
- q = Qualified for the next round as a fastest loser or, in field events, by position without achieving the qualifying target
- NR = National record
- N/A = Round not applicable for the event
- Bye = Athlete not required to compete in round
- NM = No mark

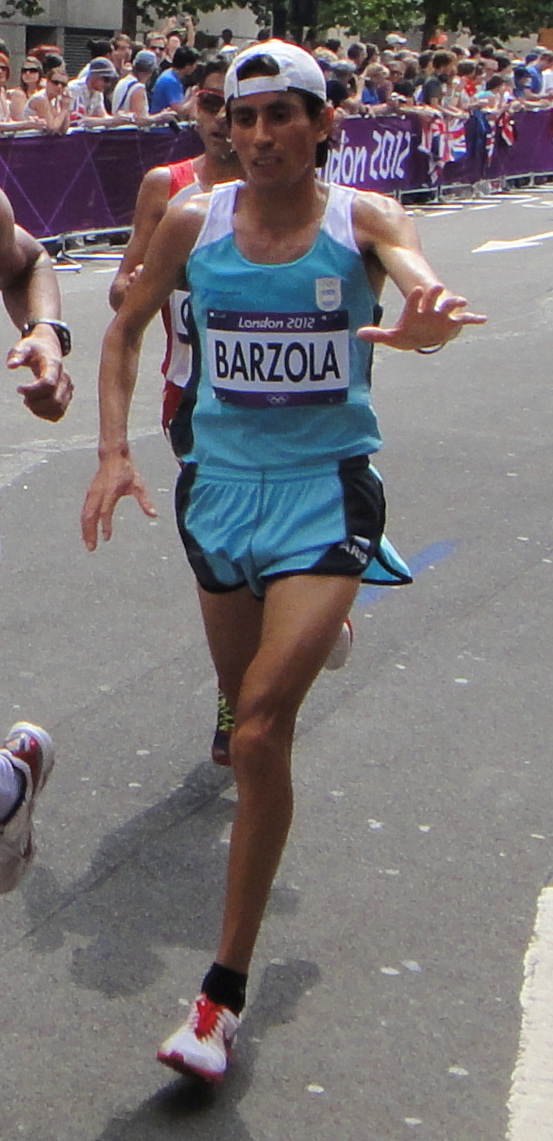
Miguel Bárzola finished thirty-fifth in men's marathon.

Men
Track & road events

Athlete	Event	Heat		Final	
Athlete	Event	Result	Rank	Result	Rank
Miguel Bárzola	Marathon	—N/a		2:17:54	35
Juan Manuel Cano	20 km walk	—N/a		1:22:10	22
Javier Carriqueo	5000 m	13:57.07	19	did not advance	

Field events

Athlete	Event	Qualification		Final	
Athlete	Event	Distance	Position	Distance	Position
Juan Ignacio Cerra	Hammer throw	68.20	36	did not advance	
Germán Lauro	Shot put	20.75	5 Q	20.84	6
Germán Lauro	Discus throw	57.54	37	did not advance	
Braian Toledo	Javelin throw	76.87	30	did not advance	

Women
Track & road events

Athlete	Event	Final	
Athlete	Event	Result	Rank
María de los Ángeles Peralta	Marathon	2:40:50	82

Field events

Athlete	Event	Qualification		Final	
Athlete	Event	Distance	Position	Distance	Position
Rocío Comba	Discus throw	58.98	26	did not advance	
Jennifer Dahlgren	Hammer throw	NM	—	did not advance	

== Basketball ==
Argentina qualified for the men's event.

=== Men's tournament ===
Roster

The following is the Argentina roster in the men's basketball tournament of the 2012 Summer Olympics.

Argentina men's national basketball team – 2012 Summer Olympics roster
Players
Coaches

Pos.	No.	Name	Age – Date of birth	Height	Club
F	4	Luis Scola	32 – 30 April 1980	2.07 m (6 ft 9 in)	Phoenix Suns
G	5	Manu Ginóbili	35 – 28 July 1977	1.98 m (6 ft 6 in)	San Antonio Spurs
F	6	Marcos Mata	25 – 1 August 1986	2.01 m (6 ft 7 in)	Peñarol de Mar del Plata
G	7	Facundo Campazzo	21 – 23 March 1991	1.79 m (5 ft 10 in)	Peñarol de Mar del Plata
G	8	Pablo Prigioni	35 – 17 May 1977	1.91 m (6 ft 3 in)	New York Knicks
C	9	Juan Pedro Gutiérrez	28 – 10 October 1983	2.05 m (6 ft 9 in)	Obras Sanitarias
G	10	Carlos Delfino	29 – 29 August 1982	2.00 m (6 ft 7 in)	Milwaukee Bucks
C	11	Martín Leiva	32 – 23 April 1980	2.10 m (6 ft 11 in)	Peñarol de Mar del Plata
F	12	Leonardo Gutiérrez	34 – 16 May 1978	2.01 m (6 ft 7 in)	Peñarol de Mar del Plata
F	13	Andrés Nocioni	32 – 30 November 1979	2.01 m (6 ft 7 in)	Caja Laboral
F	14	Hernán Jasen	34 – 4 February 1978	1.99 m (6 ft 6 in)	CB Sevilla
F	15	Federico Kammerichs	32 – 21 June 1980	2.02 m (6 ft 8 in)	Regatas Corrientes

Head coach

- Julio Lamas

Legend

- Club – describes last
  club before the tournament
- Age – describes age
  on 29 July 2012

Group stage

Pos	Team	Pld	W	L	PF	PA	PD	Pts	Qualification
1	United States	5	5	0	589	398	+191	10	Quarterfinals
2	France	5	4	1	376	378	−2	9	Quarterfinals
3	Argentina	5	3	2	448	424	+24	8	Quarterfinals
4	Lithuania	5	2	3	395	399	−4	7	Quarterfinals
5	Nigeria	5	1	4	338	456	−118	6	
6	Tunisia	5	0	5	320	411	−91	5	

Source: FIBA archive
Rules for classification: 1) points; 2) head-to-head points; 3) head-to-head goal average; 4) head-to-head number of points scored.

29 July 2012
22:15

Report

Argentina	102–79	Lithuania
Scoring by quarter: 24–23, 27–16, 27–22, 24–18
Pts: Scola 32; Rebs: Ginóbili 10; Asts: Ginóbili, Prigioni 6		Pts: Kleiza 20; Rebs: Kleiza 7 Asts: Kalnietis 5

Basketball Arena, London
Referees: Carl Jungebrand (FIN), Jorge Carrion (PUR), Vaughan Mayberry (AUS)

31 July 2012
20:00

Report

France	71–64	Argentina
Scoring by quarter: 19–12, 13–17, 23–24, 16–11
Pts: Parker 17; Rebs: Batum 7 Asts: Parker 5		Pts: Ginóbili 26; Rebs: Scola 8 Asts: Prigioni 8

Basketball Arena, London
Referees: Juan Arteaga (ESP), Marcos Benito (BRA), Luigi Lamonica (ITA)

2 August 2012
14:30

Report

Argentina	92–69	Tunisia
Scoring by quarter: 14–28, 26–12, 31–16, 21–13
Pts: Ginóbili 24; Rebs: Scola 10; Asts: Campazzo 7		Pts: Mejri 19; Rebs: Mejri 14; Asts: Laghnej 6

Basketball Arena, London
Referees: Guerrino Cerebuch (ITA), Michael Aylen (AUS), Borys Ryschyk (UKR)

4 August 2012
22:15

Report

Nigeria	79–93	Argentina
Scoring by quarter: 19–37, 18–20, 20–19, 22–17
Pts: Diogu 16; Rebs: Diogu 11; Asts: Aminu 5		Pts: Scola 22; Rebs: Nocioni 6 Asts: Ginóbili 8

Basketball Arena, London
Referees: Cristiano Maranho (BRA), Michael Aylen (AUS), Samir Abaakil (MAR)

6 August 2012
22:15

Report

Argentina	97–126	United States
Scoring by quarter: 32–34, 27–26, 17–42, 21–24
Pts: Ginóbili 16; Rebs: Ginóbili 5 Asts: Campazzo 7		Pts: Durant 28; Rebs: Iguodala, Love 9 Asts: Paul 7

Basketball Arena, London
Referees: Christos Christodoulou (GRE), Ilija Belošević (SRB), Stephen Seibel (CAN)

Quarter-final

8 August 2012
20:00

Report

Brazil	77–82	Argentina
Scoring by quarter: 26–23, 14–23, 14–18, 23–18
Pts: Barbosa, Huertas 22; Rebs: Hilário 12; Asts: Huertas 5		Pts: Scola 17; Rebs: Ginóbili 8 Asts: Prigioni 8

North Greenwich Arena, London
Referees: Juan Arteaga (ESP), José Carrion (PUR), Recep Ankaralı (TUR)

Semifinal

10 August 2012
21:00

Report

Argentina	83–109	United States
Scoring by quarter: 19–24, 21–23, 17–27, 26–35
Pts: Ginobili 18; Rebs: Delfino 5 Asts: Prigioni 6		Pts: Durant 19; Rebs: Love 9 Asts: James, Paul 7

North Greenwich Arena, London
Referees: Carl Jungebrand (FIN), Recep Ankaralı (TUR), Robert Lottermoser (GER)

Bronze Medal Match

12 August 2012
11:00

Report

Argentina	77–81	Russia (bronze)
Scoring by quarter: 20–19, 18–21, 19–21, 20–20
Pts: Ginobili 21; Rebs: Nocioni 7 Asts: Prigioni 7		Pts: Shved 25; Rebs: Kirilenko 8 Asts: Shved 7

North Greenwich Arena, London
Referees: Juan Arteaga (ESP), José Carrion (PUR), Bill Kennedy (USA)

== Boxing ==
Argentina qualified two boxers.

Men

Athlete	Event	Round of 32	Round of 16	Quarterfinals	Semifinals	Final	
Athlete	Event	Opposition Result	Opposition Result	Opposition Result	Opposition Result	Opposition Result	Rank
Alberto Melián	Bantamweight	Vodopiyanov (RUS); L 5–12	did not advance				
Yamil Peralta	Heavyweight	—N/a	Bouloudinat (ALG); W 13–5	Pulev (BUL); L 10–13	did not advance		

== Canoeing ==
=== Slalom ===
Argentina qualified boats for the following events

Athlete	Event	Preliminary						Semifinal		Final	
Athlete	Event	Run 1	Rank	Run 2	Rank	Best	Rank	Time	Rank	Time	Rank
Sebastián Rossi	Men's C-1	109.41	14	107.52	14	107.52	16	did not advance			

=== Sprint ===
Argentina qualified boats for the following events.

Athlete	Event	Heats		Semifinals		Final	
Athlete	Event	Time	Rank	Time	Rank	Time	Rank
Miguel Correa; Rubén Voisard	Men's K-2 200 m	33.623	3 Q	33.105	3 FA	35.271	5

Qualification Legend: FA = Qualify to final (medal); FB = Qualify to final B (non-medal)

== Cycling ==
=== Road ===
Athlete	Event	Time	Rank
Maximiliano Richeze	Men's road race	6:04:27	110

=== Track ===
Omnium

Athlete	Event	Flying lap		Points race		Elimination race	Individual pursuit		Scratch race	Time trial		Total points	Rank
Athlete	Event	Time	Rank	Points	Rank	Rank	Time	Rank	Rank	Time	Rank	Total points	Rank
Walter Pérez	Men's omnium	14.036	17	26	7	4	4:33.532	15	12	1:07.523	17	72	14

=== Mountain biking ===
Athlete	Event	Time	Rank
Catriel Soto	Men's cross-country	1:35:13	26

=== BMX ===
Athlete	Event	Seeding		Quarterfinal		Semifinal		Final	
Athlete	Event	Result	Rank	Points	Rank	Points	Rank	Result	Rank
Ernesto Pizarro	Men's BMX	39.765	26	26	6	did not advance			

== Equestrian ==
Argentina qualified two riders

=== Jumping ===
Athlete	Horse	Event	Qualification								Final					Total	
Athlete	Horse	Event	Round 1		Round 2			Round 3			Round A		Round B			Total	
Athlete	Horse	Event	Penalties	Rank	Penalties	Total	Rank	Penalties	Total	Rank	Penalties	Rank	Penalties	Total	Rank	Penalties	Rank
José Maria Larocca	Royal Power	Individual	4	=42 Q	4	8	=31 Q	12	20	=38 R	20	38	did not advance			20	38
Alejandro Madorno	Milano de Flore	Individual	9	64	Did not advance											9	64

== Fencing ==
Argentina qualified 1 fencer.

Women

Athlete	Event	Round of 32	Round of 16	Quarterfinal	Semifinal	Final	
Athlete	Event	Opposition Score	Opposition Score	Opposition Score	Opposition Score	Opposition Score	Rank
María Belén Pérez Maurice	Individual sabre	Marzocca (ITA); L 10–15	did not advance				

== Field hockey ==
Argentina qualified for the men's and women's event

- Men's team event – 1 team of 16 players
- Women's team event – 1 team of 16 players

=== Men's tournament ===
Roster

The following is the Argentina roster in the men's field hockey tournament of the 2012 Summer Olympics.

Head Coach: Pablo Lombi

1. Juan Manuel Vivaldi (GK)
3. Ignacio Bergner
4. Matías Vila (C)
5. Pedro Ibarra
7. Facundo Callioni
8. Lucas Rey
9. Rodrigo Vila
10. Matias Enrique Paredes
11. Lucas Cammareri
12. Lucas Vila
17. Juan Martín Lopez
18. Santiago Montelli
24. Manuel Brunet
26. Agustin Mazzilli
27. Lucas Rossi
28. Gonzalo Peillat

Reserves:

15. Juan Espinosa (GK)
23. Matías González

Group play

Pos	Team	Pld	W	D	L	GF	GA	GD	Pts	Qualification
1	Australia	5	3	2	0	23	5	+18	11	Semi-finals
2	Great Britain (H)	5	2	3	0	14	8	+6	9	Semi-finals
3	Spain	5	2	2	1	8	10	−2	8	Fifth place game
4	Pakistan	5	2	1	2	9	16	−7	7	Seventh place game
5	Argentina	5	1	1	3	10	14	−4	4	Ninth place game
6	South Africa	5	0	1	4	11	22	−11	1	Eleventh place game

Source: FIH
(H) Hosts

30 July 2012
19:00

Great Britain	4–1	Argentina
Middleton 22', 42'; Fox 49'; Smith 53'	Report	Ibarra 55'

Umpires:
Raghu Prasad (IND)
Christian Blasch (GER)

1 August 2012
19:00

Pakistan	2–0	Argentina
Imran 30'; Abbas 44'	Report

Umpires:
John Wright (RSA)
Marcin Grochal (POL)

3 August 2012
08:30

Australia	2–2	Argentina
Butturini 12'; Dwyer 35'	Report	M. Vila 37'; Peillat 68'

Umpires:
Raghu Prasad (IND)
John Wright (RSA)

5 August 2012
21:15

Argentina	1–3	Spain
L. Vila 55'	Report	Quemada 66'; Delas 67'; Tubau 70'

Umpires:
Hamish Jamson (GBR)
Tim Pullman (AUS)

7 August 2012
13:45

Argentina	6–3	South Africa
Peillat 25', 39', 65'; Rossi 33'; Callioni 45', 50'	Report	Reid-Ross 7'; Norris-Jones 8'; Robinson 64'

Umpires:
Raghu Prasad (IND)
Nathan Stagno (GIB)

Ninth and Tenth Place

9 August 2012
08:30

Argentina	1–3	New Zealand
Ibarra 59'	Report	Jenness 4'; Petherick 21'; Wilson 29'

Umpires:
Marcin Grochal (POL)
Tim Pullman (AUS)

=== Women's tournament ===
The following is the Argentina roster in the women's field hockey tournament of the 2012 Summer Olympics.

Head Coach: Carlos Retegui

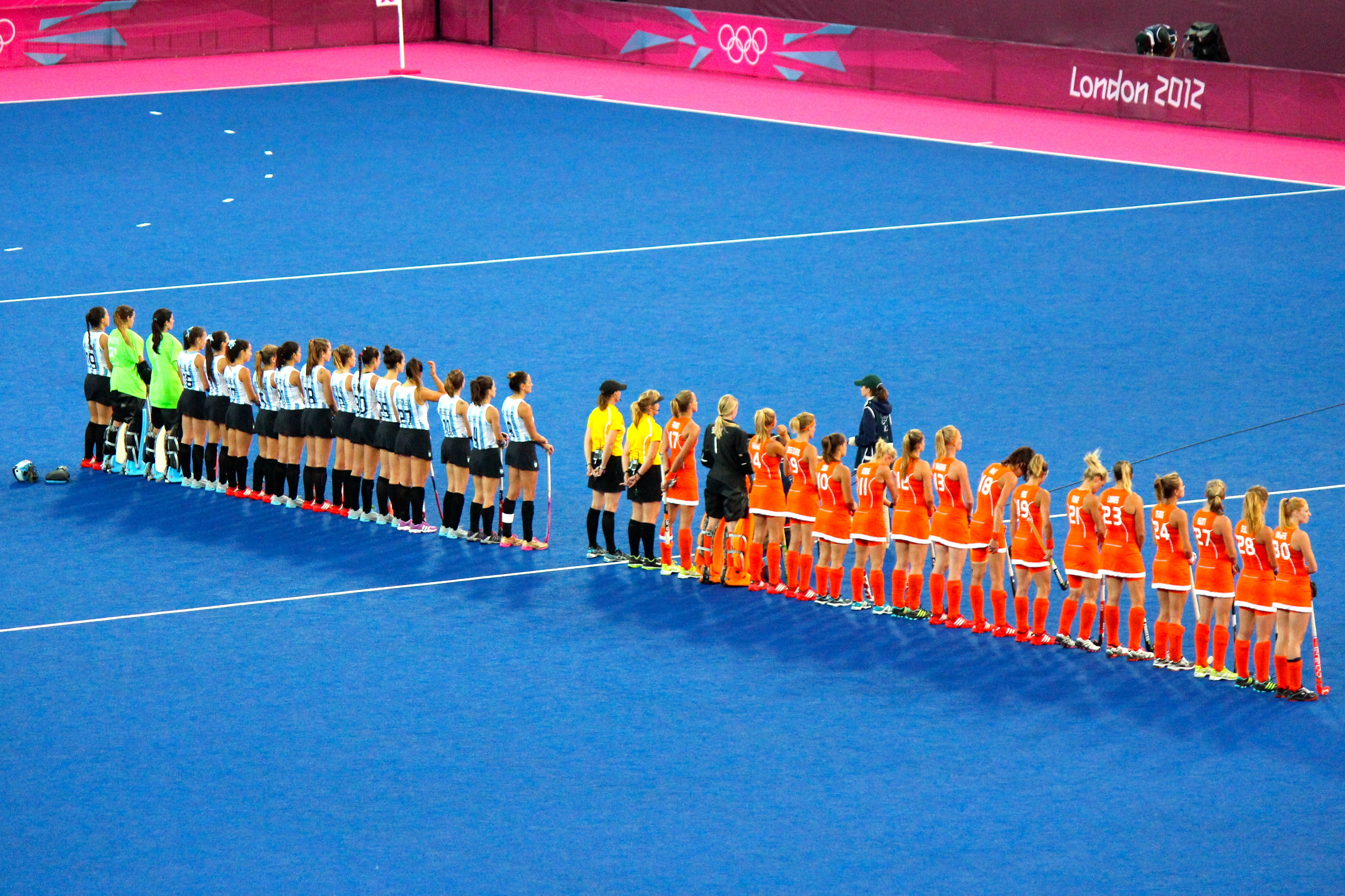
Argentina women's hockey team (in white/blue) before the final against Netherlands

1. Laura del Colle (GK)
4. Rosario Luchetti
5. Macarena Rodríguez
7. Martina Cavallero
8. Luciana Aymar (C)
11. Carla Rebecchi
12. Delfina Merino
16. Florencia Habif
17. Rocío Sánchez Moccia
18. Daniela Sruoga
19. Sofía Maccari
21. Mariela Scarone
25. Silvina D'Elía
27. Noel Barrionuevo
30. Josefina Sruoga
31. Florencia Mutio (GK)

Reserves:

- Julieta Franco
- Carla Dupuy

Group play

Pos	Team	Pld	W	D	L	GF	GA	GD	Pts	Qualification
1	Argentina	5	3	1	1	12	4	+8	10	Semi-finals
2	New Zealand	5	3	1	1	9	5	+4	10	Semi-finals
3	Australia	5	3	1	1	5	2	+3	10	
4	Germany	5	2	1	2	6	7	−1	7	
5	South Africa	5	1	0	4	9	14	−5	3	
6	United States	5	1	0	4	4	13	−9	3	

Source: FIH
Rules for classification: 1) Points; 2) Matches won; 3) Goal difference; 4) Goals for; 5) Head-to-head result.

29 July 2012
16:00

Argentina	7–1	South Africa
Aymar 8', 29'; J. Sruoga 20'; Cavallero 25'; Rebecchi 31'; Barrionuevo 62'; D'Elía 68'	Report	Chamberlain 23'

Umpires:
Miao Lin (CHN)
Lisa Roach (AUS)

31 July 2012
19:00

Argentina	0–1	United States
	Report	Taylor 28'

Umpires:
Claire Adenot (FRA)
Julie Ashton-Lucy (AUS)

2 August 2012
21:15

New Zealand	1–2	Argentina
C. Harrison 62'	Report	Rebecchi 3', 45'

Umpires:
Lisa Roach (AUS)
Carol Metchette (IRL)

4 August 2012
21:15

Germany	1–3	Argentina
Hasselmann 67'	Report	Maccari 13'; Aymar 28'; Sánchez Moccia 67'

Umpires:
Julie Ashton-Lucy (AUS)
Chieko Soma (JPN)

6 August 2012
21:15

Argentina	0–0	Australia
	Report

Umpires:
Kang Hyun-young (KOR)
Michelle Joubert (RSA)

Semi-final

8 August 2012
20:00

Argentina	2–1	Great Britain
Barrionuevo 6'; Rebecchi 31'	Report	Danson 65'

Umpires:
Lisa Roach (AUS)
Carol Metchette (IRL)

Final

10 August 2012
20:00

(gold) Netherlands	2–0	Argentina (silver)
Dirkse van den Heuvel 45'; Paumen 54'	Report 1 Report 2

Umpires:
Julie Ashton-Lucy (AUS)
Lisa Roach (AUS)

Final rank

(silver) Silver Medal

== Gymnastics ==
=== Artistic ===
Men

Athlete	Event	Qualification								Final							
Athlete	Event	Apparatus						Total	Rank	Apparatus						Total	Rank
Athlete	Event	F	PH	R	V	PB	HB	Total	Rank	F	PH	R	V	PB	HB	Total	Rank
Federico Molinari	Floor	13.433	—N/a					13.433	62	did not advance							
Federico Molinari	Rings	—N/a		15.333	—N/a			15.333	7 Q	—N/a		14.733	—N/a			14.733	8

Women

Athlete	Event	Qualification						Final					
Athlete	Event	Apparatus				Total	Rank	Apparatus				Total	Rank
Athlete	Event	F	V	UB	BB	Total	Rank	F	V	UB	BB	Total	Rank
Valeria Pereyra	All-around	12.600	13.366	13.266	10.566	49.798	51	did not advance					

== Handball ==
Argentina qualified for the men's event

- Men's team event – 1 team of 14 players

=== Men's tournament ===
The following is the Argentina roster in the men's handball tournament of the 2012 Summer Olympics.

Head coaches: Eduardo Gallardo

No.	Pos.	Name	Date of birth (age)	Height	App.	Goals	Club
1	GK	Matías Schulz	12 February 1982 (aged 30)	1.90 m			(Spain) Anaitasuna Pamplona
2	LW	Federico Gastón Fernández	17 October 1989 (aged 22)	1.88 m			(Spain) BM Ciudad Encantada
3	RW	Federico Pizarro	7 September 1986 (aged 25)	1.90 m			(Argentina) Cedalo
4	LB	Sebastián Simonet	12 May 1986 (aged 26)	1.90 m			(France) US Ivry Handball
5	LB	Pablo Sebastián Portela	21 June 1980 (aged 32)	1.90 m			(Argentina) River Plate
6	CB	Diego Simonet	26 December 1989 (aged 22)	1.90 m			(France) US Ivry Handball
7	RW	Andrés Kogovsek	7 January 1974 (aged 38)	1.90 m			(Argentina) Villa Ballester
8	P	Mariano Cánepa	7 May 1987 (aged 25)	1.87 m			(Argentina) Villa Ballester
9	RB	Leonardo Facundo Querín	17 April 1982 (aged 30)	1.97 m			(Austria) Union Juri Leoben
10	RB	Federico Matías Vieyra	21 July 1988 (aged 24)	1.92 m			(Spain) BM Huesca
11	LB	Guido Riccobelli	28 November 1987 (aged 24)	1.85 m			(Argentina) U.N.LU.
12	GK	Fernando Gabriel García	31 August 1981 (aged 30)	1.90 m			(France) S.M.V.
15	P	Gonzalo Carou	15 August 1979 (aged 32)	1.94 m			(Spain) CB Ademar León
17	RB	Damián Migueles	24 November 1983 (aged 28)	1.92 m			(Argentina) SAG Polvorines
19	LB	Juan Manuel Vázquez	23 March 1988 (aged 24)	1.90 m			(Argentina) River Plate

Group play

Team	Pld	W	D	L	GF	GA	GD	Pts	Qualification
Iceland	5	5	0	0	167	132	+35	10	Quarter-finals
France	5	4	0	1	159	110	+49	8	Quarter-finals
Sweden	5	3	0	2	156	115	+41	6	Quarter-finals
Tunisia	5	2	0	3	121	125	−4	4	Quarter-finals
Argentina	5	1	0	4	113	138	−25	2	
Great Britain	5	0	0	5	96	192	−96	0	

29 July 2012; 09:30	Iceland	31 – 25	Argentina	Copper Box, London; Attendance: 3,701; Referees: Geipel, Helbig (GER)
29 July 2012; 09:30	Sigurðsson 9	(15–14)	D. Simonet 5	Copper Box, London; Attendance: 3,701; Referees: Geipel, Helbig (GER)
29 July 2012; 09:30	3× (yellow card) 6× (suspension)	Report	3× (yellow card) 1× (suspension)	Copper Box, London; Attendance: 3,701; Referees: Geipel, Helbig (GER)

31 July 2012; 21:15	Argentina	20 – 32	France	Copper Box, London; Attendance: 3,906; Referees: Olesen, Peders (DEN)
31 July 2012; 21:15	Fernández, Riccobelli 4	(9–17)	Karabatić 7	Copper Box, London; Attendance: 3,906; Referees: Olesen, Peders (DEN)
31 July 2012; 21:15	3× (yellow card) 2× (suspension)	Report	3× (yellow card) 2× (suspension)	Copper Box, London; Attendance: 3,906; Referees: Olesen, Peders (DEN)

2 August 2012; 16:15	Great Britain	21–32	Argentina	Copper Box, London; Attendance: 4,581; Referees: Coulibaly, Diabate (CIV)
2 August 2012; 16:15	Larsson 6	(11–16)	Simonet 6	Copper Box, London; Attendance: 4,581; Referees: Coulibaly, Diabate (CIV)
2 August 2012; 16:15	4× (yellow card) 4× (suspension)	Report	3× (yellow card) 3× (suspension)	Copper Box, London; Attendance: 4,581; Referees: Coulibaly, Diabate (CIV)

4 August 2012; 14:30	Sweden	29 – 13	Argentina	Copper Box, London; Attendance: 4,592; Referees: López, Sabroso (ESP)
4 August 2012; 14:30	Ekberg 9	(12–8)	Simonet 3	Copper Box, London; Attendance: 4,592; Referees: López, Sabroso (ESP)
4 August 2012; 14:30	4× (yellow card) 1× (suspension)	Report	3× (yellow card) 2× (suspension)	Copper Box, London; Attendance: 4,592; Referees: López, Sabroso (ESP)

6 August 2012; 11:15	Argentina	23 – 25	Tunisia	Copper Box, London; Attendance: 4,645; Referees: Olesen, Pedersen (DEN)
6 August 2012; 11:15	Simonet 6	(12–12)	Alouini 7	Copper Box, London; Attendance: 4,645; Referees: Olesen, Pedersen (DEN)
6 August 2012; 11:15	2× (yellow card) 7× (suspension) 1× (red card)	Report	3× (yellow card) 6× (suspension) 1× (red card)	Copper Box, London; Attendance: 4,645; Referees: Olesen, Pedersen (DEN)

== Judo ==
Athlete	Event	Round of 64	Round of 32	Round of 16	Quarterfinals	Semifinals	Repechage	Final / BM	
Athlete	Event	Opposition Result	Opposition Result	Opposition Result	Opposition Result	Opposition Result	Opposition Result	Opposition Result	Rank
Emmanuel Lucenti	Men's −81 kg	Bye	Ratsimiziva (MAD); W 0100–0001	Schmitt (FRA); W 0100–0000	Kim J-b (KOR); L 0003–0010	Did not advance	Valois-Fortier (CAN); L 0001–0101	Did not advance	7
Héctor Campos	Men's −90 kg	—N/a	González (CUB); L 0000–1000	did not advance					
Cristian Schmidt	Men's −100 kg	—N/a	Biadulin (BLR); L 0000–1001	did not advance					
Paula Pareto	Women's −48 kg	—N/a	Bye	Moretti (ITA); W 0001–0000	Fukumi (JPN); L 0001–0002	Did not advance	Munkhbat (MGL); W 0011–0002	Van Snick (BEL); L 0002–0011	5

== Rowing ==
Argentina qualified the following boats.

Men

Athlete	Event	Heats		Repechage		Quarterfinals		Semifinals		Final	
Athlete	Event	Time	Rank	Time	Rank	Time	Rank	Time	Rank	Time	Rank
Santiago Fernández	Single sculls	6:46.03	2 QF	Bye		7:01.57	2 SA/B	7:29.68	4 FB	7:20.40	10
Cristian Rosso; Ariel Suárez	Double sculls	6:13.68	3 SA/B	Bye		—N/a		6:19.40	1 FA	6:36.36	4
Mario Cejas; Miguel Mayol	Lightweight double sculls	7:01.76	5 R	6:48.21	5 SC/D	—N/a		7:06.24	2 FC	6:53.71	17

Women

Athlete	Event	Heats		Repechage		Quarterfinals		Semifinals		Final	
Athlete	Event	Time	Rank	Time	Rank	Time	Rank	Time	Rank	Time	Rank
Lucía Palermo	Single sculls	8:07.89	5 R	7:52.49	2 QF	8:06.47	5 SC/D	8:09.85	4 FD	8:40.38	21
María Laura Abalo; María Gabriela Best	Pair	7:12.17	5 R	7:20.94	6 FB	—N/a				8:03.53	9
Milka Kraljev; Clara Rohner	Lightweight double sculls	7:33.37	5 R	7:40.72	5 FC	—N/a		Bye		7:44.62	15

Qualification Legend: FA=Final A (medal); FB=Final B (non-medal); FC=Final C (non-medal); FD=Final D (non-medal); FE=Final E (non-medal); FF=Final F (non-medal); SA/B=Semifinals A/B; SC/D=Semifinals C/D; SE/F=Semifinals E/F; QF=Quarterfinals; R=Repechage

== Sailing ==
Argentina qualified 1 boat for each of the following events.

Men

Athlete	Event	Race											Net points	Final rank
Athlete	Event	1	2	3	4	5	6	7	8	9	10	M*	Net points	Final rank
Mariano Reutemann	RS:X	16	15	15	13	12	19	5	~~20~~	14	7	EL	116	11
Julio Alsogaray	Laser	20	7	5	11	12	23	1	~~50~~	26	7	EL	112	11
Lucas Calabrese; Juan de la Fuente	470	5	~~24~~	3	9	17	8	2	2	5	6	3	63	3rd place, bronze medalist(s)

Women

Athlete	Event	Race											Net points	Final rank
Athlete	Event	1	2	3	4	5	6	7	8	9	10	M*	Net points	Final rank
Jazmín López Becker	RS:X	20	19	20	24	21	19	~~25~~	17	25	25	EL	190	23
Cecilia Carranza Saroli	Laser Radial	9	28	13	28	10	30	12	~~35~~	20	35	EL	185	21
Consuelo Monsegur; María Fernanda Sesto	470	16	~~19~~	19	3	5	12	14	12	15	3	EL	98	13

M = Medal race; EL = Eliminated – did not advance into the medal race;

== Shooting ==
Two athletes qualified for shooting for the Argentine team.

Men

Athlete	Event	Qualification		Final	
Athlete	Event	Points	Rank	Points	Rank
Juan Angeloni	50 m rifle prone	580	50	did not advance	
Alex Suligoy	50 m rifle prone	593	20	did not advance	

== Swimming ==
Argentine swimmers achieved qualifying standards in the following events (up to a maximum of 2 swimmers in each event at the Olympic Qualifying Time (OQT), and potentially 1 at the Olympic Selection Time (OST)):

Men

Athlete	Event	Heat		Semifinal		Final	
Athlete	Event	Time	Rank	Time	Rank	Time	Rank
Federico Grabich	50 m freestyle	23.30	35	did not advance			
Federico Grabich	100 m backstroke	56.56	41	did not advance			
Juan Martín Pereyra	400 m freestyle	3:56.76	23	—N/a		did not advance	
Juan Martín Pereyra	1500 m freestyle	15:36.72	29	—N/a		did not advance	

Women

Athlete	Event	Heat		Final	
Athlete	Event	Time	Rank	Time	Rank
Georgina Bardach	400 m individual medley	4:57.31	34	did not advance	
Cecilia Biagioli	800 m freestyle	8:33.97 NR	16	did not advance	
Cecilia Biagioli	10 km open water	—N/a		2:01:02.2	17

== Synchronized swimming ==
Argentina qualified 1 duet in synchronized swimming.

Athlete	Event	Technical routine		Free routine (preliminary)			Free routine (final)		
Athlete	Event	Points	Rank	Points	Total (technical + free)	Rank	Points	Total (technical + free)	Rank
Etel Sánchez; Sofía Sánchez	Duet	78.900	22	78.410	157.310	22	did not advance		

== Table tennis ==
Argentina qualified one table tennis player.

Athlete	Event	Preliminary round	Round 1	Round 2	Round 3	Round 4	Quarterfinals	Semifinals	Final / BM	
Athlete	Event	Opposition Result	Opposition Result	Opposition Result	Opposition Result	Opposition Result	Opposition Result	Opposition Result	Opposition Result	Rank
Liu Song	Men's singles	Bye	Saka (CGO); W 4–0	Tokič (SLO); L 3–4	did not advance					

== Taekwondo ==
Argentina qualified one man and one woman.

Athlete	Event	Round of 16	Quarterfinals	Semifinals	Repechage	Bronze Medal	Final	
Athlete	Event	Opposition Result	Opposition Result	Opposition Result	Opposition Result	Opposition Result	Opposition Result	Rank
Sebastián Crismanich	Men's −80 kg	Scott (NZL); W 9–5	Bahave (AFG); W 9–1	Yeremyan (ARM); W 2–1	Bye		García (ESP); W 1–0	1st place, gold medalist(s)
Carola López	Women's −49 kg	Atabrour (MAR); W 1–0 SDP	Zaninovic (CRO); L 4–13	did not advance				

== Tennis ==
Argentina qualified seven players.

Men

Athlete	Event	Round of 64	Round of 32	Round of 16	Quarterfinals	Semifinals	Final / BM	
Athlete	Event	Opposition Score	Opposition Score	Opposition Score	Opposition Score	Opposition Score	Opposition Score	Rank
Carlos Berlocq	Singles	Bogomolov, Jr. (RUS); L 5–7, 6–7^{(5–7)}	did not advance					
Juan Martín del Potro	Singles	Dodig (CRO); W 6–4, 6–1	Seppi (ITA); W 6–3, 7–6^{(7–2)}	Simon (FRA); W 6–1, 4–6, 6–3	Nishikori (JPN); W 6–4, 7–6^{(7–4)}	Federer (SUI); L 6–4, 6–7^{(5–7)}, 17–19	Djokovic (SRB); W 7–5, 6–4	3rd place, bronze medalist(s)
Juan Mónaco	Singles	Goffin (BEL); W 6–4, 6–1	López (ESP); L 6–4, 6–4	did not advance				
David Nalbandian	Singles	Tipsarević (SRB); L 3–6, 4–6	did not advance					
David Nalbandian; Eduardo Schwank	Doubles	—N/a	Llodra / Tsonga (FRA); L 3–6, 5–7	did not advance				

Women

Athlete	Event	Round of 32	Round of 16	Quarterfinals	Semifinals	Final / BM	
Athlete	Event	Opposition Score	Opposition Score	Opposition Score	Opposition Score	Opposition Score	Rank
Gisela Dulko; Paola Suárez	Doubles	Li / Zhang (CHN); L 4–6, 2–6	did not advance				

Mixed

Athlete	Event	Round of 16	Quarterfinals	Semifinals	Final / BM	
Athlete	Event	Opposition Score	Opposition Score	Opposition Score	Opposition Score	Rank
Juan Martín del Potro; Gisela Dulko	Doubles	Vesnina / Youzhny (RUS); W 6–3, 7–5	Raymond / Bryan (USA); L 2–6, 5–7	did not advance		

== Triathlon ==
Athlete	Event	Swim (1.5 km)	Trans 1	Bike (40 km)	Trans 2	Run (10 km)	Total Time	Rank
Gonzalo Tellechea	Men's	18:59	0:38	58:48	0:31	32:11	1:51:07	38

== Volleyball ==
=== Beach ===
Athlete	Event	Preliminary round	Standing	Round of 16	Quarterfinals	Semifinals	Final	
Athlete	Event	Opposition Score	Standing	Opposition Score	Opposition Score	Opposition Score	Opposition Score	Rank
Ana Gallay; Virginia Zonta	Women's	Pool D Kessy – Ross (USA); L 0 – 2 (11–21 18–21); Baquerizo – Fernández (ESP); L 0 – 2 (20–22, 16–21); Keizer – van Iersel (NED); L 0 – 2 (12–21 16–21)	4	did not advance				19

=== Indoor ===
Argentina qualified a team to the men's indoor tournament and a team to the women's beach tournament.

- Men's indoor event – 1 team of 12 players

==== Men's indoor tournament ====
Team roster

The following is the Argentine roster in the men's volleyball tournament of the 2012 Summer Olympics.

Head coach: Javier Weber

№	Name	Date of birth	Height	Weight	Spike	Block	2012 club
1	Gabriel Arroyo	3 March 1977	1.94 m (6 ft 4 in)	95 kg (209 lb)	352 cm (139 in)	327 cm (129 in)	(Argentina) Club Ciudad de Bolívar
2	Ivan Castellani	19 January 1991	1.96 m (6 ft 5 in)	82 kg (181 lb)	336 cm (132 in)	320 cm (130 in)	(Argentina) PSM Voley
5	Nicolás Uriarte	21 March 1990	1.92 m (6 ft 4 in)	82 kg (181 lb)	346 cm (136 in)	326 cm (128 in)	(Argentina) Buenos Aires Unidos
6	Cristian Poglajen	14 July 1989	1.95 m (6 ft 5 in)	93 kg (205 lb)	346 cm (136 in)	320 cm (130 in)	(Argentina) Sarmiento Voley
7	Facundo Conte	25 August 1989	1.98 m (6 ft 6 in)	90 kg (200 lb)	350 cm (140 in)	326 cm (128 in)	(Russia) Dynamo Krasnodar
9	Rodrigo Quiroga (c)	23 March 1987	1.90 m (6 ft 3 in)	87 kg (192 lb)	345 cm (136 in)	321 cm (126 in)	(Brazil) Vivo-Minas
10	Nicolas Bruno	24 February 1989	1.88 m (6 ft 2 in)	84 kg (185 lb)	338 cm (133 in)	308 cm (121 in)	(Argentina) Buenos Aires Unidos
11	Sebastian Solé	12 June 1991	2.02 m (6 ft 8 in)	88 kg (194 lb)	350 cm (140 in)	328 cm (129 in)	(Argentina) Club Ciudad de Bolívar
12	Federico Pereyra	19 June 1988	2.00 m (6 ft 7 in)	99 kg (218 lb)	335 cm (132 in)	325 cm (128 in)	(Argentina) Club La Unión
14	Pablo Crer	12 June 1989	2.05 m (6 ft 9 in)	78 kg (172 lb)	350 cm (140 in)	330 cm (130 in)	(Argentina) Club Ciudad de Bolívar
15	Luciano De Cecco	2 June 1988	1.93 m (6 ft 4 in)	89 kg (196 lb)	333 cm (131 in)	315 cm (124 in)	(Italy) Copra Volley
16	Alexis González (L)	21 July 1981	1.84 m (6 ft 0 in)	83 kg (183 lb)	321 cm (126 in)	300 cm (120 in)	(Argentina) Club Ciudad de Bolívar

Group play

Pos	Team	Pld	W	L	Pts	SW	SL	SR	SPW	SPL	SPR
1	Bulgaria	5	4	1	12	13	4	3.250	407	390	1.044
2	Poland	5	3	2	9	11	7	1.571	433	374	1.158
3	Argentina	5	3	2	9	10	7	1.429	382	367	1.041
4	Italy	5	3	2	8	10	9	1.111	426	413	1.031
5	Australia	5	2	3	7	8	10	0.800	395	397	0.995
6	Great Britain	5	0	5	0	0	15	0.000	274	376	0.729

29 July 2012; 14:45	Australia	0–3	Argentina	Earls Court Exhibition Centre, London; Attendance: 11,500; Referees: Nasr Shaaban (EGY), Susana Rodriguez (ESP)
29 July 2012; 14:45	(21–25, 22–25, 20–25); Results Statistics			Earls Court Exhibition Centre, London; Attendance: 11,500; Referees: Nasr Shaaban (EGY), Susana Rodriguez (ESP)

31 July 2012; 14:45	Italy	3–1	Argentina	Earls Court Exhibition Centre, London; Attendance: 12,500; Referees: Ibrahim Al-Naama (QAT), Frans Loderus (NED)
31 July 2012; 14:45	(25–17, 21–25, 25–17, 25–23); Results Statistics			Earls Court Exhibition Centre, London; Attendance: 12,500; Referees: Ibrahim Al-Naama (QAT), Frans Loderus (NED)

2 August 2012; 16:45	Poland	3–0	Argentina	Earls Court Exhibition Centre, London; Attendance: 13,000; Referees: Georgios Karampetsos (GRE), Ibrahim Al-Naama (QAT)
2 August 2012; 16:45	(25–18, 25–20, 25–16); Results Statistics			Earls Court Exhibition Centre, London; Attendance: 13,000; Referees: Georgios Karampetsos (GRE), Ibrahim Al-Naama (QAT)

4 August 2012; 20:30	Argentina	3–1	Bulgaria	Earls Court Exhibition Centre, London; Attendance: 14,500; Referees: Frans Loderus (NED), Akihiko Tano (JPN)
4 August 2012; 20:30	(25–18, 21–25, 25–19, 25–20); Results Statistics			Earls Court Exhibition Centre, London; Attendance: 14,500; Referees: Frans Loderus (NED), Akihiko Tano (JPN)

6 August 2012; 16:45	Great Britain	0–3	Argentina	Earls Court Exhibition Centre, London; Attendance: 13,750; Referees: Denny Cespedes (DOM), Zorica Bjelić (SRB)
6 August 2012; 16:45	(18–25, 18–25, 15–25); Results Statistics			Earls Court Exhibition Centre, London; Attendance: 13,750; Referees: Denny Cespedes (DOM), Zorica Bjelić (SRB)

Quarter-final

8 August 2012; 14:00	Argentina	0–3	Brazil	Earls Court Exhibition Centre, London; Attendance: 11,500; Referees: Andrey Zenovich (RUS), Simone Santi (ITA)
8 August 2012; 14:00	(19–25, 17–25, 20–25); Results Statistics			Earls Court Exhibition Centre, London; Attendance: 11,500; Referees: Andrey Zenovich (RUS), Simone Santi (ITA)

== Wrestling ==
Argentina qualified in the following events.

Key:

- VT - Victory by Fall.
- PP - Decision by Points – the loser with technical points.
- PO - Decision by Points – the loser without technical points.

Women's freestyle

Athlete	Event	Qualification	Round of 16	Quarterfinal	Semifinal	Repechage 1	Repechage 2	Final / BM	
Athlete	Event	Opposition Result	Opposition Result	Opposition Result	Opposition Result	Opposition Result	Opposition Result	Opposition Result	Rank
Patricia Bermúdez	−48 kg	Matkowska (POL); L 0–3 ^{PO}	did not advance						17

== See also ==
- Argentina at the 2011 Pan American Games
- Argentina at the 2012 Winter Youth Olympics
