= Carolena Carstens =

Panamanian taekwondo practitioner

Personal information
- Born: Carolena Jean Carstens Salceda; January 18, 1996 (age 30) Winfield, Illinois, US
- Height: 1.68 m (5 ft 6 in)
- Weight: 57 Kg

Sport
- Country: Panama
- Sport: Taekwondo
- Event: -57 Kg
Medal record
Representing Panama
Pan American Games
Bronze medal – third place	2023 Santiago	57 kg
Bolivarian Games
Gold medal – first place	2017 Santa Marta	57 kg
Gold medal – first place	2022 Valledupar	57 kg
Grand Prix
Bronze medal – third place	2017 Moscow	57 kg
- Updated on 15 August 2017

Carolena Jean Carstens Salceda (born January 18, 1996, in Winfield, Illinois, United States) is a taekwondo practitioner representing Panama. She has dual US / Panamanian citizenship through her father and mother respectively,. She used to live in Glen Ellyn, Illinois., but has since moved to Spain.

In 2011, Carstens participated at the Pan American Championships, where she won the silver medal in the youth -52 kg category, losing to the American Deireanne Morales in the final. She subsequently took part in qualification for the 2012 Summer Olympics in November 2011, finishing fourth. She later received one of four wild card entries for the Olympics as the 13th ranked athlete in the -49 kg category, becoming the first Olympic taekwondo athlete from Panama, and the second youngest Olympian in the country's history. She was the youngest athlete at the 2012 Olympics. She lost her first contest 7–2 to an eventual finalist, Spaniard Brigitte Yagüe, and then lost her repechage fight to Mexican Jannet Alegría by the same score.

She competed for Panama at the 2016 Summer Olympics, and was defeated by Raheleh Asemani of Belgium in the first round. She was the flag bearer for Panama during the closing ceremony.

She competed in the women's lightweight event at the 2022 World Taekwondo Championships held in Guadalajara, Mexico.
