= Sanaa Atabrour =

Moroccan taekwondo practitioner

Personal information
- Born: 28 February 1989 (age 37) Khouribga, Morocco
- Height: 1.58 m (5 ft 2 in)

Sport
- Country: Morocco
- Sport: Taekwondo
- Event: Flyweight (-49 kg)
- Club: Sharjah Taekwondo Club
- Turned pro: 2009
- Coached by: Mohamed Siraj

Achievements and titles
- Highest world ranking: 2nd
Medal record
Women's taekwondo
Representing Morocco
World Championships
Bronze medal – third place	2011 Gyeongju	Flyweight
African Olympic Qualification
Gold medal – first place	2011 Cairo	49 kg
African Championships
Silver medal – second place	2016 Port Said	Flyweight

Sanaa Atabrour (born 28 February 1989, in Khouribga) is a Moroccan taekwondo practitioner.

== Career ==
Sanaa won the bronze medal in the women's flyweight class at the 2011 World Taekwondo Championships held in Gyeongju. Sanaa qualified for the 2012 Summer Olympics after winning the gold medal in the women's 49 kg class at the WTF African Qualification Tournament for the 2012 London Olympic Games held in Cairo. She beat Catherine Kang 4–0 in the final. In 2012 she competed in the Women's 49 kg competition, but was defeated in the first round.
