= Catherine Seulki Kang =

Korean Central African taekwondoin (born 1987)

Personal information
- Full name: Catherine Seulki Kang
- Nationality: South Korea; Central African Republic
- Born: Seulki Kang; 25 September 1987 (age 38) Gunsan, Jeonbuk, South Korea
- Height: 170 cm (5 ft 7 in)
- Weight: 49 kg (108 lb)

Korean name
- Hangul: 강슬기
- RR: Gang Seulgi
- MR: Kang Sŭlgi

Sport
- Country: Central African Republic
- Sport: Taekwondo
- Event: Women's 49 kg
Medal record
Women's taekwondo
Representing Central African Republic
WU Taekwondo Championship
Bronze medal – third place	2012 Pocheon
- Updated on 10 Aug 2012

Catherine Seulki Kang (born 25 September 1987) is a South Korean-born Central African taekwondo practitioner. She competed at the 2012 Summer Olympics in the Women's 49 kg event. On 8 August, she was defeated in the preliminary round against Lucija Zaninović of Croatia.

== Personal life ==
Kang was born in Gunsan, Jeonbuk province and resides at Busan in South Korea. She graduated from Gyeonggi Science High School and Woosuk University.

== Career ==
While working as Taekwondo instructor in Belgium, Kang decided to switch nationality in 2010 to Central African Republic to try to qualify for the 2012 Summer Olympic Games.

In 2012, Kang become the first taekwondo athlete to win a medal while representing Central African Republic in an international event. She won the bronze medal in the WU Taekwondo Championship 2012 which was held in her native country South Korea at Pocheon.

Kang also works as a Taekwondo coach for the Antioquia team competing in La Liga Antioqueña de Taekwondo at Medellín, Colombia.
