= Raya Hatahet =

Jordanian taekwondo practitioner

Raya Hatahet (born 26 December 1989 in Amman) is a Jordanian taekwondo martial artist. At the 2012 Summer Olympics, she competed as an injury replacement in the Women's 49 kg competition, but was eliminated in the first round by Mexican Jannet Alegría, by a score of 12–1.
