= Carola López =

Argentine taekwondo practitioner

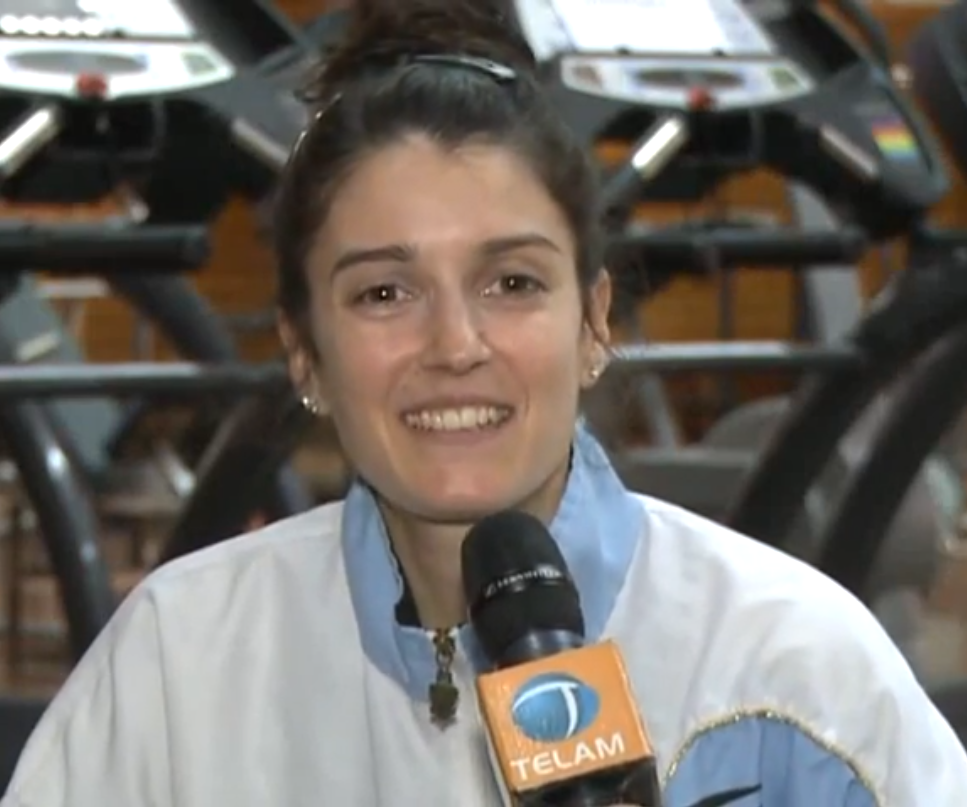
- In a 2012 interview
- Born: Carola Malvina López; 17 April 1982 (age 43)
- Occupation: Taekwondo practitioner

Carola Malvina López (born 17 April 1982) is an Argentine taekwondo practitioner. At the 2012 Summer Olympics, she competed in the Women's 49kg competition, but was defeated in the quarter-finals.
