= Lucija Zaninović =

Croatian taekwondo practitioner

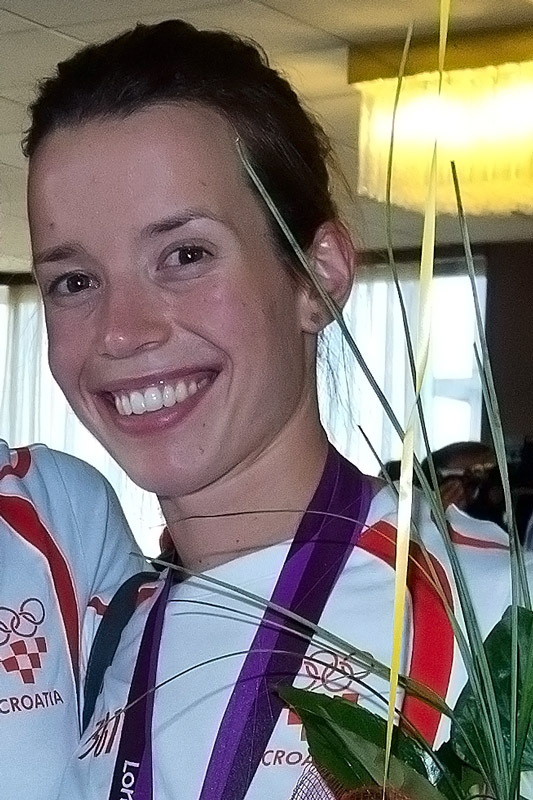

Personal information
- Born: 26 June 1987 (age 39) Split, SR Croatia, SFR Yugoslavia
- Height: 1.70 m (5 ft 7 in)

Sport
- Country: Croatia
- Sport: Taekwondo
- Event: Flyweight (-49 kg)
- Club: Marjan Taekwondo Club
- Coached by: Toni Tomas
Medal record
Representing Croatia
Women's taekwondo
Olympic Games
Bronze medal – third place	2012 London	49 kg
World Championships
Bronze medal – third place	2013 Puebla	Flyweight
European Championships
Gold medal – first place	2010 Saint Petersburg	Flyweight
Gold medal – first place	2012 Manchester	Flyweight
Gold medal – first place	2014 Baku	Flyweight
Bronze medal – third place	2016 Montreux	Flyweight
European Games
Bronze medal – third place	2015 Baku	49 kg
Universiade
Silver medal – second place	2015 Gwangju	Flyweight

Lucija Zaninović (born 26 June 1987, in Split) is a Croatian taekwondo practitioner. She is the twin sister of taekwondo practitioner Ana Zaninović.

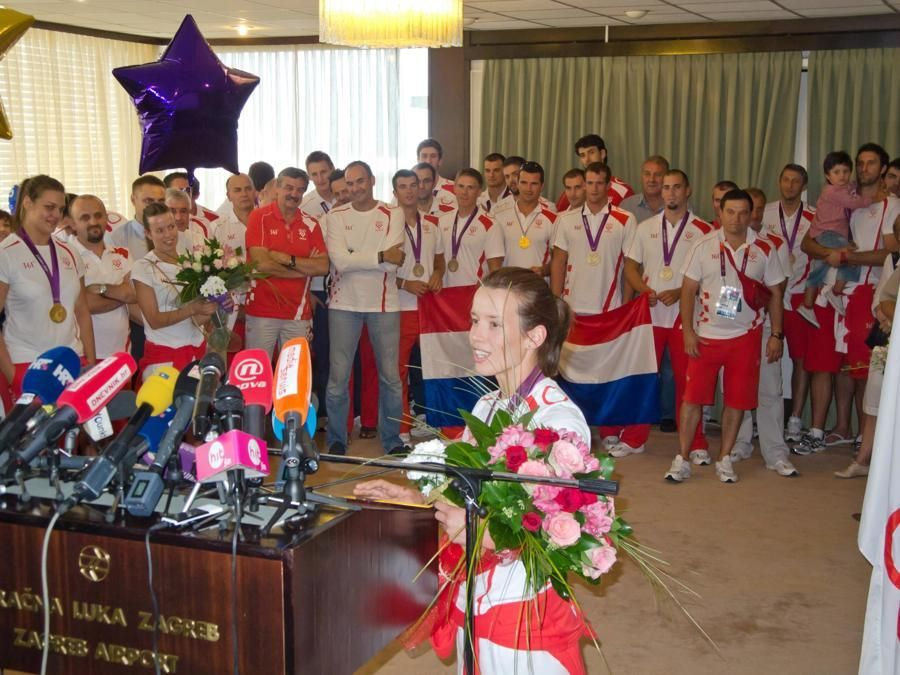
Lucija Zaninović 2012

Zaninović won the gold medal in the women's flyweight class at the 2010 European Taekwondo Championships held in Saint Petersburg. Zaninović qualified for the 2012 Summer Olympics after winning the silver medal in the women's 49 kg class at the 2011 World Taekwondo Olympic Qualification Tournament held in Baku. She withdrew in the final match against Olympic champion Wu Jingyu and was the only European to qualify through the Qualification Tournament. In 2012, she defended the European title in the women's flyweight class after defeating Kristina Kim at the 2012 European Taekwondo Championships held in Manchester. At the 2012 Summer Olympics, she defeated Seulki Kang and Carola Malvina López before losing to Wu Jingyu in the semi-finals. She won the bronze medal after defeating Jannet Alegría in the sudden death round of the bronze medal match. This was the third medal for Croatia at the Olympics in taekwondo, after Martina Zubčić and Sandra Šarić who also won the bronze four years before in Beijing.

== See also ==
- List of Olympic medalists in taekwondo
