= Elizabeth Zamora =

Guatemalan taekwondo practitioner

Personal information
- Full name: Elizabeth Zamora Gordillo
- Nationality: Guatemala
- Born: 11 May 1993 (age 33) Guatemala City, Guatemala
- Height: 165 cm (5.41 ft)
- Weight: 49 kg (108 lb)

Sport
- Sport: Taekwondo
Medal record
Women's taekwondo
Representing Guatemala
Central American and Caribbean Games
Gold medal – first place	2010 Mayagüez	Under 49 kg
Bronze medal – third place	2014 Veracruz	Under 49 kg
- Updated on 22 November 2014

Elizabeth Zamora Gordillo (born 11 May 1993 in Guatemala City) is a Guatemalan taekwondo practitioner. At the 2012 Summer Olympics, she competed in the Women's 49kg competition, but was defeated by Thai opponent Chanatip Sonkham in the bronze medal Repechage match.
