= Aminata Traoré (taekwondo) =

Ivorian taekwondo practitioner (born 1999)

Personal information
- Full name: Aminata Charlène Traoré
- Nationality: Ivorian
- Born: 25 February 1999 (age 27)

Sport
- Country: Ivory Coast
- Sport: Taekwondo
- Event: +67 kg

Aminata Traoré (born 25 February 1999) is an Ivorian taekwondo practitioner.

== Career ==
She competed at the 2017 and 2018 World Championships. She came third at the 2018 African Championship and third at the 2019 African Games. She won the 2021 African Championships in Dakar. She was selected for the Taekwondo at the 2020 Summer Olympics – Women's +67 kg.
