= Julissa Diez Canseco =

Peruvian taekwondo athlete

Julissa Diez
Personal information
- Nationality: Peruvian
- Born: 5 June 1989 (age 37) Lima, Peru

Sport
- Sport: Taekwondo
Medal record
Representing Peru
Pan American Games
Silver medal – second place	2011 Guadalajara	49 kg

Julissa Diez Canseco (born 5 June 1989) is a Peruvian taekwondo athlete.

She represented Peru at the 2016 Summer Olympics in Rio de Janeiro, in the women's 49 kg.
