= Jannet Alegría =

Mexican taekwondo practitioner

Personal information
- Born: August 30, 1987 (age 38) San Juan del Río, Mexico
- Height: 1.54 m (5 ft 1/2 in)

Sport
- Country: Mexico
- Sport: Taekwondo
- Event: -49 Kg
Medal record
Pan American Games
Bronze medal – third place	2011 Guadalajara	-49 kg
- Updated on 26 July 2012

Jannet Alegría Peña (born August 30, 1987, in San Juan del Río, Mexico) is a Mexican taekwondo practitioner.

In 2011, she participated at the 2011 Pan American Games where she won the bronze medal at the -49 kg category. Later in 2012 she qualified directly to participate at the 2012 Summer Olympics, making her Olympic debut. She beat Raya Hatahet in her first match, before losing to Brigitte Yagüe in the quarter-final. In the repechage, she beat Carolena Carstens, before losing her bronze medal match to Lucija Zaninović in sudden death overtime.
