= Erika Kasahara =

Japanese taekwondo practitioner

Medal record

Women's taekwondo

Representing Japan

Asian Games
Silver medal – second place	2010 Guangzhou	Flyweight

Asian Championships
Silver medal – second place	2010 Astana	Flyweight

East Asian Games
Bronze medal – third place	2009 Hong Kong	Flyweight

Erika Kasahara (笠原 江梨香, Kasahara Erika; born October 3, 1990) is a female Japanese taekwondo practitioner, born in Daito. She won the silver medal in the women's flyweight (-49 kg) class at the 2010 Asian Taekwondo Championships held in Astana, Kazakhstan.

She competed in the 2012 Summer Olympics, reaching the quarterfinals, where she lost to eventual gold medallist Wu Jingyu.

== Personal life ==
Kasahara was originally a karateka but converted her specialty to taekwondo in 2007. She currently attends at Daito Bunka University, majoring in English Literature.
