= Brigitte Yagüe =

Spanish taekwondo practitioner

Medal record

Representing Spain

Women's taekwondo

Olympic Games
Silver medal – second place	2012 London	49 kg

World Championships
Gold medal – first place	2003 Garmisch-Partenkirchen	Finweight
Gold medal – first place	2007 Beijing	Flyweight
Gold medal – first place	2009 Copenhagen	Flyweight
Silver medal – second place	2001 Jeju	Flyweight
Silver medal – second place	2005 Madrid	Flyweight
Bronze medal – third place	2011 Gyeongju	Flyweight

Brigitte Yagüe Enrique (born 15 March 1981 in Palma de Mallorca, Balearic Islands, Spain) is a taekwondo practitioner from Spain.

In 2004, Yagüe qualified for the Athens Olympics, winning over rival Belen Asensio in the –49 kg class at the Spanish Olympic Trials. There, she was eliminated in the first round of the women's 49kg competition by losing 5–9 to Yaowapa Boorapolchai of Thailand.

In May 2008, she was named to a member of the Spain national taekwondo team and competed in the European Olympic Qualification Tournament in Istanbul, and lost to Sumeyye Gulec of Germany 1–2 in the quarterfinals.

In 2012, she won the silver medal at the London Olympics in the women's 49kg competition. She lost the gold medal match by 1-8 to Wu Jingyu of China.

She is married to Juan Antonio Ramos, a two-time taekwondo world champion. Both won flyweight gold in 2007 at Beijing.

== See also ==
- List of Olympic medalists in taekwondo
