= 2011 Korea Grand Prix Gold =

Tournament details
- Dates: 6–11 December
- Level: Grand Prix Gold
- Total prize money: US$120,000
- Venue: Hanium Culture Sports Center
- Location: Hwasun, South Korea

Champions
- Men's singles: (South Korea) Lee Hyun-il
- Women's singles: (South Korea) Sung Ji-hyun
- Men's doubles: (South Korea) Ko Sung-hyun (South Korea) Yoo Yeon-seong
- Women's doubles: (South Korea) Eom Hye-won (South Korea) Jang Ye-na
- Mixed doubles: (South Korea) Yoo Yeon-seong (South Korea) Jang Ye-na

The 2011 Korea Grand Prix Gold was a badminton tournament which took place at Hanium Culture Sports Center in Hwasun, South Korea from 6 to 11 December 2011 and had a total purse of $120,000. This is for the first time this tournament was graded as a Grand Prix Gold event, where before rate as Grand Prix event. This tournament was part of the qualification stage of 2012 Summer Olympics.

== Men's singles ==
=== Seeds ===
1. (China) Chen Jin (semi-finals)
2. (Indonesia) Simon Santoso (withdrew)
3. (South Korea) Lee Hyun-il (champion)
4. (China) Wang Zhengming (third round)
5. (Indonesia) Tommy Sugiarto (quarter-finals)
6. (South Korea) Shon Wan-ho (final)
7. (Indonesia) Dionysius Hayom Rumbaka (second round)
8. (Thailand) Tanongsak Saensomboonsuk (withdrew)
9. (Chinese Taipei) Hsu Jen-hao (third round)
10. (Malaysia) Muhammad Hafiz Hashim (withdrew)
11. (Singapore) Derek Wong (first round)
12. (Malaysia) Liew Daren (quarter-finals)
13. (Malaysia) Mohamad Arif Abdul Latif (semi-finals)
14. (Indonesia) Sony Dwi Kuncoro (second round)
15. (Malaysia) Chong Wei Feng (quarter-finals)
16. (Malaysia) Chan Kwong Beng (third round)

=== Finals ===
Quarter-finals
1	(China) Chen Jin	13	21	21
15	(Malaysia) Chong Wei Feng	21	14	10
3	(South Korea) Lee Hyun-il	21	21
5	(Indonesia) Tommy Sugiarto	13	14
6	(South Korea) Shon Wan-ho	w	/	o
(South Korea) Hong Ji-hoon
12	(Malaysia) Liew Daren	16	9
13	(Malaysia) Mohamad Arif Abdul Latif	21	21

Semi-finals
1	(China) Chen Jin	17	21	18
3	(South Korea) Lee Hyun-il	21	13	21
6	(South Korea) Shon Wan-ho	21	21
13	(Malaysia) Mohamad Arif Abdul Latif	14	10

Final
3	(South Korea) Lee Hyun-il	21	21
6	(South Korea) Shon Wan-ho	18	16

== Women's singles ==
=== Seeds ===
1. (China) Jiang Yanjiao (quarter-finals)
2. (South Korea) Sung Ji-hyun (champion)
3. (South Korea) Bae Yeon-ju (second round)
4. (China) Liu Xin (semi-finals)
5. (China) Li Xuerui (semi-finals)
6. (Netherlands) Yao Jie (first round)
7. (Indonesia) Lindaweni Fanetri (withdrew)
8. (Ukraine) Larisa Griga (first round)

=== Finals ===
Semi-finals
5	(China) Li Xuerui	16	12
PFQ	(China) Han Li	21	21
4	(China) Liu Xin	20	21	17
2	(South Korea) Sung Ji-hyun	22	12	21

Final
PFQ	(China) Han Li	18	16
2	(South Korea) Sung Ji-hyun	21	21

== Men's doubles ==
=== Seeds ===
1. (South Korea) Jung Jae-sung / Lee Yong-dae (final)
2. (South Korea) Ko Sung-hyun / Yoo Yeon-seong (champions)
3. (China) Hong Wei / Shen Ye (semi-finals)
4. (Malaysia) Goh Wei Shem / Lim Khim Wah (first round)
5. (South Korea) Cho Gun-woo / Kim Ki-jung (quarter-finals)
6. (Chinese Taipei) Huang Po-yi / Lu Chia-bin (first round)
7. (Malaysia) Ow Yao Han / Tan Wee Kiong (first round)
8. (Austria) Jürgen Koch / Peter Zauner (second round)

=== Finals ===
Semi-finals
1	(South Korea) Jung Jae-sung (South Korea) Lee Yong-dae	21	21
3	(China) Hong Wei (China) Shen Ye	14	14
(South Korea) Kang Ji-wook (South Korea) Kim Sa-rang	19	18
2	(South Korea) Ko Sung-hyun (South Korea) Yoo Yeon-seong	21	21

Final
1	(South Korea) Jung Jae-sung (South Korea) Lee Yong-dae	15	22
2	(South Korea) Ko Sung-hyun (South Korea) Yoo Yeon-seong	21	24

== Women's doubles ==
=== Seeds ===
1. (South Korea) Ha Jung-eun / Kim Min-jung (withdrew)
2. (Indonesia) Meiliana Jauhari / Greysia Polii (withdrew)
3. (South Korea) Jung Kyung-eun / Kim Ha-na (second round)
4. (Singapore) Shinta Mulia Sari / Yao Lei (final)

=== Finals ===
Semi-finals
(Indonesia) Anneke Feinya Agustin (Indonesia) Nitya Krishinda Maheswari	19	21	19
4	(Singapore) Shinta Mulia Sari (Singapore) Yao Lei	21	16	21
(China) Tang Jinhua (China) Xia Huan	14	19
(South Korea) Eom Hye-won (South Korea) Jang Ye-na	21	21

Final
4	(Singapore) Shinta Mulia Sari (Singapore) Yao Lei	15	16
(South Korea) Eom Hye-won (South Korea) Jang Ye-na	21	21

== Mixed doubles ==
=== Seeds ===
1. (South Korea) Lee Yong-dae / Ha Jung-eun (withdrew)
2. (China) Robert Mateusiak / Nadieżda Zięba (withdrew)
3. (Canada) Toby Ng / Grace Gao (first round)
4. (Singapore) Danny Bawa Chrisnanta / Vanessa Neo (quarter-finals)
5. (South Korea) Ko Sung-hyun / Eom Hye-won (semi-finals)
6. (China) Hong Wei / Pan Pan (first round)
7. (South Korea) Kim Ki-jung / Jung Kyung-eun (final)
8. (Indonesia) Fran Kurniawan / Shendy Puspa Irawati (quarter-finals)

=== Finals ===
Semi-finals
(South Korea) Shin Baek-cheol (South Korea) Kim Ha-na	13	15
7	(South Korea) Kim Ki-jung (South Korea) Jung Kyung-eun	21	21
5	(South Korea) Ko Sung-hyun (South Korea) Eom Hye-won	12	13
(South Korea) Yoo Yeon-seong (South Korea) Jang Ye-na	21	21

Final
7	(South Korea) Kim Ki-jung (South Korea) Jung Kyung-eun	17	19
(South Korea) Yoo Yeon-seong (South Korea) Jang Ye-na	21	21
