= Badminton at the 2012 Summer Olympics – Qualification =

The Olympic qualification period was between 2 May 2011 and 29 April 2012, and the Badminton World Federation rankings list, published on 3 May 2012, was used to allocate spots. Nations can enter a total of three players. Three quota places if three players are ranked four or above, two if two players are ranked 16 or above and otherwise one quota place until the quota contingent of 38 is filled.

For each male player who qualifies in more than one discipline, an additional quota place in the Men's Singles becomes free. If no player from one continent can qualify, the best ranked player from this continent gets a quota place.

== Qualifying criteria ==
The main qualifying criterion was the BWF Ranking list as of May 3, 2012. It provided a total of 16 pairs in each doubles event and 38 athletes in each singles event, in the following manner:

- Rankings 1–4: Players/pairs were taken in turn unless a NOC had already qualified 3 players/pairs.
- Rankings 5–16: Players/pairs were taken in turn unless a NOC had already qualified 2 players/pairs.
- Rankings 17+: Players/pairs were taken in turn unless a NOC had already qualified 1 player/pair.

Each continent was guaranteed one entry in each event. If this was not satisfied by the entry selection method described above, the highest ranking player/pair was qualified. If there was no player/pair in the rankings, the winner of the most recently contested Continental Championship was qualified. A country could only advantage from this rule twice.

The host nation (Great Britain) was entitled to enter 2 players in total, but more than 2 players were permitted if they all qualified under qualifying regulations.

There were also 2 invitational places in each singles event which were allocated by the IOC Tripartite Commission, however the BWF decided to allocate wildcards to men only.

== Qualification summary ==
NOC	Men's Singles	Men's Doubles	Women's Singles	Women's Doubles	Mixed Doubles	Total	
NOC	Men's Singles	Men's Doubles	Women's Singles	Women's Doubles	Mixed Doubles	Quotas	Athletes
Australia		1	1	1		3	5
Austria	1		1			2	2
Belgium	1		1			2	2
Belarus			1			1	1
Bulgaria			1			1	1
Canada			1	1	1	3	4
China	3	2	3	2	2	12	17
Chinese Taipei	1	1	2	1	1	6	8
Czech Republic	1		1			2	2
Denmark	2	1	1	1	2	7	9
Egypt			1			1	1
Estonia	1					1	1
Finland	1		1			2	2
France	1		1			2	2
Germany	1	1	1		1	4	6
Great Britain	1		1		1	3	4
Guatemala	1					1	1
Hong Kong	1		1	1		3	4
Iceland			1			1	1
India	1		1	1	1	4	5
Indonesia	2	1	1	1	1	6	9
Ireland	1		1			2	2
Israel	1					1	1
Italy			1			1	1
Japan	2	1	1	2	1	7	11
Lithuania			1			1	1
Malaysia	1	1	1		1	4	6
Maldives	1					1	1
Mexico			1			1	1
Netherlands			1			1	1
Norway			1			1	1
Peru	1		1			2	2
Poland	1	1	1		1	4	6
Portugal	1		1			2	2
Russia	1	1	1	1	1	5	6
Singapore	1		1	1		3	4
Slovakia			1			1	1
Slovenia			1			1	1
South Africa		1		1		2	4
South Korea	2	2	2	2	1	9	12
Spain	1		1			2	2
Sri Lanka	1		1			2	2
Switzerland			1			1	1
Suriname	1					1	1
Sweden	1					1	1
Thailand	1	1	1		1	4	6
Turkey			1			1	1
Uganda	1					1	1
Ukraine	1		1			2	2
United States		1	1			2	3
Vietnam	1					1	1
Total: 57 NOCs	40	16	46	16	16	134	172

== Qualifiers ==
The color pink signifies that a player was withdrawn from the competition.

=== Men's singles ===
No.	Rank	Player	NOC	Note
1	1	Lee Chong Wei	Malaysia	Asia
2	2	Lin Dan	China	
3	3	Chen Long	China	
4	4	Chen Jin	China	
5	5	Peter Gade	Denmark	Europe
6	6	Sho Sasaki	Japan	
7	7	Lee Hyun-il	South Korea	
8	8	Kenichi Tago	Japan	
9	9	Simon Santoso	Indonesia	
10	11	Nguyễn Tiến Minh	Vietnam	
11	12	Taufik Hidayat	Indonesia	
12	13	Jan Ø. Jørgensen	Denmark	
13	14	Shon Wan-ho	South Korea	
14	15	Marc Zwiebler	Germany	
15	19	Rajiv Ouseph	Great Britain	
16	20	Wong Wing Ki	Hong Kong	
17	22	Pablo Abian	Spain	
18	24	Kashyap Parupalli	India	
19	25	Hsu Jen-hao	Chinese Taipei	
20	28	Boonsak Ponsana	Thailand	
21	29	Kevin Cordón	Guatemala	Pan America
22	34	Przemysław Wacha	Poland	
23	36	Brice Leverdez	France	
24	37	Ville Lang	Finland	
	40	Eric Pang	Netherlands	Europe
25	42	Derek Wong	Singapore	
26	43	Henri Hurskainen	Sweden	
27	45	Vladimir Ivanov	Russia	
28	46	Dmytro Zavadsky	Ukraine	
29	47	Niluka Karunaratne	Sri Lanka	
30	50	Yuhan Tan	Belgium	
31	59	Pedro Martins	Portugal	
32	60	Michael Lahnsteiner	Austria	
33	64	Misha Zilberman	Israel	
34	65	Rodrigo Pacheco	Peru	Re-distributed doubles quota
35	66	Raul Must	Estonia	Re-distributed doubles quota
36	67	Scott Evans	Ireland	Re-distributed unused quota
37	70	Petr Koukal	Czech Republic	Re-distributed unused quota
38	98	Edwin Ekiring	Uganda	Africa
	121	James Eunson	New Zealand	Oceania
39	221	Virgil Soeroredjo	Suriname	Tripartite invitation
40	226	Mohamed Ajfan Rasheed	Maldives	Tripartite invitation

=== Women's singles ===
No.	Rank	Player	NOC	Note
1	1	Wang Yihan	China	Asia
2	2	Wang Xin	China	
	3	Wang Shixian	China	
3	4	Li Xuerui	China	Re-distributed unused quota
4	5	Saina Nehwal	India	
5	7	Tine Baun	Denmark	Europe
6	8	Juliane Schenk	Germany	
7	9	Cheng Shao-chieh	Chinese Taipei	
8	10	Sung Ji-hyun	South Korea	
9	11	Ratchanok Intanon	Thailand	
10	12	Tai Tzu-ying	Chinese Taipei	
11	13	Bae Youn-joo	South Korea	
12	15	Sayaka Sato	Japan	
13	16	Gu Juan	Singapore	
14	18	Yao Jie	Netherlands	
15	20	Petya Nedelcheva	Bulgaria	
16	21	Pi Hongyan	France	
17	22	Michelle Li	Canada	Pan America
18	23	Yip Pui Yin	Hong Kong	
19	27	Carolina Marín	Spain	
20	33	Agnese Allegrini	Italy	
	34	Maria Febe Kusumastuti	Indonesia	
21	36	Susan Egelstaff	Great Britain	
22	37	Neslihan Yiğit	Turkey	
23	39	Anastasia Prokopenko	Russia	
24	40	Adrianti Firdasari	Indonesia	Re-distributed unused quota
	41	Jeanine Cicognini	Switzerland	
25	44	Chloe Magee	Ireland	
26	45	Larisa Griga	Ukraine	
	46	Michelle Chan Kit Ying	New Zealand	Oceania
27	47	Kristina Gavnholt	Czech Republic	
28	55	Lianne Tan	Belgium	
29	57	Rena Wang	United States	
30	59	Tee Jing Yi	Malaysia	
	65	Anne Hald Jensen	Greece	
31	68	Victoria Montero	Mexico	
32	69	Sabrina Jaquet	Switzerland	Re-distributed unused quota
33	70	Anu Nieminen	Finland	
34	71	Telma Santos	Portugal	
35	72	Ragna Ingolfsdottir	Iceland	
36	75	Victoria Na	Australia	Re-distributed doubles quota
37	76	Kamila Augustyn	Poland	Re-distributed doubles quota
	80	Claudia Mayer	Austria	Re-distributed doubles quota
38	84	Simone Prutsch	Austria	Re-distributed unused quota
39	87	Maja Tvrdy	Slovenia	Re-distributed doubles quota
40	89	Akvile Stapusaityte	Lithuania	Re-distributed doubles quota
41	90	Claudia Rivero	Peru	Re-distributed doubles quota
42	99	Monika Fasungova	Slovakia	Re-distributed doubles quota
43	101	Alesia Zaitsava	Belarus	Re-distributed doubles quota
44	102	Hadia Hosny	Egypt	Africa
	103	Kerry-Lee Harrington	South Africa	Re-distributed unused quota
45	105	Sara Blengsli Kværnø	Norway	Re-distributed unused quota
46	109	Thilini Jayasinghe	Sri Lanka	Re-distributed unused quota

=== Men's doubles ===
No.	Rank	Players		NOC	Note
1	1	Cai Yun	Fu Haifeng	China	Asia
2	2	Jung Jae-sung	Lee Yong-dae	South Korea	
3	3	Mathias Boe	Carsten Mogensen	Denmark	Europe
4	4	Ko Sung-hyun	Yoo Yeon-seong	South Korea	
5	5	Chai Biao	Guo Zhendong	China	
6	6	Mohammad Ahsan	Bona Septano	Indonesia	
7	7	Fang Chieh-min	Lee Sheng-mu	Chinese Taipei	
8	8	Koo Kien Keat	Tan Boon Heong	Malaysia	
9	11	Naoki Kawamae	Shoji Sato	Japan	
10	17	Bodin Isara	Maneepong Jongjit	Thailand	
11	18	Ingo Kindervater	Johannes Schöttler	Germany	
12	20	Vladimir Ivanov	Ivan Sozonov	Russia	
13	21	Howard Bach	Tony Gunawan	United States	Pan America
14	22	Adam Cwalina	Michal Logosz	Poland	
15	33	Ross Smith	Glenn Warfe	Australia	Oceania
16	48	Dorian James	Willem Viljoen	South Africa	Africa

=== Women's doubles ===
No.	Rank	Players		NOC	Note
1	1	Wang Xiaoli	Yu Yang	China	Asia
2	2	Tian Qing	Zhao Yunlei	China	
3	3	Ha Jung-eun	Kim Min-jung	South Korea	
4	4	Mizuki Fujii	Reika Kakiiwa	Japan	
5	5	Kamilla Rytter Juhl	Christinna Pedersen	Denmark	Europe
6	6	Miyuki Maeda	Satoko Suetsuna	Japan	
7	8	Jung Kyung-eun	Kim Ha-na	South Korea	
8	10	Cheng Wen-hsing	Chien Yu-chin	Chinese Taipei	
9	12	Greysia Polii	Meiliana Jauhari	Indonesia	
10	13	Shinta Mulia Sari	Yao Lei	Singapore	
11	15	Poon Lok Yan	Tse Ying Suet	Hong Kong	
12	16	Jwala Gutta	Ashwini Ponnappa	India	
13	18	Valeria Sorokina	Nina Vislova	Russia	
14	28	Alex Bruce	Michelle Li	Canada	Pan America
15	35	Leanne Choo	Renuga Veeran	Australia	Oceania
16	44	Michelle Edwards	Annari Viljoen	South Africa	Africa

=== Mixed doubles ===
No.	Rank	Players		NOC	Note
1	1	Zhang Nan	Zhao Yunlei	China	Asia
2	2	Xu Chen	Ma Jin	China	
3	3	Tontowi Ahmad	Liliyana Natsir	Indonesia	
4	4	Joachim Fischer Nielsen	Christinna Pedersen	Denmark	Europe
5	5	Chen Hung-ling	Cheng Wen-hsing	Chinese Taipei	
6	6	Thomas Laybourn	Kamilla Rytter Juhl	Denmark	
7	7	Lee Yong-dae	Ha Jung-eun	South Korea	
8	8	Sudket Prapakamol	Saralee Thungthongkam	Thailand	
9	9	Chan Peng Soon	Goh Liu Ying	Malaysia	
10	10	Chris Adcock	Imogen Bankier	Great Britain	
11	11	Shintaro Ikeda	Reiko Shiota	Japan	
12	12	Aleksandr Nikolaenko	Valeria Sorokina	Russia	
13	14	Valiyaveetil Diju	Jwala Gutta	India	
14	16	Michael Fuchs	Birgit Michels	Germany	
15	19	Robert Mateusiak	Nadieżda Zięba	Poland	
16	26	Toby Ng	Grace Gao	Canada	Pan America
