= 2010–2012 AVC Beach Volleyball Continental Cup =

41 Asian and Oceanian nations including 2 non IOC members (Macau and the Northern Mariana Islands) registered to take part in the 2010–12 Continental Beach Volleyball Cup. The top two from each subzone group qualify for the Zonal tournaments, with the top three from each zonal tournament advancing to the continental championship.

== Men ==
=== Preliminary round ===
==== Central Asia ====
===== Pool A =====
- Host: Chennai, India

25–26 September 2010

Pos	Team	Pld	W	L	Pts	SRI	IND	MDV
1	Sri Lanka	2	2	0	4	—	4–0	4–0
2	India	2	1	1	3	0–4	—	3–1
3	Maldives	2	0	2	2	0–4	1–3	—

Source: FIVB
- Sri Lanka and India advanced to the zonal round.

===== Pool B =====
- Host: Kish Island, Iran

3–4 March 2011

Pos	Team	Pld	W	L	Pts	IRI	KAZ	AFG
1	Iran	2	2	0	4	—	3–1	4–0
2	Kazakhstan	2	1	1	3	1–3	—	4–0
3	Afghanistan	2	0	2	2	0–4	0–4	—

Source: FIVB
- Iran and Kazakhstan advanced to the zonal round.

===== Zonal =====
- Host: Negombo, Sri Lanka

Semifinals
21 January 2012
Iran	4
India	0
21 January 2012
Sri Lanka	0
Kazakhstan	4

Final
22 January 2012
Iran	3
Kazakhstan	2
3rd place
22 January 2012
India	0
Sri Lanka	4

- Iran, Kazakhstan and Sri Lanka advanced to the final round.

==== East Asia ====
===== Pool A =====
- Host: Haikou, China

19–20 October 2010

Pos	Team	Pld	W	L	Pts	CHN	HKG	KOR
1	China	2	2	0	4	—	4–0	4–0
2	Hong Kong	2	1	1	3	0–4	—	4–0
3	South Korea	2	0	2	2	0–4	0–4	—

Source: FIVB
- China and Hong Kong advanced to the zonal round.

===== Pool B =====
- Host: Kaohsiung, Taiwan

24–26 December 2010

Pos	Team	Pld	W	L	Pts	JPN	TPE	MAC
1	Japan	2	2	0	4	—	4–0	4–0
2	Chinese Taipei	2	1	1	3	0–4	—	4–0
3	Macau	2	0	2	2	0–4	0–4	—

Source: FIVB
- Japan and Chinese Taipei advanced to the zonal round.

===== Zonal =====
- Host: Nanning, China

Semifinals
30 November 2011
China	4
Chinese Taipei	0
30 November 2011
Japan	3
Hong Kong	1

Final
1 December 2011
China	3
Japan	1
3rd place
1 December 2011
Chinese Taipei	2
Hong Kong	3

- China (as the hosts), Japan, Hong Kong and Chinese Taipei advanced to the final round.

==== Oceania ====
===== Pool A =====
- Host: Saipan, Northern Mariana Islands

5–7 March 2011

Pos	Team	Pld	W	L	Pts	AUS	PNG	GUM	NMI
1	Australia	3	3	0	6	—	4–0	4–0	4–0
2	Papua New Guinea	3	2	1	5	0–4	—	3–1	3–1
3	Guam	3	1	2	4	0–4	1–3	—	3–1
4	Northern Mariana Islands	3	0	3	3	0–4	1–3	1–3	—

Source: FIVB
- Australia and Papua New Guinea advanced to the zonal round.

===== Pool B =====
- Host: Mele, Vanuatu

20–21 May 2011

Pos	Team	Pld	W	L	Pts	VAN	FIJ	SOL
1	Vanuatu	2	2	0	4	—	3–1	3–1
2	Fiji	2	1	1	3	1–3	—	3–1
3	Solomon Islands	2	0	2	2	1–3	1–3	—

Source: AVC
- Vanuatu and Fiji advanced to the zonal round.

===== Pool C =====
- Host: Apia, Samoa

26–27 May 2011

Pos	Team	Pld	W	L	Pts	NZL	SAM	TGA
1	New Zealand	2	2	0	4	—	4–0	4–0
2	Samoa	2	1	1	3	0–4	—	3–1
3	Tonga	2	0	2	2	0–4	1–3	—

Source: AVC
- New Zealand and Samoa advanced to the zonal round.

===== Zonal =====
- Host: Mount Maunganui, New Zealand

Quarterfinals
16 February 2012
Papua New Guinea	1
Fiji	3
16 February 2012
Vanuatu	0
Samoa	4

Semifinals
17 February 2012
New Zealand	4
Fiji	0
17 February 2012
Samoa	0
Australia	4

Final
18 February 2012
New Zealand	0
Australia	4
3rd place
18 February 2012
Fiji	2
Samoa	3

5th place
17 February 2012
Papua New Guinea	2
Vanuatu	3

- Australia, New Zealand and Samoa advanced to the final round.

==== Southeast Asia ====
===== Pool A =====
- Host: Batam, Indonesia

24–26 April 2011

Pos	Team	Pld	W	L	Pts	INA	MAS	PHI	SIN
1	Indonesia	3	3	0	6	—	4–0	4–0	4–0
2	Malaysia	3	2	1	5	0–4	—	4–0	4–0
3	Philippines	3	1	2	4	0–4	0–4	—	4–0
4	Singapore	3	0	3	3	0–4	0–4	0–4	—

Source: AVC
- Indonesia and Malaysia advanced to the zonal round.

===== Pool B =====
- Host: Cha-am, Thailand

1–3 December 2010

Pos	Team	Pld	W	L	Pts	THA	VIE	LAO
1	Thailand	2	2	0	4	—	3–2	4–0
2	Vietnam	2	1	1	3	2–3	—	4–0
3	Laos	2	0	2	2	0–4	0–4	—

Source: FIVB
- Thailand and Vietnam advanced to the zonal round.

===== Zonal =====
- Host: Cha-am, Thailand

Semifinals
25 October 2011
Thailand	4
Malaysia	0
25 October 2011
Vietnam	1
Indonesia	3

Final
26–27 October 2011
Thailand	1
Indonesia	3
3rd place
26–27 October 2011
Malaysia	1
Vietnam	3

- Indonesia, Thailand and Vietnam advanced to the final round.

==== West Asia ====
- Host: Ajman, United Arab Emirates

19–22 November 2011

Pos	Team	Pld	W	L	Pts	OMA	BRN	QAT	UAE	KUW	IRQ
1	Oman	5	5	0	10	—	3–1	4–0	4–0	4–0	4–0
2	Bahrain	5	4	1	9	1–3	—	3–1	4–0	4–0	4–0
3	Qatar	5	3	2	8	0–4	1–3	—	3–2	4–0	4–0
4	United Arab Emirates	5	2	3	7	0–4	0–4	2–3	—	4–0	4–0
5	Kuwait	5	1	4	6	0–4	0–4	0–4	0–4	—	3–1
6	Iraq	5	0	5	5	0–4	0–4	0–4	0–4	1–3	—

Source: FIVB
- Oman, Bahrain and Qatar advanced to the final round.

=== Final round ===
- Host: Fuzhou, China

Round of 16
21 June 2012
New Zealand	1
Kazakhstan	3
20 June 2012
Oman	3
Sri Lanka	0
20 June 2012
Samoa	0
Indonesia	3
20 June 2012
Iran	3
Vietnam	0
20 June 2012
Qatar	0
Japan	3
21 June 2012
Bahrain	0
Thailand	3

Quarterfinals
22 June 2012
Australia	3
Kazakhstan	0
22 June 2012
Oman	1
Indonesia	3
22 June 2012
Iran	2
Japan	3
22 June 2012
Thailand	0
China	3

Semifinals
23 June 2012
Australia	3
Indonesia	2
23 June 2012
Japan	3
China	1

Final
24 June 2012
Australia	2
Japan	3
3rd place
24 June 2012
Indonesia	0
China	3

== Women ==
=== Preliminary round ===
==== Central Asia ====
===== Pool A =====
- Host: Chennai, India

25–26 September 2010

Pos	Team	Pld	W	L	Pts	SRI	IND	MDV
1	Sri Lanka	2	2	0	4	—	4–0	4–0
2	India	2	1	1	3	0–4	—	4–0
3	Maldives	2	0	2	2	0–4	0–4	—

Source: FIVB
- With only Kazakhstan registering for Pool B, all three teams advanced to the zonal round.

===== Zonal =====
- Host: Negombo, Sri Lanka

Semifinals
21 January 2012
Sri Lanka	4
Maldives	0
21 January 2012
Kazakhstan	4
India	0

Final
22 January 2012
Sri Lanka	1
Kazakhstan	3
3rd place
22 January 2012
Maldives	1
India	3

- Kazakhstan, Sri Lanka and India advanced to the final round.

==== East Asia ====
===== Pool A =====
- Host: Haikou, China

19–20 October 2010

Pos	Team	Pld	W	L	Pts	CHN	HKG	KOR
1	China	2	2	0	4	—	4–0	4–0
2	Hong Kong	2	1	1	3	0–4	—	4–0
3	South Korea	2	0	2	2	0–4	0–4	—

Source: FIVB
- China and Hong Kong advanced to the zonal round.

===== Pool B =====
- Host: Kaohsiung, Taiwan

24–26 December 2010

Pos	Team	Pld	W	L	Pts	JPN	TPE	MAC
1	Japan	2	2	0	4	—	3–2	4–0
2	Chinese Taipei	2	1	1	3	2–3	—	4–0
3	Macau	2	0	2	2	0–4	0–4	—

Source: FIVB
- Japan and Chinese Taipei advanced to the zonal round.

===== Zonal =====
- Host: Nanning, China

Semifinals
30 November 2011
China	3
Chinese Taipei	1
30 November 2011
Japan	4
Hong Kong	0

Final
1 December 2011
China	3
Japan	1
3rd place
1 December 2011
Chinese Taipei	3
Hong Kong	1

- China (as the hosts), Japan, Chinese Taipei and Hong Kong advanced to the final round.

==== Oceania ====
===== Pool A =====
- Host: Saipan, Northern Mariana Islands

5–7 March 2011

Pos	Team	Pld	W	L	Pts	AUS	NMI	PNG	GUM
1	Australia	3	3	0	6	—	4–0	4–0	4–0
2	Northern Mariana Islands	3	2	1	5	0–4	—	3–2	4–0
3	Papua New Guinea	3	1	2	4	0–4	2–3	—	4–0
4	Guam	3	0	3	3	0–4	0–4	0–4	—

Source: FIVB
- Australia and Northern Mariana Islands advanced to the zonal round.

===== Pool B =====
- Host: Mele, Vanuatu

20–21 May 2011

Pos	Team	Pld	W	L	Pts	VAN	FIJ	SOL
1	Vanuatu	2	2	0	4	—	4–0	4–0
2	Fiji	2	1	1	3	0–4	—	3–1
3	Solomon Islands	2	0	2	2	0–4	1–3	—

Source: AVC
- Vanuatu and Fiji advanced to the zonal round.

===== Pool C =====
- Host: Apia, Samoa

26–27 May 2011

Pos	Team	Pld	W	L	Pts	NZL	SAM	TGA
1	New Zealand	2	2	0	4	—	4–0	4–0
2	Samoa	2	1	1	3	0–4	—	4–0
3	Tonga	2	0	2	2	0–4	0–4	—

Source: AVC
- New Zealand and Samoa advanced to the zonal round.

===== Zonal =====
- Host: Mount Maunganui, New Zealand

Quarterfinals
16 February 2012
Fiji	2
Samoa	3

Semifinals
17 February 2012
Australia	4
Samoa	0
17 February 2012
New Zealand	0
Vanuatu	4

Final
18 February 2012
Australia	3
Vanuatu	1
3rd place
18 February 2012
Samoa	0
New Zealand	4

- Australia, Vanuatu and New Zealand advanced to the final round.

==== Southeast Asia ====
===== Pool A =====
- Host: Batam, Indonesia

24–26 April 2011

Pos	Team	Pld	W	L	Pts	MAS	INA	PHI	SIN
1	Malaysia	3	3	0	6	—	3–2	3–1	4–0
2	Indonesia	3	2	1	5	2–3	—	3–1	4–0
3	Philippines	3	1	2	4	1–3	1–3	—	3–1
4	Singapore	3	0	3	3	0–4	0–4	1–3	—

Source: AVC
- Malaysia and Indonesia advanced to the zonal round.

===== Pool B =====
- Host: Cha-am, Thailand

1–3 December 2010

Pos	Team	Pld	W	L	Pts	THA	VIE	LAO
1	Thailand	2	2	0	4	—	4–0	4–0
2	Vietnam	2	1	1	3	0–4	—	4–0
3	Laos	2	0	2	2	0–4	0–4	—

Source: FIVB
- Thailand and Vietnam advanced to the zonal round.

===== Zonal =====
- Host: Cha-am, Thailand

Semifinals
25 October 2011
Thailand	4
Indonesia	0
25 October 2011
Vietnam	3
Malaysia	1

Final
26–27 October 2011
Thailand	4
Vietnam	0
3rd place
26–27 October 2011
Indonesia	3
Malaysia	2

- Thailand, Vietnam and Indonesia advanced to the final round.

=== Final round ===
- Host: Fuzhou, China

Round of 16
21 June 2012
Hong Kong	0
Vanuatu	3
20 June 2012
Vietnam	3
New Zealand	0
20 June 2012
Indonesia	2
Kazakhstan	3
21 June 2012
India	0
Japan	3
21 June 2012
Sri Lanka	0
Chinese Taipei	3

Quarterfinals
22 June 2012
China	3
Vanuatu	0
22 June 2012
Vietnam	1
Kazakhstan	3
22 June 2012
Thailand	3
Japan	1
22 June 2012
Chinese Taipei	1
Australia	3

Semifinals
23 June 2012
China	3
Kazakhstan	0
23 June 2012
Thailand	1
Australia	3

Final
24 June 2012
China	0
Australia	3
3rd place
24 June 2012
Kazakhstan	3
Thailand	0
