= Badminton at the 2012 Summer Olympics =

Coordinates: 51.5581°N 0.2830°W

Badminton at the Games of the XXX Olympiad
- Venue: Wembley Arena
- Dates: 28 July – 5 August 2012
- No. of events: 5 (2 men, 2 women, 1 mixed)
- Competitors: 172

The badminton tournaments at the 2012 Olympic Games in London took place between 28 July and 5 August at Wembley Arena.

A total of 172 athletes competed in five events: men's singles, women's singles, men's doubles, women's doubles and mixed doubles. The women's doubles tournament was marred by several disqualifications during the group stage for unethical play.

All of the gold medals were won by players from China. The Chinese team also collected two silvers and one bronze, to top the medal table with eight in total. Denmark finished in second place, with one silver and one bronze won.

== Competition format ==
For the first time there was a combination of group play and knockout stages in the Olympic badminton tournament, following its introduction at the 2010 Youth Summer Olympics in Singapore.

All matches were the best of three games, with each game won by the first player to reach 21 points. If the score reached 20–20, the winner was the first player to lead by two points. If the score reached 29–29, the player who won the next point won the match.

The draw for the groups was held on 23 July 2012.

== Qualification ==
The Olympic qualification period was between 2 May 2011 and 29 April 2012, and the Badminton World Federation rankings list, published on 3 May 2012, was used to allocate spots. Nations could enter a maximum of three players. Three quota places if three players are ranked four or above, two if two players are ranked 16 or above and otherwise one quota place until the quota contingent of 38 is filled.

For each male player who qualifies in more than one discipline, an additional quota place in the men's singles becomes free. If no player from one continent can qualify, the best ranked player from this continent gets a quota place.

== Competition schedule ==
P	Preliminaries	R	Round of 16	¼	Quarterfinals	½	Semifinals	F	Final

Date →	Sat 28			Sun 29			Mon 30			Tue 31			Wed 1			Thu 2			Fri 3		Sat 4		Sun 5	
Event ↓	M	A	E	M	A	E	M	A	E	M	A	E	M	A	E	M	A	E	M	A	M	A	M	A
Men's singles	P												R					¼		½				F
Men's doubles	P															¼						½		F
Mixed doubles	P												¼				½			F				
Women's singles	P												R				¼		½			F		
Women's doubles	P														¼			½				F		

M = Morning session, A = Afternoon session, E = Evening session

== Women's doubles disqualifications ==
On 1 August 2012, four teams were ejected from the competition (Wang Xiaoli and Yu Yang of China, Jung Kyung-eun and Kim Ha-na with Ha Jung-eun and Kim Min-jung, both playing for South Korea, and Meiliana Jauhari and Greysia Polii of Indonesia) for "not using one's best efforts to win a match" and "conducting oneself in a manner that is clearly abusive or detrimental to the sport" following round-robin matches the previous evening, during which the teams were accused of trying to lose in order to manipulate the draw.

== Participation ==
A total of 172 badminton players from 51 Olympic Committees (NOCs) from the five Continental Confederations will participate at the 2012 Summer Olympics.

=== Participating nations ===
Below is the list of NOCs participants in badminton competition at the 2012 Summer Olympics.

- Australia (5)
- Austria (2)
- Belarus (1)
- Belgium (2)
- Bulgaria (1)
- Canada (4)
- China (17)
- Czech Republic (2)
- Denmark (9)
- Egypt (1)
- Estonia (1)
- Finland (2)
- France (2)
- Germany (6)
- Great Britain (4) Host
- Guatemala (1)
- Hong Kong (4)
- Iceland (1)
- India (5)
- Indonesia (9)
- Ireland (2)
- Israel (1)
- Italy (1)
- Japan (11)
- Lithuania (1)
- Malaysia (6)
- Maldives (1)
- Mexico (1)
- Netherlands (1)
- Norway (1)
- Peru (2)
- Poland (6)
- Portugal (2)
- Russia (6)
- Singapore (4)
- Slovakia (1)
- Slovenia (1)
- South Africa (4)
- South Korea (12)
- Spain (2)
- Sri Lanka (2)
- Suriname (1)
- Sweden (1)
- Switzerland (1)
- Chinese Taipei (8)
- Thailand (6)
- Turkey (1)
- Uganda (1)
- Ukraine (2)
- United States (3)
- Vietnam (1)

== Medal summary ==
=== Medal table ===
Rank	Nation	Gold	Silver	Bronze	Total
1	China	5	2	1	8
2	Denmark	0	1	1	2
3	Japan	0	1	0	1
3	Malaysia	0	1	0	1
5	India	0	0	1	1
5	Russia	0	0	1	1
5	South Korea	0	0	1	1
Totals (7 entries)		5	5	5	15

=== Medalists ===
Event	Gold	Silver	Bronze
Men's singles	Lin Dan; China	Lee Chong Wei; Malaysia	Chen Long; China
Men's doubles	Cai Yun; Fu Haifeng; China	Mathias Boe; Carsten Mogensen; Denmark	Jung Jae-sung; Lee Yong-dae; South Korea
Women's singles	Li Xuerui; China	Wang Yihan; China	Saina Nehwal; India
Women's doubles	Tian Qing; Zhao Yunlei; China	Mizuki Fujii; Reika Kakiiwa; Japan	Valeria Sorokina; Nina Vislova; Russia
Mixed doubles	Zhang Nan; Zhao Yunlei; China	Xu Chen; Ma Jin; China	Joachim Fischer Nielsen; Christinna Pedersen; Denmark

== Results ==
=== Men's singles ===
Quarterfinals
A1	Lee Chong Wei (MAS)	21	21
D1	Parupalli Kashyap (IND)	19	11
E1	Chen Long (CHN)	21	21
G1	Peter Gade (DEN)	16	13
J1	Lee Hyun-il (KOR)	21	21
L1	Chen Jin (CHN)	15	16
N1	Sho Sasaki (JPN)	12	21	16
P1	Lin Dan (CHN)	21	16	21

Semifinals
A1	Lee Chong Wei (MAS)	21	21
E1	Chen Long (CHN)	13	14
J1	Lee Hyun-il (KOR)	12	10
P1	Lin Dan (CHN)	21	21

Finals
A1	Lee Chong Wei (MAS)	21	10	19
P1	Lin Dan (CHN)	15	21	21
Third place
E1	Chen Long (CHN)	21	15	21
J1	Lee Hyun-il (KOR)	12	21	15

=== Women's singles ===
Quarterfinals
A1	Wang Yihan (CHN)	21	21
C1	Cheng Shao-chieh (TPE)	14	11
E1	Saina Nehwal (IND)	21	22
G1	Tine Baun (DEN)	15	20
J1	Yip Pui Yin (HKG)	12	20
L1	Li Xuerui (CHN)	21	22
M1	Ratchanok Intanon (THA)	21	18	14
P1	Wang Xin (CHN)	17	21	21

Semifinals
A1	Wang Yihan (CHN)	21	21
E1	Saina Nehwal (IND)	13	13
L1	Li Xuerui (CHN)	22	21
P1	Wang Xin (CHN)	20	18

Finals
A1	Wang Yihan (CHN)	15	23	17
L1	Li Xuerui (CHN)	21	21	21
Third place
E1	Saina Nehwal (IND)	18	0
P1	Wang Xin (CHN)	21	1 (r)

=== Men's doubles ===
Quarterfinals
A1	Cai Yun (CHN); Fu Haifeng (CHN)	21	21
C2	Chai Biao (CHN); Guo Zhendong (CHN)	15	19
B1	Bodin Isara (THA); Maneepong Jongjit (THA)	16	18
D2	Koo Kien Keat (MAS); Tan Boon Heong (MAS)	21	21
A2	Fang Chieh-min (TPE); Lee Sheng-mu (TPE)	16	18
C1	Mathias Boe (DEN); Carsten Mogensen (DEN)	21	21
B2	Mohammad Ahsan (INA); Bona Septano (INA)	12	16
D1	Jung Jae-sung (KOR); Lee Yong-dae (KOR)	21	21

Semifinals
A1	Cai Yun (CHN); Fu Haifeng (CHN)	21	21
D2	Koo Kien Keat (MAS); Tan Boon Heong (MAS)	9	19
C1	Mathias Boe (DEN); Carsten Mogensen (DEN)	17	21	22
D1	Jung Jae-sung (KOR); Lee Yong-dae (KOR)	21	18	20

Finals
A1	Cai Yun (CHN); Fu Haifeng (CHN)	21	21
C1	Mathias Boe (DEN); Carsten Mogensen (DEN)	16	15
Third place
D2	Koo Kien Keat (MAS); Tan Boon Heong (MAS)	21	10
D1	Jung Jae-sung (KOR); Lee Yong-dae (KOR)	23	21

=== Women's doubles ===
Quarterfinals
A1	Valeria Sorokina (RUS); Nina Vislova (RUS)	21	21
C2	Michelle Edwards (RSA); Annari Viljoen (RSA)	9	7
B1	Cheng Wen-hsing (TPE); Chien Yu-chin (TPE)	10	14
D2	Tian Qing (CHN); Zhao Yunlei (CHN)	21	21
A2	Alex Bruce (CAN); Michelle Li (CAN)	21	18	21
C1	Leanne Choo (AUS); Renuga Veeran (AUS)	9	21	18
B2	Mizuki Fujii (JPN); Reika Kakiiwa (JPN)	22	21
D1	Christinna Pedersen (DEN); Kamilla Rytter Juhl (DEN)	20	10

Semifinals
A1	Valeria Sorokina (RUS); Nina Vislova (RUS)	19	6
D2	Tian Qing (CHN); Zhao Yunlei (CHN)	21	21
A2	Alex Bruce (CAN); Michelle Li (CAN)	12	21	13
B2	Mizuki Fujii (JPN); Reika Kakiiwa (JPN)	21	19	21

Finals
D2	Tian Qing (CHN); Zhao Yunlei (CHN)	21	25
B2	Mizuki Fujii (JPN); Reika Kakiiwa (JPN)	10	23
Third place
A1	Valeria Sorokina (RUS); Nina Vislova (RUS)	21	21
A2	Alex Bruce (CAN); Michelle Li (CAN)	9	10

=== Mixed doubles ===
Quarterfinals
A1	Zhang Nan (CHN); Zhao Yunlei (CHN)	21	21
C2	Thomas Laybourn (DEN); Kamilla Rytter Juhl (DEN)	13	17
B1	J Fischer Nielsen (DEN); Christinna Pedersen (DEN)	21	21
D2	Sudket Prapakamol (THA); Saralee Thungthongkam (THA)	15	13
A2	Michael Fuchs (GER); Birgit Michels (GER)	15	9
C1	Tontowi Ahmad (INA); Liliyana Natsir (INA)	21	21
B2	Robert Mateusiak (POL); Nadieżda Zięba (POL)	21	16	21
D1	Xu Chen (CHN); Ma Jin (CHN)	19	21	23

Semifinals
A1	Zhang Nan (CHN); Zhao Yunlei (CHN)	17	21	21
B1	J Fischer Nielsen (DEN); Christinna Pedersen (DEN)	21	17	19
C1	Tontowi Ahmad (INA); Liliyana Natsir (INA)	23	18	13
D1	Xu Chen (CHN); Ma Jin (CHN)	21	21	21

Finals
A1	Zhang Nan (CHN); Zhao Yunlei (CHN)	21	21
D1	Xu Chen (CHN); Ma Jin (CHN)	11	17
Third place
B1	J Fischer Nielsen (DEN); Christinna Pedersen (DEN)	21	21
C1	Tontowi Ahmad (INA); Liliyana Natsir (INA)	12	12
