= Ram Singh Yadav =

Indian marathon runner

Ram Singh
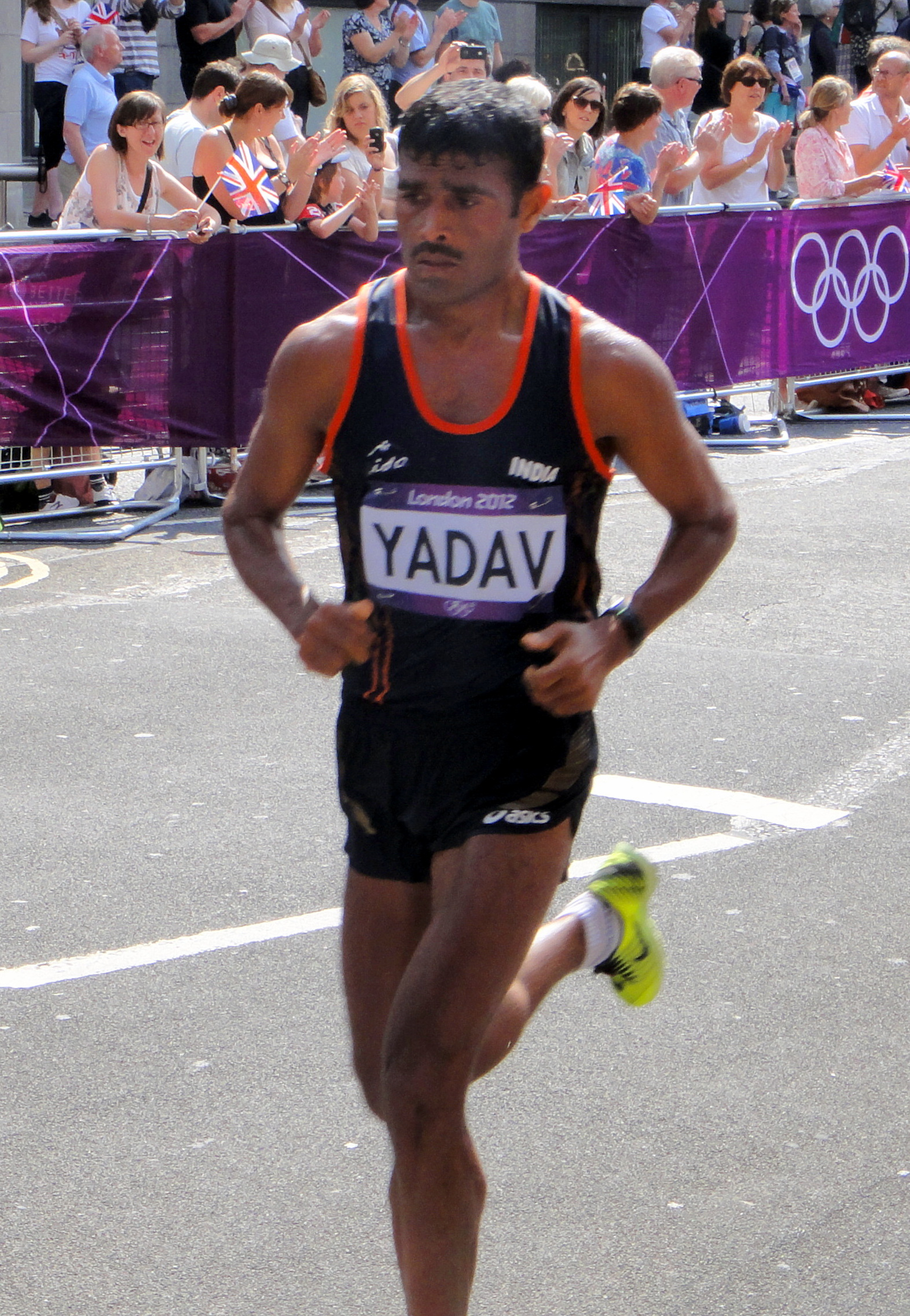
- Ram Singh Yadav in the marathon at the 2012 Summer Olympics in London

Personal information
- Nationality: Indian
- Born: 7 November 1984 (age 41) Varanasi
- Occupation: Havildar (Indian Army)

Sport
- Sport: Track and field
- Event: Marathon

Ram Singh Yadav (born 7 November 1984) is an Indian marathon runner. Ram represented India at the 2012 Summer Olympics, London. He achieved the B qualification standard (2:18:00) by clocking a time of 2:16:59 at the 2012 Mumbai Marathon, which is also his best performance in this event. He is the second Indian athlete ever to be qualified for the marathon event of the Olympics. Before Yadav, Shivnath Singh was the Indian athlete who participated in the 1976 Summer Olympics in Montreal. Ram is a havildar in the Indian Army.

== Personal life ==
Ram is from Babiyan village, Varanasi, Uttar Pradesh. His father was a fruit-seller in Mumbai. Ram married Urmila Yadav in 2001 and they have three children, Amit, Ankit and Alok. He is a havildar in the Indian Army and currently posted in Hyderabad’s Artillery Centre. He trains at Pune-based Army Sports Institute.

== Olympic qualification ==
Ram missed the B qualification standard of 2:18:00 in 2008 during the 2009 Mumbai Marathon for Beijing Olympics' marathon event by few seconds, and thus did not qualify. He completed his race in 2:18:23 and finished 10th in the final standings. But president of the Indian Olympic Association, Suresh Kalmadi, mistakenly announced that Ram had qualified for the Olympics, which was later corrected by the organisers.

For the 2012 Summer Olympics, Ram underwent training for 45 days at a high-altitude training centre in Coonoor town of Nilgiris district, Tamil Nadu. 2012 Mumbai Marathon was the first event he took part in after his training, the same event where he failed to claim an Olympic berth four years ago. Ram took 2:16:59 to finish the race, well under the B qualification standard of 2:18:00. He finished 12th overall in the final standings. 2:16:59 is also the personal best of Ram. Ram is only the second Indian athlete ever to be qualified for the marathon event of the Olympics. Shivnath Singh of Bihar was the first Indian athlete to participate in the Olympics marathon. He participated twice in the Olympic Games—1976 and 1980.

== Olympic Games ==
At the London 2012 Olympic Games, he completed the marathon with a time of 2:30:06 which placed him 78th in the final rankings. From a field of 105 starters, as many as 20 runners failed to finish the grueling marathon final, which was won by Uganda's Stephen Kiprotich in a time of 2:08:01.

== See also ==
- India at the Olympics
- India at the 2012 Summer Olympics
- List of Indian records in athletics
