= Badminton at the 2012 Summer Olympics – Mixed doubles =

Mixed doubles at the Games of the XXX Olympiad
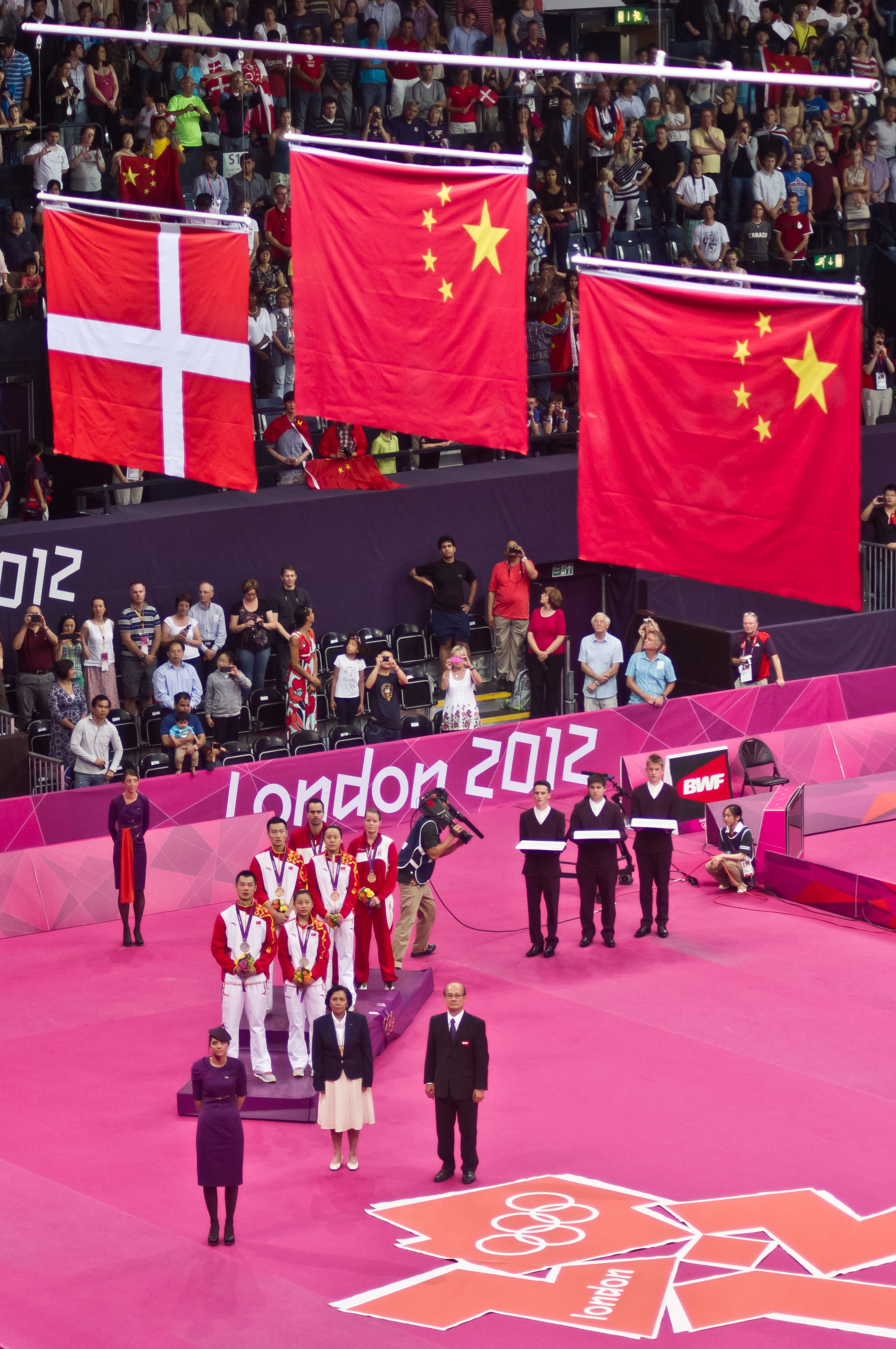
- Mixed doubles victory ceremony
- Venue: Wembley Arena
- Date: 28 July to 3 August
- Competitors: 32 from 14 nations

Medalists
1st place, gold medalist(s)		Zhang Nan; Zhao Yunlei	China
2nd place, silver medalist(s)		Xu Chen; Ma Jin	China
3rd place, bronze medalist(s)		Joachim Fischer Nielsen; Christinna Pedersen	Denmark

The badminton mixed doubles tournament at the 2012 Olympic Games in London took place from 28 July to 3 August at Wembley Arena.

The draw was held on 23 July 2012. Thirty-two players from 14 nations competed in the event.

The Chinese team of Zhang Nan and Zhao Yunlei won the gold medal, defeating Xu Chen and Ma Jin, also from China, in the final. Denmark pairing Joachim Fischer Nielsen and Christinna Pedersen won the bronze.

== Competition format ==
The tournament started with a group phase round-robin followed by a knockout stage.

== Seeds ==
1. Zhang Nan / Zhao Yunlei (CHN) (gold medallists)
2. Xu Chen / Ma Jin (CHN) (silver medallists)
3. Joachim Fischer Nielsen / Christinna Pedersen (DEN) (bronze medallists)
4. Tontowi Ahmad / Liliyana Natsir (INA) (fourth place)

== Results ==
=== Group stage ===
==== Group A ====
Team	Pld	W	L	SW	SL	Pts
Zhang Nan / Zhao Yunlei (CHN)	3	3	0	6	0	3
Michael Fuchs / Birgit Michels (GER)	3	2	1	4	4	2
Aleksandr Nikolaenko / Valeria Sorokina (RUS)	3	1	2	3	5	1
Chris Adcock / Imogen Bankier (GBR)	3	0	3	2	6	0

Team 1	Score	Team 2
28 July, 09:40
Adcock / Bankier (GBR)	21–14; 9–21; 18–21	Nikolaenko / Sorokina (RUS)
28 July, 18:30
Zhang N / Zhao Y (CHN)	21–6; 21–7	Fuchs / Michels (GER)
29 July, 08:30
Adcock / Bankier (GBR)	21–11; 17–21; 14–21	Fuchs / Michels (GER)
29 July, 12:30
Zhang N / Zhao Y (CHN)	21–9; 21–18	Nikolaenko / Sorokina (RUS)
30 July, 18:30
Nikolaenko / Sorokina (RUS)	18–21; 21–12; 19–21	Fuchs / Michels (GER)
31 July, 15:20
Zhang N / Zhao Y (CHN)	21–13; 21–14	Adcock / Bankier (GBR)

==== Group B ====
Team	Pld	W	L	SW	SL	Pts
Joachim Fischer Nielsen / Christinna Pedersen (DEN)	3	3	0	6	1	3
Robert Mateusiak / Nadieżda Zięba (POL)	3	2	1	5	2	2
Shintaro Ikeda / Reiko Shiota (JPN)	3	1	2	2	5	1
Toby Ng / Grace Gao (CAN)	3	0	3	1	6	0

Team 1	Score	Team 2
28 July, 08:30
Ikeda / Shiota (JPN)	18–21; 20–22	Mateusiak / Zięba (POL)
28 July, 14:19
Nielsen / Pedersen (DEN)	21–12; 21–11	Ng / Gao (CAN)
29 July, 20:50
Ikeda / Shiota (JPN)	21–10; 11–21; 21–15	Ng / Gao (CAN)
30 July, 09:42
Nielsen / Pedersen (DEN)	21–9; 14–21; 21–17	Mateusiak / Zięba (POL)
31 July, 19:40
Nielsen / Pedersen (DEN)	21–11; 21–10	Ikeda / Shiota (JPN)
31 July, 20:17
Mateusiak / Zięba (POL)	21–13; 21–16	Ng / Gao (CAN)

==== Group C ====
Team	Pld	W	L	SW	SL	Pts
Tontowi Ahmad / Liliyana Natsir (INA)	3	3	0	6	0	3
Thomas Laybourn / Kamilla Rytter Juhl (DEN)	3	2	1	4	2	2
Lee Yong-dae / Ha Jung-eun (KOR)	3	1	2	2	4	1
Valiyaveetil Diju / Jwala Gutta (IND)	3	0	3	0	6	0

Team 1	Score	Team 2
28 July, 08:30
Ahmad / Natsir (INA)	21–16; 21–12	Diju / Gutta (IND)
29 July, 09:07
Ahmad / Natsir (INA)	21–19; 21–12	Lee Y-d / Ha J-e (KOR)
29 July, 13:05
Laybourn / Juhl (DEN)	21–12; 21–16	Diju / Gutta (IND)
30 July, 12:30
Laybourn / Juhl (DEN)	21–15; 21–12	Lee Y-d / Ha J-e (KOR)
31 July, 09:42
Lee Y-d / Ha J-e (KOR)	21–15; 21–15	Diju / Gutta (IND)
31 July, 18:30
Ahmad / Natsir (INA)	24–22; 21–16	Laybourn / Juhl (DEN)

==== Group D ====
Team	Pld	W	L	SW	SL	Pts
Xu Chen / Ma Jin (CHN)	3	3	0	6	0	3
Sudket Prapakamol / Saralee Thungthongkam (THA)	3	2	1	4	2	2
Chen Hung-ling / Cheng Wen-hsing (TPE)	3	1	2	2	5	1
Chan Peng Soon / Goh Liu Ying (MAS)	3	0	3	1	6	0

Team 1	Score	Team 2
28 July, 12:30
Chen H-l / Cheng W-h (TPE)	21–12; 6–21; 21–15	Chan / Goh (MAS)
29 July, 12:30
Chen H-l / Cheng W-h (TPE)	15–21; 16–21	Prapakamol / Thungthongkam (THA)
29 July, 19:09
Xu C / Ma J (CHN)	21–14; 21–8	Chan / Goh (MAS)
30 July, 13:40
Xu C / Ma J (CHN)	21–19; 21–12	Prapakamol / Thungthongkam (THA)
31 July, 08:30
Prapakamol / Thungthongkam (THA)	21–16; 21–15	Chan / Goh (MAS)
31 July, 20:15
Xu C / Ma J (CHN)	21–16; 22–20	Chen H-l / Cheng W-h (TPE)

=== Finals ===
Quarter-finals
A1	Zhang Nan (CHN); Zhao Yunlei (CHN)	21	21
C2	Thomas Laybourn (DEN); Kamilla Rytter Juhl (DEN)	13	17
B1	J Fischer Nielsen (DEN); Christinna Pedersen (DEN)	21	21
D2	Sudket Prapakamol (THA); Saralee Thungthongkam (THA)	15	13
A2	Michael Fuchs (GER); Birgit Michels (GER)	15	9
C1	Tontowi Ahmad (INA); Liliyana Natsir (INA)	21	21
B2	Robert Mateusiak (POL); Nadieżda Zięba (POL)	21	16	21
D1	Xu Chen (CHN); Ma Jin (CHN)	19	21	23

Semi-finals
A1	Zhang Nan (CHN); Zhao Yunlei (CHN)	17	21	21
B1	J Fischer Nielsen (DEN); Christinna Pedersen (DEN)	21	17	19
C1	Tontowi Ahmad (INA); Liliyana Natsir (INA)	23	18	13
D1	Xu Chen (CHN); Ma Jin (CHN)	21	21	21

Final
A1	Zhang Nan (CHN); Zhao Yunlei (CHN)	21	21
D1	Xu Chen (CHN); Ma Jin (CHN)	11	17
Bronze medal match
B1	J Fischer Nielsen (DEN); Christinna Pedersen (DEN)	21	21
C1	Tontowi Ahmad (INA); Liliyana Natsir (INA)	12	12
