= Denmark at the 2012 Summer Olympics =

- IOC code: DEN
- NOC: National Olympic Committee and Sports Confederation of Denmark
- Website: www.dif.dk (in Danish and English)

in London
- Competitors: 113 in 17 sports
- Flag bearers: Kim Wraae Knudsen (opening); Allan Nørregaard (closing)
- Medals Ranked 29th: Gold 2 Silver 4 Bronze 3 Total 9

Summer Olympics appearances (overview)
- 1896; 1900; 1904; 1908; 1912; 1920; 1924; 1928; 1932; 1936; 1948; 1952; 1956; 1960; 1964; 1968; 1972; 1976; 1980; 1984; 1988; 1992; 1996; 2000; 2004; 2008; 2012; 2016; 2020; 2024

Other related appearances
- 1906 Intercalated Games

Denmark competed at the 2012 Summer Olympics in London, from 27 July to 12 August 2012. The National Olympic Committee and Sports Confederation of Denmark sent the nation's second largest delegation to the Games after the 1996 Summer Olympics in Atlanta. A total of 113 athletes, 63 men and 50 women, competed in 17 sports, although two additional athletes played as team reserves. Handball was the only team-based sport in which Denmark was represented in at these Olympic games.

The Danish team included several past Olympic champions, one of them defending (the men's lightweight coxless fours team, led by veteran rowers Eskild Ebbesen and Morten Jørgensen). Notable athletes included tennis player Caroline Wozniacki, and swimmer Lotte Friis, who won a bronze medal in Beijing. Kim Wraae Knudsen, silver medalist in the men's sprint kayak doubles in Beijing, was the nation's flag bearer at the opening ceremony.

Team Danmark and the Danish Sports' Union (Dansk Idræts-Forbund, DIF) set a goal of eight medals. Team Danmark and DIF also believed Denmark had the best chances of winning a medal in wrestling, shooting, cycling, handball, the equestrian events, rowing, athletics, badminton and sailing. At the end of the Games, Denmark had reached beyond the medal target by a single point.

Denmark left London with a total of 9 medals (2 gold, 4 silver, and 3 bronze), this being considered its most successful Olympics in 64 years. The gold medals were won by rowers Rasmus Quist Hansen and Mads Rasmussen in the men's lightweight double sculls, and track cyclist Lasse Norman Hansen in the first ever men's omnium. Other medals were awarded to the team in sailing, shooting, badminton, and women's rowing. Several Danish athletes narrowly missed out on the medal standings in their sporting events, including two competitors in the Greco-Roman wrestling.

== Medalists ==
Medal	Name	Sport	Event	Date
Gold	Rasmus Quist; Mads Rasmussen	Rowing	Men's lightweight double sculls	4 August
Gold	Lasse Norman Hansen	Cycling	Men's omnium	5 August
Silver	Anders Golding	Shooting	Men's skeet	31 July
Silver	Fie Udby Erichsen	Rowing	Women's single sculls	4 August
Silver	Jonas Høgh-Christensen	Sailing	Finn class	5 August
Silver	Mathias Boe; Carsten Mogensen	Badminton	Men's doubles	5 August
Bronze	Kasper Winther Jørgensen; Morten Jørgensen; Jacob Barsøe; Eskild Ebbesen	Rowing	Men's lightweight coxless four	2 August
Bronze	Joachim Fischer; Christinna Pedersen	Badminton	Mixed doubles	3 August
Bronze	Peter Lang; Allan Nørregaard	Sailing	49er	8 August

Medals by sport
Sport	1st place, gold medalist(s)	2nd place, silver medalist(s)	3rd place, bronze medalist(s)	Total
Rowing	1	1	1	3
Cycling	1	0	0	1
Badminton	0	1	1	2
Sailing	0	1	1	2
Shooting	0	1	0	1
Total	2	4	3	9

== Competitors ==
The following is the list of number of competitors participating in the Games:

Sport	Men	Women	Total
Archery	0	3	3
Athletics	3	3	6
Badminton	6	4	10
Boxing	1	0	1
Canoeing	4	1	5
Cycling	10	1	11
Equestrian	0	4	4
Gymnastics	1	0	1
Handball	14	14	28
Rowing	7	3	10
Sailing	5	6	11
Shooting	3	2	5
Swimming	5	5	10
Table tennis	2	1	3
Tennis	0	1	1
Triathlon	0	2	2
Wrestling	2	0	2
Total	63	50	113

Medals by date
Day	Date	1st place, gold medalist(s)	2nd place, silver medalist(s)	3rd place, bronze medalist(s)	Total
Day 1	28 July	0	0	0	0
Day 2	29 July	0	0	0	0
Day 3	30 July	0	0	0	0
Day 4	31 July	0	1	0	1
Day 5	1 August	0	0	0	0
Day 6	2 August	0	0	1	1
Day 7	3 August	0	0	1	1
Day 8	4 August	1	1	0	2
Day 9	5 August	1	2	0	3
Day 10	6 August	0	0	0	0
Day 11	7 August	0	0	0	0
Day 12	8 August	0	0	1	1
Day 13	9 August	0	0	0	0
Day 14	10 August	0	0	0	0
Day 15	11 August	0	0	0	0
Day 16	12 August	0	0	0	0
Total		2	4	3	9

== Archery ==
Three Danish individual quota places as well as a team quota place were secured at the 2011 World Archery Championships on 6 June 2011, as the Danish team, consisting of Carina Christiansen, Maja Jager and Louise Laursen, finished 8th in the women's recurve event. The same three archers were selected for participation by the NOC on 14 May 2012.

Athlete	Event	Ranking round		Round of 64	Round of 32	Round of 16	Quarterfinals	Semifinals	Final / BM	
Athlete	Event	Score	Seed	Opposition Score	Opposition Score	Opposition Score	Opposition Score	Opposition Score	Opposition Score	Rank
Carina Christiansen	Women's individual	663	7	Barnard (AUS) (58); W 7–3	Le C-y (TPE) (39); W 6–4	Avitia (MEX) (10); L 2–6	did not advance			
Maja Jager	Women's individual	642	35	Richter (GER) (30); L 5–6	Did not advance					
Louise Laursen	Women's individual	641	36	Beaudet (CAN) (29); W 7–3	Lorig (USA) (4); L 4–6	Did not advance				
Carina Christiansen; Maja Jager; Louise Laursen	Women's team	1946	8	—N/a		India (9); W 211–210	South Korea (1); L 195–206	Did not advance		

== Athletics ==
Danish athletes have so far achieved qualifying standards in the following athletics events (up to a maximum of 3 athletes in each event at the 'A' Standard, and 1 at the 'B' Standard):

Key

- Note – Ranks given for track events are within the athlete's heat only
- Q = Qualified for the next round
- q = Qualified for the next round as a fastest loser or, in field events, by position without achieving the qualifying target
- NR = National record
- N/A = Round not applicable for the event
- Bye = Athlete not required to compete in round

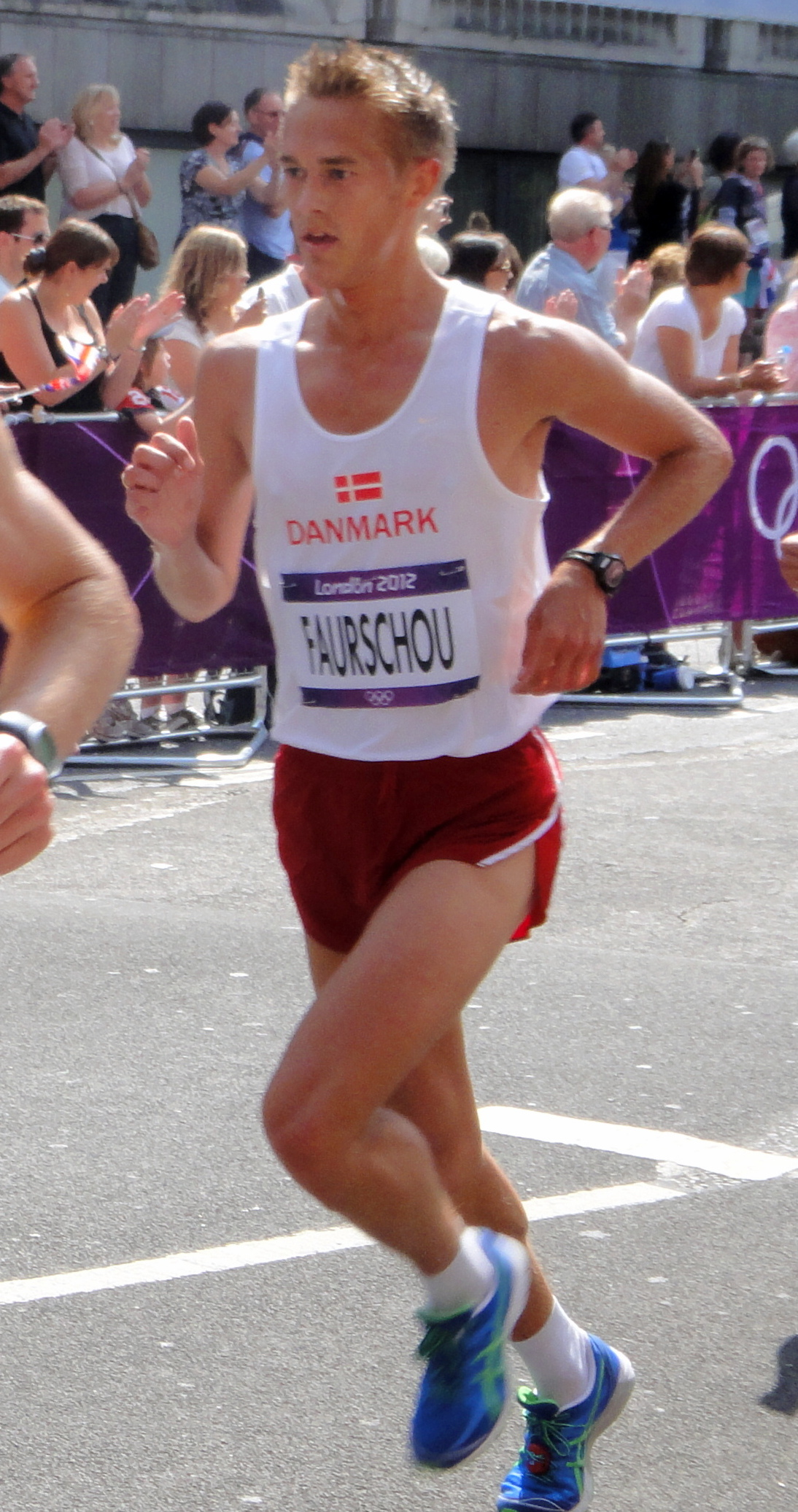
Jesper Faurschou in men's marathon

Men
Track & road events

Athlete	Event	Heat		Semifinal		Final	
Athlete	Event	Result	Rank	Result	Rank	Result	Rank
Andreas Bube	800 m	1:46.40	6	Did not advance			
Jesper Faurschou	Marathon	—N/a				2:18:44	41

Field events

Athlete	Event	Qualification		Final	
Athlete	Event	Distance	Position	Distance	Position
Kim Christensen	Shot put	19.13	28	Did not advance	

Women
Track & road events

Athlete	Event	Heat		Semifinal		Final	
Athlete	Event	Result	Rank	Result	Rank	Result	Rank
Sara Slott Petersen	400 m hurdles	56.01	6 q	56.21	6	did not advance	
Jessica Draskau	Marathon	—N/a				2:31:43	40

Field events

Athlete	Event	Qualification		Final	
Athlete	Event	Distance	Position	Distance	Position
Caroline Bonde Holm	Pole vault	NM	—	Did not advance	

== Badminton ==
The BWF World Ranking of 1 May 2012 was used for the qualifying for the badminton tournament. This gave Denmark the following quota places: 2 in men's singles, 1 in men's doubles, 1 in women's singles, 1 in women's doubles and 2 in mixed doubles. Nine players were selected on 14 May 2012.

Men

Athlete	Event	Group stage				Elimination	Quarterfinal	Semifinal	Final / BM	
Athlete	Event	Opposition Score	Opposition Score	Opposition Score	Rank	Opposition Score	Opposition Score	Opposition Score	Opposition Score	Rank
Peter Gade	Singles	Martins (POR); W 21–14, 21–8	—N/a		1 Q	Son W-h (KOR); W 21–9, 21–16	Chen L (CHN); L 16–21, 13–21	Did not advance		
Jan Østergaard Jørgensen	Singles	Zilberman (ISR); W 21–13, 21–12	Wong (SIN); W 21–17, 21–14	—N/a	1 Q	Lee H-i (KOR); L 17–21, 13–21	did not advance			
Mathias Boe; Carsten Mogensen	Doubles	James / Viljoen (RSA); W 21–6, 21–12	Ivanov / Sozonov (RUS); W 16–21, 21–19, 21–14	Chai B / Guo Zd (CHN); W 21–14, 21–19	1 Q	—N/a	Fang C-m / Lee S-m (TPE); W 21–16, 21–18	Jung J-s / Lee Y-d (KOR); W 17–21, 21–18, 22–20	Cai Y / Fu H (CHN); L 16–21, 15–21	2nd place, silver medalist(s)

Women

Athlete	Event	Group stage				Elimination	Quarterfinal	Semifinal	Final / BM	
Athlete	Event	Opposition Score	Opposition Score	Opposition Score	Rank	Opposition Score	Opposition Score	Opposition Score	Opposition Score	Rank
Tine Baun	Singles	Augustyn (POL); W 21–11, 21–6	Prokopenko (RUS); W 19–21, 21–15, 21–16	—N/a	1 Q	Sato (JPN) (12); W 14–15^{ret}	Nehwal (IND); L 15–21, 20–22	Did not advance		
Kamilla Rytter Juhl; Christinna Pedersen	Doubles	Maeda / Suetsuna (JPN); L 21–18, 14–21, 17–21	Poon L Y / Tse Y S (HKG); W 21–13, 14–21, 21–18	Tian Q / Zhao Yl (CHN); W 22–20, 21–12	1 Q	—N/a	Fujii / Kakiiwa (JPN); L 20–22, 10–21	Did not advance		

Mixed

Athlete	Event	Group stage				Quarterfinal	Semifinal	Final / BM	
Athlete	Event	Opposition Score	Opposition Score	Opposition Score	Rank	Opposition Score	Opposition Score	Opposition Score	Rank
Thomas Laybourn; Kamilla Rytter Juhl	Doubles	Diju / Gutta (IND); W 21–12, 21–16	Lee Y-d / Ha J-e (KOR); W 21–15, 21–11	Ahmad / Natsir (INA); L 22–24, 16–21	2 Q	Zhang N / Zhao Yl (CHN); L 13–21, 17–21	Did not advance		
Joachim Fischer Nielsen; Christinna Pedersen	Doubles	Ng / Gao (CAN); W 21–12, 21–11	Mateusiak / Zięba (POL); W 21–9, 14–21, 21–17	Ikeda / Shiota (JPN); W 21–11, 21–10	1 Q	Prapakamol / Thungthongkam (THA); W 21–15, 21–13	Zhang N / Zhao Yl (CHN); L 21–17, 17–21, 19–21	Ahmad / Natsir (INA); W 21–12, 21–12	3rd place, bronze medalist(s)

== Boxing ==
Denmark qualified in the following event with one qualifier.

Men

Athlete	Event	Round of 32	Round of 16	Quarterfinals	Semifinals	Final	
Athlete	Event	Opposition Result	Opposition Result	Opposition Result	Opposition Result	Opposition Result	Rank
Dennis Ceylan	Bantamweight	Nevin (IRL); L 6–21	Did not advance				

== Canoeing ==
=== Sprint ===
Denmark has qualified boats for the following events in the sprint discipline of the canoeing sport. No Danish canoeists competed in the slalom discipline.

Athlete	Event	Heats		Semifinals		Final	
Athlete	Event	Time	Rank	Time	Rank	Time	Rank
Kasper Bleibach	Men's K-1 200 m	36.610	3 Q	36.667	5 FB	37.802	9
René Holten Poulsen	Men's K-1 1000 m	3:30.284	1 Q	3:30.247	3 FA	3:29.483	4
Kim Wraae Knudsen; Emil Stær Simensen	Men's K-2 1000 m	3:17.020	5 Q	3:15.580	4 FB	3:12.820	9
Kasper Bleibach; Kim Wraae Knudsen; René Holten Poulsen; Emil Stær Simensen	Men's K-4 1000 m	3:05.134	3 Q	2:56.003	6 FA	2:56.542	5
Henriette Engel Hansen	Women's K-1 200 m	42.866	4 Q	42.821	7	did not advance	
Henriette Engel Hansen	Women's K-1 500 m	1:52.650	2 Q	1:51.929	2 FA	1:54.110	7

== Cycling ==
Denmark has qualified cyclists in all 4 disciplines in the cycling sport.

=== Road ===
Athlete	Event	Time	Rank
Lars Bak	Men's road race	5:46:37	71
Lars Bak	Men's time trial	54:33.21	14
Matti Breschel	Men's road race	5:46:37	42
Jakob Fuglsang	Men's road race	5:46:05	12
Jakob Fuglsang	Men's time trial	54:34.49	15
Nicki Sørensen	Men's road race	5:46:37	57

=== Track ===
Pursuit

Athlete	Event	Qualification		Semifinals		Final	
Athlete	Event	Time	Rank	Opponent Results	Rank	Opponent Results	Rank
Lasse Norman Hansen*; Michael Mørkøv; Mathias Møller Nielsen**; Rasmus Quaade; Casper von Folsach	Men's team pursuit	3:58.298	4 Q	Great Britain; 3:57.396	5	Spain; 4:02.671	5

Omnium

Athlete	Event	Flying lap		Points race		Elimination race	Individual pursuit		Scratch race	Time trial		Total points	Rank
Athlete	Event	Time	Rank	Points	Rank	Rank	Time	Rank	Rank	Time	Rank	Total points	Rank
Lasse Norman Hansen	Men's omnium	13.236	4	59	2	12	4:20.674	1	6	1:02.314	2	27	1st place, gold medalist(s)

=== Mountain biking ===
Athlete	Event	Time	Rank
Annika Langvad	Women's cross-country	DNS	

Annika Langvad has withdrawn from the Olympics due to broken ribs.

=== BMX ===
Athlete	Event	Seeding		Quarterfinal		Semifinal		Final	
Athlete	Event	Result	Rank	Points	Rank	Points	Rank	Result	Rank
Morten Therkildsen	Men's BMX	39.378	25	20	5	Did not advance			

== Equestrian ==
=== Dressage ===
Denmark has qualified one team and three individual quota places to the dressage discipline in the Equestrian sport after finishing in sixth place at the 2011 European Dressage Championship. No Danish riders compete in the two other disciplines.

Athlete	Horse	Event	Grand Prix		Grand Prix Special		Grand Prix Freestyle		Overall	
Athlete	Horse	Event	Score	Rank	Score	Rank	Technical	Artistic	Score	Rank
Anna Kasprzak	Donnperignon	Individual	75.289	12 Q	73.952	16 Q	74.179	78.714	76.446	18
Lisbeth Seierskilde	Raneur	Individual	69.863	32	Did not advance					
Anne Van Olst	Clearwater	Individual	71.322	23 Q	72.016	21	Did not advance			
Nathalie Zu Sayn-Wittgenstein	Digby	Individual	74.954	13 Q	75.857	9 Q	76.321	81.857	79.018	12
Anna Kasprzak; Anne Van Olst; Nathalie Zu Sayn-Wittgenstein	See above	Team	73.845	4 Q	73.846	4 Q	—N/a		73.846	4

== Gymnastics ==
=== Trampoline ===
Denmark qualified one male athlete in trampolining. No Danish gymnasts competed in the other two disciplines of the gymnastics sport.

Athlete	Event	Qualification		Final	
Athlete	Event	Score	Rank	Score	Rank
Peter Jensen	Men's	104.695	10	Did not advance	

== Handball ==
The men's team qualified for the Olympics by winning the 2012 European Men's Handball Championship. The women's team qualified through the World Qualification Tournament. This was the first ever Olympics where both the Danish men's and women's handball teams were present. The men's squad was announced on 29 May 2012 with the reserve determined one month later, and the women's squad was announced on 2 July 2012.

=== Men's tournament ===
Team roster

The following is the Denmark roster in the men's handball tournament of the 2012 Summer Olympics.

Head coaches: Ulrik Wilbek

No.	Pos.	Name	Date of birth (age)	Height	App.	Goals	Club
1	GK	Niklas Landin Jacobsen	19 December 1988 (aged 23)	2.00 m			(Denmark) Bjerringbro-Silkeborg
2	CB	Thomas Mogensen	30 January 1983 (aged 29)	1.87 m			(Germany) Flensburg-Handewitt
4	LB	Lasse Boesen	18 September 1979 (aged 32)	1.92 m			(Denmark) KIF Kolding
8	CB	Rasmus Lauge Schmidt	20 June 1991 (aged 21)	1.94 m			(Denmark) Bjerringbro-Silkeborg
10	LB	Nikolaj Markussen	1 August 1988 (aged 23)	2.12 m			(Spain) Atlético Madrid
11	LW	Anders Eggert Jensen	14 May 1982 (aged 30)	1.79 m			(Germany) Flensburg-Handewitt
13	CB	Bo Spellerberg	24 July 1979 (aged 33)	1.92 m			(Denmark) KIF Kolding
14	P	Michael V. Knudsen	4 September 1978 (aged 33)	1.92 m			(Germany) Flensburg-Handewitt
17	RW	Lasse Svan Hansen	31 August 1983 (aged 28)	1.87 m			(Germany) Flensburg-Handewitt
18	RW	Hans Lindberg	1 August 1981 (aged 30)	1.88 m			(Germany) HSV Hamburg
19	P	Rene Toft Hansen	1 November 1984 (aged 27)	2.00 m			(Denmark) AG København
20	GK	Marcus Cleverly	15 June 1981 (aged 31)	1.88 m			(Poland) Vive Targi Kielce
22	RB	Kasper Søndergaard Sarup	9 June 1981 (aged 31)	1.95 m			(Denmark) Skjern Håndbold
24	LB	Mikkel Hansen	22 October 1987 (aged 24)	1.96 m			(Denmark) AG København
26	LB	Kasper Nielsen	9 June 1975 (aged 37)	1.92 m			(Denmark) Bjerringbro-Silkeborg

Group play

Team	Pld	W	D	L	GF	GA	GD	Pts	Qualification
Croatia	5	5	0	0	150	109	+41	10	Quarter-finals
Denmark	5	4	0	1	124	129	−5	8	Quarter-finals
Spain	5	3	0	2	140	126	+14	6	Quarter-finals
Hungary	5	2	0	3	114	128	−14	4	Quarter-finals
Serbia	5	1	0	4	120	131	−11	2	
South Korea	5	0	0	5	115	140	−25	0	

29 July 2012; 21:15	Hungary	25 – 27	Denmark	Copper Box, London; Attendance: 5,000; Referees: Lazaar, Reveret (FRA)
29 July 2012; 21:15	Császár 8	(10–13)	Eggert 9	Copper Box, London; Attendance: 5,000; Referees: Lazaar, Reveret (FRA)
29 July 2012; 21:15	1× (yellow card) 7× (suspension)	Report	3× (yellow card) 5× (suspension)	Copper Box, London; Attendance: 5,000; Referees: Lazaar, Reveret (FRA)

31 July 2012; 19:30	Denmark	24 – 23	Spain	Copper Box, London; Attendance: 4,368; Referees: Krstić, Ljubić (SLO)
31 July 2012; 19:30	Hansen 8	(13–12)	three players 4	Copper Box, London; Attendance: 4,368; Referees: Krstić, Ljubić (SLO)
31 July 2012; 19:30	4× (yellow card) 6× (suspension)	Report	4× (yellow card) 1× (suspension)	Copper Box, London; Attendance: 4,368; Referees: Krstić, Ljubić (SLO)

2 August 2012; 19:30	Serbia	25 – 26	Denmark	Copper Box, London; Attendance: 4,504; Referees: Geipel, Helbig (GER)
2 August 2012; 19:30	Vujin 7	(11–13)	Hansen 7	Copper Box, London; Attendance: 4,504; Referees: Geipel, Helbig (GER)
2 August 2012; 19:30	3× (yellow card) 7× (suspension)	Report	2× (yellow card) 3× (suspension)	Copper Box, London; Attendance: 4,504; Referees: Geipel, Helbig (GER)

4 August 2012; 16:15	Croatia	32 – 21	Denmark	Copper Box, London; Attendance: 4,800; Referees: Lazaar, Reveret (FRA)
4 August 2012; 16:15	three players 5	(14–9)	Eggert Jensen, Lindberg 5	Copper Box, London; Attendance: 4,800; Referees: Lazaar, Reveret (FRA)
4 August 2012; 16:15	3× (yellow card) 2× (suspension)	Report	3× (yellow card) 3× (suspension)	Copper Box, London; Attendance: 4,800; Referees: Lazaar, Reveret (FRA)

6 August 2012; 14:30	Denmark	26 – 24	South Korea	Copper Box, London; Attendance: 4,546; Referees: Al-Nuaimi, Omar (UAE)
6 August 2012; 14:30	Eggert Jensen, Knudsen 6	(13–14)	Lee Jae-woo, Eom Hyo-won 6	Copper Box, London; Attendance: 4,546; Referees: Al-Nuaimi, Omar (UAE)
6 August 2012; 14:30	4× (yellow card) 2× (suspension)	Report	2× (yellow card) 1× (suspension)	Copper Box, London; Attendance: 4,546; Referees: Al-Nuaimi, Omar (UAE)

Quarter-final

8 August 2012; 18:00	Sweden	24 – 22	Denmark	Basketball Arena, London; Attendance: 9,494; Referees: Nachevski, Nikolov (MKD)
8 August 2012; 18:00	Doder 6	(11–9)	Lindberg 6	Basketball Arena, London; Attendance: 9,494; Referees: Nachevski, Nikolov (MKD)
8 August 2012; 18:00	4× (yellow card) 5× (suspension)	Report	4× (yellow card) 2× (suspension)	Basketball Arena, London; Attendance: 9,494; Referees: Nachevski, Nikolov (MKD)

=== Women's tournament ===
Team roster

The following is the Denmark roster in the women's handball tournament of the 2012 Summer Olympics.

Head coaches: Jan Pytlick

No.	Pos.	Name	Date of birth (age)	Height	App.	Goals	Club
2	P	Mette Melgaard	3 June 1980 (aged 32)	1.70 m			(Denmark) Randers HK
4	P	Susan Thorsgaard	13 October 1988 (aged 23)	1.88 m			(Denmark) FC Midtjylland
9	RB	Camilla Dalby	15 May 1988 (aged 24)	1.82 m			(Denmark) Randers HK
10	CB	Christina Krogshede	4 November 1981 (aged 30)	1.72 m			(Denmark) Frederiksberg IF
12	GK	Karin Mortensen	26 September 1977 (aged 34)	1.81 m			(Denmark) Frederiksberg IF
13	P	Marianne Bonde	25 June 1984 (aged 28)	1.84 m			(Denmark) Frederiksberg IF
15	LB	Pernille Larsen	26 September 1977 (aged 34)	1.84 m			(Denmark) Viborg HK
16	GK	Christina Pedersen	15 December 1982 (aged 29)	1.80 m			(Denmark) Frederiksberg IF
19	RB	Line Jørgensen	31 December 1989 (aged 22)	1.83 m			(Denmark) FC Midtjylland
22	LB	Trine Troelsen	2 May 1985 (aged 27)	1.72 m			(Denmark) FC Midtjylland
23	LW	Ann Grete Nørgaard	15 September 1983 (aged 28)	1.63 m			(Denmark) Team Tvis Holstebro
24	CB	Berit Kristensen	2 August 1983 (aged 28)	1.72 m			(Denmark) Randers HK
25	LB	Rikke Skov	7 September 1980 (aged 31)	1.81 m			(Denmark) Viborg HK
27	RB	Louise Burgaard	17 October 1992 (aged 19)	1.76 m			(Denmark) Team Tvis Holstebro

Group play

Team	Pld	W	D	L	GF	GA	GD	Pts	Qualification
France	5	4	1	0	125	103	+22	9	Quarter-finals
South Korea	5	3	1	1	136	130	+6	7	Quarter-finals
Spain	5	3	1	1	119	114	+5	7	Quarter-finals
Norway	5	2	1	2	118	120	−2	5	Quarter-finals
Denmark	5	1	0	4	113	121	−8	2	
Sweden	5	0	0	5	108	131	−23	0	

28 July 2012; 16:15	Denmark	21 – 18	Sweden	Copper Box, London; Attendance: 3,942; Referees: Nikolić, Stojković (SRB)
28 July 2012; 16:15	Skov 6	(8–10)	Gulldén 5	Copper Box, London; Attendance: 3,942; Referees: Nikolić, Stojković (SRB)
28 July 2012; 16:15	3× (yellow card) 4× (suspension)	Report	4× (yellow card) 3× (suspension)	Copper Box, London; Attendance: 3,942; Referees: Nikolić, Stojković (SRB)

30 July 2012; 11:15	South Korea	25 – 24	Denmark	Copper Box, London; Attendance: 4,393; Referees: Duţă, Florescu (ROU)
30 July 2012; 11:15	Jo Hyo-bi 5	(11–10)	Larsen 7	Copper Box, London; Attendance: 4,393; Referees: Duţă, Florescu (ROU)
30 July 2012; 11:15	3× (yellow card) 1× (suspension)	Report	3× (yellow card) 2× (suspension)	Copper Box, London; Attendance: 4,393; Referees: Duţă, Florescu (ROU)

1 August 2012; 19:30	Spain	24 – 21	Denmark	Copper Box, London; Attendance: 4,488; Referees: Geipel, Helbig (GER)
1 August 2012; 19:30	Mangué 7	(14–9)	Nørgaard 7	Copper Box, London; Attendance: 4,488; Referees: Geipel, Helbig (GER)
1 August 2012; 19:30	3× (yellow card) 3× (suspension) 1× (red card)	Report	3× (yellow card) 1× (suspension)	Copper Box, London; Attendance: 4,488; Referees: Geipel, Helbig (GER)

3 August 2012; 21:15	Denmark	23 – 24	Norway	Copper Box, London; Attendance: 4,720; Referees: Horáček, Novotný (CZE)
3 August 2012; 21:15	Nørgaard 9	(11–12)	Løke 6	Copper Box, London; Attendance: 4,720; Referees: Horáček, Novotný (CZE)
3 August 2012; 21:15	3× (yellow card) 2× (suspension)	Report	3× (yellow card)	Copper Box, London; Attendance: 4,720; Referees: Horáček, Novotný (CZE)

5 August 2012; 21:15	Denmark	24 – 30	France	Copper Box, London; Attendance: 4,616; Referees: Duţă, Florescu (ROU)
5 August 2012; 21:15	Nørgaard 10	(10–17)	Nijtam 6	Copper Box, London; Attendance: 4,616; Referees: Duţă, Florescu (ROU)
5 August 2012; 21:15	3× (yellow card) 2× (suspension)	Report	2× (yellow card) 1× (suspension)	Copper Box, London; Attendance: 4,616; Referees: Duţă, Florescu (ROU)

== Rowing ==
Denmark has qualified boats for the following events

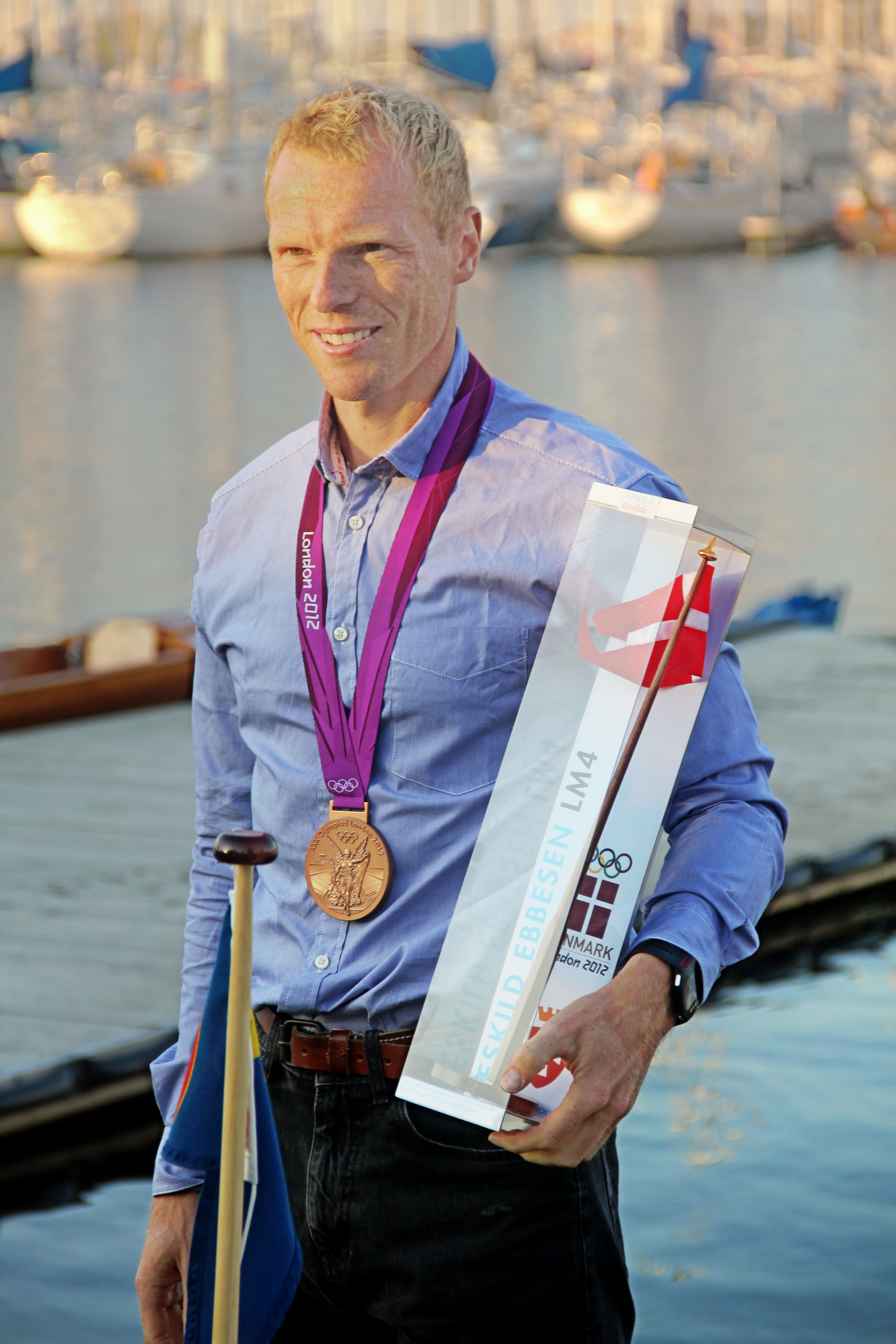
Five-time Olympian Eskild Ebbesen satisfied with his bronze medal in men's lightweight four.

Men

Athlete	Event	Heats		Repechage		Quarterfinals		Semifinals		Final	
Athlete	Event	Time	Rank	Time	Rank	Time	Rank	Time	Rank	Time	Rank
Henrik Stephansen	Single sculls	6:46.32	3 QF	Bye		6:55.95	4 SC/D	7:29.76	1 FC	7:19.62	13
Rasmus Quist Hansen; Mads Rasmussen	Lightweight double sculls	6:33.11	1 SA/B	Bye		—N/a		6:33.25	1 FA	6:37.17	1st place, gold medalist(s)
Jacob Barsøe; Eskild Ebbesen; Morten Jørgensen; Kasper Winther Jørgensen	Lightweight four	5:55.64	3 SA/B	Bye		—N/a		6:03.53	1 FA	6:03.16	3rd place, bronze medalist(s)

Women

Athlete	Event	Heats		Repechage		Quarterfinals		Semifinals		Final	
Athlete	Event	Time	Rank	Time	Rank	Time	Rank	Time	Rank	Time	Rank
Fie Udby Erichsen	Single sculls	7:29.37	2 QF	Bye		7:38.93	1 SA/B	7:44.33	1 FA	7:57.72	2nd place, silver medalist(s)
Anne Lolk; Juliane Elander Rasmussen	Lightweight double sculls	6:59.94	2 SA/B	Bye		—N/a		7:10.93	2 FA	7:15.53	4

Qualification Legend: FA=Final A (medal); FB=Final B (non-medal); FC=Final C (non-medal); FD=Final D (non-medal); FE=Final E (non-medal); FF=Final F (non-medal); SA/B=Semifinals A/B; SC/D=Semifinals C/D; SE/F=Semifinals E/F; QF=Quarterfinals; R=Repechage

== Sailing ==
Each NOC could only enter one boat at each event, and Denmark qualified to enter a boat in eight out of the ten events only missing Women's RS-X and Men's 470. Which means that Danish sailors competed in all eight Olympic boat types.

Men

Athlete	Event	Race											Net points	Final rank
Athlete	Event	1	2	3	4	5	6	7	8	9	10	M	Net points	Final rank
Sebastian Fleischer	RS:X	18	28	24	23	~~29~~	29	29	15	28	26	EL	220	29
Thorbjørn Schierup	Laser	36	16	~~24~~	8	23	16	5	23	24	18	EL	157	19
Jonas Høgh-Christensen	Finn	1	1	2	7	1	2	~~8~~	4	5	3	20	46	2nd place, silver medalist(s)
Michael Hestbæk; Claus Olesen	Star	12	11	13	~~14~~	13	7	6	3	14	10	EL	89	11

Women

Athlete	Event	Race											Net points	Final rank
Athlete	Event	1	2	3	4	5	6	7	8	9	10	M	Net points	Final rank
Anne-Marie Rindom	Laser Radial	17	19	8	22	12	7	~~27~~	23	11	11	EL	130	13
Henriette Koch; Lene Sommer	470	5	12	~~16~~	10	14	16	15	10	9	15	EL	106	16

Match racing

Athlete	Event	Round Robin											Rank	Knockouts			Rank
Athlete	Event	GBR	USA	RUS	NZL	NED	SWE	FRA	FIN	POR	AUS	ESP	Rank	Q-final	S-final	Final	Rank
Susanne Boidin; Tina Gramkov; Lotte Meldgaard	Elliott 6m	L	L	L	L	W	W	L	L	W	L	L	10	Did not advance			

The Danish boat originally lost their eleventh round robin race by seven seconds, but following a protest the result was annulled and the race resailed.

Open

Athlete	Event	Race																Net points	Final rank
Athlete	Event	1	2	3	4	5	6	7	8	9	10	11	12	13	14	15	M	Net points	Final rank
Peter Lang; Allan Nørregaard	49er	2	4	14	6	~~16~~	15	5	7	13	6	16	4	4	3	9	6	114	3rd place, bronze medalist(s)

== Shooting ==
Denmark have qualified for five places is shooting events; athletes in brackets secured the quota place.

Men

Athlete	Event	Qualification		Final	
Athlete	Event	Points	Rank	Points	Rank
Anders Golding	Skeet	122	2 Q	146	2nd place, silver medalist(s)
Torben Grimmel	50 m rifle prone	592	24	Did not advance	
Jesper Hansen	Skeet	113	26	Did not advance	

Women

Athlete	Event	Qualification		Final	
Athlete	Event	Points	Rank	Points	Rank
Stine Andersen	10 m air rifle	393	30	Did not advance	
Stine Nielsen	50 m rifle 3 positions	582	11	Did not advance	
Stine Nielsen	10 m air rifle	397	9	Did not advance	

== Swimming ==
Danish swimmers achieved qualifying standards in the following events before the games started (up to a maximum of two swimmers in each event at the Olympic Qualifying Time (OQT), and potentially one at the Olympic Selection Time (OST)): Pál Joensen competed under the Danish flag, although he originally played for the Faroe Islands.

Men

Athlete	Event	Heat		Semifinal		Final	
Athlete	Event	Time	Rank	Time	Rank	Time	Rank
Mads Glæsner	200 m freestyle	DNS		Did not advance			
Mads Glæsner	400 m freestyle	3:48.27	12	—N/a		Did not advance	
Mathias Gydesen	100 m backstroke	55.31	30	Did not advance			
Pál Joensen	400 m freestyle	3:47.36	10	—N/a		Did not advance	
Pál Joensen	1500 m freestyle	15:18.42	17	—N/a		Did not advance	
Mads Glæsner; Pál Joensen; Anders Lie; Daniel Skaaning	4 × 200 m freestyle relay	7:15.04	13	—N/a		Did not advance	

Women

Athlete	Event	Heat		Semifinal		Final	
Athlete	Event	Time	Rank	Time	Rank	Time	Rank
Pernille Blume	50 m freestyle	25.54	=24	Did not advance			
Pernille Blume	100 m freestyle	55.04	19	Did not advance			
Pernille Blume	200 m freestyle	2:00.91	24	Did not advance			
Lotte Friis	400 m freestyle	4:04.22	5 Q	—N/a		4:03.98	4
Lotte Friis	800 m freestyle	8:21.89	2 Q	—N/a		8:23.86	5
Mie Nielsen	100 m backstroke	1:00.38	17	Did not advance			
Mie Nielsen	200 m backstroke	2:13.89	28	did not advance			
Jeanette Ottesen	50 m freestyle	24.85	=7 Q	24.99	12	Did not advance	
Jeanette Ottesen	100 m freestyle	53.51	3 Q	53.77	=5 Q	53.75	7
Jeanette Ottesen	100 m butterfly	57.64	4 Q	57.25	3 Q	57.35	6
Rikke Møller Pedersen	100 m breaststroke	1:07.23	9 Q	1:06.82	6 Q	1:07.55	8
Rikke Møller Pedersen	200 m breaststroke	2:22.69	2 Q	2:22.23	2 Q	2:21.65	4
Pernille Blume; Lotte Friis; Mie Nielsen; Jeanette Ottesen	4 × 100 m freestyle relay	3:38.09	6 Q	—N/a		3:37.45	6
Pernille Blume; Mie Nielsen; Jeanette Ottesen; Rikke Møller Pedersen	4 × 100 m medley relay	3:58.35	3 Q	—N/a		3:57.76	7

== Table tennis ==
Three Danish athletes qualified for the table tennis event. In the men's singles, Michael Maze qualified by virtue of his ranking, while Allan Bentsen qualified through the final qualification tournament. Mie Skov qualified for the women's singles event after her performance at the European qualification tournament.

Men

Athlete	Event	Preliminary round	Round 1	Round 2	Round 3	Round 4	Quarterfinals	Semifinals	Final / BM	
Athlete	Event	Opposition Result	Opposition Result	Opposition Result	Opposition Result	Opposition Result	Opposition Result	Opposition Result	Opposition Result	Rank
Allan Bentsen	Men's singles	Bye	Zwickl (HUN); L 1–4	Did not advance						
Michael Maze	Men's singles	Bye			Kreanga (GRE); W 4–1	Mizutani (JPN); W 4–0	Ovtcharov (GER); L 3–4	Did not advance		
Mie Skov	Women's singles	Bye	El-Dawlatly (EGY); W 4–0	Partyka (POL); L 3–4	Did not advance					

== Tennis ==
Athlete	Event	Round of 64	Round of 32	Round of 16	Quarterfinals	Semifinals	Final / BM	
Athlete	Event	Opposition Score	Opposition Score	Opposition Score	Opposition Score	Opposition Score	Opposition Score	Rank
Caroline Wozniacki	Women's singles	Keothavong (GBR); W 4–6, 6–3, 6–2	Wickmayer (BEL); W 6–4, 3–6, 6–3	Hantuchová (SVK); W 6–4, 6–2	S. Williams (USA); L 0–6, 3–6	Did not advance		

== Triathlon ==
Denmark has qualified the following athletes.

Athlete	Event	Swim (1.5 km)	Trans 1	Bike (40 km)	Trans 2	Run (10 km)	Total Time	Rank
Helle Frederiksen	Women's	19:31	0:45	1:07:11	0:33	35:10	2:03:10	27
Line Jensen	Women's	18:21	0:43	1:06:34	0:32	36:37	2:02:47	23

== Wrestling ==
Denmark has qualified in the following events.

Key

- VT – Victory by Fall.
- PP – Decision by Points – the loser with technical points.
- PO – Decision by Points – the loser without technical points.

Men's Greco-Roman

Athlete	Event	Qualification	Round of 16	Quarterfinal	Semifinal	Repechage 1	Repechage 2	Final / BM	
Athlete	Event	Opposition Result	Opposition Result	Opposition Result	Opposition Result	Opposition Result	Opposition Result	Opposition Result	Rank
Håkan Nyblom	−55 kg	Bye	Fajari (MAR); W 3–0 ^{PO}	Hasegawa (JPN); W 3–0 ^{PO}	Sourian (IRI); L 0–3 ^{PO}	Bye		Módos (HUN); L 1–3 ^{PP}	5
Mark Madsen	−74 kg	Bye	Vlasov (RUS); L 1–3 ^{PP}	Did not advance		Bye	Guénot (FRA); W 3–1 ^{PP}	Kazakevič (LTU); L 0–3 ^{PO}	5
