= Indonesia at the 2012 Summer Olympics =

- IOC code: INA
- NOC: Indonesian Olympic Committee
- Website: www.nocindonesia.or.id (in Indonesian)

in London
- Competitors: 22 in 8 sports
- Flag bearer: I Gede Siman Sudartawa
- Officials: Erick Thohir (Chief de Mission)
- Medals Ranked 60th: Gold 0 Silver 2 Bronze 1 Total 3

Summer Olympics appearances (overview)
- 1952; 1956; 1960; 1964; 1968; 1972; 1976; 1980; 1984; 1988; 1992; 1996; 2000; 2004; 2008; 2012; 2016; 2020; 2024

Indonesia competed at the 2012 Summer Olympics in London, United Kingdom from July 27 to August 12, 2012. This was the nation's fourteenth appearance at the Olympics, having not competed at the 1964 Summer Olympics in Tokyo and the 1980 Summer Olympics in Moscow because of the United States boycott.

The National Sports Committee of Indonesia (Indonesian: Komite Olahraga Nasional Indonesia, KONI) sent the nation's smallest delegation to the Games since 1984. A total of 22 athletes, 13 men and 9 women, competed in 8 sports. Three athletes received their spots in athletics and swimming by wild card entries. Other Indonesian athletes won their spots by participating in various qualifying matches around the world. Badminton player and former Olympic gold medalist Taufik Hidayat, who competed at his fourth Olympic games, was the oldest and most experienced athlete of the team. Backstroke swimmer I Gede Siman Sudartawa, the youngest male athlete of the team, was Indonesia's flag bearer at the opening ceremony.

Indonesia, however, failed to win an Olympic gold medal for the first time since 1992, leaving London with only a silver and a bronze medal. Weightlifters Eko Yuli Irawan and Triyatno managed to repeat their Olympic medals from Beijing.

Indonesia also left the Olympic Games with a controversy, surrounding the athletes' sporting performance. Badminton doubles pair Meiliana Jauhari and Greysia Polii were among the eight athletes who disqualified from the tournament, after being found guilty of "not using best efforts" and "conducting oneself in a manner that is clearly abusive or detrimental to the sport" by playing to lose matches in order to manipulate the draw for the knockout stage.

Originally, Indonesia won two medals: one silver and one bronze in weightlifting. 53 kg-weightlifter Citra Febrianti originally finished fourth, but was promoted to second after gold medallist Zulfiya Chinshanlo and bronze medallist Cristina Iovu were both disqualified., gaining herself a silver medal.

== Medalists ==
| Medal | Name | Sport | Event | Date |
|---|---|---|---|---|
| Silver | Citra Febrianti | Weightlifting | Women's 53 kg | 29 July |
| Silver | Triyatno | Weightlifting | Men's 69 kg | 31 July |
| Bronze | Eko Yuli Irawan | Weightlifting | Men's 62 kg | 30 July |

Medals by sport
| Sport | 1st place, gold medalist(s) | 2nd place, silver medalist(s) | 3rd place, bronze medalist(s) | Total |
| Weightlifting | 0 | 2 | 1 | 3 |
| Total | 0 | 2 | 1 | 3 |

Medals by gender
| Gender | 1st place, gold medalist(s) | 2nd place, silver medalist(s) | 3rd place, bronze medalist(s) | Total |
| Female | 0 | 1 | 0 | 1 |
| Male | 0 | 1 | 1 | 2 |
| Mixed | 0 | 0 | 0 | 0 |
| Total | 0 | 2 | 1 | 3 |

Medals by date
| Date | 1st place, gold medalist(s) | 2nd place, silver medalist(s) | 3rd place, bronze medalist(s) | Total |
| 29 July | 0 | 1 | 0 | 1 |
| 30 July | 0 | 0 | 1 | 1 |
| 31 July | 0 | 1 | 0 | 1 |
| Total | 0 | 2 | 1 | 3 |

== Competitors ==
The following is the list of number of competitors participating in the Games:

| Sport | Men | Women | Total |
|---|---|---|---|
| Archery | 0 | 1 | 1 |
| Athletics | 1 | 1 | 2 |
| Badminton | 5 | 4 | 9 |
| Fencing | 0 | 1 | 1 |
| Judo | 1 | 0 | 1 |
| Shooting | 0 | 1 | 1 |
| Swimming | 1 | 0 | 1 |
| Weightlifting | 5 | 1 | 6 |
| Total | 13 | 9 | 22 |

== Archery ==
| Athlete | Event | Ranking round | | Round of 64 | Round of 32 | Round of 16 | Quarterfinals | Semifinals | Final / BM | |
| Athlete | Event | Score | Seed | Opposition Score | Opposition Score | Opposition Score | Opposition Score | Opposition Score | Opposition Score | Rank |
|---|---|---|---|---|---|---|---|---|---|---|
| Ika Yuliana Rochmawati | Women's individual | 638 | 40 | Fang Yt (CHN) (25); W 6–4 | Oliver (GBR) (57); W 7–1 | Perova (RUS) (9); L 5–6 | Did not advance | | | |

== Athletics ==
Key

- Note–Ranks given for track events are within the athlete's heat only
- Q = Qualified for the next round
- q = Qualified for the next round as a fastest loser or, in field events, by position without achieving the qualifying target
- NR = National record
- N/A = Round not applicable for the event
- Bye = Athlete not required to compete in round

Men

| Athlete | Event | Heat | | Quarterfinal | | Semifinal | | Final | |
| Athlete | Event | Result | Rank | Result | Rank | Result | Rank | Result | Rank |
|---|---|---|---|---|---|---|---|---|---|
| Fernando Lumain | 100 m | 10.80 | 2 Q | 10.90 | 8 | Did not advance | | | |

Women

| Athlete | Event | Final | |
| Athlete | Event | Result | Rank |
|---|---|---|---|
| Triyaningsih | Marathon | 2:41:15 | 84 |

== Badminton ==
Men

| Athlete | Event | Group Stage | | | | Elimination | Quarterfinal | Semifinal | Final / BM | |
| Athlete | Event | Opposition Score | Opposition Score | Opposition Score | Rank | Opposition Score | Opposition Score | Opposition Score | Opposition Score | Rank |
|---|---|---|---|---|---|---|---|---|---|---|
| Taufik Hidayat | Singles | Koukal (CZE); W 21–8, 21–8 | Abián (ESP); W 22–20, 21–11 | —N/a | 1 Q | Lin (CHN); L 9–21, 12–21 | Did not advance | | | |
| Simon Santoso | Singles | Must (EST); W 21–12, 21–8 | Lahnsteiner (AUT); W 21–11, 21–7 | —N/a | 1 Q | Lee (MAS); L 12–21, 8–21 | Did not advance | | | |
| Mohammad Ahsan; Bona Septano | Doubles | Isara / Jongjit (THA); L 11–21, 16–21 | Cwalina / Łogosz (POL); W 21–0, 21–0 | Ko / Yoo (KOR); W 24–22, 21–12 | 2 Q | —N/a | Jung / Lee (KOR); L 12–21, 16–21 | Did not advance | | |

Women

| Athlete | Event | Group Stage | | | | Elimination | Quarterfinal | Semifinal | Final / BM | |
| Athlete | Event | Opposition Score | Opposition Score | Opposition Score | Rank | Opposition Score | Opposition Score | Opposition Score | Opposition Score | Rank |
|---|---|---|---|---|---|---|---|---|---|---|
| Adrianti Firdasari | Singles | Nedelcheva (BUL); W 21–10, 21–15 | Zaitsava (BLR); W 21–10, 16–21, 21–14 | —N/a | 1 Q | Wang (CHN); L 15–21, 8–21 | Did not advance | | | |
| Meiliana Jauhari; Greysia Polii | Doubles | Choo / Veeran (AUS); W 21–11, 20–22, 21–7 | Edwards / Viljoen (RSA); W 21-18, 21-10 | Ha / Kim (KOR); L 21–18, 14–21, 12–21 | 2 Q | Disqualified – match fixing | | | | |

Mixed

| Athlete | Event | Group Stage | | | | Quarterfinal | Semifinal | Final / BM | |
| Athlete | Event | Opposition Score | Opposition Score | Opposition Score | Rank | Opposition Score | Opposition Score | Opposition Score | Rank |
|---|---|---|---|---|---|---|---|---|---|
| Tontowi Ahmad; Liliyana Natsir | Doubles | Diju / Gutta (IND); W 21–16, 21–12 | Lee / Ha (KOR); W 21–19, 21–12 | Laybourn / Rytter Juhl (DEN); W 24–22, 21–16 | 1 Q | Fuchs / Michels (GER); W 21–15, 21–9 | Xu / Ma (CHN); L 23–21, 18–21, 13–21 | Nielsen / Pedersen (DEN); L 12–21, 12–21 | 4 |

== Fencing ==
Indonesia has qualified 1 fencer.

Women

| Athlete | Event | Round of 32 | Round of 16 | Quarterfinal | Semifinal | Final / BM | |
| Athlete | Event | Opposition Score | Opposition Score | Opposition Score | Opposition Score | Opposition Score | Rank |
|---|---|---|---|---|---|---|---|
| Diah Permatasari | Individual sabre | Zagunis (USA); L 7–15 | Did not advance | | | | |

== Judo ==
Indonesia has qualified 1 judoka

| Athlete | Event | Round of 32 | Round of 16 | Quarterfinals | Semifinals | Repechage | Final / BM | |
| Athlete | Event | Opposition Result | Opposition Result | Opposition Result | Opposition Result | Opposition Result | Opposition Result | Rank |
|---|---|---|---|---|---|---|---|---|
| Putu Wiradamungga | Men's −81 kg | Csoknyai (HUN); L 0001–0200 | Did not advance | | | | | |

== Shooting ==
Indonesia have qualified the following shooters.

Women

| Athlete | Event | Qualification | | Final | |
| Athlete | Event | Points | Rank | Points | Rank |
|---|---|---|---|---|---|
| Diaz Kusumawardani | 10 m air rifle | 382 | 55 | Did not advance | |

== Swimming ==
Indonesian swimmers have so far achieved qualifying standards in the following events (up to a maximum of 2 swimmers in each event at the Olympic Qualifying Time (OQT), and 1 at the Olympic Selection Time (OST)):

Men

| Athlete | Event | Heat | | Semifinal | | Final | |
| Athlete | Event | Time | Rank | Time | Rank | Time | Rank |
|---|---|---|---|---|---|---|---|
| I Gede Siman Sudartawa | 100 m backstroke | 55.99 | 39 | Did not advance | | | |

== Weightlifting ==
Indonesia has qualified 5 men and 1 woman.

Men

| Athlete | Event | Snatch | | Clean & Jerk | | Total | Rank |
| Athlete | Event | Result | Rank | Result | Rank | Total | Rank |
|---|---|---|---|---|---|---|---|
| Jadi Setiadi | −56 kg | 127 | 3 | 150 | 7 | 277 | 4 |
| Eko Yuli Irawan | −62 kg | 145 | 2 | 172 | 4 | 317 | 3rd place, bronze medalist(s) |
| Muhamad Hasbi | −62 kg | 138 | 6 | 163 | 8 | 301 | 7 |
| Triyatno | −69 kg | 145 | 9 | 188 | 1 | 333 | 2nd place, silver medalist(s) |
| Deni | −69 kg | 140 | 13 | 171 | 12 | 311 | 9 |

Women

| Athlete | Event | Snatch | | Clean & Jerk | | Total | Rank |
| Athlete | Event | Result | Rank | Result | Rank | Total | Rank |
|---|---|---|---|---|---|---|---|
| Citra Febrianti | −53 kg | 91 | 5 | 115 | 4 | 206 | 2nd place, silver medalist(s) |

== See also ==
- 2012 Olympic Games
- 2012 Paralympic Games
- Indonesia at the Olympics
- Indonesia at the Paralympics
- Indonesia at the 2012 Summer Paralympics
