= India at the 2012 Summer Olympics =

- IOC code: IND
- NOC: Indian Olympic Association
- Website: olympic.ind.in

in London
- Competitors: 83 in 13 sports
- Flag bearers: Sushil Kumar (opening); Mary Kom (closing)
- Medals Ranked 57th: Gold 0 Silver 2 Bronze 4 Total 6

Summer Olympics appearances (overview)
- 1900; 1904–1912; 1920; 1924; 1928; 1932; 1936; 1948; 1952; 1956; 1960; 1964; 1968; 1972; 1976; 1980; 1984; 1988; 1992; 1996; 2000; 2004; 2008; 2012; 2016; 2020; 2024

India competed at the 2012 Summer Olympics in London, from 27 July to 12 August 2012. A total of 83 athletes, 60 men and 23 women, competed in 13 sports. Men's field hockey was the only team-based sport in which India was represented in these Olympic Games. India also marked its Olympic return in weightlifting, after the International Weightlifting Federation imposed a two-year suspension for the nation's athletes because of a doping scandal in Beijing.

The Indian team featured several Olympic medalists from Beijing, including rifle shooter and Olympic gold medalist Abhinav Bindra, who failed to advance into the final rounds of his event in London. Wrestler and Olympic bronze medalist Sushil Kumar, chosen by the Indian Olympic Association to be the nation's flag bearer at the opening ceremony, managed to claim another medal by winning silver in the men's freestyle wrestling.

This was India's 2nd most successful Olympics in terms of total medals, they won a total of 6 medals (2 silver and 4 bronze), doubling the nation's previous record (3 medals at the 2008 Beijing Olympics). Two medals were awarded to athletes in shooting and wrestling. Female Indian athletes won two Olympic medals in one Games for the first time. The two athletes were badminton player and world junior champion Saina Nehwal, who became the first Indian athlete to win an Olympic bronze medal in the women's singles, and boxer Mary Kom, who lost to Great Britain's Nicola Adams in the semi-final match and received a bronze medal in the first ever women's flyweight event.

== Medalists ==
Medal	Name	Sport	Event	Date
Silver	Vijay Kumar	Shooting	Men's 25 m rapid fire pistol	3 August
Silver	Sushil Kumar	Wrestling	Men's freestyle 66 kg	12 August
Bronze	Gagan Narang	Shooting	Men's 10 m air rifle	30 July
Bronze	Saina Nehwal	Badminton	Women's singles	4 August
Bronze	Mary Kom	Boxing	Women's flyweight	8 August
Bronze	Yogeshwar Dutt	Wrestling	Men's freestyle 60 kg	11 August

Medals by sport
Sport	1st place, gold medalist(s)	2nd place, silver medalist(s)	3rd place, bronze medalist(s)	Total
Shooting	0	1	1	2
Wrestling	0	1	1	2
Badminton	0	0	1	1
Boxing	0	0	1	1
Total	0	2	4	6

Medals by gender
Gender	1st place, gold medalist(s)	2nd place, silver medalist(s)	3rd place, bronze medalist(s)	Total
Male	0	2	2	4
Female	0	0	2	2
Total	0	2	4	6

== Competitors ==
Sport	Men	Women	Total	Event
Archery	3	3	6	4
Athletics	8	6	14	11
Badminton	2	3	5	4
Boxing	7	1	8	8
Field hockey	18	0	18	1
Judo	0	1	1	1
Rowing	3	0	3	2
Shooting	7	4	11	10
Swimming	1	0	1	1
Table tennis	1	1	2	2
Tennis	5	2	7	4
Weightlifting	1	1	2	2
Wrestling	4	1	5	5
Total	60	23	83	55

== Archery ==
Six Indian archers qualified for the London Olympics – 3 in women's recurve and 3 in men's recurve.

Men

Athlete	Event	Ranking round		Round of 64	Round of 32	Round of 16	Quarterfinals	Semifinals	Final / BM	
Athlete	Event	Score	Seed	Opposition Score	Opposition Score	Opposition Score	Opposition Score	Opposition Score	Opposition Score	Rank
Jayanta Talukdar	Individual	650	53	Wukie (USA) (12); L 0–6	did not advance					
Rahul Banerjee	Individual	655	46	Gantögs (MGL) (19); W 6–0	Dobrowolski (POL) (14); L 3–7	did not advance				
Tarundeep Rai	Individual	664	31	Stevens (CUB) (34); W 6–5	Kim B-M (KOR) (2); L 2–6	did not advance				
Jayanta Talukdar; Rahul Banerjee; Tarundeep Rai	Team	1969	12	—N/a		Japan (5); L 214 (27)–214 (29)	did not advance			

Women

Athlete	Event	Ranking round		Round of 64	Round of 32	Round of 16	Quarterfinals	Semifinals	Final / BM	
Athlete	Event	Score	Seed	Opposition Score	Opposition Score	Opposition Score	Opposition Score	Opposition Score	Opposition Score	Rank
Laishram Bombayla Devi	Individual	651	22	Psarra (GRE) (43); W 6–4	Román (MEX) (11); L 2–6	did not advance				
Deepika Kumari	Individual	662	8	Oliver (GBR) (57); L 2–6	did not advance					
Chekrovolu Swuro	Individual	625	50	Nichols (USA) (15); L 5–6	did not advance					
Laishram Bombayla Devi; Deepika Kumari; Chekrovolu Swuro	Team	1938	9	—N/a		Denmark (8); L 210–211	did not advance			

== Athletics ==
Fourteen Indian athletes qualified for the Athletics events (up to a maximum of 3 athletes in each event at the 'A' Standard, and 1 at the 'B' Standard).:

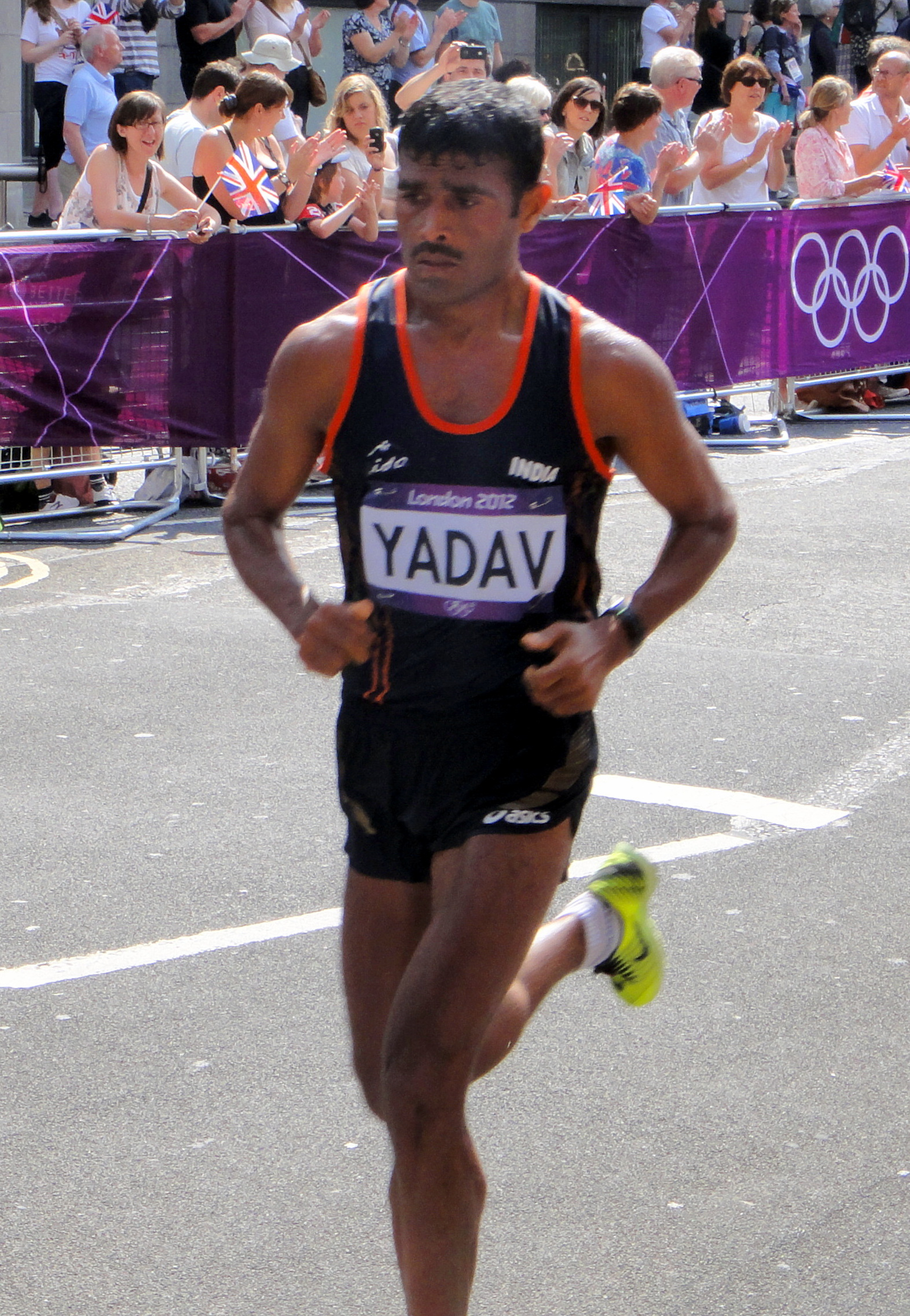
Ram Singh Yadav finished seventy-eighth in men's marathon.

Men
Track & road events

Athlete	Event	Final	
Athlete	Event	Result	Rank
Basanta Bahadur Rana	50 km walk	3:56:48 NR	36
Baljinder Singh	20 km walk	1:25:39	43
Gurmeet Singh	20 km walk	1:23:34	33
Irfan Kolothum Thodi	20 km walk	1:20:21 NR	10
Ram Singh Yadav	Marathon	2:30:06	78

Field events

Athlete	Event	Qualification		Final	
Athlete	Event	Distance	Position	Distance	Position
Vikas Gowda	Discus throw	65.20	5 Q	64.79	8
Om Prakash Karhana	Shot put	19.86	19	did not advance	
Renjith Maheshwary	Triple jump	NM	—	did not advance	

Women
Track & road events

Athlete	Event	Heat		Semifinal		Final	
Athlete	Event	Result	Rank	Result	Rank	Result	Rank
Tintu Luka	800 m	2:01.75	3 Q	1:59.69 SB	6	did not advance	
Sudha Singh	3000 m steeplechase	9:48.86	13	did not advance			

Field events

Athlete	Event	Qualification		Final	
Athlete	Event	Distance	Position	Distance	Position
Mayookha Johny	Triple jump	13.77	22	did not advance	
Sahana Kumari	High jump	1.80	29	did not advance	
Seema Antil	Discus throw	61.91	13	did not advance	
Krishna Poonia	Discus throw	63.54	8 Q	63.62	6

Key

- Note–Ranks given for track events are within the athlete's heat only
- Q = Qualified for the next round
- q = Qualified for the next round as a fastest loser or, in field events, by position without achieving the qualifying target
- NR = National record
- SB = Seasonal best
- N/A = Round not applicable for the event
- Bye = Athlete not required to compete in round

== Badminton ==
5 Indian badminton players qualified for the London Olympics.

Athlete	Event	Group stage				Elimination	Quarterfinal	Semifinal	Final / BM	
Athlete	Event	Opposition Score	Opposition Score	Opposition Score	Rank	Opposition Score	Opposition Score	Opposition Score	Opposition Score	Rank
Parupalli Kashyap	Men's singles	Y Tan (BEL); W 21–14, 21–12	Nguyễn T M (VIE); W 21–9, 21–14	—N/a	1 Q	N Karunaratne (SRI); W 21–14, 15–21, 21–9	Lee C W (MAS); L 19–21, 11–21	did not advance		
Saina Nehwal	Women's singles	S Jaquet (SUI); W 21–9, 21–4	L Tan (BEL); W 21–4, 21–14	—N/a	1 Q	Yao J (NED); W 21–14, 21–16	T Baun (DEN); W 21–15, 22–20	Wang YH (CHN); L 13–21, 13–21	Wang X (CHN); W 18–21, 0–1^{ret}	3rd place, bronze medalist(s)
Jwala Gutta; Ashwini Ponnappa	Women's doubles	M Fujii / R Kakiiwa (JPN); L 21–16, 21–18	Cheng W-h / Chien Y-c (TPE); W 25–23, 16–21, 21–18	S M Sari / Yao L (SIN); W 21–16, 21–15	3	did not advance				
Valiyaveetil Diju; Jwala Gutta	Mixed doubles	T Ahmad / L Natsir (INA); L 16–21, 12–21	T Laybourn / K Rytter Juhl (DEN); L 12–21, 16–21	Lee Y-d / Ha J-e (KOR); L 15–21, 15–21	4	did not advance				

== Boxing ==
Eight Indian boxers qualified for the London Olympics.

Men

Athlete	Event	Round of 32	Round of 16	Quarterfinals	Semifinals	Final	
Athlete	Event	Opposition Result	Opposition Result	Opposition Result	Opposition Result	Opposition Result	Rank
Devendro Singh	Light flyweight	Molina (HON); W RSC	Serdamba (MGL); W 16–11	Barnes (IRL); L 18–23	did not advance		
Shiva Thapa	Bantamweight	Valdez (MEX); L 9–14	did not advance				
Jai Bhagwan	Lightweight	Allisop (SEY); W 18–8	Zhailaouv (KAZ); L 8–16	did not advance			
Manoj Kumar	Light welterweight	Hudayberdiyev (TKM); W 13–7	Stalker (GBR); L 16–20	did not advance			
Vikas Krishan Yadav	Welterweight	Bye	Spence (USA); L 13–15	did not advance			
Vijender Singh	Middleweight	Suzhanov (KAZ); W 14–10	Gausha (USA); W 16–15	Atoev (UZB); L 13–17	did not advance		
Sumit Sangwan	Light heavyweight	Falcão (BRA); L 14–15	did not advance				

Women

Athlete	Event	Round of 16	Quarterfinals	Semifinals	Final	
Athlete	Event	Opposition Result	Opposition Result	Opposition Result	Opposition Result	Rank
Mary Kom	Flyweight	Michalczuk (POL); W 19–14	Rahali (TUN); W 15–6	Adams (GBR); L 6–11	Did not advance	3rd place, bronze medalist(s)

== Field hockey ==
The Indian national Hockey team, on 26 February 2012, had qualified for the 2012 Summer Olympics after winning the qualifying tournament against France with a score of 8–1.

India was placed in Pool B of the men's tournament.

=== Men's tournament ===
Roster

The following was the Indian roster in the men's field hockey tournament of the 2012 Summer Olympics.

Head Coach: Michael Nobbs

1. Ignace Tirkey
4. Sandeep Singh
6. Bharat Chettri (C, GK)
7. Manpreet Singh
8. Sardara Singh (VC)
10. Dharamvir Singh
12. V. R. Raghunath
13. Gurbaj Singh
14. Tushar Khandker
15. S. K. Uthappa
16. P. R. Shreejesh (GK)
17. Danish Mujtaba
18. Shivendra Singh
21. Gurwinder Singh Chandi
24. Sowmarpet Sunil
26. Birendra Lakra

Reserves:

- Sarvanjit Singh
- Kothajit Singh

Group play

All times are British Summer Time, (UTC+1).

Pos	Team	Pld	W	D	L	GF	GA	GD	Pts	Qualification
1	Netherlands	5	5	0	0	18	7	+11	15	Semi-finals
2	Germany	5	3	1	1	14	11	+3	10	Semi-finals
3	Belgium	5	2	1	2	8	7	+1	7	Fifth place game
4	South Korea	5	2	0	3	9	8	+1	6	Seventh place game
5	New Zealand	5	1	2	2	10	14	−4	5	Ninth place game
6	India	5	0	0	5	6	18	−12	0	Eleventh place game

Source: FIH

30 July 2012
16:00

Netherlands	3–2	India
Van der Horst 20'; Weusthof 29'; Van der Weerden 51'	Report	D. Singh 45'; Sh. Singh 48'

Umpires:
Tim Pullman (AUS)
Nathan Stagno (GIB)

1 August 2012
13:45

New Zealand	3–1	India
Hayward 13'; Burrows 24'; Wilson 29'	Report	San. Singh 2'

Umpires:
Ged Curran (GBR)
Colin Hutchinson (IRL)

3 August 2012
13:45

Germany	5–2	India
Fuchs 7', 16', 36'; Korn 24'; Wesley 34'	Report	Raghunath 13'; Khandker 62'

Umpires:
Kim Hong-lae (KOR)
Gary Simmonds (RSA)

5 August 2012
13:15

India	1–4	South Korea
Chandi 10'	Report	Jang 6'; Nam 59', 70'; Seo 68'

Umpires:
Simon Taylor (NZL)
Gary Simmonds (RSA)

7 August 2012
16:00

India	0–3	Belgium
	Report	Dekeyser 15'; Boccard 47'; Boon 67'

Umpires:
Kim Hong-lae (KOR)
Nigel Iggo (NZL)

11th–12th Place

11 August 2012
08:30

South Africa	3–2	India
Cronje 8'; Drummond 34'; Norris-Jones 65'	Report	San. Singh 14'; D. Singh 67'

Umpires:
Kim Hong-lae (KOR)
German Montes de Oca (ARG)

This was the worst show ever by India at the Olympics.

== Judo ==
There was only one Indian judoka at the London Olympics.

Athlete	Event	Round of 32	Round of 16	Quarterfinals	Semifinals	Repechage	Final / BM	
Athlete	Event	Opposition Result	Opposition Result	Opposition Result	Opposition Result	Opposition Result	Opposition Result	Rank
Garima Chaudhary	Women's −63 kg	Ueno (JPN); L 0000–0100	did not advance					

== Rowing ==
India had qualified the following boats.

Men

Athlete	Event	Heats		Repechage		Quarterfinals		Semifinals		Finals	
Athlete	Event	Time	Rank	Time	Rank	Time	Rank	Time	Rank	Time	Rank
Sawarn Singh	Single sculls	6:54.04	4 R	7:00:49	1 Q	7:11.59	4 SC/D	7:36.25	2 FC	7:29.66	16
Sandeep Kumar; Manjeet Singh	Lightweight double sculls	6:56.60	4 R	6:54.20	6 SC/D	—N/a		7:19.31	4 FD	7:08.39	19

Qualification Legend: FA=Final A (medal); FB=Final B (non-medal); FC=Final C (non-medal); FD=Final D (non-medal); FE=Final E (non-medal); FF=Final F (non-medal); SA/B=Semifinals A/B; SC/D=Semifinals C/D; SE/F=Semifinals E/F; Q=Quarterfinals; R=Repechage

== Shooting ==
Eleven Indian shooters qualified for the London Olympics, with seven male and four female competitors. India had earned 11 quotas in shooting events. India has been most successful in this category this year with Gagan Narang and Vijay Kumar winning bronze and silver medals respectively.

Men

Athlete	Event	Qualification		Final	
Athlete	Event	Points	Rank	Points	Rank
Abhinav Bindra	10 m air rifle	594	16	did not advance	
Joydeep Karmakar	50 m rifle prone	595	7 Q	699.1	4
Vijay Kumar	10 m air pistol	570	31	did not advance	
Vijay Kumar	25 m rapid fire pistol	585	4 Q	30	2nd place, silver medalist(s)
Gagan Narang	10 m air rifle	598	3 Q	701.1	3rd place, bronze medalist(s)
Gagan Narang	50 m rifle prone	593	18	did not advance	
Gagan Narang	50 m rifle 3 positions	1164	20	did not advance	
Sanjeev Rajput	50 m rifle 3 positions	1161	26	did not advance	
Manavjit Singh Sandhu	Trap	119	16	did not advance	
Ronjan Sodhi	Double trap	134	11	did not advance	

Women

Athlete	Event	Qualification		Final	
Athlete	Event	Points	Rank	Points	Rank
Shagun Chowdhary	Trap	61	20	did not advance	
Rahi Sarnobat	25 m pistol	579	19	did not advance	
Heena Sidhu	10 m air pistol	382	12	did not advance	
Annuraj Singh	25 m pistol	575	30	did not advance	
Annuraj Singh	10 m air pistol	378	23	did not advance	

== Swimming ==
India had gained a "Universality place" from the FINA.

Men

Athlete	Event	Heat		Final	
Athlete	Event	Time	Rank	Time	Rank
Ullalmath Gagan	1500 m freestyle	16:31.14	31	did not advance	

== Table tennis ==
India had won 2 quotas in table tennis.

Athlete	Event	Preliminary round	Round 1	Round 2	Round 3	Round 4	Quarterfinals	Semifinals	Final / BM	
Athlete	Event	Opposition Result	Opposition Result	Opposition Result	Opposition Result	Opposition Result	Opposition Result	Opposition Result	Opposition Result	Rank
Soumyajit Ghosh	Men's singles	Bye	Tsuboi (BRA); W 4–2	Kim H-B (PRK); L 1–4	did not advance					
Ankita Das	Women's singles	Bye	Ramirez (ESP); L 1–4	did not advance						

== Tennis ==
India had won 7 quotas in tennis.

Men

Athlete	Event	Round of 64	Round of 32	Round of 16	Quarterfinals	Semifinals	Final / BM	
Athlete	Event	Opposition Score	Opposition Score	Opposition Score	Opposition Score	Opposition Score	Opposition Score	Rank
Somdev Devvarman	Singles	Nieminen (FIN); L 3–6, 1–6	did not advance					
Vishnu Vardhan	Singles	Kavčič (SLO); L 3–6, 2–6	did not advance					
Mahesh Bhupathi; Rohan Bopanna	Doubles	—N/a	Bury / Mirnyi (BLR); W 7–6^{(7–4)}, 6–7^{(4–7)}, 8–6	Benneteau / Gasquet (FRA); L 3–6, 4–6	did not advance			
Leander Paes; Vishnu Vardhan	Doubles	—N/a	Haase / Rojer (NED); W 7–6^{(7–1)}, 4–6, 6–2	Llodra / Tsonga (FRA); L 6–7^{(3–7)}, 6–4, 3–6	did not advance			

Women

Athlete	Event	Round of 32	Round of 16	Quarterfinals	Semifinals	Final / BM	
Athlete	Event	Opposition Score	Opposition Score	Opposition Score	Opposition Score	Opposition Score	Rank
Rushmi Chakravarthi; Sania Mirza	Doubles	Chuang C-j / Hsieh S-w (TPE); L 1–6, 6–3, 1–6	did not advance				

Mixed

Athlete	Event	Round of 16	Quarterfinals	Semifinals	Final	
Athlete	Event	Opposition Score	Opposition Score	Opposition Score	Opposition Score	Rank
Leander Paes; Sania Mirza	Doubles	Ivanovic / Zimonjić (SRB); W 6–2, 6–4	Azarenka / Mirnyi (BLR); L 5–7, 6–7^{(5–7)}	did not advance		

== Weightlifting ==
India had won 2 quotas in weightlifting.

Athlete	Event	Snatch		Clean & Jerk		Total	Rank
Athlete	Event	Result	Rank	Result	Rank	Total	Rank
Katulu Ravi Kumar	Men's −69 kg	136	16	167	15	303	15
Ngangbam Soniya Chanu	Women's −48 kg	74	8	97	7	171	7

== Wrestling ==
India had won 5 quotas in the following events.

Key:

- VT - Victory by Fall.
- PP - Decision by Points - the loser with technical points.
- PO - Decision by Points - the loser without technical points.

Men's freestyle

Athlete	Event	Qualification	Round of 16	Quarterfinal	Semifinal	Repechage 1	Repechage 2	Final / BM	
Athlete	Event	Opposition Result	Opposition Result	Opposition Result	Opposition Result	Opposition Result	Opposition Result	Opposition Result	Rank
Amit Kumar	−55 kg	Bye	Rahimi (IRI); W 3–1 ^{PP}	Khinchegashvili (GEO); L 1–3 ^{PP}	Did not advance	Bye	Velikov (BUL); L 0–3 ^{PO}	Did not advance	10
Yogeshwar Dutt	−60 kg	Guidea (BUL); W 3–1 ^{PP}	Kudukhov (RUS); L 0–3 ^{PO}	did not advance		Gómez (PUR); W 3–0 ^{PO}	Esmaeilpour (IRI); W 3–1 ^{PP}	Ri J-M (PRK); W 3–1 ^{PP}	3rd place, bronze medalist(s)
Sushil Kumar	−66 kg	Bye	Şahin (TUR); W 3–1 ^{PP}	Navruzov (UZB); W 3–1 ^{PP}	Tanatarov (KAZ); W 3–1 ^{PP}	Bye		Yonemitsu (JPN); L 0–3 ^{PO}	2nd place, silver medalist(s)
Narsingh Pancham Yadav	−74 kg	Bye	Gentry (CAN); L 1–3 ^{PP}	did not advance					14

Women's freestyle

Athlete	Event	Qualification	Round of 16	Quarterfinal	Semifinal	Repechage 1	Repechage 2	Final / BM	
Athlete	Event	Opposition Result	Opposition Result	Opposition Result	Opposition Result	Opposition Result	Opposition Result	Opposition Result	Rank
Geeta Phogat	−55 kg	Bye	Verbeek (CAN); L 1–3 ^{PP}	did not advance		Bye	Lazareva (UKR); L 0–3 ^{PO}	Did not advance	13

== Controversies ==
=== Opening ceremony ===
An unknown woman in civilian attire was seen walking at the head of the Indian Olympic team's march past during the Parade of Nations. Her presence attracted media attention throughout India and raised questions about security at the Olympic Games. The woman was subsequently identified as Madhura Nagendra (incorrectly referred to by some sources as Madhura Honey), a graduate student from Bangalore living in London and a dancer in a segment of the opening ceremony co-ordinated by Danny Boyle. The London Organising Committee of the Olympic Games issued an apology to the Indian contingent over the incident and revoked Nagendra's Olympic security accreditation. On her return to India, Nagendra issued a public apology for her "error of judgement".

=== Boxing ===
Boxer Sumit Sangwan lost a closely contested bout 14–15 against Yamaguchi Falcao Florentino of Brazil in the light heavyweight category round of 32. The ESPN commentators described the loss as "daylight robbery". India's acting chef-de-mission Brigadier P. K. M. Raja, on the insistence of Sports Minister Ajay Maken, lodged an unsuccessful appeal against the judges' decision believing he had won.

A win by Vikas Krishan in the welterweight pre-quarters was overturned after an appeal by the opponent Errol Spence. The Indian was given four penalty points and the score was changed from 11–13 to 15–13 in favour of Errol Spence. The decision was overturned citing the nine holding fouls committed by the Indian boxer in the third round and for spitting out the gumshield intentionally. As the jury's decision was final, no further appeal by the Indians were permitted. India through its Acting Chef de Mission Brigadier PKM Raja approached the Court of Arbitration for Sport (CAS) but the appeal was rejected.

Boxer Manoj Kumar lost his pre quarterfinal light welterweight bout against Great Britain's Tom Stalker in a controversial manner. The boxer was at the wrong end of some of the judging calls and he cried "cheating" openly before leaving the boxing arena.

=== Badminton ===
Jwala Gutta and Ashwini Ponnappa missed out on a badminton - women's doubles quarterfinal berth by a difference of one point after tying with Japan and Taipei on points. Prior to India's final group game, the Japanese partnership of Mizuki Fujii and Reika Kakiiwa lost to Chinese Taipei's Cheng Wen Hsing and Chien Yu Chin. On behalf of the Badminton Association of India, a protest was lodged saying that the match between Japan and Chinese Taipei was fixed and that Japan had deliberately lost that match in order to have a better draw in the next round. The Indian appeal was turned down by force.

== See also ==
- India at the 2012 Summer Paralympics
- India at the 2012 Winter Youth Olympics
- Indian sports
