= Spain at the 2012 Summer Olympics =

- IOC code: ESP
- NOC: Spanish Olympic Committee
- Website: www.coe.es (in Spanish)

in London
- Competitors: 278 in 23 sports
- Flag bearers: Pau Gasol (opening); Saúl Craviotto (closing)
- Medals Ranked 17th: Gold 4 Silver 10 Bronze 6 Total 20

Summer Olympics appearances (overview)
- 1900; 1904–1912; 1920; 1924; 1928; 1932; 1936; 1948; 1952; 1956; 1960; 1964; 1968; 1972; 1976; 1980; 1984; 1988; 1992; 1996; 2000; 2004; 2008; 2012; 2016; 2020; 2024; 2028

Spain competed at the 2012 Summer Olympics in London, from 27 July to 12 August 2012. This nation has competed in all but two Summer Olympic Games since its official debut in 1920. Spain boycotted two editions, the 1936 Summer Olympics in Nazi Germany and the 1956 Summer Olympics in Melbourne, as a protest against the Soviet invasion of Hungary. In 2012, the Spanish Olympic Committee sent the nation's smallest delegation to the Games since 1988. A total of 278 athletes, 166 men and 112 women, competed in 23 sports.

Spain left London with a total of 17 Olympic medals (3 gold, 10 silver, and 4 bronze), failing short of the total achieved in Beijing by a single medal. Three of the medals were awarded in taekwondo and canoeing, and two each in sailing, swimming, and synchronized swimming. Three Spanish athletes won more than a single medal in London, while all of their competitors in synchronized swimming and taekwondo won at least one medal. Spain's competitors in team sports also proved successful in London, as the women's handball and water polo teams won silver and bronze medals respectively. The men's basketball team managed to repeat its silver medal from Beijing. Spain, however, did not win an Olympic medal in tennis for the first time since it was reintroduced as a full-medal sport in 1988, and in cycling for the first time since that same year. On 21 November 2016, a fourth gold medal was assigned to Spain's Lydia Valentín in Weightlifting (Women's 75 kg) after the IOC disqualified the original medallists in the event for failing doping tests at the Games. In 2021, another two bronze medals were assigned to Spain's Ruth Beitia in Athletics high jump and Alfonso Benavides in Canoeing C-1 200 metres after the IOC disqualified the original bronze medalists in the events for failing doping tests at the Games. These make Spain finally get 20 medals with 4 golds.

Among the nation's medallists were sailor Marina Alabau in women's windsurfing, and sprint kayaker Saúl Craviotto, who previously won gold in Beijing. Three athletes won Spain's first ever Olympic medals in their respective disciplines: triathlete Javier Gómez Noya, slalom kayaker Maialen Chourraut, and freestyle wrestler Maider Unda. Sprint canoer David Cal, who won silver in London, became the first Spanish athlete in history to win a total of five Olympic medals. Meanwhile, Mireia Belmonte became the first Spanish swimmer in history to win two Olympic medals.

== Medalists ==
Medal	Name	Sport	Event	Date
Gold	Lydia Valentín	Weightlifting	Women's 75 kg	3 August
Gold	Marina Alabau	Sailing	Women's sailboard	7 August
Gold	Joel González	Taekwondo	Men's 58 kg	8 August
Gold	Támara Echegoyen; Ángela Pumariega; Sofía Toro	Sailing	Elliott 6m	11 August
Silver	Mireia Belmonte	Swimming	Women's 200 metre butterfly	1 August
Silver	Mireia Belmonte	Swimming	Women's 800 metre freestyle	3 August
Silver	Javier Gómez Noya	Triathlon	Men's	7 August
Silver	Ona Carbonell; Andrea Fuentes	Synchronized swimming	Women's duet	7 August
Silver	David Cal	Canoeing	Men's C-1 1000 m	8 August
Silver	Brigitte Yagüe	Taekwondo	Women's 49 kg	8 August
Silver	Spain women's national water polo team: Marta Bach; Andrea Blas; Ana Copado; Anna Espar; Laura Ester; María García Godoy; Laura López; Ona Meseguer; Lorena Miranda; Matilde Ortiz; Jennifer Pareja; María del Pilar Peña; Roser Tarragó	Water polo	Women's tournament	9 August
Silver	Nicolás García	Taekwondo	Men's 80 kg	10 August
Silver	Saúl Craviotto	Canoeing	Men's K-1 200 m	11 August
Silver	Spain men's national basketball team: José Calderón; Víctor Claver; Rudy Fernández; Marc Gasol; Pau Gasol; Serge Ibaka; Sergio Llull; Juan Carlos Navarro; Felipe Reyes; Sergio Rodríguez; Víctor Sada; Fernando San Emeterio	Basketball	Men's tournament	12 August
Bronze	Maialen Chourraut	Canoeing	Women's slalom K-1	2 August
Bronze	Maider Unda	Wrestling	Women's freestyle 72 kg	9 August
Bronze	Clara Basiana; Alba Cabello; Ona Carbonell; Margalida Crespí; Andrea Fuentes; Thaïs Henríquez; Paula Klamburg; Irene Montrucchio; Laia Pons	Synchronized swimming	Women's team	10 August
Bronze	Spain women's national handball team: Macarena Aguilar; Nely Carla Alberto; Jessica Alonso; Vanesa Amorós; Andrea Barnó; Elisabet Chávez; Mihaela Ciobanu; Verónica Cuadrado; Patricia Elorza; Beatriz Fernández; Begoña Fernández; Marta Mangué; Carmen Martín; Silvia Navarro; Elisabeth Pinedo	Handball	Women's tournament	11 August
Bronze	Ruth Beitia	Athletics	Women's high jump	11 August
Bronze	Alfonso Benavides	Canoeing	Canoeing C-1 200 metres	11 August

Medals by sport
Sport	1st place, gold medalist(s)	2nd place, silver medalist(s)	3rd place, bronze medalist(s)	Total
Sailing	2	0	0	2
Taekwondo	1	2	0	3
Weightlifting	1	0	0	1
Canoeing	0	2	2	4
Swimming	0	2	0	2
Synchronized swimming	0	1	1	2
Basketball	0	1	0	1
Triathlon	0	1	0	1
Water polo	0	1	0	1
Athletics	0	0	1	1
Handball	0	0	1	1
Wrestling	0	0	1	1
Total	4	10	6	20

== Delegation ==
The Spanish Olympic Committee (Spanish: Comité Olímpico Español, COE) selected a team of 278 athletes, 166 men and 112 women, to compete in 23 sports; it was the nation's sixth-largest team sent to the Olympics, but the smallest since 1988. Spain did not qualify athletes in fencing, modern pentathlon, and rowing, but there was only a single competitor in women's freestyle wrestling. Athletics was the largest team by sport, with a total of 46 competitors.

The Spanish team featured several Olympic medalists from Beijing, including sailors Iker Martínez and Xabier Fernández in the open skiff class, and sprint canoer David Cal, who won the silver in two of his events. Race walker Jesús Ángel García became the second Spanish athlete to compete in six Olympic Games, tying the record set by former water polo player Manuel Estiarte. Meanwhile, another race walker María Vasco, and field hockey player Pablo Amat competed at their fifth Olympics. Table tennis player He Zhi Wen, at age 50, was the oldest athlete of the team, while rhythmic gymnast Lourdes Mohedano was the youngest at age 17.

Other notable Spanish athletes featured sprint kayaker and two-time world champion Saúl Craviotto, swimmer Mireia Belmonte in the women's medley, butterfly, and freestyle events, tennis doubles specialist Anabel Medina Garrigues, and NBA basketball players Víctor Claver and Serge Ibaka. Former world number-one male tennis player and defending Olympic champion Rafael Nadal was initially selected by the committee to carry the nation's flag, but he later withdrew from the Games because of an undisclosed injury. On 20 July 2012, NBA basketball star Pau Gasol, who led his team by winning the silver medal in Beijing, replaced Nadal as Spain's flag bearer at the opening ceremony.

The following is the list of number of competitors participating in the Games. Note that reserves for fencing, field hockey, football, and handball are not counted as athletes:

Sport	Men	Women	Total
Archery	1	1	2
Athletics	27	19	46
Badminton	1	1	2
Basketball	12	0	12
Boxing	2	0	2
Canoeing	6	2	8
Cycling	15	1	16
Diving	1	1	2
Equestrian	2	1	3
Field hockey	16	0	16
Football	18	0	18
Gymnastics	5	8	13
Handball	14	14	28
Judo	2	4	6
Sailing	7	7	14
Shooting	6	2	8
Swimming	3	11	14
Synchronized swimming	0	9	9
Table tennis	2	3	5
Taekwondo	2	1	3
Tennis	6	6	12
Triathlon	3	3	6
Volleyball	2	2	4
Water polo	13	13	26
Weightlifting	1	1	2
Wrestling	0	1	1
Total	166	112	278

== Archery ==
Spain had qualified one archer each in the men's and women's individual events.

Athlete	Event	Ranking round		Round of 64	Round of 32	Round of 16	Quarterfinals	Semifinals	Final / BM	
Athlete	Event	Score	Seed	Opposition Score	Opposition Score	Opposition Score	Opposition Score	Opposition Score	Opposition Score	Rank
Elías Cuesta	Men's individual	660	41	Ivashko (UKR) (24); L 4–6	Did not advance					
Iria Grandal	Women's individual	618	53	Rendón (COL) (12); W 6–5	Choi H-J (KOR) (21); L 5–6	Did not advance				

== Athletics ==
Spanish athletes qualified standards in the following athletics events (up to a maximum of 3 athletes in each event at the 'A' Standard, and 1 at the 'B' Standard):

Key

- Note–Ranks given for track events are within the athlete's heat only
- Q = Qualified for the next round
- q = Qualified for the next round as a fastest loser or, in field events, by position without achieving the qualifying target
- NR = National record
- N/A = Round not applicable for the event
- Bye = Athlete not required to compete in round

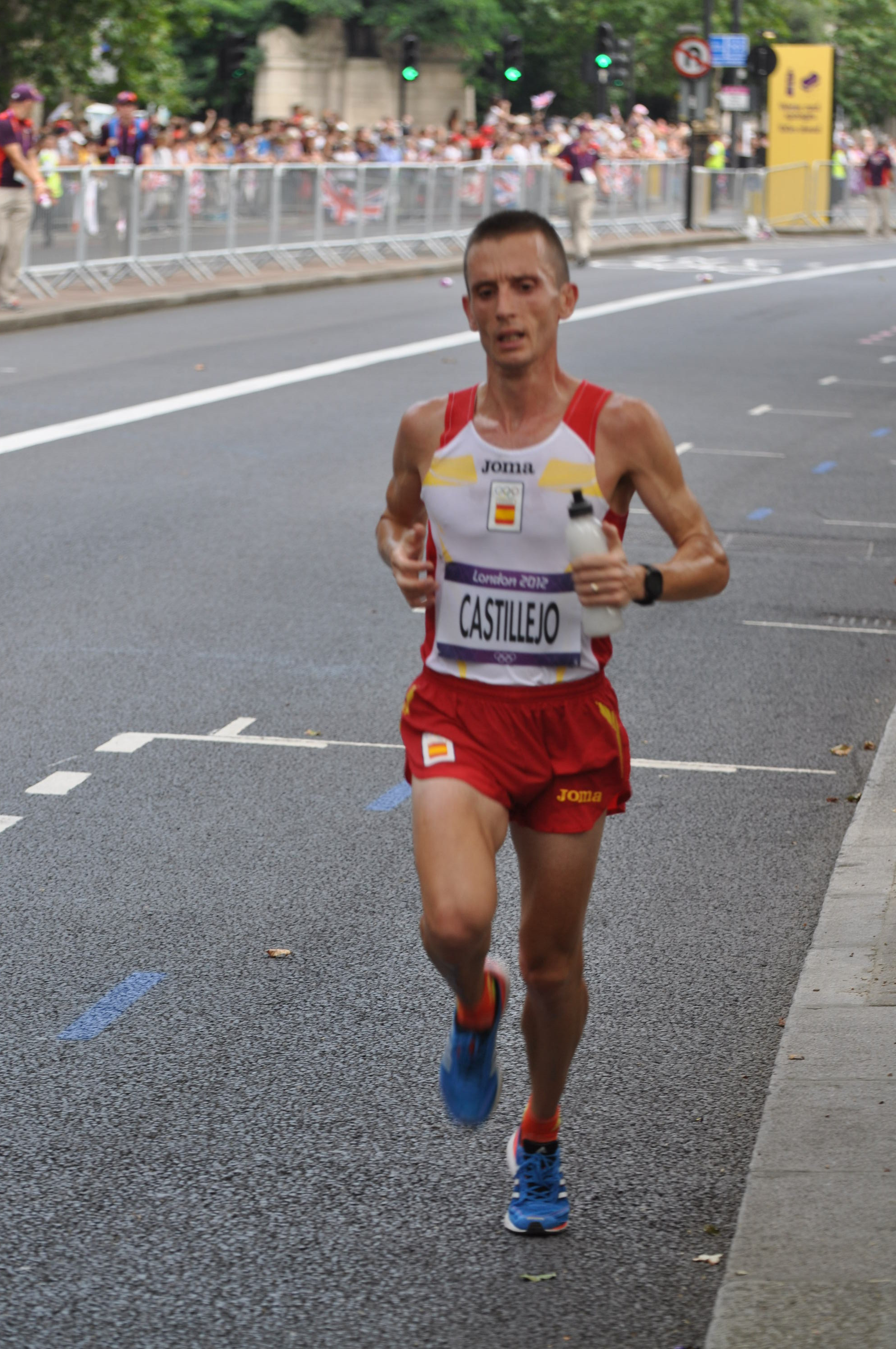
Carles Castillejo in men's marathon

Men
Track & road events

Athlete	Event	Heat		Quarterfinal		Semifinal		Final	
Athlete	Event	Result	Rank	Result	Rank	Result	Rank	Result	Rank
Ángel David Rodríguez	100 m	Bye		10.34	5	Did not advance			
Kevin López	800 m	1:48.27	3 Q	—N/a		1:46.66	6	Did not advance	
Luis Alberto Marco	800 m	1:46.86	3 Q	—N/a		1:46.19	6	Did not advance	
Antonio Manuel Reina	800 m	1:47.44	3 Q	—N/a		1:45.84	6	Did not advance	
David Bustos	1500 m	3:41.34	8	—N/a		Did not advance			
Álvaro Rodríguez	1500 m	3:41.54	12	—N/a		Did not advance			
Diego Ruiz	1500 m	3:41.52	7	—N/a		Did not advance			
Ayad Lamdassen	10000 m	—N/a						28:49.85	23
Jackson Quiñónez	110 m hurdles	13.76	4	—N/a		Did not advance			
Víctor García	3000 m steeplechase	DNF		—N/a				Did not advance	
Abdelaziz Merzougui	3000 m steeplechase	8:58.20	12	—N/a				Did not advance	
Ángel Mullera	3000 m steeplechase	8:38.07	11	—N/a				Did not advance	
Ignacio Cáceres	Marathon	—N/a						2:17:11	31
Carles Castillejo	Marathon	—N/a						2:16:17	24
José Carlos Hernández	Marathon	—N/a						2:17:48	34
Miguel Ángel López	20 km walk	—N/a						1:19:49	5
Álvaro Martín	20 km walk	—N/a						DNF	
Jesús Ángel García	50 km walk	—N/a						3:48:32	20
Mikel Odriozola	50 km walk	—N/a						4:02:48	42
Benjamín Sánchez	50 km walk	—N/a						4:14:40	50

Field events

Athlete	Event	Qualification		Final	
Athlete	Event	Distance	Position	Distance	Position
Igor Bychkov	Pole vault	5.50	=9 q	5.50	12
Eusebio Cáceres	Long jump	7.92	14	Did not advance	
Luis Felipe Méliz	Long jump	NM	—	Did not advance	
Borja Vivas	Shot put	18.88	31	Did not advance	
Frank Casañas	Discus throw	63.76	11 q	65.56	7
Mario Pestano	Discus throw	63.40	14	Did not advance	
Javier Cienfuegos	Hammer throw	73.73	16	Did not advance	

Women
Track & road events

Athlete	Event	Heat		Semifinal		Final	
Athlete	Event	Result	Rank	Result	Rank	Result	Rank
Aauri Bokesa	400 m	53.67	6	Did not advance			
Nuria Fernández	1500 m	4:13.72	4 Q	4:06.57	10	Did not advance	
Isabel Macías	1500 m	4:13.07	12	Did not advance			
Natalia Rodríguez	1500 m	4:16.18	14	Did not advance			
Judit Plá	5000 m	15:20.39	12	—N/a		Did not advance	
Marta Domínguez	3000 m steeplechase	9:29.71	4 Q	—N/a		9:36.45	12
Diana Martín	3000 m steeplechase	9:35.77	8	—N/a		Did not advance	
Alessandra Aguilar	Marathon	—N/a				2:29:19	26
Elena María Espeso	Marathon	—N/a				2:36:12	61
Vanessa Veiga	Marathon	—N/a				2:46:53	97
Beatriz Pascual	20 km walk	—N/a				1:27:56	8
María José Poves	20 km walk	—N/a				1:29:36	12
María Vasco	20 km walk	—N/a				1:28:14	10

Field events

Athlete	Event	Qualification		Final	
Athlete	Event	Distance	Position	Distance	Position
Ruth Beitia	High jump	1.93	=2 q	2.00	3rd place, bronze medalist(s)
Concepción Montaner	Long jump	6.30	19	Did not advance	
Patricia Sarrapio	Triple jump	13.64	26	Did not advance	
Úrsula Ruiz	Shot put	17.99	17	Did not advance	
Berta Castells	Hammer throw	68.41	21	Did not advance	
Noraida Bicet	Javelin throw	57.77	25	Did not advance	

== Badminton ==
Athlete	Event	Group Stage			Elimination	Quarterfinal	Semifinal	Final / BM	
Athlete	Event	Opposition Score	Opposition Score	Rank	Opposition Score	Opposition Score	Opposition Score	Opposition Score	Rank
Pablo Abián	Men's singles	Hidayat (INA); L 20–22, 11–21	Koukal (CZE); W 21–17, 16–21, 21–16	2	Did not advance				
Carolina Marín	Women's singles	Li Xr (CHN); L 13–21, 11–21	Rivero (PER); W 21–17, 21–7	2	Did not advance				

== Basketball ==
Spain's men basketball team qualified for the event by reaching the final of the EuroBasket 2011.

- Men's team event – 1 team of 12 players

=== Men's tournament ===
Roster

The following is the Spain roster in the men's basketball tournament of the 2012 Summer Olympics.

Spain men's national basketball team – 2012 Summer Olympics roster
Players
Coaches

Pos.	No.	Name	Age – Date of birth	Height	Club
PF	4	Pau Gasol	32 – 6 July 1980	2.13 m (7 ft 0 in)	Los Angeles Lakers
SF	5	Rudy Fernández	27 – 4 April 1985	1.98 m (6 ft 6 in)	Real Madrid Baloncesto
PG	6	Sergio Rodríguez	26 – 12 June 1986	1.92 m (6 ft 4 in)	Real Madrid Baloncesto
SG	7	Juan Carlos Navarro (C)	32 – 13 June 1980	1.92 m (6 ft 4 in)	FC Barcelona Bàsquet
PG	8	José Calderón	30 – 28 September 1981	1.92 m (6 ft 4 in)	Toronto Raptors
C	9	Felipe Reyes	32 – 16 March 1980	2.06 m (6 ft 9 in)	Real Madrid Baloncesto
SF	10	Víctor Claver	23 – 30 August 1988	2.07 m (6 ft 9 in)	Portland Trail Blazers
SF	11	Fernando San Emeterio	28 – 1 January 1984	1.99 m (6 ft 6 in)	Caja Laboral Baskonia
SG	12	Sergio Llull	24 – 15 November 1987	1.92 m (6 ft 4 in)	Real Madrid Baloncesto
C	13	Marc Gasol	27 – 29 January 1985	2.16 m (7 ft 1 in)	Memphis Grizzlies
PF	14	Serge Ibaka	23 – 18 July 1989	2.08 m (6 ft 10 in)	Oklahoma City Thunder
PG	15	Víctor Sada	28 – 8 March 1984	1.92 m (6 ft 4 in)	FC Barcelona Bàsquet

Head coach

- Sergio Scariolo

Assistant coach(es)

- Juan Antonio Orenga
- Quim Costa

Legend

- Club – describes last
  club before the tournament
- Age – describes age
  on 29 July 2012

Group play

Pos	Team	Pld	W	L	PF	PA	PD	Pts	Qualification
1	Russia	5	4	1	400	359	+41	9 (Note: Head-to-head record: Russia 1–0 Brazil)	Quarterfinals
2	Brazil	5	4	1	402	349	+53	9	Quarterfinals
3	Spain	5	3	2	414	394	+20	8 (Note: Head-to-head record: Spain 1–0 Australia)	Quarterfinals
4	Australia	5	3	2	410	373	+37	8	Quarterfinals
5	Great Britain (H)	5	1	4	380	405	−25	6	
6	China	5	0	5	313	439	−126	5	

Source: FIBA archive
Rules for classification: 1) points; 2) head-to-head points; 3) head-to-head goal average; 4) head-to-head number of points scored.
(H) Hosts
Notes:

29 July 2012
16:45

Report

Spain	97–81	China
Scoring by quarter: 19–17, 34–24, 16–19, 28–21
Pts: P. Gasol 21; Rebs: P. Gasol 11; Asts: M. Gasol 5		Pts: Yi Jianlian 30; Rebs: Yi Jianlian 12; Asts: Chen Jianghua 5

Basketball Arena, London
Referees: Luigi Lamonica (ITA), Felicia Grinter (USA), Fernando Sampietro (ARG)

31 July 2012
11:15

Report

Australia	70–82	Spain
Scoring by quarter: 19–14, 13–23, 10–26, 28–19
Pts: Ingles 12; Rebs: Andersen 7 Asts: Dellavedova 4		Pts: P. Gasol 20; Rebs: Reyes 12; Asts: three players 3

Basketball Arena, London
Referees: Carl Jungebrand (FIN), Borys Ryschyk (UKR), José Carrion (PUR)

2 August 2012
20:00

Report

Spain	79–78	Great Britain
Scoring by quarter: 24–15, 13–14, 24–19, 18–30
Pts: Calderón 19; Rebs: San Emeterio 10; Asts: Fernández 7		Pts: Deng 26; Rebs: Deng 9 Asts: Deng 7

Basketball Arena, London
Referees: Bill Kennedy (USA), Saša Pukl (SLO), Oļegs Latiševs (LAT)

4 August 2012
11:15

Report

Russia	77–74	Spain
Scoring by quarter: 11–28, 21–12, 24–13, 21–21
Pts: Fridzon 24; Rebs: Mozgov 9 Asts: Ponkrashov 11		Pts: P. Gasol 20; Rebs: M. Gasol 9 Asts: Rodríguez, Calderón 3

Basketball Arena, London
Referees: Christos Christodoulou (GRE), Jorge Vázquez (PUR), Fernando Sampietro (ARG)

6 August 2012
20:00

Report

Spain	82–88	Brazil
Scoring by quarter: 26–17, 18–21, 22–19, 16–31
Pts: P. Gasol 25; Rebs: P. Gasol 7 Asts: three players 4		Pts: Barbosa 23; Rebs: Varejão 7 Asts: Huertas 6

Basketball Arena, London
Referees: Pablo Estévez (ARG), Jorge Vázquez (PUR), Robert Lottermoser (GER)

Quarter-final

8 August 2012
16:15

Report

France	59–66	Spain
Scoring by quarter: 22–17, 15–17, 16–17, 6–15
Pts: Parker, Diaw 15; Rebs: Diaw 8 Asts: Diaw 5		Pts: M. Gasol 14; Rebs: P. Gasol 11; Asts: P. Gasol, Fernández 3

North Greenwich Arena, London
Referees: Cristiano Maranho (BRA), Bill Kennedy (USA), Christos Christodoulou (GRE)

Semi-final

10 August 2012
17:00

Report

Spain	67–59	Russia
Scoring by quarter: 9–12, 11–19, 26–15, 21–13
Pts: P. Gasol 16; Rebs: P. Gasol 12; Asts: three players 3		Pts: Kaun 14; Rebs: Kirilenko 8 Asts: Shved 7

North Greenwich Arena, London
Referees: Luigi Lamonica (ITA), Ilija Belošević (SRB), Marcos Benito (BRA)

Gold medal match

12 August 2012
15:00

Report 1
Report 2

(gold) United States	107–100	Spain (silver)
Scoring by quarter: 35–27, 24–31, 24–24, 24–18
Pts: Durant 30; Rebs: Durant, Love 9 Asts: James 4		Pts: P. Gasol 24; Rebs: Ibaka 9 Asts: P. Gasol 7

North Greenwich Arena, London
Referees: Cristiano Maranho (BRA), Christos Christodoulou (GRE), Michael Aylen (AUS)

== Boxing ==
Spain qualified boxers for the following events.

Men

Athlete	Event	Round of 32	Round of 16	Quarterfinals	Semifinals	Final	
Athlete	Event	Opposition Result	Opposition Result	Opposition Result	Opposition Result	Opposition Result	Rank
José Kelvin de la Nieve	Light flyweight	Quipo (ECU); L 11–14	Did not advance				
Jonathan Alonso	Light welterweight	Tolouti (IRI); L 12–16	Did not advance				

== Canoeing ==
=== Slalom ===
Spain qualified boats for the following events.

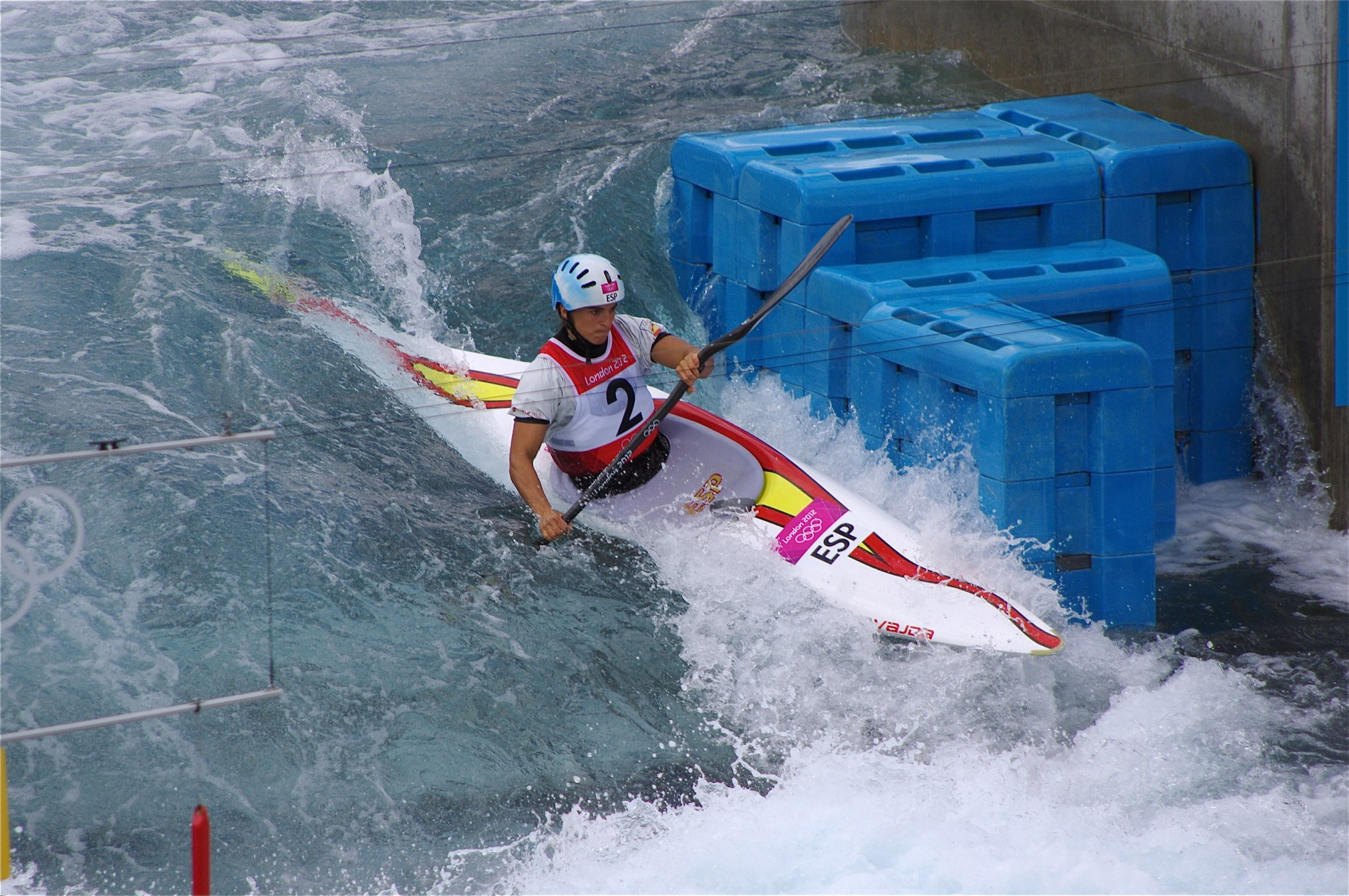
Maialen Chourraut in K-1 semifinal

Athlete	Event	Preliminary						Semifinal		Final	
Athlete	Event	Run 1	Rank	Run 2	Rank	Best	Rank	Time	Rank	Time	Rank
Ander Elosegi	Men's C-1	93.24	2	96.60	8	93.24	6 Q	104.04	4 Q	102.61	4
Samuel Hernanz	Men's K-1	87.07	1	91.25	12	87.07	3 Q	97.18	4 Q	96.95	5
Maialen Chourraut	Women's K-1	98.75	1	107.91	10	98.75	1 Q	108.34	2 Q	106.87	3rd place, bronze medalist(s)

=== Sprint ===
Spain qualified boats for the following events

Athlete	Event	Heats		Semifinals		Finals	
Athlete	Event	Time	Rank	Time	Rank	Time	Rank
Alfonso Benavides	Men's C-1 200 m	40.993	1 Q	40.619	2 FA	43.038	3rd place, bronze medalist(s)
David Cal	Men's C-1 1000 m	3:54.590	1 Q	3:52.767	3 FA	3:48.053	2nd place, silver medalist(s)
Saúl Craviotto	Men's K-1 200 m	35.552	1 Q	35.597	2 FA	36.540	2nd place, silver medalist(s)
Francisco Cubelos	Men's K-1 1000 m	3:37.791	5 Q	3:31.833	4 FA	3:32.521	7
María Teresa Portela	Women's K-1 200 m	41.263	1 Q	40.898	2 FA	45.326	4

Qualification Legend: FA = Qualify to final (medal); FB = Qualify to final B (non-medal)

== Cycling ==
Spain qualified riders for the following events.

=== Road ===
Athlete	Event	Time	Rank
Jonathan Castroviejo	Men's road race	5:46:13	26
Jonathan Castroviejo	Men's time trial	53:29.36	9
José Joaquín Rojas	Men's road race	5:46:37	44
Luis León Sánchez	Men's road race	5:46:05	14
Luis León Sánchez	Men's time trial	56:59.16	32
Alejandro Valverde	Men's road race	5:46:05	18
Francisco Ventoso	Men's road race	5:46:37	31

=== Track ===
Sprint

Athlete	Event	Qualification		Round 1	Repechage 1	Round 2	Repechage 2	Quarterfinals	Semifinals	Final	
Athlete	Event	Time Speed (km/h)	Rank	Opposition Time Speed (km/h)	Opposition Time Speed (km/h)	Opposition Time Speed (km/h)	Opposition Time Speed (km/h)	Opposition Time Speed (km/h)	Opposition Time Speed (km/h)	Opposition Time Speed (km/h)	Rank
Hodei Mazquiarán	Men's sprint	10.604; 67.898	16	Perkins (AUS); L	Esterhuizen (RSA); Zhang M (CHN); L	Did not advance					

Pursuit

Athlete	Event	Qualification		Semifinals		Final	
Athlete	Event	Time	Rank	Opponent Results	Rank	Opponent Results	Rank
Pablo Aitor Bernal; Sebastian Vedri; David Muntaner; Albert Torres	Men's team pursuit	4:02.113	6 Q	Colombia; 3:59.520	6	Denmark; 4:02.746	6

Keirin

Athlete	Event	1st Round	Repechage	2nd Round	Final
Athlete	Event	Rank	Rank	Rank	Rank
Juan Peralta	Men's keirin	3	2 Q	5	10

Omnium

Athlete	Event	Flying lap		Points race		Elimination race	Individual pursuit		Scratch race	Time trial		Total points	Rank
Athlete	Event	Time	Rank	Points	Rank	Rank	Result	Rank	Rank	Time	Rank	Total points	Rank
Eloy Teruel	Men's omnium	13.655	14	55	3	17	4:29.874	9	2	1:05.463	14	59	9
Leire Olaberría	Women's omnium	14.463	6	3	12	12	3:46.317	14	16	36.393	8	69	13

=== Mountain biking ===
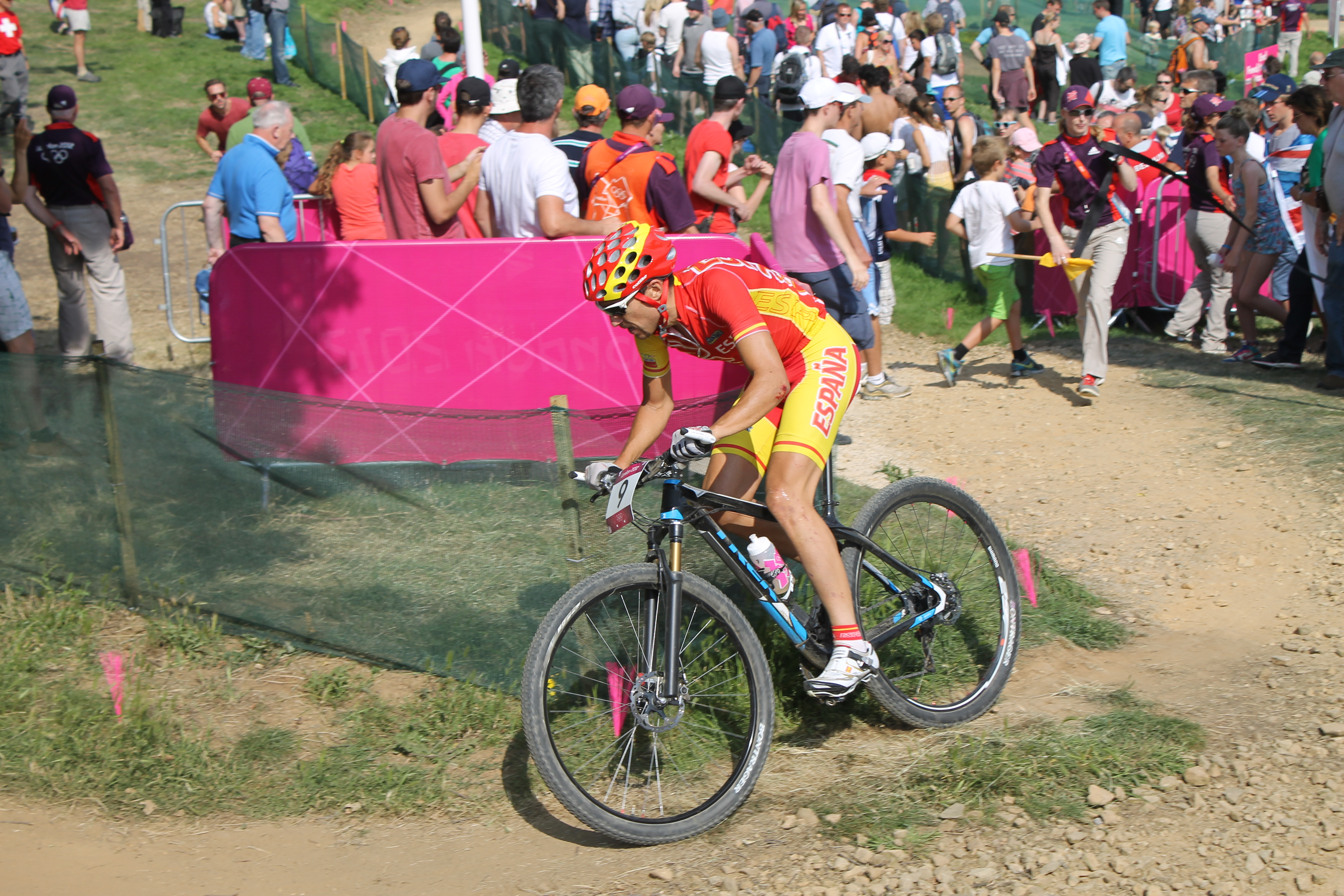
Sergio Mantecón Gutiérrez in men's cross-country race

Athlete	Event	Time	Rank
Carlos Coloma Nicolás	Men's cross-country	1:30:07	6
José Antonio Hermida	Men's cross-country	1:29:36	4
Sergio Mantecón Gutiérrez	Men's cross-country	1:33:46	22

== Diving ==
Spain qualified two divers:

Men

Athlete	Event	Preliminaries		Semifinals		Final	
Athlete	Event	Points	Rank	Points	Rank	Points	Rank
Javier Illana	3 m springboard	460.35	8 Q	458.05	10 Q	371.60	12

Women

Athlete	Event	Preliminaries		Semifinals		Final	
Athlete	Event	Points	Rank	Points	Rank	Points	Rank
Jenifer Benítez	3 m springboard	224.60	30	Did not advance			

== Equestrian ==
=== Dressage ===
Spain qualified one team and three individual quota places after finishing in fifth place at the 2011 European Dressage Championship.

Athlete	Horse	Event	Grand Prix		Grand Prix Special		Grand Prix Freestyle		Overall	
Athlete	Horse	Event	Score	Rank	Score	Rank	Technical	Artistic	Overall Score	Rank
Morgan Barbançon	Painted Black	Individual	72.751	19 Q	71.556	23	Did not advance			
Jose Daniel Martín Dockx	Grandioso	Individual	69.043	39 Q	69.286	29	Did not advance			
Juan Manuel Muñoz	Fuego XII	Individual	75.608	10 Q	75.476	11 Q	74.786	83.857	79.321	10
Morgan Barbançon; Jose Daniel Martín Dockx; Juan Manuel Muñoz	See above	Team	72.467	6	72.106	6	—N/a		72.287	7

== Field hockey ==
- Men's team event – 1 team of 16 players

=== Men's tournament ===
Roster

The following is the Spain roster in the men's field hockey tournament of the 2012 Summer Olympics.

Head Coach: Dani Martín

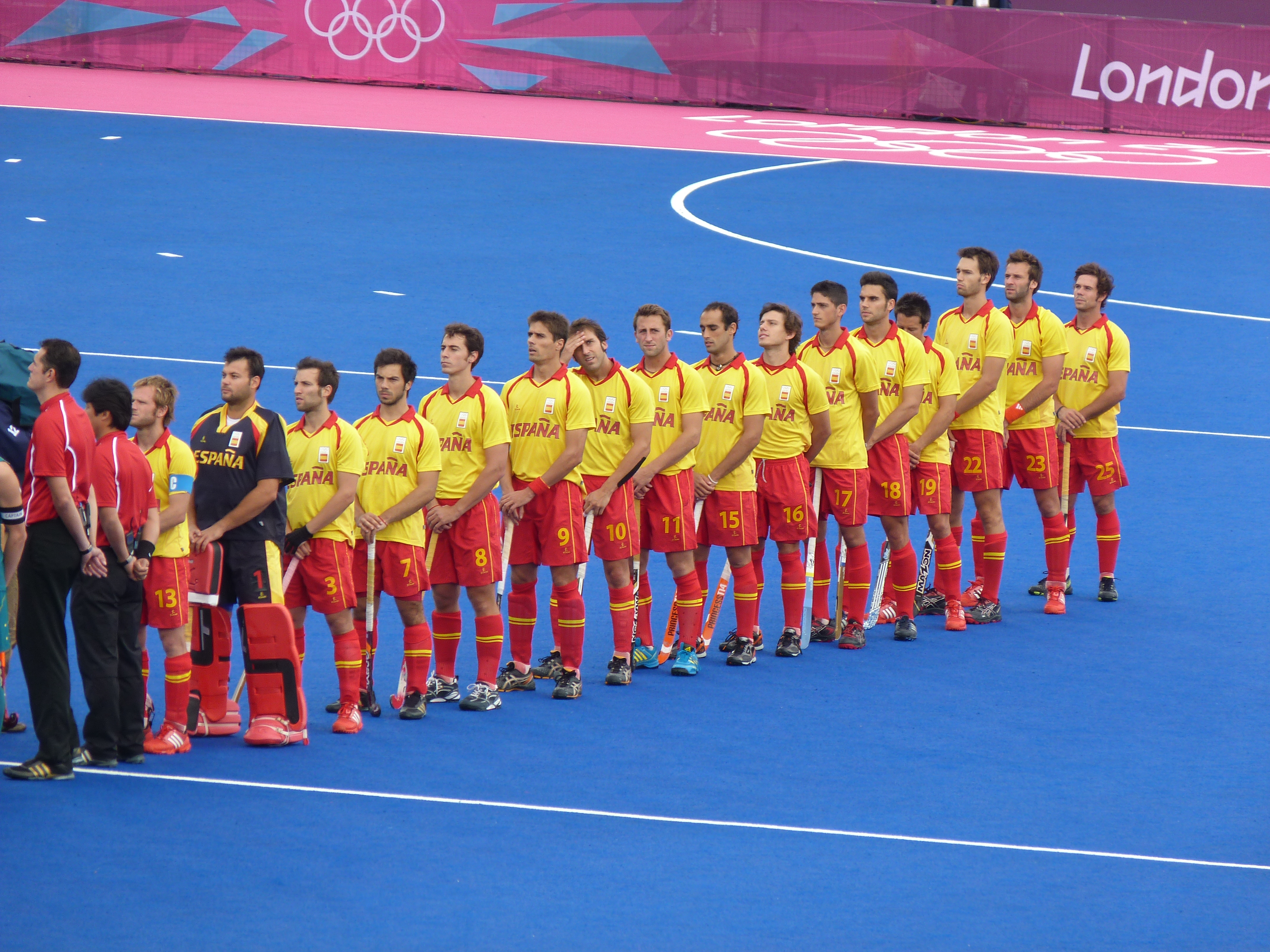
Spain national field hockey team before their game with Australia in the 2012 Olympics.

1. Francisco Cortés (GK)
2. Santi Freixa (C)
3. Sergi Enrique
7. Miguel Delas
8. Alex Fàbregas
9. Pol Amat
10. Eduard Tubau
11. Roc Oliva
13. Ramón Alegre
15. Jose Ballbe
16. Juan Fernández
17. Xavi Lleonart
18. Andrés Mir
19. Marc Salles (R)
20. Xavier Trenchs (GK) (R)
22. Manel Terraza
23. David Alegre
25. Pau Quemada

Group play

Pos	Team	Pld	W	D	L	GF	GA	GD	Pts	Qualification
1	Australia	5	3	2	0	23	5	+18	11	Semi-finals
2	Great Britain (H)	5	2	3	0	14	8	+6	9	Semi-finals
3	Spain	5	2	2	1	8	10	−2	8	Fifth place game
4	Pakistan	5	2	1	2	9	16	−7	7	Seventh place game
5	Argentina	5	1	1	3	10	14	−4	4	Ninth place game
6	South Africa	5	0	1	4	11	22	−11	1	Eleventh place game

Source: FIH
(H) Hosts

30 July 2012
13:45

Spain	1–1	Pakistan
Quemada 47'	Report	Butt 46'

Umpires:
Simon Taylor (NZL)
Nigel Iggo (NZL)

1 August 2012
08:30

Spain	0–5	Australia
	Report	Ford 9'; Butturini 14'; Orchard 29'; Turner 40'; Ockenden 69'

Umpires:
Kim Hong-lae (KOR)
Christian Blasch (GER)

3 August 2012
19:00

South Africa	2–3	Spain
Reid-Ross 26'; Norris-Jones 63'	Report	Salles 30'; Quemada 42'; Delas 55'

Umpires:
German Montes de Oca (ARG)
Tim Pullman (AUS)

5 August 2012
21:15

Argentina	1–3	Spain
L. Vila 55'	Report	Quemada 66'; Delas 67'; Tubau 70'

Umpires:
Hamish Jamson (GBR)
Tim Pullman (AUS)

7 August 2012
19:00

Spain	1–1	Great Britain
Quemada 55'	Report	Jackson 33'

Umpires:
Simon Taylor (NZL)
John Wright (RSA)

5th/6th place game

11 August 2012
11:30

Spain	2–5	Belgium
Alegre 19'; Tubau 61'	Report	Dekeyser 3'; Boon 21', 32'; Van Aubel 24'; Briels 52'

Umpires:
Roel van Eert (NED)
Colin Hutchinson (IRL)

== Football ==
Spain's men football team qualified for the event by reaching the final of the 2011 UEFA European Under-21 Football Championship.

- Men's team event – 1 team of 18 players

=== Men's tournament ===
Team roster

The following is the Spain squad in the men's football tournament of the 2012 Summer Olympics.

Coach: Luis Milla

No.	Pos.	Player	Date of birth (age)	Caps	Goals	2012 club
1	GK	David de Gea	7 November 1990 (aged 21)	2	0	(The Football Association) Manchester United
2	DF	César Azpilicueta	28 August 1989 (aged 22)	3	0	(French Football Federation) Marseille
3	DF	Álvaro Domínguez	15 May 1989 (aged 23)	3	0	(German Football Association) Borussia Mönchengladbach
4	MF	Javi Martínez* (c)	2 September 1988 (aged 23)	1	1	(Royal Spanish Football Federation) Athletic Bilbao
5	DF	Iñigo Martínez	17 May 1991 (aged 21)	2	0	(Royal Spanish Football Federation) Real Sociedad
6	DF	Jordi Alba	21 March 1989 (aged 23)	1	0	(Royal Spanish Football Federation) Barcelona
7	FW	Adrián López*	8 January 1988 (aged 24)	2	0	(Royal Spanish Football Federation) Atlético Madrid
8	FW	Iker Muniain	19 December 1992 (aged 19)	1	0	(Royal Spanish Football Federation) Athletic Bilbao
9	FW	Rodrigo	6 March 1991 (aged 21)	2	0	(Portuguese Football Federation) Benfica
10	MF	Juan Mata*	28 April 1988 (aged 24)	1	0	(The Football Association) Chelsea
11	MF	Koke	8 January 1992 (aged 20)	3	1	(Royal Spanish Football Federation) Atlético Madrid
12	DF	Martín Montoya	14 April 1991 (aged 21)	3	0	(Royal Spanish Football Federation) Barcelona
13	DF	Alberto Botía	27 January 1989 (aged 23)	2	0	(Royal Spanish Football Federation) Sporting Gijón
14	MF	Oriol Romeu	24 September 1991 (aged 20)	3	0	(The Football Association) Chelsea
15	MF	Isco	21 April 1992 (aged 20)	2	0	(Royal Spanish Football Federation) Málaga
16	FW	Cristian Tello	11 August 1991 (aged 20)	3	0	(Royal Spanish Football Federation) Barcelona
17	MF	Ander Herrera	14 August 1989 (aged 22)	2	0	(Royal Spanish Football Federation) Athletic Bilbao
18	GK	Diego Mariño	9 May 1990 (aged 22)	3	0	(Royal Spanish Football Federation) Villarreal

* Over-aged player.

Group play

Pos	Team	Pld	W	D	L	GF	GA	GD	Pts	Qualification
1	Japan	3	2	1	0	2	0	+2	7	Advance to knockout stage
2	Honduras	3	1	2	0	3	2	+1	5	Advance to knockout stage
3	Morocco	3	0	2	1	2	3	−1	2	
4	Spain	3	0	1	2	0	2	−2	1	

Source: FIFA
Rules for classification: Group stage tiebreakers
26 July 2012
14:45

Spain	0–1	Japan
	Report	Ōtsu 34'

Hampden Park, Glasgow
Attendance: 37,726
Referee: Mark Geiger (United States)

29 July 2012
19:45

Spain	0–1	Honduras
	Report	Bengtson 7'

St James' Park, Newcastle
Attendance: 26,523
Referee: Juan Soto (Venezuela)

1 August 2012
17:00

Spain	0–0	Morocco
	Report

Old Trafford, Manchester
Attendance: 35,973
Referee: Ben Williams (Australia)

== Gymnastics ==
=== Artistic ===
Men
Team

Athlete	Event	Qualification								Final							
Athlete	Event	Apparatus						Total	Rank	Apparatus						Total	Rank
Athlete	Event	F	PH	R	V	PB	HB	Total	Rank	F	PH	R	V	PB	HB	Total	Rank
Isaac Botella Pérez	Team	14.033	12.900	—N/a	15.866 Q	—N/a				Did not advance							
Javier Gómez Fuertes	Team	14.833	13.833	13.900	15.958	15.066	14.533	88.123	16 Q	Did not advance							
Fabián González	Team	15.266	14.733	14.033	16.000	13.333	15.000	88.365	15 Q	Did not advance							
Rubén López	Team	—N/a	—N/a	14.900	—N/a	14.733	14.300	—N/a		Did not advance							
Sergio Muñoz	Team	14.600	14.000	13.966	16.000	13.833	13.266	85.665	26	Did not advance							
Total	Team	44.699	42.566	42.899	47.958	43.632	43.833	265.587	9	Did not advance							

Individual finals

Athlete	Event	Apparatus						Total	Rank
Athlete	Event	F	PH	R	V	PB	HB	Total	Rank
Isaac Botella Pérez	Vault	—N/a			15.866	—N/a		15.866	6
Javier Gómez Fuertes	All-around	14.266	12.433	14.800	15.466	14.733	12.733	84.431	23
Fabián González	All-around	14.600	14.733	13.966	16.133	14.400	15.166	88.998	9

Women

Athlete	Event	Qualification						Final					
Athlete	Event	Apparatus				Total	Rank	Apparatus				Total	Rank
Athlete	Event	F	V	UB	BB	Total	Rank	F	V	UB	BB	Total	Rank
Ana María Izurieta	All-around	14.133	14.800	12.600	12.000	53.533	33	Did not advance					

=== Rhythmic ===
Athlete	Event	Qualification						Final					
Athlete	Event	Hoop	Ball	Clubs	Ribbon	Total	Rank	Hoop	Ball	Clubs	Ribbon	Total	Rank
Carolina Rodríguez	Individual	26.900	26.625	27.175	26.100	106.800	14	Did not advance					

Athlete	Event	Qualification				Final			
Athlete	Event	5 balls	3 ribbons 2 hoops	Total	Rank	5 balls	3 ribbons 2 hoops	Total	Rank
Loreto Achaerandio; Sandra Aguilar; Elena López; Lourdes Mohedano; Alejandra Quereda; Lidia Redondo	Team	27.150	27.400	54.550	5 Q	27.400	27.550	54.950	4

== Handball ==
- Men's team event – 1 team of 14 players
- Women's team event – 1 team of 14 players

=== Men's tournament ===
Team roster

The following is the Spain roster in the men's handball tournament of the 2012 Summer Olympics.

Head coaches: Valero Rivera

No.	Pos.	Name	Date of birth (age)	Height	App.	Goals	Club
1	GK	José Javier Hombrados	7 April 1972 (aged 40)	1.96 m			(Spain) Atlético Madrid
3	RB	Eduardo Gurbindo	8 November 1987 (aged 24)	1.95 m			(Spain) BM Valladolid
4	RW	Albert Rocas	16 June 1982 (aged 30)	1.88 m			(Spain) FC Barcelona
5	RB	Jorge Maqueda	6 February 1988 (aged 24)	1.97 m			(Spain) BM Aragón
8	RW	Víctor Tomás	15 February 1985 (aged 27)	1.77 m			(Spain) FC Barcelona
9	CB	Raúl Entrerríos	12 February 1981 (aged 31)	1.93 m			(Spain) FC Barcelona
10	LB	Mikel Aguirrezabalaga	8 April 1984 (aged 28)	1.96 m			(Spain) FC Barcelona
11	CB	Daniel Sarmiento Melián	25 August 1983 (aged 28)	1.88 m			(Spain) FC Barcelona
13	P	Julen Aguinagalde	2 December 1982 (aged 29)	1.96 m			(Spain) Atlético Madrid
15	LW	Cristian Ugalde	19 October 1987 (aged 24)	1.86 m			(Spain) FC Barcelona
16	GK	Árpád Sterbik	20 November 1979 (aged 32)	2.00 m			(Spain) Atlético Madrid
21	CB	Joan Cañellas	30 September 1986 (aged 25)	1.98 m			(Spain) Atlético Madrid
24	LB	Viran Morros	15 December 1983 (aged 28)	1.99 m			(Spain) FC Barcelona
30	P	Gedeón Guardiola	1 October 1984 (aged 27)	1.99 m			(Spain) San Antonio

Group play

Team	Pld	W	D	L	GF	GA	GD	Pts	Qualification
Croatia	5	5	0	0	150	109	+41	10	Quarter-finals
Denmark	5	4	0	1	124	129	−5	8	Quarter-finals
Spain	5	3	0	2	140	126	+14	6	Quarter-finals
Hungary	5	2	0	3	114	128	−14	4	Quarter-finals
Serbia	5	1	0	4	120	131	−11	2	
South Korea	5	0	0	5	115	140	−25	0	

29 July 2012; 16:15	Spain	26 – 21	Serbia	Copper Box, London; Attendance: 4,600; Referees: Abrahamsen, Kristiansen (NOR)
29 July 2012; 16:15	Sarmiento Melián 5	(10–14)	Ilić 6	Copper Box, London; Attendance: 4,600; Referees: Abrahamsen, Kristiansen (NOR)
29 July 2012; 16:15	3× (yellow card) 5× (suspension)	Report	3× (yellow card) 5× (suspension)	Copper Box, London; Attendance: 4,600; Referees: Abrahamsen, Kristiansen (NOR)

31 July 2012; 19:30	Denmark	24 – 23	Spain	Copper Box, London; Attendance: 4,368; Referees: Krstić, Ljubić (SLO)
31 July 2012; 19:30	Hansen 8	(13–12)	three players 4	Copper Box, London; Attendance: 4,368; Referees: Krstić, Ljubić (SLO)
31 July 2012; 19:30	4× (yellow card) 6× (suspension)	Report	4× (yellow card) 1× (suspension)	Copper Box, London; Attendance: 4,368; Referees: Krstić, Ljubić (SLO)

2 August 2012; 09:30	Spain	33 – 29	South Korea	Copper Box, London; Attendance: 4,209; Referees: Lazaar, Reveret (FRA)
2 August 2012; 09:30	Ugalde 6	(16–14)	Lee Jae-woo 8	Copper Box, London; Attendance: 4,209; Referees: Lazaar, Reveret (FRA)
2 August 2012; 09:30	3× (yellow card) 4× (suspension)	Report	2× (yellow card) 8× (suspension)	Copper Box, London; Attendance: 4,209; Referees: Lazaar, Reveret (FRA)

4 August 2012; 21:15	Hungary	22 – 33	Spain	Copper Box, London; Attendance: 4,280; Referees: Horáček, Novotný (CZE)
4 August 2012; 21:15	Nagy 7	(13–16)	Aguinagalde 9	Copper Box, London; Attendance: 4,280; Referees: Horáček, Novotný (CZE)
4 August 2012; 21:15	4× (yellow card) 4× (suspension)	Report	3× (yellow card) 4× (suspension)	Copper Box, London; Attendance: 4,280; Referees: Horáček, Novotný (CZE)

6 August 2012; 19:30	Spain	25 – 30	Croatia	Copper Box, London; Attendance: 4,856; Referees: Geipel, Helbig (GER)
6 August 2012; 19:30	Entrerríos, Tomás 5	(10–11)	Čupić, Lacković 7	Copper Box, London; Attendance: 4,856; Referees: Geipel, Helbig (GER)
6 August 2012; 19:30	3× (yellow card) 3× (suspension)	Report	4× (yellow card) 2× (suspension)	Copper Box, London; Attendance: 4,856; Referees: Geipel, Helbig (GER)

Quarterfinal

8 August 2012; 14:30	Spain	22 – 23	France	Basketball Arena, London; Attendance: 8,890; Referees: Nikolić, Stojković (SRB)
8 August 2012; 14:30	Tomás 6	(12–9)	Accambray 7	Basketball Arena, London; Attendance: 8,890; Referees: Nikolić, Stojković (SRB)
8 August 2012; 14:30	4× (yellow card) 3× (suspension)	Report	4× (yellow card) 3× (suspension)	Basketball Arena, London; Attendance: 8,890; Referees: Nikolić, Stojković (SRB)

=== Women's tournament ===
Team roster

The following is the Spanish roster in the women's handball tournament of the 2012 Summer Olympics.

Head coaches: Jorge Dueñas

No.	Pos.	Name	Date of birth (age)	Height	App.	Goals	Club
2	RW	Marta López	4 February 1990 (aged 22)	1.65 m	0	0	(Spain) BM Alcobendas
3	CB	Andrea Barnó	4 January 1980 (aged 32)	1.75 m	0	0	(Spain) SD Itxako
4	RW	Carmen Martín	29 May 1988 (aged 24)	1.68 m	0	0	(Spain) SD Itxako
6	LB	Nely Carla Alberto	2 July 1983 (aged 29)	1.78 m	0	0	(France) Le Havre AC
7	LB	Beatriz Fernández	19 March 1985 (aged 27)	1.80 m	0	0	(Spain) Bera Bera BM
8	P	Verónica Cuadrado	8 March 1979 (aged 33)	1.84 m	0	0	(Denmark) Randers HK
9	RB	Marta Mangué	23 April 1983 (aged 29)	1.70 m	0	0	(Serbia) RK Zaječar
10	CB	Macarena Aguilar	12 March 1985 (aged 27)	1.70 m	0	0	(Spain) SD Itxako
12	GK	Silvia Navarro	20 March 1979 (aged 33)	1.69 m	0	0	(Spain) SD Itxako
13	RW	Jessica Alonso	20 September 1983 (aged 28)	1.72 m	0	0	(Spain) SD Itxako
17	LW	Elisabeth Pinedo	13 May 1981 (aged 31)	1.75 m	0	0	(Spain) Bera Bera BM
18	P	Begoña Fernández	22 March 1980 (aged 32)	1.80 m	0	0	(Spain) SD Itxako
21	LW	Vanessa Amorós	7 December 1982 (aged 29)	1.67 m	0	0	(Spain) CB Mar Alicante
30	LB	Patricia Elorza	8 April 1984 (aged 28)	1.80 m	0	0	(Spain) Bera Bera BM
39	GK	Mihaela Ciobanu	30 January 1973 (aged 39)	1.75 m	0	0	(Spain) BM Alcobendas

Group play

Team	Pld	W	D	L	GF	GA	GD	Pts	Qualification
France	5	4	1	0	125	103	+22	9	Quarter-finals
South Korea	5	3	1	1	136	130	+6	7	Quarter-finals
Spain	5	3	1	1	119	114	+5	7	Quarter-finals
Norway	5	2	1	2	118	120	−2	5	Quarter-finals
Denmark	5	1	0	4	113	121	−8	2	
Sweden	5	0	0	5	108	131	−23	0	

28 July 2012; 11:15	Spain	27 – 31	South Korea	Copper Box, London; Attendance: 3,900; Referees: Gubica, Milošević (CRO)
28 July 2012; 11:15	Martín 7	(12–16)	Ryu Eun-hee 9	Copper Box, London; Attendance: 3,900; Referees: Gubica, Milošević (CRO)
28 July 2012; 11:15	3× (yellow card) 2× (suspension)	Report	3× (yellow card) 3× (suspension)	Copper Box, London; Attendance: 3,900; Referees: Gubica, Milošević (CRO)

30 July 2012; 16:15	France	18 – 18	Spain	Copper Box, London; Attendance: 4,671; Referees: Horáček, Novotný (CZE)
30 July 2012; 16:15	Dembélé 6	(7–10)	Mangué 6	Copper Box, London; Attendance: 4,671; Referees: Horáček, Novotný (CZE)
30 July 2012; 16:15	3× (yellow card) 6× (suspension) 1× (red card)	Report	4× (yellow card) 4× (suspension)	Copper Box, London; Attendance: 4,671; Referees: Horáček, Novotný (CZE)

1 August 2012; 19:30	Spain	24 – 21	Denmark	Copper Box, London; Attendance: 4,488; Referees: Geipel, Helbig (GER)
1 August 2012; 19:30	Mangué 7	(14–9)	Nørgaard 7	Copper Box, London; Attendance: 4,488; Referees: Geipel, Helbig (GER)
1 August 2012; 19:30	3× (yellow card) 3× (suspension) 1× (red card)	Report	3× (yellow card) 1× (suspension)	Copper Box, London; Attendance: 4,488; Referees: Geipel, Helbig (GER)

3 August 2012; 19:30	Spain	25 – 24	Sweden	Copper Box, London; Attendance: 4,234; Referees: Al-Nuaimi, Omar (UAE)
3 August 2012; 19:30	Mangué, Alberto 6	(11–10)	Fogelström 5	Copper Box, London; Attendance: 4,234; Referees: Al-Nuaimi, Omar (UAE)
3 August 2012; 19:30	3× (yellow card) 3× (suspension)	Report	4× (yellow card) 2× (suspension)	Copper Box, London; Attendance: 4,234; Referees: Al-Nuaimi, Omar (UAE)

5 August 2012; 19:30	Norway	20 – 25	Spain	Copper Box, London; Attendance: 4,345; Referees: Krstić, Ljubić (SLO)
5 August 2012; 19:30	Koren 6	(11–11)	Alonso 7	Copper Box, London; Attendance: 4,345; Referees: Krstić, Ljubić (SLO)
5 August 2012; 19:30	3× (yellow card) 4× (suspension)	Report	3× (yellow card) 4× (suspension) 1× (red card)	Copper Box, London; Attendance: 4,345; Referees: Krstić, Ljubić (SLO)

Quarterfinal

7 August 2012; 13:30	Spain	25 – 22	Croatia	Copper Box, London; Attendance: 4,553; Referees: Horáček, Novotný (CZE)
7 August 2012; 13:30	Pinedo 7	(13–12)	Tatari 5	Copper Box, London; Attendance: 4,553; Referees: Horáček, Novotný (CZE)
7 August 2012; 13:30	3× (yellow card) 3× (suspension)	Report	3× (yellow card) 6× (suspension)	Copper Box, London; Attendance: 4,553; Referees: Horáček, Novotný (CZE)

Semifinal

9 August 2012; 20:30	Spain	26 – 27	Montenegro	Basketball Arena, London; Attendance: 9,087; Referees: Krstić, Ljubić (SLO)
9 August 2012; 20:30	Alberto 6	(13–13)	Bulatović 9	Basketball Arena, London; Attendance: 9,087; Referees: Krstić, Ljubić (SLO)
9 August 2012; 20:30	2× (yellow card) 1× (suspension)	Report	3× (yellow card) 4× (suspension)	Basketball Arena, London; Attendance: 9,087; Referees: Krstić, Ljubić (SLO)

Bronze medal game

11 August 2012
17:00
South Korea
29 – 31 (ET)
Spain
Basketball Arena, London
Attendance: 9,622
Referees: Olesen, Pedersen (DEN)
Gwon Han-na 7
(13–13)
Alberto, Fernández 5
1× (yellow card) 2× (suspension)
Report
2× (yellow card) 4× (suspension)

FT: 24–24 ET: 4–4, 1–3

== Judo ==
Men

Athlete	Event	Round of 64	Round of 32	Round of 16	Quarterfinals	Semifinals	Repechage	Final / BM	
Athlete	Event	Opposition Result	Opposition Result	Opposition Result	Opposition Result	Opposition Result	Opposition Result	Opposition Result	Rank
Sugoi Uriarte	−66 kg	Faraldo (ITA); W 0100–0000	Mata (ARU); W 0100–0000	García (AND); W 0013–0002	Karimov (AZE); W 0021–0001	Ungvári (HUN); L 0000–0011	Bye	Cho J-H (KOR); L 0001–0000	5
Kiyoshi Uematsu	−73 kg	Bye	Isaev (RUS); L 0002–0011	Did not advance					

Women

Athlete	Event	Round of 32	Round of 16	Quarterfinals	Semifinals	Repechage	Final / BM	
Athlete	Event	Opposition Result	Opposition Result	Opposition Result	Opposition Result	Opposition Result	Opposition Result	Rank
Oiana Blanco	−48 kg	Fukumi (JPN); L 0001–0100	Did not advance					
Ana Carrascosa	−52 kg	Müller (LUX); L 0000–0201	Did not advance					
Concepción Bellorín	−57 kg	Karakas (HUN); L 0011–0100	Did not advance					
Cecilia Blanco	−70 kg	Smal (UKR); W 0110–0002	Sraka (SLO); L 0011–0000	Did not advance				

== Sailing ==
Spain qualified 1 boat for each of the following events

Men

Athlete	Event	Race											Net points	Final rank
Athlete	Event	1	2	3	4	5	6	7	8	9	10	M*	Net points	Final rank
Iván Pastor	RS:X	22	24	20	~~39~~	19	25	8	25	2	5	EL	150	16
Javier Hernández	Laser	~~34~~	17	13	15	26	13	6	17	2	9	EL	118	12
Rafael Trujillo	Finn	12	12	12	~~23~~	7	4	15	1	13	4	6	109	8
Onán Barreiros; Aarón Sarmiento	470	7	8	12	~~27~~	24	6	10	13	15	9	EL	104	11

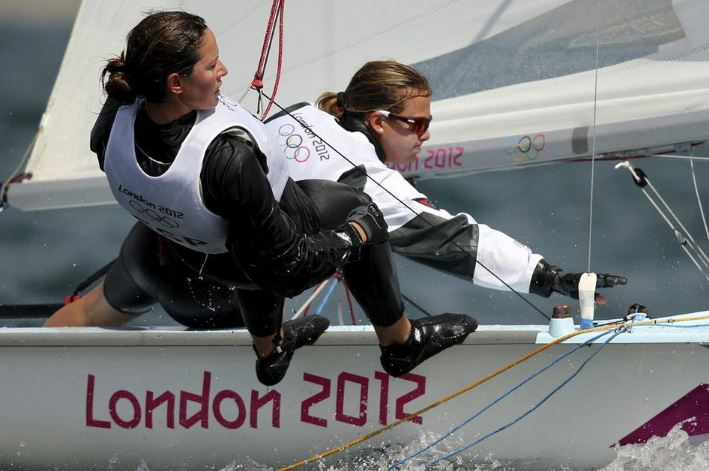
Sailors Berta Betanzos and Tara Pacheco in women's 470 class

Women

Athlete	Event	Race											Net points	Final rank
Athlete	Event	1	2	3	4	5	6	7	8	9	10	M*	Net points	Final rank
Marina Alabau	RS:X	2	1	1	1	5	2	3	~~8~~	6	3	2	26	1st place, gold medalist(s)
Alicia Cebrián	Laser Radial	15	11	14	9	~~24~~	23	5	9	2	13	EL	101	11
Berta Betanzos; Tara Pacheco	470	15	14	8	~~16~~	13	8	11	4	7	13	8	101	10

Match racing

Athlete	Event	Round Robin											Rank	Knockouts			Rank
Athlete	Event	GBR	USA	NZL	RUS	NED	SWE	FRA	FIN	AUS	POR	DEN	Rank	Q-final	S-final	Final	Rank
Támara Echegoyen; Ángela Pumariega; Sofía Toro	Elliott 6m	W	W	W	L	W	W	W	L	L	W	W	3 Q	FRA; W (3–0)	RUS; W (2–1)	AUS; W (3–2)	1st place, gold medalist(s)

Open

Athlete	Event	Race																Net points	Final rank
Athlete	Event	1	2	3	4	5	6	7	8	9	10	11	12	13	14	15	M*	Net points	Final rank
Xabier Fernández; Iker Martínez	49er	15	6	7	3	14	~~18~~	3	15	12	14	8	14	8	15	12	EL	146	12

M = Medal race; EL = Eliminated – did not advance into the medal race;

== Shooting ==
Spain qualified for 8 quota places in shooting events;

Men

Athlete	Event	Qualification		Final	
Athlete	Event	Points	Rank	Points	Rank
Juan José Aramburu	Skeet	115	23	Did not advance	
Pablo Carrera	50 m pistol	554	22	Did not advance	
Pablo Carrera	10 m air pistol	585	4 Q	683.3	6
Alberto Fernández	Trap	116	25	Did not advance	
Jorge Llames	25 m rapid fire pistol	579	11	Did not advance	
Javier López	50 m rifle 3 positions	1151	36	Did not advance	
Javier López	50 m rifle prone	589	35	Did not advance	
Javier López	10 m air rifle	88	41	Did not advance	
Jesús Serrano	Trap	123	3 Q	144	5

Women

Athlete	Event	Qualification		Final	
Athlete	Event	Points	Rank	Points	Rank
Sonia Franquet	25 m pistol	579	22	Did not advance	
Sonia Franquet	10 m air pistol	378	26	Did not advance	
Fátima Gálvez	Trap	70	6 Q	87	5

== Swimming ==
Spanish swimmers achieved qualifying standards in the following events (up to a maximum of 2 swimmers in each event at the Olympic Qualifying Time (OQT), and 1 at the Olympic Selection Time (OST)):

Men

Athlete	Event	Heat		Semifinal		Final	
Athlete	Event	Time	Rank	Time	Rank	Time	Rank
Francisco Hervás Jódar	10 km open water	—N/a				1:53:27.8	23
Juan Miguel Rando	100 m backstroke	54.93	25	Did not advance			
Aschwin Wildeboer	100 m backstroke	54.36	16 Q	53.99	12	Did not advance	
Aschwin Wildeboer	200 m backstroke	2:00.02	26	Did not advance			

Women

Athlete	Event	Heat		Semifinal		Final	
Athlete	Event	Time	Rank	Time	Rank	Time	Rank
Concepción Badillo	100 m breaststroke	1:12.58	39	Did not advance			
Mireia Belmonte	400 m freestyle	4:08.23	13	—N/a		Did not advance	
Mireia Belmonte	800 m freestyle	8:25.26	4 Q	—N/a		8:18.76 NR	2nd place, silver medalist(s)
Mireia Belmonte	200 m butterfly	2:08.19	9 Q	2:06.62	4 Q	2:05.25 NR	2nd place, silver medalist(s)
Mireia Belmonte	200 m individual medley	2:11.73	6 Q	2:11.54	10	Did not advance	
Mireia Belmonte	400 m individual medley	4:34.70	5 Q	—N/a		4:35.62	8
Melania Costa	200 m freestyle	1:57.79	=4 Q	1:57.76	9	Did not advance	
Melania Costa	400 m freestyle	4:06.75	9	—N/a		Did not advance	
Duane da Rocha	100 m backstroke	1:00.57	18	Did not advance			
Duane da Rocha	200 m backstroke	2:09.72	10 Q	2:09.88	13	Did not advance	
Claudia Dasca	400 m individual medley	4:46.80	25	—N/a		Did not advance	
Marina García	100 m breaststroke	1:08.64	25	Did not advance			
Marina García	200 m breaststroke	2:27.57	20	Did not advance			
Beatriz Gómez Cortes	200 m individual medley	2:13.93	15 Q	2:15.12	16	Did not advance	
Judit Ignacio Sorribes	100 m butterfly	59.42	=26	Did not advance			
Judit Ignacio Sorribes	200 m butterfly	2:08.14	7 Q	2:08.96	15	Did not advance	
Erika Villaécija	800 m freestyle	8:27.99	10	—N/a		Did not advance	
Erika Villaécija	10 km open water	—N/a				1:58:49.5	8
Mireia Belmonte; Patricia Castro; Melania Costa; Lydia Morant	4 × 200 m freestyle relay	7:54.59 NR	10	—N/a		Did not advance	
Melania Costa; Duane da Rocha; Marina García; Judit Ignacio Sorribes	4 × 100 m medley relay	4:03.05 NR	13	—N/a		Did not advance	

== Synchronized swimming ==
Spain qualified 9 quota places in synchronized swimming at the 2012 Olympics.

Athlete	Event	Technical routine		Free routine (preliminary)			Free routine (final)		
Athlete	Event	Points	Rank	Points	Total (technical + free)	Rank	Points	Total (technical + free)	Rank
Ona Carbonell; Andrea Fuentes	Duet	96.000	3	96.590	192.590	3 Q	96.900	192.900	2nd place, silver medalist(s)
Clara Basiana; Alba Cabello; Ona Carbonell; Margalida Crespí; Andrea Fuentes; Thaïs Henríquez; Paula Klamburg; Irene Montrucchio; Laia Pons	Team	96.200	3	—N/a			96.920	193.120	3rd place, bronze medalist(s)

== Table tennis ==
Spain qualified two athlete for singles table tennis events. Shen Yanfei qualified for the women's event based on the 2011 world rankings. On 14 April 2012, He Zhi Wen qualified in the European Qualification Tournament for the men's event, and on 14 May 2012 at the World Olympic Qualification Tournament in Doha, Carlos Machado for the men's event; Galia Dvorak and Sara Ramírez completed the Spanish team for the women's team event, and one of them played the women's event too.

Athlete	Event	Preliminary round	Round 1	Round 2	Round 3	Round 4	Quarterfinals	Semifinals	Final / BM	
Athlete	Event	Opposition Result	Opposition Result	Opposition Result	Opposition Result	Opposition Result	Opposition Result	Opposition Result	Opposition Result	Rank
He Zhi Wen	Men's singles	Bye		Wang (POL); W 4–1	Crișan (ROU); L 2–4	Did not advance				
Carlos Machado	Men's singles	Bye	Aruna (NGR); L 2–4	Did not advance						
Sara Ramírez	Women's singles	Bye	Das (IND); W 4–1	Pesotska (UKR); L 1–4	Did not advance					
Shen Yanfei	Women's singles	Bye			Li X (FRA); W 4–0	Kim K-A (KOR); L 1–4	Did not advance			
Galia Dvorak; Sara Ramírez; Shen Yanfei	Women's team	—N/a				China; L 0–3	Did not advance			

== Taekwondo ==
Athlete	Event	Round of 16	Quarterfinals	Semifinals	Repechage	Bronze Medal	Final	
Athlete	Event	Opposition Result	Opposition Result	Opposition Result	Opposition Result	Opposition Result	Opposition Result	Rank
Joel González	Men's −58 kg	Sanli (SWE); W 7–6	Khalil (AUS); W 5–3	Muñoz (COL); W 13–4	Bye		Lee D-H (KOR); W 17–8	1st place, gold medalist(s)
Nicolás García	Men's −80 kg	Karami (IRI); W 8–2	Muhammad (GBR); W 7–3	Sarmiento (ITA); W 2–1	Bye		Crismanich (ARG); L 0–1	2nd place, silver medalist(s)
Brigitte Yagüe	Women's −49 kg	Carstens (PAN); W 7–2	Alegría (MEX); W 8–0	Sonkham (THA); W 10–9	Bye		Wu Jy (CHN); L 1–8	2nd place, silver medalist(s)

== Tennis ==
Spain qualified 12 players. The final list was announced on 11 June 2012.

Men

Athlete	Event	Round of 64	Round of 32	Round of 16	Quarterfinals	Semifinals	Final / BM	
Athlete	Event	Opposition Score	Opposition Score	Opposition Score	Opposition Score	Opposition Score	Opposition Score	Rank
Nicolás Almagro	Singles	Troicki (SRB); W 6–4, 7–6^{(7–3)}	Bogomolov Jr. (RUS); W 6–2, 6–2	Darcis (BEL); W 7–5, 6–3	A Murray (GBR); L 4–6, 1–6	Did not advance		
David Ferrer	Singles	Pospisil (CAN); W 6–4, 6–4	Kavčič (SLO); W 6–2, 6–2	Nishikori (JPN); L 0–6, 6–3, 4–6	Did not advance			
Feliciano López	Singles	Tursunov (RUS); W 6–7^{(5–7)}, 6–2– 9–7	Mónaco (ARG); W 6–4, 6–4	Tsonga (FRA); L 6–7, 4–6	Did not advance			
Fernando Verdasco	Singles	Istomin (UZB); L 4–6, 6–7^{(9–11)}	Did not advance					
David Ferrer; Feliciano López	Doubles	—N/a	Fyrstenberg / Matkowski (POL); W 7–6^{(9–7)}, 6–7^{(6–8)}, 8–6	Melzer / Peya (AUT); W 6–3, 3–6, 11–9	Čilić / Dodig (CRO); W 6–4, 6–4	Llodra / Tsonga (FRA); L 3–6, 6–4, 16–18	Benneteau / Gasquet (FRA); L 6–7^{(4–7)}, 2–6	4
Marcel Granollers; Marc López	Doubles	—N/a	Erlich / Ram (ISR); L 6–7^{(5–7)}, 6–7^{(3–7)}	Did not advance				

Women

Athlete	Event	Round of 64	Round of 32	Round of 16	Quarterfinals	Semifinals	Final / BM	
Athlete	Event	Opposition Score	Opposition Score	Opposition Score	Opposition Score	Opposition Score	Opposition Score	Rank
María José Martínez Sánchez	Singles	Hercog (SLO); W 6–2, 6–4	Azarenka (BLR); L 1–6, 2–6	Did not advance				
Anabel Medina Garrigues	Singles	Wickmayer (BEL); L 2–6, 6–4, 5–7	Did not advance					
Carla Suárez Navarro	Singles	Stosur (AUS); W 3–6, 7–5, 10–8	Clijsters (BEL); L 3–6, 3–6	Did not advance				
Sílvia Soler Espinosa	Singles	Watson (GBR); L 2–6, 2–6	Did not advance					
Nuria Llagostera Vives; María José Martínez Sánchez	Doubles	—N/a	Dellacqua / Stosur (AUS); W 6–1, 6–1	Peng S / Zheng J (CHN); L 4–6, 2–6	Did not advance			
Anabel Medina Garrigues; Arantxa Parra Santonja	Doubles	—N/a	Pennetta / Schiavone (ITA); L 6–7, 4–6	Did not advance				

== Triathlon ==
Spain qualified six athletes, the maximum as possible.

Athlete	Event	Swim (1.5 km)	Trans 1	Bike (40 km)	Trans 2	Run (10 km)	Total Time	Rank
Mario Mola	Men's	18:09	0:38	59:40	0:29	30:27	1:49:23	19
Javier Gómez Noya	Men's	17:00	0:36	59:16	0:28	29:16	1:46:36	2nd place, silver medalist(s)
José Miguel Pérez	Men's	18:07	0:40	59:40	0:29	30:57	1:49:53	24
Marina Damlaimcourt	Women's	19:20	0:44	1:05:36	0:30	36:40	2:02:50	24
Ainhoa Murúa	Women's	19:21	0:39	1:05:37	0:32	34:47	2:00:56	7
Zuriñe Rodríguez	Women's	19:49	0:42	1:06:56	0:36	40:41	2:08:44	44

== Volleyball ==
=== Beach ===
Athlete	Event	Preliminary round	Standing	Round of 16	Quarterfinals	Semifinals	Final / BM	
Athlete	Event	Opposition Score	Standing	Opposition Score	Opposition Score	Opposition Score	Opposition Score	Rank
Adrián Gavira; Pablo Herrera	Men's	Pool B Beneš – Kubala (CZE); W 2 – 0 (25–23, 21–16); Dalhausser – Rogers (USA); L 1 – 2 (21–18, 16–21, 13–15); Asahi – Shiratori (JPN); W 2 – 0 (21–19, 22–20)	2 Q	Santos – Cunha (BRA); L 0 – 2 (18–21, 19–21)	Did not advance			9
Elsa Baquerizo; Liliana Fernández	Women's	Pool D Keizer – van Iersel (NED); W 2 – 1 (14–21, 21–16, 15–11); Gallay – Zonta (ARG); W 2 – 0 (22–20, 21–16); Kessy – Ross (USA); L 1 – 2 (19–21, 21–19, 17–19)	2 Q	Menegatti – Cicolari (ITA); L 0 – 2 (15–21, 15–21)	Did not advance			9

== Water polo ==
Spain qualified a team to both the men's and the women's tournaments.

=== Men's tournament ===
Team roster

The following is the Spanish roster in the men's water polo tournament of the 2012 Summer Olympics.

№	Name	Pos.	Height	Weight	Date of birth	2012 club
1	Iñaki Aguilar	GK	1.89 m (6 ft 2 in)	82 kg (181 lb)	9 September 1983	(Spain) CN Sabadell
2	Mario José García	D	1.90 m (6 ft 3 in)	91 kg (201 lb)	15 July 1983	(Spain) Real Canoe
3	David Martín	D	1.77 m (5 ft 10 in)	78 kg (172 lb)	2 January 1977	(Spain) CN Atlètic-Barceloneta
4	Balázs Szirányi	CF	1.96 m (6 ft 5 in)	108 kg (238 lb)	10 January 1983	(Spain) Real Canoe
5	Guillermo Molina	CF	1.94 m (6 ft 4 in)	108 kg (238 lb)	16 March 1984	(Italy) Pro Recco
6	Marc Minguell	CF	1.86 m (6 ft 1 in)	95 kg (209 lb)	14 January 1985	(Italy) Posillipo
7	Blai Mallarach	CF	1.87 m (6 ft 2 in)	87 kg (192 lb)	21 August 1987	(Croatia) HAVK Mladost
8	Albert Español	D	1.89 m (6 ft 2 in)	86 kg (190 lb)	29 October 1986	(Spain) CN Atlètic-Barceloneta
9	Xavier Vallès	CF	1.91 m (6 ft 3 in)	94 kg (207 lb)	4 September 1979	(Spain) CN Atlètic-Barceloneta
10	Felipe Perrone	D	1.83 m (6 ft 0 in)	95 kg (209 lb)	27 February 1986	(Italy) Pro Recco
11	Iván Pérez	CF	1.97 m (6 ft 6 in)	109 kg (240 lb)	29 June 1971	(Spain) CN Sabadell
12	Xavier García	CF	1.98 m (6 ft 6 in)	92 kg (203 lb)	5 January 1984	(Croatia) VK Primorje Rijeka
13	Daniel López	GK	1.91 m (6 ft 3 in)	87 kg (192 lb)	16 July 1980	(Spain) CN Atlètic-Barceloneta

Head coach: Rafael Aguilar

Group play

Team	Pld	W	D	L	GF	GA	GD	Pts	Qualification
Croatia	5	5	0	0	50	29	+21	10	Quarterfinals
Italy	5	3	1	1	40	36	+4	7	Quarterfinals
Spain	5	3	0	2	52	42	+10	6	Quarterfinals
Australia	5	2	0	3	40	44	−4	4	Quarterfinals
Greece	5	1	1	3	41	43	−2	3	
Kazakhstan	5	0	0	5	24	53	−29	0	

29 July 2012; 11:20	Report	Kazakhstan	6–14	Spain	Water Polo Arena, London; Referees: Marijo Brguljan (MNE), Ulrich Spiegel (GER)
29 July 2012; 11:20	Report	Score by quarters: 2–4, 1–5, 1–3, 2–2			Water Polo Arena, London; Referees: Marijo Brguljan (MNE), Ulrich Spiegel (GER)
29 July 2012; 11:20	Report	Gubarev, Ushakov 2	Goals	Perrone 5	Water Polo Arena, London; Referees: Marijo Brguljan (MNE), Ulrich Spiegel (GER)

31 July 2012; 11:20	Report	Croatia	8–7	Spain	Water Polo Arena, London; Referees: Boris Margeta (SLO), Radoslaw Koryzna (POL)
31 July 2012; 11:20	Report	Score by quarters: 2–1, 3–2, 2–4, 1–0			Water Polo Arena, London; Referees: Boris Margeta (SLO), Radoslaw Koryzna (POL)
31 July 2012; 11:20	Report	Sukno, Dobud 2	Goals	Español 4	Water Polo Arena, London; Referees: Boris Margeta (SLO), Radoslaw Koryzna (POL)

2 August 2012; 10:00	Report	Spain	13–9	Australia	Water Polo Arena, London; Referees: Mihajlo Ćirić (SRB), Steven Rotsart (USA)
2 August 2012; 10:00	Report	Score by quarters: 2–1, 3–3, 4–1, 4–4			Water Polo Arena, London; Referees: Mihajlo Ćirić (SRB), Steven Rotsart (USA)
2 August 2012; 10:00	Report	three players 2	Goals	Miller 5	Water Polo Arena, London; Referees: Mihajlo Ćirić (SRB), Steven Rotsart (USA)

4 August 2012; 14:10	Report	Greece	9–11	Spain	Water Polo Arena, London; Referees: Marijo Brguljan (MNE), Adrian Alexandrescu (ROU)
4 August 2012; 14:10	Report	Score by quarters: 3–4, 2–4, 2–1, 2–2			Water Polo Arena, London; Referees: Marijo Brguljan (MNE), Adrian Alexandrescu (ROU)
4 August 2012; 14:10	Report	Delakas 3	Goals	three players 3	Water Polo Arena, London; Referees: Marijo Brguljan (MNE), Adrian Alexandrescu (ROU)

6 August 2012; 19:40	Report	Spain	7–10	Italy	Water Polo Arena, London; Referees: Adrian Alexandrescu (ROU), Dragan Stampalija (CRO)
6 August 2012; 19:40	Report	Score by quarters: 0–2, 3–4, 1–2, 3–2			Water Polo Arena, London; Referees: Adrian Alexandrescu (ROU), Dragan Stampalija (CRO)
6 August 2012; 19:40	Report	Español 3	Goals	Premuš 3	Water Polo Arena, London; Referees: Adrian Alexandrescu (ROU), Dragan Stampalija (CRO)

Quarterfinal

8 August 2012; 14:30	Report	Spain	9–11	Montenegro	Water Polo Arena, London; Referees: Adrian Alexandrescu (ROU), Ulrich Spiegel (GER)
8 August 2012; 14:30	Report	Score by quarters: 4–4, 1–3, 1–3, 3–1			Water Polo Arena, London; Referees: Adrian Alexandrescu (ROU), Ulrich Spiegel (GER)
8 August 2012; 14:30	Report	Vallès, Minguell 2	Goals	Zloković 4	Water Polo Arena, London; Referees: Adrian Alexandrescu (ROU), Ulrich Spiegel (GER)

Classification semifinal

10 August 2012; 14:20	Report	United States	7–8	Spain	Water Polo Arena, London; Referees: Marijo Brguljan (CRO), Gyorgy Juhasz (HUN)
10 August 2012; 14:20	Report	Score by quarters: 1–3, 1–2, 2–1, 3–2			Water Polo Arena, London; Referees: Marijo Brguljan (CRO), Gyorgy Juhasz (HUN)
10 August 2012; 14:20	Report	Powers, Beaubien 2	Goals	Perrone 3	Water Polo Arena, London; Referees: Marijo Brguljan (CRO), Gyorgy Juhasz (HUN)

5th place game

12 August 2012; 11:40	Report	Spain	8–14	Hungary	Water Polo Arena, London; Referees: Marijo Brguljan (MNE), Alan Balfanbayev (KAZ)
12 August 2012; 11:40	Report	Score by quarters: 1–4, 2–3, 1–5, 4–2			Water Polo Arena, London; Referees: Marijo Brguljan (MNE), Alan Balfanbayev (KAZ)
12 August 2012; 11:40	Report	Minguell 3	Goals	six players 2	Water Polo Arena, London; Referees: Marijo Brguljan (MNE), Alan Balfanbayev (KAZ)

=== Women's tournament ===
Team roster

The following is the Spanish roster in the women's water polo tournament of the 2012 Summer Olympics.

№	Name	Pos.	Height	Weight	Date of birth	2012 club
1	Laura Ester	GK	1.70 m (5 ft 7 in)	56 kg (123 lb)	22 January 1990	(Spain) CN Sabadell
2	Marta Bach	CB	1.76 m (5 ft 9 in)	66 kg (146 lb)	17 February 1993	(Spain) CN Mataro
3	Anna Espar	D	1.80 m (5 ft 11 in)	66 kg (146 lb)	8 January 1993	(Spain) CN Sabadell
4	Roser Tarragó	D	1.70 m (5 ft 7 in)	59 kg (130 lb)	25 March 1993	(Spain) CN Mataro
5	Matilde Ortiz	CB	1.74 m (5 ft 9 in)	64 kg (141 lb)	16 September 1990	(Spain) CN Sabadell
6	Jennifer Pareja	D	1.74 m (5 ft 9 in)	63 kg (139 lb)	8 May 1984	(Spain) CN Sabadell
7	Lorena Miranda	CB	1.74 m (5 ft 9 in)	73 kg (161 lb)	7 April 1991	(Spain) CW Dos Hermanas
8	Pilar Peña Carrasco	D	1.72 m (5 ft 8 in)	61 kg (134 lb)	4 April 1986	(Spain) CN Sabadell
9	Andrea Blas	CF	1.73 m (5 ft 8 in)	81 kg (179 lb)	14 February 1992	(Spain) EW Zaragoza
10	Ona Meseguer	D	1.67 m (5 ft 6 in)	62 kg (137 lb)	1 March 1978	(Spain) CN Sant Andreu
11	Maica García Godoy	CF	1.88 m (6 ft 2 in)	90 kg (198 lb)	17 October 1990	(Spain) CN Sabadell
12	Laura López	D	1.70 m (5 ft 7 in)	63 kg (139 lb)	13 January 1988	(Spain) CN Madrid Moscardo
13	Ana Copado	GK	1.80 m (5 ft 11 in)	70 kg (154 lb)	31 March 1980	(Spain) CN Sant Andreu

Head coach: Miki Oca

Group play

Team	Pld	W	D	L	GF	GA	GD	Pts
Spain	3	2	1	0	33	26	+7	5
United States	3	2	1	0	30	28	+2	5
Hungary	3	1	0	2	35	37	−2	2
China	3	0	0	3	22	29	−7	0

30 July 2012; 14:10	Report	Spain	11–6	China	Water Polo Arena, London; Referees: Alan Balfanbayev (KAZ), Cory Williams (NZL)
30 July 2012; 14:10	Report	Score by quarters: 2–2, 4–2, 4–2, 1–0			Water Polo Arena, London; Referees: Alan Balfanbayev (KAZ), Cory Williams (NZL)
30 July 2012; 14:10	Report	Espar 3	Goals	Ma Huanhuan 3	Water Polo Arena, London; Referees: Alan Balfanbayev (KAZ), Cory Williams (NZL)

1 August 2012; 18:20	Report	Spain	9–9	United States	Water Polo Arena, London; Referees: Marie Deslieres (CAN), Anton Bervoets (NED)
1 August 2012; 18:20	Report	Score by quarters: 3–1, 2–2, 1–4, 3–2			Water Polo Arena, London; Referees: Marie Deslieres (CAN), Anton Bervoets (NED)
1 August 2012; 18:20	Report	Pareja 4	Goals	Craig 4	Water Polo Arena, London; Referees: Marie Deslieres (CAN), Anton Bervoets (NED)

3 August 2012; 14:10	Report	Spain	13–11	Hungary	Water Polo Arena, London; Referees: Massimiliano Caputi (ITA), Svetlana Dreval (RUS)
3 August 2012; 14:10	Report	Score by quarters: 4–3, 3–2, 3–2, 3–4			Water Polo Arena, London; Referees: Massimiliano Caputi (ITA), Svetlana Dreval (RUS)
3 August 2012; 14:10	Report	Espar 3	Goals	Antal 4	Water Polo Arena, London; Referees: Massimiliano Caputi (ITA), Svetlana Dreval (RUS)

Quarterfinal

5 August 2012; 20:20	Report	Spain	9–7	Great Britain	Water Polo Arena, London; Referees: Cory Williams (NZL), Gus Pinker (RSA)
5 August 2012; 20:20	Report	Score by quarters: 3–2, 3–0, 2–3, 1–2			Water Polo Arena, London; Referees: Cory Williams (NZL), Gus Pinker (RSA)
5 August 2012; 20:20	Report	Miranda, Espar 2	Goals	Painter-Snell 3	Water Polo Arena, London; Referees: Cory Williams (NZL), Gus Pinker (RSA)

Semifinal

7 August 2012; 19:40	Report	Hungary	9–10	Spain	Water Polo Arena, London; Referees: Dragan Stampalija (CRO), Massimiliano Caputi (ITA)
7 August 2012; 19:40	Report	Score by quarters: 1–2, 4–5, 2–2, 2–1			Water Polo Arena, London; Referees: Dragan Stampalija (CRO), Massimiliano Caputi (ITA)
7 August 2012; 19:40	Report	three players 2	Goals	Espar 4	Water Polo Arena, London; Referees: Dragan Stampalija (CRO), Massimiliano Caputi (ITA)

Gold medal game

9 August 2012; 20:25	Report	(gold) United States	8–5	Spain (silver)	Water Polo Arena, London; Referees: Marie Deslieres (CAN), Georgios Stavridis (GRE)
9 August 2012; 20:25	Report	Score by quarters: 1–1, 4–1, 2–0, 1–3			Water Polo Arena, London; Referees: Marie Deslieres (CAN), Georgios Stavridis (GRE)
9 August 2012; 20:25	Report	Steffens 5	Goals	Pareja 3	Water Polo Arena, London; Referees: Marie Deslieres (CAN), Georgios Stavridis (GRE)

== Weightlifting ==
Spain qualified 1 man and 1 woman.

Athlete	Event	Snatch		Clean & Jerk		Total	Rank
Athlete	Event	Result	Rank	Result	Rank	Total	Rank
Andrés Mata	Men's −77 kg	150	8	188	6	338	6
Lydia Valentín	Women's −75 kg	120	1	145	1	265	1st place, gold medalist(s)

== Wrestling ==
Key:

- VT – Victory by Fall.
- PP – Decision by Points – the loser with technical points.
- PO – Decision by Points – the loser without technical points.

Women's freestyle

Athlete	Event	Qualification	Round of 16	Quarterfinal	Semifinal	Repechage 1	Repechage 2	Final / BM	
Athlete	Event	Opposition Result	Opposition Result	Opposition Result	Opposition Result	Opposition Result	Opposition Result	Opposition Result	Rank
Maider Unda	−72 kg	Bye	Betancur (COL); W 3–0 ^{PO}	Ochirbat (MGL); W 3–1 ^{PP}	Zlateva (BUL); L 0–3 ^{PO}	Bye		Marzaliuk (BLR); W 3–0 ^{PO}	3rd place, bronze medalist(s)

== Uniform controversy ==
As Spain was suffering from the 2008–2014 financial crisis, the Spanish Olympic team saved EUR1.5 million by obtaining free uniforms for the opening ceremony from the Russian sportswear company Bosco, which was a team sponsor and also provided the Russian and Ukrainian teams' outfits. Spanish athletes criticized the outfits' appearance as "loud, very loud", however, saying that "there aren't enough adjectives". The Moscow Times described the uniforms' colors as "a never-before-seen mix of cherry red, orange and canary yellow", and NPR stated that the outfits appeared designed for Ronald McDonald.

== See also ==
- Spain at the 2012 Summer Paralympics
