= Field hockey at the 2012 Summer Olympics – Men's team squads =

Twelve national teams competed in the men's Olympic field hockey tournament at the 2012 Summer Olympics in London. Sixteen players were officially enrolled in each squad. Two reserve players could also be nominated to be available should a player enrolled in the official squad become injured during the tournament.

== Pool A ==
=== Australia ===
The following is the Australian roster in the men's field hockey tournament of the 2012 Summer Olympics.

Head Coach: Ric Charlesworth

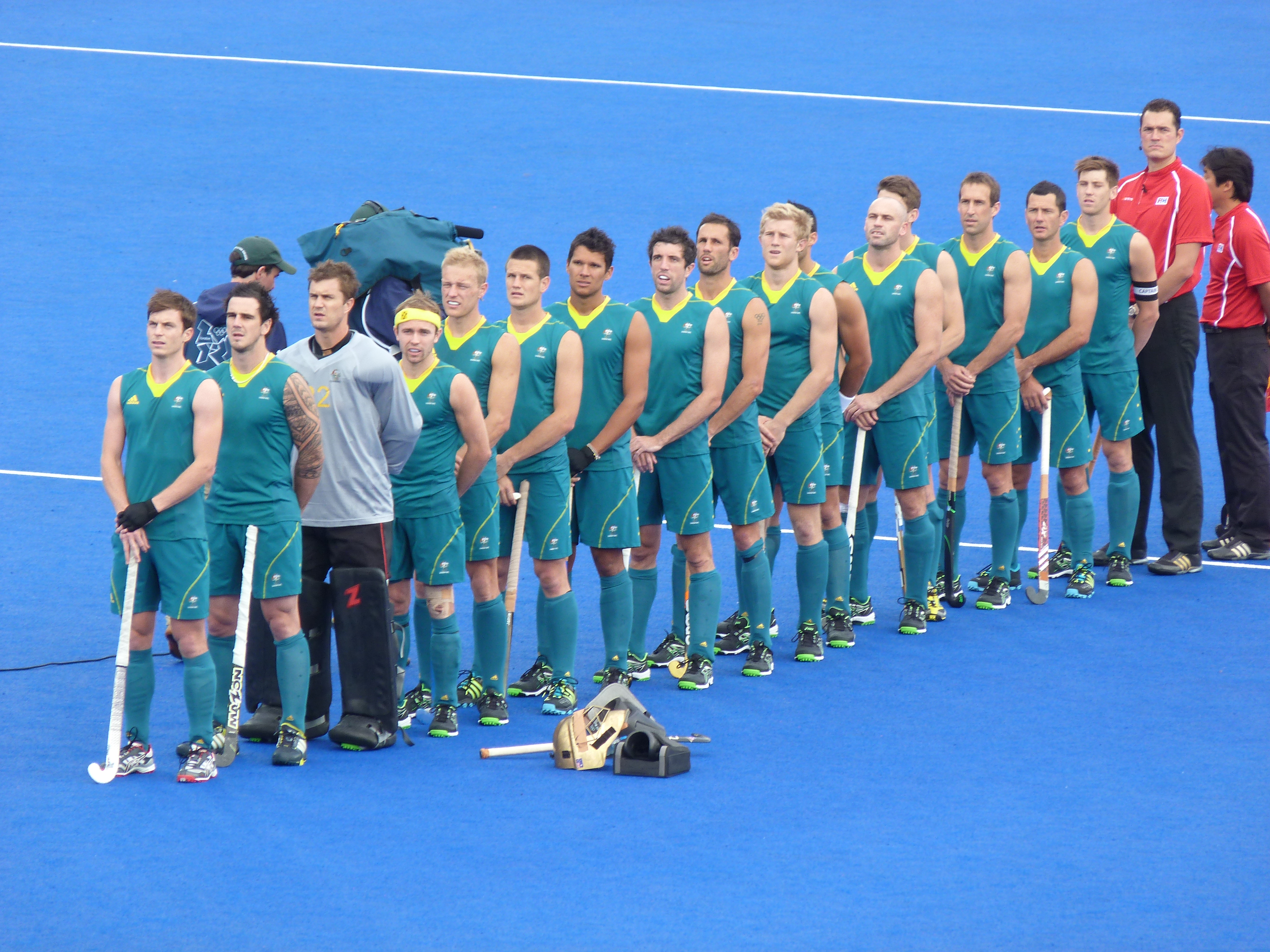
Australia national field hockey team before their game with Spain in the 2012 Olympics.

1. Jamie Dwyer (Vice-captain)
2. Liam de Young (Vice-captain)
3. Simon Orchard
4. Glenn Turner
5. Chris Ciriello
8. Matthew Butturini
9. Mark Knowles (C)
10. Russell Ford *
11. Eddie Ockenden
15. Joel Carroll
16. Matthew Gohdes
19. Tim Deavin
20. Matthew Swann
22. Nathan Burgers (GK)
27. Kieran Govers
31. Fergus Kavanagh

Reserves:

- Kiel Brown
- Andrew Charter (GK)

=== Great Britain ===
The following is the Great Britain roster in the men's field hockey tournament of the 2012 Summer Olympics.

Head Coach: Jason Lee

4. Glenn Kirkham
7. Ashley Jackson
9. Harry Martin
10. Matthew Daly
12. Jonty Clarke
13. Robert Moore
14. Ben Hawes
17. Alastair Wilson
18. Barry Middleton (C)
20. James Tindall
23. Iain Mackay
24. Iain Lewers
25. James Fair (GK)
26. Nicholas Catlin
27. Daniel Fox
29. Richard Smith

Reserves:

- Richard Mantell
- George Pinner (GK)

=== Spain ===
The following is the Spain roster in the men's field hockey tournament of the 2012 Summer Olympics.

Head Coach: Dani Martín

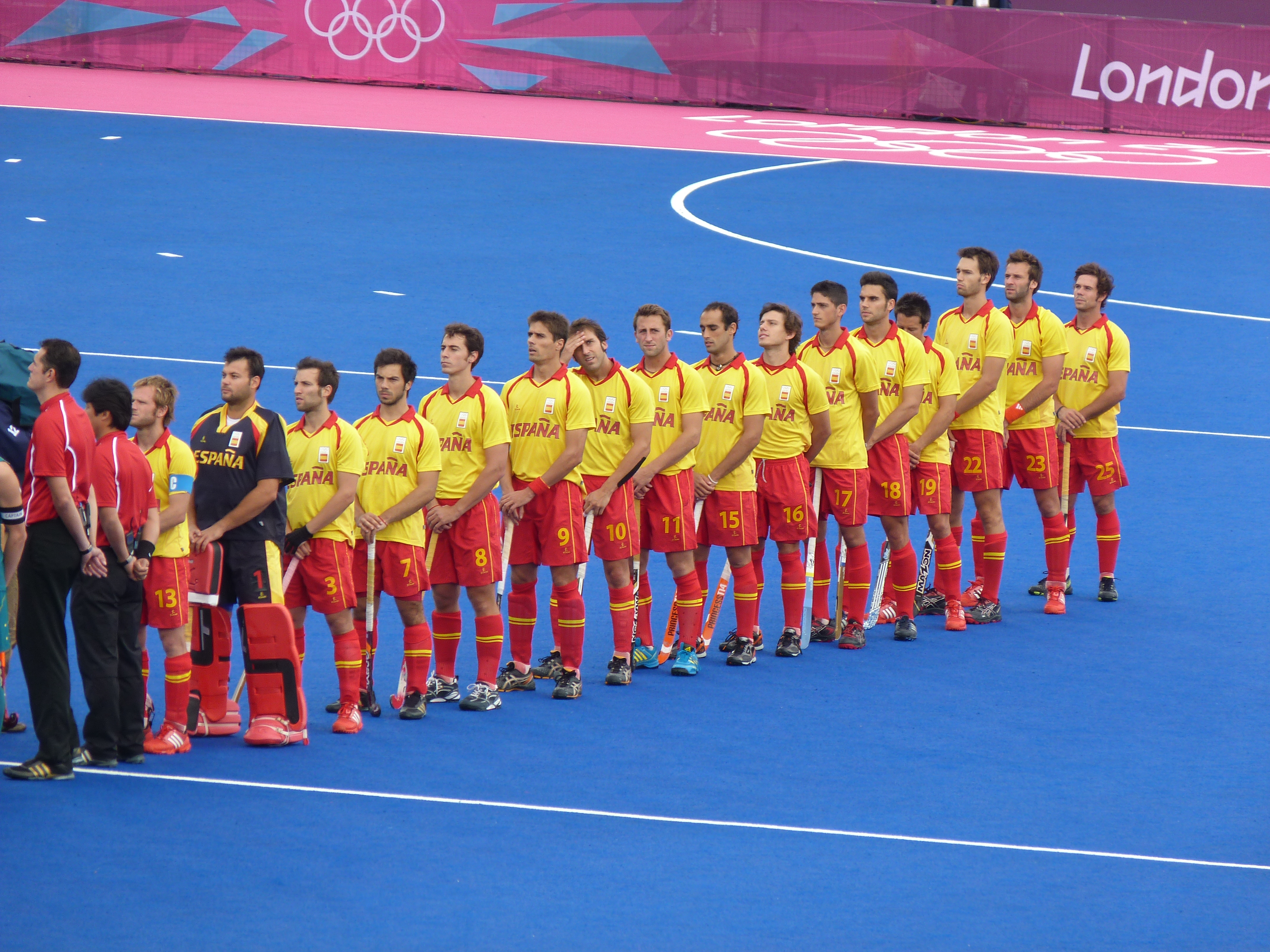
Spain national field hockey team before their game with Australia in the 2012 Olympics.

1. Francisco Cortés (GK)
2. Santi Freixa (C)
3. Sergi Enrique
7. Miguel Delas
8. Alex Fàbregas
9. Pol Amat
10. Eduard Tubau
11. Roc Oliva
13. Ramón Alegre
15. Jose Ballbe
16. Juan Fernández
17. Xavi Lleonart
18. Andrés Mir
19. Marc Salles (R)
20. Xavier Trenchs (GK) (R)
22. Manel Terraza
23. David Alegre
25. Pau Quemada

=== Pakistan ===
The following is the Pakistan roster in the men's field hockey tournament of the 2012 Summer Olympics.

Head Coach: Akhtar Rasool

1. I. Shah (GK)
2. Muhammad Irfan
3. Muhammad Rizwan Sr.
4. Muhammad Rizwan Jr.
5. Fareed Ahmed
6. Rashid Mehmood
7. Muhammad Waqas
8. Muhammad Umar Bhutta
9. Abdul Haseem Khan
10. Shakeel Abbasi
11. Sohail Abbas (C)
14. Muhammad Tousiq
15. Shafqat Rasool
16. Rehan Butt
17. Waseem Ahmed
18. Muhammad Imran

Reserves:

- Imran Butt (GK)
- Syed Kashif Shah

=== Argentina ===
The following is the Argentina roster in the men's field hockey tournament of the 2012 Summer Olympics.

Head Coach: Pablo Lombi

1. Juan Manuel Vivaldi (GK)
3. Ignacio Bergner
4. Matías Vila (C)
5. Pedro Ibarra
7. Facundo Callioni
8. Lucas Rey
9. Rodrigo Vila
10. Matias Enrique Paredes
11. Lucas Cammareri
12. Lucas Vila
17. Juan Martín Lopez
18. Santiago Montelli
24. Manuel Brunet
26. Agustin Mazzilli
27. Lucas Rossi
28. Gonzalo Peillat

Reserves:

15. Juan Espinosa (GK)
23. Matías González

=== South Africa ===
The following is the South African roster in the men's field hockey tournament of the 2012 Summer Olympics.

Head Coach: Gregg Clark

1. Jonathan Robinson
2. Wade Paton
3. Andrew Cronje
4. Lloyd Madsen
5. Austin Smith (C)
7. Timothy Drummond
8. Marvin Harper
9. Julian Hykes
10. Lloyd Norris-Jones
11. Lance Louw
14. Rhett Halkett
18. Thornton McDade
23. Erasmus Pieterse (GK)
25. Justin Reid-Ross
29. Ian Haley
30. Taine Paton
31. Clinton Panther

Reserves:

- Jacques Le Roux (GK)

== Pool B ==
=== Germany ===
The following is the Germany roster in the men's field hockey tournament of the 2012 Summer Olympics.

Head Coach: Markus Weise

4. Maximilian Müller (C)
6. Martin Häner
7. Oskar Deecke
8. Christopher Wesley
9. Moritz Fürste
13. Tobias Hauke
14. Jan-Philipp Rabente
15. Benjamin Weß
17. Timo Weß
18. Oliver Korn
19. Christopher Zeller
21. Max Weinhold (GK)
22. Matthias Witthaus
23. Florian Fuchs
25. Philipp Zeller
26. Thilo Stralkowski

Reserves:

- Linus Butt
- Nicolas Jacobi (GK)

=== Netherlands ===
The following is the Netherlands roster in the men's field hockey tournament of the 2012 Summer Olympics.

Head Coach: Paul van Ass

1. Jaap Stockmann (GK)
3. Tim Jenniskens
4. Klaas Vermeulen
5. Marcel Balkestein
7. Wouter Jolie
8. Billy Bakker
9. Roderick Weusthof
12. Robbert Kemperman
13. Sander Baart
14. Teun de Nooijer
16. Floris Evers (C)
19. Bob de Voogd
20. Sander de Wijn
22. Rogier Hofman
24. Robert van der Horst
26. Valentin Verga
30. Mink van der Weerden

Reserves:

- Pirmin Blaak (GK)

=== South Korea ===
The following is the South Korea roster in the men's field hockey tournament of the 2012 Summer Olympics.

Head Coach: Cho Myung-jun

1. Lee Myung-ho
3. Jang Jong-hyun
5. Oh Dae-keun
6. Lee Nam-yong
7. Seo Jong-ho
8. Lee Seung-il
9. Yoon Sung-hoon
10. You Hyo-sik
11. Yeo Woon-kon
13. Kang Moon-kweon
14. Hyun Hye-sung
15. Cha Jong-bok
17. Hong Eun-seong
19. Kim Young-jin
23. Kang Moon-kyu
32. Nam Hyun-woo

Reserves:

- Cho Suk-hoon
- Kim Jae-hyeon

=== New Zealand ===
The following is the New Zealand roster in the men's field hockey tournament of the 2012 Summer Olympics.

Head Coach: Shane McLeod

4. Nicholas Haig
5. Andy Hayward
6. Simon Child
7. Blair Hopping
8. Dean Couzins (C)
9. Blair Hilton
10. Ryan Archibald
12. Bradley Shaw
17. Kyle Pontifex (GK)
18. Phil Burrows
25. Shea McAleese
27. Stephen Jenness
28. Richard Petherick
29. Hugo Inglis
31. Steve Edwards
32. Nick Wilson

Reserves:

- Hamish McGregor (GK)
- Arun Panchia

=== India ===
The following was the Indian roster in the men's field hockey tournament of the 2012 Summer Olympics.

Head Coach: Michael Nobbs

1. Ignace Tirkey
4. Sandeep Singh
6. Bharat Chettri (C, GK)
7. Manpreet Singh
8. Sardara Singh (VC)
10. Dharamvir Singh
12. V. R. Raghunath
13. Gurbaj Singh
14. Tushar Khandker
15. S. K. Uthappa
16. P. R. Shreejesh (GK)
17. Danish Mujtaba
18. Shivendra Singh
21. Gurwinder Singh Chandi
24. Sowmarpet Sunil
26. Birendra Lakra

Reserves:

- Sarvanjit Singh
- Kothajit Singh

=== Belgium ===
The following is the Belgium roster in the men's field hockey tournament of the 2012 Summer Olympics.

Head Coach: Colin Batch

2. Xavier Reckinger
5. Jerome Dekeyser
7. John-John Dohmen
8. Florent van Aubel
9. Maxime Luycx
10. Cedric Charlier
11. Benjamin Van Hove
12. Gauthier Boccard
13. Jeffrey Thys
17. Thomas Briels
19. Felix Denayer
21. Vincent Vanasch (GK)
22. Simon Gougnard
23. Alexandre De Saedeleer
27. Tom Boon
28. Jerome Truyens (C)

Reserves:

- Emmanuel Leroy (GK)
- Elliot Van Strydonck
