= Fuego XII =

Horse ridden by the Spanish equestrian Juan Manuel Muñoz Diaz in the sport of dressage

- Breed: Pura Raza Espanola
- Discipline: Dressage
- Sire: Utrerano
- Grandsire: Lebrijano III
- Dam: Mundana II
- Maternal grandsire: Elegido III
- Sex: Stallion
- Foaled: 1998
- Country: Spain
- Colour: Gray
- Owner: Miguel Angel Cardenas

Fuego XII (born 1998) is a horse ridden by the Spanish equestrian Juan Manuel Muñoz Diaz in the sport of dressage. He was the 2008 Spanish Grand Prix dressage champion, and placed 22nd at the 2008 Olympics qualifier. Fuego XII won World acclaim and became 'King of Hearts' at the 2010 World Equestrian Games, Kentucky, USA after a spectacular test.
