= Francisco Cortés Juncosa =

Spanish field hockey player (born 1983)

Quico Cortés
Personal information
- Full name: Francisco Cortés Juncosa
- Born: 29 March 1983 (age 43) Terrassa, Spain
- Height: 1.81 m (5 ft 11 in)
- Weight: 80 kg (176 lb)

Sport
- Sport: Field hockey
- Position: Goalkeeper
- Club: Club Egara
Senior career
Years	Team	Caps	Goals
–2012	Club Egara	-	-
2012–2013	Den Bosch	-	-
2013–present	Club Egara	-	-
National team
Years	Team	Caps	Goals
2004–present	Spain	310	(0)
Medal record
Men's field hockey
Representing Spain
Olympic Games
Silver medal – second place	2008 Beijing	Team
World Cup
Bronze medal – third place	2006 Mönchengladbach
Champions Trophy
Gold medal – first place	2004 Lahore
Silver medal – second place	2008 Rotterdam
Silver medal – second place	2011 Auckland
Bronze medal – third place	2005 Chennai
Bronze medal – third place	2006 Terrassa
EuroHockey Championship
Silver medal – second place	2007 Manchester
Silver medal – second place	2019 Antwerp
- Updated on 24 July 2021

Francisco "Quico" Cortés Juncosa (born 29 March 1983) is a Spanish field hockey player who plays as a goalkeeper for Club Egara and the Spanish national team.

== Club career ==
Cortés played for Club Egara throughout his career except for the 2012–2013 season, when he played for Dutch club HC Den Bosch.

== International career ==
Cortés was a member of the Spain Men's National Team that won the silver medal at the 2008 Summer Olympics in Beijing, China. He also competed in the 2012 Summer Olympics. He was a part of the Spain squad which won the silver medal at the 2019 EuroHockey Championship. In December 2019, he was nominated for the FIH Goalkeeper of the Year Award. On 25 May 2021, he was selected for the Spain squad for the 2021 EuroHockey Championship.
