= Andrea Barnó =

Spanish handball player (born 1980)

Personal information
- Full name: Andrea Barnó San Martín
- Nationality: Spanish
- Born: 4 January 1980 (age 46) Estella-Lizarra, Spain

Sport
- Sport: Handball
- Position: Centre Back

Senior clubs
- Years: Team
- 1999–2012: SD Itxako
National team
Years	Team	Apps	(Gls)
2008–2012	Spain	97	(97)
Medal record
Olympic Games
Bronze medal – third place	2012 London	Team
World Championship
Bronze medal – third place	2011 Brazil	Team
European Championship
Silver medal – second place	2008 Macedonia	Team

Andrea Barnó San Martín (born 4 January 1980 in Estella-Lizarra) is a former Spanish handball player, member of the Spanish women's national team.

She was part of the Spanish team at the 2008 European Women's Handball Championship, where the Spanish team reached the final, after defeating Germany in the semifinal. She competed at the 2011 World Women's Handball Championship in Brazil, where the Spanish team placed third. She was also part of the Spanish team that won the bronze medal at the 2012 Summer Olympics.
