= Rhett Halkett =

South African field hockey player

Personal information
- Born: 2 May 1986 (age 40) Johannesburg, South Africa

Sport
- Sport: Field hockey
- Position: Defender
- Club: Netherlands Women (Assistant)
Senior career
Years	Team	Caps	Goals
2010–2013	Den Bosch	-	-
2013–2014	Laren	-	-
2014–2018	Mannheimer HC	-	-
2018–2019	UHC Hamburg	-	-
National team
Years	Team	Caps	Goals
2009–2019	South Africa	155	-
Coaching career
- 2019–2020: UHC Hamburg Women (assistant)
- 2020–2021: Netherlands Women (assistant)
- 2023–: India (assistant)
Medal record
Men's field hockey
Representing South Africa
Africa Cup of Nations
Gold medal – first place	2005 Johannesburg
Gold medal – first place	2009 Accra
Gold medal – first place	2013 Nairobi
- Updated on 14 August 2020

Rhett Halkett (born 2 May 1986) is a South African former field hockey player who is the assistant coach of the India national field hockey team.

== Club career ==
Halkett left South Africa in 2010 to play for Den Bosch in the Dutch Hoofdklasse. After his contract expired in 2013 he left Den Bosch for Laren. After one season at Laren, he played 5 seasons in the German Bundesliga for Mannheimer HC and UHC Hamburg.

== International career ==
Halkett began playing for the South African national team in 2009. He competed at the 2010 Hockey World Cup in India, the 2010 Commonwealth Games in India, the 2012 Summer Olympics in England, the 2014 Hockey World Cup in The Netherlands, the Commonwealth Games. in Scotland. He is an African Cup of Nations gold medalist for 2009, 2013 and 2015. He won South African Men's Player of the Year in 2016. After the 2018 World Cup he retired from the national team.

== Coaching career ==
After he retired playing in 2019 at UHC Hamburg he became the assistant coach for the first women's team of the Hamburg club. In August 2020 he was appointed as the assistant coach of the Netherlands women's national team.
