= Xavier Trenchs =

Spanish field hockey player (born 1981)

Xavier Trenchs (born 11 July 1981) is a Spanish field hockey player. At the 2012 Summer Olympics he competed with the Spain national field hockey team in the men's tournament.
