= Dani Martín (field hockey) =

Spanish field hockey coach

Dani Martín is a Spanish field hockey coach. At the 2012 Summer Olympics he coached the Spain men's national field hockey team.
