= Chess at the 2006 Asian Games – Men's individual rapid =

Men's individual rapid at the 2006 Asian Games
- Venue: Al-Dana Indoor Hall
- Date: 2–4 December 2006
- Competitors: 42 from 21 nations

Medalists
gold medal	Murtas Kazhgaleyev	Kazakhstan
silver medal	Đào Thiên Hải	Vietnam
bronze medal	Bu Xiangzhi	China

The men's individual rapid competition at the 2006 Asian Games in Doha was held from 2 December to 4 December at the Al-Dana Indoor Hall.

== Schedule ==
All times are Arabia Standard Time (UTC+03:00)

Date	Time	Event
Saturday, 2 December 2006	11:00	Round 1
Saturday, 2 December 2006	15:00	Round 2
Saturday, 2 December 2006	17:00	Round 3
Sunday, 3 December 2006	11:00	Round 4
Sunday, 3 December 2006	15:00	Round 5
Sunday, 3 December 2006	17:00	Round 6
Monday, 4 December 2006	11:00	Round 7
Monday, 4 December 2006	15:00	Round 8
Monday, 4 December 2006	17:00	Round 9

== Results ==
Legend

- DNS — Did not start
- WO — Walkover

=== Round 1 ===
White	Score	Black
Imad Hakki (SYR)	½–½	Krishnan Sasikiran (IND)
Pentala Harikrishna (IND)	1–0	Tsegmediin Batchuluun (MGL)
Taleb Moussa (UAE)	0–1	Rustam Kasimdzhanov (UZB)
Bu Xiangzhi (CHN)	1–0	Mesgen Amanow (TKM)
Jawan Bakr (SYR)	0–1	Wang Yue (CHN)
Murtas Kazhgaleyev (KAZ)	1–0	Ahmad Samhouri (JOR)
Abdullah Hassan (UAE)	½–½	Darmen Sadvakasov (KAZ)
Utut Adianto (INA)	1–0	Bahjat Al-Rimawi (JOR)
Bayarsaikhany Gündavaa (MGL)	½–½	Ehsan Ghaemmaghami (IRI)
Đào Thiên Hải (VIE)	1–0	Athula Russell (SRI)
Shinya Kojima (JPN)	0–1	Mohammed Al-Modiahki (QAT)
Nguyễn Anh Dũng (VIE)	1–0	Ryosuke Nanjo (JPN)
Maher Ayyad (BRN)	0–1	Elshan Moradi (IRI)
Alexei Barsov (UZB)	1–0	Bilam Lal Shrestha (NEP)
Atta Taamra (PLE)	0–1	Enamul Hossain (BAN)
Susanto Megaranto (INA)	1–0	Surbir Lama (NEP)
Husain Ayyad (BRN)	0–1	Reefat Bin Sattar (BAN)
Mohammed Al-Sayed (QAT)	1–0	Rodolfo Abelgas (MAC)
G. C. Anuruddha (SRI)	0–1	Meýlis Annaberdiýew (TKM)
Darwin Laylo (PHI)	1–0	Mak Tong Kuan (MAC)
Talal Shoubaita (PLE)	0–1 WO	Ronald Dableo (PHI)

=== Round 2 ===
White	Score	Black
Elshan Moradi (IRI)	½–½	Pentala Harikrishna (IND)
Rustam Kasimdzhanov (UZB)	1–0	Alexei Barsov (UZB)
Enamul Hossain (BAN)	1–0	Bu Xiangzhi (CHN)
Wang Yue (CHN)	1–0	Susanto Megaranto (INA)
Reefat Bin Sattar (BAN)	0–1	Murtas Kazhgaleyev (KAZ)
Mohammed Al-Sayed (QAT)	½–½	Utut Adianto (INA)
Meýlis Annaberdiýew (TKM)	0–1	Đào Thiên Hải (VIE)
Mohammed Al-Modiahki (QAT)	½–½	Darwin Laylo (PHI)
Ronald Dableo (PHI)	½–½	Nguyễn Anh Dũng (VIE)
Krishnan Sasikiran (IND)	½–½	Abdullah Hassan (UAE)
Darmen Sadvakasov (KAZ)	1–0	Bayarsaikhany Gündavaa (MGL)
Ehsan Ghaemmaghami (IRI)	1–0	Imad Hakki (SYR)
Tsegmediin Batchuluun (MGL)	1–0	Ryosuke Nanjo (JPN)
Bilam Lal Shrestha (NEP)	1–0	Taleb Moussa (UAE)
Mesgen Amanow (TKM)	1–0	Maher Ayyad (BRN)
Surbir Lama (NEP)	1–0	Jawan Bakr (SYR)
Ahmad Samhouri (JOR)	1–0	Atta Taamra (PLE)
Bahjat Al-Rimawi (JOR)	0–1	Husain Ayyad (BRN)
Athula Russell (SRI)	0–1	G. C. Anuruddha (SRI)
Rodolfo Abelgas (MAC)	0–1	Shinya Kojima (JPN)
Mak Tong Kuan (MAC)	1–0	Bye

=== Round 3 ===
White	Score	Black
Murtas Kazhgaleyev (KAZ)	½–½	Rustam Kasimdzhanov (UZB)
Đào Thiên Hải (VIE)	½–½	Wang Yue (CHN)
Pentala Harikrishna (IND)	½–½	Enamul Hossain (BAN)
Nguyễn Anh Dũng (VIE)	1–0	Darmen Sadvakasov (KAZ)
Utut Adianto (INA)	0–1	Elshan Moradi (IRI)
Darwin Laylo (PHI)	½–½	Ehsan Ghaemmaghami (IRI)
Mohammed Al-Modiahki (QAT)	½–½	Mohammed Al-Sayed (QAT)
Bu Xiangzhi (CHN)	1–0	Ronald Dableo (PHI)
Shinya Kojima (JPN)	½–½	Krishnan Sasikiran (IND)
Alexei Barsov (UZB)	1–0	Ahmad Samhouri (JOR)
Susanto Megaranto (INA)	1–0	Bilam Lal Shrestha (NEP)
Abdullah Hassan (UAE)	0–1	Reefat Bin Sattar (BAN)
Husain Ayyad (BRN)	0–1	Meýlis Annaberdiýew (TKM)
G. C. Anuruddha (SRI)	1–0	Tsegmediin Batchuluun (MGL)
Mak Tong Kuan (MAC)	0–1	Mesgen Amanow (TKM)
Imad Hakki (SYR)	1–0	Surbir Lama (NEP)
Bayarsaikhany Gündavaa (MGL)	0–1	Taleb Moussa (UAE)
Jawan Bakr (SYR)	1–0	Rodolfo Abelgas (MAC)
Ryosuke Nanjo (JPN)	0–1	Bahjat Al-Rimawi (JOR)
Maher Ayyad (BRN)	0–1	Athula Russell (SRI)
Atta Taamra (PLE)	1–0	Bye

=== Round 4 ===
White	Score	Black
Rustam Kasimdzhanov (UZB)	0–1	Đào Thiên Hải (VIE)
Wang Yue (CHN)	1–0	Nguyễn Anh Dũng (VIE)
Enamul Hossain (BAN)	0–1	Murtas Kazhgaleyev (KAZ)
Elshan Moradi (IRI)	0–1	Mohammed Al-Modiahki (QAT)
Reefat Bin Sattar (BAN)	½–½	Pentala Harikrishna (IND)
Mohammed Al-Sayed (QAT)	0–1	Bu Xiangzhi (CHN)
Ehsan Ghaemmaghami (IRI)	1–0	G. C. Anuruddha (SRI)
Meýlis Annaberdiýew (TKM)	0–1	Alexei Barsov (UZB)
Mesgen Amanow (TKM)	½–½	Susanto Megaranto (INA)
Krishnan Sasikiran (IND)	½–½	Darwin Laylo (PHI)
Darmen Sadvakasov (KAZ)	1–0	Imad Hakki (SYR)
Ronald Dableo (PHI)	1–0	Utut Adianto (INA)
Tsegmediin Batchuluun (MGL)	1–0	Shinya Kojima (JPN)
Taleb Moussa (UAE)	0–1	Athula Russell (SRI)
Atta Taamra (PLE)	0–1	Jawan Bakr (SYR)
Ahmad Samhouri (JOR)	1–0	Husain Ayyad (BRN)
Surbir Lama (NEP)	½–½	Abdullah Hassan (UAE)
Bahjat Al-Rimawi (JOR)	0–1	Mak Tong Kuan (MAC)
Bilam Lal Shrestha (NEP)	1–0	Bayarsaikhany Gündavaa (MGL)
Ryosuke Nanjo (JPN)	½–½	Maher Ayyad (BRN)
Rodolfo Abelgas (MAC)	1–0	Bye

=== Round 5 ===
White	Score	Black
Murtas Kazhgaleyev (KAZ)	1–0	Wang Yue (CHN)
Đào Thiên Hải (VIE)	1–0	Ehsan Ghaemmaghami (IRI)
Bu Xiangzhi (CHN)	1–0	Mohammed Al-Modiahki (QAT)
Alexei Barsov (UZB)	1–0	Darmen Sadvakasov (KAZ)
Pentala Harikrishna (IND)	1–0	Ronald Dableo (PHI)
Susanto Megaranto (INA)	1–0	Rustam Kasimdzhanov (UZB)
Nguyễn Anh Dũng (VIE)	1–0	Reefat Bin Sattar (BAN)
Darwin Laylo (PHI)	½–½	Elshan Moradi (IRI)
Mesgen Amanow (TKM)	0–1	Enamul Hossain (BAN)
Ahmad Samhouri (JOR)	0–1	Krishnan Sasikiran (IND)
G. C. Anuruddha (SRI)	0–1	Mohammed Al-Sayed (QAT)
Athula Russell (SRI)	0–1	Meýlis Annaberdiýew (TKM)
Mak Tong Kuan (MAC)	0–1	Tsegmediin Batchuluun (MGL)
Jawan Bakr (SYR)	1–0	Bilam Lal Shrestha (NEP)
Utut Adianto (INA)	1–0	Surbir Lama (NEP)
Imad Hakki (SYR)	0–1	Shinya Kojima (JPN)
Abdullah Hassan (UAE)	½–½	Bahjat Al-Rimawi (JOR)
Husain Ayyad (BRN)	0–1	Taleb Moussa (UAE)
Rodolfo Abelgas (MAC)	0–1	Atta Taamra (PLE)
Bayarsaikhany Gündavaa (MGL)	1–0	Ryosuke Nanjo (JPN)
Maher Ayyad (BRN)	1–0	Bye

=== Round 6 ===
White	Score	Black
Đào Thiên Hải (VIE)	½–½	Murtas Kazhgaleyev (KAZ)
Alexei Barsov (UZB)	0–1	Bu Xiangzhi (CHN)
Wang Yue (CHN)	1–0	Pentala Harikrishna (IND)
Enamul Hossain (BAN)	½–½	Nguyễn Anh Dũng (VIE)
Elshan Moradi (IRI)	1–0	Susanto Megaranto (INA)
Krishnan Sasikiran (IND)	½–½	Mohammed Al-Sayed (QAT)
Ehsan Ghaemmaghami (IRI)	1–0	Tsegmediin Batchuluun (MGL)
Mohammed Al-Modiahki (QAT)	1–0	Jawan Bakr (SYR)
Meýlis Annaberdiýew (TKM)	½–½	Darwin Laylo (PHI)
Rustam Kasimdzhanov (UZB)	1–0	Reefat Bin Sattar (BAN)
Darmen Sadvakasov (KAZ)	½–½	Mesgen Amanow (TKM)
Shinya Kojima (JPN)	0–1	Utut Adianto (INA)
Ronald Dableo (PHI)	1–0	Ahmad Samhouri (JOR)
Taleb Moussa (UAE)	1–0	G. C. Anuruddha (SRI)
Bilam Lal Shrestha (NEP)	½–½	Abdullah Hassan (UAE)
Athula Russell (SRI)	1–0	Mak Tong Kuan (MAC)
Atta Taamra (PLE)	0–1	Imad Hakki (SYR)
Bahjat Al-Rimawi (JOR)	1–0	Maher Ayyad (BRN)
Surbir Lama (NEP)	0–1	Bayarsaikhany Gündavaa (MGL)
Rodolfo Abelgas (MAC)	0–1	Husain Ayyad (BRN)
Ryosuke Nanjo (JPN)	1–0	Bye

=== Round 7 ===
White	Score	Black
Bu Xiangzhi (CHN)	1–0	Đào Thiên Hải (VIE)
Murtas Kazhgaleyev (KAZ)	1–0	Mohammed Al-Modiahki (QAT)
Wang Yue (CHN)	1–0	Alexei Barsov (UZB)
Enamul Hossain (BAN)	½–½	Ehsan Ghaemmaghami (IRI)
Nguyễn Anh Dũng (VIE)	½–½	Elshan Moradi (IRI)
Utut Adianto (INA)	0–1	Krishnan Sasikiran (IND)
Pentala Harikrishna (IND)	1–0	Meýlis Annaberdiýew (TKM)
Mohammed Al-Sayed (QAT)	0–1	Rustam Kasimdzhanov (UZB)
Susanto Megaranto (INA)	½–½	Ronald Dableo (PHI)
Darwin Laylo (PHI)	1–0	Taleb Moussa (UAE)
Jawan Bakr (SYR)	0–1	Darmen Sadvakasov (KAZ)
Tsegmediin Batchuluun (MGL)	1–0	Athula Russell (SRI)
Reefat Bin Sattar (BAN)	1–0	Mesgen Amanow (TKM)
Imad Hakki (SYR)	1–0	Bilam Lal Shrestha (NEP)
Abdullah Hassan (UAE)	½–½	Shinya Kojima (JPN)
Bayarsaikhany Gündavaa (MGL)	1–0	Bahjat Al-Rimawi (JOR)
G. C. Anuruddha (SRI)	½–½	Ahmad Samhouri (JOR)
Husain Ayyad (BRN)	1–0	Atta Taamra (PLE)
Mak Tong Kuan (MAC)	0–1	Ryosuke Nanjo (JPN)
Maher Ayyad (BRN)	1–0	Rodolfo Abelgas (MAC)
Surbir Lama (NEP)	1–0	Bye

=== Round 8 ===
White	Score	Black
Murtas Kazhgaleyev (KAZ)	½–½	Bu Xiangzhi (CHN)
Krishnan Sasikiran (IND)	1–0	Wang Yue (CHN)
Đào Thiên Hải (VIE)	1–0	Pentala Harikrishna (IND)
Rustam Kasimdzhanov (UZB)	1–0	Darwin Laylo (PHI)
Ehsan Ghaemmaghami (IRI)	½–½	Nguyễn Anh Dũng (VIE)
Elshan Moradi (IRI)	1–0	Enamul Hossain (BAN)
Darmen Sadvakasov (KAZ)	1–0	Susanto Megaranto (INA)
Mohammed Al-Modiahki (QAT)	1–0	Ronald Dableo (PHI)
Tsegmediin Batchuluun (MGL)	½–½	Alexei Barsov (UZB)
Meýlis Annaberdiýew (TKM)	1–0	Utut Adianto (INA)
Reefat Bin Sattar (BAN)	1–0	Imad Hakki (SYR)
Mohammed Al-Sayed (QAT)	1–0	Bayarsaikhany Gündavaa (MGL)
Taleb Moussa (UAE)	½–½	Abdullah Hassan (UAE)
Mesgen Amanow (TKM)	½–½	Husain Ayyad (BRN)
Athula Russell (SRI)	1–0	Jawan Bakr (SYR)
Shinya Kojima (JPN)	0–1	G. C. Anuruddha (SRI)
Ahmad Samhouri (JOR)	0–1	Maher Ayyad (BRN)
Bahjat Al-Rimawi (JOR)	1–0	Surbir Lama (NEP)
Ryosuke Nanjo (JPN)	1–0	Atta Taamra (PLE)
Rodolfo Abelgas (MAC)	½–½	Mak Tong Kuan (MAC)
Bilam Lal Shrestha (NEP)	1–0	Bye

=== Round 9 ===
White	Score	Black
Bu Xiangzhi (CHN)	½–½	Rustam Kasimdzhanov (UZB)
Krishnan Sasikiran (IND)	0–1	Murtas Kazhgaleyev (KAZ)
Elshan Moradi (IRI)	0–1	Đào Thiên Hải (VIE)
Wang Yue (CHN)	0–1	Darmen Sadvakasov (KAZ)
Nguyễn Anh Dũng (VIE)	½–½	Mohammed Al-Modiahki (QAT)
Pentala Harikrishna (IND)	1–0	Ehsan Ghaemmaghami (IRI)
Alexei Barsov (UZB)	1–0	Mohammed Al-Sayed (QAT)
Enamul Hossain (BAN)	0–1	Meýlis Annaberdiýew (TKM)
Darwin Laylo (PHI)	1–0	Reefat Bin Sattar (BAN)
Susanto Megaranto (INA)	1–0	Tsegmediin Batchuluun (MGL)
Ronald Dableo (PHI)	1–0	Athula Russell (SRI)
Utut Adianto (INA)	½–½	Bayarsaikhany Gündavaa (MGL)
Imad Hakki (SYR)	1–0	G. C. Anuruddha (SRI)
Maher Ayyad (BRN)	0–1	Taleb Moussa (UAE)
Ryosuke Nanjo (JPN)	1–0	Mesgen Amanow (TKM)
Abdullah Hassan (UAE)	0–1	Husain Ayyad (BRN)
Bilam Lal Shrestha (NEP)	1–0	Bahjat Al-Rimawi (JOR)
Jawan Bakr (SYR)	1–0	Shinya Kojima (JPN)
Atta Taamra (PLE)	1–0	Mak Tong Kuan (MAC)
Surbir Lama (NEP)	1–0	Rodolfo Abelgas (MAC)
Ahmad Samhouri (JOR)	1–0	Bye

=== Summary ===
Rank	Athlete	Rtg	Round									Total	SRO
Rank	Athlete	Rtg	1	2	3	4	5	6	7	8	9	Total	SRO
1st place, gold medalist(s)	Murtas Kazhgaleyev (KAZ)	2609	1	1	½	1	1	½	1	½	1	7½	20761
2nd place, silver medalist(s)	Đào Thiên Hải (VIE)	2557	1	1	½	1	1	½	0	1	1	7	20847
3rd place, bronze medalist(s)	Bu Xiangzhi (CHN)	2671	1	0	1	1	1	1	1	½	½	7	20339
4	Rustam Kasimdzhanov (UZB)	2672	1	1	½	0	0	1	1	1	½	6	20289
5	Darmen Sadvakasov (KAZ)	2596	½	1	0	1	0	½	1	1	1	6	19621
6	Wang Yue (CHN)	2664	1	1	½	1	0	1	1	0	0	5½	20681
7	Elshan Moradi (IRI)	2539	1	½	1	0	½	1	½	1	0	5½	20354
8	Darwin Laylo (PHI)	2448	1	½	½	½	½	½	1	0	1	5½	20328
9	Nguyễn Anh Dũng (VIE)	2541	1	½	1	0	1	½	½	½	½	5½	20327
10	Alexei Barsov (UZB)	2537	1	0	1	1	1	0	0	½	1	5½	20252
11	Pentala Harikrishna (IND)	2674	1	½	½	½	1	0	1	0	1	5½	20195
12	Mohammed Al-Modiahki (QAT)	2550	1	½	½	1	0	1	0	1	½	5½	20054
13	Krishnan Sasikiran (IND)	2675	½	½	½	½	1	½	1	1	0	5½	19831
14	Meýlis Annaberdiýew (TKM)	2457	1	0	1	0	1	½	0	1	1	5½	19746
15	Ronald Dableo (PHI)	2425	1	½	0	1	0	1	½	0	1	5	20073
16	Ehsan Ghaemmaghami (IRI)	2581	½	1	½	1	0	1	½	½	0	5	19786
17	Susanto Megaranto (INA)	2492	1	0	1	½	1	0	½	0	1	5	19723
18	Enamul Hossain (BAN)	2503	1	1	½	0	1	½	½	0	0	4½	20411
19	Mohammed Al-Sayed (QAT)	2486	1	½	½	0	1	½	0	1	0	4½	20135
20	Reefat Bin Sattar (BAN)	2489	1	0	1	½	0	0	1	1	0	4½	20016
21	Tsegmediin Batchuluun (MGL)	2404	0	1	0	1	1	0	1	½	0	4½	19095
22	Imad Hakki (SYR)	2422	½	0	1	0	0	1	1	0	1	4½	18938
23	Husain Ayyad (BRN)	2003	0	1	0	0	0	1	1	½	1	4½	18693
24	Taleb Moussa (UAE)	2365	0	0	1	0	1	1	0	½	1	4½	18347
25	Bilam Lal Shrestha (NEP)	2104	0	1	0	1	0	½	0	1	1	4½	16770
26	Ryosuke Nanjo (JPN)	2186	0	0	0	½	0	1	1	1	1	4½	16068
27	Utut Adianto (INA)	2589	1	½	0	0	1	1	0	0	½	4	19314
28	Bayarsaikhany Gündavaa (MGL)	2237	½	0	0	0	1	1	1	0	½	4	19215
29	Athula Russell (SRI)	2234	0	0	1	1	0	1	0	1	0	4	18884
30	Jawan Bakr (SYR)	2335	0	0	1	1	1	0	0	0	1	4	18512
31	G. C. Anuruddha (SRI)	2204	0	1	1	0	0	0	½	1	0	3½	19271
32	Mesgen Amanow (TKM)	2339	0	1	1	½	0	½	0	½	0	3½	19077
33	Abdullah Hassan (UAE)	2311	½	½	0	½	½	½	½	½	0	3½	18819
34	Bahjat Al-Rimawi (JOR)	2308	0	0	1	0	½	1	0	1	0	3½	17662
35	Surbir Lama (NEP)	2095	0	1	0	½	0	0	1	0	1	3½	16694
36	Ahmad Samhouri (JOR)	2322	0	1	0	1	0	0	½	0	1	3½	16689
37	Maher Ayyad (BRN)	2137	0	0	0	½	1	0	1	1	0	3½	16293
38	Shinya Kojima (JPN)	2187	0	1	½	0	1	0	½	0	0	3	19490
39	Atta Taamra (PLE)	2102	0	0	1	0	1	0	0	0	1	3	13771
40	Mak Tong Kuan (MAC)	0	0	1	0	1	0	0	0	½	0	2½	16021
41	Rodolfo Abelgas (MAC)	0	0	0	0	1	0	0	0	½	0	1½	15345
—	Talal Shoubaita (PLE)	0	0									DNS	
