= Chess at the 2006 Asian Games – Mixed team standard =

Mixed team standard at the 2006 Asian Games
- Venue: Al-Dana Indoor Hall
- Date: 6–14 December 2006
- Competitors: 63 from 21 nations

Medalists
gold medal	India; Krishnan Sasikiran, Pentala Harikrishna, Koneru Humpy
silver medal	China; Bu Xiangzhi, Wang Yue, Zhao Xue
bronze medal	Iran; Ehsan Ghaemmaghami, Elshan Moradi, Atousa Pourkashian

The mixed team standard competition at the 2006 Asian Games in Doha was held from 6 December to 14 December at the Al-Dana Indoor Hall.

== Schedule ==
All times are Arabia Standard Time (UTC+03:00)

Date	Time	Event
Wednesday, 6 December 2006	15:00	Round 1
Thursday, 7 December 2006	15:00	Round 2
Friday, 8 December 2006	15:00	Round 3
Saturday, 9 December 2006	15:00	Round 4
Sunday, 10 December 2006	15:00	Round 5
Monday, 11 December 2006	15:00	Round 6
Tuesday, 12 December 2006	15:00	Round 7
Wednesday, 13 December 2006	15:00	Round 8
Thursday, 14 December 2006	15:00	Round 9

== Results ==
=== Round 1 ===
	Score	
Mongolia	½–2½	India
Tsegmediin Batchuluun	0–1	Krishnan Sasikiran
Bayarsaikhany Gündavaa	½–½	Pentala Harikrishna
Batkhuyagiin Möngöntuul	0–1	Koneru Humpy
China	3–0	Syria
Bu Xiangzhi	1–0	Imad Hakki
Wang Yue	1–0	Jawan Bakr
Zhao Xue	1–0	Afamia Mir Mahmoud
Jordan	0–3	Qatar
Ahmad Samhouri	0–1	Mohammed Al-Modiahki
Bahjat Al-Rimawi	0–1	Mohammed Al-Sayed
Natalie Jamaliah	0–1	Zhu Chen
Kazakhstan	2½–½	United Arab Emirates
Darmen Sadvakasov	½–½	Taleb Moussa
Murtas Kazhgaleyev	1–0	Abdullah Hassan
Dana Aketayeva	1–0	Noura Mohamed Saleh
Sri Lanka	½–2½	Iran
Athula Russell	½–½	Ehsan Ghaemmaghami
G. C. Anuruddha	0–1	Elshan Moradi
Yasoda Methmali	0–1	Atousa Pourkashian
Uzbekistan	3–0	Japan
Rustam Kasimdzhanov	1–0	Ryosuke Nanjo
Alexei Barsov	1–0	Shinya Kojima
Olga Sabirova	1–0	Emiko Nakagawa
Philippines	½–2½	Vietnam
Darwin Laylo	½–½	Đào Thiên Hải
Ronald Dableo	0–1	Nguyễn Anh Dũng
Jedara Docena	0–1	Nguyễn Thị Thanh An
Indonesia	3–0	Nepal
Utut Adianto	1–0	Bilam Lal Shrestha
Susanto Megaranto	1–0	Surbir Lama
Irene Kharisma Sukandar	1–0	Monalisa Khamboo
Bahrain	½–2½	Bangladesh
Maher Ayyad	½–½	Enamul Hossain
Husain Ayyad	0–1	Reefat Bin Sattar
Aysha Mutaywea	0–1	Shamima Akter Liza
Turkmenistan	3–0	Palestine
Meýlis Annaberdiýew	1–0	Atta Taamra
Mesgen Amanow	1–0	Talal Shoubaita
Mähri Geldiýewa	1–0	Shadia Jaradat
Macau	1½–1½	Bye
Rodolfo Abelgas	½–½	
Mak Tong Kuan	½–½	
Chan I Sin	½–½	

=== Round 2 ===
	Score	
Uzbekistan	2–1	China
Rustam Kasimdzhanov	½–½	Bu Xiangzhi
Alexei Barsov	½–½	Wang Yue
Olga Sabirova	1–0	Zhao Xue
Qatar	2½–½	Indonesia
Mohammed Al-Modiahki	1–0	Utut Adianto
Mohammed Al-Sayed	½–½	Susanto Megaranto
Zhu Chen	1–0	Irene Kharisma Sukandar
India	3–0	Turkmenistan
Krishnan Sasikiran	1–0	Meýlis Annaberdiýew
Pentala Harikrishna	1–0	Mesgen Amanow
Koneru Humpy	1–0	Mähri Geldiýewa
Vietnam	2½–½	Kazakhstan
Đào Thiên Hải	1–0	Darmen Sadvakasov
Nguyễn Anh Dũng	1–0	Murtas Kazhgaleyev
Nguyễn Thị Thanh An	½–½	Dana Aketayeva
Iran	1½–1½	Bangladesh
Ehsan Ghaemmaghami	½–½	Enamul Hossain
Elshan Moradi	1–0	Reefat Bin Sattar
Atousa Pourkashian	0–1	Shamima Akter Liza
Macau	0–3	Mongolia
Rodolfo Abelgas	0–1	Tsegmediin Batchuluun
Mak Tong Kuan	0–1	Bayarsaikhany Gündavaa
Chan I Sin	0–1	Batkhuyagiin Möngöntuul
United Arab Emirates	1½–1½	Philippines
Taleb Moussa	1–0	Darwin Laylo
Abdullah Hassan	½–½	Ronald Dableo
Noura Mohamed Saleh	0–1	Jedara Docena
Bahrain	2–1	Sri Lanka
Maher Ayyad	1–0	Athula Russell
Husain Ayyad	1–0	G. C. Anuruddha
Aysha Mutaywea	0–1	Yasoda Methmali
Syria	3–0	Japan
Imad Hakki	1–0	Ryosuke Nanjo
Jawan Bakr	1–0	Shinya Kojima
Afamia Mir Mahmoud	1–0	Emiko Nakagawa
Nepal	0–3	Jordan
Bilam Lal Shrestha	0–1	Ahmad Samhouri
Surbir Lama	0–1	Bahjat Al-Rimawi
Monalisa Khamboo	0–1	Natalie Jamaliah
Palestine	1½–1½	Bye
Atta Taamra	½–½	
Talal Shoubaita	½–½	
Shadia Jaradat	½–½	

=== Round 3 ===
	Score	
Qatar	1–2	India
Mohammed Al-Modiahki	0–1	Krishnan Sasikiran
Mohammed Al-Sayed	0–1	Pentala Harikrishna
Zhu Chen	1–0	Koneru Humpy
Vietnam	2–1	Uzbekistan
Đào Thiên Hải	½–½	Rustam Kasimdzhanov
Nguyễn Anh Dũng	1–0	Alexei Barsov
Nguyễn Thị Thanh An	½–½	Olga Sabirova
China	2½–½	Iran
Bu Xiangzhi	1–0	Ehsan Ghaemmaghami
Wang Yue	½–½	Elshan Moradi
Zhao Xue	1–0	Atousa Pourkashian
Bangladesh	0–3	Indonesia
Enamul Hossain	0–1	Utut Adianto
Reefat Bin Sattar	0–1	Susanto Megaranto
Shamima Akter Liza	0–1	Irene Kharisma Sukandar
Mongolia	1–2	Kazakhstan
Tsegmediin Batchuluun	0–1	Darmen Sadvakasov
Bayarsaikhany Gündavaa	0–1	Murtas Kazhgaleyev
Batkhuyagiin Möngöntuul	1–0	Dana Aketayeva
Turkmenistan	1–2	Syria
Meýlis Annaberdiýew	1–0	Imad Hakki
Mesgen Amanow	0–1	Jawan Bakr
Mähri Geldiýewa	0–1	Afamia Mir Mahmoud
Jordan	1½–1½	Bahrain
Ahmad Samhouri	1–0	Maher Ayyad
Bahjat Al-Rimawi	0–1	Husain Ayyad
Natalie Jamaliah	½–½	Aysha Mutaywea
Sri Lanka	1–2	United Arab Emirates
Athula Russell	½–½	Taleb Moussa
G. C. Anuruddha	½–½	Abdullah Hassan
Yasoda Methmali	0–1	Noura Mohamed Saleh
Philippines	3–0	Macau
Darwin Laylo	1–0	Rodolfo Abelgas
Ronald Dableo	1–0	Mak Tong Kuan
Jedara Docena	1–0	Chan I Sin
Palestine	1–2	Nepal
Atta Taamra	½–½	Bilam Lal Shrestha
Talal Shoubaita	½–½	Surbir Lama
Shadia Jaradat	0–1	Monalisa Khamboo
Japan	1½–1½	Bye
Ryosuke Nanjo	½–½	
Shinya Kojima	½–½	
Emiko Nakagawa	½–½	

=== Round 4 ===
	Score	
India	2½–½	Vietnam
Krishnan Sasikiran	1–0	Đào Thiên Hải
Pentala Harikrishna	½–½	Nguyễn Anh Dũng
Koneru Humpy	1–0	Nguyễn Thị Thanh An
Indonesia	½–2½	China
Utut Adianto	½–½	Bu Xiangzhi
Susanto Megaranto	0–1	Wang Yue
Irene Kharisma Sukandar	0–1	Zhao Xue
Uzbekistan	1–2	Qatar
Rustam Kasimdzhanov	1–0	Mohammed Al-Modiahki
Alexei Barsov	0–1	Mohammed Al-Sayed
Olga Sabirova	0–1	Zhu Chen
Kazakhstan	2–1	Philippines
Darmen Sadvakasov	1–0	Darwin Laylo
Murtas Kazhgaleyev	0–1	Ronald Dableo
Dana Aketayeva	1–0	Jedara Docena
Syria	1½–1½	Jordan
Imad Hakki	½–½	Ahmad Samhouri
Jawan Bakr	0–1	Bahjat Al-Rimawi
Afamia Mir Mahmoud	1–0	Natalie Jamaliah
Iran	2½–½	Mongolia
Ehsan Ghaemmaghami	½–½	Tsegmediin Batchuluun
Elshan Moradi	1–0	Bayarsaikhany Gündavaa
Atousa Pourkashian	1–0	Batkhuyagiin Möngöntuul
Bangladesh	½–2½	Turkmenistan
Enamul Hossain	½–½	Meýlis Annaberdiýew
Reefat Bin Sattar	0–1	Mesgen Amanow
Shamima Akter Liza	0–1	Mähri Geldiýewa
United Arab Emirates	2½–½	Bahrain
Taleb Moussa	½–½	Maher Ayyad
Abdullah Hassan	1–0	Husain Ayyad
Noura Mohamed Saleh	1–0	Aysha Mutaywea
Palestine	1½–1½	Sri Lanka
Atta Taamra	½–½	Athula Russell
Talal Shoubaita	1–0	G. C. Anuruddha
Shadia Jaradat	0–1	Yasoda Methmali
Japan	3–0	Macau
Ryosuke Nanjo	1–0	Rodolfo Abelgas
Shinya Kojima	1–0	Mak Tong Kuan
Emiko Nakagawa	1–0	Chan I Sin
Nepal	1½–1½	Bye
Bilam Lal Shrestha	½–½	
Surbir Lama	½–½	
Monalisa Khamboo	½–½	

=== Round 5 ===
	Score	
China	0–3	India
Bu Xiangzhi	0–1	Krishnan Sasikiran
Wang Yue	0–1	Pentala Harikrishna
Zhao Xue	0–1	Koneru Humpy
Qatar	2–1	Vietnam
Mohammed Al-Modiahki	½–½	Đào Thiên Hải
Mohammed Al-Sayed	1–0	Nguyễn Anh Dũng
Zhu Chen	½–½	Nguyễn Thị Thanh An
Kazakhstan	½–2½	Uzbekistan
Darmen Sadvakasov	½–½	Rustam Kasimdzhanov
Murtas Kazhgaleyev	0–1	Alexei Barsov
Dana Aketayeva	0–1	Olga Sabirova
Indonesia	1½–1½	Iran
Utut Adianto	½–½	Ehsan Ghaemmaghami
Susanto Megaranto	1–0	Elshan Moradi
Irene Kharisma Sukandar	0–1	Atousa Pourkashian
Turkmenistan	2½–½	United Arab Emirates
Meýlis Annaberdiýew	½–½	Taleb Moussa
Mesgen Amanow	1–0	Abdullah Hassan
Mähri Geldiýewa	1–0	Noura Mohamed Saleh
Philippines	1½–1½	Syria
Darwin Laylo	½–½	Imad Hakki
Ronald Dableo	1–0	Jawan Bakr
Jedara Docena	0–1	Afamia Mir Mahmoud
Jordan	½–2½	Mongolia
Ahmad Samhouri	0–1	Tsegmediin Batchuluun
Bahjat Al-Rimawi	½–½	Bayarsaikhany Gündavaa
Natalie Jamaliah	0–1	Batkhuyagiin Möngöntuul
Japan	½–2½	Bangladesh
Ryosuke Nanjo	0–1	Enamul Hossain
Shinya Kojima	0–1	Reefat Bin Sattar
Emiko Nakagawa	½–½	Shamima Akter Liza
Bahrain	2–1	Palestine
Maher Ayyad	½–½	Atta Taamra
Husain Ayyad	1–0	Talal Shoubaita
Aysha Mutaywea	½–½	Shadia Jaradat
Macau	1–2	Nepal
Rodolfo Abelgas	½–½	Bilam Lal Shrestha
Mak Tong Kuan	½–½	Surbir Lama
Chan I Sin	0–1	Monalisa Khamboo
Sri Lanka	1½–1½	Bye
Athula Russell	½–½	
G. C. Anuruddha	½–½	
Yasoda Methmali	½–½	

=== Round 6 ===
	Score	
India	3–0	Uzbekistan
Krishnan Sasikiran	1–0	Rustam Kasimdzhanov
Pentala Harikrishna	1–0	Alexei Barsov
Koneru Humpy	1–0	Olga Sabirova
China	2–1	Qatar
Bu Xiangzhi	1–0	Mohammed Al-Modiahki
Wang Yue	1–0	Mohammed Al-Sayed
Zhao Xue	0–1	Zhu Chen
Iran	3–0	Turkmenistan
Ehsan Ghaemmaghami	1–0	Meýlis Annaberdiýew
Elshan Moradi	1–0	Mesgen Amanow
Atousa Pourkashian	1–0	Mähri Geldiýewa
Vietnam	1½–1½	Indonesia
Đào Thiên Hải	1–0	Utut Adianto
Nguyễn Anh Dũng	0–1	Susanto Megaranto
Nguyễn Thị Thanh An	½–½	Irene Kharisma Sukandar
Syria	0–3	Kazakhstan
Imad Hakki	0–1	Darmen Sadvakasov
Jawan Bakr	0–1	Murtas Kazhgaleyev
Afamia Mir Mahmoud	0–1	Dana Aketayeva
Mongolia	2–1	Philippines
Tsegmediin Batchuluun	½–½	Darwin Laylo
Bayarsaikhany Gündavaa	½–½	Ronald Dableo
Batkhuyagiin Möngöntuul	1–0	Jedara Docena
United Arab Emirates	1–2	Bangladesh
Taleb Moussa	0–1	Enamul Hossain
Abdullah Hassan	1–0	Reefat Bin Sattar
Noura Mohamed Saleh	0–1	Shamima Akter Liza
Sri Lanka	0–3	Jordan
Athula Russell	0–1	Ahmad Samhouri
G. C. Anuruddha	0–1	Bahjat Al-Rimawi
Yasoda Methmali	0–1	Natalie Jamaliah
Nepal	1–2	Japan
Bilam Lal Shrestha	1–0	Ryosuke Nanjo
Surbir Lama	0–1	Shinya Kojima
Monalisa Khamboo	0–1	Emiko Nakagawa
Palestine	3–0	Macau
Atta Taamra	1–0	Rodolfo Abelgas
Talal Shoubaita	1–0	Mak Tong Kuan
Shadia Jaradat	1–0	Chan I Sin
Bahrain	1½–1½	Bye
Maher Ayyad	½–½	
Husain Ayyad	½–½	
Aysha Mutaywea	½–½	

=== Round 7 ===
	Score	
Iran	½–2½	India
Ehsan Ghaemmaghami	½–½	Krishnan Sasikiran
Elshan Moradi	0–1	Pentala Harikrishna
Atousa Pourkashian	0–1	Koneru Humpy
Qatar	½–2½	Kazakhstan
Mohammed Al-Modiahki	0–1	Darmen Sadvakasov
Mohammed Al-Sayed	0–1	Murtas Kazhgaleyev
Zhu Chen	½–½	Dana Aketayeva
Vietnam	0–3	China
Đào Thiên Hải	0–1	Bu Xiangzhi
Nguyễn Anh Dũng	0–1	Wang Yue
Nguyễn Thị Thanh An	0–1	Zhao Xue
Jordan	0–3	Indonesia
Ahmad Samhouri	0–1	Utut Adianto
Bahjat Al-Rimawi	0–1	Susanto Megaranto
Natalie Jamaliah	0–1	Irene Kharisma Sukandar
Uzbekistan	2½–½	Mongolia
Rustam Kasimdzhanov	1–0	Tsegmediin Batchuluun
Alexei Barsov	½–½	Bayarsaikhany Gündavaa
Olga Sabirova	1–0	Batkhuyagiin Möngöntuul
Bangladesh	1½–1½	Philippines
Enamul Hossain	½–½	Darwin Laylo
Reefat Bin Sattar	0–1	Ronald Dableo
Shamima Akter Liza	1–0	Jedara Docena
Turkmenistan	3–0	Bahrain
Meýlis Annaberdiýew	1–0	Maher Ayyad
Mesgen Amanow	1–0	Husain Ayyad
Mähri Geldiýewa	1–0	Aysha Mutaywea
Japan	1½–1½	Palestine
Ryosuke Nanjo	1–0	Atta Taamra
Shinya Kojima	½–½	Talal Shoubaita
Emiko Nakagawa	0–1	Shadia Jaradat
Nepal	½–2½	Syria
Bilam Lal Shrestha	0–1	Imad Hakki
Surbir Lama	½–½	Jawan Bakr
Monalisa Khamboo	0–1	Afamia Mir Mahmoud
Macau	½–2½	Sri Lanka
Rodolfo Abelgas	½–½	Athula Russell
Mak Tong Kuan	0–1	G. C. Anuruddha
Chan I Sin	0–1	Yasoda Methmali
United Arab Emirates	1½–1½	Bye
Taleb Moussa	½–½	
Abdullah Hassan	½–½	
Noura Mohamed Saleh	½–½	

=== Round 8 ===
	Score	
Indonesia	½–2½	India
Utut Adianto	0–1	Krishnan Sasikiran
Susanto Megaranto	½–½	Pentala Harikrishna
Irene Kharisma Sukandar	0–1	Koneru Humpy
Kazakhstan	1½–1½	China
Darmen Sadvakasov	1–0	Bu Xiangzhi
Murtas Kazhgaleyev	½–½	Wang Yue
Dana Aketayeva	0–1	Zhao Xue
Turkmenistan	0–3	Qatar
Meýlis Annaberdiýew	0–1	Mohammed Al-Modiahki
Mesgen Amanow	0–1	Mohammed Al-Sayed
Mähri Geldiýewa	0–1	Zhu Chen
Uzbekistan	1½–1½	Iran
Rustam Kasimdzhanov	1–0	Ehsan Ghaemmaghami
Alexei Barsov	0–1	Elshan Moradi
Olga Sabirova	½–½	Atousa Pourkashian
Syria	0–3	Bangladesh
Imad Hakki	0–1	Enamul Hossain
Jawan Bakr	0–1	Reefat Bin Sattar
Afamia Mir Mahmoud	0–1	Shamima Akter Liza
Mongolia	2½–½	Vietnam
Tsegmediin Batchuluun	½–½	Đào Thiên Hải
Bayarsaikhany Gündavaa	1–0	Nguyễn Anh Dũng
Batkhuyagiin Möngöntuul	1–0	Nguyễn Thị Thanh An
Philippines	3–0	Palestine
Darwin Laylo	1–0	Atta Taamra
Ronald Dableo	1–0	Talal Shoubaita
Jedara Docena	1–0	Shadia Jaradat
United Arab Emirates	1½–1½	Japan
Taleb Moussa	1–0	Ryosuke Nanjo
Abdullah Hassan	0–1	Shinya Kojima
Noura Mohamed Saleh	½–½	Emiko Nakagawa
Sri Lanka	2½–½	Nepal
Athula Russell	½–½	Bilam Lal Shrestha
G. C. Anuruddha	1–0	Surbir Lama
Yasoda Methmali	1–0	Monalisa Khamboo
Bangladesh	3–0	Macau
Enamul Hossain	1–0	Rodolfo Abelgas
Reefat Bin Sattar	1–0	Mak Tong Kuan
Shamima Akter Liza	1–0	Chan I Sin
Jordan	1½–1½	Bye
Ahmad Samhouri	½–½	
Bahjat Al-Rimawi	½–½	
Natalie Jamaliah	½–½	

=== Round 9 ===
	Score	
India	1½–1½	Kazakhstan
Krishnan Sasikiran	½–½	Darmen Sadvakasov
Pentala Harikrishna	0–1	Murtas Kazhgaleyev
Koneru Humpy	1–0	Dana Aketayeva
Bangladesh	1–2	China
Enamul Hossain	½–½	Bu Xiangzhi
Reefat Bin Sattar	½–½	Wang Yue
Shamima Akter Liza	0–1	Zhao Xue
Qatar	0–3	Iran
Mohammed Al-Modiahki	0–1	Ehsan Ghaemmaghami
Mohammed Al-Sayed	0–1	Elshan Moradi
Zhu Chen	0–1	Atousa Pourkashian
Indonesia	2½–½	Uzbekistan
Utut Adianto	½–½	Rustam Kasimdzhanov
Susanto Megaranto	1–0	Alexei Barsov
Irene Kharisma Sukandar	1–0	Olga Sabirova
Philippines	1½–1½	Turkmenistan
Darwin Laylo	1–0	Meýlis Annaberdiýew
Ronald Dableo	½–½	Mesgen Amanow
Jedara Docena	0–1	Mähri Geldiýewa
Mongolia	1½–1½	United Arab Emirates
Tsegmediin Batchuluun	½–½	Taleb Moussa
Bayarsaikhany Gündavaa	0–1	Abdullah Hassan
Batkhuyagiin Möngöntuul	1–0	Noura Mohamed Saleh
Palestine	1½–1½	Jordan
Atta Taamra	0–1	Ahmad Samhouri
Talal Shoubaita	1–0	Bahjat Al-Rimawi
Shadia Jaradat	½–½	Natalie Jamaliah
Nepal	2½–½	Bahrain
Bilam Lal Shrestha	1–0	Maher Ayyad
Surbir Lama	1–0	Husain Ayyad
Monalisa Khamboo	½–½	Aysha Mutaywea
Japan	½–2½	Sri Lanka
Ryosuke Nanjo	0–1	Athula Russell
Shinya Kojima	½–½	G. C. Anuruddha
Emiko Nakagawa	0–1	Yasoda Methmali
Macau	0–3	Syria
Rodolfo Abelgas	0–1	Imad Hakki
Mak Tong Kuan	0–1	Jawan Bakr
Chan I Sin	0–1	Afamia Mir Mahmoud
Vietnam	1½–1½	Bye
Đào Thiên Hải	½–½	
Nguyễn Anh Dũng	½–½	
Nguyễn Thị Thanh An	½–½	

=== Summary ===
Rank	Team	Round									Total	BH
Rank	Team	1	2	3	4	5	6	7	8	9	Total	BH
1st place, gold medalist(s)	India (IND)	2½	3	2	2½	3	3	2½	2½	1½	22½	134½
2nd place, silver medalist(s)	China (CHN)	3	1	2½	2½	0	2	3	1½	2	17½	140
3rd place, bronze medalist(s)	Iran (IRI)	2½	1½	½	2½	1½	3	½	1½	3	16½	140
4	Kazakhstan (KAZ)	2½	½	2	2	½	3	2½	1½	1½	16	135½
5	Indonesia (INA)	3	½	3	½	1½	1½	3	½	2½	16	134½
6	Qatar (QAT)	3	2½	1	2	2	1	½	3	0	15	140½
7	Bangladesh (BAN)	2½	1½	0	½	2½	2	1½	3	1	14½	126
8	Philippines (PHI)	½	1½	3	1	1½	1	1½	3	1½	14½	110
9	Uzbekistan (UZB)	3	2	1	1	2½	0	2½	1½	½	14	140
10	Mongolia (MGL)	½	3	1	½	2½	2	½	2½	1½	14	123½
11	Turkmenistan (TKM)	3	0	1	2½	2½	0	3	0	1½	13½	131½
12	Syria (SYR)	0	3	2	1½	1½	0	2½	0	3	13½	112
13	Sri Lanka (SRI)	½	1	1	1½	1½	0	2½	2½	2½	13	87½
14	United Arab Emirates (UAE)	½	1½	2	2½	½	1	1½	1½	1½	12½	107½
15	Jordan (JOR)	0	3	1½	1½	½	3	0	1½	1½	12½	104
16	Vietnam (VIE)	2½	2½	2	½	1	1½	0	½	1½	12	129½
17	Bahrain (BRN)	½	2	1½	½	2	1½	0	3	½	11½	90
18	Palestine (PLE)	0	1½	1	1½	1	3	1½	0	1½	11	88½
19	Japan (JPN)	0	0	1½	3	½	2	1½	1½	½	10½	91½
20	Nepal (NEP)	0	0	2	1½	2	1	½	½	2½	10	91
21	Macau (MAC)	1½	0	0	0	1	0	½	0	0	3	98
