= Chess at the 2006 Asian Games =

- Venue: Al-Dana Indoor Hall
- Dates: 2–14 December 2006
- Competitors: 63 from 21 nations

Chess was contested at the 2006 Asian Games in Doha, Qatar from 2 December 2006 to 14 December 2006. Rapid Chess was held for men and women individually as well as a mixed team Standard Chess competition. All events were held at the Al-Dana Indoor Hall.

India topped the medal table with two gold medals, Kazakhstan won the men's individual gold.

== Schedule ==
●	Round	●	Last round

Event↓/Date →	2nd Sat	3rd Sun	4th Mon	5th Tue	6th Wed	7th Thu	8th Fri	9th Sat	10th Sun	11th Mon	12th Tue	13th Wed	14th Thu
Men's individual rapid	●●●	●●●	●●●										
Women's individual rapid	●●●	●●●	●●●										
Mixed team standard					●	●	●	●	●	●	●	●	●

== Medalists ==
Event	Gold	Silver	Bronze
Men's individual rapid	Murtas Kazhgaleyev; Kazakhstan	Đào Thiên Hải; Vietnam	Bu Xiangzhi; China
Women's individual rapid	Koneru Humpy; India	Zhao Xue; China	Zhu Chen; Qatar
Mixed team standard	India; Krishnan Sasikiran; Pentala Harikrishna; Koneru Humpy	China; Bu Xiangzhi; Wang Yue; Zhao Xue	Iran; Ehsan Ghaemmaghami; Elshan Moradi; Atousa Pourkashian

== Medal table ==
Rank	Nation	Gold	Silver	Bronze	Total
1	India (IND)	2	0	0	2
2	Kazakhstan (KAZ)	1	0	0	1
3	China (CHN)	0	2	1	3
4	Vietnam (VIE)	0	1	0	1
5	Iran (IRI)	0	0	1	1
5	Qatar (QAT)	0	0	1	1
Totals (6 entries)		3	3	3	9

== Participating nations ==
A total of 63 athletes from 21 nations competed in chess at the 2006 Asian Games:

- Bahrain (3)
- Bangladesh (3)
- China (3)
- India (3)
- Indonesia (3)
- Iran (3)
- Japan (3)
- Jordan (3)
- Kazakhstan (3)
- Macau (3)
- Mongolia (3)
- Nepal (3)
- Palestine (3)
- Philippines (3)
- Qatar (3)
- Sri Lanka (3)
- Syria (3)
- Turkmenistan (3)
- United Arab Emirates (3)
- Uzbekistan (3)
- Vietnam (3)
