= Salem Saleh (chess player) =

Emirati chess grandmaster (born 1993)

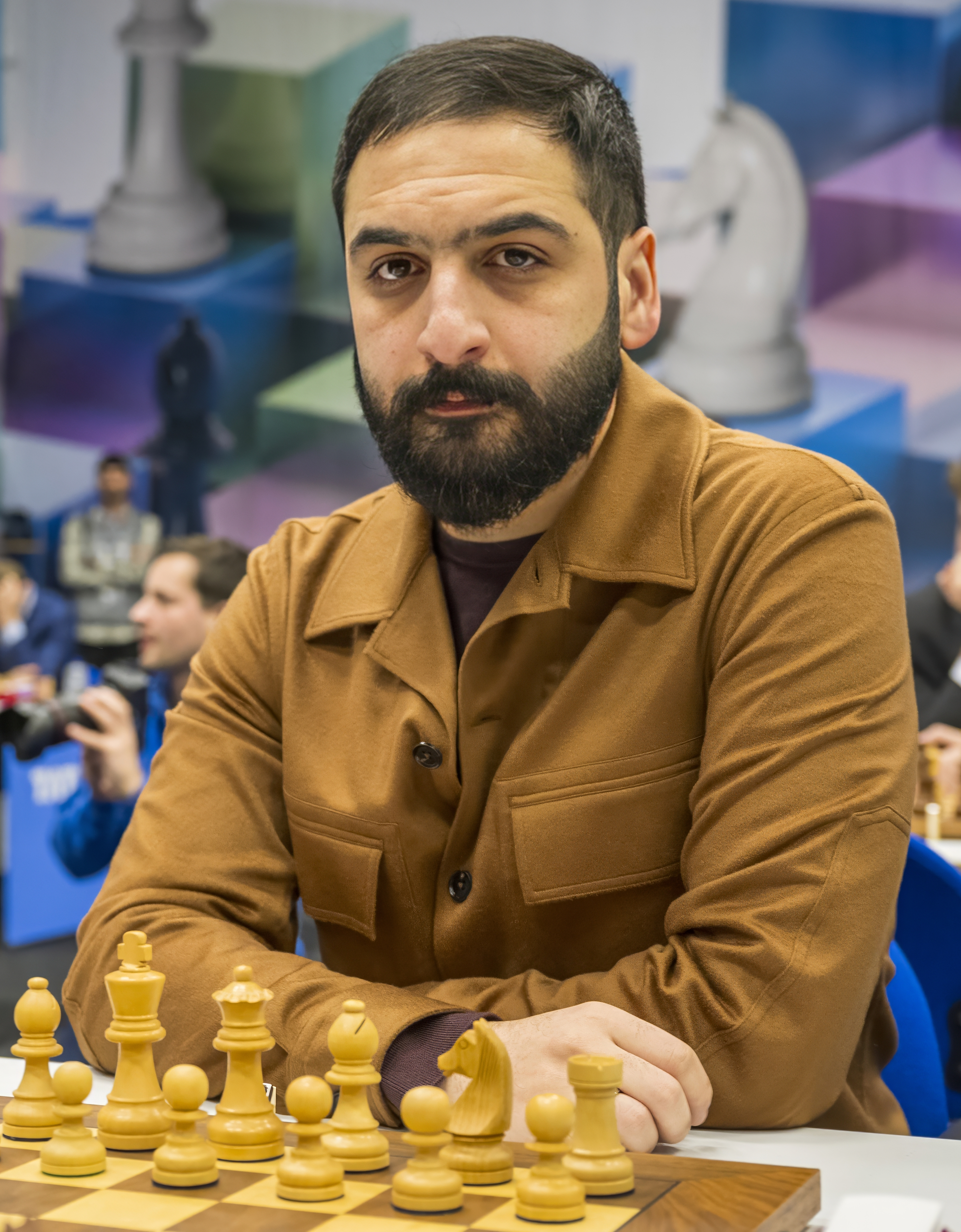
- Saleh in 2024

Personal information
- Born: Salem Abdulrahman Mohamed Saleh; 4 January 1993 (age 33) Sharjah, United Arab Emirates

Chess career
- Country: United Arab Emirates
- Title: Grandmaster (2009)
- FIDE rating: 2640 (July 2026)
- Peak rating: 2690 (October 2021)
- Ranking: No. 83 (July 2026)
- Peak ranking: No. 44 (December 2021)

Salem Abdulrahman Mohamed Saleh (Arabic: سالم عبدالرحمن محمد صالح, born 4 January 1993) is an Emirati chess grandmaster. He was awarded the title of Grandmaster by FIDE in 2009. Saleh competed in the FIDE World Cup in 2011, 2013, 2015, 2021 and 2023.

== Career ==
Born in Sharjah, Saleh won three titles at the Asian Youth Chess Championships: under 14 in 2007, under 16 in 2008, and under 18 in 2009. He won the Emirati Chess Championship in 2008, 2011 and 2012, and the Arab Chess Championship in 2008, 2014 and 2018. Salem Saleh won the Arab Individual Blitz Chess Championship 2017 and 2018. In August 2015, in Al Ain, he won both the Asian Chess Championship and the Asian blitz chess championship. In 2017, he finished in a tie for first place in the 1st Sharjah Masters international championship with Wang Hao, Adhiban Baskaran, Martyn Kravtsiv, Yuriy Kryvoruchko and S. P. Sethuraman.

Saleh has played for the UAE's national team on the top board in every Chess Olympiad from 2008 to 2016. He also participated in the Asian Nations Cup in 2016.

In August 2021, Saleh won the 2020 Biel MTO edition with a score of 7.0/9 and a rating performance of 2790.

In April 2022, Saleh won the 27th Sharjah International Rapid with a score of 8.0/9 and a rating performance of 2603.

== Personal life ==
Off the chessboard, Saleh works for Dubai Police in quality control management.
