= Emirati Chess Championship =

UAE Chess Championship

The Emirati Chess Championship is organized by the United Arab Emirates Chess Federation. It is one of the major national chess competitions of the United Arab Emirates held at standard time controls, the other being the UAE President's Cup, which has been held annually since 1994.

== Winners since 2001 ==
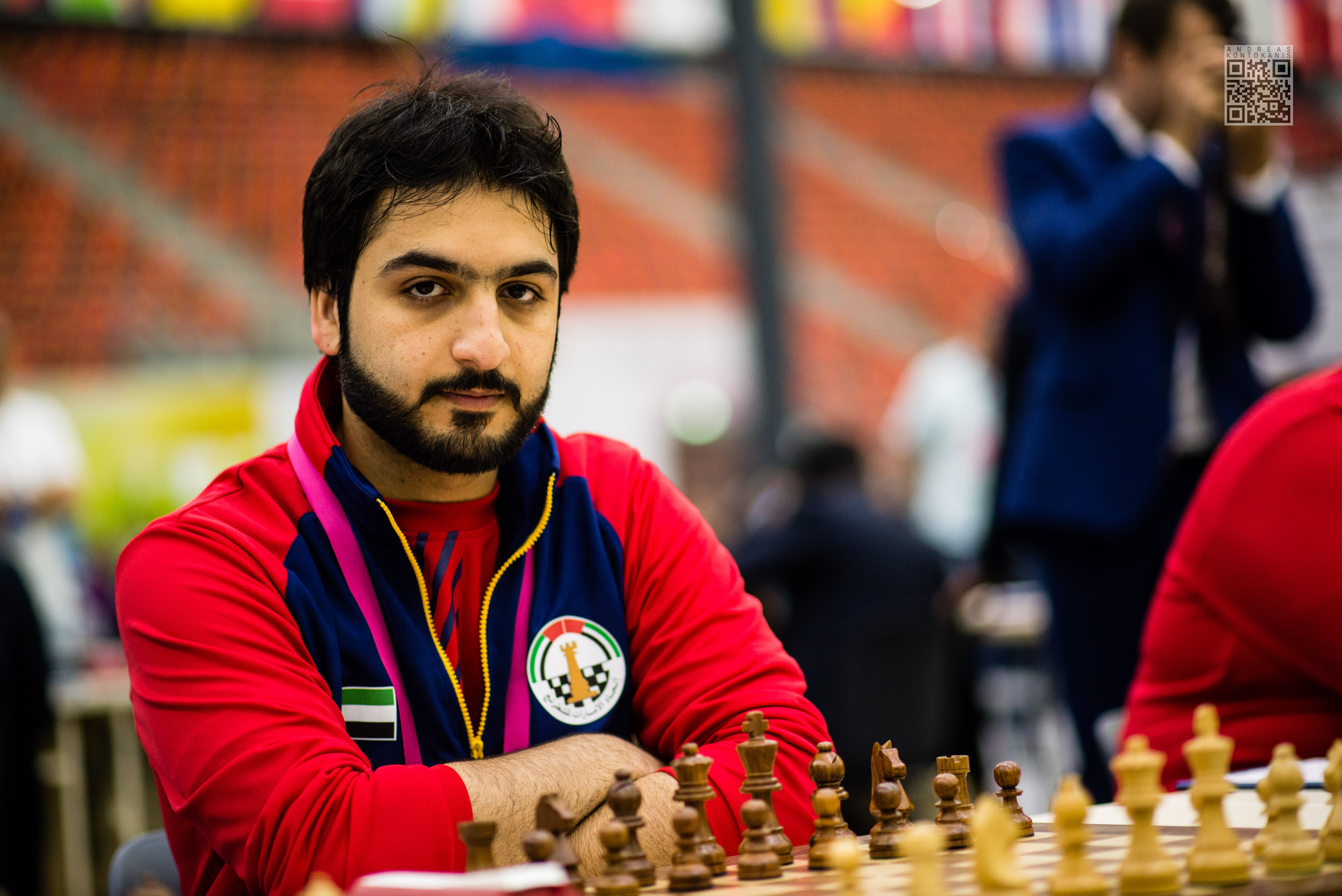
Grandmaster Salem Saleh, four-time Emirati chess champion

Year	Champion
2001	Taleb Moussa
2002	Nabil Saleh
2003	Taleb Moussa
2005	Othman Moussa
2007	Abdullah Hassan
2008	Salem Saleh
2011	Salem Saleh
2012	Salem Saleh
2015	Saeed Ishaq
2016	Saeed Ishaq
2017	Salem Saleh
