= Susanto Megaranto =

Indonesian chess grandmaster (born 1987)

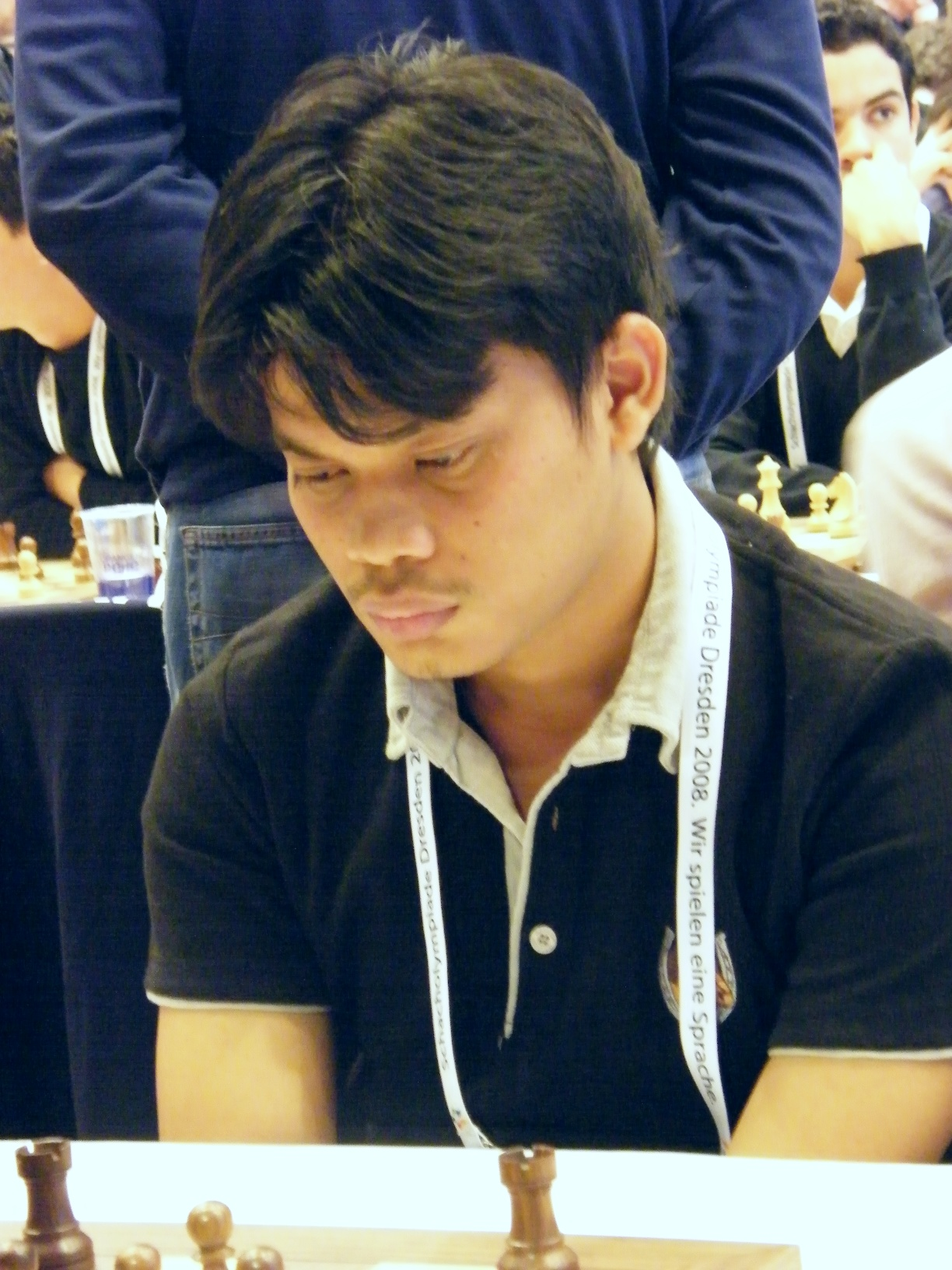
- Susanto Megaranto in 2008

Personal information
- Born: 8 October 1987 (age 38) Cirebon, Indonesia

Chess career
- Country: Indonesia
- Title: Grandmaster (2004)
- FIDE rating: 2486 (July 2026)
- Peak rating: 2569 (October 2007)

Susanto Megaranto (born 8 October 1987) is an Indonesian chess player. In 2004, he became the youngest Indonesian ever to qualify for the title Grandmaster at 17, beating out Utut Adianto's record by four years. He won the Indonesian Chess Championship four times in a row from 2006 to 2010. He graduated from Gunadarma University.

== Career ==
In 2004 he tied for 2nd-3rd with Eugenio Torre in the SEA Games in Vietnam. In the same year he tied for first with Mark Paragua in the Singapore Masters Open and won the event on tie-break. In 2007 he tied for 3rd-8th with Abhijit Kunte, Zhao Jun, Wen Yang, Darwin Laylo and Zhou Jianchao in the Asian Chess Championship. In 2008, he tied for 3rd-7th with Marat Dzhumaev, Darwin Laylo, Dražen Sermek and Ashot Nadanian in the 5th Dato' Arthur Tan Malaysia Open Championship in Kuala Lumpur and tied for 3rd-6th with Nguyen Anh Dung, Irwanto Sadikin and Magesh Chandran Panchanathan in the Kuala Lumpur Open. He took part in the Chess World Cup 2011, where he was eliminated in the first round by Lê Quang Liêm. In 2015, he won the first Asian University Chess Championship, which was held in Beijing.
