= Alexei Barsov =

Uzbek chess grandmaster (born 1966)

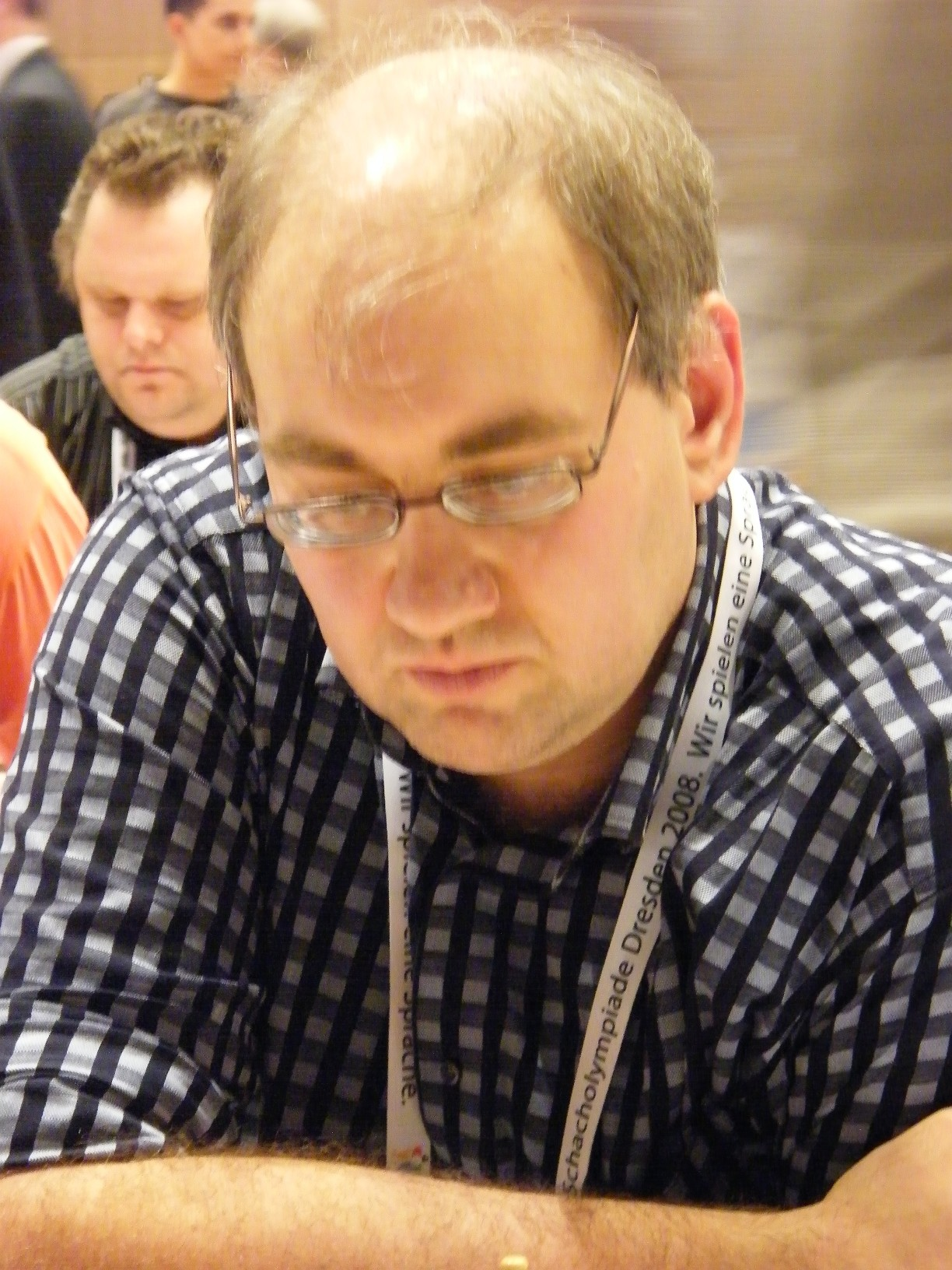
- Barsov in 2018

Personal information
- Born: 3 April 1966 (age 60) Samarkand, Uzbek SSR, Soviet Union

Chess career
- Country: Soviet Union (until 1991); Uzbekistan (since 1991)
- Title: Grandmaster (2000)
- Peak rating: 2550 (April 2002)

Alexei Barsov (Russian: Алексей Барсов; born 3 April 1966) is an Uzbek chess grandmaster.

== Chess career ==
Barsov, lawyer by education, has been a professional chess player since the early 1990s, and is one of the premier players in Uzbekistan. For some years he was the coach of the former FIDE world champion Rustam Kasimdzhanov.

He won the Zeeland Open in Vlissingen in 1995. Barsov's victories in Oxford (1998) and York (1999, together with Tiger Hillarp Persson and Julian Hodgson) rate among his most prominent successes in international chess tournaments. In 2001 he won the Hastings International Chess Congress together with Harikrishna and Sasikiran. Barsov competed in the FIDE World Chess Championship 2004, losing in the first round to Alexander Beliavsky. He won a tournament in Saint-Quentin 2004, and Casablanca 2005. Barsov won the Uzbekistani Chess Championship in 2006 and 2010. In 2011, he came first in the 4th Beirut Open tournament. In the following year, Barsov tied for first place with Semetey Tologontegin at the 2nd Central Asia Chess Cup in Bishkek winning the tournament on tiebreak score.

Barsov represented Uzbekistan at the Chess Olympiads in Istanbul 2000, Calvià 2004, Turin 2006, Dresden 2008 and Khanty-Mansiysk 2010. He has played for several European chess clubs, including the ones competing in the German Chess Bundesliga.

== Notable games ==
- Alexei Barsov vs Zhong Zhang, Premier 2001, Nimzo-Indian Defense: Three Knights Variation (E21), 1-0
- Peter K Wells vs Alexei Barsov, Premier 2002, English Opening: Agincourt Defense (A13), 0-1
