= Darmen Sadvakasov =

Kazakhstani chess grandmaster (born 1979)

Personal information
- Born: 28 April 1979 (age 47) Tselinograd, Kazakh SSR, Soviet Union

Chess career
- Country: Kazakhstan
- Title: Grandmaster (1998)
- FIDE rating: 2629 (July 2026)
- Peak rating: 2643 (October 2008)
- Peak ranking: No. 63 (January 2005)

Därmen Qanatūly Säduaqasov (Note: Often transliterated as Darmen Kanatovich Sadvakasov through a Russified Romanization of Дармен Канатович Садвакасов.) (Kazakh: Дәрмен Қанатұлы Сәдуақасов; born 28 April 1979) is a Kazakhstani chess player. He is a five-time national champion (2001, 2003, 2004, 2006, 2007) and a former world junior champion.

== Career ==
Sadvakasov was awarded the title of International Master (IM) by FIDE in 1995. In 1998 he won the World Junior Championship and as a result he was granted the title of Grandmaster (GM). The victory also qualified him for the FIDE World Chess Championship 1999. In this event he lost in the first round to Peng Xiaomin by ½-1½, thus exiting the tournament. He tied for first at Bali 2000 and the 2003 Samba Cup. In 2004 he competed in the FIDE World Championship in Tripoli. The next month he won the Politiken Cup in Copenhagen on tiebreak score over Leif Johannessen and Nick de Firmian. The following year Sadvakasov took part in the inaugural FIDE World Cup. In 2007 he tied for 1st–8th with Hikaru Nakamura, Alexander Shabalov, Varuzhan Akobian, Zviad Izoria, Victor Mikhalevski, Magesh Chandran Panchanathan and Justin Sarkar in the Miami Open. Sadvakasov also won matches against Viktor Korchnoi in 2003 by the score 5–3 and former World Champion Anatoly Karpov in 2004 by the score 4½–3½.
