= Mohammed Al-Modiahki =

Qatari chess grandmaster (born 1974)

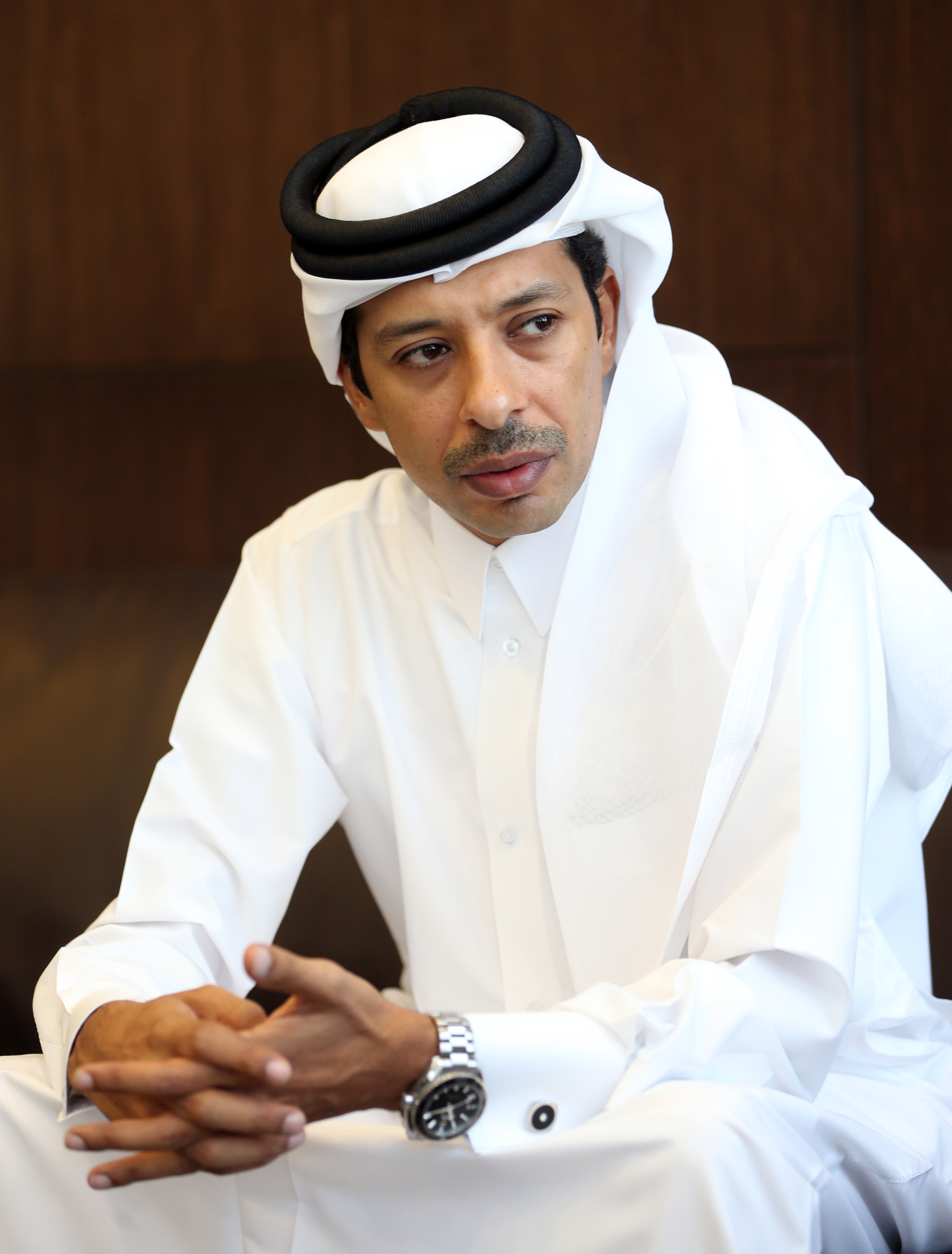
- Mohammed Al-Modiahki in 2013

Personal information
- Born: June 1, 1974 (age 52) Qatar
- Spouse: Zhu Chen (m. 2001)

Chess career
- Country: Qatar
- Title: Grandmaster (1998)
- FIDE rating: 2542 (July 2026)
- Peak rating: 2588 (October 2003)

Mohammed Ahmed Al-Modiahki (Arabic: محمد أحمد المضيحكي; born June 1, 1974) is a Qatari chess Grandmaster. He was the first player in Qatar to earn the title of grandmaster, and is the country's highest ranked player. He was awarded the trophy of the Player of the Century within the Arab Countries. He became an international master in 1991 and a grandmaster in 1998.

== Biography ==
Al-Modiahki has participated in nine Chess Olympiads in 1988, 1990, 1992, 1994, 1996, 1998, 2000, 2002 and 2006 with an overall record of (+60,=28,-21). At the 32nd Chess Olympiad in 1996 and he won the gold medal for his individual performance on the first board, scoring 8/10. A performance which he repeated at the 33rd Chess Olympiad in 1998, this time with 7.5/8. In 1994 and 2002, his individual performance earned him the bronze medal.

He played four times in the knock out stages of the FIDE World Chess Championships in Las Vegas (1999), New Delhi (2000), Moscow (2002) and Libya 2004.

He won the Arab Chess Championship on four occasions: in 1994, 1997, 2000 and 2002 (shared with Hichem Hamdouchi). Other victories include the Agadir Open in Morocco, Andorra Open (1999), the open tournament in Tunis (1997) and shared first places at the Goodricke Open in India (1995) and Benasque Open in Spain (1997).

In 2001, he married Grandmaster Zhu Chen, who now also plays for Qatar. In October 2003, he achieved his maximum FIDE rating of 2588.
