= Athula Russell =

Sri Lankan chess player (born 1983)

Personal information
- Born: 1 February 1983 (age 43)

Chess career
- Country: Sri Lanka
- Peak rating: 2274 (March 2011)

Majuwana Kankanamage Athula Russell (born 1 February 1983) is a Sri Lankan chess player.

== Chess career ==
He is a 6-time Sri Lankan Chess Champion, winning the championship in 2003, 2005, 2006, 2008, 2009, and 2010.

He played for Sri Lanka on board 1 at the Chess Olympiads of 2004, 2006, 2008. In 2004, he notably held draws against IM Ramón Mateo and grandmaster Carlos Matamoros Franco.

In March 2009, he finished in second place behind Laxman Rajaram and ahead of Srinath Narayanan and Anup Deshmukh in the Sri Lanka International Masters Chess Tournament.

== Personal life ==
His father was investigative journalist Victor Ivan.

He lives in Australia and works as a registered nurse.
