= Đào Thiên Hải =

Vietnamese chess grandmaster (born 1978)

Personal information
- Born: 10 May 1978 (age 48) Sa Đéc, Đồng Tháp

Chess career
- Country: Vietnam
- Title: Grandmaster (1995); FIDE Trainer (2011)
- FIDE rating: 2439 (November 2026)
- Peak rating: 2609 (April 2005)
- Peak ranking: No. 100 (July 1993)

Đào Thiên Hải (born 10 May 1978 in Sa Đéc) is a Vietnamese chess player and trainer. In 1995 he became the first Vietnamese player to be awarded the title of Grandmaster.

== Chess career ==
Hải made his international debut at the age of 11 in the 1989 World Junior Championship in Tunja, Colombia, finishing in equal 30th place with a score of 6/13. He won the 1993 World Under-16 Championship in Bratislava. Following this he was awarded the title of International Master; the Grandmaster title followed in 1995.

Hải participated in three FIDE World Championships knockout events. At the 2000 event in New Delhi, he defeated Ruslan Ponomariov but lost to Michael Adams in the second round. In Moscow in 2001, he lost in the first round to Gilberto Milos. He was once again eliminated in the first round at Tripoli in 2004, this time by Zdenko Kožul. In 2005 Hải competed in the FIDE World Cup, where he was knocked out in round 1 by Sergei Rublevsky.

In 2006 he won the 3rd IGB Dato' Arthur Tan Malaysia Open in Kuala Lumpur.

Hải has represented Vietnam at eleven Olympiads, beginning in 1990 at the age of 12, and at every Olympiad from 1994 to 2012. He also represented Vietnam at seven Asian Team Chess championships and at the 2006 Asian Games in Doha, Qatar, where he won a silver medal in the Men's individual rapid event.
