= Utut Adianto =

Indonesian politician and chess grandmaster (born 1965)

Deputy Speaker of the House of Representatives
- In office 20 March 2018 – 1 October 2019 Serving with Fadli Zon, Agus Hermanto, Taufik Kurniawan and Fahri Hamzah
- Speaker: Bambang Soesatyo

Member of the House of Representatives
- Incumbent
- Assumed office 1 October 2009
- Preceded by: Soeratal H. W.
- Constituency: Central Java VII

Personal details
- Born: 16 March 1965 (age 61) Jakarta, Indonesia
- Party: PDI-P (since 2008)
- Spouse: Tri Hatmanti
- Children: 1
- Parents: Ngatidjo Adiprabowo (father); Haryatin (mother)
- Education: Padjadjaran University
- Occupation: Chess player
- Chess career
- Country: Indonesia
- Title: Grandmaster (1985)
- Years active: 1980–2016
- FIDE rating: 2566 (October 2026)
- Peak rating: 2615 (January 1997)
- Peak ranking: No. 49 (January 1997)

Utut Adianto Wahyuwidayat (born 16 March 1965), commonly known as Utut Adianto is an Indonesian politician and chess player, who is serving as a member of the People's Representative Council since 2009. A member of the Indonesian Democratic Party of Struggle, he served as Deputy Speaker of the People's Representative Council from 2018 until 2019. Prior to his entry in politics, he was a chess player, attaining the title of Grandmaster from FIDE in 1986.

== Early life and education ==
Utut Adianto Wahyuwidayat was born in Jakarta on 16 March 1965. He is the fourth child of five children. He spent his childhood in Damai alley, near Cipete Market, South Jakarta. Utut studied at Padjadjaran University. He finished his studies in 1989, and worked in a in development company.

== Chess career ==
He was first interested in chess through his brother. In 1973, when he was 8 years old, he took lessons at the Kencana Chess Club. He won the Jakarta Junior Championship in 1978, at the age of 12. He then won the National Junior Champion in 1979. He would go on to win the Indonesian Chess Championship in 1982. He was awarded the title Grandmaster in 1986, becoming the youngest Indonesian to do so at the time (at 21 years old), though that record has since been surpassed by Susanto Megaranto, who became grandmaster at the age of 17. Between 1995 and 1999, he maintained an Elo rating of over 2600.

In 1999, he participated in the FIDE world championship in Las Vegas, held with the knockout format, losing to Daniel Fridman in the first round. Utut Adianto is chairman of the Indonesian Chess Federation (PERCASI), together with Machnan R. Kamaluddin, Eka Putra Wirya and Kristianus Liem, he later founded a chess school in Indonesia, which has produced several national players. In 2005, Adianto was awarded the title of FIDE Senior Trainer.

=== Notable games ===
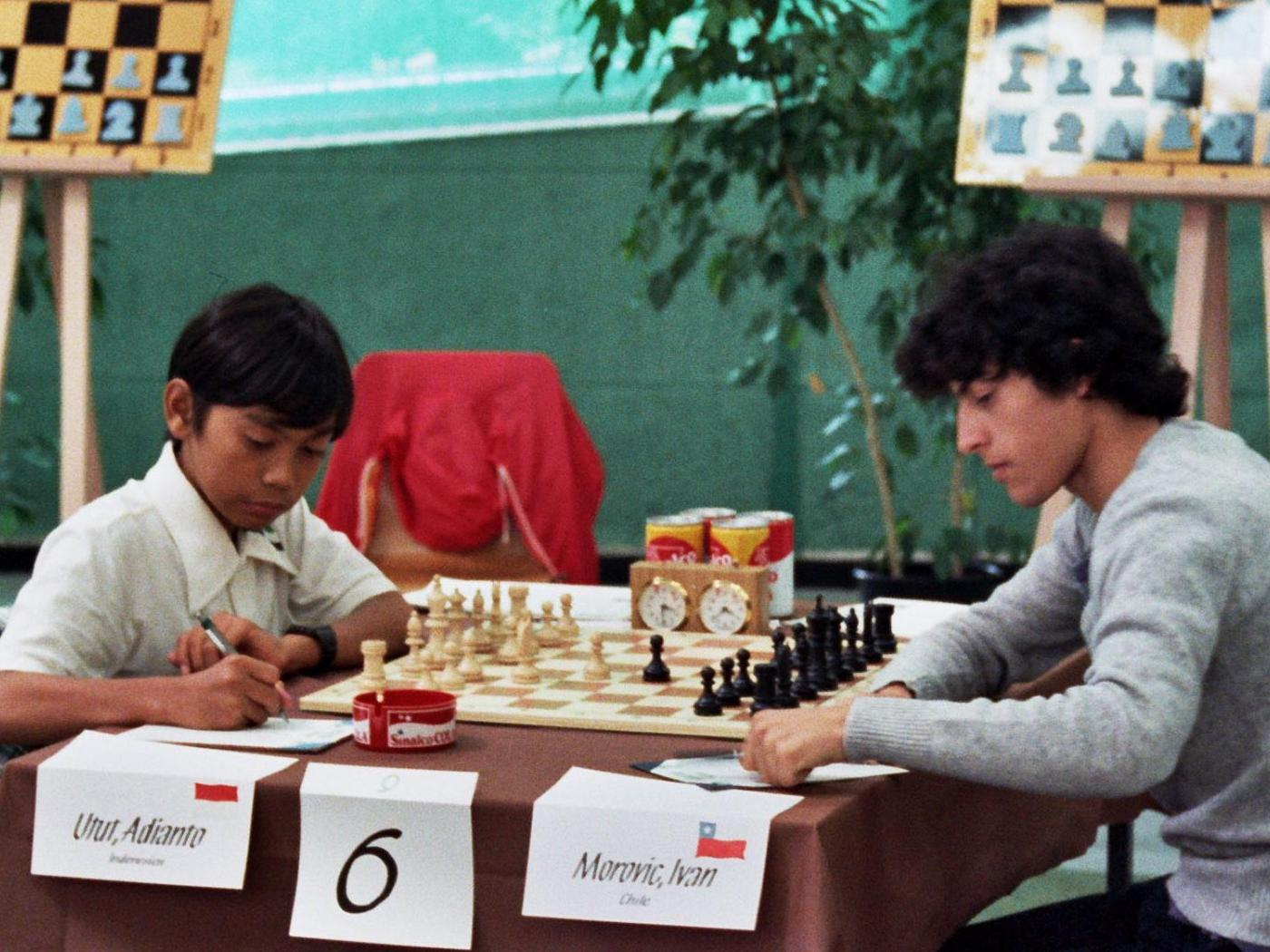
Utut and Iván Morovic, Junior Chess World Championship 1980 at Dortmund

The following is a list of notable games of Utut.

Notable games
| # | Date | Opponent | Result | |
|---|---|---|---|---|
| 1 | 2013 | Lang vs Adianto | 0 | 1 |
| 2 | 1998 | Handoko vs Adianto | 0 | 1 |
| 3 | 1997 | Karpov vs Adianto | 0 | 1 |
| 4 | 1996 | Hodgson vs Adianto | 0 | 1 |
| 5 | 1993 | Baburin vs Adianto | 0 | 1 |
| 6 | 1988 | Westerinen vs Adianto | 0 | 1 |
| 7 | 1986 | G. Pieterse vs Adianto | 0 | 1 |
Source :

=== FIDE ratings ===
Elo development
View chart definition.

== Political career ==
In recent years, Adianto had to cut down on his chess activities as he has been proactively involved in politics and government activities. On 9 May 2009, he was elected to the People's Representative Council (DPR), the lower house of Indonesia's bicameral parliament. He became deputy speaker of the DPR on 20 March 2018. He was reelected in 2024 with 116,794 votes.

== Election history ==
| Election | Position | Constituency | Political party | Number of votes | Election results |
|---|---|---|---|---|---|
| 2009 Indonesian legislative election | House of Representatives | Central Java VII | PDI-P | Unknown data | Winning |
| 2014 Indonesian legislative election | House of Representatives | Central Java VII | PDI-P | Unknown data | Winning |
| 2019 Indonesian legislative election | House of Representatives | Central Java VII | PDI-P | 206,622 | Winning |
| 2024 Indonesian legislative election | House of Representatives | Central Java VII | PDI-P | 206,622 | Winning |
