= Taleb Moussa =

Emirati chess grandmaster (born 1978)

Personal information
- Born: July 1, 1978 (age 48)

Chess career
- Country: United Arab Emirates
- Title: Grandmaster (2004)
- FIDE rating: 2406 (October 2026)
- Peak rating: 2517 (October 2004)

Taleb Moussa (Arabic: طالب موسى; born 1 July 1978) is an Emirati chess player. He was the UAE's first professional chess player and first grandmaster, a title he earned in 2004. He won the Emirati Chess Championship in 2001 and 2003.

In 2005, Taleb Moussa obtained a substantial sponsorship of Dh5.7 million.
