= Meylis Annaberdiyev =

Turkmenistani chess grandmaster (born 1985)

Meilis Annaberdiyev
Personal information
- Born: November 24, 1985 (age 40) Büzmeýin, Turkmenistan

Chess career
- Country: Turkmenistan
- Title: Grandmaster (2022)
- FIDE rating: 2427 (July 2026)
- Peak rating: 2537 (November 2021)

Meylis (Note: Also spelled Meilis.) Annaberdiyev (born November 24, 1985, Büzmeýin, Turkmenistan) is a chess Champion of Turkmenistan. He earned Chess Grandmaster title in 2022 1st FIDE Council.

== Notable tournaments ==
Tournament Name	Year	ELO	Points
Caissa Hotel Kumru GpA(Ayvalik TUR)	2022	2503	7.0
FSGM February 2020(Budapest HUN)	2020	2522	7.0
4th Mersin Open 2019(Mersin TUR)	2019	2515	7.0
5th Ordu Open 2019(Ordu TUR)	2019	2525	7.0
FSGM July 2018 (Budapest HUN)	2018	2501	6.5
FSGM February 2018(Budapest HUN)	2018	2479	6.5
5th Asian Team Men Rapid(Ashgabat TKM)	2017	2496	4.0
Hotel Sajam 14 GM 2016(Novi Sad SRB)	2016	2445	6.0
