= Maher Ayyad =

Bahraini chess player (born 1978)

Personal information
- Born: 5 December 1978 (age 47)

Chess career
- Country: Bahrain
- Title: FIDE Master (2004)
- Peak rating: 2174 (May 2012)

Maher Ayyad (Arabic: ماهر عياد; born 5 December 1978) is a Bahraini chess FIDE Master (FM) (2004) and Chess Olympiad individual gold medal winner (2002).

== Biography ==
Maher Ayyad won Bahrain's international chess tournament Ramadan Chess Championship twice in a row (2014, 2015). He is also known as a good fast chess specialist. Maher Ayyad ranked 2nd in the Kuwait Open Blitz Chess Championship in 2014 and won the Saudi Arabia Open Chess Championship in 2015.

Maher Ayyad played for Bahrain in the Chess Olympiads:

- in 2002, at the fourth board in the 35th Chess Olympiad in Bled (+7, =2, -1), winning an individual gold medal,
- in 2006, at the reserve board in the 37th Chess Olympiad in Turin (+8, =1, -2),
- in 2010, at the fourth board in the 39th Chess Olympiad in Khanty-Mansiysk (+4, =4, -2),
- in 2016, at the second board in the 42nd Chess Olympiad in Baku (+5, =0, -6),
- in 2018, at the second board in the 43rd Chess Olympiad in Batumi (+4, =2, -4).

Maher Ayyad played for Bahrain in the Asian Indoor and Martial Arts Games:

- in 2007, at the first board in the 2nd Asian Indoor Chess Games in Macau (+1, =1, -4).
