= Mohammed Al-Sayed =

Qatari chess grandmaster (born 1981)

Personal information
- Born: November 2, 1981 (age 44)

Chess career
- Country: Qatar
- Title: Grandmaster (2009)
- FIDE rating: 2484 (July 2026)
- Peak rating: 2530 (January 2016)

Mohamad Naser Al Sayed (born November 2, 1981) is a Qatari chess Grandmaster (since 2009). He is ranked 2nd best player in Qatar. As of September 2018, his FIDE Elo rating is 2484.

== Performance in competitions ==
Al-Sayed claimed the 3rd Arab elite chess championship title in Dubai, in June 2015.

He has played for Qatar at eleven chess Olympiads since 1994.
