= Shinya Kojima =

Japanese chess player (born 1988)

Personal information
- Born: November 15, 1988 (age 37) Zushi, Japan

Chess career
- Country: Japan
- Title: International Master (2015)
- Peak rating: 2432 (November 2018)

Shinya Kojima (小島 慎也, Kojima Shinya; born November 15, 1988) is a Japanese chess player. He has the highest peak rating out of all of Japan's chess players.

== Chess career ==
Kojima represented Japan at several Chess Olympiads, in: 2006, 2008, 2010, 2012, 2014, 2016, 2018, 2022.

Kojima won the Japanese Chess Championship five times, in: 2005, 2006, 2007, 2008, 2010.

In November 2022, Kojima won the Japan Open 2022, where he remained undefeated during the event. He won the Japan Open 2021 in the previous year, where he was the top-ranked Japanese player.

In July 2023, Kojima finished tied for second in the Japan Chess Classic 2023 alongside Trần Thanh Tú, Koya Matsuyama, and Samuel Song.

== Personal life ==
Kojima graduated from Keio University in 2011.
