= Reefat Bin-Sattar =

Bangladeshi chess grandmaster (born 1974)

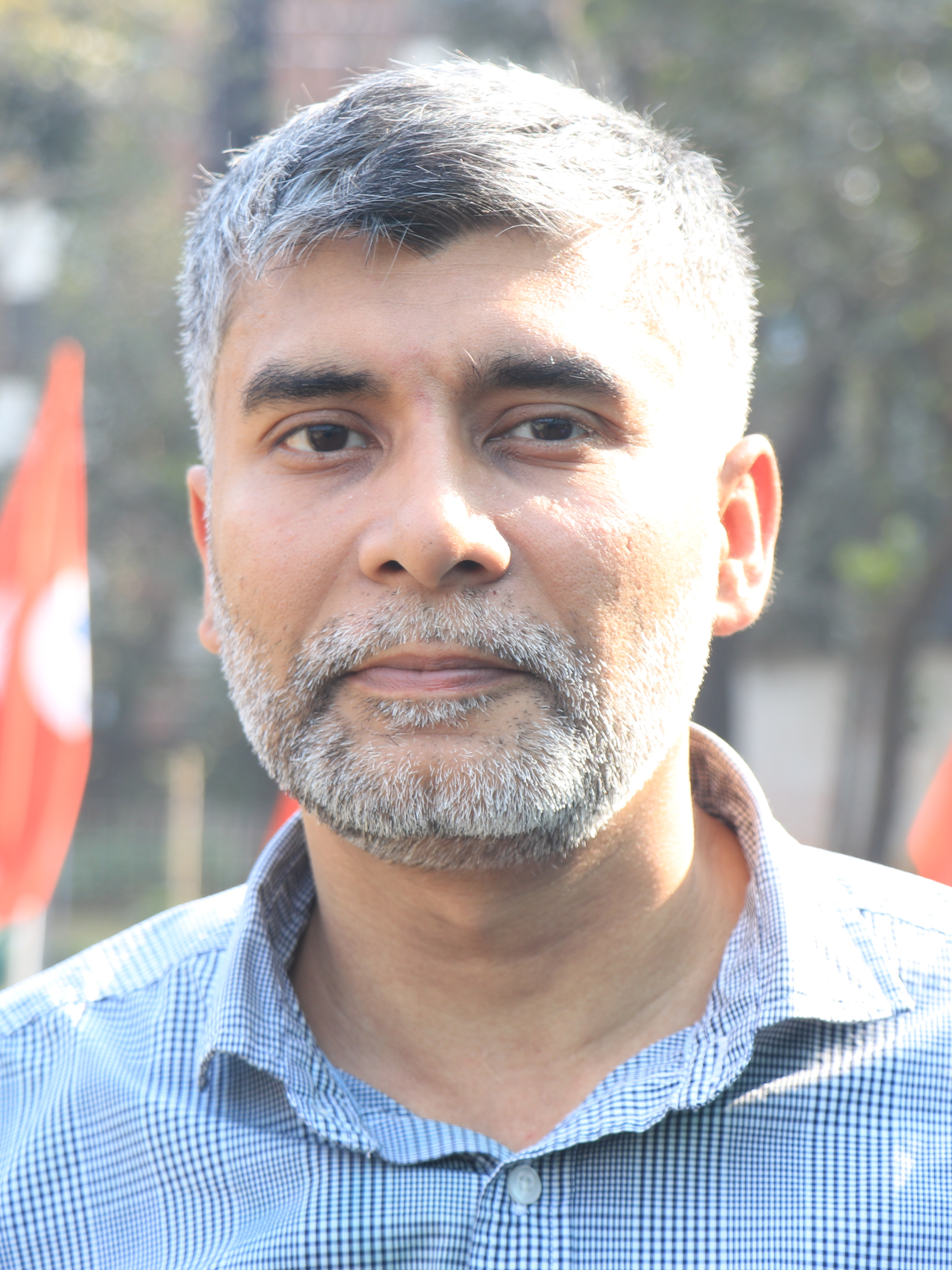
- Sattar in 2018

Personal information
- Born: 25 July 1974 (age 52)

Chess career
- Country: Bangladesh
- Title: Grandmaster (2006)
- Peak rating: 2492 (July 2005)

Reefat Bin-Sattar (born 25 July 1974) is a Bangladeshi chess grandmaster.

== Career ==
Bin-Sattar earned the International Master title in 1993 and Grandmaster title in 2005. All three of his GM qualifying norms were obtained at tournaments held in Dhaka.

Bin-Sattar has represented Bangladesh in seven Chess Olympiads from 1994 to 2006.
