= Ryosuke Nanjo =

Japanese chess player (born 1988)

Personal information
- Born: September 27, 1988 (age 37) New York City, U.S.

Chess career
- Country: Japan
- Title: International Master (2014)
- Peak rating: 2400 (September 2014)

Ryosuke Nanjo (南條 遼介, Nanjo Ryosuke; born September 27, 1988) is a Japanese chess player.

== Chess career ==
Nanjo was born in the United States and began playing chess in elementary school, becoming the 5th Grade U.S. Elementary School Chess Champion alongside Hikaru Nakamura. Nanjo then moved with his family to Japan at the age of 10.

Nanjo has won the Japanese Chess Championship five times, in: 2010, 2012, 2014, 2023, and 2024. He has also represented Japan at several Chess Olympiads: 2002, 2004, 2006, 2010, 2012, 2014, 2024.

In December 2018, he taught the top-level class at the Tokyo Bilingual Chess Club's Winter Chess Camp.

In July 2023, Nanjo finished tied for first place in the Japan Chess Classic 2023 alongside Mirai Aoshima, but lost on tiebreaks.

In October 2023, he finished second in the Nagoya Open 2023, behind winner Piotr Sabuk. Nanjo was the highest-finishing Japanese player in the event.

== Personal life ==
Nanjo graduated from Azabu High School, the University of Tokyo, and Keio University.
