= Mesgen Amanov =

Turkmenistani chess grandmaster (born 1986)

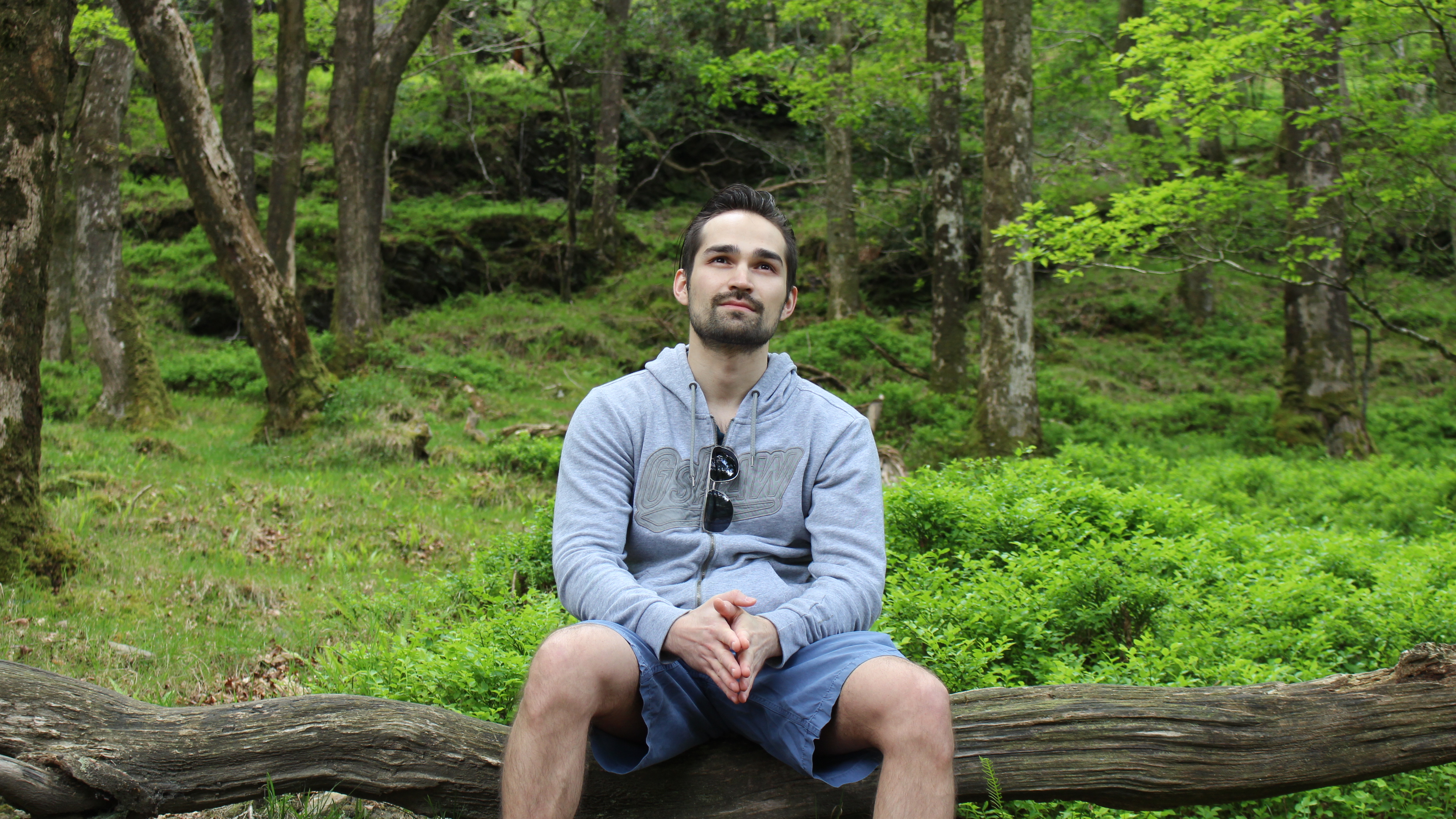

Personal information
- Born: 6 September 1986 (age 39)

Chess career
- Country: Turkmenistan
- Title: Grandmaster (2009)
- FIDE rating: 2436 (July 2026)
- Peak rating: 2541 (September 2011)

Mesgen Amanov (born 6 September 1986) is a Turkmenistani chess grandmaster. He is the highest rated player in his country, and has represented Turkmenistan in 4 Chess Olympiads. In January 2012 Grandmaster Amanov started MACA (Mesgen Amanov Chess Academy) in Illinois.

== Coaching career ==
Amanov went to Sport and Tourism University in Turkmenistan, majoring in chess coaching, he graduated at the age of 19-20.

Amanov raised/trained Awonder Liang to World Under-8 Champions in 2011 . His pupil Aren Emrikian became Under-8 World Chess Champion in 2017 and his another student Arthur Xu became silver medalist in the 2017 under-10 World Championship. In 2018, the article Amanov authored on uschess.org named "Path to the Podium: GM Mesgen Amanov on Training" was chosen the article of the year by uschess.org. In November 2018, Amanov coached his another pupil, Yuvraj 'Raj' Chennareddy, into Gold in the 2018 World Cadet Championship organised by the International Chess Federation, FIDE. His student Yuavaraj Raj scored 10.5 points out ouf possible 11, which was described as amazing by Chesskid.com author Fide Master Kostya Kavutskiy and as "dazzling" by the US Chess Federation website In 2019, the article Amanov authored on uschess.org named "A Perfect Triangle: GM Amanov on Coaching Raj to Gold" was chosen the second best article of the year in the "Best of Chess Life Online 2018" by US Chess Federation.
