= Pentala Harikrishna =

Indian chess grandmaster (born 1986)

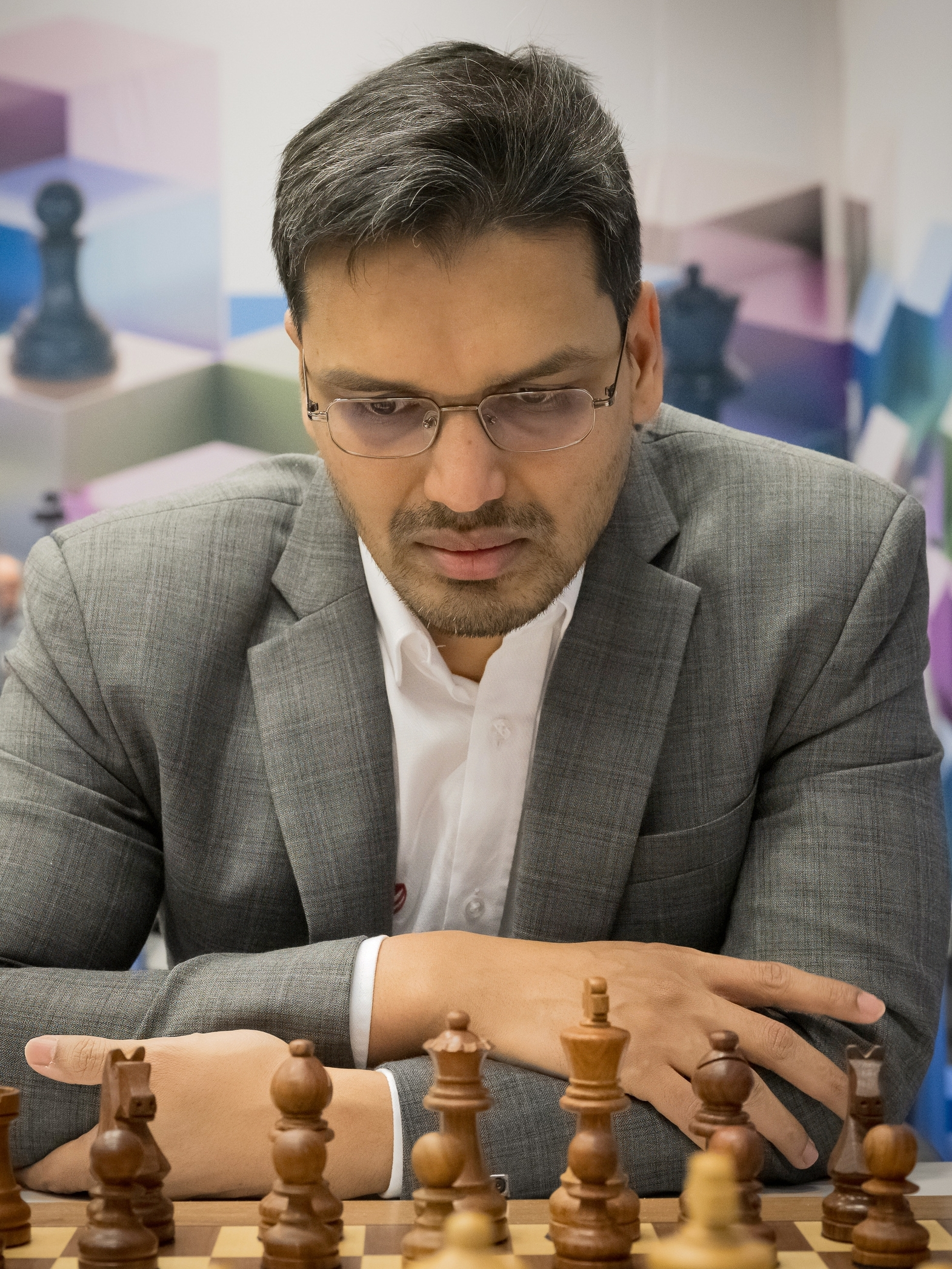
- Pentala in 2025

Personal information
- Born: 10 May 1986 (age 40) Guntur, Andhra Pradesh, India

Chess career
- Country: India
- Title: Grandmaster (2001)
- FIDE rating: 2648 (October 2026)
- Peak rating: 2770 (December 2016)
- Ranking: No. 69 (October 2026)
- Peak ranking: No. 10 (November 2016)

Pentala Harikrishna (born 10 May 1986) is an Indian chess grandmaster. He achieved a peak world ranking of 10 in November 2016, and a peak Elo rating of 2770 in December 2016.

On 17 August 2001, he became the youngest Indian to attain the title of grandmaster, a record which was subsequently held by Koneru Humpy, Parimarjan Negi, R Praggnanandhaa and Gukesh Dommaraju in that order. He was Commonwealth Champion in 2001, World Junior Champion in 2004, and Asian Individual Champion in 2011.

Harikrishna won the Tata Steel Group B in 2012 and the Biel MTO Masters Tournament Open event in 2013. He represented India at seven Chess Olympiads from 2000 to 2012 and won team Bronze at the World Team Chess Championships in 2010. At the Asian Team Championships, Harikrishna won his teams gold medal (2009) and two silver medals (2003 and 2012).

In February 2013, Harikrishna achieved an Elo rating 2700 for the first time, only the third Indian player to do so.

== Early life ==
Pentala Harikrishna (Note: Pentala is the family name.) was born in Guntur, Andhra Pradesh, India. He learned chess at the age of 4 from his grandfather Ranga Rao, who was also his first chess coach.

== Chess career ==
=== Junior ===
Harikrishna was a highly successful junior player winning the Indian Under-08 (1993), Under-10 (1995), Under-14 (1999), Under-15 (1998) and Under-18 (1998) titles. He won the Under 18 prize at the Commonwealth Chess Championship in 1999. He won the World Under-10 Championship in 1996.

His progress was such that, at the age of 14 years 5 months, he joined the Indian team for the 2000 Chess Olympiad, scoring 6.5 out of 11 rounds and earning his first Grandmaster norm. The second and third norms came soon after with a solid 6.5/13 result placing fifth in Corus Group B and sharing seventh place at the Asian Individual Championship with 7/11. This last norm both qualified him for the FIDE World Chess Championship 2002 (knocked in the first round to Alexander Beliavsky) and secured his Grandmaster title, having reached the required FIDE rating of 2500 in the July 2000 rating list.

=== 2001–2004 ===
Immediately after that he won on tiebreak the Commonwealth Championship, held in London, then claimed first on tiebreak with Alexei Barsov and Krishnan Sasikiran at Hastings Chess Congress at the start of 2002. Finishing half a point behind Sasikiran in the 2002 National "A" Championship. Despite a series of weaker results costing him 29 rating points between July 2002 and January 2003, Harikrishna regained nearly all of them the next rating period with third place at Hastings and second place at the National "A" Championship in Mumbai. He shared second place with Vasilios Kotronias and Paul Motwani in the 2003 British Championships then shared first with Vasily Yemelin, Smbat Lputian and Pavel Kotsur in Abu Dhabi.

Harikrishna's form continued with shared second at the Sharjah Open half a point behind Kotsur, shared seventh at the Parsvnath Open, shared fifth at the Tata Open and second at the Asian Zonal 3.1b tournament held in Dhaka, a point behind Surya Shekhar Ganguly and shared third at GibTelecom Masters, a point behind Nigel Short. A few months later he came sixth on tiebreaks (a dozen players tied half a point behind Shakriyar Mamedyarov at the strong Dubai Open.

Between the January 2003 and October 2005 rating lists, Harikrishna experienced a steady increase from 2539 to 2673, first reaching 2600 in July 2004.

Harikrishna was knocked out of the FIDE World Chess Championship 2004, held in Tripoli, in the second round after rapid tiebreaks 3–1 against Vasyl Ivanchuk but bounced back with fourth place on tiebreaks at the Abu Dhabi Open, half a point behind Dmitry Bocharov. He came third in the Pune Super GM event, a point behind winner Liviu-Dieter Nisipeanu but winning their individual game and was solid for India at the Chess Olympiad. This string of performances culminated in winning the World Junior Chess Championship held in Kochi, India in November 2004, scoring 10/13 with Tigran L Petrosian and Zhao Jun half a point behind.

=== 2005–2009 ===
Such success saw invitations to stronger events, such as Bermuda in early 2005 where despite losing to Boris Gelfand in the eighth round, victory in the two last rounds enabled him to catch up with him to tie for first, followed by an even score at Dos Hermanas and fifth on tiebreak at HB Global Challenge. Harikrishna joined up with former Viswanathan Anand coach Elizbar Ubilava, looking to improve his game. He then won the Sanjin Hotel Cup, a point clear of the field with 8.5/11. He tied for second at the Mainz Ordiz Open. An even result at the Lausanne Masters was followed up by winning the Essent Crown Group in October 2005, scoring 4/6. December's Chess World Cup 2005 saw Harikrishna defeat Yu Shaoteng 3-1 and Giovanni Vescovi 4–2 before being knocked out in the third round against Alexei Dreev 2.5-1.5, then tied for second at Pamplona, half a point behind Ruslan Ponomariov.

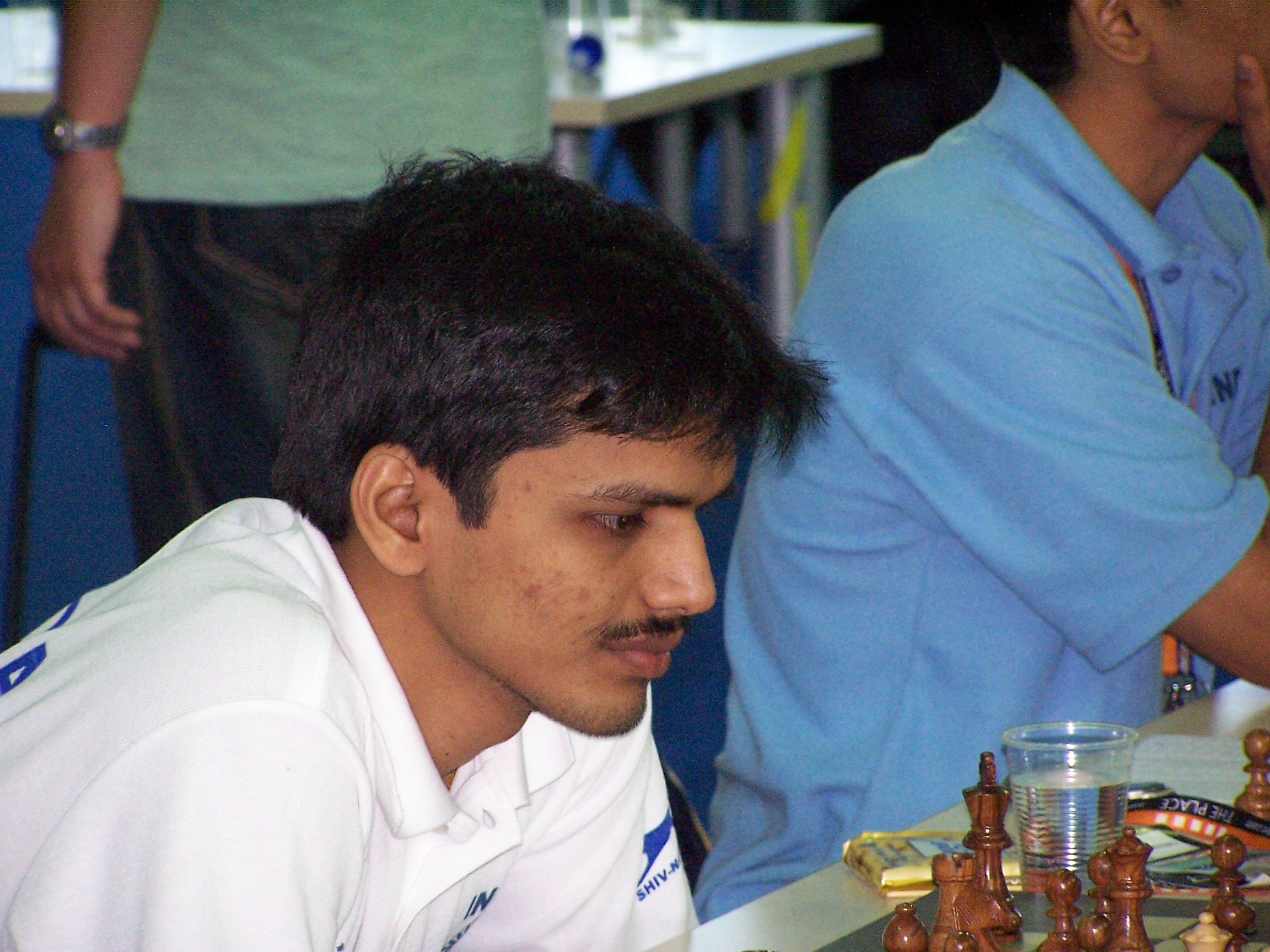
Harikrishna at 37th Chess Olympiad, Turin, Italy

In March 2006, Harikrishna tied for first (fifth on tiebreak) with winner Gabriel Sargissian, Ahmed Adly, Mamedyarov, and Igor-Alexander Nataf at the Reykjavik Open with 7/9. After competing in the 37th Chess Olympiad, he performed badly a month later with shared last place at Aerosvit, though he bounced back with victory at Marx Gyorgy Memorial then won the Chess960 Junior Chess Championship winning the last four games against Arkadij Naiditsch with the final score 4½–3½. 2007 started on a bad note with 3.5/9 at the Aeroflot Open but he recovered to come third at the Montreal International, losing in the final round to tournament winner Ivanchuk. Harikrishna tied for first (second on wins tiebreak) at Marx Gyorgy then finished 20th at the Mainz FiNet Rapid Open. At the end of 2007, he lost 3–1 in the final of the Carlos Torre Memorial to Ivanchuk and came fourth on tiebreak at the Reggio Emilia.

Harikrishna played tournaments less frequently after 2007 but finished fourth at the 2008 Corus Group B with 7.5/13, followed by several team events and winning on tiebreak in September 2008 at the Spice Cup in Lubbock, United States. He was seeded to the knockout stages of the XXI Carlos Tore Memorial but was eliminated 3–2 by Jan Ehlvest in the quarter finals.

A last round loss to Peter Svidler saw Harikrishna slip from co-leader to shared seventh at the January 2009 Gibraltar Chess Congress, but won the Nancy Rapid event the next month, a point ahead of Georg Meier. He lost three consecutive games at the 39th Bosna Tournament to finish fifth out of six and scoring 4/10, also struggling at Zurich's 200th Anniversary event, finishing shared 27th with 6/9. At the Chigorin Memorial he came fifteenth after tiebreaks in the Open section and won the blitz section. He finished the year helping India win the Asian Team Championships.

=== 2010–2013 ===
Harikrishna came tied sixth at Corus Chess Group B with 6.5/13 in January 2010 before a poor performance at the Asian Individual Championship, finishing 23rd after tiebreaks and losing 17 rating points Some consolation came with shared first with Ehlvest at the New York International. He shared second place scoring 7/9 at the World Open, half a point behind Viktor Láznička, but lost his rating gains at the Canadian Open with 6/9 sharing 23rd place. His strong performance in the Asian Games and Spanish league (including a win over Maxime Vachier-Lagrave) along with a solid performance in the Chess Olympiad helped recover his rating back to 2667 after a steady fall between April 2009 (2686) and July 2010 (2645).

In January 2011, he came ninth on tiebreak scoring 7/10 at Gibraltar then sixth on tiebreak with 6.5/9 at Cappelle-la-Grande. May 2011 he won the Asian Chess Championship after tying with Yu Yangyi and Nguyen Ngoc Truong Son 6.5/9, shared second place on 7/9 with Robert Hess and Alejandro Ramirez at the Chicago Open half a point behind Timur Gareev. Harikrishna's form dipped at the New York International scoring only 4.5/9 for shared 25th place, but shared third at the World Open scoring 6.5/9. He struggled at the World Team Championships competing against almost exclusively 2700 rated players, scoring 3.5/9 and was eliminated from the Chess World Cup in the second round 1.5-0.5 by Dmitry Jakovenko.

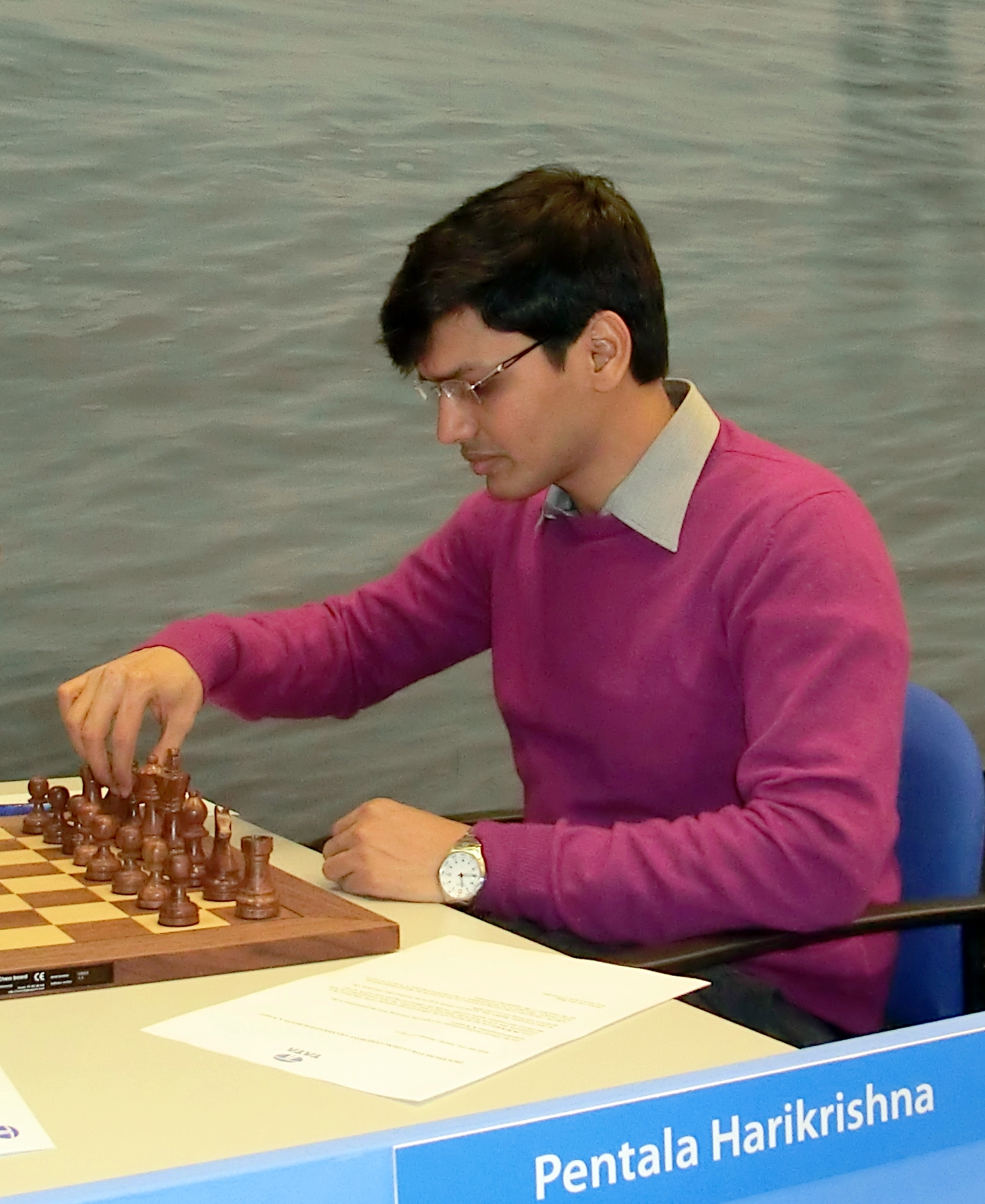
Harikrishna at Tata Steel Group A in 2013

Harikrishna started 2012 in style winning the Group B of Tata Steel, scoring 9/13, half a point ahead of Alexander Motylev and Lazaro Bruzon, earning himself a place in the 2013 Group A followed up with victory at the Cappelle-la-Grande Open on tiebreaks with 7/9. In July, he was third on tiebreaks at the Benasque Open scoring 8/10 and fifth on tiebreaks at the Biel Master event with 7.5/11. Harikrishna rounded off the year with the 40th Chess Olympiad and league games, ending the year at his highest rating so far with 2698.

Making his first appearance in the Tata Steel A group in January 2013, Harikrishna finished in seventh place with 6.5/13 and breaking 2700 for the first time. Despite a collapse of form at the Capablanca Memorial in which Harikrishna scored 3/10, losing four games and failing to win and pushing him back under 2700, his form returned in July with a strong performance in the Greek league, winning at the Biel Masters with 8½/11 and tied fifth place at the HZ Open with an unbeaten 7/9.

=== 2014–2016 ===
In January 2014, Harikrishna finished seventh in the rejigged Tata Steel Masters with 5.5/11 after a last round loss against Boris Gelfand and came 12th on tiebreak scoring 7/10 at Gibraltar soon after. After claiming silver at the Asian Blitz Championship, he played only league games until July when he finished third on tiebreak at Biel. Despite playing for the Indian team at the previous seven Chess Olympiads, he did not participate in the 2014 edition, taking part in the Turkish league instead. At the inaugural Qatar Masters he scored 5.5/9 to tie for 25th place.

Harikrishna started 2015 by scoring 7.5/10 for ninth place by tiebreak at Gibraltar, with several team events following including the World Team Championships in which he scored 5/9. In June, he won the 10th Edmonton International scoring 7.5/9, including a 5/5 start. An early second round exit from the World Cup against Sethuraman allowed Harikrishna to enter and tied for first from Gabriel Sargissian and Laurent Fressinet at the Isle of Man International on tiebreak, scoring 7/9. He rounded off the year by scoring an unbeaten 6/9 at the Qatar Masters Open for eleventh place on tiebreak.

In February–March 2016, he participated in IMSA Elite Mind Games held in China. He finished the event placed seventh in the rapid and third in blitz events gaining a staggering 113 points in live ratings to reach the career best rating of 2774 in blitz.

=== 2020–2025 ===
In July 2020, he won with 5.5 points out of 7 games the Chess960 event, that was part of the chess tournament in Biel. Because of COVID-19, the players were separated from each other by plexiglass. He also represented India in the FIDE Online Chess Olympiad 2020 where India won the gold medal along with Russia.

Through February and March 2022, Harikrishna played in the FIDE Grand Prix 2022. In the first leg, he placed fourth in Pool D with a 2.5/6 result. In the second leg, he finished fourth in Pool B with a result of 2/6, finishing 23rd in the standings with two points.

Hari worked as a second to Ju Wenjun during her Women's World Championship match in 2023.

At the 45th Chess Olympiad in September 2024, Harikrishna was part of the Indian team that won gold medal in the open section in Budapest.

Gukesh Dommaraju, the World Chess Champion, has revealed that Harikrishna was a part of his preparation team for the World Chess Championship 2024, which Gukesh won against Ding Liren.

He was part of the team that won the World Rapid Team Chess Championship in London in June 2025.

== Team results ==
Harikrishna has represented India at eleven Chess Olympiads, making his debut at the age of 14 years 5 months during the 34th Chess Olympiad held in Istanbul with results as follows:

Olympiad	Individual result	Team result
Istanbul 2000	6.5/11 (27th)	8th
Bled 2002	3.5/10 (102nd)	29th
Calvia 2004	5.5/11 (62nd)	6th
Turin 2006	8/12 (14th)	30th
Dresden 2008	6/10 (13th)	16th
Khanty-Mansiysk 2010	6/10 (19th)	18th
Istanbul 2012	5.5/10 (12th)	35th
Baku 2016	5.5/9 (11th)	4th
Batumi 2018	7/10 (17th)	6th
Chennai 2022	5.5/10 (29th)	4th
Budapest 2024	2.5/3 (13th)	1st

Harikrishna also took part in World Team Chess Championships, Asian Team Chess Championships and Asian Games events with results as follows:

Event	Individual result	Team result
13th Asian TCC 2003, Jodhpur India	5/8 (4th)	Silver
15th Asian Games 2006, Doha Qatar	6.5/9 (Silver)	Gold
3rd Asian Indoor Games 2009, Hanoi Vietnam	4.5/8	Bronze
16th Asian TCC 2009, Kolkata India	4/6 (Bronze)	Gold
7th World TCC 2010, Bursa Turkey	4/8 (6th)	Bronze
16h Asian Games 2010, Guangzhou China	6/9	Bronze
8th World TCC 2011, Ningbo China	3.5/9 (7th)	8th
17th Asian TCC 2012, Zaozhuang China	6/9 (4th)	Silver
10th World TCC 2015, Tsakhkadzor Armenia	5/9 (4th)	9th

=== Other team results ===
Harikrishna has played for a variety of teams in league events. He played for Baden Baden in three of their title wins from 2007 to 2009.

- Silver medal with chess club Baden-Baden 2008 in European Chess Club Cup, Kallithea, Greece.
- Greek league Champion 2008 and Bronze medal 2013. with chess club Kavala.
- Bronze in Russian league 2008 with chess club Elara.
- Spanish Team Chess Championship, 2005, Spain, Team Gold (first board player).
- Silver in Spanish league 2006 with chess club Cuna de Dragones.
- Four Nations Chess League (4NCL), 2006, England, Team Silver.
- In 2009, he participated in the League of Bosnia and Herzegovina with SK "Bosna" Sarajevo team that ultimately won the league.
- Spanish Team Chess Championship, November 2012, León, Spain, as a member of C.A. Solvay scored 4½/7 points on the first board; team finished second and qualified for European Club Cup.
- Bronze with Chess Club Kavala at Greek team Championship 2014. and silver in Greek Chess Cup 2014.
- Champion of Turkish Super League 2014 with chess club Istanbul Technical University.
- Silver medal with Czech club G-Team Novy Bor and individual gold medal on the 3rd board at the European Chess Club Cup 2014 in Bilbao, Spain.
- From 2012 to 2014, GM Harikrishna played first board for chess club Eppingen in Chess Bundesliga, and he is a member of Spanish chess club Solvay since 2007 (first board). Harikrishna is also the first board for BPCL A team, which has won PSPB Inter Unit Chess Tournaments in 2010 and 2011.
- Played the top board for China Mobil Shanghai chess club in 2019 edition of China Chess League, winning over Wei Yi from team Jiangsu, which placed him into top 20 list in world rankings (2nd highest Indian player at the time).
- In the Professional Rapid Online Chess League 2020, he played for the India Yogis.

== Personal life ==
He married Serbian chess player Nadezda Stojanovic in 2018. Their daughter Maya was born in March 2021. Since 2018, he has lived in Prague. He plays for the chess club Nový Bor.
