= Tsegmediin Batchuluun =

Mongolian chess grandmaster (born 1987)

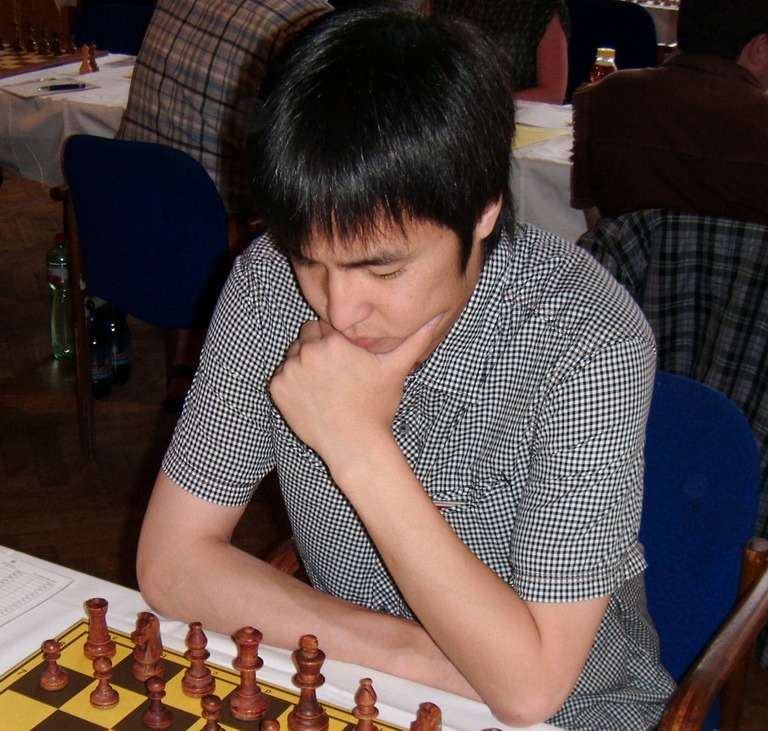

Personal information
- Born: February 4, 1987 (age 39) Ulaanbaatar, Mongolia

Chess career
- Country: Mongolia
- Title: Grandmaster (2012)
- FIDE rating: 2435 (September 2026)
- Peak rating: 2571 (October 2017)

Tsegmediin Batchuluun (Mongolian: Цэгмэдийн Батчулуун; born 4 February 1987) is a Mongolian chess player. He was awarded the title of International Master (IM) by FIDE in 2009, Grandmaster (GM) by FIDE in 2012.

== Chess career ==
Batchuluun Tsegmed is the Mongolian peak -ranked chess grandmaster of all time, and his international ranking of 2571 is still the highest ranking in Mongolia. He is the only chess player from Mongolia who represented his country 7 times in the World Chess Olympiad and successfully participated the World Cup for the first time. In recognition of his 26 years of hard work in chess, the President of Mongolia awarded him with the title of Mongolian State Honored Sportsman. In addition to being an official coach of the World Chess Federation, he is also a chess player of the Mongolian National League Team, a member of the Board of Directors of the Mongolian Chess Federation, and a sportsman with a military title of senior first-sergeant for the "Aldar - Sports Committee of the Armed Forces" under the Ministry of Defense. Besides his sports career, he founded the "Grandchess" chess club and works as a chess coach.

== Chess tournaments ==
- He led his national team in the World Chess Olympiad 2006, 2010, 2012, 2014, 2016, 2018, Online Chess Olympiad|2021. Top Mongolian chess player who played 7 times in the World Chess Olympiad from 2006 to 2021.
- He won the 5th place in the Asian Chess Championship in 2017 and was the first chess player from Mongolia to successfully participate in World Chess Cup.
- Six-time Mongolian Junior Chess Champion /1998, 1999, 2000, 2001, 2002, 2003/ and 2 silver, 1 bronze medals;
- Four-time Champion of Mongolia for adults /2006, 2014, 2015, 2017/ and won one silver and four bronze medals;
- Five-time National Blitz & Rapid Chess Champion /2005, 2006, 2008, 2010, 2017/;
- In 2014, he won the 4th place in the World Student Chess Championship;
- Silver medal at "Golden State Open" in America in 2015;
- In 2015, the first place in the "Warfare Class Open" competition in America;
- In 2016, he won the "New Year 2016 Open" in America;
- In 2016, he took the first place in the "First Great Mongolian Chess Festival" organized by the Global Fund of World Mongolians;
- In 2016, in the Asian Chess Championship held in Uzbekistan, has become the prize winner with 7 points without a single loss and took the 2nd to 9th places;
- Took the prize winning place in the "Xingyi Decoration cup" International Open Tournament for high-level chess players, held in Hainan, China;
- Placed at the 5th in the Asian Senior Chess Championship – 2017;
- Winner of the "ASTANA OPEN 2017" Competition held in Kazakhstan;
- At the "43rd World Chess Olympiad" held in Batumi, Georgia in 2018, the team achieved a historic success by winning a silver medal in Group B of the said Tournament;
- Participated in “QCD Grandmaster invitational" International Competition, held in Singapore and took the first place and won the award for the Best Chess Match.
- In 2022, he won the 4th place in the "National Open Chess Championship" in America
- In 2022, he won the 2nd place in the "Pacific Open Chess Championship" in America

== Education ==
- In 1994–2004, he has competed full courses of secondary education in the 93rd School for Talents of the Capital City;
- In 2011–2015, he successfully graduated from the National Institute of Physical Education as a sports coach and teacher.

== Awards /Titles, medals awarded in Mongolia/ ==
- "Candidate for Master" in 2000;
- "Master of Sports" in 2001;
- "Master of the World Chess Federation" in 2005;
- "FIDE master" in 2009;
- "Grandmaster" in 2012;
- "Altan Gadas" medal (badge), in 2017 \4th honored title of Mongolia\;
- "Mongolian State Honored Sportsman" (Chess player) in 2018 \the second honorary title of Mongolia\;
- "The best Mongolian chess player of the year " in 2017;
- "The Best pupil of the Capital city" in 2000;
- "Top Student" of the Mongolian Students’ Union in 2006;
- Credential for "Top student" awarded by the mayor in 2008;
- Title of "Senior First Sergeant of the Mongolian Army", conferred by Ministry of Defense in 2019;
- "90th Anniversary Medal of Physical Education and Sports" in 2011;
- "Top Employee of Physical Education and Sports" in 2011;
- "Sportyn Aldar - Glory of Sports" awarded by the State Committee of Physical Education and Sports in 2008;
- "Certificate of Credential " awarded by Ministry of Defense in 2012;
- "Medal for Sports Glory" in 2013;
- Sportsman with Title for "Celebrity of Bayankhongor province" in 2010, 2017 and 2018;
- "Military Glory” Badge of Honor in 2022

== Work experiences ==
- Sportsman (Chess player) of the Mongolian National Team since 2012 until now;
- Sportsman (Chess player) of the "Aldar Sports Committee of the Armed Forces" under the Ministry of Defense since 2008 until now;
- Official coach of the World Chess Federation since 2015 until now;
- From 2013 to 2016, he had worked as a coach at the Chinggis Chess Club in San Francisco, USA;
- In 2017–2019, he worked as a coach of the Mongolian branch of "Chingis" Chess Club
- Since 2019 until now, he founded the "Grandchess" chess club and has been working as a chess coach;
- Serves as member, Board of the Mongolian Chess Federation since 2019 until now;
- Since 2020, online lessons have been taught in America and Europe

== Social work ==
- In 2016, he successfully organized the "Shargaljuut 2016" high-ranking Chess Tournament of Mongolia named after his name.
- In 2019, he played with the best 20 chess players of Mongolia, and dedicated his monetary prize to the "Covid 19" Charity.
- Since 2019, he has been training as chess coach more than 300 children through his "Grandchess" chess club and successfully participated in Domestic and International
- As a senior chess player of the "Aldar Sports Committee of the Armed Forces" under the Ministry of Defense, he successfully organized trainings repeatedly.
- In 2021, he participated in a series of courses, organized by the World Chess Federation on the topic of "Socialization of Autistic Children through Chess", taught lessons to children with Autism in his chess club, and introduced a completely new experience to Mongolia.
