= Darwin Laylo =

Filipino chess grandmaster (born 1980)

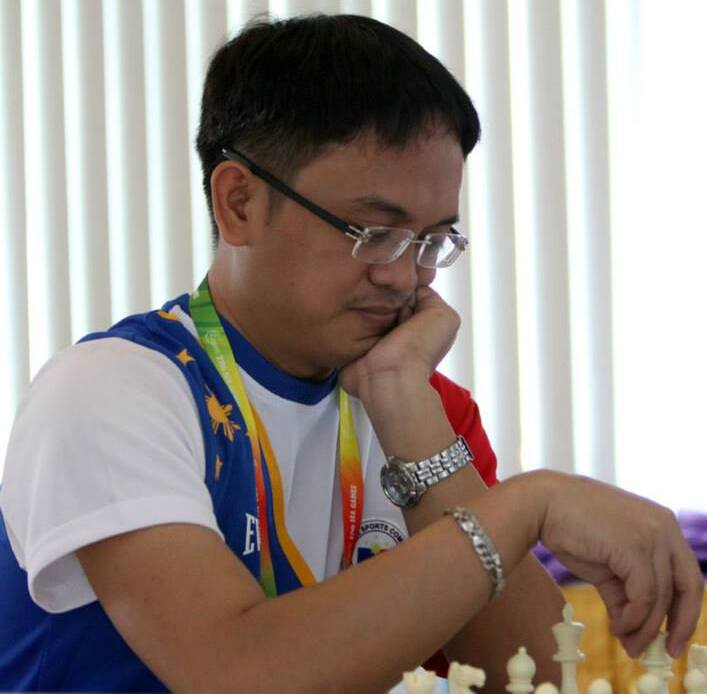
- Laylo in 2013

Personal information
- Born: June 1, 1980 (age 46) Marikina, Philippines
- Height: 1.75 m (5 ft 9 in)

Chess career
- Country: Philippines
- Title: Grandmaster (2007)
- Peak rating: 2556 (January 2010)

Darwin Laylo (born June 1, 1980) is a Filipino chess grandmaster.

Laylo won the Philippine national championship in 2004 and 2006. These wins earned him a place on the Philippine teams in the 2004 Calvià Olympiad and in 2006 at Turin.

In 2006 he gained two GM norms, the first from the 2006 Malaysian Open, and the second at the 2006 Bad Wiessee tournament in Germany. His third and final norm came in the 2007 Asian Chess Championship in Cebu, Philippines.

Laylo placed in the top ten of the 2007 Asian Chess Championship, earning a place in the 2007 World Chess Cup, November, 2007, in Khanty-Mansiysk, Russia. Seeded 113th out of 128 participants, Laylo was eliminated in the first round, 1½–½, by the French grandmaster Étienne Bacrot.

In 2008, he tied for 3rd-7th with Ashot Nadanian, Marat Dzhumaev, Dražen Sermek and Susanto Megaranto in the 5th Dato' Arthur Tan Malaysia Open Championship in Kuala Lumpur. In 2009, he came first in the Zonal tournament in Ho Chi Minh City.

== Chess career ==
=== Chess Olympiad ===
Event	Board	Individual result	Team result
Olympiad, Calvia 2004	Second Reserve	4.5/8 (26th)	19th
Olympiad, Turin 2006	Fourth	3.5/7	44th
Olympiad, Dresden 2008	Reserve	3.5/8 (20th)	46th
Olympiad, Khanty-Mansiysk 2010	Third	4/8 (39th)	50th

=== Asian Cities Chess Championship ===
Event	Board	Individual result	Team result
Asian Cities, Jakarta 2011	Fourth	6/9 Bronze	4th
Asian Cities, Tagaytay 2013	Fourth	6.5/9 Bronze	Gold

=== Asian Individual Chess Championship ===
Event	ELO Rating	Result / # of Participants	TPR
Cebu City Asian Chess Championship (6th) 2007	2486	7.5/11 (7th/72)	2631
Subic Bay Freeport Zone Asian Chess Championship (7th) 2009	2509	6.0/11 (34th/86)	2495
Subic Bay Freeport Zone Asian Chess Championship (8th) 2010	2527	5.0/9 (37th/90)	2474
Mashhad Asian Chess Championship (9th) 2011	2516	4.5/9 (22nd/50)	2465
Ho Chi Minh City Asian Chess Championship (10th) 2012	2502	4.0/9 (46th/72)	2384
Subic Bay Freeport Zone Asian Chess Championship (11th) 2013	2504	5.0/9 (28th/77)	2442
Xingtai Asian Chess Championship (17th) 2019	2433	5.0/9 (27th/74)	2510

=== Asian Games ===
Event	Board	Individual Score	Team result
Asian Games, Doha 2006	First	5/9 (55.6%)	8th
Asian Games, Tagaytay 2013	Fourth	1/4 (25.0%)	Silver

=== Asian Club Chess Cup ===
Event	Board	Individual result	Team result
Asian Club, Al-Ain 2008	Fourth	5.5/7 Bronze	4th

=== HDBank International Chess Open ===
Event	Starting Rank / ELO	Score	Result / TPR
HDBank Open 2011	9th / 2516	4.0/9	42nd / 2350
HDBank Open 2013	17th / 2496	5.5/9	25th / 2446
HDBank Open 2015	10th / 2499	5.5/9	14th / 2448
HDBank Open 2017	29th / 2445	4.5/9	52nd / 2302
HDBank Open 2019	36th / 2430	4.5/9	63rd / 2390
