= Imad Hakki =

Syrian chess player

Personal information
- Born: 1 January 1957 (age 69)

Chess career
- Country: Syria
- Title: International Master (1987)
- FIDE rating: 2354 (January 2012)
- Peak rating: 2471 (April 2005)

Imad Hakki (Arabic: عماد حقي) is a Syrian chess international master who represented Syria in multiple regional chess championship and the son of Badi' Hakki, a writer and novelist.

== Career ==
Hakki attended the Soviet Cultural Center in the seventies where he was taught professional chess by Ahmad Al-Rashidi. He participated in his first official championship in Damascus in 1973. He achieved International Master norm in 1987.

Hakki did not appear in the 1999 World Chess Championship because of visa problems. He received forfeit losses due to his failure to appear for his games. However, he went on to win that year's men's Arab Chess championship in Aden.

Hakki played many times for the Syrian Olympiad team, playing on board 1 in the 32nd and 34th Chess Olympiad, board 3 in the 37th, and on board 5 in the 38th edition of the Olympiad. Hakki played in his last championship in Jordan in 2012.

== Illness ==
After his championship in Jordan and the rise of the Syrian Civil War, Imad's health deteriorated considerably, and he had to get surgery for his eyelids, which the Syrian chess union didn't pay. The fees were paid by someone else.

Hakki later contracted Alzheimer's disease and became homeless, sleeping in the streets and parks of Damascus. As of 2021, he was in a senior home in Damascus.
