= Nguyễn Anh Dũng =

Vietnamese chess grandmaster (born 1976)

Personal information
- Born: 17 March 1976 (age 50)

Chess career
- Country: Vietnam
- Title: Grandmaster (2001)
- FIDE rating: 2400 (July 2026)
- Peak rating: 2567 (October 2004)

Nguyễn Anh Dũng (born 17 March 1976) is a Vietnamese chess player and FIDE Grandmaster.

His achievements include making it to the second round of the FIDE World Chess Championship 2002, and winning a team gold medal for Rapid chess at the Southeast Asian Games 2005.

== Personal life ==
His entire family plays chess. He's been married to Lê Thị Phương Liên, a Vietnamese Woman FIDE Master. Their daughter, Nguyễn Lê Cẩm Hiền, has won 2015 World Junior Championship in U8 girl section.
