= Krishnan Sasikiran =

Indian chess grandmaster (born 1981)

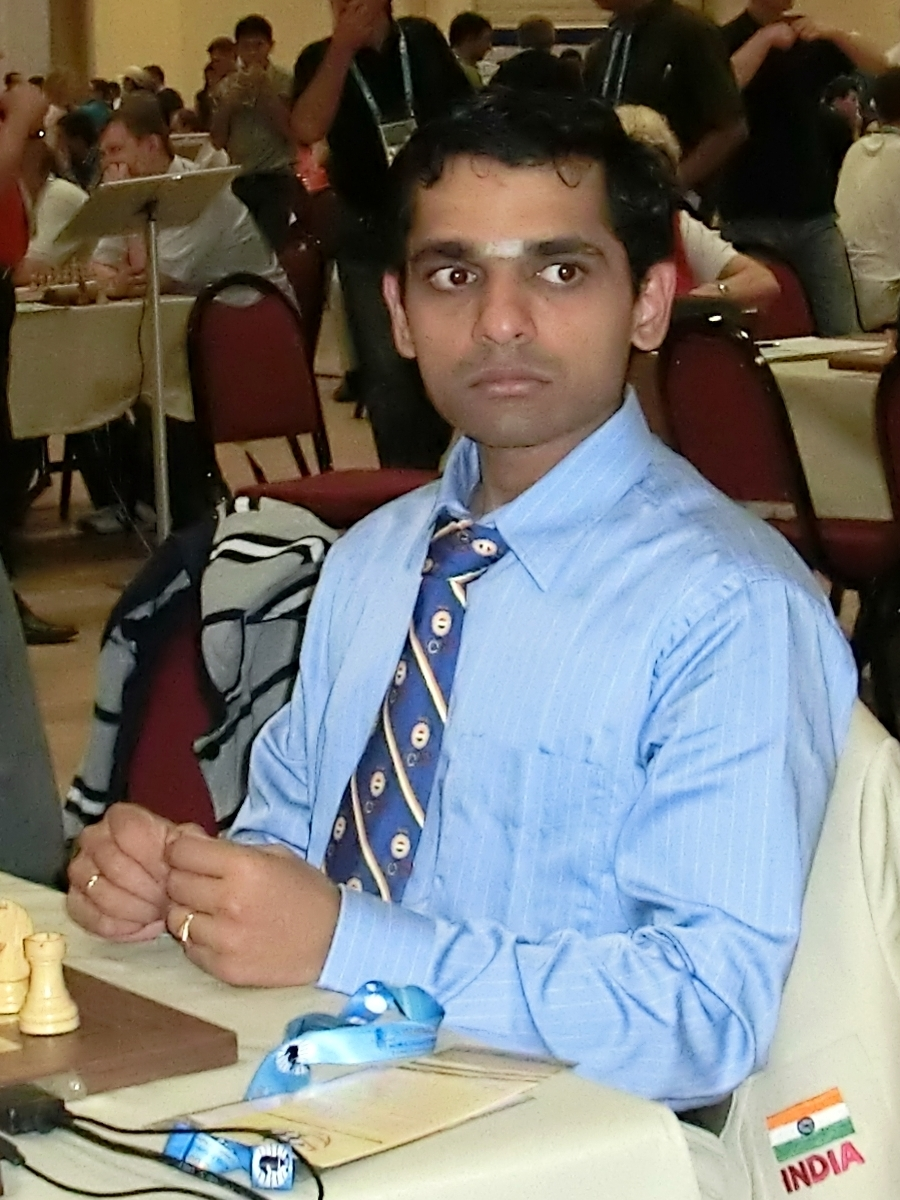
- K. Sasikiran in 2012

Personal information
- Born: 7 January 1981 (age 45) Madras, Tamil Nadu, India

Chess career
- Country: India
- Title: Grandmaster (2000)
- FIDE rating: 2515 (November 2026)
- Peak rating: 2720 (May 2012)
- Peak ranking: No. 21 (April 2006)

Krishnan Sasikiran (born 7 January 1981) is an Indian chess grandmaster.

He was one of Viswanathan Anand's seconds in the World Chess Championship 2013.

== Chess career ==
Born in Madras, Sasikiran won the Indian Chess Championship for the first time in 1999 and won it again in 2002, 2003, and 2013. In 1999, he also won the Asian Junior Chess Championship in Vũng Tàu, Vietnam. Sasikiran completed the requirements for the Grandmaster title at the 2000 Commonwealth Championship. In 2001, he won the prestigious Hastings International Chess tournament. In 2003, he won the 4th Asian Individual Championship as well as the Politiken Cup in Copenhagen. Sasikiran tied with Jan Timman for first place in the 2005 Sigeman & Co Chess Tournament, which took place in Malmö and Copenhagen.

In 2006, he tied for first place at the Aeroflot Open in Moscow with Baadur Jobava, Victor Bologan and Shakhriyar Mamedyarov, finishing third on tiebreak score. Later in the same year, Sasikiran won a gold medal in the 2006 Asian Games' team event. Tamil Nadu government presented a cheque of Rs 20 Lakhs as appreciation for his success. He was also bestowed with the Arjuna Award in 2002. In the January 2007 FIDE rating list, Sasikiran was ranked number 21 in the world with an Elo rating of 2700. He became only the second chess player from India to reach Elo rating of 2700.

In December 2008, he won City of Pamplona international chess tournament, a category 16 event with average Elo above 2640, by one-point margin with a rating performance of 2795. In 2009, he tied for 2nd-3rd with Étienne Bacrot in Antwerp.

In May 2011, Sasikiran won the Asian Blitz Chess Championship in Mashhad on tiebreak over Wesley So and Bu Xiangzhi, after all three players finished on 7/9 points. In October of the same year, he placed clear first in the open section of the 15th Corsican Circuit. He reached semi-final stage of the Corsica Masters knockout rapid tournament losing to eventual winner Anand.

At the 2014 Chess Olympiad in Tromsø he scored 7.5/10 points on board three to help the Indian team to win the bronze medal. Sasikiran also won the individual silver medal on board three.

== Correspondence chess ==
Krishnan Sasikiran is also a very successful correspondence chess player. In 2015, he achieved the title of an International Master (IM) and in 2016 he became Senior International Master (SIM). Norms for both titles he fulfilled at the Marian Vinchev Memorial and the Palciauskas Invitational.

== Personal life ==
Sasikiran completed his education in the Modern Senior Secondary School of Nanganallur, Chennai.

He is married to Radhika and has a daughter.
