= Chess at the 2010 Asian Games – Men's team standard =

Men's team standard at the 2010 Asian Games
- Venue: Guangzhou Chess Institute
- Date: 18–26 November 2010
- Competitors: 77 from 17 nations

Medalists
gold medal	China; Wang Yue, Wang Hao, Bu Xiangzhi, Zhou Jianchao, Ni Hua
silver medal	Philippines; Wesley So, Rogelio Antonio, John Paul Gomez, Darwin Laylo, Eugene Torre
bronze medal	India; Pentala Harikrishna, Krishnan Sasikiran, Surya Shekhar Ganguly, Geetha Narayanan Gopal, Adhiban Baskaran

The men's team standard competition at the 2010 Asian Games in Guangzhou was held from 18 November to 26 November at the Guangzhou Chess Institute.

== Schedule ==
All times are China Standard Time (UTC+08:00)

Date	Time	Event
Thursday, 18 November 2010	15:00	Round 1
Friday, 19 November 2010	13:00	Round 2
Saturday, 20 November 2010	15:00	Round 3
Sunday, 21 November 2010	15:00	Round 4
Monday, 22 November 2010	13:00	Round 5
Tuesday, 23 November 2010	15:00	Round 6
Wednesday, 24 November 2010	15:00	Round 7
Thursday, 25 November 2010	15:00	Semifinals
Friday, 26 November 2010	13:00	Finals

== Results ==
Legend

- WO — Walkover

=== Preliminary round ===
==== Round 1 ====
	Score	
China	2½–1½	Bangladesh
Wang Yue	½–½	Niaz Murshed
Bu Xiangzhi	½–½	Minhazuddin Ahmed Sagar
Zhou Jianchao	½–½	Ziaur Rahman
Ni Hua	1–0	Abu Sufian Shakil
Kyrgyzstan	½–3½	India
Algis Shukuraliev	0–1	Pentala Harikrishna
Nurdin Samakov	½–½	Krishnan Sasikiran
Nasyr Akylbekov	0–1	Geetha Narayanan Gopal
Semetey Tologontegin	0–1	Adhiban Baskaran
Kazakhstan	3–1	Yemen
Darmen Sadvakasov	1–0	Zendan Al-Zendani
Rinat Jumabayev	1–0	Hatim Al-Hadarani
Yevgeniy Vladimirov	1–0	Mohammed Othman
Rustam Khusnutdinov	0–1	Sabri Sallam
Jordan	½–3½	Vietnam
Marwan Aboudi	½–½	Nguyễn Ngọc Trường Sơn
Ahmad Al-Khatib	0–1	Cao Sang
Basel Al-Shoha	0–1	Nguyễn Đức Hòa
Fadi Malkawi	0–1	Nguyễn Huỳnh Minh Huy
Uzbekistan	3–1	Mongolia
Rustam Kasimdzhanov	1–0	Namkhain Battulga
Anton Filippov	0–1	Bayarsaikhany Gündavaa
Alexei Barsov	1–0	Gombosürengiin Mönkhgal
Dzhurabek Khamrakulov	1–0 WO	—
Iraq	1–3	Philippines
Araz Bassim	½–½	Rogelio Antonio
Hussein Ali	½–½	John Paul Gomez
Ahmed Abdul-Sattar	0–1	Darwin Laylo
Dhamir Jabbar	0–1	Eugene Torre
Iran	4–0	South Korea
Ehsan Ghaemmaghami	1–0	Lee Sang-hoon
Elshan Moradi	1–0	Kim Sae-byeok
Morteza Mahjoub	1–0	Jung Min-woo
Homayoun Tofighi	1–0	Jang Jae-won
Maldives	0–4	Qatar
Abdul Rahman Ali	0–1	Mohammed Al-Modiahki
Ahmed Fuad	0–1	Mohammed Al-Sayed
Ahmed Ashraf	0–1	Husein Aziz Nezad
Mohamed Hassan	0–1	Hamad Al-Tamimi
Lebanon	2–2	Bye
	½–½	
	½–½	
	½–½	
	½–½	

==== Round 2 ====
	Score	
Philippines	1–3	China
Wesley So	½–½	Wang Yue
Rogelio Antonio	½–½	Bu Xiangzhi
John Paul Gomez	0–1	Zhou Jianchao
Darwin Laylo	0–1	Ni Hua
India	4–0	Uzbekistan
Pentala Harikrishna	1–0	Rustam Kasimdzhanov
Krishnan Sasikiran	1–0	Anton Filippov
Surya Shekhar Ganguly	1–0	Alexei Barsov
Geetha Narayanan Gopal	1–0	Dzhurabek Khamrakulov
Qatar	1½–2½	Kazakhstan
Mohammed Al-Modiahki	0–1	Murtas Kazhgaleyev
Mohammed Al-Sayed	0–1	Rinat Jumabayev
Husein Aziz Nezad	1–0	Yevgeniy Vladimirov
Hamad Al-Tamimi	½–½	Rustam Khusnutdinov
Vietnam	3½–½	Iran
Lê Quang Liêm	½–½	Ehsan Ghaemmaghami
Nguyễn Ngọc Trường Sơn	1–0	Elshan Moradi
Cao Sang	1–0	Homayoun Tofighi
Nguyễn Đức Hòa	1–0	Asghar Golizadeh
Bangladesh	4–0	Lebanon
Minhazuddin Ahmed Sagar	1–0	Hani Mikati
Ziaur Rahman	1–0	Malik Barsawy
Abu Sufian Shakil	1–0	Tarek Modallal
Mehdi Hasan Parag	1–0 WO	—
Mongolia	2–2	Kyrgyzstan
Namkhain Battulga	½–½	Algis Shukuraliev
Bayarsaikhany Gündavaa	1–0	Nurdin Samakov
Gombosürengiin Mönkhgal	½–½	Nasyr Akylbekov
—	0–1 WO	Semetey Tologontegin
Yemen	3–1	Iraq
Basheer Al-Qudaimi	½–½	Araz Bassim
Zendan Al-Zendani	½–½	Hussein Ali
Hatim Al-Hadarani	1–0	Ahmed Abdul-Sattar
Sabri Sallam	1–0	Dhamir Jabbar
South Korea	3½–½	Jordan
Lee Sang-hoon	1–0	Marwan Aboudi
Kim Sae-byeok	1–0	Ahmad Al-Khatib
Lee Ki-yul	½–½	Basel Al-Shoha
Jung Min-woo	1–0	Fadi Malkawi
Maldives	2–2	Bye
	½–½	
	½–½	
	½–½	
	½–½	

==== Round 3 ====
	Score	
China	2½–1½	Vietnam
Wang Yue	1–0	Lê Quang Liêm
Wang Hao	½–½	Nguyễn Ngọc Trường Sơn
Zhou Jianchao	0–1	Nguyễn Đức Hòa
Ni Hua	1–0	Nguyễn Huỳnh Minh Huy
Kazakhstan	1½–2½	India
Murtas Kazhgaleyev	½–½	Pentala Harikrishna
Darmen Sadvakasov	½–½	Krishnan Sasikiran
Rinat Jumabayev	½–½	Surya Shekhar Ganguly
Yevgeniy Vladimirov	0–1	Geetha Narayanan Gopal
Uzbekistan	3–1	Qatar
Rustam Kasimdzhanov	½–½	Mohammed Al-Modiahki
Anton Filippov	1–0	Mohammed Al-Sayed
Alexei Barsov	½–½	Husein Aziz Nezad
Dzhurabek Khamrakulov	1–0	Hamad Al-Tamimi
Bangladesh	1–3	Philippines
Niaz Murshed	0–1	Wesley So
Minhazuddin Ahmed Sagar	0–1	Rogelio Antonio
Ziaur Rahman	½–½	John Paul Gomez
Abu Sufian Shakil	½–½	Eugene Torre
Iran	4–0	Yemen
Ehsan Ghaemmaghami	1–0	Basheer Al-Qudaimi
Elshan Moradi	1–0	Zendan Al-Zendani
Morteza Mahjoub	1–0	Hatim Al-Hadarani
Asghar Golizadeh	1–0	Mohammed Othman
Kyrgyzstan	4–0	South Korea
Algis Shukuraliev	1–0	Lee Sang-hoon
Nurdin Samakov	1–0	Kim Sae-byeok
Nasyr Akylbekov	1–0	Lee Ki-yul
Semetey Tologontegin	1–0	Jung Min-woo
Lebanon	1–3	Maldives
Hani Mikati	0–1	Abdul Rahman Ali
Malik Barsawy	0–1	Ahmed Fuad
Tarek Modallal	1–0	Ahmed Ashraf
—	0–1 WO	Mohamed Hassan
Jordan	1½–2½	Mongolia
Marwan Aboudi	½–½	Namkhain Battulga
Ahmad Al-Khatib	0–1	Bayarsaikhany Gündavaa
Basel Al-Shoha	0–1	Gombosürengiin Mönkhgal
Fadi Malkawi	1–0 WO	—
Iraq	2–2	Bye
	½–½	
	½–½	
	½–½	
	½–½	

==== Round 4 ====
	Score	
India	1½–2½	China
Pentala Harikrishna	½–½	Wang Yue
Krishnan Sasikiran	½–½	Wang Hao
Surya Shekhar Ganguly	½–½	Bu Xiangzhi
Geetha Narayanan Gopal	0–1	Ni Hua
Philippines	2½–1½	Kazakhstan
Wesley So	½–½	Murtas Kazhgaleyev
Rogelio Antonio	½–½	Darmen Sadvakasov
John Paul Gomez	1–0	Rinat Jumabayev
Eugene Torre	½–½	Rustam Khusnutdinov
Vietnam	2–2	Uzbekistan
Lê Quang Liêm	0–1	Rustam Kasimdzhanov
Nguyễn Ngọc Trường Sơn	1–0	Anton Filippov
Cao Sang	1–0	Alexei Barsov
Nguyễn Đức Hòa	0–1	Dzhurabek Khamrakulov
Mongolia	2–2	Iran
Namkhain Battulga	½–½	Ehsan Ghaemmaghami
Bayarsaikhany Gündavaa	1–0	Elshan Moradi
Gombosürengiin Mönkhgal	½–½	Morteza Mahjoub
—	0–1 WO	Homayoun Tofighi
Maldives	1–3	Kyrgyzstan
Abdul Rahman Ali	0–1	Algis Shukuraliev
Ahmed Fuad	0–1	Nurdin Samakov
Ahmed Ashraf	1–0	Nasyr Akylbekov
Mohamed Hassan	0–1	Semetey Tologontegin
Qatar	3½–½	Yemen
Mohammed Al-Modiahki	1–0	Basheer Al-Qudaimi
Mohammed Al-Sayed	1–0	Zendan Al-Zendani
Husein Aziz Nezad	1–0	Mohammed Othman
Hamad Al-Tamimi	½–½	Sabri Sallam
South Korea	0–4	Bangladesh
Lee Sang-hoon	0–1	Minhazuddin Ahmed Sagar
Lee Ki-yul	0–1	Ziaur Rahman
Jung Min-woo	0–1	Abu Sufian Shakil
Jang Jae-won	0–1	Mehdi Hasan Parag
Iraq	4–0	Lebanon
Araz Bassim	1–0 WO	Hani Mikati
Hussein Ali	1–0 WO	Malik Barsawy
Ahmed Abdul-Sattar	1–0 WO	Tarek Modallal
Dhamir Jabbar	1–0 WO	—
Jordan	2–2	Bye
	½–½	
	½–½	
	½–½	
	½–½	

==== Round 5 ====
	Score	
China	3–1	Iran
Wang Yue	½–½	Ehsan Ghaemmaghami
Wang Hao	½–½	Morteza Mahjoub
Bu Xiangzhi	1–0	Homayoun Tofighi
Zhou Jianchao	1–0	Asghar Golizadeh
Philippines	2½–1½	India
Wesley So	1–0	Pentala Harikrishna
Rogelio Antonio	½–½	Krishnan Sasikiran
John Paul Gomez	0–1	Surya Shekhar Ganguly
Eugene Torre	1–0	Adhiban Baskaran
Kyrgyzstan	3½–½	Vietnam
Algis Shukuraliev	1–0	Lê Quang Liêm
Nurdin Samakov	1–0	Nguyễn Ngọc Trường Sơn
Nasyr Akylbekov	1–0	Cao Sang
Semetey Tologontegin	½–½	Nguyễn Huỳnh Minh Huy
Uzbekistan	2–2	Kazakhstan
Rustam Kasimdzhanov	½–½	Murtas Kazhgaleyev
Anton Filippov	½–½	Darmen Sadvakasov
Alexei Barsov	1–0	Rinat Jumabayev
Dzhurabek Khamrakulov	0–1	Rustam Khusnutdinov
Bangladesh	1½–2½	Qatar
Niaz Murshed	0–1	Mohammed Al-Modiahki
Minhazuddin Ahmed Sagar	1–0	Mohammed Al-Sayed
Ziaur Rahman	0–1	Husein Aziz Nezad
Abu Sufian Shakil	½–½	Hamad Al-Tamimi
Iraq	2½–1½	Mongolia
Araz Bassim	1–0	Namkhain Battulga
Hussein Ali	0–1	Bayarsaikhany Gündavaa
Ahmed Abdul-Sattar	½–½	Gombosürengiin Mönkhgal
Dhamir Jabbar	1–0 WO	—
South Korea	2½–1½	Maldives
Kim Sae-byeok	1–0	Abdul Rahman Ali
Lee Ki-yul	½–½	Ahmed Fuad
Jung Min-woo	1–0	Ahmed Ashraf
Jang Jae-won	0–1	Mohamed Hassan
Yemen	3½–½	Jordan
Basheer Al-Qudaimi	1–0	Ahmad Al-Khatib
Hatim Al-Hadarani	1–0	Basel Al-Shoha
Mohammed Othman	1–0	Fadi Malkawi
Sabri Sallam	½–½	Mousa Hussain

==== Round 6 ====
	Score	
Kyrgyzstan	0–4	China
Algis Shukuraliev	0–1	Wang Hao
Nurdin Samakov	0–1	Bu Xiangzhi
Nasyr Akylbekov	0–1	Zhou Jianchao
Semetey Tologontegin	0–1	Ni Hua
Uzbekistan	½–½3	Philippines
Rustam Kasimdzhanov	½–½	Wesley So
Anton Filippov	0–1	Rogelio Antonio
Alexei Barsov	0–1	John Paul Gomez
Dzhurabek Khamrakulov	0–1	Eugene Torre
India	3½–½	Qatar
Pentala Harikrishna	1–0	Mohammed Al-Modiahki
Krishnan Sasikiran	1–0	Mohammed Al-Sayed
Surya Shekhar Ganguly	1–0	Husein Aziz Nezad
Geetha Narayanan Gopal	½–½	Hamad Al-Tamimi
Kazakhstan	2–2	Vietnam
Murtas Kazhgaleyev	1–0	Lê Quang Liêm
Rinat Jumabayev	½–½	Nguyễn Ngọc Trường Sơn
Yevgeniy Vladimirov	0–1	Cao Sang
Rustam Khusnutdinov	½–½	Nguyễn Đức Hòa
Iran	3½–½	Iraq
Ehsan Ghaemmaghami	1–0	Araz Bassim
Elshan Moradi	½–½	Hussein Ali
Morteza Mahjoub	1–0	Ahmed Abdul-Sattar
Asghar Golizadeh	1–0	Dhamir Jabbar
Mongolia	1½–2½	Bangladesh
Namkhain Battulga	½–½	Niaz Murshed
Bayarsaikhany Gündavaa	½–½	Minhazuddin Ahmed Sagar
Gombosürengiin Mönkhgal	½–½	Ziaur Rahman
—	0–1 WO	Mehdi Hasan Parag
Yemen	3½–½	South Korea
Basheer Al-Qudaimi	1–0	Lee Sang-hoon
Zendan Al-Zendani	1–0	Kim Sae-byeok
Hatim Al-Hadarani	1–0	Lee Ki-yul
Sabri Sallam	½–½	Jung Min-woo
Maldives	1–3	Jordan
Abdul Rahman Ali	0–1	Marwan Aboudi
Ahmed Fuad	1–0	Ahmad Al-Khatib
Ahmed Ashraf	0–1	Basel Al-Shoha
Mohamed Hassan	0–1	Mousa Hussain

==== Round 7 ====
	Score	
China	2½–1½	Kazakhstan
Wang Yue	½–½	Murtas Kazhgaleyev
Wang Hao	½–½	Rinat Jumabayev
Bu Xiangzhi	1–0	Yevgeniy Vladimirov
Zhou Jianchao	½–½	Rustam Khusnutdinov
Philippines	2½–1½	Kyrgyzstan
Wesley So	1–0	Algis Shukuraliev
John Paul Gomez	1–0	Nurdin Samakov
Darwin Laylo	0–1	Nasyr Akylbekov
Eugene Torre	½–½	Semetey Tologontegin
Iran	2–2	India
Ehsan Ghaemmaghami	½–½	Pentala Harikrishna
Elshan Moradi	0–1	Krishnan Sasikiran
Morteza Mahjoub	½–½	Surya Shekhar Ganguly
Asghar Golizadeh	1–0	Geetha Narayanan Gopal
Vietnam	3½–½	Yemen
Nguyễn Ngọc Trường Sơn	1–0	Basheer Al-Qudaimi
Cao Sang	1–0	Zendan Al-Zendani
Nguyễn Đức Hòa	1–0	Hatim Al-Hadarani
Nguyễn Huỳnh Minh Huy	½–½	Mohammed Othman
Bangladesh	1–3	Uzbekistan
Niaz Murshed	½–½	Rustam Kasimdzhanov
Minhazuddin Ahmed Sagar	0–1	Anton Filippov
Ziaur Rahman	½–½	Alexei Barsov
Abu Sufian Shakil	0–1	Dzhurabek Khamrakulov
Qatar	4–0	South Korea
Mohammed Al-Modiahki	1–0	Lee Sang-hoon
Mohammed Al-Sayed	1–0	Kim Sae-byeok
Husein Aziz Nezad	1–0	Lee Ki-yul
Hamad Al-Tamimi	1–0	Jung Min-woo
Jordan	1–3	Iraq
Marwan Aboudi	0–1	Araz Bassim
Ahmad Al-Khatib	0–1	Hussein Ali
Basel Al-Shoha	0–1	Ahmed Abdul-Sattar
Mousa Hussain	1–0	Dhamir Jabbar
Mongolia	2½–1½	Maldives
Namkhain Battulga	1–0	Abdul Rahman Ali
Bayarsaikhany Gündavaa	1–0	Ahmed Fuad
Gombosürengiin Mönkhgal	½–½	Ahmed Ashraf
—	0–1 WO	Mohamed Hassan

==== Summary ====
Rank	Team	Round							Total	GP	SB
Rank	Team	1	2	3	4	5	6	7	Total	GP	SB
1	China (CHN)	2	2	2	2	2	2	2	14	20	145½
2	Philippines (PHI)	2	0	2	2	2	2	2	12	18	118
3	India (IND)	2	2	2	0	0	2	1	9	18½	139½
4	Iran (IRI)	2	0	2	1	0	2	1	8	17	93
5	Qatar (QAT)	2	0	0	2	2	0	2	8	17	73½
6	Vietnam (VIE)	2	2	0	1	0	1	2	8	16½	101½
7	Uzbekistan (UZB)	2	0	2	1	1	0	2	8	13½	82
8	Kyrgyzstan (KGZ)	0	1	2	2	2	0	0	7	14½	78½
9	Iraq (IRQ)	0	0	1	2	2	0	2	7	14	63
10	Bangladesh (BAN)	0	2	0	2	0	2	0	6	15½	88
11	Kazakhstan (KAZ)	2	2	0	0	1	1	0	6	14	104½
12	Mongolia (MGL)	0	1	2	1	0	0	2	6	13	63½
13	Yemen (YEM)	0	2	0	0	2	2	0	6	12	46
14	South Korea (KOR)	0	2	0	0	2	0	0	4	6½	13½
15	Maldives (MDV)	0	1	2	0	0	0	0	3	9	43
16	Jordan (JOR)	0	0	0	1	0	2	0	3	9	32
17	Lebanon (LIB)	1	0	0	0				1	3	17

=== Knockout round ===
Semifinals
1	China	2½
4	Iran	1½
2	Philippines	2½
3	India	1½

Gold medal match
1	China	3½
2	Philippines	½
Bronze medal match
4	Iran	½
3	India	3½

==== Semifinals ====
	Score	
China	2½–1½	Iran
Wang Yue	½–½	Ehsan Ghaemmaghami
Wang Hao	1–0	Morteza Mahjoub
Bu Xiangzhi	½–½	Homayoun Tofighi
Zhou Jianchao	½–½	Asghar Golizadeh
India	1½–2½	Philippines
Pentala Harikrishna	1–0	Wesley So
Krishnan Sasikiran	0–1	Rogelio Antonio
Surya Shekhar Ganguly	½–½	John Paul Gomez
Geetha Narayanan Gopal	0–1	Eugene Torre

==== Bronze medal match ====
	Score	
Iran	½–3½	India
Ehsan Ghaemmaghami	½–½	Pentala Harikrishna
Elshan Moradi	0–1	Krishnan Sasikiran
Homayoun Tofighi	0–1	Surya Shekhar Ganguly
Asghar Golizadeh	0–1	Adhiban Baskaran

==== Gold medal match ====
	Score	
Philippines	½–3½	China
Wesley So	½–½	Wang Yue
John Paul Gomez	0–1	Wang Hao
Darwin Laylo	0–1	Zhou Jianchao
Eugene Torre	0–1	Ni Hua

== Non-participating athletes ==
- Taalaibek Imanaliev (KGZ)
