= Bangladeshi Chess Championship =

National Chess Championship of Bangladesh

The Bangladesh National Chess Championship is the annual individual national chess championship of Bangladesh.

== National Champions ==
=== Winners of championships by year ===
Year	Open Champion	Women's Champion
1974	Miah Abdus Salek	Not held
1975	Not held	Not held
1976	Mirza Akmal Hossain	Not held
1977	Mirza Akmal Hossain	Not held
1978	Rezaul Haque	Not held
1979	Niaz Murshed	Rani Hamid
1980	Niaz Murshed	Rani Hamid
1981	Niaz Murshed	Rani Hamid
1982	Niaz Murshed	Rani Hamid
1983	Jamilur Rahman	Rani Hamid
1984	Younus Hasan	Rani Hamid
1985	Sayed Ahmed Sohel	Yesmin Begum
1986	Zillur Rahman Champak	Yesmin Begum
1987	Zillur Rahman Champak	Not held
1988	Ziaur Rahman	Rani Hamid
1989	Rezaul Haque	Syeda Shabana Parveen Nipa
1990	Syed Tahmidur Rahman	Rani Hamid
1991	Reefat Bin-Sattar	Tanima Parveen
1992	Reefat Bin-Sattar	Rani Hamid
1993	Reefat Bin-Sattar	Zakia Sultana
1994	Ziaur Rahman	Tanima Parveen
1995	Reefat Bin-Sattar	Syeda Shabana Parveen Nipa
1996	Ziaur Rahman	Rani Hamid
1997	Enamul Hossain	Syeda Shabana Parveen Nipa
1998	Ziaur Rahman	Rani Hamid
1999	Ziaur Rahman	Rani Hamid
2000	Reefat Bin-Sattar	Nazrana Khan Eva
2001	Ziaur Rahman	Rani Hamid
2002	Ziaur Rahman	Syeda Shabana Parveen Nipa
2003	Reefat Bin-Sattar	Syeda Shabana Parveen Nipa
2004	Ziaur Rahman	Rani Hamid
2005	Ziaur Rahman	Shamima Akter Liza
2006	Enamul Hossain	Rani Hamid
2007	Abdullah Al Rakib	Rani Hamid
2008	Ziaur Rahman	Rani Hamid
2009	Ziaur Rahman	Sharmin Sultana Shirin
2010	Minhaz Uddin Ahmed	Shamima Akter Liza
2011	Ziaur Rahman	Rani Hamid
2012	Niaz Murshed	Sharmin Sultana Shirin
2013	Abdullah Al Rakib	Not held
2014	Ziaur Rahman	Shamima Akter Liza
2015	Minhaz Uddin Ahmed	Shamima Akter Liza
2016	Enamul Hossain	Nazrana Khan Eva
2017	Enamul Hossain	Sharmin Sultana Shirin
2018	Ziaur Rahman	Rani Hamid
2019	Niaz Murshed	Rani Hamid
2020		Not held
2021	Enamul Hossain	Ferdous Jannatul
2022		Anjum Noshin
2023	Not held	Not held
2024	Manon Reja Neer	Anjum Noshin
2025	Niaz Murshed	Anjum Noshin

=== Number of championship titles (Open) ===
#	Player	Roll of Honour	Years won
1	Ziaur Rahman	15	1988, 1994, 1996, 1998, 1999, 2001, 2002, 2004, 2005, 2008, 2009, 2011, 2014, 2018, 2019
2	Niaz Murshed	7	1979, 1980, 1981, 1982, 2012, 2019, 2025
3	Reefat Bin-Sattar	6	1991, 1992, 1993, 1995, 2000, 2003
4	Enamul Hossain	5	1997, 2006, 2016, 2017, 2021
5	Mirza Akmal Hossain	2	1975, 1976
5	Zillur Rahman Champak	2	1986, 1987
5	Rezaul Haque	2	1978, 1989
5	Abdullah Al Rakib	2	2007, 2013
5	Minhaz Uddin Ahmed	2	2010, 2015
10	Miah Abdus Salek	1	1974
10	Jamilur Rahman	1	1983
10	Younus Hasan	1	1984
10	Sayed Ahmed Sohel	1	1985
10	Syed Tahmidur Rahman	1	1990
10	Manon Reja Neer	1	2024

=== Number of championship titles (Women's) ===
#	Player	Roll of Honour	Years won
1	Rani Hamid	20	1979, 1980, 1981, 1982, 1983, 1984, 1988, 1990, 1992, 1996, 1998, 1999, 2001, 2004, 2006, 2007, 2008, 2011, 2018, 2019
2	Syeda Shabana Parveen Nipa	5	1989, 1995, 1997, 2002, 2003
3	Shamima Akter Liza	4	2005, 2010, 2014, 2015
4	Anjum Noshin	3	2022, 2024, 2025
5	Yesmin Begum	2	1985, 1986
5	Tanima Parveen	2	1991, 1994
5	Sharmin Sultana Shirin	2	2009, 2012
5	Nazrana Khan Eva	2	2000, 2016
9	Zakia Sultana	1	1993
9	Ferdous Jannatul	1	2021

== International Titles ==
As of August 2026:

=== Open titles ===
==== GM ====
1. Niaz Murshed (1987)
2. Ziaur Rahman (2002; inactive)
3. Reefat Bin-Sattar (2006; inactive)
4. Abdullah Al Rakib (2007; inactive)
5. Enamul Hossain (2008)

==== IM ====
1. Zillur Rahman Champak (1990; inactive)
2. Abu Sufian Shakil (2011)
3. Minhazuddin Ahmed Sagar (2012)
4. Mohammad Fahad Rahman (2019)
5. Manon Reja Neer (2024)

==== FM ====
1. Zia, Tahsin Tajwar
2. Subrota, Biswas
3. Nayem, Haque
4. Sakline Mostafa, Sajid
5. Islam, Khandaker Aminul
6. Chatterjee, Debaraj
7. Ahmed, Sheikh Nasir
8. Mehdi Hasan Parag
9. Md., Sharif Hossain
10. Rahman, Syed Mahfuzur
11. Mohammad, Javed
12. Mohammed Abdul, Malek
13. Uddin, Md. Saif
14. Syed Tahmidur Rahman (inactive)
15. Hasan, Eunus (inactive)
16. Rahman, Jamilur (inactive)

==== CM ====
1. Md. Sajidul, Haque
2. Md. Shawket Bin, Osman Shaon
3. Ahmed, Shafiq
4. Md. Abzid, Rahman
5. Md Abu Hanif
6. Md Sariat Ullah
7. Ghosh, Chanchal Kumer
8. Chowdhury, Sohel
9. Md. Masum, Hossain
10. Md. Jamal Uddin
11. Hossain, Monir
12. Md, Azmaeen Parvez Sayor
13. S M Sharon
14. Ahmed, Mahtabuddin
15. Tutul, Dhar
16. Avik, Sarker
17. Zoar Haque, Prodhan
18. Saiful Islam, Chowdhury (inactive)
19. Ikramul, Haq Siam (inactive)

=== Women's titles ===
As of August 2026:

==== WIM ====
1. Rani Hamid (1985)
2. Shamima Akter Liza (2011; inactive)
3. Sharmin Sultana Shirin (2019; inactive)
4. Wadifa Ahmed (2025)

==== WFM ====
1. Anjum Noshin (2019)
2. Ferdous Jannatul (2024)
3. Zakia Sultana (2024; inactive)
4. Warsia Khusbu (2025)
5. Khanam, Afroza (inactive)
6. Parveen, Seyda Shabana (inactive)
7. Parveen, Tanima
8. Khan, Nazrana

==== WCM ====
1. Nusrat Jahan, Alo
2. Ahmed, Walijah
3. Kazi Zarin, Tasnim
4. Sharmin, Samiha Shimmi
5. Neelava, Choudhury
6. Omnia Binta Yusuf, Lubaba
7. Israt, Jahan Diba
8. Warisa Haider
9. Chowdhury, Mahmuda Hoque (inactive)
10. Sabikun Nahar, Tonima (inactive)
