= Chess at the 2010 Asian Games – Men's individual rapid =

Asian Games Chess competition

Men's individual rapid at the 2010 Asian Games
- Venue: Guangzhou Chess Institute
- Date: 13–16 November 2010
- Competitors: 46 from 25 nations

Medalists
gold medal	Rustam Kasimdzhanov	Uzbekistan
silver medal	Lê Quang Liêm	Vietnam
bronze medal	Bu Xiangzhi	China

The men's individual rapid competition at the 2010 Asian Games in Guangzhou was held from 13 November to 16 November at the Guangzhou Chess Institute.

== Schedule ==
All times are China Standard Time (UTC+08:00)

Date	Time	Event
Saturday, 13 November 2010	15:00	Round 1
Saturday, 13 November 2010	16:30	Round 2
Sunday, 14 November 2010	15:00	Round 3
Sunday, 14 November 2010	16:30	Round 4
Monday, 15 November 2010	15:00	Round 5
Monday, 15 November 2010	16:30	Round 6
Monday, 15 November 2010	18:00	Round 7
Tuesday, 16 November 2010	15:00	Round 8
Tuesday, 16 November 2010	16:30	Round 9

== Results ==
Legend

- WO — Walkover

=== Round 1 ===
White	Score	Black
Zendan Al-Zendani (YEM)	0–1	Lê Quang Liêm (VIE)
Krishnan Sasikiran (IND)	1–0	Abdullah Hassan (UAE)
Mok Tze Meng (MAS)	0–1	Rustam Kasimdzhanov (UZB)
Bu Xiangzhi (CHN)	1–0	Algis Shukuraliev (KGZ)
Samir Mohammad (SYR)	1–0	Wesley So (PHI)
Surya Shekhar Ganguly (IND)	1–0	Minhazuddin Ahmed Sagar (BAN)
Araz Bassim (IRQ)	0–1	Ni Hua (CHN)
Nguyễn Ngọc Trường Sơn (VIE)	1–0	Semetey Tologontegin (KGZ)
Shinya Kojima (JPN)	0–1	Darmen Sadvakasov (KAZ)
Murtas Kazhgaleyev (KAZ)	1–0	Ahmed Abdul-Sattar (IRQ)
Namkhain Battulga (MGL)	0–1	Anton Filippov (UZB)
Ehsan Ghaemmaghami (IRI)	1–0	Bilam Lal Shrestha (NEP)
Lee Sang-hoon (KOR)	0–1	Elshan Moradi (IRI)
Rogelio Antonio (PHI)	1–0	Basel Al-Shoha (JOR)
Badrilal Nepali (NEP)	0–1	Mohammed Al-Modiahki (QAT)
Susanto Megaranto (INA)	1–0	Kohei Yamada (JPN)
Fadi Malkawi (JOR)	0–1	Salem Saleh (UAE)
Mohammed Al-Sayed (QAT)	1–0	Tarek Modallal (LIB)
Bayarsaikhany Gündavaa (MGL)	1–0	Abdul Rahman Ali (MDV)
Lee Ki-yul (KOR)	0–1	Niaz Murshed (BAN)
Mohamed Hassan (MDV)	0–1	Basheer Al-Qudaimi (YEM)
Hanjar Ödäýew (TKM)	1–0	Hani Mikati (LIB)
Khamphouth Phommasone (LAO)	0–1	Amanmyrat Kakageldiýew (TKM)

=== Round 2 ===
White	Score	Black
Lê Quang Liêm (VIE)	1–0	Rogelio Antonio (PHI)
Elshan Moradi (IRI)	½–½	Krishnan Sasikiran (IND)
Rustam Kasimdzhanov (UZB)	1–0	Susanto Megaranto (INA)
Mohammed Al-Modiahki (QAT)	½–½	Bu Xiangzhi (CHN)
Salem Saleh (UAE)	0–1	Surya Shekhar Ganguly (IND)
Ni Hua (CHN)	0–1	Mohammed Al-Sayed (QAT)
Niaz Murshed (BAN)	0–1	Nguyễn Ngọc Trường Sơn (VIE)
Darmen Sadvakasov (KAZ)	1–0	Bayarsaikhany Gündavaa (MGL)
Basheer Al-Qudaimi (YEM)	0–1	Murtas Kazhgaleyev (KAZ)
Anton Filippov (UZB)	1–0	Hanjar Ödäýew (TKM)
Amanmyrat Kakageldiýew (TKM)	½–½	Ehsan Ghaemmaghami (IRI)
Abdullah Hassan (UAE)	1–0	Samir Mohammad (SYR)
Wesley So (PHI)	1–0	Lee Sang-hoon (KOR)
Basel Al-Shoha (JOR)	0–1	Namkhain Battulga (MGL)
Kohei Yamada (JPN)	½–½	Zendan Al-Zendani (YEM)
Tarek Modallal (LIB)	0–1	Mok Tze Meng (MAS)
Algis Shukuraliev (KGZ)	½–½	Badrilal Nepali (NEP)
Minhazuddin Ahmed Sagar (BAN)	1–0	Fadi Malkawi (JOR)
Abdul Rahman Ali (MDV)	0–1	Araz Bassim (IRQ)
Semetey Tologontegin (KGZ)	1–0	Lee Ki-yul (KOR)
Hani Mikati (LIB)	0–1	Shinya Kojima (JPN)
Ahmed Abdul-Sattar (IRQ)	1–0	Mohamed Hassan (MDV)
Bilam Lal Shrestha (NEP)	1–0	Khamphouth Phommasone (LAO)

=== Round 3 ===
White	Score	Black
Murtas Kazhgaleyev (KAZ)	0–1	Lê Quang Liêm (VIE)
Mohammed Al-Sayed (QAT)	½–½	Rustam Kasimdzhanov (UZB)
Surya Shekhar Ganguly (IND)	1–0	Darmen Sadvakasov (KAZ)
Nguyễn Ngọc Trường Sơn (VIE)	½–½	Anton Filippov (UZB)
Krishnan Sasikiran (IND)	1–0	Mohammed Al-Modiahki (QAT)
Bu Xiangzhi (CHN)	1–0	Amanmyrat Kakageldiýew (TKM)
Ehsan Ghaemmaghami (IRI)	½–½	Elshan Moradi (IRI)
Hanjar Ödäýew (TKM)	0–1	Wesley So (PHI)
Mok Tze Meng (MAS)	0–1	Ni Hua (CHN)
Rogelio Antonio (PHI)	½–½	Abdullah Hassan (UAE)
Susanto Megaranto (INA)	1–0	Minhazuddin Ahmed Sagar (BAN)
Samir Mohammad (SYR)	0–1	Salem Saleh (UAE)
Bayarsaikhany Gündavaa (MGL)	1–0	Semetey Tologontegin (KGZ)
Araz Bassim (IRQ)	1–0	Niaz Murshed (BAN)
Namkhain Battulga (MGL)	1–0	Ahmed Abdul-Sattar (IRQ)
Shinya Kojima (JPN)	1–0	Basheer Al-Qudaimi (YEM)
Zendan Al-Zendani (YEM)	1–0	Bilam Lal Shrestha (NEP)
Badrilal Nepali (NEP)	1–0	Kohei Yamada (JPN)
Lee Sang-hoon (KOR)	1–0	Algis Shukuraliev (KGZ)
Mohamed Hassan (MDV)	0–1	Basel Al-Shoha (JOR)
Fadi Malkawi (JOR)	0–1	Abdul Rahman Ali (MDV)
Khamphouth Phommasone (LAO)	0–1	Tarek Modallal (LIB)
Lee Ki-yul (KOR)	1–0	Hani Mikati (LIB)

=== Round 4 ===
White	Score	Black
Lê Quang Liêm (VIE)	1–0	Surya Shekhar Ganguly (IND)
Anton Filippov (UZB)	½–½	Krishnan Sasikiran (IND)
Rustam Kasimdzhanov (UZB)	1–0	Nguyễn Ngọc Trường Sơn (VIE)
Mohammed Al-Sayed (QAT)	0–1	Bu Xiangzhi (CHN)
Wesley So (PHI)	1–0	Susanto Megaranto (INA)
Ni Hua (CHN)	½–½	Bayarsaikhany Gündavaa (MGL)
Darmen Sadvakasov (KAZ)	1–0	Namkhain Battulga (MGL)
Salem Saleh (UAE)	0–1	Murtas Kazhgaleyev (KAZ)
Araz Bassim (IRQ)	0–1	Ehsan Ghaemmaghami (IRI)
Elshan Moradi (IRI)	1–0	Shinya Kojima (JPN)
Amanmyrat Kakageldiýew (TKM)	0–1 WO	Rogelio Antonio (PHI)
Mohammed Al-Modiahki (QAT)	1–0	Zendan Al-Zendani (YEM)
Abdullah Hassan (UAE)	1–0	Badrilal Nepali (NEP)
Niaz Murshed (BAN)	1–0	Ahmed Abdul-Sattar (IRQ)
Basheer Al-Qudaimi (YEM)	0–1	Bilam Lal Shrestha (NEP)
Basel Al-Shoha (JOR)	1–0 WO	Hanjar Ödäýew (TKM)
Abdul Rahman Ali (MDV)	0–1	Mok Tze Meng (MAS)
Tarek Modallal (LIB)	0–1	Samir Mohammad (SYR)
Minhazuddin Ahmed Sagar (BAN)	1–0	Lee Ki-yul (KOR)
Semetey Tologontegin (KGZ)	½–½	Lee Sang-hoon (KOR)
Algis Shukuraliev (KGZ)	1–0	Kohei Yamada (JPN)
Hani Mikati (LIB)	½–½	Fadi Malkawi (JOR)
Khamphouth Phommasone (LAO)	0–1	Mohamed Hassan (MDV)

=== Round 5 ===
White	Score	Black
Bu Xiangzhi (CHN)	0–1	Lê Quang Liêm (VIE)
Krishnan Sasikiran (IND)	½–½	Rustam Kasimdzhanov (UZB)
Murtas Kazhgaleyev (KAZ)	½–½	Wesley So (PHI)
Surya Shekhar Ganguly (IND)	1–0	Anton Filippov (UZB)
Ehsan Ghaemmaghami (IRI)	0–1	Darmen Sadvakasov (KAZ)
Ni Hua (CHN)	1–0	Elshan Moradi (IRI)
Nguyễn Ngọc Trường Sơn (VIE)	1–0	Mohammed Al-Sayed (QAT)
Bayarsaikhany Gündavaa (MGL)	1–0	Rogelio Antonio (PHI)
Abdullah Hassan (UAE)	0–1	Mohammed Al-Modiahki (QAT)
Susanto Megaranto (INA)	1–0	Samir Mohammad (SYR)
Shinya Kojima (JPN)	0–1	Salem Saleh (UAE)
Bilam Lal Shrestha (NEP)	0–1	Niaz Murshed (BAN)
Namkhain Battulga (MGL)	1–0	Minhazuddin Ahmed Sagar (BAN)
Mok Tze Meng (MAS)	1–0	Araz Bassim (IRQ)
Basel Al-Shoha (JOR)	0–1	Amanmyrat Kakageldiýew (TKM)
Zendan Al-Zendani (YEM)	1–0	Algis Shukuraliev (KGZ)
Badrilal Nepali (NEP)	0–1	Semetey Tologontegin (KGZ)
Lee Sang-hoon (KOR)	0–1	Basheer Al-Qudaimi (YEM)
Lee Ki-yul (KOR)	0–1	Hanjar Ödäýew (TKM)
Ahmed Abdul-Sattar (IRQ)	1–0	Abdul Rahman Ali (MDV)
Mohamed Hassan (MDV)	1–0	Tarek Modallal (LIB)
Kohei Yamada (JPN)	1–0	Hani Mikati (LIB)
Fadi Malkawi (JOR)	1–0	Khamphouth Phommasone (LAO)

=== Round 6 ===
White	Score	Black
Lê Quang Liêm (VIE)	½–½	Darmen Sadvakasov (KAZ)
Rustam Kasimdzhanov (UZB)	1–0	Surya Shekhar Ganguly (IND)
Nguyễn Ngọc Trường Sơn (VIE)	0–1	Krishnan Sasikiran (IND)
Murtas Kazhgaleyev (KAZ)	0–1	Bu Xiangzhi (CHN)
Wesley So (PHI)	1–0	Bayarsaikhany Gündavaa (MGL)
Mohammed Al-Modiahki (QAT)	0–1	Ni Hua (CHN)
Anton Filippov (UZB)	1–0	Mok Tze Meng (MAS)
Salem Saleh (UAE)	0–1	Ehsan Ghaemmaghami (IRI)
Elshan Moradi (IRI)	1–0 WO	Namkhain Battulga (MGL)
Niaz Murshed (BAN)	0–1	Susanto Megaranto (INA)
Rogelio Antonio (PHI)	1–0	Zendan Al-Zendani (YEM)
Semetey Tologontegin (KGZ)	0–1	Mohammed Al-Sayed (QAT)
Amanmyrat Kakageldiýew (TKM)	0–1	Abdullah Hassan (UAE)
Basheer Al-Qudaimi (YEM)	1–0	Ahmed Abdul-Sattar (IRQ)
Hanjar Ödäýew (TKM)	1–0	Shinya Kojima (JPN)
Samir Mohammad (SYR)	½–½	Basel Al-Shoha (JOR)
Minhazuddin Ahmed Sagar (BAN)	1–0	Mohamed Hassan (MDV)
Bilam Lal Shrestha (NEP)	1–0	Araz Bassim (IRQ)
Algis Shukuraliev (KGZ)	1–0	Fadi Malkawi (JOR)
Kohei Yamada (JPN)	0–1	Lee Sang-hoon (KOR)
Tarek Modallal (LIB)	0–1	Badrilal Nepali (NEP)
Abdul Rahman Ali (MDV)	0–1	Lee Ki-yul (KOR)
Hani Mikati (LIB)	1–0	Khamphouth Phommasone (LAO)

=== Round 7 ===
White	Score	Black
Rustam Kasimdzhanov (UZB)	1–0	Lê Quang Liêm (VIE)
Krishnan Sasikiran (IND)	1–0	Wesley So (PHI)
Bu Xiangzhi (CHN)	1–0	Ni Hua (CHN)
Darmen Sadvakasov (KAZ)	0–1	Anton Filippov (UZB)
Elshan Moradi (IRI)	0–1	Surya Shekhar Ganguly (IND)
Ehsan Ghaemmaghami (IRI)	0–1	Susanto Megaranto (INA)
Bayarsaikhany Gündavaa (MGL)	0–1	Nguyễn Ngọc Trường Sơn (VIE)
Abdullah Hassan (UAE)	0–1	Murtas Kazhgaleyev (KAZ)
Mohammed Al-Sayed (QAT)	½–½	Rogelio Antonio (PHI)
Salem Saleh (UAE)	½–½	Mohammed Al-Modiahki (QAT)
Niaz Murshed (BAN)	0–1	Hanjar Ödäýew (TKM)
Mok Tze Meng (MAS)	0–1	Namkhain Battulga (MGL)
Minhazuddin Ahmed Sagar (BAN)	1–0	Basheer Al-Qudaimi (YEM)
Lee Sang-hoon (KOR)	0–1	Bilam Lal Shrestha (NEP)
Amanmyrat Kakageldiýew (TKM)	½–½	Semetey Tologontegin (KGZ)
Basel Al-Shoha (JOR)	0–1	Algis Shukuraliev (KGZ)
Badrilal Nepali (NEP)	0–1	Samir Mohammad (SYR)
Araz Bassim (IRQ)	0–1	Zendan Al-Zendani (YEM)
Shinya Kojima (JPN)	1–0	Mohamed Hassan (MDV)
Ahmed Abdul-Sattar (IRQ)	0–1	Lee Ki-yul (KOR)
Fadi Malkawi (JOR)	½–½	Kohei Yamada (JPN)
Tarek Modallal (LIB)	1–0	Hani Mikati (LIB)
Khamphouth Phommasone (LAO)	0–1	Abdul Rahman Ali (MDV)

=== Round 8 ===
White	Score	Black
Bu Xiangzhi (CHN)	0–1	Rustam Kasimdzhanov (UZB)
Lê Quang Liêm (VIE)	1–0	Krishnan Sasikiran (IND)
Susanto Megaranto (INA)	1–0	Anton Filippov (UZB)
Surya Shekhar Ganguly (IND)	1–0	Wesley So (PHI)
Ni Hua (CHN)	0–1	Murtas Kazhgaleyev (KAZ)
Darmen Sadvakasov (KAZ)	1–0	Nguyễn Ngọc Trường Sơn (VIE)
Namkhain Battulga (MGL)	1–0	Ehsan Ghaemmaghami (IRI)
Bilam Lal Shrestha (NEP)	0–1	Elshan Moradi (IRI)
Rogelio Antonio (PHI)	½–½	Minhazuddin Ahmed Sagar (BAN)
Mohammed Al-Modiahki (QAT)	½–½	Mohammed Al-Sayed (QAT)
Hanjar Ödäýew (TKM)	½–½	Bayarsaikhany Gündavaa (MGL)
Algis Shukuraliev (KGZ)	0–1	Salem Saleh (UAE)
Zendan Al-Zendani (YEM)	½–½	Abdullah Hassan (UAE)
Samir Mohammad (SYR)	0–1	Niaz Murshed (BAN)
Basheer Al-Qudaimi (YEM)	1–0	Mok Tze Meng (MAS)
Lee Ki-yul (KOR)	0–1	Amanmyrat Kakageldiýew (TKM)
Semetey Tologontegin (KGZ)	0–1	Shinya Kojima (JPN)
Badrilal Nepali (NEP)	1–0	Lee Sang-hoon (KOR)
Ahmed Abdul-Sattar (IRQ)	1–0	Basel Al-Shoha (JOR)
Kohei Yamada (JPN)	1–0	Tarek Modallal (LIB)
Mohamed Hassan (MDV)	0–1	Fadi Malkawi (JOR)
Abdul Rahman Ali (MDV)	0–1	Hani Mikati (LIB)
Khamphouth Phommasone (LAO)	0–1	Araz Bassim (IRQ)

=== Round 9 ===
White	Score	Black
Rustam Kasimdzhanov (UZB)	½–½	Darmen Sadvakasov (KAZ)
Susanto Megaranto (INA)	0–1	Lê Quang Liêm (VIE)
Murtas Kazhgaleyev (KAZ)	1–0	Surya Shekhar Ganguly (IND)
Krishnan Sasikiran (IND)	0–1	Bu Xiangzhi (CHN)
Elshan Moradi (IRI)	0–1	Namkhain Battulga (MGL)
Anton Filippov (UZB)	½–½	Wesley So (PHI)
Minhazuddin Ahmed Sagar (BAN)	½–½	Ni Hua (CHN)
Nguyễn Ngọc Trường Sơn (VIE)	1–0	Mohammed Al-Modiahki (QAT)
Salem Saleh (UAE)	0–1	Rogelio Antonio (PHI)
Mohammed Al-Sayed (QAT)	1–0	Hanjar Ödäýew (TKM)
Ehsan Ghaemmaghami (IRI)	1–0	Zendan Al-Zendani (YEM)
Bayarsaikhany Gündavaa (MGL)	1–0	Bilam Lal Shrestha (NEP)
Amanmyrat Kakageldiýew (TKM)	0–1	Niaz Murshed (BAN)
Abdullah Hassan (UAE)	½–½	Basheer Al-Qudaimi (YEM)
Shinya Kojima (JPN)	1–0	Badrilal Nepali (NEP)
Samir Mohammad (SYR)	1–0	Algis Shukuraliev (KGZ)
Mok Tze Meng (MAS)	0–1	Ahmed Abdul-Sattar (IRQ)
Araz Bassim (IRQ)	1–0	Kohei Yamada (JPN)
Fadi Malkawi (JOR)	0–1	Semetey Tologontegin (KGZ)
Basel Al-Shoha (JOR)	0–1	Lee Ki-yul (KOR)
Hani Mikati (LIB)	0–1	Mohamed Hassan (MDV)
Lee Sang-hoon (KOR)	1–0	Khamphouth Phommasone (LAO)
Tarek Modallal (LIB)	1–0	Abdul Rahman Ali (MDV)

=== Summary ===
Rank	Athlete	Rtg	Round									Total	HH	ARO
Rank	Athlete	Rtg	1	2	3	4	5	6	7	8	9	Total	HH	ARO
1st place, gold medalist(s)	Rustam Kasimdzhanov (UZB)	2685	1	1	½	1	½	1	1	1	½	7½	1	2623
2nd place, silver medalist(s)	Lê Quang Liêm (VIE)	2689	1	1	1	1	1	½	0	1	1	7½	0	2631
3rd place, bronze medalist(s)	Bu Xiangzhi (CHN)	2680	1	½	1	1	0	1	1	0	1	6½	1	2598
4	Murtas Kazhgaleyev (KAZ)	2623	1	1	0	1	½	0	1	1	1	6½	0	2580
5	Surya Shekhar Ganguly (IND)	2644	1	1	1	0	1	0	1	1	0	6		2626
6	Darmen Sadvakasov (KAZ)	2627	1	1	0	1	1	½	0	1	½	6		2595
7	Susanto Megaranto (INA)	2528	1	0	1	0	1	1	1	1	0	6		2550
8	Namkhain Battulga (MGL)	2428	0	1	1	0	1	0	1	1	1	6		2505
9	Krishnan Sasikiran (IND)	2688	1	½	1	½	½	1	1	0	0	5½		2639
10	Anton Filippov (UZB)	2620	1	1	½	½	0	1	1	0	½	5½		2577
11	Nguyễn Ngọc Trường Sơn (VIE)	2628	1	1	½	0	1	0	1	0	1	5½		2573
12	Mohammed Al-Sayed (QAT)	2502	1	1	½	0	0	1	½	½	1	5½		2562
13	Rogelio Antonio (PHI)	2573	1	0	½	1	0	1	½	½	1	5½		2466
14	Wesley So (PHI)	2669	0	1	1	1	½	1	0	0	½	5		2543
15	Ni Hua (CHN)	2633	1	0	1	½	1	1	0	0	½	5		2520
16	Bayarsaikhany Gündavaa (MGL)	2472	1	0	1	½	1	0	0	½	1	5		2500
17	Elshan Moradi (IRI)	2575	1	½	½	1	0	1	0	1	0	5		2485
18	Ehsan Ghaemmaghami (IRI)	2593	1	½	½	1	0	1	0	0	1	5		2478
19	Minhazuddin Ahmed Sagar (BAN)	2350	0	1	0	1	0	1	1	½	½	5		2406
20	Niaz Murshed (BAN)	2429	1	0	0	1	1	0	0	1	1	5		2390
21	Shinya Kojima (JPN)	2329	0	1	1	0	0	0	1	1	1	5		2343
22	Mohammed Al-Modiahki (QAT)	2562	1	½	0	1	1	0	½	½	0	4½		2556
23	Salem Saleh (UAE)	2518	1	0	1	0	1	0	½	1	0	4½		2508
24	Abdullah Hassan (UAE)	2398	0	1	½	1	0	1	0	½	½	4½		2501
25	Samir Mohammad (SYR)	2361	1	0	0	1	0	½	1	0	1	4½		2391
26	Hanjar Ödäýew (TKM)	2405	1	0	0	0	1	1	1	½	0	4½		2384
27	Basheer Al-Qudaimi (YEM)	2406	1	0	0	0	1	1	0	1	½	4½		2334
28	Zendan Al-Zendani (YEM)	2398	0	½	1	0	1	0	1	½	0	4		2460
29	Bilam Lal Shrestha (NEP)	2138	0	1	0	1	0	1	1	0	0	4		2419
30	Amanmyrat Kakageldiýew (TKM)	2400	1	½	0	0	1	0	½	1	0	4		2382
31	Semetey Tologontegin (KGZ)	2330	0	1	0	½	1	0	½	0	1	4		2332
32	Araz Bassim (IRQ)	2349	0	1	1	0	0	0	0	1	1	4		2327
33	Ahmed Abdul-Sattar (IRQ)	2309	0	1	0	0	1	0	0	1	1	4		2283
34	Lee Ki-yul (KOR)	1945	0	0	1	0	0	1	1	0	1	4		2283
35	Badrilal Nepali (NEP)	2102	0	½	1	0	0	1	0	1	0	3½	1½	2322
36	Lee Sang-hoon (KOR)	2132	0	0	1	½	0	1	0	0	1	3½	1	2336
37	Algis Shukuraliev (KGZ)	2376	0	½	0	1	0	1	1	0	0	3½	½	2299
38	Mok Tze Meng (MAS)	2394	0	1	0	1	1	0	0	0	0	3		2432
39	Kohei Yamada (JPN)	2091	0	½	0	0	1	0	½	1	0	3		2250
40	Mohamed Hassan (MDV)	1780	0	0	0	1	1	0	0	0	1	3		2102
41	Fadi Malkawi (JOR)	2089	0	0	0	½	1	0	½	1	0	3		2073
42	Tarek Modallal (LIB)	2028	0	0	1	0	0	0	1	0	1	3		2046
43	Basel Al-Shoha (JOR)	2106	0	0	1	1	0	½	0	0	0	2½		2350
44	Hani Mikati (LIB)	0	0	0	0	½	0	1	0	1	0	2½		2075
45	Abdul Rahman Ali (MDV)	1936	0	0	1	0	0	0	1	0	0	2		2098
46	Khamphouth Phommasone (LAO)	0	0	0	0	0	0	0	0	0	0	0		2107
