= Syed Sujauddin Ahmed =

Bangladeshi Army officer and civil servant

Captain Syed Sujauddin Ahmed is a retired Bangladesh Army officer, civil servant, and former secretary of the Ministry of Youth and Sports. He was the general secretary and later president of Bangladesh Chess Federation. He was the chairman of the Bangladesh Tariff Commission. He was the Secretary of the Ministry of Labour and Employment.

== Career ==
In July 2004, Ahmed was appointed acting secretary of the Ministry of Youth and Sports. He was previously an officer-on-special-duty at the Ministry of Establishment.

Ahmed said he would stand for re-election as general secretary of the Bangladesh Chess Federation in March 2005. He had served as the secretary from 1998 to 2005. In September 2005, he was appointed chairman of the Bangladesh Tariff Commission on a one-year contract after his retirement.

In 2006, Ahmed was appointed acting Secretary of the Ministry of Labour and Employment. In January 2006, he was appointed president of the Bangladesh Chess Federation replacing Akhter Hossain Khan, secretary of the Ministry of Planning. In March 2009, he received a special award for his contribution to sports in Bangladesh from the Bangladesh Sports Journalists' Association.

Ahmed was part of a seven-member delegation of the Bangladesh Nationalist Party that met with Chief Election Commissioner Kazi Rakibuddin Ahmad and demanded the deployment of Bangladesh Army before mayoral elections in Chittagong and Dhaka in 2015.

In November 2023, Ahmed signed a letter along with 140 other retired government officers calling for the cancellation of the 2024 general election and asked the Awami League government to engage in discussion with the opposition parties. He is a member of the advisory council of the chairperson of Bangladesh Nationalist Party Khaleda Zia.

Ahmed is the president of Bangladesh Chess Federation. He attended the Mian Sultan Khan Chess Tournament at the Pakistan High Commission along with Mustafa Sarwar Farooqui, Niaz Murshed, and Rani Hamid in February 2025. He met with former Prime Minister Khaleda Zia along with a delegation of the Bangladesh Nationalist Party in June 2024.
