= Syeda Shabana Parveen Nipa =

Bangladeshi chess player (born 1969)

Personal information
- Born: 1969 (age 56–57)

Chess career
- Country: Bangladesh
- Title: Woman FIDE Master (1998)
- FIDE rating: 2048 (June 2019)
- Peak rating: 2140 (July 2003)

Seyda Shabana Parveen Nipa (born 1969) is a Bangladeshi chess player who holds the Woman FIDE Master (WFM) title.

She has won the Women's title in the Bangladeshi Chess Championship five times: 1989, 1995, 1997, 2002, and 2003. This is the second highest number of titles behind Rani Hamid's 19 championships.

== See also ==
- Bangladesh Chess Federation
