= Zillur Rahman (disambiguation) =

Zillur Rahman (1929–2013) was the president of Bangladesh.

Zillur Rahman may also refer to:

- Zillur Rahman (Kushtia politician), Bangladesh Nationalist Party politician and member of parliament for Kushtia
- Zillur Rahman (professor), Indian professor of management studies
- Zillur Rahman (journalist), Bangladeshi journalist
- Zillur Rahman Champak (born 1967), Bangladeshi chess player
- Mohammad Zillur Rahman, Bangladeshi politician, member of parliament for Moulvibazar-3 constituency
- Zillur Rahman (police), Bangladeshi police officer

== See also ==
- Zillur Rahman Siddiqui (1928–2014), Bangladeshi writer, academic and educationist
