= Manon Reja Neer =

Bangladeshi chess player (born 2010)

Personal information
- Born: 18 June 2010 (age 16)

Chess career
- Country: Bangladesh
- Title: International Master (2024)
- FIDE rating: 2408 (August 2026)
- Peak rating: 2445 (June 2024)

Manon Reja Neer (born 18 June 2010) is a Bangladeshi chess player. In October 2024, he became the youngest Bangladeshi International Master (IM) at the age of 14 years, 3 months and 16 days. He was the champion in the 48th National Chess Championship held in July 2024 winning with 10 points in 13 games.

== Career ==
Neer earned his Candidate Master (CM) title in 2017.

By 2019, Neer won four gold and one silver medal from the Commonwealth Junior Championship in New Delhi, Asian Youth Championship in Colombo and Western-Asian Youth Championship in Tashkent.

In October 2019, Neer became the youngest Bangladeshi player, at the age of nine, to earn a spot in the Bangladeshi National Chess Championship (NCC). The previous record was held by Grandmaster Niaz Murshed who reached the championships at the age of 10. He achieved his FIDE Master (FM) in 2023.

Neer became the youngest Bangladeshi chess player to become International Master (IM) after earning his third IM norm beating IM Sambit Panda of India at the Six Days Budapest Two Years 2024 Grand Masters, International Masters and Below 2250 Rating event in Budapest, Hungary. The previous record was held by Grandmaster Niaz Murshed at the age of 15 years and 5 months.

After winning Zonal Chess Championship (Zone 3.2) title in Colombo, Sri Lanka in March 2025, Neer qualified to play at the Chess World Cup 2025. But he lost to Pranav V in the first round. He later won the MTB International Masters Chess Tournament, held at Independent University, Bangladesh in December 2025.

In February 2026, Neer won the Spectrum Bangladesh National Cup Chess 2026 title, sponsored by Spectrum Engineering Consortium Limited and organised by the Bangladesh Chess Federation. He played for Bangladesh Navy.

Neer won Vezerkepzo Summer 2026 Grandmaster Chess Tournament and stood fifth at the Farago Ivan Memorial 2026 Grandmasters Chess Tournament held in Budapest in July 2026.
