= Thies Heinemann =

German chess grandmaster (born 1971)

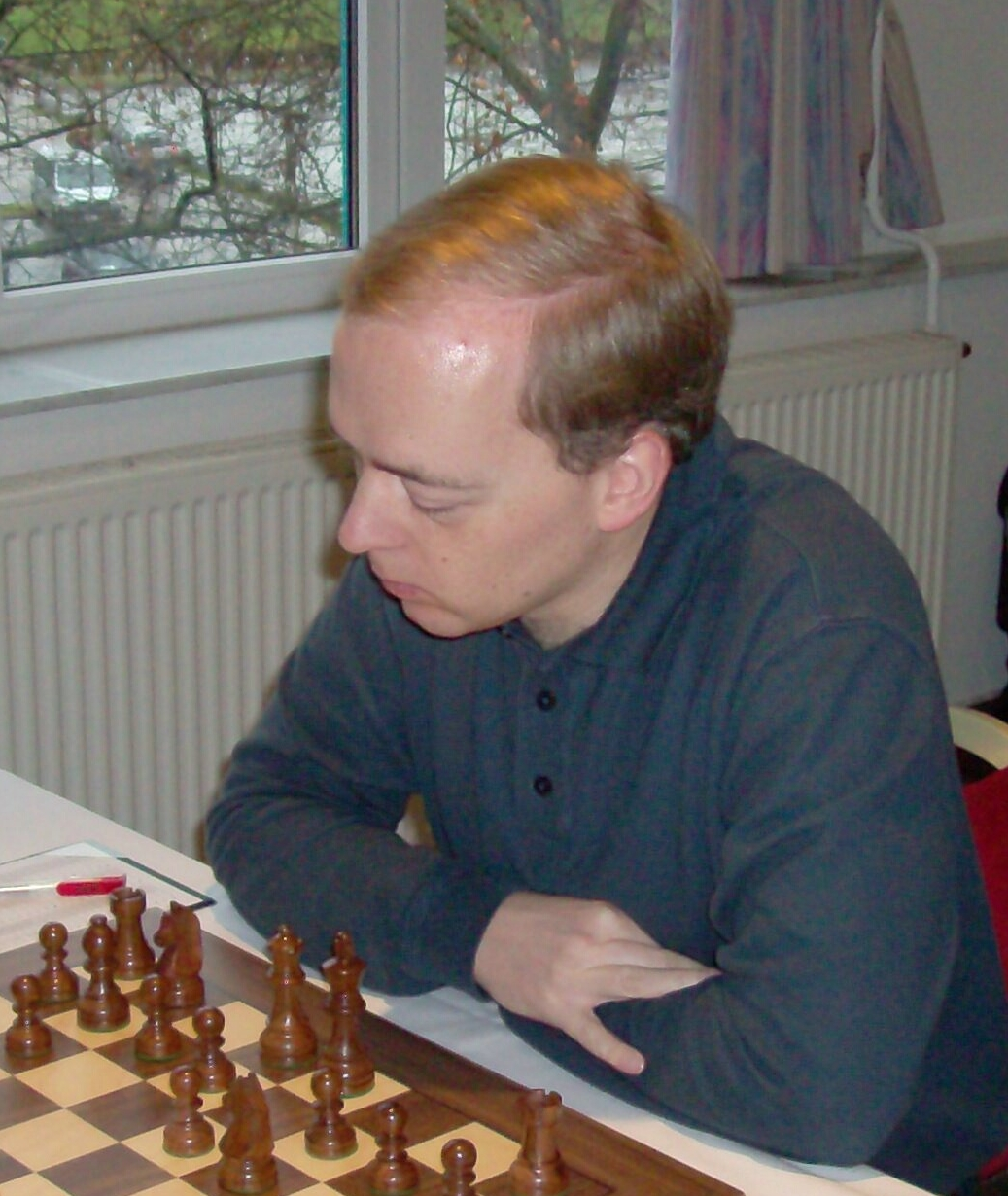

Personal information
- Born: Thies Heinemann; March 7, 1971 (age 55) Hamburg, West Germany

Chess career
- Title: Grandmaster (2018)
- Peak rating: 2521 (November 2018)

Thies Heinemann (born 7 March 1971) is a German chess Grandmaster (GM) and professional mathematician. A lifelong competitor in the Schachbundesliga (German Chess Bundesliga), he earned the Grandmaster title later in his career in 2018 while balancing his competitive play with his professional career outside the sport.

== Early life and education ==
Heinemann was born in Hamburg and began his competitive chess career with the regional club SG Glückstadt. He established himself as one of the top youth players in Northern Germany during the late 1980s, representing SV Bad Schwartau in the 2. Bundesliga during the 1988–89 season.

Outside of chess, Heinemann pursued academic studies in mathematics, subsequently entering the professional sector as a corporate mathematician.

== Chess career ==
In 1989, Heinemann joined the prestigious Hamburger SK (Hamburg Chess Club), a team he has continuously represented in the first division of the Schachbundesliga for several decades.

He was officially awarded the International Master (IM) title by FIDE in 1997. Heinemann achieved considerable domestic success in individual events, winning the German Blitz Championship in 1997 and claiming the Dähne-Pokal (the German National Cup) in 2003. He qualified for the German Individual Chess Championship four times, securing his best placement in 2004 when he finished in third place in Höckendorf.

Because of his professional career commitments, Heinemann rarely plays in standard open international tournaments, instead relying almost entirely on team league matches to maintain his competitive edge. Over several decades in the Bundesliga, he has secured individual match wins against prominent elite grandmasters, including former FIDE World Champion Rustam Kasimdzhanov.

After fulfilling the required Elo threshold and securing three grandmaster norms exclusively within domestic and team leagues, FIDE officially ratified his Grandmaster title in 2018 at the age of 47. He achieved his career-peak Elo rating of 2521 in November 2018.
