= Tahmidur Rahman =

Bangladeshi chess player (born 1963)

Personal information
- Born: 7 November 1963 (age 62)

Chess career
- Country: Bangladesh
- Title: FIDE Master (1987)
- FIDE rating: 2188 (November 2021)
- Peak rating: 2325 (July 1986)

Tahmidur Rahman (Bengali: তাহমিদুর রহমান; born 7 November 1963) is a Bangladeshi chess FIDE Master, Bangladeshi Chess Championship winner (1990), Chess Olympiad individual gold medalist (1988).

== Biography ==
From the mid-1980s to the mid-1990s, Tahmidur Rahman was one of Bangladesh's leading chess players. In 1990, he won Bangladeshi Chess Championship.

Tahmidur Rahman played for Bangladesh in the Chess Olympiads:

- In 1986, at fourth board in the 27th Chess Olympiad in Dubai (+6, =3, -3),
- In 1988, at second reserve board in the 28th Chess Olympiad in Thessaloniki (+5, =2, -0) and won individual gold medal,
- In 1990, at third board in the 29th Chess Olympiad in Novi Sad (+5, =2, -5),
- In 1992, at fourth board in the 30th Chess Olympiad in Manila (+4, =4, -1),
- In 1994, at first reserve board in the 31st Chess Olympiad in Moscow (+2, =0, -5).

Tahmidur Rahman played for Bangladesh in the Men's Asian Team Chess Championships:

- In 1987, at second board in the 7th Asian Team Chess Championship in Singapore (+1, =2, -4).

Since the early 2000s, he rarely participated in chess tournaments.
