= Ziaur Rahman (chess player) =

Bangladeshi chess grandmaster (1974–2024)

Ziaur Rahman জিয়াউর রহমান
Personal information
- Born: 1 May 1974
- Died: 5 July 2024 (aged 50) Shahbag, Bangladesh

Chess career
- Country: Bangladesh
- Title: Grandmaster (2002)
- Peak rating: 2570 (October 2005)

Ziaur Rahman (1 May 1974 – 5 July 2024) was a Bangladeshi chess grandmaster. He was the second Bangladeshi to earn the Grandmaster title in 2002. His 2570 FIDE rating in October 2005 is still the highest ever achieved by a Bangladeshi chess player.

== Early life and career ==
Rahman passed his SSC from St. Joseph Higher Secondary School, Dhaka. He then graduated from the University of Dhaka in anthropology.

Rahman earned the International Master (IM) title in 1993. He was the second Bangladeshi to obtain the Grandmaster (GM) title in 2002 after Niaz Murshed in 1993. In 2021, he won the Mujib Borsho Invitational in Dhaka with a score of 7.5/9 His playing style was solid positional.

== Personal life ==
Rahman was married to Labanya. In 2022, Rahman represented Bangladesh in the 44th Chess Olympiad with his son, Tahsin Tajwar Zia, also a chess player. They were the first father-son duo to be on a national chess team.

=== Death ===
On 5 July 2024, Rahman fell to the ground during his 12th round match of the Bangladesh Chess Federation National Chess Tournament against Enamul Hossain Rajib. He was then taken to Ibrahim Cardiac Hospital in Shahbag, where it was declared that he had died of a heart attack. It was later corrected that he died due to a stroke. He was 50 when he died.
