= Minhazuddin Ahmed Sagar =

Bangladeshi chess player (born 1988)

Personal information
- Born: 1988 (age 37–38)

Chess career
- Country: Bangladesh
- Title: International Master (2012)
- Peak rating: 2443 (March 2015)

Minhazuddin Ahmed Sagar (born 1988) is a Bangladeshi chess International Master.

== Career ==
On 31 July 2004, Sagar represented his school, Shah Ali School, in the Standard Chartered School Chess Tournament and came second.

In July 2005, Sagar came second in the University of Greenwich FIDE Rating Chess tournament. In October, he shared the top spot at the Prime Bank 8th Rating Chess Tournament with Syed Mahfuzur Rahman Emon, and Debaraj Chatterjee.

Sagar came second in The Telegraph Schools’ Chess Championship in August 2004.

In March, Sagar participated in the 33rd National Chess Championship qualifiers. In September 2007, Sagar participated in the Pragati Insurance Open International Rating Chess tournament. He placed second in the October 2007 Open International Rating Chess Tournament. On 19 September 2007, Sagar took the lead at the Destiny 2000 3rd Open FIDE Rating chess tournament.

Sagar earned the FIDE Master title in 2007 and International Master title in 2012.

In April 2008, he participated in the 34th National Chess Championship. He competed in the 3rd Kolkata Open Grandmasters Chess tournament. In August 2008, Sagar participated in the 8th United Insurance & United Leasing International Masters Chess. In November 2008, he participated in the 38th Chess Olympiad in Dresden, Germany. He won the Asian Junior Chess Championship in Chennai, India in December.

In February 2009, Sagar lead the BASIC Bank 30th National Junior Chess Championships. In June 2009, Sagar came third in the first SCS International Open Grandmasters Chess Tournament held in Orissa, India after drawing with GM Meelotpal Das. In August 2009, Sagar participated in the 9th United Insurance & United Leasing Grandmasters Chess tournament but lost to Shrestha Keshav. He lost another round to Nepali Badrilal. In September, he competed in the fourth Kolkata Open International Grandmasters Chess Tournament.

Sagar has won the Mercantile Bank 36th National Championship in 2010 at the Bangladesh Chess Federation after beating Debaraj Chatterjee. In March, he participated in the Six Seasons Grandmasters Chess Tournament at Uttara Club. In May, he participated in the Commonwealth Chess Championship held in New Delhi. In June, he participated in the 36th National Chess Championship preliminary work. In November, he participated in the 39th World Chess Olympiad in Khanty-Mansiysk. In November, he participated in the Berger Six Seasons Grandmasters Chess Tournament at Uttara Club. In December, he won the 8th Amritolal Dey International Rating Chess tournament after securing the lead.

In 2011, Sagar was part of Destiny 2000's team in the Premier Division Chess League.

In May, Sagar competed in the Commonwealth Chess Championship in New Delhi. Sagar participated in the 38th Access Group National Chess B Championship at the Bangladesh Chess Federation in September 2012. He finished 26th at the NIT Grandmasters Chess Tournament in October 2012. He competed in the Healthcare Pharmaceuticals Ltd 38th National A Chess Championship in November 2012 at the Bangladesh Olympic Association. Sagar shared second place at the Shaheed Muktijoddha Mufti Mohammad Kased International Rating Chess Tournament with Ziaur Rahman and FM Nasir Ahmed in December 2012. He was included in the national team created by Bangladesh Chess Federation. He was in the top five performing chess player in 2012.

In July 2013, Sagar placed 18th in the 4th Asian Indoor & Martial Arts Games. He shared second position at the Berger Paints 39th National 'A' Chess Championship with Enamul Hossain Razib. He was second in the Berger Paints 39th National 'A' Chess Championship in October 2013.

In August 2014, Sagar competed in the 41st World Chess Olympiad in Tromso, Norway.

Sagar was the best Bangladeshi player in the 2015 Commonwealth Chess Championship in New Delhi.

Sagar competed in the 46th National Premier Chess Championship in January 2022.
