= Noshin Anjum =

Bangladeshi chess player (born 2004)

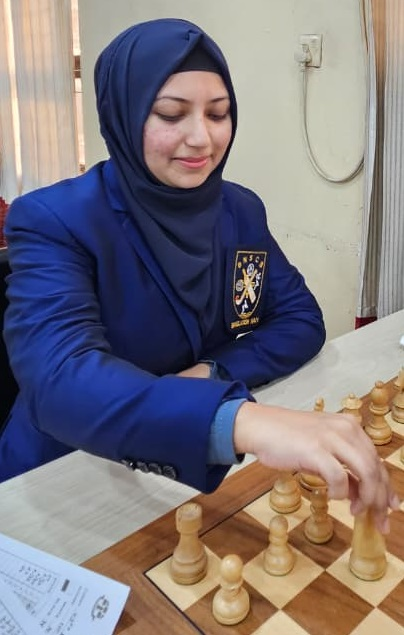
- Anjum in 2025

Personal information
- Native name: নোশিন আঞ্জুম
- Born: 2004 (age 21–22)
- Education: Viqarunnisa Noon School and College

Chess career
- Country: Bangladesh
- Title: Woman FIDE Master (2019)
- Peak rating: 2123 (April 2022)

Noshin Anjum (born 2004) is a Bangladeshi chess player who earned the title of Woman FIDE Master (WFM) in 2019. She won her third consecutive national title at the 43rd Bangladeshi Women's Chess Championship in October 2025.

== Background ==
Noshin Anjum was a student at the Elegant International Chess Academy. Competing against 80 boys and two girls, she finished second in the 2022 National Junior Chess Championship. She was a student at Viqarunnisa Noon School and College. As of November 2025, she has been a student at the Department of Food and Nutrition in the University of Dhaka.

== Career ==
In 2019, Anjum won Bangladeshi Youth Chess Championship in girl's U20 age group. She was then awarded the Woman FIDE Master title.

In 2022, Anjum played for Bangladesh at second board in the 44th Chess Olympiad (women) in Chennai (+7, =1, -4).

In 2023, Anjum participated in single-elimination Women's Chess World Cup in Baku and lost in 1st round to Polish Woman Grandmaster Monika Soćko. In 2023, she ranked in 2nd place in Asian Zonal Chess tournament.

In 2025, playing for Bangladesh Navy, Anjum won her third consecutive national title at the 43rd Bangladeshi Women's Chess Championship. She claimed 8.5 points from 11 games.

By November 2025, Anjum earned two WIM norms.
