= Nguyễn Huỳnh Minh Huy =

Vietnamese chess grandmaster (born 1987)

Personal information
- Born: October 11, 1987 (age 38) Đồng Tháp, Vietnam

Chess career
- Country: Vietnam
- Title: Grandmaster (2014)
- Peak rating: 2515 (September 2014)

Nguyễn Huỳnh Minh Huy is a Vietnamese chess grandmaster.

== Chess career ==
In November 2010, he played for Vietnam in the men’s team chess event at the 2010 Asian Games.

In 2014, he played for Vietnam in the Asian Team Chess Championship, where the team won the bronze medal.

In July 2014, he won the Borlóy-Androvitzky Károly Memorial Chess Tournament with an undefeated score and with a one-point margin over runner-up Nikita Petrov. With this win, he fulfilled all of the requirements for the Grandmaster title and became Vietnam’s 8th Grandmaster.

He achieved the Grandmaster title in 2014, earning his norms at the:

- First Saturday GM in February 2013
- JAPFA Grandmaster Tournament in April 2014
- Borloy-Androvitzky Karoly Memorial in July 2014
