= M. A. Hamid (officer) =

Bangladeshi sports organiser and Army lieutenant colonel

M A Hamid
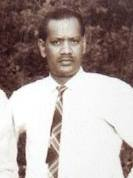
- Hamid in 1960
- Born: 15 March 1932; Sunamganj, Assam, British India
- Died: 25 July 2008 (aged 76); Dhaka, Bangladesh
- Spouse: Rani Hamid
- Children: Kaiser Hamid
- Military career
- Allegiance: Pakistan (Before 1972); Bangladesh
- Branch: Pakistan Army; Bangladesh Army; East Pakistan Rifles
- Service years: 1955-1975
- Rank: Lieutenant colonel
- Units: Punjab Regiment; East Bengal Regiment
- Commands: Station Commander, Dhaka; Military Secretary at Army Headquarters; CO of SSD Jessore
- Awards: National Sports Award

MA Hamid (15 March 1932 – 25 July 2008) was a Bangladeshi sports organiser and a Bangladesh Army lieutenant colonel. He was the founder of the Bangladesh Handball Federation, the president of the Army Sports Control Board, and the vice chairman of the National Sports Council. He was the recipient of a Bangladesh National Sports Award (2006) in the organiser category.

== Military career ==
=== Pakistan Army ===
Hamid joined the Pakistan Military Academy, Kakul, in 1953 as a cadet and was commissioned from the 12th PMA Long Course as a second lieutenant on 18 September 1955. He got a commission in the 5/14th Punjab Regiment, which was stationed in Landi Kotal at that time. At the time of his joining, the Afghanistan–Pakistan border conflict was going on, and he took part in that on the very first day of his Army career. Later his unit was sent to Jessore Cantonment. In 1958, Capt. Hamid, along with his unit, was sent to the Sundarbans for jungle warfare training. He was sent to Khulna for martial law duty in 1959. Later in 1963, he joined the 3rd East Bengal Regiment. In 1965, he was sent to the East Pakistan Rifles on deputation. He was posted to the 10th Wing of East Pakistan Rifles at Rangpur as an assistant commander. In early 1966 he was transferred to the 9th Wing as its commander at Thakurgaon. But after 6 months of his posting at Thakurgaon, he was nominated for staff course at Command and Staff College Quetta. In 1967 he served in Karachi as a staff officer in Divisional Headquarters. During the liberation war of Bangladesh, he was posted in Peshawar in the 6th East Bengal Regiment as a second in command. After the independence of Bangladesh, he and his family were shifted to a POW camp in Peshawar with other Bengali officers and their families. On 1 September 1972, they escaped to Afghanistan and contacted the Embassy of India, Kabul, and from there, they went first to New Delhi. After staying in New Delhi for two days, they went to Kolkata by train, and finally they arrived in Bangladesh on 22 September 1972.

=== Bangladesh Army ===
Following his return to Bangladesh, he joined the Bangladesh Army as military secretary at Army Headquarters. Later in 1975, Hamid served as the station commander of Dhaka Cantonment. He retired early from service in late 1975.

== Books ==
Hamid wrote four books:

- Three Army Coups and Some Untold Tales
- ফেলে আসা সৈনিক জীবন
- একাত্তরের যুদ্ধে জয় পরাজয় মুক্তিযুদ্ধকালে পশ্চিম পাকিস্তানের দৃশ্যপট
- পাকিস্তান থেকে পলায়ন

== Later career ==
He served as the president of the Bangladesh Handball Federation from 1984 to 2008. He was awarded a National Sports Award.

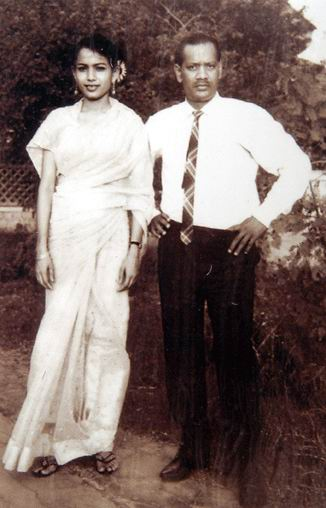
Rani Hamid and MA Hamid after their wedding in 1959

== Personal life ==
Hamid's wife, Rani Hamid, is a Woman International Master chess player. Their eldest son, Kaiser Hamid, was the captain of the Bangladesh national football team for several years; the second son, Sohel Hamid, was a national squash champion; and the youngest son, Bobby Hamid, was a football player. His only daughter Jabin Hamid also a sports enthusiastic

== Awards and decorations ==

| Sitara-e-Harb 1965 War (War Star 1965) | Tamgha-e-Jang 1965 War (War Medal 1965) | Tamgha-e-Jamhuria (Republic Commemoration Medal) 1956 |

== Death ==
He died on 25 July 2008 at the CMH after suffering from liver cirrhosis.
