= Abdullah Al Rakib =

Bangladeshi chess grandmaster (born 1980)

Abdullah Al-Rakib
Personal information
- Born: 2 December 1980 (age 45) Narayanganj, Bangladesh

Chess career
- Country: Bangladesh
- Title: Grandmaster (2007)
- FIDE rating: 2409 (July 2026)
- Peak rating: 2535 (January 2009)

Abdullah Al-Rakib (Bengali: আবদুল্লাহ আল রাকিব; born 2 December 1980) is a Bangladeshi chess player who holds the FIDE title of Grandmaster. He won the Bangladeshi Chess Championship in 2013.

== Career ==
On 25 September 2007, he became the 4th GM of Bangladesh. Rakib should have had his recognition after April at the Board meeting of FIDE. According to Bangladesh Chess Federation, it was a misunderstanding that caused the delay. However, the recognition came in the Presidential Board meeting of FIDE held in 13–14 September in Mexico. Rakib said, "Being Grandmaster is a particular recognition. It does not mean my game restricts here. I know very well about my weaknesses. I have to fix them". Rakib had his first norm in 2001 at Kolkata in "Asian International Chess Competition" and the second one at the "Grandmasters Tournament" of Leonine Chess Club. He achieved his last required norm in April 2007 at the National Championship.

His best results are: 1st at Dhaka 2004; 1st at Destiny Open, Bangladesh 2004; 1st Dhaka 2005; 1st at Mercantile Bank, Bangladesh 2007.

He has represented Bangladesh in seven Chess Olympiads.
