= Ferdous Jannatul =

Bangladeshi chess player (born 2005)

Personal information
- Born: 13 July 2005 (age 20) Dhaka, Bangladesh

Chess career
- Country: Bangladesh
- Title: Woman FIDE Master (2024)
- Peak rating: 1990 (April 2024)

Ferdous Jannatul (Bengali: ফেরদৌস জান্নাতুল; born in 2005) is a Bangladeshi chess Women FIDE Master (WFM) (2024), Bangladeshi Women's Chess Championship winner (2021), Asian Zone-3.2 Women's Chess Championship winner (2023).

== Chess career ==
In 2019 Jannatul won the Bangladeshi Youth Chess Championship in girl's U14 age group. In 2020 she won Bangladeshi Youth Chess Championship in open U16 age group.

In 2023 Jannatul won the Asian Zonal Chess tournament and achieved Women International Master (WIM) and also won the right to participate in the Women's Chess World Cup.

In 2023, in Baku Jannatul participated in single-elimination Women's Chess World Cup, losing in the first round to Romanian Woman Grandmaster Irina Bulmaga.

Jannatul played for Bangladesh in the Women's Chess Olympiads:

- In 2022, at third board in the 44th Chess Olympiad (women) in Chennai (+5, =3, -2).
- In 2019, she was awarded the Woman Candidate Master (WCM) title.
- In 2024, she was awarded the Woman FIDE Master (WFM) title.

== Historical achievements ==
Jannatul became the 2021 Bangladeshi Women's National Champion. She is the second youngest Women's National Champion among Bangladeshi Women. She became the Women's National Champion at the age of 16 years and 6 months. Before that in 2005, Shamima Akter Liza became the youngest female Women's National Champion at the age of 16.

Jannatul became the youngest Women International Master (WIM) title achieve among Bangladeshi Women's chess players. She made this record at the age of 18. She won the Woman International Master (WIM) title directly by becoming the Asian Zonal Champion 2023.

== Playing style ==
Jannatul prefers playing 1.d4 (the Queen's Pawn Game) with the white pieces. Also she played 1.e4 (the King's Pawn Game) with the white pieces.

== Personal life ==
In 2023, Jannatul Complete her HSC from Motijheel Model High School and College (MMSC) in Science Group. In July 2024, Jannatul was admitted to Dhaka University under the player quota in statistics subject.

Jannatul's Sibling Md. Sajidul Haque is also chess player. He is (Under-14 & 16) Bangladesh Champion-2022 & 2025. His current rating is 2036. In her personal life, Jannatul loves to travel a lot.
