= John Paul Gomez =

Filipino chess grandmaster (born 1986)

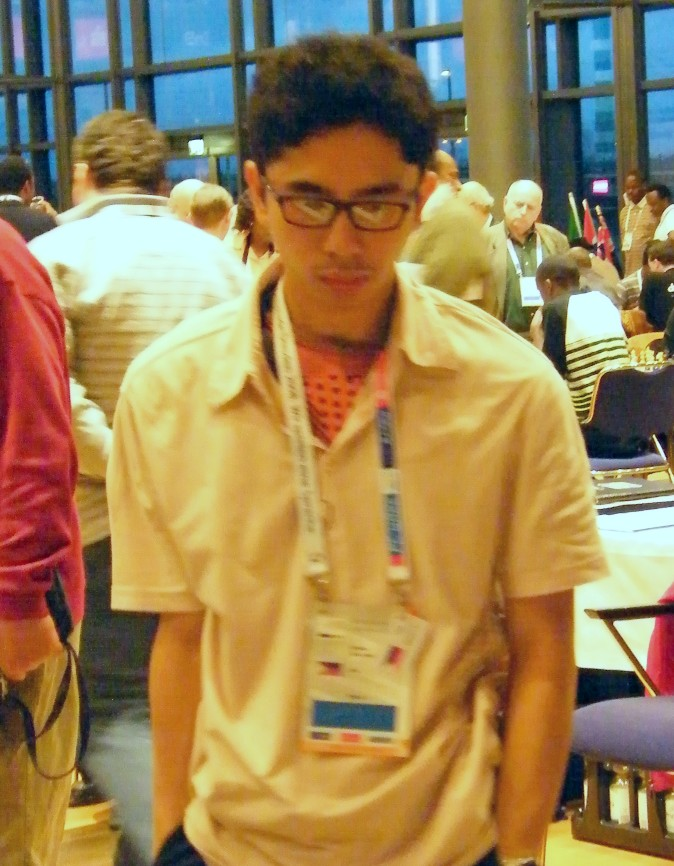
- Gomez at the 38th Chess Olympiad in Dresden, Germany

Personal information
- Born: May 23, 1986 (age 40) Biñan, Laguna Province, Philippines

Chess career
- Country: Philippines
- Title: Grandmaster (2009)
- Peak rating: 2541 (November 2013)

John Paul Gomez (born May 23, 1986) is a Filipino chess player. He was awarded the title of International Master (IM) in 2007 and International Grandmaster (GM) in 2009. He is a three-time Filipino national junior champion and has also won the Filipino Chess Championship.

== Early life and education ==
Gomez is from Biñan, Laguna Province in the Philippines. He began playing chess when he was three years old and began beating older players when he was five. After becoming bored with chess, he started playing tennis, even becoming a top player in the ten-and-under age category; a fractured hand suffered while playing tennis, however, led him to switch back to chess.

Gomez graduated from De La Salle University with a degree in mechanical engineering.

== Chess career ==
While attending De La Salle, Gomez led the school's chess team to the UAAP men's chess championship for 2004–2005 season. Gomez won five "Most Valuable Player" awards and was named the UAAP's "Athlete of the Year" for Season 71 (2008–2009).

Gomez has won the Philippine National Junior Championship three times. In October 2006, he finished the 45th World Junior Chess Championship with a score of 7.0 out of 13, which was good enough to earn him an IM norm.

In July 2008, he won the Philippine Chess Championship; this not only qualified him for the Philippine team competing in the 38th Chess Olympiad later that year in November, but also earned him his first GM norm. At the Olympiad, Gomez's draw with Czech GM Viktor Láznička in the 9th round was enough to earn his final GM norm and the GM title, making him just the tenth Filipino to do so. Gomez finished the Olympiad as the top scorer for the Philippine team. Gomez also was a member of the Filipino team for the 39th, 40th, 41st, 42nd and 43rd Chess Olympiads.

=== Chess Olympiad ===
Gomez has been a many-time member of the Philippine Team at the Chess Olympiad.

At the 38th Chess Olympiad (2008) held in Dresden, Germany when he was still an International Master (IM), he played Board 4 for the Philippines finishing as the team's top scorer with 7.5/11 on the strength of 5 wins, 5 draws and a solitary loss for a winning percentage of 68.2% with a Tournament Performance Rating (TPR) of 2585 as compared to his 2519 ELO at that time that made him the second strongest Filipino bet in the Olympiad just behind Wesley So (2610) despite being the only IM in the team. He eventually placed 19th in the Individual Standings while the team finished in 46th place.

At the 39th Chess Olympiad (2010) held at Khanty-Mansiysk, Russia, he played Board 2 just behind So where he scored 5.0/9 posting 3 wins, 4 draws and 2 losses for a 55.6 winning percentage and a TPR of 2454 which was below his ELO at that time of 2527. Individually, he placed 49th while the team placed 50th in the team competitions.

At the 41st Chess Olympiad (2014) conducted at Tromsø, Norway, he again manned Board 2 behind GM Julio Sadorra where he posted 5.5/11 by recording 3 wins, 5 draws and 3 losses for a winning percentage of 50% and a TPR of 2466 below than his 2526 ELO at that time. He tied Eugene Torre as the team's second best scorer although Torre scored 5.5 in only 9 games as compared to Gomez' 11 games. Individually, Gomez placed 54th while the team ended up in 46th place.

At the 42nd Chess Olympiad (2016) held at Baku, Azerbaijan, he once again played Board 2 and contributed 5.0/10 registering 4 wins, 2 draws and 4 losses for another 50% winning percentage and a TPR of 2466 which was a shade below than his then 2492 ELO. He placed 57th in the Individual competitions while the team ended up in 58th place.

Finally, at the 43rd Chess Olympiad (2018) conducted at Batumi, Georgia where he again manned Board 2 and scored 4.5/10 on the strength of 2 wins, 5 draws and 3 losses with a TPR of 2351 as against his ELO of 2464 at that time. Team Philippines finished in 37th place.

=== Asian Cities Chess Championship ===
Gomez competed for the Philippines at the 17th and 18th editions of the Asian Cities Chess Championships.

At the 17th edition held in Jakarta, Indonesia in 2011, Gomez played Board 3 where he scored 6.5/9 posting 5 wins, 3 draws and a single loss for a winning percentage of 72.2% with a TPR of 2480 as compared to his 2538 ELO then. His efforts was good enough for a bronze medal while the team ended up in 4th place.

In the 18th edition conducted at Tagaytay City, Cavite, Philippines, Gomez went undefeated ending up as the team's leading scorer with 7.5/9 where he registered 6 wins and 3 draws for an 83.3% winning percentage with a TPR of 2599 as against his ELO then of 2511 where he bagged the gold medal leading the team also to a gold-medal finish in the team competitions.

He finished his stint in this tournament with 2 medals (1 gold, 1 bronze) in individual play and 1 gold medal in team competitions. He has already recorded 14 points in 18 games registering 11 wins, 6 draws and a solitary loss for a high 77.8% winning rate.

=== World Junior Chess Championship ===
Gomez participated in two World Junior Chess Championships.

At the age of 15 years old, Gomez represented the Philippines in the 40th World Junior Chess Championship held at Peristeri, Greece (2001) where he performed creditably by tying for 18th–30th places eventually finishing in 26th with a score of 7.5/13 posting 7 wins, 1 draw and 5 losses with a TPR of 2494;

Gomez was again the lone Philippine representative to the 45th World Junior Chess Championship conducted at Yerevan, Armenia where he finished with 7.0/13 ending up in a tie for 27th–38th places eventually ending up in 30th place registering 6 wins, 2 draws and 5 losses with a TPR of 2480 as against his then ELO of 2387.

=== Asian Individual Chess Championship ===
Gomez also participated in 8 editions of the Asian Individual Chess Championship also known as the Asian Continental Championship, five years consecutively from 2009–2013 and in 2017–2019:

At the 2009 (7th) edition held in Subic Bay Freeport, Zambales, Philippines, he tied for 51st–65th place eventually finishing in 59th place with 5.0/11 in the 11-round Swiss System tournament with 3 wins, 4 draws and the same number of losses for a TPR of 2424 (2538 ELO).

At the 2010 (8th) edition also held at Subic Bay Freeport, Zambales, Philippines, he tied for 28th–42nd place ultimately ending up in 35th place with 5.0/9 in this 9-round Swiss System competitions posting 2 wins, 6 draws and 1 loss with a TPR of 2505 almost equal to his ELO then of 2507.

At the 2011 (9th) edition conducted at Mashhad, Razavi Khorasan Province, Iran, he finished tied for 13th–21st places finally garnering 20th place with 5.0/9 in this 9-round Swiss System tournament registering 3 wins, 4 draws and 2 losses with a TPR of 2484 as against his 2538 ELO that time.

At the 2012 (10th) edition held at Ho Chi Minh City, Vietnam, he tied for 11th–21st place eventually finishing in 12th place with 5.5/9 in this 9-round Swiss System competition ending up with 4 wins, 3 draws and 2 losses with a very high TPR of 2636 (2507 ELO).

At the 2013 (11th) edition conducted at Manila, Philippines, he ended up tied for 11th–24th place ultimately ending up in 11th place scoring 5.5/9 in this 9-round Swiss System championships with 4 wins, 3 draws and 2 losses technically mirroring his performance in the 10th edition where he also posted the same numbers (wins, draws, losses and total score) with a TPR of 2593 as against his ELO of 2511.

At the 2017 (15th) edition held in Chengdu, Sichuan, China, he finished tied for 46th–54th place finally ending up in 50th place posting 4/9 with 2 wins, 4 draws and 3 losses with a TPR of 2369 compared to his 2474 ELO.

In the 17th edition dubbed as the 2nd Manny Pacquiao Cup (2018) where he tied for 20th-28th places with a score of 5.0/9 on the strength of 3 wins, 4 draws and 2 losses with a TPR of 2550 as compared to his 2450 ELO. He ultimately ended up in 27th place, second-best among Filipino players.

In the 18th edition (2019) held from June 7–15, 2019 at Xingtai, China where he ended up tied for the 45th-59th places where he ultimately placed 51st (Ranked 40th) with 4.0/9 recording 2 wins, 4 draws and 3 losses, 2 of which were inflicted by Iranian Super GMs Alireza Firouzja (2682) and Parham Maghsoodloo (2665) in Rounds 1 and 3, respectively. He had a TPR of 2447 as against his 2467 ELO.

=== Asian Games ===
Gomez also played for the Philippines at the 16th Asian Games where he played Board 3 and contributed 4.5/9 by posting 3 wins and the same number of draws and losses for a high TPR of 2559 as against his 2522 ELO with the team surprisingly winning the silver medal as it stunned an All-Super GM team of India (all with 2600 and above ELO), 2.5-1.5, in the semifinals with Gomez drawing against his highly rated opponent GM Surya Shekhar Ganguly who had an ELO of 2644 with GM Rogelio Antonio Jr. (2573) and GM Eugene Torre (2484) posting wins over GM Krishnan Sasikiran (2688) and GM Geetha Narayanan Gopal (2609), respectively, while GM Wesley So (2669) lost against GM Pentala Harikrishna (2657).

=== Asian Club Chess Cup ===
Gomez was also a participant in the 1st Asian Club Chess Cup held at Al-Ain, Abu Dhabi, UAE in 2008 where he played Board 2 and contributed 4.0/7 games recording 3 wins, 2 draws and 2 losses with a 57.1% winning percentage and a TPR of 2479 as against his 2519 ELO at that time. Team Philippines ended up in 4th place.

=== Southeast Asian Games ===
Gomez represented the Philippines at the 2011 Southeast Asian Games held in Palembang, Indonesia and won a silver medal for blindfold chess competitions. Gomez actually finished tied for first with Lê Quang Liêm of Vietnam at seven points apiece, but Liêm was awarded the gold medal by virtue of the winner-over-the-other rule as Gomez had lost to Liem in the 7th round before winning his last 2 games against Malaysian IM Jimmy Liew and IM Tirta Chandra Paurnama of Indonesia in the 8th and 9th rounds.

=== Philippine National Games ===
Gomez won a gold medal representing Albay Province at the 2018 Philippine National Games Chess Championships, Standard Open Competitions where he scored 6.0/7 in the 7-round Swiss System Tournament by posting 5 wins and 2 draws.

=== Other notable tournaments ===
Gomez finished in a tie for 2nd-6th places in the Chennai Open 2012 held from January 4–12, 2012 together with GM Aleksej Aleksandrov of Belarus (2nd), Indian IM Kore Akshayraj (3rd), GM Martyn Kravtsiv of Ukraine (5th) and Uzbek GM Marat Dzhumaev (6th) eventually ending up in 4th place after tie-breaks. Gomez posted 8 wins, 1 draw and 2 losses.

Gomez participated in the 2nd Indonesia Open Chess Championship held from October 11–17, 2012 where he was seeded No. 24 with his 2523 ELO where he tied for the 14th-34th places eventually finishing in 17th place scoring 5.5/9 registering 3 wins, 5 draws and a loss against GM Oleg Korneev (2591) of Spain in the 6th round. Among his notable performances are a victory over Chinese IM Lou Yiping (2444) in the 4th round and a draw versus Super GM Viorel Iordăchescu (2637) of Moldova in the 5th round. He had a TPR of 2490 where he finished as the best-placed Filipino chess player.

In 2014, Gomez took part in the Qatar Masters Open held from November 26 – December 4, 2014 where he was seeded 81st but finished well below the standings as he scored 4.0/9 with 3 wins, 2 draws and 4 losses for a TPR of 2440 way below than his ELO of 2510. Among his notable games in this tournament is a draw against Georgian Super GM Mikheil Mchedlishvili (2622) and losses versus Super GMs Maxime Vachier-Lagrave (2751) of France, Polish Dariusz Swiercz (2616) and GM Ivan Šarić of (2680) Croatia.

He also played in the 7th HDBank Cup International Open Chess held from March 12–17, 2017 in Vietnam where he was seeded 21st with his 2481 ELO but placed a respectable 20th in a field of 103 players with a score of 5.5/9 recording 3 wins, 5 draws and 1 loss suffered against Venezuelan Super GM Eduardo Iturrizaga (2673). However, he did record a draw opposite another Super GM, Ivan Cheparinov (2698) of Bulgaria. He ended up as the best-placed Filipino player that included among others fellow Filipino GMs Rogelio Antonio Jr. (50th), Darwin Laylo (52nd) and Eugene Torre (74th).

GM Gomez, together with GM Julio Sadorra, represented the Philippines in the 5th Asian Indoor and Martial Arts Games Blitz Men (Chess) held in Ashgabat, Turkmenistan from September 17–27, 2017 where the team placed 7th overall with 1 win and 4 draws with Gomez scoring 2.5/5 with 1 wins, 3 draws and 1 loss as Board 2 player.

Gomez tied for 2nd and 3rd places with IM Paulo Bersamina in the 2019 National Chess Championship dubbed as the Battle of the Grandmasters held from November 18–28, 2019 at Quezon City, Philippines won by GM Rogelio Barcenilla. He scored 6.0 points in this 11-round tournament with 3 wins, 6 draws and a lone loss suffered right in the first round against Bersamina.

He finished in the Top Ten of the Joytu Sheikh Hasina International Online Chess Tournament (Bangladesh Invitational) held on September 27, 2020. He scored 6.5 points in the 9-round online chess where he finished strong by scoring 4.5 points in the last 6 rounds after he suffered a 3rd round loss to Indonesian IM Novendra Priasmoro. He actually ended up in a tie for 4th place with second seed GM Nguyễn Ngọc Trường Sơn of Vietnam and Indian GMs Diptayan Ghosh, Gukesh D and R. R. Laxman but settled for 8th place after tie-breaks.
