= Asghar Golizadeh =

Iranian chess grandmaster (born 1990)

Personal information
- Native name: اصغر گلی‌زاده
- Born: 29 July 1990 (age 36) Tabriz, Iran

Chess career
- Country: Iran
- Title: Grandmaster (2011)
- FIDE rating: 2457 (November 2026)
- Peak rating: 2508 (November 2010)

Asghar Golizadeh (Persian: اصغر گلی‌زاده; born 29 July 1990) is an Iranian chess player. He was awarded the titles of FIDE Master in 2009, International Master in 2010, and Grandmaster in 2011.

== Career ==
Golizadeh won the Iranian Chess Championship twice: in 2011–12 (jointly with Ehsan Ghaem-Maghami) and outright in 2012–13.

Representing the Iran national chess team, he competed at the 5th World Youth U16 Chess Olympiad in 2006, three consecutive Chess Olympiads from 2010 to 2014, two Asian Team Chess Championships (2012 and 2014), and the 2010 Asian Games in Guangzhou.

In individual competition, he played in the 8th Asian Chess Championship in 2010, scoring 5½/9 (+3−1=5). In inter-city team events, he represented Tehran at the inaugural World Cities Team Chess Championship in Al Ain in 2012, and played in two Asian Cities Chess Team Championships—for Rah Ahan (Tehran) in 2007 and for the Tehran city team in 2011, winning team bronze and an individual silver medal on the reserve board.
