= Homayoon Toufighi =

Iranian chess grandmaster (born 1990)

Homayoun Tofighi
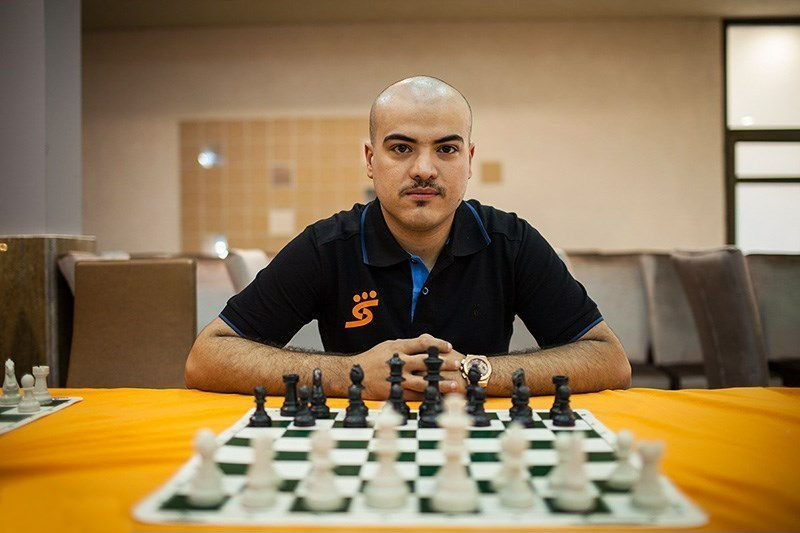

Personal information
- Born: 21 March 1990 (age 36) Rasht, Iran

Chess career
- Country: Iran
- Title: Grandmaster (2010)
- Peak rating: 2501 (July 2010)

Tamijani Homayoon Toufighi (همایون توفیقی; born March 21, 1990) is an Iranian chess grandmaster (2010). He is head coach of the Iranian women's national chess team.

== Chess awards ==
- FIDE trainer (2023)
- International grandmaster (2010)
- International master (2009)
- FIDE master (2006)
- Bronze medal Asian Indoor games, Macau (2007)
- Gold medal Asian championship under 18, Uzbekistan
- Silver medal Asian championship under 18, Iran
- Bronze medal Asian team championship, India
- Bronze medal Asian championship under 14, Singapore
- Bronze medal Asian rapid team championship, Iran
- Individual silver medal Asian championship (board 5), India
- Gold medal International open, Turkmenistan
- Gold medal International open, Dubai
- Gold medal Khorshid International open, Iran
- Gold medal Khazar International open, Iran
- Gold medal Paytakht International open, Iran
- Gold medal Ibn-Sina International open, Iran
- Gold medal Fajr International open, Iran
- Gold medal Iran youth championship in all categories
- Member of the Iran national team (2006–2011)
- Iran Blitz champion (2x)
- Iran Rapid champion (2x)
