= Ahmad Al-Khatib =

Jordanian chess grandmaster (born 1995)

Personal information
- Born: April 28, 1995 (age 31) Madaba, Jordan

Chess career
- Country: Jordan
- Title: Grandmaster (2023)
- Peak rating: 2382 (September 2023)

Ahmad Al-Khatib is a Jordanian chess grandmaster.

== Chess career ==
Al-Khatib is the first Jordanian grandmaster. He was awarded the title in March 2023 after winning the Open section of the Arab Chess Championship. Players can become grandmasters by winning a Continental Chess Championship and having a rating above 2300, without having to earn the standard three grandmaster norms or having a rating above 2500. This is the manner by which Al-Khatib earned his title.

In June 2023, Al-Khatib participated in the 23rd Dubai Open Chess Tournament, where he drew against the higher-rated Sambit Panda in the seventh round.
