= Cao Sang =

Vietnamese chess grandmaster (born 1973)

Personal information
- Born: September 6, 1973 (age 52)

Chess career
- Country: Vietnam (until 2001; since 2010); Hungary (2001–2010)
- Title: Grandmaster (2003)
- Peak rating: 2558 (January 2011)

Cao Sang is a Vietnamese chess grandmaster.

== Chess career ==
He played for Vietnam in the Chess Olympiads from 1990 to 1996.

He moved to Hungary in 1995 and was trained alongside Đào Thiên Hải and Hoàng Thanh Trang under Levente Lengyel. He won a First Saturday GM tournament in December 1995 as an untitled player, earning an IM norm. He switched his national federation to Hungary in 2001.

In June 2002, he tied for second place with grandmaster Zoltan Gyimesi in the Hungarian Chess Championship. He was ranked second after tiebreaks.

He was the fourth Vietnamese player to earn the Grandmaster title, having done so in 2003.

He played in the Chess World Cup 2005, where he defeated Andrei Volokitin in the first round but lost to Xu Jun in the second round.

In 2010, he changed his national federation back to Vietnam.

In March 2022, he tied for first place with four players in the Vietnamese Blitz Chess Championship, but lost the title after tiebreaks.
