= Morteza Mahjoub =

Iranian chess grandmaster (born 1980)

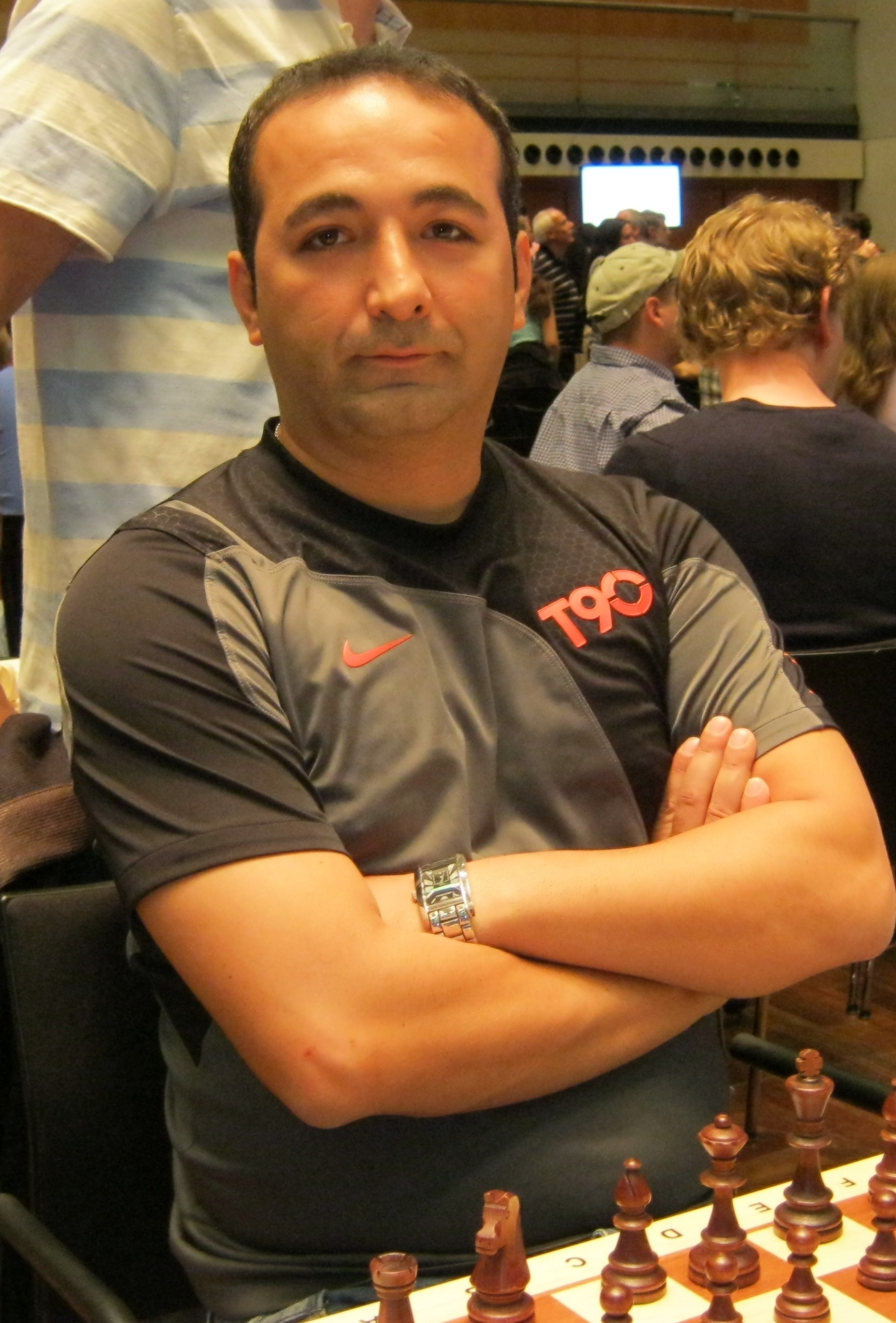
- Morteza Mahjoob, 2010

Personal information
- Born: Morteza Mahjoub Zardast; 20 March 1980 (age 46) Tehran, Iran

Chess career
- Country: Iran
- Title: Grandmaster (2007)
- Peak rating: 2546 (July 2010)

Morteza Mahjoub or Morteza Mahjoob (Persian: مرتضی محجوب, born 20 March 1980) is an Iranian chess grandmaster. He won Iranian Chess Championship in 2005 and 2008.

In 2005 his rating was 2442 and in 2016 his rating was 2354. In 2007 he became grandmaster.

In September 2005 he won Iranian Chess Championship with the score 9.5 points out of 11.

Mahjoob previously held the world record for simultaneous exhibition, which he set on 13 August 2009. He walked 18 hours and won 397 of the games, 90 draws and 13 loses. His record was broken on 21 October 2010, by GM Alik Gershon.
