= Zillur Rahman (professor) =

Indian professor of management studies

- ज़िल्लूर रहमान
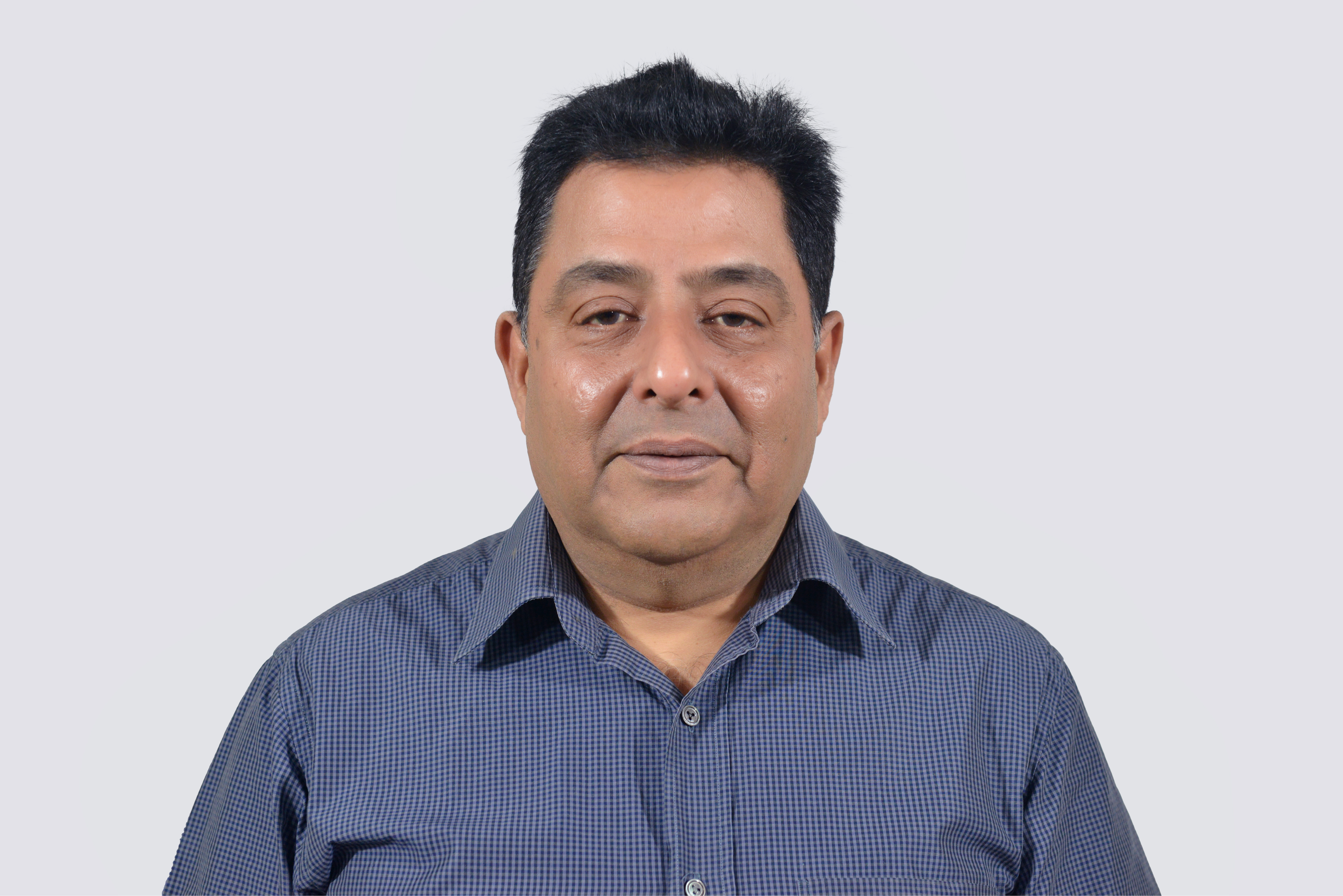
- Born: 30 March 1965 (age 61)
- Education: Aligarh Muslim University
- Children: 3
- Scientific career
- Fields: Marketing
- Workplaces: Department of Management Studies, IIT Roorkee
- Website: https://www.iitr.ac.in/~DM/Zillur_Rahman

Zillur Rahman (born 30 March 1965) is a former professor of Management studies at the Indian Institute of Technology Roorkee in Roorkee, Uttarakhand, India. Until May 2025, he was with the university, when the institute dismissed him after disciplinary proceedings following a sexual-harassment complaint by a research scholar.

== Early life and education ==
Rahman holds a MSc in Mathematics, MBA and Ph.D in Business administration, all from Aligarh Muslim University

== Career ==
He is a Senior Professor at the Department of Management Studies, IIT Roorkee and was the Head of the Department from 2016 to 2019. His primary research interests are in areas of Marketing, Strategic management, Services marketing and Consumer behaviour.

== Controversies ==
In January 2025, a PhD scholar working under his supervision filed a sexual-harassment complaint against him. Following an internal inquiry under the institute’s rules and the PoSH framework, the IIT Roorkee Board of Governors approved his dismissal. The institute described it as the first dismissal of a faculty member of its kind in its history. In December 2025, Rahman filed writ petition in the Delhi High Court, challenging his termination based on the ICC inquiry. On 15 December 2025, the court noted that a statutory appeal was pending and directed that it be decided expeditiously.
