= Handszar Odeev =

Turkmenistani chess grandmaster (born 1972)

Personal information
- Born: 27 January 1972 (age 54)

Chess career
- Country: Turkmenistan
- Title: Grandmaster (2004)
- Peak rating: 2502 (January 2006)

Handszar Odeev (born 27 January 1972) is a Turkmen chess grandmaster (2004).

He played a record seven times (first time, at the age of 12) in the Soviet Union Junior Chess Championships: in 1984, 1985, 1986, 1987, 1988, 1989 and 1990. Played for Turkmenistan in the Chess Olympiads of 1994, 1996, 1998, 2000, 2002, 2006 and 2010 and in the Asian Team Chess Championship of 2003. In October 1999, he tied for 2nd–10th with Eduardas Rozentalis, Ian Rogers, Vereslav Eingorn, Giorgi Giorgadze, Vlastimil Jansa, Christian Bauer, Konstantin Lerner and Alexander Shabalov in the 5th Wichern-Open tournament in Hamburg, with 30 grandmasters participating.

In the March 2011 FIDE list, he has an Elo rating of 2405, making him Turkmenistan's number six.
