= Yevgeniy Vladimirov =

Kazakhstani chess grandmaster (born 1957)

Personal information
- Born: 20 January 1957 (age 69) Alma Ata, Kazakh SSR, Soviet Union

Chess career
- Country: Soviet Union → Kazakhstan
- Title: Grandmaster (1989)
- FIDE rating: 2601 (July 2026)
- Peak rating: 2628 (July 2004)
- Peak ranking: No. 49 (July 1989)

Yevgeniy Yuryevich Vladimirov (Russian: Евгений Юрьевич Владимиров; born 20 January 1957) is a chess player and trainer from Kazakhstan. He was awarded the title of Grandmaster by FIDE in 1989.

== Career ==
In 2004, during the 14th Abu Dhabi Chess Festival, Vladimirov played a match against the computer program Hydra, losing three games and drawing one.

He acted as one of Garry Kasparov's seconds in his 1986 World Championship match against Anatoly Karpov, when he was accused by Kasparov of giving information about his preparation to Karpov. However, no proof of Vladimirov's treason have ever been produced. In 2004 he was awarded the title of FIDE Senior Trainer. In 2014, at the 1st Annual Asian Chess Excellence Awards in Al Ain, Vladimirov was voted the best coach of the year.
