= Nguyễn Đức Hòa =

Vietnamese chess grandmaster (born 1989)

Personal information
- Born: 13 July 1989 (age 36)

Chess career
- Country: Vietnam
- Title: Grandmaster (2014)
- Peak rating: 2518 (January 2015)

Nguyễn Đức Hòa (born 13 July 1989) is a Vietnamese chess Grandmaster (GM) (2014). He is a 3-time Vietnamese Chess Champion (2012, 2013, and 2014), and a two-time Asian Team Chess Championship team bronze medal winner (2012, 2014).

== Biography ==
In 2012, 2013, and 2014, Nguyễn Đức Hòa won the Vietnamese Chess Championship. He is a multiple International Chess Tournaments winner, include Penang (2012, 2015), Bhubaneswar (2017), Bhopal (2017), Mumbai (2017).

Nguyễn Đức Hòa played for Vietnam in the Chess Olympiad:

- In 2010, at reserve board in the 39th Chess Olympiad in Khanty-Mansiysk (+1, =2, -1),
- In 2012, at fourth board in the 40th Chess Olympiad in Istanbul (+2, =7, -1),
- In 2014, at third board in the 41st Chess Olympiad in Tromsø (+5, =3, -2).

Nguyễn Đức Hòa played for Vietnam in the Men's Asian Team Chess Championships:

- In 2012, at third board in the 17th Asian Team Chess Championship in Zaozhuang (+5, =1, -2) and won team bronze medal,
- In 2014, at third board in the 18th Asian Team Chess Championship in Tabriz (+4, =1, -3) and won team bronze medal.

In 2011, he was awarded the FIDE International Master (IM) title and received the FIDE Grandmaster (GM) title three years later.
