= Rani Hamid =

Bangladeshi chess player (born 1944)

- রাণী হামিদ
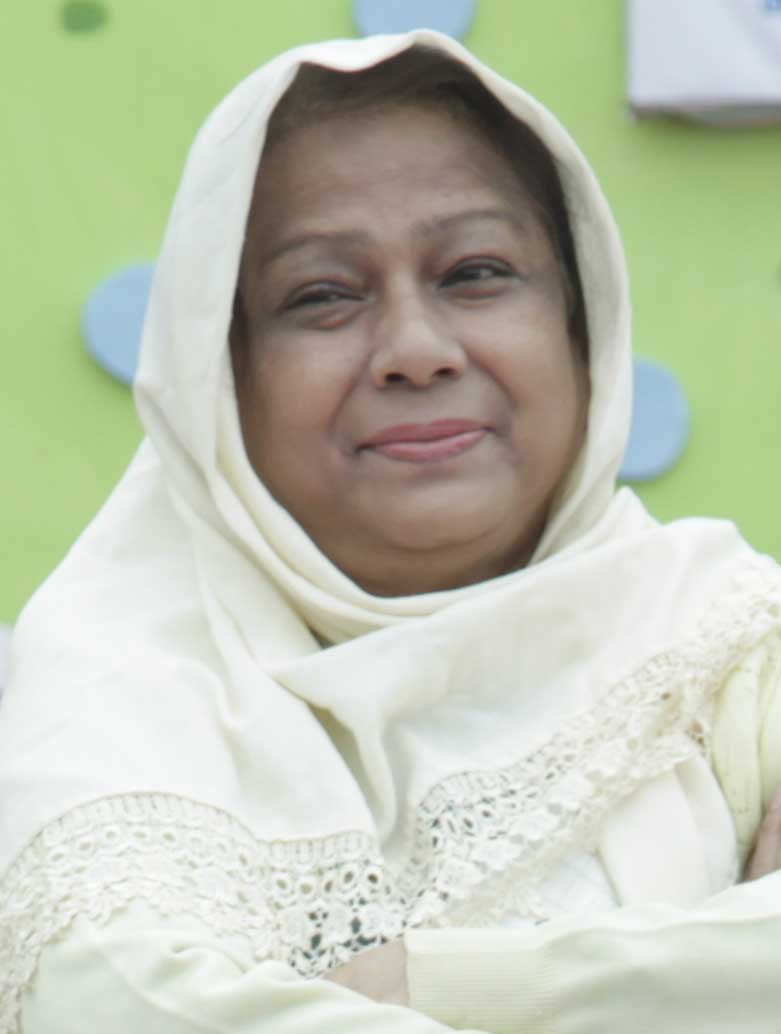
- Hamid in 2012
- Born: Sayeda Jasimunnessa Khatun; 14 July 1944 (age 82); Sylhet, Assam Province, British India (Currently Bangladesh)
- Education: Sylhet Girls' School; Eden Mohila College
- Occupation: Chess player
- Spouse: M. A. Hamid (m. 1959; died 2008)
- Children: Kaiser Hamid
- Honours: Begum Rokeya Padak (2024)
- Chess career
- Country: Bangladesh
- Title: Woman International Master (1985)
- Peak rating: 2230 (July 1988)

Rani Hamid (born 14 July 1944) is a Bangladeshi chess player. She became the country's first Woman International Master in 1985. She has been the national champion 20 times, most recently at the 38th Women National Championship at the age of 75. She had won her 19th National Women's Chess Championship title in August 2018. She is also a three-time winner of the British Women's Chess Championship. She became Zonal Champion in 2018, received the Journalists Choice Award in the Chess World Cup 2018 in Russia, and won the gold medal in Commonwealth Chess 2017 in Delhi.

== Early life and career ==
Hamid was born Sayeda Jasimunnessa Khatun in Sylhet in 1944. She started playing chess at the age of 34.

Hamid won the national title for six consecutive years from 1979 to 1984. Starting from 1984, Hamid played in all World Chess Olympiads (three times in the general team). She was awarded the FIDE Woman International Master (WIM) title in 1985 and won the British Women's Championship in 1983 (jointly with Helen Milligan), 1985 and 1989.

Hamid received the gold medal in Commonwealth Chess 2017 in Delhi. She was the Zonal Champion in 2018 and won the "Journalists Choice Award" at the Chess World Cup 2018 in Russia.

Hamid won her 20th Bangladesh National Women's title in September 2019. This is the most Bangladeshi Women's Championship titles by a wide margin.

In September 2024, at the age of 80, Hamid defeated Springer Leshay of Barbados in the 3rd round match of the 45th Chess Olympiad, in Budapest, Hungary as Bangladesh's women's team beat Barbados with a 3.5-0.5 score.

== Personal life ==
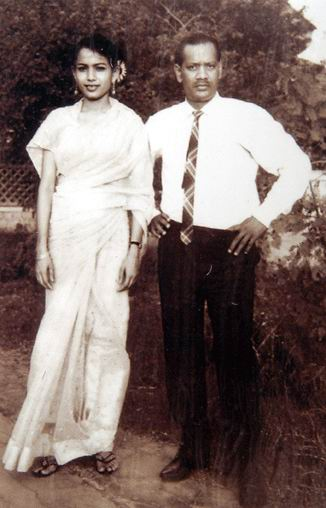
Hamid with her husband MA Hamid, after their wedding in 1959.

Hamid was married to Lieutenant colonel MA Hamid, a sports organiser, from 1959 to 2008 (his death). Their son Kaiser Hamid is a former football player for Mohammedan Sporting Club and the captain of Bangladesh national football team during the 1980s and 1990s. Her other son, Sohel Hamid, was a national squash champion. Her youngest son, Shajahan Hamid Bobby (d. 2022), was a national handball player and a first division football league player. Her daughter is Jabin Hamid. Her granddaughter, Karina Kyser was a popular video content creator in Bangladesh, who died in May 2026 due fatty liver complications.
