= Basheer Al-Qudaimi =

Yemeni chess player (born 1984)

Basheer Al Qudaimi
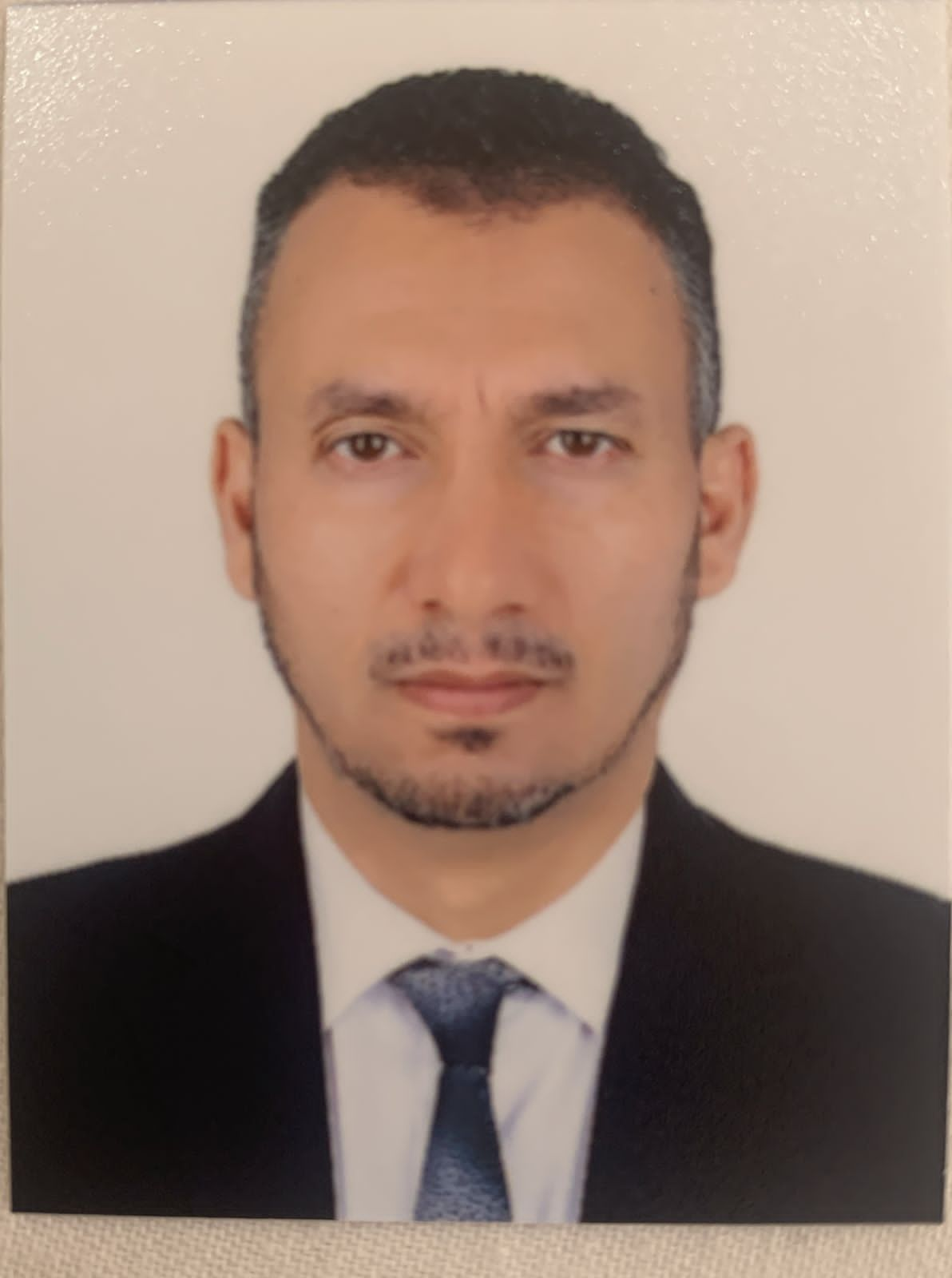
- Basheer Al Qudaimi in 2024

Personal information
- Born: December 31, 1984 (age 41)

Chess career
- Country: Yemen
- Title: International Master (2008)
- Peak rating: 2464 (July 2008)

Basheer Al-Qudaimi (Arabic: بشير القديمي; born December 31, 1984) is a Yemeni chess player who holds the title of International Master (IM) (since 2008), and Arab Chess Championship winner (in 2007). He is the Chess Olympiad individual gold medal winner (in 2006).

== Biography ==
In 2003, Al-Qudaimi with Yemen club Al-Wahda Sana'a won 3rd place in the Arab Club Chess Championship. In 2007 in Taiz, he won the Arab Chess Championship.

Al-Qudaimi played for the Yemen team in the Chess Olympiads:

- In 2002, at second reserve board in the 35th Chess Olympiad in Bled (+9, =1, -1),
- In 2006, at reserve board in the 37th Chess Olympiad in Turin (+7, =0, -0) and won individual gold medal,
- In 2008, at reserve board in the 38th Chess Olympiad in Dresden (+5, =2, -3),
- In 2010, at second board in the 39th Chess Olympiad in Khanty-Mansiysk (+3, =1, -6),
- In 2014, at first board in the 41st Chess Olympiad in Tromsø (+4, =4, -2),
- In 2018, at first board in the 43rd Chess Olympiad in Batumi (+6, =2, -1).

Also he played for Yemen team in the Asian Games chess tournament (2010) and Pan Arab Games chess tournament (2007-2011), where he won individual gold medal.

In 2008, Basheer Al-Qudaimi was awarded the FIDE International Master (IM) title.
