= Rustam Kasimdzhanov =

Uzbek chess grandmaster (born 1979)

- Kasimdzhanov at the 2026 Chess Olympiad

Personal information
- Born: 5 December 1979 (age 46) Tashkent, Uzbek SSR, Soviet Union

Chess career
- Country: Uzbekistan
- Title: Grandmaster (1997)
- World Champion: 2004–2005 (FIDE)
- FIDE rating: 2665 (September 2026)
- Peak rating: 2715 (May 2015)
- Ranking: No. 48 (September 2026)
- Peak ranking: No. 11 (October 2001)

Rustam Kasimdzhanov (Note: Uzbek: Rustam Qosimjonov; Russian: Рустам Касымджанов.) (born 5 December 1979) is an Uzbek chess grandmaster and a former FIDE World Chess Champion (2004–2005). He was Asian champion in 1998.

In addition to his tournament play, Kasimdzhanov was a longtime second to Viswanathan Anand, including during the 2008, 2010 and 2012 World Championship matches. He has also trained World Championship candidates Sergey Karjakin and Fabiano Caruana.

== Early career ==
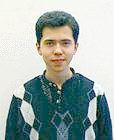
Kasimdzhanov 1999 at Porz

His best results include first in the 1998 Asian Chess Championship, second in the World Junior Chess Championship in 1999, first at Essen 2001, first at Pamplona 2002 (winning a blitz playoff against Victor Bologan after both had finished the main tournament on 3½/6), first with 8/9 at the HZ Chess Tournament 2003 in Vlissingen, joint first with Liviu Dieter Nisipeanu with 6/9 at Pune 2005, a bronze-medal winning performance (score of 9½/12 points) on board one for his country at the 2000 Chess Olympiad and runner-up in the FIDE Chess World Cup in 2002 (losing to Viswanathan Anand in the final). He has played in the prestigious Wijk aan Zee tournament twice, but did not perform well either time: in 1999 he finished 11th of 14 with 5/13, in 2002 he finished 13th of 14 with 4½/13.

== FIDE World Chess Champion 2004 ==
In the FIDE World Chess Championship 2004 in Tripoli, Libya, Kasimdzhanov unexpectedly made his way through to the final, winning mini-matches against Alejandro Ramírez, Ehsan Ghaem Maghami, Vasyl Ivanchuk, Zoltán Almási, Alexander Grischuk and Veselin Topalov to meet Michael Adams to play for the title and the right to face world number one Garry Kasparov in a match.

In the final six-game match of the Championship, both players won two games, making a tie-break of rapid games necessary. Kasimdzhanov won the first game with black, after having been in a difficult position. By drawing the second game he became the new FIDE champion.

== Other world championship results ==
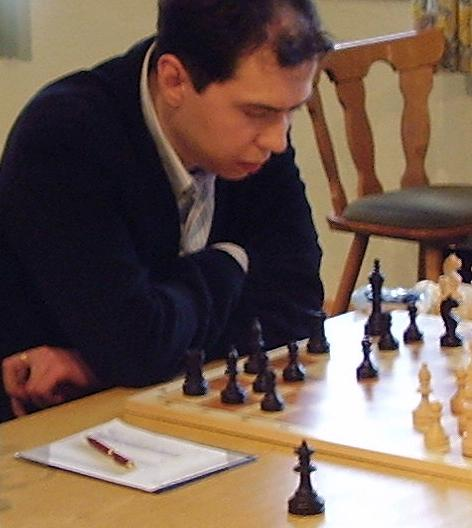
GM Kasimdzhanov

Kasimdzhanov's 2004 championship victory earned him an invitation to the eight-player FIDE World Chess Championship 2005, where he tied with Michael Adams for 6th–7th places.

The 2004 championship also earned him one of sixteen places in the Candidates Tournament for the FIDE World Chess Championship 2007. His first round opponent was Boris Gelfand. In their match, all six regular games were drawn. Then Gelfand won the rapid tie-break 2½–½, eliminating Kasimdzhanov from the tournament.

== Career since championship ==
On June 23, 2005, in the ABC Times Square studios, the AI Accoona Toolbar driven by a Fritz 9 prototype engine, drew against him.

He made his first appearance at Linares in 2005, finishing tied last with 4/12 points. In 2006, Kasimdzhanov won the knockout Corsica Masters tournament.

Kasimdzhanov won gold in the individual men's rapid event at the 2010 Asian Games. In the following year he won the inaugural Central Asia Chess Cup in Tashkent.

In 2015 he won the Highlander Cup, a rapid knockout tournament, at the Global Chess Festival, that took place in Budapest and was organized by Judit Polgár.

He speaks fluent Uzbek, Russian, English and German.

== Trainer and second ==
Kasimdzhanov was a second for former World Champion Viswanathan Anand, having worked with Anand in preparation for and during his successful World Chess Championship title defences in October 2008 against Vladimir Kramnik, April–May 2010 against Veselin Topalov and in May 2012 against Boris Gelfand.

He coached the German national team which won the European Team Chess Championship in 2011.

Kasimdzhanov was the trainer of Sergey Karjakin in the Candidates Tournament of 2014, and of Fabiano Caruana in the Candidates Tournament 2016. He was one of Caruana's seconds during the 2018 World Chess Championship match. He currently trains young Indian grandmaster Arjun Erigaisi. At the Tata Steel Chess Tournament in 2023, young grandmaster Nodirbek Abdusattorov revealed that he had begun working with his fellow Uzbek grandmaster Kasimdzhanov over the past year.

== Notable games ==
- Rustam Kasimdzhanov vs Viktor Korchnoi, Julian Borowski-A 4th 2002, French Defense: Classical, Burn Variation (C11), 1–0
- Michael Adams vs Rustam Kasimdzhanov, FIDE World Championship Knockout Tournament 2004, Sicilian Defense: Nyezhmetdinov–Rossolimo Attack (B30), 0–1
- Veselin Topalov vs Rustam Kasimdzhanov, FIDE World Championship Knockout Tournament 2004, Queen's Indian Defense: Anti-Queen's Indian System (E17), 0–1
- Rustam Kasimdzhanov vs Viswanathan Anand, FIDE World Championship Tournament 2005, Sicilian Defense: Najdorf Variation, English Attack Anti-English (B90), 1–0

== Notes ==
Awards and achievements
Preceded by Ruslan Ponomariov	FIDE World Chess Champion; 2004–2005	Succeeded by Veselin Topalov
