= Zillur Rahman Champak =

Bangladeshi chess player

Zillur Rahman
Personal information
- Full name: Zillur Rahman Champak
- Born: 1967 (age 58–59)

Chess career
- Country: Bangladesh
- Title: International Master (1990)
- FIDE rating: 2295 (January 2001)
- Peak rating: 2415 (July 1990)

Zillur Rahman Champak (born 1967) is a Bangladeshi chess player who received the FIDE title of International Master (IM) in 1990. He won back-to-back national titles in 1986 and 1987.

== Career ==
Rahman earned the International Master title in 1990. All of his IM qualifying norms were obtained at tournaments held in Dhaka.

He has represented Bangladesh in several Chess Olympiads, from 1980 to 2000.
