= Shakil Abu Sufian =

Bangladesh chess player (born 1980)

Personal information
- Born: November 1, 1980 (age 45)

Chess career
- Country: Bangladesh
- Title: International Master (2011)
- Peak rating: 2418 (July 2008)

Shakil Abu Sufian (born 1980) is a Bangladeshi chess player International Master and National Chess Coach.

== Career ==
Md. Abu Sufian earned the FIDE Master title in 2001 and International Master title in 2011. Both of his title he got from Asian Zonal Chess Championship from Colombo, Sri Lanka. He represented Bangladesh in several chess competitions from 2005 to 2015. he is also doing a job as a National Chess Coach of National Sports Council of Bangladesh since 2006. he was elected as General Secretary of Association of Chess players, Bangladesh at 2014 and currently he is the President of this (ACPB) organisation. He participated three times in Chess Olympiad (Turin, Italy in 2006; Dresden, Germany in 2008 and Khanty-Manshisk, Russia in 2010) on behalf of the Bangladesh Chess team.
