= Enamul Hossain =

Bangladeshi chess grandmaster (born 1981)

Personal information
- Born: September 30, 1981 (age 45)

Chess career
- Country: Bangladesh
- Title: Grandmaster (2008)
- Peak rating: 2531 (April 2009)

Enamul Hossain (Bengali: এনামুল হোসেন; born 1981) is a Bangladeshi chess grandmaster. He is the fifth and most recent chess player from Bangladesh to become a Grandmaster, earning the title in 2008.

He defeated Pavel Eljanov in a two-game match in Chess World Cup 2007, becoming the only Bangladeshi to qualify for the second round of a Chess World Cup. He also won the Bangladeshi Chess Championship four times.

== Early life and career ==
Enamul Hossain was born in 1981 and grew up in Dhaka. He learned the rules of chess from his father. In 1993, he played his first chess tournament; which piqued his interest in the game. His first FIDE rating was 2255, published in January 1996. He owned only two chess books (one of those being Bobby Fischer's My 60 Memorable Games) and he studied those multiple times; it was due to the unavailability of chess books in his country. He played his first Bangladeshi Chess Championship in 1995. He received coaching from Michał Krasenkow in the same year, (Note: Krasenkow mentions in his book that he spent several months as a trainer of the Bangladeshi national team in 1995.) which is also the only formal coaching he has received. He played as a member of the Bangladeshi team in Chess Olympiad for the first time when he was 15 years old.

Hossain won his first Bangladeshi championship in 1997. He earned the International Master (IM) title in 2002. He got his 1st Grandmaster norm in the 35th Chess Olympiad in Bled, Slovenia the same year he became an IM and achieved his 2nd norm in a Grandmaster tournament in Abu Dhabi in 2007. Since he already reached 2500 rating once in October 2006, which is also required for claiming the Grandmaster title, he became the fifth Grandmaster (GM) from Bangladesh when he fulfilled his 3rd norm in the final round of Bangladeshi championship on 4 May 2008. He qualified for participating in Chess World Cup 2007 and became the only Bangladeshi player to qualify for the second round in a world cup. He did so by defeating Pavel Eljanov; although it was the only world cup he was able to qualify for. He reached his peak rating in April 2009 with a value of 2531.

Hossain now works as a chess coach.

== Achievements ==
Hossain earned the highest title in chess – the Grandmaster title – in 2008. He beat Pavel Eljanov (rated 2691 at that time) in a two-game match in the 2007 Chess World Cup, drawing the first and winning the second game. By doing so, he became the only Bangladeshi player to reach the second round of a chess world cup. He finished in 10th place in the Asian Chess Championship in 2007. He won a GM tournament in Vizag, India in 2012 against a field of 17 grandmasters. He won the Bangladeshi Chess Championship four times – in 1997, 2006, 2016 and 2017.
