= Geetha Narayanan Gopal =

Indian chess grandmaster (born 1989)

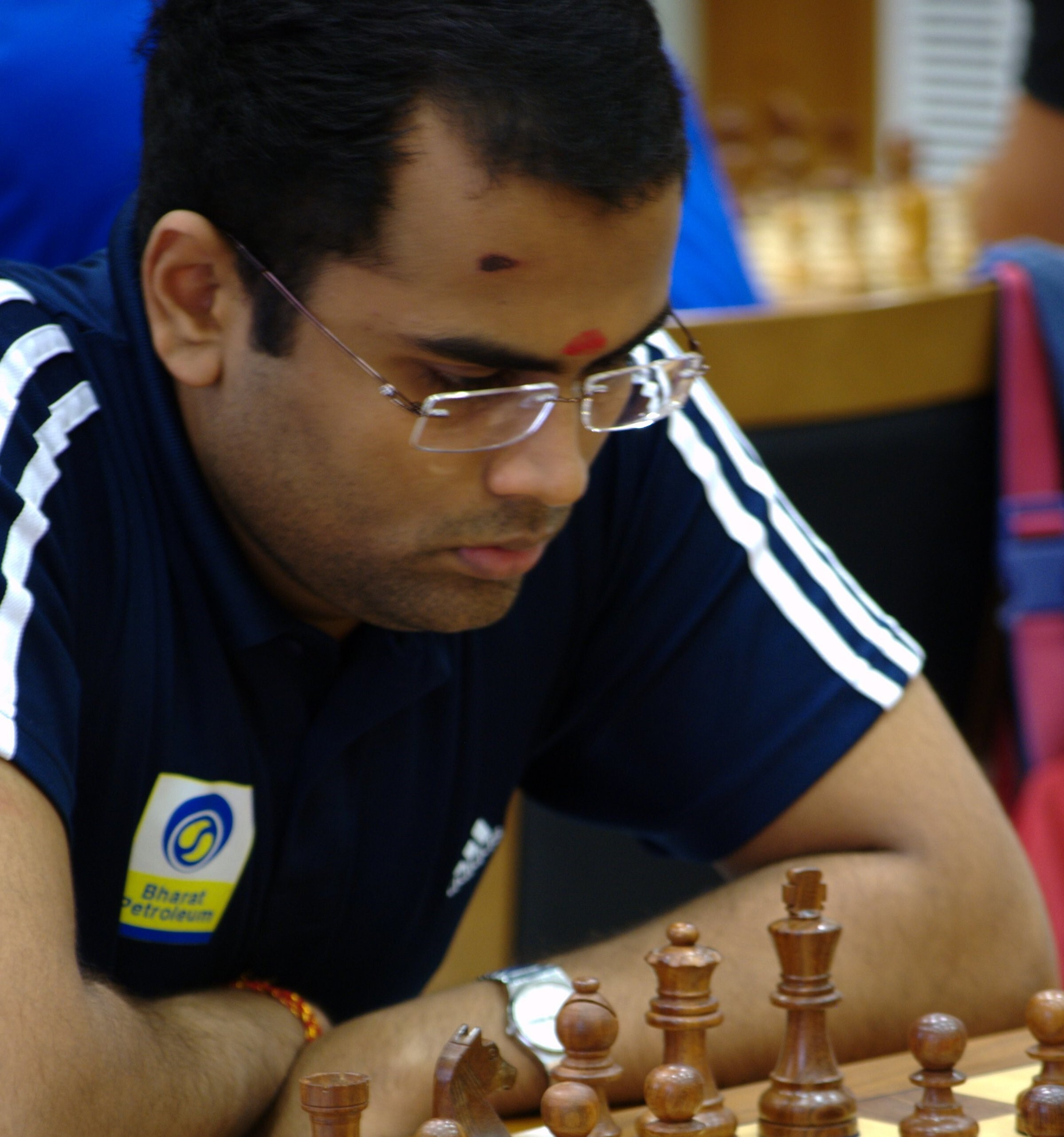
- Gopal in 2011

Personal information
- Born: 29 March 1989 (age 37) Muvattupuzha, Kerala, India

Chess career
- Country: India
- Title: Grandmaster (2007)
- FIDE rating: 2530 (September 2026)
- Peak rating: 2611 (July 2010)

G.N. Gopal (born 29 March 1989) is an Indian chess grandmaster from Cochin, Kerala. Gopal became Kerala's first grandmaster in 2007 at 18 and India's sixteenth grandmaster.

He won the bronze medal in the prestigious 2010 Asian Games in Guangzhou, China in November 2010. He also won the bronze medal in the World Team Championship held in Bursa, Turkey in January 2010.

== Early life ==
Gopal was born into a Nair family in Muvattupuzha as the second son of Prof B. Narayana Pillai and Prof Geetha Prakasini. He has an elder brother, Gokul, who is a Computer Engineer.

Gopal started chess at the age of 10. He was initiated into chess by his father. He won his first national championship in Chandigarh in 2001. He became the National Junior Champion (U-20) at the age of 15 in 2004. He won his first international championship in his first international exposure in 2003 in Dubai Juniors, Dubai.

== Personal life ==
Gopal is working as an Assistant Manager at Bharat Petroleum. He lives in Aluva.

Key achievements

- Created history at the age of 18 by becoming Kerala's first & sixteenth Grand Master of the country.

National events

- Gold in National Junior (U-20) 2004 in Tirupathi (2004)
- Silver in National Premier (Men's) Championship in Delhi (Dec 2010)
- Tied for second spot in the National Premier (Men's) Championship in Chennai (2008)
- Gold in National U-12 Rapid in Chandigarh (2001)
- Silver in National Junior in Delhi (August 2006)

Asian events

- Bronze medal in the Asian Games 2010 held in Guangzhou, China (Nov 2010)
- Silver in Asian Team Championship in China (May 2012)
- Silver in Asian Zonals Dhaka 2007
- Silver in Asian Team Championship, Vizag, 2008 and Gold medal on board-4 for individual performance
- Bronze for board performance in Asian Team Blitz Championship (May 2012)
- Bronze in Asian Sub-Junior Championship, Teheran, 2004
- Qualified to the FIDE World Cup from the Asian Continental Championship in Philippines, 2007

Olympiads and World Team 2010

Olympiads: He has represented India in three successive Chess Olympiads namely Dresden 2008, Khanty-Mansiysk 2010 and Istanbul 2012

World Team Chess Championship 2010: His team India won bronze in the prestigious World Team 2010

== Recognition ==
He received the Tigran Mets Medal during the Lake Sevan 2007 as the joint winner. The Tigran Mets Medal is a prestigious honor of Armenia.
