= Bangladesh Chess Federation =

National Chess Federation in Bangladesh

- বাংলাদেশ দাবা ফেডারেশন
- Formation: 1974; 52 years ago
- Headquarters: Dhaka, Bangladesh
- Location: Krira Kaksha, National Sports Council Old Building, 62/3 Purana Paltan, Dhaka
- Region served: Bangladesh
- Official language: Bengali
- Website: www.bdchessfederation.com

Bangladesh Chess Federation is the national federation for chess and is responsible for governing the sport in Bangladesh. Captain Syed Sujauddin Ahmed is the President of Bangladesh Chess Federation. Dr.Taibur Rahman (Fide Master) is the General Secretary of Bangladesh Chess Federation.

== History ==
Bangladesh Chess Federation was founded by Qazi Motahar Hossain. Qazi Motahar Hossain was the founding president of All Pakistan National Chess Federation. After the Independence of Bangladesh, he founded the Bangladesh Daba Sangha. The Daba Sangha was re-organized into the Bangladesh Chess Federation, which was established in 1974. Qazi Motahar Hossain became the founding president of the Bangladesh Chess Federation. In 1985, Bangladesh Chess Federation started the annual Dr. Qazi Motahar Hossain International Masters Chess Tournament named after its founding president.

In January 2006, Captain Syed Sujauddin Ahmed was appointed President of the Bangladesh Chess Federation replacing Akhter Hossain Khan, Secretary of the Ministry of Planning.
