= Niaz Murshed =

Bangladeshi chess grandmaster (born 1966)

Personal information
- Born: 13 May 1966 (age 60) Dhaka, East Pakistan (now in Bangladesh)

Chess career
- Country: Bangladesh
- Title: Grandmaster (1987)
- Peak rating: 2525 (July 1993)

Niaz Murshed (born 13 May 1966) is a Bangladeshi chess grandmaster. In 1987, at the age of 21, he became the first South Asian to earn the grandmaster title.

== Early life ==
Murshed was born in Dhaka, East Pakistan (present-day Bangladesh). He picked up the game from his older brother. His neighbor was Jamilur Rahman, who later became a national champion himself. These favorable conditions may have contributed to the young Murshed's devotion to chess. Murshed passed his SSC exam in 1983 from St. Joseph Higher Secondary School and HSC exam in 1985 from Dhaka College.

== Career ==
=== Domestic chess ===
As a nine-year-old, Murshed entered the preliminary rounds of the national chess championship. By the age of 12, In 1978, he finished first in the national championship with two others, but ultimately placed third on a tie-breaker. He went on to win the next four national championships in 1979, 1980, 1981 and 1982.

He became the national champion again after 30 years in 2012.

=== International chess ===
In 1979, Murshed played in his first international competition at Kolkata, India. In 1981, placed second in the zonal tournament, held in Sharjah, UAE the same year, earning the International Master title in the process. Later that year, he tied for first in the Asian Junior Championship, held in Dhaka, but was counted second on tiebreak since he had fewer wins (and losses) than Ricardo de Guzman (Philippines) who was awarded the title and automatic IM. Murshed participated in the 1982 World Junior Chess Championship, and although he failed to replicate his recent success, his game against Lars Schandorff of Denmark (later a grandmaster) was selected as the best game of the tournament.

Murshed earned his first Grandmaster norm in 1984 due to his success in Bela Crkva Open in the then Yugoslavia (1983), Oakham School Youth Tournament (ahead of Nigel Short and Maxim Dlugy), Commonwealth Chess Championship, Hong Kong 1984. He earned his second grandmaster norm in 1986 because of his performance in Capstain International Tournament, Dhaka (1985) and Calcutta Grandmasters Tournament, Calcutta (1986). In 1987, FIDE awarded him the Grandmaster title, making him the first GM in South Asia.

Upon earning his bachelor's degree in economics, Murshed returned to chess. However, his playing declined when he found it hard to adapt to the new generation of information driven chess. Nonetheless, he still found success from time to time in the international scene: first in the Goodrich, India (1991), second in the GM Tournament, Cebu, Philippines (1992), third in the Doha Chess Festival, Qatar (1993), T-1st place with two other contestants in the zonal tournament (1993), and finally, T-2nd place in the Commonwealth Chess Championship in 2004.

In November 2009, he tied for 3rd–8th with Anton Filippov, Elshan Moradiabadi, Merab Gagunashvili, Alexander Shabalov and Vadim Malakhatko in the Ravana Challenge Tournament in Colombo.

=== Chess teams ===
Murshed played for Bangladesh in the Chess Olympiads of 1984, 1990, 1994, 1996, 2002, 2004, 2012 and 2014.

== Education ==
After earning his Grand Master title, Murshed went to the University of Pennsylvania to study economics. He played in only a handful chess tournaments during this time, but earned his bachelor's degree.
