= Chess at the 2010 Asian Games – Women's individual rapid =

Women's individual rapid at the 2010 Asian Games
- Venue: Guangzhou Chess Institute
- Date: 13–16 November 2010
- Competitors: 38 from 20 nations

Medalists
gold medal	Hou Yifan	China
silver medal	Zhao Xue	China
bronze medal	Harika Dronavalli	India

The women's individual rapid competition at the 2010 Asian Games in Guangzhou was held from 13 November to 16 November at the Guangzhou Chess Institute.

== Schedule ==
All times are China Standard Time (UTC+08:00)

Date	Time	Event
Saturday, 13 November 2010	15:00	Round 1
Saturday, 13 November 2010	16:30	Round 2
Sunday, 14 November 2010	15:00	Round 3
Sunday, 14 November 2010	16:30	Round 4
Monday, 15 November 2010	15:00	Round 5
Monday, 15 November 2010	16:30	Round 6
Monday, 15 November 2010	18:00	Round 7
Tuesday, 16 November 2010	15:00	Round 8
Tuesday, 16 November 2010	16:30	Round 9

== Results ==
Legend

- WO — Walkover

=== Round 1 ===
White	Score	Black
Afamia Mir Mahmoud (SYR)	0–1	Hou Yifan (CHN)
Harika Dronavalli (IND)	1–0	Sharmin Sultana Shirin (BAN)
Alia Anin Bakri (MAS)	0–1	Zhu Chen (QAT)
Zhao Xue (CHN)	1–0	Delbak Ismael (IRQ)
Jannar Worya (IRQ)	0–1	Tania Sachdev (IND)
Irene Kharisma Sukandar (INA)	1–0	Noura Mohamed Saleh (UAE)
Monalisa Khamboo (NEP)	0–1	Atousa Pourkashian (IRI)
Nafisa Muminova (UZB)	1–0	Kholoud Al-Zarouni (UAE)
Nur Nabila Azman Hisham (MAS)	0–1	Phạm Lê Thảo Nguyên (VIE)
Tövshintögsiin Batchimeg (MGL)	1–0	Fatemah Al-Jeldah (SYR)
Mähri Geldiýewa (TKM)	1–0	Narumi Uchida (JPN)
Boshra Al-Shaeby (JOR)	0–1	Hoàng Thị Bảo Trâm (VIE)
Gulmira Dauletova (KAZ)	1–0	Salama Al-Khelaifi (QAT)
Byun Sung-won (KOR)	0–1	Shadi Paridar (IRI)
Guliskhan Nakhbayeva (KAZ)	1–0	Kim Hyo-young (KOR)
Asmita Adhikari (NEP)	1–0	Bahar Hallaýewa (TKM)
Moomina Mohamed (MDV)	0–1 WO	Shamima Akter Liza (BAN)
Nodira Nodirjanova (UZB)	1–0	Raya Al-Nuimat (JOR)
Nusra Abdul Rahman (MDV)	0–0 WO	Altan-Ölziin Enkhtuul (MGL)

=== Round 2 ===
White	Score	Black
Hou Yifan (CHN)	1–0	Tövshintögsiin Batchimeg (MGL)
Hoàng Thị Bảo Trâm (VIE)	1–0	Harika Dronavalli (IND)
Zhu Chen (QAT)	1–0	Mähri Geldiýewa (TKM)
Shadi Paridar (IRI)	0–1	Zhao Xue (CHN)
Tania Sachdev (IND)	1–0	Gulmira Dauletova (KAZ)
Shamima Akter Liza (BAN)	0–1	Irene Kharisma Sukandar (INA)
Atousa Pourkashian (IRI)	0–1	Guliskhan Nakhbayeva (KAZ)
Phạm Lê Thảo Nguyên (VIE)	1–0	Nodira Nodirjanova (UZB)
Altan-Ölziin Enkhtuul (MGL)	½–½	Nafisa Muminova (UZB)
Sharmin Sultana Shirin (BAN)	1–0	Asmita Adhikari (NEP)
Bahar Hallaýewa (TKM)	1–0	Nur Nabila Azman Hisham (MAS)
Narumi Uchida (JPN)	0–1	Afamia Mir Mahmoud (SYR)
Salama Al-Khelaifi (QAT)	0–1	Alia Anin Bakri (MAS)
Delbak Ismael (IRQ)	1–0	Boshra Al-Shaeby (JOR)
Kim Hyo-young (KOR)	0–1	Jannar Worya (IRQ)
Noura Mohamed Saleh (UAE)	1–0	Byun Sung-won (KOR)
Fatemah Al-Jeldah (SYR)	1–0	Monalisa Khamboo (NEP)
Kholoud Al-Zarouni (UAE)	1–0	Raya Al-Nuimat (JOR)
Moomina Mohamed (MDV)	0–1	Nusra Abdul Rahman (MDV)

=== Round 3 ===
White	Score	Black
Irene Kharisma Sukandar (INA)	0–1	Hou Yifan (CHN)
Phạm Lê Thảo Nguyên (VIE)	1–0	Zhu Chen (QAT)
Zhao Xue (CHN)	1–0	Hoàng Thị Bảo Trâm (VIE)
Guliskhan Nakhbayeva (KAZ)	0–1	Tania Sachdev (IND)
Nafisa Muminova (UZB)	0–1	Harika Dronavalli (IND)
Alia Anin Bakri (MAS)	0–1	Atousa Pourkashian (IRI)
Tövshintögsiin Batchimeg (MGL)	1–0	Sharmin Sultana Shirin (BAN)
Mähri Geldiýewa (TKM)	1–0	Delbak Ismael (IRQ)
Gulmira Dauletova (KAZ)	1–0	Noura Mohamed Saleh (UAE)
Jannar Worya (IRQ)	0–1	Shadi Paridar (IRI)
Nusra Abdul Rahman (MDV)	0–1	Bahar Hallaýewa (TKM)
Asmita Adhikari (NEP)	0–1	Shamima Akter Liza (BAN)
Nodira Nodirjanova (UZB)	1–0	Kholoud Al-Zarouni (UAE)
Afamia Mir Mahmoud (SYR)	1–0	Fatemah Al-Jeldah (SYR)
Monalisa Khamboo (NEP)	0–1	Altan-Ölziin Enkhtuul (MGL)
Nur Nabila Azman Hisham (MAS)	1–0	Kim Hyo-young (KOR)
Byun Sung-won (KOR)	0–1	Narumi Uchida (JPN)
Boshra Al-Shaeby (JOR)	1–0	Moomina Mohamed (MDV)
Raya Al-Nuimat (JOR)	0–1	Salama Al-Khelaifi (QAT)

=== Round 4 ===
White	Score	Black
Hou Yifan (CHN)	1–0	Phạm Lê Thảo Nguyên (VIE)
Tania Sachdev (IND)	0–1	Zhao Xue (CHN)
Harika Dronavalli (IND)	1–0	Gulmira Dauletova (KAZ)
Zhu Chen (QAT)	1–0	Guliskhan Nakhbayeva (KAZ)
Shadi Paridar (IRI)	½–½	Irene Kharisma Sukandar (INA)
Atousa Pourkashian (IRI)	1–0	Nodira Nodirjanova (UZB)
Bahar Hallaýewa (TKM)	½–½	Tövshintögsiin Batchimeg (MGL)
Shamima Akter Liza (BAN)	½–½	Mähri Geldiýewa (TKM)
Hoàng Thị Bảo Trâm (VIE)	1–0	Afamia Mir Mahmoud (SYR)
Delbak Ismael (IRQ)	0–1	Nafisa Muminova (UZB)
Altan-Ölziin Enkhtuul (MGL)	1–0	Alia Anin Bakri (MAS)
Sharmin Sultana Shirin (BAN)	1–0	Boshra Al-Shaeby (JOR)
Narumi Uchida (JPN)	1–0	Jannar Worya (IRQ)
Noura Mohamed Saleh (UAE)	1–0	Asmita Adhikari (NEP)
Kholoud Al-Zarouni (UAE)	1–0	Nusra Abdul Rahman (MDV)
Salama Al-Khelaifi (QAT)	0–1	Nur Nabila Azman Hisham (MAS)
Fatemah Al-Jeldah (SYR)	1–0	Byun Sung-won (KOR)
Moomina Mohamed (MDV)	0–1	Monalisa Khamboo (NEP)
Kim Hyo-young (KOR)	0–1	Raya Al-Nuimat (JOR)

=== Round 5 ===
White	Score	Black
Zhao Xue (CHN)	0–1	Hou Yifan (CHN)
Harika Dronavalli (IND)	1–0	Atousa Pourkashian (IRI)
Hoàng Thị Bảo Trâm (VIE)	0–1	Zhu Chen (QAT)
Phạm Lê Thảo Nguyên (VIE)	1–0	Tania Sachdev (IND)
Irene Kharisma Sukandar (INA)	1–0	Bahar Hallaýewa (TKM)
Nafisa Muminova (UZB)	1–0	Shadi Paridar (IRI)
Tövshintögsiin Batchimeg (MGL)	1–0	Shamima Akter Liza (BAN)
Mähri Geldiýewa (TKM)	0–1	Altan-Ölziin Enkhtuul (MGL)
Gulmira Dauletova (KAZ)	1–0	Kholoud Al-Zarouni (UAE)
Guliskhan Nakhbayeva (KAZ)	1–0	Narumi Uchida (JPN)
Nodira Nodirjanova (UZB)	1–0	Fatemah Al-Jeldah (SYR)
Afamia Mir Mahmoud (SYR)	½–½	Noura Mohamed Saleh (UAE)
Nur Nabila Azman Hisham (MAS)	1–0	Sharmin Sultana Shirin (BAN)
Alia Anin Bakri (MAS)	1–0	Boshra Al-Shaeby (JOR)
Asmita Adhikari (NEP)	0–1	Delbak Ismael (IRQ)
Jannar Worya (IRQ)	½–½	Salama Al-Khelaifi (QAT)
Raya Al-Nuimat (JOR)	1–0	Monalisa Khamboo (NEP)
Nusra Abdul Rahman (MDV)	0–1	Kim Hyo-young (KOR)
Byun Sung-won (KOR)	1–0	Moomina Mohamed (MDV)

=== Round 6 ===
White	Score	Black
Hou Yifan (CHN)	½–½	Harika Dronavalli (IND)
Zhu Chen (QAT)	½–½	Zhao Xue (CHN)
Nafisa Muminova (UZB)	0–1	Phạm Lê Thảo Nguyên (VIE)
Altan-Ölziin Enkhtuul (MGL)	½–½	Irene Kharisma Sukandar (INA)
Tania Sachdev (IND)	1–0 WO	Tövshintögsiin Batchimeg (MGL)
Atousa Pourkashian (IRI)	1–0	Nur Nabila Azman Hisham (MAS)
Guliskhan Nakhbayeva (KAZ)	0–1	Hoàng Thị Bảo Trâm (VIE)
Nodira Nodirjanova (UZB)	0–1	Gulmira Dauletova (KAZ)
Noura Mohamed Saleh (UAE)	0–1	Mähri Geldiýewa (TKM)
Shadi Paridar (IRI)	1–0	Shamima Akter Liza (BAN)
Bahar Hallaýewa (TKM)	1–0	Afamia Mir Mahmoud (SYR)
Sharmin Sultana Shirin (BAN)	1–0	Kholoud Al-Zarouni (UAE)
Narumi Uchida (JPN)	½–½	Alia Anin Bakri (MAS)
Delbak Ismael (IRQ)	½–½	Fatemah Al-Jeldah (SYR)
Raya Al-Nuimat (JOR)	½–½	Jannar Worya (IRQ)
Salama Al-Khelaifi (QAT)	1–0	Asmita Adhikari (NEP)
Monalisa Khamboo (NEP)	0–1	Byun Sung-won (KOR)
Boshra Al-Shaeby (JOR)	1–0	Nusra Abdul Rahman (MDV)
Kim Hyo-young (KOR)	1–0	Moomina Mohamed (MDV)

=== Round 7 ===
White	Score	Black
Zhu Chen (QAT)	0–1	Hou Yifan (CHN)
Phạm Lê Thảo Nguyên (VIE)	½–½	Harika Dronavalli (IND)
Zhao Xue (CHN)	1–0	Irene Kharisma Sukandar (INA)
Tania Sachdev (IND)	1–0	Altan-Ölziin Enkhtuul (MGL)
Hoàng Thị Bảo Trâm (VIE)	1–0	Atousa Pourkashian (IRI)
Gulmira Dauletova (KAZ)	0–1	Tövshintögsiin Batchimeg (MGL)
Bahar Hallaýewa (TKM)	0–1	Nafisa Muminova (UZB)
Mähri Geldiýewa (TKM)	½–½	Shadi Paridar (IRI)
Sharmin Sultana Shirin (BAN)	0–1	Guliskhan Nakhbayeva (KAZ)
Nur Nabila Azman Hisham (MAS)	1–0	Nodira Nodirjanova (UZB)
Shamima Akter Liza (BAN)	1–0	Delbak Ismael (IRQ)
Afamia Mir Mahmoud (SYR)	1–0	Salama Al-Khelaifi (QAT)
Alia Anin Bakri (MAS)	1–0	Raya Al-Nuimat (JOR)
Fatemah Al-Jeldah (SYR)	½–½	Noura Mohamed Saleh (UAE)
Kholoud Al-Zarouni (UAE)	1–0	Narumi Uchida (JPN)
Jannar Worya (IRQ)	½–½	Boshra Al-Shaeby (JOR)
Byun Sung-won (KOR)	½–½	Kim Hyo-young (KOR)
Nusra Abdul Rahman (MDV)	1–0	Monalisa Khamboo (NEP)
Moomina Mohamed (MDV)	0–1	Asmita Adhikari (NEP)

=== Round 8 ===
White	Score	Black
Hou Yifan (CHN)	1–0	Hoàng Thị Bảo Trâm (VIE)
Zhao Xue (CHN)	1–0	Phạm Lê Thảo Nguyên (VIE)
Harika Dronavalli (IND)	½–½	Tania Sachdev (IND)
Tövshintögsiin Batchimeg (MGL)	1–0	Zhu Chen (QAT)
Atousa Pourkashian (IRI)	0–1	Nafisa Muminova (UZB)
Irene Kharisma Sukandar (INA)	1–0	Mähri Geldiýewa (TKM)
Altan-Ölziin Enkhtuul (MGL)	1–0	Gulmira Dauletova (KAZ)
Shadi Paridar (IRI)	1–0	Guliskhan Nakhbayeva (KAZ)
Shamima Akter Liza (BAN)	1–0	Nur Nabila Azman Hisham (MAS)
Alia Anin Bakri (MAS)	0–1	Bahar Hallaýewa (TKM)
Kholoud Al-Zarouni (UAE)	0–1	Afamia Mir Mahmoud (SYR)
Noura Mohamed Saleh (UAE)	0–1	Nodira Nodirjanova (UZB)
Fatemah Al-Jeldah (SYR)	0–1	Sharmin Sultana Shirin (BAN)
Delbak Ismael (IRQ)	½–½	Jannar Worya (IRQ)
Narumi Uchida (JPN)	1–0	Kim Hyo-young (KOR)
Boshra Al-Shaeby (JOR)	1–0	Byun Sung-won (KOR)
WFM Salama Al-Khelaifi (QAT)	1–0	Nusra Abdul Rahman (MDV)
Raya Al-Nuimat (JOR)	1–0	Moomina Mohamed (MDV)
Asmita Adhikari (NEP)	1–0	Monalisa Khamboo (NEP)

=== Round 9 ===
White	Score	Black
Tania Sachdev (IND)	0–1	Hou Yifan (CHN)
Nafisa Muminova (UZB)	0–1	Zhao Xue (CHN)
Phạm Lê Thảo Nguyên (VIE)	½–½	Tövshintögsiin Batchimeg (MGL)
Irene Kharisma Sukandar (INA)	0–1	Harika Dronavalli (IND)
Hoàng Thị Bảo Trâm (VIE)	½–½	Shadi Paridar (IRI)
Zhu Chen (QAT)	1–0	Altan-Ölziin Enkhtuul (MGL)
Bahar Hallaýewa (TKM)	1–0	Shamima Akter Liza (BAN)
Afamia Mir Mahmoud (SYR)	0–1	Mähri Geldiýewa (TKM)
Gulmira Dauletova (KAZ)	½–½	Atousa Pourkashian (IRI)
Guliskhan Nakhbayeva (KAZ)	1–0	Nur Nabila Azman Hisham (MAS)
Nodira Nodirjanova (UZB)	1–0	Sharmin Sultana Shirin (BAN)
Salama Al-Khelaifi (QAT)	0–1	Narumi Uchida (JPN)
Boshra Al-Shaeby (JOR)	½–½	Raya Al-Nuimat (JOR)
Delbak Ismael (IRQ)	1–0	Alia Anin Bakri (MAS)
Jannar Worya (IRQ)	½–½	Noura Mohamed Saleh (UAE)
Kim Hyo-young (KOR)	1–0	Asmita Adhikari (NEP)
Monalisa Khamboo (NEP)	0–1	Kholoud Al-Zarouni (UAE)
Moomina Mohamed (MDV)	0–1	Fatemah Al-Jeldah (SYR)
Nusra Abdul Rahman (MDV)	0–1	Byun Sung-won (KOR)

=== Summary ===
Rank	Athlete	Rtg	Round									Total	HH	ARO
Rank	Athlete	Rtg	1	2	3	4	5	6	7	8	9	Total	HH	ARO
1st place, gold medalist(s)	Hou Yifan (CHN)	2591	1	1	1	1	1	½	1	1	1	8½		2354
2nd place, silver medalist(s)	Zhao Xue (CHN)	2474	1	1	1	1	0	½	1	1	1	7½		2332
3rd place, bronze medalist(s)	Harika Dronavalli (IND)	2525	1	0	1	1	1	½	½	½	1	6½		2328
4	Phạm Lê Thảo Nguyên (VIE)	2337	1	1	1	0	1	1	½	0	½	6	½	2348
5	Tövshintögsiin Batchimeg (MGL)	2327	1	0	1	½	1	0	1	1	½	6	½	2177
6	Tania Sachdev (IND)	2385	1	1	1	0	0	1	1	½	0	5½		2305
7	Hoàng Thị Bảo Trâm (VIE)	2271	1	1	0	1	0	1	1	0	½	5½		2301
8	Zhu Chen (QAT)	2477	1	1	0	1	1	½	0	0	1	5½		2285
9	Nafisa Muminova (UZB)	2360	1	½	0	1	1	0	1	1	0	5½		2228
10	Shadi Paridar (IRI)	2253	1	0	1	½	0	1	½	1	½	5½		2183
11	Bahar Hallaýewa (TKM)	2184	0	1	1	½	0	1	0	1	1	5½		1938
12	Irene Kharisma Sukandar (INA)	2382	1	1	0	½	1	½	0	1	0	5		2275
13	Altan-Ölziin Enkhtuul (MGL)	2121	0	½	1	1	1	½	0	1	0	5		2131
14	Mähri Geldiýewa (TKM)	2279	1	0	1	½	0	1	½	0	1	5		2117
15	Guliskhan Nakhbayeva (KAZ)	2209	1	1	0	0	1	0	1	0	1	5		2087
16	Nodira Nodirjanova (UZB)	2149	1	0	1	0	1	0	0	1	1	5		1884
17	Atousa Pourkashian (IRI)	2367	1	0	1	1	0	1	0	0	½	4½		2161
18	Gulmira Dauletova (KAZ)	2263	1	0	1	0	1	1	0	0	½	4½		2154
19	Afamia Mir Mahmoud (SYR)	2010	0	1	1	0	½	0	1	1	0	4½		1985
20	Shamima Akter Liza (BAN)	2161	1	0	1	½	0	0	1	1	0	4½		1955
21	Narumi Uchida (JPN)	1834	0	0	1	1	0	½	0	1	1	4½		1883
22	Nur Nabila Azman Hisham (MAS)	1845	0	0	1	1	1	0	1	0	0	4		2058
23	Delbak Ismael (IRQ)	1929	0	1	0	0	1	½	0	½	1	4		1926
24	Sharmin Sultana Shirin (BAN)	1998	0	1	0	1	0	1	0	1	0	4		1903
25	Fatemah Al-Jeldah (SYR)	0	0	1	0	1	0	½	½	0	1	4		1887
26	Kholoud Al-Zarouni (UAE)	1864	0	1	0	1	0	0	1	0	1	4		1877
27	Raya Al-Nuimat (JOR)	0	0	0	0	1	1	½	0	1	½	4		1763
28	Boshra Al-Shaeby (JOR)	1807	0	0	1	0	0	1	½	1	½	4		1696
29	Alia Anin Bakri (MAS)	1953	0	1	0	0	1	½	1	0	0	3½		1964
30	Noura Mohamed Saleh (UAE)	1884	0	1	0	1	½	0	½	0	½	3½		1888
31	Jannar Worya (IRQ)	1901	0	1	0	0	½	½	½	½	½	3½		1823
32	Salama Al-Khelaifi (QAT)	1761	0	0	1	0	½	1	0	1	0	3½		1712
33	Byun Sung-won (KOR)	1612	0	0	0	0	1	1	½	0	1	3½		1623
34	Kim Hyo-young (KOR)	1355	0	0	0	0	1	1	½	0	1	3½		1578
35	Asmita Adhikari (NEP)	0	1	0	0	0	0	0	1	1	0	3		1817
36	Nusra Abdul Rahman (MDV)	0	0	1	0	0	0	0	1	0	0	2		1753
37	Monalisa Khamboo (NEP)	1877	0	0	0	1	0	0	0	0	0	1		1552
38	Moomina Mohamed (MDV)	0	0	0	0	0	0	0	0	0	0	0		1512
