= Chess at the 2010 Asian Games – Women's team standard =

Women's team standard at the 2010 Asian Games
- Venue: Guangzhou Chess Institute
- Date: 18–26 November 2010
- Competitors: 53 from 12 nations

Medalists
gold medal	China; Hou Yifan, Ju Wenjun, Zhao Xue, Huang Qian, Wang Yu
silver medal	Uzbekistan; Nafisa Muminova, Olga Sabirova, Yulduz Hamrakulova, Nodira Nodirjanova
bronze medal	Vietnam; Hoàng Thị Bảo Trâm, Phạm Lê Thảo Nguyên, Nguyễn Thị Thanh An, Nguyễn Thị Mai Hưng, Nguyễn Thị Tường Vân

The women's team standard competition at the 2010 Asian Games in Guangzhou was held from 18 November to 26 November at the Guangzhou Chess Institute.

== Schedule ==
All times are China Standard Time (UTC+08:00)

Date	Time	Event
Thursday, 18 November 2010	15:00	Round 1
Friday, 19 November 2010	13:00	Round 2
Saturday, 20 November 2010	15:00	Round 3
Sunday, 21 November 2010	15:00	Round 4
Monday, 22 November 2010	13:00	Round 5
Tuesday, 23 November 2010	15:00	Round 6
Wednesday, 24 November 2010	15:00	Round 7
Thursday, 25 November 2010	15:00	Semifinals
Friday, 26 November 2010	13:00	Finals

== Results ==
Legend

- WO — Walkover

=== Preliminary round ===
==== Round 1 ====
	Score	
Mongolia	0–4	China
Uuganbayaryn Lkhamsüren	0–1	Ju Wenjun
Tövshintögsiin Batchimeg	0–1	Zhao Xue
Altan-Ölziin Enkhtuul	0–1	Huang Qian
—	0–1 WO	Wang Yu
India	3½–½	Turkmenistan
Tania Sachdev	1–0	Mähri Geldiýewa
Eesha Karavade	½–½	Bahar Hallaýewa
Subbaraman Meenakshi	1–0	Maýsa Öwezowa
Nisha Mohota	1–0 WO	—
Qatar	1–3	Vietnam
Zhu Chen	1–0	Hoàng Thị Bảo Trâm
Reem Safar	0–1	Nguyễn Thị Thanh An
Aisha Al-Khelaifi	0–1	Nguyễn Thị Mai Hưng
Kholoud Al-Khelaifi	0–1	Nguyễn Thị Tường Vân
Iran	4–0	Syria
Atousa Pourkashian	1–0	Fatemah Al-Jeldah
Shadi Paridar	1–0	Kheele Wasila Al-Shikh
Mitra Hejazipour	1–0	Afamia Mir Mahmoud
Shayesteh Ghaderpour	1–0 WO	—
South Korea	0–4	Uzbekistan
You Ga-ram	0–1	Nafisa Muminova
Lim Hak-yung	0–1	Olga Sabirova
Kim Tae-gyeong	0–1	Yulduz Hamrakulova
Kim Hyo-young	0–1	Nodira Nodirjanova
Bangladesh	4–0	Jordan
Shamima Akter Liza	1–0	Safa Abuganiya
Sharmin Sultana Shirin	1–0	Ebtsam Adee
Rani Hamid	1–0	Tamara Al-Khatib
Nazrana Khan Eva	1–0	Boshra Al-Shaeby

==== Round 2 ====
	Score	
China	3–1	Iran
Hou Yifan	1–0	Atousa Pourkashian
Ju Wenjun	½–½	Shadi Paridar
Huang Qian	1–0	Mitra Hejazipour
Wang Yu	½–½	Ghazal Hakimifard
Uzbekistan	1½–2½	India
Nafisa Muminova	½–½	Harika Dronavalli
Olga Sabirova	½–½	Eesha Karavade
Yulduz Hamrakulova	½–½	Subbaraman Meenakshi
Nodira Nodirjanova	0–1	Nisha Mohota
Vietnam	4–0	Bangladesh
Phạm Lê Thảo Nguyên	1–0	Shamima Akter Liza
Nguyễn Thị Thanh An	1–0	Sharmin Sultana Shirin
Nguyễn Thị Mai Hưng	1–0	Rani Hamid
Nguyễn Thị Tường Vân	1–0	Nazrana Khan Eva
Syria	0–3	Mongolia
Fatemah Al-Jeldah	0–1	Uuganbayaryn Lkhamsüren
Kheele Wasila Al-Shikh	0–1	Tövshintögsiin Batchimeg
Afamia Mir Mahmoud	0–1	Altan-Ölziin Enkhtuul
—	0–0	—
Turkmenistan	3–1	South Korea
Mähri Geldiýewa	1–0	Lim Hak-yung
Bahar Hallaýewa	1–0	Byun Sung-won
Maýsa Öwezowa	1–0	Kim Tae-gyeong
—	0–1 WO	Kim Hyo-young
Jordan	0–4	Qatar
Safa Abuganiya	0–1	Salama Al-Khelaifi
Ebtsam Adee	0–1	Reem Safar
Boshra Al-Shaeby	0–1	Aisha Al-Khelaifi
Raya Al-Nuimat	0–1	Kholoud Al-Khelaifi

==== Round 3 ====
	Score	
India	2–2	China
Harika Dronavalli	½–½	Hou Yifan
Tania Sachdev	½–½	Ju Wenjun
Eesha Karavade	½–½	Zhao Xue
Nisha Mohota	½–½	Huang Qian
Iran	1½–2½	Vietnam
Atousa Pourkashian	1–0	Hoàng Thị Bảo Trâm
Shadi Paridar	0–1	Phạm Lê Thảo Nguyên
Mitra Hejazipour	½–½	Nguyễn Thị Thanh An
Ghazal Hakimifard	0–1	Nguyễn Thị Mai Hưng
Mongolia	½–3½	Uzbekistan
Uuganbayaryn Lkhamsüren	0–1	Nafisa Muminova
Tövshintögsiin Batchimeg	½–½	Olga Sabirova
Altan-Ölziin Enkhtuul	0–1	Yulduz Hamrakulova
—	0–1 WO	Nodira Nodirjanova
Bangladesh	2½–1½	Turkmenistan
Shamima Akter Liza	0–1	Mähri Geldiýewa
Sharmin Sultana Shirin	1–0	Bahar Hallaýewa
Rani Hamid	½–½	Maýsa Öwezowa
Nazrana Khan Eva	1–0 WO	—
Qatar	1–3	Syria
Salama Al-Khelaifi	0–1	Fatemah Al-Jeldah
Reem Safar	0–1	Kheele Wasila Al-Shikh
Aisha Al-Khelaifi	0–1	Afamia Mir Mahmoud
Kholoud Al-Khelaifi	1–0 WO	—
South Korea	2½–1½	Jordan
Lim Hak-yung	½–½	Ebtsam Adee
Byun Sung-won	1–0	Tamara Al-Khatib
Kim Tae-gyeong	0–1	Boshra Al-Shaeby
Kim Hyo-young	1–0	Raya Al-Nuimat

==== Round 4 ====
	Score	
Vietnam	1½–2½	India
Hoàng Thị Bảo Trâm	½–½	Harika Dronavalli
Phạm Lê Thảo Nguyên	0–1	Tania Sachdev
Nguyễn Thị Thanh An	½–½	Eesha Karavade
Nguyễn Thị Tường Vân	½–½	Subbaraman Meenakshi
China	2½–1½	Bangladesh
Ju Wenjun	½–½	Shamima Akter Liza
Zhao Xue	0–1	Sharmin Sultana Shirin
Huang Qian	1–0	Nazrana Khan Eva
Wang Yu	1–0	Masuda Begum
Uzbekistan	4–0	Qatar
Nafisa Muminova	1–0	Salama Al-Khelaifi
Olga Sabirova	1–0	Reem Safar
Yulduz Hamrakulova	1–0	Aisha Al-Khelaifi
Nodira Nodirjanova	1–0	Kholoud Al-Khelaifi
Turkmenistan	1½–2½	Iran
Mähri Geldiýewa	1–0	Atousa Pourkashian
Bahar Hallaýewa	0–1	Shadi Paridar
Maýsa Öwezowa	½–½	Mitra Hejazipour
—	0–1 WO	Ghazal Hakimifard
Syria	2½–1½	South Korea
Fatemah Al-Jeldah	1–0	You Ga-ram
Kheele Wasila Al-Shikh	½–½	Lim Hak-yung
Afamia Mir Mahmoud	1–0	Byun Sung-won
—	0–1 WO	Kim Hyo-young
Jordan	1–3	Mongolia
Safa Abuganiya	0–1	Uuganbayaryn Lkhamsüren
Ebtsam Adee	0–1	Tövshintögsiin Batchimeg
Boshra Al-Shaeby	0–1	Altan-Ölziin Enkhtuul
Raya Al-Nuimat	1–0 WO	—

==== Round 5 ====
	Score	
Vietnam	½–3½	China
Hoàng Thị Bảo Trâm	0–1	Hou Yifan
Phạm Lê Thảo Nguyên	0–1	Ju Wenjun
Nguyễn Thị Mai Hưng	0–1	Zhao Xue
Nguyễn Thị Tường Vân	½–½	Wang Yu
India	3½–½	Mongolia
Harika Dronavalli	1–0	Uuganbayaryn Lkhamsüren
Tania Sachdev	½–½	Tövshintögsiin Batchimeg
Subbaraman Meenakshi	1–0	Altan-Ölziin Enkhtuul
Nisha Mohota	1–0 WO	—
Iran	1½–2½	Uzbekistan
Atousa Pourkashian	1–0	Nafisa Muminova
Shadi Paridar	0–1	Olga Sabirova
Mitra Hejazipour	0–1	Yulduz Hamrakulova
Shayesteh Ghaderpour	½–½	Nodira Nodirjanova
Bangladesh	4–0	Syria
Shamima Akter Liza	1–0	Fatemah Al-Jeldah
Sharmin Sultana Shirin	1–0	Kheele Wasila Al-Shikh
Rani Hamid	1–0	Afamia Mir Mahmoud
Masuda Begum	1–0 WO	—
Qatar	2½–1½	South Korea
Zhu Chen	1–0	Lim Hak-yung
Reem Safar	1–0	Byun Sung-won
Aisha Al-Khelaifi	½–½	Kim Tae-gyeong
Kholoud Al-Khelaifi	0–1	Kim Hyo-young
Jordan	1½–2½	Turkmenistan
Safa Abuganiya	0–1	Mähri Geldiýewa
Tamara Al-Khatib	0–1	Bahar Hallaýewa
Boshra Al-Shaeby	½–½	Maýsa Öwezowa
Raya Al-Nuimat	1–0 WO	—

==== Round 6 ====
	Score	
China	3–1	Uzbekistan
Hou Yifan	1–0	Nafisa Muminova
Ju Wenjun	½–½	Olga Sabirova
Zhao Xue	1–0	Yulduz Hamrakulova
Huang Qian	½–½	Nodira Nodirjanova
Bangladesh	½–3½	India
Shamima Akter Liza	½–½	Harika Dronavalli
Sharmin Sultana Shirin	0–1	Eesha Karavade
Nazrana Khan Eva	0–1	Subbaraman Meenakshi
Masuda Begum	0–1	Nisha Mohota
Turkmenistan	½–3½	Vietnam
Mähri Geldiýewa	½–½	Hoàng Thị Bảo Trâm
Bahar Hallaýewa	0–1	Phạm Lê Thảo Nguyên
Maýsa Öwezowa	0–1	Nguyễn Thị Thanh An
—	0–1 WO	Nguyễn Thị Mai Hưng
Mongolia	2–2	Qatar
Uuganbayaryn Lkhamsüren	0–1	Zhu Chen
Tövshintögsiin Batchimeg	1–0	Salama Al-Khelaifi
Altan-Ölziin Enkhtuul	1–0	Reem Safar
—	0–1 WO	Aisha Al-Khelaifi
South Korea	0–4	Iran
You Ga-ram	0–1	Atousa Pourkashian
Byun Sung-won	0–1	Mitra Hejazipour
Kim Tae-gyeong	0–1	Ghazal Hakimifard
Kim Hyo-young	0–1	Shayesteh Ghaderpour
Syria	3–1	Jordan
Fatemah Al-Jeldah	1–0	Safa Abuganiya
Kheele Wasila Al-Shikh	1–0	Ebtsam Adee
Afamia Mir Mahmoud	1–0	Tamara Al-Khatib
—	0–1 WO	Raya Al-Nuimat

==== Round 7 ====
	Score	
India	4–0	Syria
Tania Sachdev	1–0	Fatemah Al-Jeldah
Eesha Karavade	1–0	Kheele Wasila Al-Shikh
Subbaraman Meenakshi	1–0	Afamia Mir Mahmoud
Nisha Mohota	1–0 WO	—
Jordan	0–4	China
Safa Abuganiya	0–1	Hou Yifan
Ebtsam Adee	0–1	Zhao Xue
Boshra Al-Shaeby	0–1	Huang Qian
Raya Al-Nuimat	0–1	Wang Yu
Uzbekistan	2–2	Vietnam
Nafisa Muminova	½–½	Hoàng Thị Bảo Trâm
Olga Sabirova	½–½	Nguyễn Thị Thanh An
Yulduz Hamrakulova	½–½	Nguyễn Thị Thanh An
Nodira Nodirjanova	½–½	Nguyễn Thị Mai Hưng
Iran	3½–½	Bangladesh
Atousa Pourkashian	1–0	Shamima Akter Liza
Mitra Hejazipour	1–0	Sharmin Sultana Shirin
Ghazal Hakimifard	½–½	Rani Hamid
Shayesteh Ghaderpour	1–0	Nazrana Khan Eva
Qatar	2–2	Turkmenistan
Zhu Chen	1–0	Mähri Geldiýewa
Salama Al-Khelaifi	0–1	Bahar Hallaýewa
Reem Safar	0–1	Maýsa Öwezowa
Kholoud Al-Khelaifi	1–0 WO	—
South Korea	1–3	Mongolia
Lim Hak-yung	0–1	Uuganbayaryn Lkhamsüren
Byun Sung-won	0–1	Tövshintögsiin Batchimeg
Kim Tae-gyeong	0–1	Altan-Ölziin Enkhtuul
Kim Hyo-young	1–0 WO	—

==== Summary ====
Rank	Team	Round							Total	GP	SB
Rank	Team	1	2	3	4	5	6	7	Total	GP	SB
1	China (CHN)	2	2	1	2	2	2	2	13	22	151½
2	India (IND)	2	2	1	2	2	2	2	13	21½	140½
3	Uzbekistan (UZB)	2	0	2	2	2	0	1	9	18½	119
4	Vietnam (VIE)	2	2	2	0	0	2	1	9	17	106
5	Iran (IRI)	2	0	0	2	0	2	2	8	18	97½
6	Mongolia (MGL)	0	2	0	2	0	1	2	7	12	47
7	Bangladesh (BAN)	2	0	2	0	2	0	0	6	13	66½
8	Qatar (QAT)	0	2	0	0	2	1	1	6	12½	44
9	Syria (SYR)	0	0	2	2	0	2	0	6	8½	23
10	Turkmenistan (TKM)	0	2	0	0	2	0	1	5	11½	50
11	South Korea (KOR)	0	0	2	0	0	0	0	2	7½	30
12	Jordan (JOR)	0	0	0	0	0	0	0	0	5	20½

=== Knockout round ===
Semifinals
1	China	3½
4	Vietnam	½
2	India	1½
3	Uzbekistan	2½

Gold medal match
1	China	2½
3	Uzbekistan	1½
Bronze medal match
4	Vietnam	2 (2)
2	India	2 (1)

==== Semifinals ====
	Score	
Vietnam	½–3½	China
Hoàng Thị Bảo Trâm	0–1	Hou Yifan
Phạm Lê Thảo Nguyên	½–½	Ju Wenjun
Nguyễn Thị Thanh An	0–1	Zhao Xue
Nguyễn Thị Mai Hưng	0–1	Huang Qian
India	1½–2½	Uzbekistan
Harika Dronavalli	1–0	Nafisa Muminova
Tania Sachdev	½–½	Olga Sabirova
Eesha Karavade	0–1	Yulduz Hamrakulova
Nisha Mohota	0–1	Nodira Nodirjanova

==== Bronze medal match ====
	Score	
Vietnam	2–2 (2–1)	India
Hoàng Thị Bảo Trâm	½–½	Harika Dronavalli
Phạm Lê Thảo Nguyên	½–½	Tania Sachdev
Nguyễn Thị Thanh An	1–0	Eesha Karavade
Nguyễn Thị Tường Vân	0–1	Nisha Mohota

- Vietnam and India had to go to the sudden death tie break match after both the teams score ended with 2 to 2 at the end of standard time control. The sudden death had to be introduced, which was played on three boards with 6 minutes for white & 5 minutes for black. Vietnam beat India 2–1 to win the Bronze medal.

==== Gold medal match ====
	Score	
China	2½–1½	Uzbekistan
Hou Yifan	1–0	Nafisa Muminova
Ju Wenjun	0–1	Olga Sabirova
Zhao Xue	1–0	Yulduz Hamrakulova
Huang Qian	½–½	Nodira Nodirjanova
