= Iraq at the 2010 Asian Games =

- IOC code: IRQ
- NOC: National Olympic Committee of Iraq

in Guangzhou
- Competitors: 42 in 12 sports
- Medals Ranked 32nd: Gold 0 Silver 1 Bronze 2 Total 3

Asian Games appearances (overview)
- 1974; 1978; 1982; 1986; 1990–2002; 2006; 2010; 2014; 2018; 2022; 2026

Iraq participated in the 16th Asian Games in Guangzhou from 12 November to 27 November 2010.

== Medalists ==
Medal	Name	Sport	Event	Date
Bronze	Ali Salman	Wrestling	Men's Greco-Roman 120 kg	23 November
Bronze	Haeider Hamarasheid	Rowing	Men's Single Sculls	19 November
Silver	Adnan Almntfage	Athletics	Men's 800m	25 November

== Archery ==
=== Women ===
Athlete	Event	Ranking Round		Round of 32	Round of 16	Quarterfinals	Semifinals	Final
Athlete	Event	Score	Seed	Opposition Score	Opposition Score	Opposition Score	Opposition Score	Opposition Score
Rand Almashhadani	Individual	1147	47th Q	Deepika Kumari (IND); L 1-5 (46-56, 49-49, 46-54)	did not advance			

== Athletics ==
=== Men ===
Track events

Event	Athletes	Heat Round 1		Semifinal		Final	
Event	Athletes	Result	Rank	Result	Rank	Result	Rank
100 m	Mohammed Aymen	10.83	6th	did not advance			
800 m	Adnan Almntfage	1:49.94 SB	1st QF			1:45.88 PB	2nd place, silver medalist(s)
1500 m	Adnan Almntfage	3:53.79	2nd QF			3:50.83	10th
4x400 m relay	Karar Alabboy; Mohammed Jumaah; Kareem Alnashi; Aymen Mohammed	DSQ				did not advance	

Field events

Event	Athletes	Qualification		Final	
Event	Athletes	Result	Rank	Result	Rank
Discus throw	Haider Jabreen			55.44	6th
Javelin throw	Ammar Alnajm			70.32 SB	11th

=== Women ===
Track events

Event	Athletes	Heat Round 1		Semifinal		Final	
Event	Athletes	Result	Rank	Result	Rank	Result	Rank
400 m	Danah Abdulrazzaq	56.35	5th			did not advance	
400 m	Gulustan Ieso	53.44 SB	6th			did not advance	
800 m	Inam Alsudani	2:09.62	4th			did not advance	
4x100 m relay	Danah Abdulrazzaq; Alaa Alqaysi; Inam Alsudani; Gulustan Ieso	47.46	5th			did not advance	
4x400 m relay	Danah Abdulrazzaq; Alaa Alqaysi; Inam Alsudani; Gulustan Ieso					3:45.44	5th

Combined events

Heptathlon
Event	Alaa Alqaysi		
Event	Results	Points	Rank
100 m hurdles	DNS		
High jump	DNS		
Shot put	DNS		
200 m	DNS		
Long jump	DNS		
Javelin throw	DNS		
800 m	DNS		
Final Total		DNS	

== Badminton ==
=== Men ===
Athlete	Event	Round of 32	Round of 16	Quarterfinals	Semifinals	Final
Athlete	Event	Opposition Score	Opposition Score	Opposition Score	Opposition Score	Opposition Score
Yara Azad	Singles	Hu Yun (CHN); L 0-2 (18-21, 9-21)	did not advance			

== Board games ==
=== Chess ===
Athlete	Event	Win	Draw	Lost	Points	Finals		Rank
Athlete	Event	Win	Draw	Lost	Points	Semifinal	Final	Rank
Mohammed Al-Saffar Araz Basim	Men's individual rapid	Abdul Rahman Ali (MDV); Murshed Niaz (BAN); Phommasone Khamphouth (JOR); Kohei Yamada (JPN)	0	Ni Hua (CHN); Ghaem Maghami Ehsan (IRI); Mok Tze-Meng (MAS); Shrestha Bilam Lal (NEP); Al-Zendani Zendan (YEM)	4.0			32nd
Ahmed Abdul Wahab	Men's individual rapid	Mohamed Hassan (MDV); Abdul Rahman Ali (MDV); Alshoha Basel (JOR); Mok Tze-Meng (MAS)	0	Murtas Kazhgaleyev (KAZ); Battulga Namkhai (MGL); Murshed Niaz (BAN); Al-Qudaimi Basheer (YEM); Lee Kiyul (KOR)	4.0			33rd
Mohammed Al-Saffar Araz Basim; Ahmed Abdul Wahab; Al-Ali Hussein Ali Hussein; Dhamir Jabar Al-Yahya	Men's team classical	Lebanon (LIB); 4.0-0.0; Mongolia (MGL); 2.5-1.5; Jordan (JOR); 3.0-1.0	BYE(Round3); 2.0	Philippines (PHI); 1.0-3.0; Yemen (YEM); 1.0-3.0; Iran (IRI); 0.5-3.5	7.0	did not advance		9th
Ibrahim Delbak Ismael	Women's individual rapid	Boshra Alshaeby (JOR); Asmita Adhikari (NEP); Bakri Alia Anin Azwa (MAS)	Fatemah Al-Jeldah (SYR); Mohammed Qane jannar Worya (IRQ)	Zhao Xue (CHN); Geldiyeva Mekhri (TKM); Nafisa Muminova (UZB); Shamima Akter Liza (BAN)	4.0			23rd
Mohammed Qane jannar Worya	Women's individual rapid	Kim Hyoyoung (KOR)	Salama Al-Khelaifi (QAT); Rayah Nuimat (JOR); Boshra Alshaeby (JOR); Ibrahim Delbak Ismael (IRQ); Nora Mohd Saleh (UAE)	Tania Sachdev (IND); Paridar Shadi (IRI); Narumi Uchida (JPN)	3.5			31st

== Boxing ==
Athlete	Event	Round of 32	Round of 16	Quarterfinals	Semifinals	Final
Athlete	Event	Opposition Result	Opposition Result	Opposition Result	Opposition Result	Opposition Result
Suraki Alwaaily	Men's Lightweight	BYE	Dorjnyambuu Otgondalai (MGL); L 7-16	did not advance		
Waheed Waheed	Men's Middleweight	BYE	Mohd Fairuz Azwan (MAS); W 12-5	Mohammad Sattarpour (IRI); L 5-8	did not advance	

== Cue Sports ==
Athlete	Event	Round of 64	Round of 32	Round of 16	Quarterfinals	Semifinals	Final
Athlete	Event	Opposition Result	Opposition Result	Opposition Result	Opposition Result	Opposition Result	Opposition Result
Ali Ali	Men's English Billiards Singles		BYE	Mohanna Al-Obaidly (QAT); L 0-3	did not advance		
Firas Alshamini	Men's Eight-ball Singles	BYE	Ko Pin-yi (TPE); L WO	did not advance			
Ayhab Nisuif	Men's Eight-ball Singles	BYE	Bashar Hussein (QAT); W 7-6	Kuo Po-cheng (TPE); L 2-7	did not advance		
Firas Alshamini	Men's Nine-ball singles	BYE	Nitiwat Kanjanasri (THA); L 2-9	did not advance			
Ayhab Nisuif	Men's Nine-ball singles	Surathep Phoochalam (THA); L 4-9	did not advance				
Ali Ali	Men's Snooker singles	Baek Min-Hu (KOR); L WO	did not advance				
Firas Alshamini	Men's Snooker singles	Fung Kwok Wai (HKG); L 2-4	did not advance				
Ayhab Nisuif; Ali Ali; Firas Alshamini	Men's Snooker team		BYE	Mongolia; W 3-0	Pakistan; L 0-3	did not advance	

== Gymnastics ==
=== Artistic gymnastics ===
Men
Individual Qualification & Team all-around Final

Athlete	Apparatus						Individual All-around	
Athlete	Floor	Pommel horse	Rings	Vault	Parallel bars	Horizontal bar	Total	Rank
Ali Altameemi	10.750	10.900		14.700	12.050		48.400	64th

== Judo ==
=== Men ===
Athlete	Event	Preliminary	Round of 16	Quarterfinals	Final of table	Final
Athlete	Event	Opposition Result	Opposition Result	Opposition Result	Opposition Result	Opposition Result
Ahmed Salman	-73 kg	did not start				
Hussein Alaameri	-60 kg	Rovshen Amandurdiyev (TKM); L 000-100	did not advance			

== Karate ==
=== Men ===
Athlete	Event	1/16 Finals	1/8 Finals	Quarterfinals	Semifinals	Finals
Athlete	Event	Opposition Result	Opposition Result	Opposition Result	Opposition Result	Opposition Result
Yasir Alhamada	Kumite -67kg	Lee Ji-Hwan (KOR); L 0-2	did not advance			
Saman Noori	Kumite -75kg	Hamad Al-Nweam (KUW); L 0-4	did not advance			
Kolnadar Aljaf	Kumite -84kg	BYE	Jang Min-Soo (KOR); L 0-2	did not advance		

== Rowing ==
Men

Athlete	Event	Heats		Repechage		Final	
Athlete	Event	Time	Rank	Time	Rank	Time	Rank
Haeider Nawzad	Single Sculls	7:12.02	2nd QF	auto advancement		7:10.10	3rd place, bronze medalist(s)
Hamzah Alhilfi; Mohammed Aljuboori; Ahmed Haily; Ahmed Zaidan	Lightweight Coxless Four	6:22.89	4th QF	auto advancement		6:27.05	5th

== Swimming ==
Men

Event	Athletes	Heat		Final	
Event	Athletes	Time	Rank	Time	Rank
1500 m freestyle	Ali Ali			18:36.33	12th

== Wrestling ==
=== Men ===
Freestyle

Athlete	Event	Round of 32	Round of 16	Quarterfinals	Semifinals	Final
Athlete	Event	Opposition Result	Opposition Result	Opposition Result	Opposition Result	Opposition Result
Ali Haqi	60 kg	BYE	Dauren Zhumagaziyev (KAZ); L PO 0-3	did not advance		
Husham Althaalebi	74 kg		Narsingh Pancham Yadav (IND); L PP 1-3	did not advance		
Mohammed Abdulmalek	120 kg		Satyendra Prasad Yadav (NEP); W ST 4-0	Nurzhan Katayev (KAZ); L PO 0-3	did not advance	

Greco-Roman

Athlete	Event	Round of 16	Quarterfinals	Semifinals	Final
Athlete	Event	Opposition Result	Opposition Result	Opposition Result	Opposition Result
Mohammed Alsaedi	55 kg	Margarito Angana (PHI); W VB 5-0	Ardiansyah (INA); W PO 3-0	Kanybek Zholchubekov (KGZ); L PP 1-3	Bronze medal match: Li Shujin (CHN); L PO 0-3
Hussein Shyaa	66 kg	Akhmad Kadyrov (TJK); W PP 3-1	Darkhan Bayakhmetov (KAZ); L PO 0-3	Repechage Round 1 match: Besiki Saldadze (UZB); L PO 0-3	did not advance
Ali Salman	120 kg	Kim Gwang-Seok (KOR); W PO 3-0	Amir Aliakbari (IRI); L PO 0-3	Repechage Round 1 match: BYE	Bronze medal match: Dharmender Dalal (IND); W P0 3-0 (bronze)
