= Chess at the 2010 Asian Games =

- Venue: Guangzhou Chess Institute
- Dates: 13–26 November 2010
- Competitors: 156 from 25 nations

Chess at the 2010 Asian Games was held in Guangzhou Chess Institute, Guangzhou, China from November 13 to 26, 2010 with four individual and team events.

China finished first in the medal table by winning three out of four possible gold medals.

== Schedule ==
| ● | Round | ● | Last round | S | Semifinals | F | Finals |

| Event↓/Date → | 13th Sat | 14th Sun | 15th Mon | 16th Tue | 17th Wed | 18th Thu | 19th Fri | 20th Sat | 21st Sun | 22nd Mon | 23rd Tue | 24th Wed | 25th Thu | 26th Fri |
|---|---|---|---|---|---|---|---|---|---|---|---|---|---|---|
| Men's individual rapid | ●● | ●● | ●●● | ●● | | | | | | | | | | |
| Men's team standard | | | | | | ● | ● | ● | ● | ● | ● | ● | S | F |
| Women's individual rapid | ●● | ●● | ●●● | ●● | | | | | | | | | | |
| Women's team standard | | | | | | ● | ● | ● | ● | ● | ● | ● | S | F |

== Medalists ==
| Event | Gold | Silver | Bronze |
|---|---|---|---|
| Men's individual rapid | Rustam Kasimdzhanov; Uzbekistan | Lê Quang Liêm; Vietnam | Bu Xiangzhi; China |
| Men's team standard | China; Wang Yue; Wang Hao; Bu Xiangzhi; Zhou Jianchao; Ni Hua | Philippines; Wesley So; Rogelio Antonio; John Paul Gomez; Darwin Laylo; Eugene Torre | India; Pentala Harikrishna; Krishnan Sasikiran; Surya Shekhar Ganguly; Geetha Narayanan Gopal; Adhiban Baskaran |
| Women's individual rapid | Hou Yifan; China | Zhao Xue; China | Harika Dronavalli; India |
| Women's team standard | China; Hou Yifan; Ju Wenjun; Zhao Xue; Huang Qian; Wang Yu | Uzbekistan; Nafisa Muminova; Olga Sabirova; Yulduz Hamrakulova; Nodira Nodirjanova | Vietnam; Hoàng Thị Bảo Trâm; Phạm Lê Thảo Nguyên; Nguyễn Thị Thanh An; Nguyễn Thị Mai Hưng; Nguyễn Thị Tường Vân |

== Medal table ==
| Rank | Nation | Gold | Silver | Bronze | Total |
|---|---|---|---|---|---|
| 1 | China (CHN) | 3 | 1 | 1 | 5 |
| 2 | Uzbekistan (UZB) | 1 | 1 | 0 | 2 |
| 3 | Vietnam (VIE) | 0 | 1 | 1 | 2 |
| 4 | Philippines (PHI) | 0 | 1 | 0 | 1 |
| 5 | India (IND) | 0 | 0 | 2 | 2 |
| Totals (5 entries) | | 4 | 4 | 4 | 12 |

== Participating nations ==
A total of 156 athletes from 25 nations competed in chess at the 2010 Asian Games:

- Bangladesh (10)
- China (10)
- India (10)
- Indonesia (2)
- Iran (10)
- Iraq (6)
- Japan (3)
- Jordan (10)
- Kazakhstan (7)
- Kyrgyzstan (5)
- Laos (1)
- Lebanon (3)
- Malaysia (3)
- Maldives (6)
- Mongolia (6)
- Nepal (4)
- Philippines (5)
- Qatar (9)
- South Korea (10)
- Syria (4)
- Turkmenistan (5)
- United Arab Emirates (4)
- Uzbekistan (8)
- Vietnam (10)
- Yemen (5)
