= FIDE Women's Grand Prix 2013–14 =

Women's chess tournament series

The FIDE Women's Grand Prix 2013–14 was a series of six chess tournaments exclusively for women, which formed part of the qualification cycle for the Women's World Chess Championship 2015. The winner of the Grand Prix was decided in the last stage in Sharjah, UAE, when rating favorite and reigning world champion Hou Yifan overtook second seeded Koneru Humpy to win her third straight Grand Prix cycle. For the third time running, Koneru Humpy finished runner-up to Hou Yifan.

With the overall win Hou Yifan earned the right to play the Women's World Chess Championship 2016 in a ten-game match.

== Format ==
Eighteen women players were to be selected to compete in these tournaments. Each player agrees and will contract to participate in exactly four of these tournaments. Players must rank their preference of tournaments once the final list of host cities is announced and the dates are allocated to each host city.

Each tournament is a 12-player, single round-robin tournament. In each round players scored 1 point for a win, ½ point for a draw and 0 for a loss. Grand prix points were then allocated according to each player's standing in the tournament: 160 grand prix points for first place, 130 for second place, 110 for third place, and then 90 down to 10 points by steps of 10. In case of a tie in points the grand prix points are shared evenly by the tied players. Players only counted their best three tournament results. The player with the most grand prix points is the winner.

== Players and qualification ==
Players invited bases on qualifying criteria were:

- The four semi-finalists of the Women's World Chess Championship 2012:
1. (Ukraine) Anna Ushenina
2. (Bulgaria) Antoaneta Stefanova
3. (China) Ju Wenjun
4. (India) Dronavalli Harika
- The six highest ranked players (average of nine FIDE World Rankings lists from March 2012 to January 2013):

(Hungary) Judit Polgár (declined)

1. (China) Hou Yifan
2. (India) Koneru Humpy
3. (Slovenia) Anna Muzychuk
4. (China) Zhao Xue
5. (Georgia (country)) Nana Dzagnidze
6. (Ukraine) Kateryna Lahno
- Six organizer nominees:
1. (Russia) Alexandra Kosteniuk (of Geneva)
2. (Armenia) Elina Danielian (of Dilijan)
3. (Uzbekistan) Nafisa Muminova (of Tashkent)
4. (Russia) Olga Girya (of Khanty-Mansiysk)
5. (Georgia (country)) Bela Khotenashvili (of Tbilisi)
6. (Mongolia) Batchimeg Tuvshintugs (of Erdenet)
- Two FIDE president nominees:
1. (Russia) Nadezhda Kosintseva (withdrew)
2. (Lithuania) Viktorija Čmilytė
- Replacements:
1. (Russia) Tatiana Kosintseva

== Prize money and Grand Prix points ==
The prize money has been increased from €40,000 to €60,000 per single Grand Prix and from €60,000 to €90,000 for the overall Grand Prix finishes.

Place	Single Grand Prix event	Overall standings	Grand Prix points
1	€10,000	€25,000	160
2	€8,250	€20,000	130
3	€6,750	€15,000	110
4	€5,750	€10,000	90
5	€5,000	€7,500	80
6	€4,500	€5,500	70
7	€4,250	€4,000	60
8	€4,000	€3,000	50
9	€3,250	–	40
10	€3,000	–	30
11	€2,750	–	20
12	€2,500	–	10

== Tie breaks ==
With the objective of determining a clear, single winner to play in the Challenger Match and in the case that two or more players have equal cumulative points at the top, the following criteria (in descending order) will be utilized to decide the overall winner:

1. Fourth result not already taken in the top three results.
2. Number of actual game result points scored in the four tournaments.
3. Number of first places (in case of a tie – points given accordingly).
4. Number of second places (in case of a tie – points given accordingly).
5. Number of wins.
6. Drawing of lots.

== Schedule ==
The fifth stage was moved from Tbilisi to Lopota. The sixth stage was moved from Erdenet, Mongolia to Sharjah, UAE, the world's largest chess club. A move apparently due to illness in the Mongolian organising committee.

The six tournaments were:

No.	Host city	Date	Winner	Points (Win/draw/loss)
1	Geneva, Switzerland	2–16 May 2013	Bela Khotenashvili (GEO)	8/11 (+7=2–2)
2	Dilijan, Armenia	15–29 June 2013	Koneru Humpy (IND)	8/11 (+5=6–0)
3	Tashkent, Uzbekistan	17 September – 1 October 2013	Koneru Humpy (IND)	8/11 (+6=4–1)
4	Khanty-Mansiysk, Russia	8–22 April 2014	Hou Yifan (CHN)	8.5/11 (+6=5–0)
5	Lopota Resort, Georgia	18 June – 2 July 2014	Hou Yifan (CHN)	9/11 (+7=4-0)
6	Sharjah, United Arab Emirates	24 August – 7 September 2014	Ju Wenjun (CHN) and Hou Yifan (CHN)	8.5/11 (+6=5-0)

== Events crosstables ==
=== Geneva 2013 ===
1st stage, Geneva, Switzerland, 2–16 May 2013
	Player	Rating	1	2	3	4	5	6	7	8	9	10	11	12	Pts	H2H	Wins	SB	TPR	GP	Rating change
1	Bela Khotenashvili (GEO)	2505	X	½	0	1	1	½	1	0	1	1	1	1	8.0	0	7	39.75	2681	160	+26
2	Anna Muzychuk (SLO)	2585	½	X	1	½	½	½	½	1	½	½	1	1	7.5	0	4	37.75	2636	130	+8
3	Tatiana Kosintseva (RUS)	2517	1	0	X	½	0	½	1	½	½	1	½	1	6.5	0.5	4	33.00	2573	100	+9
4	Nana Dzagnidze (GEO)	2545	0	½	½	X	1	½	0	1	½	½	1	1	6.5	0.5	4	31.25	2571	100	+5
5	Ju Wenjun (CHN)	2544	0	½	1	0	X	1	½	½	0	½	1	1	6.0	1	4	29.25	2540	75	+0
6	Anna Ushenina (UKR)	2491	½	½	½	½	0	X	½	1	1	½	½	½	6.0	0	2	32.00	2543	75	+8
7	Kateryna Lagno (UKR)	2548	0	½	0	1	½	½	X	0	1	½	½	1	5.5	0	3	27.25	2508	60	−6
8	Hou Yifan (CHN)	2617	1	0	½	0	½	0	1	X	½	1	0	½	5.0	0.5	3	27.75	2470	45	−22
9	Alexandra Kosteniuk (RUS)	2491	0	½	½	½	1	0	0	½	X	½	1	½	5.0	0.5	2	25.50	2481	45	−2
10	Viktorija Cmilyte (LTU)	2522	0	½	0	½	½	½	½	0	½	X	½	1	4.5	0	1	22.00	2446	30	−12
11	Batchimeg Tuvshintugs (MGL)	2298	0	0	½	0	0	½	½	1	0	½	X	½	3.5	0	1	17.25	2397	20	+18
12	Olga Girya (RUS)	2463	0	0	0	0	0	½	0	½	½	0	½	X	2.0	0	0	9.75	2254	10	−27

Bela Khotenashvili won the first Grand Prix in Geneva and also won her third Grandmaster norm.

=== Dilijan 2013 ===
2nd stage, Dilijan, Armenia, 15–29 June 2013
	Player	Rating	1	2	3	4	5	6	7	8	9	10	11	12	Pts	H2H	Wins	SB	TPR	GP
1	Humpy Koneru (IND)	2597	X	1	½	1	½	1	1	½	½	½	1	½	8.0	0	5	42.75	2667	160
2	Anna Muzychuk (SLO)	2593	0	X	1	1	½	½	1	½	½	½	1	½	7.0	1	4	36.75	2594	120
3	Nana Dzagnidze (GEO)	2550	0	½	X	0	½	½	1	1	1	1	½	1	7.0	0	5	34.50	2598	120
4	Tatiana Kosintseva (RUS)	2526	0	0	1	X	0	0	1	1	½	1	½	1	6.0	0	5	30.00	2534	90
5	Anna Ushenina (UKR)	2499	½	½	½	1	X	½	½	½	½	½	0	½	5.5	0	1	31.00	2505	80
6	Antoaneta Stefanova (BUL)	2531	0	0	½	1	½	X	½	½	1	0	½	½	5.0	1	2	26.00	2471	60
7	Batchimeg Tuvshintugs (MGL)	2316	0	½	0	0	½	½	X	½	1	1	½	½	5.0	1	2	24.50	2490	60
8	Dronavalli Harika (IND)	2492	½	½	0	0	½	½	½	X	½	½	1	½	5.0	1	1	26.25	2474	60
9	Olga Girya (RUS)	2436	½	½	0	½	½	0	0	½	X	½	1	½	4.5	1.5	1	24.50	2447	30
10	Viktorija Cmilyte (LTU)	2511	½	0	0	0	1	1	0	½	½	X	½	½	4.5	1	2	23.50	2440	30
11	Elina Danielian (ARM)	2475	0	½	½	½	½	½	½	0	0	½	X	1	4.5	0.5	1	24.00	2444	30
12	Bela Khotenashvili (GEO)	2531	½	½	0	0	½	½	½	½	½	½	0	X	4.0	0	0	22.25	2405	10

=== Tashkent 2013 ===
3rd stage, Tashkent, Uzbekistan, 17 September – 1 October 2013
	Player	Rating	1	2	3	4	5	6	7	8	9	10	11	12	Pts	SB	TPR	GP
1	Humpy Koneru (IND)	2607	X	0	½	½	1	1	1	½	1	½	1	1	8.0	39.25	2637	160
2	Bela Khotenashvili (GEO)	2514	1	X	½	0	1	0	0	1	½	1	1	1	7.0	35.00	2572	120
3	Kateryna Lagno (UKR)	2532	½	½	X	½	0	½	1	½	1	1	½	1	7.0	34.50	2571	120
4	Dronavalli Harika (IND)	2475	½	1	½	X	0	½	0	1	1	½	1	½	6.5	34.00	2543	85
5	Zhao Xue (CHN)	2533	0	0	1	1	X	0	1	1	0	1	1	½	6.5	32.75	2533	85
6	Ju Wenjun (CHN)	2535	0	1	½	½	1	X	½	½	½	1	0	½	6.0	33.50	2505	70
7	Alexandra Kosteniuk (RUS)	2495	0	1	0	1	0	½	X	0	½	½	1	1	5.5	25.75	2477	55
8	Olga Girya (RUS)	2439	½	0	½	0	0	½	1	X	½	½	1	1	5.5	25.25	2482	55
9	Elina Danielian (ARM)	2470	0	½	0	0	1	½	½	½	X	½	½	1	5.0	23.75	2448	40
10	Antoaneta Stefanova (BUL)	2496	½	0	0	½	0	0	½	½	½	X	1	1	4.5	19.75	2413	30
11	Nafisa Muminova (UZB)	2293	0	0	½	0	0	1	0	0	½	0	X	1	3.0	13.50	2325	20
12	Guliskhan Nakhbayeva (KAZ)	2307	0	0	0	½	½	½	0	0	0	0	0	X	1.5	9.50	2173	10

=== Khanty-Mansiyk 2014 ===
4th stage, Khanty-Mansiysk, Russia, 8–22 April 2014
	Player	Rating	1	2	3	4	5	6	7	8	9	10	11	12	Pts	SB	TPR	GP
1	Hou Yifan (CHN)	2618	X	1	½	½	½	1	½	½	1	1	1	1	8.5	43.00	2695	160
2	Olga Girya (RUS)	2450	0	X	1	0	1	1	½	1	½	½	1	½	7.0	35.50	2602	130
3	Alexandra Kosteniuk (RUS)	2527	½	0	X	½	1	1	½	½	½	1	0	1	6.5	34.00	2558	110
4	Kateryna Lagno (UKR)	2543	½	1	½	X	½	½	½	0	1	½	½	½	6.0	33.50	2527	85
5	Anna Muzychuk (SLO)	2560	½	0	0	½	X	½	½	1	½	1	½	1	6.0	29.50	2526	85
6	Nana Dzagnidze (GEO)	2550	0	0	0	½	½	X	1	0	½	1	1	1	5.5	25.00	2491	65
7	Antoaneta Stefanova (BUL)	2489	½	½	½	½	½	0	X	0	1	1	½	½	5.5	29.50	2496	65
8	Zhao Xue (CHN)	2552	½	0	½	1	0	1	1	X	½	0	½	0	5.0	28.75	2454	45
9	Anna Ushenina (UKR)	2501	0	½	½	0	½	½	0	½	X	1	1	½	5.0	24.25	2459	40
10	Nafisa Muminova (UZB)	2321	0	0	1	½	½	0	½	½	0	X	1	1	4.0	18.50	2409	30
11	Tatiana Kosintseva (RUS)	2496	0	0	1	½	½	0	½	½	0	0	X	½	3.5	19.50	2363	15
12	Batchimeg Tuvshintugs (MGL)	2340	0	½	0	½	0	0	½	1	½	0	½	X	3.5	18.50	2377	15

Olga Girya achieved a GM norm at the tournament.

=== Lopota 2014 ===
5th stage, Lopota, Georgia, 19 June – July 1, 2014
	Player	Rating	1	2	3	4	5	6	7	8	9	10	11	12	Pts	H2H	Victories	SB	TPR	GP
1	Hou Yifan (CHN)	2629	X	1	½	1	1	½	1	½	½	1	1	1	9.0	0	7	45.00	2773	160
2	Ju Wenjun (CHN)	2532	0	X	1	½	1	½	1	½	1	½	0	1	7.0	1	5	34.75	2622	120
3	Elina Danielian (ARM)	2460	½	0	X	½	½	½	1	1	0	1	½	1	7.0	0	4	34.00	2628	120
4	Nana Dzagnidze (GEO)	2541	0	½	½	X	0	½	½	1	½	1	1	1	6.5	0	4	29.00	2584	90
5	Antoaneta Stefanova (BUL)	2488	0	0	½	1	X	½	½	0	1	1	½	1	6.0	0.5	4	27.75	2560	75
6	Harika Dronavalli (IND)	2503	½	½	½	½	½	X	½	0	1	½	½	1	6.0	0.5	2	30.75	2558	75
7	Anna Muzychuk (UKR)	2561	0	0	0	½	½	½	X	½	1	½	1	1	5.5	1.5	3	23.75	2517	50
8	Koneru Humpy (IND)	2613	½	½	0	0	1	1	½	X	½	½	0	1	5.5	1.0	3	28.75	2512	50
9	Alexandra Kosteniuk (RUS)	2532	½	1	½	½	0	0	0	½	X	½	1	1	5.5	0.5	3	27.25	2520	50
10	Zhao Xue (CHN)	2538	0	0	0	0	0	½	½	½	½	X	½	1	3.5	0	1	14.25	2386	30
11	Bela Khotenashvili (GEO)	2518	0	½	0	0	0	0	0	1	0	1	X	½	3.0	0	1	16.75	2346	20
12	Nafisa Muminova (UZB)	2332	0	½	0	0	0	0	0	0	0	0	1	X	1.5	0	1	6.50	2229	10

Ju Wenjun achieved another GM norm which makes it her final GM norm.

=== Sharjah 2014 ===
6th stage, Sharjah, United Arab Emirates, 24 August – 7 September 2014
	Player	Rating	1	2	3	4	5	6	7	8	9	10	11	12	Pts	Rating change	TPR	GP
1	Ju Wenjun (CHN)	2559	X	½	½	1	½	1	½	1	½	1	1	1	8.5	+19	2696	145
2	Hou Yifan (CHN)	2661	½	X	½	½	1	½	1	½	1	1	1	1	8.5	+4	2687	145
3	Harika Dronavalli (IND)	2521	0	½	X	½	½	1	½	1	0	½	1	1	6.5	+5	2551	87.5
4	Zhao Xue (CHN)	2508	0	½	½	X	½	½	1	0	½	1	1	1	6.5	+7	2552	87.5
5	Anna Ushenina (UKR)	2487	½	0	½	½	X	½	½	1	1	½	½	1	6.5	+11	2554	87.5
6	Batchimeg Tuvshintugs (MGL)	2346	½	½	0	½	½	X	1	½	½	1	½	1	6.5	+64	2567	87.5
7	Koneru Humpy (IND)	2598	½	0	½	½	½	0	X	1	1	½	½	1	6	-17	2481	60
8	Elina Danielian (ARM)	2490	0	½	0	1	0	½	0	X	½	1	1	½	5	-5	2459	50
9	Tatiana Kosintseva (RUS)	2494	½	0	½	1	½	0	½	½	X	0	½	1	4.5	-10	2427	40
10	Zhu Chen (QAT)	2461	0	0	½	0	½	0	½	0	1	X	½	½	3.5	-15	2361	30
11	Nafisa Muminova (UZB)	2315	0	0	½	0	½	½	½	0	½	½	X	½	3.0	+2	2336	20
12	Alina l'Ami (ROU)	2446	0	0	0	0	0	0	0	½	0	½	½	X	1.5	-33	2174	10

Batchimeg Tuvshintugs achieved a 9-game GM norm, her first one.

== Grand Prix standings ==
The lowest of four results is in italics and not taken into the total result. Khotenashvili took the lead after stage one, then Koneru Humpy went into the lead by winning two stages in a row. Hou Yifan then overtook the lead of Koneru Humpy at the last stage.

The top two places are the same as in the two previous Grand Prix cycles.

	Player	July 2014 Rating	Geneva	Dilijan	Tashkent	Khanty-Mansiysk	Lopota	Sharjah	Played	Best 3
1	Hou Yifan (CHN)	2629	45			160	160	145	4	465
2	Koneru Humpy (IND)	2613		160	160		50	60	4	380
3	Ju Wenjun (CHN)	2538	75		70		120	145	4	340
4	Anna Muzychuk (SLO)	2561	130	120		85	50		4	335
5	Nana Dzagnidze (GEO)	2541	100	120		65	90		4	310
6	Bela Khotenashvili (GEO)	2518	160	10	120		20		4	300
7	Kateryna Lahno (RUS)^{[4]}^{[5]}	2540	60		120	85			3	265
8	Dronavalli Harika (IND)	2513		60	85		75	87.5	4	247.5
9	Anna Ushenina (UKR)	2488	75	80		45		87.5	4	242.5
10	Tatiana Kosintseva (RUS)^{[1]}	2476	100	90		15		40	4	230
11	Zhao Xue (CHN)	2542			85	45	30	87.5	4	217.5
12	Alexandra Kosteniuk (RUS)^{[4]}	2533	45		55	110	50		4	215
12	Olga Girya (RUS)	2493	10	30	55	130			4	215
14	Elina Danielian (ARM)^{[3]}	2458		30	40		120	50	4	210
15	Antoaneta Stefanova (BUL)^{[3]}	2488		60	30	65	75		4	200
16	Batchimeg Tuvshintugs (MGL)	2346	20	60		15		87.5	4	167.5
17	Nafisa Muminova (UZB)	2332			20	30	10	20	4	70
18	Viktorija Cmilyte (LTU)^{[2]}^{[5]}	2525	30	30					2	60
19	Zhu Chen (QAT)^{[5]}	2461						30	1	30
20	Guliskhan Nakhbayeva (KAZ)^{[2]}	2300			10				1	10
20	Alina L'Ami (ROU)^{[5]}	2446						10	1	10

Notes

- ^{1} Nadezhda Kosintseva withdrew from the Women's Grand Prix and she has been replaced by the next highest rating reserve, Tatiana Kosintseva.
- ^{2} Viktorija Cmilyte withdrew her participation in Tashkent due to illness and was replaced by Guliskhan Nakhbayeva.
- ^{3} Antoaneta Stefanova replaced Elina Danielian in Khanty-Mansiysk.
- ^{4} Alexandra Kosteniuk and Kateryna Lahno swapped places at fifth and sixth stage.
- ^{5} Viktorija Cmilyte and Kateryna Lahno were replaced by Alina L'Ami and Zhu Chen at the sixth stage.

== See also ==
- FIDE Women's Grand Prix 2011–12, the previous cycle
- FIDE Women's Grand Prix 2015–16, the next cycle
