= Jordan at the 2010 Asian Games =

- IOC code: JOR
- NOC: Jordan Olympic Committee

in Guangzhou
- Medals Ranked 20th: Gold 2 Silver 2 Bronze 2 Total 6

Asian Games appearances (overview)
- 1986; 1990; 1994; 1998; 2002; 2006; 2010; 2014; 2018; 2022; 2026

Jordan participated in the 16th Asian Games in Guangzhou, China, from 12 to 27 November 2010. It won 2 gold, 2 silver and 2 bronze medals.

== Medalist ==
Medal	Name	Sport	Event	Date
Gold	Nabil Hassan	Taekwondo	Men's Under 80kg	18 November
Gold	Manar Shath	Karate	Women's +68 kg	25 November
Silver	Dana Touran	Taekwondo	Women's Under 46kg	17 November
Silver	Bashar Al Najjar	Karate	Men's -60 kg	25 November
Bronze	Nadin Dawani	Taekwondo	Women's +83kg	20 November
Bronze	Mutasembellah Khair	Karate	Men's 84kg	26 November

== Basketball ==
=== Men ===
Team

Mahd Abdeen
Khaldoon Abu Ruqayah
Abdallah Abuqoura
Nedal Al Sharif
Ahmad Alhmaraheh
Fadel Al-Najjar
Ali El Zubi
Mohammad Hadrab
Mohammad Hussein
Faisal Khair
Malek Khashan
Ali Jamal Zaghab

Preliminary round

Group E

Team	Pld	W	L	PF	PA	PD	Pts
China	5	5	0	462	258	+204	10
South Korea	5	4	1	475	311	+164	9
Jordan	5	3	2	339	403	−64	8
North Korea	5	2	3	377	421	−44	7
Mongolia	5	1	4	310	438	−128	6
Uzbekistan	5	0	5	283	415	−132	5

November 16
21:30

Jordan	90–80	North Korea
Scoring by quarter: 24–26, 23–13, 19–13, 24–28
Pts: Abu-Qoura 25; Rebs: Abu-Qoura 10; Asts: Abu-Qoura 3		Pts: Pak M.J. 27; Rebs: Kim U.C. 8 Asts: Pak U.C. 4

International Sports Arena, Guangzhou
Referees: Yasser Abbas (QAT), Prakash Sandou (IND), Naohiko Uchihara (JPN)

November 17
21:30

South Korea	95–49	Jordan
Scoring by quarter: 28–16, 25–12, 20–12, 22–9
Pts: Kim J.S., Lee S.J. 14; Rebs: Oh S.K. 8 Asts: Park C.H. 7		Pts: Hadrab 19; Rebs: Zaghab 6 Asts: Five players 1

International Sports Arena, Guangzhou
Referees: Eddie Viator (FRA), Yasser Abbas (QAT), Ferdinand Pascual (PHI)

November 19
19:15

Jordan	79–64	Mongolia
Scoring by quarter: 17–14, 18–9, 19–25, 25–16
Pts: Zaghab 17; Rebs: Zaghab 19; Asts: Abdeen 6		Pts: Otgonmunkh, Sanchir 12; Rebs: Munkhbold 6 Asts: Battur 4

Ying Dong Gymnasium, Guangzhou
Referees: Ferdinand Pascual (PHI), Teerapong Yodsint (THA), Prakash Sandou (IND)

November 21
21:30

Uzbekistan	63–68 (OT)	Jordan
Scoring by quarter: 7–15, 15–20, 23–13, 12–9, Overtime: 6–11
Pts: Juginisov 14; Rebs: Juginisov 12; Asts: Denisov 5		Pts: Abu-Qoura 19; Rebs: Abu-Qoura 10; Asts: Abdeen 4

International Sports Arena, Guangzhou
Referees: Wu Ying-wei (TPE), Naohiko Uchihara (JPN), Teerapong Yodsint (THA)

November 22
19:15

China	101–53	Jordan
Scoring by quarter: 26–8, 21–7, 28–17, 26–21
Pts: Zhang Q.P. 31; Rebs: Tang Z.D. 12; Asts: Zhang B. 6		Pts: Zaghab 19; Rebs: Zaghab 8 Asts: Abu-Qoura, Abdeen 2

International Sports Arena, Guangzhou
Referees: Eddie Viator (FRA), Prakash Sandou (IND), Ferdinand Pascual (PHI)

Quarterfinals

November 24
19:15

Iran	67–43	Jordan
Scoring by quarter: 20–11, 12–6, 16–16, 19–10
Pts: Afagh 17; Rebs: Kardoust 15; Asts: Kamrani 3		Pts: Abu-Qoura 11; Rebs: Abu-Qoura 8 Asts: Four players 1

Huangpu Gymnasium, Guangzhou
Referees: Borys Shulga (UKR), Wu Ying-wei (TPE), Ramesh Kumar (IND)

Placings 5th–8th

November 25
16:30

Jordan	52–60	Qatar
Scoring by quarter: 21–16, 10–17, 13–9, 8–18
Pts: Al-Sharif 11; Rebs: Abu-Qoura 7 Asts: Abu-Qoura 7		Pts: Suliman 14; Rebs: Ahmad 7 Asts: Musa 3

Ying Dong Gymnasium, Guangzhou
Referees: Eddie Viator (FRA), Naohiko Uchihara (JPN), Wang Mei (CHN)

Placings 7th–8th

November 26
14:15

North Korea	74–79	Jordan
Scoring by quarter: 19–23, 7–20, 29–14, 19–22
Pts: Sin K.B. 18; Rebs: Pak U.C. 6 Asts: Kye H.U. 7		Pts: Abu-Qoura 20; Rebs: Abu-Qoura 13; Asts: Al-Sharif, Abu-Qoura 4

Ying Dong Gymnasium, Guangzhou
Referees: Ferdinand Pascual (PHI), Fong Kin Lung (HKG), Song Yanping (CHN)

== Boxing ==
Athlete	Event	Round of 32	Round of 16	Quarterfinals	Semifinals	Final
Athlete	Event	Opposition Result	Opposition Result	Opposition Result	Opposition Result	Opposition Result
Mohammad Al-Wadi	Men's Flyweight	Sultan Al-Montashari (KSA); W 10-2	Pak Jong-Chol (PRK); L 2-10	did not advance		
Mahmoud Eshaish	Men's Lightweight	BYE	Samat Bashenov (KAZ); L 3-8	did not advance		
Ahmad Teimat	Men's Light heavyweight		Ehsan Rouzbahani (IRI); L 2-9	did not advance		

== Board games ==
=== Chess ===
Athlete	Event	Round 1	Round 2	Round 3	Round 4	Round 5	Round 6	Round 7	Round 8	Round 9	Win	Draw	Lost	Points	Rank
Athlete	Event	Opposition Result	Opposition Result	Opposition Result	Opposition Result	Opposition Result	Opposition Result	Opposition Result	Opposition Result	Opposition Result	Win	Draw	Lost	Points	Rank
Fadi Malkawi	Men's Individual Rapid	Salem Saleh (UAE); L	Minhazuddin Ahmed (BAN); L	Abdul Rahman Ali (MDV); L	Hani Mikati (LIB); D	Khamphouth Phommasone (LAO); W	Algis Shukuraliev (KGZ); L	Kohei Yamada (JPN); D	Mohamed Hassan (MDV); W	Semetey Tologontegin (KGZ); L	2	2	5	3.0	41st
Basel Al-Shoha	Men's Individual Rapid	Rogelio Antonio (PHI); L	Namkhai Battulga (MGL); L	Mohamed Hassan (MDV); W	Handszar Odeev (TKM); W	Amanmurad Kakageldiyev (TKM); L	Samir Mohammad (SYR); D	Algis Shukuraliev (KGZ); L	Ahmed Abdul-Sattar (IRQ); L	Lee Ki-Yul (KOR); L	2	1	5	2.5	43rd
Raya Al-Nuimat	Women's Individual Rapid	Nodira Nodirjanova (UZB); L	Kholoud Al-Zarouni (UAE); L	Salama Al-Khelaifi (QAT); L	Kim Hyo-Young (KOR); W	Monalisa Khamboo (NEP); W	Jannar Worya (IRQ); D	Alia Anin Bakri (MAS); L	Moomina Mohamed (MDV); W	Boshra Al-Shaeby (JOR); D	3	2	4	4.0	27th
Boshra Al-Shaeby	Women's Individual Rapid	Hoang Thi Bao Tram (VIE); L	Delbak Ismael (IRQ); L	Moomina Mohamed (MDV); W	Sharmin Sultana Shirin (BAN); L	Alia Anin Bakri (MAS); L	Nusra Abdul Rahman (MDV); W	Jannar Worya (IRQ); D	Byun Sung-Won (KOR); W	Raya Al-Nuimat (JOR); D	3	2	4	4.0	28th

Athlete	Event	Round 1	Round 2	Round 3	Round 4	Round 5	Round 6	Round 7	Points	Rank	Semifinal	Final
Athlete	Event	Opposition Result	Opposition Result	Opposition Result	Opposition Result	Opposition Result	Opposition Result	Opposition Result	Points	Rank	Opposition Result	Opposition Result
Marwan Aboudi; Fadi Malkawi; Basel Al-Shoha; Al Khatib Ahmed; Mousa Hussain	Men's Team Classical	Vietnam (VIE); 0.5-3.5	South Korea (KOR); 0.5-3.5	Mongolia (MGL); 1.5-2.5	BYE; 2.0	Yemen (YEM); 0.5-3.5	Maldives (MDV); 3.0-1.0	Iraq (IRQ); 1.0-3.0	9.0	16th	did not advance	
Raya Al-Nuimat; Boshra Al-Shaeby; Adee Ebtsam; Abuganiya Safa; Tamara Khateeb	Women's Team Classical	Bangladesh (BAN); 0.0-4.0	Qatar (QAT); 0.0-4.0	South Korea (KOR); 1.5-2.5	Mongolia (MGL); 1.0-3.0	Turkmenistan (TKM); 1.5-2.5	Syria (SYR); 1.0-3.0	China (CHN); 0.0-4.0	5.0	12th	did not advance	

== Fencing ==
=== Men ===
Event	Athlete	Round of Poules		Round of 32	Round of 16	Quarterfinals	Semifinals	Final
Event	Athlete	Result	Seed	Opposition Score	Opposition Score	Opposition Score	Opposition Score	Opposition Score
Fahed Abu-Assaf	Individual épée	1 W - 5 L	29th	did not advance				
Fahed Abu-Assaf	Individual foil	3 W - 3 L	14th Q	Sinatrio Raharjo (INA); W 15-14	Lei Sheng (CHN); L 6-15	did not advance		

== Football ==
=== Men ===
Team

Mohammad Abu Khousa
Ahmad Abu Samrah
Khaldoun Al-Kizam
Yusuf Al-Naber
Mohammad Mustafa
Anas Al-Jbarat
Saleh Al-Jawhari
Ahmad All
Yasser Al-Rawashdeh
Yusuf Al-Thudan
Khalil Bani Attiah
Mohammad Fatma
Zaid Jaber
Yusuf Al-Rawashdeh
Feras Saleh
Ahmad Shaalan
Mohammad Omar Shishani
Oday Zahran
Mahmoud Za'tara
Ibrahim Al-Zawahreh

Pool matches

Group C

Pos	Team	Pld	W	D	L	GF	GA	GD	Pts
1	North Korea	3	3	0	0	7	0	+7	9
2	South Korea	3	2	0	1	7	1	+6	6
3	Palestine	3	0	1	2	0	6	−6	1
4	Jordan	3	0	1	2	0	7	−7	1

Source: RSSSF
November 8
19:00

Palestine	0 – 0	Jordan
	Report

Yingdong Stadium, Guangzhou
Referee: Banjar Al-Dosari (Qatar)

November 10
16:00

South Korea	4 – 0	Jordan
Koo Ja-Cheol 21', 44'; Kim Bo-Kyung 46'; Cho Young-Cheol 78'	Report

Yuexiushan Stadium, Guangzhou
Referee: Tayeb Shamsuzzaman (Bangladesh)

November 13
16:00

Jordan	0 – 3	North Korea
	Report	Kim Yong-Jun 17'; Choe Myong-Ho 81' (pen.); Choe Kum-Chol 85'

Yingdong Stadium, Guangzhou
Referee: Valentin Kovalenko (Uzbekistan)

=== Women ===
Team

Alaa Abu Kasheh
Farah Al Badarneh
Ayah Al-Majali
Farah Alazab
Enshirah Al-Hyasat
Manal Almanasreh
Stephanie Al-Naber
Abeer Al-Nahar
Ala Alqraini
Maysa Jbarah
Shahnaz Jebreen
Yasmeen Khair
Sama'a Khraisat
Zaina Petro
Misda Ramounieh
Shorooq Shathli
Mira Zakaria

Pool matches

Group A

Pos	Team	Pld	W	D	L	GF	GA	GD	Pts
1	South Korea	3	2	1	0	11	1	+10	7
2	China	3	2	1	0	11	1	+10	7
3	Vietnam	3	1	0	2	4	7	−3	3
4	Jordan	3	0	0	3	1	18	−17	0

Source: RSSSF
November 14
19:00

China	10 – 1	Jordan
Ma Jun 7', 44'; Qu Shanshan 13', 17'; Xu Yuan 14', 84'; Li Lin 39', 46'; Liu Huana 54'; Pang Fengyue 90'	Report	Jbarah 19'

University City Stadium, Guangzhou
Referee: Pannipar Kamnueng (Thailand)

November 16
16:00

Jordan	0 – 5	South Korea
	Report	Ji So-Yun 4', 32' (pen.), 76'; Kwon Eun-Som 39'; Yoo Young-A 66'

University City Stadium, Guangzhou
Referee: Jacqui Melksham (Australia)

November 18
19:00

Vietnam	3 – 0	Jordan
Nguyen Thi Hoa 10', 60'; Nguyen Thi Muon 35'	Report

Huangpu Sports Center, Guangzhou
Referee: Abirami Naidu (Singapore)

== Karate ==
=== Men ===
Athlete	Event	1/16 Finals	1/8 Finals	Quarterfinals	Semifinals	Finals
Athlete	Event	Opposition Result	Opposition Result	Opposition Result	Opposition Result	Opposition Result
Bashar Al-Najjar	Kumite -60kg	Cheung Kwan Lok (HKG); W 5-2	Donny Dharmawan (INA); W 7-5	Dong Mingming (CHN); W 1-0	Ulugbek Mukhsimov (UZB); W 5-0	Darkhan Assadilov (KAZ); L 0-3 (silver)
Sufian Al-Malayeen	Kumite -67kg	Yuen Siu Lun (HKG); W Hantei	Rolando Lagman (PHI); W 3-0	Rinat Sagandykov (KAZ); L Hantei	Repechage 2 match: Kang Song-Ji (PRK); W 2-0	Bronze medal match: Fahad Al-Khathami (KSA); L 1-3
Mutasembellah Khai	Kumite -84kg	BYE	Jasem Vishgahi (IRI); L 2-6	Repechage 1 match: BYE	Repechage 2 match: Mohd Hatta Mahamu (MAS); W 6-0	Bronze medal match: Jang Min-Soo (KOR); W 9-3 (bronze)
Amer Abu-Afifeh	Kumite +84kg		Raid Hawsawi (KSA); W 2-1	Khalid Khalidov (KAZ); L 0-1	did not advance	

=== Women ===
Athlete	Event	1/8 Finals	Quarterfinals	Semifinals	Finals
Athlete	Event	Opposition Result	Opposition Result	Opposition Result	Opposition Result
Rada Jasser	Individual Kata	BYE	Cheung Pui Si (MAC); L 0-5	did not advance	
Manar Shath	Kumite +68kg		Park Jin-A (KOR); W 8-0	Tang Lingling (CHN); W 5-2	Jamaliah Jamaludin (MAS); W 5-2 (gold)

== Squash ==
Athlete	Event	1st Round	2nd Round	Quarterfinals	Semifinals	Final
Athlete	Event	Opposition Result	Opposition Result	Opposition Result	Opposition Result	Opposition Result
Ahmad Al-Zubaidi	Men's singles	Wang Junjie (CHN); W 3-0 (11-7, 11-2, 11-3)	Aamir Atlas Khan (PAK); L 0-3 (5-11, 7-11, 5-11)	did not advance		

== Swimming ==
=== Men ===
Event	Athletes	Heat		Final	
Event	Athletes	Time	Rank	Time	Rank
50 m freestyle	Rammaru Harada	24.09	21st	did not advance	
100 m freestyle	Rammaru Harada	53.75	31st	did not advance	
50 m butterfly	Rammaru Harada	25.91	18th	did not advance	
100 m butterfly	Rammaru Harada	57.77	24th	did not advance	

== Taekwondo ==
=== Men ===
Athlete	Event	Round of 32	Round of 16	Quarterfinals	Semifinals	Final
Athlete	Event	Opposition Result	Opposition Result	Opposition Result	Opposition Result	Opposition Result
Mohammad Al-Bakhit	Finweight (-54kg)	Nguyen Huu Nhan (VIE); L PTS 5-6	did not advance			
Kanaan Kanaan	Bantamweight (-63kg)	BYE	Poon Chun Ho (HKG); W SUP 1-1	Jawad Lakzaee (AFG); L PTS 6-7	did not advance	
Mohammad Abu-Libdeh	Featherweight (-68kg)	BYE	Mohammad Bagheri Motamed (IRI); L PTS 1-2	did not advance		
Nabil Talal	Welterweight (-80kg)	Yoshihiro Nagano (JPN); W PTS 14-0	Chien Yi-hsin (TPE); W PTS 10-6	Anand Pandia Rajan (IND); W PTS 5-3	Zhao Lin (CHN); W PTS 5-1	Nesar Ahmad Bahave (AFG); W PTS 4-3 (gold)
Yazan Al-Sadeq	Middleweight (-87kg)		Gayan Kumara (SRI); W 13-2	Park Yong-Hyun (KOR); L PTS 1-7	did not advance	
Mohammad Ayman	Heavyweight (+87kg)		BYE	Zheng Yi (CHN); L PTS 8-9	did not advance	

=== Women ===
Athlete	Event	Round of 32	Round of 16	Quarterfinals	Semifinals	Final
Athlete	Event	Opposition Result	Opposition Result	Opposition Result	Opposition Result	Opposition Result
Dana Haidar	Finweight (-46kg)		Deena Mahboob (BRN); W 18-0	Pauline Lopez (PHI); W 10-6	Fransisca Valentina (INA); W PTS 2-1	Huang Hsien-yung (TPE); L PTS 3-6 (silver)
Raya Hatahet	Flyweight (-49kg)		Manivanh Khounviseth (LAO); W PTS 6-4	Wu Jingyu (CHN); L PTS 2-20	did not advance	
Shahd Al-Tarman	Bantamweight (-53kg)	BYE	Lei Jie (CHN); W 9-1	Samaneh Sheshpari (IRI); L PTS 6-15	did not advance	
Marah Al-Sqour	Featherweight (-57kg)	Lee Sung-Hye (KOR); L PTS 3-12	did not advance			
Shaden Thweib	Lightweight (-62kg)		Srishti Singh (IND); W PTS 7-5	Chang Chiung-fang (TPE); L PTS 1-4	did not advance	
Nadin Dawani	Heavyweight (+73kg)			BYE	Oh Jung-Ah (KOR); L PTS 1-8 (bronze)	did not advance

== Wrestling ==
=== Men ===
Greco-Roman

Athlete	Event	Round of 16	Quarterfinals	Semifinals	Final
Athlete	Event	Opposition Result	Opposition Result	Opposition Result	Opposition Result
Yahia Abu-Tabeekh	96 kg	BYE	Mamoun Karama (PLE); W VT 5-0	Asset Mambetov (KAZ) 'L PO 0-3	Bronze medal match: An Chang-Gun (KOR); L PO 0-3
Hani Al-Marafy	120 kg	Soslan Farniev (UZB); W PO 3-0	Liu Deli (CHN) 'L PO 0-3	Bronze medal match: Murodjon Tuychiev (TJK); L PP 1-3	

== Wushu ==
=== Men ===
Sanshou

Athlete	Event	Round of 16	Quarterfinals	Semifinals	Final
Athlete	Event	Opposition Result	Opposition Result	Opposition Result	Opposition Result
Adham Azzam	60 kg	Kim Jun-Yul (KOR); L PTS 0-2	did not advance		
