= Bella Khotenashvili =

Georgian chess grandmaster (born 1988)

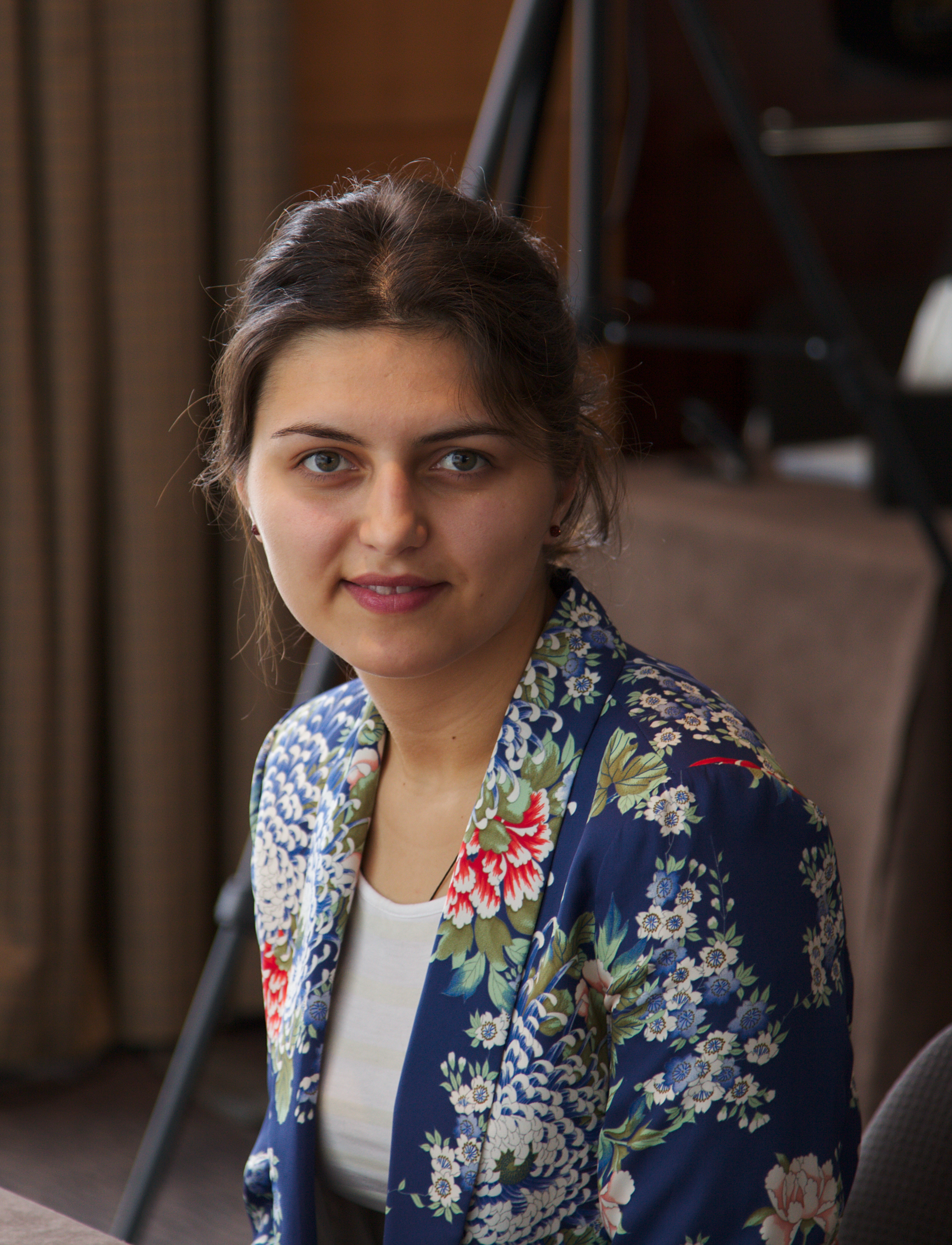
- Bella Khotenashvili at the FIDE Women's Grand Prix in Geneva, 2013

Personal information
- Born: 1 June 1988 (age 38) Telavi, Georgian SSR, Soviet Union

Chess career
- Country: Georgia
- Title: Grandmaster (2013)
- FIDE rating: 2413 (July 2026)
- Peak rating: 2531 (June 2013)

Bella Khotenashvili (Georgian: ბელა ხოტენაშვილი; born 1 June 1988), known prior to 2023 as Bela Khotenashvili, is a Georgian chess grandmaster. She competed in the Women's World Chess Championship in 2012, 2015 and 2017.

== Career ==
Khotenashivili won the World Youth Chess Championship in the girls under-16 category in 2004.

In 2009, she won the Maia Chiburdanidze Cup tournament edging out Lela Javakhishvili on tiebreak score. In 2011, she tied for first place with Nino Batsiashvili in the Group D tournament at the 9th Khazar International Open in Rasht, Iran. Khotenashvili won the Georgian Women's Championship in 2012.

In 2013 and 2014, Khotenashivili took part in the FIDE Women's Grand Prix series as host city nominee of Tbilisi. She won the first stage, which took place in Geneva. With this victory she achieved her third and final norm required for the title Grandmaster. In December 2014, she won the best woman's prize in the first edition of the Qatar Masters Open.

In 2016, Khotenashvili participated again in the FIDE Women's Grand Prix series. In 2017, she won for the second time the Georgian Women's Championship.

=== Team events ===
Khotenashvili has played for the Georgian national team in the Women's Chess Olympiad since 2010, Women's World Team Chess Championship since 2011, and Women's European Team Chess Championship since 2009. She won two gold medals, team and individual as the best player on the top board, in the Women's World Team Chess Championship 2015 in Chengdu, China. With team Georgia she has won also the silver medal at the 2009 Women's European Team Championship, and bronze in the 2010 Women's Chess Olympiad and 2011 Women's World Team Championship.

In the Women's European Chess Club Cup, with team "Nona" of Batumi she won the gold medal in 2014 and 2015, and silver in 2016.

== Personal life ==
She graduated from Tbilisi State University and then went on to study at Georgian Technical University.
