= Guliskhan Nakhbayeva =

Kazakhstani chess player (born 1991)

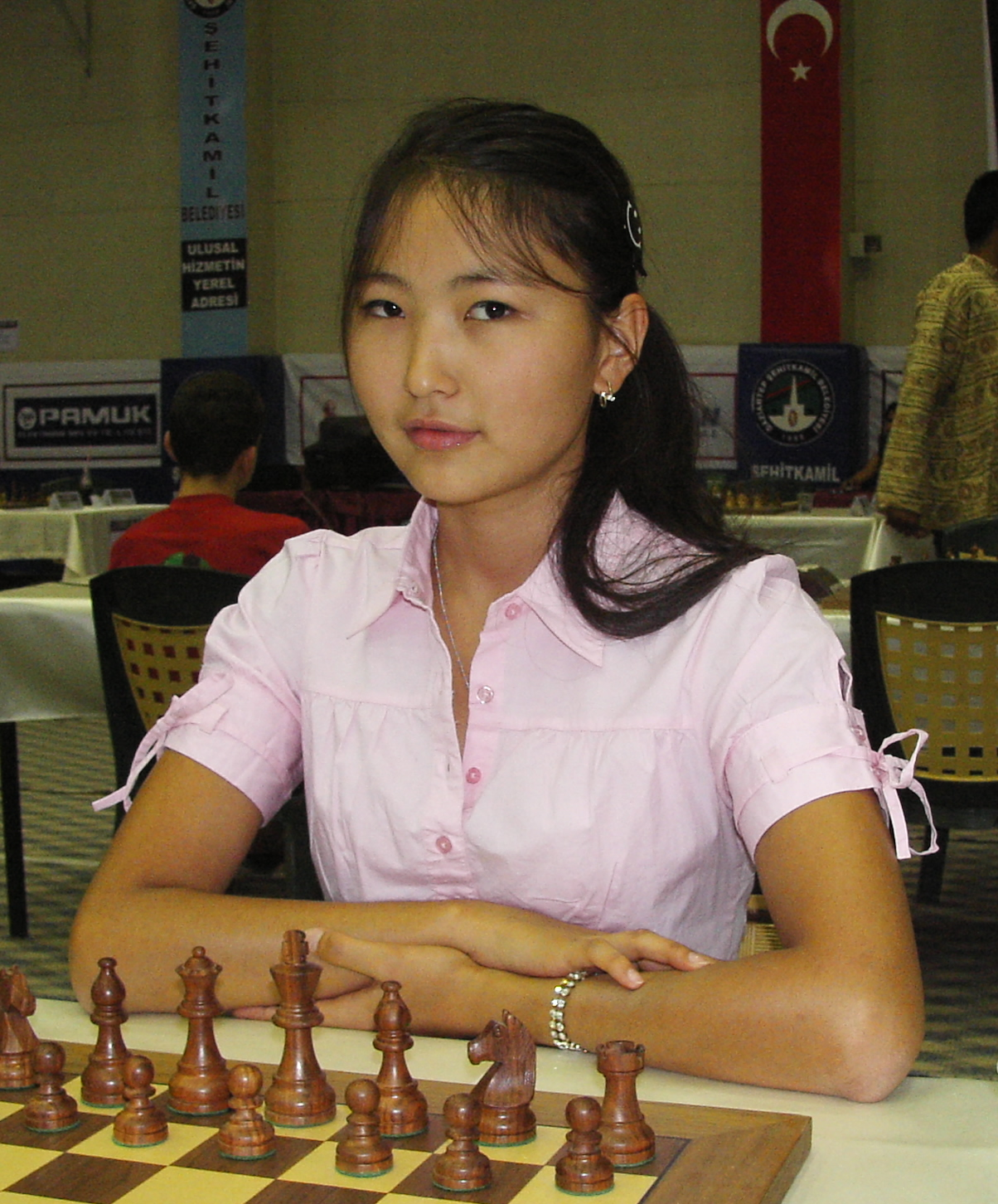
- Nakhbayeva in 2008

Personal information
- Born: 20 June 1991 (age 35) Shymkent, Kazakh SSR, Soviet Union

Chess career
- Country: Kazakhstan
- Title: International Master (2018); Woman Grandmaster (2012)
- FIDE rating: 2329 (January 2022)
- Peak rating: 2394 (September 2018)

Gülıshan Saifulinqyzy Nahbaeva (Note: Often transliterated as Guliskhan Nakhbayeva through a Russified Romanization of Гулисхан Нахбаева.) (Kazakh: Гүлісхан Сайфулинқызы Нахбаева; born 20 June 1991) is a chess player from Kazakhstan. She received the FIDE titles of Woman Grandmaster (WGM) in 2012 and International Master (IM) in 2018.

Nakhbayeva competed in the FIDE Women's Grand Prix 2013–14. She also competed in Chess at the 2010 Asian Games – Women's individual rapid. She was a member of the Kazakhstan Women Chess Olympic Team 2008–2014. Nakhbayeva was the top seed in the 2014 Kazakhstan Chess Championships for Women, a tournament in which she won the championship by the score of 7.5/9 points to finish a full point ahead of the second-place finisher. In doing so, Nakhbayeva won the Kazakhstani championship four years in a row. In 2018 Nakhbayeva participated in the Women's World Chess Championship and placed 28th in the tournament. In 2019, she tied for first place in the Kazakhstan Cup Final for Women with Tomilova Elena.
