= Batchimeg Tuvshintugs =

Mongolian chess player (born 1986)

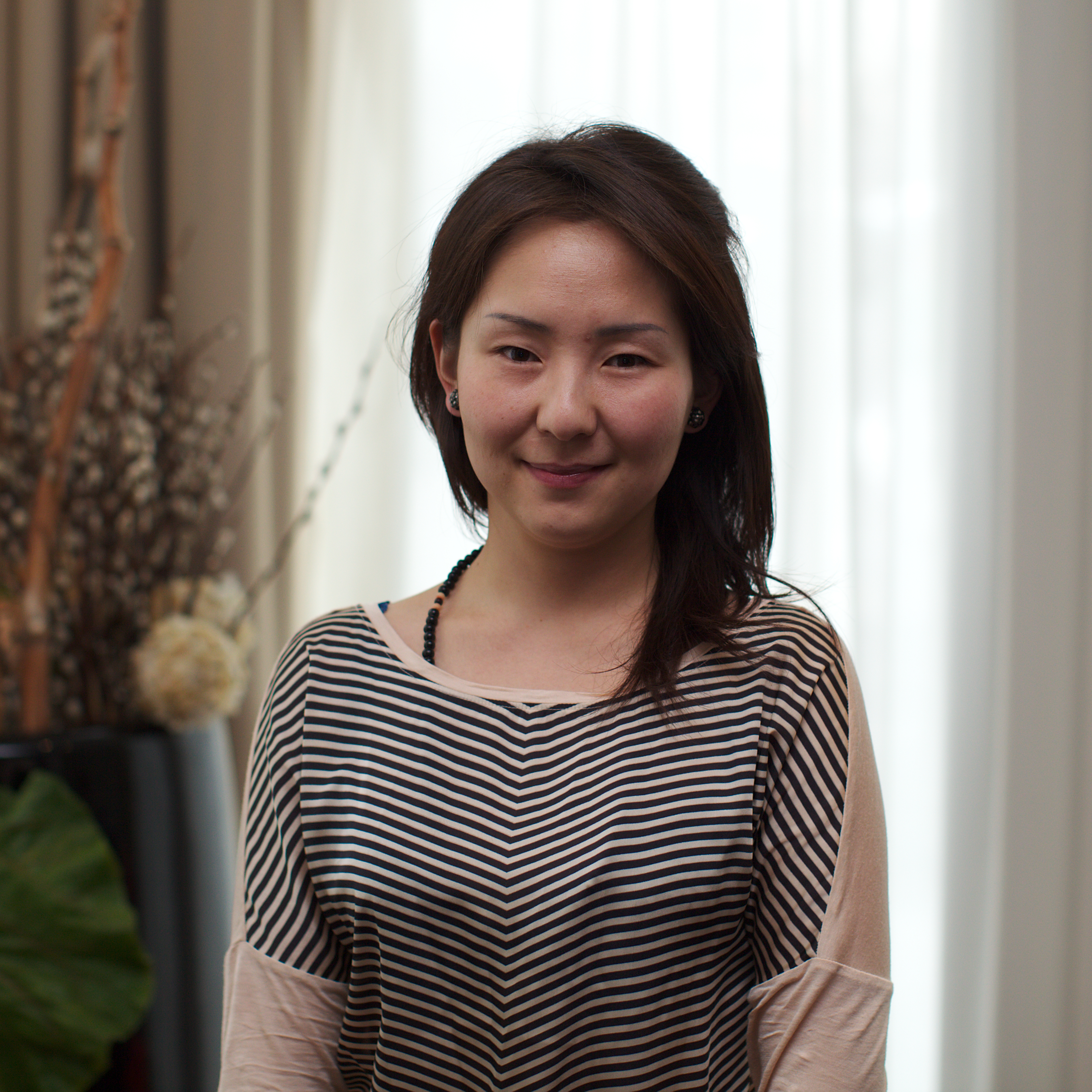
- Batchimeg in 2013

Personal information
- Born: Tüvshintögsiin Batchimeg; 3 May 1986 (age 40) Ulaanbaatar, Mongolia

Chess career
- Country: Mongolia; United States (2005–2009)
- Title: International Master (2014); Woman Grandmaster (2009)
- Peak rating: 2412 (May 2016)

Batchimeg Tuvshintugs (Mongolian: Түвшинтөгсийн Батчимэг, Tüvshintögsiin Batchimeg; born 3 May 1986) is a Mongolian chess player holding the titles of International Master (IM) and Woman Grandmaster (WGM). In 2016, Batchimeg was awarded the title State Honored Athlete of Mongolia.

== Career ==
Batchimeg won the Mongolian Women's Chess Championship in 2011 and 2016. In team events, she has represented Mongolia in the Women's Chess Olympiad in 2002, 2012, 2014 and 2016, Women's Asian Team Chess Championship in 2012 and 2016, and 2010 Asian Games.

She represented the United States from 2005 to 2009. In 2006, Batchimeg competed in the U.S. Chess Championship, held on March 2–11 in San Diego, California. Here she scored 3½ points in the first five rounds against grandmasters (Alexander Fishbein, Yury Shulman, Boris Kreiman, Boris Gulko and Julio Becerra). Her performance in this event earned her a norm for both Woman Grandmaster and International Master titles.

In 2013 and 2014, she competed in the FIDE Women's Grand Prix series. In the first stage, held in Geneva, she defeated the top seed, Hou Yifan. Batchimeg achieved her best result in the Sharjah leg, where she finished in joint third place with Harika Dronavalli, Zhao Xue and Anna Ushenina, and earned a norm for the title Grandmaster.
