= Sharmin Sultana Shirin =

Bangladesh chess player

Personal information
- Born: 26 January 1989 (age 37)

Chess career
- Country: Bangladesh
- Title: Woman International Master (2019)
- Peak rating: 2052 (November 2015)

Sharmin Sultana Shirin (Bengali: শারমিন সুলতানা শিরিন, born 26 January 1989) is a Bangladeshi chess player and two-time winner of the Women's Bangladeshi Chess Championship (2009 and 2013). In 2013, she became the sixth female Bangladeshi player to receive the FIDE title of Woman FIDE Master (WFM). She earned the Woman International Master title (WIM) in 2019.

== Chess career ==
She played chess at the 2010 Asian Games in the women's team standard and women's individual rapid events. She competed at the Chess Olympiads three times with the Bangladeshi women's chess team (2010, 2012, and 2014). She also played in the women's individual standard events at the 2013 and 2017 Asian Indoor and Martial Arts Games.

She was a participant at the Women's Chess World Cup 2021 in Sochi, where she was defeated by American player Carissa Yip in the first round.

== FIDE ratings ==
Elo development
View chart definition.

== See also ==
- Bengali name
