= Gulmira Dauletova =

Kazakhstani chess player (born 1988)

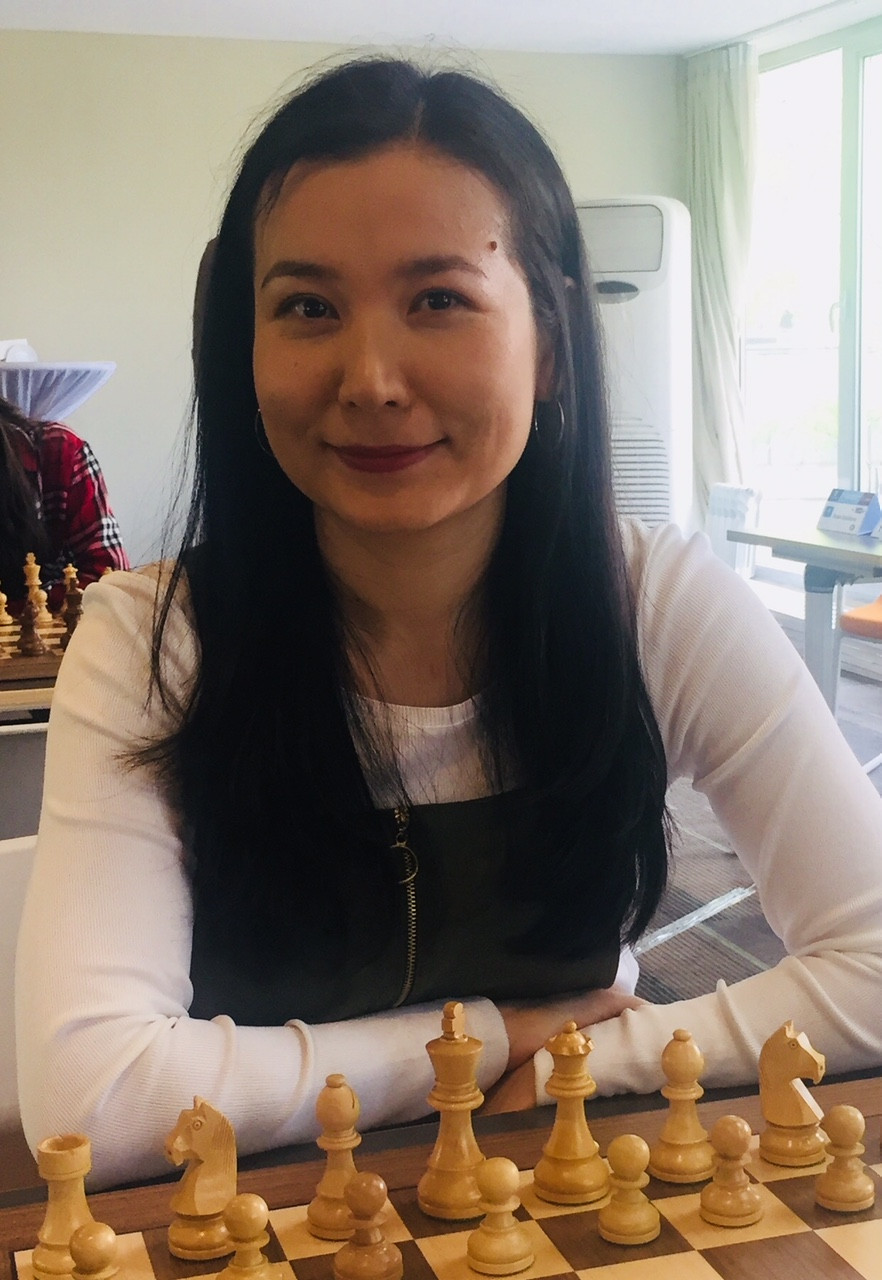
- Dauletova in 2011

Personal information
- Born: 13 April 1988 (age 38) Kazygurt District, Turkistan Region, Kazakh SSR, Soviet Union

Chess career
- Country: Kazakhstan
- Title: Woman Grandmaster (2020)
- Peak rating: 2319 (April 2020)

Gülmira Däuletova (Note: Often transliterated as Gulmira Dauletova through a Russified Romanization) (Kazakh: Гүлмира Дәулетова; born 13 April 1988) is a Kazakhstani chess player who holds the title of Woman Grandmaster (WGM, 2020), Women's Chess Olympiad individual bronze medal winner (2014).

== Biography ==
Gulmira Dauletova learned to play chess at the age of four. Since there was no chess section in the village of Kizigurtta, where Gulmira spent her childhood, she started participating in chess tournaments at the age of twelve. In 2001, Gulmira Dauletova won Uzbekistan Open Youth Chess Championship. In 2006, she won the Asian Youth Chess Championship in the U18 age group. In 2019, she won silver medal in Kazakhstani Women's Chess Championship.

Gulmira Dauletova played for Kazakhstani in Women's Chess Olympiads:

- In 2006, at third board in the 37th Chess Olympiad (women) in Turin (+6, =2, -5),
- In 2008, at first board in the 38th Chess Olympiad (women) in Dresden (+2, =3, -5),
- In 2010, at first board in the 39th Chess Olympiad (women) in Khanty-Mansiysk (+6, =1, -3),
- In 2012, at third board in the 40th Chess Olympiad (women) in Istanbul (+5, =0, -5),
- In 2014, at reserve board in the 41st Chess Olympiad (women) in Tromsø (+6, =2, -0) and won individual bronze medal,
- In 2016, at second board in the 42nd Chess Olympiad (women) in Baku (+4, =4, -2),
- In 2018, at fourth board in the 43rd Chess Olympiad (women) in Batumi (+5, =0, -3).

Gulmira Dauletova played for Kazakhstani in the World Women's Team Chess Championships:

- In 2013, at second board in the 4th Women's World Team Chess Championship in Astana (+1, =4, -2),
- In 2015, at fourth board in the 5th Women's World Team Chess Championship in Chengdu (+3, =4, -1),
- In 2019, at reserve board in the 7th Women's World Team Chess Championship in Astana (+1, =3, -1).

Gulmira Dauletova played for Kazakhstani in the Women's Asian Team Chess Championships:

- In 2012, at second board in the 7th Asian Team Chess Championship (women) in Zaozhuang (+2, =3, -4),
- In 2014, at second board in the 8th Asian Team Chess Championship (women) in Tabriz (+1, =2, -1) and won individual bronze medal,
- In 2016, at second board in the 9th Asian Team Chess Championship (women) in Abu Dhabi (+4, =2, -2) and won team bronze and individual silver medals.

Gulmira Dauletova played for Kazakhstani in the Asian Indoor Games:

- In 2007, at second women board in the 2nd Asian Indoor Chess Games in Macau (+4, =0, -2).

In 2007, she was awarded the FIDE Woman International Master (WIM) title, and in 2020, the FIDE Woman Grandmaster (WGM) title.
