= Asmita Adhikari =

Nepali singer

Asmita Adhikari अस्मिता अधिकारी
- Born: April 14, 1996 (age 30); Damak, Jhapa, Nepal
- Genre: Playback
- Occupation: Singer
- Years active: 2018–present
- Spouse: Mahesh Kafle (married 2025–present)

Asmita Adhikari (Nepali: अस्मिता अधिकारी; born 14 April 1996) is a Nepalese playback singer from Damak , Jhapa who finished as the third runner-up in Nepal Idol Season 2 and has performed songs such as "Sali Man Paryo" and "Tadha Vaye Pani". Adhikari holds a degree in nursing but has primarily pursued music as a career.

== Early life ==
Adhikari was born on 14 April 1996, in Damak, Jhapa, Nepal. She developed an early interest in music and participated in inter-school singing competitions. She holds a Bachelor of Science in Nursing and is a registered nurse.

== Musical career ==
In 2018, Asmita Adhikari competed in Nepal Idol Season 2, where she finished as the third runner-up.

Her debut song was "Timro Mayale Badhera Rakha". She collaborated with Kali Prasad Baskota on the song "Sali Man Paryo" for the movie Ghamad Shere, which has over 150 million views on YouTube. She also released a rendition of "Tadha Vaye Pani".

Adhikari has provided playback vocals for several movies, including Ma Yesto Geet Gauchhu 2, Ghamad Shere, A Mero Hajur 4, Chapali Height, Rato Tika Nidharma, Prasad, Babari, Aincho Paincho, and Jai Ho. Adhikari also performed in multiple cities of US during 2023 Dashain and Tihar festival.

== Personal life ==
Adhikari married Mahesh Kale, a Nepali musician and lyricist, in 2025.

== Partial discography ==
- Timro Mayale Bandhera Rakha
- Sali Man Paryo (with Kali Prasad Baskota)
- Tadha Vaye Pani
- Ma Jindagi Bhari
- Selfie Mobile

== Awards ==
Year	Award	Category	Song	Result	Ref.
2023	National Music Awards	Best Duet Song	Lajjawati Jhar	Won	
2023	National Music Awards	Best Playback Singer	Babari Rang Ma	Won	

- Natikaji Rastriya Shastriya Sangeet Puraskar 2022 – won
- Chinnalata Geet Puraskar – won
