= Mähri Geldiýewa =

Turkmen chess player

Personal information
- Born: 4 April 1973 (age 53)

Chess career
- Country: Soviet Union; Turkmenistan
- Title: Woman Grandmaster (1998)
- Peak rating: 2339 (January 1999)

Mähri Geldiýewa (née Ovezova, born 4 April 1973) is a Turkmen chess player who holds the title of Woman Grandmaster (WGM).

== Chess career ==
In 1993 in Kozhikode Geldiýewa won the bronze medal in the World Girls U-20 Championship. In 1998 in Pahang, Malaysia, she won the bronze medal in the Asian women's Chess Championship. In 2009, she divided the second place in the international chess tournament in Sari and won Turkmenistan women's chess championship.

In 1996 Geldiýewa awarded the FIDE Woman International Master (WIM) and in 1998 the Woman Grandmaster (WGM) title. She became the first and so far the only Turkmen women chess player who received a Woman Grandmaster title.

== Teams ==
Geldiýewa has played from 1986 to 1991 for Turkmenistan in Soviet Women's Team Chess Championships. She has played for Turkmenistan in 7 Chess Olympiads (1994-2002, 2006, 2010) and won two individual gold medals at Board 1 in 32nd Chess Olympiad (1996) and 33rd Chess Olympiad (1998). In 2010 she played in the Asian Games.
