= Atousa Pourkashiyan =

Iranian-American chess player (born 1988)

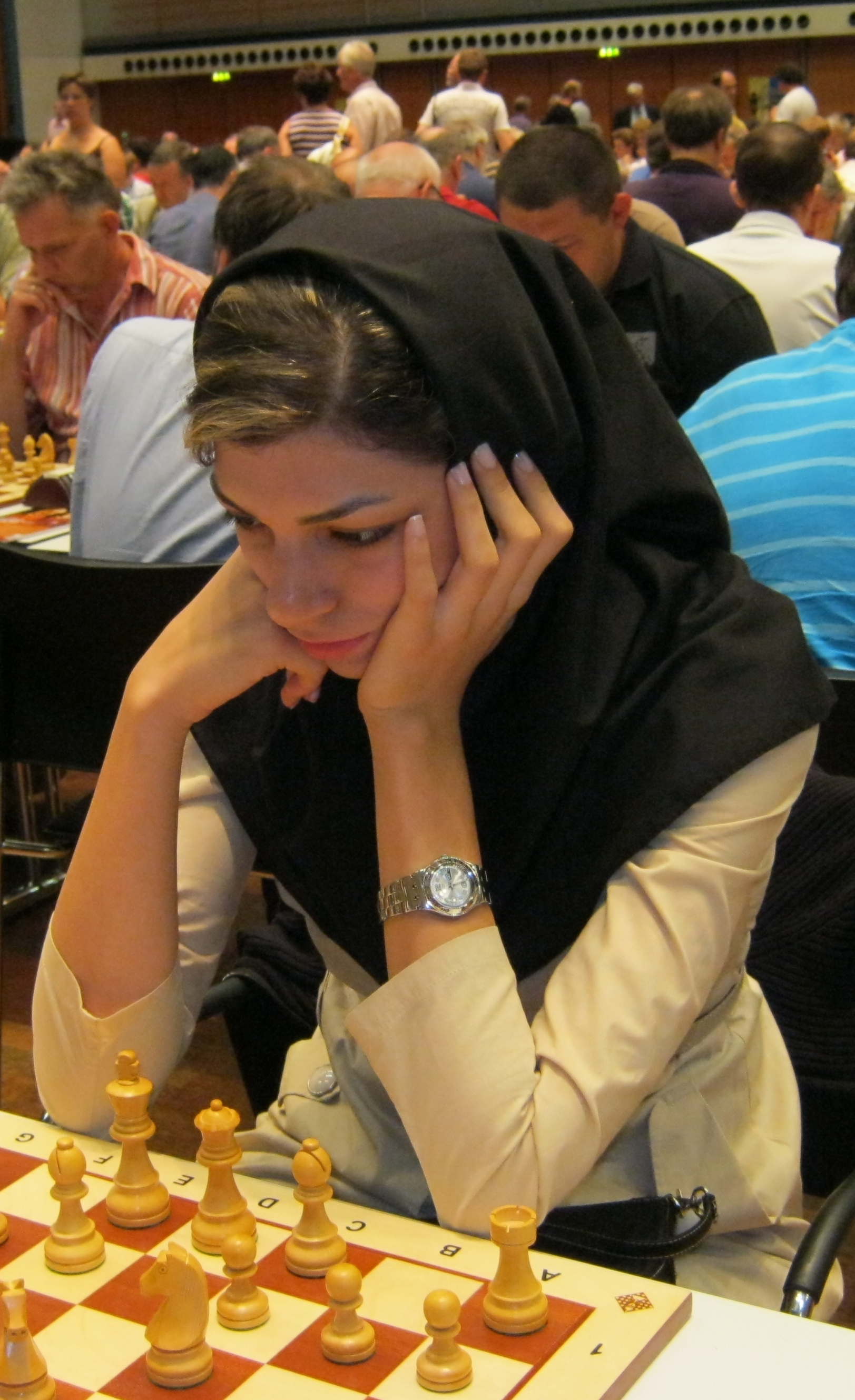
- Pourkashiyan in 2010
- Born: 16 May 1988 (age 38); Tehran, Iran
- Education: University of Tehran
- Spouse: Hikaru Nakamura (m. 2023)
- Children: 1
- Chess career
- Country: Iran (until 2022); United States (since 2022)
- Title: Woman Grandmaster (2009)
- FIDE rating: 2238 (December 2025)
- Peak rating: 2374 (May 2011)

Atousa Pourkashiyan (Persian: آتوسا پورکاشیان; Persian pronunciation: [ɒːtuːˈsɒː puːɾkɒːʃiˈjɒːn]; born 16 May 1988) is an Iranian-American chess player. She holds the title of Woman Grandmaster, which FIDE awarded her in 2009.

== Career ==
Pourkashiyan began playing chess when she was 8 years old. She is a seven-time Iranian women's champion (2005, 2007, 2008, 2009, 2011, 2013, 2014) and a record holder among Iranian women chess players.

She was born in Tehran. Pourkashiyan won the World Youth Chess Championship of 2000 in the Girls U12 category.

In April 2010, Pourkashiyan won the Asian Women's Chess Championship in Subic Bay. She competed in the Women's World Chess Championship in 2006, 2008, 2012, 2017.

In team competitions, she has played for Iran at eight Women's Chess Olympiads (2000–2014), the Women's Asian Team Chess Championship, and the World Youth U16 Chess Olympiad.

In 2023, Pourkashiyan won an individual silver medal on Board 5 in the FIDE Women's Team Championship, helping Team USA reach the semifinals.

In 2024, Pourkashiyan won the XV Americas Women's Continental Chess Championship, qualifying her for the 2025 Women's Chess World Cup.

== Personal life ==
Pourkashiyan studied at the University of Tehran and received a bachelor's degree in sport science and physical education and a master's degree in sport management.

Pourkashiyan married American grandmaster and five-time US Champion Hikaru Nakamura in 2023.

Pourkashiyan was in the news alongside Sarasadat Khademalsharieh when she competed at the World Rapid and Blitz Championship 2022, without a hijab, amidst the Mahsa Amini protests. In December 2022, she changed her federation from Iran to the United States, where she currently resides.

Awards and achievements
| Preceded by Zhang Xiaowen | Women's Asian Chess Champion; 2010 | Succeeded by Harika Dronavalli |
