= Noura Mohamed Saleh =

Emirati chess player (born 1989)

Personal information
- Born: 1989 (age 36–37)

Chess career
- Country: United Arab Emirates
- Title: Woman International Master (2009)
- Peak rating: 1955 (June 2017)

Noura Mohamed Saleh (Arabic: نورا محمد صالح; born 1989) is an Emirati chess player. She received the FIDE title of Woman International Master (WIM) in 2009 and is a four-time Emirati Women's Chess Championship winner (2008, 2010, 2011, 2016). She was the Women's Chess Olympiad individual gold medal winner in 2006.

== Biography ==
Noura Mohamed Saleh successfully participated in the Arab States Youth Chess Championships in different age groups: in 2005, she won U16 girls age group, in 2007, ranked 2nd U18 girls age group and in 2009, she won U20 girls age group. Saleh is multiple winner of Emirati Women's Chess Championship (2008, 2010, 2011, 2016). In 2011, she won International Women's Chess tournament Sharjah International Cup.

Saleh played for United Arab Emirates team in the Women's Chess Olympiads:

- In 2006, at third board in the 37th Chess Olympiad (women) in Turin (+6, =2, -0) and won individual gold medal,
- In 2008, at first board in the 38th Chess Olympiad (women) in Dresden (+3, =3, -5),
- In 2010, at first board in the 39th Chess Olympiad (women) in Khanty-Mansiysk (+2, =4, -5),
- In 2012, at first board in the 40th Chess Olympiad (women) in Istanbul (+4, =1, -6).

Also she played for United Arab Emirates team in the Women's Asian Team Chess Championship (2016), Asian Games chess tournament (2006), Pan Arab Games chess tournament (2007).

In 2009, Saleh was awarded the FIDE Woman International Master (WIM) title.
