= Phạm Lê Thảo Nguyên =

Vietnamese chess player (born 1987)

- Phạm Lê Thảo Nguyên in 2026

Personal information
- Born: 7 December 1987 (age 38) Cần Thơ, Vietnam
- Spouse: Nguyễn Ngọc Trường Sơn (m. 2015)

Chess career
- Country: Vietnam
- Title: International Master (2013); Woman Grandmaster (2011)
- Peak rating: 2426 (January 2013)

Phạm Lê Thảo Nguyên (born 7 December 1987) is a Vietnamese chess player who holds the titles of International Master and Woman Grandmaster.

She has qualified for the knockout tournament Women's World Chess Championship 2017 as the winner of a zonal stage.

She has played multiple times for Vietnam's team in Women's Chess Olympiad: in 2008 (Dresden), 2010 (Khanty-Mansiysk), 2012 (Istanbul), 2014 (Tromsø), 2016 (Baku) and 2018 (Batumi).

In 2011 she was member of the Vietnamese women's team that played in the World Team Chess Championship.

She is married to the Vietnamese chess grandmaster Nguyễn Ngọc Trường Sơn.
