= Shadi Paridar =

Iranian chess player (born 1986)

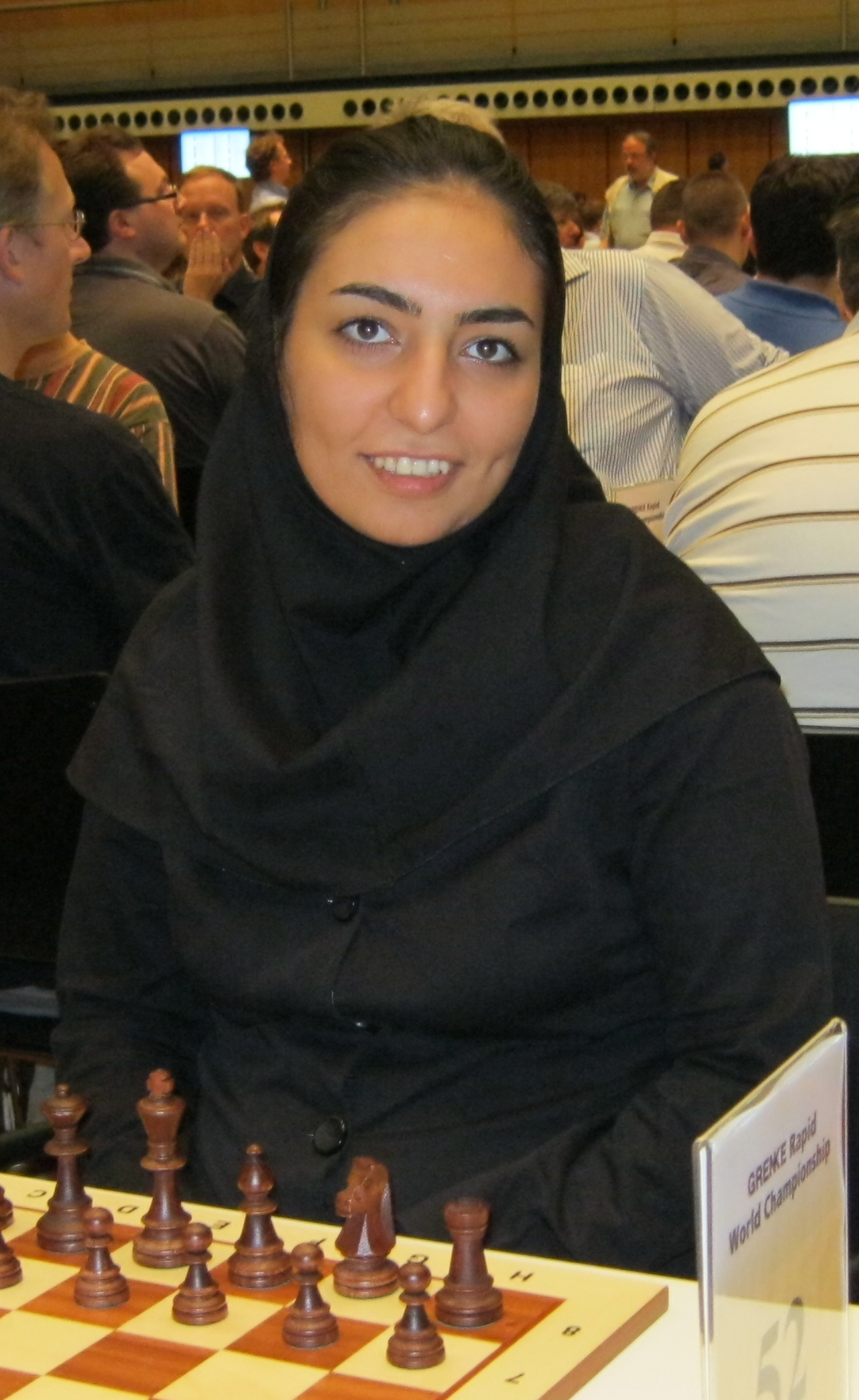
- Shadi Paridar, 2010

Personal information
- Born: 2 July 1986 (age 40)

Chess career
- Country: Iran
- Title: Woman Grandmaster (2004)
- FIDE rating: 2250 (January 2011)
- Peak rating: 2274 (January 2005)

Shadi Paridar (Persian: شادی پریدر; born 2 July 1986) is the President of Islamic Republic of Iran Chess Federation since February 2025. She is an Iranian chess player holding the title of Woman Grandmaster (WGM), who won Iranian Women Chess Championship four times. She won the Asian Under-16 Girls' Championship in 2002 in Tehran.

She played for Iran in the Women's Chess Olympiads of 2002, 2004, 2006, 2008 and 2010, and in the Women's Asian Team Chess Championships of 1995, 2003, 2005, 2008 and 2009.
