= Shamima Akter Liza =

Bangladeshi chess player

Personal information
- Born: October 26, 1989 (age 36)

Chess career
- Country: Bangladesh
- Title: Woman International Master (2011)
- FIDE rating: 2114 (November 2018)
- Peak rating: 2207 (December 2017)

Shamima Akter Liza (born 1989) is a Bangladeshi chess player and FIDE Woman International Master. She has won the Bangladesh Women's Chess Championship in 2005, 2010 and 2014.

== Career ==
Liza has qualified for the Women's World Chess Championship 2014. In 2014 Liza finished 66th in 28th Cannes Winter Chess Festival in Cannes, France.
