= Zhao Xue =

Chinese chess grandmaster (born 1985)

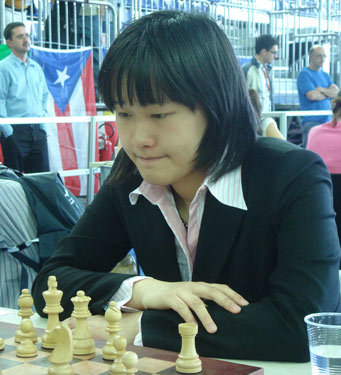

Personal information
- Born: 6 April 1985 (age 41) Jinan, Shandong, China

Chess career
- Country: China
- Title: Grandmaster (2008)
- FIDE rating: 2433 (July 2026)
- Peak rating: 2579 (September 2013)

Zhao Xue (Chinese: 赵雪; pinyin: Zhào Xuě; born 6 April 1985) is a Chinese chess player. She is the 24th Chinese person to achieve the title of Grandmaster. Zhao was a member of the gold medal-winning Chinese team at the Women's Chess Olympiad in 2002, 2004 and 2016, and at the Women's World Team Chess Championship in 2007, 2009 and 2011. She has competed in the Women's World Chess Championship in 2004, 2006, 2008, 2010, 2012, 2015, 2017 and 2018, reaching the semifinals in 2010.

== Career ==
Zhao won two gold medals at the World Youth Chess Championships, in the Girls Under 12 section, in 1997, and in the Girls Under 14, in 1999. In 2002, she won the World Junior Girls Championship in Goa, India, edging out defending champion Koneru Humpy on tie-break. This victory qualified her to the Women's World Chess Championship 2004, in which she knocked out Shadi Paridar in the first round, then lost to Elisabeth Pähtz and therefore was eliminated from the competition.

Zhao qualified thanks to her rating to the Women's World Chess Championship 2006, in which she lost in the first round to Maria Kursova. Later in the same year, she took part in the 2006 Asian Games, held in Doha, and won the silver medal in the women's individual rapid chess event.

In July 2007, she won the Queens Woman Grandmasters tournament in Bad Homburg and tied for first place with former women's world champion Zhu Chen in the women's supertournament North Urals Cup in Krasnoturinsk, Russia after both finished on a score of 6/9, but placed second on tiebreak. In this tournament she also achieved her final "norm" required for the title of Grandmaster; the first one was gained at the 2006 Women's Chess Olympiad. FIDE awarded her the title in 2008.

In the Women's World Chess Championship 2008, Zhao was knocked out in the second round by compatriot Shen Yang, after defeating Marisa Zuriel in the first. In the following month, in October 2008, she won the silver medal in the women's individual rapid event at the World Mind Sports Games, which took place in Beijing.

Zhao took part in the FIDE Women's Grand Prix 2009–11, for which she qualified via rating. Her best results were third place at Nanjing 2009 and shared 3rd-5th in Ulaanbaatar 2010 events. In November 2010, she took part in the 2010 Asian Games, held in Guangzhou, and won the silver medal in the women's individual rapid chess event.

In December 2010, she participated in the Women's World Chess Championship and this time she reached the semifinals, where she lost by 1½-2½ to her compatriot and eventual runner-up Ruan Lufei. This result enabled her to qualify for the FIDE Women's Grand Prix 2011–2012. In the leg held in Shenzhen, Zhao scored 6/11 and finished in joint 5th-6th place along with Ruan Lufei, earning her 75 points in the Grand Prix. In October 2011, she won the Nalchik stage, with a score of 9½/11. In July 2012, she finished seventh in Jermuk on 5½/11. In the Ankara event, she placed third with 7½/11. In the Grand Prix overall standings, Zhao placed fourth with 345 points.

In April 2012, Zhao won the 2nd China Women Masters Tournament in Wuxi. In the following month, she won the Asian Women's Blitz Championship, held in Ho Chi Minh City, on tiebreak over Wang Jue and Tan Zhongyi. At the Women's World Chess Championship 2012 she made it to the quarterfinals, where she lost to Dronavalli Harika.

In January 2013, Zhao won the prize for best female player at the Masters event of the Gibraltar Chess Festival scoring 7½/10. She finished second, behind Hou Yifan, in the women's standard event at the 2013 Asian Indoor and Martial Arts Games. Soon after she won the women's chess tournament at the 2013 Summer Universiade in Kazan, contributing to China's team gold.

Zhao competed in the FIDE Women's Grand Prix 2013–14. In January 2015, she won the New Zealand Open with a score of 8/9. Zhao took part in the Women's World Chess Championship 2015, where she reached the quarterfinals, losing to the eventual runner-up, Natalia Pogonina. In the 2017 edition, she lost in the second round to Padmini Rout. In December of the same year, Zhao won the gold medal in the women's Basque chess event at the IMSA Elite Mind Games in Huai'an. In November 2018, she took part again in the Women's World Championship; Zhao defeated Carolina Lujan in the first round by 2–0, then went out in the second after losing to Zhansaya Abdumalik in the tiebreakers.

=== Team competitions ===
Zhao, as a first reserve, scored 11 points out of 12 (performance rating of 2723) on board 4 in the 2002 Women's Chess Olympiad, held in Bled. In next edition, held two years later in Calvià, she scored 10/12 on board 3 (performance rating of 2603) winning an individual gold medal. In 2006, she scored 10/13 on board 1 (performance rating of 2615) winning an individual gold.

Zhao played first board on the Chinese women's team in the 2005 World Team Chess Championship held in Beersheba, Israel. Two years later, she led China to victory in the first Women's World Team Championship with a score of 6½/8 (performance rating of 2693).

Zhao Xue plays for Beijing chess club in the China Chess League (CCL).

== Honors since 2011 ==
Individual

- 2012: China Women's Masters, Wuxi, China
- 2011: FIDE Women's Grand Prix, Nalchik, Russia

Team

- 2012: Asian Women's Nations Cup, Zaozhuang, China
- 2011: FIDE Women's World Team Championship, Mardin, Turkey
- 2011: China League Division A, Tianjin, China
