= Boshra Al-Shaeby =

Jordanian chess player (born 1995)

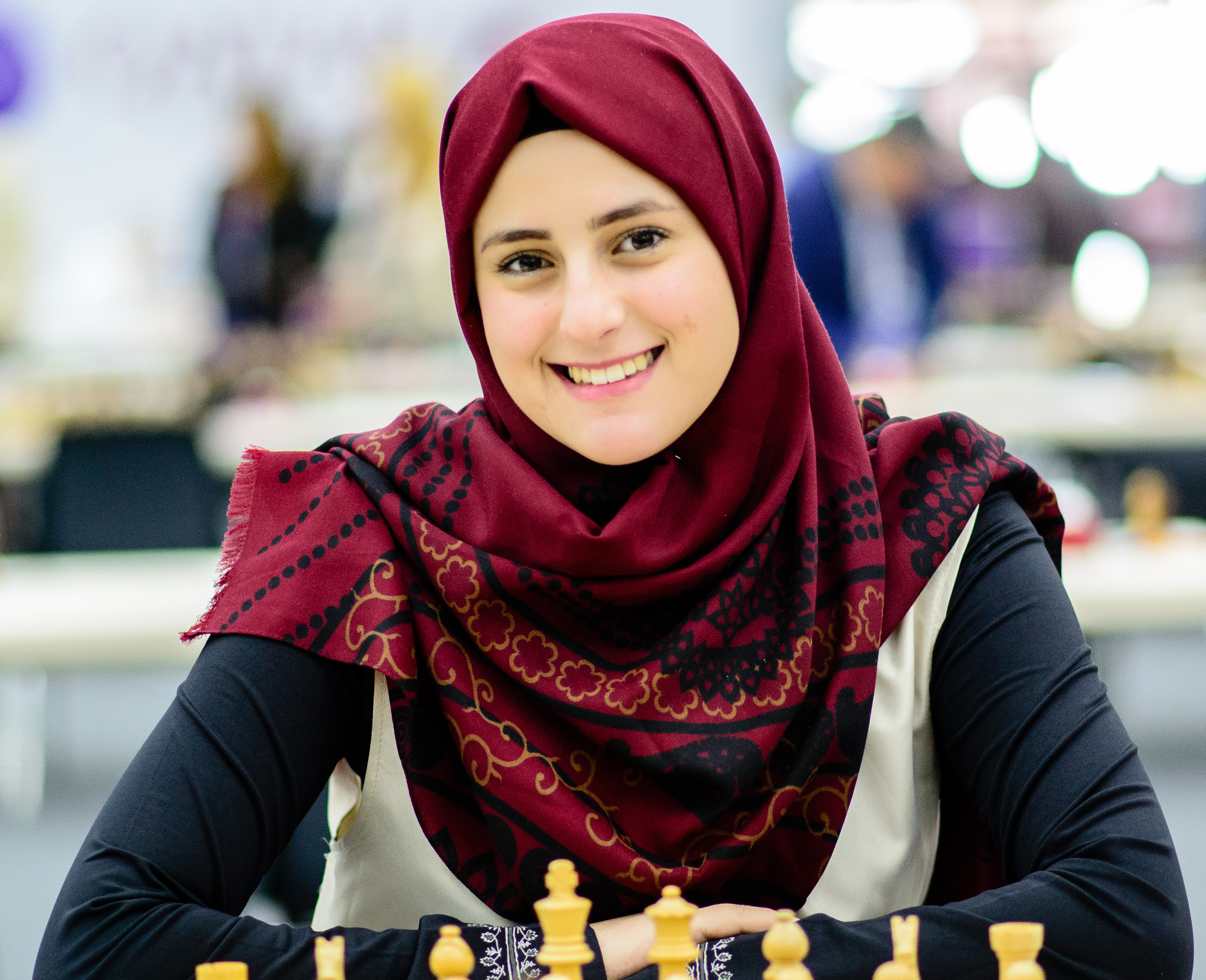
- Boshra Alshaebyi in 2016

Personal information
- Born: September 29, 1995 (age 31)

Chess career
- Country: Jordan
- Title: Woman International Master (2022)
- Peak rating: 2081 (September 2019)

Boshra Al-Shaeby (Arabic: بشرى الشعيبي; born 1995) is a Jordanian chess player who holds the title of Woman International Master. She was an individual gold medalist in the 43rd Chess Olympiad (women) in 2018.

== Chess career ==
In 2011, Boshra Al-Shaeby won Arab Youth Chess Championship in girls U16 age group. She twice won Jordan Women's Chess Championship (2015, 2018). Two years in row Boshra Al-Shaeby won bronze medal in Arab Women's Individual Chess Championship: in 2016 (5 pts. out of 7 games) and in 2017 (7 pts. out of 9 games). Also two years in row she won Arab Women's Individual Blitz Championship (2016, 2017).

Boshra Al-Shaeby played for Jordan in the Women's Chess Olympiads:

- In 2010, at fourth board in the 39th Chess Olympiad (women) in Khanty-Mansiysk (+6, =0, -3),
- In 2012, at fourth board in the 40th Chess Olympiad (women) in Istanbul (+4, =3, -4),
- In 2014, at fourth board in the 41st Chess Olympiad (women) in Tromsø (+3, =3, -4),
- In 2016, at third board in the 42nd Chess Olympiad (women) in Baku (+6, =0, -5),
- In 2018, at reserve board in the 43rd Chess Olympiad (women) in Batumi (+8, =0, -0) and won individual gold medal.

Boshra Al-Shaeby played for Jordan in the Men's Asian Team Chess Championship (2016). Boshra Al-Shaeby played for Jordan in the Pan Arab Games (women) Team Chess Championship (2011) and won team silver medal.
