= Nafisa Muminova =

Uzbekistani chess player (born 1990)

- Muminova at the 2026 Chess Olympiad

Personal information
- Born: 1 February 1990 (age 36) Tashkent, Uzbek SSR, Soviet Union

Chess career
- Country: Uzbekistan
- Title: Woman Grandmaster (2013)
- FIDE rating: 2226 (January 2023)
- Peak rating: 2360 (November 2010)

Nafisa Muminova (born 1 February 1990 in Tashkent) is an Uzbekistani chess player.

She won the women's Uzbekistani Chess Championship in 2008 2009, and 2011, won silver medals in the 2008 Asian Youth Championship and as first board in the team event at the 2010 Asian Games, and competed in the Women's World Chess Championship in 2008 and 2010. She is a Woman Grandmaster, the first woman from Uzbekistan to reach that title.

== Early life ==
She started playing chess when she was 9 years old. She has been working as a chess coach since 2012. She has a bachelor degree in "Sports psychology" since she graduated from Uzbek State University of Physical Culture and Sport. She is the co-founder and CEO of "Sky Chess" chess school in Tashkent.

== Career ==
In the Uzbek Women's Chess Championship in 2005 in Tashkent, she finished third. She also achieved third place at the Women's Zonal Tournament in 2005 in Tashkent. In 2007, she won the Uzbek Junior Women's Championship in Tashkent. Once again, she secured the second position at the Uzbek Women's Championship in 2007 in Tashkent. She won the Women's Zonal Tournament in Tashkent in 2008, which qualified her for the Women's World Championship. At the Asian U18 Girls' Championship in Tehran in 2008, she came in second place. However, at the Women's World Championship in Nalchik in 2008, she was eliminated in the first round by Tatiana Kosintseva. In 2009, she became the Uzbek Women's Champion for the second time in Tashkent and once again won a Zonal Tournament in Tashkent, securing a two-point lead. She claimed her third Uzbek Individual title in Tashkent in 2011.

With Uzbekistan, she participated in the Asian Women's Team Championship in 2008 in Visakhapatnam, playing on the third board. She played at the top board for the Uzbek Women's team at the Chess Olympiads in 2008 in Dresden, 2010 in Khanty-Mansiysk, and 2012 in Istanbul. She also represented Uzbekistan at the 2010 Asian Games in Guangzhou, where the Uzbek Women's National Team finished in second place. At the 2009 Asian Indoor Games in Hanoi, she played on the first women's board for the Uzbek selection, which secured the third position.

In March 2009, she was awarded the title of Women's International Master (WIM). She achieved the norms for this title in August 2008 at the U20 World Girls Championship in Gaziantep and in November at the Women's Chess Olympiad in Dresden. She became a Women's Grandmaster (WGM) in January 2013, earning norms for this title in August 2009 at the 6th Dato Arthur Tan Open in Kuala Lumpur, in August 2010 at the U20 World Girls Championship in Chotowa, and in September 2012 at the Women's Chess Olympiad in Istanbul. In the German Women's Bundesliga, she was registered for SF 1891 Friedberg during the 2014/15 season but she did not participate.

== See also ==
- Irina Semenova (chess)
