= Hoàng Thị Bảo Trâm =

Vietnamese chess player (born 1987)

Personal information
- Born: 9 January 1987 (age 39)

Chess career
- Country: Vietnam
- Title: Woman Grandmaster (2006)
- Peak rating: 2410 (October 2017)

Hoàng Thị Bảo Trâm (born 9 January 1987) is a Vietnamese chess player and Woman Grandmaster. She is a two-time Vietnamese Women's Chess Championship winner (2011, 2018), Women's Asian Team Chess Championship team gold winner (2005), and two-time World Women's Team Chess Championships individual medalist (2011, 2017).

== Biography ==
Hoàng Thị Bảo Trâm won Vietnamese Women's Chess Championship in 2011 and in 2018.

Hoàng Thị Bảo Trâm played for Vietnam in the Women's Chess Olympiads:

- In 2006, at second board in the 37th Chess Olympiad (women) in Turin (+5, =4, -2),
- In 2008, at fourth board in the 38th Chess Olympiad (women) in Dresden (+4, =0, -4),
- In 2010, at first board in the 39th Chess Olympiad (women) in Khanty-Mansiysk (+3, =2, -4),
- In 2014, at third board in the 41st Chess Olympiad (women) in Tromsø (+4, =2, -3),
- In 2016, at second board in the 42nd Chess Olympiad (women) in Baku (+4, =3, -4),
- In 2018, at third board in the 43rd Chess Olympiad (women) in Batumi (+3, =2, -2).

Hoàng Thị Bảo Trâm played for Vietnam in the World Women's Team Chess Championships:

- In 2007, at third board in the 1st Women's World Team Chess Championship in Yekaterinburg (+1, =3, -3),
- In 2009, at first board in the 2nd Women's World Team Chess Championship in Ningbo (+1, =5, -3),
- In 2011, at second board in the 3rd Women's World Team Chess Championship in Mardin (+4, =2, -2) and won individual bronze medal,
- In 2017, at second board in the 5th Women's World Team Chess Championship in Khanty-Mansiysk (+3, =4, -0) and won individual gold medal.

Hoàng Thị Bảo Trâm played for Vietnam in the Women's Asian Team Chess Championships:

- In 2005, at first reserve board in the 4th Asian Team Chess Championship (women) in Isfahan (+3, =2, -0) and won team and individual gold medals,
- In 2008, at first reserve board in the 5th Asian Team Chess Championship (women) in Visakhapatnam (+2, =2, -0) and won team bronze and individual silver medals,
- In 2014, at second board in the 8th Asian Women's Nations Chess Cup in Tabriz (+2, =2, -1) and won individual bronze medal,
- In 2016, at second board in the 9th Asian Women's Nations Chess Cup in Abu Dhabi (+4, =1, -2) and won individual bronze medal.

Hoàng Thị Bảo Trâm played for Vietnam in the Asian Games:

- In 2010, at first board in the 16th Asian Games (chess - women) in Guangzhou (+0, =4, -4) and won team bronze medal.

Hoàng Thị Bảo Trâm played for Vietnam in the Asian Indoor Games:

- In 2009, at first women board in the 3rd Asian Indoor Chess Games in Hanoi (+4, =4, -2) and won team silver medal.

In 2005, she was awarded the FIDE Woman International Master (WIM) title and received the FIDE Woman Grandmaster (WGM) title a year later.
