= Azumi (name) =

Azumi can be either a Japanese given name or surname.

== People ==
=== Given Name ===
- Azumi (あづみ), Japanese member of the two-piece group Wyolica
- Azumi Asakura (浅倉 杏美; born 1987), Japanese voice actress
- Azumi Bebeji (born 1950), Nigerian politician
- Azumi Hyuga (日向 あずみ; born 1975), Japanese retired wrestler
- Azumi Inoue (井上 あずみ or 井上 杏美; born 1965), Japanese singer
- Azumi Kawashima (川島 和津実; born 1979), Japanese idol and pornographic film actress
- Azumi Muto (武藤 亜澄; 1986–2006), Japanese pin-up model
- Azumi Oka (born 2006), Filipino-American college soccer player
- Azumi Sakai (坂井 あづみ; born 1991), Japanese chess player
- Azumi Uehara (上原 あずみ; born 1984), Japanese former Porn actress and Japanese pop singer
- Azumi Waki (和氣 あず未; born 1994), Japanese voice actress

=== Surname ===
- Jun Azumi (安住 淳; born 1962), Japanese politician
- Jun Azumi (voice actor) (安澄 純), Japanese voice actor
- Ryō Azumi (あずみ 椋; born 1959) (fl. 1980s to present), a Japanese manga artist
- Shiro Azumi (安積 四郎; 1902–????), Japanese football player

== Fictional characters ==
- Azumi, the titular character of the manga and film series Azumi
- Hime Azumi, a character in the manga Tokyo Mew Mew
- Azumi Hidaka, a character in the Mirmo! manga series
- Azumi Yamada, a character in Hen
- Azumi, a character in the tokusatsu Kamen Rider Blade, human guise of the Serpent Undead
- Yūsuke Azumi, character from Fireworks, Should We See It from the Side or the Bottom?
- Azumi Hayakawa, character from the Captain Tsubasa anime series
