= Azumi (disambiguation) =

Azumi is a Japanese comic and media franchise.

Azumi may also refer to:

- Azumi (name)
- Azumi people, a people of ancient Japan
- Azumi, Nagano, a former village in Minamiazumi District, Nagano Prefecture, Japan, that was merged into Matsumoto in 2005
- Azumi (film), a film based on the manga

== See also ==
- Azumi-Kutsukake Station, a railway stop on the Oito Line in Japan
- Azumi-Oiwake Station, a railway stop on the Oito Line in Japan
