= Trần Thanh Tú =

Vietnamese-Japanese chess player (born 1990)

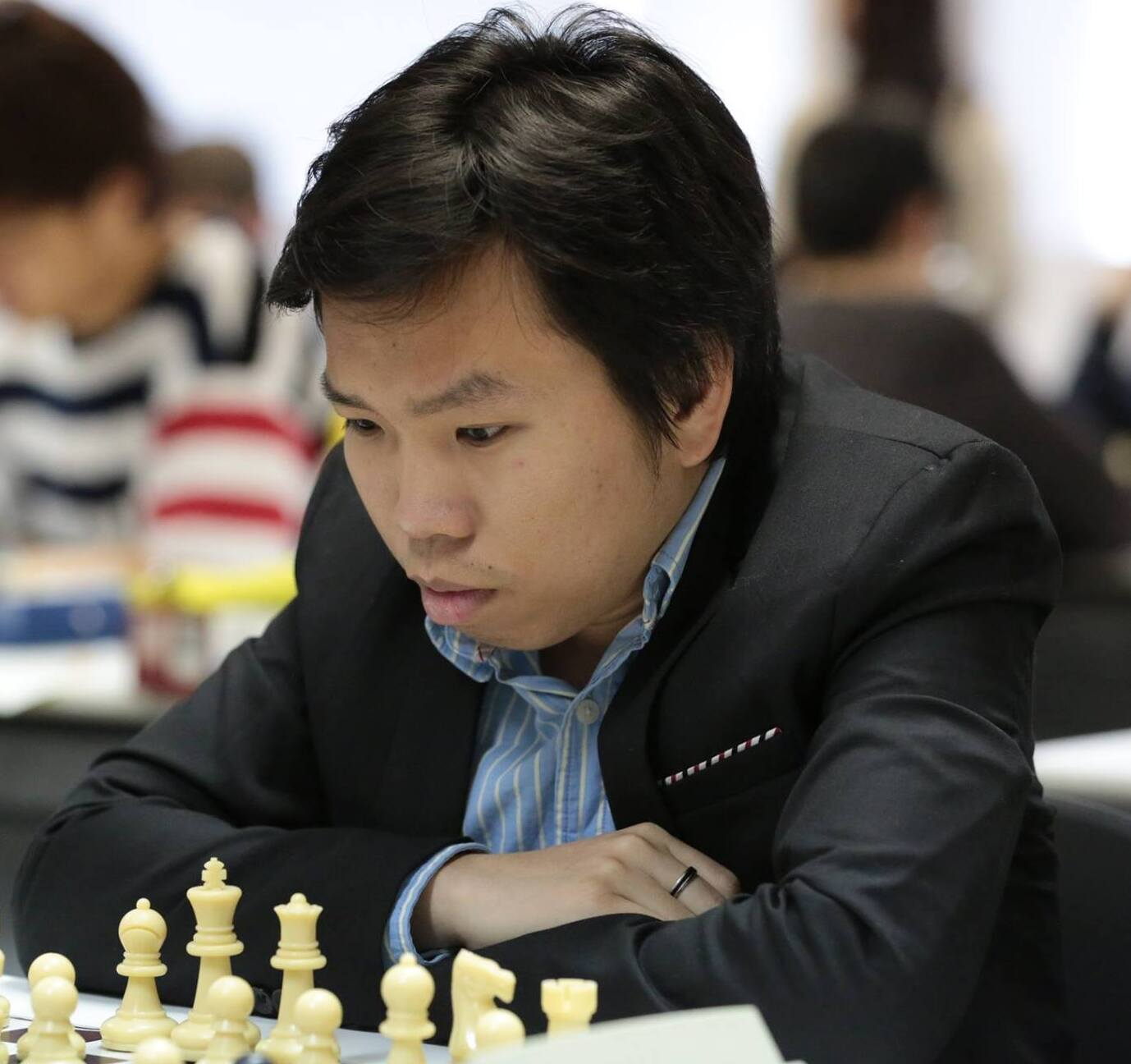
- Trần Thanh Tú at the Japanese Chess Championship in 2016

Personal information
- Born: September 12, 1990 (age 35) Châu Thành, Vietnam

Chess career
- Country: Vietnam (until 2020); Japan (since 2020)
- Title: International Master (2024)
- Peak rating: 2430 (June 2025)

Trần Thanh Tú is a Vietnamese chess player who represents Japan. He is the highest-rated Japanese chess player.

== Chess career ==
Trần grew up in a rural region and began playing chess around age 4 to 5 after being introduced to the game by his brothers.

In 2013, Trần graduated from Can Tho University with an IT degree, and began working as a software developer.

In May 2015, Trần won the Vietnamese national men's singles fast chess championship, notably winning ahead of grandmasters Nguyễn Đức Hòa and Nguyễn Ngọc Trường Sơn.

In July 2015, Trần moved to Japan to work for an engineering company, and he also joined a chess club in the country.

In September 2016, Trần began representing Japan at the 42nd Chess Olympiad. In 2020, he was the team captain.

Trần has been the Japanese national champion in 2016, 2018, and 2020. He officially transferred federations from Vietnam to Japan in February 2020. In 2022, he finished second in the national championship to Mirai Aoshima, but represented Japan alongside him at the 44th Chess Olympiad.

Trần played in the Chess World Cup 2023, where he was defeated by David Paravyan in the first round.

In September 2024, he played for Japan in the 45th Chess Olympiad, where he defeated a number of grandmasters: Ádám Kozák, Ahmad Al-Khatib, and Vignir Vatnar Stefansson. Upon these achievements, he was awarded the International Master title, having previously been the world's highest-rated Candidate Master.
