= Sprinter (manga) =

Japanese manga series

- The cover of Sprinter volume 1

スプリンター (Supurintā)
- Manga
- Written by: Yū Koyama
- Published by: Shogakukan
- Imprint: Shōnen Sunday Comics
- Magazine: Weekly Shōnen Sunday
- Original run: October 31, 1984 – April 8, 1987
- Volumes: 14

Sprinter (Japanese: スプリンター, Hepburn: Supurintā) is a Japanese manga series written and illustrated by Yū Koyama. It was serialized in Shogakukan's Weekly Shōnen Sunday from October 1984 to April 1987. Its chapters were collected in fourteen tankōbon volumes.

== Manga ==
Sprinter is written and illustrated by Yū Koyama. It started in the 1984 46th issue of Shogakukan's Weekly Shōnen Sunday on October 31, 1984, and was his second manga serialized in the magazine after Ganbare Genki. It finished in the 1987 17th issue of the magazine on April 8, 1987. The series was collected into fourteen tankōbon volumes published by Shogakukan, released from April 18, 1985, to May 18, 1987.

=== Volume list ===
No.	Japanese release date	Japanese ISBN
1	April 18, 1985	978-4-09-121271-9
2	June 18, 1985	978-4-09-121272-6
3	July 18, 1985	978-4-09-121273-3
4	September 18, 1985	978-4-09-121274-0
5	November 18, 1985	978-4-09-121275-7
6	March 18, 1986	978-4-09-121276-4
7	May 17, 1986	978-4-09-121277-1
8	July 18, 1986	978-4-09-121278-8
9	August 13, 1986	978-4-09-121279-5
10	September 18, 1986	978-4-09-121280-1
11	November 18, 1986	978-4-09-121551-2
12	January 17, 1987	978-4-09-121552-9
13	March 18, 1987	978-4-09-121553-6
14	May 18, 1987	978-4-09-121554-3
