= Watai =

Watai (written: 渡井) is a Japanese surname. Notable people with the surname include:

- Masaki Watai (渡井 理己, born 1999), Japanese footballer
- Miyoko Watai (渡井 美代子, born 1945), Japanese chess player
