= Chess at the 2006 Asian Games – Women's individual rapid =

Asian Games Chess competition

Women's individual rapid at the 2006 Asian Games
- Venue: Al-Dana Indoor Hall
- Date: 2–4 December 2006
- Competitors: 21 from 21 nations

Medalists
gold medal	Koneru Humpy	India
silver medal	Zhao Xue	China
bronze medal	Zhu Chen	Qatar

The women's individual rapid competition at the 2006 Asian Games in Doha was held from 2 December to 4 December at the Al-Dana Indoor Hall.

== Schedule ==
All times are Arabia Standard Time (UTC+03:00)

Date	Time	Event
Saturday, 2 December 2006	11:00	Round 1
Saturday, 2 December 2006	15:00	Round 2
Saturday, 2 December 2006	17:00	Round 3
Sunday, 3 December 2006	11:00	Round 4
Sunday, 3 December 2006	15:00	Round 5
Sunday, 3 December 2006	17:00	Round 6
Monday, 4 December 2006	11:00	Round 7
Monday, 4 December 2006	15:00	Round 8
Monday, 4 December 2006	17:00	Round 9

== Results ==
=== Round 1 ===
White	Score	Black
Shamima Akter Liza (BAN)	0–1	Koneru Humpy (IND)
Zhu Chen (QAT)	1–0	Natalie Jamaliah (JOR)
Afamia Mir Mahmoud (SYR)	0–1	Zhao Xue (CHN)
Batkhuyagiin Möngöntuul (MGL)	1–0	Emiko Nakagawa (JPN)
Yasoda Methmali (SRI)	0–1	Atousa Pourkashian (IRI)
Nguyễn Thị Thanh An (VIE)	1–0	Noura Mohamed Saleh (UAE)
Chan I Sin (MAC)	0–1	Dana Aketayeva (KAZ)
Mähri Geldiýewa (TKM)	½–½	Jedara Docena (PHI)
Shadia Jaradat (PLE)	0–1	Irene Kharisma Sukandar (INA)
Olga Sabirova (UZB)	1–0	Monalisa Khamboo (NEP)
Aysha Mutaywea (BRN)	1–0	Bye

=== Round 2 ===
White	Score	Black
Koneru Humpy (IND)	1–0	Nguyễn Thị Thanh An (VIE)
Dana Aketayeva (KAZ)	0–1	Zhu Chen (QAT)
Zhao Xue (CHN)	0–1	Olga Sabirova (UZB)
Irene Kharisma Sukandar (INA)	½–½	Batkhuyagiin Möngöntuul (MGL)
Atousa Pourkashian (IRI)	1–0	Aysha Mutaywea (BRN)
Natalie Jamaliah (JOR)	0–1	Mähri Geldiýewa (TKM)
Jedara Docena (PHI)	½–½	Shamima Akter Liza (BAN)
Noura Mohamed Saleh (UAE)	0–1	Afamia Mir Mahmoud (SYR)
Emiko Nakagawa (JPN)	1–0	Chan I Sin (MAC)
Monalisa Khamboo (NEP)	0–1	Yasoda Methmali (SRI)
Shadia Jaradat (PLE)	1–0	Bye

=== Round 3 ===
White	Score	Black
Olga Sabirova (UZB)	0–1	Koneru Humpy (IND)
Zhu Chen (QAT)	0–1	Atousa Pourkashian (IRI)
Mähri Geldiýewa (TKM)	1–0	Irene Kharisma Sukandar (INA)
Batkhuyagiin Möngöntuul (MGL)	0–1	Zhao Xue (CHN)
Nguyễn Thị Thanh An (VIE)	1–0	Jedara Docena (PHI)
Yasoda Methmali (SRI)	0–1	Dana Aketayeva (KAZ)
Afamia Mir Mahmoud (SYR)	1–0	Shadia Jaradat (PLE)
Aysha Mutaywea (BRN)	½–½	Emiko Nakagawa (JPN)
Shamima Akter Liza (BAN)	1–0	Noura Mohamed Saleh (UAE)
Chan I Sin (MAC)	0–1	Natalie Jamaliah (JOR)
Monalisa Khamboo (NEP)	1–0	Bye

=== Round 4 ===
White	Score	Black
Koneru Humpy (IND)	1–0	Atousa Pourkashian (IRI)
Zhu Chen (QAT)	1–0	Mähri Geldiýewa (TKM)
Zhao Xue (CHN)	½–½	Nguyễn Thị Thanh An (VIE)
Dana Aketayeva (KAZ)	½–½	Olga Sabirova (UZB)
Batkhuyagiin Möngöntuul (MGL)	½–½	Afamia Mir Mahmoud (SYR)
Irene Kharisma Sukandar (INA)	1–0	Aysha Mutaywea (BRN)
Emiko Nakagawa (JPN)	0–1	Shamima Akter Liza (BAN)
Shadia Jaradat (PLE)	0–1	Yasoda Methmali (SRI)
Jedara Docena (PHI)	1–0	Monalisa Khamboo (NEP)
Natalie Jamaliah (JOR)	1–0	Noura Mohamed Saleh (UAE)
Chan I Sin (MAC)	1–0	Bye

=== Round 5 ===
White	Score	Black
Koneru Humpy (IND)	1–0	Zhu Chen (QAT)
Atousa Pourkashian (IRI)	½–½	Nguyễn Thị Thanh An (VIE)
Mähri Geldiýewa (TKM)	0–1	Zhao Xue (CHN)
Shamima Akter Liza (BAN)	1–0	Dana Aketayeva (KAZ)
Afamia Mir Mahmoud (SYR)	0–1	Irene Kharisma Sukandar (INA)
Olga Sabirova (UZB)	1–0	Natalie Jamaliah (JOR)
Yasoda Methmali (SRI)	0–1	Batkhuyagiin Möngöntuul (MGL)
Aysha Mutaywea (BRN)	0–1	Jedara Docena (PHI)
Emiko Nakagawa (JPN)	1–0	Shadia Jaradat (PLE)
Monalisa Khamboo (NEP)	1–0	Chan I Sin (MAC)
Noura Mohamed Saleh (UAE)	1–0	Bye

=== Round 6 ===
White	Score	Black
Zhao Xue (CHN)	1–0	Koneru Humpy (IND)
Atousa Pourkashian (IRI)	1–0	Olga Sabirova (UZB)
Irene Kharisma Sukandar (INA)	1–0	Shamima Akter Liza (BAN)
Nguyễn Thị Thanh An (VIE)	1–0	Zhu Chen (QAT)
Jedara Docena (PHI)	½–½	Batkhuyagiin Möngöntuul (MGL)
Dana Aketayeva (KAZ)	1–0	Afamia Mir Mahmoud (SYR)
Mähri Geldiýewa (TKM)	1–0	Emiko Nakagawa (JPN)
Natalie Jamaliah (JOR)	1–0	Monalisa Khamboo (NEP)
Noura Mohamed Saleh (UAE)	1–0	Aysha Mutaywea (BRN)
Chan I Sin (MAC)	0–1	Shadia Jaradat (PLE)
Yasoda Methmali (SRI)	1–0	Bye

=== Round 7 ===
White	Score	Black
Koneru Humpy (IND)	1–0	Irene Kharisma Sukandar (INA)
Zhao Xue (CHN)	1–0	Atousa Pourkashian (IRI)
Batkhuyagiin Möngöntuul (MGL)	1–0	Nguyễn Thị Thanh An (VIE)
Shamima Akter Liza (BAN)	0–1	Mähri Geldiýewa (TKM)
Olga Sabirova (UZB)	1–0	Jedara Docena (PHI)
Natalie Jamaliah (JOR)	0–1	Dana Aketayeva (KAZ)
Zhu Chen (QAT)	1–0	Yasoda Methmali (SRI)
Monalisa Khamboo (NEP)	0–1	Afamia Mir Mahmoud (SYR)
Shadia Jaradat (PLE)	1–0	Noura Mohamed Saleh (UAE)
Aysha Mutaywea (BRN)	1–0	Chan I Sin (MAC)
Emiko Nakagawa (JPN)	1–0	Bye

=== Round 8 ===
White	Score	Black
Mähri Geldiýewa (TKM)	0–1	Koneru Humpy (IND)
Dana Aketayeva (KAZ)	0–1	Zhao Xue (CHN)
Atousa Pourkashian (IRI)	1–0	Batkhuyagiin Möngöntuul (MGL)
Irene Kharisma Sukandar (INA)	1–0	Olga Sabirova (UZB)
Afamia Mir Mahmoud (SYR)	0–1	Zhu Chen (QAT)
Nguyễn Thị Thanh An (VIE)	1–0	Shamima Akter Liza (BAN)
Jedara Docena (PHI)	1–0	Emiko Nakagawa (JPN)
Shadia Jaradat (PLE)	½–½	Aysha Mutaywea (BRN)
Yasoda Methmali (SRI)	1–0	Chan I Sin (MAC)
Noura Mohamed Saleh (UAE)	1–0	Monalisa Khamboo (NEP)
Natalie Jamaliah (JOR)	1–0	Bye

=== Round 9 ===
White	Score	Black
Koneru Humpy (IND)	1–0	Dana Aketayeva (KAZ)
Zhao Xue (CHN)	1–0	Irene Kharisma Sukandar (INA)
Atousa Pourkashian (IRI)	0–1	Mähri Geldiýewa (TKM)
Zhu Chen (QAT)	1–0	Jedara Docena (PHI)
Olga Sabirova (UZB)	1–0	Nguyễn Thị Thanh An (VIE)
Batkhuyagiin Möngöntuul (MGL)	1–0	Natalie Jamaliah (JOR)
Emiko Nakagawa (JPN)	0–1	Yasoda Methmali (SRI)
Shamima Akter Liza (BAN)	1–0	Shadia Jaradat (PLE)
Aysha Mutaywea (BRN)	0–1	Monalisa Khamboo (NEP)
Chan I Sin (MAC)	0–1	Noura Mohamed Saleh (UAE)
Afamia Mir Mahmoud (SYR)	1–0	Bye

=== Summary ===
Rank	Athlete	Rtg	Round									Total	SRO
Rank	Athlete	Rtg	1	2	3	4	5	6	7	8	9	Total	SRO
1st place, gold medalist(s)	Koneru Humpy (IND)	2545	1	1	1	1	1	0	1	1	1	8	18663
2nd place, silver medalist(s)	Zhao Xue (CHN)	2467	1	0	1	½	1	1	1	1	1	7½	18623
3rd place, bronze medalist(s)	Zhu Chen (QAT)	2501	1	1	0	1	0	0	1	1	1	6	17637
4	Atousa Pourkashian (IRI)	2329	1	1	1	0	½	1	0	1	0	5½	18606
5	Mähri Geldiýewa (TKM)	2273	½	1	1	0	0	1	1	0	1	5½	18098
6	Batkhuyagiin Möngöntuul (MGL)	2383	1	½	0	½	1	½	1	0	1	5½	17146
7	Olga Sabirova (UZB)	2230	1	1	0	½	1	0	1	0	1	5½	16192
8	Irene Kharisma Sukandar (INA)	2239	1	½	0	1	1	1	0	1	0	5½	15977
9	Nguyễn Thị Thanh An (VIE)	2312	1	0	1	½	½	1	0	1	0	5	18430
10	Yasoda Methmali (SRI)	1895	0	1	0	1	0	1	0	1	1	5	11458
11	Dana Aketayeva (KAZ)	2312	1	0	1	½	0	1	1	0	0	4½	17705
12	Jedara Docena (PHI)	0	½	½	0	1	1	½	0	1	0	4½	15728
13	Shamima Akter Liza (BAN)	2096	0	½	1	1	1	0	0	0	1	4½	15493
14	Afamia Mir Mahmoud (SYR)	1983	0	1	1	½	0	0	1	0	1	4½	13781
15	Natalie Jamaliah (JOR)	1988	0	0	1	1	0	1	0	1	0	4	13578
16	Noura Mohamed Saleh (UAE)	1879	0	0	0	0	1	1	0	1	1	4	8379
17	Shadia Jaradat (PLE)	0	0	1	0	0	0	1	1	½	0	3½	12025
18	Emiko Nakagawa (JPN)	1933	0	1	½	0	1	0	1	0	0	3½	8647
19	Monalisa Khamboo (NEP)	0	0	0	1	0	1	0	0	0	1	3	9975
20	Aysha Mutaywea (BRN)	0	1	0	½	0	0	0	1	½	0	3	8380
21	Chan I Sin (MAC)	0	0	0	0	1	0	0	0	0	0	1	10007
