= Azumi 2: Death or Love =

2005 film by Shūsuke Kaneko

- Japanese theatrical poster
- Directed by: Shusuke Kaneko
- Screenplay by: Mataichiro Yamamoto; Yoshiaki Kawajiri
- Based on: Azumi by Yū Koyama
- Produced by: Toshiaki Nakazawa; Mataichiro Yamamoto
- Starring: Aya Ueto; Yuma Ishigaki; Chiaki Kuriyama; Shun Oguri
- Cinematography: Yoshitaka Sakamoto
- Edited by: Shuichi Kakesu
- Production companies: Nippon Herald Films; Tokyo Broadcasting System; Shogakukan; Toshiba Entertainment; Toho; Imagica
- Distributed by: Toho
- Release date: 12 May 2005 (Japan)
- Running time: 108 minutes
- Country: Japan
- Box office: $2,888,549

Azumi 2: Death or Love (あずみ2 Death or Love, Azumi Tsū Desu oa Rabu) is a Japanese jidaigeki film directed by Shusuke Kaneko, and starring Aya Ueto, Yuma Ishigaki, Chiaki Kuriyama and Shun Oguri. It is the only sequel to the Japanese film Azumi based on the manga series of the same title by Yū Koyama.

== Plot ==
Azumi and her only remaining colleague Nagara find themselves hunted by ninjas hired by General Kanbei for the assassinations they have carried out. One of which is the killing of his master. They hid temporarily in a temple so Nagara can heal his wounds sustained from their recent encounter. Azumi comes across some bandits led by Ginkaku, a young bandit who bears a striking resemblance to Azumi's former friend (and love interest) Nachi. Later, Azumi and Nagara are found by the allied ninjas working for the priest Tenkai, upon whose orders the assassins initially began their mission. After discussing it with Tenkai, Azumi and Nagara leave to seek out their final target, Sanada Masayuki. On their mission they are accompanied by a government ninja, a young woman named Kozue.

Meanwhile, Kanbei Inoue assembles a large force of mercenary soldiers, ninja and bandits to try to avenge the death of his master Kiyomasa Kato. Amongst them are Ginkaku and his brother, Kinkaku. Azumi and the others then return to Ginkaku's village, where they are looked upon with distaste for their occupation. Azumi is torn by her attachment to Ginkaku, but on Nagara's urging they separate paths.

While travelling, Kozue convinces Nagara that Azumi no longer wishes to fulfill her mission and should be talked out of it. Nagara tells Azumi he is fed up and wants to start a new life with Kozue, and that Azumi should go and live with Ginkaku, and they part ways. Azumi, still intent on carrying out the mission, attempts to locate Masayuki in his mountain temple, only to discover he has left with his army to kill Gessai. He and his entourage have departed for safety, but are soon tracked down by the brutal giant Roppa (a character similar to the Ninja Scroll character Tessai), a member of the dangerous Uenokagashu ninja clan working for Masayuki. Most of Gessai's guards are killed until Azumi arrives, as do Ginkaku and his brethren who had been following her. Roppa is killed (by his own weapon), as are Kinkaku, several of Ginkaku's band and most of Kasumi's ninja squad.

Meanwhile, once Nagara and Kozue are alone, Kozue reveals herself to be a spy for the Uenokagashu clan and kills Nagara. Coming across Azumi later, she tells her that she and Nagara were separated, but when she attempts to kill Gessai, they fight and Kozue is killed by Azumi. Azumi then states she will go after Masayuki alone. Soon she comes upon the enemy ninja named Tsuchigumo, whose weapon are razor-sharp poisoned wires. Azumi manages to cause his wires to rebound back at him and he is sliced apart, but Azumi is cut and falls into a paralytic sleep. Sanada's concubine and the true leader of Uenokagashu ninja clan, Kunio, steps out of hiding to tell Azumi she feels that Azumi, who has killed so many, knows nothing of life. With the poison incapacitating Azumi, it soon came to a finishing blow, but Ginkaku appears, taking the fatal thrust and in the process mortally injuring Kunio. Ginkaku managed to dampen the poison's effect upon Azumi, shortly before dying. Kunio makes her way back to her camp, only to die in Sanada's arms.

Shortly after this, Azumi appears on a hill in the distance. Fighting her way through many of Sanada's troops, she is met by the man she intends to kill. Sanada's son Yukimura and Gessai both arrive at the same time, both wanting Sanada to retreat, but Sanada is eager to kill Azumi by himself. He decides to challenge her to a duel and he tells Kanbei to leave. At the acceptance of these terms, the last member of Ginkaku's band is killed, as he declares the decision is unjust. Sanada states that regardless of the result of the duel, they will no longer bother the Tokugawa shogunate ever again. Azumi, questioning whether she had ever been following a path of her own or if she and her friends had always been being used, accepts the duel. Azumi slays Sanada in their duel. Out of respect for his father, Yukimura tells their forces to allow Azumi to leave unmolested, and talks Kanbei out of avenging his master. Upon confirming from Tenkai that the war is over and her mission has concluded, Azumi silently departs the battlefield, ignoring Kanbei when he inquires where she's going. She leaves to parts unknown.

== Cast ==
- Aya Ueto as Azumi
- Yuma Ishigaki as Nagara
- Chiaki Kuriyama as Kozue
- Shun Oguri as Ginkaku
- Yoshio Harada as Gessai
- Mikijirō Hira as Sanada Masayuki
- Toshiya Nagasawa as Sanada Yukimura
- Kazuki Kitamura as Kanbê Inoue
- Kenichi Endō as Kinkaku
- Reiko Takashima as Kunio
- Tak Sakaguchi as Tsuchigumo
- Kai Shishido as Hanzō
- Shigeru Kōyama as Tenkai Nankōbō
- Eugene Nomura as Samurai Z
- Ai Maeda as Chiyo
- Yukitomo Tochino as Rice Shop Owner

== Release ==
Azumi 2 - Death or Love was released in Japan on March 12, 2005, where it was distributed by Toho. The film was released in the United Kingdom directly to home video in 2005.
