= Magic Bullet Chronicles Ryukendo =

- 魔弾戦記リュウケンドー
- Also known as: Madan Senki Ryukendo
- Genre: Superhero tokusatsu Action; Science fiction Comedy; Magic; Tokusatsu
- Created by: Oji Hiroi; Yūichirō Hira; Yuzuru Miyauchi; Tsuyoshi Yoshida
- Starring: Shogo Yamaguchi; Gen; Kouhei Kuroda
- Opening theme: "Madan Senki Ryukendo" by Hiroshi Kitadani "GO! Ryukendo" by Kenji Ohtsuki
- Ending theme: "EVERYBODY GOES" by Nanase Aikawa "Beautiful" by Mariko Shibano "Prism of Eyes" by MAX "Zutto Zutto Zutto" by Mariko Shibano
- Composer: Michiru Oshima
- Country of origin: Japan
- No. of episodes: 50+2 specials (list of episodes)

Production
- Executive producers: Tōru Kuroda; Hiroshi Takegawa
- Producers: Hitoshi Nakajima; Yūto Suzuki
- Running time: 24-25 minutes (per episode)
- Production company: We've Inc

Original release
- Network: TV Aichi, TV Tokyo
- Release: January 8 – December 31, 2006

Magic Bullet Chronicles Ryukendo (魔(ま)弾(だん)戦(せん)記(き)リュウケンドー, Madan Senki Ryūkendō) is a Japanese superhero-genre television drama. It was Takara and We've Inc's first attempt at a tokusatsu series. This series aired at 7:00 JST on TV Aichi from January 8 to December 31, 2006. It is also a partial prequel to the Tomica Hero Series, the cast reprising their characters in the Tomica Hero Rescue Force movie.

== Plot ==
Akebono City is a peaceful community overflowing with humanity. Since there was a Power Spot that released magical power in the community, the people were distressed by the threat of the demon army Jamanga, who are gathering Minus Energy (マイナスエネルギー, Mainasu Enerugī) from the frightened masses for a sinister purpose: to revive their leader. The secret organization SHOT was formed to protect the people of the community from the Jamanga, concealing their existence as ordinary members of the Akebono Police Station, which considers demons beyond their jurisdiction. Kenji Narukami, a practitioner of the Narukami Dragon God Style (鳴神龍神流, Narukami Ryū Jin Ryū) for fighting demons, arrives to Akebono to fight the demons, eventually getting his wish when he is transformed to Ryukendo and faces off against Jamanga's forces together with his friends in order to restore peace in the community.

== Characters ==
=== Magic Bullet Warriors ===
The Magic Bullet Warriors (魔弾戦士, Madan Senshi): Ryuguno, Ryukendo, and Ryujino

Each warrior has a set of keys to either use an attack or summon a Beast King (獣王, JūŌ), an animal spirit of the Earth. When Kenji and Jushiro become God Ryukendo and Magna Ryuguno, their Beast Kings are strengthened into a Super Beast King (超獣王, Chō Jū Ō) form each.

==== Magic Bullet Fencer Ryukendo ====
Kenji Narukami (鳴神剣二)/Magic Bullet Fencer (魔弾剣士, MaDan Kenshi) Ryukendo ("Ryukendo" translates from "Dragon Sword Way"), the series' title protagonist, moves to Akebono and is mistaken for a demon upon arrival. After defending a dog in the street, he finds himself confronting a Demon Beast, being chosen by GekiRyuKen and becoming Ryukendo. Since then, he works at SHOT, saving the day more often than not. He is trained in the Narukami Ryujinryu technique. By inserting the RyuKen Key into GekiRyuKen, Kenji can synchronize with GekiRyuKen to transform into Ryukendo—the transformation call is Shooting Dragon Transformation (撃龍変身, GekiRyū Henshin). Brave Leon (ブレイブレオン, Bureibu Reon) is Ryukendo's lion Beast King, which can turn into the three-wheeled Leon Trike (レオントライク, Reon Toraiku) motorcycle. His Final Break (ファイナルブレーク, Finaru Burēku) finishing move activated by the Final Key, is the Magic Bullet Slash (魔弾斬り, MaDan Giri). When GekiRyuKen absorbs the combined powers of Ryuguno, Ryujino, and the Jamanga GrimGoblin, he evolves into God GekiRyuKen. By transforming after GekiRyuKen's evolution, Ryukendo becomes God Ryukendo (ゴッドリュウケンドー, Goddo Ryūkendō). His Magic Bullet Keys are also upgraded as well, while his Beast King becomes God Leon (ゴッドレオン, Goddo Reon). His finishing move is Dragon King Magic Bullet Slash (龍王魔弾斬り, Ryū Ō MaDan Giri).

- Fire Ryukendo (ファイヤーリュウケンドー, Faiyā Ryūkendō) (Transformation call: Blazing Armament (火炎武装, Kaen Busō)) is Ryukendo's first powered-up form, activated by the Fire Key. The Beast King of this form is the gorilla-themed Fire Kong (ファイヤーコング, Faiyā Kongu), which becomes a set of cannons. Fire Ryukendo utilizes a variety of flame-based attacks. His finishing move is Blazing Slash (火炎斬り, Kaen Giri). When Ryukendo becomes God Ryukendo, his Fire Key is upgraded into the Burning Key, resulting in his Fire Ryukendo transformation becoming Burning Ryukendo (バーニングリュウケンドー, Bāningu Ryūkendō), complete with Fire Kong becoming Burning Kong (バーニングコング, Bāningu Kongu). His finishing move is Exploding Flaming Slash (爆炎斬り, Bakuen Giri).
- Aqua Ryukendo (アクアリュウケンドー, Akua Ryūkendō) (Transformation call: Freezing Armament (氷結武装, Hyōketsu Busō)) is Ryukendo's second powered-up form, activated by the Aqua Key. Aqua Shark (アクアシャーク, Akua Shāku) is Ryukendo's JuuOh in this form, which can turn into a hoverboard, and Ryukendo has powers over water and ice. His finishing move is Freezing Slash (氷結斬り, Hyōketsu Giri). When God Ryukendo uses the Aqua Key's Blizzard Key form, his Aqua Ryukendo transformation is now Blizzard Ryukendo (ブリザードリュウケンドー, Burizādo Ryūkendō). In this form, his Beast King is Blizzard Shark (ブリザードシャーク, Burizādo Shāku) and his finishing move is Exploding Freezing Slash (爆氷斬り, Bakuhyō Giri).
- When Kenji first used his Thunder Ryukendo (サンダーリュウケンドー, Sandā Ryūkendō) (Transformation call: Thunder Armament (雷鳴武装, Raimei Busō)) form, he found himself unable to transform. Eventually though, he not only got the Thunder Key working, but also found his Thunder Ryukendo transformation's Beast King, Thunder Eagle (サンダーイーグル, Sandā Īguru), which becomes a wing-pack for Ryukendo. Thunder Ryukendo's powers include lightning and electricity, and his finishing move is the Thunder Slash (雷鳴斬り, Raimei Giri). When God Ryukendo used this form, Lightning Ryukendo (ライトニングリュウケンドー, Raitoningu Ryūkendō) is the form granted from the upgraded Thunder Key: the Lightning Key. Lightning Eagle (ライトニングイーグル, Raitoningu Īguru) is Lightning Ryukendo's Beast King, and his finishing move is Exploding Lightning Slash (爆雷斬り, Bakurai Giri).
- Ultimate Ryukendo (アルティメットリュウケンドー, Arutimetto Ryūkendō) is a gold and silver power-up that made its appearance in episode 45. It was activated through the use of the Ultimate Key found in Rock Crimson's body. Ultimate Ryukendo is powered by the Ultimate Dragon, which attaches to God GekiRyuKen. His suit is white-and-gold, with a gray visor and a blue crystal on his chest. Ultimate Ryukendo can combine the four Beast Kings to create the more powerful Raijin Dragon (ライジンリュウ, Raijin Ryū).

In the series aftermath, with GekiRyuKen gone, Kenji resumes being a normal police officer, arresting Dr. Mad.

==== Magic Bullet Musketeer Ryuguno ====
Jushiro Fudo (不動銃四郎, Fudō Jūshirō)/Magic Bullet Musketeer Ryuguno (魔弾銃士リュウガンオー, MaDan Jūshi Ryūgan'ō) made his entrance before Ryukendo, sending an army of Tsukaima to a quick defeat. He really doesn't like it when people call him "Old Man", a nickname that Kenji started despite the fact that Jushiro is only 25 years old. It was eventually revealed that Jushiro and Kenji are a combination destined by fate.

Jushiro and GouRyuGun have a strong bond, much closer than that of Kenji and GekiRyuKen at first. When he inserts the RyuGun Key into GouRyuGun, he can synchronize with GouRyuGun to transform into Ryuguno - the transformation call is Firm Dragon Transformation (剛龍変身, GōRyū Henshin). His Shot Key allows him to use a rapid-fire attack called "Dragon Shot" (ドラゴンショット, Doragon Shotto), and his Final Key activates his finishing attack, the Dragon Cannon (ドラゴンキャノン, Doragon Kyanon), which releases a hundred of GouRyuGun's regular shots in one powerful blast in the shape of a fiery dragon. His JuuOh is Buster Wolf (バスターウルフ, Basutā Urufu), a wolf JuuOh. Buster Wolf can transform into a motorcycle known as Wolf Bike.

When Jushiro loses GouRyuGun in an attack from Bloody's UFO, GouRyuGun is recreated as the Magic Bullet Magnum (マダンマグナム, Madan Magunamu), allowing Jushiro to assume the corresponding stronger form of Magna Ryuguno (マグナリュウガンオー, Maguna Ryūgan'ō). He can also fire rapid-shots from GouRyuGun and the Magic Bullet Magnum simultaneously, known as the 'Double Shot'. Magna Wolf (マグナウルフ, Maguna Urufu) is Magna Ryuguno's Beast King, transforming into the Magna Bike (マグナバイク, Maguna Baiku). Magna Ryugunou's finishing move is Magna Dragon Cannon (マグナドラゴンキャノン, Maguna Doragon Kyanon).

In Episode 50, with some of Kenji's power, Magna Ryugunou becomes Ultimate Ryuguno (アルティメットリュウガンオー, Arutimetto Ryūgan'ō), a golden-armor transformation. His finishing attack in this form is the "Ultimate Dragon Cannon". His Beast King in this form is Ultimate Wolf (アルティメットウルフ, Arutimetto Urufu). In the series aftermath, with GouRyuGun gone, Jushiro resumes being a normal police officer, arresting Dr. Mad.

==== Magic Bullet Fighter Ryujino ====
Koichi Shiranami (白波鋼一, Shiranami Koichi)/Magic Bullet Fighter Ryujino (魔弾闘士リュウジンオー, MaDan Tōshi Ryūjin'ō; 14-52) isn't a member of SHOT but rather a mysterious wanderer, armed with ZanRyuJin. He's not on the side of the Jamanga either, as he demonstrated in his high-octane entrance battle with Lady Gold. Eventually, he comes to work with Kenji and Jushiro. Koichi lived in England when he was a kid, and Commander Amachi of SHOT wanted his parents to work on the Madan Suits for Ryukendo and Ryuguno. Koichi lost his parents in the explosion, but kept his mother's pendant. He stole the Madan Ryu Core to give himself the power of a Madan warrior to avenge his parents, swearing a vendetta on SHOT until he learned that it was Baron Bloody who caused his parents' deaths. When he inserts the RyuJin Key into ZanRyuJin, the weapon synchronizes with the Madan Ryu Core to transform him into Ryujino - the transformation call is Slashing Dragon Transformation (斬龍変身, ZanRyū Henshin). When Beyond Dark revived spirits of the dead, Koichi gave his mother a heath flower he brought from Kaori, and realized that he needs to fight for himself, not for revenge.

Ryujino can turn ZanRyuJin from a halberd into a bow with the use of the Archery Key. His finishing move, activated by the Final Key, is Rampage (乱撃, RanGeki) in Axe Mode and Dance (乱舞, RanBu) in Archery Mode. His Beast King is the raven Delta Shadow (デルタシャドウ, Deruta Shadō), which combines with Ryujino to give him the power of flight. Later, Delta Shadow gains the ability to turn into the Shadow Bike (シャドウバイク, Shadō Baiku).

In Episode 50, with some of Kenji's power, Ryujino transforms into Ultimate Ryujino (アルティメットリュウジンオー, Arutimetto Ryūjin'ō), a golden-armor transformation. His Beast King in this form is Ultimate Shadow (アルティメットシャドウ, Arutimetto Shadō). In the series aftermath, with ZanRyuJin gone, Koichi takes up work as a delivery boy for Kaori, arriving on the scene as his teammates arrested Dr. Mad.

==== Master Ryukendo ====
Master Ryukendo (マスターリュウケンドー, Mastā Ryūkendō; 47, 50) is an ancient Magic Bullet warrior who with his two allies fought against DaiMaOu in the first war. Unable to defeat DaiMaOu, as only Master Ryukendo went Ultimate, he and his allies combined with the dragons of light and Master Ryukendo became the Madan Ryu Core of GekiRyuKen, his allies becoming GouRyuGun, and ZanRyuJin, so the three could help the next generation. DaiMaOu was reduced to an egg and somehow obtained the three Ultimate Keys, and storing them in Rock Crimson, Lady Gold, and Baron Bloody's bodies, making them immortal. The Canon of light returned Master Ryukendo back to normal, with no memory until the Jamanga attacked. In human form, he wears ancient Japanese clothing, and his Madan Suit is similar to Ryukendo's, except with a cape and bronze accents. He wields a weapon similar to GekiRyuKen, except it uses no keys and dragon head, instead with a diamond replacing the dragon head and chanting Shadu Iraki Yuza to summon his sword and transform. Master Ryukendo showed Kenji the Ultimate Madan Slash before returning into GekiRyuken with no memory of the incident. By episode 50, however, GekiRyuKen recovered his memories as Master Ryukendo and emerged from GekiRyuKen encouraging Kenji to not give up hope, as well as teaching him the method to defeat DaiMaOu once and for all.

==== Magic Bullet Keys ====
Magic Bullet Keys (魔弾キー, MaDan Kī) are used by both the Magic Bullet Warriors and the Jamanga. The Warriors use them for transformation into Warrior form, weapon-summoning, Beast King-summoning and finishing abilities. Among the Keys are:

- RyuKen Key
- Final Key
- Fire Key
- Kong Key
- Aqua Key
- Thunder Key
- Eagle Key
- Dagger key
- Knuckle key
- RyuGun Key
- Shot Key
- RyuJin Key
- Ultimate Key
- Archery Key

=== Arsenal ===
==== Ryukendo ====
- GekiRyuKen (ゲキリュウケン, GekiRyūKen) is Kenji's partner, transformation device, and primary weapon. Also used to activate the Keys that Kenji finds. Finishers include "Magic Bullet Slash" (Ryukendo), "Blazing Slash" (Fire Ryukendo), "Freezing Slash" (Aqua Ryukendo), "Thunder Lightning Slash" (Thunder Ryukendo). GekiRyuken was later powered-up into God GekiRyuken (ゴッドゲキリュウケン, Goddo Gekiryūken), a sword-and-shield combo, similar to Kamen Rider Knight Survive's Dark Visor Zwei from Kamen Rider Ryuki. Finishers include "RyuuOu MaDan Slash", "Exploding Burning Slash" (Burning Ryukendo), "Exploding Freezing Slash" (Blizzard Ryukendo) and "Exploding Lightning Slash" (Lightning Ryukendo). God GekiRyuKen was sacrificed to seal the Power Spot at the end of the series.
- The Ultimate Dragon (アルティメットドラゴン, Arutimetto Doragon) is a golden dragon that attaches to God GekiRyuKen to create Ultimate GekiRyuKen. Called forth by the Ultimate Key, transforming Kenji into Ultimate Ryukendo. The dragon's body attaches to the shield and the tail to the sword. God GekiRyuKen Ultimate Mode uses the finisher "Ultimate MaDan Slash".
- The Twin Edge GekiRyuKen (ツインエッジゲキリュウケン, Tsuin Ejji Gekiryūken) is a double-edged sword made from the Magic Bullet Dagger and GekiRyuKen. Each of its finishers is a "Super" version of GekiRyuKen's own.
- The small Magic Bullet Dagger (マダンダガー, MaDan Dagā) was used when Kenji couldn't figure out how to reveal his latest Key. Jushiro went down into the power spot and brought the Dagger Key to life. He gave it to Kenji, who was fighting Rock Crimson on the surface. The Dagger is similar to GekiRyuKen and attacks with "Dagger Spiral Chain", or combines with GekiRyuKen to form Twin Edge GekiRyuKen.

==== Ryuguno ====
- GouRyuGun (ゴウリュウガン, GōRyūGan) is Jushiro's partner, transformation device, and primary weapon. He has a robotic voice and used primarily as a gun, but a small blade can be extended from the bottom for close-range combat. Finishers include "Dragon Shot" and "Dragon Cannon", although the latter wasn't gained until Jushiro achieved it in Episode 6. GouRyuGun was destroyed by Bloody's UFO in Episode 23, and returned in Episode 27 when Jushiro became Magna Ryuguno. GouRyuGun was sacrificed to seal the Power Spot at the end of the series.
- The Magna GouRyuGun (マグナゴウリュウガン, Maguna Gōryūgan) is formed by combining GouRyuGun with the MaDan Magnum. Magna Ryuguno's combined weapon. It's so powerful that Magna Ryuguno must hold it in both hands. Its finisher is the extremely strong "Magna Dragon Cannon."
- The Madan Magnum (マダンマグナム, Madan Magunamu) is a small gun with knife, similar to the Madan Dagger, used by Magna Ryuguno. It can attach to the GouRyuGun to make the Magna GouRyuGun.

==== Ryujino ====
- ZanRyuJin (ザンリュウジン, ZanRyūJin) is Koichi's partner, transformation device and weapon. Extremely talkative. Unlike the GekiRyuKen and GouRyuGun, the ZanRyuJin is worn as a brace, rather than around the belt. It serves as a battle axe for the most part, but a second mode, Archery Mode, fires fast-moving arrows at enemy targets. ZanRyuJin's attacks are "RanGeki" in Axe Mode and "RanBu" in Archery Mode. ZanRyuJin was sacrificed to seal the Power Spot at the end of the series.

==== Generic ====
- The Magic Bullet Knuckle (マダンナックル, MaDan Nakkuru) is summoned by the Knuckle Key, it can be used by any of the three Warriors as their wrist pad transforms into a powerful, long-distance blaster. Its primary attack is the "Knuckle Spark".
- The Magic Bullet Key Holder (マダンキーホルダー, MaDan Kī Horudā) is worn around the waist of the Magic Bullet Warriors, calling forth the appropriate Key for any situation. Ryukendo's is blue, Ryuguno's: red, and Ryujino's: black.

=== SHOT ===
SHOT, the Shoot Hell Obduracy Troopers, are the anti-demon force in Akebono. Since nobody believed that demons even exist, SHOT keeps itself in secret, placing their base beneath the Akebono police station through a special elevator that only its members know of. There are only four members in the Akebono branch, not counting the Madan Warriors. The police force is probably the best place to hide SHOT, because Akebono's real police force is hideously incompetent.

- Yuya Amachi (天地 裕也, Amachi Yūya): Commander of SHOT, he poses as the "janitor" at the police station. Koichi Shiranami, Ryujinou, believed that Amachi had killed his parents, when in reality Amachi had protected a young Koichi from the explosion caused at the Madan Suits European Testing Facility.
- Rin Sakyou (左京 鈴, Sakyō Rin): SHOT's operator and secretary at the Akebono Police Station. Had a brother, now deceased, who sought to protect the fireflies at his lake so that Rin could be happy. Appears to be close to Kenji, even though he couldn't get her name right when they first met. But she has deep feelings for him. When she was asked for a marriage interview by the mayor's only son Hiroshi, she was the one who was very angry on Kenji for allowing her to date Hiroshi San. She is very kind and caring as well as very bad tempered.
- Kiichi Setoyama (瀬戸山 喜一, Setoyama Kiichi): SHOT's Magical Engineer, who sends the Keys and reads the writings that bring about developments against Jamanga in the Canon of Light. He doesn't really know anything, but does serve as a gateway between the Canon of Light and SHOT's purposes.
- Professor Mikuriya (御厨博士, Mikuriya Hakase): A professor of magic that Kiichi respects.

=== Allies and civilians ===
- Kaori Nose (野瀬 かおり, Nose Kaori): A florist that Kenji met on his first day in Akebono. She is Kenji's love interest too. But later in the series she developed feelings for Shiranami Koichi and Kenji for Rin. Later on, she was tricked by Lady Gold into believing that Ryukendo had cut down Ichiko and Ritsuko. There appears to be a romantic relationship going on between the two, since Kenji got jealous when Koichi neared her to get flowers for drawing out a Jamanga demon. Kaori was chosen as the leader of the Akebono vigilante group when she "won" the martial arts tournament (due to all of her opponents forfeiting when they refused to attack her). In episode 50 she turns into a Tsukaima and also thanks Kenji for defeating the demon probably knowing that Kenji is Ryukendo.
- Komachi Kurihara (栗原 小町, Kurihara Komachi): A lady ghost in white that only those with a passion for justice, like Kenji and GekiRyuKen, can see. This doesn't do much for their reputation. She's actually a spirit of the first Head of the Akebono Police, a female detective. She assisted Kenji in his first fight against Jack Moon. When spirits were being resurrected, she lived again, and delayed giving Kenji the Akebono flower needed to defeat the demon. She left with the other spirits, but returned as she still wants to hang around. Komachi managed to gather enough energy to help Ryukendo out once in a while, as well as encourage the chief of police, to resume his old way of thinking in terms of justice.
- Ichiko Nakazaki (中崎 市子, Nakazaki Ichiko) & Ritsuko Takakura (高倉 律子, Takakura Ritsuko): A pair of lively, somewhat incompetent lady cops in Akebono that try to keep the town's peace. More often than not become victims of Jamanga's latest plan, though they are the only cops who actually attempt to fight the demons on a regular basis with a ridiculous supply of firearms ranging from standard police rifles and pistols to a bazooka and SWAT cannon. While Ritsuko was on vacation, Ichiko developed feelings for Rock Crimson before he recovered his memory.
- Umi Saionji (西園寺 海, Saionji Umi): Kenji's fiancée, also trained in the Narukami Ryuujinryu technique. She occasionally visits Akebono, leaving Rin to watch over him. Was the one to inform Akebono of the Martial Arts tournament. Introduced in episode 10. She also knows the true identity of the Madan Warriors.
- Maria(28): is one of Bloody's Jamadroids that was taken in by SHOT and removed of her battle systems. She obeyed Jushiro's orders only, but never seemed to smile. When the Jamadroid control tower's barrier had trapped Jushiro, Maria rushed in and took his place in the barrier, allowing Jushiro to finish off the tower and delete all the androids. In her final moments, she smiled at last.

=== Jamanga ===
The army of demons called Jamanga serves as the principle enemy of the SHOT organization and the Madan Warriors. Their main purpose is to gather minus energy that is created when humans are in despair to resurrect their leader, Daimaou GrenGhost.

- Daimaou GrenGhost (大魔王グレンゴースト, Daimaō GurenGōsuto; 1-50): Jamanga's "King of Demons" who fought Master Ryukendo long ago and lost enough energy to regress into a green orb-like egg hovering in the eternally black sky of the area where the Jamanga armies reside. Only when enough Minus Energy, brought about by negative human emotions, is collected, can he be revived. Though he was successfully revived, emerging from his egg to evade Ultimate Ryukendo, GrenGhost was in a larval state and attempt to fully mature at the metal factory, but was easily killed by Ultimate Ryukendo. However, GrenGhost's soul survived and absorbed Worm to create a new human-like body until he possess enough excess power from Ultimate Ryukendo taping into the Power Spot to rip out of his host and assume his true moth-like form before being destroyed by the Madan Warriors' final attack.
- Poisonous Insect Professor Dr. Worm (毒虫博士Ｄｒ．ウォーム, Dokumushi Hakase Dokutā Wōmu; 1-50): Jamanga's monster-maker, who creates Demon Beasts from the Madan Keys. He performs the menial work, such as resurrecting Rock Crimson and telling Lady Gold not to sit on his demon creation pedestal. After his friend RockCrimson was killed, Worm revealed that he knew of the Ultimate Keys and hid the fact to protect his position. With the truth exposed, he was almost killed by Lady Gold and Baron Bloody, were not for the piece of Rock Crimson on his person. While performing Rock Crimson's funeral, he invited Ryukendo and gang out of his friend's final wish, seeing the true nature of humans. But to save face as a demon and not suffer the wrath of the Jamanga, he revoked his friendship with RockCrimson and defeated the Madan Warriors singlehandedly, now even more bent on solely reviving GrenGhost and nothing else. Now driven insane by his newfound conviction, Worm allowed himself to become GrenGhost's new body, only to meet his end once GrenGhost was powerful enough to assume his true form, tearing Worm's body to pieces in the process.
- Lunar Eclipse Mask Jack Moon (月蝕仮面ジャークムーン, Gesshoku Kamen Jakku Mūn; 1-12, 21, 35-48, 51): A swordsman for Jamanga. Though he swore loyalty to GrenGhost, Jack Moon serves him because he's stronger than himself. Jack Moon's ideal were that the strong rule, refusing to destroy a foe he considers to be weaker, citing such actions as a waste of his time and energy. However, Jack Moon's demonic side has pleasure in attacking the weak. Though Ryukendo originally saw him as his rival, he came to see that Jack Moon has no actual warrior's code when he succumbed to his demonic nature and decided to attack Akebono from his Air Fortress while Ryukendo was unable to fight. After his fortress was destroyed by Thunder Ryukendo in Episode 12, Jack Moon was not seen until in Episode 21, when Baron Bloody saved him from being sacrificed to GrenGhost for betraying Jamanga. However, Jack Moon's body is dying from the conflict between his hearts and decides to his restore his honor by fighting Ryukendo on-on-one during the solar eclipse, restoring his fullpower. Though he fell the Twin Edge GekiRyuKen's Super Thunder Slash, Jack Moon was resurrected as Mechanimoon (メカニムーン, Mekanimūn), a cyborg version of himself with golden adornments to his armor and without any memories of himself and freewill, a slave under Bloody. But after GrenGhost's death, he was Jack Moon once more, and, in a final duel with Kenji under the black moonlit night of Christmas, he was defeated by the Narukami Ryuujinryu technique.
- Golden Queen Lady Gold (黄金女王レディゴールド, Ōgonjoō Redi Gōrudo; 14-48): A female warrior whose plans usually involve magic that effect the hearts of her victims as seen when she once made the entire town distrust SHOT, and invaded people's dreams with a special orb. She also has a habit of sitting on Dr. Worm's pedestal. Lady Gold usually lets her trio of personal Familiars fight in her stead. She later gains a Catwoman-like battle suit from Dr Worm when she attempt to steal back the MaDan Keys. When revealed to have Jushiro's Ultimate Key in her body, Ryukendo removes it from her before Ryuguno finally destroyed LadyGold by blasting the source of her life, her earring, to bits.
- Stone Giant Rock Crimson (岩石巨人ロッククリムゾン, Ganseki Kyojin Rokku Kurimuzon; 16, 22, 37-45): A warrior who transforms into a massive ball of stone, an old friend of Dr. Worm. Has amazing raw power, but gets set off if anybody calls him "idiot". He was broken into pieces by Ryukendo's Twin Edge GekiRyuKen, only to be revived later by Dr. Worm with Lady Gold's help, giving him a stone that allows Rock Crimson to regenerate even after he's blown to bits. It took a team effort and Fire Ryukendo with the Twin Edge GekiRyuKen to destroy RockCrimson. But using the Power Spot's magic, Rock Crimson was revived, though defeated by the three Maden Warriors, and Magna Ryuguno's trinity attack. before Dr. Worm took RockCrimson's remains to rebuild him. Rock Crimson was revealed to have Kenji's Ultimate Key in his body, unwillingly creating Ultimate Ryukendo, who defeated him once and for all.
- Bloodspray Baron Bloody (血煙伯爵ブラッディ, Chikemuri Hakushaku Buraddi; 21-41,43-48): A robotic Demon who saved JackMoon, only to use him as part of his plan. Once Jack Moon died, Bloody took JackMoon's sword and used it to eventually revive JackMoon into MechaniMoon, under his control. He made his attack on Akebono with his AsteRoids before revealing himself, intent on destroying the Maden Ryu Cores. Baron Bloody was the one responsible for killing Koichi Shiranami's parents ten years ago in an attempt to destroy the Madan RyuCores that became Gekiryuu and GouryuuGun, destroying all of Europe if he succeeded. As a result, Bloody became Koichi's mortal enemy. Bloody soon began his part with collecting Minus energy with his Jamadroids and then the construction of Grenstar. He attempted to kill Ryuujinou, but ended up being killed by him, with only his drill staff remaining. But once revived and revealed to have Koichi's Ultimate Key in his body, Bloody was finally destroyed when Ryukendo removes the key before Ryujino lands the deathblow.
- Familiars (使い魔, Tsukaima): Jamanga's never-ending supply of cannon fodder. These purple-bodied, yellow-striped, one-eyed, bat-eared soldiers appear when there's trouble to be caused. However, with the exception of special Familiars, the regular kinds are neither bright nor difficult to defeat.
  - Ganymede, Phobos and Europa, familiars to Lady Gold
  - Mecha Familiar, familiars to Baron Bloody
  - Fire Familiar (4)
  - Swordsman Familiar (4)
    - When fighting a Swordsman Familiar at Akebono Temple, it proved to be a match for Ryukendo's normal form. Ryukendo defeats it with his Fire Mode, but the Jamanga somehow took in the fire attack's source and powered up another Swordsman Familiar with Ryukendo's fire power. In this form, the Fire Familiar gains a flaming sword as well as a large shield that could move telepathically. The Fire Familiar overpowered Ryugunou and Ryukendo in his Fire Mode. Fire Ryukendo, while getting in a sword fight with the Familiar, caused large fireballs to launch and burn Akebono City. In the end, Ryugunou captures the Familiar's shield, and Ryukendo transforms into Aqua Ryukendo, destroying the Fire Familiar. Akebono City also snows from the Freezing Slash made from Aqua Ryukendo.

==== Demon Beasts ====
The Demon Beasts (魔獣, Majū) are usually created by Dr. Worm using a Madan Key as the core of the monster's form. However, Lady Gold and Baron Bloody can also create their own monsters but without Madan Keys.

- Demon Beast Reptolilix (魔獣レプトリリックス, Majū Reputoririkkusu; 1, 15): A metal-eating insect Demon Beast impervious to most blades and guns, but was killed by Ryukendo, who acquired the Fire Key from it. A 2nd red version was created by Lady Gold and shrunk so it can infect people with a virus that turns their skin into iron and cause them to lash out violently before it was destroyed by Ryujino in Shadow Wing Mode.
- Plant Demon Beast Giga Flower (植物魔獣ギガフラワー, Shokobutsu Majū Gigafurawā; 2): A flower Demon Beast that was planted by Dr. Worm in Akebono, and eventually grew to giant size under the watchful eye of a young boy, Shigeru. All it took to bring it down was Fire Ryukendo's Blazing Slash. After the battle, Kenji acquired the Aqua Key from it.
- Demon Beast Balloon Gamma (魔獣バルンガンマ, Majū Barun Ganma; 6): A balloon Demon Beast, Balloon Gamma can shoot a beam that causes people to swell up like balloons, and would've made them explode within an hour of their ballooning. With a careful eye and steady hand, Ryuguno was able to defeat it with his new weapon at the time, Dragon Cannon.
- Demon Beast Meganōma (魔獣メガノーマ, Majū Meganōma; 7, 25): A monster who attacked with large weights, causing general havoc around Akebono before being defeated by Fire Ryukendo and Fire Kong's Fire Cannon. MegaNouma was later revived with Rock Crimson's Regeneration Key and defeated by Ryujinou and Aqua Ryukendo.
- Demon Beast Edenoid (魔獣エドノイド, Majū Edonoido; 8, 25): A gillman Demon Beast, sent to pollute Akebono's water. He couldn't be detected whenever he's underwater, but it was revealed that his body temperature was much higher than normal, allowing him to slip by. Defeated by Aqua Ryukendo's Freezing Slash from atop the Aqua Board. Later revived with Rock Crimson's Regeneration Key and defeated by Ryujinou and Aqua Ryukendo.
- Demon Beast Voldark (魔獣ヴァルダーク, Majū Vorudāku; 9): A Demon Beast modeled after Kanon, it uses its singing to bring people to pain though only the Akebono Shrinebell can negate the sound wave. Destroyed by Fire Ryukendo's Blazing Slash.
- Demon Beast Anomalocaris (魔獣アノマロカリス, Majū Anomarokarisu; 10): A swarm of Demon Beasts that Dr. Worm created after the pre-historic monster of the same name, developing a name for themselves by bitting off the tops of things and attack people's heads. The entire swarm was frozen by Aqua Ryukendo's Freezing Slash.
- Elemoon (エレムーン, Eremūn; 11): A Jack Moon clone powered by the Thunder Key, created on Jack Moon's request to Dr. Worm by giving him using a piece of his flesh. Being a copy of Jack Moon, Elemoon had half of his "father's" power augmented with the Thunder Key, and used his blade as a rifle. Though he gathered mass amounts of minus energy, SHOT managed to trap Elemoon in tank Dr. Worm had been driving in Episode 3, only for him to fully use the Thunder Key to get out. However, the power the key had proved too much for Elemoon as it killed him to Jack Moon's annoyance for his lowly clone to be put in such a predicament in the first place.
- Demon Beast Beyonder (魔獣ビヨンダー, Majū Biyondāku; 19, 25): A ghost-like Demon Beast that brought the spirits of the dead back to life, able to become intangible yet has a weakness for sunlight. Once rendered tangible, Ryukendo uses the Twin Edge GekiRyuKen to kill it. Dr. Worm later revived Beyonder as Beyondark (ビヨンダーク, Biyondāku), only to be defeated by Ryujino and Aqua Ryukendo.
- Demon Beast Guckus (魔獣グッケス, Majū Gukkesu; 20): A Lizard-like Demon Beast that steals items of sentimental value to increase his power, the Goryu Key being one of them. Once forcing the monster to sneeze everything out of his stomach, Ryuguno finishes the Demon Beast off with his Trinity Dragon Cannon.
- Asteroid (アストロイド, Asutoroido; 23-24): A series of androids created by Bloody, the first encountered posed as an alien named Angela with claims to protect people. Once revealed in its true form, Asteroid was destroyed by the Trinity Madan Slash. In following episode, more Asteroids were brought on Akebono in Angela's image, searching for the Madan Ryu Cores. Only one of them assumed its true form to fight Jushiro and be destroyed by Ryukendo's Madan Slash.
- Demon Beast Bacchal (魔獣バチャル, Majū Bacharu; 27): A giant clam Demon Beast who can create an alternate realm of Akebono city and trap children there using a computer game icon as the entrance gate. He used human-size illusions of himself until they were defeated and he revealed himself. Defeated by Magna Ryuguno's Magna Dragon Cannon, causing his dimension to fade in the process.
- Demon Beast Grem Goblin (魔獣グレムゴブリン, Majū Guremu Goburin; 29): A Demon Beast created from a part of Daimaou's body, to attack the Madan Warriors directly. He was able to defeat Magna Ryuguno and take GekiRyuKen as his own. However, the sword's power when out of control as Grem Goblin used it to absorb Magna Ryuguno and Ryujino's attacks until Kenji reclaims it. Grem Goblin was the first to be defeated by God Ryukendo's RyuuOu Madan Slash.
- Demon Beast Mazerome (魔獣メイズローム, Majū Meizurōmu; 30): A giant Demon Beast that targets indecisive people, teleporting them to her tunnel-like stomach, chasing them with a smaller version of herself. Her human-size aspect was surprisingly defeated by Ichiko & Ritsuko, while the actual Mazerome was killed by GodRyukendo and GodLeon's Trinity RyuuOu Madan Slash.
- Demon Beast Jamind (魔獣ジャマインド, Majū Jamaindo; 32): A goofy-looking buddhist elephant Demon Beast who can play with human hearts. The beams of the four eyes on its trunk have a different effect: Yellow bring out happiness, blue bring fear, red brings anger and green brings sadness. Defeated by God Ryukendo's RyuuOu Madan Slash.
- Demon Beast Facethief (魔獣フェイスシーフ, Majū Feisushīfu; 33): A demon that uses mirrors to travel instantly to parts of Akebono and place cursed masks on people's heads. Defeated by Ryujino's Trinity RanBu attack.
- Demon Beast Umbrella (魔獣アンブレラ, Majū Anburera; 34): Created from Kobashiri's umbrella, filled with its owner's jealousy. Sent to Akebono Tower to blanket the shopping district and infect people with jealousy. Defeated by Burning Cannon/Trinity Exploding Slash combo.
- Demon Beast Macode (魔獣マコード, Majū Makōdo; 36): A Demon Beast that has a super soft body with rockhard armor, able to withstand mostly any attack on it. Though defeated in the first round by Komachi's interference, Macode was frozen/destroyed by Blizzard Ryukendo's Exploding Freezing Slash.
- Magical Satellite Grenstar (魔法衛星グレンスター, Mahō Eisei Gurensutā; 39): A team effort by Dr. Worm and Baron Bloody to create a satellite to not only destroy the Madan Warriors, but to ensure no one else would dare challenge them in any way. Destroyed by Lightning Ryukendo's Exploding Lightning Slash.
- Demon Beast Nemanon (魔獣ネマノン, Majū Nemanon) (40): A shape-shifting Demon Beast created by Dr Worm using two Madan Keys that copied the attacks of Ryukendo and Ryuguno, to create a monster with their combined powers. However, it didn't come out as intended so Worm gave the "horrid thing" to Lady Gold, who used the "cute" Nemanon's transforming power to cause chaos and confusion among the townsfolk. When GodRyukendo and MagnaRyuguno fought him, Nemanon assumed their forms, but only use the attacks the Madan Keys recorded. After being defeated by Ryuguno, Nemanon removed his cloak and assumed his true fighting form, only to be destroyed by God Ryukendo's Trinity RyuuOu Madan Slash.
- Magic Pot (魔法鍋, Mahō Nabe; 42): A Demon Beast created by Lady Gold and destroyed by Blizzard Ryukendo's Exploding Freezing Slash.
- Mobile Fortress Majuuki (移動要塞マジューキ, Idō Yōsai Majūki; 43): A machine created by Baron Bloody of using the pure steel that Akebono Tower is made of, the Madan Warriors were unable to use their final attacks as long as Rin was still inside the monster's body. Rin was rescued before Lightning Ryukendo destroyed Majuuki using his Exploding Lightning Slash, restoring it to its original form.
- Gunneroid (ガンナーロイド, Gannāroido; 46): A snipping machine created by Baron Bloody to kill the Madan Warriors and Dr. Worm. Gunneroid failed to kill them as it was destroyed by Trinity Magna Dragon Cannon.

== Episodes ==
1. This is the Hero! (これがヒーローだ, Kore ga Hīrō da!)
2. Burn! Become a Flame! (燃えろ！炎になれ！, Moero! Honō ni Nare!)
3. Dash! King of Beasts (走れ！百獣の王！, Hashire! Hyakujū no Ō!)
4. Freezing Armament! Aqua Ryukendo (氷結武装！アクアリュウケンドー！, Hyōketsu Busō! Akua Ryūkendō!)
5. That Guy's the Rival (あいつがライバルだ, Aitsu ga Raibaru da)
6. Single Blow Certain Victory! Dragon Cannon! (一撃必勝！ドラゴンキャノン！, Ichigeki Hisshō! Doragon Kyanon!)
7. I Summon You! Gorilla JuuOh! (召喚！ゴリラ獣王！, Shōkan! Gorira Jūō!)
8. The Demon Hidden in the Water (水にひそむ魔, Mizu ni Hisomu Ma)
9. Ring On, Bell of Friendship (響け、友情の鐘, Hibike, Yūjō no Kane)
10. The Monster from the West (西から来た怪物, Nishi kara Kita Kaibutsu)
11. The Thunder Key's Power (サンダーキーの力, Sandā Kī no Chikara)
12. Forbidden Activation! Thunder Ryukendo! (禁断の発動！サンダーリュウケンドー！, Kindan no Hatsudō! Sandā Ryūkendō!)
13. A Time-Surpassing Meeting (時を超えためぐり逢い, Toki o Koeta Meguriai)
14. The New Enemy (新たなる敵, Aratanaru Teki)
15. Fear Squirming in the Darkness (闇にうごめく恐怖, Yami ni Ugomeku Kyōfu)
16. Enemy? Friend? (敵か？仲間か？, Teki ka? Nakama ka?)
17. How About a Nightmare? (悪夢はいかが？, Akumu wa Ikaga?)
18. Sealed Wings! Thunder Eagle! (封印されし翼！サンダーイーグル！, Fūinsareshi Tsubasa! Sandā Īguru!)
19. Revived Demons (復活の魔, Fukkatsu no Ma)
20. Fudo's Agonizing Day (不動サン受難の日, Fudō-san Junan no Nichi)
21. Farewell, Moonlight Swordsman (さらば月光の剣士, Saraba Gekkō no Kenshi)
22. Martial Arts Conference in Town (ご町内武道大会, Gochōnai Budōtaikai)
23. Visitor From Outer Space (宇宙からの訪問者, Uchū kara no Hōmonsha)
24. Great Decisive Aerial Battle! (空中大決戦！, Kūchū Daikessen!)
25. DaiMaOh's Egg (大魔王の卵, Daimaō no Tamago)
26. SHOT Special Course! Who's the Champion (ＳＨＯＴスペシャル講習！優勝者は誰だ, Shotto Supesharu Kōshū! Yūshōsha wa Dare da)
27. Power Up! Magna Ryuguno! (パワーアップ！マグナリュウガンオー！, Pawā Appu! Maguna Ryūgan'ō!)
28. Direct to the Machine's Heart (機械じかけの心, Kikai Jikake no Kokoro)
29. Birth! God Ryukendo!! (誕生！ゴッドリュウケンドー！！, Tanjō! Goddo Ryūkendō!!)
30. Tunnel of Perplexity (迷いのトンネル, Mayoi no Tonneru)
31. The Akebono Great Incident! (あけぼの町最大の事件！, Akebono-cho Saidai no Jiken!)
32. Shiranami, you Laughed (白波おおいに笑う, Shiranami Ōi ni Warau)
33. Trinity! Ryujinou's New Power (三位一体！リュウジンオーの新たな力, Sanmiittai! Ryūjin'ō no Arata na Chikara)
34. The World's Largest Umbrella (世界最大のアンブレラ, Sekai Saidai no Anburera)
35. Targeted Akebono Stage (狙われたあけぼのステージ, Nerawareta Akebono Sutēji)
36. The Fighting Ghost (戦う幽霊, Tatakau Yūrei)
37. The Yellow Ring of Happiness (幸福の黄色いリング, Kōfuku no Kiiroi Ringu)
38. Rescue the SHOT Base! (ＳＨＯＴ基地を救え！, Shotto Kichi o Sukue!)
39. The Wings of Light Whirl to the Stars (光の翼が星に舞う, Hikari no Tsubasa ga Hoshi ni Mau)
40. Worst Maneuvers in History!? (史上悪の作戦！？, Shijōsai no Sakusen!?)
41. Ryujino Becomes a Doll (人形になったリュウジンオー, Ningyō ni Natta Ryūjin'ō)
42. Magical Recipe (魔法のレシピ, Mahō no Reshipi)
43. My Hero (わたしのヒーロー, Watashi no Hīrō)
44. Akebono City is Closed (閉ざされたあけぼの町, Tozasareta Akebono-cho)
45. All Jamanga Appear! Superior Maneuver (ジャマンガ幹部総登場！頂上作戦, Jamanga Kanbu Sō Tōjō! Chōjō Sakusen)
46. The Fourth Target (四人目の標的, Yoninme no Hyōteki)
47. The Mysterious Dragon Warrior (謎の龍戦士, Nazo no Ryū Senshi)
48. Ultimate Armament! Ultimate Ryukendo! (究極武装！アルティメットリュウケンドー！, Kyūkyoku Busō! Arutimetto Ryūkendō!)
49. DaiMaOh Revived! Never Ending Battle (大魔王復活！終わりなき戦い, DaiMaŌ Fukkatsu! Owarinaki Tatakai)
50. The Key That Opens the Future (未来をひらく鍵, Mirai o Hiraku Kagi)
51. The Black Moonlight Night of Christmas (黒い月夜のクリスマス, Kuroi Tsukiyo no Kurisumasu)
52. Farewell, Madan Warriors! (さらば魔弾戦士！, Saraba Madan Senshi!)

=== Specials ===
- Twin Edge God GekiRyuKen Version (ツインエッジゴッドゲキリュウケン発動（バージョン）, Tsuin Ejji Goddo Gekiryūken Bājon)
- Ryujinou Gunman (Magna) Ryuguno (魔弾銃士（マグナ）リュウガンオー, Madan Jūshi (Maguna) Ryūgan'ō)

== Cast ==
- Kenji Narukami/Ryukendo: Shogo Yamaguchi (山口翔悟, Yamaguchi Shogo)
- Gekiryuken: Kenji Nojima (野島 健児, Nojima Kenji) (Voice)
- Jushiro Fudo/Ryuguno: Gen (源, Gen)
- Gouryugun: Yasunori Masutani (増谷 康紀, Masutani Yasunori) (Voice)
- Koichi Shiranami/Ryujino: Kouhei Kuroda (黒田耕平)
- Zandryujin: Masaya Onosaka (小野坂 昌也, Onosaka Masaya) (Voice)
- Yuuya Amachi: Kei Shimizu (清水圭, Shimizu Kei)
- Rin Sakyou: Kumi Imura (井村空美, Imura Kumi)
- Kichi Setoyama: Kentarou Miyagi (宮城健太郎, Miyagi Kentaro)
- Kaori Nose: Hiroko Sato (佐藤寛子, Sato Hiroko)
- Sen Komachi: Fumie Hosokawa (細川ふみえ, Hosokawa Fumie)
- Gren Ghost: Keiji Hirai (Voice)
- Dr. Worm: Takao Handa (飯田孝男, Handa Takao)
- Jackomoon: Mitsutoshi Kiko (Voice)
- Lady Gold: Rio Taura (田浦リオ, Taura Rio)
- Rock Crimson: Yukitoshi Hori (堀 之紀, Hori Yukitoshi) (Voice)
- Baron Bloody Hirofumi Tanaka (Voice)
- Ichiko Nakazaki: Eri Otoguro (乙黒えり, Otoguro Eri)
- Ritsuko Takakura: Hitomi Nakahodo (仲程仁美, Nakahodo Hitomi)
- Umi Saionji: Ayano Okubo (大久保綾乃, Okubo Ayano)

=== Guest appearances ===
- Salina (サリナ): Yukina Kashiwa (柏幸奈) (ep. 20)
- Angela: Natsumi Okumura (奥村夏未) (ep. 23–24)

== Songs ==
Opening themes

- "Madan Senki Ryukendo" (魔弾戦記リュウケンドー, Madan Senki Ryukendō)
  - Lyrics & Composition: Takeshi Isozaki (磯崎 健史, Isozaki Takeshi)
  - Arrangement: Masaki Iehara (家原 正樹, Iehara Masaki)
  - Artist: Hiroshi Kitadani
  - Episodes: 1-29
- "GO! Ryukendo" (ＧＯ！リュウケンドー, GŌ! Ryukendō)
  - Lyrics & Composition: Takeshi Isozaki
  - Arrangement: Yasuhiro Takano (高野 康弘, Takano Yasuhiro)
  - Artist: Kenji Ohtsuki
  - Episodes: 30-52

Ending themes

- "EVERYBODY GOES"
  - Composition: Masato Arihara (有原 雅人, Arihara Masato)
  - Arrangement: Hajime Okano (岡野 ハジメ, Okano Hajime) & D.I.E.
  - Lyrics & Artist: Nanase Aikawa
  - Episodes: 1-13
- "Beautiful" (ビューティフル, Byūtifuru)
  - Lyrics & Composition: Mariko Shibano (柴野 真理子, Shibano Mariko)
  - Arrangement: Unknown
  - Artist: Mariko Shibano (しばのまり子, Shibano Mariko)
  - Episodes: 14-28
- "Prism of Eyes"
  - Lyrics: Tatsuki Ueda (上田 起士, Ueda Tatsuki)
  - Composition: Takamitsu Shimazaki (島崎 貴光, Shimazaki Takamitsu)
  - Arrangement: Ryosuke Nakanishi (中西 亮輔, Nakanishi Ryōsuke)
  - Artist: MAX
  - Episodes: 30-39
- "Zutto Zutto Zutto" (ずっとずっとずっと; "Much Much Much More")
  - Lyrics & Composition: Mariko Shibano
  - Arrangement: Unknown
  - Artist: Mariko Shibano
  - Episodes: (40-51)
- Title song
  - Lyrics & Composition: Takeshi Isozaki (磯崎 健史, Isozaki Takeshi)
  - Arrangement: Masaki Iehara (家原 正樹, Iehara Masaki)
  - Artist: Hiroshi Kitadani
  - Episodes: 29, 52

== International broadcasts ==
Ryukendo airs in the Philippines on Hero TV during Super Patrol Force dubbed in Tagalog and on Cartoon Network Philippines during Toonami dubbed in English. It also airs in Indonesia on Indosiar. It also airs in Hong Kong on ATV. It aired dubbed in Spanish on WKAQ-TV, a Telemundo affiliate on San Juan, Puerto Rico. In Brazil, the series was dubbed in Portuguese and was aired on RedeTV!'s TV Kids time-block from late 2009 through 2010. And Singapore, Mediacorp. It has also been dubbed in Hindi, Tamil, Telugu, Bengali, and Marathi, and was aired in India from 2011 to 2012 on Disney XD India, and is just called Ryukendo there. Episode 32 was skipped in India possibly because the demon Jemind resembled Hindu God Ganesha and Disney India wanted to avoid hurting religious sentiments. Scenes involving Jamind's shadow form were also removed in the final episode of Indian Dubs because for the same reason.

It was also the last broadcast program to air on the Mexican channel ZAZ TV before ceasing broadcast on July 31, 2012.
