= Kei Shimizu =

Japanese comedian

- 清水 圭
- Born: Keita Shimizu; June 24, 1961 (age 64); Uji, Kyoto, Japan
- Occupation: Comedian
- Years active: 1984 - 2022
- Agent: Yoshimoto Kogyo (1986 - 2022)
- Spouse: Miyuki Kosaka (m. 1994; div. 2023)

Keita Shimizu (清水 圭太, Shimizu Keita; born June 24, 1961, in Uji, Kyoto, Japan), simply known as Kei Shimizu (清水 圭, Shimizu Kei), is a retired Japanese comedian who was represented by the talent agency, Yoshimoto Kogyo.

In May 2022, Shimizu announced on his blog that he was retiring from show business, citing "lack of motivation" and a desire to live a normal life away from show business. His profile was removed from the Yoshimoto Kogyo website later that month and he closed his personal blog soon after.

On May 27, 2023, it was announced that he had divorced his wife, actress and former idol Miyuki Kosaka, after 29 years of marriage. Shimizu and Kosaka had two sons together. While Kosaka and their sons remained in the Tokyo area, Shimizu has returned to his family's home in Kyoto, away from the public eye.

== Filmography ==
=== Variety ===
Year	Title	Network	Notes
1991	Gōkon! Gasshuku! Kaihō-ku!	ABC	
	Ai no Tabiji	CBC	
	Knight Scoop	ABC	
	Shūkan Stamina Tengoku	Fuji TV	
	Asakusabashi Young Yōhin-ten	TV Tokyo	
	Sekai Tondemo!? History	TV Asahi	
	Challenge Sai Maō	TBS	
1993	Waratte Iitomo!	Fuji TV	
1993	Waratte Iitomo Special Issue	Fuji TV	
1993	Waratte Iitomo Tokudai-gō	Fuji TV	
	Otona ni Naritai	Nagoya TV	
1995	Sekai Ururun Taizai-ki	MBS, TBS	Regular respondent
	Tamori Club	TV Asahi	Occasional guest appearances
	Tamori no Bokyabura Tengoku		
	Hei!Say!A Board of Education	Fuji TV	
	Takeshi no Daredemo Picasso	TV Tokyo	
1998	Anata ni Arigatō	Kansai	
1998	Unbelievable	Fuji TV	
	Number 12 Nekketsu Sakkā Sengen	TV Tokyo	
	Susume! Cliffhanger Bōken-tai	CBC	
	Akashiya Mansion Monogatari	Fuji TV	
	Nanmon Kaiketsu! Go Kinjo no Sokojikara	NHK	
	Shumi Yūyū	NHK Educational	
	Naruhodo! Lab	TV Osaka	
2007	Yajiuma Plus	TV Asahi	Saturday commentator
2007	Setagaya.A.F.Base	BS Fuji	
	Countdown Football	Fuji TV One	

=== Drama ===
Year	Title	Role	Network	Notes
1987	Kaō Meijin Gekijō	Manager Ken	Kansai	
1993	Ore-tachi no Ole!		MBS	
1993	Fu-zoroi no Eleven	Director Yagami	Kansai	
1995	Akarui Kazoku Keikaku	Takao Umemoto	Fuji TV	
1996	Hitorikurashi	Keita Kuwabara	TBS	
2001	Ashita Ga Arusa	Hamada	NTV	Episode 1
2001	Tax Inspector Madogiwa Taro		TBS	
2001	Otose	Isanji	NHK	
2002	Koi Nochikara		Fuji TV	Episode 6
2002	Shin Zukkoke San Ningumi		NHK	
2006	Madan Senki Ryukendo	Yuuya Amachi	TV Aichi	
2008	Mitsuhiko Asami Series		TBS	
2012	Yoru Dora	Chef	NHK General	

=== Films ===
Year	Title	Role	Notes
1991	Kaze, Slow Down		
2003	Ultraman Cosmos vs. Ultraman Justice: The Final Battle	Vice Captain Kashima	
2007	Secondhand		
2008	Juken no Cinderella		
