= Emiko Nakagawa =

Japanese chess player

Personal information
- Born: 5 August 1941 (age 84)

Chess career
- Country: Japan
- Title: Woman Candidate Master (2006)
- Peak rating: 2050 (January 2001)

Emiko Nakagawa (中川 笑子, Nakagawa Emiko; born 5 August 1941) is a Japanese chess player, six-times Japanese Women's Chess Championship winner (1975, 1976, 2003, 2006, 2007, 2008).

== Biography ==
From the 1970s to the 2000s Emiko Nakagawa was one of the leading female chess players in Japan. She six times won Japanese Women's Chess Championships: 1975, 1976, 2003, 2006, 2007, and 2008.

In 1975 in Melbourne Emiko Nakagawa participated in Women's World Chess Championships Asian Pacific Zonal tournament and ranked in 4th place. In 1987 in Jakarta she participated in Women's World Chess Championships South-East Asian Zonal tournament and ranked in 8th place. Emiko Nakagawa played for Japan in Asian Games (2006) and Asian Indoor Games (2009).

Emiko Nakagawa played for Japan in the Women's Chess Olympiads:

- In 1976, at first board in the 7th Chess Olympiad (women) in Haifa (+2, =1, -5),
- In 1978, at third board in the 8th Chess Olympiad (women) in Buenos Aires (+0, =6, -7),
- In 1980, at third board in the 9th Chess Olympiad (women) in Valletta (+5, =6, -3),
- In 1982, at third board in the 10th Chess Olympiad (women) in Lucerne (+5, =4, -3),
- In 1984, at third board in the 26th Chess Olympiad (women) in Thessaloniki (+4, =8, -2),
- In 1986, at third board in the 27th Chess Olympiad (women) in Dubai (+4, =6, -2),
- In 2000, at third board in the 34th Chess Olympiad (women) in Istanbul (+3, =6, -3),
- In 2002, at second board in the 35th Chess Olympiad (women) in Bled (+3, =5, -6),
- In 2004, at first board in the 36th Chess Olympiad (women) in Calvià (+2, =7, -4),
- In 2006, at first board in the 37th Chess Olympiad (women) in Turin (+3, =4, -4),
- In 2008, at first board in the 38th Chess Olympiad (women) in Dresden (+5, =1, -5),
- In 2010, at first board in the 39th Chess Olympiad (women) in Khanty-Mansiysk (+4, =2, -5),
- In 2012, at second board in the 40th Chess Olympiad (women) in Istanbul (+3, =0, -6).
