= Yuma Ishigaki =

Japanese actor (born 1982)

- 石垣 佑磨
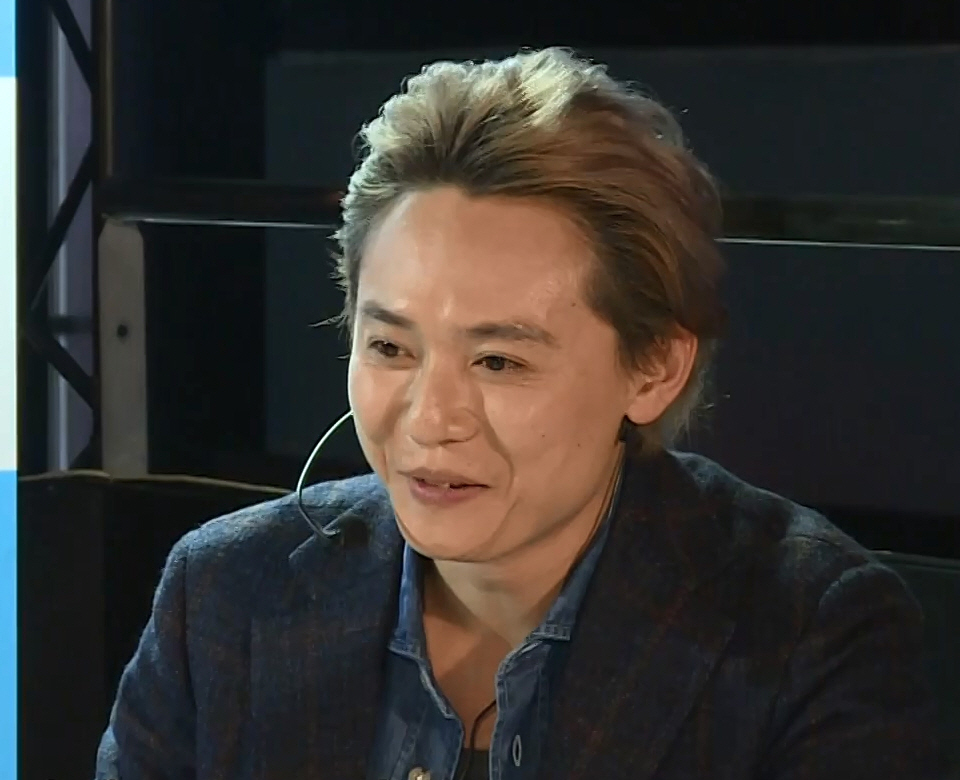
- Born: August 28, 1982 (age 43); Gifu Prefecture, Japan
- Occupations: Actor; tarento
- Years active: 2000–present
- Spouse: Manami Mori (m. 2022)

Yuma Ishigaki (石垣 佑磨, Ishigaki Yūma; born August 28, 1982) is a Japanese actor from Gifu Prefecture and raised in Nerima, Tokyo.

== Personal life ==
Ishigaki married freelance announcer Manami Mori, who is fourteen years younger than him, on his 40th birthday, August 28, 2022.

== Filmography ==
=== Movies ===
- Lovers' Kiss (2003)
- Azumi (2003)
- Battle Royale 2 (2003)
- Azumi 2: Death or Love (2005)
- Thirteen Assassins (2010)
- Red Tears (2011)
- Nintama Rantarō (2011)
- Hard Romantic-er (2011)
- Hakuji no Hito (2012)
- Space Sheriff Gavan: The Movie (2012)
- Kamen Rider × Super Sentai × Space Sheriff: Super Hero Taisen Z (2013)
- Sanada 10 Braves (2016)
- Space Squad (2017)
- Cherry Boys (2018)
- Nobutora (2021), Takeda Nobunao
- Tora no Ryūgi (2022)
- Okaeri no Yu (2026)

=== TV drama ===
- Densetsu no Kyoshi (NTV, 2000)
- R-17 (TV Asahi, 2001)
- Gokusen (NTV, 2002)
- Yankee Bokou ni Kaeru (TBS, 2003)
- Water Boys (TBS, 2003)
- Yonimo Kimyona Monogatari Aketekure (Fuji TV, 2004)
- Ace wo Nerae Kiseki e no Chousen (TV Asahi, 2004)
- Ace wo Nerae! (TV Asahi, 2004)
- Ranpo R Kuro Tokage (NTV, 2004)
- Holyland (TV Tokyo, 2005)
- Division 1 Yuku na! Ryoma (Fuji TV, 2005)
- Ganbatte Ikimasshoi (KTV, 2005, ep1)
- Engine (Fuji TV, 2005)
- H2 (TBS, 2005)
- Renai Shousetsu (TBS, 2006)
- Shimokita Sundays (TV Asahi, 2006)
- Yaoh (TBS, 2006)
- Tenka Souran (TV Tokyo, 2006)
- Asakusa Fukumaru Ryokan 2 (TBS, 2007)
- Hanazakari no Kimitachi e (Fuji TV, 2007)
- Natsu Kumo Agare (NHK, 2007)
- Asakusa Fukumaru Ryokan (TBS, 2007)
- Hanazakari no Kimitachi e SP as Tennoji Megumi (Fuji TV, 2008)
- Yagyu Ichizoku no Inbo (TV Asahi, 2008)
- Lotto 6 de San-oku Ni-senman En Ateta Otoko as Satake Shuichi (TV Asahi, 2008)
- BOSS as Ikegami Kengo (Fuji TV, 2009, ep10-11)
- LOVE GAME as Hidekatsu (NTV, 2009, ep8)
- Mieru Onna Tsukiko (NTV, 2011)
- Tokumei Sentai Go-Busters (2012) Geki Jumonji/Gavan Type G (Episodes 31 & 32)
- Uchu Sentai Kyuranger (2017) Geki Jumonji/Gavan Type G (Episode 18)

=== Anime ===
- Black Jack: The Two Doctors of Darkness (2005)
