= Shogo Yamaguchi =

Japanese actor

- Born: 19 February 1983 (age 43); Nagoya, Aichi Prefecture, Japan
- Occupation: Actor
- Years active: 2000-present
- Known for: Madan Senki Ryukendo, Azumi film series, Hancho, Parazoku

Shogo Yamaguchi (山口 翔悟, Yamaguchi Shōgo; born February 19, 1983) in Aichi Prefecture is a Japanese actor. He debuted as an actor in V-cinema in 2001, and made his theatrical film debut in 2003 in Azumi. His first main lead starring role was in the tokusatsu television series Madan Senki Ryukendo in 2006, which was a major breakthrough and made him rise to worldwide fame, and is also considered to be his best and most memorable performance to date. In 2008, he was selected from an audition of 500 actors to play the male lead against the heroine in the NHK Asadora Dandan. His other notable roles are in the movie Parazoku: Parapara ja Naika (2006) and the television series Hanchō.

== Personal life ==
Yamaguchi lives with his two beloved cats, Ichimaru and Bo. He is an ardent supporter of the football club Arsenal F.C. He is also actively involved with several theatre and stage plays.

Yamaguchi also continues to maintain a friendship with Gen & Kouhei Kuroda, who were his co-stars from Madan Senki Ryukendo and played Fudou and Koichi in the show respectively. The three are known to get together every now and then.

Yamaguchi is a painter and craftsman by hobby, often sharing his creations through social media accounts.

== Filmography ==
=== Television ===
==== TV serials ====
- AIBOU: Tokyo Detective Duo (2000–2019), Character name unknown
- Madan Senki Ryukendo (2006), Narukami Kenji aka Ryukendo
- Kobayakawa Nobuki no koi (2006), Jun Kanai
- Kekkon shiki he ikô! (2006–2007), Character name unknown
- Mop Girl(2007), Ozaki Hikaru
- Asadora:Dandan (2008–2009), Male lead; name unknown
- Hanchô: Jinnansho Azumihan (2009–2011), Taichirou Sakurai
- Honjitsu wa Taian Nari (2012), Yuki Yamada
- Naru yô ni Naru sa (2013–2014), Character name unknown
- Tachibana Noboru Seishun Tebikae (2016–2017), Seikichi
- CRISIS: Special Security Squad (2017), Character name unknown
- Massage Tantei Joe (2017), Harima
- Okusama Wa Toriatsukai Chûi (2017), Character name unknown
- Kaijû Club: Kûsô Tokusatsu Seishun Ki (2017), Nishi
- Joshiteki Seikatsu (2018), Takada Kenichi
- Segodon (2018), Nakaoka Shintarō
- The Story of Shotaro Ishinomori, The Man Who Created a Hero (TV semi-autobiographical one-off drama) (2018), Kushihara;Publishing company

==== TV films ====
- Bizarre Tales 2008 Spring Special (2008), Horibe in flashback
- Ashita mo mata ikite ikô (2010), Yusuke Yoshizaki
- Senjô Parser Himuro Natsuko: Gôka ferry satsujin jiken (2012), Jun Akita

=== Films ===
- Godzilla, Mothra and King Ghidorah: Giant Monsters All-Out Attack (2001), Character name unknown
- Azumi (2003), Komoru
- School Wars: Hero (2004), Rogue student
- Azumi 2: Death or Love (2005), Reprises role as Komoru; Archive footage
- Gakko no Toshi Densetsu Toire no Hanako-san (2006), Character name unknown
- Parazoku: Parapara ja Naika (2006), Fujita
- Rescue the Mach Train! (2008), Reprises role as Narukami Kenji from Madan Senki Ryukendo
