= Red Tears =

- Directed by: Takanori Tsujimoto
- Written by: Takanori Tsujimoto; Yonekawa Eiichi
- Produced by: Yasuaki Kurata; Masashi Horiuchi
- Starring: Natsuki Kato; Yuma Ishigaki; Yasuaki Kurata
- Cinematography: Takanori Tsujimoto; Hiroaki Yuasa
- Music by: Hikaru Yoshida
- Production company: Kurata Promotion
- Release dates: October 24, 2011 (Tokyo); April 7, 2012 (Japan)
- Running time: 87 minutes
- Country: Japan

Red Tears (紅涙) is a 2011 Japanese splatter film directed and co-written by Takanori Tsujimoto. The film stars Natsuki Kato, Yuma Ishigaki and Yasuaki Kurata. It involves two detectives who hunt down a serial killer. The film was shown at the Tokyo International Film Festival in 2011.

== Production ==
Producer and star of the film Yasuaki Kurata wanted to make a film with a female protagonist which led to an idea about making a vampire film. Kurata hired director Takanori Tsujimoto as it was his first horror film he worked on and Tsujimoto was known for his horror films. Kurata gave Tsujimoto the elements he wanted in the film (vampires, female protagonists and opportunities for extended action fight scenes) and had him build a story around them. Screenwriter Eiichi Yonekawa wrote a script involving two police detectives in Tokywo who are trying to catch the serial killer. Using it as a framework, Tsujimoto added large elements that would involve fake blood.

The action scenes in the film were inspired by Hong Kong action cinema. Kurata compared the Hong Kong style to the Japanese style by saying that “Hong Kong films are about over-action, or overdoing it; whereas Japanese action is often too subtle. It doesn’t satisfy the audience in the same way. I prefer Hong Kong style myself, but keep in mind that wire work was not used in Hong Kong until ‘Chinese Ghost Story’ (1987). My production company introduced wire action to Japanese films, about nine years ago, in a film called ‘Yellow Dragon’.”

== Cast ==
- Natsuki Kato as Sayoko Mitarai
- Yuma Ishigaki as Tetsuo Nojima
- Yasuaki Kurata as Genjiro Mishima
- Yamaguchi Karin as Masayo Mitarai, Sayoko's mother
- Ayaka Morita as Mika Hazuki
- Koji Nakamura as Ranma Yasuda
- Masahiro Nagai as Akihisa Ozu
- Yoju Takashima as Tatsuya Yamamura

== Release ==
The film's Japanese title translates as Red Tears. Producer Yasuaki Kurata stated that for overseas distribution that the English title will be Sword of Blood. The film was also released under the title Monster Killer. Red Tears premiered at the Tokyo International Film Festival on October 24, 2011.
