= Japanese Chess Championship =

The Japanese women's chess championship has been largely dominated by Naoko Takemoto (Naoko Takahashi before she married).

== Winners ==
No.	Held in	Men's Winner	Women's Winner
1	1968	Yukio Miyasaka	
2	1969	Yukio Miyasaka	
3	1970	Yukio Miyasaka	
4	1971	Yukio Miyasaka	
5	1972	Gentaro Gonda	
6	1973	Gentaro Gonda	
7	1974	Ken Hamada	Miyoko Watai
8	1975	Gentaro Gonda	Emiko Nakagawa
9	1976	Gentaro Gonda	Emiko Nakagawa
10	1977	Gentaro Gonda	Miyoko Watai
11	1978	Gentaro Gonda	Miyoko Watai
12	1979	Gentaro Gonda	Naoko Takemoto
13	1980	Koobun Oda	Naoko Takemoto
14	1981	Koobun Oda	Naoko Takemoto
15	1982	Hiroyuki Nishimura	Naoko Takemoto
16	1983	Hiroyuki Nishimura	Naoko Takemoto
17	1984	Hiroyuki Nishimura	Naoko Takemoto
18	1985	Gentaro Gonda; Paul Kuroda	Naoko Takemoto
19	1986	Jacques Pineau	Naoko Takemoto
20	1987	Tomomichi Suzuki	Naoko Takemoto
21	1988	Loren Schmidt	Naoko Takemoto
22	1989	Gentaro Gonda	Naoko Takemoto
23	1990	Joselito Sunga	Naoko Takemoto
24	1991	Mats Andersson	Naoko Takemoto
25	1992	Domingo Ramos	Naoko Takemoto
26	1993	Jacques Pineau	Naoko Takemoto
27	1994	Hiroyuki Nishimura	Naoko Takemoto
28	1995	Domingo Ramos; Tomohiko Matsuo	not played
29	1996	Gentaro Gonda	not played
30	1997	Gentaro Gonda	not played
31	1998	Akira Watanabe	not played
32	1999	Akira Watanabe	not played
33	2000	Akira Watanabe	not played
34	2001	Gentaro Gonda	Miyoko Watai; Nguyen Khanh Ngoc
35	2002	Simon Bibby	not played
36	2003	Ryo Shiomi; Kiyotaka Sakai	Emiko Nakagawa
37	2004	Kiyotaka Sakai	Melody Takayasu
38	2005	Shinya Kojima	Haruko Tanaka
39	2006	Shinya Kojima; Masahiro Baba	Emiko Nakagawa
40	2007	Shinsaku Uesugi; Shinya Kojima	Emiko Nakagawa
41	2008	Shinya Kojima	Emiko Nakagawa
42	2009	Sam Collins	Narumi Uchida
43	2010	Ryosuke Nanjo; Shinya Kojima	Narumi Uchida
44	2011	Ryuji Nakamura; Masahiro Baba	Ekaterina Egorova
45	2012	Ryosuke Nanjo	Epiphany Peters
46	2013	Junta Ikeda	Narumi Uchida
47	2014	Ryosuke Nanjo	Narumi Uchida
48	2015	Masahiro Baba	Mirai Ishizuka
49	2016	Trần Thanh Tú	Mirai Ishizuka
50	2017	Koji Noguchi	Karen Hoshino
51	2018	Trần Thanh Tú	Qin Ranran
52	2019	Mirai Aoshima	
53	2020	Trần Thanh Tú	not played
54	2021	not played	not played
55	2022	Mirai Aoshima	Azumi Sakai
56	2023	Ryosuke Nanjo	Azumi Sakai
57	2024	Ryosuke Nanjo	Rikka Mitsuyama
58	2025	Trần Thanh Tú	Elizabeth Ivanov
