= Azumi (film) =

- Japanese theatrical poster
- Directed by: Ryuhei Kitamura
- Written by: Mataichiro Yamamoto; Isao Kiriyama
- Based on: Azumi by Yū Koyama
- Produced by: Toshiaki Nakazawa; Mataichiro Yamamoto; Sumio Kiga; Morihiro Kodama
- Starring: Aya Ueto; Yuma Ishigaki; Shun Oguri; Hiroki Narimiya; Takatoshi Kaneko; Eita; Shogo Yamaguchi; Joe Odagiri
- Cinematography: Takumi Furuya
- Edited by: Shûichi Kakesu
- Music by: Taro Iwashiro
- Production company: Toho
- Distributed by: Toho (Japan); Urban Vision (United States)
- Release date: May 10, 2003 (Japan)
- Running time: 142 minutes
- Country: Japan
- Language: Japanese
- Box office: $6,710,522

Azumi (Japanese: あずみ) is a 2003 Japanese jidaigeki film directed by Ryûhei Kitamura and starring Aya Ueto, Yuma Ishigaki, Shun Oguri, Hiroki Narimiya, Takatoshi Kaneko, Eita, Shogo Yamaguchi and Joe Odagiri. Azumi is a live-action adaptation of Yū Koyama's manga series of the same title, and was followed by the sequel Azumi 2: Death or Love in 2005.

== Plot ==
In feudal Japan, old master Jiji and a survivor of the Tokugawa shogunate converse after surviving a brutal battle, with Jiji asked by the Tokugawa Shogunate to raise a band of assassins. Their task is to finish off Toyotomi Hideyoshi's three allies: Nagamasa Asano, Kiyomasa Kato and Masayuki Sanada, to prevent an outbreak of a new civil war.

Azumi is discovered as a little girl kneeling without visible emotion next to the body of her dead mother by Gessai and his entourage of young students. She is then raised by him in the martial skills of sword fighting and the art of assassination in a secret mountain area with no interactions with the outside world. Many years past, Azumi and her classmates, now at young adult age, are constantly being told about a "mission" they must accomplish, though they have no idea what this mission is yet. Prior to setting out on their mission, their master orders his students to "pair up" with each other's best friend, with the closest friends picking each other. Their master then orders them to kill each other, with only the ones who are capable of killing be his assassins. Therefore, out of the ten students only five will be qualify to proceed with the mission: Azumi pairs with and is forced to kill Nachi, her closest friend. The group then buries the dead and burn any trace of their existence there, including their house. A member of the group questions why they killed their friends, but their master refuses to speak. Arriving at a village, the group is ordered by their master to hide and not intervene as bandits attack and destroy the village. Afterwards, some members aggressively demand why they were not allowed to save the village as they could have easily killed all the bandits. Their master berates them that killing a few bandits won't change Japan, and he finally tells them of their mission, to assassinate the warlords who allow this to happen to Japan, and to do it secretly.

The first leg in their mission, assassinating Nagamasa Asano, goes well as Nagamasa Asano was easily caught off guard by Azumi's innocence. Although Azumi kills Magamasa Asano, she is taken back by his dying words, questioning why a young beautiful girl is a cold-hearted killer. Upon hearing about Asano's death, Kato tasks his general Kanbei Inoue with his safety. Kanbei assesses the threat with a convoy containing extra security, but Azumi and her group are easily able to kill the convoy and kill Kato. In the process Kanbei Inoue learns that the group has a female assassin. As the group arrives at a different village, the young assassins are given leave to see a small traveling circus troupe, where Hyuga falls in love with Yae, one of the troupe's actresses, and Azumi is impressed and amazed at seeing and interacting with outside people for the first time, as well as talking to other girls. At the same time, it is revealed that the Kato that was just assassinated by Azumi's group was nothing more than a double. After his assessment, Kanbei enlists help from three rogueish brothers who, eventually confuse Yae's circus troupe for the assassins as they were told that the group had one girl with them, slaughtering them all until Hyuga, Azumi, and Nagara arrive. By the time the three dispatch the rogues, only Yae is left alive. Kanbei then sends his monkey-like henchman Saru to make a deal with the insidious and narcissistic mercenary named Bijomaru Mogami, previously imprisoned and under constant guard. Kanbei promises Bijomaro that should he successfully kill the assassins, his past crimes will be forgotten. Bijomaru agrees and quickly gets to work hunting down the five assassins, with Saru as his guide. Bijomaru's bloodlust, much to the chagrin of Saru, is such that he often kills allies in battle along with his enemy.

As the group returns to the village with the survivor Yae, they find one of their comrades extremely sick, due to accidentally getting hit with a poison dart from their assassination of Kato. Their masters angrily berates the group for killing people who weren't their targets, even if they were saving someone else. The group breaks off, and the master takes two assassins with him while Azumi and the rest are expelled from the mission. As the master leaves, their sick comrade commits suicide to prevent him for being a burden to them. Azumi and Hyuga bury their dead comrade, and Hyuga decides to go with Yae. Sometimes later he is confronted by Saru and Bijomaru, and a battle between the assassin and the mercenary ensues. During the battle, Bijomaru uses psychological warfare in addition to swordplay as he explains to a frightened Hyuga that his sword does not contain a hand-guard since he has never had to defend another's blow. As Hyuga lays bleeding and defeated, Bijomaru forces Yae to watch him toy with the dying boy. Saru, uncomfortable and sicken with this lack of respect for another warrior, finishes Hyuga off as an act of mercy, and confronts Bijomaru as well as prevent him from killing Yae. They leave and Yae buries Hyuga. Azumi senses something and soon finds Yae by Hyuga's body. After burying another of her friends, Azumi is convince by Yae to abandon her violent lifestyle to become a woman. Together they begin a journey over the mountains and out of the valley to go and live in peace with Yae's kin in Tangou. Yae socializes Azumi during the journey, dressing her in a kimono and adorning her with make-up, perfume and hair treatment, the first time Azumi has every wore traditional female clothes. Just as they begin to get comfortable during their journey, a band of brigands finds them as they sleep, and attempts to gang rape the young women. Azumi, who has not slept beside her sword as her training normally dictated, is caught off guard, and initially hesitates to do anything but then right before they can rape Yae, Azumi steals the sword of a would-be captor, castrating him before killing all of the brigands and saving Yae. Azumi apologizes to Yae but tells her that sometimes violence is the only way. The experience leaves Azumi to now fully understand that she must obey her training, and complete her mission of assassinating the other two warlords. The next morning she sets off to find her master and comrades, but not before walking Yae to a safe road, telling Yae that she will meet her later, in Tangou.

Meanwhile, the master, Nagara and Ukiha, after finding out that Kato is still alive, attempts to kill him at a sea port village. The plan is foiled when it is revealed that Kato was expecting them and has sprung a trap, reinforcing his samurai with common mercenaries and bandits. The master is captured and placed on a cross in anticipation of Azumi's arrival, and Ukiha dies attempting to kill Bijomaru. She arrives at Kato's compound not long after and starts her attack by turning some cannon on the area. She then proceeds through the compound, wreaking havoc enough to attract and impress Bijomaru, who cannot control his own bloodlust and decides to warm up by attacking the common mercenaries while Kanbei and Kato escape to sea. Nagara is shown to have survived the night by hiding and gives Azumi more dynamite he stole from the base, then Nagara rushing into the building where Saru is at and blows it up, destroying everything. The mercenaries then attack Saru's men after the samurai goes all out and starts shooting aimlessly, killing some of the mercenaries. All hell breaks lose and an all out battles occurs. Soon after, all the samurai and mercenaries are killed and a final battle takes place between Azumi and Bijomaru. In the battle he is forced to defend for the first time and consistently praises Azumi's skills. Azumi eventually kills Bijomaru's by beheading him. Azumi then releases her dying master from the cross and he uses his last breath to tell her to abandon their mission and go live her life, away from violence and war.

Later, Kanbei and Kato are on their boat, congratulating each other about overcoming the assassin threat and plotting their next move against Tokugawa Ieyasu. Azumi appears as if from nowhere, and finishes the warlord in one blow. Before escaping, she turns around to make eye contact with Kanbei, who then becomes frantic at failing to protect Kato. She is then seen diving into the sea and is seen later relaxing as she floats. Azumi then returns to the scene of her battle with Bijomaru to find Nagara alive, making his way out from the rubble he was buried under during the battle. The two mourn their master and comrades before Azumi takes the initiative and tells Nagara they have one more person to kill, Sanada. They leave to complete their mission.

== Cast ==
- Aya Ueto as Azumi
- Yuma Ishigaki as Nagara
- Shun Oguri as Nachi
- Hiroki Narimiya as Ukiha
- Takatoshi Kaneko as Amagi
- Eita as Hiei
- Shogo Yamaguchi as Komoro
- Yasuomi Sano as Yura
- Shinji Suzuki as Awa
- Kenji Kohashi as Hyuga
- Aya Okamoto as Yae
- Joe Odagiri as Bijomaru Mogami
- Kazuki Kitamura as Kanbei Inoue
- Yoshio Harada as Gessai
- Minoru Matsumoto as Saru
- Naoto Takenaka as Kiyomasa Kato
- Masatō Ibu as Nagamasa Asano
- Ryō as Mother being attacked
- Kei Satō as Tenkai Nankōbō

Hideo Kojima appears as one of the mercenaries towards the end, although he doesn't have any spoken dialogue.

== Release ==
Azumi opened nationwide in Japan on May 10, 2003, opening at No. 4 grossing $1,304,864 playing at 253 screens. In total the film grossed $6,668,719 in Japan. In the United States, the film opened in limited release grossing $2,848 in one theater, It was distributed by its writer and co-producer's Mataichiro Yamamoto's company, Urban Vision, on their label AsiaVision, with a DVD home release 1, 2006. In total the film grossed $41,803 in North America. It gained its first international exposure when it was aired on the WOWOW satellite television network.

== Reception ==
The film received mixed reviews from critics. The review aggregator Rotten Tomatoes reported that 47% of critics gave Azumi positive reviews based on 32 reviews, with an average rating of 5.20 out of 10. The site's critics consensus reads, "This adaptation of the popular manga series offers exquisitely choreographed violence – and little else." Metacritic reported the film had an average score of 49 out of 100 based on 14 reviews, indicating "mixed or average reviews".

Awards:

- 2003 Japanese Academy Awards
  - Newcomer of the Year (won): Aya Ueto and Jô Odagiri
  - Popularity Award (won): Aya Ueto (Most Popular Performer)
  - Award of the Japanese Academy (nominated): Aya Ueto (Best Actress)
- 2004 Independent Film Festival of Boston
  - Special Jury Prize (won, tie): Ryûhei Kitamura (Narrative)
- 2004 Philadelphia Film Festival
  - Audience Award (won): Ryûhei Kitamura (Best Danger After Dark Film)

== Sequel ==
In the sequel, directed by Shusuke Kaneko and set immediately after the final events of the first film, Azumi and her remaining partner Nagara are stalked by the men of a warlord she recently assassinated. Upon escaping, they are forced to join forces with a local resistance and a group of bandits in order to kill the last remaining warlord and bring lasting peace to Japan. To make things even more complicated for Azumi, she must also confront her emotions in regards to a fighter who bears an uncanny resemblance to Nachi.
