= Akira Watanabe (chess player) =

Japanese political scientist and chess player (born 1972)

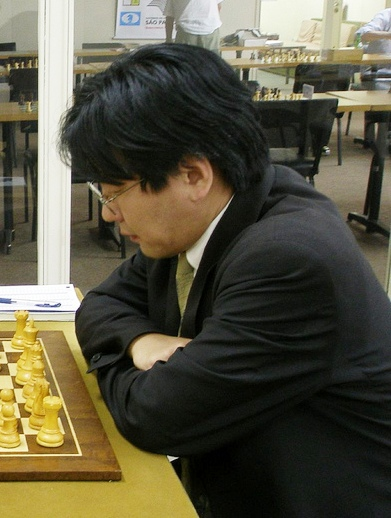
- Watanabe in 2008

Personal information
- Born: March 1, 1972 (age 54) Tokyo, Japan

Chess career
- Country: Japan
- Title: FIDE Master (1997)
- FIDE rating: 2284 (September 2014)
- Peak rating: 2388 (January 2000)

Akira Watanabe (渡辺 暁, Watanabe Akira; born March 1, 1972) is a Japanese political scientist, chess player with the title of FIDE Master. In 2020, he was an associate professor at Tokyo Institute of Technology. He was born in Tokyo and his research focuses on Mexican politics and Latin American culture and politics.

== Profile ==
He learned chess in elementary school becoming serious at when he was a high school student, at Azabu High School. After graduating from Tokyo University, he studied in Mexico. In 1997 he obtained the ranking of FIDE Master. He has won the Japanese Chess Championship three times, being national champion in 1998, 1999 and 2000 He has represented Japan in the Chess Olympiad on several occasions.

Watanabe is sometimes confused with Akira Watanabe the shogi player who has the same surname and the same reading of the name in English characters. Watanabe's favorite openings are the Sicilian Defense and King's Indian Defense.

In the field of Latin American research, he became an associate professor at Yamanashi University from April 2012, as well as, University of Tokyo. He is a part-time lecturer in Spanish at Keio University and Surugadai University. He transferred to Tokyo Institute of Technology from 2020 and continues to work as a part-time lecturer at other universities.

== Titles ==
- All Japan junior champion – 1990, 1991
- All Japan school champion – 1992, 1993
- Japanese Chess Championship – 1999, 2000, 2001
- Japan League champion – 1998, 1999, 2002
- Japan rapid champion – 1992

=== Publications ===
- Chess, start from here
- Akira Watanabe's Chess course learn strategy and how to think 24 Lessons
- Easy even for beginners, introduction to illustrated chess

=== Co-translation ===
- Under the volcano (with Malcolm Lowry)
