= Naoko Takemoto =

Japanese chess player

Personal information
- Born: 1955 (age 70–71)

Chess career
- Country: Japan
- Peak rating: 1942 (March 2024)

Naoko Takemoto (竹本尚子, Takemoto Naoko; born 1955) is a Japanese chess player and sixteen-time Japanese Women's Chess Championship winner (1979, 1980, 1981, 1982, 1983, 1984, 1985, 1986, 1987, 1988, 1989, 1990, 1991, 1992, 1993, 1994).

== Biography ==
From the end of 1970s to the mid-1990s Naoko Takemoto was one of the leading female chess players in Japan. She seventeen in row times won Japanese Women's Chess Championships from 1979 to 1994.

Naoko Takemoto three times participated in Women's World Chess Championships South-East Asian Zonal tournaments:

- in 1987 in Jakarta she ranked in 6th place.
- in 1993 in Jakarta she ranked in 12th place.
- in 1995 in Genting Highlands she ranked in 10th place.

Naoko Takemoto played for Japan in the Women's Chess Olympiads:

- In 1984, at first board in the 26th Chess Olympiad (women) in Thessaloniki (+3, =2, -7),
- In 1986, at first board in the 27th Chess Olympiad (women) in Dubai (+4, =4, -5).
