= Oi! Ryoma =

Japanese manga series

- First tankōbon volume cover, featuring Sakamoto Ryōma

お～い!竜馬
- Genre: Historical
- Manga
- Written by: Tetsuya Takeda
- Illustrated by: Yū Koyama
- Published by: Shogakukan
- Magazine: Shōnen Big Comic (1986–1987); Weekly Young Sunday (1987–1996)
- Original run: 1986 – 1996
- Volumes: 23
- Anime television series
- Directed by: Hiroshi Sasagawa
- Studio: Nippon Herald Films; Animation 21
- Original network: NHK
- Original run: April 7, 1992 – March 30, 1993
- Episodes: 39
- icon

Oi! Ryōma (お～い!竜馬; "Hey! Ryōma"), also known as Rainbow Samurai, is a Japanese manga series written by Tetsuya Takeda and illustrated by Yū Koyama. It is a comical and serious account mixing history and fiction of the life of the Bakumatsu period leader Sakamoto Ryōma. It was serialized in Shogakukan's shōnen manga magazine Shōnen Big Comic (1986–1987) and seinen manga magazine Weekly Young Sunday (1987–1996), with its chapters collected in 23 tankōbon volumes. It was adapted into a 39-episode anime television series by Nippon Herald Films and Animation 21 and broadcast on NHK from April 1992 to March 1993. The manga has had over 15 million copies in circulation.

== Synopsis ==
It is November 15, 1835, near Kōchi Castle. The youngest daughter of the Sakamoto family, Otome Sakamoto, is stargazing and sees a comet. That day her mother, Sachi Sakamoto, is about to give birth. The comet appears as a dragon and a horse, and Otome shouts to it: "Make the child born tonight a boy! I promise I'll make him a strong samurai!", after which the comet changes to a soft glow. Soon the first cry of the baby is heard—a strong baby boy. However, the newborn boy has long hair on his back which is seen as strange. At this the father, Yahei, is dumbfounded but Otome names the boy Ryōma, a name combining Japanese characters for dragon and horse.

Ryōma quickly grows but is a coward and a crybaby. He is mocked for his back hair and bullied every day by children in the neighborhood. He is not a good student and is thrown out of his juku. Otome and the second oldest sister Ei do not give up on Ryōma, and raise him more strictly. Even so, Ryōma's unique characteristic is his kind heart. This kind heart amazes the bullies in the neighborhood, led by a young Izo Okada. Zuizan Takechi, helped by Ryōma, is also impressed by his capacity for good. It looks as though Ryōma will enjoy a peaceful childhood, but he soon learns about the oppression of the gōshi (郷士) by the upper class jōshi (上士) samurai. His mother is chased to her death by the daimyō Yamanōchi, after which Ryōma vows to himself: "I want to become stronger!", at the age of 16.

== Media ==
=== Manga ===
Written by Tetsuya Takeda and illustrated by Yū Koyama, Oi! Ryoma was serialized in Shogakukan's shōnen manga magazine Shōnen Big Comic from 1986 to 1987, when the magazine ceased its publication and was transferred to the seinen manga magazine Weekly Young Sunday, where it ran until its conclusion in 1996. Shogakukan collected its chapters in twenty-three tankōbon volumes, released from October 5, 1987, to July 5, 1996; it was later republished in fourteen wideban volumes from January 16, 1998, to March 16, 2000; and twelve shinsoban volumes from October 30, 2009, to March 30, 2010.

=== Anime ===
The manga was adapted into a thirty-nine episode anime television series, produced by Nippon Herald Films and Animation 21 and broadcast on NHK from April 7, 1992, to March 30, 1993.

== Reception ==
The manga has had over 15 million copies in circulation.
