= Shinsaku Uesugi =

Japanese chess player (born 1991)

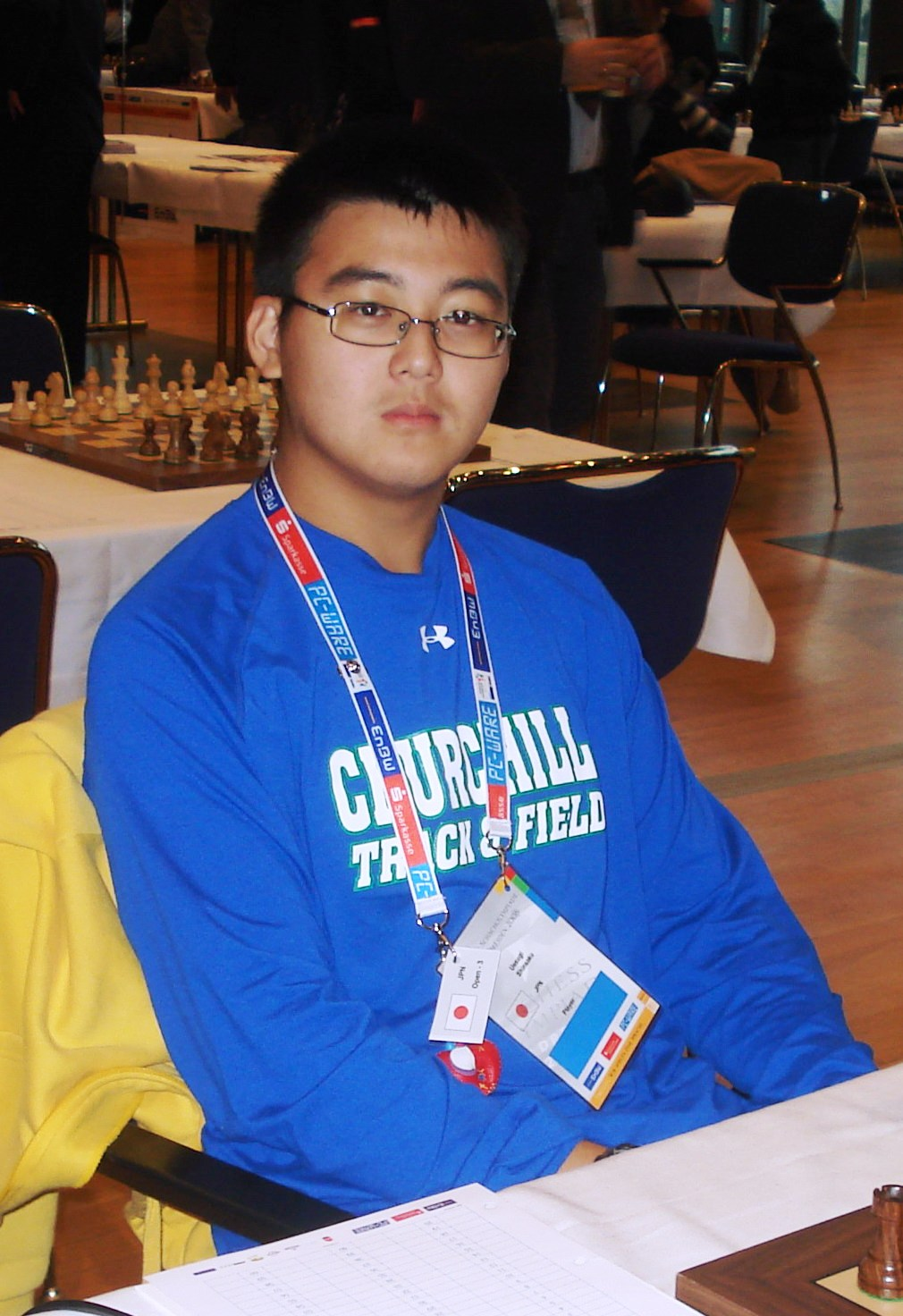
- Uesugi at the 2008 Chess Olympiad

Personal information
- Born: April 17, 1991 (age 35) Kyoto, Japan

Chess career
- Country: Japan
- Title: FIDE Master (2009)
- FIDE rating: 2300 (September 2013)
- Peak rating: 2332 (May 2010)

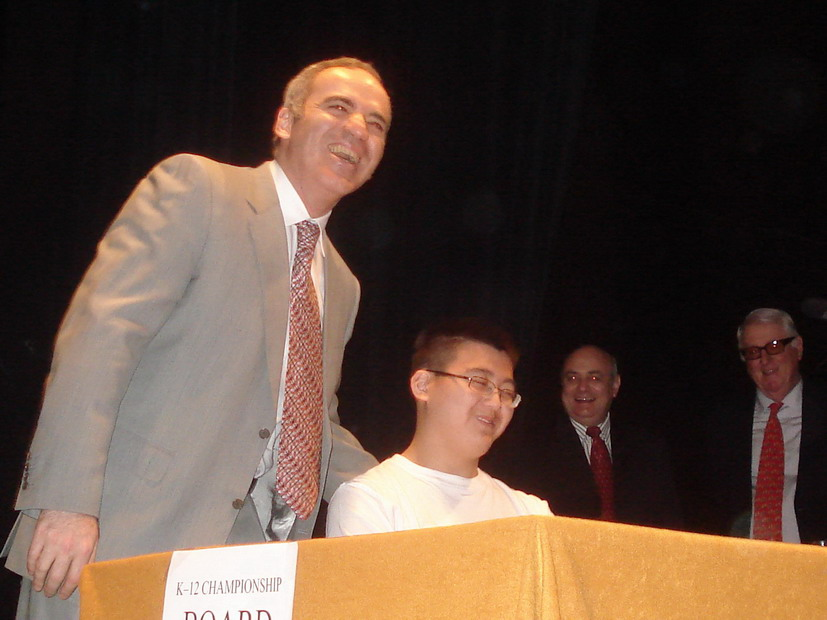
Shinsaku Uesugi with Former World Champion Garry Kasparov at the US Chess SuperNationals (the National Scholastic Championship) in Nashville, TN in April 2009. GM Kasparov made the first move of Shinsaku Uesugi for kicking off the SuperNationals.

Shinsaku Uesugi (上杉 晋作, Uesugi Shinsaku; born April 17, 1991 in Kyoto, Japan) is a Japanese chess player who holds the title of FIDE master. He won the 40th Japanese Chess Championship in May 2007 and became the youngest ever national champion (16 years, 18 days old). He also played for Japan at the 38th Chess Olympiad in November 2008 and became co-champion of the U.S. National High School Championship in April 2010.

Uesugi moved to the United States in March 2000. He graduated from Winston Churchill High School (Potomac, Maryland) in June 2010 and University of California, Berkeley in May 2014.

== Chess major achievements ==
=== World ===
- Chess Olympiad Player represented Japan for 38th Chess Olympiad, Dresden, Germany - November 2008
- World Youth Olympic, Singapore - August 2007
- World Junior Chess Championship, Istanbul, Turkey - November 2005

=== United States ===
- National High School Co-Champion, Columbus, OH - April 2010
- National High School Bughouse Chess Champion, Columbus, OH - April 2010
- Springfield Open Co-Champion, Springfield, VA - January 2010
- United States Chess League Player at Baltimore Kingfishers - AUG-NOV 2009
- UMBC Championship Co-Champion, Catonsville, MD - September 2009
- US NO.1 ranking among age 18, June 2009
- 40th Virginia Open Champion, Springfield, VA - January 2008
- National Scholastic Champion of Grade 10, Houston, TX - December 2007
- National Scholastic Champion of Grade 9, Lake Buena Vista, FL - December 2006
- Winner of Sweet 16 Invitation only Maryland Scholastic Championship to determine University of Maryland, Baltimore County (2009 US NO.1 Chess University) Chess Scholar awarded full tuition scholarship for UMBC in Grade 7, Catonsville, MD - March 2005

=== Japan ===
- Golden Open Champion, Tokyo, Japan - May 2015
- New Year Open Champion, Tokyo, Japan - January 2013
- Christmas Open Champion, Tokyo, Japan - December 2012
- Three times Japan Summer Open Champion, Tokyo, Japan - July 2008, July 2009, July 2012
- 2010-2011 Most Promising Youth Award for the coming Olympics and International Championships by Japanese Olympic Committee
- 2009-2010 Most Promising Youth Award for the coming Olympics and International Championships by Japanese Olympic Committee
- Three times Japan Junior Champion and Junior Olympic Cup winner, Tokyo, Japan - July 2007, July 2008, July 2009
- Japan Youngest ever National Champion, Tokyo, Japan - May 2007

== Other sports ==
In November 2010, Shinsaku won the UC Berkeley Canasta tournament with Ted Sanders. As of February 2011, Shinsaku Uesugi is UC Berkeley's second highest rated Canasta player.

Shinsaku also played for the UC Berkeley badminton team.
