= Miyoko Watai =

Japanese chess player (born 1945)

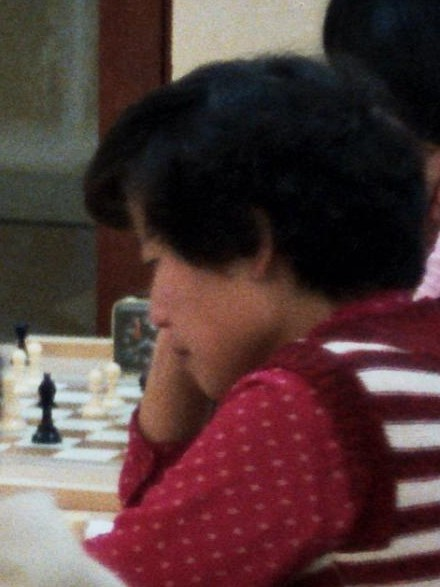
- Watai at the 1980 Chess Olympiad

Personal information
- Born: January 8, 1945 (age 81) Saitama Prefecture, Japan
- Spouse: Bobby Fischer (m. 2004; died 2008)

Chess career
- Country: Japan
- Title: Woman International Master (1997)
- FIDE rating: 2032 (January 2003) [inactive]
- Peak rating: 2050 (January 1997)

Miyoko Watai (渡井 美代子, Watai Miyoko; born January 8, 1945) is a Japanese retired chess player and widow of former world chess champion Bobby Fischer.

== Biography ==
She was awarded the title of Woman International Master by FIDE in 1997. Watai is a four-time Japanese women's champion. She lives in Kamata ward, which is part of Ōta, Tokyo.

In 1973, she met then world chess champion Bobby Fischer, and visited him several times for the next three decades. Starting in 2000 they reportedly lived together in a de facto marriage at her home. After Bobby Fischer's detention on July 13, 2004, for trying to travel with a revoked U.S. passport, she campaigned for his release.

They were reportedly married in August 2004. According to an attorney representing a competing claim to Fischer's estate, the Supreme Court of Iceland ruled in December 2009 that Watai's claim of marriage to Fischer was invalidated because of her failure to present the original of their alleged marriage certificate. However, on March 3, 2011, a district court in Iceland ruled that Watai and Fischer had legally married on September 6, 2004, and that Watai, as Fischer's widow and heir, was entitled to inherit his estate.
