= Dana Tuleyeva-Aketayeva =

Kazakhstani chess player (born 1986)

Personal information
- Born: 24 January 1986 (age 40)

Chess career
- Country: Kazakhstan
- Title: Woman International Master (2002)
- Peak rating: 2330 (January 2006)

Dana Töleeva-Äketaeva (Note: Often transliterated as Dana Tuleyeva-Aketayeva through a Russified Romanization of Дана Тулеева-Акетаева.) (née Äketaeva; (Note: Often transliterated as Aketayeva through a Russified Romanization of Акетаева.) Kazakh: Дана Төлеева-Әкетаева; born 24 January 1986) is a Kazakhstani chess player who holds the FIDE titles of Woman International Master (WIM, 2003).

== Biography ==
Three times Tuleyeva-Aketayeva represented Kazakhstan in World Girls' Junior Chess Championships (2004–2006) Seven times she has won Kazakhstan's Girls' Youth Chess Championships in different age groups. In 2005, she won Kazakhstani Women's Chess Championship and Women's World Chess Championship Asian Zonal tournament.

In 2006, she participated in Women's World Chess Championship by knock-out system and in the first round lost to Qin Kanying.

Tuleyeva-Aketayeva played for Kazakhstan in the Women's Chess Olympiads:

- In 2002, at third board in the 35th Chess Olympiad (women) in Bled (+8, =1, -5),
- In 2006, at first board in the 37th Chess Olympiad (women) in Turin (+3, =6, -4).

In 2003, she was awarded the FIDE Woman International Master (WIM) titles.
