= Mirai Aoshima =

Japanese shogi and chess player (born 1995)

- Born: February 27, 1995 (age 31); Mishima, Shizuoka

Career
- Achieved professional status: April 1, 2015 (aged 20)
- Badge number: 300
- Rank: 7-dan
- Teacher: Terutaka Yasue (8-dan)
- Meijin class: B2
- Ryūō class: 4

Websites
- JSA profile page
- Chess career
- Country: Japan
- Title: FIDE Master (2019)
- Peak rating: 2385 (August 2024)

Mirai Aoshima (青嶋 未来, Aoshima Mirai; born February 27, 1995) is a Japanese professional shogi player ranked 7-dan, and a chess player holding the title of FIDE Master.

== Early life, amateur shogi and apprentice professional ==
Mirai Aoshima was born on February 27, 1995, in Mishima, Shizuoka. He learned how to play shogi when he was about six years old from a shogi book his father bought him. As an elementary school student, he represented Tokyo in the All Japan Elementary School Student Kurashiki Ōshō Tournament in 2003 and 2005, finishing in ninth place each time.

Aoshima entered the Japan Shogi Association's apprentice school at the rank of 6-kyū under the tutelage of shogi professional Terutaka Yasue in 2005. He was promoted to the rank of 3-dan in 2012 and then obtained full professional status and the rank of 4-dan after taking first place in the 56th 3-dan League with a record of 16 wins and 2 losses.

== Shogi professional ==
=== Promotion history ===
Aoshima's promotion history is as follows:

- 6-kyū: September 2005
- 3-dan: October 2012
- 4-dan: April 1, 2015
- 5-dan: March 3, 2016
- 6-dan: June 16, 2020
- 7-dan: February 5, 2025

=== Awards and honors ===
Aoshima received the Japan Shogi Association Annual Shogi Awards for "Best Winning Percentage" and "Most Consecutive Games Won" for 2016.

== Chess ==
Aoshima is a FIDE Master with a peak FIDE rating of 2385 as of August 2024. In 2019, he won the Tokyo Chess Championship and the Japan Chess Championship.
