= Genki, The Boy Champ =

Japanese manga series

- First volume cover

がんばれ元気 (Ganbare Genki)
- Genre: Sports, comedy
- Manga
- Written by: Yū Koyama
- Published by: Shogakukan
- Magazine: Weekly Shōnen Sunday
- Original run: 1976 – 1981
- Volumes: 28
- Anime television series
- Directed by: Rintaro
- Music by: Koichi Morita
- Studio: Toei Animation
- Original network: FNS (Fuji TV)
- Original run: July 16, 1980 – April 1, 1981
- Episodes: 35

Genki, The Boy Champ (Japanese: がんばれ元気, Hepburn: Ganbare Genki) is a Japanese sports manga by Yū Koyama about Genki Horiguchi, a boy who is raised by a single father, and who wants to be a boxer like him. It was adapted as an anime television series by Toei Animation.

== Overview ==
The series was serialized in Shogakukan's Weekly Shonen Sunday from 1976 to 1981. It has been published in 28 tankobon volumes and 12 wide-format volumes by Shogakukan's Shonen Sunday Comics. It won the 22nd Shogakukan Manga Award in the Boys and Girls category in 1977.

It is considered a masterpiece of boxing manga, alongside Ashita no Joe (story by Asao Takamori, art by Tetsuya Chiba). The manga's powerful depictions of fights and the human drama surrounding the protagonist are its highlights.

Yu Koyama, who was once inspired by Ashita no Joe, began the series without any of the gags he had used in his previous works, wanting to tell a story of growth through fighting. While faithfully following the formula of existing sports manga, the series differs from "Joe" in its outlaw appeal by portraying a protagonist who is "cheerful, kind, and earnest" and whose circumstances include "growing up poor and losing both parents at a young age, only to be taken in by his wealthy maternal grandparents and living a comfortable life," marking a new approach to boxing manga.

The author has stated that he wrote this work with the intention of creating a story that is the complete opposite of Ashita no Joe. A prime example of this is the fact that Hideki Horiguchi, the father and mentor of the protagonist, Genki Horiguchi, refuses to entrust his unfulfilled dreams to his disciple, as Danpei Tange in Ashita no Joe and Ittetsu Hoshi in Star of the Giants do.

== Synopsis ==
Five-year-old Genki Horiguchi lives a life of travel with his father, Hideki Horiguchi, a traveling boxer. One day, his father decides to return to professional boxing. Despite fighting in the unfamiliar featherweight division, he enjoys a string of victories, but dies after a fierce battle with the boxing genius Kenji Seki. Time passes, and Seki becomes the world champion, reigning undefeated over the boxing world. Meanwhile, Genki is raised by his maternal grandparents and lives a comfortable life in the countryside. However, he secretly trains to fulfill the dream of his father, who died before his dream could be fulfilled. With the support of former boxer Eiji Mishima and his mentor Yuko Ashigawa, Genki grows up and moves to Tokyo alone after graduating from junior high school, aiming to defeat Seki and become a professional boxer.

== Anime TV ==
The anime series aired on Fuji TV from July 16, 1980 to April 1, 1981, with a total of 35 episodes, produced by Toei Animation.

It was expected to be a long-running series. Anticipating a long-running series with a successful run, the anime actually included original episodes to avoid overtaking the original work. Rintaro, the director, and Kazuo Komatsubara, the animation director, wanted to depict Genki's childhood in detail, but due to requests from sponsors and others, they decided to have him grow up to a middle school student midway through the series. At that point, Kazuo Komatsubara stepped down and was replaced as character designer and animation director by Takao Kosai.

The introduction of original episodes and clever direction toned down the "humid human drama" of the original work, and some praised the depiction of everyday life. However, the series was canceled just as it reached the episode about Eiji Mishima's death, and ended just as the final episode hinted at a match between Genki and Seki after moving to Tokyo. The series' successor, Dr. Slump became a huge hit, and Toei Animation continued to air in this time slot for approximately 21 years, until episodes 62 and 63 of One Piece aired on March 21, 2001.

The main writer Shunichi Yukimuro, art director Takao Mukuo, producer Matsuji Kishimoto, cinematographer Yoshifumi Sano, editor Masaaki Hanai, sound engineer Kenji Ninomiya, and music selector Shigeru Miyashita were also involved in the successor show Dr. Slump.

As of 2021, there are no plans for a satellite rebroadcast, but all 35 episodes have been available for free streaming on YouTube's Toei Animation Museum channel, with five episodes released every Thursday at noon for two weeks starting from September 9 of the same year. Additionally, on December 8 of the same year, Toei Video announced that they would release a Blu-ray disc called "Ganbare Genki Icchi Mime Blu-ray," which compiles all 35 episodes into one disc.

== Cast ==
- Genki Horiguchi (堀口 元気, Horiguchi Genki) – Toshiko Fujita
- Hideki Horiguchi (堀口 秀樹, Horiguchi Hideki) – Makio Inoue
- Kenji Seki (関 拳児, Seki Kenji) – Katsuji Mori
- Yuko Ashikawa (芦川 悠子, Ashikawa Yūko) – Kazuko Sugiyama
- Eiji Mishima (三島 栄司, Eiji Mishima) – Shūichi Ikeda
- Katsuzo Yamatani (山谷 勝三, Yamatani Katsuzō) – Hiroshi Masuoka
- Tomoko Ishida (石田 ともこ, Ishida Tomoko) – Keiko Han
- Eikichi Nagano (永野 英吉, Nagano Eikichi) a.k.a. Coach Nagano – Hiroshi Ōtake
- Takashi Kazan – Tōru Furuya
- Kisaburo Tanuma (田沼 樹三郎, Tanuma Kisaburō) – Ichirō Nagai
- Aiko Tanuma (田沼 愛子, Tanuma Aiko) – Shima Sakai
