= Wyolica =

Japanese musical duo

- Origin: Azumi (Sapporo, Japan); So-To (Osaka, Japan)
- Genres: Folk music, Chillout, J-Pop
- Years active: 1999~
- Labels: Epic Records Japan 1999–2004; Outreef Records 2009; BounDEE 2010
- Members: Azumi (vocals); So-To (guitar)

Wyolica (ワイヨリカ) is a Japanese two-piece folk-pop/chillout group. They consist of Azumi (vocals) and So-To (guitar) and debuted in 1999. The band's name is a neologism defined as "people of the grass fields.”

== Biography ==
Wyolica formed in 1997 when guitarist So-to met Azumi at a Sony audition. So-To has said his influences were Nick Heyward from Haircut One Hundred and Brian McKnight and he cut his teeth in an Earth, Wind & Fire tribute band during his college days. Azumi cites her main influences as Ella Fitzgerald and Keith Jarrett.

They released their debut single on 21 May 1999 titled Kanashii Wagamama (悲しいわがまま), produced by one of Japan's leading producers, Shinichi Osawa.

Their debut album, Who Said La La? was released in February 2000 and the group, who dubbed their music "Funky Soul," followed it up with two more albums by the end of 2003.

In 2003 Azumi left Wyolica to get married and moved to the United States, living in California. She returned as a solo artist in 2005, releasing three singles, Kick Up Kiss, Snowflake and Fly.

So-To went on to produce for artists such as Kou Shibasaki and Kousuke Atari.

The duo resumed in 2007 with acoustic live shows and released Balcony in 2009, followed by a digital-only single Boku wa Wasurenai on HearJapan. Feeling the need to celebrate a ten-year anniversary, the duo stepped up their activities with live dates in Osaka and Tokyo in June 2009. The duo have stated that their goal is a performance on UK music TV show Later... with Jools Holland.

Wyolica's latest album, Castle of Wind, appeared in September 2010.

== Discography ==
=== Studio albums ===
- 2000: Who said "La La..."?
- 2001: Almost Blues
- 2002: Folky Soul (mini-album)
- 2003: Fruits & Roots
- 2009: Balcony (mini-album)
- 2010: Castle of Wind

=== Compilations ===
- 2004: Wyolica Best Collection - All The Things You Are
