= Azumi Bebeji =

Nigerian politician

Azumi N. Bebeji

Member of the House of Representatives
- In office 2003–2007
- Constituency: Kiru/Bebeji Federal Constituency

Personal details
- Born: 1950 (age 75–76) Kano State, Nigeria
- Party: All Nigeria Peoples Party
- Occupation: Politician

Azumi N. Bebeji is a Nigerian politician who served as a member of the 5th National Assembly, representing the Kiru/Bebeji Federal Constituency from 2003 to 2007. She was affiliated with the All Nigeria Peoples Party (ANPP).

== Early life and education ==
Azumi N. Bebeji was born in 1950 in Kano State, Nigeria. She holds a Bachelor of Science degree in political science.

== Political career ==
In 2003, she was elected to the National Assembly to represent the Kiru/Bebeji Federal Constituency, serving until 2007, under the All Nigeria Peoples Party (ANPP). She was previously appointed as the Commissioner for Health.

== Awards and honours ==
Azumi N. Bebeji was awarded a trophy for Outstanding Performance in African Healthcare Delivery.

She succeeded Aliyu M. Yako and was succeeded by Kiru Ubale Jakada.
