= Azumi Sakai =

Japanese chess player (born 1991)

Personal information
- Born: February 14, 1991 (age 35)

Chess career
- Country: Japan
- Title: Woman Candidate Master (2019)
- Peak rating: 1900 (January 2025)

Azumi Sakai (坂井 あづみ, Sakai Azumi; born February 14, 1991) is a Japanese chess player.

== Chess career ==
In July 2023, she won the Japanese Women's Chess Championship with a perfect score of 6/6.

In September 2024, she played on the top board for Japan at the 45th Chess Olympiad, where she scored 4.5/9 and notably defeated grandmaster Ketevan Arakhamia-Grant in round 9.

== Personal life ==
She earned a master's degree in physics from Sophia University.
