= Jun Azumi (voice actor) =

Japanese voice actor, narrator, and DJ

Jun Azumi (安澄 純, Azumi Jun; born October 25) is a Japanese voice actor, narrator, and DJ who is affiliated with OYS Planning & Produce.

== Notable roles ==
=== Anime ===
==== 2002 ====
- Digimon Frontier (Man)

==== 2003 ====
- Zatch Bell! (Blizzard Thing, Lance)

==== 2004 ====
- Futari wa Pretty Cure (Football Staff)

==== 2006 ====
- Futari wa Precure Splash Star (Naoto Nikaido)
- Digimon: Data Squad (Group members)
- Air Gear (Saber Tiger)
- Hataraki Man (Itoh)

==== 2007 ====
- Yes! Precure 5 (Tiger)

==== Video games ====
===== 2004 =====
- Zatch Bell! Mamodo Fury (Lance)
