= Azumi =

Japanese manga series

- First tankōbon volume cover

あずみ
- Manga
- Written by: Yū Koyama
- Published by: Shogakukan
- Magazine: Big Comic Superior
- Original run: 1994 – 2008
- Volumes: 48
- Manga
- Written by: Yū Koyama
- Published by: Shogakukan
- Magazine: Big Comic Superior
- Original run: December 26, 2008 – February 28, 2014
- Volumes: 18
- icon

Azumi (あずみ) is a Japanese manga series written and illustrated by Yū Koyama. It was serialized in Shogakukan's seinen manga magazine Big Comic Superior from 1994 to 2008, with its chapters collected in 48 tankōbon volumes. A sequel series with the same title (rendered in all caps Latin-script) was serialized in the same magazine from 2008 to 2014, with its chapters collected in 18 tankōbon volumes. The story follows the title character, a young woman, brought up as part of a team of assassins charged with killing the warlords that threaten the uneasy peace in Feudal Japan in the aftermath of its long Sengoku civil war period.

The series has been adapted into two feature films starring Aya Ueto, Azumi in 2003 and Azumi 2: Death or Love in 2005, and a video game and a stage play in 2005.

Azumi received the Excellence Prize at the 1997 Japan Media Arts Festival and won the 43rd Shogakukan Manga Award in the general category in 1998.

== Plot ==
Azumi is a young female assassin operating after the Battle of Sekigahara. She eliminates supporters of the Toyotomi clan at the behest of Tokugawa Ieyasu, with these killings historically recorded as natural deaths. Raised in isolation by instructor Gensai Obata in Kiridani valley, Azumi trains with nine male students unaware of basic societal concepts. Their training culminates in two brutal initiation missions: first killing their closest companions (Azumi slays Nachi), then massacring an entire ninja village. As one of five surviving operatives, Azumi conducts political assassinations. Her work brings her into conflict with bandits, later revealed to be displaced samurai forced into criminality by Tokugawa policies. Throughout her missions, Azumi demonstrates exceptional survival skills compared to other warriors driven by singular motivations.

== Media ==
=== Manga ===
Written and illustrated by Yū Koyama, Azumi was serialized in Shogakukan's seinen manga magazine from 1994 to 2008. Shogakukan collected its chapters in forty-eight tankōbon volumes, released from January 30, 1995, to February 27, 2009. Shogakukan re-released the series in a twenty-four volume bunkoban edition, from January 14 to December 15, 2012.

A sequel series, also titled Azumi (Latin-script title in all caps), was serialized in the same magazine from December 26, 2008, to February 28, 2014. Shogakukan collected its chapters in eighteen tankōbon volumes, released from June 30, 2009, to April 30, 2014.

=== Film series ===
Azumi was loosely adapted into an live-action film directed by Ryuhei Kitamura in 2003. A sequel, Azumi 2: Death or Love, directed by Shusuke Kaneko, followed in 2005.

=== Video game ===
An action game for PlayStation 2, based on manga's original story, was developed by Gargoyle Mechanics and released in Japan only by Entertainment Software Publishing in 2005. The game was also re-released as part of the budget-range Simple series (Vol. 32).

=== Stage play ===
The theatrical version, directed by Okamura Toshikazu, premiered on April 3, 2005, starring Meisa Kuroki as Azumi.

=== Merchandise ===
Azumi Original Soundtrack containing music from the film was released by For Life Music in 2003. Azumi figure line based on the manga version was released by figuAX in 2006.

== Reception ==
Azumi received an Excellence Prize at the 1997 Japan Media Arts Festival, and won the 43rd Shogakukan Manga Award in the general category in 1998.
