= Yū Koyama =

Japanese manga artist

- Born: February 20, 1948 (age 78); Ogasa, Shizuoka Prefecture
- Occupation: Manga Artist
- Notable work: Ganbare Genki, O~i! Ryoma, Azumi
- Awards: 1977 Shogakukan Manga Award (Shōnen) 1998 Shogakukan Manga Award (General)

Yū Koyama (小山 ゆう, Koyama Yū; born 20 February 1948 in Ogasa, Shizuoka) is a Japanese manga artist. After graduating from Shizuoka Prefectural Shimada Commercial High School he moved to Tokyo and in 1968 took a job with Saito Productions, the company run by Takao Saitō. In 1971 he worked with Kazuo Koike at Studio Ship.

Koyama debuted in Shōnen Sunday in 1973 with Ore wa Chokkaku. He has won multiple awards in the manga field, winning the Shogakukan Manga Award twice, once in 1977 for Ganbare Genki and again in 1998 for Azumi. Azumi also won an Excellence Award at the 1997 Japan Media Arts Festival.

== Works ==
- Ore wa Chokkaku (おれは直角)
- Ganbare Genki (がんばれ元気)
- O~i! Ryoma (お〜い!竜馬)
- Change (チェンジ)
- Sprinter (スプリンター)
- Ai ga Yuku (愛がゆく)
- Azumi (あずみ)
- Momotaro (ももたろう)
- Kaze no Saburō (風の三郎)
- Samurai Kazuma (サムライ数馬)
- Harajuku Story (原宿ストーリー)
- Iza! Ryoma (いざ!竜馬)
