= Table tennis at the 2010 Asian Games – Mixed doubles =

Mixed doubles at the 2010 Asian Games
- Venue: Guangzhou Gymnasium
- Dates: 15–19 November 2010
- Competitors: 64 from 20 nations

Medalists
| gold medal | Xu Xin; Guo Yan | China |
| silver medal | Cheung Yuk; Jiang Huajun | Hong Kong |
| bronze medal | Seiya Kishikawa; Ai Fukuhara | Japan |
| bronze medal | Kenta Matsudaira; Kasumi Ishikawa | Japan |

The mixed doubles table tennis event was part of the table tennis programme and took place between November 15 and 19, at the Guangzhou Gymnasium.

== Schedule ==
All times are China Standard Time (UTC+08:00)

| Date | Time | Event |
|---|---|---|
| Monday, 15 November 2010 | 10:00 | 1/16 round |
| Tuesday, 16 November 2010 | 10:00 | 1/8 finals |
| Wednesday, 17 November 2010 | 19:00 | Quarterfinals |
| Thursday, 18 November 2010 | 21:00 | Semifinals |
| Friday, 19 November 2010 | 14:00 | Final |

== Results ==
Legend

- WO — Won by walkover

=== Finals ===
| Semifinals | | | | | | | | | Final |
| 1 | Xu Xin (CHN); Guo Yan (CHN) | 11 | 11 | 11 | 11 |
| | Kenta Matsudaira (JPN); Kasumi Ishikawa (JPN) | 8 | 5 | 8 | 6 | | | | 1 | Xu Xin (CHN); Guo Yan (CHN) | 15 | 11 | 7 | 11 | 11 |
| 8 | Seiya Kishikawa (JPN); Ai Fukuhara (JPN) | 6 | 5 | 11 | 3 | 11 | 14 | 9 | 7 | Cheung Yuk (HKG); Jiang Huajun (HKG) | 13 | 8 | 11 | 8 | 3 |
| 7 | Cheung Yuk (HKG); Jiang Huajun (HKG) | 11 | 11 | 5 | 11 | 2 | 12 | 11 |

=== Top half ===
==== Section 1 ====
1/16 round
1 | Xu Xin (CHN); Guo Yan (CHN) | 11 | 11 | 11
Rachid El-Boubou (LIB); Tvin Carole Moumjoghlian (LIB) | 4 | 2 | 4
Raşid Ahmedow (TKM); Jennet Hanowa (TKM) | 11 | 11 | 11
Chandan Shahi (NEP); Elina Maharjan (NEP) | 3 | 5 | 5
Bibishyn Bayarmagnai (MGL); Surakhbayaryn Misheel (MGL) | 3 | 6 | 4
Yahya Mossly (SYR); Souha Annos (SYR) | 11 | 11 | 11
Yang Zi (SIN); Wang Yuegu (SIN) | 11 | 6 | 11 | 9 | 7
5 | Tang Peng (HKG); Tie Ya Na (HKG) | 8 | 11 | 5 | 11 | 11

1/8 finals
1 | Xu Xin (CHN); Guo Yan (CHN) | 11 | 11 | 11
Raşid Ahmedow (TKM); Jennet Hanowa (TKM) | 3 | 4 | 3
Yahya Mossly (SYR); Souha Annos (SYR) | 5 | 3 | 5
5 | Tang Peng (HKG); Tie Ya Na (HKG) | 11 | 11 | 11

Quarterfinals
1 | Xu Xin (CHN); Guo Yan (CHN) | 11 | 11 | 11 | 14
5 | Tang Peng (HKG); Tie Ya Na (HKG) | 13 | 7 | 4 | 12

==== Section 2 ====
1/16 round
6 | Chuang Chih-yuan (TPE); Huang Yi-hua (TPE) | 11 | 11 | 11
Anthony Amalraj (IND); Madhurika Patkar (IND) | 8 | 5 | 4
Đoàn Kiến Quốc (VIE); Mai Xuân Hằng (VIE) | 2 | 2 | 6
Ri Chol-guk (PRK); Kim Hye-song (PRK) | 11 | 11 | 11
Leong Kin Wa (MAC); Cheong Cheng I (MAC) | 9 | 11 | 10 | 11 | 12
Thavisack Phathaphone (LAO); Sengdavieng Douangpanya (LAO) | 11 | 4 | 12 | 3 | 10
Kenta Matsudaira (JPN); Kasumi Ishikawa (JPN) | 11 | 12 | 11
3 | Joo Sae-hyuk (KOR); Kim Kyung-ah (KOR) | 6 | 10 | 9

1/8 finals
6 | Chuang Chih-yuan (TPE); Huang Yi-hua (TPE) | 12 | 4 | 7 | 8
Ri Chol-guk (PRK); Kim Hye-Song (PRK) | 10 | 11 | 11 | 11
Leong Kin Wa (MAC); Cheong Cheng I (MAC) | 4 | 2 | 4
Kenta Matsudaira (JPN); Kasumi Ishikawa (JPN) | 11 | 11 | 11

Quarterfinals
Ri Chol-guk (PRK); Kim Hye-song (PRK) | 4 | 6 | 7
Kenta Matsudaira (JPN); Kasumi Ishikawa (JPN) | 11 | 11 | 11

=== Bottom half ===
==== Section 3 ====
1/16 round
4 | Gao Ning (SIN); Feng Tianwei (SIN) | 9 | 10 | 13 | 16 | 5
Wu Chih-chi (TPE); Cheng I-ching (TPE) | 11 | 12 | 11 | 14 | 11
Rohan Sirisena (SRI); Ishara Madurangi (SRI) | 11 | 6 | 11 | 15 | 11
Chang Hoi Wa (MAC); Ma Chao In (MAC) | 7 | 11 | 13 | 13 | 8
Sharath Kamal (IND); Shamini Kumaresan (IND) | 11 | 4 | 14 | 12
Đinh Quang Linh (VIE); Lương Thị Tám (VIE) | 3 | 11 | 12 | 10
Kim Hyok-bong (PRK); Kim Jong (PRK) | 5 | 11 | 8 | 11 | 3
8 | Seiya Kishikawa (JPN); Ai Fukuhara (JPN) | 11 | 5 | 11 | 4 | 11

1/8 finals
Wu Chih-chi (TPE); Cheng I-ching (TPE) | 11 | 11 | 11
Rohan Sirisena (SRI); Ishara Madurangi (SRI) | 8 | 8 | 5
Sharath Kamal (IND); Shamini Kumaresan (IND) | 12 | 4 | 11 | 2 | 6
8 | Seiya Kishikawa (JPN); Ai Fukuhara (JPN) | 10 | 11 | 8 | 11 | 11

Quarterfinals
Wu Chih-chi (TPE); Cheng I-ching (TPE) | 6 | 7 | 6
8 | Seiya Kishikawa (JPN); Ai Fukuhara (JPN) | 11 | 11 | 11

==== Section 4 ====
1/16 round
7 | Cheung Yuk (HKG); Jiang Huajun (HKG) | 11 | 11 | 11
Inom Saidov (TJK); Sumayai Amiri (TJK) | 4 | 4 | 5
Mohd Shakirin Ibrahim (MAS); Beh Lee Wei (MAS) | 11 | 11 | 11
Chansamone Khunladsuvannavong (LAO); Sengdavy Phiathep (LAO) | 2 | 4 | 5
Lee Jung-woo (KOR); Seok Ha-jung (KOR) | 11 | 11 | 11
Ajay Suwal (NEP); Rabina Deshar (NEP) | 3 | 1 | 1
Fahed Al-Mughanne (QAT); Aya Majdi (QAT)
2 | Zhang Jike (CHN); Ding Ning (CHN) | W | O

1/8 finals
7 | Cheung Yuk (HKG); Jiang Huajun (HKG) | 11 | 11 | 11
Mohd Shakirin Ibrahim (MAS); Beh Lee Wei (MAS) | 5 | 6 | 7
Lee Jung-woo (KOR); Seok Ha-jung (KOR) | 3 | 7 | 2
2 | Zhang Jike (CHN); Ding Ning (CHN) | 11 | 11 | 11

Quarterfinals
7 | Cheung Yuk (HKG); Jiang Huajun (HKG) | 6 | 12 | 11 | 7 | 11
2 | Zhang Jike (CHN); Ding Ning (CHN) | 11 | 10 | 7 | 11 | 7
