= Table tennis at the 2010 Asian Games =

- Venue: Guangzhou Gymnasium
- Dates: 13–20 November 2010
- Competitors: 172 from 29 nations

Table tennis at the 2010 Asian Games was held in Guangzhou Gymnasium, Guangzhou, China from November 13 to 20, 2010. Singles, doubles, and team events were held at Guangzhou Gymnasium.

China, as the host country, dominated the competition by winning all seven gold medals.

== Schedule ==
P	Preliminary rounds	¼	Quarterfinals	½	Semifinals	F	Final

Event↓/Date →	13th Sat	14th Sun		15th Mon	16th Tue	17th Wed	18th Thu		19th Fri		20th Sat	
Men's singles				P		P	P	¼			½	F
Men's doubles					P		P	¼	½	F		
Men's team	P	P	¼	½	F							
Women's singles				P			P	¼			½	F
Women's doubles						P	P	¼	½	F		
Women's team	P	P	¼	½	F							
Mixed doubles				P	P	¼	½		F			

== Medalists ==
Event	Gold	Silver	Bronze
Men's singles	Ma Long; China	Wang Hao; China	Joo Sae-hyuk; South Korea
Men's singles	Ma Long; China	Wang Hao; China	Jun Mizutani; Japan
Men's doubles	China; Wang Hao; Zhang Jike	China; Ma Lin; Xu Xin	South Korea; Jeoung Young-sik; Kim Min-seok
Men's doubles	China; Wang Hao; Zhang Jike	China; Ma Lin; Xu Xin	Japan; Kenta Matsudaira; Koki Niwa
Men's team	China; Ma Lin; Ma Long; Wang Hao; Xu Xin; Zhang Jike	South Korea; Jeoung Young-sik; Joo Sae-hyuk; Kim Min-seok; Lee Jung-woo; Oh Sang-eun	Japan; Seiya Kishikawa; Kenta Matsudaira; Jun Mizutani; Koki Niwa; Kaii Yoshida
Men's team	China; Ma Lin; Ma Long; Wang Hao; Xu Xin; Zhang Jike	South Korea; Jeoung Young-sik; Joo Sae-hyuk; Kim Min-seok; Lee Jung-woo; Oh Sang-eun	North Korea; Jang Song-man; Kim Chol-jin; Kim Hyok-bong; Kim Nam-chol; Ri Chol-guk
Women's singles	Li Xiaoxia; China	Guo Yue; China	Kim Kyung-ah; South Korea
Women's singles	Li Xiaoxia; China	Guo Yue; China	Ai Fukuhara; Japan
Women's doubles	China; Guo Yue; Li Xiaoxia	China; Ding Ning; Liu Shiwen	Japan; Ai Fukuhara; Kasumi Ishikawa
Women's doubles	China; Guo Yue; Li Xiaoxia	China; Ding Ning; Liu Shiwen	Japan; Hiroko Fujii; Misako Wakamiya
Women's team	China; Ding Ning; Guo Yan; Guo Yue; Li Xiaoxia; Liu Shiwen	Singapore; Feng Tianwei; Li Jiawei; Sun Beibei; Wang Yuegu; Yu Mengyu	South Korea; Kim Kyung-ah; Moon Hyun-jung; Park Mi-young; Seok Ha-jung; Yang Ha-eun
Women's team	China; Ding Ning; Guo Yan; Guo Yue; Li Xiaoxia; Liu Shiwen	Singapore; Feng Tianwei; Li Jiawei; Sun Beibei; Wang Yuegu; Yu Mengyu	North Korea; Han Hye-song; Hyon Ryon-hui; Kim Hye-song; Kim Jong; Sin Hye-song
Mixed doubles	China; Xu Xin; Guo Yan	Hong Kong; Cheung Yuk; Jiang Huajun	Japan; Seiya Kishikawa; Ai Fukuhara
Mixed doubles	China; Xu Xin; Guo Yan	Hong Kong; Cheung Yuk; Jiang Huajun	Japan; Kenta Matsudaira; Kasumi Ishikawa

== Medal table ==
Rank	Nation	Gold	Silver	Bronze	Total
1	China (CHN)	7	4	0	11
2	South Korea (KOR)	0	1	4	5
3	Hong Kong (HKG)	0	1	0	1
3	Singapore (SIN)	0	1	0	1
5	Japan (JPN)	0	0	8	8
6	North Korea (PRK)	0	0	2	2
Totals (6 entries)		7	7	14	28

== Participating nations ==
A total of 172 athletes from 29 nations competed in table tennis at the 2010 Asian Games:

- Athletes from Kuwait (2)
- China (10)
- Chinese Taipei (10)
- Hong Kong (10)
- India (10)
- Iran (3)
- Japan (10)
- Laos (9)
- Lebanon (2)
- Macau (4)
- Malaysia (4)
- Maldives (3)
- Mongolia (5)
- Nepal (10)
- North Korea (10)
- Palestine (3)
- Qatar (10)
- Saudi Arabia (4)
- Singapore (10)
- South Korea (10)
- Sri Lanka (2)
- Syria (3)
- Tajikistan (5)
- Thailand (5)
- Timor-Leste (2)
- Turkmenistan (2)
- United Arab Emirates (2)
- Uzbekistan (4)
- Vietnam (8)
