= Soft tennis at the 2010 Asian Games – Men's singles =

Men's singles at the 2010 Asian Games
- Venue: Tianhe Tennis School
- Dates: 16–17 November 2010
- Competitors: 19 from 10 nations

Medalists
gold medal	Lee Yo-han	South Korea
silver medal	Bae Hwan-sung	South Korea
bronze medal	Yang Sheng-fa	Chinese Taipei
bronze medal	Keiya Nakamoto	Japan

The men's singles soft tennis event was part of the soft tennis programme and took place between November 16 and 17, at the Tianhe Tennis School.

== Schedule ==
All times are China Standard Time (UTC+08:00)

Date	Time	Event
Tuesday, 16 November 2010	10:30	Preliminary round
Tuesday, 16 November 2010	15:30	1st round
Tuesday, 16 November 2010	16:30	Quarterfinals
Wednesday, 17 November 2010	10:30	Semifinals
Wednesday, 17 November 2010	15:30	Final

== Results ==
Legend

- WO — Won by walkover

=== Preliminary round ===
==== Group A ====
Pos	Athlete	Pld	W	L	GF	GA	GD	Qualification
1	Chen Mingdong (CHN)	2	2	0	8	2	+6	Quarterfinals
2	Hidenori Shinohara (JPN)	2	1	1	5	4	+1	1st round
3	Donedy Keodalasouk (LAO)	2	0	2	1	8	−7	

Source: OCA

	Score		Game						
	Score		1	2	3	4	5	6	7
Chen Mingdong (CHN)	4–1	Donedy Keodalasouk (LAO)	4–6	4–2	4–0	4–1	9–7		
Hidenori Shinohara (JPN)	4–0	Donedy Keodalasouk (LAO)	4–0	8–6	4–1	4–0			
Hidenori Shinohara (JPN)	1–4	Chen Mingdong (CHN)	1–4	4–1	2–4	3–5	3–5		

==== Group B ====
Pos	Athlete	Pld	W	L	GF	GA	GD	Qualification
1	Yang Sheng-fa (TPE)	3	2 (Note: Tied on head-to-head wins (1). Head-to-head game difference: TPE +2, MGL +1, PHI −3.)	1	10	4	+6	Quarterfinals
2	Radnaabazaryn Bayartogtokh (MGL)	3	2	1	11	6	+5	Quarterfinals
3	Samuel Noguit (PHI)	3	2	1	8	7	+1	
4	Ashok Singh (NEP)	3	0	3	0	12	−12	

Source: OCA
Notes:

	Score		Game						
	Score		1	2	3	4	5	6	7
Yang Sheng-fa (TPE)	4–0	Ashok Singh (NEP)	4–0	4–2	5–3	5–3			
Radnaabazaryn Bayartogtokh (MGL)	3–4	Samuel Noguit (PHI)	2–4	4–2	4–6	4–6	4–2	4–1	1–7
Yang Sheng-fa (TPE)	4–0	Samuel Noguit (PHI)	4–0	8–6	5–3	4–2			
Radnaabazaryn Bayartogtokh (MGL)	4–0	Ashok Singh (NEP)	6–4	4–2	4–2	4–2			
Yang Sheng-fa (TPE)	2–4	Radnaabazaryn Bayartogtokh (MGL)	4–1	0–4	4–2	1–4	2–4	1–4	
Samuel Noguit (PHI)	4–0	Ashok Singh (NEP)	6–4	4–2	4–1	6–4			

==== Group C ====
Pos	Athlete	Pld	W	L	GF	GA	GD	Qualification
1	Manoj Subba (NEP)	3	3	0	12	7	+5	Quarterfinals
2	Lee Yo-han (KOR)	3	2	1	11	4	+7	1st round
3	Navneet Kumar (IND)	3	1	2	5	9	−4	
4	Ananda Khamphoumy (LAO)	3	0	3	4	12	−8	

Source: OCA

	Score		Game						
	Score		1	2	3	4	5	6	7
Lee Yo-han (KOR)	4–0	Ananda Khamphoumy (LAO)	4–2	4–0	4–1	4–2			
Manoj Subba (NEP)	4–1	Navneet Kumar (IND)	4–1	5–3	0–4	5–3	4–2		
Manoj Subba (NEP)	4–3	Ananda Khamphoumy (LAO)	5–3	4–6	6–8	4–2	2–4	4–0	9–7
Lee Yo-han (KOR)	4–0	Navneet Kumar (IND)	5–3	4–2	4–2	5–3			
Lee Yo-han (KOR)	3–4	Manoj Subba (NEP)	4–2	13–11	1–4	2–4	3–5	4–2	3–7
Navneet Kumar (IND)	4–1	Ananda Khamphoumy (LAO)	4–2	4–1	4–1	2–4	4–1		

==== Group D ====
Pos	Athlete	Pld	W	L	GF	GA	GD	Qualification
1	Keiya Nakamoto (JPN)	3	3	0	12	5	+7	Quarterfinals
2	Bae Hwan-sung (KOR)	3	2	1	11	5	+6	1st round
3	Joseph Arcilla (PHI)	3	1	2	3	8	−5	
4	Ochirsaikhany Bayasgalant (MGL)	3	0	3	0	8	−8	

Source: OCA

	Score		Game						
	Score		1	2	3	4	5	6	7
Bae Hwan-sung (KOR)	4–0	Ochirsaikhany Bayasgalant (MGL)	4–1	4–2	4–0	7–5			
Keiya Nakamoto (JPN)	4–2	Joseph Arcilla (PHI)	4–1	4–1	6–4	4–6	3–5	4–0	
Bae Hwan-sung (KOR)	4–1	Joseph Arcilla (PHI)	1–4	4–1	4–2	4–2	4–2		
Keiya Nakamoto (JPN)	4–0	Ochirsaikhany Bayasgalant (MGL)	4–2	5–3	4–2	4–2			
Bae Hwan-sung (KOR)	3–4	Keiya Nakamoto (JPN)	6–4	2–4	4–1	1–4	1–4	4–2	6–8
Joseph Arcilla (PHI)	WO	Ochirsaikhany Bayasgalant (MGL)							

==== Group E ====
Pos	Athlete	Pld	W	L	GF	GA	GD	Qualification
1	Shi Bo (CHN)	3	3	0	12	3	+9	Quarterfinals
2	Kuo Chia-wei (TPE)	3	2	1	11	5	+6	1st round
3	Jitender Singh Mehlda (IND)	3	1	2	5	8	−3	
4	Rahmatullojon Rajabaliev (TJK)	3	0	3	0	12	−12	

Source: OCA

	Score		Game						
	Score		1	2	3	4	5	6	7
Kuo Chia-wei (TPE)	4–0	Rahmatullojon Rajabaliev (TJK)	4–0	5–3	4–1	4–2			
Shi Bo (CHN)	4–0	Jitender Singh Mehlda (IND)	4–2	5–3	4–0	4–0			
Shi Bo (CHN)	4–0	Rahmatullojon Rajabaliev (TJK)	4–0	4–0	4–0	6–4			
Kuo Chia-wei (TPE)	4–1	Jitender Singh Mehlda (IND)	1–4	6–4	4–1	4–0	4–1		
Jitender Singh Mehlda (IND)	4–0	Rahmatullojon Rajabaliev (TJK)	6–4	4–1	4–2	4–1			
Kuo Chia-wei (TPE)	3–4	Shi Bo (CHN)	4–6	2–4	2–4	4–0	4–2	4–0	6–8

=== Knockout round ===
==== Final ====
Final
D2	Bae Hwan-sung (KOR)	2	0	4	3	4	2
C2	Lee Yo-han (KOR)	4	4	1	5	1	4

==== Top half ====
1st round								Quarterfinals									Semifinals
								A1	Chen Mingdong (CHN)	0	5	1	4	1	4	3
E2	Kuo Chia-wei (TPE)	1	5	1	1	4	1	D2	Bae Hwan-sung (KOR)	4	3	4	1	4	2	7
D2	Bae Hwan-sung (KOR)	4	3	4	4	2	4										D2	Bae Hwan-sung (KOR)	5	4	1	4	4
																	B1	Yang Sheng-fa (TPE)	3	2	4	2	0
								B1	Yang Sheng-fa (TPE)	4	4	4	4
								C1	Manoj Subba (NEP)	1	0	1	2

==== Bottom half ====
1st round							Quarterfinals							Semifinals
							D1	Keiya Nakamoto (JPN)	4	4	4	5
							B2	Radnaabazaryn Bayartogtokh (MGL)	0	2	1	3
														D1	Keiya Nakamoto (JPN)	5	4	2	4	1	5	2
C2	Lee Yo-han (KOR)	3	4	4	4	8								C2	Lee Yo-han (KOR)	3	2	4	2	4	7	7
A2	Hidenori Shinohara (JPN)	5	0	1	2	6	C2	Lee Yo-han (KOR)	4	4	2	5	4
							E1	Shi Bo (CHN)	0	1	4	3	0
