= Soft tennis at the 2010 Asian Games =

- Venue: Tianhe Tennis School
- Dates: 13–19 November 2010
- Competitors: 85 from 11 nations

Soft tennis at the 2010 Asian Games was held in Guangzhou, China from 13 November 2010 to 19 November 2010. All events were held at Tianhe Tennis School.

Soft tennis had team, doubles and singles events for men and women, as well as a mixed doubles competition. South Korea, Chinese Taipei and Japan dominated the competition, China also won the remaining gold medal.

== Schedule ==
P	Preliminary rounds	¼	Quarterfinals	½	Semifinals	F	Final

Event↓/Date →	13th Sat	14th Sun		15th Mon				16th Tue		17th Wed		18th Thu		19th Fri	
Men's singles								P	¼	½	F				
Men's doubles												P	¼	½	F
Men's team	P	½	F												
Women's singles								P	¼	½	F				
Women's doubles												P	¼	½	F
Women's team	P	½	F												
Mixed doubles				P	¼	½	F								

== Medalists ==
Event	Gold	Silver	Bronze
Men's singles	Lee Yo-han; South Korea	Bae Hwan-sung; South Korea	Yang Sheng-fa; Chinese Taipei
Men's singles	Lee Yo-han; South Korea	Bae Hwan-sung; South Korea	Keiya Nakamoto; Japan
Men's doubles	Chinese Taipei; Li Chia-hung; Yang Sheng-fa	South Korea; Bae Hwan-sung; Kim Tae-jung	Japan; Koji Kobayashi; Hidenori Shinohara
Men's doubles	Chinese Taipei; Li Chia-hung; Yang Sheng-fa	South Korea; Bae Hwan-sung; Kim Tae-jung	Japan; Shigeo Nakahori; Tsuneo Takagawa
Men's team	Chinese Taipei; Kuo Chia-wei; Li Chia-hung; Lin Ting-chun; Liu Chia-lun; Yang Sheng-fa	Japan; Koji Kobayashi; Shigeo Nakahori; Keiya Nakamoto; Hidenori Shinohara; Tsuneo Takagawa	South Korea; Bae Hwan-sung; Ji Yong-min; Kim Tae-jung; Lee Yeon; Lee Yo-han
Men's team	Chinese Taipei; Kuo Chia-wei; Li Chia-hung; Lin Ting-chun; Liu Chia-lun; Yang Sheng-fa	Japan; Koji Kobayashi; Shigeo Nakahori; Keiya Nakamoto; Hidenori Shinohara; Tsuneo Takagawa	China; Chai Jin; Chen Mingdong; Jiao Yang; Li Xiang; Shi Bo
Women's singles	Zhao Lei; China	Kim Ae-kyung; South Korea	Chiang Wan-chi; Chinese Taipei
Women's singles	Zhao Lei; China	Kim Ae-kyung; South Korea	Kim Kyung-ryun; South Korea
Women's doubles	Japan; Hitomi Sugimoto; Eri Uehara	South Korea; Joo Og; Kim Ae-kyung	China; Xin Yani; Zhao Lei
Women's doubles	Japan; Hitomi Sugimoto; Eri Uehara	South Korea; Joo Og; Kim Ae-kyung	Japan; Ayaka Oba; Mai Sasaki
Women's team	Japan; Kana Morihara; Ayaka Oba; Mai Sasaki; Hitomi Sugimoto; Eri Uehara	Chinese Taipei; Chang Wen-hsin; Cheng Chu-ling; Chiang Wan-chi; Chu Yun-hsuan; Hang Chia-ling	South Korea; Joo Og; Kim Ae-kyung; Kim Kyung-ryun; Kwon Ran-hee; Park Soon-joung
Women's team	Japan; Kana Morihara; Ayaka Oba; Mai Sasaki; Hitomi Sugimoto; Eri Uehara	Chinese Taipei; Chang Wen-hsin; Cheng Chu-ling; Chiang Wan-chi; Chu Yun-hsuan; Hang Chia-ling	China; Gao Tong; Hao Jie; Qiu Sisi; Xin Yani; Zhao Lei
Mixed doubles	South Korea; Ji Yong-min; Kim Kyung-ryun	Chinese Taipei; Li Chia-hung; Cheng Chu-ling	Chinese Taipei; Liu Chia-lun; Hang Chia-ling
Mixed doubles	South Korea; Ji Yong-min; Kim Kyung-ryun	Chinese Taipei; Li Chia-hung; Cheng Chu-ling	South Korea; Kim Tae-jung; Kim Ae-kyung

== Medal table ==
Rank	Nation	Gold	Silver	Bronze	Total
1	South Korea (KOR)	2	4	4	10
2	Chinese Taipei (TPE)	2	2	3	7
3	Japan (JPN)	2	1	4	7
4	China (CHN)	1	0	3	4
Totals (4 entries)		7	7	14	28

== Participating nations ==
A total of 85 athletes from 11 nations competed in soft tennis at the 2010 Asian Games:

- China (10)
- Chinese Taipei (10)
- India (8)
- Japan (10)
- Laos (5)
- Mongolia (10)
- Nepal (5)
- North Korea (5)
- Philippines (10)
- South Korea (10)
- Tajikistan (2)
