= Table tennis at the 2010 Asian Games – Women's team =

Women's team at the 2010 Asian Games
- Venue: Guangzhou Gymnasium
- Dates: 13–16 November 2010
- Competitors: 76 from 17 nations

Medalists
gold medal	China; Ding Ning, Guo Yan, Guo Yue, Li Xiaoxia, Liu Shiwen
silver medal	Singapore; Feng Tianwei, Li Jiawei, Sun Beibei, Wang Yuegu, Yu Mengyu
bronze medal	South Korea; Kim Kyung-ah, Moon Hyun-jung, Park Mi-young, Seok Ha-jung, Yang Ha-eun
bronze medal	North Korea; Han Hye-song, Hyon Ryon-hui, Kim Hye-song, Kim Jong, Sin Hye-song

The women's team table tennis event was part of the table tennis programme and took place between November 13 and 16, at the Guangzhou Gymnasium.

== Schedule ==
All times are China Standard Time (UTC+08:00)

Date	Time	Event
Saturday, 13 November 2010	10:00	Round robin 1
Saturday, 13 November 2010	14:00	Round robin 2
Saturday, 13 November 2010	18:00	Round robin 3
Sunday, 14 November 2010	10:00	Round robin 4
Sunday, 14 November 2010	14:00	Round robin 5
Sunday, 14 November 2010	20:00	Quarterfinals
Monday, 15 November 2010	19:00	Semifinals
Tuesday, 16 November 2010	14:30	Final

== Results ==
=== Round robin ===
==== Group A ====
Pos	Team	Pld	W	L	MF	MA	Pts	Qualification
1	China	3	3	0	9	1	6	Quarterfinals
2	Japan	3	2	1	6	4	5	Quarterfinals
3	Chinese Taipei	3	1	2	5	6	4	
4	Tajikistan	3	0	3	0	9	3	

Source: ATTU

13 November	China	3–1	Chinese Taipei

Guo Yue	1–3	Cheng I-ching	6–11, 6–11, 11–9, 5–11
Liu Shiwen	3–0	Huang Yi-hua	11–4, 11–8, 11–6
Li Xiaoxia	3–0	Hsiung Nai-i	11–2, 13–11, 11–7
Guo Yue	3–2	Huang Yi-hua	9–11, 3–11, 11–7, 11–7, 11–9

13 November	Japan	3–0	Tajikistan

Sayaka Hirano	3–0	Zulfiniso Saidalimova	11–3, 11–5, 11–1
Kasumi Ishikawa	3–0	Sumayai Amiri	11–2, 11–4, 11–7
Ai Fukuhara	3–0	Aziza Karieva	11–3, 11–5, 11–2

13 November	Japan	0–3	China

Kasumi Ishikawa	0–3	Li Xiaoxia	7–11, 4–11, 2–11
Ai Fukuhara	0–3	Guo Yue	8–11, 5–11, 7–11
Sayaka Hirano	0–3	Guo Yan	7–11, 7–11, 9–11

13 November	Chinese Taipei	3–0	Tajikistan

Huang Yi-hua	3–0	Sumayai Amiri	11–4, 11–3, 11–4
Cheng I-ching	3–0	Zulfiniso Saidalimova	11–1, 11–4, 11–4
Lee I-chen	3–0	Aziza Karieva	11–1, 11–3, 11–2

14 November	Tajikistan	0–3	China

Sumayai Amiri	0–3	Liu Shiwen	2–11, 5–11, 2–11
Zulfiniso Saidalimova	0–3	Ding Ning	1–11, 2–11, 3–11
Aziza Karieva	0–3	Guo Yan	2–11, 1–11, 1–11

14 November	Chinese Taipei	1–3	Japan

Huang Yi-hua	1–3	Ai Fukuhara	11–8, 1–11, 5–11, 6–11
Cheng I-ching	3–1	Sayaka Hirano	20–18, 6–11, 11–7, 11–6
Hsiung Nai-i	1–3	Kasumi Ishikawa	11–9, 7–11, 1–11, 6–11
Huang Yi-hua	2–3	Sayaka Hirano	5–11, 11–6, 12–10, 12–14, 3–11

==== Group B ====
Pos	Team	Pld	W	L	MF	MA	Pts	Qualification
1	Singapore	3	3	0	9	0	6	Quarterfinals
2	India	3	2	1	6	3	5	Quarterfinals
3	Laos	3	1	2	3	6	4	
4	Maldives	3	0	3	0	9	3	

Source: ATTU

13 November	Maldives	0–3	Singapore

Mueena Mohamed	0–3	Wang Yuegu	1–11, 1–11, 1–11
Fathimath Jumana Nimal	0–3	Feng Tianwei	2–11, 3–11, 6–11
Aminath Shiura Shareef	0–3	Li Jiawei	4–11, 2–11, 1–11

13 November	India	3–0	Laos

Shamini Kumaresan	3–0	Thiphakone Southamavong	11–5, 11–7, 11–4
Madhurika Patkar	3–1	Sengdavieng Douangpanya	11–7, 11–3, 9–11, 11–6
Mouma Das	3–0	Sengdavy Phiathep	11–5, 11–6, 11–2

13 November	Singapore	3–0	India

Feng Tianwei	3–2	Madhurika Patkar	11–6, 11–3, 7–11, 10–12, 11–4
Wang Yuegu	3–1	Shamini Kumaresan	7–11, 11–5, 11–9, 11–5
Li Jiawei	3–0	Poulomi Ghatak	11–2, 11–1, 11–0, Retired

13 November	Maldives	0–3	Laos

Mueena Mohamed	2–3	Thiphakone Southamavong	12–10, 11–9, 7–11, 6–11, 6–11
Fathimath Jumana Nimal	2–3	Sengdavieng Douangpanya	8–11, 11–13, 11–7, 11–4, 9–11
Aminath Shiura Shareef	1–3	Sengdavy Phiathep	3–11, 11–8, 2–11, 10–12

14 November	Singapore	3–0	Laos

Wang Yuegu	3–0	Thiphakone Southamavong	11–4, 11–3, 11–6
Sun Beibei	3–0	Sengdavieng Douangpanya	11–7, 11–4, 11–5
Feng Tianwei	3–0	Dalavone Manichanh	11–2, 11–3, 11–1

14 November	Maldives	0–3	India

Mueena Mohamed	0–3	Mamta Prabhu	6–11, 6–11, 7–11
Fathimath Jumana Nimal	0–3	Madhurika Patkar	3–11, 6–11, 5–11
Aminath Shiura Shareef	0–3	Shamini Kumaresan	4–11, 4–11, 1–11

==== Group C ====
Pos	Team	Pld	W	L	MF	MA	Pts	Qualification
1	North Korea	4	4	0	12	1	8	Quarterfinals
2	Thailand	4	3	1	10	4	7	Quarterfinals
3	Vietnam	4	2	2	7	6	6	
4	Uzbekistan	4	1	3	3	9	5	
5	Nepal	4	0	4	0	12	4	

Source: ATTU

13 November	North Korea	3–0	Vietnam

Kim Jong	3–1	Mai Hoàng Mỹ Trang	11–4, 8–11, 11–9, 11–3
Kim Hye-song	3–1	Mai Xuân Hằng	11–2, 11–6, 8–11, 11–5
Hyon Ryon-hui	3–0	Phạm Thị Thiên Kim	11–4, 11–7, 12–10

13 November	Thailand	3–0	Uzbekistan

Nanthana Komwong	3–0	Olga Kim	11–4, 11–6, 11–3
Suthasini Sawettabut	3–0	Indira Kagirova	11–2, 13–11, 11–6
Anisara Muangsuk	3–0	Nodira Burkhankhodjaeva	11–2, 11–8, 11–0

13 November	North Korea	3–0	Nepal

Kim Jong	3–0	Renuka Khatri	11–5, 11–2, 11–2
Kim Hye-song	3–0	Nabita Shrestha	11–5, 11–2, 11–1
Han Hye-song	3–0	Swechchha Nembang	11–1, 11–1, 11–4

13 November	Vietnam	3–0	Uzbekistan

Mai Hoàng Mỹ Trang	3–0	Olga Kim	11–8, 11–6, 11–5
Mai Xuân Hằng	3–0	Indira Kagirova	11–3, 11–7, 13–11
Lương Thị Tám	3–0	Nodira Burkhankhodjaeva	11–8, 11–6, 12–10

13 November	Uzbekistan	0–3	North Korea

Olga Kim	0–3	Kim Hye-song	7–11, 6–11, 2–11
Indira Kagirova	0–3	Kim Jong	4–11, 2–11, 6–11
Nodira Burkhankhodjaeva	0–3	Hyon Ryon-hui	9–11, 5–11, 6–11

13 November	Thailand	3–0	Nepal

Nanthana Komwong	3–0	Renuka Khatri	11–3, 11–6, 11–0
Suthasini Sawettabut	3–0	Nabita Shrestha	11–3, 11–7, 11–5
Pornrat Rupsung	3–0	Swechchha Nembang	11–7, 11–5, 11–2

14 November	North Korea	3–1	Thailand

Kim Jong	3–0	Nanthana Komwong	11–9, 17–15, 11–6
Kim Hye-song	2–3	Suthasini Sawettabut	11–6, 11–7, 8–11, 7–11, 8–11
Han Hye-song	3–1	Anisara Muangsuk	9–11, 11–6, 11–8, 11–8
Kim Jong	3–0	Suthasini Sawettabut	11–5, 11–7, 11–8

14 November	Vietnam	3–0	Nepal

Mai Hoàng Mỹ Trang	3–0	Renuka Khatri	11–3, 11–7, 11–2
Mai Xuân Hằng	3–0	Nabita Shrestha	14–12, 11–9, 11–5
Lương Thị Tám	3–0	Elina Maharjan	11–4, 11–2, 11–6

14 November	Vietnam	1–3	Thailand

Mai Hoàng Mỹ Trang	3–2	Suthasini Sawettabut	8–11, 11–7, 8–11, 11–7, 11–9
Mai Xuân Hằng	0–3	Nanthana Komwong	6–11, 5–11, 7–11
Phạm Thị Thiên Kim	0–3	Anisara Muangsuk	3–11, 2–11, 3–11
Mai Hoàng Mỹ Trang	1–3	Nanthana Komwong	5–11, 8–11, 11–7, 7–11

14 November	Nepal	0–3	Uzbekistan

Nabita Shrestha	1–3	Olga Kim	4–11, 11–7, 3–11, 3–11
Renuka Khatri	1–3	Nodira Burkhankhodjaeva	6–11, 11–6, 10–12, 9–11
Swechchha Nembang	0–3	Indira Kagirova	5–11, 7–11, 7–11

==== Group D ====
Pos	Team	Pld	W	L	MF	MA	Pts	Qualification
1	South Korea	3	3	0	9	2	6	Quarterfinals
2	Hong Kong	3	2	1	8	3	5	Quarterfinals
3	Malaysia	3	1	2	3	6	4	
4	Qatar	3	0	3	0	9	3	

Source: ATTU

13 November	South Korea	3–0	Malaysia

Kim Kyung-ah	3–0	Ng Sock Khim	11–4, 11–3, 11–7
Park Mi-young	3–0	Beh Lee Wei	11–5, 11–1, 11–3
Seok Ha-jung	3–1	Chiu Soo Jiin	4–11, 11–5, 11–9, 11–7

13 November	Hong Kong	3–0	Qatar

Jiang Huajun	3–0	Maha Faramarzi	11–8, 11–4, 11–4
Tie Ya Na	3–0	Aya Majdi	11–1, 11–2, 11–2
Zhang Rui	3–0	Noora Al-Abri	11–3, 11–3, 11–4

13 November	Hong Kong	2–3	South Korea

Tie Ya Na	3–2	Kim Kyung-ah	11–9, 11–7, 8–11, 9–11, 11–5
Jiang Huajun	1–3	Seok Ha-jung	11–9, 7–11, 9–11, 7–11
Zhang Rui	0–3	Park Mi-young	8–11, 8–11, 10–12
Tie Ya Na	3–1	Seok Ha-jung	11–7, 11–8, 7–11, 11–9
Jiang Huajun	1–3	Kim Kyung-ah	8–11, 11–9, 7–11, 9–11

13 November	Qatar	0–3	Malaysia

Aya Majdi	0–3	Ng Sock Khim	2–11, 7–11, 5–11
Maha Faramarzi	0–3	Beh Lee Wei	4–11, 3–11, 7–11
Kholoud Abdulreda	0–3	Chiu Soo Jiin	4–11, 4–11, 4–11

14 November	South Korea	3–0	Qatar

Park Mi-young	3–0	Maha Faramarzi	11–5, 11–4, 11–3
Yang Ha-eun	3–0	Aya Majdi	11–4, 11–6, 11–5
Moon Hyun-jung	3–0	Hissa Al-Hamad	11–4, 11–2, 11–4

14 November	Malaysia	0–3	Hong Kong

Beh Lee Wei	0–3	Jiang Huajun	4–11, 8–11, 9–11
Ng Sock Khim	0–3	Tie Ya Na	6–11, 7–11, 5–11
Chiu Soo Jiin	0–3	Lin Ling	2–11, 1–11, 4–11

=== Knockout round ===
Quarterfinals
A1	China	3
India	0
Thailand	0
D1	South Korea	3
C1	North Korea	3
Hong Kong	1
Japan	2
B1	Singapore	3

Semifinals
A1	China	3
D1	South Korea	1
C1	North Korea	0
B1	Singapore	3

Final
A1	China	3
B1	Singapore	0

==== Quarterfinals ====
14 November	India	0–3	China

Shamini Kumaresan	0–3	Guo Yan	6–11, 7–11, 2–11
Madhurika Patkar	0–3	Li Xiaoxia	7–11, 4–11, 4–11
Mouma Das	0–3	Guo Yue	4–11, 7–11, 9–11

14 November	Thailand	0–3	South Korea

Nanthana Komwong	2–3	Park Mi-young	11–9, 14–12, 7–11, 8–11, 7–11
Anisara Muangsuk	0–3	Kim Kyung-ah	3–11, 9–11, 13–15
Suthasini Sawettabut	2–3	Seok Ha-jung	11–8, 6–11, 9–11, 11–9, 3–11

14 November	Hong Kong	1–3	North Korea

Tie Ya Na	1–3	Kim Hye-song	9–11, 11–4, 4–11, 9–11
Jiang Huajun	2–3	Kim Jong	11–9, 13–11, 9–11, 11–13, 10–12
Lin Ling	3–1	Han Hye-song	8–11, 13–11, 11–8, 11–3
Tie Ya Na	1–3	Kim Jong	9–11, 11–7, 9–11, 9–11

14 November	Singapore	3–2	Japan

Wang Yuegu	1–3	Kasumi Ishikawa	6–11, 9–11, 11–9, 4–11
Feng Tianwei	3–0	Ai Fukuhara	11–5, 11–4, 11–7
Li Jiawei	2–3	Sayaka Hirano	11–8, 7–11, 14–12, 8–11, 6–11
Wang Yuegu	3–1	Ai Fukuhara	13–11, 13–11, 8–11, 11–8
Feng Tianwei	3–2	Kasumi Ishikawa	11–9, 8–11, 1–11, 11–9, 11–7

==== Semifinals ====
15 November	South Korea	1–3	China

Seok Ha-jung	3–2	Liu Shiwen	5–11, 11–7, 4–11, 11–7, 12–10
Park Mi-young	0–3	Li Xiaoxia	8–11, 9–11, 5–11
Kim Kyung-ah	1–3	Guo Yue	7–11, 11–9, 4–11, 8–11
Seok Ha-jung	1–3	Li Xiaoxia	9–11, 11–9, 10–12, 7–11

15 November	North Korea	0–3	Singapore

Kim Jong	1–3	Wang Yuegu	7–11, 9–11, 16–14, 7–11
Kim Hye-song	1–3	Feng Tianwei	5–11, 6–11, 12–10, 10–12
Han Hye-song	1–3	Sun Beibei	9–11, 11–8, 9–11, 8–11

==== Final ====
16 November	China	3–0	Singapore

Li Xiaoxia	3–0	Wang Yuegu	11–8, 15–13, 11–9
Guo Yan	3–0	Feng Tianwei	11–8, 11–6, 11–9
Guo Yue	3–0	Li Jiawei	12–10, 11–7, 11–5

== Non-participating athletes ==
- April Yu (HKG)
- Hiroko Fujii (JPN)
- Misako Wakamiya (JPN)
- Orlathay Santikhonkha (LAO)
- Rabina Deshar (NEP)
- Sin Hye-song (PRK)
- Yu Mengyu (SIN)
- Tidaporn Vongboon (THA)
- Hsu Hui-tsun (TPE)
