= Soft tennis at the 2010 Asian Games – Men's doubles =

Men's doubles at the 2010 Asian Games
- Venue: Tianhe Tennis School
- Dates: 18–19 November 2010
- Competitors: 36 from 9 nations

Medalists
gold medal	Li Chia-hung; Yang Sheng-fa	Chinese Taipei
silver medal	Bae Hwan-sung; Kim Tae-jung	South Korea
bronze medal	Koji Kobayashi; Hidenori Shinohara	Japan
bronze medal	Shigeo Nakahori; Tsuneo Takagawa	Japan

The men's doubles soft tennis event was part of the soft tennis programme and took place between November 18 and 19, at the Tianhe Tennis School.

== Schedule ==
All times are China Standard Time (UTC+08:00)

Date	Time	Event
Thursday, 18 November 2010	10:30	Preliminary round
Thursday, 18 November 2010	15:30	1st round
Thursday, 18 November 2010	16:30	Quarterfinals
Friday, 19 November 2010	10:30	Semifinals
Friday, 19 November 2010	15:30	Final

== Results ==
=== Preliminary round ===
==== Group A ====
Pos	Team	Pld	W	L	GF	GA	GD	Qualification
1	Li Chia-hung (TPE) Yang Sheng-fa (TPE)	2	2	0	10	0	+10	Quarterfinals
2	Navneet Kumar (IND) Atul Sri Patel (IND)	2	1	1	5	6	−1	1st round
3	Sohan Dhauvadel (NEP) Sanjay Nepal (NEP)	2	0	2	1	10	−9	

Source: OCA

	Score		Game								
	Score		1	2	3	4	5	6	7	8	9
Sohan Dhauvadel (NEP); Sanjay Nepal (NEP)	1–5	Navneet Kumar (IND); Atul Sri Patel (IND)	2–4	4–1	2–4	1–4	4–6	4–6			
Li Chia-hung (TPE); Yang Sheng-fa (TPE)	5–0	Navneet Kumar (IND); Atul Sri Patel (IND)	4–0	4–1	4–0	4–0	4–2				
Li Chia-hung (TPE); Yang Sheng-fa (TPE)	5–0	Sohan Dhauvadel (NEP); Sanjay Nepal (NEP)	4–1	4–0	4–1	4–0	4–0				

==== Group B ====
Pos	Team	Pld	W	L	GF	GA	GD	Qualification
1	Koji Kobayashi (JPN) Hidenori Shinohara (JPN)	2	2	0	10	2	+8	1st round
2	Jiao Yang (CHN) Shi Bo (CHN)	2	1	1	7	7	0	1st round
3	Ananda Khamphoumy (LAO) Anandone Khamphoumy (LAO)	2	0	2	2	10	−8	

Source: OCA

	Score		Game								
	Score		1	2	3	4	5	6	7	8	9
Jiao Yang (CHN); Shi Bo (CHN)	5–2	Ananda Khamphoumy (LAO); Anandone Khamphoumy (LAO)	0–4	4–2	4–2	4–1	4–0	1–4	4–2		
Koji Kobayashi (JPN); Hidenori Shinohara (JPN)	5–0	Ananda Khamphoumy (LAO); Anandone Khamphoumy (LAO)	4–0	4–0	4–0	4–0	4–1				
Koji Kobayashi (JPN); Hidenori Shinohara (JPN)	5–2	Jiao Yang (CHN); Shi Bo (CHN)	4–1	4–2	5–3	5–7	4–1	1–4	5–3		

==== Group C ====
Pos	Team	Pld	W	L	GF	GA	GD	Qualification
1	Ji Yong-min (KOR) Lee Yeon (KOR)	2	2	0	10	1	+9	Quarterfinals
2	Lkhagvasürengiin Temüüjin (MGL) Ochirsaikhany Bayasgalant (MGL)	2	1	1	5	5	0	1st round
3	Jopy Mamawal (PHI) Mikoff Manduriao (PHI)	2	0	2	1	10	−9	

Source: OCA

	Score		Game								
	Score		1	2	3	4	5	6	7	8	9
Ji Yong-min (KOR); Lee Yeon (KOR)	5–1	Jopy Mamawal (PHI); Mikoff Manduriao (PHI)	4–1	2–4	4–2	4–0	4–0	4–2			
Lkhagvasürengiin Temüüjin (MGL); Ochirsaikhany Bayasgalant (MGL)	5–0	Jopy Mamawal (PHI); Mikoff Manduriao (PHI)	4–1	4–1	4–1	6–4	4–1				
Lkhagvasürengiin Temüüjin (MGL); Ochirsaikhany Bayasgalant (MGL)	0–5	Ji Yong-min (KOR); Lee Yeon (KOR)	3–5	1–4	1–4	9–11	0–4				

==== Group D ====
Pos	Team	Pld	W	L	GF	GA	GD	Qualification
1	Lin Ting-chun (TPE) Liu Chia-lun (TPE)	2	2	0	10	1	+9	Quarterfinals
2	Gantulgyn Enkhtüvshin (MGL) Radnaabazaryn Bayartogtokh (MGL)	2	1	1	6	9	−3	1st round
3	Jitender Singh Mehlda (IND) Nasir Mohammed (IND)	2	0	2	4	10	−6	

Source: OCA

	Score		Game								
	Score		1	2	3	4	5	6	7	8	9
Lin Ting-chun (TPE); Liu Chia-lun (TPE)	5–0	Jitender Singh Mehlda (IND); Nasir Mohammed (IND)	5–3	4–2	4–0	4–1	4–0				
Gantulgyn Enkhtüvshin (MGL); Radnaabazaryn Bayartogtokh (MGL)	5–4	Jitender Singh Mehlda (IND); Nasir Mohammed (IND)	2–4	4–2	7–5	6–4	2–4	0–4	3–5	4–0	10–8
Gantulgyn Enkhtüvshin (MGL); Radnaabazaryn Bayartogtokh (MGL)	1–5	Lin Ting-chun (TPE); Liu Chia-lun (TPE)	1–4	0–4	4–1	7–9	3–5	0–4			

==== Group E ====
Pos	Team	Pld	W	L	GF	GA	GD	Qualification
1	Bae Hwan-sung (KOR) Kim Tae-jung (KOR)	2	2	0	10	1	+9	1st round
2	Jhomar Arcilla (PHI) Joseph Arcilla (PHI)	2	1	1	6	7	−1	1st round
3	Manoj Subba (NEP) Dushyant Thapa (NEP)	2	0	2	2	10	−8	

Source: OCA

	Score		Game								
	Score		1	2	3	4	5	6	7	8	9
Jhomar Arcilla (PHI); Joseph Arcilla (PHI)	5–2	Manoj Subba (NEP); Dushyant Thapa (NEP)	7–5	7–5	4–2	3–5	7–5	2–4	4–1		
Bae Hwan-sung (KOR); Kim Tae-jung (KOR)	5–0	Manoj Subba (NEP); Dushyant Thapa (NEP)	4–0	4–2	4–0	4–1	4–1				
Bae Hwan-sung (KOR); Kim Tae-jung (KOR)	5–1	Jhomar Arcilla (PHI); Joseph Arcilla (PHI)	4–0	4–2	4–6	4–0	6–4	4–1			

==== Group F ====
Pos	Team	Pld	W	L	GF	GA	GD	Qualification
1	Shigeo Nakahori (JPN) Tsuneo Takagawa (JPN)	2	2	0	10	2	+8	Quarterfinals
2	Chai Jin (CHN) Li Xiang (CHN)	2	1	1	6	5	+1	1st round
3	Donedy Keodalasouk (LAO) Bounthavong Sirisak (LAO)	2	0	2	1	10	−9	

Source: OCA

	Score		Game								
	Score		1	2	3	4	5	6	7	8	9
Chai Jin (CHN); Li Xiang (CHN)	5–0	Donedy Keodalasouk (LAO); Bounthavong Sirisak (LAO)	4–2	4–2	4–1	4–0	4–0				
Shigeo Nakahori (JPN); Tsuneo Takagawa (JPN)	5–1	Donedy Keodalasouk (LAO); Bounthavong Sirisak (LAO)	4–1	4–1	4–2	4–1	2–4	4–2			
Shigeo Nakahori (JPN); Tsuneo Takagawa (JPN)	5–1	Chai Jin (CHN); Li Xiang (CHN)	4–2	4–0	5–7	4–1	4–2	4–0			

=== Knockout round ===
==== Final ====
Final
A1	Li Chia-hung (TPE); Yang Sheng-fa (TPE)	1	4	4	4	2	4	8
E1	Bae Hwan-sung (KOR); Kim Tae-jung (KOR)	4	2	2	0	4	1	6

==== Top half ====
1st round										Quarterfinals										Semifinals
										A1	Li Chia-hung (TPE); Yang Sheng-fa (TPE)	4	7	4	4	4
D2	Gantulgyn Enkhtüvshin (MGL); Radnaabazaryn Bayartogtokh (MGL)	0	2	1	4	5	4	1	1	E2	Jhomar Arcilla (PHI); Joseph Arcilla (PHI)	1	5	0	1	0
E2	Jhomar Arcilla (PHI); Joseph Arcilla (PHI)	4	4	4	2	3	2	4	4											A1	Li Chia-hung (TPE); Yang Sheng-fa (TPE)	4	5	2	2	4	5	5	5
B1	Koji Kobayashi (JPN); Hidenori Shinohara (JPN)	4	4	4	4	4														B1	Koji Kobayashi (JPN); Hidenori Shinohara (JPN)	6	3	4	4	1	3	3	3
F2	Chai Jin (CHN); Li Xiang (CHN)	1	0	0	1	1				B1	Koji Kobayashi (JPN); Hidenori Shinohara (JPN)	4	5	2	4	5	4	3	4
										C1	Ji Yong-min (KOR); Lee Yeon (KOR)	2	3	4	2	7	1	5	2

==== Bottom half ====
1st round							Quarterfinals									Semifinals
							D1	Lin Ting-chun (TPE); Liu Chia-lun (TPE)	2	2	2	2	2
C2	Lkhagvasürengiin Temüüjin (MGL); Ochirsaikhany Bayasgalant (MGL)	4	2	2	1	2	E1	Bae Hwan-sung (KOR); Kim Tae-jung (KOR)	4	4	4	4	4
E1	Bae Hwan-sung (KOR); Kim Tae-jung (KOR)	6	4	4	4	4										E1	Bae Hwan-sung (KOR); Kim Tae-jung (KOR)	5	4	4	5	4
B2	Jiao Yang (CHN); Shi Bo (CHN)	4	5	7	4	5										F1	Shigeo Nakahori (JPN); Tsuneo Takagawa (JPN)	3	1	2	3	1
A2	Navneet Kumar (IND); Atul Sri Patel (IND)	2	3	5	0	3	B2	Jiao Yang (CHN); Shi Bo (CHN)	4	4	0	3	4	2	2
							F1	Shigeo Nakahori (JPN); Tsuneo Takagawa (JPN)	2	6	4	5	2	4	4
