= Soft tennis at the 2010 Asian Games – Men's team =

Men's team at the 2010 Asian Games
- Venue: Tianhe Tennis School
- Dates: 13–14 November 2010
- Competitors: 44 from 9 nations

Medalists
gold medal	Chinese Taipei; Kuo Chia-wei, Li Chia-hung, Lin Ting-chun, Liu Chia-lun, Yang Sheng-fa
silver medal	Japan; Koji Kobayashi, Shigeo Nakahori, Keiya Nakamoto, Hidenori Shinohara, Tsuneo Takagawa
bronze medal	South Korea; Bae Hwan-sung, Ji Yong-min, Kim Tae-jung, Lee Yeon, Lee Yo-han
bronze medal	China; Chai Jin, Chen Mingdong, Jiao Yang, Li Xiang, Shi Bo

The men's team soft tennis event was part of the soft tennis programme and took place between November 13 and 14, at the Tianhe Tennis School.

== Schedule ==
All times are China Standard Time (UTC+08:00)

Date	Time	Event
Saturday, 13 November 2010	09:00	Preliminary round
Sunday, 14 November 2010	09:00	Semifinals
Sunday, 14 November 2010	16:00	Final

== Results ==
=== Preliminary round ===
==== Group A ====
Pos	Team	Pld	W	L	MF	MA	MD	Qualification
1	Japan	3	3	0	8	1	+7	Semifinals
2	China	3	2	1	6	3	+3	Semifinals
3	Mongolia	3	1	2	4	5	−1	
4	Laos	3	0	3	0	9	−9	

Source: OCA

13 November	Mongolia	1–2	China

Lkhagvasürengiin Temüüjin / Gantulgyn Enkhtüvshin	5–4	Chai Jin / Li Xiang	0–4, 2–4, 2–4, 7–5, 4–1, 4–6, 4–1, 8–6, 11–9
Ochirsaikhany Bayasgalant	2–4	Chen Mingdong	3–5, 4–1, 4–6, 6–4, 2–4, 0–4
Radnaabazaryn Bayartogtokh / Altankhuyagiin Damdin	1–5	Jiao Yang / Shi Bo	2–4, 4–0, 5–7, 2–4, 4–6, 2–4

13 November	Japan	3–0	Laos

Shigeo Nakahori / Keiya Nakamoto	5–1	Bounthavong Sirisak / Donedy Keodalasouk	4–0, 4–0, 2–4, 4–1, 4–0, 4–0
Hidenori Shinohara	4–0	Khanthanou Phongsavanh	4–0, 4–1, 4–0, 7–5
Tsuneo Takagawa / Koji Kobayashi	5–0	Ananda Khamphoumy / Anandone Khamphoumy	4–0, 4–1, 4–0, 4–0, 4–2

13 November	Japan	2–1	China

Hidenori Shinohara / Koji Kobayashi	5–2	Jiao Yang / Shi Bo	2–4, 4–1, 4–1, 4–1, 4–6, 4–2, 4–0
Keiya Nakamoto	3–4	Chen Mingdong	2–4, 3–5, 6–4, 5–3, 4–1, 2–4, 7–9
Shigeo Nakahori / Tsuneo Takagawa	5–0	Chai Jin / Li Xiang	4–0, 6–4, 7–5, 4–2, 4–1

13 November	Mongolia	3–0	Laos

Gantulgyn Enkhtüvshin / Radnaabazaryn Bayartogtokh	5–1	Bounthavong Sirisak / Ananda Khamphoumy	4–1, 3–5, 4–2, 5–3, 4–1, 4–1
Ochirsaikhany Bayasgalant	4–2	Anandone Khamphoumy	4–1, 6–4, 3–5, 4–1, 0–4, 4–2
Lkhagvasürengiin Temüüjin / Altankhuyagiin Damdin	5–1	Donedy Keodalasouk / Khanthanou Phongsavanh	4–1, 6–4, 4–2, 2–4, 4–2, 4–2

13 November	China	3–0	Laos

Chai Jin / Li Xiang	5–0	Bounthavong Sirisak / Ananda Khamphoumy	5–3, 4–1, 4–0, 4–2, 4–2
Chen Mingdong	4–1	Anandone Khamphoumy	4–2, 4–2, 4–6, 5–3, 4–0
Jiao Yang / Shi Bo	5–0	Donedy Keodalasouk / Khanthanou Phongsavanh	4–2, 4–0, 4–2, 4–1, 5–3

13 November	Japan	3–0	Mongolia

Hidenori Shinohara / Tsuneo Takagawa	5–4	Lkhagvasürengiin Temüüjin / Gantulgyn Enkhtüvshin	1–4, 4–0, 2–4, 6–4, 4–2, 0–4, 4–1, 1–4, 12–10
Keiya Nakamoto	4–1	Ochirsaikhany Bayasgalant	6–4, 4–0, 2–4, 4–1, 4–2
Shigeo Nakahori / Koji Kobayashi	5–2	Radnaabazaryn Bayartogtokh / Altankhuyagiin Damdin	1–4, 4–2, 1–4, 7–5, 4–2, 4–2, 4–0

==== Group B ====
Pos	Team	Pld	W	L	MF	MA	MD	Qualification
1	Chinese Taipei	4	4	0	10	2	+8	Semifinals
2	South Korea	4	3	1	10	2	+8	Semifinals
3	Philippines	4	2	2	7	5	+2	
4	India	4	1	3	2	10	−8	
5	Nepal	4	0	4	1	11	−10	

Source: OCA

13 November	South Korea	3–0	Nepal

Lee Yeon / Ji Yong-min	5–0	Manoj Subba / Sohan Dhauvadel	4–0, 4–0, 6–4, 4–2, 4–1
Lee Yo-han	4–0	Ashok Singh	4–0, 4–0, 4–0, 5–3
Bae Hwan-sung / Kim Tae-jung	5–0	Sanjay Nepal / Dushyant Thapa	4–1, 4–0, 4–0, 4–0, 4–2

13 November	Philippines	3–0	India

Jhomar Arcilla / Joseph Arcilla	5–1	Jitender Singh Mehlda / Nasir Mohammed	4–0, 4–0, 4–0, 6–8, 4–1, 4–2
Samuel Noguit	4–1	Navneet Kumar	4–2, 3–5, 8–6, 4–1, 4–2
Jopy Mamawal / Mikoff Manduriao	5–0	—	Walkover

13 November	South Korea	3–0	Philippines

Bae Hwan-sung / Kim Tae-jung	5–1	Jopy Mamawal / Mikoff Manduriao	4–1, 4–1, 4–2, 4–1, 3–5, 4–2
Lee Yo-han	4–2	Samuel Noguit	1–4, 4–2, 4–0, 2–4, 7–5, 4–0
Lee Yeon / Ji Yong-min	5–0	Jhomar Arcilla / Joseph Arcilla	5–3, 4–2, 4–2, 4–2, 4–1

13 November	Chinese Taipei	3–0	Nepal

Yang Sheng-fa / Li Chia-hung	5–0	Sohan Dhauvadel / Sanjay Nepal	4–1, 4–2, 4–1, 4–2, 4–1
Kuo Chia-wei	4–0	Ashok Singh	4–1, 4–0, 4–1, 4–0
Lin Ting-chun / Liu Chia-lun	5–0	Dushyant Thapa / Manoj Subba	4–1, 4–0, 4–2, 4–1, 4–1

13 November	Philippines	3–0	Nepal

Jhomar Arcilla / Joseph Arcilla	5–0	Manoj Subba / Sohan Dhauvadel	4–1, 4–1, 5–3, 4–2, 5–3
Samuel Noguit	4–2	Dushyant Thapa	4–0, 2–4, 4–2, 3–5, 4–2, 4–2
Jopy Mamawal / Mikoff Manduriao	5–1	Ashok Singh / Sanjay Nepal	4–0, 6–4, 4–0, 5–3, 2–4, 4–1

13 November	Chinese Taipei	3–0	India

Yang Sheng-fa / Li Chia-hung	5–0	Nasir Mohammed / Jitender Singh Mehlda	4–0, 6–4, 4–1, 4–0, 4–2
Kuo Chia-wei	4–1	Atul Sri Patel	4–1, 3–5, 4–1, 4–1, 4–2
Lin Ting-chun / Liu Chia-lun	5–0	—	Walkover

13 November	Chinese Taipei	2–1	Philippines

Yang Sheng-fa / Li Chia-hung	5–0	Jhomar Arcilla / Joseph Arcilla	4–1, 4–2, 5–3, 4–2, 4–2
Kuo Chia-wei	3–4	Samuel Noguit	5–3, 3–5, 4–2, 3–5, 2–4, 6–4, 5–7
Lin Ting-chun / Liu Chia-lun	5–1	Jopy Mamawal / Mikoff Manduriao	5–3, 4–2, 4–0, 2–4, 7–5, 5–3

13 November	South Korea	3–0	India

Lee Yeon / Ji Yong-min	5–0	Atul Sri Patel / Navneet Kumar	4–1, 4–0, 5–3, 4–1, 4–1
Lee Yo-han	4–0	—	Walkover
Bae Hwan-sung / Kim Tae-jung	5–0	Jitender Singh Mehlda / Nasir Mohammed	4–2, 4–2, 4–2, 4–0, 4–1

13 November	Chinese Taipei	2–1	South Korea

Yang Sheng-fa / Li Chia-hung	5–1	Bae Hwan-sung / Kim Tae-jung	5–3, 7–5, 4–0, 2–4, 5–3, 4–2
Kuo Chia-wei	3–4	Lee Yo-han	0–4, 3–5, 4–1, 1–4, 4–2, 8–6, 6–8
Lin Ting-chun / Liu Chia-lun	5–4	Lee Yeon / Ji Yong-min	4–2, 4–0, 5–3, 3–5, 1–4, 4–1, 3–5, 2–4, 7–4

13 November	India	2–1	Nepal

Jitender Singh Mehlda / Nasir Mohammed	5–0	Ashok Singh / Sanjay Nepal	4–2, 5–3, 4–1, 4–1, 4–1
Atul Sri Patel	4–2	Manoj Subba	4–0, 6–4, 1–4, 4–6, 4–2, 4–2
—	0–5	Sohan Dhauvadel / Dushyant Thapa	Walkover

=== Knockout round ===
Semifinals			Final
A1	Japan	2
B2	South Korea	1	A1	Japan	1
A2	China	0	B1	Chinese Taipei	2
B1	Chinese Taipei	2

==== Semifinals ====
14 November	Japan	2–1	South Korea

Shigeo Nakahori / Tsuneo Takagawa	5–3	Bae Hwan-sung / Kim Tae-jung	4–2, 4–0, 3–5, 3–5, 4–2, 7–5, 2–4, 5–3
Keiya Nakamoto	3–4	Lee Yo-han	2–4, 4–2, 1–4, 7–5, 2–4, 4–1, 6–8
Hidenori Shinohara / Koji Kobayashi	5–4	Lee Yeon / Ji Yong-min	5–3, 4–2, 2–4, 1–4, 2–4, 4–6, 4–1, 6–4, 7–4

14 November	China	0–2	Chinese Taipei

Jiao Yang / Shi Bo	0–5	Yang Sheng-fa / Li Chia-hung	0–4, 1–4, 3–5, 2–4, 1–4
Chen Mingdong	2–4	Kuo Chia-wei	2–4, 4–0, 0–4, 4–1, 0–4, 2–4

==== Final ====
14 November	Japan	1–2	Chinese Taipei

Hidenori Shinohara / Koji Kobayashi	5–2	Yang Sheng-fa / Li Chia-hung	6–4, 7–5, 4–1, 4–6, 3–5, 5–3, 4–1
Keiya Nakamoto	3–4	Kuo Chia-wei	1–4, 4–1, 4–6, 4–2, 5–3, 2–4, 4–7
Shigeo Nakahori / Tsuneo Takagawa	4–5	Lin Ting-chun / Liu Chia-lun	4–2, 7–5, 5–3, 2–4, 1–4, 4–2, 3–5, 2–4, 4–7
