= Soft tennis at the 2010 Asian Games – Women's singles =

Women's singles at the 2010 Asian Games
- Venue: Tianhe Tennis School
- Dates: 16–17 November 2010
- Competitors: 17 from 9 nations

Medalists
gold medal	Zhao Lei	China
silver medal	Kim Ae-kyung	South Korea
bronze medal	Chiang Wan-chi	Chinese Taipei
bronze medal	Kim Kyung-ryun	South Korea

The women's singles soft tennis event was part of the soft tennis programme and took place between November 16 and 17, at the Tianhe Tennis School.

== Schedule ==
All times are China Standard Time (UTC+08:00)

Date	Time	Event
Tuesday, 16 November 2010	09:30	Preliminary round
Tuesday, 16 November 2010	15:30	1st round
Tuesday, 16 November 2010	16:30	Quarterfinals
Wednesday, 17 November 2010	09:30	Semifinals
Wednesday, 17 November 2010	14:00	Final

== Results ==
Legend

- WO — Won by walkover

=== Preliminary round ===
==== Group A ====
Pos	Athlete	Pld	W	L	GF	GA	GD	Qualification
1	Chiang Wan-chi (TPE)	2	2	0	8	0	+8	Quarterfinals
2	Cheryl Macasera (PHI)	2	1	1	4	4	0	1st round
3	Bulgany Norovsüren (MGL)	2	0	2	0	8	−8	

Source: OCA

	Score		Game						
	Score		1	2	3	4	5	6	7
Cheryl Macasera (PHI)	4–0	Bulgany Norovsüren (MGL)	4–1	4–1	4–2	4–2			
Chiang Wan-chi (TPE)	4–0	Bulgany Norovsüren (MGL)	4–1	4–1	4–0	4–1			
Chiang Wan-chi (TPE)	4–0	Cheryl Macasera (PHI)	4–1	4–1	4–1	4–0			

==== Group B ====
Pos	Athlete	Pld	W	L	GF	GA	GD	Qualification
1	Kim Ae-kyung (KOR)	3	3	0	12	2	+10	Quarterfinals
2	Jo Yong-sim (PRK)	3	2	1	9	4	+5	Quarterfinals
3	Samia Rizvi (IND)	3	1	2	1	8	−7	
4	Shabnam Yusupzhanova (TJK)	3	0	3	0	8	−8	

Source: OCA

	Score		Game						
	Score		1	2	3	4	5	6	7
Kim Ae-kyung (KOR)	4–0	Shabnam Yusupzhanova (TJK)	4–0	4–0	4–1	4–1			
Jo Yong-sim (PRK)	4–0	Samia Rizvi (IND)	6–4	4–1	5–3	4–0			
Kim Ae-kyung (KOR)	4–1	Samia Rizvi (IND)	5–3	4–1	2–4	4–0	4–2		
Jo Yong-sim (PRK)	4–0	Shabnam Yusupzhanova (TJK)	4–0	4–0	4–0	4–1			
Samia Rizvi (IND)	WO	Shabnam Yusupzhanova (TJK)							
Kim Ae-kyung (KOR)	4–1	Jo Yong-sim (PRK)	7–5	4–0	7–5	3–5	4–2		

==== Group C ====
Pos	Athlete	Pld	W	L	GF	GA	GD	Qualification
1	Ayaka Oba (JPN)	3	3	0	12	0	+12	Quarterfinals
2	Gao Tong (CHN)	3	2	1	8	4	+4	1st round
3	Dashiin Tsetsenbayar (MGL)	3	1	2	4	11	−7	
4	Taruka Srivastav (IND)	3	0	3	3	12	−9	

Source: OCA

	Score		Game						
	Score		1	2	3	4	5	6	7
Gao Tong (CHN)	4–0	Dashiin Tsetsenbayar (MGL)	4–1	4–0	4–2	4–0			
Ayaka Oba (JPN)	4–0	Taruka Srivastav (IND)	4–0	4–2	4–1	4–2			
Ayaka Oba (JPN)	4–0	Dashiin Tsetsenbayar (MGL)	4–1	4–1	4–1	4–1			
Gao Tong (CHN)	4–0	Taruka Srivastav (IND)	4–1	4–1	4–1	4–2			
Gao Tong (CHN)	0–4	Ayaka Oba (JPN)	2–4	3–5	2–4	2–4			
Taruka Srivastav (IND)	3–4	Dashiin Tsetsenbayar (MGL)	7–5	5–3	4–1	1–4	1–4	2–4	4–7

==== Group D ====
Pos	Athlete	Pld	W	L	GF	GA	GD	Qualification
1	Kim Kyung-ryun (KOR)	2	2	0	8	3	+5	Quarterfinals
2	Eri Uehara (JPN)	2	1	1	5	6	−1	1st round
3	Ri Nam-hui (PRK)	2	0	2	4	8	−4	

Source: OCA

	Score		Game						
	Score		1	2	3	4	5	6	7
Eri Uehara (JPN)	4–2	Ri Nam-hui (PRK)	4–6	4–2	6–4	2–4	4–2	7–5	
Kim Kyung-ryun (KOR)	4–2	Ri Nam-hui (PRK)	8–6	4–2	12–14	3–5	4–0	5–3	
Kim Kyung-ryun (KOR)	4–1	Eri Uehara (JPN)	7–5	4–1	6–4	1–4	4–1		

==== Group E ====
Pos	Athlete	Pld	W	L	GF	GA	GD	Qualification
1	Zhao Lei (CHN)	2	2	0	8	1	+7	Quarterfinals
2	Chang Wen-hsin (TPE)	2	1	1	4	5	−1	1st round
3	Bien Zoleta (PHI)	2	0	2	2	8	−6	

Source: OCA

	Score		Game						
	Score		1	2	3	4	5	6	7
Chang Wen-hsin (TPE)	4–1	Bien Zoleta (PHI)	4–0	1–4	4–2	7–5	4–1		
Zhao Lei (CHN)	4–1	Bien Zoleta (PHI)	4–1	4–1	4–0	2–4	4–0		
Zhao Lei (CHN)	4–0	Chang Wen-hsin (TPE)	4–1	4–1	4–0	4–0			

=== Knockout round ===
==== Final ====
Final
B1	Kim Ae-kyung (KOR)	4	0	2	1	1
E1	Zhao Lei (CHN)	2	4	4	4	4

==== Top half ====
1st round							Quarterfinals								Semifinals
							A1	Chiang Wan-chi (TPE)	1	4	4	3	4	5
E2	Chang Wen-hsin (TPE)	2	3	4	0	6	D2	Eri Uehara (JPN)	4	2	2	5	2	3
D2	Eri Uehara (JPN)	4	5	1	4	8									A1	Chiang Wan-chi (TPE)	4	4	2	1	7	0
															B1	Kim Ae-kyung (KOR)	1	0	4	4	9	4
							B1	Kim Ae-kyung (KOR)	0	4	4	5	4
							C1	Ayaka Oba (JPN)	4	1	2	3	1

==== Bottom half ====
1st round								Quarterfinals							Semifinals
								D1	Kim Kyung-ryun (KOR)	4	4	5	4	4
								B2	Jo Yong-sim (PRK)	1	0	7	0	1
															D1	Kim Kyung-ryun (KOR)	2	1	4	1	4	4	3
C2	Gao Tong (CHN)	6	4	1	2	4	4								E1	Zhao Lei (CHN)	4	4	2	4	0	1	7
A2	Cheryl Macasera (PHI)	4	1	4	4	1	2	C2	Gao Tong (CHN)	1	1	2	0
								E1	Zhao Lei (CHN)	4	4	4	4
