= Soft tennis at the 2010 Asian Games – Women's doubles =

Women's doubles at the 2010 Asian Games
- Venue: Tianhe Tennis School
- Dates: 18–19 November 2010
- Competitors: 32 from 8 nations

Medalists
gold medal	Hitomi Sugimoto; Eri Uehara	Japan
silver medal	Joo Og; Kim Ae-kyung	South Korea
bronze medal	Xin Yani; Zhao Lei	China
bronze medal	Ayaka Oba; Mai Sasaki	Japan

The women's doubles soft tennis event was part of the soft tennis programme and took place between November 18 and 19, at the Tianhe Tennis School.

== Schedule ==
All times are China Standard Time (UTC+08:00)

Date	Time	Event
Thursday, 18 November 2010	09:30	Preliminary round
Thursday, 18 November 2010	15:30	Quarterfinals
Friday, 19 November 2010	09:30	Semifinals
Friday, 19 November 2010	14:00	Final

== Results ==
Legend

- r — Retired

=== Preliminary round ===
==== Group A ====
Pos	Team	Pld	W	L	GF	GA	GD	Qualification
1	Xin Yani (CHN) Zhao Lei (CHN)	3	3	0	15	2	+13	Quarterfinals
2	Ayaka Oba (JPN) Mai Sasaki (JPN)	3	2	1	11	5	+6	Quarterfinals
3	Bulgany Norovsüren (MGL) Dagiidambyn Naranjargal (MGL)	3	1	2	5	13	−8	
4	Priyanka Bugade (IND) Samia Rizvi (IND)	3	0	3	4	15	−11	

Source: OCA

	Score		Game								
	Score		1	2	3	4	5	6	7	8	9
Xin Yani (CHN); Zhao Lei (CHN)	5–0	Bulgany Norovsüren (MGL); Dagiidambyn Naranjargal (MGL)	4–1	4–2	4–0	4–1	5–3				
Ayaka Oba (JPN); Mai Sasaki (JPN)	5–0	Priyanka Bugade (IND); Samia Rizvi (IND)	4–1	4–0	4–0	4–1	4–0				
Ayaka Oba (JPN); Mai Sasaki (JPN)	5–0	Bulgany Norovsüren (MGL); Dagiidambyn Naranjargal (MGL)	4–0	5–3	4–0	4–1	4–1				
Xin Yani (CHN); Zhao Lei (CHN)	5–1	Priyanka Bugade (IND); Samia Rizvi (IND)	4–0	2–4	4–0	4–1	4–0	4–2			
Ayaka Oba (JPN); Mai Sasaki (JPN)	1–5	Xin Yani (CHN); Zhao Lei (CHN)	1–4	0–4	3–5	2–4	4–2	1–4			
Bulgany Norovsüren (MGL); Dagiidambyn Naranjargal (MGL)	5–3	Priyanka Bugade (IND); Samia Rizvi (IND)	2–4	4–0	4–6	4–2	6–4	0–4	4–2	4–2	

==== Group B ====
Pos	Team	Pld	W	L	GF	GA	GD	Qualification
1	Kwon Ran-hee (KOR) Park Soon-joung (KOR)	3	3	0	15	2	+13	Quarterfinals
2	Chang Wen-hsin (TPE) Hang Chia-ling (TPE)	3	2	1	12	9	+3	Quarterfinals
3	Han Yong-mi (PRK) Jon Myong-suk (PRK)	3	1	2	7	14	−7	
4	Divina Escala (PHI) Josephine Paguyo (PHI)	3	0	3	6	15	−9	

Source: OCA

	Score		Game								
	Score		1	2	3	4	5	6	7	8	9
Kwon Ran-hee (KOR); Park Soon-joung (KOR)	5–0	Divina Escala (PHI); Josephine Paguyo (PHI)	4–0	4–1	4–1	4–1	6–4				
Chang Wen-hsin (TPE); Hang Chia-ling (TPE)	5–2	Han Yong-mi (PRK); Jon Myong-suk (PRK)	7–9	5–3	4–2	5–7	4–1	4–0	5–3		
Kwon Ran-hee (KOR); Park Soon-joung (KOR)	5–0	Han Yong-mi (PRK); Jon Myong-suk (PRK)	4–2	4–1	4–0	4–2	4–2				
Chang Wen-hsin (TPE); Hang Chia-ling (TPE)	5–2	Divina Escala (PHI); Josephine Paguyo (PHI)	6–4	2–4	4–6	4–2	5–3	5–3	4–1		
Han Yong-mi (PRK); Jon Myong-suk (PRK)	5–4	Divina Escala (PHI); Josephine Paguyo (PHI)	5–3	0–4	1–4	1–4	4–0	5–3	2–4	4–2	7–1
Kwon Ran-hee (KOR); Park Soon-joung (KOR)	5–2	Chang Wen-hsin (TPE); Hang Chia-ling (TPE)	4–1	1–4	6–4	2–4	4–2	5–3	4–2		

==== Group C ====
Pos	Team	Pld	W	L	GF	GA	GD	Qualification
1	Joo Og (KOR) Kim Ae-kyung (KOR)	3	3	0	15	4	+11	Quarterfinals
2	Gao Tong (CHN) Qiu Sisi (CHN)	3	2	1	14	5	+9	Quarterfinals
3	Monica Menon (IND) Taruka Srivastav (IND)	3	1	2	5	10	−5	
4	Boldyn Namuudari (MGL) Sugaryn Ganchimeg (MGL)	3	0	3	0	15	−15	

Source: OCA

	Score		Game								
	Score		1	2	3	4	5	6	7	8	9
Joo Og (KOR); Kim Ae-kyung (KOR)	5–0	Monica Menon (IND); Taruka Srivastav (IND)	4–1	4–0	4–0	4–1	4–0				
Gao Tong (CHN); Qiu Sisi (CHN)	5–0	Boldyn Namuudari (MGL); Sugaryn Ganchimeg (MGL)	4–0	5–3	4–0	4–1	4–1				
Joo Og (KOR); Kim Ae-kyung (KOR)	5–0	Boldyn Namuudari (MGL); Sugaryn Ganchimeg (MGL)	4–0	4–1	4–0	4–1	4–1				
Gao Tong (CHN); Qiu Sisi (CHN)	5–0	Monica Menon (IND); Taruka Srivastav (IND)	4–0	4–1	4–0	4–0	4–1				
Joo Og (KOR); Kim Ae-kyung (KOR)	5–4	Gao Tong (CHN); Qiu Sisi (CHN)	4–2	3–5	4–0	2–4	3–5	5–3	7–9	5–3	8–6
Boldyn Namuudari (MGL); Sugaryn Ganchimeg (MGL)	0–5	Monica Menon (IND); Taruka Srivastav (IND)	2–4	2–4	2–4	3–5	3–5				

==== Group D ====
Pos	Team	Pld	W	L	GF	GA	GD	Qualification
1	Cheng Chu-ling (TPE) Chu Yun-hsuan (TPE)	3	3	0	15	8	+7	Quarterfinals
2	Hitomi Sugimoto (JPN) Eri Uehara (JPN)	3	2	1	14	7	+7	Quarterfinals
3	Jo Yong-sim (PRK) Ri Nam-hui (PRK)	3	1	2	10	13	−3	
4	Deena Cruz (PHI) Cheryl Macasera (PHI)	3	0	3	4	15	−11	

Source: OCA

	Score		Game								
	Score		1	2	3	4	5	6	7	8	9
Hitomi Sugimoto (JPN); Eri Uehara (JPN)	5–2	Jo Yong-sim (PRK); Ri Nam-hui (PRK)	5–3	4–1	3–5	7–5	4–1	0–4	8–6		
Cheng Chu-ling (TPE); Chu Yun-hsuan (TPE)	5–1	Deena Cruz (PHI); Cheryl Macasera (PHI)	1–4	4–1	5–3	4–0	4–2	5–3			
Hitomi Sugimoto (JPN); Eri Uehara (JPN)	5–0	Deena Cruz (PHI); Cheryl Macasera (PHI)	4–0	4–1	4–2	4–2	4–2				
Cheng Chu-ling (TPE); Chu Yun-hsuan (TPE)	5–3	Jo Yong-sim (PRK); Ri Nam-hui (PRK)	3–5	5–7	4–2	1–4	4–1	4–0	4–1	4–1	
Hitomi Sugimoto (JPN); Eri Uehara (JPN)	4–5	Cheng Chu-ling (TPE); Chu Yun-hsuan (TPE)	2–4	4–1	3–5	4–1	5–3	2–4	1–4	4–1	9–11
Deena Cruz (PHI); Cheryl Macasera (PHI)	3–5	Jo Yong-sim (PRK); Ri Nam-hui (PRK)	7–5	7–5	4–1	3–5	2–4	4–6	2–4	2–4	

=== Knockout round ===
Quarterfinals
A1	Xin Yani (CHN); Zhao Lei (CHN)	4	4	4	1	5
C2	Gao Tong (CHN); Qiu Sisi (CHN)	2	1	2	4	4^{r}
D2	Hitomi Sugimoto (JPN); Eri Uehara (JPN)	5	6	4	4	4
B1	Kwon Ran-hee (KOR); Park Soon-joung (KOR)	3	4	0	1	1
C1	Joo Og (KOR); Kim Ae-kyung (KOR)	4	5	2	4	4	5
B2	Chang Wen-hsin (TPE); Hang Chia-ling (TPE)	0	3	4	2	1	3
A2	Ayaka Oba (JPN); Mai Sasaki (JPN)	2	4	1	2	2	4	4	4	7
D1	Cheng Chu-ling (TPE); Chu Yun-hsuan (TPE)	4	1	4	4	4	1	2	0	4

Semifinals
A1	Xin Yani (CHN); Zhao Lei (CHN)	3	5	5	4	1	0	4
D2	Hitomi Sugimoto (JPN); Eri Uehara (JPN)	5	3	3	6	4	4	6
C1	Joo Og (KOR); Kim Ae-kyung (KOR)	8	4	4	4	4	9
A2	Ayaka Oba (JPN); Mai Sasaki (JPN)	6	6	2	2	2	7

Final
D2	Hitomi Sugimoto (JPN); Eri Uehara (JPN)	4	1	1	1	4	4	4	4
C1	Joo Og (KOR); Kim Ae-kyung (KOR)	2	4	4	4	2	1	1	2
