= Soft tennis at the 2010 Asian Games – Women's team =

Women's team at the 2010 Asian Games
- Venue: Tianhe Tennis School
- Dates: 13–14 November 2010
- Competitors: 39 from 8 nations

Medalists
gold medal	Japan; Kana Morihara, Ayaka Oba, Mai Sasaki, Hitomi Sugimoto, Eri Uehara
silver medal	Chinese Taipei; Chang Wen-hsin, Cheng Chu-ling, Chiang Wan-chi, Chu Yun-hsuan, Hang Chia-ling
bronze medal	South Korea; Joo Og, Kim Ae-kyung, Kim Kyung-ryun, Kwon Ran-hee, Park Soon-joung
bronze medal	China; Gao Tong, Hao Jie, Qiu Sisi, Xin Yani, Zhao Lei

The women's team soft tennis event was part of the soft tennis programme and took place between November 13 and 14, at the Tianhe Tennis School.

== Schedule ==
All times are China Standard Time (UTC+08:00)

Date	Time	Event
Saturday, 13 November 2010	09:00	Preliminary round
Sunday, 14 November 2010	09:00	Semifinals
Sunday, 14 November 2010	14:00	Final

== Results ==
=== Preliminary round ===
==== Group A ====
Pos	Team	Pld	W	L	MF	MA	MD	Qualification
1	South Korea	3	3	0	8	1	+7	Semifinals
2	China	3	2	1	7	2	+5	Semifinals
3	Mongolia	3	1	2	2	7	−5	
4	India	3	0	3	1	8	−7	

Source: OCA

13 November	South Korea	3–0	India

Kwon Ran-hee / Park Soon-joung	5–0	Samia Rizvi / Monica Menon	4–1, 4–1, 4–2, 7–5, 4–2
Kim Kyung-ryun	4–0	Taruka Srivastav	4–2, 4–1, 4–2, 4–0
Kim Ae-kyung / Joo Og	5–0	—	Walkover

13 November	China	3–0	Mongolia

Gao Tong / Qiu Sisi	5–0	Bulgany Norovsüren / Dagiidambyn Naranjargal	4–1, 4–0, 4–1, 4–1, 4–0
Zhao Lei	4–0	Dashiin Tsetsenbayar	4–0, 4–0, 4–0, 4–1
Hao Jie / Xin Yani	5–0	—	Walkover

13 November	China	3–0	India

Gao Tong / Qiu Sisi	5–1	Monica Menon / Taruka Srivastav	4–0, 4–2, 2–4, 4–1, 4–0, 4–1
Zhao Lei	4–0	Samia Rizvi	4–1, 4–2, 4–0, 4–0
Hao Jie / Xin Yani	5–0	—	Walkover

13 November	South Korea	3–0	Mongolia

Kim Ae-kyung / Park Soon-joung	5–0	Dashiin Tsetsenbayar / Dagiidambyn Naranjargal	4–0, 4–0, 4–0, 4–1, 4–1
Kwon Ran-hee	4–0	Bulgany Norovsüren	4–0, 5–3, 4–1, 4–0
Kim Kyung-ryun / Joo Og	5–0	—	Walkover

13 November	South Korea	2–1	China

Kim Ae-kyung / Joo Og	5–0	Gao Tong / Qiu Sisi	4–2, 4–1, 4–0, 4–2, 6–4
Kim Kyung-ryun	2–4	Zhao Lei	3–5, 2–4, 2–4, 4–2, 6–4, 4–6
Kwon Ran-hee / Park Soon-joung	5–4	Hao Jie / Xin Yani	8–6, 5–7, 4–2, 9–7, 2–4, 2–4, 4–0, 3–5, 9–7

13 November	Mongolia	2–1	India

Boldyn Namuudari / Dagiidambyn Naranjargal	3–5	Priyanka Bugade / Monica Menon	1–4, 4–0, 2–4, 2–4, 4–2, 4–6, 6–4, 2–4
Bulgany Norovsüren	4–2	Taruka Srivastav	0–4, 4–2, 4–0, 0–4, 5–3, 4–2
Dashiin Tsetsenbayar / Sugaryn Ganchimeg	5–0	—	Walkover

==== Group B ====
Pos	Team	Pld	W	L	MF	MA	MD	Qualification
1	Japan	3	3	0	8	1	+7	Semifinals
2	Chinese Taipei	3	2	1	7	2	+5	Semifinals
3	North Korea	3	1	2	3	6	−3	
4	Philippines	3	0	3	0	9	−9	

Source: OCA

13 November	Japan	3–0	Philippines

Hitomi Sugimoto / Kana Morihara	5–1	Deena Cruz / Cheryl Macasera	2–4, 4–0, 4–2, 6–4, 4–0, 5–3
Eri Uehara	4–1	Bien Zoleta	4–2, 2–4, 4–1, 4–2, 4–2
Mai Sasaki / Ayaka Oba	5–0	Divina Escala / Josephine Paguyo	4–0, 4–2, 4–0, 4–2, 4–0

13 November	Chinese Taipei	3–0	North Korea

Hang Chia-ling / Chang Wen-hsin	5–1	Ri Nam-hui / Jon Myong-suk	4–2, 4–2, 4–0, 5–3, 2–4, 4–0
Chiang Wan-chi	4–1	Jo Yong-sim	4–0, 4–2, 4–1, 3–5, 4–1
Cheng Chu-ling / Chu Yun-hsuan	5–2	Han Yong-mi / Sim Un-jong	5–3, 2–4, 4–1, 4–2, 0–4, 4–2, 5–3

13 November	Chinese Taipei	3–0	Philippines

Cheng Chu-ling / Chu Yun-hsuan	5–0	Cheryl Macasera / Deena Cruz	4–1, 4–1, 5–3, 4–1, 4–0
Chiang Wan-chi	4–0	Bien Zoleta	4–0, 4–2, 4–1, 4–1
Hang Chia-ling / Chang Wen-hsin	5–1	Divina Escala / Josephine Paguyo	4–1, 4–2, 4–2, 2–4, 5–3, 4–2

13 November	Japan	3–0	North Korea

Hitomi Sugimoto / Eri Uehara	5–0	Ri Nam-hui / Jon Myong-suk	4–1, 5–3, 4–1, 4–2, 4–2
Ayaka Oba	4–1	Jo Yong-sim	8–6, 2–4, 8–6, 5–3, 4–0
Mai Sasaki / Kana Morihara	5–1	Sim Un-jong / Han Yong-mi	4–0, 6–4, 4–0, 3–5, 4–1, 4–0

13 November	Japan	2–1	Chinese Taipei

Hitomi Sugimoto / Kana Morihara	5–3	Hang Chia-ling / Chang Wen-hsin	6–4, 2–4, 3–5, 4–1, 4–2, 2–4, 4–1, 7–5
Eri Uehara	1–4	Chiang Wan-chi	1–4, 4–0, 2–4, 4–6, 1–4
Mai Sasaki / Ayaka Oba	5–1	Cheng Chu-ling / Chu Yun-hsuan	5–3, 4–0, 2–4, 4–0, 4–2, 5–3

13 November	North Korea	3–0	Philippines

Ri Nam-hui / Jon Myong-suk	5–2	Josephine Paguyo / Divina Escala	9–7, 6–4, 2–4, 1–4, 4–1, 4–1, 5–3
Jo Yong-sim	4–2	Bien Zoleta	2–4, 4–2, 4–2, 0–4, 5–3, 4–2
Sim Un-jong / Han Yong-mi	5–2	Cheryl Macasera / Deena Cruz	5–3, 0–4, 4–1, 6–4, 3–5, 4–2, 4–2

=== Knockout round ===
Semifinals			Final
A1	South Korea	0
B2	Chinese Taipei	2	B2	Chinese Taipei	1
A2	China	1	B1	Japan	2
B1	Japan	2

==== Semifinals ====
14 November	South Korea	0–2	Chinese Taipei

Kim Ae-kyung / Joo Og	4–5	Hang Chia-ling / Chang Wen-hsin	4–2, 4–0, 2–4, 4–1, 4–0, 2–4, 3–5, 0–4, 6–8
Kim Kyung-ryun	1–4	Chiang Wan-chi	1–4, 2–4, 4–2, 2–4, 1–4

14 November	China	1–2	Japan

Qiu Sisi / Gao Tong	2–5	Hitomi Sugimoto / Eri Uehara	2–4, 1–4, 2–4, 4–2, 5–3, 5–7, 2–4
Zhao Lei	4–1	Kana Morihara	3–5, 4–0, 4–1, 4–1, 5–3
Hao Jie / Xin Yani	3–5	Mai Sasaki / Ayaka Oba	5–3, 4–2, 2–4, 1–4, 3–5, 5–3, 1–4, 3–5

==== Final ====
14 November	Chinese Taipei	1–2	Japan

Cheng Chu-ling / Chu Yun-hsuan	2–5	Hitomi Sugimoto / Eri Uehara	5–3, 4–2, 0–4, 1–4, 1–4, 4–6, 2–4
Chiang Wan-chi	4–0	Kana Morihara	4–0, 4–2, 4–1, 4–0
Hang Chia-ling / Chang Wen-hsin	2–5	Mai Sasaki / Ayaka Oba	7–9, 4–2, 1–4, 4–2, 2–4, 4–6, 2–4
