= Soft tennis at the 2010 Asian Games – Mixed doubles =

Mixed doubles at the 2010 Asian Games
- Venue: Tianhe Tennis School
- Dates: 15 November 2010
- Competitors: 30 from 8 nations

Medalists
gold medal	Ji Yong-min; Kim Kyung-ryun	South Korea
silver medal	Li Chia-hung; Cheng Chu-ling	Chinese Taipei
bronze medal	Liu Chia-lun; Hang Chia-ling	Chinese Taipei
bronze medal	Kim Tae-jung; Kim Ae-kyung	South Korea

The mixed doubles soft tennis event was part of the soft tennis programme and took place between November 15, at the Tianhe Tennis School.

== Schedule ==
All times are China Standard Time (UTC+08:00)

Date	Time	Event
Monday, 15 November 2010	09:00	1st round
Monday, 15 November 2010	11:00	Quarterfinals
Monday, 15 November 2010	14:00	Semifinals
Monday, 15 November 2010	15:00	Final

== Results ==
=== Final ===
Final
1	Ji Yong-min (KOR); Kim Kyung-ryun (KOR)	6	6	4	4	3	4	4	4
2	Li Chia-hung (TPE); Cheng Chu-ling (TPE)	8	4	1	0	5	0	6	0

=== Top half ===
1st round
Jiao Yang (CHN); Qiu Sisi (CHN)	6	4	4	2	5	4
8	Nasir Mohammed (IND); Taruka Srivastav (IND)	4	2	0	4	3	1
5	Liu Chia-lun (TPE); Hang Chia-ling (TPE)	5	6	4	4	2	4
Altankhuyagiin Damdin (MGL); Sugaryn Ganchimeg (MGL)	3	4	1	2	4	0
Jhomar Arcilla (PHI); Josephine Paguyo (PHI)	1	3	1	2	0
4	Keiya Nakamoto (JPN); Hitomi Sugimoto (JPN)	4	5	4	4	4

Quarterfinals
1	Ji Yong-min (KOR); Kim Kyung-ryun (KOR)	5	1	4	6	0	5	7
Jiao Yang (CHN); Qiu Sisi (CHN)	3	4	0	4	4	3	5
5	Liu Chia-lun (TPE); Hang Chia-ling (TPE)	4	4	2	2	1	5	4	4
4	Keiya Nakamoto (JPN); Hitomi Sugimoto (JPN)	0	2	4	4	4	3	2	2

Semifinals
1	Ji Yong-min (KOR); Kim Kyung-ryun (KOR)	5	4	4	5	4
5	Liu Chia-lun (TPE); Hang Chia-ling (TPE)	3	2	2	3	2

=== Bottom half ===
1st round
3	Kim Tae-jung (KOR); Kim Ae-kyung (KOR)	4	4	4	4	6
Lkhagvasürengiin Temüüjin (MGL); Bulgany Norovsüren (MGL)	0	0	2	2	4
Rahmatullojon Rajabaliev (TJK); Shabnam Yusupzhanova (TJK)	1	1	2	1	0
6	Li Xiang (CHN); Xin Yani (CHN)	4	4	4	4	4
7	Hidenori Shinohara (JPN); Mai Sasaki (JPN)	5	4	5	4	4
Jitender Singh Mehlda (IND); Monica Menon (IND)	3	0	3	1	1
Samuel Noguit (PHI); Bien Zoleta (PHI)	6	1	0	4	6	1	1
2	Li Chia-hung (TPE); Cheng Chu-ling (TPE)	4	4	4	6	4	4	4

Quarterfinals
3	Kim Tae-jung (KOR); Kim Ae-kyung (KOR)	4	4	4	6	4
6	Li Xiang (CHN); Xin Yani (CHN)	2	0	0	4	0
7	Hidenori Shinohara (JPN); Mai Sasaki (JPN)	2	4	4	4	2	0	4	4	0
2	Li Chia-hung (TPE); Cheng Chu-ling (TPE)	4	1	1	6	4	4	2	2	7

Semifinals
3	Kim Tae-jung (KOR); Kim Ae-kyung (KOR)	4	2	2	6	1	4	1	4	7
2	Li Chia-hung (TPE); Cheng Chu-ling (TPE)	0	4	4	4	4	1	4	0	9
