= North Korea at the 2010 Asian Games =

- IOC code: PRK
- NOC: Olympic Committee of the Democratic People's Republic of Korea

in Guangzhou
- Competitors: 188 in 21 sports
- Medals Ranked 12th: Gold 6 Silver 10 Bronze 20 Total 36

Asian Games appearances (overview)
- 1974; 1978; 1982; 1986; 1990; 1994; 1998; 2002; 2006; 2010; 2014; 2018; 2022; 2026

North Korea participated at the 16th Asian Games in Guangzhou, China.

== Medal table ==
Sport	Gold	Silver	Bronze	Total
Shooting	3	4	5	12
Weightlifting	2	3	1	6
Wrestling	1	1	2	4
Judo	0	1	3	4
Football	0	1	0	1
Diving	0	0	2	2
Boxing	0	0	2	2
Table Tennis	0	0	2	2
Athletics	0	0	1	1
Archery	0	0	1	1
Synchronised Swimming	0	0	1	1
Total	6	10	20	36

== Medalists ==
Medal	Name	Sport	Event	Date
Gold	Kim Kum Sok	Weightlifting	Men's 69 kg	15 November
Gold	Kum Chol Pang	Weightlifting	Men's 77 kg	16 November
Gold	Yong Suk Jo	Shooting	Women's 25m Pistol	16 November
Gold	Myong Won Pak	Shooting	Men's 10m Running Target Mixed	17 November
Gold	DPR Korea	Shooting	Men's 10m Running Target Mixed Team	17 November
Gold	Sim Hyang Song	Wrestling	Women's Freestyle 48 kg	25 November
Silver	Cha Kum Chol	Weightlifting	Men's 56 kg	13 November
Silver	Pak Hyon Suk	Weightlifting	Women's 58 kg	15 November
Silver	Kim Un Guk	Weightlifting	Men's 62 kg	14 November
Silver	Sol Kyong	Judo	Women's 70 kg	14 November
Silver	DPR Korea	Football	Women's	22 November
Silver	Jong Su Kim	Shooting	Men's 25m Standard Pistol	17 November
Silver	Yong Chol Jo	Shooting	Men's 10m Running Target	16 November
Silver	DPR Korea	Shooting	Men's 10m Running Target Team	16 November
Silver	DPR Korea	Shooting	Women's Trap Team	19 November
Silver	Kyong Il Yang	Wrestling	Men's Freestyle 55 kg	23 November
Bronze	An Kum Ae	Judo	Women's 52 kg	15 November
Bronze	Kim Su Gyong	Judo	Women's 63 kg	14 November
Bronze	Hong Kuk Hyon	Judo	Men's 66 kg	15 November
Bronze	Jo Yong Suk	Shooting	Women's 10m Air Pistol	14 November
Bronze	Ri Hyang Sim	Shooting	Women's 10m Running Target	15 November
Bronze	DPR Korea	Shooting	Women's 10m Running Target Team	15 November
Bronze	DPR Korea	Shooting	Men's 25m Center Fire Pistol Team	18 November
Bronze	DPR Korea	Shooting	Men's 25m Standard Pistol Team	17 November
Bronze	Jong Chun Mi	Weightlifting	Women's 58 kg	15 November
Bronze	DPR Korea	Table tennis	Women's Team	15 November
Bronze	DPR Korea	Table tennis	Men's Team	15 November
Bronze	Un Sil Kwon	Archery	Women's Individual	23 November
Bronze	Kum Ok Kim	Athletics	Women's Marathon	27 November
Bronze	Myong Son Ri	Boxing	Men's 56kg	26 November
Bronze	Kum Ju Yun	Boxing	Women's 57-60kg	26 November
Bronze	DPR Korea	Diving	Men's Synchronised 10m Platform	22 November
Bronze	DPR Korea	Diving	Women's Synchronised 10m Platform	23 November
Bronze	DPR Korea	Synchronized Swimming	Team	20 November
Bronze	Yon Hui Pak	Wrestling	Women's Freestyle 55 kg	26 November
Bronze	Chun Song Yang	Wrestling	Men's Freestyle 66 kg	24 November

== Archery ==
=== Women ===
Athlete	Event	Ranking Round		Round of 32	Round of 16	Quarterfinals	Semifinals	Final	
Athlete	Event	Score	Seed	Opposition Score	Opposition Score	Opposition Score	Opposition Score	Opposition Score	Rank
Kwon Un-Sil	Individual	1357	3rd Q	Kumarasinghe (SRI) (51); W 4-0	Choe (PRK) (14); W 7-3	Matsushita (JPN) (11); W 6-2	Cheng (CHN) (7); L 1-7	Bronze medal match: Deepika (IND) (5); W 6-2	3rd place, bronze medalist(s)
Choe Song-Hui	Individual	1298	19th Q	Bannova (KAZ) (34); W 4-2	Kwon (PRK) (3); L 3-7	did not advance			
Ri Un-Ok	Individual	1285	26th	did not advance					
Ryu Un-Hyang	Individual	1276	27th	did not advance					
Kwon Un-Sil; Choe Song-Hui; Ryu Un-Hyang	Team	3931	4th		Bangladesh (BAN) (13); W 205-195	India (IND) (5); W 202-214	did not advance		

== Athletics ==
=== Men ===
Road events

Event	Athletes		
Event	Athletes	Final	
Event	Athletes	Result	Rank
Marathon	Pak Song-Chol	2:18:16	6th
Marathon	Ri Hyon-U	2:27:00	11th

=== Women ===
Road events

Event	Athletes		
Event	Athletes	Final	
Event	Athletes	Result	Rank
Marathon	Kim Kum-Ok	2:27:06	3rd place, bronze medalist(s)
Marathon	Jon Kyong-Hui	2:37:22	8th

== Basketball ==
=== Men ===
Team

An Yong Bin
Choe Song Jin
Ho Il
Kim Chang Myong
Kim Un Chol
Kye Kwang U
O Jin Chol
O Jin Hyok
Pak Myong Jin
Pak Un Chol
Ri Kum Song
Sin Kum Byol

Qualifying round

Group A

Team	Pld	W	L	PF	PA	PD	Pts
North Korea	1	1	0	78	71	+7	2
Hong Kong	1	0	1	71	78	−7	1

November 13
19:15

Hong Kong	71–78	North Korea
Scoring by quarter: 21–16, 16–20, 10–20, 24–22
Pts: Liang M.H. 12; Rebs: Fong S.Y. 9 Asts: Wong C.W. 3		Pts: Pak U.C. 19; Rebs: Kye H.U. 13; Asts: Kye H.U. 5

Huangpu Gymnasium, Guangzhou
Referees: Eddie Viator (FRA), Teerapong Yodsint (THA), Ramesh Kumar (IND)

Preliminary round

Group E

Team	Pld	W	L	PF	PA	PD	Pts
China	5	5	0	462	258	+204	10
South Korea	5	4	1	475	311	+164	9
Jordan	5	3	2	339	403	−64	8
North Korea	5	2	3	377	421	−44	7
Mongolia	5	1	4	310	438	−128	6
Uzbekistan	5	0	5	283	415	−132	5

November 16
21:30

Jordan	90–80	North Korea
Scoring by quarter: 24–26, 23–13, 19–13, 24–28
Pts: Abu-Qoura 25; Rebs: Abu-Qoura 10; Asts: Abu-Qoura 3		Pts: Pak M.J. 27; Rebs: Kim U.C. 8 Asts: Pak U.C. 4

International Sports Arena, Guangzhou
Referees: Yasser Abbas (QAT), Prakash Sandou (IND), Naohiko Uchihara (JPN)

November 17
19:15

North Korea	62–98	China
Scoring by quarter: 23–14, 26–14, 19–18, 22–22
Pts: Pak U.C. 19; Rebs: Sin K.B. 8 Asts: O J.H., An Y.B., Sin K.B. 2		Pts: Wang Z.Z. 14; Rebs: Li X.X. 9 Asts: Zhang B. 5

International Sports Arena, Guangzhou
Referees: Borys Shulga (UKR), Wu Ying-wei (TPE), Prakash Sandou (IND)

November 19
21:30

North Korea	66–96	South Korea
Scoring by quarter: 12–27, 18–28, 15–25, 21–16
Pts: Pak U.C. 20; Rebs: Pak U.C., Kim U.C. 3 Asts: Pak U.C. 4		Pts: Cho S.M. 15; Rebs: Lee S.J. 7 Asts: Yang H.J., Kim S.C. 3

International Sports Arena, Guangzhou
Referees: Pablo Estevez (ARG), Wu Ying-wei (TPE), Amir Hossein Safarzadeh (IRI)

November 21
19:15

Mongolia	67–88	North Korea
Scoring by quarter: 18–24, 16–12, 15–24, 18–28
Pts: Sanchir 15; Rebs: Uuganbayar, Sedbazar 9 Asts: Battur 2		Pts: Pak M.J. 23; Rebs: Kye H.U. 7 Asts: Pak M.J. 5

Ying Dong Gymnasium, Guangzhou
Referees: Borys Shulga (UKR), Yasser Abbas (QAT), Ramesh Kumar (IND)

November 22
19:15

North Korea	81–70	Uzbekistan
Scoring by quarter: 17–11, 19–20, 14–9, 31–30
Pts: Pak U.C. 21; Rebs: Kim U.C. 7 Asts: Sin K.B. 5		Pts: Juginisov 25; Rebs: Nuraliev 10; Asts: Nuraliev, Denisov, Pereverzev 2

Ying Dong Gymnasium, Guangzhou
Referees: Fong Kin Lung (HKG), Wu Ying-wei (TPE), Teerapong Yodsint (THA)

Quarterfinals

November 24
15:30

Japan	92–75	North Korea
Scoring by quarter: 24–16, 26–14, 18–17, 24–28
Pts: Ishizaki, Kinoshita 16; Rebs: K. Takeuchi 9 Asts: Sakurai, Ishizaki 3		Pts: Sin K.B. 22; Rebs: Pak M.J., Sin K.B., Kye H.U. 6 Asts: Kim U.C. 4

Huangpu Gymnasium, Guangzhou
Referees: Eddie Viator (FRA), Ravshan Ganiev (UZB), Yang Maogong (CHN)

Placings 5th–8th

November 25
14:15

Philippines	96–69	North Korea
Scoring by quarter: 28–22, 26–15, 22–18, 20–14
Pts: Slaughter, Baracael 18; Rebs: Slaughter 13; Asts: Lutz 6		Pts: Pak M.J. 17; Rebs: Sin K.B., Kim U.C. 6 Asts: Kye H.U. 5

Ying Dong Gymnasium, Guangzhou
Referees: Lau Cheuk Fai (HKG), Amir Hossein Safarzadeh (IRI), Prakash Sandou (IND)

Placings 7th–8th

November 26
14:15

North Korea	74–79	Jordan
Scoring by quarter: 19–23, 7–20, 29–14, 19–22
Pts: Sin K.B. 18; Rebs: Pak U.C. 6 Asts: Kye H.U. 7		Pts: Abu-Qoura 20; Rebs: Abu-Qoura 13; Asts: Al-Sharif, Abu-Qoura 4

Ying Dong Gymnasium, Guangzhou
Referees: Ferdinand Pascual (PHI), Fong Kin Lung (HKG), Song Yanping (CHN)

== Board games ==
Weiqi

Athlete	Event	Win	Lost	Points	Rank	Semifinals		Finals	
Athlete	Event	Win	Lost	Points	Rank	Opposition	Result	Opposition	Result
Pak Ho-Gil; Jo Sae-Byol	Mixed Doubles	3	3	6	8th	did not advance			
Ri Kwang-Hyok; Kim Yu-Mi	Mixed Doubles	3	3	6	11th	did not advance			
Hwang Kyong-Ju; Jo Sae-Byol; Kim Yu-Mi	Women's Team	4	3	8	5th	did not advance			

== Boxing ==
Athlete	Event	Round of 32	Round of 16	Quarterfinals	Semifinals	Final	
Athlete	Event	Opposition Result	Opposition Result	Opposition Result	Opposition Result	Opposition Result	Rank
Sung Song-Guk	Men's Light flyweight	BYE	Tennakoon (SRI); W 15-2	Ruenroeng (THA); L 3-12	did not advance		
Pak Jong-Chol	Men's Flyweight	Chanthasone (LAO); W 4-0	Al-Wadi (JOR); W 10-2	Chang (CHN); L 5-9	did not advance		
Ri Myong-Son	Men's Bantamweight	BYE	Sadeq (QAT); W 5-1	Shimizu (JPN); W 16-13	Zhang (CHN); L RSC R2 2:49	Did not advance	3rd place, bronze medalist(s)
Kim Chol-Song	Men's Lightweight	BYE	Abdulla (MGL); W 7-5	Yadav (IND); L 2-4	did not advance		
Kim Hye-Song	Women's Flyweight		Laopeam (THA); W 8-4	Albania (PHI); L 2-7	did not advance		
Yun Kum-Ju	Women's Lightweight		BYE	Ngo (VIE); W 10-1	Dong (CHN); L 2-7	Did not advance	3rd place, bronze medalist(s)

== Canoeing ==
=== Canoe-Kayak Flatwater ===
Men

Athlete	Event	Heats		Semifinals		Final	
Athlete	Event	Time	Rank	Time	Rank	Time	Rank
Pak Kyong-Chol	K-1 200 m	41.030	5th QS	40.026	3rd QF	39.813	8th
Pak Kyong-Chol; Ham Jun-Song	K-2 200 m	37.725	5th QS	41.308	6th	did not advance	

Women

Athlete	Event	Heats		Semifinals		Final	
Athlete	Event	Time	Rank	Time	Rank	Time	Rank
Jang Ok-Gyong	K-1 200 m	50.198	6th QS	47.875	4th	did not advance	
Hwang Hyon-Ok; Jang Ok-Gyong	K-2 500 m	1:57.091	4th QS	1:58.259	3rd QF	1:58.224	9th

== Diving ==
Men

Athlete	Events	Preliminary		Final	
Athlete	Events	Points	Rank	Points	Rank
Kim Chon-Man	Men's 10 m Individual Platform	445.65	4th	459.40	4th
Kim Chon-Man; So Myong-Hyok	Men's 10 m Synchronised Platform			394.08	3rd place, bronze medalist(s)

Women

Athlete	Events	Preliminary		Final	
Athlete	Events	Points	Rank	Points	Rank
Kim Jin-Ok	Women's 10 m Individual Platform	332.35	4th	336.95	4th
Kim Jin-Ok; Kim Un-Hyang	Women's 10 m Synchronised Platform			284.64	3rd place, bronze medalist(s)

== Football ==
=== North Korea ===
No.	Pos.	Player	Date of birth (age)	Caps	Club
	FW	An Chol-Hyok	June 27, 1987 (aged 23)		(North Korea) Rimyongsu
	FW	Choe Kum-Chol	February 9, 1987 (aged 23)		(North Korea) Rimyongsu
	MF	Choe Myong-Ho	July 3, 1988 (aged 22)		(North Korea) Pyongyang City
	DF	Jon Kwang-Ik	April 5, 1988 (aged 22)		(North Korea) Amrokgang
		Ju Kwang-Min	May 20, 1990 (aged 20)		
	MF	Kim Kuk-Jin	January 5, 1989 (aged 21)		(Switzerland) FC Wil
	FW	Kim Kum-Il	October 10, 1987 (aged 23)		(North Korea) April 25
	MF	Kim Yong-Jun*	July 19, 1983 (aged 27)		(North Korea) Pyongyang City
		Park Chol-Min	December 10, 1988 (aged 21)		
		Park Kwang-Ryong	September 27, 1992 (aged 18)		
	DF	Pak Nam-Chol	October 3, 1988 (aged 22)		(North Korea) Amrokgang
	MF	Pak Nam-Chol*	July 2, 1985 (aged 25)		(North Korea) April 25
		Park Song-Chol	September 24, 1987 (aged 23)		
		Park Yong-Jin	January 29, 1989 (aged 21)		
	MF	Ri Chol-Myong	February 18, 1988 (aged 22)		(North Korea) Pyongyang City
	DF	Ri Jun-Il	August 24, 1987 (aged 23)		(North Korea) Sobaeksu
	DF	Ri Kwang-Chon*	September 4, 1985 (aged 25)		(North Korea) April 25
	DF	Ri Kwang-Hyok	August 17, 1987 (aged 23)		(North Korea) Kyonggongop
		Ri Kwang-Il	April 13, 1994 (aged 16)		
		Yun Yong-Il	July 31, 1988 (aged 22)		

==== Group C ====
Pos	Team	Pld	W	D	L	GF	GA	GD	Pts
1	North Korea	3	3	0	0	7	0	+7	9
2	South Korea	3	2	0	1	7	1	+6	6
3	Palestine	3	0	1	2	0	6	−6	1
4	Jordan	3	0	1	2	0	7	−7	1

Source: RSSSF
November 8
16:00

South Korea	0 – 1	North Korea
	Report	Ri Kwang-Chon 36'

Yuexiushan Stadium, Guangzhou
Referee: Ben Williams (Australia)

November 10
19:00

Palestine	0 – 3	North Korea
	Report	Kim Kuk-Jin 8'; Choe Kum-Chol 28'; Pak Kwang-Ryong 67'

Yingdong Stadium, Guangzhou
Referee: Tan Hai (China)

November 13
16:00

Jordan	0 – 3	North Korea
	Report	Kim Yong-Jun 17'; Choe Myong-Ho 81' (pen.); Choe Kum-Chol 85'

Yingdong Stadium, Guangzhou
Referee: Valentin Kovalenko (Uzbekistan)

1/8 finals

November 16
15:30

North Korea	2 – 0	Vietnam
Choe Kum-Chol 35'; Choe Myong-Ho 90+1' (pen.)	Report

Yuexiushan Stadium, Guangzhou
Referee: Kadhum Auda (Iraq)

Quarter-finals

November 19
16:00

United Arab Emirates	0 – 0 (a.e.t.)	North Korea
	Report
Penalties
Al-Kamali (penalty scored); A. Abdulrahman (penalty scored); Al-Ameri (penalty scored); Saleh (penalty scored); O. Abdulrahman (penalty scored); Mousa (penalty scored); Ali (penalty scored); Jamal (penalty scored); Al-Shehhi (penalty scored)	9 – 8	(penalty scored) Choe Myong-Ho; (penalty scored) Choe Kum-Chol; (penalty scored) Pak Nam-Chol; (penalty scored) An Chol-Hyok; (penalty scored) Jon Kwang-Ik; (penalty scored) Ri Kwang-Hyok; (penalty scored) Kim Kuk-Jin; (penalty scored) Pak Chol-Min; (penalty missed) Ri Chol-Myong

Yuexiushan Stadium, Guangzhou
Referee: Saeid Mozaffarizadeh (Iran)

=== Women ===
Hong Myong-Hui
Kim Kyong-Hwa
Choe Yong-Sim
Song Jong-Sun
Ro Chol-Ok
Ho Un-Byol
Jo Yun-Mi
Ri Ye-Gyong
Kim Yong-Ae
Ra Un-Sim
Ri Un-Gyong
Kim Chung-Sim
Yun Hyon-Hi
Yu Jong-Hui
Jon Myong-Hwa
Jo Yun-Mi
Jong Pok-Sim
Kong Hye-Ok

Group B

Pos	Team	Pld	W	D	L	GF	GA	GD	Pts
1	Japan	2	1	1	0	4	0	+4	4
2	North Korea	2	1	1	0	2	0	+2	4
3	Thailand	2	0	0	2	0	6	−6	0

Source: RSSSF
November 16
19:00

Thailand	0 – 2	North Korea
	Report	Jong Pok-Sim 34' (pen.); Ra Un-Sim 58'

Huangpu Sports Center, Guangzhou
Referee: Mai Hoang Trang (Vietnam)

November 18
16:00

Japan	0 – 0	North Korea
	Report

University City Stadium, Guangzhou
Referee: Wang Jia (China)

Semi-finals

November 20
19:00

South Korea	1 – 3 (a.e.t.)	North Korea
Yoo Young-A 88'	Report	Jo Yun-Mi 45+1'; Ra Un-Sim 94', 119'

Tianhe Stadium, Guangzhou
Referee: Jacqui Melksham (Australia)

Final

November 22
19:00

North Korea	0 – 1	Japan
	Report	Iwashimizu 73'

Tianhe Stadium, Guangzhou
Referee: Pannipar Kamnueng (Thailand)

== Handball ==
=== Women ===
Han Jong-Hyang
Han Sol-Gyong
Jong Yun-Mi
Kang Un-Hui
Kil Mi-Hyang
Kim Chun-Yong
Kim Un-Ok
Kwak Sun-Ok
Mun Un-Suk
O Kyong-Sun
Pak Yong-Mi
Ri Hye-Song
Ro Myong-A
Yang Un-Gyong
Yang Un-Sil

Preliminary round

Group B

Pos	Team	Pld	W	D	L	GF	GA	GD	Pts	Qualification
1	China	3	3	0	0	94	49	+45	6	Semifinals
2	Japan	3	2	0	1	82	68	+14	4	Semifinals
3	North Korea	3	1	0	2	90	74	+16	2	Placement 5th–6th
4	India	3	0	0	3	42	117	−75	0	Placement 7th–8th

Source: Results

November 19; 17:15	Japan	31 – 27	North Korea	Guanggong Gymnasium, Guangzhou; Referees: Al-Mutawa, Al-Suwailam (KUW)
November 19; 17:15	Fujii 10	(14–14)	Kwak S.O. 7	Guanggong Gymnasium, Guangzhou; Referees: Al-Mutawa, Al-Suwailam (KUW)
November 19; 17:15	3× (yellow card) 3× (suspension)	Report	3× (yellow card) 3× (suspension)	Guanggong Gymnasium, Guangzhou; Referees: Al-Mutawa, Al-Suwailam (KUW)

November 21; 20:45	China	26 – 21	North Korea	Guanggong Gymnasium, Guangzhou; Referees: Karbaschi, Kolahdouzan (IRI)
November 21; 20:45	Wei Q.X., Sha Z.W. 6	(10–8)	Jong Y.M. 5	Guanggong Gymnasium, Guangzhou; Referees: Karbaschi, Kolahdouzan (IRI)
November 21; 20:45	3× (yellow card) 6× (suspension)	Report	4× (yellow card) 5× (suspension)	Guanggong Gymnasium, Guangzhou; Referees: Karbaschi, Kolahdouzan (IRI)

November 22; 20:45	India	17 – 42	North Korea	Guanggong Gymnasium, Guangzhou; Referees: Liu, Liu (CHN)
November 22; 20:45	Lakshmi 4	(8–23)	Pak Y.M. 8	Guanggong Gymnasium, Guangzhou; Referees: Liu, Liu (CHN)
November 22; 20:45	3× (yellow card) 2× (suspension)	Report	3× (yellow card) 5× (suspension)	Guanggong Gymnasium, Guangzhou; Referees: Liu, Liu (CHN)

Placement 5th–6th

November 25; 20:15	Chinese Taipei	17 – 38	North Korea	Guanggong Gymnasium, Guangzhou; Referees: Fukushima, Ienaga (JPN)
November 25; 20:15	Chu C.E. 4	(7–23)	Kwak S.O., Yang U.G. 9	Guanggong Gymnasium, Guangzhou; Referees: Fukushima, Ienaga (JPN)
November 25; 20:15	3× (yellow card) 2× (suspension)	Report	3× (yellow card) 3× (suspension)	Guanggong Gymnasium, Guangzhou; Referees: Fukushima, Ienaga (JPN)

== Judo ==
=== Men ===
Athlete	Event	Round of 32	Round of 16	Quarterfinals	Final of table	Final
Athlete	Event	Opposition Result	Opposition Result	Opposition Result	Opposition Result	Opposition Result
Kim Kyong-Jin	Men's -60 kg	Choi Min-Ho (KOR); L 001-011	Did not advance			
Hong Kuk-Hyon	Men's -66 kg	Waleed Al-Kabzari (YEM); W 100-000	Arslan Nurmuhammedov (TKM); W 100-000	Junpei Morishita (JPN); L 000-101	Final Repechage match: Arash Miresmaeili (IRI); W 120-001	Bronze medal match: Islam Baialinov (KGZ); W 001-000 (bronze)
Kim Chol-Su	Men's -73 kg	Achilleus Ralli (THA); W 001-000	BYE	Guvanch Nurmuhammedov (TKM); W 100-000	Wang Ki-Chun (KOR); L 000-100	Bronze medal match: Rasul Boqiev (TJK); L 000-001

=== Women ===
Athlete	Event	Round of 32	Round of 16	Quarterfinals	Final of table	Final
Athlete	Event	Opposition Result	Opposition Result	Opposition Result	Opposition Result	Opposition Result
Hwang Ryu-Ok	Women's -48 kg		Saliha Masoud (QAT); W 100-000	Tomoko Fukumi (JPN); L 000-100	Final Repechage match: Văn Ngọc Tú (VIE); W 001-000	Bronze medal match: Chung Jung-Yeon (KOR); L 000-100
An Kum-Ae	Women's -52 kg		Gulbadam Babamuratova (TKM); W 120-000	Kim Kyung-Ok (KOR); W 101-000	Misato Nakamura (JPN); L Hantei	Bronze medal match: Rima Berdygulova (UZB); W 101-000 (bronze)
Rim Yun-Hui	Women's -57 kg	BYE	Zuhra Madraimova (TKM); W 120-000	Zhu Guirong (CHN); W 101-000	Kaori Matsumoto (JPN); L 000-001	Bronze medal match: Lien Chen-ling (TPE); L 000-100
Kim Su-Gyong	Women's -63 kg		BYE	Selengegiin Enkhzaya (MGL); W 011-010	Yoshie Ueno (JPN); L Hantei	Bronze medal match: Lin Meiling (CHN); W 100-000 (bronze)
Sol Kyong	Women's -70 kg		Fouzia Mumtaz (PAK); W 100-000	Mina Watanabe (JPN); W 100-001	Marian Urdabayeva (KAZ); W 002-001	Hwang Ye-Sul (KOR); L 000-100 (silver)
Sol Kyong	Women's Open		Fouzia Mumtaz (PAK); W 100-000	Dorjgotovyn Tserenkhand (MGL); L 000-100	Final Repechage match: Megumi Tachimoto (JPN); L 000-100	Did not advance

== Karate ==
=== Men ===
Athlete	Event	Round of 32	Round of 16	Quarterfinals	Final of table	Final
Athlete	Event	Opposition Result	Opposition Result	Opposition Result	Opposition Result	Opposition Result
Kang Song-Ji	Kumite -67 kg	BYE	Rinat Sagandykov (KAZ); L 2-6	Repechage 1 match: Mukhammadzaid Iminov (UZB); W WO	Repechage 2 match: Sufian Al-Malayeen (JOR); L 0-2	did not advance

=== Women ===
Athlete	Event	Round of 16	Quarterfinals	Final of table	Final
Athlete	Event	Opposition Result	Opposition Result	Opposition Result	Opposition Result
Kang Ji-Ui	Kumite -50 kg	Chen Yen-hui (TPE); L 1-4	did not advance		

== Rowing ==
Men

Athlete	Event	Heats		Repechage		Final	
Athlete	Event	Time	Rank	Time	Rank	Time	Rank
Kim Chung-Il; Kim Myong-Il; Kim Myong-Nam; Kim Yong-Hun	Lightweight Coxless Four	6:25.50	5th QF	auto advancement		6:25.12	5th

Women

Athlete	Event	Heats		Repechage		Final	
Athlete	Event	Time	Rank	Time	Rank	Time	Rank
Han Kum-Hui; Jang Myong-Hwa; Kim Ryon-Ok; Sin Hyang-Suk	Coxless Four	7:14.29	6th QF	auto advancement		7:08.78	4th
Kim Kyong-A	Lightweight Single Scull	7:57.36	3rd R	7:58.78	5th	did not advance	
Kim Un-Sil; Ri Sol-Gyong	Lightweight Double Scull	7:32.19	4th R	DNS		did not advance	

== Shooting ==
Men

Event	Athlete	Qualification		Final	
Event	Athlete	Score	Rank	Score	Rank
Men's 10 m air pistol	Kim Jong-Su	581-25x	3rd	679.6	4th
Men's 10 m air pistol	Ryu Myong-Yon	577-21x	12th	did not advance	
Men's 10 m air pistol	Kwon Tong-Hyok	DSQ		did not advance	
Men's 10 m air pistol team	Kim Jong-Su; Ryu Myong-Yon; Kwon Tong-Hyok			DSQ	
Men's 25 m standard pistol	Kim Jong-Su			573-14x	2nd place, silver medalist(s)
Men's 25 m standard pistol	Kim Chol-Rim			560-12x	15th
Men's 25 m standard pistol	Ryu Myong-Yon			557-11x	18th
Men's 25 m standard pistol team	Kim Jong-Su; Kim Chol-Rim; Ryu Myong-Yon			1690-37x	3rd place, bronze medalist(s)
Men's 25 m center fire pistol	Kim Jong-Su			582-19x	4th
Men's 25 m center fire pistol	Ryu Myong-Yon			577-12x	18th
Men's 25 m center fire pistol	Kim Chol-Rim			575-17x	17th
Men's 25 m center fire pistol team	Kim Jong-Su; Kim Chol-Rim; Ryu Myong-Yon			1734-48x	1st place, gold medalist(s)
Men's 50 m pistol	Kim Jong-Su	552-14x	13th	did not advance	
Men's 50 m pistol	Ryu Myong-Yon	546- 6x	19th	did not advance	
Men's 50 m pistol	Kwon Tong-Hyok	538- 5x	32nd	did not advance	
Men's 50 m pistol team	Kim Jong-Su; Kwon Tong-Hyok; Ryu Myong-Yon			1636-25x	7th
Men's 10 m running target	Jo Yong-Chol			572-19x	2nd place, silver medalist(s)
Men's 10 m running target	Pak Myong-Won			568- 6x	6th
Men's 10 m running target	Kim Ji-Song			558-10x	10th
Men's 10 m running target team	Jo Yong-Chol; Pak Myong-Won; Kim Ji-Song			1698-25x	2nd place, silver medalist(s)
Men's 10 m running target mixed	Pak Myong-Won			384-13x	1st place, gold medalist(s)
Men's 10 m running target mixed	Jo Yong-Chol			380-13x	4th
Men's 10 m running target mixed	Kim Ji-Song			377- 6x	7th
Men's 10 m running target mixed team	Jo Yong-Chol; Pak Myong-Won; Kim Ji-Song			1141-32x	1st place, gold medalist(s)

Women

Event	Athlete	Qualification		Final	
Event	Athlete	Score	Rank	Score	Rank
Women's 10 m air pistol	Jo Yong-Suk	382- 6x	7th	480.2	3rd place, bronze medalist(s)
Women's 10 m air pistol	Kim Hyang-Gum	379-11x	12th	did not advance	
Women's 10 m air pistol	Ri Hyang-Sun	377-11x	19th	did not advance	
Women's 10 m air pistol team	Jo Yong-Suk; Kim Hyang-Gum; Ri Hyang-Sun			1138-28x	5th
Women's 25 m pistol	Jo Yong-Suk	585-18x	2nd	785.9	1st place, gold medalist(s)
Women's 25 m pistol	Ri Hyang-Sun	574-14x	19th	did not advance	
Women's 25 m pistol	Kim Hyang-Gum	558-15x	34th	did not advance	
Women's 25 m pistol team	Jo Yong-Suk; Kim Hyang-Gum; Ri Hyang-Sun			1717-47x	6th
Women's 10 m running target	*Ri Hyang-Sim			374- 9x	3rd place, bronze medalist(s)
Women's 10 m running target	Jo Hyang			355- 6x	9th
Women's 10 m running target	Pak Hyon-A			339- 3x	16th
Women's 10 m running target team	Ri Hyang-Sim; Jo Hyang; Pak Hyon-A			1068-18x	3rd place, bronze medalist(s)
Women's Trap	Chae Hye-Gyong	68	2nd	82	4th
Women's Trap	Pak Yong-Hui	63	10th	did not advance	
Women's Trap	Yang So-Li	60	15th	did not advance	
Women's Trap team	Chae Hye-Gyong; Chae Hye-Gyong; Yang So-Li			191	2nd place, silver medalist(s)
Women's Skeet	Kim Hyang-Sun	64	9th	did not advance	
Women's Skeet	Pak Kum-Hui	62	13th	did not advance	
Women's Skeet	Kim Un-Hye	46	19th	did not advance	
Women's Skeet team	Kim Hyang-Sun; Pak Kum-Hui; Kim Un-Hye			172	5th

- Ri Hyang-Sim was awarded bronze because of no three-medal sweep per country rule.

== Soft Tennis ==
Athlete	Event	Round Group			1st Round	Quarterfinals	Semifinals	Final
Athlete	Event	Match 1	Match 2	Match 3	1st Round	Quarterfinals	Semifinals	Final
Athlete	Event	Opposition Result	Opposition Result	Opposition Result	Opposition Result	Opposition Result	Opposition Result	Opposition Result
Jo Yong-Sim	Women's Singles	Samia Rizvi (IND); W 4-0 (6-4, 4-1, 5-3, 4-0)	Shabnam Yusupzhanova (TJK); W 4-0 (4-0, 4-0, 4-0, 4-1)	Kim Ae-Kyung (KOR); L 1-4 (5-7, 0-4, 5-7,5-3, 2-4)	BYE	Kim Kyung-Ryun (KOR); L 1-4 (1-4, 0-4, 7-5, 0-4, 1-4)	did not advance	
Ri Nam-Hui	Women's Singles	Eri Uehara (JPN); L 2-4 (6-4, 2-4, 6-4, 4-2, 2-4, 5-7)	Kim Kyung-Ryun (KOR); L 2-4 (6-8, 2-4, 14-12, 5-3, 0-4, 3-5)		did not advance			
Han Yong-Mi; Jon Myong-Suk	Women's Doubles	Chang Wen-hsin (TPE) and Hang Chia-ling (TPE); L 2-5 (9-7, 3-5, 2-4, 7-5, 1-4, 0-4, 3-5)	Kwon Ran-Hee (KOR) and Park Soon-Joung (KOR); L 0-5 (2-4, 1-4, 0-4, 2-4, 2-4)	Divina Escala (PHI) and Josephine Paguyo (PHI); W 5-4 (5-3, 0-4, 1-4, 1-4, 4-0, 5-3, 2-4, 4-2, 7-1)		did not advance		
Jo Yong-Sim; Ri Nam-Hui	Women's Doubles	Hitomi Sugimoto (JPN) and Eri Uehara (JPN); L 2-5 (3-5, 1-4, 5-3, 5-7, 1-4, 4-0, 6-8)	Cheng Chu-ling (TPE) and Chu Yun-hsuan (TPE); L 3-5 (5-3, 5-7, 2-4, 4-1, 1-4, 0-4, 1-4, 1-4)	Deena Cruz (PHI) and Cheryl Macasera (PHI); W 5-3 (5-7, 5-7, 1-4, 5-3, 4-2, 6-4, 4-2, 4-2)		did not advance		
Han Yong-Mi; Jon Myong-Suk; Jo Yong-Sim; Ri Nam-Hui; Sim Un-Jong	Women's Team	Chinese Taipei (TPE); L 0-3 (1-5, 1-4, 0-5)	Japan (JPN); L 0-3 (0-5, 1-4, 1-5)	Philippines (PHI); W 3-0 (5-2, 4-2, 5-2)			did not advance	

== Synchronized swimming ==
Athlete	Event	Technical Routine		Free Routine		Total	
Athlete	Event	Points	Rank	Points	Rank	Points	Rank
Wang Ok-Gyong, Kim Yong-Mi, Kim Su-Hyang	Women's Duet	85.375	4th	86.250	4th	171.625	4th
Jang Hyang-Mi, Kim Jin-Gyong, Kim Jong-Hui, Kim Ok-Gyong, Kim Su-Hyang, Kim Yong-Mi, So Un-Byol, Wang Ok-Gyong	Women's Team	86.375	3rd	86.625	3rd	173.000	3rd place, bronze medalist(s)

== Table Tennis ==
Athlete	Event	Round of 64	Round of 32	Round of 16	Quarterfinals	Semifinals	Final
Athlete	Event	Opposition Result	Opposition Result	Opposition Result	Opposition Result	Opposition Result	Opposition Result
Kim Hyok-Bong	Men's singles	BYE	Afshin Norouzi (IRI); W 4-2 (6-11, 8-11, 12-10, 11-2, 11-9, 11-3)	Tang Peng (HKG); L 3-4 (12-10, 13-15, 11-9, 9-11, 11-7, 8-11, 4-11)	did not advance		
Jang Song-Man	Men's singles	BYE	Doan Kien Quoc (VIE); W 4-0 (11-3, 11-4, 11-3, 11-7)	Gao Ning (SIN); L 2-4 (5-11, 10-12, 13-11, 10-12, 12-10, 13-15)	did not advance		
Kim Nam-Chol; Ri Chol-Guk	Men's Doubles		Ma Liang (SIN) and Pang Xuejie (SIN); W 3-0 (11-3, 11-8, 18-16)	Cheung Yuk (HKG) and Li Ching (HKG); L 0-3 (8-11, 11-15, 5-11)	did not advance		
Kim Chol-jin; Kim Hyok-Bong	Men's Doubles		Kenta Matsudaira (JPN) and Koki Niwa (CHN); L 1-3 (13-11, 9-11, 3-11, 7-11)	did not advance			
Kim Jong	Women's singles	BYE	Ng Sock Khim (MAS); W 4-0 (11-3, 11-4, 11-3, 11-8)	Kim Kyung-Ah (KOR); L 2-4 (13-11, 6-11, 11-5, 3-11, 9-11, 8-11)	did not advance		
Kim Hye-Song	Women's singles	BYE	Nanthana Komwong (THA); W 4-2 (7-11, 11-6, 11-4, 4-11, 11-4, 11-4)	Wang Yuegu (SIN); L 1-4 (12-14, 7-11, 6-11, 12-10, 5-11)	did not advance		
Han Hye-song; Hyon Ryon-Hui	Women's Doubles		Ding Ning (CHN) and Liu Shiwen (CHN); L 0-3 (8-11, 11-13, 5-11)	did not advance			
Kim Hye-Song; Kim Jong	Women's Doubles		Beh Lee Wei (MAS) and Ng Sock Khim (MAS); W 3-2 (8-11, 11-2, 9-11, 11-6, 11-7)	Cheng I-ching (TPE) and Huang Yi-hua (TPE); L 1-3 (11-6, 7-11, 7-11, 8-11)	did not advance		
Ri Chol-Guk; Kim Hye-Song	Mixed Doubles		Doan Kien Quoc (VIE) and Mai Xuan Hang (VIE); W 3-0 (11-2, 11-2, 11-6)	Chuang Chih-yuan (TPE) and Huang Yi-hua (TPE); W 3-1 (10-12, 11-4, 11-7, 11-8)	Kenta Matsudaira (JPN) and Kasumi Ishikawa (JPN); L 0-3 (4-11, 6-11, 7-11)	did not advance	
Kim Hyok-Bong; Kim Jong	Mixed Doubles		Seiya Iishikawa (JPN) and Ai Fukuhara (JPN); L 2-3 (5-11, 11-5, 8-11, 11-4, 3-11)	did not advance			

Athlete	Event	Pool Summary				Quarterfinals	Semifinals	Final
Athlete	Event	Contest 1	Contest 2	Contest 3	Contest 4	Quarterfinals	Semifinals	Final
Athlete	Event	Opposition Result	Opposition Result	Opposition Result	Opposition Result	Opposition Result	Opposition Result	
Jang Song-Man; Kim Chol-jin; Kim Hyok-Bong; Kim Nam-Chol; Ri Chol-Guk	Men's Team	China (CHN); L 0-3 (1-3, 1-3, 0-3)	Qatar (QAT); W 3-0 (3-0, 3-0, 3-0)	Laos (LAO); W 3-0 (3-0, 3-0, 3-0)		Chinese Taipei (TPE); W 3-2 (3-1, 3-1, 1-3, 1-3, 3-0)	South Korea (KOR); L 3-0 (0-3, 0-3, 0-3) (bronze)	did not advance
Han Hye-song; Hyon Ryon-Hui; Kim Hye-Song; Kim Jong; SIN Hye Song	Women's Team	Vietnam (VIE); W 3-0 (3-1, 3-1, 3-0)	Nepal (NEP); W 3-0 (3-0, 3-0, 3-0)	Uzbekistan (UZB); W 3-0 (3-0, 3-0, 3-0)	Thailand (THA); W 3-1 (3-0, 2-3, 3-1, 3-0)	Hong Kong (HKG); W 3-1 (3-1, 3-2, 1-3, 3-1)	Singapore (SIN); L 3-0 (1-3, 1-3, 1-3) (bronze)	did not advance

== Volleyball ==
=== Women ===
Team

Choe Ryon
Han Ok-Sim
Jong Jin-Sim
Kim Hye-Ok
Kim Kyong-Suk
Kim Ok-Hui
Kim Un-Jong
Kim Yong-Mi
Min Ok-Ju
Nam Mi-Hyang
Ri Hyon-Suk
Ri Sun-Jong

==== Preliminary ====
Group B

Pos	Team	Pld	W	L	Pts	SPW	SPL	SPR	SW	SL	SR	Qualification
1	Kazakhstan	5	5	0	10	443	317	1.397	15	4	3.750	Quarterfinals
2	North Korea	5	4	1	9	431	316	1.364	14	5	2.800	Quarterfinals
3	Japan	5	3	2	8	395	344	1.148	10	8	1.250	Quarterfinals
4	Chinese Taipei	5	2	3	7	429	365	1.175	11	9	1.222	Quarterfinals
5	India	5	1	4	6	260	319	0.815	3	12	0.250	Placement 9–11
6	Maldives	5	0	5	5	78	375	0.208	0	15	0.000	Placement 9–11

Source: Results

Date	Time		Score		Set 1	Set 2	Set 3	Set 4	Set 5	Total
18 Nov	16:00	North Korea	3–0	India	25–23	25–13	25–20			75–56
19 Nov	20:00	Japan	0–3	North Korea	21–25	17–25	13–25			51–75
20 Nov	14:00	North Korea	2–3	Kazakhstan	22–25	25–22	25–17	16–25	10–15	98–104
21 Nov	16:00	Chinese Taipei	2–3	North Korea	25–17	28–26	18–25	14–25	12–15	97–108
22 Nov	18:00	North Korea	3–0	Maldives	25–4	25–1	25–3			75–8

==== Finals ====
Quarterfinals

Date	Time		Score		Set 1	Set 2	Set 3	Set 4	Set 5	Total
24 Nov	14:00	North Korea	3–2	Thailand	25–23	17–25	27–25	7–25	15–12	91–110

Semifinals

Date	Time		Score		Set 1	Set 2	Set 3	Set 4	Set 5	Total
25 Nov	20:00	China	3–0	North Korea	25–11	25–20	25–15			75–46

Bronze medal match

Date	Time		Score		Set 1	Set 2	Set 3	Set 4	Set 5	Total
27 Nov	10:00	Kazakhstan	3–0	North Korea	25–21	25–16	25–22			75–59

== Weightlifting ==
Athlete	Event	Snatch			Clean & Jerk			Total	Rank
Athlete	Event	Attempt 1	Attempt 2	Attempt 3	Attempt 1	Attempt 2	Attempt 3	Total	Rank
Cha Kum-Chol	Men's 56 kg	120	125	128	~~145~~	145	148	276	2nd place, silver medalist(s)
Kim Un-Guk	Men's 62 kg	140	145	147 AR	170	~~175~~	~~175~~	317	2nd place, silver medalist(s)
Kim Kum-Sok	Men's 69 kg	~~140~~	140	143	175	181	~~182~~	324	1st place, gold medalist(s)
Pang Kum-Chol	Men's 77 kg	150	156	~~159~~	185	192	---	348	1st place, gold medalist(s)
Pak Hyon-Suk	Women's 58 kg	100	104	~~106~~	~~128~~	128	~~135~~	232	2nd place, silver medalist(s)
Jong Chun-Mi	Women's 58 kg	93	97	98	122	~~126~~	127	225	3rd place, bronze medalist(s)
O Jong-Ae	Women's 63 kg	92	~~97~~	~~97~~	120	125	130	222	5th
Rim Jong-Sim	Women's 69 kg	100	~~103~~	103	126	~~129~~	129	232	4th
Kim Un-Ju	Women's 73 kg	~~103~~	103	107	~~138~~	138	~~144~~	245	4th

== Wrestling ==
=== Men ===
Freestyle

Athlete	Event	Round of 32	Round of 16	Quarterfinals	Semifinals	Final
Athlete	Event	Opposition Result	Opposition Result	Opposition Result	Opposition Result	Opposition Result
Yang Kyong-Il	55 kg		Jerry Angana (PHI); W ST 4-0	Damdinbazaryn Tsogtbaatar (MGL); W PP 3-1	Yasuhiro Inaba (JPN); W ST 4-0	Dilshod Mansurov (UZB); L PP 1-3 (silver)
Ri Jong-Myong	60 kg	BYE	Oybek Kamolov (UZB); W PO 3-0	Hiroyuki Oda (JPN); L PP 1-3	Repechage Round 2 match: Bazar Bazarguruev (KGZ); W PP 3-1	Bronze medal match: Dauren Zhumagaziyev (KAZ); L PP 1-3
Yang Chun-Song	66 kg		Kim Dae Sung (KOR); W PO 3-0	Purevjavyn Unurbat (MGL); W PP 3-1	Tatsuhiro Yonemitsu (JPN); L PP 1-3	Bronze medal match: Pradeep Kumar (IND); W PP 3-1 (bronze)
Jo Kum-Chol	74 kg		Ilgiz Dzhakypbekov (KAZ); L PP 1-3	did not advance		

Greco-Roman

Athlete	Event	Round of 16	Quarterfinals	Semifinals	Final
Athlete	Event	Opposition Result	Opposition Result	Opposition Result	Opposition Result
Yun Won-Chol	55 kg	Ho Quang Hai (VIE); W VT 5-0	Hamid Sourian (IRI); L PO 0-3	did not advance	
Ri Kwang-Il	60 kg	Ta Ngoc Tan (VIE); W PO 3-0	Sanjarbek Jumashev (UZB); L PP 1-3	did not advance	
Ri Chol-Hak	74 kg	BYE	Azizbek Murodov (UZB); L PP 1-3	did not advance	

=== Women ===
Freestyle

Athlete	Event	Round of 32	Round of 16	Quarterfinals	Semifinals	Final
Athlete	Event	Opposition Result	Opposition Result	Opposition Result	Opposition Result	Opposition Result
So Sim-Hyang	48 kg	BYE	Mikhrniso Nurmatova (KGZ); W PP 3-1	Hitomi Sakamoto (JPN); W PP 3-1	Nguyen Thi Lua (VIE); W VT 5-0 (gold)	
Pak Yon-Hui	55 kg	Pham Thi Hue (VIE); W VT 5-0	Geeta Phogat (IND); W PP 3-1	Saori Yoshida (JPN); L VT 0-5	Bronze medal match: Liliya Shakirova (UZB); W PP 3-1 (bronze)	

== Wushu ==
=== Women ===
Nanquan\Nangun

Athlete	Event	Nanquan		Nangun		Total	
Athlete	Event	Result	Rank	Result	Rank	Result	Rank
Kim Sol-Yong	Nanquan\Nangun All-Round	7.93	8th	8.61	7th	16.54	8th

Sanshou

Athlete	Event	Round of 16	Quarterfinals	Semifinals	Final
Athlete	Event	Opposition Result	Opposition Result	Opposition Result	Opposition Result
Choe Hyang-Hui	52 kg	Nguyen Thi Bich (VIE); L PTS 0-2	did not advance		
