= Ri Chol-guk =

North Korean table tennis player

Personal information
- Nationality: North Korea
- Born: 25 December 1985 (age 40) Pyongyang, North Korea
- Height: 1.62 m (5 ft 4 in)
- Weight: 59 kg (130 lb)

Sport
- Sport: Table tennis
- Club: Kigwancha Sports Club
- Playing style: Right-handed, penhold
- Equipment: Butterfly
- Highest ranking: 82 (March 2012)
- Current ranking: 86 (May 2012)

- Ri Chol-guk
- Hangul: 리철국
- RR: Ri Cheolguk
- MR: Ri Ch'ŏlguk

Ri Chol-guk (Korean: 리철국; born December 25, 1985, in Pyongyang) is a North Korean table tennis player. As of May 2012, Ri is ranked no. 86 in the world by the International Table Tennis Federation (ITTF). Ri is a member of the table tennis team for Kigwancha Sports Club, and is coached and trained by Kim Jin Myong. He is also right-handed, and uses the penhold grip.

Ri qualified for the men's singles tournament, along with his teammates Jang Song-Man and Kim Hyok-Bong, at the 2008 Summer Olympics in Beijing, by receiving a place as one of the top 7 seeded players from the Asian Qualification Tournament in Hong Kong. He received a single bye for the first round match, before losing out to Austria's Robert Gardos, with a set score of 3–4.
