= Jang Song-man =

North Korean table tennis player

Jang Song-man (Korean: 장성만; born 17 August 1985) is a North Korean table tennis player. He competed for North Korea at the 2008 and 2012 Summer Olympics, in the men's individual and men's team event respectively.
