= Tajikistan at the 2010 Asian Games =

- IOC code: TJK
- NOC: National Olympic Committee of the Republic of Tajikistan

in Guangzhou
- Medals Ranked 26th: Gold 1 Silver 0 Bronze 3 Total 4

Asian Games appearances (overview)
- 1994; 1998; 2002; 2006; 2010; 2014; 2018; 2022; 2026

Tajikistan participated in the 16th Asian Games with 76 Athletes.

== Medalists ==
Medal	Name	Sport	Event	Date
Gold	Dilshod Nazarov	Athletics	Hammer throw	21 November
Bronze	Rasul Boqiev	Judo	Men's 73 kg	15 November
Bronze	Murodjon Tuychiev	Greco-Roman Wrestling	Men's 120 kg	23 November
Bronze	Jakhon Qurbonov	Boxing	Men's 91 kg	24 November
