= Nepal at the 2010 Asian Games =

- IOC code: NEP
- NOC: Nepal Olympic Committee

in Guangzhou
- Competitors: 140 in 20 sports
- Medals: Gold 0 Silver 0 Bronze 1 Total 1

Asian Games appearances (overview)
- 1951; 1954; 1958; 1962; 1966; 1970; 1974; 1978; 1982; 1986; 1990; 1994; 1998; 2002; 2006; 2010; 2014; 2018; 2022; 2026

Nepal participated at the 16th Asian Games in Guangzhou, China. It won one bronze medal.

== Medalists ==
Medal	Name	Sport	Event	Date
Bronze	Deepak Maharjan	Boxing	Men's 81kg	16 November
