= Laos at the 2010 Asian Games =

- IOC code: LAO
- NOC: National Olympic Committee of Lao

in Guangzhou
- Medals Ranked 34th: Gold 0 Silver 0 Bronze 2 Total 2

Asian Games appearances (overview)
- 1974; 1978; 1982; 1986; 1990; 1994; 1998; 2002; 2006; 2010; 2014; 2018; 2022; 2026

Laos participated in the 16th Asian Games in Guangzhou from 12 November to 27 November 2010.

== Medalists ==
Medal	Name	Sport	Event	Date
Bronze	Phoxay Aphaylath	Wushu	Men's Sanshou 56kg	16 November
Bronze	Paloy Barckkham	Wushu	Women's Sanshou 60kg	16 November
