= Mongolia at the 2010 Asian Games =

- IOC code: MGL
- NOC: Mongolian National Olympic Committee

in Guangzhou
- Medals Ranked 21st: Gold 2 Silver 5 Bronze 9 Total 16

Asian Games appearances (overview)
- 1974; 1978; 1982; 1986; 1990; 1994; 1998; 2002; 2006; 2010; 2014; 2018; 2022; 2026

Mongolia participated in the 16th Asian Games in Guangzhou, China from 12 November to 27 November 2010. It won 2 gold, 5 silver and 9 bronze medals.

== Medal summary ==
=== Medals by sport ===
Sport	Gold	Silver	Bronze	Total
Boxing				
Judo				
Shooting				
Wrestling				
Wushu				
Total				

=== Medalists ===
Medal	Name	Sport	Event	Date
Gold	Ganzorigiin Mandakhnaran	Wrestling	Men's freestyle 60 kg	23 November
Gold	Gelegjamtsyn Naranchimeg	Wrestling	Women's freestyle 72 kg	26 November
Silver	Ochirbatyn Nasanburmaa	Wrestling	Women's freestyle 63 kg	26 November
Silver	Jargalsaikhany Chuluunbat	Wrestling	Men's freestyle 120 kg	25 November
Silver	Munkhbaataryn Bundmaa	Judo	Women's 52 kg	15 November
Silver	Tömörchödöriin Bayartsetseg; Otryadyn Gündegmaa; Tsogbadrakhyn Mönkhzul	Shooting	Women's 25m pistol team	15 November
Silver	Erdenesoyolyn Undram	Boxing	Women's 75kg	26 November
Bronze	Tümen-Odyn Battögs	Judo	Women's 57 kg	15 November
Bronze	Tsend-Ayushiin Naranjargal	Judo	Women's 70 kg	14 November
Bronze	Baljinnyamyn Bat-Erdene	Judo	Women's 48 kg	16 November
Bronze	Khadbaataryn Munkhbaatar	Judo	Men's open category	16 November
Bronze	Dorjgotovyn Tserenkhand	Judo	Women's open category	15 November
Bronze	Magsarjavyn Batjargal	Wushu	Men's sanshou 75kg	16 November
Bronze	Dorjvaanchigiin Gombodorj	Wrestling	Men's freestyle 74 kg	24 November
Bronze	Pürveegiin Ösökhbaatar	Wrestling	Men's freestyle 84 kg	24 November
Bronze	Jargalyn Otgonjargal	Boxing	Men's 69kg	25 November

== See also ==
- 2010 Asian Games medal table
