= Bowling at the 2010 Asian Games =

- Venue: Tianhe Bowling Hall
- Dates: 15–24 November 2010
- Competitors: 178 from 17 nations

Bowling at the 2010 Asian Games was held in Tianhe Bowling Hall, Guangzhou, China from November 15 to 24, 2010.

== Schedule ==
●	Round	●	Last round	P	Preliminary	F	Final

Event↓/Date →	15th Mon	16th Tue	17th Wed	18th Thu	19th Fri	20th Sat	21st Sun	22nd Mon	23rd Tue	24th Wed	
Men's singles	●										
Men's doubles			●								
Men's trios					●	●					
Men's team of 5							●	●			
Men's all-events	●		●		●	●	●	●			
Men's masters									P	P	F
Women's singles		●									
Women's doubles				●							
Women's trios					●	●					
Women's team of 5							●	●			
Women's all-events		●		●	●	●	●	●			
Women's masters									P	P	F

== Medalists ==
=== Men ===
Event	Gold	Silver	Bronze
Singles	Biboy Rivera; Philippines	Mohammad Al-Regeebah; Athletes from Kuwait	Frederick Ong; Philippines
Doubles	Malaysia; Adrian Ang; Alex Liew	Japan; Tomokatsu Yamashita; Shogo Wada	Shared silver
Doubles	Malaysia; Adrian Ang; Alex Liew	Singapore; Remy Ong; Jason Yeong-Nathan	Shared silver
Trios	South Korea; Choi Yong-kyu; Jang Dong-chul; Choi Bok-eum	South Korea; Suh Sang-cheon; Cho Young-seon; Hong Hae-sol	Qatar; Mansour Al-Awami; Mubarak Al-Merikhi; Fahad Al-Emadi
Team of 5	South Korea; Suh Sang-cheon; Choi Yong-kyu; Jang Dong-chul; Cho Young-seon; Choi Bok-eum; Hong Hae-sol	Malaysia; Adrian Ang; Aaron Kong; Alex Liew; Syafiq Ridhwan; Mohd Nur Aiman; Zulmazran Zulkifli	Hong Kong; Wu Siu Hong; Eric Tseng; Michael Mak; Wicky Yeung; Michael Tsang; Cyrus Cheung
All-events	Alex Liew; Malaysia	Choi Yong-kyu; South Korea	Choi Bok-eum; South Korea
Masters	Choi Bok-eum; South Korea	Mohammad Al-Regeebah; Athletes from Kuwait	Du Jianchao; China

=== Women ===
Event	Gold	Silver	Bronze
Singles	Hwang Sun-ok; South Korea	Shayna Ng; Singapore	New Hui Fen; Singapore
Doubles	South Korea; Choi Jin-a; Gang Hye-eun	South Korea; Hong Su-yeon; Son Yun-hee	China; Zhang Yuhong; Yang Suiling
Trios	Singapore; Cherie Tan; Geraldine Ng; Shayna Ng	South Korea; Choi Jin-a; Son Yun-hee; Hwang Sun-ok	China; Zhang Yuhong; Yang Suiling; Chen Dongdong
Team of 5	South Korea; Choi Jin-a; Gang Hye-eun; Hong Su-yeon; Son Yun-hee; Hwang Sun-ok; Jeon Eun-hee	Indonesia; Putty Armein; Ivana Hie; Novie Phang; Sharon Limansantoso; Tannya Roumimper; Shalima Zalsha	Malaysia; Esther Cheah; Sharon Koh; Zatil Iman; Shalin Zulkifli; Zandra Aziela; Jane Sin
All-events	Hwang Sun-ok; South Korea	Choi Jin-a; South Korea	Zhang Yuhong; China
Masters	Hwang Sun-ok; South Korea	Cherie Tan; Singapore	Choi Jin-a; South Korea

== Medal table ==
Rank	Nation	Gold	Silver	Bronze	Total
1	South Korea (KOR)	8	5	2	15
2	Malaysia (MAS)	2	1	1	4
3	Singapore (SIN)	1	3	1	5
4	Philippines (PHI)	1	0	1	2
5	Athletes from Kuwait (IOC)	0	2	0	2
6	Indonesia (INA)	0	1	0	1
6	Japan (JPN)	0	1	0	1
8	China (CHN)	0	0	4	4
9	Hong Kong (HKG)	0	0	1	1
9	Qatar (QAT)	0	0	1	1
Totals (10 entries)		12	13	11	36

== Participating nations ==
A total of 178 athletes from 17 nations competed in bowling at the 2010 Asian Games:

- Athletes from Kuwait (12)
- China (11)
- Chinese Taipei (12)
- Hong Kong (11)
- India (10)
- Indonesia (12)
- Japan (12)
- Macau (12)
- Malaysia (12)
- Mongolia (10)
- Philippines (12)
- Qatar (6)
- Singapore (12)
- South Korea (12)
- Thailand (10)
- United Arab Emirates (6)
- Uzbekistan (6)
