= Bowling at the 2010 Asian Games – Men's all-events =

Men's all-events at the 2010 Asian Games
- Venue: Tianhe Bowling Hall
- Date: 15–22 November 2010
- Competitors: 101 from 17 nations

Medalists
gold medal	Alex Liew	Malaysia
silver medal	Choi Yong-kyu	South Korea
bronze medal	Choi Bok-eum	South Korea

The men's all-events competition at the 2010 Asian Games in Guangzhou took place at the Tianhe Bowling Hall from 15 November to 22 November 2010.

All-events scores are calculated by totaling the series scores from the singles, doubles, trios and team competitions.

== Schedule ==
All times are China Standard Time (UTC+08:00)

Date	Time	Event
Monday, 15 November 2010	09:00	Singles
Wednesday, 17 November 2010	09:00	Doubles
Friday, 19 November 2010	09:00	Trios – First block
Saturday, 20 November 2010	09:00	Trios – Second block
Sunday, 21 November 2010	09:00	Team – First block
Monday, 22 November 2010	09:00	Team – Second block

== Results ==
Rank	Athlete	Singles	Doubles	Trios	Team	Total
1st place, gold medalist(s)	Alex Liew (MAS)	1354	1339	1330	1425	5448
2nd place, silver medalist(s)	Choi Yong-kyu (KOR)	1370	1319	1433	1319	5441
3rd place, bronze medalist(s)	Choi Bok-eum (KOR)	1313	1433	1321	1364	5431
4	Aaron Kong (MAS)	1339	1246	1278	1467	5330
5	Ryan Leonard Lalisang (INA)	1363	1439	1224	1291	5317
6	Mansour Al-Awami (QAT)	1233	1246	1341	1443	5263
7	Jang Dong-chul (KOR)	1365	1250	1307	1322	5244
8	Biboy Rivera (PHI)	1414	1277	1267	1273	5231
9	Eric Tseng (HKG)	1328	1265	1374	1263	5230
10	Shogo Wada (JPN)	1325	1379	1213	1306	5223
11	Jason Yeong-Nathan (SIN)	1280	1401	1259	1265	5205
12	Cho Young-seon (KOR)	1312	1283	1279	1330	5204
13	Toshihiko Takahashi (JPN)	1278	1302	1297	1321	5198
14	Yannaphon Larpapharat (THA)	1225	1347	1275	1334	5181
15	Du Jianchao (CHN)	1257	1208	1418	1296	5179
16	Mohammad Al-Regeebah (IOC)	1404	1191	1241	1336	5172
17	Mi Zhongli (CHN)	1192	1356	1370	1252	5170
18	Michael Mak (HKG)	1345	1234	1337	1245	5161
18	Masaaki Takemoto (JPN)	1212	1247	1377	1325	5161
20	Michael Tsang (HKG)	1213	1307	1254	1384	5158
21	Adrian Ang (MAS)	1287	1372	1238	1236	5133
22	Zhang Peng (CHN)	1192	1414	1258	1259	5123
23	Nayef Eqab (UAE)	1315	1254	1212	1333	5114
24	Hong Hae-sol (KOR)	1239	1145	1355	1374	5113
25	Kao Hai-yuan (TPE)	1376	1242	1357	1136	5111
26	Yang Nien-hua (TPE)	1281	1268	1250	1284	5083
26	Somjed Kusonphithak (THA)	1361	1233	1301	1188	5083
28	Syafiq Ridhwan (MAS)	1287	1201	1333	1261	5082
29	Tomoyuki Sasaki (JPN)	1283	1344	1215	1211	5053
30	Mahmood Al-Attar (UAE)	1257	1227	1228	1336	5048
31	Sayed Ibrahim Al-Hashemi (UAE)	1190	1257	1229	1357	5033
32	Mohammed Al-Qubaisi (UAE)	1257	1235	1326	1212	5030
33	Suh Sang-cheon (KOR)	1282	1250	1318	1176	5026
34	Remy Ong (SIN)	1334	1290	1242	1134	5000
35	Phoemphun Yakasem (THA)	1170	1452	1173	1199	4994
36	Cheng Hsing-chao (TPE)	1239	1191	1270	1293	4993
37	Yeri Ramadona (INA)	1193	1277	1257	1264	4991
38	Rakan Al-Ameeri (IOC)	1329	1222	1194	1244	4989
39	Jasem Al-Saqer (IOC)	1366	1351	1113	1156	4986
39	Basil Low (SIN)	1269	1319	1192	1206	4986
41	Frederick Ong (PHI)	1390	1178	1259	1147	4974
42	Fahad Al-Emadi (QAT)	1132	1296	1244	1283	4955
43	Mubarak Al-Merikhi (QAT)	1171	1271	1323	1187	4952
44	Basel Al-Anzi (IOC)	1243	1314	1229	1164	4950
45	Wu Siu Hong (HKG)	1186	1264	1138	1359	4947
46	Chester King (PHI)	1294	1219	1240	1190	4943
47	Mohd Nur Aiman (MAS)	1200	1239	1227	1276	4942
48	Zulmazran Zulkifli (MAS)	1216	1221	1203	1299	4939
49	Wang Tien-fu (TPE)	1244	1272	1222	1200	4938
50	Badin Lerdpiriyasakulkit (THA)	1210	1201	1225	1296	4932
51	Nobuhito Fuji (JPN)	1209	1223	1221	1267	4920
52	Wicky Yeung (HKG)	1221	1263	1191	1224	4899
53	Raoul Miranda (PHI)	1206	1192	1350	1147	4895
54	Shaker Ali Al-Hassan (UAE)	1286	1279	1158	1170	4893
55	Zhang Yijia (CHN)	1198	1242	1225	1212	4877
56	Khaled Al-Debayyan (IOC)	1334	1118	1232	1189	4873
57	Benjamin Lim (SIN)	1088	1255	1275	1247	4865
58	Dhruv Sarda (IND)	1240	1110	1205	1304	4859
59	Cyrus Cheung (HKG)	1249	1192	1158	1251	4850
60	Tomokatsu Yamashita (JPN)	1189	1312	1160	1181	4842
61	Rangga Dwichandra Yudhira (INA)	1240	1168	1227	1200	4835
62	Pan Yuehong (CHN)	1174	1204	1142	1298	4818
63	Hengki Susanto (INA)	1122	1241	1237	1203	4803
64	Fang Chih-nan (TPE)	1131	1253	1183	1227	4794
65	Sun Kuang-min (TPE)	1216	1183	1178	1215	4792
66	Salem Al-Marzouqi (QAT)	1203	1198	1125	1262	4788
67	Tam Tsz Sun (MAC)	1178	1127	1197	1267	4769
68	Girish Ashok Gaba (IND)	1205	1189	1201	1145	4740
69	Hussain Nasir Al-Suwaidi (UAE)	1216	1197	1164	1155	4732
70	Mark Wong (SIN)	1155	1201	1208	1154	4718
71	Dechochai Tinjiratip (THA)	1127	1210	1061	1276	4674
72	Benshir Layoso (PHI)	1193	1202	1133	1122	4650
73	William Widjaja (INA)	1119	1207	1138	1182	4646
74	Yousef Al-Jaber (QAT)	1101	1144	1154	1240	4639
75	Choi Io Fai (MAC)	1164	1194	1150	1126	4634
76	Apiwich Watanaphongsakorn (THA)	1176	1117	1125	1210	4628
77	Ng Tiac Pin (SIN)	1323	988	1137	1131	4579
78	Srinath Pobbathi (IND)	1199	1079	1151	1148	4577
79	Shabbir Dhankot (IND)	1078	1108	1201	1174	4561
80	Kot Ka Hou (MAC)	1065	1148	1182	1163	4558
81	Jose Manuel Machon (MAC)	1092	1069	1087	1307	4555
82	Lok Hei Ieong (MAC)	1162	1120	1076	1192	4550
83	Dilbir Singh (IND)	1134	1193	1067	1131	4525
84	Abdulla Al-Jusaiman (QAT)	1194	1088	1096	1143	4521
85	Akaash Ashok Kumar (IND)	1079	1221	1094	1122	4516
86	Diwan Rezaldy (INA)	916	1285	1122	1190	4513
87	Jose Collins (PHI)	1109	1148	1123	1050	4430
88	Lee Tak Man (MAC)	1197	1123	1028	1080	4428
89	Sharyn Baatar (MGL)	1100	985	1135	1149	4369
90	Fayzulla Nasirov (UZB)	1018	1098	1074	991	4181
91	Bakhodir Arifov (UZB)	995	1002	1086	1091	4174
92	Viktor Smirnov (UZB)	1063	1046	967	1055	4131
93	Miyesengyn Tüvshinsanaa (MGL)	985	1039	1034	1070	4128
94	Mohammad Al-Zaidan (IOC)	1273	1125	1214	513	4125
95	Surat Makhkamov (UZB)	977	1017	1080	1012	4086
96	Kudrat Khilyamov (UZB)	979	881	1072	1041	3973
97	Dondovyn Zorigt (MGL)	1012	1012	926	973	3923
98	Jamtsyn Sodnomdorj (MGL)	927	940	945	985	3797
99	Tsog-Erdeniin Molor (MGL)	944	928	891	840	3603
100	Tsendkhüügiin Batjargal (MGL)	750	856	902	862	3370
101	Sergey Sapov (UZB)	1108	1036	1104	0	3248
