= Bowling at the 2010 Asian Games – Women's all-events =

Women's all-events at the 2010 Asian Games
- Venue: Tianhe Bowling Hall
- Date: 16–22 November 2010
- Competitors: 77 from 14 nations

Medalists
| gold medal | Hwang Sun-ok | South Korea |
| silver medal | Choi Jin-a | South Korea |
| bronze medal | Zhang Yuhong | China |

The women's all-events competition at the 2010 Asian Games in Guangzhou was held from 16 November to 22 November 2010 at Tianhe Bowling Hall.

All-events scores are compiled by totaling series scores from the singles, doubles, trios and team competitions.

== Schedule ==
All times are China Standard Time (UTC+08:00)

| Date | Time | Event |
|---|---|---|
| Tuesday, 16 November 2010 | 09:00 | Singles |
| Thursday, 18 November 2010 | 09:00 | Doubles |
| Friday, 19 November 2010 | 13:30 | Trios – First block |
| Saturday, 20 November 2010 | 13:30 | Trios – Second block |
| Sunday, 21 November 2010 | 14:30 | Team – First block |
| Monday, 22 November 2010 | 14:30 | Team – Second block |

== Results ==
Legend

- DNS — Did not start

| Rank | Athlete | Singles | Doubles | Trios | Team | Total |
|---|---|---|---|---|---|---|
| 1st place, gold medalist(s) | Hwang Sun-ok (KOR) | 1395 | 1369 | 1330 | 1414 | 5508 |
| 2nd place, silver medalist(s) | Choi Jin-a (KOR) | 1153 | 1396 | 1308 | 1419 | 5276 |
| 3 | Son Yun-hee (KOR) | 1298 | 1397 | 1211 | 1269 | 5175 |
| 4 | Hong Su-yeon (KOR) | 1329 | 1267 | 1197 | 1344 | 5137 |
| 3rd place, bronze medalist(s) | Zhang Yuhong (CHN) | 1156 | 1324 | 1301 | 1350 | 5131 |
| 6 | Shayna Ng (SIN) | 1342 | 1192 | 1293 | 1270 | 5097 |
| 7 | Cherie Tan (SIN) | 1309 | 1233 | 1298 | 1251 | 5091 |
| 8 | Esther Cheah (MAS) | 1136 | 1187 | 1299 | 1435 | 5057 |
| 9 | Sharon Koh (MAS) | 1318 | 1224 | 1265 | 1243 | 5050 |
| 10 | Jeon Eun-hee (KOR) | 1199 | 1234 | 1327 | 1286 | 5046 |
| 11 | Maki Nakano (JPN) | 1268 | 1266 | 1351 | 1117 | 5002 |
| 12 | Tannya Roumimper (INA) | 1300 | 1265 | 1170 | 1237 | 4972 |
| 12 | Liza del Rosario (PHI) | 1157 | 1311 | 1228 | 1276 | 4972 |
| 12 | Jazreel Tan (SIN) | 1185 | 1255 | 1296 | 1236 | 4972 |
| 15 | Gang Hye-eun (KOR) | 1216 | 1291 | 1220 | 1243 | 4970 |
| 16 | Geraldine Ng (SIN) | 1200 | 1302 | 1326 | 1121 | 4949 |
| 16 | Apple Posadas (PHI) | 1183 | 1221 | 1297 | 1248 | 4949 |
| 18 | Chen Dongdong (CHN) | 1219 | 1209 | 1253 | 1250 | 4931 |
| 19 | Yang Suiling (CHN) | 1167 | 1269 | 1287 | 1206 | 4929 |
| 20 | Tang Ya-chun (TPE) | 1235 | 1322 | 1135 | 1230 | 4922 |
| 21 | New Hui Fen (SIN) | 1341 | 1147 | 1136 | 1271 | 4895 |
| 21 | Zandra Aziela (MAS) | 1182 | 1175 | 1323 | 1215 | 4895 |
| 23 | Misaki Mukotani (JPN) | 1146 | 1310 | 1215 | 1218 | 4889 |
| 24 | Haruka Matsuda (JPN) | 1289 | 1152 | 1196 | 1233 | 4870 |
| 25 | Novie Phang (INA) | 1008 | 1212 | 1319 | 1312 | 4851 |
| 26 | Kimberly Lao (PHI) | 1166 | 1218 | 1184 | 1274 | 4842 |
| 27 | Putty Armein (INA) | 1219 | 1200 | 1165 | 1255 | 4839 |
| 28 | Shalin Zulkifli (MAS) | 1124 | 1245 | 1256 | 1189 | 4814 |
| 29 | Zatil Iman (MAS) | 1180 | 1204 | 1216 | 1213 | 4813 |
| 30 | Pan Yu-fen (TPE) | 1130 | 1215 | 1211 | 1251 | 4807 |
| 31 | Kanako Ishimine (JPN) | 1077 | 1270 | 1223 | 1234 | 4804 |
| 32 | Yukari Honma (JPN) | 1084 | 1218 | 1192 | 1303 | 4797 |
| 33 | Tsai Hsin-yi (TPE) | 1178 | 1178 | 1186 | 1251 | 4793 |
| 34 | Angkana Netrviseth (THA) | 1146 | 1320 | 1168 | 1158 | 4792 |
| 35 | Milki Ng (HKG) | 1116 | 1239 | 1121 | 1262 | 4738 |
| 36 | Jane Sin (MAS) | 1161 | 1169 | 1197 | 1202 | 4729 |
| 36 | Liza Clutario (PHI) | 1101 | 1273 | 1128 | 1227 | 4729 |
| 38 | Chan Shuk Han (HKG) | 1152 | 1162 | 1184 | 1207 | 4705 |
| 39 | Sharon Limansantoso (INA) | 1146 | 1177 | 1092 | 1244 | 4659 |
| 40 | Jasmine Yeong-Nathan (SIN) | 1151 | 1233 | 1194 | 1073 | 4651 |
| 41 | Vanessa Fung (HKG) | 1085 | 1143 | 1188 | 1225 | 4641 |
| 42 | Xu Lan (CHN) | 1149 | 1192 | 1120 | 1146 | 4607 |
| 43 | Ivana Hie (INA) | 996 | 1114 | 1185 | 1292 | 4587 |
| 44 | Yang Hao-ting (TPE) | 1157 | 1052 | 1235 | 1129 | 4573 |
| 45 | Nao Ohishi (JPN) | 1076 | 1177 | 1070 | 1249 | 4572 |
| 46 | Chan Weng Sam (MAC) | 1023 | 1001 | 1273 | 1254 | 4551 |
| 47 | Sun Hongdou (CHN) | 1101 | 1153 | 1129 | 1159 | 4542 |
| 48 | Benchawan Poungthong (THA) | 1048 | 1152 | 1175 | 1164 | 4539 |
| 49 | Jiang Wei (CHN) | 1108 | 1108 | 1164 | 1150 | 4530 |
| 50 | Shalima Zalsha (INA) | 996 | 1144 | 1159 | 1214 | 4513 |
| 51 | Lara Posadas (PHI) | 1124 | 1121 | 1111 | 1148 | 4504 |
| 52 | Krizziah Tabora (PHI) | 1084 | 1251 | 989 | 1125 | 4449 |
| 53 | Apinyata Jonbumrung (THA) | 1050 | 1128 | 1157 | 1107 | 4442 |
| 54 | Filomena Choi (MAC) | 1104 | 1229 | 1104 | 986 | 4423 |
| 55 | Wang Ting-wen (TPE) | 1053 | 1120 | 1090 | 1156 | 4419 |
| 56 | Wang Yu-ling (TPE) | 1131 | 1192 | 1062 | 1012 | 4397 |
| 57 | Zoe Tam (HKG) | 1041 | 1051 | 1162 | 1137 | 4391 |
| 58 | Hui Tong (MAC) | 995 | 1157 | 1188 | 1049 | 4389 |
| 59 | Pratima Hegde (IND) | 1093 | 1077 | 1116 | 1081 | 4367 |
| 60 | Swapna Mitra (IND) | 1045 | 1139 | 1072 | 1105 | 4361 |
| 61 | Panacha Boonma (THA) | 1145 | 1051 | 1073 | 1059 | 4328 |
| 62 | Julia Lam (MAC) | 1009 | 1091 | 1016 | 1120 | 4236 |
| 63 | Sonia Ho (HKG) | 992 | 1068 | 1005 | 1066 | 4131 |
| 64 | Hanadi Al-Mezaiel (IOC) | 893 | 1089 | 1066 | 1074 | 4122 |
| 65 | Un Im Cheng (MAC) | 1004 | 1045 | 1060 | 1000 | 4109 |
| 66 | Tchiang Sin U (MAC) | 970 | 1091 | 1016 | 982 | 4059 |
| 67 | Bashaer Rashed (IOC) | 992 | 950 | 975 | 879 | 3796 |
| 68 | Fatima Mohammad (IOC) | 835 | 905 | 983 | 985 | 3708 |
| 69 | Farah Al-Mulla (IOC) | 890 | 956 | 817 | 866 | 3529 |
| 70 | Shaikha Al-Hendi (IOC) | 833 | 834 | 738 | 845 | 3250 |
| 71 | Shatarbalyn Gerlee (MGL) | 836 | 935 | 901 | 0 | 2672 |
| 72 | Sosoryn Khandaa (MGL) | 860 | 868 | 823 | 0 | 2551 |
| 73 | Terveegiin Dorjderem (MGL) | 796 | 820 | 818 | 0 | 2434 |
| 74 | Tsodongiin Urantsetseg (MGL) | 792 | 840 | 749 | 0 | 2381 |
| 75 | Abrar Al-Zanki (IOC) | 710 | 666 | 652 | 343 | 2371 |
| — | Sumathi Nallabantu (IND) | | | | | DNS |
| — | Namratha Karanth (IND) | | | | | DNS |

- Zhang Yuhong was awarded bronze because of no three-medal sweep per country rule.
