= Bowling at the 2010 Asian Games – Men's team =

Men's team of 5 at the 2010 Asian Games
- Venue: Tianhe Bowling Hall
- Date: 21–22 November 2010
- Competitors: 101 from 17 nations

Medalists
gold medal	South Korea; Suh Sang-cheon, Choi Yong-kyu, Jang Dong-chul, Cho Young-seon, Choi Bok-eum, Hong Hae-sol
silver medal	Malaysia; Adrian Ang, Aaron Kong, Alex Liew, Syafiq Ridhwan, Mohd Nur Aiman, Zulmazran Zulkifli
bronze medal	Hong Kong; Wu Siu Hong, Eric Tseng, Michael Mak, Wicky Yeung, Michael Tsang, Cyrus Cheung

The men's team of five competition at the 2010 Asian Games in Guangzhou was held on 21 and 22 November 2010 at Tianhe Bowling Hall.

== Schedule ==
All times are China Standard Time (UTC+08:00)

Date	Time	Event
Sunday, 21 November 2010	09:00	First block
Monday, 22 November 2010	09:00	Second block

== Results ==
Rank	Team	Game						Total
Rank	Team	1	2	3	4	5	6	Total
1st place, gold medalist(s)	South Korea (KOR)	1055	985	1168	1176	1137	1133	6654
	Suh Sang-cheon	179	209	199				587
	Choi Yong-kyu	212	189	257	212	203	246	1319
	Jang Dong-chul				246	254	180	680
	Cho Young-seon	186	199	232	238	227	248	1330
	Choi Bok-eum	241	206	244	211	246	216	1364
	Hong Hae-sol	237	182	236	269	207	243	1374
2nd place, silver medalist(s)	Malaysia (MAS)	1174	1045	1136	1183	1079	962	6579
	Adrian Ang	239	181	161	258	194	203	1236
	Aaron Kong	268	235	298	226	221	219	1467
	Alex Liew	249	225	259	265	215	212	1425
	Syafiq Ridhwan	231	179	182	245	242	182	1261
	Mohd Nur Aiman	187	225	236	189	207	146	1190
3rd place, bronze medalist(s)	Hong Kong (HKG)	973	1151	1090	1123	1110	1028	6475
	Wu Siu Hong	209	237	209	226	254	224	1359
	Eric Tseng	197	221	198	254	190	203	1263
	Michael Mak	182	214	200	222	206	221	1245
	Wicky Yeung	169	251	215	172	254	163	1224
	Michael Tsang	216	228	268	249	206	217	1384
4	United Arab Emirates (UAE)	1026	1111	939	1154	1054	1124	6408
	Shaker Ali Al-Hassan	206	176	151	199	225	213	1170
	Sayed Ibrahim Al-Hashemi	245	193	237	228	188	266	1357
	Nayef Eqab	184	237	160	268	251	233	1333
	Mahmood Al-Attar	223	267	181	245	200	220	1336
	Mohammed Al-Qubaisi	168	238	210	214	190	192	1212
5	Japan (JPN)	1042	1096	1101	1064	1085	1001	6389
	Toshihiko Takahashi	210	247	247	183	235	199	1321
	Tomoyuki Sasaki	224	210	151	200	243	183	1211
	Tomokatsu Yamashita	171	191	216				578
	Nobuhito Fuji				224	178	246	648
	Masaaki Takemoto	224	190	244	223	257	187	1325
	Shogo Wada	213	258	243	234	172	186	1306
6	China (CHN)	1124	1001	1065	1060	981	1086	6317
	Zhang Peng	209	215	235	195	180	225	1259
	Pan Yuehong	210	208	253	201	225	201	1298
	Zhang Yijia	225	197	182	226	168	214	1212
	Mi Zhongli	254	189	189	211	174	235	1252
	Du Jianchao	226	192	206	227	234	211	1296
7	Qatar (QAT)	1040	1094	1122	1047	1043	967	6313
	Yousef Al-Jaber	191	205	191				587
	Mansour Al-Awami	224	227	288	256	211	237	1443
	Salem Al-Marzouqi	195	231	202	201	242	191	1262
	Mubarak Al-Merikhi	212	225	196	213	182	159	1187
	Abdulla Al-Jusaiman				168	184	199	551
	Fahad Al-Emadi	218	206	245	209	224	181	1283
8	Thailand (THA)	951	1125	928	1089	1121	1013	6227
	Phoemphun Yakasem	188	235	172	171	225	208	1199
	Badin Lerdpiriyasakulkit	204	257	180	241	235	179	1296
	Yannaphon Larpapharat	237	213	137	246	258	243	1334
	Apiwich Watanaphongsakorn	161	207	257	231	177	177	1210
	Somjed Kusonphithak	161	213	182	200	226	206	1188
9	Indonesia (INA)	994	994	992	1092	1011	1065	6148
	Ryan Leonard Lalisang	203	231	220	213	198	226	1291
	Hengki Susanto	197	175	224	213	183	211	1203
	Diwan Rezaldy	178	206	173	193	245	195	1190
	Yeri Ramadona	213	223	193	258	171	206	1264
	Rangga Dwichandra Yudhira	203	159	182	215	214	227	1200
10	Chinese Taipei (TPE)	1075	1074	1013	981	928	1069	6140
	Fang Chih-nan	181	214	217	203	201	211	1227
	Kao Hai-yuan	211	211	169	168	181	196	1136
	Wang Tien-fu	212	191	220	192	156	229	1200
	Cheng Hsing-chao	237	241	191	213	190	221	1293
	Yang Nien-hua	234	217	216	205	200	212	1284
11	Athletes from Kuwait (IOC)	1029	1061	1072	1025	929	973	6089
	Mohammad Al-Regeebah	233	258	247	201	205	192	1336
	Jasem Al-Saqer	213	182	204	207	163	187	1156
	Basel Al-Anzi	205	203	234	191	176	155	1164
	Rakan Al-Ameeri	202	236	156	211	235	204	1244
	Khaled Al-Debayyan	176	182	231	215	150	235	1189
12	Philippines (PHI)	983	1051	960	961	1020	990	5965
	Chester King	215	228	214	200	244	175	1276
	Benshir Layoso	170	182	179	201	198	192	1122
	Raoul Miranda	202	226	177	136	191	215	1147
	Frederick Ong	204	171	186	217	173	196	1147
	Biboy Rivera	192	244	204	207	214	212	1273
13	India (IND)	1021	996	964	981	997	943	5902
	Dilbir Singh	196	184	190	191	191	179	1131
	Shabbir Dhankot	222	179	200	192	205	176	1174
	Dhruv Sarda	194	243	215	227	212	213	1304
	Srinath Pobbathi	214	189	157	214	189	185	1148
	Girish Ashok Gaba	195	201	202	157	200	190	1145
14	Singapore (SIN)	899	1099	971	966	986	958	5879
	Basil Low	154	202	232	269	176	173	1206
	Remy Ong	174	222	179	175	184	200	1134
	Jason Yeong-Nathan	223	223	203	185	223	208	1265
	Benjamin Lim				143	221	216	580
	Mark Wong	156	237	170				563
	Ng Tiac Pin	192	215	187	194	182	161	1131
15	Macau (MAC)	920	1029	1068	930	931	950	5828
	Choi Io Fai	165	214	216	156	209	166	1126
	Lok Hei Ieong	236	204	187	164	168	233	1192
	Lee Tak Man	147	169	221	188	165	190	1080
	Kot Ka Hou	181	211	230	206	164	171	1163
	Tam Tsz Sun	191	231	214	216	225	190	1267
16	Uzbekistan (UZB)	813	854	867	886	908	862	5190
	Viktor Smirnov	163	173	176	170	182	191	1055
	Bakhodir Arifov	162	182	169	186	204	188	1091
	Fayzulla Nasirov	163	142	153	161	170	202	991
	Kudrat Khilyamov	137	200	199	178	177	150	1041
	Surat Makhkamov	188	157	170	191	175	131	1012
17	Mongolia (MGL)	850	810	819	858	804	876	5017
	Tsog-Erdeniin Molor	144	123	137	144	135	157	840
	Sharyn Baatar	203	158	185	197	184	222	1149
	Jamtsyn Sodnomdorj	163	159	200	178	150	135	985
	Miyesengyn Tüvshinsanaa	193	199	162	165	177	174	1070
	Dondovyn Zorigt	147	171	135	174	158	188	973
Individuals
	Cyrus Cheung (HKG)	213	248	227	197	172	194	1251
	William Widjaja (INA)	158	190	204	222	202	206	1182
	Akaash Ashok Kumar (IND)	150	225	224	211	155	157	1122
	Mohammad Al-Zaidan (IOC)	170	160	183	0	0	0	513
	Nobuhito Fuji (JPN)	183	193	243				619
	Tomokatsu Yamashita (JPN)				180	222	201	603
	Jang Dong-chul (KOR)	203	213	226				642
	Suh Sang-cheon (KOR)				171	215	203	589
	Jose Manuel Machon (MAC)	224	242	195	192	198	256	1307
	Zulmazran Zulkifli (MAS)	231	201	255	224	213	175	1299
	Tsendkhüügiin Batjargal (MGL)	172	123	122	151	148	146	862
	Jose Collins (PHI)	175	173	173	167	205	157	1050
	Yousef Al-Jaber (QAT)				245	247	161	653
	Abdulla Al-Jusaiman (QAT)	211	188	193				592
	Benjamin Lim (SIN)	225	225	217				667
	Mark Wong (SIN)				182	222	187	591
	Dechochai Tinjiratip (THA)	224	204	193	217	266	172	1276
	Sun Kuang-min (TPE)	190	257	234	198	175	161	1215
	Hussain Nasir Al-Suwaidi (UAE)	217	192	201	205	184	156	1155
	Sergey Sapov (UZB)	0	0	0	0	0	0	0
