= Bowling at the 2010 Asian Games – Men's singles =

Men's singles at the 2010 Asian Games
- Venue: Tianhe Bowling Hall
- Date: 15 November 2010
- Competitors: 101 from 17 nations

Medalists
gold medal	Biboy Rivera	Philippines
silver medal	Mohammad Al-Regeebah	Athletes from Kuwait
bronze medal	Frederick Ong	Philippines

The men's singles competition at the 2010 Asian Games in Guangzhou was held on 15 November 2010 at Tianhe Bowling Hall.

== Schedule ==
All times are China Standard Time (UTC+08:00)

Date	Time	Event
Monday, 15 November 2010	09:00	Squad A
Monday, 15 November 2010	14:30	Squad B

== Results ==
Rank	Athlete	Game						Total
Rank	Athlete	1	2	3	4	5	6	Total
1st place, gold medalist(s)	Biboy Rivera (PHI)	256	196	233	225	239	265	1414
2nd place, silver medalist(s)	Mohammad Al-Regeebah (IOC)	265	247	233	279	194	186	1404
3rd place, bronze medalist(s)	Frederick Ong (PHI)	236	248	246	199	226	235	1390
4	Kao Hai-yuan (TPE)	237	219	254	223	220	223	1376
5	Choi Yong-kyu (KOR)	207	259	247	245	197	215	1370
6	Jasem Al-Saqer (IOC)	265	189	258	201	227	226	1366
7	Jang Dong-chul (KOR)	218	215	175	279	243	235	1365
8	Ryan Leonard Lalisang (INA)	196	229	259	237	225	217	1363
9	Somjed Kusonphithak (THA)	236	267	268	213	186	191	1361
10	Alex Liew (MAS)	216	213	248	197	266	214	1354
11	Michael Mak (HKG)	229	258	204	225	203	226	1345
12	Aaron Kong (MAS)	236	227	181	213	223	259	1339
13	Khaled Al-Debayyan (IOC)	237	215	245	223	169	245	1334
13	Remy Ong (SIN)	182	242	235	235	203	237	1334
15	Rakan Al-Ameeri (IOC)	215	279	191	215	195	234	1329
16	Eric Tseng (HKG)	214	215	247	289	188	175	1328
17	Shogo Wada (JPN)	204	178	226	183	279	255	1325
18	Ng Tiac Pin (SIN)	223	214	238	256	216	176	1323
19	Nayef Eqab (UAE)	227	201	208	227	238	214	1315
20	Choi Bok-eum (KOR)	227	203	209	256	258	160	1313
21	Cho Young-seon (KOR)	213	185	236	258	228	192	1312
22	Mohd Nur Aiman (MAS)	223	187	237	218	214	215	1294
23	Syafiq Ridhwan (MAS)	225	246	188	210	194	224	1287
23	Adrian Ang (MAS)	213	226	190	246	213	199	1287
25	Shaker Ali Al-Hassan (UAE)	268	214	158	226	248	172	1286
26	Tomoyuki Sasaki (JPN)	211	254	186	206	228	198	1283
27	Suh Sang-cheon (KOR)	224	225	206	207	225	195	1282
28	Yang Nien-hua (TPE)	235	210	166	217	227	226	1281
29	Jason Yeong-Nathan (SIN)	224	235	234	174	206	207	1280
30	Toshihiko Takahashi (JPN)	182	229	258	211	172	226	1278
31	Mohammad Al-Zaidan (IOC)	256	234	259	177	180	167	1273
32	Basil Low (SIN)	163	167	186	242	265	246	1269
33	Du Jianchao (CHN)	200	189	192	217	222	237	1257
33	Mohammed Al-Qubaisi (UAE)	219	230	206	236	154	212	1257
33	Mahmood Al-Attar (UAE)	200	195	186	236	212	228	1257
36	Cyrus Cheung (HKG)	203	213	224	182	204	223	1249
37	Wang Tien-fu (TPE)	207	159	245	228	223	182	1244
38	Basel Al-Anzi (IOC)	212	246	236	161	204	184	1243
39	Rangga Dwichandra Yudhira (INA)	202	202	216	238	191	191	1240
39	Dhruv Sarda (IND)	241	169	171	225	241	193	1240
41	Cheng Hsing-chao (TPE)	148	205	224	222	227	213	1239
41	Hong Hae-sol (KOR)	223	157	213	235	189	222	1239
43	Mansour Al-Awami (QAT)	217	213	201	230	168	204	1233
44	Yannaphon Larpapharat (THA)	196	178	213	215	221	202	1225
45	Wicky Yeung (HKG)	206	227	171	203	200	214	1221
46	Sun Kuang-min (TPE)	246	222	154	191	223	180	1216
46	Hussain Nasir Al-Suwaidi (UAE)	203	224	188	221	170	210	1216
46	Zulmazran Zulkifli (MAS)	211	171	210	207	193	224	1216
49	Michael Tsang (HKG)	144	210	187	213	191	268	1213
50	Masaaki Takemoto (JPN)	183	223	164	216	198	228	1212
51	Badin Lerdpiriyasakulkit (THA)	197	201	224	182	226	180	1210
52	Nobuhito Fuji (JPN)	212	193	183	234	183	204	1209
53	Raoul Miranda (PHI)	195	214	187	226	214	170	1206
54	Girish Ashok Gaba (IND)	181	179	212	230	197	206	1205
55	Salem Al-Marzouqi (QAT)	201	156	198	207	206	235	1203
56	Chester King (PHI)	171	213	192	220	198	206	1200
57	Srinath Pobbathi (IND)	189	234	198	203	193	182	1199
58	Zhang Yijia (CHN)	225	204	188	164	192	225	1198
59	Lee Tak Man (MAC)	236	158	209	194	184	216	1197
60	Abdulla Al-Jusaiman (QAT)	200	214	207	158	203	212	1194
61	Benshir Layoso (PHI)	185	181	212	160	220	235	1193
61	Yeri Ramadona (INA)	182	186	171	168	240	246	1193
63	Zhang Peng (CHN)	197	236	211	188	163	197	1192
63	Mi Zhongli (CHN)	199	195	216	188	189	205	1192
65	Sayed Ibrahim Al-Hashemi (UAE)	215	205	163	227	203	177	1190
66	Tomokatsu Yamashita (JPN)	167	227	217	166	179	233	1189
67	Wu Siu Hong (HKG)	200	205	192	184	157	248	1186
68	Tam Tsz Sun (MAC)	197	191	201	222	142	225	1178
69	Apiwich Watanaphongsakorn (THA)	204	205	181	178	203	205	1176
70	Pan Yuehong (CHN)	178	187	225	227	191	166	1174
71	Mubarak Al-Merikhi (QAT)	198	215	173	198	173	214	1171
72	Phoemphun Yakasem (THA)	205	180	208	144	221	212	1170
73	Choi Io Fai (MAC)	200	206	215	192	192	159	1164
74	Lok Hei Ieong (MAC)	208	191	196	205	180	182	1162
75	Mark Wong (SIN)	161	213	147	182	217	235	1155
76	Dilbir Singh (IND)	168	174	234	198	180	180	1134
77	Fahad Al-Emadi (QAT)	194	200	204	211	177	146	1132
78	Fang Chih-nan (TPE)	196	182	230	166	179	178	1131
79	Dechochai Tinjiratip (THA)	211	196	157	215	167	181	1127
80	Hengki Susanto (INA)	228	197	172	170	218	137	1122
81	William Widjaja (INA)	179	149	204	200	184	203	1119
82	Jose Collins (PHI)	185	197	216	165	159	187	1109
83	Sergey Sapov (UZB)	154	181	183	172	224	194	1108
84	Yousef Al-Jaber (QAT)	192	152	258	150	176	173	1101
85	Sharyn Baatar (MGL)	196	212	156	178	185	173	1100
86	Jose Manuel Machon (MAC)	253	168	167	187	150	167	1092
87	Benjamin Lim (SIN)	195	178	162	167	205	181	1088
88	Akaash Ashok Kumar (IND)	159	144	213	178	215	170	1079
89	Shabbir Dhankot (IND)	238	179	167	125	155	214	1078
90	Kot Ka Hou (MAC)	191	180	137	215	202	140	1065
91	Viktor Smirnov (UZB)	232	142	165	196	165	163	1063
92	Fayzulla Nasirov (UZB)	163	178	158	151	199	169	1018
93	Dondovyn Zorigt (MGL)	162	158	141	198	199	154	1012
94	Bakhodir Arifov (UZB)	152	156	189	177	158	163	995
95	Miyesengyn Tüvshinsanaa (MGL)	149	144	168	185	191	148	985
96	Kudrat Khilyamov (UZB)	135	151	162	201	156	174	979
97	Surat Makhkamov (UZB)	209	168	161	147	143	149	977
98	Tsog-Erdeniin Molor (MGL)	187	174	162	132	156	133	944
99	Jamtsyn Sodnomdorj (MGL)	152	169	157	140	124	185	927
100	Diwan Rezaldy (INA)	171	154	161	128	138	164	916
101	Tsendkhüügiin Batjargal (MGL)	103	124	131	128	116	148	750
