= Bowling at the 2010 Asian Games – Men's trios =

Men's trios at the 2010 Asian Games
- Venue: Tianhe Bowling Hall
- Date: 19–20 November 2010
- Competitors: 99 from 17 nations

Medalists
gold medal	South Korea; Choi Yong-kyu, Jang Dong-chul, Choi Bok-eum
silver medal	South Korea; Suh Sang-cheon, Cho Young-seon, Hong Hae-sol
bronze medal	Qatar; Mansour Al-Awami, Mubarak Al-Merikhi, Fahad Al-Emadi

The men's trios competition at the 2010 Asian Games in Guangzhou was held on 19 and 20 November 2010 at Tianhe Bowling Hall.

== Schedule ==
All times are China Standard Time (UTC+08:00)

Date	Time	Event
Friday, 19 November 2010	09:00	First block
Saturday, 20 November 2010	09:00	Second block

== Results ==
Rank	Team	Game						Total
Rank	Team	1	2	3	4	5	6	Total
1st place, gold medalist(s)	South Korea 2 (KOR)	680	770	603	644	657	707	4061
	Choi Yong-kyu	272	269	195	246	237	214	1433
	Jang Dong-chul	234	248	205	191	192	237	1307
	Choi Bok-eum	174	253	203	207	228	256	1321
2nd place, silver medalist(s)	South Korea 1 (KOR)	654	662	668	671	678	619	3952
	Suh Sang-cheon	225	234	227	214	206	212	1318
	Cho Young-seon	193	225	236	221	245	159	1279
	Hong Hae-sol	236	203	205	236	227	248	1355
3rd place, bronze medalist(s)	Qatar 1 (QAT)	699	666	618	704	544	677	3908
	Mansour Al-Awami	238	225	161	268	212	237	1341
	Mubarak Al-Merikhi	224	245	221	245	178	210	1323
	Fahad Al-Emadi	237	196	236	191	154	230	1244
4	China 1 (CHN)	656	689	565	659	588	696	3853
	Zhang Peng	216	254	182	221	175	210	1258
	Zhang Yijia	214	199	190	197	226	199	1225
	Mi Zhongli	226	236	193	241	187	287	1370
5	Hong Kong 1 (HKG)	741	590	632	659	604	623	3849
	Wu Siu Hong	216	176	211	196	168	171	1138
	Eric Tseng	275	210	194	226	256	213	1374
	Michael Mak	250	204	227	237	180	239	1337
6	Malaysia 1 (MAS)	658	609	586	679	656	658	3846
	Aaron Kong	224	203	192	243	190	226	1278
	Adrian Ang	226	193	202	212	231	174	1238
	Alex Liew	208	213	192	224	235	258	1330
7	Japan 2 (JPN)	571	623	648	751	601	640	3834
	Toshihiko Takahashi	197	207	231	246	196	220	1297
	Tomokatsu Yamashita	210	200	213	259	234	261	1377
	Masaaki Takemoto	164	216	204	246	171	159	1160
8	Chinese Taipei 1 (TPE)	740	604	602	612	665	606	3829
	Kao Hai-yuan	225	235	235	212	212	238	1357
	Wang Tien-fu	269	211	175	196	194	177	1222
	Yang Nien-hua	246	158	192	204	259	191	1250
9	Malaysia 2 (MAS)	602	613	662	666	559	674	3776
	Syafiq Ridhwan	203	225	238	234	204	229	1333
	Mohd Nur Aiman	198	178	220	226	182	236	1240
	Zulmazran Zulkifli	201	210	204	206	173	209	1203
10	Philippines 1 (PHI)	667	582	651	540	644	669	3753
	Chester King	213	212	155	180	202	265	1227
	Frederick Ong	241	145	258	168	256	191	1259
	Biboy Rivera	213	225	238	192	186	213	1267
11	Thailand 2 (THA)	655	602	657	581	617	637	3749
	Phoemphun Yakasem	206	203	245	159	174	186	1173
	Yannaphon Larpapharat	224	167	210	233	227	214	1275
	Somjed Kusonphithak	225	232	202	189	216	237	1301
12	United Arab Emirates 1 (UAE)	606	654	590	592	626	628	3696
	Shaker Ali Al-Hassan	199	170	206	186	195	202	1158
	Nayef Eqab	224	225	204	191	196	172	1212
	Mohammed Al-Qubaisi	183	259	180	215	235	254	1326
13	Singapore 1 (SIN)	575	643	560	648	652	615	3693
	Basil Low	204	199	159	225	232	173	1192
	Remy Ong	201	207	228	184	198	224	1242
	Jason Yeong-Nathan	170	237	173	239	222	218	1259
14	Indonesia 1 (INA)	672	589	644	589	593	601	3688
	Ryan Leonard Lalisang	204	172	209	212	204	223	1224
	Hengki Susanto	214	181	257	188	200	197	1237
	Rangga Dwichandra Yudhira	254	236	178	189	189	181	1227
15	Japan 1 (JPN)	667	630	552	604	603	593	3649
	Tomoyuki Sasaki	214	210	183	226	202	180	1215
	Nobuhito Fuji	217	205	188	224	195	192	1221
	Shogo Wada	236	215	181	154	206	221	1213
16	Athletes from Kuwait 1 (IOC)	675	588	567	624	599	587	3640
	Mohammad Al-Zaidan	249	218	156	204	195	192	1214
	Rakan Al-Ameeri	212	199	211	170	201	201	1194
	Khaled Al-Debayyan	214	171	200	250	203	194	1232
17	Chinese Taipei 2 (TPE)	625	633	573	554	609	637	3631
	Fang Chih-nan	196	212	187	150	225	213	1183
	Cheng Hsing-chao	202	227	197	186	215	243	1270
	Sun Kuang-min	227	194	189	218	169	181	1178
18	United Arab Emirates 2 (UAE)	630	628	621	625	613	504	3621
	Sayed Ibrahim Al-Hashemi	161	202	225	234	203	204	1229
	Hussain Nasir Al-Suwaidi	234	221	187	187	182	153	1164
	Mahmood Al-Attar	235	205	209	204	228	147	1228
19	Singapore 2 (SIN)	596	591	618	605	605	605	3620
	Benjamin Lim	217	198	235	202	222	201	1275
	Mark Wong	192	204	158	201	198	255	1208
	Ng Tiac Pin	187	189	225	202	185	149	1137
20	Philippines 2 (PHI)	578	543	615	612	642	616	3606
	Jose Collins	179	152	189	200	204	199	1123
	Benshir Layoso	201	176	186	229	148	193	1133
	Raoul Miranda	198	215	240	183	290	224	1350
21	Hong Kong 2 (HKG)	604	576	628	576	612	607	3603
	Cyrus Cheung	197	175	198	184	192	212	1158
	Wicky Yeung	178	188	222	223	206	174	1191
	Michael Tsang	229	213	208	169	214	221	1254
22	Athletes from Kuwait 2 (IOC)	551	679	558	610	597	588	3583
	Mohammad Al-Regeebah	202	229	190	204	200	216	1241
	Jasem Al-Saqer	169	235	197	161	212	139	1113
	Basel Al-Anzi	180	215	171	245	185	233	1229
23	India 2 (IND)	633	612	575	548	591	598	3557
	Shabbir Dhankot	247	174	208	168	205	199	1201
	Dhruv Sarda	194	254	181	154	247	175	1205
	Srinath Pobbathi	192	184	186	226	139	224	1151
24	Indonesia 2 (INA)	605	590	605	538	598	581	3517
	William Widjaja	175	192	215	160	213	183	1138
	Diwan Rezaldy	213	166	199	204	179	161	1122
	Yeri Ramadona	217	232	191	174	206	237	1257
25	Thailand 1 (THA)	617	568	661	508	502	555	3411
	Badin Lerdpiriyasakulkit	199	233	234	170	165	224	1225
	Dechochai Tinjiratip	202	157	243	165	153	141	1061
	Apiwich Watanaphongsakorn	216	178	184	173	184	190	1125
26	Qatar 2 (QAT)	607	567	560	473	584	584	3375
	Yousef Al-Jaber	195	180	221	152	193	213	1154
	Salem Al-Marzouqi	215	182	156	170	202	200	1125
	Abdulla Al-Jusaiman	197	205	183	151	189	171	1096
27	India 1 (IND)	499	582	534	521	574	652	3362
	Dilbir Singh	152	209	140	171	189	206	1067
	Akaash Ashok Kumar	167	172	179	159	183	234	1094
	Girish Ashok Gaba	180	201	215	191	202	212	1201
28	Macau 2 (MAC)	562	536	531	621	590	520	3360
	Jose Manuel Machon	184	171	156	199	225	152	1087
	Lok Hei Ieong	188	194	149	199	167	179	1076
	Tam Tsz Sun	190	171	226	223	198	189	1197
28	Macau 1 (MAC)	524	652	586	518	472	608	3360
	Choi Io Fai	164	256	224	161	162	183	1150
	Lee Tak Man	181	184	136	163	148	216	1028
	Kot Ka Hou	179	212	226	194	162	209	1182
30	Uzbekistan 1 (UZB)	535	525	583	550	511	552	3256
	Sergey Sapov	161	188	201	164	191	199	1104
	Kudrat Khilyamov	172	159	197	205	154	185	1072
	Surat Makhkamov	202	178	185	181	166	168	1080
31	Uzbekistan 2 (UZB)	555	555	513	550	466	488	3127
	Viktor Smirnov	167	199	170	157	143	131	967
	Bakhodir Arifov	209	196	154	215	131	181	1086
	Fayzulla Nasirov	179	160	189	178	192	176	1074
32	Mongolia 2 (MGL)	559	542	498	547	455	494	3095
	Sharyn Baatar	189	202	161	216	166	201	1135
	Miyesengyn Tüvshinsanaa	213	182	166	163	155	155	1034
	Dondovyn Zorigt	157	158	171	168	134	138	926
33	Mongolia 1 (MGL)	458	469	463	436	442	470	2738
	Tsog-Erdeniin Molor	171	174	114	161	144	127	891
	Jamtsyn Sodnomdorj	129	165	179	136	157	179	945
	Tsendkhüügiin Batjargal	158	130	170	139	141	164	902
Individuals
	Du Jianchao (CHN)	247	222	227	234	231	257	1418
	Pan Yuehong (CHN)	183	223	191	181	183	181	1142
