= Bowling at the 2010 Asian Games – Men's doubles =

Event at 2010 Asian Games

Men's doubles at the 2010 Asian Games
- Venue: Tianhe Bowling Hall
- Date: 17 November 2010
- Competitors: 100 from 17 nations

Medalists
gold medal	Adrian Ang; Alex Liew	Malaysia
silver medal	Tomokatsu Yamashita; Shogo Wada	Japan
silver medal	Remy Ong; Jason Yeong-Nathan	Singapore

The men's doubles competition at the 2010 Asian Games in Guangzhou was held on 17 November 2010 at Tianhe Bowling Hall.

== Schedule ==
All times are China Standard Time (UTC+08:00)

Date	Time	Event
Wednesday, 17 November 2010	09:00	Squad A
Wednesday, 17 November 2010	14:30	Squad B

== Results ==
Rank	Team	Game						Total
Rank	Team	1	2	3	4	5	6	Total
1st place, gold medalist(s)	Malaysia 2 (MAS)	466	450	426	459	470	440	2711
	Adrian Ang	255	233	213	247	228	196	1372
	Alex Liew	211	217	213	212	242	244	1339
2nd place, silver medalist(s)	Japan 2 (JPN)	379	445	491	399	515	462	2691
	Tomokatsu Yamashita	177	218	222	213	258	224	1312
	Shogo Wada	202	227	269	186	257	238	1379
2nd place, silver medalist(s)	Singapore 3 (SIN)	441	478	492	436	405	439	2691
	Remy Ong	238	232	280	190	169	181	1290
	Jason Yeong-Nathan	203	246	212	246	236	258	1401
4	South Korea 2 (KOR)	423	503	398	442	438	479	2683
	Jang Dong-chul	178	235	175	235	180	247	1250
	Choi Bok-eum	245	268	223	207	258	232	1433
5	Thailand 2 (THA)	446	486	422	427	466	415	2662
	Phoemphun Yakasem	232	268	213	234	279	226	1452
	Dechochai Tinjiratip	214	218	209	193	187	189	1210
6	China 2 (CHN)	456	495	428	427	418	398	2622
	Zhang Peng	269	268	225	212	234	206	1414
	Du Jianchao	187	227	203	215	184	192	1208
7	Indonesia 1 (INA)	452	459	435	431	430	400	2607
	Ryan Leonard Lalisang	268	253	248	209	246	215	1439
	Rangga Dwichandra Yudhira	184	206	187	222	184	185	1168
8	South Korea 3 (KOR)	384	418	421	429	502	448	2602
	Choi Yong-kyu	192	192	224	195	259	257	1319
	Cho Young-seon	192	226	197	234	243	191	1283
9	China 1 (CHN)	458	428	515	392	371	434	2598
	Zhang Yijia	212	246	258	177	149	200	1242
	Mi Zhongli	246	182	257	215	222	234	1356
10	Thailand 3 (THA)	447	394	448	401	443	447	2580
	Yannaphon Larpapharat	233	171	248	235	237	223	1347
	Somjed Kusonphithak	214	223	200	166	206	224	1233
11	Hong Kong 1 (HKG)	455	434	432	372	412	465	2570
	Wicky Yeung	228	210	185	199	190	251	1263
	Michael Tsang	227	224	247	173	222	214	1307
12	Qatar 1 (QAT)	494	393	471	385	434	390	2567
	Mubarak Al-Merikhi	237	190	232	182	229	201	1271
	Fahad Al-Emadi	257	203	239	203	205	189	1296
12	Japan 3 (JPN)	418	389	443	434	411	472	2567
	Tomoyuki Sasaki	224	218	244	225	184	249	1344
	Nobuhito Fuji	194	171	199	209	227	223	1223
14	Japan 1 (JPN)	395	439	345	420	503	447	2549
	Toshihiko Takahashi	225	257	172	189	235	224	1302
	Masaaki Takemoto	170	182	173	231	268	223	1247
15	Athletes from Kuwait 3 (IOC)	385	457	438	420	438	398	2536
	Basel Al-Anzi	204	222	256	194	238	200	1314
	Rakan Al-Ameeri	181	235	182	226	200	198	1222
16	Indonesia 2 (INA)	423	472	397	390	436	400	2518
	Hengki Susanto	225	248	206	183	191	188	1241
	Yeri Ramadona	198	224	191	207	245	212	1277
17	United Arab Emirates 3 (UAE)	432	335	436	404	430	477	2514
	Shaker Ali Al-Hassan	214	178	214	219	233	221	1279
	Mohammed Al-Qubaisi	218	157	222	185	197	256	1235
18	Chinese Taipei 2 (TPE)	383	399	427	413	427	461	2510
	Kao Hai-yuan	200	204	179	186	257	216	1242
	Yang Nien-hua	183	195	248	227	170	245	1268
19	Hong Kong 3 (HKG)	411	441	396	435	447	368	2498
	Wu Siu Hong	208	224	174	211	255	192	1264
	Michael Mak	203	217	222	224	192	176	1234
20	Indonesia 3 (INA)	395	408	436	415	437	401	2492
	William Widjaja	174	188	206	245	212	182	1207
	Diwan Rezaldy	221	220	230	170	225	219	1285
21	United Arab Emirates 2 (UAE)	447	441	335	489	401	368	2481
	Nayef Eqab	245	238	188	221	208	154	1254
	Mahmood Al-Attar	202	203	147	268	193	214	1227
22	Athletes from Kuwait 2 (IOC)	415	348	481	408	394	423	2469
	Jasem Al-Saqer	225	180	278	215	208	245	1351
	Khaled Al-Debayyan	190	168	203	193	186	178	1118
23	Malaysia 1 (MAS)	410	409	352	385	483	428	2467
	Aaron Kong	183	206	168	237	249	203	1246
	Zulmazran Zulkifli	227	203	184	148	234	225	1221
24	Chinese Taipei 3 (TPE)	424	416	402	377	457	387	2463
	Wang Tien-fu	223	192	225	193	266	173	1272
	Cheng Hsing-chao	201	224	177	184	191	214	1191
25	Hong Kong 2 (HKG)	510	385	409	357	444	352	2457
	Cyrus Cheung	245	190	201	158	210	188	1192
	Eric Tseng	265	195	208	199	234	164	1265
26	Singapore 2 (SIN)	397	367	336	431	458	467	2456
	Benjamin Lim	226	186	189	194	231	229	1255
	Mark Wong	171	181	147	237	227	238	1201
27	Philippines 3 (PHI)	416	381	349	444	438	427	2455
	Frederick Ong	188	224	147	209	197	213	1178
	Biboy Rivera	228	157	202	235	241	214	1277
28	United Arab Emirates 1 (UAE)	477	382	395	392	447	361	2454
	Sayed Ibrahim Al-Hashemi	199	206	221	215	232	184	1257
	Hussain Nasir Al-Suwaidi	278	176	174	177	215	177	1197
29	Chinese Taipei 1 (TPE)	379	396	443	365	453	400	2436
	Fang Chih-nan	193	196	205	177	267	215	1253
	Sun Kuang-min	186	200	238	188	186	185	1183
30	Philippines 1 (PHI)	337	400	448	408	430	408	2431
	Chester King	172	177	234	225	216	215	1239
	Raoul Miranda	165	223	214	183	214	193	1192
31	Malaysia 3 (MAS)	390	388	445	379	407	411	2420
	Syafiq Ridhwan	197	204	212	191	203	194	1201
	Mohd Nur Aiman	193	184	233	188	204	217	1219
32	India 1 (IND)	363	450	416	371	363	451	2414
	Dilbir Singh	183	217	222	177	160	234	1193
	Akaash Ashok Kumar	180	233	194	194	203	217	1221
33	South Korea 3 (KOR)	428	361	395	364	387	460	2395
	Suh Sang-cheon	248	181	203	193	170	255	1250
	Hong Hae-sol	180	180	192	171	217	205	1145
34	Qatar 3 (QAT)	382	455	408	371	435	339	2390
	Yousef Al-Jaber	177	211	183	190	235	148	1144
	Mansour Al-Awami	205	244	225	181	200	191	1246
35	Philippines 2 (PHI)	328	407	397	373	438	407	2350
	Jose Collins	159	191	197	193	204	204	1148
	Benshir Layoso	169	216	200	180	234	203	1202
36	Thailand 1 (THA)	383	373	375	433	381	373	2318
	Badin Lerdpiriyasakulkit	182	205	202	228	195	189	1201
	Apiwich Watanaphongsakorn	201	168	173	205	186	184	1117
37	Macau 3 (MAC)	391	452	336	337	374	427	2317
	Choi Io Fai	200	205	202	166	216	205	1194
	Lee Tak Man	191	247	134	171	158	222	1123
38	Athletes from Kuwait 1 (IOC)	375	360	377	446	416	342	2316
	Mohammad Al-Regeebah	197	171	199	235	214	175	1191
	Mohammad Al-Zaidan	189	178	211	202	167	1125	
39	Singapore 1 (SIN)	388	342	323	472	383	399	2307
	Basil Low	228	177	199	288	201	226	1319
	Ng Tiac Pin	160	165	124	184	182	173	988
40	Qatar 3 (QAT)	414	389	330	444	360	349	2286
	Salem Al-Marzouqi	210	204	178	224	167	215	1198
	Abdulla Al-Jusaiman	204	185	152	220	193	134	1088
41	India 3 (IND)	382	350	424	338	401	373	2268
	Srinath Pobbathi	171	179	200	145	193	191	1079
	Girish Ashok Gaba	211	171	224	193	208	182	1189
42	Macau 2 (MAC)	321	378	377	369	392	410	2247
	Lok Hei Ieong	168	183	195	171	195	208	1120
	Tam Tsz Sun	153	195	182	198	197	202	1127
43	India 2 (IND)	378	376	371	378	402	313	2218
	Shabbir Dhankot	179	207	212	180	186	144	1108
	Dhruv Sarda	199	169	159	198	216	169	1110
44	Macau 1 (MAC)	394	389	407	349	353	325	2217
	Jose Manuel Machon	223	182	208	161	162	133	1069
	Kot Ka Hou	171	207	199	188	191	192	1148
45	Uzbekistan 2 (UZB)	338	330	359	361	376	336	2100
	Bakhodir Arifov	172	174	168	171	176	141	1002
	Fayzulla Nasirov	166	156	191	190	200	195	1098
46	Uzbekistan 1 (UZB)	296	347	371	376	365	327	2082
	Sergey Sapov	148	166	187	197	179	159	1036
	Viktor Smirnov	148	181	184	179	186	168	1046
47	Mongolia 2 (MGL)	319	374	437	270	316	308	2024
	Sharyn Baatar	160	187	192	130	159	157	985
	Miyesengyn Tüvshinsanaa	159	187	245	140	157	151	1039
48	Mongolia 1 (MGL)	354	310	322	335	309	310	1940
	Tsog-Erdeniin Molor	153	154	132	189	161	139	928
	Dondovyn Zorigt	201	156	190	146	148	171	1012
49	Uzbekistan 3 (UZB)	298	375	309	335	264	317	1898
	Kudrat Khilyamov	117	203	138	168	137	118	881
	Surat Makhkamov	181	172	171	167	127	199	1017
50	Mongolia 3 (MGL)	322	343	262	285	265	319	1796
	Jamtsyn Sodnomdorj	181	190	126	151	142	150	940
	Tsendkhüügiin Batjargal	141	153	136	134	123	169	856
Individuals
	Pan Yuehong (CHN)	236	202	210	206	178	172	1204
