= Bowling at the 2010 Asian Games – Men's masters =

Men's masters at the 2010 Asian Games
- Venue: Tianhe Bowling Hall
- Date: 23–24 November 2010
- Competitors: 16 from 11 nations

Medalists
gold medal	Choi Bok-eum	South Korea
silver medal	Mohammad Al-Regeebah	Athletes from Kuwait
bronze medal	Du Jianchao	China

The men's masters competition at the 2010 Asian Games in Guangzhou was held from 23 November to 24 November 2010 at Tianhe Bowling Hall.

The Masters event comprises the top 16 bowlers (maximum two per country) from the all-events competition.

== Schedule ==
All times are China Standard Time (UTC+08:00)

Date	Time	Event
Tuesday, 23 November 2010	09:00	First block
Wednesday, 24 November 2010	09:00	Second block
Wednesday, 24 November 2010	16:55	Stepladder 2nd/3rd place
Wednesday, 24 November 2010	17:40	Stepladder 1st/2nd place

== Results ==
=== Preliminary ===
Rank	Athlete	Game																Total
Rank	Athlete	1	2	3	4	5	6	7	8	9	10	11	12	13	14	15	16	Total
1	Choi Bok-eum (KOR)	254; 10	206; 10	203; 0	249; 10	211; 0	225; 10	245; 10	200; 0	210; 10	300; 10	257; 10	224; 0	243; 10	226; 10	228; 10	222; 10	3823
2	Du Jianchao (CHN)	209; 10	235; 10	213; 10	171; 0	247; 10	196; 0	278; 10	229; 10	263; 10	258; 10	247; 10	213; 10	173; 0	223; 10	264; 10	191; 0	3730
3	Mohammad Al-Regeebah (IOC)	213; 0	200; 0	247; 10	214; 0	192; 0	209; 10	245; 10	258; 10	161; 0	216; 10	199; 0	248; 10	247; 10	233; 10	267; 10	224; 10	3673
4	Yannaphon Larpapharat (THA)	254; 10	223; 10	233; 0	257; 10	203; 10	233; 10	227; 10	266; 10	197; 10	279; 10	237; 0	157; 0	217; 10	208; 10	189; 0	176; 0	3666
5	Alex Liew (MAS)	178; 0	168; 0	288; 10	194; 10	269; 10	169; 0	204; 0	214; 0	213; 0	259; 0	199; 0	220; 10	227; 0	289; 10	278; 10	216; 10	3655
6	Choi Yong-kyu (KOR)	216; 0	202; 10	215; 10	236; 10	266; 10	203; 10	248; 10	184; 0	257; 10	243; 10	213; 10	178; 0	231; 10	185; 0	203; 10	214; 0	3604
7	Biboy Rivera (PHI)	225; 10	237; 10	217; 10	231; 10	220; 0	197; 0	233; 0	242; 10	184; 0	221; 0	245; 10	205; 0	203; 0	234; 10	166; 0	206; 10	3546
8	Ryan Leonard Lalisang (INA)	205; 0	249; 10	182; 0	193; 10	166; 0	234; 10	213; 0	245; 10	215; 0	155; 0	206; 0	246; 10	234; 0	229; 10	214; 0	236; 10	3492
9	Mi Zhongli (CHN)	197; 0	232; 5	219; 10	201; 0	226; 10	192; 10	178; 0	192; 10	171; 0	234; 10	217; 10	200; 10	225; 0	218; 0	269; 10	198; 0	3454
10	Toshihiko Takahashi (JPN)	207; 10	228; 0	163; 0	200; 10	246; 0	209; 0	206; 10	202; 0	206; 10	212; 0	150; 0	213; 10	268; 10	247; 10	178; 0	199; 0	3404
11	Jason Yeong-Nathan (SIN)	246; 0	223; 10	176; 0	193; 0	193; 0	213; 0	258; 10	186; 0	214; 0	257; 0	199; 10	181; 0	179; 0	212; 0	232; 0	170; 10	3372
12	Mansour Al-Awami (QAT)	236; 10	190; 0	179; 0	185; 0	215; 10	230; 10	193; 0	215; 0	171; 0	172; 10	193; 0	205; 0	246; 10	254; 0	200; 0	204; 10	3348
13	Aaron Kong (MAS)	197; 10	190; 0	170; 0	193; 0	215; 0	202; 0	211; 0	226; 10	247; 10	162; 0	212; 10	215; 10	203; 0	225; 0	223; 0	194; 0	3335
14	Shogo Wada (JPN)	187; 0	232; 5	178; 0	180; 0	178; 0	207; 10	223; 0	225; 10	182; 10	204; 10	193; 0	187; 10	242; 10	214; 0	233; 0	179; 10	3319
15	Eric Tseng (HKG)	223; 10	186; 0	242; 10	207; 10	212; 10	201; 0	206; 10	212; 0	215; 0	159; 0	204; 0	144; 0	247; 10	197; 0	224; 10	161; 0	3310
16	Michael Mak (HKG)	207; 0	218; 0	213; 10	237; 0	227; 10	157; 0	178; 0	170; 0	235; 10	169; 0	195; 10	210; 0	203; 0	162; 0	241; 10	165; 0	3237

=== Stepladder finals ===
Stepladder 2nd/3rd place			Stepladder 1st/2nd place
			1	Choi Bok-eum (KOR)	217	245	462
2	Du Jianchao (CHN)	208	3	Mohammad Al-Regeebah (IOC)	154	173	327
3	Mohammad Al-Regeebah (IOC)	215
