= Bowling at the 2010 Asian Games – Women's doubles =

Women's doubles at the 2010 Asian Games
- Venue: Tianhe Bowling Hall
- Date: 18 November 2010
- Competitors: 74 from 14 nations

Medalists
gold medal	Choi Jin-a; Gang Hye-eun	South Korea
silver medal	Hong Su-yeon; Son Yun-hee	South Korea
bronze medal	Zhang Yuhong; Yang Suiling	China

The women's doubles competition at the 2010 Asian Games in Guangzhou was held on 18 November 2010 at Tianhe Bowling Hall.

== Schedule ==
All times are China Standard Time (UTC+08:00)

Date	Time	Event
Thursday, 18 November 2010	09:00	Squad A
Thursday, 18 November 2010	14:30	Squad B

== Results ==
Rank	Team	Game						Total
Rank	Team	1	2	3	4	5	6	Total
1st place, gold medalist(s)	South Korea 1 (KOR)	452	445	445	481	463	401	2687
	Choi Jin-a	258	237	227	257	227	190	1396
	Gang Hye-eun	194	208	218	224	236	211	1291
2nd place, silver medalist(s)	South Korea 3 (KOR)	447	468	403	409	487	450	2664
	Hong Su-yeon	209	227	194	202	231	204	1267
	Son Yun-hee	238	241	209	207	256	246	1397
3	South Korea 2 (KOR)	462	448	404	408	440	441	2603
	Hwang Sun-ok	247	248	210	210	195	259	1369
	Jeon Eun-hee	215	200	194	198	245	182	1234
3rd place, bronze medalist(s)	China 2 (CHN)	427	477	456	388	415	430	2593
	Zhang Yuhong	200	248	245	195	202	234	1324
	Yang Suiling	227	229	211	193	213	196	1269
5	Philippines 3 (PHI)	386	429	393	466	462	448	2584
	Liza Clutario	206	206	195	230	204	232	1273
	Liza del Rosario	180	223	198	236	258	216	1311
6	Japan 1 (JPN)	502	403	439	416	405	415	2580
	Misaki Mukotani	257	198	248	193	190	224	1310
	Kanako Ishimine	245	205	191	223	215	191	1270
7	Singapore 1 (SIN)	428	400	404	397	488	418	2535
	Cherie Tan	195	195	193	192	236	222	1233
	Geraldine Ng	233	205	211	205	252	196	1302
8	Chinese Taipei 3 (TPE)	474	458	407	405	385	385	2514
	Wang Yu-ling	197	203	204	204	201	183	1192
	Tang Ya-chun	277	255	203	201	184	202	1322
9	Singapore 2 (SIN)	438	327	430	458	454	381	2488
	Jasmine Yeong-Nathan	213	147	236	245	206	186	1233
	Jazreel Tan	225	180	194	213	248	195	1255
10	Thailand 2 (THA)	455	380	463	407	387	380	2472
	Angkana Netrviseth	223	221	230	224	232	190	1320
	Benchawan Poungthong	232	159	233	183	155	190	1152
11	Philippines 2 (PHI)	404	347	399	429	422	468	2469
	Kimberly Lao	168	171	227	232	177	243	1218
	Krizziah Tabora	236	176	172	197	245	225	1251
12	Indonesia 1 (INA)	446	456	396	393	317	457	2465
	Putty Armein	225	219	185	191	169	211	1200
	Tannya Roumimper	221	237	211	202	148	246	1265
13	Malaysia 3 (MAS)	449	416	406	421	388	352	2432
	Esther Cheah	215	213	222	189	180	168	1187
	Shalin Zulkifli	234	203	184	232	208	184	1245
14	Malaysia 2 (MAS)	388	392	442	372	419	415	2428
	Sharon Koh	204	209	227	152	225	207	1224
	Zatil Iman	184	183	215	220	194	208	1204
15	Japan 3 (JPN)	417	400	395	427	374	405	2418
	Maki Nakano	222	222	172	223	213	214	1266
	Haruka Matsuda	195	178	223	204	161	191	1152
16	China 3 (CHN)	403	353	458	395	392	400	2401
	Chen Dongdong	196	166	216	217	221	193	1209
	Xu Lan	207	187	242	178	171	207	1192
17	Japan 2 (JPN)	353	367	423	434	396	422	2395
	Yukari Honma	171	188	222	178	225	234	1218
	Nao Ohishi	182	179	201	256	171	188	1177
18	Chinese Taipei 2 (TPE)	393	438	389	374	394	405	2393
	Pan Yu-fen	202	238	177	184	202	212	1215
	Tsai Hsin-yi	191	200	212	190	192	193	1178
19	Malaysia 1 (MAS)	343	383	417	406	403	392	2344
	Jane Sin	153	171	215	191	211	228	1169
	Zandra Aziela	190	212	202	215	192	164	1175
20	Philippines 1 (PHI)	424	383	387	393	371	384	2342
	Apple Posadas	170	215	203	208	189	236	1221
	Lara Posadas	254	168	184	185	182	148	1121
21	Singapore 3 (SIN)	422	422	354	346	440	355	2339
	New Hui Fen	205	199	168	164	247	164	1147
	Shayna Ng	217	223	186	182	193	191	1192
22	Indonesia 3 (INA)	367	427	354	415	387	376	2326
	Ivana Hie	197	189	172	181	189	186	1114
	Novie Phang	170	238	182	234	198	190	1212
23	Indonesia 2 (INA)	382	393	362	369	392	423	2321
	Shalima Zalsha	190	192	189	166	193	214	1144
	Sharon Limansantoso	192	201	173	203	199	209	1177
24	Hong Kong 2 (HKG)	382	421	371	374	373	384	2305
	Chan Shuk Han	185	211	196	191	188	191	1162
	Vanessa Fung	197	210	175	183	185	193	1143
25	Hong Kong 1 (HKG)	405	401	393	411	345	335	2290
	Milki Ng	238	212	213	216	170	190	1239
	Zoe Tam	167	189	180	195	175	145	1051
26	China 1 (CHN)	363	406	393	396	359	344	2261
	Sun Hongdou	170	236	199	207	176	165	1153
	Jiang Wei	193	170	194	189	183	179	1108
27	Macau 3 (MAC)	415	400	338	360	309	426	2248
	Julia Lam	191	185	166	176	137	236	1091
	Hui Tong	224	215	172	184	172	190	1157
28	Macau 2 (MAC)	333	355	364	355	389	434	2230
	Chan Weng Sam	145	150	129	174	200	203	1001
	Filomena Choi	188	205	235	181	189	231	1229
29	India 1 (IND)	349	324	361	379	404	399	2216
	Pratima Hegde	162	164	166	216	177	192	1077
	Swapna Mitra	187	160	195	163	227	207	1139
30	Thailand 1 (THA)	345	368	360	363	329	414	2179
	Apinyata Jonbumrung	168	214	175	201	158	212	1128
	Panacha Boonma	177	154	185	162	171	202	1051
31	Chinese Taipei 1 (TPE)	360	381	366	334	359	372	2172
	Wang Ting-wen	178	197	208	177	170	190	1120
	Yang Hao-ting	182	184	158	157	189	182	1052
32	Macau 1 (MAC)	351	394	351	350	317	373	2136
	Tchiang Sin U	179	200	168	203	162	179	1091
	Un Im Cheng	172	194	183	147	155	194	1045
33	Athletes from Kuwait 1 (IOC)	335	321	333	383	326	347	2045
	Hanadi Al-Mezaiel	202	162	184	190	187	164	1089
	Farah Al-Mulla	133	159	149	193	139	183	956
34	Mongolia 2 (MGL)	301	287	283	285	354	293	1803
	Sosoryn Khandaa	123	145	138	141	164	157	868
	Shatarbalyn Gerlee	178	142	145	144	190	136	935
35	Athletes from Kuwait 2 (IOC)	314	323	310	279	305	253	1784
	Bashaer Rashed	171	170	139	163	161	146	950
	Shaikha Al-Hendi	143	153	171	116	144	107	834
36	Mongolia 1 (MGL)	244	341	240	289	269	277	1660
	Tsodongiin Urantsetseg	117	185	112	156	142	128	840
	Terveegiin Dorjderem	127	156	128	133	127	149	820
37	Athletes from Kuwait 3 (IOC)	287	252	235	268	234	295	1571
	Fatima Mohammad	156	151	153	157	133	155	905
	Abrar Al-Zanki	131	101	82	111	101	140	666
Individuals
	Sonia Ho (HKG)	201	162	199	203	139	164	1068

- China was awarded bronze because of no three-medal sweep per country rule.
