= Bowling at the 2010 Asian Games – Women's trios =

Women's trios at the 2010 Asian Games
- Venue: Tianhe Bowling Hall
- Date: 19–20 November 2010
- Competitors: 69 from 13 nations

Medalists
gold medal	Singapore; Cherie Tan, Geraldine Ng, Shayna Ng
silver medal	South Korea; Choi Jin-a, Son Yun-hee, Hwang Sun-ok
bronze medal	China; Zhang Yuhong, Yang Suiling, Chen Dongdong

The women's trios competition at the 2010 Asian Games in Guangzhou was held on 19 and 20 November 2010 at Tianhe Bowling Hall.

== Schedule ==
All times are China Standard Time (UTC+08:00)

Date	Time	Event
Friday, 19 November 2010	13:30	First block
Saturday, 20 November 2010	13:30	Second block

== Results ==
Rank	Team	Game						Total
Rank	Team	1	2	3	4	5	6	Total
1st place, gold medalist(s)	Singapore 1 (SIN)	648	628	735	664	631	611	3917
	Cherie Tan	216	186	231	213	220	232	1298
	Geraldine Ng	210	204	256	250	223	183	1326
	Shayna Ng	222	238	248	201	188	196	1293
2nd place, silver medalist(s)	South Korea 1 (KOR)	644	711	696	544	642	612	3849
	Choi Jin-a	227	256	235	179	234	177	1308
	Son Yun-hee	200	198	246	183	194	190	1211
	Hwang Sun-ok	217	257	215	182	214	245	1330
3rd place, bronze medalist(s)	China 1 (CHN)	709	685	581	609	638	619	3841
	Zhang Yuhong	268	225	168	192	234	214	1301
	Yang Suiling	215	226	210	218	225	193	1287
	Chen Dongdong	226	234	203	199	179	212	1253
4	Malaysia 2 (MAS)	727	640	624	582	601	646	3820
	Esther Cheah	246	268	202	181	176	226	1299
	Sharon Koh	247	194	196	223	191	214	1265
	Shalin Zulkifli	234	178	226	178	234	206	1256
5	Japan 2 (JPN)	662	697	649	597	636	548	3789
	Maki Nakano	244	241	236	226	222	182	1351
	Misaki Mukotani	233	226	224	192	211	129	1215
	Kanako Ishimine	185	230	189	179	203	237	1223
6	South Korea 2 (KOR)	651	660	585	578	609	661	3744
	Gang Hye-eun	199	235	212	184	201	189	1220
	Hong Su-yeon	193	179	190	200	202	233	1197
	Jeon Eun-hee	259	246	183	194	206	239	1327
7	Malaysia 1 (MAS)	580	597	661	650	511	737	3736
	Jane Sin	179	203	257	174	173	211	1197
	Zatil Iman	203	213	181	199	151	269	1216
	Zandra Aziela	198	181	223	277	187	257	1323
8	Indonesia 2 (INA)	574	663	577	601	595	653	3663
	Ivana Hie	212	179	191	167	235	201	1185
	Novie Phang	191	279	204	226	183	236	1319
	Shalima Zalsha	171	205	182	208	177	216	1159
9	Philippines 1 (PHI)	684	629	639	598	580	523	3653
	Liza Clutario	215	180	210	163	192	168	1128
	Liza del Rosario	257	193	182	191	223	182	1228
	Apple Posadas	212	256	247	244	165	173	1297
10	Singapore 2 (SIN)	684	580	605	537	660	560	3626
	Jasmine Yeong-Nathan	226	183	169	179	214	223	1194
	Jazreel Tan	244	210	211	195	244	192	1296
	New Hui Fen	214	187	225	163	202	145	1136
11	Chinese Taipei 1 (TPE)	573	567	620	582	560	630	3532
	Pan Yu-fen	170	226	213	212	193	197	1211
	Tsai Hsin-yi	187	168	201	177	195	258	1186
	Tang Ya-chun	216	173	206	193	172	175	1135
12	Hong Kong 1 (HKG)	576	541	573	621	584	598	3493
	Chan Shuk Han	180	170	207	203	226	198	1184
	Vanessa Fung	191	216	201	205	177	198	1188
	Milki Ng	205	155	165	213	181	202	1121
13	Japan 1 (JPN)	586	557	587	581	551	596	3458
	Haruka Matsuda	209	167	191	224	207	198	1196
	Yukari Honma	191	246	213	163	167	212	1192
	Nao Ohishi	186	144	183	194	177	186	1070
14	Indonesia 1 (INA)	583	638	542	537	558	569	3427
	Putty Armein	182	299	166	188	171	159	1165
	Sharon Limansantoso	200	185	166	168	198	175	1092
	Tannya Roumimper	201	154	210	181	189	235	1170
15	Thailand 1 (THA)	614	584	545	519	578	576	3416
	Angkana Netrviseth	215	216	209	168	187	173	1168
	Benchawan Poungthong	233	192	183	177	179	211	1175
	Panacha Boonma	166	176	153	174	212	192	1073
16	China 2 (CHN)	535	646	568	596	512	556	3413
	Sun Hongdou	168	211	190	213	176	171	1129
	Jiang Wei	192	190	197	195	168	222	1164
	Xu Lan	175	245	181	188	168	163	1120
17	Chinese Taipei 2 (TPE)	590	545	607	514	553	578	3387
	Wang Ting-wen	193	180	178	169	168	202	1090
	Wang Yu-ling	184	173	193	165	183	164	1062
	Yang Hao-ting	213	192	236	180	202	212	1235
18	Macau 1 (MAC)	570	568	563	582	512	554	3349
	Chan Weng Sam	224	214	201	212	199	223	1273
	Tchiang Sin U	172	159	189	194	158	144	1016
	Un Im Cheng	174	195	173	176	155	187	1060
19	Macau 2 (MAC)	544	570	516	575	577	526	3308
	Julia Lam	179	168	159	176	170	164	1016
	Hui Tong	179	228	180	224	183	194	1188
	Filomena Choi	186	174	177	175	224	168	1104
20	Philippines 2 (PHI)	525	632	535	544	499	549	3284
	Kimberly Lao	195	222	166	222	158	221	1184
	Krizziah Tabora	171	182	182	153	140	161	989
	Lara Posadas	159	228	187	169	201	167	1111
21	Athletes from Kuwait 2 (IOC)	410	465	554	425	449	476	2779
	Hanadi Al-Mezaiel	168	148	253	164	166	167	1066
	Bashaer Rashed	116	202	155	166	158	178	975
	Shaikha Al-Hendi	126	115	146	95	125	131	738
22	Mongolia 1 (MGL)	429	466	402	390	378	408	2473
	Tsodongiin Urantsetseg	144	155	113	114	91	132	749
	Sosoryn Khandaa	144	120	149	129	128	153	823
	Shatarbalyn Gerlee	141	191	140	147	159	123	901
23	Athletes from Kuwait 1 (IOC)	469	342	433	368	430	410	2452
	Farah Al-Mulla	156	104	135	122	147	153	817
	Fatima Mohammad	194	140	186	138	177	148	983
	Abrar Al-Zanki	119	98	112	108	106	109	652
Individuals
	Sonia Ho (HKG)	184	155	171	145	181	169	1005
	Zoe Tam (HKG)	185	217	215	176	188	181	1162
	Pratima Hegde (IND)	211	194	191	162	147	211	1116
	Swapna Mitra (IND)	177	153	201	148	197	196	1072
	Terveegiin Dorjderem (MGL)	146	170	123	99	125	155	818
	Apinyata Jonbumrung (THA)	184	188	176	180	198	231	1157
