= Bowling at the 2010 Asian Games – Women's singles =

Women's singles at the 2010 Asian Games
- Venue: Tianhe Bowling Hall
- Date: 16 November 2010
- Competitors: 77 from 14 nations

Medalists
gold medal	Hwang Sun-ok	South Korea
silver medal	Shayna Ng	Singapore
bronze medal	New Hui Fen	Singapore

The women's singles competition at the 2010 Asian Games in Guangzhou was held on 16 November 2010 at Tianhe Bowling Hall.

== Schedule ==
All times are China Standard Time (UTC+08:00)

Date	Time	Event
Tuesday, 16 November 2010	09:00	Squad A
Tuesday, 16 November 2010	14:30	Squad B

== Results ==
Legend

- DNS — Did not start

Rank	Athlete	Game						Total
Rank	Athlete	1	2	3	4	5	6	Total
1st place, gold medalist(s)	Hwang Sun-ok (KOR)	219	237	259	240	215	225	1395
2nd place, silver medalist(s)	Shayna Ng (SIN)	245	193	224	300	227	153	1342
3rd place, bronze medalist(s)	New Hui Fen (SIN)	227	221	257	198	206	232	1341
4	Hong Su-yeon (KOR)	214	236	170	237	268	204	1329
5	Sharon Koh (MAS)	214	231	224	229	237	183	1318
6	Cherie Tan (SIN)	233	191	189	289	202	205	1309
7	Tannya Roumimper (INA)	195	213	255	248	215	174	1300
8	Son Yun-hee (KOR)	168	236	188	225	235	246	1298
9	Haruka Matsuda (JPN)	203	267	216	193	208	202	1289
10	Maki Nakano (JPN)	222	203	213	238	187	205	1268
11	Tang Ya-chun (TPE)	164	202	184	205	265	215	1235
12	Chen Dongdong (CHN)	179	195	218	196	204	227	1219
12	Putty Armein (INA)	186	235	181	152	235	230	1219
14	Gang Hye-eun (KOR)	202	245	236	180	176	177	1216
15	Geraldine Ng (SIN)	206	177	198	171	225	223	1200
16	Jeon Eun-hee (KOR)	232	207	184	178	202	196	1199
17	Jazreel Tan (SIN)	190	178	223	245	193	156	1185
18	Apple Posadas (PHI)	219	167	186	204	226	181	1183
19	Zandra Aziela (MAS)	191	166	202	235	190	198	1182
20	Zatil Iman (MAS)	201	170	236	171	224	178	1180
21	Tsai Hsin-yi (TPE)	169	188	216	223	181	201	1178
22	Yang Suiling (CHN)	185	190	195	198	223	176	1167
23	Kimberly Lao (PHI)	197	140	207	222	201	199	1166
24	Jane Sin (MAS)	212	191	198	203	175	182	1161
25	Yang Hao-ting (TPE)	179	182	195	219	203	179	1157
25	Liza del Rosario (PHI)	201	191	186	200	155	224	1157
27	Zhang Yuhong (CHN)	178	215	192	179	179	213	1156
28	Choi Jin-a (KOR)	186	220	189	192	193	173	1153
29	Chan Shuk Han (HKG)	180	218	150	225	200	179	1152
30	Jasmine Yeong-Nathan (SIN)	180	179	228	219	198	147	1151
31	Xu Lan (CHN)	204	196	188	199	215	147	1149
32	Misaki Mukotani (JPN)	156	187	186	203	216	198	1146
32	Angkana Netrviseth (THA)	159	211	148	195	224	209	1146
32	Sharon Limansantoso (INA)	168	167	168	194	192	257	1146
35	Panacha Boonma (THA)	196	177	212	184	182	194	1145
36	Esther Cheah (MAS)	205	185	171	170	211	194	1136
37	Wang Yu-ling (TPE)	170	235	233	176	165	152	1131
38	Pan Yu-fen (TPE)	193	185	152	202	212	186	1130
39	Shalin Zulkifli (MAS)	232	212	145	192	149	194	1124
39	Lara Posadas (PHI)	185	150	177	213	217	182	1124
41	Milki Ng (HKG)	164	164	177	166	218	227	1116
42	Jiang Wei (CHN)	167	179	182	195	197	188	1108
43	Filomena Choi (MAC)	166	180	190	160	193	215	1104
44	Liza Clutario (PHI)	161	166	185	209	225	155	1101
44	Sun Hongdou (CHN)	210	175	211	152	160	193	1101
46	Pratima Hegde (IND)	175	175	173	192	194	184	1093
47	Vanessa Fung (HKG)	191	186	138	191	215	164	1085
48	Yukari Honma (JPN)	194	174	170	191	190	165	1084
48	Krizziah Tabora (PHI)	161	211	181	148	202	181	1084
50	Kanako Ishimine (JPN)	176	177	227	176	156	165	1077
51	Nao Ohishi (JPN)	194	197	186	135	173	191	1076
52	Wang Ting-wen (TPE)	180	192	165	168	172	176	1053
53	Apinyata Jonbumrung (THA)	200	202	153	152	154	189	1050
54	Benchawan Poungthong (THA)	195	158	169	163	178	185	1048
55	Swapna Mitra (IND)	168	195	161	181	148	192	1045
56	Zoe Tam (HKG)	181	158	147	227	172	156	1041
57	Chan Weng Sam (MAC)	174	143	164	169	224	149	1023
58	Julia Lam (MAC)	181	182	155	173	169	149	1009
59	Novie Phang (INA)	148	223	161	169	147	160	1008
60	Un Im Cheng (MAC)	204	149	197	146	171	137	1004
61	Ivana Hie (INA)	142	156	174	194	160	170	996
61	Shalima Zalsha (INA)	143	166	169	170	202	146	996
63	Hui Tong (MAC)	161	149	154	141	200	190	995
64	Sonia Ho (HKG)	156	194	144	190	156	152	992
64	Bashaer Rashed (IOC)	143	201	192	145	159	152	992
66	Tchiang Sin U (MAC)	178	190	159	156	162	125	970
67	Hanadi Al-Mezaiel (IOC)	125	129	132	150	164	193	893
68	Farah Al-Mulla (IOC)	183	124	121	166	172	124	890
69	Sosoryn Khandaa (MGL)	150	145	115	149	145	156	860
70	Fatima Mohammad (IOC)	157	126	128	136	153	153	853
71	Shatarbalyn Gerlee (MGL)	114	155	133	151	152	131	836
72	Shaikha Al-Hendi (IOC)	134	150	117	101	193	138	833
73	Terveegiin Dorjderem (MGL)	120	161	119	128	149	119	796
74	Tsodongiin Urantsetseg (MGL)	150	128	153	130	130	101	792
75	Abrar Al-Zanki (IOC)	108	97	113	133	140	119	710
—	Sumathi Nallabantu (IND)							DNS
—	Namratha Karanth (IND)							DNS
