= Bowling at the 2010 Asian Games – Women's masters =

Women's masters at the 2010 Asian Games
- Venue: Tianhe Bowling Hall
- Date: 23–24 November 2010
- Competitors: 16 from 8 nations

Medalists
gold medal	Hwang Sun-ok	South Korea
silver medal	Cherie Tan	Singapore
bronze medal	Choi Jin-a	South Korea

The women's masters competition at the 2010 Asian Games in Guangzhou was held from 23 November to 24 November 2010 at Tianhe Bowling Hall.

The Masters event comprises the top 16 bowlers (maximum two per country) from the all-events competition.

== Schedule ==
All times are China Standard Time (UTC+08:00)

Date	Time	Event
Tuesday, 23 November 2010	13:00	First block
Wednesday, 24 November 2010	13:00	Second block
Wednesday, 24 November 2010	18:35	Stepladder 2nd/3rd place
Wednesday, 24 November 2010	19:15	Stepladder 1st/2nd place

== Results ==
=== Preliminary ===
Rank	Athlete	Game																Total
Rank	Athlete	1	2	3	4	5	6	7	8	9	10	11	12	13	14	15	16	Total
1	Hwang Sun-ok (KOR)	255; 0	234; 10	223; 10	236; 10	189; 0	225; 5	225; 10	221; 10	211; 10	227; 10	256; 10	233; 10	218; 10	204; 10	268; 10	177; 0	3727
2	Choi Jin-a (KOR)	266; 10	195; 0	195; 10	233; 10	238; 10	170; 0	180; 0	214; 0	279; 10	223; 0	246; 10	194; 0	234; 10	265; 10	235; 10	222; 10	3689
3	Cherie Tan (SIN)	233; 0	237; 10	212; 10	216; 0	197; 0	225; 5	204; 0	167; 0	204; 10	224; 10	204; 10	189; 10	212; 10	182; 0	238; 10	227; 10	3466
4	Sharon Koh (MAS)	227; 0	223; 0	177; 0	211; 0	200; 10	209; 10	246; 10	206; 10	189; 0	176; 0	206; 10	205; 10	214; 10	213; 10	256; 10	216; 0	3464
5	Esther Cheah (MAS)	236; 10	200; 0	181; 10	229; 10	227; 10	222; 10	186; 0	247; 10	200; 10	210; 10	190; 10	195; 10	192; 0	197; 0	209; 0	208; 10	3439
6	Chen Dongdong (CHN)	216; 10	206; 0	170; 0	236; 10	187; 0	204; 10	279; 10	193; 0	202; 10	211; 10	203; 10	214; 10	191; 10	213; 10	201; 0	188; 0	3414
7	Apple Posadas (PHI)	172; 0	241; 0	147; 0	227; 10	178; 0	278; 10	214; 10	187; 0	194; 0	210; 0	189; 0	234; 10	217; 10	196; 10	248; 10	188; 0	3390
8	Tannya Roumimper (INA)	213; 0	266; 10	188; 0	195; 0	180; 0	221; 0	194; 10	235; 10	177; 0	173; 0	258; 10	169; 0	165; 0	247; 10	246; 0	199; 10	3386
9	Novie Phang (INA)	235; 10	176; 0	203; 10	193; 10	202; 10	204; 0	162; 0	202; 10	202; 10	222; 10	200; 0	187; 10	187; 0	245; 0	215; 10	187; 10	3322
10	Zhang Yuhong (CHN)	198; 0	237; 10	202; 0	185; 0	222; 10	175; 0	201; 0	212; 10	172; 0	214; 0	195; 10	180; 10	226; 10	223; 10	210; 10	179; 0	3311
11	Maki Nakano (JPN)	203; 10	230; 10	200; 10	161; 0	223; 10	248; 10	216; 10	215; 10	169; 0	185; 10	196; 0	202; 0	204; 0	191; 0	173; 0	201; 0	3297
12	Shayna Ng (SIN)	244; 10	258; 10	194; 0	235; 0	157; 0	176; 0	231; 10	248; 10	176; 10	149; 0	241; 0	166; 0	188; 0	179; 0	174; 0	202; 10	3278
13	Tang Ya-chun (TPE)	200; 10	216; 10	179; 0	197; 10	183; 0	197; 0	206; 10	223; 0	186; 0	235; 10	175; 0	202; 0	199; 0	191; 0	201; 0	220; 10	3270
14	Liza del Rosario (PHI)	178; 10	254; 10	213; 0	191; 10	190; 10	279; 10	194; 0	196; 0	153; 0	148; 0	220; 0	182; 0	198; 0	170; 0	239; 0	212; 0	3267
15	Pan Yu-fen (TPE)	185; 0	214; 0	203; 10	166; 0	216; 10	169; 0	181; 0	175; 0	215; 10	205; 0	186; 0	180; 0	173; 0	203; 10	187; 10	194; 10	3112
16	Misaki Mukotani (JPN)	171; 0	202; 0	223; 10	206; 0	170; 0	227; 10	169; 0	150; 0	180; 0	203; 10	178; 0	192; 0	234; 10	173; 0	193; 0	184; 0	3095

=== Stepladder finals ===
Stepladder 2nd/3rd place			Stepladder 1st/2nd place
			1	Hwang Sun-ok (KOR)	278	204	482
2	Choi Jin-a (KOR)	191	3	Cherie Tan (SIN)	258	214	472
3	Cherie Tan (SIN)	266
