= Diving at the 2010 Asian Games – Women's 3 metre springboard =

Women's 3 metre springboard at the 2010 Asian Games
- Venue: Aoti Aquatics Centre
- Date: 26 November 2010
- Competitors: 11 from 7 nations

Medalists
gold medal	He Zi	China
silver medal	Shi Tingmao	China
bronze medal	Choi Sut Ian	Macau

The women's 3 metre springboard diving competition at the 2010 Asian Games in Guangzhou was held on 26 November at the Aoti Aquatics Centre.

== Schedule ==
All times are China Standard Time (UTC+08:00)

Date	Time	Event
Friday, 26 November 2010	10:00	Preliminary
Friday, 26 November 2010	15:30	Final

== Results ==
=== Preliminary ===
Rank	Athlete	Dive					Total
Rank	Athlete	1	2	3	4	5	Total
1	He Zi (CHN)	67.50	74.40	76.50	75.00	73.50	366.90
2	Shi Tingmao (CHN)	69.00	71.40	72.00	72.00	72.00	356.40
3	Choi Sut Ian (MAC)	54.00	59.40	54.60	67.50	50.75	286.25
4	Sayaka Shibusawa (JPN)	58.50	55.50	46.50	55.50	64.50	280.50
5	Sheila Mae Perez (PHI)	54.00	58.80	47.60	54.00	58.00	272.40
6	Mai Nakagawa (JPN)	43.40	55.50	63.00	54.00	43.20	259.10
7	Lee Yae-rim (KOR)	48.00	45.00	50.40	56.70	47.60	247.70
8	Sari Ambarwati (INA)	50.40	54.00	42.00	42.00	39.00	227.40
9	Lei Sio I (MAC)	51.60	60.00	30.00	28.50	48.00	218.10
10	Hoàng Thanh Trà (VIE)	49.20	40.50	42.00	32.20	45.60	209.50
11	Nguyễn Vũ Thảo Quỳnh (VIE)	48.00	32.40	36.00	16.80	36.00	169.20

=== Final ===
Rank	Athlete	Dive					Total
Rank	Athlete	1	2	3	4	5	Total
1st place, gold medalist(s)	He Zi (CHN)	78.00	77.50	73.50	76.50	76.50	382.00
2nd place, silver medalist(s)	Shi Tingmao (CHN)	76.50	64.40	75.00	78.00	66.00	359.90
3rd place, bronze medalist(s)	Choi Sut Ian (MAC)	42.00	54.00	58.80	67.50	65.25	287.55
4	Mai Nakagawa (JPN)	54.00	58.50	61.50	49.50	60.75	284.25
5	Sheila Mae Perez (PHI)	51.60	50.40	58.80	63.00	59.45	283.25
6	Lei Sio I (MAC)	49.20	61.50	58.50	52.50	54.00	275.70
7	Sayaka Shibusawa (JPN)	57.00	67.50	60.45	22.50	64.50	271.95
8	Hoàng Thanh Trà (VIE)	49.20	54.00	39.00	47.60	43.20	233.00
9	Lee Yae-rim (KOR)	37.20	40.00	47.60	49.95	30.80	205.55
10	Sari Ambarwati (INA)	49.20	52.65	48.00	31.50	18.00	199.35
11	Nguyễn Vũ Thảo Quỳnh (VIE)	46.80	44.55	28.00	29.40	43.20	191.95
