= Dong Ying =

Chinese female sprint canoer

Personal information
- Native name: 董瑛
- Nationality: Chinese
- Born: 5 September 1972 (age 53) Shanghai, China
- Height: 1.76 m (5 ft 9 in)
- Weight: 73 kg (161 lb)

Sport
- Country: China
- Sport: female Canoe sprinter
Medal record
Women's canoe sprint
Representing China
World Championships
Silver medal – second place	1995 Duisburg	K-4 500 m
Asian Games
Gold medal – first place	1990 Beijing	K-4 500 m
Gold medal – first place	1994 Hiroshima	K-1 500 m

Dong Ying
- Traditional Chinese: 董瑛
- Simplified Chinese: 董瑛
Transcriptions
Standard Mandarin
- Hanyu Pinyin: Dǒng Yīng

Dong Ying (Chinese: 董瑛; pinyin: Dǒng Yīng; born September 5, 1972, in Nanhui, Shanghai) is a Chinese female sprint canoer who competed in the mid-1990s. She won a silver medal in the K-4 500 m event at the 1995 ICF Canoe Sprint World Championships in Duisburg, Germany.

Ying also finished fourth in the K-4 500 m event at the 1996 Summer Olympics in Atlanta after finishing third in the preliminaries.
