= Jasmine Yeong-Nathan =

Singaporean bowling player

Jasmine Yeong-Nathan (Simplified Chinese: 杨于萱, born 1988) is a Singaporean ten-pin bowler. Yeong-Nathan was the first Singaporean to win the QubicaAMF Bowling World Cup in 2008.

== Education ==
Yeong-Nathan studied at Singapore Polytechnic and Nanyang Technological University.

== Career ==
Yeong-Nathan is a Management Consulting Associate with KPMG which she joined since 2009.

=== Bowling career ===
Yeong-Nathan was the 2005 and 2014 Singapore national bowling champion.

Yeong-Nathan represented Singapore at the 2006 QubicaAMF Bowling World Cup.

At the 2008 AMF World Cup, Yeong-Nathan beat the defending champion Ann-Maree Putney from Australia in straight sets (263-222 and 298-215), becoming the first Singaporean ever to win an AMF World Cup title. She was named Singapore's Sportswoman of the Year in 2009 for her victory at the 2008 AMF World Cup.

In 2015, Yeong-Nathan failed to make it to the national team for the 2015 Southeast Asian Games due to a strong bowling team. Head coach Remy Ong claimed that the strength of the team was very even and that Yeong-Nathan as the reserve player could make the team anytime if any team player is to exit the team.

In 2016, Yeong-Nathan won bronze in the women's Masters event at the Asian Tenpin Bowling Championships held at Hong Kong.

In 2023, Yeong-Nathan, alongside Lim Tong Hai, was the assistant chef-de-mission for the Singapore delegation to the 2023 SEA Games.

== Personal life ==
Yeong-Nathan is the younger sister of Jason Yeong-Nathan, who is also a former Singapore national bowler.
