= Shabbir Dhankot =

Indian ten-pin bowling player

Shabbir Dhankot is an Indian ten-pin bowling player. In 2015 under 23rd Asian Championship, Shabbir won first-ever medal for India in any Asian Championship by winning a Silver. He had earlier won bronze in 2011 Commonwealth Tenpin Bowling Championship in Team event.
