= Syafiq Ridhwan =

Malaysian ten-pin bowler

Personal information
- Full name: Muhamad Syafiq Ridhwan bin Abdul Malik
- Born: 29 November 1986 (age 39) Wilayah Persekutuan, Malaysia

Sport
- Sport: Bowling
Medal record
Representing Malaysia
Men's Bowling
Asian Bowling Championships
Gold medal – first place	2011 Abu Dhabi	Trios
Southeast Asian Games
Gold medal – first place	2011 Jakarta	Team of 5
Gold medal – first place	2017 Kuala Lumpur	Doubles
Silver medal – second place	2011 Jakarta	Trios
Bronze medal – third place	2011 Jakarta	Doubles
Bronze medal – third place	2011 Jakarta	Masters

Syafiq Ridhwan Abdul Malik is a Malaysian ten-pin bowler. He was born on 29 November 1986 in Federal Territories (Malaysia). He bowls right handed with a 15lbs ball.

== Career ==
During 2012 QubicaAMF Bowling World Cup event, he became the first Malaysian to win the world cup.
