= Biboy Rivera =

Filipino ten-pin bowler (born 1974)

- Born: Engelberto L. Rivera; March 25, 1974 (age 51); Quezon City

Biboy Rivera
Medal record

Men's ten-pin bowling

World Tenpin Bowling Championships
Gold medal – first place	2006 Busan	Masters

Asian Games
Gold medal – first place	2010 Guangzhou	Singles

Engelberto "Biboy" Rivera (born March 25, 1974) is a world-champion Ten-pin bowler from the Philippines. He has won the WTBA World Tenpin Bowling Championships in 2006 and the Asian Games gold medal for men's singles bowling in 2010. Rivera is also the recipient of the Philippine Sportswriters' Association (PSA) Athlete of the Year Award twice (in 2006 and 2011).

== Career and Honors ==
Rivera won 10 championships from the Southeast Asian level up to the world stage culminating in his 2006 World Championships win. He has won a gold medal in the 2001 Southeast Asian Games in Kuala Lumpur and in the 2002 Asian Championships in Hong Kong, he teamed up with fellow Filipino Chester King to win the men's doubles gold. He is also a regular fixture at the Asian Bowling circuit culminating in a runner-up finish in the Grand Slam finals in 2009. Aside from his 2006 World Championship win, he has won runners-up finishes from the World Cup back in 2010 and 2011.

Coaching Career

As a coach, Biboy Rivera has been instrumental in developing young bowling talents in the Philippines. Notably, he discovered and recruited Singapore-based bowler Zach Sales Ramin to the Philippine national youth development squad. Under Rivera's mentorship, Ramin achieved significant milestones, including becoming the youngest-ever winner and the first Filipino male to clinch the Singapore Open title since 1965. Ramin also played a crucial role in the Philippine boys' team's historic victory at the 21st Asian Youth Tenpin Bowling Championships in Bangkok, Thailand, where they secured the overall crown for the first time.

Rivera's dedication to nurturing young athletes continues to contribute to the resurgence of Philippine bowling on the international stage.
