= Philippines at the 2010 Asian Games =

- IOC code: PHI
- NOC: Philippine Olympic Committee
- Website: www.olympic.ph (in English)

in Guangzhou
- Competitors: 188 in 29 sports
- Flag bearer: Mikee Cojuangco-Jaworski
- Medals Ranked 17th: Gold 3 Silver 4 Bronze 9 Total 16

Asian Games appearances (overview)
- 1951; 1954; 1958; 1962; 1966; 1970; 1974; 1978; 1982; 1986; 1990; 1994; 1998; 2002; 2006; 2010; 2014; 2018; 2022; 2026

The Philippines participated in the 2010 Asian Games in Guangzhou, China from 12 to 27 November 2010.

== Medalists ==
=== Gold ===
No.	Medal	Name	Sport	Event
1	Gold	Engelberto Rivera	Bowling	Men's Singles
2	Gold	Rey Saludar	Boxing	Men's Flyweight 52kg
3	Gold	Dennis Orcollo	Cue Sports	Men's 9-Ball Singles

=== Silver ===
No.	Medal	Name	Sport	Event
1	Silver	Annie Albania	Boxing	Women's Flyweight 51kg
2	Silver	Wesley So; Eugene Torre; Darwin Laylo; John Paul Gomez; Rogelio Antonio Jr.	Chess	Men's Team Standard
3	Silver	Warren Kiamco	Cue Sports	Men's 9-Ball Singles
4	Silver	Miguel Luis Tabuena	Golf	Men's Individual

=== Bronze ===
No.	Medal	Name	Sport	Event
1	Bronze	Frederick Ong	Bowling	Men's Singles
2	Bronze	Victorio Saludar	Boxing	Men's Light flyweight 49kg
3	Bronze	Ronnie Steeve Vergara; Charlea Lagaras	Dancesport	Latin - Paso Doble
4	Bronze	Ronnie Steeve Vergara; Charlea Lagaras	Dancesport	Latin - Cha-Cha-Cha
5	Bronze	Tshomlee Go	Taekwondo	Men's Under 63kg
6	Bronze	John Paul Lizardo	Taekwondo	Men's Under 54kg
7	Bronze	Paul Romero	Taekwondo	Men's Under 58kg
8	Bronze	Kirstie Elaine Alora	Taekwondo	Women's Under 63kg
9	Bronze	Mark Eddiva	Wushu	Men's Sanda 65kg

=== Multiple ===
Name	Sport	Gold	Silver	Bronze	Total
Ronnie Steeve Vergara	Dancesport	0	0	2	2
Charlea Lagaras	Dancesport	0	0	2	2

== Medal summary ==
=== Medal by sports ===
Sport	1st place, gold medalist(s)	2nd place, silver medalist(s)	3rd place, bronze medalist(s)	Total
Boxing	1	1	1	3
Cue Sports	1	1	0	2
Bowling	1	0	1	2
Golf	0	1	0	1
Chess	0	1	0	1
Taekwondo	0	0	4	4
Dancesport	0	0	2	2
Wushu	0	0	1	1
Total	3	4	9	16

== Aquatics ==
=== Diving ===
13 athletes (including swimming and diving)

Athlete	Event	Preliminary		Finals	
Athlete	Event	Points	Rank	Points	Rank
Niño Carog	1 m springboard			264.00	13th
Niño Carog	3 m springboard	355.00	10Q	355.45	9th
Rexel Ryan Fabriga; Jaime Asok	synchronized 10 m platform			142.50	Did Not Finish
Nino Carog; Zardo Domenios	synchronized 3 m springboard			341.34	5th
Sheila Mae Perez	1 m springboard			232.35	8th
Sheila Mae Perez	3 m springboard	272.40	5Q	283.25	5th

=== Swimming ===
==== Men ====
Athlete	Event	Heats		Final	
Athlete	Event	Time	Rank	Time	Rank
Ryan Paulo Arabejo	1500 m freestyle			16:11.74	7th
Ryan Paulo Arabejo	200 m backstroke	Did Not Show			
Ryan Paulo Arabejo	400 m Freestyle	4:03.36	11th	Did Not Advance	
Daniel Coakley	50 m freestyle	23.82	16th	Did Not Advance	
Daniel Coakley	100 m freestyle	52.71	23rd	Did Not Advance	
Jessie King Lacuna	100 m butterfly	Did Not Finish			
Jessie King Lacuna	200 m butterfly	Did Not Show			
Jessie King Lacuna	200 m freestyle	1:53.50	12th	Did Not Advance	
Jessie King Lacuna	400 m freestyle	4:06.38	14th	Did Not Advance	
Miguel Molina	200 m breaststroke	2:17.15	7th	Disqualified	
Miguel Molina	200 m freestyle	Did Not Show			
Miguel Molina	200 m individual medley	2:04.94	5th	2:04.24	5th
Miguel Molina	400 m individual medley	Did Not Show			
Charles William Walker	100 m backstroke	59.57	18th	Did Not Advance	
Charles William Walker	100 m freestyle	52.40	22nd	Did Not Advance	
Daniel Coakley; Jessie King Lacnuna; Miguel Molina; Kendrick Uy; Charles William Walker	4 × 100 m Freestyle Relay	3:27.32	6th	3:26.90	7th
Daniel Coakley; Jessie King Lacnuna; Miguel Molina; Kendrick Uy; Charles William Walker	4 × 100 m Medley Relay	3:52.05	11th	Did Not Advance	
Daniel Coakley; Jessie King Lacnuna; Miguel Molina; Kendrick Uy; Charles William Walker	4 × 200 m Freestyle Relay	7:33.52	5th	7:30.76	4th

==== Women ====
Athlete	Event	Heats		Final	
Athlete	Event	Time	Rank	Time	Rank
Jasmine Alkhaldi	100 m butterfly	1:03.61	13th	Did Not Advance	
Jasmine Alkhaldi	100 m freestyle	58.01	12th	Did Not Advance	
Jasmine Alkhaldi	200 m freestyle	2:07.60	15th	Did Not Advance	
Jasmine Alkhaldi	50 m freestyle	26.75	12th	Did Not Advance	
Jasmine Alkhaldi	50 m butterfly	28.93	12th	Did Not Advance	
Erica Cirila Totten	200 m freestyle	2:04.97	7th	Did Not Advance	
Erica Cirila Totten	800 m freestyle	8:54.11	3rd	Did Not Advance	
Erica Cirila Totten	400 m Individual medley	5:01.59	9th	Did Not Advance	

== Archery ==
2 athletes

Athlete	Event	Qualifications		Round of 16	Quarterfinals	Semifinals	Finals	Rank
Athlete	Event	Points	Rank	Round of 16	Quarterfinals	Semifinals	Finals	Rank
Delfin Anthony Adriano	Men's Individual	1226	50Q	Takaharu Fukuhara (JPN) L 4-2	Did Not Advance			
Mark Javier	Men's Individual	1284	31Q	Chia Chun Sung (TPE) L 4-0	Did Not Advance			

== Athletics ==
7 athletes

=== Men's 3000 Steeplechase ===
Rene Herrera - 9:02.93 min 8th

=== Men's Hammerthrow ===
Arniel Ferrer - 58.06 m 9th

=== Men's Javelin Throw ===
Danilo Fresnido - 70.35 m 10th

=== Men's Long Jump ===
Henry Dagmil - 7.52 m 6th

=== Men's Marathon ===
Eduardo Buenavista

=== Women's Javelin Throw ===
Rosie Villarito - 48.87 m 9th

=== Women's Long Jump ===
Marestella Torres- 6.49 m 4th

== Basketball ==
2010 Philippines Asian Games basketball team
- Head coach: Rajko Toroman
- 2010 Asian Games: 6th Place

12 athletes

The 2010 Philippines men's Asian Games basketball team, was a Filipino Asian Games team assembled for the basketball competition on 2010 Asian Games.

Pos	No.	Player	Height	PBA Team
PG	4	Mark Andy Barroca	5ft 10in	FEU Tamaraws
PG	5	Chris Tiu	5ft 11in	Smart Gilas
PG	6	JVee Casio	5ft 10in	Smart Gilas
PG/SG	7	Sol Mercado	6ft 1in	Rain or Shine Elasto Painters
C/PF	8	Japeth Aguilar	6ft 9in	Smart Gilas
C	9	Greg Slaugther	7ft 0in	Ateneo Blue Eagles
SF/PF	10	Mac Baracael	6ft 3in	Alaska Aces
C	11	Asi Taulava	6ft 9in	Meralco Bolts
PF/C	12	Jason Ballesteros	6ft 6in	San Sebastian Stags
PF	13	Kelly Williams	6ft 7in	Talk 'N Text Tropang Texters
SG/SF	14	Marcio Lassiter	6ft 2in	Smart Gilas
SG/SF	15	Chris Lutz	6ft 3in	Smart Gilas

Head coach: Rajko Toroman

Assistant coach(es): Charles Tiu

=== Men's Basketball Team ===
Squad list	Qualifying round		Preliminary round		Quarterfinal	5th-8th	5th-6th	Rank
Squad list	Group B	Rank	Group F	Rank	Quarterfinal	5th-8th	5th-6th	Rank
Japeth Paul Aguilar; Jason Ballesteros; Marnel Baracael; Andy Mark Barroca; Joseph Evans Casio; Marcio Lassiter; Christopher Ryan Lutz; Solomon Jemuel Mercado; Gregory William Slaughter; Pauliasi Taulava; Christopher John Tiu; Kelly Williams Coach: (Serbia) Rajko Toroman	Players from Kuwait (KUW); W 76-69'		Iran; L 48-65	3rd	South Korea (KOR) L 66-74	North Korea (PRK) W 96-69	Qatar (QAT) L 71-81	6th
Japeth Paul Aguilar; Jason Ballesteros; Marnel Baracael; Andy Mark Barroca; Joseph Evans Casio; Marcio Lassiter; Christopher Ryan Lutz; Solomon Jemuel Mercado; Gregory William Slaughter; Pauliasi Taulava; Christopher John Tiu; Kelly Williams Coach: (Serbia) Rajko Toroman	Players from Kuwait (KUW); W 76-69'		Japan; L 58-60	3rd	South Korea (KOR) L 66-74	North Korea (PRK) W 96-69	Qatar (QAT) L 71-81	6th
Japeth Paul Aguilar; Jason Ballesteros; Marnel Baracael; Andy Mark Barroca; Joseph Evans Casio; Marcio Lassiter; Christopher Ryan Lutz; Solomon Jemuel Mercado; Gregory William Slaughter; Pauliasi Taulava; Christopher John Tiu; Kelly Williams Coach: (Serbia) Rajko Toroman	Players from Kuwait (KUW); W 76-69'		India; W 57-78	3rd	South Korea (KOR) L 66-74	North Korea (PRK) W 96-69	Qatar (QAT) L 71-81	6th
Japeth Paul Aguilar; Jason Ballesteros; Marnel Baracael; Andy Mark Barroca; Joseph Evans Casio; Marcio Lassiter; Christopher Ryan Lutz; Solomon Jemuel Mercado; Gregory William Slaughter; Pauliasi Taulava; Christopher John Tiu; Kelly Williams Coach: (Serbia) Rajko Toroman	Players from Kuwait (KUW); W 76-69'		Chinese Taipei; W 82-73	3rd	South Korea (KOR) L 66-74	North Korea (PRK) W 96-69	Qatar (QAT) L 71-81	6th
Japeth Paul Aguilar; Jason Ballesteros; Marnel Baracael; Andy Mark Barroca; Joseph Evans Casio; Marcio Lassiter; Christopher Ryan Lutz; Solomon Jemuel Mercado; Gregory William Slaughter; Pauliasi Taulava; Christopher John Tiu; Kelly Williams Coach: (Serbia) Rajko Toroman	Players from Kuwait (KUW); W 76-69'		Qatar; W 90-68	3rd	South Korea (KOR) L 66-74	North Korea (PRK) W 96-69	Qatar (QAT) L 71-81	6th

==== Group B ====
November 13
19:15

Philippines	76–69	Kuwait
Scoring by quarter: 11–16, 27–21, 19–22, 19–10

Guangti Gymnasium, Guangti

==== Group F ====
November 16
21:30

Iran	65–48	Philippines
Scoring by quarter: 17–10, 18–10, 12–10, 18–18
Pts: 2 tied at 11; Rebs: Asghar Kardoustpoustinsaraei - 9 Asts: 2 tied at 3		Pts: Christopher John Tiu - 14; Rebs: Kelly Williams - 14; Asts: Andy Barroca - 2

Huangpu Gymnasium, Huangpu
Referees: Ukraine Borys Shulga

November 17
19:15

Philippines	90–68	Qatar
Pts: Joseph Evans Casio - 22; Rebs: Kelly Williams - 9 Asts: Joseph Evans Casio - 5		Pts: Targuy Alban Ngombo - 18; Rebs: Baker Ahmad Mohammed - 8 Asts: 4 Tied at 1

Huangpu Gymnasium, Huangpu
Referees: Brazil Cristiano Jesus Maranho

November 19
21:30

Philippines	58–60	Japan
Scoring by quarter: 14–9, 15–21, 14–18, 15–12
Pts: Marcio Lassiter - 13; Rebs: Kelly Williams - 12; Asts: Andy Barroca - 3		Pts: Takumi Ishizaki - 16; Rebs: Kosuke Takeuchi - 11; Asts: Yuta Tabuse - 4

Huangpu Gymnasium, Huangpu
Referees: France Eddie Viator

November 21
21:30

India	57–78	Philippines
Scoring by quarter: 14-21, 16-10, 11-32, 16-15

Ying Dong Gymnasium, Ying Dong

November 22
21:30

Philippines	82–73	Chinese Taipei
Scoring by quarter: 20-21, 22-19, 22-14, 18-19

Ying Dong Gymnasium, Ying Dong

November 24
13:15

South Korea	74–66	Philippines
Scoring by quarter: 21–19, 44–36, 61–51, 74–66

Huangpu Gymnasium, Huangpu

November 25
14:15

5th-8th classif.

Philippines	96–69	North Korea
Scoring by quarter: 28–22, 26–15, 22–18, 20–14

Ying Dong Gymnasium, Ying Dong

November 26
16:30

5th place

Philippines	71–81	Qatar
Scoring by quarter: 17-17, 22-19, 25-24, 7-21

Ying Dong Gymnasium, Ying Dong

== Board Game - Chess ==
6 athletes

=== Men's Individual ===
Name	Round 1	Round 2	Round 3	Round 4	Round 5	Round 6	Round 7	Round 8	Round 9	Total	Rank
Wesley So	Samir Mohammad (SYR); W 1.0-0.0	Lee Sanghoon (KOR); L 0.0-1.0	Handszar Odeev (TKM); W 1.0-0.0	Susanto Megaranto (INA); W 1.0-0.0	Kazhgaleyev Murtas (KAZ); D 0.5-0.5	Gundavaa Bayarsaikhan (MGL); W 1.0-0.0	Krishnan Sasikiran (IND); L 0.0-1.0	Surya Shekhar Ganguly (IND); L 0.0-1.0	Anton Filippov (UZB); D 0.5-0.5	5.0-4.0	14th
Rogelio Antonio Jr.	Alshoha Basel (JOR); W 1.0-0.0	Quang Liem Le (VIE); L 0.0-1.0	Abdullah Hassan (UAE); D 0.5-0.5	Amanmurad Kakageldyev (TKM); W 1.0-0.0	Gundavaa Bayarsaikhan (MGL); L 0.0-1.0	Zendan Al-Zendani (YEM); W 1.0-0.0	Mohammed A-sayed (QAT); D 0.5-0.5	Ahmed Minhazuddin (BAN); D 0.5-0.5	A R Saleh Salem (UAE); W 1.0-0.0	5.5-3.5	13th

Name	Round 1	Round 2	Round 3	Round 4	Round 5	Round 6	Round 7	Round 8	Round 9	Total	Rank
Rogelio Antonio Jr. Wesley So; John Paul Gomez; Darwin Laylo; Eugene Torre	Iraq (IRQ); W 3.0-1.0	China (CHN); L 1.0-3.0	Bangladesh (BAN); W 3.0-1.0	Kazakhstan (KAZ); W 2.5-1.5	India (IND); W 2.5-1.5	Uzbekistan (UZB); W 3.5-0.5	Kyrgyzstan (KGZ); W 2.5-1.5	India (IND); W 2.5-1.5	China (CHN); L 0.5-3.5	21.0-15.0	2nd Silver

== Board Game - Xiangqi ==
2 athletes

=== Men's Individual ===
Name	Round 1	Round 2	Round 3	Round 4	Round 5	Round 6	Round 7	Total	Rank
Sandy Chua	Chun Kit Chan (HKG); L 0.0-2.0	Kam Hock Lay (MAS); L 0.0-2.0	Kam Fun Lei (MAS); L 0.0-2.0	Cham Nam Heng (CAM); W 2.0-0.0	U Long Kuok (MAC); L 0.0-2.0	Kazuharu Shoshi (JPN); W 2.0-0.0	Wan Heng Wong (MAS); L 0.0-2.0	4.0-10.0	16th
Jackson Hong	U Long Kuok (MAC); W 2.0-0.0	Thanh Bao Nguyen (VIE); L 0.0-2.0	Alvin Tsung Han Woo (SIN); D 1.0-1.0	Chung Wei Ma (TPE); L 0.0-2.0	Ly Huynh Lai (VIE); L 0.0-2.0	Chamnan Heng (CAM); L 0.0-2.0	Chhay Lay (CAM); L 0.0-2.0	3.0-11.0	18th

== Bowling ==
12 athletes

=== Men ===
Athlete	Event	Score	Rank	Medal
Engelberto Rivera	Men's Singles Squad A	1414	1st	Gold medal
Chester King	Men's Singles Squad A	1200	34th	-
Benshir Layoso	Men's Singles Squad A	1193	35th	-
Collins Jose	Men's Singles Squad A	1109	43rd	-
Frederick Ong	Men's Singles Squad B	1390	2nd	Bronze medal
Raoul Miranda	Men's Singles Squad B	1206	20th	-
Engelberto Rivera; Frederick Ong	Men's Doubles Squad B	2455	16th	-
Collins Jose; Benshir Layoso	Men's Doubles Squad B	2350	19th	-
Raoul Miranda; Chester King	Men's Doubles Squad A	2431	14th	-
Liza Del Rosario	Women's Singles A	1157	13th	-
Liza Clutario	Women's Singles A	1101	24th	-
Marianne Daisy Posadas	Women's Singles B	1183	8th	-
Kimberly Mae Lao	Women's Singles B	1166	12th	-
Lara Posadas	Women's Singles B	1124	19th	-
Krizziah Lyn Tabora	Women's Singles A	1084	22nd	-
Krizziah Lyn Tabora and Kimberly Mae Lao	Women's Doubles A	2469	5th	-
Lara Posadas and Marianne Daisy Posadas	Women's Doubles A	2342	11th	-
Liza Clutario and Liza Del Rosario	Women's Doubles B	2584	4th	-

== Boxing ==
6 athletes (including 1 female boxer)

Athlete	Event	Round of 32	Round of 16	Quarterfinals	Semifinals	Finals	Rank
Rey Saludar	52 kg	Bye	Kinley Gyeltshen (BHU); W KO R1 1:34	Puran Rai (NEP); W RSC R1 1:45	Katsuaki Susa (JPN); W 13-4	Yong Chang (CHN); W 13-11	Gold
Charly Suarez	56 kg	Daniyar Telegenov (KAZ); L 1-7	Did Not Advance				
Wilfredo Lopez	69 kg	Suruz Bangali (BAN); W 5-1	Arshad Hussein (PAK); W 12-5	Otgonjargal Jargal (MGL); L 1-7	Did Not Advance		
Victorio Saludar III	46–49 kg	Muhamad Fuad Mohd Redzuan (MAS); W 8-1	Zarip Jumayev (TKM); W 12-3	Singh Amandeeph (IND); W 6-1	Birzhan Zhakypov (KAZ); L 1-12	Did Not Advance	Bronze
Delfin Boholst	64 kg	Bye	Tuvshinbat Byamba (MGL); L 1-8	Did Not Advance			
Annie Albania	48–51 kg	Bye	Zhaina Shekerbekova (KAZ); W 9-2	Hye Song Kim (PRK); W 7-2	Aya Shinmoto (JPN); W 16-1	Cancan Ren (CHN); L 5-7	Silver

== Canoeing and Kayak Sprint ==
2 athletes

=== Men's Canoe Single 1000m ===
Dany Fuenlas

=== Men's Kayak Single 1000m ===
Alex Generalo

=== Men's Kayak Single 200m ===
Alex Generalo

== Cue Sports ==
14 athletes

=== Men's ===
Athlete	Event	Preliminary 1	Preliminary 2	Round of 16	Quarterfinals	Semifinals	Finals
Reynaldo Grandea	English Billiards Singles		Bye	Praprut Chaithanasakun (THA); L 1–3	Did not advance		
Roberto Gomez Jr.	8-Ball Pool Singles	Bye	Sumit Talwar (IND); L 5-7	Did not advance			
Efren Reyes	8-Ball Pool Singles	Bye	Alok Kumar (IND); L 3-7	Did not advance			
Marlon Manalo and Benjamin Guevarra Jr.	Snooker Team		Soheil Vahedi and Ehsan Heydari Nezhad (IRI); L 1-3	Did not advance			
Rodolfor Luat	Carom 3 Cushion Singles			The Vinh Ly (IND); L 29-40	Did Not Advance		
Reynaldo Grandea	Carom 3 Cushion Singles			Thongchai Punyawee (THA); W 40-8	Anh Vu Duong (VIE); L 18-40	Did Not Advance	
Dennis Orcollo	9-Ball Pool Singles	Bye	Odkhuu Purevsuren (MGL); W 9-2	Masaaki Tanaka (JPN); W 9-4	Phuc Long Nguyen (VIE); W 9-8	Young Hwa Jeoing (KOR)	
Warren Kiamco	9-Ball Pool Singles	Bye	Surathep Poochalam (THA); W 9-5	Chen Man Lee (HKG); W 9-3	Jinhu Dang (JPN); W 9-8	Pin Yi Ko (TPE)	

=== Women's ===
Athlete	Event	Preliminary 1	Round of 16	Quarterfinals	Semifinals	Finals
Floriza Andal and Mary Ann Basas	6-Red Snooker Team		Bye	Siming Chen and Xue Chen (CHN); L 0-3	Did Not Advance	
Iris Ranola	9-Ball Pool Singles	Haifa'a F M N A Alnaser (KUW); W 7-1	Chonticha Chitchomnart (THA); W 7-2			
Iris Ranola	8-Ball Pool Singles	Zoljargal Zorigt (MGL); W 5-3	Shu Han Chang (TPE); L 2-5	Did Not Adnvance		
Rubilen Amit	8-Ball Pool Singles	Uyanga Battulga (MGL); W 5-0	Kim Ga Young (KOR); L 2-5	Did Not Adnvance		
Rubilen Amit	9-Ball Pool Singles	Bye	Xiaoting Pan (CHN)			
Floriza Andal	6-Red Snooker Singles	Bye	Ya-Ting Chan (TPE); L 0-4	Did Not Advance		
Mary Ann Basas	6-Red Snooker Singles	Bye	Bo Ram Cha (KOR); L 3-4	Did Not Advance		

=== Men's Snooker Singles ===
Benjamin Guevarra Jr.

Marlon Manalo

=== Women's 6-Red Snooker Team ===
Floriza Andal

Mary Ann Basas

Zemonette Oryan

== Cycling - Road ==
4 athletes

=== Men's Individual Road Race ===
Lloyd Lucien Reynante

Irish Valenzuela

=== Men's Individual Time Trial ===
Lloyd Lucien Reynante

=== Women's Individual Road Race ===
Baby Marites Bitbit

=== Women's Individual Time Trial ===
Baby Marites Bitbit

== Cycling - Track ==
3 Athletes plus Baby Marites Bitbit

Name	Event	Time	Average speed (km/h)	Rank
Apryl Jessica Eppinger	Women's 500m Time Trial	37.324	48.226	9th
John Renee Mier	Men's Individual Pursuit	4:53.998	48.979	19th

=== Men's Points Race ===
John Renee Mier

George Oconer

=== Women's Points Race ===
Baby Marites Bitbit

=== Women's Sprint ===
Apryl Jessica Eppinger

== Dancesport ==
12 athletes

Name	Event	Quarterfinals	Semifinals	Finals	Rank
Anabelle Madera and Joel Madera	Waltz	7Q	7th	Did Not Advance	
Maira Rosete and Emmanuel Reyes	Tango	8Q	8th	Did Not Advance	
Maira Rosete and Emmanuel Reyes	Slow Foxtrot	7Q	8th	Did Not Advance	
Anabelle Madera and Joel Madera	Waltz	8th	Did Not Advance		
Brian Lee Calo and Jocelyn Macopia	Latin Five Dances	7Q	8th	Did Not Advance	
Dearlie Gerodias and John Erolle Melencio	Samba	6Q	7th	Did Not Advance	
Charlea Lagaras and Ronnie Steeve Vergara	Cha-cha-cha	2Q	6Q	3rd	Bronze medal
Charlea Lagaras and Ronnie Steeve Vergara	Paso Doble	5Q	6Q	3rd	Bronze medal
Dearlie Gerodias and John Erolle Melencio	Jive	8Q	8th	Did Not Advance	
Miljane Camacho and Bernie Tumarong	Standard Five Dances	-	Did Not Advance		

== Dragon Boat ==
Philippine Dragon Boat Team won't be competing in the 2010 Guangzhou Asian Games. The Philippine Olympic Committee denied the appeal of the paddlers and insisted that the team is not ready for the said competition.

=== Men's 1000m Straight Race ===
Philippine Men's Dragon Boat Team

24 Man Team

=== Men's 500m Straight Race ===
Philippine Men's Dragon Boat Team

24 Man Team

=== Men's 250m Straight Race ===
Philippine Men's Dragon Boat Team

24 Man Team

=== Women's 1000m Straight Race ===
Philippine Women's Dragon Boat Team

24 Man Team

=== Women's 500m Straight Race ===
Philippine Women's Dragon Boat Team

24 Man Team

=== Women's 250m Straight Race ===
Philippine Women's Dragon Boat Team

24 Woman Team

== Fencing ==
2 athletes

=== Men's Individual Sabre ===
Walbert Mendoza

=== Women's Individual Foil ===
Jaime Nicanor

== Golf ==
7 athletes

=== Men's Individual ===
Jerson Balasabas

Mhark Fernando

Miguel Luis Tabuena

=== Men's team ===
Jhonnel Ababa

Jerson Balasabas

Mhark Fernando

Miguel Luis Tabuena

=== Women's Individual ===
Dottie Ardina

Chihiro Ikeda

Maria Imelda Isabel Piccicio

=== Women's team ===
Dottie Ardina

Chihiro Ikeda

Maria Imelda Isabel Piccicio

== Rhythmic Gymnastics ==
1 athlete

=== Women's team ===
Maria Victoria Alicia Recinto

== Judo ==
6 athletes

=== Men ===
Athlete	Event	1/16 final	1/8 final	Quarterfinal	Semifinal	Final	Rank
John Baylon	81 kg	Bye	Jae Bum Kim (KOR); L 0-100 S4	Did Not Advance			
Kenji Yahata	100 kg	Bye	Javad Mahjoub (IRI); L 0-100	Did Not Advance			
Tomohiko Hoshina	+100 kg		Bye	Yerzhan Shynkeyev (KAZ); L 0-101 S2	Did Not Advance		
Tomohiko Hoshina	Open		Utkir Kurbanov (UZB); L 000 S1-100 S1	Did Not Advance			

Repechage

Athlete	Event	Final Repechage	Final Bronze	Rank
Tomohiko Hoshinauga	+100 kg	Shavkat Igbolov (TJK); L 010 - 011 S2	Did Not Advance	

=== Women ===
Athlete	Event	1/16 final	1/8 final	Quarterfinal	Semifinal	Final	Rank
Nancy Quillotes	48 kg		Tombi Devi (IND); L 000-100 S1	Did Not Advance			
Karen Ann Solomon	70 kg		Louize Bourached (LIB); W 010 S2-001 S3	Ye Sul Hwang (KOR); L 000-100	Did Not Advance		
Ruth Dugaduga	78 kg			X Yang (CHN); L 0-100	Did Not Advance		

Repechage

Athlete	Event	Final Repechage	Final Bronze	Rank
Ruth Dugaduga	78 kg	Dinara Kakharova (KGZ); L 000 - 010 S1	Did Not Advance	
Karen Ann Solomon	70 kg	Naranjargal Tsend Ayush (MGL); L 000 - 010 S1	Did Not Advance	

== Karate ==
4 athletes

=== Men's -67 kg ===
Rolando Lagman Jr.

=== Men's Individual Kata ===
Noel Espinosa

=== Women's -50 kg ===
Mae Soriano

=== Women's -55 kg ===
Ma. Marna Pabillore

== Rowing ==
3 athletes

=== Lightweight Men's Double Sculls ===
Roque Abala Jr.

Alvin Amposta

=== Lightweight Men's Single Sculls ===
Benjamin Tolentino

== Sailing ==
3 athletes

=== Men's Double Handed Dinghy 470 ===
Lester Troy Tayong

Emerson Villena

=== Men's RS:X ===
Reneric Moreno

== Sepaktakraw ==
3 athletes

=== Men's Double ===
Jason Huerte

Marbie Quirante

Metodio Suico Jr.

== Shooting ==
9 athletes

Athlete	Event	Qualification		Final		
Athlete	Event	Score	Rank	Score	Total	Rank
Jayson Valdez	10 m Air Rifle	585	24th	Did not advance		
Mark Lorenz Manosca	10 m Air Pistol	551	45th	Did Not Advance		
Nathaniel Padilla	25m Rapid Fire Pistol	568	18th	Did Not Advance		
Nathaniel Padilla	25m Standard Pistol					
Jayson Valdez	50 m Rifle Prone	564	53rd	Did not advance		
Alyanna Krystle Chuatoco	10m Air Pistol (W)	364	44th	Did not advance		
Charisse Palma	50m Air Pistol (W)	564	49th	Did not advance		
Alyanna Krystle Chuatoco	25m Pistol (W)	496	43rd	Did not advance		

=== Men's 50m Rifle 3 Positions ===
Jayson Valdez

=== Men's Trap ===
Eric Ang

Jethro Dionisio

Hagen Alexander Topacio

== Softball ==
15 athletes

Philippine Women's Softball Team

== Soft Tennis ==
10 athletes

=== Men's team ===
Squad list	Preliminary round		Semifinal	Final	Rank
Squad list	Group B	Rank	Semifinal	Final	Rank
Jhomar Arcilla; Joseph Arcilla; Giovanni Pietro Mamawal; Mikoff Manduriao; Samuel Noguit	South Korea; L 0-3	3rd	Did Not Advance		
Jhomar Arcilla; Joseph Arcilla; Giovanni Pietro Mamawal; Mikoff Manduriao; Samuel Noguit	Chinese Taipei; L 1-2	3rd	Did Not Advance		
Jhomar Arcilla; Joseph Arcilla; Giovanni Pietro Mamawal; Mikoff Manduriao; Samuel Noguit	India; W 3-0	3rd	Did Not Advance		
Jhomar Arcilla; Joseph Arcilla; Giovanni Pietro Mamawal; Mikoff Manduriao; Samuel Noguit	Nepal; W 3-0	3rd	Did Not Advance		

Team	Pld	W	L	MF	MA
Chinese Taipei	4	4	0	12	0
South Korea	4	3	1	9	3
Philippines	4	2	2	6	6
India	4	1	3	3	9
Nepal	4	0	4	0	12

=== Women's team ===
Squad list	Preliminary round		Semifinal	Final	Rank
Squad list	Group B	Rank	Semifinal	Final	Rank
Deena Rose Cruz; Divina Grace Escala; Cheryl Macasera; Josephine Paguyo; Noelle Conchita Corazon Zoleta	Japan; L 0-3	4th	Did Not Advance		
Deena Rose Cruz; Divina Grace Escala; Cheryl Macasera; Josephine Paguyo; Noelle Conchita Corazon Zoleta	Chinese Taipei; L 0-3	4th	Did Not Advance		
Deena Rose Cruz; Divina Grace Escala; Cheryl Macasera; Josephine Paguyo; Noelle Conchita Corazon Zoleta	North Korea; L 0-3	4th	Did Not Advance		

Team	Pld	W	L	MF	MA
Japan	3	3	0	9	0
Chinese Taipei	3	2	1	6	3
North Korea	3	1	2	3	6
Philippines	3	0	3	0	9

=== Men's doubles ===
Jhomar Arcilla

Joseph Arcilla

Giovanni Pietro Mamawal

Mikoff Manduriao

=== Men's singles ===
Joseph Arcilla

Samuel Noguit

=== Women's doubles ===
Deena Rose Cruz

Divina Grace Escala

Cheryl Macasera

Josephine Paguyo

=== Women's singles ===
Cheryl Macasera

Noelle Conchita Corazon Zoleta

=== Mixed doubles ===
Athlete	1st Round	Quarterfinal	Semifinal	Final	Rank
Samuel Noguit and Noelle Conchita Corazon Zoleta	Japan (JPN) K. Nakamoto and H. Sugimoto; L 5-0	Did Not Advance			
Jhomar Arcilla and Josephine Paguyo	Chinese Taipei (TPE)CH Li and CL Cheng; L 5-2	Did Not Advance			

== Squash ==
2 athletes

=== Women's Individual ===
Jemyca Aribado

Yvonne Alyssa Dalida

== Tennis ==
4 athletes

=== Men's doubles ===
Johnny Arcilla

Ruben Gonzales Jr.

Treat Conrad Huey

Cecil Mamiit

=== Men's singles ===
Treat Conrad Huey

Cecil Mamiit

=== Men's team ===
Squad list	First Round	Quarterfinals	Semifinal	Final	Rank
Johnny Arcilla; Ruben Gonzales Jr. Treat Conrad Huey; Cecil Mamiit	Kyrgyzstan; W 3-0	Chinese Taipei; L 1-2	Did Not Advance		

== Taekwondo ==
12 athletes

Athlete	Event	Round of 32	Round of 16	Quarterfinals	Semifinals	Finals	Rank
Paul Romero	58 kg	Hamed A Almowalad Mamdoh (KSA); W 12-2	Tan Jun Wei Jason (SIN); W 13-2	Bilguun Khosbayar (MGL); W sup 5-5	Chen yang Wei (TPE); L WDR Round 3 0:17	Did Not Advance	Bronze medal
John Paul Lizardo	54 kg	Bye	Tameem Al Kubati (YEM); W 6-4	Ajaiman A A Y A Alojaiman (SIN); W 9-4	Seong Ho Kim (KOR); L 7-10	Did Not Advance	Bronze medal

=== Men's Under 63kg ===
Tshomlee Go

=== Men's Under 68kg ===
Jeffrey Figueroa

=== Men's Under 74kg ===
Samuel Thomas Harper Morrison

=== Men's Under 80kg ===
Marlon Avenido

=== Women's Under 49kg ===
Jyra Marie Lizardo

=== Women's Under 53kg ===
Jade Zafra

=== Women's Under 57kg ===
Karla Jane Alava

=== Women's Under 62kg ===
Maria Camille Manalo

=== Women's Under 73kg ===
Kirstie Elaine Alora

== Triathlon ==
2 athletes

=== Men's Individual ===
Neil Catiil

Nikko Bryan Huelgas

== Weightlifting ==
2 athletes

=== Men's 56 kg ===
Nestor Colonia

=== Women's 58 kg ===
Hidilyn Diaz

== Wrestling ==
4 athletes

=== Men's Freestyle 55 kg ===
Jerry Angana

=== Men's Freestyle 66 kg ===
Jimmy Angana

=== Men's Greco-Roman 55 kg ===
Margarito Angana Jr.

=== Women's Freestyle 48 kg ===
Maribel Jambora

== Wushu ==
7 athletes

=== Men's ===
Athlete	Event	1/8 final	Quarterfinal	Semifinal	Final	Rank
Benjie Rivera	56 kg	Lim Seung-Chang (KOR); L 0-2	Did Not Advance			
Mark Eddiva	65 kg	Bye	Javad Aghaei (IRI); W 0-0 AV	Zhang Junyong (CHN); L 0-2	Did Not Advance	3rd Bronze
Eduard Folayang	70 kg	Zhang Yong (CHN); L 0-2	Did Not Advance			
Daniel Parantac	Taijiquan				9.15	14th

=== Women's ===
Athlete	Event	1/8 final	Quarterfinal	Semifinal	Final	Rank
Mary Jane Estimar	52 kg	Bye	Elaheh Mansourian (IRI); L 0-2	Did Not Advance		
Mariane Mariano	60 kg	Wu Tzu-yi (TPE); L 1-2	Did Not Advance			
