= Athletes from Kuwait at the 2010 Asian Games =

- IOC code: IOC
- NOC: Kuwait Olympic Committee

in Guangzhou
- Medals Ranked 15th: Gold 4 Silver 6 Bronze 3 Total 13

Asian Games appearances
- 2010

Athletes from Kuwait participated in the 16th Asian Games in Guangzhou, Guangdong, China from 12 November to 27 November 2010. These athletes competed under the Olympic flag because the Kuwait Olympic Committee had been suspended by the International Olympic Committee in January 2010 because of alleged political interference by the government. A total of 195 Kuwaiti athletes competed under the OIC flag, of which 19 were women.

== Medal table ==
Sport	Gold	Silver	Bronze	Total
Shooting	3	3	0	6
Karate	1	1	1	3
Bowling	0	2	0	2
Total	4	6	1	11

== Medalists ==
Medal	Name	Sport	Event	Date
Gold	Hamad Alnweam	Karate	Men's -75 kg	26 November
Gold	Naser Meqlad	Shooting	Men's Trap	19 November
Gold	Abdullah Al-Rashidi	Shooting	Men's Skeet	24 November
Gold	Athletes from Kuwait	Shooting	Men's Trap Team	19 November
Silver	Alrgeebah Mohammed	Bowling	Men's Single	15 November
Silver	Alrgeebah Mohammed	Bowling	Men's Masters	24 November
Silver	Abdullah Alotaibi	Karate	Men's -67 kg	25 November
Silver	Khaled Al-Mudhaf	Shooting	Men's Trap	19 November
Silver	Athletes from Kuwait	Shooting	Men's Double Trap Team	21 November
Silver	Athletes from Kuwait	Shooting	Men's Skeet Team	24 November
Bronze	Yousef Alharbi	Karate	Men's Individual Kata	24 November

== Athletics ==
The men's team comprised 23 athletes.

== Basketball ==
The men's team comprised 11 athletes.

== Bowling ==
Both men's and women's teams of 6 athletes each were sent.

== Boxing ==
A 2 member team was sent

== Cue sports ==
The team comprised 11 members (7 men and 4 women)

== Diving ==
A 4-member men's team was sent

== Football ==
A men's team of 20 was sent.

== Fencing ==
A 12-member men's team was sent.

== Artistic Gymnastics ==
A 6 member men's team was sent.

== Handball ==
The men's team comprised 16 members.

== Judo ==
Both men's (7) and women's (3) teams competed.

== Karate ==
A 4-member men's team competed.

== Rowing ==
A 3-member men's team competed.

== Shooting ==
Both men's (10) and women's (3) teams competed.

== Squash ==
A 4-member men's was sent.

== Swimming ==
A 5-member men's was sent.

== Volleyball ==
A 12-member men's team competed.

== Table Tennis ==
A 2-member men's team was sent.

== Taekwondo ==
A 6-member men's team was sent.

== Water polo ==
A 13-member men's team was sent

== Weightlifting ==
A 6-member men's team was sent

== See also ==
- Athletes from Kuwait at the 2010 Summer Youth Olympics
- Kuwait at the 2010 Asian Para Games
- Athletes from Kuwait at the 2011 Asian Winter Games
