= Macau at the 2010 Asian Games =

- IOC code: MAC
- NOC: Macau Sports and Olympic Committee

in Guangzhou
- Medals: Gold 1 Silver 1 Bronze 4 Total 6

Asian Games appearances (overview)
- 1990; 1994; 1998; 2002; 2006; 2010; 2014; 2018; 2022; 2026

Macau participated in the 16th Asian Games in Guangzhou. It won 1 gold, 1 silver and 4 bronze medals.

== Medalists ==
Medal	Name	Sport	Event	Date
Gold	Jia Rui	Wushu	Men's Daoshu and Gunshu All-Round	14 November
Silver	Cai Liangchan	Wushu	Men's Sanshou 70kg	17 November
Bronze	Lei Kuong Cheong	Karate	Men's +84 kg	24 November
Bronze	Paula Cristina Pereira	Karate	Women's +68 kg	25 November
Bronze	Cheung Pui Si	Karate	Women's Individual Kata	24 November
Bronze	Choi Sut Ian	Diving	Women's 3m Springboard	26 November
