= Singapore at the 2010 Asian Games =

- IOC code: SIN
- NOC: Singapore National Olympic Council
- Website: www.singaporeolympics.com (in English)

in Guangzhou
- Competitors: 244 in 22 sports
- Flag bearer: Jasmine Yeong-Nathan
- Medals Ranked 16th: Gold 4 Silver 7 Bronze 6 Total 17

Asian Games appearances (overview)
- 1951; 1954; 1958; 1962; 1966; 1970; 1974; 1978; 1982; 1986; 1990; 1994; 1998; 2002; 2006; 2010; 2014; 2018; 2022; 2026

Singapore participated in the 2010 Asian Games in Guangzhou, China.

== Medal table ==
Sport	Gold	Silver	Bronze	Total
Sailing	2	2	4	8
Bowling	1	3	1	5
Swimming	1	1	0	2
Table tennis	0	1	0	1
Cue sports	0	0	1	1
Total	4	7	6	17

== Medalists ==
Medal	Name	Sport	Event	Date
Gold	Tao Li	Swimming	Women's 50m Butterfly	18 November
Gold	Tan Shi Hua Cherie, Ng Su Yi Geraldline, Ng Lin Zhi Shayna	Bowling	Women's Trios	20 November
Gold	Liu Xiaman Justin, Cheng Feng Yuan Sherman	Sailing	Men's 420	20 November
Gold	Lee Qing Rachel, Low Rui Qi Cecilia	Sailing	Women's 420	20 November
Silver	Tao Li	Swimming	Women's 100m Butterfly	13 November
Silver	Feng Tianwei, Li Jiawei, Sun Beibei, Wang Yuegu, Yu Mengyu	Table Tennis	Women's Team	16 November
Silver	Ng Lin Zhi Shayna	Bowling	Women's Singles	16 November
Silver	Jason Yeong Nathan, Remy Ong	Bowling	Men's Doubles	17 November
Silver	Cheng Xinru Colin	Sailing	Men's Laser	20 November
Silver	Lim Min Kimberly	Sailing	Women's Optimist	20 November
Silver	Shi Hua Cherie Tan	Bowling	Women's masters	24 November
Bronze	Peter Gilchrist	Billiards	English Billiards	14 November
Bronze	New Hui Fen	Bowling	Women's Singles	16 November
Bronze	Lo Jun Han Ryan	Sailing	Men's Optimist	20 November
Bronze	Liu Xiaodan Dawn, Tam Shiu Wun Siobhan	Sailing	Women's 470	20 November
Bronze	Scott Glen Sydney	Sailing	Open Laser Radial	20 November
Bronze	Teo Wee Chin, Wong Ming Ho Justin	Sailing	Open Hobie 16	20 November
