= Malaysia at the 2010 Asian Games =

- IOC code: MAS
- NOC: Olympic Council of Malaysia
- Website: www.olympic.org.my (in English)

in Guangzhou
- Competitors: (196 men and 129 women) 325 in 27 sports
- Flag bearer: Koo Kien Keat
- Officials: 133
- Medals Ranked 10th: Gold 9 Silver 18 Bronze 14 Total 41

Asian Games appearances (overview)
- 1954; 1958; 1962; 1966; 1970; 1974; 1978; 1982; 1986; 1990; 1994; 1998; 2002; 2006; 2010; 2014; 2018; 2022; 2026

Other related appearances
- North Borneo (1954, 1958, 1962); Sarawak (1962)

Malaysia competed in the 2010 Asian Games in Guangzhou, China from 12 to 27 November 2010. Athletes from the Malaysia won overall 41 medals (including nine golds), and clinched tenth spot on the medal table. Zolkples Embong was the chief of the delegation.

== Medal summary ==
=== Medals by sport ===
Sport	Gold	Silver	Bronze	Total	Rank
Badminton	0	2	0	2	4
Bowling	2	1	1	4	2
Cue sports	0	1	0	1	9
Cycling	1	1	0	2	4
Diving	0	4	5	9	2
Equestrian	0	1	2	3	5
Field hockey	0	1	0	1	3
Karate	2	2	1	5	2
Sailing	0	2	1	3	7
Sepaktakraw	0	2	0	2	4
Shooting	0	0	1	1	15
Squash	3	1	2	6	1
Wushu	1	0	1	2	5
Total	9	18	14	41	10

=== Multiple medalists ===
Malaysian competitors that have won at least two medals.

Name	Sport	Gold	Silver	Bronze	Total
Alex Liew	Bowling	2	1		3
Nicol David	Squash	2			2
Adrian Ang	Bowling	1	1		2
Mohd Azlan Iskandar	Squash	1	1		2
Low Wee Wern	Squash	1		1	2
Bryan Nickson Lomas	Diving		2	1	3
Farhan Adam	Sepaktakraw		2		2
Leong Mun Yee	Diving		2		2
Mohd Normanizam Ahmad	Sepaktakraw		2		2
Muhd Futra Abdul Ghani	Sepaktakraw		2		2
Noor Azman Abdul Hamid	Sepaktakraw		2		2
Norshahruddin Mad Ghani	Sepaktakraw		2		2
Yeoh Ken Nee	Diving		1	2	3
Quzandria Nur	Equestrian		1	1	2
Ong Beng Hee	Squash		1	1	2
Pandelela Rinong	Diving		1	1	2
Qabil Ambak	Equestrian			2	2

=== Medalists ===
The following Malaysian competitors won medals at the games; all dates are for November 2010.

Medal	Name	Sport	Event	Date
Gold	Adrian Ang; Alex Liew	Bowling	Men's doubles	17
Gold	Alex Liew	Bowling	Men's all-events	22
Gold	Azizulhasni Awang	Cycling	Men's keirin	17
Gold	Ku Jin Keat	Karate	Men's individual kata	24
Gold	Puvaneswaran Ramasamy	Karate	Men's -55 kg	24
Gold	Nicol David	Squash	Women's singles	21
Gold	Mohd Azlan Iskandar	Squash	Men's singles	21
Gold	Delia Arnold; Nicol David; Low Wee Wern; Sharon Wee	Squash	Women's team	25
Gold	Chai Fong Ying	Wushu	Women's taijijian and taijiquan	15
Silver	Koo Kien Keat; Tan Boon Heong	Badminton	Men's doubles	20
Silver	Lee Chong Wei	Badminton	Men's singles	21
Silver	Ibrahim Amir	Cue sports	Men's eight ball singles	15
Silver	Aaron Kong; Adrian Ang; Alex Liew; Syafiq Ridhwan; Muhammad Nur Aiman; Zulmazran Zulkifli	Bowling	Men's team	22
Silver	Josiah Ng	Cycling	Men's keirin	17
Silver	Leong Mun Yee; Ng Yan Yee	Diving	Women's synchronized 3 metre springboard	22
Silver	Bryan Nickson Lomas; Ooi Tze Liang	Diving	Men's synchronized 10 metre platform	22
Silver	Leong Mun Yee; Pandelela Rinong	Diving	Women's synchronized 10 metre platform	23
Silver	Bryan Nickson Lomas; Yeoh Ken Nee	Diving	Men's synchronized 3 metre springboard	23
Silver	Quzandria Nur	Equestrian	Individual dressage	17
Silver	Malaysia men's national field hockey team: Amin Rahim; Azlan Misron; Azreen Rizal Nasir; Baljit Singh Charun; Faizal Saari; Hafifihafiz Hanafi; Izwan Firdaus; Kumar Subramaniam; Madzli Ikmar; Marhan Jalil; Nabil Fiqri; Razie Rahim; Roslan Jamaluddin; Shahrun Nabil; Sukri Mutalib; Tengku Ahmad Tajuddin	Field hockey	Men's tournament	25
Silver	Jamalliah Jamaludin	Karate	Women's +68 kg	25
Silver	Yamini Gopalasamy	Karate	Women's -61 kg	26
Silver	Ahmad Latif Khan	Sailing	Boys' optimist	20
Silver	Khairunnisa Mohd Afendy; Norashikin Mohamad Sayed	Sailing	Girls' 420	20
Silver	Ariff Ramli; Ahmad Sufi Mohammed Hashim; Farhan Adam; Mohammad Zulkarnain Mohamed Arif; Mohd Azman Nasruddin; Mohd Hafizie Manap; Mohd Helmi Ismail; Mohd Normanizam Ahmad; Muhammad Syazwan Husin; Muhd Futra Abdul Ghani; Noor Azman Abdul Hamid; Norshahruddin Mad Ghani	Sepaktakraw	Men's team	20
Silver	Farhan Adam; Mohd Normanizam Ahmad; Muhd Futra Abdul Ghani; Noor Azman Abdul Hamid; Norshahruddin Mad Ghani	Sepaktakraw	Men's regu	24
Silver	Ivan Yuen; Mohd Azlan Iskandar; Mohd Nafiizwan Adnan; Ong Beng Hee	Squash	Men's team	25
Bronze	Esther Cheah; Shalin Zulkifli; Sharon Koh; Sin Lin Jane; Zandra Aziela Ibrahim; Zatil Iman Abdul Ghani	Bowling	Women's team	22
Bronze	Cheong Jun Hoong	Diving	Women's 1 metre springboard	24
Bronze	Yeoh Ken Nee	Diving	Men's 1 metre springboard	24
Bronze	Pandelela Rinong	Diving	Women's 10 metre platform	25
Bronze	Yeoh Ken Nee	Diving	Men's 3 metre springboard	25
Bronze	Bryan Nickson Lomas	Diving	Men's 10 metre platform	26
Bronze	Diani Lee Cheng; Quzandria Nur; Qabil Ambak; Putri Alia Soraya	Equestrian	Team dressage	14
Bronze	Qabil Ambak	Equestrian	Individual dressage	17
Bronze	Lim Lee Lee	Karate	Women's individual kata	24
Bronze	Ku Anas Ku Zamil; Mohamad Hafizuddin Mazelan	Sailing	Boys' 420	20
Bronze	Nur Suryani Taibi	Shooting	Women's 10 metre air rifle	13
Bronze	Low Wee Wern	Squash	Women's singles	21
Bronze	Ong Beng Hee	Squash	Men's singles	21
Bronze	Tai Cheau Xuen	Wushu	Women's nandao and nanquan	13

== Aquatics ==
=== Diving ===
Men

Athlete	Event	Preliminary		Final	
Athlete	Event	Score	Rank	Score	Rank
Muhammad Fakhrul Izzat Md Zain	1 m springboard	—N/a		361.35	5
Yeoh Ken Nee	1 m springboard	—N/a		391.10	3rd place, bronze medalist(s)
Bryan Nickson Lomas	3 m springboard	414.95	6 Q	412.80	5
Yeoh Ken Nee	3 m springboard	445.90	3 Q	439.45	3rd place, bronze medalist(s)
Bryan Nickson Lomas	10 m platform	451.60	3 Q	478.60	3rd place, bronze medalist(s)
Ooi Tze Liang	10 m platform	411.45	6 Q	397.10	8
Bryan Nickson Lomas; Yeoh Ken Nee	3 m synchronized springboard	—N/a		404.85	2nd place, silver medalist(s)
Bryan Nickson Lomas; Ooi Tze Liang	10 m synchronized platform	—N/a		407.16	2nd place, silver medalist(s)

Women

Athlete	Event	Preliminary		Final	
Athlete	Event	Score	Rank	Score	Rank
Cheong Jun Hoong	1 m springboard	—N/a		271.60	3rd place, bronze medalist(s)
Leong Mun Yee	1 m springboard	—N/a		268.20	4
Leong Mun Yee	3 m springboard	Did not start		Did not advance	
Ng Yan Yee	3 m springboard	Did not start		Did not advance	
Pandelela Rinong	10 m platform	351.50	3 Q	344.45	3rd place, bronze medalist(s)
Traisy Vivien Tukiet	10 m platform	281.25	7 Q	255.90	9
Leong Mun Yee; Ng Yan Yee	3 m synchronized springboard	—N/a		279.90	2nd place, silver medalist(s)
Leong Mun Yee; Pandelela Rinong	10 m synchronized platform	—N/a		311.94	2nd place, silver medalist(s)

=== Swimming ===
Men

Athlete	Event	Heats		Final	
Athlete	Event	Time	Overall rank	Time	Rank
Foo Jian Beng	50 m freestyle	24.05	20	Did not advance	
Daniel Bego	100 m freestyle	51.22	12	Did not advance	
Foo Jian Beng	100 m freestyle	51.71	15	Did not advance	
Kevin Lim Kar Meng	400 m freestyle	4:13.93	21	Did not advance	
Kevin Yeap	400 m freestyle	4:02.67	10	Did not advance	
Kevin Yeap	1500 m freestyle	—N/a		15:53.34	6
Ian James Barr Kumarakulasinghe	50 m backstroke	27.46	16	Did not advance	
Ian James Barr Kumarakulasinghe	100 m backstroke	57.94	12	Did not advance	
Ian James Barr Kumarakulasinghe	200 m backstroke	2:06.52	13	Did not advance	
Yap See Tuan	50 m breaststroke	29.81	19	Did not advance	
Yap See Tuan	100 m breaststroke	1:04.23	10	Did not advance	
Yap See Tuan	200 m breaststroke	2:19.77	9	Did not advance	
Daniel Bego	50 m butterfly	25.15	11	Did not advance	
Daniel Bego	100 m butterfly	55.00	12	Did not advance	
Daniel Bego	200 m butterfly	2:01.52	7 Q	2:01.02	7
Kevin Lim Kar Meng	200 m butterfly	2:08.59	16	Did not advance	
Ian James Barr Kumarakulasinghe	200 m individual medley	2:08.46	14	Did not advance	
Daniel Bego; Foo Jian Beng; Kevin Lim Kar Meng; Kevin Yeap	4 × 100 m freestyle relay	3:32.69	11	Did not advance	
Daniel Bego; Foo Jian Beng; Ian James Barr Kumarakulasinghe; Kevin Lim Kar Meng; Kevin Yeap	4 × 200 m freestyle relay	7:39.54	8 Q	7:35.66	6
Daniel Bego; Foo Jian Beng; Ian James Barr Kumarakulasinghe; Yap See Tuan	4 × 100 m medley relay	3:49.82	9	Did not advance	

Women

Athlete	Event	Heats		Final	
Athlete	Event	Time	Overall rank	Time	Rank
Chui Lai Kwan	50 m freestyle	26.21	7 Q	26.08	7
Leung Chii Lin	50 m freestyle	26.97	13	Did not advance	
Chui Lai Kwan	100 m freestyle	57.98	11	Did not advance	
Leung Chii Lin	100 m freestyle	58.92	15	Did not advance	
Khoo Cai Lin	400 m freestyle	4:22.29	7 Q	4:18.71	5
Khoo Cai Lin	800 m freestyle	—N/a		8:54.34	7
Chan Kah Yan	50 m backstroke	30.15	10	Did not advance	
Chan Kah Yan	100 m backstroke	1:05.27	10	Did not advance	
Christina Loh	50 m breaststroke	33.22	11	Did not advance	
Erika Kong Chia Chia	50 m breaststroke	33.74	13	Did not advance	
Christina Loh	100 m breaststroke	1:13.50	12	Did not advance	
Erika Kong Chia Chia	100 m breaststroke	1:13.79	13	Did not advance	
Christina Loh	200 m breaststroke	2:40.54	13	Did not advance	
Erika Kong Chia Chia	200 m breaststroke	2:40.76	14	Did not advance	
Chan Kah Yan; Chui Lai Kwan; Khoo Cai Lin; Leung Chii Lin	4 × 100 m freestyle relay	—N/a		3:52.98	7
Chan Kah Yan; Christina Loh; Chui Lai Kwan; Khoo Cai Lin	4 × 100 m medley relay	—N/a		4:23.57	7

=== Synchronized swimming ===
Women

Athlete	Event	Technical routine		Free routine		Total points	Rank
Athlete	Event	Score	Rank	Score	Rank	Total points	Rank
Png Hui Chuen; Katrina Ann Hadi; Zyanne Lee Zhien Huey	Duet	77.250	6	77.500	6	154.750	6

== Archery ==
Men's recurve

Athlete	Event	Qualification		1/32 elimination	1/16 elimination	1/8 elimination	1/4 elimination	1/2 elimination	Final	Rank
Athlete	Event	Score	Seed	Opposition Score	Opposition Score	Opposition Score	Opposition Score	Opposition Score	Opposition Score	Rank
Arif Farhan Ibrahim Putra	Individual	1239	45	Did not advance						
Cheng Chu Sian	Individual	1325	15 Q	Bye	Ashim Serchan (NEP); W 4 – 0; 55-54, 57-56	Tarundeep Rai (IND); L 2 – 6; 28-29, 28-30, 28-27, 28-29	Did not advance			
Izzudin Abdul Rahim	Individual	1305	23 Q	Bye	Zaw Win Htike (MYA); W 4 – 0; 57-53, 58-51	Oh Jin-hyek (KOR); L 3 – 7; 29-26, 28-28, 25-27, 27-30, 28-30	Did not advance			
Wan Khalmizam	Individual	1249	43	Did not advance						
Arif Farhan Ibrahim Putra; Cheng Chu Sian; Izzudin Abdul Rahim; Wan Khalmizam	Team	3869	7 Q	—N/a		Myanmar; W 217 – 207	China; L 220 – 224	Did not advance		

== Athletics ==
Key

- Note–Ranks given for track events are within the athlete's heat only
- Q = Qualified for the next round
- q = Qualified for the next round as a fastest loser or, in field events, by position without achieving the qualifying target
- NR = National record
- PB = Personal best
- SB = Season's best
- N/A = Round not applicable for the event
- Bye = Athlete not required to compete in round

Men
Field event

Athlete	Event	Qualification		Final	
Athlete	Event	Distance	Rank	Distance	Rank
Lee Hup Wei	High jump	2.15	=9 q	2.15	9

Women
Track events

Athlete	Event	Round 1			Semifinal			Final	
Athlete	Event	Time	Rank	Overall rank	Time	Rank	Overall rank	Time	Rank
Nurul Sarah Abdul Kadir	100 m	11.99	3 Q	12	11.91 SB	7	13	Did not advance	
Siti Zubaidah Adabi	100 m	12.01	4	14 q	11.93	8	15	Did not advance	
Noraseela Mohd Khalid	400 m hurdles	58.16 SB	4	8 q	—N/a			57.22 SB	5
Nurul Sarah Abdul Kadir; Siti Zubaidah Adabi; Norjannah Hafiszah Jamaluddin; Yee Lee Heng	4 × 100 m relay	45.50	4	7 q	—N/a			45.54	6

Field event

Athlete	Event	Qualification		Final	
Athlete	Event	Distance	Rank	Distance	Rank
Roslinda Samsu	Pole vault	—N/a		4.00	5

== Badminton ==
Singles

Athlete	Event	Round of 32	Round of 16	Quarterfinals	Semifinals	Final	Rank
Athlete	Event	Opposition Score	Opposition Score	Opposition Score	Opposition Score	Opposition Score	Rank
Lee Chong Wei (1)	Men's singles	Bye	Chan Yan Kit (HKG); W 2 - 1; 17-21, 21-9, 21-6	Boonsak Ponsana (THA); W 2 - 0; 21-13, 21-17	Chen Jin (CHN); W 2 - 1; 14-21, 21-15, 21-7	Gold medal match Lin Dan (CHN); L 1 - 2; 13-21, 21-15, 10-21	2nd place, silver medalist(s)
Muhammad Hafiz Hashim	Men's singles	Bikash Shrestha (NEP); W 2 - 0; 21-10, 21-8	Park Sung-hwan (KOR); L 0 - 2; 18-21, 16-21	Did not advance			
Lydia Cheah Li Ya	Women's singles	Vu Thi Trang (VIE); W 2 - 1; 21-13, 18-21, 21-7	Saina Nehwal (IND); L 0 - 2; 15-21, 17-21	Did not advance			
Wong Mew Choo (8)	Women's singles	Bye	Adriyanti Firdasari (INA); W 2 - 0; 21-19, 21-18	Eriko Hirose (JPN); L 0 - 2; 20-22, 11-21	Did not advance		

Doubles

Athlete	Event	Round of 32	Round of 16	Quarterfinals	Semifinals	Final	Rank
Athlete	Event	Opposition Score	Opposition Score	Opposition Score	Opposition Score	Opposition Score	Rank
Koo Kien Keat; Tan Boon Heong (1)	Men's doubles	Bye	Rupesh Kumar (IND); Sanave Thomas (IND); W 2 - 0; 21-15, 21-19	Hirokatsu Hashimoto (JPN); Noriyasu Hirata (JPN); W 2 - 1; 21-19, 13-21, 21-18	Mohammad Ahsan (INA); Alvent Yulianto (INA); W 2 - 0; 21-19, 21-16	Gold medal match Markis Kido (INA); Hendra Setiawan (INA); L 1 - 2; 21-16, 24-26, 19-21	2nd place, silver medalist(s)
Mak Hee Chun; Tan Wee Kiong	Men's doubles	Hiroyuki Endo (JPN); Kenichi Hayakawa (JPN); L 0 - 2; 17-21, 6-21	Did not advance				
Vivian Hoo Kah Mun; Lim Yin Loo	Women's doubles	Long Ying (MAC); Mak Ka Lei (MAC); W 2 - 0; 21-9, 21-12	Shinta Mulia Sari (SIN); Yao Lei (SIN); L 0 - 2; 16-21, 16-21	Did not advance			
Marylen Ng; Woon Khe Wei	Women's doubles	Aparna Balan (IND); Prajakta Sawant (IND); W 2 - 0; 21-17, 21-7	Ha Jung-eun (KOR); Lee Kyung-won (KOR); L 0 - 2; 8-21, 15-21	Did not advance			
Chan Peng Soon; Goh Liu Ying	Mixed doubles	Shin Baek-cheol (KOR); Lee Hyo-jung (KOR); L 0 - 2; 10-21, 14-21	Did not advance				
Koo Kien Keat; Woon Khe Wei	Mixed doubles	Tontowi Ahmad (INA); Lilyana Natsir (INA); L 0 - 2; 10-21, 9-21	Did not advance				

=== Men's team ===
Quarterfinal

13 November	Thailand	3–2	Malaysia

Boonsak Ponsana	2–1	Lee Chong Wei	9–21, 21–10, 21–19
Sudket Prapakamol / Songphon Anugritayawon	0–2	Koo Kien Keat / Tan Boon Heong	12–21, 13–21
Tanongsak Saensomboonsuk	1–2	Mohd Hafiz Hashim	21–14, 14–21, 18–21
Maneepong Jongjit / Bodin Issara	2–1	Mak Hee Chun / Tan Wee Kiong	21–23, 21–12, 21–16
Suppanyu Avihingsanon	2–0	Liew Daren	21–16, 21–16

=== Women's team ===
Round of 16

13 November	Hong Kong	1–3	Malaysia

Yip Pui Yin	1–2	Wong Mew Choo	22–20, 18–21, 18–21
Chan Tsz Ka	2–1	Lydia Cheah Li Ya	10–21, 21–17, 21–19
Tse Ying Suet	1–2	Tee Jing Yi	21–19, 6–21, 13–21
Chau Hoi Wah / Chan Tsz Ka	1–2	Vivian Hoo Kah Mun / Lim Yin Loo	21–17, 18–21, 18–21

Quarterfinal

13 November	South Korea	3–0	Malaysia

Bae Youn-joo	2–1	Wong Mew Choo	21–17, 16–21, 21–14
Ha Jung-eun / Lee Kyung-won	2–0	Vivian Hoo Kah Mun / Lim Yin Loo	21–13, 21–8
Sung Ji-hyun	2–0	Lydia Cheah Li Ya	21–14, 21–15

== Board games ==
=== Chess ===
Athlete	Event	Round 1	Round 2	Round 3	Round 4	Round 5	Rank
Athlete	Event	Round 6	Round 7	Round 8	Round 9	Total points	Rank
Mok Tze Meng	Men's individual rapid	Rustam Kasimdzhanov (UZB); L 0.0–1.0	Modallal Tarek (LIB); L 0.0–1.0	Ni Hua (CHN); L 0.0–1.0	Ali Abdul Rahman (MDV); L 0.0–1.0	Araz Bassim (IRQ); W 1.0–0.0	38; Current rating: 2394; Current title: International Master (IM)
Mok Tze Meng	Men's individual rapid	Anton Filipov (UZB); W 1.0-0.0	Namkhai Battulga (MGL); L 0.0-1.0	Basheer Al-Qudaimi (YEM); W 1.0-0.0	Ahmed Abdul Wahab (IRQ); L 0.0-1.0	3.0	38; Current rating: 2394; Current title: International Master (IM)
Alia Anin Azwa Bakri	Women's individual rapid	Zhu Chen (QAT); L 0.0–1.0	Salama Al-Khelaifi (QAT); L 0.0–1.0	Atousa Pourkashiyan (IRI); L 0.0–1.0	Altanulzii Enkhtuul (MGL); W 1.0–0.0	Alshaeby Boshra (JOR); W 1.0–0.0	29; Current rating: 1953; Current title: Women FIDE Master (WFM)
Alia Anin Azwa Bakri	Women's individual rapid	Narumi Uchida (JPN); D 0.5-0.5	Rayah Nuimat (JOR); W 1.0-0.0	Hallaeya Bahar (TKM); L 0.0-1.0	Delbak Ismail Ibrahim (IRQ); W 1.0-0.0	3.5	29; Current rating: 1953; Current title: Women FIDE Master (WFM)
Nur Nabila Azman Hisham	Women's individual rapid	Nguyen Pham Le Thao (VIE); L 0.0–1.0	Hallaeya Bahar (TKM); W 1.0–0.0	Kim Hyoyoung (KOR); W 1.0–0.0	Salama Al-Khelaifi (QAT); L 0.0–1.0	Sultana Sharmin Shirin (BAN); W 1.0–0.0	22; Current rating: 1845; Current title: Not available
Nur Nabila Azman Hisham	Women's individual rapid	Atousa Pourkashiyan (IRI); W 1.0-0.0	Nodira Nadirjanova (UZB); W 1.0-0.0	Akter Liza Shamima (BAN); W 1.0-0.0	Guliskhan Nakhbayeva (KAZ); W 1.0-0.0	3.5	22; Current rating: 1845; Current title: Not available

=== Weiqi ===
Athlete	Event	Round 1	Round 2	Round 3	Round 4	Rank
Athlete	Event	Round 5	Round 6	Round 7	Total points	Rank
Kew Chien Chong; Koh Song Sang; Orpheus Leong; Mohd Zaid Waqiyuddin Mohd Zulkifli; Teng Boon Ping; Tiong Kee Soon	Men's team	Chinese Taipei; L 0.0–2.0	Thailand; L 0.0–2.0	Japan; L 0.0–2.0	Bye; W 2.0–0.0	7
Kew Chien Chong; Koh Song Sang; Orpheus Leong; Mohd Zaid Waqiyuddin Mohd Zulkifli; Teng Boon Ping; Tiong Kee Soon	Men's team	Vietnam; L 0.0–2.0	China; L 0.0–2.0	South Korea; L 0.0–2.0	2.0	7
Chow Zhi Mei; Fong Sok Nee; Lim Shu Wen; Suzanne Low	Women's team	North Korea; L 0.0–2.0	Thailand; W 2.0–0.0	China; L 0.0–2.0	Chinese Taipei; L 0.0–2.0	6
Chow Zhi Mei; Fong Sok Nee; Lim Shu Wen; Suzanne Low	Women's team	Bye; W 2.0–0.0	Japan; L 0.0–2.0	South Korea; L 0.0–2.0	4.0	6
Mohd Zaid Waqiyuddin Mohd Zulkifli; Fong Sok Nee	Mixed pair	Chang Hsu (TPE); Hsieh Yi Min (TPE); L 0.0–2.0	Kim Yu Mi (PRK); Ri Kwang Hyok (PRK); L 0.0–2.0	Yang Shi Hai (HKG); Kan Ying (HKG); L 0.0–2.0	Bye; W 2.0–0.0	17
Mohd Zaid Waqiyuddin Mohd Zulkifli; Fong Sok Nee	Mixed pair	Shinji Takao (JPN); Chiaki Mukai (JPN); L 0.0–2.0	Apidet Jirasophin (THA); Waraphan Nawaruk (THA); L 0.0–2.0	—N/a	2.0	17

=== Xiangqi ===
Athlete	Event	Round 1	Round 2	Round 3	Round 4	Rank
Athlete	Event	Round 5	Round 6	Round 7	Total points	Rank
Lay Kam Hock	Men's individual	Wu Kui Lin (TPE); L 0.0–2.0	Sandy Chua (PHI); W 2.0–0.0	Wong Wan Heng (MAS); L 0.0–2.0	Lay Chhay (CAM); D 1.0–1.0	12
Lay Kam Hock	Men's individual	Kazuharu Shoshi (JPN); W 2.0–0.0	Chiu Yu Kuen (HKG); L 0.0–2.0	Chan Chun Kit (HKG); D 1.0–1.0	6.0	12
Wong Wan Heng	Men's individual	Lai Ly Huynh (VIE); L 0.0–2.0	Kuok U Long (MAC); W 2.0–0.0	Lay Kam Hock (MAS); W 2.0–0.0	Alvin Woo Tsung Han (SIN); D 1.0–1.0	11
Wong Wan Heng	Men's individual	Chiu Yu Kuen (HKG); L 0.0–2.0	Lei Kam Fun (MAC); L 0.0–2.0	Sandy Chua (PHI); W 2.0–0.0	7.0	11

== Bowling ==
Singles

Player	Event	Squad A		Squad B		Final rank
Player	Event	Score	Rank	Score	Rank	Final rank
Aaron Kong Eng Chuan	Men's singles			1339	8	12
Adrian Ang	Men's singles			1287	12	23
Alex Liew Kien Liang	Men's singles			1354	6	10
Syafiq Ridhwan	Men's singles	1287	12			23
Muhammad Nur Aiman Muhd Khairuddin	Men's singles	1294	11			22
Zulmazran Zulkifli	Men's singles			1216	17	45
Esther Cheah Mei Lan	Women's singles	1136	19			36
Shalin Zulkifli	Women's singles	1124	21			38
Sharon Koh Suet Lan	Women's singles			1318	1	5
Sin Lin Jane	Women's singles	1161	12			25
Zandra Aziela Ibrahim	Women's singles	1182	11			20
Zatil Iman Abdul Ghani	Women's singles			1180	9	21

Doubles

Player	Event	Squad A		Squad B		Final rank
Player	Event	Score	Rank	Score	Rank	Final rank
Aaron Kong Eng Chuan; Zulmazran Zulkifli	Men's doubles	2467	9			25
Adrian Ang; Alex Liew Kien Liang	Men's doubles	2711	1			1st place, gold medalist(s)
Syafiq Ridhwan; Muhammad Nur Aiman Muhd Khairuddin	Men's doubles			2420	17	33
Esther Cheah Mei Lan; Shalin Zulkifli	Women's doubles			2432	7	13
Sharon Koh Suet Lan; Zatil Iman Abdul Ghani	Women's doubles	2428	7			14
Sin Lin Jane; Zandra Aziela Ibrahim	Women's doubles	2344	10			18

Trios

Player	Event	Block 1		Block 2		Total	Final rank
Player	Event	Score	Rank	Score	Rank	Total	Final rank
Aaron Kong Eng Chuan; Adrian Ang; Alex Liew Kien Liang	Men's trios	1853	12	1993	2	3846	6
Syafiq Ridhwan; Muhammad Nur Aiman Muhd Khairuddin; Zulmazran Zulkifli	Men's trios	1877	11	1899	8	3776	9
Esther Cheah Mei Lan; Shalin Zulkifli; Sharon Koh Suet Lan	Women's trios	1991	4	1829	6	3820	4
Sin Lin Jane; Zandra Aziela Ibrahim; Zatil Iman Abdul Ghani	Women's trios	1838	9	1898	2	3736	7

Team

Player	Event	Block 1		Block 2		Total	Final rank
Player	Event	Score	Rank	Score	Rank	Total	Final rank
Aaron Kong Eng Chuan; Adrian Ang; Alex Liew Kien Liang; Syafiq Ridhwan; Muhammad Nur Aiman Muhd Khairuddin; Zulmazran Zulkifli	Men's team	3355	1	3224	4	6579	2nd place, silver medalist(s)
Esther Cheah Mei Lan; Shalin Zulkifli; Sharon Koh Suet Lan; Zandra Aziela Ibrahim; Zatil Iman Abdul Ghani; Sin Lin Jane	Women's team	3083	3	3212	3	6295	3rd place, bronze medalist(s)

All-events

Player	Event	Final					Final rank
Player	Event	Singles	Doubles	Trios	Team	Total	Final rank
Aaron Kong Eng Chuan	Men's all-events	1339	1246	1278	1467	5330	4
Adrian Ang	Men's all-events	1287	1372	1238	1236	5133	21
Alex Liew Kien Liang	Men's all-events	1354	1339	1330	1425	5448	1st place, gold medalist(s)
Syafiq Ridhwan	Men's all-events	1287	1201	1333	1261	5082	28
Muhammad Nur Aiman Muhd Khairuddin	Men's all-events	1294	1219	1240	1190	4943	46
Zulmazran Zulkifli	Men's all-events	1216	1221	1203	1299	4939	48
Esther Cheah Mei Lan	Women's all-events	1136	1187	1299	1435	5057	8
Shalin Zulkifli	Women's all-events	1124	1245	1256	1189	4814	28
Sharon Koh Suet Lan	Women's all-events	1318	1224	1265	1243	5050	9
Sin Lin Jane	Women's all-events	1161	1169	1197	1202	4729	36
Zandra Aziela Ibrahim	Women's all-events	1182	1175	1323	1215	4895	21
Zatil Iman Abdul Ghani	Women's all-events	1180	1204	1216	1213	4813	29

Masters

Player	Event	Preliminary		Stepladder finals	
Player	Event	Score	Rank	Score	Final rank
Aaron Kong Eng Chuan	Men's masters	3335	13	Did not advance	
Alex Liew Kien Liang	Men's masters	3655	5	Did not advance	
Esther Cheah Mei Lan	Women's masters	3439	5	Did not advance	
Sharon Koh Suet Lan	Women's masters	3464	4	Did not advance	

== Boxing ==
Men

Athlete	Event	Round of 32	Round of 16	Quarterfinals	Semifinals	Final	
Athlete	Event	Opposition Result	Opposition Result	Opposition Result	Opposition Result	Opposition Result	Rank
Muhamad Fuad Mohd Redzuan	Light flyweight (49 kg)	Victorio Saludar (PHI); L 1 - 8	Did not advance				
Khir Akyazlan Azmi	Light welterweight (64 kg)	Bye	Santosh Kumar (IND); L 1 - 6	Did not advance			
Farkhan Haron	Welterweight (69 kg)	Ratna Bahadur Tamang (NEP); W 5 - 2	Serik Sapiyev (KAZ); L RSC	Did not advance			
Mohamad Fairuz Azwan	Middleweight (75 kg)	Bye	Waheed Abdul-Ridha (IRQ); L 5 - 12	Did not advance			

== Cricket ==
=== Men's tournament ===
Squad list	Preliminary		Quarterfinals	Semifinals	Final	Rank
Squad list	Pool C	Rank	Quarterfinals	Semifinals	Final	Rank
Faris Almas; Rakesh Madhavan; Shukri Rahim; Shafiq Sharif; Ahmad Faiz; Shahrulnizam Yusof; Derek Duraisingam; Nik Arifin; Manrick Singh; Eszrafiq Azis; Aminuddin Ramly; Ariffin Ramly; Suresh Navaratnam; Suhan Alagaratnam; Anwar Arudin; Coach: Rajiv Seth	China; W 162/8 (20 overs) - 73/8 (20 overs)	1 Q	Bangladesh; L 80/10 (19.4 overs) - 150/7 (20 overs)	Did not advance		7

=== Women's tournament ===
Squad list	Preliminary		Quarterfinals	Semifinals	Final	Rank
Squad list	Pool A	Pool G	Quarterfinals	Semifinals	Final	Rank
Norlida Abdul Hamid; Norasyikin Abdul Razak; Zaibibiana Affandi; Nurroikha Choiri; Dewi Idora Chunam; Jennifer Francis; Intan Jamahidayu Jaafar; Nur Amirah Kamarudin; Mariana Lakie; Emylia Eliani Md Rahim; Rewina Mohammad; Nurul Azwin Mohd Arifin; Siti Mazila Mohd Hanafi; Alessandra Lise Shunmugam; Nur Aishah Sua Gile	China; L 61/8 (20 overs) - 166/6 (20 overs)	Thailand; L 63 (16.2 overs) - 94/8 (20 overs)	Did not advance			7

== Cue sports ==
Men

Athlete	Event	Preliminary	Round of 32	Round of 16	Quarterfinals	Semifinals	Final	Rank
Athlete	Event	Opposition Score	Opposition Score	Opposition Score	Opposition Score	Opposition Score	Opposition Score	Rank
Ibrahim Amir	Eight-ball singles	Bye	Mohammed Ahmed Al-Binali (QAT); W 7 - 4	Hisataka Kamihashi (JPN); W 7 - 6	Omar Al-Shaheen (KUW); W 7 - 4	Irsal Nasution (INA); W 7 - 5	Gold medal match Kuo Po-cheng (TPE); L 4 - 7	2nd place, silver medalist(s)
Lee Poh Soon	Eight-ball singles	Bye	Badr Abdullah Al-Hamdan (KSA); W 7 - 6	Alok Kumar (IND); L 5 - 7	Did not advance			
Ibrahim Amir	Nine-ball singles	Chan Keng Kwang (SIN); L 3 - 9	Did not advance					
Lee Poh Soon	Nine-ball singles	Bye	Hisataka Kamihashi (JPN); L 7 - 9	Did not advance				
Moh Keen Hoo	Snooker singles	Khurram Hussain Agha (PAK); L 2 - 4; 10-51, 57-40, 67-54, 12-100, 13-70, 44-84	Did not advance					
Thor Chuan Leong	Snooker singles	Bye	Baek Min-hu (KOR); W 4 - 1; 77-0, 83-10, 57-65, 78-17, 62-28	Ang Boon Chin (SIN); L 2 - 4; 21-57, 58-70, 66-15, 92-14, 5-64, 0-64	Did not advance			
Moh Keen Hoo; Thor Chuan Leong (4)	Snooker team	—N/a	Bye	Thailand; L 0 - 3; 8-74, 40-79, 0-77	Did not advance			

Women

Athlete	Event	Preliminary	Round of 32	Round of 16	Quarterfinals	Semifinals	Final	Rank
Athlete	Event	Opposition Score	Opposition Score	Opposition Score	Opposition Score	Opposition Score	Opposition Score	Rank
Esther Kwan Suet Yee	Eight-ball singles	—N/a	Nourah Al-Busaili (KUW); W W/O	Charlene Chai (SIN); L 2 - 5	Did not advance			
Suhana Dewi Sabtu	Eight-ball singles	—N/a	Cha Yu-ram (KOR); L 3 - 5	Did not advance				
Esther Kwan Suet Yee (2)	Nine-ball singles	—N/a	Bye	Kim Ga-young (KOR); L 3 - 7	Did not advance			
Suhana Dewi Sabtu	Nine-ball singles	—N/a	Cha Yu-ram (KOR); L 3 - 7	Did not advance				

== Cycling ==
=== Mountain bike ===
Athletes	Event	Time	Rank
Masziyaton Mohd Radzi	Women's cross-country	-4 laps	6

=== Road ===
Athletes	Event	Time	Rank
Anuar Manan	Men's individual road race	4:14:59.24	18
Adiq Husainie Othman	Men's individual road race	4:15:15.80	28
Ng Yong Li	Men's individual time trial	1:12:25.16	9
Noor Azian Alias	Women's individual road race	2:47:48.70	12
Mariana Mohammad	Women's individual road race	Did not start	
Mariana Mohammad	Women's individual time trial	Did not finish	

=== Track ===
Sprint

Athlete	Event	Qualifying		1/16 final	1/8 final	Quarterfinal	Semifinal	Final	
Athlete	Event	Time	Rank	Opposition Time	Opposition Time	Opposition Time	Opposition Time	Opposition Time	Rank
Azizulhasni Awang	Men's sprint	10.361	3 Q	Ayman Al-Habriti (KSA); W 11.846	Son Gyeong-su (KOR); W 11.115	Hassan Ali Varposhti (IRI); W 10.781, W 10.928	Tsubasa Kitatsuru (JPN); L, W 10.449, L	Bronze medal match Yudai Nitta (JPN); L, L	4
Edrus Yunus	Men's sprint	10.514	7 Q	Hsiao Shih-hsin (TPE); W 12.286	Hassan Ali Varposhti (IRI); L	Bye		9th – 12th classification Son Gyeong-su (KOR); Badr Ali Shambih (UAE); Hsiao Shih-hsin (TPE); L	11
Edrus Yunus	Men's sprint	10.514	7 Q	Hsiao Shih-hsin (TPE); W 12.286	Repechage; Farshid Farsinejadian (IRI); Badr Ali Shambih (UAE); L	Bye		9th – 12th classification Son Gyeong-su (KOR); Badr Ali Shambih (UAE); Hsiao Shih-hsin (TPE); L	11
Josiah Ng; Mohd Rizal Tisin; Edrus Yunus	Men's team sprint	45.118	4 q	—N/a				Bronze medal match Iran (IRI); Farshid Farsinejadian; Hassan Ali Varposhti; Mahmoud Parash; L 45.175	4
Fatehah Mustapa	Women's sprint	11.872	9 Q	—N/a	Lee Eun-ji (KOR); W 12.122	Kim Won-gyeong (KOR); L	Bye	5th – 8th classification Lee Eun-ji (KOR); Meng Zhao Juan (HKG); Huang Ting-ying (TPE); L	6

Pursuit

Athlete	Event	Qualifying		Round 1		Final	
Athlete	Event	Time	Rank	Opposition Time	Rank	Opposition Time	Rank
Mohammad Akmal Amrun	Men's individual pursuit	4:41.334	11	Did not advance			
Adiq Husainie Othman; Amir Mustafa Rusli; Mohamed Harrif Salleh; Mohammad Akmal Amrun; Mohd Rizal Tisin	Men's team pursuit	4:20.340	4 Q	Iran (IRI); Abbas Saeidi Tanha; Alireza Haghi; Amir Zargari; Mehdi Sohrabi; L 4:18.596	5	Did not advance	
Kimbeley Yap	Women's individual pursuit	4:03.613	12	Did not advance			

Time trial

Athlete	Event	Time Speed (km/h)	Rank
Fatehah Mustapa	Women's 500 m time trial	35.769	4

Points race

Athlete	Event	Qualification		Final	
Athlete	Event	Points	Rank	Points	Rank
Amir Mustafa Rusli	Men's points race	46	2 Q	1	14
Adiq Husainie Othman	Men's points race	7	4 Q	56	5
Kimbeley Yap	Women's points race	—N/a		0	10

Keirin

Athlete	Event	Round 1		Repechage 1		Round 2		Final	
Athlete	Event	Opposition Time	Rank	Opposition Time	Rank	Opposition Time	Rank	Opposition Time	Rank
Azizulhasni Awang	Men's keirin	Zhang Miao (CHN); Kota Asai (JPN); Mahmoud Parash (IRI); Wu Po-hung (TPE); Raja Audi (LIB); L	2 Q	Bye		Kazunari Watanabe (JPN); Josiah Ng (MAS); Choi Lae-seon (KOR); Hylem Prince (IND); Mahmoud Parash (IRI); L	3 Q	1st – 6th classification Josiah Ng (MAS); Zhang Miao (CHN); Kazunari Watanabe (JPN); Zhang Lei (CHN); Mohammad Parash (IRI); W	1st place, gold medalist(s)
Josiah Ng	Men's keirin	Zhang Lei (CHN); Choi Lae-seon (KOR); Liao Kuo-lung (TPE); Okram Bikram Singh (IND); Jaber Majrashi (KSA); L	2 Q	Bye		Kazunari Watanabe (JPN); Azizulhasni Awang (MAS); Choi Lae-seon (KOR); Hylem Prince (IND); Mahmoud Parash (IRI); L	2 Q	1st – 6th classification Azizulhasni Awang (MAS); Zhang Miao (CHN); Kazunari Watanabe (JPN); Zhang Lei (CHN); Mohammad Parash (IRI); L	2nd place, silver medalist(s)

== Equestrian ==
Dressage

Athlete	Horse	Event	Qualifier		Final					Rank
Athlete	Horse	Event	Qualifier		GPS		GPF		Total score (GPS + GPF)	Rank
Athlete	Horse	Event	% Score	Rank	% Score	Rank	% Score	Rank	Total score (GPS + GPF)	Rank
Diani Lee Cheng	Stravinsky	Individual dressage	63.500	12 Q	61.737	14	Did not advance			16
Quzandria Nur	Handsome	Individual dressage	65.722	7 Q	69.316	3 Q	73.800	2	71.558	2nd place, silver medalist(s)
Putri Alia Soraya	Odurin	Individual dressage	62.722	15	Did not advance					21
Qabil Ambak	Wup	Individual dressage	66.111	5 Q	69.789	2 Q	72.600	3	71.195	3rd place, bronze medalist(s)
Diani Lee Cheng; Quzandria Nur; Putri Alia Soraya; Qabil Ambak	Stravinsky; Handsome; Odurin; Wup;	Team dressage	—N/a						65.111	3rd place, bronze medalist(s)

Jumping

Athlete	Horse	Event	Qualifier						Final						Rank
Athlete	Horse	Event	First		Second		Total		Round A		Round B		Total score (A + B)		Rank
Athlete	Horse	Event	Pen.	Rank	Pen.	Rank	Pen.	Rank	Pen.	Rank	Pen.	Rank	Pen.	Rank	Rank
Syed Mohsin Al-Mohdzar	Linus	Individual jumping	30	33 Q	20	33	50	32 Q	27	23	Did not advance				23
Syed Omar Al-Mohdzar	Manila VDL	Individual jumping	EL	0	Did not advance										39

== Fencing ==
Men

Athlete	Event	Round of Pools		Round of 32	Round of 16	Quarterfinals	Semifinals	Final	Rank
Athlete	Event	Opponent Score	Rank	Opponent Score	Opponent Score	Opponent Score	Opponent Score	Opponent Score	Rank
Joshua Koh I Jie (16)	Individual épée	Shogo Nishida (JPN); L 3–5	17 Q	Qaisar Al-Zamel (IOC); L 12–15	Did not advance				20
Joshua Koh I Jie (16)	Individual épée	Yin Lianchi (CHN); W 5–4	17 Q	Qaisar Al-Zamel (IOC); L 12–15	Did not advance				20
Joshua Koh I Jie (16)	Individual épée	Tsui Yiu Chung (HKG); L 4–5	17 Q	Qaisar Al-Zamel (IOC); L 12–15	Did not advance				20
Joshua Koh I Jie (16)	Individual épée	Abdullah Al-Hammadi (UAE); W 5–2	17 Q	Qaisar Al-Zamel (IOC); L 12–15	Did not advance				20
Joshua Koh I Jie (16)	Individual épée	Nasser Al-Omayri (KSA); L 4–5	17 Q	Qaisar Al-Zamel (IOC); L 12–15	Did not advance				20
Zairul Zaimi Mohd Arsad (10)	Individual foil	Yuki Ota (JPN); L 1–5	15 Q	Phatthanapong Srisawat (THA); L 14–15	Did not advance				18
Zairul Zaimi Mohd Arsad (10)	Individual foil	Cheung Siu Lun (HKG); L 0–5	15 Q	Phatthanapong Srisawat (THA); L 14–15	Did not advance				18
Zairul Zaimi Mohd Arsad (10)	Individual foil	Hamed Sayyad Ghanbari (IRI); W 5–2	15 Q	Phatthanapong Srisawat (THA); L 14–15	Did not advance				18
Zairul Zaimi Mohd Arsad (10)	Individual foil	Rajeshor Singh (IND); W 5–0	15 Q	Phatthanapong Srisawat (THA); L 14–15	Did not advance				18
Zairul Zaimi Mohd Arsad (10)	Individual foil	Ali Al-Mansoori (UAE); W 5–2	15 Q	Phatthanapong Srisawat (THA); L 14–15	Did not advance				18
Zairul Zaimi Mohd Arsad (10)	Individual foil	Bùi Văn Thái (VIE); L 1–5	15 Q	Phatthanapong Srisawat (THA); L 14–15	Did not advance				18
Yu Peng Kean (14)	Individual sabre	Zhong Man (CHN); L 1–5	10 Q	Bye	Satoshi Ogawa (JPN); L 8–15	Did not advance			11
Yu Peng Kean (14)	Individual sabre	Lam Hin Chung (HKG); L 1–5	10 Q	Bye	Satoshi Ogawa (JPN); L 8–15	Did not advance			11
Yu Peng Kean (14)	Individual sabre	Wiradech Kothny (THA); W 5–4	10 Q	Bye	Satoshi Ogawa (JPN); L 8–15	Did not advance			11
Yu Peng Kean (14)	Individual sabre	Ahmad Abdulkhedhr (IOC); W 5–0	10 Q	Bye	Satoshi Ogawa (JPN); L 8–15	Did not advance			11
Yu Peng Kean (14)	Individual sabre	Ghazi Al-Monasef (KSA); W 5–3	10 Q	Bye	Satoshi Ogawa (JPN); L 8–15	Did not advance			11

== Field hockey ==
=== Men's tournament ===
Squad list	Pool matches			Semifinal	Final	Rank
Squad list	Group A		Rank	Semifinal	Final	Rank
Amin Rahim; Azlan Misron; Azreen Rizal Nasir; Baljit Singh Charun; Faizal Saari; Hafifihafiz Hanafi; Izwan Firdaus Ahmad Tajuddin; Kumar Subramaniam; Madzli Ikmar; Marhan Jalil; Nabil Fiqri; Razie Rahim; Roslan Jamaluddin; Shahrun Nabil; Sukri Mutalib; Tengku Ahmad Tajuddin Tengku Abdul Jalil; Coach: Stephen Van Huizen	Singapore; W 3 – 0 Hanafi 7'; Misron 33'; R. Rahim 35'	Oman; W 12 – 2 M. Jalil 8'; T. Jalil 15'; A. Rahim 19' 60'; R. Rahim 22'; Hanafi 24'; Misron 25' 55' 69'; Saari 33' 61'; I. Tajuddin 45'; Al Shatri 40'; Jandal 63'	2 Q	India; W 4 – 3, AET; T. Jalil 32'; Misron 49'; A. Rahim 67' 75'; Sandeep 35'; Khandker 37'; Rajpal 54'	Gold medal match Pakistan; L 0 – 2 Abbas 26'; Butt 38'	2nd place, silver medalist(s)
Amin Rahim; Azlan Misron; Azreen Rizal Nasir; Baljit Singh Charun; Faizal Saari; Hafifihafiz Hanafi; Izwan Firdaus Ahmad Tajuddin; Kumar Subramaniam; Madzli Ikmar; Marhan Jalil; Nabil Fiqri; Razie Rahim; Roslan Jamaluddin; Shahrun Nabil; Sukri Mutalib; Tengku Ahmad Tajuddin Tengku Abdul Jalil; Coach: Stephen Van Huizen	South Korea; D 2 – 2 Misron 24'; Hanafi 48'; Hyun Hye-sung 9'; Seo Jong-ho 65'	China; W 4 – 2 A. Rahim 2'; Saari 18'; Hanafi 41'; Misron 66'; Liu Yixian 13'; Na Yubo 36'	2 Q	India; W 4 – 3, AET; T. Jalil 32'; Misron 49'; A. Rahim 67' 75'; Sandeep 35'; Khandker 37'; Rajpal 54'	Gold medal match Pakistan; L 0 – 2 Abbas 26'; Butt 38'	2nd place, silver medalist(s)

=== Women's tournament ===
Squad list	Pool matches		Rank	Final	Rank
Nadia Abdul Rahman; Nuraini Abdul Rashid; Nor Hidayah Ahmad Bokhari; Norhasikin Halim; Norbaini Hashim; Norfaraha Hashim; Sebah Kari; Catherine Lambor; Noor Haslize Md Ali; Juliani Mohamad Din; Rabiatul Adawiyah Mohamed; Siti Nor Amarina Ruhaini; Norazlin Sumantri; Fazilla Sylvester Silin; Farah Ayuni Yahya; Siti Noor Hafiza Zainordin	India; L 0 – 4 Thokchom 26'; Deepika 43'; Rampal 53'; S. Kaur 67'	China; L 0 – 6 Zhao Yudiao 16' 44'; Ren Ye 30'; Fu Baorong 35'; Xu Xiaoxu 55'; Ma Wei 70'	5	Fifth and sixth place classification Thailand; W 3 – 0 Ruhaini 13'; Rahman 34'; Silin 57'	5
Nadia Abdul Rahman; Nuraini Abdul Rashid; Nor Hidayah Ahmad Bokhari; Norhasikin Halim; Norbaini Hashim; Norfaraha Hashim; Sebah Kari; Catherine Lambor; Noor Haslize Md Ali; Juliani Mohamad Din; Rabiatul Adawiyah Mohamed; Siti Nor Amarina Ruhaini; Norazlin Sumantri; Fazilla Sylvester Silin; Farah Ayuni Yahya; Siti Noor Hafiza Zainordin	Japan; L 2 – 4 Md Ali 55'; Norfaraha 61'; Chiba 3' 63'; Murakami 12'; Nakagawa 68'	South Korea; L 0 – 4 Park Mi-hyun 27'; Cheon Seul-ki 39'; Kim Eun-sil 49'; Lee Seon-ok 67'	5	Fifth and sixth place classification Thailand; W 3 – 0 Ruhaini 13'; Rahman 34'; Silin 57'	5
Nadia Abdul Rahman; Nuraini Abdul Rashid; Nor Hidayah Ahmad Bokhari; Norhasikin Halim; Norbaini Hashim; Norfaraha Hashim; Sebah Kari; Catherine Lambor; Noor Haslize Md Ali; Juliani Mohamad Din; Rabiatul Adawiyah Mohamed; Siti Nor Amarina Ruhaini; Norazlin Sumantri; Fazilla Sylvester Silin; Farah Ayuni Yahya; Siti Noor Hafiza Zainordin	Thailand; W 5 – 0 Ruhaini 24'; Ahmad Bokhari 32' 70'; Hashim 33'; Sumantri 37'	Kazakhstan; W 5 – 0 Sumantri 17' 66'; Rahman 41'; Silin 56'	5	Fifth and sixth place classification Thailand; W 3 – 0 Ruhaini 13'; Rahman 34'; Silin 57'	5

== Football ==
=== Men's tournament ===
Squad list	Pool matches		1/8 final	Quarterfinal	Semifinal	Final	Rank
Squad list	Group A	Rank	1/8 final	Quarterfinal	Semifinal	Final	Rank
Mohd Zamir Selamat (GK); Mohd Asraruddin Putra Omar; Mohd Norhafiz Zamani Misbah (C); Mohd Faizal Muhammad; Mohd Safiq Rahim; Norshahrul Idlan Talaha; Gary Steven Robbat; Amar Rohidan; Ahmad Fakri Saarani; Mohd Khyril Muhymeen Zambri; K. Gurusamy; S. Kunanlan; Mahali Jasuli; Mohd Faizal Abu Bakar; Izzaq Faris Ramlan; Khairul Fahmi Che Mat (GK); S. Chanthuru; Mohd Muslim Ahmad; Mohd Fandi Othman; Mohd Fadhli Mohd Shas; Head Coach: K. Rajagopal	Kyrgyzstan; W 2 – 1 Talaha 27'; Chanturu 60'; Sydykov 37'	3 q	Iran; L 1 – 3 Talaha 86' (pen.); Ansarifard 53'; Hosseini 59'; Sharafi 67'	Did not advance			16
Mohd Zamir Selamat (GK); Mohd Asraruddin Putra Omar; Mohd Norhafiz Zamani Misbah (C); Mohd Faizal Muhammad; Mohd Safiq Rahim; Norshahrul Idlan Talaha; Gary Steven Robbat; Amar Rohidan; Ahmad Fakri Saarani; Mohd Khyril Muhymeen Zambri; K. Gurusamy; S. Kunanlan; Mahali Jasuli; Mohd Faizal Abu Bakar; Izzaq Faris Ramlan; Khairul Fahmi Che Mat (GK); S. Chanthuru; Mohd Muslim Ahmad; Mohd Fandi Othman; Mohd Fadhli Mohd Shas; Head Coach: K. Rajagopal	Japan; L 0 – 2 Nagai 26'; Yamaguchi 64'	3 q	Iran; L 1 – 3 Talaha 86' (pen.); Ansarifard 53'; Hosseini 59'; Sharafi 67'	Did not advance			16
Mohd Zamir Selamat (GK); Mohd Asraruddin Putra Omar; Mohd Norhafiz Zamani Misbah (C); Mohd Faizal Muhammad; Mohd Safiq Rahim; Norshahrul Idlan Talaha; Gary Steven Robbat; Amar Rohidan; Ahmad Fakri Saarani; Mohd Khyril Muhymeen Zambri; K. Gurusamy; S. Kunanlan; Mahali Jasuli; Mohd Faizal Abu Bakar; Izzaq Faris Ramlan; Khairul Fahmi Che Mat (GK); S. Chanthuru; Mohd Muslim Ahmad; Mohd Fandi Othman; Mohd Fadhli Mohd Shas; Head Coach: K. Rajagopal	China; L 0 – 3 Li Kai 61'; Zhao Honglue 65'; Zhang Linpeng 83' (pen.)	3 q	Iran; L 1 – 3 Talaha 86' (pen.); Ansarifard 53'; Hosseini 59'; Sharafi 67'	Did not advance			16

== Golf ==
Men

Athlete	Event	Round 1		Round 2		Round 3		Round 4		Total score	Par	Final rank
Athlete	Event	Score	Par	Score	Par	Score	Par	Score	Par	Total score	Par	Final rank
Chan Tuck Soon	Individual	76	+4	75	+3	73	+1	75	+3	299	+11	21
Kenneth Christian John de Silva	Individual	79	+7	84	+12	78	+6	75	+3	316	+28	46
Mohamad Iylia Jamil	Individual	86	+14	79	+7	78	+6	76	+4	319	+31	47
Arie Irawan	Individual	82	+10	74	+2	73	+1	64	-8	293	+5	12
Chan Tuck Soon; Kenneth Christian John de Silva; Mohamad Iylia Jamil; Arie Irawan	Team	237	+21	228	+12	224	+8	214	-2	903	+39	10

Women

Athlete	Event	Round 1		Round 2		Round 3		Round 4		Total score	Par	Final rank
Athlete	Event	Score	Par	Score	Par	Score	Par	Score	Par	Total score	Par	Final rank
Iman Ahmad Nordin	Individual	81	+9	82	+10	79	+7	75	+3	317	+29	21
Kelly Tan Guat Chen	Individual	77	+5	73	+1	73	+1	76	+4	299	+11	14
Vivienne Chin Ven Yi	Individual	81	+9	79	+7	83	+11	89	+17	332	+44	27
Iman Ahmad Nordin; Kelly Tan Guat Chen; Vivienne Chin Ven Yi	Team	158	+14	152	+8	152	+8	151	+7	613	+37	7

== Gymnastics ==
=== Artistic ===
Men

Athlete	Event	FX Rank	PH Rank	SR Rank	VT Rank	PB Rank	HB Rank	Total	Rank
Lum Wan Foong	Qualification	12.700; 50	12.350; 39	13.400; 32	14.800; 42	13.150; 39	13.650; 20	80.050	20 Q
Lum Wan Foong	Individual all-around	Did not start						0.000	24

Women

Athlete	Event	VT Rank	UB Rank	BB Rank	FX Rank	Total	Rank
Tracie Ang	Qualification	12.550; 29	11.750; 21	13.700; 10 Q	12.000; 17	50.000	15 Q
Tracie Ang	Individual all-around	13.800; 7	12.250; 9	12.400; 10	12.700; 8	51.150	10
Tracie Ang	Balance beam	—N/a		11.950; 7	—N/a	11.950	7

=== Rhythmic ===
Women

Athlete	Event	Qualification						Final					
Athlete	Event	Rope Rank	Hoop Rank	Ball Rank	Clubs Rank	Total	Rank	Rope Rank	Hoop Rank	Ball Rank	Clubs Rank	Total	Rank
Elaine Koon	Individual all-around	23.900; 18	23.100; 17	24.900; 16	24.250; 14	73.050	15 Q	24.050; 12	24.050; 14	25.300; 10	24.500; 12	97.900	11
Nurul Hidayah Abdul Wahid	Individual all-around	24.050; 16	22.500; 19	24.450; 18	23.150; 18	71.650	17 Q	25.050; 11	24.400; 11	24.450; 13	23.950; 13	97.850	12

== Kabaddi ==
=== Men's tournament ===
Squad list	Preliminary round		Semifinal	Final	Rank
Squad list	Group B	Rank	Semifinal	Final	Rank
Jegankumar Balaraman; Gabrial Johnson; Pokuneswaran Manium; Rubesh Manohran; Jeeya Muthusamy; Jaya Prakash Panneer Selvam; Jaiprakash Narain Rajasegaran; Jeevan Raman; Thigayu Thangavelu	Pakistan; L 27 – 51	4	Did not advance		7
Jegankumar Balaraman; Gabrial Johnson; Pokuneswaran Manium; Rubesh Manohran; Jeeya Muthusamy; Jaya Prakash Panneer Selvam; Jaiprakash Narain Rajasegaran; Jeevan Raman; Thigayu Thangavelu	Bangladesh; L 38 – 48	4	Did not advance		7
Jegankumar Balaraman; Gabrial Johnson; Pokuneswaran Manium; Rubesh Manohran; Jeeya Muthusamy; Jaya Prakash Panneer Selvam; Jaiprakash Narain Rajasegaran; Jeevan Raman; Thigayu Thangavelu	Japan; L 17 – 48	4	Did not advance		7

=== Women's tournament ===
Squad list	Preliminary round		Semifinal	Final	Rank
Squad list	Group A	Rank	Semifinal	Final	Rank
Thibahtarusini Arumugam; Balajothi Gunasekaran; Ruth Brigttee Kremlin; Saraswathy Krishnan; Norhaslinda Misrawi; Turgaini Rajagopal; Ellammal Ravichandran; Seetha Devy Ravindran; Sobana Sathasivam; Punitta Subramaniam	Thailand; L 19 – 45	4	Did not advance		7
Thibahtarusini Arumugam; Balajothi Gunasekaran; Ruth Brigttee Kremlin; Saraswathy Krishnan; Norhaslinda Misrawi; Turgaini Rajagopal; Ellammal Ravichandran; Seetha Devy Ravindran; Sobana Sathasivam; Punitta Subramaniam	Chinese Taipei; L 33 – 48	4	Did not advance		7
Thibahtarusini Arumugam; Balajothi Gunasekaran; Ruth Brigttee Kremlin; Saraswathy Krishnan; Norhaslinda Misrawi; Turgaini Rajagopal; Ellammal Ravichandran; Seetha Devy Ravindran; Sobana Sathasivam; Punitta Subramaniam	Iran; L 10 – 73	4	Did not advance		7

== Karate ==
Men

Athlete	Event	1/16 final	1/8 final	Quarterfinal	Semifinal	Final	Rank
Athlete	Event	Opposition Score	Opposition Score	Opposition Score	Opposition Score	Opposition Score	Rank
Ku Jin Keat	Individual kata	—N/a	Chris Cheng (HKG); W 5 – 0	Dmitrii Kazanov (KGZ); W 5 – 0	Faisal Zainuddin (INA); W 4 – 1	Gold medal match Itaru Oki (JPN); W 3 – 2	1st place, gold medalist(s)
Puvaneswaran Ramasamy	Kumite 55 kg	—N/a	Nguyen Hoang Hiep (VIE); W 1 – 0	Hsieh Cheng-kang (TPE); W 0 – 0	Mohammad Ghasemi (IRI); W 1 – 0	Gold medal match Emad Al-Malki (KSA); W 0 – 0	1st place, gold medalist(s)
Lim Yoke Wai	Kumite 67 kg	Shinji Nagaki (JPN); L 0 - 1	Did not advance				
Mohd Hatta Mahamut	Kumite 84 kg	Bye	Md Jamil Haji Abd Hamid (BRU); W 9 – 1	Jasem Vishgahi (IRI); L 1 – 2	Repechage 2 Mutassembellah Khair (JOR); L 0 – 6	Did not advance	

Women

Athlete	Event	1/16 final	1/8 final	Quarterfinal	Semifinal	Final	Rank
Athlete	Event	Opposition Score	Opposition Score	Opposition Score	Opposition Score	Opposition Score	Rank
Lim Lee Lee	Individual kata	—N/a	Yanisa Torrattanawathana (THA); W 5 – 0	Rika Usami (JPN); L 0 – 5	Repechage 1 Roji Nagarkoti (NEP); W 5 – 0	Bronze medal match Dewi Yulianti (INA); W 5 – 0	3rd place, bronze medalist(s)
Vathana Gopalasamy	Kumite 55 kg	—N/a	Marna Pabillore (PHI); L 1 – 1	Did not advance			
Yamini Gopalasamy	Kumite 61 kg	—N/a	Bye	Chan Ka Man (HKG); W 2 – 0	Chang Ting (TPE); W 5 – 4	Gold medal match Yu Miyamoto (JPN); L 0 – 7	2nd place, silver medalist(s)
Jamaliah Jamaluddin	Kumite +68 kg	—N/a		Paula Cristina Pereira (MAC); W 1 – 0	Gaukhar Chaikuzova (KAZ); W 1 – 0	Gold medal match Manar Shath (JOR); L 2 – 5	2nd place, silver medalist(s)

== Rugby sevens ==
=== Men's tournament ===
Squad list	Preliminary round		Quarterfinal	Semifinal	Final	Rank
Squad list	Pool A	Rank	Quarterfinal	Semifinal	Final	Rank
Aswad Ahmad; Zulkiflee Azmi; Faesal Hafeez; Dinesvaran Krishnan; Hafifi Md Noor; Hafis Md Noor; K. Azhar Md Noor; M. Taufiq Mohd Noor; Nazreen Nasrudin; Nik Safuan Nik Man; Mohd Syahir Rosli	Hong Kong; L 10 – 38 (5-14, 5-24)	3 Q	South Korea; L 7 – 47 (7-26, 0-21)	5th to 8th placement match India; W 38 – 5 (21-0, 17-5)	5th and 6th placement match Sri Lanka; W 27 – 7 (5-7, 22-0)	5
Aswad Ahmad; Zulkiflee Azmi; Faesal Hafeez; Dinesvaran Krishnan; Hafifi Md Noor; Hafis Md Noor; K. Azhar Md Noor; M. Taufiq Mohd Noor; Nazreen Nasrudin; Nik Safuan Nik Man; Mohd Syahir Rosli	Japan; L 0 – 24 (0-12, 0-12)	3 Q	South Korea; L 7 – 47 (7-26, 0-21)	5th to 8th placement match India; W 38 – 5 (21-0, 17-5)	5th and 6th placement match Sri Lanka; W 27 – 7 (5-7, 22-0)	5
Aswad Ahmad; Zulkiflee Azmi; Faesal Hafeez; Dinesvaran Krishnan; Hafifi Md Noor; Hafis Md Noor; K. Azhar Md Noor; M. Taufiq Mohd Noor; Nazreen Nasrudin; Nik Safuan Nik Man; Mohd Syahir Rosli	Mongolia; W 29 – 0 (19-0, 10-0)	3 Q	South Korea; L 7 – 47 (7-26, 0-21)	5th to 8th placement match India; W 38 – 5 (21-0, 17-5)	5th and 6th placement match Sri Lanka; W 27 – 7 (5-7, 22-0)	5
Aswad Ahmad; Zulkiflee Azmi; Faesal Hafeez; Dinesvaran Krishnan; Hafifi Md Noor; Hafis Md Noor; K. Azhar Md Noor; M. Taufiq Mohd Noor; Nazreen Nasrudin; Nik Safuan Nik Man; Mohd Syahir Rosli	Thailand; W 29 – 14 (12-14, 17-0)	3 Q	South Korea; L 7 – 47 (7-26, 0-21)	5th to 8th placement match India; W 38 – 5 (21-0, 17-5)	5th and 6th placement match Sri Lanka; W 27 – 7 (5-7, 22-0)	5

== Sailing ==
Men

Athlete	Event	Race												Net points	Rank
Athlete	Event	1	2	3	4	5	6	7	8	9	10	11	12	Net points	Rank
Hadri Zainal Abidin	RS:X	~~9~~	8	9	9	9	8	9	9	8	9	9	8	95	9
Ahmad Latif Khan Ali Sabri Khan	Dinghy Optimist	5	2	1	2	3	3	3	2	4	2	4	~~7~~	95	2nd place, silver medalist(s)
Khairulnizam Afendy	Laser	~~5~~	3	5	4	1	4	4	5	2	4	4	3	39	4
Ku Anas Ku Zamil; Mohamad Hafizzudin Mazelan	Double Handed Dinghy 420	4	3	~~5~~	3	2	3	3	5	4	2	5	5	39	3rd place, bronze medalist(s)
Razman Mat Ali; Ahmad Hakhimi Ahmad Shukri	Double Handed Dinghy 470	6	5	~~7~~	7	5	6	4	6	4	5	7	7	62	6

Women

Athlete	Event	Race												Net points	Rank
Athlete	Event	1	2	3	4	5	6	7	8	9	10	11	12	Net points	Rank
Koe Sin Yee	Mistral	5	5	~~DNF~~	DNF	5	5	5	3	5	4	5	5	53	5
Geh Cheow Lin	RS:X	4	~~DNF~~	DNF	DNF	5	5	5	5	5	4	5	4	54	5
Nurul Izzatul Akmar Muhamad Ruzaimi	Dinghy Optimist	3	4	4	~~8~~	3	4	4	3	5	1	7	3	41	4
Khairunnisa Mohd Afendy; Norashikin Mohamad Sayed	Double Handed Dinghy 420	3	2	2	~~4~~	4	4	1	2	2	2	2	3	27	2nd place, silver medalist(s)

Open

Athlete	Event	Race												Net points	Rank
Athlete	Event	1	2	3	4	5	6	7	8	9	10	11	12	Net points	Rank
Mohd Romzi Muhamad	Laser Radial	3	4	4	6	6	5	3	6	~~9~~	8	4	3	53	6

Athlete	Event	Round Robin		Semifinals	Final	Rank
Athlete	Event	Opponent Score	Rank	Opponent Score	Opponent Score	Rank
Mohd Karimi Bakar; Ahmad Fakhrizan Deraman; Mohamad Rafizol Md Rejab; Mohd Adib Mohd Ariff; Mohd Masyuri Rahmat	Match racing	Bahrain (BRN); W 1–1; China (CHN); L 0–1; India (IND); L 0–2; Japan (JPN); L 0–2; South Korea (KOR); L 0–2; Pakistan (PAK); W 1–1; Singapore (SIN); L 0–2	8	Did not advance		

== Sepaktakraw ==
Men

Squad list	Event	Round Robin			Rank
Mohd Normanizam Ahmad; Noor Azman Abdul Hamid; Muhd Futra Abdul Ghani; Norshahruddin Mad Ghani; Farhan Adam	Regu	Myanmar; W 2 - 0; 21-18, 21-18	China; W 2 - 0; 21-13, 21-10	Thailand; L 0 - 2; 12-21, 19-21	2nd place, silver medalist(s)

Squad list	Event	Preliminary		Semifinal	Final	Rank
Squad list	Event	Group B	Rank	Semifinal	Final	Rank
Mohd Normanizam Ahmad; Ariff Ramli; Ahmad Sufi Mohammed Hashim; Noor Azman Abdul Hamid; Muhd Futra Abdul Ghani; Mohammad Zulkarnain Mohamed Arif; Mohd Helmi Ismail; Mohd Hafizie Manap; Mohd Azman Nasruddin; Norshahruddin Mad Ghani; Farhan Adam; Muhammad Syazwan Husin	Team	China; W 2 - 1; 2-0, 1-2, 2-0	1 Q	South Korea; W 2 - 0; 2-1, 2-1	Gold medal match Thailand; L 0 - 2; 0-2, 0-2	2nd place, silver medalist(s)
Mohd Normanizam Ahmad; Ariff Ramli; Ahmad Sufi Mohammed Hashim; Noor Azman Abdul Hamid; Muhd Futra Abdul Ghani; Mohammad Zulkarnain Mohamed Arif; Mohd Helmi Ismail; Mohd Hafizie Manap; Mohd Azman Nasruddin; Norshahruddin Mad Ghani; Farhan Adam; Muhammad Syazwan Husin	Team	Japan; W 3 - 0; 2-0, 2-0, 2-0	1 Q	South Korea; W 2 - 0; 2-1, 2-1	Gold medal match Thailand; L 0 - 2; 0-2, 0-2	2nd place, silver medalist(s)
Mohd Normanizam Ahmad; Ariff Ramli; Ahmad Sufi Mohammed Hashim; Noor Azman Abdul Hamid; Muhd Futra Abdul Ghani; Mohammad Zulkarnain Mohamed Arif; Mohd Helmi Ismail; Mohd Hafizie Manap; Mohd Azman Nasruddin; Norshahruddin Mad Ghani; Farhan Adam; Muhammad Syazwan Husin	Team	India; W 3 - 0; 2-0, 2-0, 2-0	1 Q	South Korea; W 2 - 0; 2-1, 2-1	Gold medal match Thailand; L 0 - 2; 0-2, 0-2	2nd place, silver medalist(s)

== Shooting ==
Men

Athlete	Event	Qualification		Final	
Athlete	Event	Score	Rank	Score	Rank
Hafiz Adzha	25 m center fire pistol	—N/a		Did not start	
Hasli Izwan Amir Hassan	25 m center fire pistol	—N/a		577 (18x)	15
Hafiz Adzha	25 m rapid fire pistol	579 (17x); QS-Off 45	7	Did not advance	
Hasli Izwan Amir Hassan	25 m rapid fire pistol	571 (14x)	12	Did not advance	
Hafiz Adzha	25 m standard pistol	—N/a		540 (9x)	34
Hasli Izwan Amir Hassan	25 m standard pistol	—N/a		547 (8x)	27
Hisyam Adzha	10 m air rifle	Did not start		Did not advance	
Mohd Nurrahimin Abdul Halim	10 m air rifle	579 (31x)	36	Did not advance	
Muhammad Shahril Sahak	10 m air rifle	580 (28x)	35	Did not advance	
Hisyam Adzha; Mohd Nurrahimin Abdul Halim; Muhammad Shahril Sahak	10 m air rifle team	—N/a		Did not start	
Hisyam Adzha	50 m rifle prone	587 (25x)	26	Did not advance	
Mohd Nurrahimin Abdul Halim	50 m rifle prone	579 (27x)	45	Did not advance	
Muhammad Shahril Sahak	50 m rifle prone	584 (27x)	33	Did not advance	
Hisyam Adzha; Mohd Nurrahimin Abdul Halim; Muhammad Shahril Sahak	50 m rifle prone team	—N/a		1750 (79x)	12
Hisyam Adzha	50 m rifle 3 positions	1129 (31x)	30	Did not advance	
Mohd Nurrahimin Abdul Halim	50 m rifle 3 positions	1136 (38x)	22	Did not advance	
Muhammad Shahril Sahak	50 m rifle 3 positions	1113 (32x)	37	Did not advance	
Hisyam Adzha; Mohd Nurrahimin Abdul Halim; Muhammad Shahril Sahak	50 m rifle 3 positions team	—N/a		3378 (101x)	9
Bernard Yeoh Cheng Han	Trap	110	21	Did not advance	
Chen Seong Fook	Trap	114	9	Did not advance	
Ong Chee Keng	Trap	98	35	Did not advance	
Bernard Yeoh Cheng Han; Chen Seong Fook; Ong Chee Keng	Trap team	—N/a		322	10
Benjamin Khor Cheng Jie	Double trap	121	26	Did not advance	
Khor Seng Chye	Double trap	130	19	Did not advance	
Tan Tian Xiang	Double trap	120	27	Did not advance	
Benjamin Khor Cheng Jie; Khor Seng Chye; Tan Tian Xiang	Double trap team	—N/a		371	9

Women

Athlete	Event	Qualification		Final	
Athlete	Event	Score	Rank	Score	Rank
Bibiana Ng Pei Chin	10 m air pistol	373 (5x)	29	Did not advance	
Joseline Cheah Lee Yean	10 m air pistol	375 (7x)	25	Did not advance	
Bibiana Ng Pei Chin	25 m pistol	576 (16x)	11	Did not advance	
Joseline Cheah Lee Yean	25 m pistol	561 (15x)	32	Did not advance	
Nur Ayuni Farhana Abdul Halim	10 m air rifle	379 (18x)	52	Did not advance	
Nur Suryani Taibi	10 m air rifle	397 (32x)	6 Q	501.8	3rd place, bronze medalist(s)
Shahera Rahim Raja	10 m air rifle	390 (21x)	36	Did not advance	
Nur Ayuni Farhana Abdul Halim; Nur Suryani Taibi; Shahera Rahim Raja	10 m air rifle team	—N/a		1166 (71x)	13
Mariani Mohamad Rafali	50 m rifle prone	—N/a		565 (17x)	48
Nur Suryani Taibi	50 m rifle prone	—N/a		585 (29x)	17
Shahera Rahim Raja	50 m rifle prone	—N/a		589 (30x)	8
Mariani Mohamad Rafali; Nur Suryani Taibi; Shahera Rahim Raja	50 m rifle prone team	—N/a		1739 (76x)	10
Nur Ayuni Farhana Abdul Halim	50 m rifle 3 positions	563 (15x)	29	Did not advance	
Nur Suryani Taibi	50 m rifle 3 positions	573 (26x)	9	Did not advance	
Shahera Rahim Raja	50 m rifle 3 positions	554 (15x)	36	Did not advance	
Nur Ayuni Farhana Abdul Halim; Nur Suryani Taibi; Shahera Rahim Raja	50 m rifle 3 positions team	—N/a		1690 (56x)	10

== Squash ==
Individual

Athlete	Event	Round of 32	Round of 16	Quarterfinal	Semifinal	Final	Rank
Athlete	Event	Opposition Score	Opposition Score	Opposition Score	Opposition Score	Opposition Score	Rank
Mohd Azlan Iskandar (1)	Men's singles	Bye	Lee Nyeon-ho (KOR); W 3 – 0; 11-1, 11-9, 11-7	Lee Ho Yin (HKG); W 3 – 1; 3-11, 11-5, 11-4, 11-6	Saurav Ghosal (IND); W 3 – 1; 11-5, 6-11, 11-5, 12-10	Gold medal match Aamir Atlas Khan (PAK); W 3 – 0; 11-6, 11-7, 11-8	1st place, gold medalist(s)
Ong Beng Hee (2)	Men's singles	Bye	Yuta Fukui (JPN); W 3 – 0; 11-2, 11-7, 11-5	Abdullah Al-Muzayen (IOC); W 3 – 2; 4-11, 11-7, 13-11, 9-11, 11-3	Aamir Atlas Khan (PAK); L 1 – 3; 5-11, 8-11, 11-9, 13-15	Did not advance	3rd place, bronze medalist(s)
Low Wee Wern (3)	Women's singles	—N/a	Chinatsu Matsui (JPN); W 3 – 0; 12-10, 11-4, 11-8	Joshna Chinappa (IND); W 3 – 2; 7-11, 9-11, 11-8, 11-9, 11-3	Nicol Ann David (MAS); L 0 – 3; 9-11, 3-11, 4-11	Did not advance	3rd place, bronze medalist(s)
Nicol David (1)	Women's singles	—N/a	Park Eun-ok (KOR); W 3 – 0; 11-3, 11-7, 11-6	Dipika Pallikal (IND); W 3 – 1; 11-8, 7-11, 11-6, 11-4	Low Wee Wern (MAS); W 3 – 0; 11-9, 11-3, 11-4	Gold medal match Annie Au (HKG); W 3 – 1; 11-8, 8-11, 11-6, 11-7	1st place, gold medalist(s)

=== Men's team ===
Pool B

Team	Pld	W	L	MF	MA
Malaysia	5	5	0	14	1
India	5	4	1	13	2
Japan	5	3	2	8	7
South Korea	5	2	3	7	8
Qatar	5	1	4	2	13
Saudi Arabia	5	0	5	1	14

21 November	Malaysia	3–0	Saudi Arabia

Mohd Nafiizwan Adnan	3–0	Naif Abu-Reqah	11–1, 11–7, 11–4
Ong Beng Hee	3–0	Mohammed Al-Saif	11–7, 14–12, 11–7
Ivan Yuen	3–0	Taher Al-Botayan	11–2, 11–5, 11–5

22 November	Malaysia	3–0	Qatar

Mohd Azlan Iskandar	3–0	Ahmed Al-Tamimi	11–2, 11–5, 11–5
Mohd Nafiizwan Adnan	3–0	Abdulla Al-Tamimi	11–9, 11–9, 11–4
Ivan Yuen	3–0	Omer Abdulla Ahmed	11–4, 11–1, 11–1

22 November	Malaysia	3–0	South Korea

Ong Beng Hee	3–0	Lee Nyeon-ho	11–8, 11–5, 11–8
Mohd Nafiizwan Adnan	3–1	Lee Se-hyun	5–11, 11–8, 11–6, 11–7
Ivan Yuen	3–0	Lee Seung-taek	11–3, 13–11, 11–6

23 November	Malaysia	3–0	Japan

Mohd Nafiizwan Adnan	3–0	Shinnosuke Tsuke	11–6, 11–7, 11–8
Ong Beng Hee	3–0	Yuta Fukui	11–6, 11–4, 11–8
Ivan Yuen	3–0	Takanori Shimizu	11–6, 11–6, 12–10

23 November	Malaysia	2–1	India

Mohd Nafiizwan Adnan	3–2	Siddharth Suchde	8–11, 8–11, 11–8, 11–4, 11–9
Mohd Azlan Iskandar	1–3	Saurav Ghosal	2–11, 9–11, 11–7, 5–11
Ivan Yuen	3–2	Harinder Pal Sandhu	11–9, 6–11, 11–6, 4–11, 12–10

Semifinal

24 November	Malaysia	2–0	Hong Kong

Mohd Nafiizwan Adnan	3–2	Dick Lau	9–11, 11–6, 6–11, 11–2, 11–6
Mohd Azlan Iskandar	3–0	Max Lee	11–4, 11–5, 11–4

Gold medal match

25 November	Pakistan	2–0	Malaysia

Farhan Mehboob	3–0	Ong Beng Hee	11–4, 11–4, 11–7
Aamir Atlas Khan	3–0	Mohd Azlan Iskandar	14–12, 15–13, 11–4

Ranked 2nd in final standings

=== Women's team ===
Pool A

Team	Pld	W	L	MF	MA
Malaysia	2	2	0	6	0
South Korea	2	1	1	2	4
Japan	2	0	2	1	5

22 November	Malaysia	3–0	Japan

Nicol David	3–0	Misaki Kobayashi	11–4, 11–7, 11–4
Low Wee Wern	3–1	Chinatsu Matsui	11–6, 11–4, 8–11, 11–4
Delia Arnold	3–0	Miwa Maekawa	11–5, 11–3, 11–4

23 November	Malaysia	3–0	South Korea

Delia Arnold	3–0	Park Eun-ok	11–5, 13–11, 11–1
Low Wee Wern	3–1	Song Sun-mi	9–11, 11–7, 11–4, 13–11
Sharon Wee	3–0	Kim Ga-hye	11–3, 11–6, 11–5

Semifinal

24 November	Malaysia	2–0	India

Low Wee Wern	3–0	Anaka Alankamony	11–2, 11–4, 11–6
Nicol David	3–0	Joshna Chinappa	11–4, 11–2, 11–3

Gold medal match

25 November	Malaysia	2–0	Hong Kong

Low Wee Wern	3–1	Rebecca Chiu	11–4, 7–11, 11–6, 11–9
Nicol David	3–0	Annie Au	11–8, 11–7, 11–6

Ranked 1st in final standings

== Table tennis ==
Singles

Athlete	Event	Round of 64	Round of 32	Round of 16	Quarterfinal	Semifinal	Final	Rank
Athlete	Event	Opposition Score	Opposition Score	Opposition Score	Opposition Score	Opposition Score	Opposition Score	Rank
Muhd Shakirin Ibrahim	Men's singles	Hatem Wadi (PLE); W 4 – 0; 11-4, 11-6, 11-8, 11-3	Amalraj Anthony Arputharaj (IND); L 2 – 4; 4-11, 11-7, 8-11, 11-13, 11-8, 8-11	Did not advance				
Beh Lee Wei (16)	Women's singles	Bye	Cheong Cheng I (MAC); W 4 – 0; 11-1, 11-3, 11-5, 11-5	Jiang Huajun (HKG); L 0 – 4; 7-11, 3-11, 6-11, 8-11	Did not advance			
Ng Sock Khim	Women's singles	Bye	Kim Jong (PRK); L 0 – 4; 3-11, 4-11, 3-11, 8-11	Did not advance				

Doubles

Athlete	Event	Round of 64	Round of 32	Round of 16	Quarterfinal	Semifinal	Final	Rank
Athlete	Event	Opposition Score	Opposition Score	Opposition Score	Opposition Score	Opposition Score	Opposition Score	Rank
Beh Lee Wei; Ng Sock Khim	Women's doubles	—N/a	Kim Hye-song (PRK); Kim Jong (PRK); L 2 – 3; 11-8, 2-11, 11-9, 6-11, 7-11	Did not advance				
Muhd Shakirin Ibrahim; Beh Lee Wei	Mixed doubles	—N/a	Chan S.K. (LAO); Sengdavy Phiathep (LAO); W 3 – 0; 11-2, 11-4, 11-5	Cheung Yuk (HKG); Jiang Huajun (HKG); L 0 – 3; 5-11, 6-11, 7-11	Did not advance			

Team

Athlete	Event	Preliminary		Quarterfinal	Semifinal	Final	Rank
Athlete	Event	Group D	Rank	Quarterfinal	Semifinal	Final	Rank
Beh Lee Wei; Ng Sock Khim; Chiu Soo Jiin	Women's team	South Korea; L 0 – 3; 0-3, 0-3, 1-3	3	Did not advance			
Beh Lee Wei; Ng Sock Khim; Chiu Soo Jiin	Women's team	Qatar; L 0 – 3; 0-3, 0-3, 0-3	3	Did not advance			
Beh Lee Wei; Ng Sock Khim; Chiu Soo Jiin	Women's team	Hong Kong; L 0 – 3; 0-3, 0-3, 0-3	3	Did not advance			

== Taekwondo ==
Men

Athlete	Event	1/16 final	1/8 final	Quarterfinal	Semifinal	Final	Rank
Athlete	Event	Opposition Score	Opposition Score	Opposition Score	Opposition Score	Opposition Score	Rank
Rusfredy Tokan Petrus	Flyweight (58 kg)	Hazza Sultan Al-Kalbani (UAE); L 6 – 9	Did not advance				
Afifuddin Omar Sidek	Featherweight (68 kg)	Chandan Lakra (IND); L 2 – 6	Did not advance				

Women

Athlete	Event	1/16 final	1/8 final	Quarterfinal	Semifinal	Final	Rank
Athlete	Event	Opposition Score	Opposition Score	Opposition Score	Opposition Score	Opposition Score	Rank
Nurul Asfahlina Johari	Finweight (46 kg)	—N/a	Aizhan Alizhanova (KAZ); W 2 – 1	Fransisca Valentina (INA); L 1 – 4	Did not advance		
Elaine Teo	Flyweight (49 kg)	—N/a	Jyra Marie Lizardo (PHI); W 6 – 3	Chanapa Sonkham (THA); L 3 – 6	Did not advance		
Nurul Nadia Mahamat	Bantamweight (53 kg)	Bye	Kwon Eun-kyung (KOR); L 8 – 2	Did not advance			

== Triathlon ==
Athlete	Event	Swim (1.5 km) Rank	Trans 1 Rank	Bike (40 km) Rank	Trans 2 Rank	Run (10 km) Rank	Total time	Rank
Muhd Zuhar Ismail	Men's individual	28:30; 21	1:30; 21	1:07:57; 18	0:49; 15	38:17; 15	2:17:05.38	17
Wei Kou Hau	Men's individual	25:56; 20	1:23; 19	1:10:37; 21	0:49; 15	41:17; 18	2:20:05.50	18

== Volleyball ==
=== Beach volleyball ===
Men

Athlete	Preliminary		Round of 16	Quarterfinals	Semifinals	Final	Rank
Athlete	Pool E	Rank	Round of 16	Quarterfinals	Semifinals	Final	Rank
Rafi Asruki Nordin; Khoo Chong Long	Sothearith Nget (CAM); Rom Mon (CAM); W 2 - 0; 21-16, 21-18	2 Q	Khalifa Al Jabri (OMA); Abdullah Al Rajhi (OMA); L 0 - 2; 18-21, 17-21	Did not advance			9
Rafi Asruki Nordin; Khoo Chong Long	Kasi Munuduri (IND); Kiran Meda (IND); W 2 - 1; 21-13, 20-22, 15-11	2 Q	Khalifa Al Jabri (OMA); Abdullah Al Rajhi (OMA); L 0 - 2; 18-21, 17-21	Did not advance			9
Rafi Asruki Nordin; Khoo Chong Long	Dmitry Yakovlev (KAZ); Alexey Kuleshov (KAZ); L 1 - 2; 21-19, 21-23, 9-15	2 Q	Khalifa Al Jabri (OMA); Abdullah Al Rajhi (OMA); L 0 - 2; 18-21, 17-21	Did not advance			9

Women

Athlete	Preliminary		Round of 16	Quarterfinals	Semifinals	Final	Rank
Athlete	Pool B	Rank	Round of 16	Quarterfinals	Semifinals	Final	Rank
Luk Teck Hua; Beh Shun Thing	Huang Ying (CHN); Yue Yuan (CHN); W 2 - 1; 15-21, 21-17, 15-12	3 Q	Tatyana Mashkova (KAZ); Irina Tsimbalova (KAZ); W 2 - 0; 21-19, 21-15	Satoko Urata (JPN); Takemi Nishibori (JPN); W 2 - 0; 21-15, 29-27	Huang Ying (CHN); Yue Yuan (CHN); L 0 - 2; 7-21, 13-21	Bronze medal match Usa Tenpaksee (THA); Jaruni Sannok (THA); L 0 - 2; 18-21, 14-21	4
Luk Teck Hua; Beh Shun Thing	Shinako Tanaka (JPN); Sayaka Mizoe (JPN); L 0 - 2; 17-21, 14-21	3 Q	Tatyana Mashkova (KAZ); Irina Tsimbalova (KAZ); W 2 - 0; 21-19, 21-15	Satoko Urata (JPN); Takemi Nishibori (JPN); W 2 - 0; 21-15, 29-27	Huang Ying (CHN); Yue Yuan (CHN); L 0 - 2; 7-21, 13-21	Bronze medal match Usa Tenpaksee (THA); Jaruni Sannok (THA); L 0 - 2; 18-21, 14-21	4
Luk Teck Hua; Beh Shun Thing	Alincia Fxl (TLS); Mariana Dos Santos (TLS); W 2 - 0; 21-5, 21-7	3 Q	Tatyana Mashkova (KAZ); Irina Tsimbalova (KAZ); W 2 - 0; 21-19, 21-15	Satoko Urata (JPN); Takemi Nishibori (JPN); W 2 - 0; 21-15, 29-27	Huang Ying (CHN); Yue Yuan (CHN); L 0 - 2; 7-21, 13-21	Bronze medal match Usa Tenpaksee (THA); Jaruni Sannok (THA); L 0 - 2; 18-21, 14-21	4

== Wushu ==
Taolu

Athlete	Event	Changquan Score Rank	Rank
Ang Eng Chong	Men's changquan	9.64; 7	7

Athlete	Event	Nandao Score Rank	Nanquan Score Rank	Total	Rank
Diana Bong Siong Lin	Women's nanquan	8.80; 6	9.66; 2	18.46	5
Tai Cheau Xuen	Women's nanquan	9.24; 4	9.62; 3	18.86	3rd place, bronze medalist(s)

Athlete	Event	Taijijian Score Rank	Taijiquan Score Rank	Total	Rank
Jack Loh Chang	Men's taijiquan	9.46; 11	9.47; 9	18.93	9
Lee Yang	Men's taijiquan	9.58; 7	9.30; 12	18.88	11
Chai Fong Ying	Women's taijiquan	9.67; 1	9.69; 1	19.36	1st place, gold medalist(s)
Ng Shin Yii	Women's taijiquan	9.56; 7	9.66; 4	19.22	5

Sanshou

Athlete	Event	Round of 16	Quarterfinal	Semifinal	Final	Rank
Athlete	Event	Opposition Score	Opposition Score	Opposition Score	Opposition Score	Rank
Lee Sew Ket	Men's sanshou 75 kg	Bye	Hamid Reza Gholipour (IRI); L 0 - 2	Did not advance		5
