= Cycling at the 2010 Asian Games – Men's keirin =

Men's keirin at the 2010 Asian Games
- Venue: Guangzhou Velodrome
- Date: 16–17 November 2010
- Competitors: 18 from 11 nations

Medalists
gold medal	Azizulhasni Awang	Malaysia
silver medal	Josiah Ng	Malaysia
bronze medal	Zhang Miao	China

The men's keirin competition at the 2010 Asian Games was held from 16 to 17 November at the Guangzhou Velodrome.

== Schedule ==
All times are China Standard Time (UTC+08:00)

Date	Time	Event
Tuesday, 16 November 2010	12:14	Round 1
Tuesday, 16 November 2010	14:00	Repechages 1
Tuesday, 16 November 2010	15:30	Round 2
Wednesday, 17 November 2010	12:26	Finals

== Results ==
Legend

- DNF — Did not finish
- DNS — Did not start
- DSQ — Disqualified
- REL — Relegated

=== Round 1 ===
==== Heat 1 ====
Rank	Athlete	Notes
1	Kazunari Watanabe (JPN)	
2	Mohammad Parash (IRI)	
3	Yuen Chi Ho (HKG)	
4	Badr Ali Shambih (UAE)	
5	Jun Won-gu (KOR)	
6	Hylem Prince (IND)	

==== Heat 2 ====
Rank	Athlete	Notes
1	Zhang Miao (CHN)	
2	Azizulhasni Awang (MAS)	
3	Kota Asai (JPN)	
4	Mahmoud Parash (IRI)	
5	Wu Po-hung (TPE)	
6	Raja Audi (LIB)	

==== Heat 3 ====
Rank	Athlete	Notes
1	Zhang Lei (CHN)	
2	Josiah Ng (MAS)	
3	Choi Lae-seon (KOR)	
4	Liao Kuo-lung (TPE)	
5	Okram Bikram Singh (IND)	
6	Jaber Majrashi (KSA)	

=== Repechages 1 ===
==== Heat 1 ====
Rank	Athlete	Notes
1	Yuen Chi Ho (HKG)	
2	Hylem Prince (IND)	
—	Liao Kuo-lung (TPE)	REL
—	Wu Po-hung (TPE)	DSQ

==== Heat 2 ====
Rank	Athlete	Notes
1	Mahmoud Parash (IRI)	
2	Jun Won-gu (KOR)	
3	Kota Asai (JPN)	
4	Jaber Majrashi (KSA)	

==== Heat 3 ====
Rank	Athlete	Notes
1	Choi Lae-seon (KOR)	
2	Badr Ali Shambih (UAE)	
3	Okram Bikram Singh (IND)	
4	Raja Audi (LIB)	

=== Round 2 ===
==== Heat 1 ====
Rank	Athlete	Notes
1	Kazunari Watanabe (JPN)	
2	Josiah Ng (MAS)	
3	Azizulhasni Awang (MAS)	
4	Choi Lae-seon (KOR)	
5	Hylem Prince (IND)	
6	Mahmoud Parash (IRI)	

==== Heat 2 ====
Rank	Athlete	Notes
1	Zhang Miao (CHN)	
2	Mohammad Parash (IRI)	
3	Zhang Lei (CHN)	
4	Jun Won-gu (KOR)	
5	Badr Ali Shambih (UAE)	
6	Yuen Chi Ho (HKG)	

=== Finals ===
==== Final B ====
Rank	Athlete	Notes
1	Mahmoud Parash (IRI)	
2	Badr Ali Shambih (UAE)	
3	Hylem Prince (IND)	
4	Yuen Chi Ho (HKG)	
5	Choi Lae-seon (KOR)	
—	Jun Won-gu (KOR)	DNS

==== Final A ====
Rank	Athlete	Notes
1	Azizulhasni Awang (MAS)	
2	Josiah Ng (MAS)	
3	Zhang Miao (CHN)	
4	Kazunari Watanabe (JPN)	
—	Zhang Lei (CHN)	DNF
—	Mohammad Parash (IRI)	DNF

== Final standing ==
Rank	Athlete
1st place, gold medalist(s)	Azizulhasni Awang (MAS)
2nd place, silver medalist(s)	Josiah Ng (MAS)
3rd place, bronze medalist(s)	Zhang Miao (CHN)
4	Kazunari Watanabe (JPN)
5	Zhang Lei (CHN)
5	Mohammad Parash (IRI)
7	Mahmoud Parash (IRI)
8	Badr Ali Shambih (UAE)
9	Hylem Prince (IND)
10	Yuen Chi Ho (HKG)
11	Choi Lae-seon (KOR)
12	Jun Won-gu (KOR)
13	Okram Bikram Singh (IND)
13	Kota Asai (JPN)
13	Liao Kuo-lung (TPE)
16	Jaber Majrashi (KSA)
16	Raja Audi (LIB)
—	Wu Po-hung (TPE)
