= Diving at the 2010 Asian Games – Women's 10 metre platform =

Women's 10 metre platform at the 2010 Asian Games
- Venue: Aoti Aquatics Centre
- Date: 25 November 2010
- Competitors: 12 from 7 nations

Medalists
gold medal	Hu Yadan	China
silver medal	Wang Hao	China
bronze medal	Pandelela Rinong	Malaysia

The women's 10 metre platform diving competition at the 2010 Asian Games in Guangzhou was held on 25 November at the Aoti Aquatics Centre.

== Schedule ==
All times are China Standard Time (UTC+08:00)

Date	Time	Event
Thursday, 25 November 2010	10:00	Preliminary
Thursday, 25 November 2010	17:00	Final

== Results ==
Legend

- DNS — Did not start

=== Preliminary ===
Rank	Athlete	Dive					Total
Rank	Athlete	1	2	3	4	5	Total
1	Hu Yadan (CHN)	76.50	91.20	91.20	94.05	81.60	434.55
2	Wang Hao (CHN)	69.00	81.60	81.60	84.15	81.60	397.95
3	Pandelela Rinong (MAS)	73.50	66.15	71.05	75.20	65.60	351.50
4	Kim Jin-ok (PRK)	73.50	59.40	67.20	66.65	65.60	332.35
5	Fuka Tatsumi (JPN)	64.50	66.00	70.95	65.25	64.00	330.70
6	Mai Nakagawa (JPN)	57.00	42.05	62.40	70.00	67.65	299.10
7	Traisy Vivien Tukiet (MAS)	49.50	57.60	65.25	51.30	57.60	281.25
8	Kim Un-hyang (PRK)	69.00	31.35	60.80	54.45	60.80	276.40
9	Yun Seung-eun (KOR)	63.00	43.50	63.45	43.50	47.85	261.30
10	Cho Eun-bi (KOR)	64.50	40.00	52.20	45.90	33.00	235.60
11	Della Dinarsari Harimurti (INA)	33.30	37.05	56.00	36.00	57.00	219.35
12	Choi Sut Kuan (MAC)	28.50	30.10	39.90	38.00	25.65	162.15

=== Final ===
Rank	Athlete	Dive					Total
Rank	Athlete	1	2	3	4	5	Total
1st place, gold medalist(s)	Hu Yadan (CHN)	85.50	91.20	91.20	79.20	89.60	436.70
2nd place, silver medalist(s)	Wang Hao (CHN)	81.00	86.40	83.20	89.10	86.40	426.10
3rd place, bronze medalist(s)	Pandelela Rinong (MAS)	63.00	68.85	63.80	75.20	73.60	344.45
4	Kim Jin-ok (PRK)	73.50	56.10	65.60	69.75	72.00	336.95
5	Kim Un-hyang (PRK)	57.00	47.85	68.80	82.50	54.40	310.55
6	Mai Nakagawa (JPN)	67.50	60.90	73.60	63.00	26.40	291.40
7	Fuka Tatsumi (JPN)	61.50	62.70	52.80	49.30	64.00	290.30
8	Yun Seung-eun (KOR)	54.60	55.10	48.60	54.00	56.55	268.85
9	Traisy Vivien Tukiet (MAS)	43.50	38.40	59.45	55.35	59.20	255.90
10	Cho Eun-bi (KOR)	54.00	57.60	33.35	37.80	52.80	235.55
11	Choi Sut Kuan (MAC)	28.50	29.40	34.20	39.00	27.55	158.65
—	Della Dinarsari Harimurti (INA)						DNS
