= Sepak takraw at the 2010 Asian Games – Men's team regu =

Men's team regu at the 2010 Asian Games
- Venue: Haizhu Sports Center
- Date: 16–20 November 2010
- Competitors: 79 from 7 nations

Medalists
gold medal	Thailand
silver medal	Malaysia
bronze medal	Japan
bronze medal	South Korea

The men's team regu sepak takraw competition at the 2010 Asian Games in Guangzhou was held from 16 November to 20 November at the Haizhu Sports Center.

== Squads ==
China	India	Indonesia	Japan
Ding Yuting; Ge Yusheng; Jin Jie; Li Huanhuan; Wang Gang; Wang Jian; Xu Mingchi; Yang Jiapeng; Zhang Linye; Zhou Haiyang	Sanathoi Singh Akoijam; Biken Singh Chabungbam; Kiran Kumar Singh; Gurumayum Jiteshor Sharma; Niken Singh Khangembam; Viseyie Koso; Lalhlimpuia; Nanao Singh Moirangthem; Sandeep Kumar; Gopen Singh Taiyenjam; Dharmendra Singh Thokchom; Ingoba Singh Thongam	Abrian Sihab Aldilatama; Hendra Pago; Husni Uba; Jusri Pakke; Muhammad Nasrum; Nofrizal; Saiful Rijal; Suko Hartono; Syamsul Hadi; Victoria Eka Prasetyo; Wisnu Dwi Suhantoro; Yudi Purnomo	Masanori Hayashi; Yoshitaka Iida; Yuichi Matsuda; Jun Motohashi; Tomoyuki Nakatsuka; Seiya Takano; Susumu Teramoto; Takeshi Terashima; Masahiro Yamada
Malaysia	South Korea	Thailand	
Futra Abd Ghani; Noor Azman Abd Hamid; Farhan Adam; Normanizam Ahmad; Syazwan Husin; Mohd Helmi Ismail; Nor Shahruddin Mad Ghani; Mohd Hafizie Manap; Zulkarnain Arif; Ahmad Sufi Hashim; Azman Nasruddin; Ariff Ramli	Go Jae-uk; Im An-soo; Jeong Won-deok; Kim Young-man; Kwon Hyuk-jin; Lee Gyu-nam; Lee Jun-ho; Lee Myung-jung; Park Hyeon-geun; Sin Seung-tae; Woo Gyeong-han; Yoo Dong-young	Anuwat Chaichana; Somporn Jaisinghol; Kriangkrai Kaewmian; Pornchai Kaokaew; Supachai Maneenat; Wirawut Nanongkhai; Suriyan Peachan; Suebsak Phunsueb; Siriwat Sakha; Singha Somsakul; Kritsana Tanakorn; Pattarapong Yupadee	

== Results ==
All times are China Standard Time (UTC+08:00)

=== Preliminary ===
==== Group A ====
Pos	Team	Pld	W	L	MF	MA	MD	Pts	Qualification
1	Thailand	2	2	0	6	0	+6	4	Semifinals
2	South Korea	2	1	1	3	3	0	2	Semifinals
3	Indonesia	2	0	2	0	6	−6	0	

Source: Results

Date	Time		Score		Regu 1			Regu 2			Regu 3		
Date	Time		Score		Set 1	Set 2	Set 3	Set 1	Set 2	Set 3	Set 1	Set 2	Set 3
16 Nov	08:30	South Korea	3–0	Indonesia	2–1			2–1			2–1		
16 Nov	08:30	South Korea	3–0	Indonesia	21–23	21–15	15–7	21–16	16–21	15–12	18–21	24–22	15–8
16 Nov	19:00	Thailand	3–0	Indonesia	2–0			2–0			2–0		
16 Nov	19:00	Thailand	3–0	Indonesia	21–11	21–14		21–12	21–13		21–12	21–17	
18 Nov	08:30	Thailand	3–0	South Korea	2–0			2–0			2–0		
18 Nov	08:30	Thailand	3–0	South Korea	21–19	21–12		21–15	21–13		21–17	21–18	

==== Group B ====
Pos	Team	Pld	W	L	MF	MA	MD	Pts	Qualification
1	Malaysia	3	3	0	8	1	+7	6	Semifinals
2	Japan	3	2	1	5	4	+1	4	Semifinals
3	China	3	1	2	3	6	−3	2	
4	India	3	0	3	2	7	−5	0	

Source: Results

Date	Time		Score		Regu 1			Regu 2			Regu 3		
Date	Time		Score		Set 1	Set 2	Set 3	Set 1	Set 2	Set 3	Set 1	Set 2	Set 3
16 Nov	08:30	Malaysia	2–1	China	2–0			1–2			2–0		
16 Nov	08:30	Malaysia	2–1	China	21–11	21–5		21–23	21–17	14–16	21–19	21–18	
16 Nov	14:00	India	1–2	Japan	2–0			0–2			0–2		
16 Nov	14:00	India	1–2	Japan	21–13	21–12		17–21	14–21		18–21	13–21	
17 Nov	08:30	China	2–1	India	2–1			0–2			2–0		
17 Nov	08:30	China	2–1	India	21–19	11–21	15–11	15–21	18–21		21–19	24–22	
17 Nov	14:00	Malaysia	3–0	Japan	2–0			2–0			2–0		
17 Nov	14:00	Malaysia	3–0	Japan	21–17	21–17		21–13	21–10		21–16	25–23	
18 Nov	08:30	Malaysia	3–0	India	2–0			2–0			2–0		
18 Nov	08:30	Malaysia	3–0	India	21–11	21–11		21–12	21–12		21–6	21–9	
18 Nov	14:00	Japan	3–0	China	2–1			2–0			2–1		
18 Nov	14:00	Japan	3–0	China	21–18	16–21	15–5	21–14	21–15		21–18	16–21	15–9

=== Knockout round ===
Semifinals
19 November
Thailand	2
Japan	0
19 November
Malaysia	2
South Korea	0

Final
20 November
Thailand	2
Malaysia	0

==== Semifinals ====
Date	Time		Score		Regu 1			Regu 2			Regu 3		
Date	Time		Score		Set 1	Set 2	Set 3	Set 1	Set 2	Set 3	Set 1	Set 2	Set 3
19 Nov	14:00	Thailand	2–0	Japan	2–0			2–0					
19 Nov	14:00	Thailand	2–0	Japan	21–9	21–16		21–7	21–13				
19 Nov	14:00	Malaysia	2–0	South Korea	2–1			2–1					
19 Nov	14:00	Malaysia	2–0	South Korea	21–15	19–21	15–13	19–21	21–16	15–11			

==== Final ====
Date	Time		Score		Regu 1			Regu 2			Regu 3		
Date	Time		Score		Set 1	Set 2	Set 3	Set 1	Set 2	Set 3	Set 1	Set 2	Set 3
20 Nov	14:00	Thailand	2–0	Malaysia	2–0			2–0					
20 Nov	14:00	Thailand	2–0	Malaysia	21–16	21–10		21–15	21–17				
