= Diving at the 2010 Asian Games – Men's 3 metre springboard =

Men's 3 metre springboard at the 2010 Asian Games
- Venue: Aoti Aquatics Centre
- Date: 25 November 2010
- Competitors: 17 from 9 nations

Medalists
gold medal	He Chong	China
silver medal	Luo Yutong	China
bronze medal	Yeoh Ken Nee	Malaysia

The men's 3 metre springboard diving competition at the 2010 Asian Games in Guangzhou was held on 25 November at the Aoti Aquatics Centre.

== Schedule ==
All times are China Standard Time (UTC+08:00)

Date	Time	Event
Thursday, 25 November 2010	12:00	Preliminary
Thursday, 25 November 2010	19:30	Final

== Results ==
=== Preliminary ===
Rank	Athlete	Dive						Total
Rank	Athlete	1	2	3	4	5	6	Total
1	He Chong (CHN)	86.70	68.25	74.40	88.40	63.00	87.75	468.50
2	Luo Yutong (CHN)	80.60	73.50	81.60	66.50	81.60	84.15	467.95
3	Yeoh Ken Nee (MAS)	77.50	55.50	71.40	80.85	89.25	71.40	445.90
4	Park Ji-ho (KOR)	72.00	72.00	72.00	66.65	70.50	65.25	418.40
5	Son Seong-cheol (KOR)	66.00	63.00	72.00	74.40	72.00	69.70	417.10
6	Bryan Nickson Lomas (MAS)	72.85	72.00	66.00	63.00	76.50	64.60	414.95
7	Yu Okamoto (JPN)	72.00	74.40	63.00	61.20	60.00	73.10	403.70
8	Sho Sakai (JPN)	69.00	71.30	64.50	58.50	70.95	68.25	402.50
9	Ghaem Mirabian (IRI)	64.50	68.20	64.50	49.30	60.00	52.80	359.30
10	Niño Carog (PHI)	67.50	50.40	62.00	61.20	63.00	51.00	355.10
11	Jason Poon (HKG)	66.00	63.55	51.00	54.00	61.20	49.50	345.25
12	Shahbaz Shahnazi (IRI)	58.50	58.50	58.90	49.50	61.50	48.60	335.50
13	Rashid Al-Harbi (IOC)	64.20	55.00	56.00	49.40	55.00	50.00	329.60
14	Foo Chuen Li (HKG)	60.00	53.00	56.00	56.00	35.25	50.00	310.25
15	Hamad Mohammad (IOC)	40.50	49.20	53.20	42.00	39.20	51.00	275.10
16	Somsouk Lattanathongsy (LAO)	38.40	33.60	34.65	25.00	12.60	31.20	175.45
17	Philavanh Chanthakaly (LAO)	30.00	19.60	32.20	39.15	0.00	35.00	155.95

=== Final ===
Rank	Athlete	Dive						Total
Rank	Athlete	1	2	3	4	5	6	Total
1st place, gold medalist(s)	He Chong (CHN)	90.10	73.50	85.25	91.80	85.75	99.45	525.85
2nd place, silver medalist(s)	Luo Yutong (CHN)	83.70	85.50	91.80	64.75	85.00	92.40	503.15
3rd place, bronze medalist(s)	Yeoh Ken Nee (MAS)	69.75	72.00	76.50	74.25	85.75	61.20	439.45
4	Son Seong-cheol (KOR)	70.50	70.50	72.00	74.40	67.50	71.40	426.30
5	Bryan Nickson Lomas (MAS)	72.85	69.00	74.25	42.00	78.20	76.50	412.80
6	Sho Sakai (JPN)	57.00	69.75	63.00	57.00	74.25	89.25	410.25
7	Yu Okamoto (JPN)	73.50	74.40	72.00	47.60	55.50	81.60	404.60
8	Park Ji-ho (KOR)	72.00	60.00	57.00	66.65	72.00	60.90	388.55
9	Niño Carog (PHI)	58.50	50.40	66.65	62.90	58.50	58.50	355.45
10	Ghaem Mirabian (IRI)	36.00	66.65	61.50	56.55	58.50	50.40	329.60
11	Jason Poon (HKG)	49.50	71.30	49.50	51.00	40.80	63.00	325.10
12	Shahbaz Shahnazi (IRI)	61.50	46.50	60.45	28.50	45.00	39.15	281.10
