= Karate at the 2010 Asian Games – Women's kata =

Karate competition

Women's kata at the 2010 Asian Games
- Venue: Guangdong Gymnasium
- Date: 24 November 2010
- Competitors: 14 from 14 nations

Medalists
gold medal	Rika Usami	Japan
silver medal	Huang Yu-chi	Chinese Taipei
bronze medal	Cheung Pui Si	Macau
bronze medal	Lim Lee Lee	Malaysia

The women's individual kata competition at the 2010 Asian Games in Guangzhou, China was held on 24 November 2010 at the Guangdong Gymnasium.

== Schedule ==
All times are China Standard Time (UTC+08:00)

Date	Time	Event
Wednesday, 24 November 2010	09:30	1/8 finals
Wednesday, 24 November 2010	09:30	Quarterfinals
Wednesday, 24 November 2010	09:30	Semifinals
Wednesday, 24 November 2010	09:30	Repechage 1
Wednesday, 24 November 2010	09:30	Bronze medal match
Wednesday, 24 November 2010	09:30	Final

== Results ==
=== Main bracket ===
1/8 finals
Cheung Pui Si (MAC)	5
Valena Valentina (IND)	0
Li Pui Ki (HKG)	5
Ramilia Eshmambetova (KGZ)	0
Thaviphone Salichanh (LAO)	0
Huang Yu-chi (TPE)	5
Dewi Yulianti (INA)	5
Zawu Prue (BAN)	0
Rika Usami (JPN)	5
Roji Nagarkoti (NEP)	0
Yanisa Torrattanawathana (THA)	0
Lim Lee Lee (MAS)	5

Quarterfinals
Rada Jasser (JOR)	0
Cheung Pui Si (MAC)	5
Li Pui Ki (HKG)	0
Huang Yu-chi (TPE)	5
Regina Niyazova (UZB)	0
Dewi Yulianti (INA)	5
Rika Usami (JPN)	5
Lim Lee Lee (MAS)	0

Semifinals
Cheung Pui Si (MAC)	1
Huang Yu-chi (TPE)	4
Dewi Yulianti (INA)	0
Rika Usami (JPN)	5

Final
Huang Yu-chi (TPE)	0
Rika Usami (JPN)	5

=== Repechage ===
Repechage 1
Thaviphone Salichanh (LAO)	0
Li Pui Ki (HKG)	5
Roji Nagarkoti (NEP)	0
Lim Lee Lee (MAS)	5

Bronze medal match
Li Pui Ki (HKG)	0
Cheung Pui Si (MAC)	5
Lim Lee Lee (MAS)	5
Dewi Yulianti (INA)	0
