= Sailing at the 2010 Asian Games – Boys' 420 =

Boys' 420 at the 2010 Asian Games
- Venue: Shanwei Water Sports Center
- Date: 14–20 November 2010
- Competitors: 16 from 8 nations

Medalists
| gold medal | Justin Liu; Sherman Cheng | Singapore |
| silver medal | Lee Sang-min; Yang Ho-yeob | South Korea |
| bronze medal | Ku Anas Ku Zamil; Hafizzudin Mazelan | Malaysia |

The boys' 420 competition at the 2010 Asian Games in Shanwei was held from 14 to 20 November 2010. It was an under-19 event and sailors born in or after 1991 were eligible to compete.

== Schedule ==
All times are China Standard Time (UTC+08:00)

| Date | Time | Event |
|---|---|---|
| Sunday, 14 November 2010 | 12:00 | Race 1 |
| Sunday, 14 November 2010 | 12:00 | Race 2 |
| Monday, 15 November 2010 | 12:00 | Race 3 |
| Monday, 15 November 2010 | 12:00 | Race 4 |
| Tuesday, 16 November 2010 | 12:00 | Race 5 |
| Tuesday, 16 November 2010 | 12:00 | Race 6 |
| Wednesday, 17 November 2010 | 12:00 | Race 7 |
| Wednesday, 17 November 2010 | 12:00 | Race 8 |
| Friday, 19 November 2010 | 12:00 | Race 9 |
| Saturday, 20 November 2010 | 12:00 | Race 10 |
| Saturday, 20 November 2010 | 12:00 | Race 11 |
| Saturday, 20 November 2010 | 12:00 | Race 12 |

== Results ==
Legend

- DNF — Did not finish
- DPI — Discretionary penalty imposed
- DSQ — Disqualification
- OCS — On course side
- RDG — Redress given

| Rank | Team | Race | | | | | | | | | | | | Total |
| Rank | Team | 1 | 2 | 3 | 4 | 5 | 6 | 7 | 8 | 9 | 10 | 11 | 12 | Total |
|---|---|---|---|---|---|---|---|---|---|---|---|---|---|---|
| 1st place, gold medalist(s) | Singapore (SIN); Justin Liu; Sherman Cheng | 2 | 1 | 1.5; RDG | 2 | 3 | 2 | ~~(4)~~ | 2 | 1 | 1 | 1 | 1 | 17.5 |
| 2nd place, silver medalist(s) | South Korea (KOR); Lee Sang-min; Yang Ho-yeob | ~~(9)~~; DSQ | 2.6; DPI | 1.3; DPI | 1.3; DPI | 5 | 7 | 2 | 1 | 6 | 3 | 2 | 3 | 34.2 |
| 3rd place, bronze medalist(s) | Malaysia (MAS); Ku Anas Ku Zamil; Hafizzudin Mazelan | 4 | 3 | ~~(5)~~ | 3 | 2 | 3 | 3 | 5 | 4 | 2 | 5 | 5 | 39 |
| 4 | Thailand (THA); Navee Thamsoontorn; Atiwat Chomtongdee | 1 | ~~(9)~~; OCS | 2.25; RDG | 4 | 1 | 4 | 5 | 3 | 9 DSQ | 5 | 3 | 2 | 39.25 |
| 5 | Japan (JPN); Hiroki Yamaguchi; Tetsuya Isozaki | 6 | 4 | 6 | 6 | ~~(8)~~ | 1 | 1 | 6 | 3 | 4 | 4 | 4 | 45 |
| 6 | China (CHN); Ding Mingcheng; Liu Zhen | 3 | 5 | ~~(8)~~ | 7 | 4 | 5 | 6 | 7 | 2 | 6 | 6 | 6 | 57 |
| 7 | Hong Kong (HKG); Kwan Wing Ho; Bernard Kay | 5 | ~~(9)~~; OCS | 4 | 5 | 6 | 6 | 7 | 4 | 5 | 7 | 7 | 7 | 63 |
| 8 | Iran (IRI); Mohammad Oj-Hormozi; Majid Seifi | 7 | 6 | 7 | 8 | 7 | 8 | 8 | ~~(9)~~; DNF | 7 | 8 | 8 | 8 | 82 |
