= Sepak takraw at the 2010 Asian Games – Men's regu =

Men's regu at the 2010 Asian Games
- Venue: Haizhu Sports Center
- Date: 22–24 November 2010
- Competitors: 20 from 4 nations

Medalists
gold medal	Thailand
silver medal	Malaysia
bronze medal	Myanmar
bronze medal	China

The men's regu sepak takraw competition at the 2010 Asian Games in Guangzhou was held from 22 November to 24 November at the Haizhu Sports Center.

Four teams Thailand, Malaysia, Myanmar and China played in a round-robin competition, leaving no true championship game. Thailand won the gold medal after winning all three matches.

== Squads ==
China	Malaysia	Myanmar	Thailand
Ge Yusheng; Xu Mingchi; Yang Jiapeng; Zhang Linye; Zhou Haiyang	Futra Abd Ghani; Noor Azman Abd Hamid; Farhan Adam; Normanizam Ahmad; Nor Shahruddin Mad Ghani	Aung Cho Myint; Aung Myo Swe; Si Thu Lin; Zaw Latt; Zaw Zaw Aung	Anuwat Chaichana; Kriangkrai Kaewmian; Pornchai Kaokaew; Wirawut Nanongkhai; Pattarapong Yupadee

== Results ==
All times are China Standard Time (UTC+08:00)

Pos	Team	Pld	W	L	SF	SA	SD	Pts
1	Thailand	3	3	0	6	1	+5	6
2	Malaysia	3	2	1	4	2	+2	4
3	Myanmar	3	1	2	3	4	−1	2
4	China	3	0	3	0	6	−6	0

Source: Results

Date	Time		Score		Set 1	Set 2	Set 3
22 Nov	09:00	Malaysia	2–0	Myanmar	21–18	21–18	
22 Nov	09:00	China	0–2	Thailand	10–21	11–21	
22 Nov	19:30	Malaysia	2–0	China	21–13	21–10	
22 Nov	19:30	Thailand	2–1	Myanmar	17–21	21–13	15–9
23 Nov	15:30	Myanmar	2–0	China	21–16	21–12	
24 Nov	14:30	Malaysia	0–2	Thailand	12–21	19–21	
