= Diving at the 2010 Asian Games – Women's synchronized 10 metre platform =

Women's synchronized 10 metre platform at the 2010 Asian Games
- Venue: Aoti Aquatics Centre
- Date: 23 November 2010
- Competitors: 12 from 6 nations

Medalists
gold medal	Chen Ruolin; Wang Hao	China
silver medal	Leong Mun Yee; Pandelela Rinong	Malaysia
bronze medal	Choe Kum-hui; Kim Un-hyang	North Korea

The women's synchronized 10 metre platform diving competition at the 2010 Asian Games in Guangzhou was held on 23 November at the Aoti Aquatics Centre.

== Schedule ==
All times are China Standard Time (UTC+08:00)

Date	Time	Event
Tuesday, 23 November 2010	14:00	Final

== Results ==
Rank	Team	Dive					Total
Rank	Team	1	2	3	4	5	Total
1st place, gold medalist(s)	China (CHN); Chen Ruolin; Wang Hao	54.60	55.20	76.50	84.48	89.28	360.06
2nd place, silver medalist(s)	Malaysia (MAS); Leong Mun Yee; Pandelela Rinong	47.40	49.20	67.50	72.96	74.88	311.94
3rd place, bronze medalist(s)	North Korea (PRK); Choe Kum-hui; Kim Un-hyang	52.20	46.80	66.60	50.88	68.16	284.64
4	Japan (JPN); Risa Asada; Fuka Tatsumi	48.60	46.20	60.48	62.64	63.51	281.43
5	South Korea (KOR); Cho Eun-bi; Yun Seung-eun	49.20	46.20	59.64	70.47	55.08	280.59
6	Macau (MAC); Choi Sut Kuan; Lo I Teng	45.60	46.20	43.32	40.20	25.65	200.97
