= Cycling at the 2010 Asian Games – Women's 500 metres time trial =

Women's 500 metres time trial at the 2010 Asian Games
- Venue: Guangzhou Velodrome
- Date: 13 November 2010
- Competitors: 10 from 10 nations

Medalists
gold medal	Lee Wai Sze	Hong Kong
silver medal	Guo Shuang	China
bronze medal	Hsiao Mei-yu	Chinese Taipei

The women's 500 m time trial competition at the 2010 Asian Games was held on 13 November at the Guangzhou Velodrome.

== Schedule ==
All times are China Standard Time (UTC+08:00)

Date	Time	Event
Saturday, 13 November 2010	11:40	Final

== Records ==
Prior to this competition, the existing world, Asian and Games records were as follows.

World Record	Simona Krupeckaitė (LTU)	33.296	Pruszków, Poland	25 March 2009
Asian Record	Jiang Yonghua (CHN)	34.000	Kunming, China	11 August 2002
Games Record	Guo Shuang (CHN)	35.175	Doha, Qatar	9 December 2006

== Results ==
Rank	Athlete	Time	Notes
1st place, gold medalist(s)	Lee Wai Sze (HKG)	33.945	AR
2nd place, silver medalist(s)	Guo Shuang (CHN)	34.152	
3rd place, bronze medalist(s)	Hsiao Mei-yu (TPE)	35.440	
4	Fatehah Mustapa (MAS)	35.769	
5	Kim Won-gyeong (KOR)	35.801	
6	Kayono Maeda (JPN)	36.033	
7	Jutatip Maneephan (THA)	36.384	
8	Santia Tri Kusuma (INA)	37.265	
9	Apryl Eppinger (PHI)	37.324	
10	Mahitha Mohan (IND)	39.216	
