= Karate at the 2010 Asian Games – Men's kumite 55 kg =

Karate competitions

Men's kumite 55 kg at the 2010 Asian Games
- Venue: Guangdong Gymnasium
- Date: 24 November 2010
- Competitors: 11 from 11 nations

Medalists
gold medal	Puvaneswaran Ramasamy	Malaysia
silver medal	Imad Al-Malki	Saudi Arabia
bronze medal	Hirannithishatphol Saratham	Thailand
bronze medal	Hsieh Cheng-kang	Chinese Taipei

The men's kumite 55 kilograms competition at the 2010 Asian Games in Guangzhou, China was held on 24 November 2010 at the Guangdong Gymnasium.

== Schedule ==
All times are China Standard Time (UTC+08:00)

Date	Time	Event
Wednesday, 24 November 2010	13:00	1/8 finals
Wednesday, 24 November 2010	13:00	Quarterfinals
Wednesday, 24 November 2010	13:00	Semifinals
Wednesday, 24 November 2010	13:00	Repechage 1
Wednesday, 24 November 2010	13:00	Bronze medal match
Wednesday, 24 November 2010	16:00	Final

== Results ==
=== Main bracket ===
1/8 finals
Eldor Djambaev (UZB)	4
Md Samim Osman (BAN)	1
Puvaneswaran Ramasamy (MAS)	1
Nguyễn Hoàng Hiệp (VIE)	0
Rabindra Dahal (NEP)	0
Mohammad Ghasemi (IRI)	1

Quarterfinals
Hirannithishatphol Saratham (THA)	5
Eldor Djambaev (UZB)	0
Manuel Marques (TLS)	0
Imad Al-Malki (KSA)	6
Hsieh Cheng-kang (TPE)	0
Puvaneswaran Ramasamy (MAS)	0
Mohammad Ghasemi (IRI)	3
Fazel Ahmad Ahmadi (AFG)	0

Semifinals
Hirannithishatphol Saratham (THA)	0
Imad Al-Malki (KSA)	3
Puvaneswaran Ramasamy (MAS)	1
Mohammad Ghasemi (IRI)	0

Final
Imad Al-Malki (KSA)	0
Puvaneswaran Ramasamy (MAS)	0

=== Repechage ===
Repechage 1
Nguyễn Hoàng Hiệp (VIE)	0
Hsieh Cheng-kang (TPE)	2

Bronze medal match
Manuel Marques (TLS)	0
Hirannithishatphol Saratham (THA)	1
Hsieh Cheng-kang (TPE)	1
Mohammad Ghasemi (IRI)	0
