= Sailing at the 2010 Asian Games – Boys' Optimist =

Boys' Optimist at the 2010 Asian Games
- Venue: Shanwei Water Sports Center
- Date: 14–20 November 2010
- Competitors: 11 from 11 nations

Medalists
| gold medal | Zhang Xiaotian | China |
| silver medal | Ahmad Latif Khan | Malaysia |
| bronze medal | Ryan Lo | Singapore |

The boy's Optimist competition at the 2010 Asian Games in Shanwei was held from 14 to 20 November 2010. It was an under-16 event and sailors born in or after 1995 were eligible to compete.

== Schedule ==
All times are China Standard Time (UTC+08:00)

| Date | Time | Event |
|---|---|---|
| Sunday, 14 November 2010 | 12:00 | Race 1 |
| Sunday, 14 November 2010 | 12:00 | Race 2 |
| Monday, 15 November 2010 | 12:00 | Race 3 |
| Monday, 15 November 2010 | 12:00 | Race 4 |
| Tuesday, 16 November 2010 | 12:00 | Race 5 |
| Tuesday, 16 November 2010 | 12:00 | Race 6 |
| Wednesday, 17 November 2010 | 12:00 | Race 7 |
| Wednesday, 17 November 2010 | 12:00 | Race 8 |
| Friday, 19 November 2010 | 12:00 | Race 9 |
| Friday, 19 November 2010 | 12:00 | Race 10 |
| Saturday, 20 November 2010 | 12:00 | Race 11 |
| Saturday, 20 November 2010 | 12:00 | Race 12 |

== Results ==
Legend

- DSQ — Disqualification

| Rank | Athlete | Race | | | | | | | | | | | | Total |
| Rank | Athlete | 1 | 2 | 3 | 4 | 5 | 6 | 7 | 8 | 9 | 10 | 11 | 12 | Total |
|---|---|---|---|---|---|---|---|---|---|---|---|---|---|---|
| 1st place, gold medalist(s) | Zhang Xiaotian (CHN) | 4 | 1 | 3 | 1 | 6 | ~~(9)~~ | 1 | 1 | 1 | 1 | 3 | 5 | 27 |
| 2nd place, silver medalist(s) | Ahmad Latif Khan (MAS) | 5 | 2 | 1 | 2 | 3 | 3 | 3 | 2 | 4 | 2 | 4 | ~~(7)~~ | 31 |
| 3rd place, bronze medalist(s) | Ryan Lo (SIN) | 1 | ~~(12)~~; DSQ | 5 | 4 | 2 | 1 | 4 | 3 | 2 | 5 | 1 | 6 | 34 |
| 4 | Totsapon Mahawichean (THA) | 3 | 4 | 2 | 5 | 1 | 2 | ~~(7)~~ | 6 | 3 | 3 | 5 | 1 | 35 |
| 5 | Keiju Okada (JPN) | 6 | 3 | 4 | 3 | 4 | 6 | 2 | 5 | ~~(7)~~ | 4 | 2 | 2 | 41 |
| 6 | K. C. Ganapathy (IND) | ~~(9)~~ | 5 | 6 | 6 | 9 | 7 | 6 | 4 | 8 | 6 | 6 | 4 | 67 |
| 7 | Keivan Hassanzadeh (IRI) | 2 | 7 | 8 | 8 | 8 | 4 | 8 | 8 | 6 | ~~(9)~~ | 7 | 3 | 69 |
| 8 | Kim Woo-yop (KOR) | 7 | 6 | 7 | 7 | 5 | 8 | 5 | 10 | 5 | 8 | ~~(12)~~; DSQ | 8 | 76 |
| 9 | Hamood Salem Al-Zaidi (UAE) | 8 | 8 | 9 | 9 | 7 | 5 | ~~(10)~~ | 9 | 9 | 7 | 9 | 10 | 90 |
| 10 | Avishka de Alwis (SRI) | 10 | 10 | ~~(11)~~ | 11 | 10 | 10 | 9 | 11 | 10 | 10 | 8 | 9 | 108 |
| 11 | Muhammad Mustafa Ahmed (PAK) | ~~(11)~~ | 9 | 10 | 10 | 11 | 11 | 11 | 7 | 11 | 11 | 10 | 11 | 112 |
