= Golf at the 2010 Asian Games – Women's individual =

Women's individual at the 2010 Asian Games
- Venue: Dragon Lake Golf Club
- Date: 17 November 2010 – 20 November 2010
- Competitors: 30 from 11 nations

Medalists
gold medal	Kim Hyun-soo	South Korea
silver medal	Yan Jing	China
bronze medal	Kim Ji-hee	South Korea

The women's individual competition at the 2010 Asian Games in Guangzhou was held from 17 November to 20 November at the Dragon Lake Golf Club.

== Schedule ==
All times are China Standard Time (UTC+08:00)

Date	Time	Event
Wednesday, 17 November 2010	07:00	First round
Thursday, 18 November 2010	07:00	Second round
Friday, 19 November 2010	07:00	Third round
Saturday, 20 November 2010	07:00	Fourth round

== Results ==
Rank	Athlete	Round				Total	To par
Rank	Athlete	1	2	3	4	Total	To par
1st place, gold medalist(s)	Kim Hyun-soo (KOR)	70	70	65	72	277	−11
2nd place, silver medalist(s)	Yan Jing (CHN)	69	75	74	69	287	−1
3rd place, bronze medalist(s)	Kim Ji-hee (KOR)	75	71	71	70	287	−1
4	Han Jung-eun (KOR)	74	71	68	76	289	+1
4	Li Jiayun (CHN)	73	74	71	71	289	+1
4	Ariya Jutanugarn (THA)	75	73	74	67	289	+1
7	Lin Xiyu (CHN)	75	74	71	70	290	+2
8	Mamiko Higa (JPN)	71	74	72	74	291	+3
9	Liu Yi-chen (TPE)	73	76	73	73	295	+7
10	Chihiro Ikeda (PHI)	79	75	70	72	296	+8
10	Natsuka Hori (JPN)	79	75	71	71	296	+8
12	Thidapa Suwannapura (THA)	77	74	75	72	298	+10
12	Yao Hsuan-yu (TPE)	75	71	79	73	298	+10
14	Kelly Tan (MAS)	77	73	73	76	299	+11
15	Hsu Ke-hui (TPE)	80	74	75	71	300	+12
16	Jaruporn Palakawong (THA)	79	76	74	76	305	+17
17	Mami Fukuda (JPN)	78	75	74	79	306	+18
18	Maria Piccio (PHI)	78	74	79	78	309	+21
19	Tiffany Chan (HKG)	78	76	77	79	310	+22
20	Dottie Ardina (PHI)	82	76	76	77	311	+23
21	Iman Ahmad Nordin (MAS)	81	82	79	75	317	+29
22	Shreya Ghei (IND)	80	81	78	79	318	+30
23	Vani Kapoor (IND)	82	79	81	79	321	+33
24	Gurbani Singh (IND)	82	80	80	81	323	+35
25	Michelle Cheung (HKG)	88	82	78	78	326	+38
26	Stephanie Ho (HKG)	83	80	82	82	327	+39
27	Vivienne Chin (MAS)	81	79	83	89	332	+44
28	Ngô Bảo Nghi (VIE)	87	74	89	84	334	+46
29	Chio In Nei (MAC)	88	87	80	86	341	+53
30	Lưu Thị Việt Nga (VIE)	106	97	96	97	396	+108
