= Gymnastics at the 2010 Asian Games – Men's artistic individual all-around =

Men's individual all-around at the 2010 Asian Games
- Venue: Asian Games Town Gymnasium
- Date: 13–15 November 2010
- Competitors: 91 from 22 nations

Medalists
gold medal	Teng Haibin	China
silver medal	Lü Bo	China
bronze medal	Hisashi Mizutori	Japan

The men's artistic individual all-around competition at the 2010 Asian Games in Guangzhou, China was held on 13 and 15 November 2010 at the Asian Games Town Gymnasium.

== Schedule ==
All times are China Standard Time (UTC+08:00)

Date	Time	Event
Saturday, 13 November 2010	09:30	Qualification
Monday, 15 November 2010	15:30	Final

== Results ==
Legend

- DNS — Did not start

=== Qualification ===
Rank	Athlete	Floor (gymnastics)	Pommel horse	Rings (gymnastics)	Vault (gymnastics)	Parallel bars	Horizontal bar	Total
1	Teng Haibin (CHN)	14.700	15.550	14.750	15.800	15.500	15.450	91.750
2	Hisashi Mizutori (JPN)	14.550	14.000	15.350	15.850	14.750	15.750	90.250
3	Lü Bo (CHN)	14.750	13.650	15.400	15.900	15.250	15.000	89.950
4	Anton Fokin (UZB)	14.100	14.500	14.700	15.500	15.500	14.600	88.900
5	Kyoichi Watanabe (JPN)	14.700	12.600	14.950	15.500	15.050	15.200	88.000
6	Kim Soo-myun (KOR)	15.250	13.750	13.450	15.750	14.450	15.100	87.750
7	Yoo Won-chul (KOR)	14.650	13.050	15.500	15.750	15.300	13.450	87.700
8	Takuya Nakase (JPN)	13.650	14.050	15.050	15.300	14.450	14.700	87.200
9	Yernar Yerimbetov (KAZ)	14.100	13.850	13.450	16.400	13.950	14.300	86.050
10	Stepan Gorbachev (KAZ)	14.250	13.050	14.000	15.750	14.500	14.450	86.000
11	Shek Wai Hung (HKG)	13.450	12.200	13.050	16.050	14.450	14.250	83.450
12	Mohammad Ramezanpour (IRI)	14.350	13.300	13.200	15.950	13.350	12.900	83.050
13	Chen Chih-yu (TPE)	14.250	11.500	15.750	14.250	13.450	12.900	82.100
14	Hadi Khanarinejad (IRI)	14.100	12.700	15.350	14.650	12.750	12.350	81.900
15	Đặng Nam (VIE)	14.200	12.000	13.200	15.900	13.750	12.700	81.750
16	Weena Chokpaoumpai (THA)	13.900	12.300	12.750	15.650	13.850	13.050	81.500
17	Ashish Kumar (IND)	14.750	11.800	13.300	16.100	11.800	12.900	80.650
18	Mahmood Al-Sadi (QAT)	13.700	11.200	13.800	14.650	13.650	13.500	80.500
19	Trương Minh Sang (VIE)	13.300	13.650	13.250	13.900	12.800	13.200	80.100
20	Lum Wan Foong (MAS)	12.700	12.350	13.400	14.800	13.150	13.650	80.050
21	Kittipong Yudee (THA)	13.300	11.100	13.300	14.600	13.900	13.700	79.900
22	Rartchawat Kaewpanya (THA)	12.250	11.450	13.400	15.750	13.450	13.550	79.850
23	Tu Yu-chen (TPE)	13.650	12.950	12.800	15.450	12.750	11.800	79.400
24	Ahmed Al-Dyani (QAT)	13.400	12.850	12.000	14.750	13.000	13.400	79.400
25	Ivan Olushev (UZB)	13.650	12.500	12.250	15.000	13.250	11.900	78.550
26	Amir Azami (IRI)	13.400	11.400	14.300	14.350	13.100	11.900	78.450
27	Ganbatyn Erdenebold (MGL)	13.250	12.200	13.000	15.100	11.750	12.500	77.800
28	Lu Yan-ting (TPE)	13.200	11.600	13.250	14.050	11.950	13.300	77.350
29	Zhang Chenglong (CHN)	15.350	14.450		16.050	15.200	16.100	77.150
30	Shun Kuwahara (JPN)	14.400		14.650	15.500	15.450	15.700	75.700
31	Alok Ranjan (IND)	12.850	12.350	12.600	15.000	11.250	11.650	75.700
32	Ng Kiu Chung (HKG)	12.400	10.100	13.500	15.650	12.450	10.800	74.900
33	Kim Ji-hoon (KOR)	14.450	14.500		15.600	14.350	15.900	74.800
34	Shinoj Muliyil (IND)	11.300	11.100	12.300	14.550	12.050	11.700	73.000
35	Kim Hee-hoon (KOR)	14.300	14.550	14.200	16.050		11.750	70.850
36	Phạm Phước Hưng (VIE)	14.100	13.200	14.650		15.250	13.650	70.850
37	Stanislav Valiyev (KAZ)	14.000	13.200	14.100	16.400	12.700		70.400
38	Hoàng Cường (VIE)	14.200	11.800		15.400	14.550	13.450	69.400
39	Ehsan Khodadadi (IRI)	13.750		13.650	14.600	13.550	13.400	68.950
40	Eduard Shaulov (KAZ)	14.150	13.300		14.950	13.050	13.450	68.900
41	Abdulaziz Al-Johani (KSA)	13.150	9.150	10.600	13.750	11.350	9.350	67.350
42	Tharindu Pathmaperuma (SRI)	11.750	10.700	10.350	12.250	11.400	10.700	67.150
43	Otabek Masharipov (UZB)	14.350	11.950	13.350		13.550	13.400	66.600
44	Rakesh Kumar Patra (IND)	13.000	12.450	13.500	14.600		12.750	66.300
45	Mayank Srivastava (SRI)		12.700	12.650	15.200	12.300	12.500	65.350
46	Nadika Cooray (SRI)	10.650	8.900	10.800	12.450	11.200	10.400	64.400
47	Suriyen Chanduang (THA)	12.450		14.600	14.150	11.600	11.150	63.950
48	Feng Zhe (CHN)	14.900			16.400	15.950	15.400	62.650
49	Chen Yibing (CHN)	0.000	13.700	16.200	16.100		14.200	60.200
50	Ildar Valeyev (KAZ)		13.750	14.750		15.400	14.400	58.300
51	Yang Hak-seon (KOR)	14.050		14.050	16.400	13.550		58.050
52	Ali Al-Khwaher (KSA)	11.550	6.000	9.700	14.050	11.050	5.550	57.900
53	Nguyễn Hà Thanh (VIE)	14.300			15.350	14.850	12.950	57.450
54	Jasem Gazwi (KSA)	12.300	8.750	9.850	13.650	11.000	1.850	57.400
55	Ryosuke Baba (JPN)		11.250	14.500	15.800		14.750	56.300
56	Huang Che-kuei (TPE)		14.600		14.700	13.650	12.650	55.600
57	Hsu Ping-chien (TPE)		14.150	13.700		13.950	13.800	55.600
58	Ravshanbek Osimov (UZB)			13.000	14.600	14.250	13.650	55.500
59	Sin Seob (KOR)		13.500	14.750		14.000	13.000	55.250
60	Daulet Narmetov (UZB)	13.350	14.250	12.800	14.450			54.850
61	Woranad Kaewpanya (THA)	13.850	12.700		15.650		11.400	53.600
62	Younes Zeighami (IRI)	12.050	10.650			13.900	12.900	49.500
63	Mohammed Sharif (YEM)	12.400	9.250		15.200	12.550		49.400
64	Ali Saadi (IRQ)	10.750	10.900		14.700	12.050		48.400
65	Yan Mingyong (CHN)		14.500	15.950		15.100		45.550
66	Ryotaka Deguchi (JPN)	14.400	14.950			14.550		43.900
67	Ismail Shabi (KSA)	12.050	5.050		14.450	12.250		43.800
68	Timur Kurbanbayev (KAZ)			15.250	14.800		11.900	41.950
69	Huang Hsien (TPE)	12.500		13.900	15.450			41.850
70	Habib Al-Swailah (KSA)		12.100	9.250		11.300	9.100	41.750
71	Vahid Izadfar (IRI)		13.000	13.400	15.250			41.650
72	Nashwan Al-Harazi (YEM)	14.200	10.900		15.600			40.700
73	Thitipong Sukdee (THA)		14.150	13.050		13.050		40.250
74	Maxim Petrishko (KAZ)	13.900	13.600			12.300		39.800
75	Hầu Trung Linh (VIE)		9.750	12.300	14.700			36.750
76	Mohamad Ibrahim Shami (LIB)	11.350	2.850		15.400			29.600
77	Nasser Al-Hamad (QAT)	12.800			15.100			27.900
78	David-Jonathan Chan (SIN)		14.200			13.200		27.400
79	Devesh Kumar (IND)	13.450				13.050		26.500
80	Ajar Jangam (NEP)	11.000			11.500			22.500
81	Nirajan Kunwar (NEP)	8.900			12.150			21.050
82	Surah Bahadur Singh (NEP)	6.250			12.150			18.400
83	Gabriel Gan (SIN)		12.550					12.550
—	Abdullah Karam (IOC)							DNS
—	Jawad Al-Herz (IOC)							DNS
—	Mohammad Al-Omran (IOC)							DNS
—	Naser Al-Othman (IOC)							DNS
—	Bader Al-Rashed (IOC)							DNS
—	Ali Al-Saffar (IOC)							DNS
—	Pasang Kaji Sherpa (NEP)							DNS
—	Zhong Jian (HKG)							DNS

=== Final ===
Rank	Athlete	Floor (gymnastics)	Pommel horse	Rings (gymnastics)	Vault (gymnastics)	Parallel bars	Horizontal bar	Total
1st place, gold medalist(s)	Teng Haibin (CHN)	14.500	15.300	14.950	15.650	15.550	15.150	91.100
2nd place, silver medalist(s)	Lü Bo (CHN)	14.600	14.350	15.500	15.450	15.050	14.900	89.850
3rd place, bronze medalist(s)	Hisashi Mizutori (JPN)	14.700	13.900	15.000	15.650	14.800	15.650	89.700
4	Kim Soo-myun (KOR)	14.700	15.100	14.000	15.850	14.100	15.000	88.750
5	Yoo Won-chul (KOR)	14.350	12.950	15.350	15.550	15.450	14.750	88.400
6	Takuya Nakase (JPN)	13.100	13.050	15.100	16.000	15.400	15.400	88.050
7	Stepan Gorbachev (KAZ)	13.950	13.650	14.050	15.550	14.600	14.100	85.900
8	Shek Wai Hung (HKG)	14.150	13.100	13.050	16.000	14.800	13.350	84.450
9	Chen Chih-yu (TPE)	14.000	12.600	15.350	14.100	13.500	12.800	82.350
10	Mohammad Ramezanpour (IRI)	13.900	12.350	13.250	15.800	13.800	12.950	82.050
11	Trương Minh Sang (VIE)	13.200	13.900	13.400	13.800	13.950	13.250	81.500
12	Mahmood Al-Sadi (QAT)	12.750	13.000	13.700	14.750	13.400	13.200	80.800
13	Tu Yu-chen (TPE)	13.350	12.600	12.600	15.350	12.750	13.000	79.650
14	Amir Azami (IRI)	12.800	11.800	14.350	14.550	13.150	12.650	79.300
14	Ivan Olushev (UZB)	13.000	12.300	12.450	15.250	13.850	12.450	79.300
16	Ahmed Al-Dyani (QAT)	13.150	13.150	12.000	13.100	13.650	13.150	78.200
16	Weena Chokpaoumpai (THA)	14.200	8.750	13.800	15.200	13.800	12.450	78.200
18	Ganbatyn Erdenebold (MGL)	13.400	10.500	13.350	15.200	12.750	12.400	77.600
19	Kittipong Yudee (THA)	13.350	12.750	12.950	13.100	13.400	11.600	77.150
20	Ng Kiu Chung (HKG)	13.150	11.450	14.250	14.400	11.950	10.450	75.650
21	Anton Fokin (UZB)	13.800	14.450	15.200	0.000	15.050	14.350	72.850
22	Abdulaziz Al-Johani (KSA)	13.100	9.200	10.500	13.650	11.700	10.050	68.200
23	Ashish Kumar (IND)	14.700	10.200	13.550	0.000	14.200	12.100	64.750
24	Lum Wan Foong (MAS)				0.000			0.000
