= Kota Asai =

Japanese cyclist (born 1984)

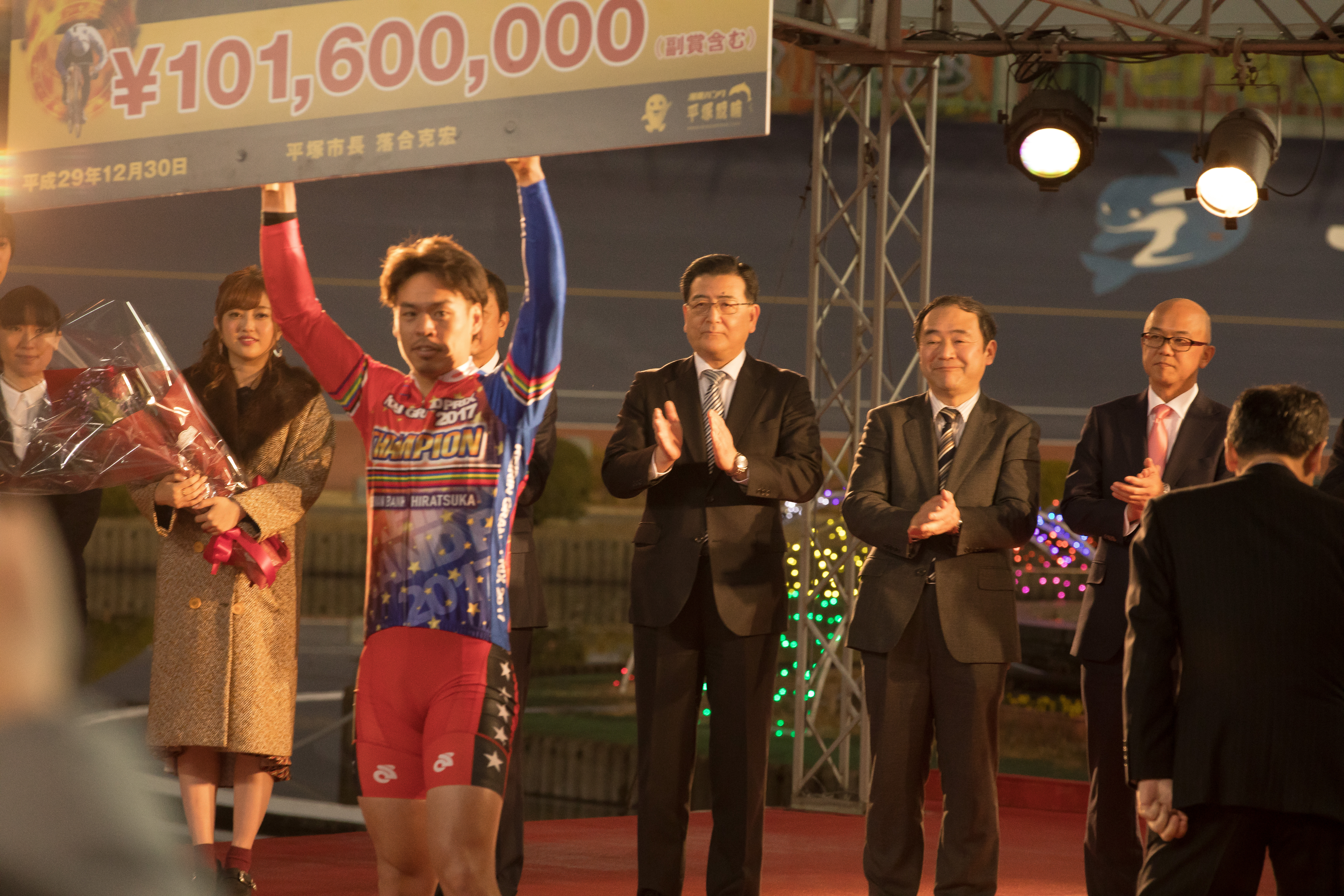
- Keirin Grand Prix 2017 (Hiratsuka Velodrome)

Personal information
- Born: 22 June 1984 (age 42)

Cycling career
- Sport: Cycling
- Discipline: Track cycling
- Role: Rider
- Rider type: sprinter

Kota Asai (浅井 康太, Asai Kōta; born 22 June 1984) is a Japanese male track cyclist, riding for the national team. He competed at the 2010 and 2011 UCI Track Cycling World Championships. He is also a professional keirin cyclist.
