= Traisy Vivien Tukiet =

Malaysian diver

Personal information
- Full name: Traisy Vivien Tukiet
- Born: 17 February 1994 (age 32) Sarawak
- Home town: Kuching, Sarawak
- Height: 153 cm (5 ft 0 in)
- Weight: 50 kg (110 lb)

Sport
- Country: Malaysia
- Partner: Leong Mun Yee
Medal record
Southeast Asian Games
| Gold medal – first place | 2011 Palembang | 10 m synchro platform |
| Gold medal – first place | 2015 Singapore | 10 m synchro platform |
| Silver medal – second place | 2009 Vientiane | 10 m platform |

Traisy Vivien Tukiet (born 17 February 1994) is a Malaysian diver. She competed in the 10 metre platform event at the 2012 Summer Olympics.
