= Beach volleyball at the 2010 Asian Games =

- Venue: Asian Games Beach Volleyball Venue
- Dates: 15–24 November 2010
- Competitors: 90 from 17 nations

Beach volleyball at the 2010 Asian Games was held in Guangzhou, Guangdong, China.

== Schedule ==
P	Preliminary round	R	Round of 16	¼	Quarterfinals	½	Semifinals	F	Finals

Event↓/Date →	15th Mon	16th Tue	17th Wed	18th Thu	19th Fri	20th Sat	21st Sun	22nd Mon	23rd Tue	24th Wed
Men	P	P	P	P	P	R	¼	½		F
Women	P	P	P	P	P	R	¼	½	F	

== Medalists ==
Event	Gold	Silver	Bronze
Men	China; Wu Penggen; Xu Linyin	China; Gao Peng; Li Jian	Japan; Kentaro Asahi; Katsuhiro Shiratori
Women	China; Xue Chen; Zhang Xi	China; Huang Ying; Yue Yuan	Thailand; Usa Tenpaksee; Jarunee Sannok

== Medal table ==
Rank	Nation	Gold	Silver	Bronze	Total
1	China (CHN)	2	2	0	4
2	Japan (JPN)	0	0	1	1
2	Thailand (THA)	0	0	1	1
Totals (3 entries)		2	2	2	6

== Participating nations ==
A total of 90 athletes from 17 nations competed in beach volleyball at the 2010 Asian Games:

- Cambodia (4)
- China (8)
- Chinese Taipei (2)
- Hong Kong (4)
- India (4)
- Indonesia (4)
- Iran (4)
- Japan (8)
- Kazakhstan (8)
- Malaysia (4)
- Oman (4)
- Qatar (4)
- South Korea (8)
- Sri Lanka (8)
- Thailand (8)
- Timor-Leste (4)
- Yemen (4)

== Final standing ==
=== Men ===
Rank	Team	Pld	W	L
1st place, gold medalist(s)	Wu Penggen – Xu Linyin (CHN)	6	6	0
2nd place, silver medalist(s)	Gao Peng – Li Jian (CHN)	7	6	1
3rd place, bronze medalist(s)	Kentaro Asahi – Katsuhiro Shiratori (JPN)	7	6	1
4	Dmitriy Yakovlev – Alexey Kuleshov (KAZ)	7	5	2
5	Andy Ardiyansah – Koko Prasetyo Darkuncoro (INA)	4	3	1
5	Parviz Farrokhi – Aghmohammad Salagh (IRI)	5	4	1
5	Alexandr Dyachenko – Alexey Sidorenko (KAZ)	4	3	1
5	Khalifa Al-Jabri – Abdullah Al-Rajhi (OMA)	5	3	2
9	Wong Chun Wai – Wong Kwun Pong (HKG)	3	1	2
9	Dian Putra Santosa – Ade Candra Rachmawan (INA)	4	2	2
9	Reza Naeini – Rahman Raoufi (IRI)	4	2	2
9	Shinya Inoue – Yoshiumi Hasegawa (JPN)	3	1	2
9	Rafi Asruki Nordin – Khoo Chong Long (MAS)	4	2	2
9	Haitham Al-Shereiqi – Ahmed Al-Housni (OMA)	4	2	2
9	Asanka Pradeep Kumara – Pubudu Ekanayaka (SRI)	3	1	2
9	Panupong Toyam – Niphon Nimnuan (THA)	4	2	2
17	Taing Mengheak – Samath Vansak (CAM)	3	1	2
17	Jameeluddin Mohammed – Ravinder Reddy Sara (IND)	3	1	2
17	Kasi Viswanatha Raju – Kiran Kumar Reddy (IND)	3	1	2
17	An Tae-young – Kwon Yong-seok (KOR)	2	0	2
17	Ndir Ababacar – Tareq Abdulhabib (QAT)	3	1	2
17	Mahesh Perera – Wasantha Rathnapala (SRI)	3	2	1
17	Aiman Al-Katheri – Ashraf Omair (YEM)	2	0	2
17	Adeeb Mahfoudh – Assar Mohammed (YEM)	2	0	2
25	Nget Sothearith – Mon Rom (CAM)	3	0	3
25	Lee Gwang-in – Ko Jun-yong (KOR)	3	0	3
25	Mahmoud Assam – Ismaeel Al-Sheeb (QAT)	3	0	3
25	Sittichai Sangkhachot – Teerapat Pollueang (THA)	3	0	3
25	Nicolau Xavier – Feliciano Soares (TLS)	3	0	3

=== Women ===
Rank	Team	Pld	W	L
1st place, gold medalist(s)	Xue Chen – Zhang Xi (CHN)	7	7	0
2nd place, silver medalist(s)	Huang Ying – Yue Yuan (CHN)	7	5	2
3rd place, bronze medalist(s)	Usa Tenpaksee – Jarunee Sannok (THA)	7	6	1
4	Luk Teck Hua – Beh Shun Thing (MAS)	7	4	3
5	Shinako Tanaka – Sayaka Mizoe (JPN)	5	3	2
5	Satoko Urata – Takemi Nishibori (JPN)	5	4	1
5	Yupa Phokongploy – Kamoltip Kulna (THA)	5	2	3
5	Kou Nai-han – Chang Hui-min (TPE)	5	3	2
9	Tse Wing Hung – Kong Cheuk Yee (HKG)	4	1	3
9	Lyudmila Issayeva – Inna Rakhmatulina (KAZ)	4	2	2
9	Tatyana Mashkova – Irina Tsimbalova (KAZ)	4	2	2
9	Lee Sun-hwa – Kwak Mi-jung (KOR)	4	0	4
9	Lee Hyun-jung – Lee Eun-a (KOR)	4	0	4
9	Nirosha Lakmini – Leena Sandamali (SRI)	4	0	4
9	Geethika Gunawardena – Sujeewa Wijesinghe (SRI)	4	1	3
9	Aliança Xavier – Mariana dos Santos (TLS)	4	0	4
