= Beach volleyball at the 2010 Asian Games – Men's tournament =

Men at the 2010 Asian Games
- Venue: Asian Games Beach Volleyball Venue
- Date: 15–24 November 2010
- Competitors: 58 from 16 nations

Medalists
gold medal	Wu Penggen; Xu Linyin	China
silver medal	Gao Peng; Li Jian	China
bronze medal	Kentaro Asahi; Katsuhiro Shiratori	Japan

The men's beach volleyball tournament at the 2010 Asian Games was held from November 15 to November 24, 2010 in Guangzhou, China.

During the preliminary round, in case of a tie between three teams in the pools the top ranked team was determined by the points ratios in the matches between the three tied teams. The second ranked team was determined by the head-to-head match result between the two remaining teams.

== Schedule ==
All times are China Standard Time (UTC+08:00)

Date	Time	Event
Monday, 15 November 2010	10:00	Preliminary round 1
Tuesday, 16 November 2010	10:00	Preliminary round 1
Wednesday, 17 November 2010	10:00	Preliminary round 2
Thursday, 18 November 2010	11:00	Preliminary round 3
Thursday, 18 November 2010	13:00	Preliminary round 2
Friday, 19 November 2010	10:00	Preliminary round 3
Saturday, 20 November 2010	12:00	Round of 16
Sunday, 21 November 2010	10:00	Quarterfinals
Monday, 22 November 2010	18:00	Semifinals
Wednesday, 24 November 2010	19:00	Bronze medal match
Wednesday, 24 November 2010	20:00	Gold medal match

== Results ==
=== Preliminary ===
==== Pool A ====
Pos	Team	Pld	W	L	Pts	SPW	SPL	SPR	SW	SL	SR	Qualification
1	Wu–Xu (CHN)	2	2	0	4	84	48	1.750	4	0	MAX	Round of 16
2	Kumara–Ekanayaka (SRI)	2	1	1	3	64	78	0.821	2	2	1.000	Round of 16
3	Al-Katheri–Omair (YEM)	2	0	2	2	62	84	0.738	0	4	0.000	

Source: Results

Date		Score		Set 1	Set 2	Set 3
16 Nov	Wu–Xu (CHN)	2–0	Al-Katheri–Omair (YEM)	21–12	21–14	
17 Nov	Kumara–Ekanayaka (SRI)	2–0	Al-Katheri–Omair (YEM)	21–18	21–18	
18 Nov	Wu–Xu (CHN)	2–0	Kumara–Ekanayaka (SRI)	21–11	21–11	

==== Pool B ====
Pos	Team	Pld	W	L	Pts	SPW	SPL	SPR	SW	SL	SR	Qualification
1	Dyachenko–Sidorenko (KAZ)	2	2	0	4	84	38	2.211	4	0	MAX	Round of 16
2	Wong–Wong (HKG)	2	1	1	3	61	76	0.803	2	2	1.000	Round of 16
3	An–Kwon (KOR)	2	0	2	2	53	84	0.631	0	4	0.000	

Source: Results

Date		Score		Set 1	Set 2	Set 3
16 Nov	Dyachenko–Sidorenko (KAZ)	2–0	An–Kwon (KOR)	21–10	21–9	
17 Nov	Wong–Wong (HKG)	2–0	An–Kwon (KOR)	21–18	21–16	
18 Nov	Dyachenko–Sidorenko (KAZ)	2–0	Wong–Wong (HKG)	21–11	21–8	

==== Pool C ====
Pos	Team	Pld	W	L	Pts	SPW	SPL	SPR	SW	SL	SR	Qualification
1	Ardiyansah–Darkuncoro (INA)	2	2	0	4	87	68	1.279	4	0	MAX	Round of 16
2	Inoue–Hasegawa (JPN)	2	1	1	3	86	89	0.966	2	3	0.667	Round of 16
3	Mahfoudh–Mohammed (YEM)	2	0	2	2	81	97	0.835	1	4	0.250	

Source: Results

Date		Score		Set 1	Set 2	Set 3
16 Nov	Ardiyansah–Darkuncoro (INA)	2–0	Mahfoudh–Mohammed (YEM)	24–22	21–12	
17 Nov	Inoue–Hasegawa (JPN)	2–1	Mahfoudh–Mohammed (YEM)	16–21	21–15	15–11
18 Nov	Ardiyansah–Darkuncoro (INA)	2–0	Inoue–Hasegawa (JPN)	21–19	21–15	

==== Pool D ====
Pos	Team	Pld	W	L	Pts	SPW	SPL	SPR	SW	SL	SR	Qualification
1	Farrokhi–Salagh (IRI)	3	3	0	6	128	101	1.267	6	0	MAX	Round of 16
2	Al-Shereiqi–Al-Housni (OMA)	3	2	1	5	119	111	1.072	4	2	2.000	Round of 16
3	Ababacar–Abdulhabib (QAT)	3	1	2	4	120	133	0.902	2	5	0.400	
4	Sangkhachot–Pollueang (THA)	3	0	3	3	116	138	0.841	1	6	0.167	

Source: Results

Date		Score		Set 1	Set 2	Set 3
15 Nov	Sangkhachot–Pollueang (THA)	1–2	Ababacar–Abdulhabib (QAT)	18–21	21–16	9–15
15 Nov	Farrokhi–Salagh (IRI)	2–0	Al-Shereiqi–Al-Housni (OMA)	21–17	21–17	
17 Nov	Sangkhachot–Pollueang (THA)	0–2	Al-Shereiqi–Al-Housni (OMA)	15–21	17–21	
17 Nov	Farrokhi–Salagh (IRI)	2–0	Ababacar–Abdulhabib (QAT)	21–14	21–17	
19 Nov	Al-Shereiqi–Al-Housni (OMA)	2–0	Ababacar–Abdulhabib (QAT)	22–20	21–17	
19 Nov	Sangkhachot–Pollueang (THA)	0–2	Farrokhi–Salagh (IRI)	15–21	21–23	

==== Pool E ====
Pos	Team	Pld	W	L	Pts	SPW	SPL	SPR	SW	SL	SR	Qualification
1	Yakovlev–Kuleshov (KAZ)	3	3	0	6	157	126	1.246	6	2	3.000	Round of 16
2	Nordin–Khoo (MAS)	3	2	1	5	149	137	1.088	5	3	1.667	Round of 16
3	Raju–Reddy (IND)	3	1	2	4	145	154	0.942	4	5	0.800	
4	Nget–Mon (CAM)	3	0	3	3	100	134	0.746	1	6	0.167	

Source: Results

Date		Score		Set 1	Set 2	Set 3
15 Nov	Yakovlev–Kuleshov (KAZ)	2–1	Raju–Reddy (IND)	21–12	20–22	17–15
15 Nov	Nordin–Khoo (MAS)	2–0	Nget–Mon (CAM)	21–16	21–18	
17 Nov	Nordin–Khoo (MAS)	2–1	Raju–Reddy (IND)	21–13	20–22	15–11
17 Nov	Yakovlev–Kuleshov (KAZ)	2–0	Nget–Mon (CAM)	21–14	21–12	
19 Nov	Nordin–Khoo (MAS)	1–2	Yakovlev–Kuleshov (KAZ)	21–19	21–23	9–15
19 Nov	Raju–Reddy (IND)	2–1	Nget–Mon (CAM)	14–21	21–13	15–6

==== Pool F ====
Pos	Team	Pld	W	L	Pts	SPW	SPL	SPR	SW	SL	SR	Qualification
1	Asahi–Shiratori (JPN)	3	3	0	6	126	71	1.775	6	0	MAX	Round of 16
2	Toyam–Nimnuan (THA)	3	2	1	5	109	98	1.112	4	2	2.000	Round of 16
3	Mohammed–Sara (IND)	3	1	2	4	105	131	0.802	2	5	0.400	
4	Assam–Al-Sheeb (QAT)	3	0	3	3	97	137	0.708	1	6	0.167	

Source: Results

Date		Score		Set 1	Set 2	Set 3
15 Nov	Asahi–Shiratori (JPN)	2–0	Mohammed–Sara (IND)	21–14	21–10	
15 Nov	Toyam–Nimnuan (THA)	2–0	Assam–Al-Sheeb (QAT)	21–13	21–15	
17 Nov	Toyam–Nimnuan (THA)	2–0	Mohammed–Sara (IND)	21–14	21–14	
17 Nov	Asahi–Shiratori (JPN)	2–0	Assam–Al-Sheeb (QAT)	21–11	21–11	
19 Nov	Toyam–Nimnuan (THA)	0–2	Asahi–Shiratori (JPN)	13–21	12–21	
19 Nov	Mohammed–Sara (IND)	2–1	Assam–Al-Sheeb (QAT)	17–21	21–16	15–10

==== Pool G ====
Pos	Team	Pld	W	L	Pts	SPW	SPL	SPR	SW	SL	SR	Qualification
1	Gao–Li (CHN)	3	3	0	6	126	72	1.750	6	0	MAX	Round of 16
2	Naeini–Raoufi (IRI)	3	2	1	5	114	88	1.295	4	2	2.000	Round of 16
3	Taing–Samath (CAM)	3	1	2	4	91	118	0.771	2	4	0.500	
4	Xavier–Soares (TLS)	3	0	3	3	73	126	0.579	0	6	0.000	

Source: Results

Date		Score		Set 1	Set 2	Set 3
15 Nov	Gao–Li (CHN)	2–0	Taing–Samath (CAM)	21–15	21–10	
15 Nov	Naeini–Raoufi (IRI)	2–0	Xavier–Soares (TLS)	21–9	21–13	
17 Nov	Naeini–Raoufi (IRI)	2–0	Taing–Samath (CAM)	21–11	21–13	
17 Nov	Gao–Li (CHN)	2–0	Xavier–Soares (TLS)	21–9	21–8	
19 Nov	Gao–Li (CHN)	2–0	Naeini–Raoufi (IRI)	21–12	21–18	
19 Nov	Xavier–Soares (TLS)	0–2	Taing–Samath (CAM)	18–21	16–21	

==== Pool H ====
Pos	Team	Pld	W	L	Pts	SPW	SPL	SPR	SW	SL	SR	Qualification
1	Al-Jabri–Al-Rajhi (OMA)	3	2	1	5 (Note: Head-to-head set points ratio: OMA 1.025, SRI 1.021, INA 0.957. INA and SRI were ranked by their head-to-head result: INA 2–1 SRI.)	124	104	1.192	4	2	2.000	Round of 16
2	Santosa–Rachmawan (INA)	3	2	1	5	141	139	1.014	4	4	1.000	Round of 16
3	Perera–Rathnapala (SRI)	3	2	1	5	138	113	1.221	5	2	2.500	
4	Lee–Ko (KOR)	3	0	3	3	88	135	0.652	1	6	0.167	

Source: Results
Notes:

Date		Score		Set 1	Set 2	Set 3
16 Nov	Santosa–Rachmawan (INA)	2–1	Lee–Ko (KOR)	15–21	21–15	15–9
16 Nov	Perera–Rathnapala (SRI)	2–0	Al-Jabri–Al-Rajhi (OMA)	21–19	23–21	
18 Nov	Santosa–Rachmawan (INA)	0–2	Al-Jabri–Al-Rajhi (OMA)	17–21	19–21	
18 Nov	Perera–Rathnapala (SRI)	2–0	Lee–Ko (KOR)	21–8	21–11	
19 Nov	Santosa–Rachmawan (INA)	2–1	Perera–Rathnapala (SRI)	21–18	18–21	15–13
19 Nov	Al-Jabri–Al-Rajhi (OMA)	2–0	Lee–Ko (KOR)	21–12	21–12	

=== Knockout round ===
Round of 16
Wu–Xu (CHN)	21	21
Al-Shereiqi–Al-Housni (OMA)	14	15
Nordin–Khoo (MAS)	18	17
Al-Jabri–Al-Rajhi (OMA)	21	21
Yakovlev–Kuleshov (KAZ)	21	21
Santosa–Rachmawan (INA)	16	17
Naeini–Raoufi (IRI)	16	10
Farrokhi–Salagh (IRI)	21	21
Ardiyansah–Darkuncoro (INA)	21	21
Wong–Wong (HKG)	19	16
Inoue–Hasegawa (JPN)	9	18
Asahi–Shiratori (JPN)	21	21
Gao–Li (CHN)	21	21
Toyam–Nimnuan (THA)	18	13
Kumara–Ekanayaka (SRI)	11	4
Dyachenko–Sidorenko (KAZ)	21	21

Quarterfinals
Wu–Xu (CHN)	21	21
Al-Jabri–Al-Rajhi (OMA)	8	10
Yakovlev–Kuleshov (KAZ)	21	21
Farrokhi–Salagh (IRI)	18	13
Ardiyansah–Darkuncoro (INA)	19	12
Asahi–Shiratori (JPN)	21	21
Gao–Li (CHN)	24	21	15
Dyachenko–Sidorenko (KAZ)	26	15	13

Semifinals
Wu–Xu (CHN)	21	21
Yakovlev–Kuleshov (KAZ)	10	12
Asahi–Shiratori (JPN)	14	20
Gao–Li (CHN)	21	22

Gold medal match
Wu–Xu (CHN)	25	21
Gao–Li (CHN)	23	14
Bronze medal match
Yakovlev–Kuleshov (KAZ)	14	10
Asahi–Shiratori (JPN)	21	21

== Final standing ==
Rank	Team	Pld	W	L
1st place, gold medalist(s)	Wu Penggen – Xu Linyin (CHN)	6	6	0
2nd place, silver medalist(s)	Gao Peng – Li Jian (CHN)	7	6	1
3rd place, bronze medalist(s)	Kentaro Asahi – Katsuhiro Shiratori (JPN)	7	6	1
4	Dmitriy Yakovlev – Alexey Kuleshov (KAZ)	7	5	2
5	Andy Ardiyansah – Koko Prasetyo Darkuncoro (INA)	4	3	1
5	Parviz Farrokhi – Aghmohammad Salagh (IRI)	5	4	1
5	Alexandr Dyachenko – Alexey Sidorenko (KAZ)	4	3	1
5	Khalifa Al-Jabri – Abdullah Al-Rajhi (OMA)	5	3	2
9	Wong Chun Wai – Wong Kwun Pong (HKG)	3	1	2
9	Dian Putra Santosa – Ade Candra Rachmawan (INA)	4	2	2
9	Reza Naeini – Rahman Raoufi (IRI)	4	2	2
9	Shinya Inoue – Yoshiumi Hasegawa (JPN)	3	1	2
9	Rafi Asruki Nordin – Khoo Chong Long (MAS)	4	2	2
9	Haitham Al-Shereiqi – Ahmed Al-Housni (OMA)	4	2	2
9	Asanka Pradeep Kumara – Pubudu Ekanayaka (SRI)	3	1	2
9	Panupong Toyam – Niphon Nimnuan (THA)	4	2	2
17	Taing Mengheak – Samath Vansak (CAM)	3	1	2
17	Jameeluddin Mohammed – Ravinder Reddy Sara (IND)	3	1	2
17	Kasi Viswanatha Raju – Kiran Kumar Reddy (IND)	3	1	2
17	An Tae-young – Kwon Yong-seok (KOR)	2	0	2
17	Ndir Ababacar – Tareq Abdulhabib (QAT)	3	1	2
17	Mahesh Perera – Wasantha Rathnapala (SRI)	3	2	1
17	Aiman Al-Katheri – Ashraf Omair (YEM)	2	0	2
17	Adeeb Mahfoudh – Assar Mohammed (YEM)	2	0	2
25	Nget Sothearith – Mon Rom (CAM)	3	0	3
25	Lee Gwang-in – Ko Jun-yong (KOR)	3	0	3
25	Mahmoud Assam – Ismaeel Al-Sheeb (QAT)	3	0	3
25	Sittichai Sangkhachot – Teerapat Pollueang (THA)	3	0	3
25	Nicolau Xavier – Feliciano Soares (TLS)	3	0	3
