= 2011 Asian Beach Volleyball Championships =

International beach volleyball competition

- Location: Haikou, China
- Dates: 8–11 December 2011

The 2011 Asian Beach Volleyball Championship was a beach volleyball event that was held from December 8 to 11, 2011 in Haikou, China.

== Medal summary ==
Event	Gold	Silver	Bronze
Men	Iran; Parviz Farrokhi; Aghmohammad Salagh	China; Xu Linyin; Wu Penggen	Kazakhstan; Alexandr Dyachenko; Alexey Sidorenko
Women	China; Zhang Xi; Xue Chen	China; Zhang Changning; Ma Yuanyuan	Australia; Natalie Cook; Tamsin Hinchley

== Participating nations ==
=== Men ===
- Australia (2)
- China (4)
- Chinese Taipei (2)
- Hong Kong (2)
- Iran (3)
- Japan (2)
- Kazakhstan (2)
- Malaysia (2)
- New Zealand (2)
- Singapore (1)
- Sri Lanka (2)
- Thailand (1)
- Vietnam (2)

=== Women ===
- Australia (2)
- China (4)
- Chinese Taipei (2)
- Hong Kong (3)
- Japan (2)
- Kazakhstan (2)
- Malaysia (1)
- Singapore (2)
- Sri Lanka (2)
- Thailand (2)
- Vanuatu (1)
- Vietnam (1)

== Men's tournament ==
=== Preliminary round ===
==== Pool A ====
Pos	Team	Pld	W	L	Pts	SW	SL	SR	SPW	SPL	SPR
1	(China) Xu–Wu	2	2	0	4	4	0	MAX	84	41	2.049
2	(Iran) Houshmand–Ghasemkhah	2	1	1	3	2	2	1.000	57	69	0.826
3	(Sri Lanka) Pubudu–Peiris	2	0	2	2	0	4	0.000	53	84	0.631

Source: Results

Date		Score		Set 1	Set 2	Set 3
08 Dec	Xu–Wu (China)	2–0	(Sri Lanka) Pubudu–Peiris	21–17	21–9	
08 Dec	Xu–Wu (China)	2–0	(Iran) Houshmand–Ghasemkhah	21–6	21–9	
09 Dec	Houshmand–Ghasemkhah (Iran)	2–0	(Sri Lanka) Pubudu–Peiris	21–17	21–10	

==== Pool B ====
Pos	Team	Pld	W	L	Pts	SW	SL	SR	SPW	SPL	SPR
1	(Kazakhstan) Dyachenko–Sidorenko	2	2	0	4	4	0	MAX	84	55	1.527
2	(Vietnam) Quốc–Tuấn	2	1	1	3	2	2	1.000	67	69	0.971
3	(Sri Lanka) Wasantha–Perera	2	0	2	2	0	4	0.000	57	84	0.679

Source: Results

Date		Score		Set 1	Set 2	Set 3
08 Dec	Dyachenko–Sidorenko (Kazakhstan)	2–0	(Vietnam) Quốc–Tuấn	21–9	21–16	
08 Dec	Dyachenko–Sidorenko (Kazakhstan)	2–0	(Sri Lanka) Wasantha–Perera	21–17	21–13	
09 Dec	Wasantha–Perera (Sri Lanka)	0–2	(Vietnam) Quốc–Tuấn	15–21	12–21	

==== Pool C ====
Pos	Team	Pld	W	L	Pts	SW	SL	SR	SPW	SPL	SPR
1	(New Zealand) Pitman–Lochhead	2	2	0	4	4	1	4.000	95	73	1.301
2	(China) Chen–Lin	2	1	1	3	3	2	1.500	92	87	1.057
3	(Japan) Aoki–Imai	2	0	2	2	0	4	0.000	60	87	0.690

Source: Results

Date		Score		Set 1	Set 2	Set 3
08 Dec	Pitman–Lochhead (New Zealand)	2–0	(Japan) Aoki–Imai	21–14	21–12	
08 Dec	Pitman–Lochhead (New Zealand)	2–1	(China) Chen–Lin	17–21	21–17	15–9
09 Dec	Chen–Lin (China)	2–0	(Japan) Aoki–Imai	21–12	24–22	

==== Pool D ====
Pos	Team	Pld	W	L	Pts	SW	SL	SR	SPW	SPL	SPR
1	(Kazakhstan) Kuleshov–Yakovlev	2	2	0	4	4	1	4.000	100	89	1.124
2	(China) Ma–Zhang	2	1	1	3	2	2	1.000	83	77	1.078
3	(Malaysia) Chong Long–Fitri	2	0	2	2	1	4	0.250	80	97	0.825

Source: Results

Date		Score		Set 1	Set 2	Set 3
08 Dec	Kuleshov–Yakovlev (Kazakhstan)	2–0	(China) Ma–Zhang	22–20	23–21	
08 Dec	Kuleshov–Yakovlev (Kazakhstan)	2–1	(Malaysia) Chong Long–Fitri	21–19	19–21	15–8
09 Dec	Chong Long–Fitri (Malaysia)	0–2	(China) Ma–Zhang	17–21	15–21	

==== Pool E ====
Pos	Team	Pld	W	L	Pts	SW	SL	SR	SPW	SPL	SPR
1	(Australia) McHugh–Slack	2	2	0	4	4	0	MAX	84	56	1.500
2	(Thailand) Sittichai–Prathip	2	1	1	3	2	2	1.000	68	67	1.015
3	(Hong Kong) Chong–Cheung	2	0	2	2	0	4	0.000	55	84	0.655

Source: Results

Date		Score		Set 1	Set 2	Set 3
08 Dec	McHugh–Slack (Australia)	2–0	(Hong Kong) Chong–Cheung	21–15	21–15	
08 Dec	McHugh–Slack (Australia)	2–0	(Thailand) Sittichai–Prathip	21–16	21–10	
09 Dec	Sittichai–Prathip (Thailand)	2–0	(Hong Kong) Chong–Cheung	21–10	21–15	

==== Pool F ====
Pos	Team	Pld	W	L	Pts	SW	SL	SR	SPW	SPL	SPR
1	(Iran) Farrokhi–Salagh	3	3	0	6	6	1	6.000	140	93	1.505
2	(Malaysia) Chiong Ung–Rafi	3	2	1	5	4	3	1.333	121	120	1.008
3	(Vietnam) Tính–Trọng	3	1	2	4	4	4	1.000	130	142	0.915
4	(Chinese Taipei) Lee Y.T.–Juan S.H.	3	0	3	3	0	6	0.000	90	126	0.714

Source: Results

Date		Score		Set 1	Set 2	Set 3
08 Dec	Farrokhi–Salagh (Iran)	2–1	(Vietnam) Tính–Trọng	21–10	20–22	15–7
08 Dec	Chiong Ung–Rafi (Malaysia)	2–0	(Chinese Taipei) Lee Y.T.–Juan S.H.	21–15	21–14	
09 Dec	Farrokhi–Salagh (Iran)	2–0	(Malaysia) Chiong Ung–Rafi	21–11	21–16	
09 Dec	Tính–Trọng (Vietnam)	2–0	(Chinese Taipei) Lee Y.T.–Juan S.H.	21–15	21–19	
09 Dec	Chiong Ung–Rafi (Malaysia)	2–1	(Vietnam) Tính–Trọng	16–21	21–16	15–12
09 Dec	Farrokhi–Salagh (Iran)	2–0	(Chinese Taipei) Lee Y.T.–Juan S.H.	21–11	21–16	

==== Pool G ====
Pos	Team	Pld	W	L	Pts	SW	SL	SR	SPW	SPL	SPR
1	(Japan) Shiratori–Asahi	3	3	0	6	6	0	MAX	126	69	1.826
2	(Australia) Boehm–Kapa	3	2	1	5	4	2	2.000	115	80	1.438
3	(Chinese Taipei) Hsu C.W.–Tseng C.C.	3	1	2	4	2	4	0.500	93	108	0.861
4	(Singapore) Leong–Zhou	3	0	3	3	0	6	0.000	49	126	0.389

Source: Results

Date		Score		Set 1	Set 2	Set 3
08 Dec	Boehm–Kapa (Australia)	2–0	(Singapore) Leong–Zhou	21–12	21–3	
08 Dec	Shiratori–Asahi (Japan)	2–0	(Chinese Taipei) Hsu C.W.–Tseng C.C.	21–14	21–14	
09 Dec	Boehm–Kapa (Australia)	0–2	(Japan) Shiratori–Asahi	17–21	14–21	
09 Dec	Leong–Zhou (Singapore)	0–2	(Chinese Taipei) Hsu C.W.–Tseng C.C.	12–21	12–21	
09 Dec	Shiratori–Asahi (Japan)	2–0	(Singapore) Leong–Zhou	21–3	21–7	
09 Dec	Boehm–Kapa (Australia)	2–0	(Chinese Taipei) Hsu C.W.–Tseng C.C.	21–11	21–12	

==== Pool H ====
Pos	Team	Pld	W	L	Pts	SW	SL	SR	SPW	SPL	SPR
1	(China) Zhou–Li	3	3	0	6	6	1	6.000	130	89	1.461
2	(New Zealand) Sam O'Dea–Ben O'Dea	3	2	1	5	5	2	2.500	128	105	1.219
3	(Iran) Dobandeh–Salehinejad	3	1	2	4	2	4	0.500	105	110	0.955
4	(Hong Kong) Lam–Ho	3	0	3	3	0	6	0.000	67	126	0.532

Source: Results

Date		Score		Set 1	Set 2	Set 3
08 Dec	Sam O'Dea–Ben O'Dea (New Zealand)	2–0	(Iran) Dobandeh–Salehinejad	21–17	21–16	
08 Dec	Zhou–Li (China)	2–0	(Hong Kong) Lam–Ho	21–11	21–4	
09 Dec	Sam O'Dea–Ben O'Dea (New Zealand)	1–2	(China) Zhou–Li	21–9	14–21	9–15
09 Dec	Dobandeh–Salehinejad (Iran)	2–0	(Hong Kong) Lam–Ho	21–12	21–13	
09 Dec	Zhou–Li (China)	2–0	(Iran) Dobandeh–Salehinejad	21–10	22–20	
09 Dec	Sam O'Dea–Ben O'Dea (New Zealand)	2–0	(Hong Kong) Lam–Ho	21–13	21–14	

=== Knockout round ===
Round of 16; 10 December
(China) Xu–Wu	21	21
(China) Ma–Zhang	19	9
(Malaysia) Chiong Ung–Rafi	14	14
(China) Zhou–Li	21	21
(Australia) McHugh–Slack	21	21
(Australia) Boehm–Kapa	13	17
(Vietnam) Quốc–Tuấn	11	21
(Kazakhstan) Kuleshov–Yakovlev	21	23
(New Zealand) Pitman–Lochhead	21	21
(Iran) Houshmand–Ghasemkhah	11	16
(New Zealand) Sam O'Dea–Ben O'Dea	21	18	13
(Iran) Farrokhi–Salagh	17	21	15
(Japan) Shiratori–Asahi	21	21
(Thailand) Sittichai–Prathip	10	15
(China) Chen–Lin	14	15
(Kazakhstan) Dyachenko–Sidorenko	21	21

Quarterfinals; 10 December
(China) Xu–Wu	21	24
(China) Zhou–Li	18	22
(Australia) McHugh–Slack	21	19	15
(Kazakhstan) Kuleshov–Yakovlev	16	21	10
(New Zealand) Pitman–Lochhead	21	18	8
(Iran) Farrokhi–Salagh	17	21	15
(Japan) Shiratori–Asahi	16	19
(Kazakhstan) Dyachenko–Sidorenko	21	21

Semifinals; 11 December
(China) Xu–Wu	21	21
(Australia) McHugh–Slack	17	15
(Iran) Farrokhi–Salagh	23	21
(Kazakhstan) Dyachenko–Sidorenko	21	12

Final; 11 December
(China) Xu–Wu	21	20	13
(Iran) Farrokhi–Salagh	15	22	15
3rd place
(Australia) McHugh–Slack	19	14
(Kazakhstan) Dyachenko–Sidorenko	21	21

== Women's tournament ==
=== Preliminary round ===
==== Pool A ====
Pos	Team	Pld	W	L	Pts	SW	SL	SR	SPW	SPL	SPR
1	(China) Zhang Xi–Xue	2	2	0	4	4	0	MAX	84	45	1.867
2	(Vietnam) Phan Thị–Tiệp	2	1	1	3	2	2	1.000	67	76	0.882
3	(Vanuatu) Elwin–Joshua	2	0	2	2	0	4	0.000	54	84	0.643

Source: Results

Date		Score		Set 1	Set 2	Set 3
08 Dec	Zhang Xi–Xue (China)	2–0	(Vietnam) Phan Thị–Tiệp	21–15	21–10	
08 Dec	Zhang Xi–Xue (China)	2–0	(Vanuatu) Elwin–Joshua	21–9	21–11	
09 Dec	Elwin–Joshua (Vanuatu)	0–2	(Vietnam) Phan Thị–Tiệp	16–21	18–21	

==== Pool B ====
Pos	Team	Pld	W	L	Pts	SW	SL	SR	SPW	SPL	SPR
1	(China) Huang Ying–Yue Yuan	2	2	0	4	4	0	MAX	84	50	1.680
2	(Kazakhstan) Pilipenko–Samalikova	2	1	1	3	2	2	1.000	75	62	1.210
3	(Singapore) Sai–Huang	2	0	2	2	0	4	0.000	37	84	0.440

Source: Results

Date		Score		Set 1	Set 2	Set 3
08 Dec	Huang Ying–Yue Yuan (China)	2–0	(Singapore) Sai–Huang	21–10	21–7	
08 Dec	Huang Ying–Yue Yuan (China)	2–0	(Kazakhstan) Pilipenko–Samalikova	21–19	21–14	
09 Dec	Pilipenko–Samalikova (Kazakhstan)	2–0	(Singapore) Sai–Huang	21–8	21–12	

==== Pool C ====
Pos	Team	Pld	W	L	Pts	SW	SL	SR	SPW	SPL	SPR
1	(Australia) Palmer–Bawden	2	2	0	4	4	0	MAX	84	49	1.714
2	(Thailand) Radarong–Udomchavee	2	1	1	3	2	2	1.000	72	70	1.029
3	(Sri Lanka) Geethika–Thakshila	2	0	2	2	0	4	0.000	47	84	0.560

Source: Results

Date		Score		Set 1	Set 2	Set 3
08 Dec	Palmer–Bawden (Australia)	2–0	(Sri Lanka) Geethika–Thakshila	21–10	21–9	
08 Dec	Palmer–Bawden (Australia)	2–0	(Thailand) Radarong–Udomchavee	21–14	21–16	
09 Dec	Radarong–Udomchavee (Thailand)	2–0	(Sri Lanka) Geethika–Thakshila	21–14	21–14	

==== Pool D ====
Pos	Team	Pld	W	L	Pts	SW	SL	SR	SPW	SPL	SPR
1	(Thailand) Sannok–Tenpaksee	2	2	0	4	4	0	MAX	84	38	2.211
2	(Hong Kong) Ng–Wong	2	1	1	3	2	2	1.000	61	73	0.836
3	(Sri Lanka) Sagari–Nirosha	2	0	2	2	0	4	0.000	50	84	0.595

Source: Results

Date		Score		Set 1	Set 2	Set 3
08 Dec	Sannok–Tenpaksee (Thailand)	2–0	(Sri Lanka) Sagari–Nirosha	21–7	21–12	
08 Dec	Sannok–Tenpaksee (Thailand)	2–0	(Hong Kong) Ng–Wong	21–10	21–9	
09 Dec	Ng–Wong (Hong Kong)	2–0	(Sri Lanka) Sagari–Nirosha	21–15	21–16	

==== Pool E ====
Pos	Team	Pld	W	L	Pts	SW	SL	SR	SPW	SPL	SPR
1	(Japan) Urata–Take	2	2	0	4	4	0	MAX	84	59	1.424
2	(Kazakhstan) Mashkova–Tsimbalova	2	1	1	3	2	2	1.000	76	60	1.267
3	(Hong Kong) Tse–Koo	2	0	2	2	0	4	0.000	43	84	0.512

Source: Results

Date		Score		Set 1	Set 2	Set 3
08 Dec	Mashkova–Tsimbalova (Kazakhstan)	2–0	(Hong Kong) Tse–Koo	21–9	21–9	
08 Dec	Mashkova–Tsimbalova (Kazakhstan)	0–2	(Japan) Urata–Take	18–21	16–21	
09 Dec	Urata–Take (Japan)	2–0	(Hong Kong) Tse–Koo	21–14	21–11	

==== Pool F ====
Pos	Team	Pld	W	L	Pts	SW	SL	SR	SPW	SPL	SPR
1	(Chinese Taipei) Chang H.M.–Kou N.H.	2	2	0	4	4	0	MAX	84	53	1.585
2	(Malaysia) Shun Thing–Teck Hua	2	1	1	3	2	2	1.000	74	80	0.925
3	(Hong Kong) Yip–Chan	2	0	2	2	0	4	0.000	62	87	0.713

Source: Results

Date		Score		Set 1	Set 2	Set 3
08 Dec	Shun Thing–Teck Hua (Malaysia)	2–0	(Hong Kong) Yip–Chan	21–16	24–22	
08 Dec	Shun Thing–Teck Hua (Malaysia)	0–2	(Chinese Taipei) Chang H.M.–Kou N.H.	16–21	13–21	
09 Dec	Chang H.M.–Kou N.H. (Chinese Taipei)	2–0	(Hong Kong) Yip–Chan	21–14	21–11	

==== Pool G ====
Pos	Team	Pld	W	L	Pts	SW	SL	SR	SPW	SPL	SPR
1	(Australia) Cook–Hinchley	2	2	0	4	4	0	MAX	84	52	1.615
2	(China) Zhang–Ma	2	1	1	3	2	2	1.000	65	65	1.000
3	(Chinese Taipei) Liu–Wu	2	0	2	2	0	4	0.000	52	84	0.619

Source: Results

Date		Score		Set 1	Set 2	Set 3
08 Dec	Cook–Hinchley (Australia)	2–0	(Chinese Taipei) Liu–Wu	21–13	21–16	
08 Dec	Cook–Hinchley (Australia)	2–0	(China) Zhang–Ma	21–12	21–11	
09 Dec	Zhang–Ma (China)	2–0	(Chinese Taipei) Liu–Wu	21–14	21–9	

==== Pool H ====
Pos	Team	Pld	W	L	Pts	SW	SL	SR	SPW	SPL	SPR
1	(China) Wang Fan–Ding Jingjing	2	2	0	4	4	0	MAX	89	51	1.745
2	(Japan) Tanaka–Mizoe	2	1	1	3	2	2	1.000	83	60	1.383
3	(Singapore) Tan–Choy	2	0	2	2	0	4	0.000	23	84	0.274

Source: Results

Date		Score		Set 1	Set 2	Set 3
08 Dec	Tanaka–Mizoe (Japan)	2–0	(Singapore) Tan–Choy	21–6	21–7	
08 Dec	Tanaka–Mizoe (Japan)	0–2	(China) Wang Fan–Ding Jingjing	24–26	17–21	
09 Dec	Wang Fan–Ding Jingjing (China)	2–0	(Singapore) Tan–Choy	21–5	21–5	

=== Knockout round ===
Round of 16; 10 December
(China) Zhang Xi–Xue	21	21
(Hong Kong) Ng–Wong	3	8
(Kazakhstan) Mashkova–Tsimbalova	21	18	15
(China) Wang Fan–Ding Jingjing	18	21	17
(Japan) Urata–Take	21	21
(Malaysia) Shun Thing–Teck Hua	7	18
(Thailand) Radarong–Udomchavee	16	21	9
(Thailand) Sannok–Tenpaksee	21	14	15
(Australia) Palmer–Bawden	23	21
(Kazakhstan) Pilipenko–Samalikova	21	11
(China) Zhang–Ma	21	21
(Chinese Taipei) Chang H.M.–Kou N.H.	14	8
(Australia) Cook–Hinchley	21	21
(Japan) Tanaka–Mizoe	18	19
(Vietnam) Phan Thị–Tiệp	11	15
(China) Huang Ying–Yue Yuan	21	21

Quarterfinals; 10 December
(China) Zhang Xi–Xue	21	21
(China) Wang Fan–Ding Jingjing	12	19
(Japan) Urata–Take	21	21
(Thailand) Sannok–Tenpaksee	19	16
(Australia) Palmer–Bawden	16	21	7
(China) Zhang–Ma	21	15	15
(Australia) Cook–Hinchley	21	14	15
(China) Huang Ying–Yue Yuan	19	21	5

Semifinals; 11 December
(China) Zhang Xi–Xue	21	21
(Japan) Urata–Take	15	6
(China) Zhang–Ma	21	21
(Australia) Cook–Hinchley	18	13

Final; 11 December
(China) Zhang Xi–Xue	21	21
(China) Zhang–Ma	12	13
3rd place
(Japan) Urata–Take	10	16
(Australia) Cook–Hinchley	21	21
