= Shooting at the 2010 Asian Games – Men's 50 metre rifle prone =

Men's 50 metre rifle prone at the 2010 Asian Games
- Venue: Aoti Shooting Range
- Dates: 15 November 2010
- Competitors: 55 from 22 nations

Medalists
gold medal	Kim Hak-man	South Korea
silver medal	Yuriy Melsitov	Kazakhstan
bronze medal	Tian Hui	China

The men's 50 metre rifle prone competition at the 2010 Asian Games in Guangzhou, China was held on 15 November at the Aoti Shooting Range.

== Schedule ==
All times are China Standard Time (UTC+08:00)

Date	Time	Event
Monday, 15 November 2010	09:00	Qualification
Monday, 15 November 2010	11:30	Final

== Records ==
Prior to this competition, the existing world, Asian and Games records were as follows.

Qualification
World Record	Viatcheslav Botchkarev (URS)	600	Zagreb, Yugoslavia	13 July 1989
Asian Record	Sergey Belyayev (KAZ)	599	Hiroshima, Japan	11 October 1994
Games Record	Sergey Belyayev (KAZ)	599	Hiroshima, Japan	11 October 1994
Final
World Record	Christian Klees (GER)	704.8	Atlanta, United States	25 July 1996
Asian Record	Sergey Belyayev (KAZ)	703.3	Atlanta, United States	25 July 1996
Games Record	Sergey Belyayev (KAZ)	702.1	Hiroshima, Japan	11 October 1994

== Results ==
Legend

- DNS — Did not start

=== Qualification ===
Rank	Athlete	Series						Total	Xs	S-off	Notes
Rank	Athlete	1	2	3	4	5	6	Total	Xs	S-off	Notes
1	Kim Jong-hyun (KOR)	100	99	99	100	100	98	596	41		
2	Kim Hak-man (KOR)	99	99	98	100	99	100	595	40		
3	Han Jin-seop (KOR)	99	99	100	99	99	98	594	40		
4	Yuriy Melsitov (KAZ)	97	100	98	100	100	99	594	37		
5	Tian Hui (CHN)	99	100	97	98	99	100	593	40		
6	Hamed Al-Khatri (OMA)	100	99	96	98	100	100	593	35		
7	Tian Pu (CHN)	97	98	99	100	100	98	592	38		
8	Mangala Samarakoon (SRI)	97	98	99	98	100	100	592	29		
9	Khalid Al-Anazi (KSA)	99	99	99	99	97	98	591	36		
10	Midori Yajima (JPN)	98	97	99	98	99	100	591	35		
11	Jamal Al-Sebbah (BRN)	96	97	100	100	99	99	591	34		
12	Nguyễn Thành Đạt (VIE)	96	100	97	99	99	99	590	33		
13	Hariom Singh (IND)	99	97	97	99	99	99	590	32		
14	Sasan Shahsavari (IRI)	100	97	99	98	100	96	590	27		
15	Alexandr Yermakov (KAZ)	97	99	98	99	97	99	589	36		
16	Tevarit Majchacheep (THA)	97	98	98	98	100	98	589	33		
17	Wang Weiyi (CHN)	98	98	98	99	98	98	589	32		
18	Ramjan Ali (BAN)	97	99	97	98	99	99	589	31		
19	Dondovyn Ganzorig (MGL)	97	100	99	99	98	96	589	30		
20	Ali Al-Muhannadi (QAT)	99	97	98	99	99	96	588	37		
21	Igor Pirekeyev (KAZ)	97	98	99	98	99	97	588	36		
22	Toshikazu Yamashita (JPN)	97	98	98	98	100	97	588	31		
23	Kasmijan Kimin (SIN)	96	99	98	98	98	99	588	24		
24	Gagan Narang (IND)	97	99	95	100	98	98	587	28		
25	Khalaf Al-Khatri (OMA)	98	97	99	99	98	96	587	27		
26	Hisyam Adzha (MAS)	97	98	96	96	100	100	587	25		
27	Surendra Singh Rathod (IND)	97	99	97	98	97	98	586	33		
28	Ong Jun Hong (SIN)	96	99	98	97	99	97	586	30		
29	Dadallah Al-Bulushi (OMA)	95	99	98	98	98	98	586	28		
30	Attapon Uea-aree (THA)	96	97	100	97	99	97	586	25		
31	Taufick Shahrear Khan (BAN)	98	97	100	97	94	99	585	18		
32	Amin Heidari (IRI)	94	99	98	97	99	97	584	30		
33	Mohd Shahril Sahak (MAS)	99	98	96	98	99	94	584	27		
34	Dương Anh Quân (VIE)	97	99	96	95	98	99	584	25		
35	Ruslan Ismailov (KGZ)	99	100	96	96	96	96	583	26		
36	Sunhat Al-Otaibi (KSA)	96	98	100	98	95	96	583	24		
37	Andy Chee (SIN)	97	98	96	99	95	97	582	24		
38	Abdulla Al-Madeed (QAT)	95	98	98	98	97	96	582	22		
39	Vũ Thành Hưng (VIE)	97	96	98	99	97	95	582	20		
40	Komkrit Kongnamchok (THA)	97	98	95	97	97	97	581	26		
41	Lin Aung (MYA)	95	97	99	97	98	95	581	26		
42	Aung Nyein Ni (MYA)	96	97	99	99	96	94	581	26		
43	Tsedevdorjiin Mönkh-Erdene (MGL)	97	96	96	97	99	96	581	22		
44	Abdullah Hel Baki (BAN)	98	98	97	99	94	94	580	24		
45	Nurrahimin Abdul Halim (MAS)	97	96	97	98	96	95	579	27		
46	Abdulla Al-Ahmad (QAT)	96	96	94	98	99	96	579	25		
47	Ebrahim Inanloo (IRI)	98	95	98	96	97	95	579	22		
48	Khalid Al-Zamil (KSA)	98	96	94	98	94	98	578	24		
49	Boldbaataryn Bishrel (MGL)	97	96	91	99	98	97	578	23		
50	Aung Thura (MYA)	95	100	96	93	97	94	575	25		
51	Sarath Chandrasiri (SRI)	95	96	97	97	93	97	575	21		
52	Krishantha Kodikara (SRI)	95	93	97	96	94	91	566	15		
53	Jayson Valdez (PHI)	90	94	97	94	97	92	564	16		
54	Ahmed Mumthaz (MDV)	95	95	97	93	92	84	556	14		
—	Abdullah Al-Harbi (IOC)							DNS			

=== Final ===
Rank	Athlete	Qual.	Final											Total	S-off	Notes
Rank	Athlete	Qual.	1	2	3	4	5	6	7	8	9	10	Total	Total	S-off	Notes
1st place, gold medalist(s)	Kim Hak-man (KOR)	595	10.3	10.3	9.7	9.9	10.7	10.6	10.9	9.8	10.3	10.8	103.3	698.3		
2nd place, silver medalist(s)	Yuriy Melsitov (KAZ)	594	10.0	10.1	10.9	10.1	10.7	10.0	10.2	10.7	10.7	10.5	103.9	697.9		
3rd place, bronze medalist(s)	Tian Hui (CHN)	593	10.0	10.4	10.7	10.4	10.8	10.6	9.9	10.4	10.4	10.8	104.4	697.4		
4	Han Jin-seop (KOR)	594	10.6	10.4	10.3	9.7	10.2	9.8	10.0	10.2	10.6	10.6	102.4	696.4		
5	Mangala Samarakoon (SRI)	592	10.1	10.6	10.3	10.9	10.0	10.3	10.6	10.7	10.3	10.4	104.2	696.2		
6	Tian Pu (CHN)	592	10.4	10.4	9.7	10.5	10.1	10.7	10.3	10.7	10.5	10.3	103.6	695.6	10.6	
7	Kim Jong-hyun (KOR)	596	9.3	10.4	9.9	10.5	10.7	9.3	10.3	9.5	10.2	9.5	99.6	695.6	10.4	
8	Hamed Al-Khatri (OMA)	593	10.0	9.6	9.3	10.7	10.1	10.7	10.0	10.2	10.4	9.9	100.9	693.9		
