= 2010 Asian Games opening ceremony =

- Part of 2010 Asian Games
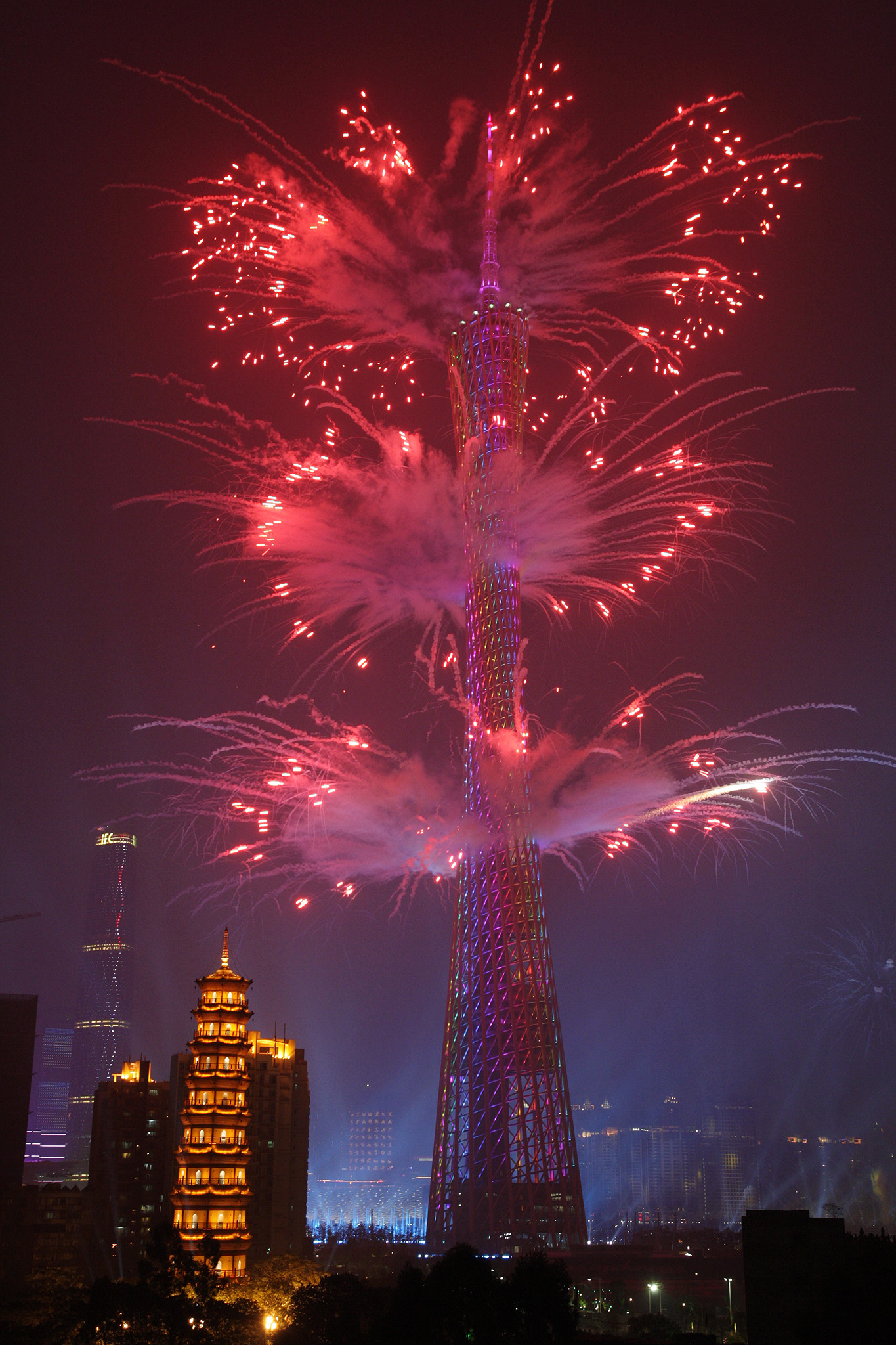
- Firework displays at the Canton Tower
- Date: 12 November 2010
- Time: 20:00 – 22:05 CST (UTC+8)
- Venue: Haixinsha Island
- Location: Guangzhou, Guangdong, China

The 2010 Asian Games opening ceremony officially began at 8:00pm China Standard Time (UTC+8) on November 12, 2010. The ceremony took place along the Pearl River on Haixinsha Island, mark it the first time in history that an Asian Games ceremony was held outside the main Games stadium. In front of 30,000 spectators, it lasted four hours, featured about 6,000 performers, with at least 40,000 of fireworks. The ceremony was directed and choreographed by Chen Weiya (陈维亚), who was assistant director to Zhang Yimou in 2008 Summer Olympics opening ceremony and was filmed by Guangzhou Asian Games Broadcasting (GAB).

== Sequence of events ==
=== Pre-ceremonial events ===
Prior to the opening ceremony, athletes and officials from 45 National Olympic Committees (NOC) were paraded by boat around the Pearl River with distance of 9.3 km to showcase the Cantonese culture.

=== Welcoming ceremony ===
After the countdown, the opening began with firework displays at Canton Tower and around Haixinsha Island. Afterwards eight PLAGF Honor Guard Soldiers received the flag of the People's Republic of China from two children who then unfurled and raised it up, accompanied by the national anthem March of the Volunteers.

=== Artistic section ===
The artistic section, dubbed "Dream" began at 8:06pm. The beginning saw a drop of water shown on eight giant retractable screens followed by a boy sat in a giant leaf slowly descending from the sky. By this time the centre stage was flooded with water and the men on horseback rode onto the arena.

The next portion "Water of the Earth" saw dancers perform and form a series of flowers. Initially five smaller flowers were formed before eventually the performers came together to form one big flower bloom. Children dancers then came out with lanterns followed by neon light dancers.

Afterwards the segment "The Boat of the Sea" saw two main dancers perform in the centre stage along with others in the background. A giant expedition boat then entered the stage with dancers acting as waves in an intense storm. The boat measured 28.8 metres long, 8 metres wide and 18 metres high. The boat then reached its destination.

In the penultimate segment, which was known as "Sail of the White Clouds", Chinese pianist Lang Lang opened with song "Light". The song was sung by Zhang Ziyi and written by lyricist Albert Leung and composer Li Hai-ying (李海鹰). 180 dancers twirled in the air and converged on the water. Watercraft riders then created a series of water displays. High wire performers then put up a series of acts in front of the giant screens to form waves, seesaws, smiley faces, birds and other shapes.

Before going into the final segment, a one-minute segment known as the "Green Minute" showed people from each district of Guangzhou bring pots of plants to display, displaying Guangzhou as a green city.

The last segment known as "The Invitation of the Flower City" started with a stage full of drummers. A group of hostesses joined the performance. China's Wei Wei, Tang Jing (谭晶), Hong Kong's Joey Yung, Taiwan's David Tao and South Korea's Kim Hyun Joong performed the games' official song "Sunshine Again". The cauldron was then reveal when it emerged from the ground as a four end tower. Fireworks then lit up the area, followed by watercraft and boat exhibitions.

=== Parade of Nations ===
All athletes and officials from 44 National Olympic Committees and Kuwait entered the site in English alphabetical order as per Olympic Council of Asia protocol with the host country entering last. Due to the NOC suspension, Kuwaiti athletes entered the site as the penultimate team under the Olympic flag with the banner "Athletes from Kuwait". Each NOC was led by a national flagbearer. During the parade of the NOCs, a local song from each country was played when the country marched to the arena.

Whilst most countries entered under their short names, a few entered under more formal or alternative names, sometimes due to political disputes. Taiwan (Republic of China) entered with the compromised name and flag of "Chinese Taipei" under T. Unlike last edition's opening ceremony, the two Korea's marched separately from each other. South Korea entered as "Republic of Korea" under K, while North Korea entered as "Democratic People's Republic of Korea" under D. The formal English names of North Korea, South Korea, and Laos were abbreviated on the placards, but announced in full.

Below is list of national flagbearer during the ceremony.

Order	Nation	Chinese name	Pinyin	Flag bearer	Sport
1	Afghanistan (AFG)	阿富汗	Āfùhàn		
2	Bahrain (BRN)	巴林	Bālín		
3	Bangladesh (BAN)	孟加拉国	Mèngjiālāguó		
4	Bhutan (BHU)	不丹	Bùdān		
5	Brunei (BRU)	文莱	Wénlái	Lee Ying Shi	Wushu
6	Cambodia (CAM)	柬埔寨	Jiǎnpǔzhài	Chhoeung Puthearim	Taekwondo
7	North Korea (PRK) (DPR Korea)	朝鲜	Cháoxiǎn		
8	Hong Kong (HKG) (Hong Kong, China)	中国香港	Zhōngguó Xiānggǎng	Yip Pui Yin	Badminton
9	India (IND)	印度	Yìndù	Gagan Narang	Shooting
10	Indonesia (INA)	印度尼西亚	Yìndùníxīyà	Ade Candra Rachmawan	Beach volleyball
11	Iran (IRI)	伊朗	Yīlǎng	Samad Nikkhah Bahrami	Basketball
12	Iraq (IRQ)	伊拉克	Yīlākè	Haider Nawzad	Rowing
13	Japan (JPN)	日本	Rìběn	Reiko Shiota	Badminton
14	Jordan (JOR)	约旦	Yuēdàn		
15	Kazakhstan (KAZ)	哈萨克斯坦	Hāsàkèsītǎn		
16	South Korea (KOR) (R.O.Korea)	韩国	Hánguó	Yoon Kyung-shin	Handball
17	Kyrgyzstan	吉尔吉斯斯坦	Jíěrjísīsītǎn		
18	Laos (LAO) (Lao PDR)	老挝	Lǎowō		
19	Lebanon (LIB)	黎巴嫩	Líbānèn		
20	Macau (MAC) (Macao, China)	中国澳门	Zhōngguó Àomén	Au Ieong Sin Ieng	Synchronized swimming
21	Malaysia (MAS)	马来西亚	Mǎláixīyà	Koo Kien Keat	Badminton
22	Maldives (MDV)	马尔代夫	Mǎěrdàifū		
23	Mongolia (MGL)	蒙古	Měnggǔ		
24	Myanmar (MYA)	缅甸	Miǎndiàn		
25	Nepal (NEP)	尼泊尔	Níbóěr		
26	Oman (OMA)	阿曼	Āmàn		
27	Pakistan (PAK)	巴基斯坦	Bājīsītǎn	Zeeshan Ashraf	Field hockey
28	Palestine (PLE)	巴勒斯坦	Bālèsītǎn		
29	Philippines (PHI)	菲律宾	Fēilǜbīn	Mikee Cojuangco-Jaworski	Equestrian
30	Qatar (QAT)	卡塔尔	Kǎtǎěr	Ali Al-Rumaihi	Equestrian
31	Saudi Arabia (KSA)	沙特	Shātè		
32	Singapore (SIN)	新加坡	Xīnjiāpō	Jasmine Yeong-Nathan	Bowling
33	Sri Lanka (SRI)	斯里兰卡	Sīlǐ Lánkǎ	Mithun Perera	Golf
34	Syria (SYR)	叙利亚	Xùlìyà		
35	Chinese Taipei (TPE)	中华台北	Zhōnghuá Táiběi	Lin Chih-sheng	Baseball
36	Tajikistan (TJK)	塔吉克斯坦	Tǎjíkèsītǎn		
37	Thailand (THA)	泰国	Tàiguó	Danai Udomchoke	Tennis
38	Timor-Leste (TLS) (Timor-Leste)	东帝汶	Dōngdìwèn		
39	Turkmenistan (TKM)	土库曼斯坦	Tǔkùmànsītǎn		
40	United Arab Emirates (UAE)	阿联酋	Āliánqiú		
41	Uzbekistan (UZB)	乌兹别克斯坦	Wūzībiékèsītǎn		
42	Vietnam (VIE)	越南	Yuènán	Ngô Văn Kiều	Volleyball
43	Yemen (YEM)	也门	Yěmén		
44	Athletes from Kuwait (IOC)	科威特运动员	Kēwēitè Yùn dóng yuán		
45	China (CHN)	中国	Zhōngguó	Jin Ziwei	Rowing

=== Speeches ===
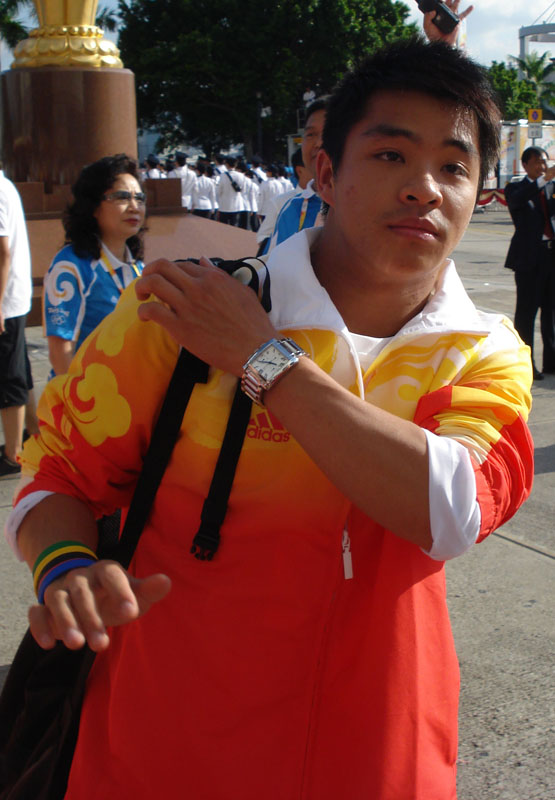
Diver He Chong lit the main flame.

A few people gave welcoming speech, they were:

1. Huang Huahua – Executive President of Guangzhou Asian Games Organising Committee (GAGOC), Governor of Guangdong
2. Liu Peng (刘鹏) – President of GAGOC, President of Chinese Olympic Committee (COC)
3. Sheikh Ahmed Al-Fahad Al-Ahmed Al-Sabah – President of Olympic Council of Asia (OCA)

Afterwards, Premier Wen Jiabao of the State Council of the People's Republic of China declared the Games to be officially open, making him the first and as of 2026 only non-head of state to open the Asian Games. It was followed was a large scale of fireworks erupt from the Canton Tower and Pearl River delta once again. Sun Nan and Mao Amin then performed the official theme song "Reunion" (Chinese: 重逢; pinyin: Chóngféng), and flag of OCA was carried in by eight athletes.

The eight athletes who carried in the flag were:

1. Li Xiaopeng (李小鹏) – gymnast
2. Yang Boyong (杨伯镛) – basketball coach
3. Meng Guanliang (孟关良) – canoer
4. Huang Jiangang (黄建刚) – wushu
5. Wang Liping (王丽萍) – race walker
6. Lu Yuansheng (陆元盛) – table tennis
7. Gao Ling (高崚) – badminton player
8. Jia Zhanbo (贾占波) – shooter

As flag of the OCA was raised, the official anthem of OCA was played. Fu Haifeng took the athlete's oath while gymnastics referee, Yan Ninan took the judge's oath.

=== Lighting ceremony ===
In the closing stages, dragon boat team leader Wu Guochong (吴国冲) carried the torch through the Pearl River into the stage. The torch was relayed by three athletes, before being passed to the final torchbearer. The three were:

1. Chen Yibing (陈一冰) – 2008 Olympic gold medalist gymnast
2. Rong Zhixing (容志行) – ex-footballer
3. Deng Yaping (邓亚萍) – Olympic gold medalist table tennis

The final torchbearer, Olympic gold medalist diver He Chong (何冲) was accompanied by two children, Xiong Yuxiang (熊钰翔) and daughter of director, Chen Jiayu (陈佳雨). The trio used the flame to light the fuse of a traditional Chinese firecraker that produced an explosion which ignited the cauldron tower directly above it. Song Zuying (宋祖英) then performed the song "Smile" (Chinese: 微笑; pinyin: Wéixiào). Fireworks were set off in the air and around the arena to conclude the opening ceremony.
