= Beach volleyball at the 2006 Asian Games – Men's tournament =

Men at the 2006 Asian Games
- Venue: Doha Sports City
- Date: 2–11 December 2006
- Competitors: 46 from 15 nations

Medalists
gold medal	Zhou Shun; Li Jian	China
silver medal	Wu Penggen; Xu Linyin	China
bronze medal	Agus Salim; Supriadi	Indonesia

The men's beach volleyball tournament at the 2006 Asian Games was held from December 2 to December 11, 2006, in Doha, Qatar.

== Schedule ==
All times are Arabia Standard Time (UTC+03:00)

Date	Time	Event
Saturday, 2 December 2006	10:00	Round 1
Sunday, 3 December 2006	13:00	Round 1
Monday, 4 December 2006	10:00	Round 2
Tuesday, 5 December 2006	10:00	Rank 17
Wednesday, 6 December 2006	14:00	Round 3
Thursday, 7 December 2006	14:00	Rank 13
Friday, 8 December 2006	14:00	Rank 9
Friday, 8 December 2006	18:00	Round 4
Saturday, 9 December 2006	14:00	Rank 7
Saturday, 9 December 2006	18:00	Rank 5
Sunday, 10 December 2006	15:00	Semifinals
Monday, 11 December 2006	15:00	Bronze medal match
Monday, 11 December 2006	17:00	Final

== Results ==
=== Double elimination round ===
==== Round 1 ====
Date		Score		Set 1	Set 2	Set 3
02 Dec	Nadeem–Fathuhulla (MDV)	0–2	Al-Maqbali–Al-Farsi (OMA)	14–21	8–21	
02 Dec	Hallyýew–Batyrow (TKM)	0–2	Isa–Abdulla (BRN)	19–21	19–21	
02 Dec	Tupaz–Verayo (PHI)	2–0	Al-Jabri–Al-Subhi (OMA)	21–12	21–14	
03 Dec	Odeh–Asfour (PLE)	1–2	Khoo–Latif (MAS)	21–17	14–21	11–15
03 Dec	Parwees–Qarqoor (BRN)	2–0	John–Poothathan (IND)	21–15	21–19	
03 Dec	Som–Koung (CAM)	1–2	Salim–Supriadi (INA)	23–21	21–23	11–15
03 Dec	Silva–Perera (SRI)	2–1	Mohammed–Tilkam (IND)	21–18	21–23	15–12

==== Round 2 ====
Date		Score		Set 1	Set 2	Set 3
04 Dec	Wu–Xu (CHN)	2–0	Al-Maqbali–Al-Farsi (OMA)	21–11	21–14	
04 Dec	Ardiyansah–Darkuncoro (INA)	2–0	Al-Jamani–Benlouaer (QAT)	24–22	21–15	
04 Dec	Vorobyev–Sidorenko (KAZ)	2–0	Isa–Abdulla (BRN)	21–16	21–16	
04 Dec	Tupaz–Verayo (PHI)	0–2	Zhou–Li (CHN)	10–21	14–21	
04 Dec	Nishimura–Watanabe (JPN)	2–0	Khoo–Latif (MAS)	21–14	21–5	
04 Dec	Parwees–Qarqoor (BRN)	0–2	Saulko–Zabuslayev (KAZ)	12–21	11–21	
04 Dec	Anber–Al-Kuwari (QAT)	0–2	Salim–Supriadi (INA)	7–21	17–21	
04 Dec	Silva–Perera (SRI)	0–2	Asahi–Shiratori (JPN)	13–21	9–21	

==== Rank 17 ====
Date		Score		Set 1	Set 2	Set 3
05 Dec	Nadeem–Fathuhulla (MDV)	0–2	Silva–Perera (SRI)	11–21	10–21	
05 Dec	Hallyýew–Batyrow (TKM)	0–2	Parwees–Qarqoor (BRN)	16–21	12–21	
05 Dec	Al-Jabri–Al-Subhi (OMA)	2–0	Khoo–Latif (MAS)	21–15	21–19	
05 Dec	Odeh–Asfour (PLE)	0–2	Tupaz–Verayo (PHI)	8–21	10–21	
05 Dec	John–Poothathan (IND)	2–0	Isa–Abdulla (BRN)	26–24	21–14	
05 Dec	Som–Koung (CAM)	2–1	Al-Jamani–Benlouaer (QAT)	21–16	14–21	15–9
05 Dec	Mohammed–Tilkam (IND)	2–0	Al-Maqbali–Al-Farsi (OMA)	21–17	21–16	

==== Round 3 ====
Date		Score		Set 1	Set 2	Set 3
06 Dec	Wu–Xu (CHN)	2–0	Ardiyansah–Darkuncoro (INA)	21–19	21–19	
06 Dec	Vorobyev–Sidorenko (KAZ)	1–2	Zhou–Li (CHN)	21–19	16–21	11–15
06 Dec	Nishimura–Watanabe (JPN)	2–1	Saulko–Zabuslayev (KAZ)	16–21	21–17	15–9
06 Dec	Salim–Supriadi (INA)	2–0	Asahi–Shiratori (JPN)	25–23	21–17	

==== Rank 13 ====
Date		Score		Set 1	Set 2	Set 3
07 Dec	Silva–Perera (SRI)	2–1	Anber–Al-Kuwari (QAT)	21–23	21–18	15–9
07 Dec	Parwees–Qarqoor (BRN)	1–2	Al-Jabri–Al-Subhi (OMA)	21–19	17–21	12–15
07 Dec	Tupaz–Verayo (PHI)	1–2	John–Poothathan (IND)	21–19	19–21	10–15
07 Dec	Som–Koung (CAM)	2–0	Mohammed–Tilkam (IND)	21–19	22–20	

==== Rank 9 ====
Date		Score		Set 1	Set 2	Set 3
08 Dec	Silva–Perera (SRI)	0–2	Vorobyev–Sidorenko (KAZ)	9–21	19–21	
08 Dec	Al-Jabri–Al-Subhi (OMA)	0–2	Ardiyansah–Darkuncoro (INA)	17–21	20–22	
08 Dec	John–Poothathan (IND)	0–2	Asahi–Shiratori (JPN)	13–21	12–21	
08 Dec	Som–Koung (CAM)	0–2	Saulko–Zabuslayev (KAZ)	15–21	18–21	

==== Round 4 ====
Date		Score		Set 1	Set 2	Set 3
08 Dec	Wu–Xu (CHN)	2–0	Zhou–Li (CHN)	21–14	21–16	
08 Dec	Nishimura–Watanabe (JPN)	0–2	Salim–Supriadi (INA)	16–21	15–21	

==== Rank 7 ====
Date		Score		Set 1	Set 2	Set 3
09 Dec	Vorobyev–Sidorenko (KAZ)	0–2	Ardiyansah–Darkuncoro (INA)	21–23	17–21	
09 Dec	Asahi–Shiratori (JPN)	2–0	Saulko–Zabuslayev (KAZ)	21–19	21–10	

==== Rank 5 ====
Date		Score		Set 1	Set 2	Set 3
09 Dec	Nishimura–Watanabe (JPN)	0–2	Ardiyansah–Darkuncoro (INA)	18–21	15–21	
09 Dec	Zhou–Li (CHN)	2–1	Asahi–Shiratori (JPN)	21–18	17–21	15–9

=== Knockout round ===
Semifinals
Wu–Xu (CHN)	21	14	15
Ardiyansah–Darkuncoro (INA)	10	21	10
Salim–Supriadi (INA)	23	21	13
Zhou–Li (CHN)	25	16	15

Final
Wu–Xu (CHN)	20	21	13
Zhou–Li (CHN)	22	12	15
Bronze medal match
Ardiyansah–Darkuncoro (INA)	23	18	13
Salim–Supriadi (INA)	21	21	15

== Final standing ==
Rank	Team	Pld	W	L
1st place, gold medalist(s)	Zhou Shun – Li Jian (CHN)	6	5	1
2nd place, silver medalist(s)	Wu Penggen – Xu Linyin (CHN)	5	4	1
3rd place, bronze medalist(s)	Agus Salim – Supriadi (INA)	6	5	1
4	Andy Ardiyansah – Koko Prasetyo Darkuncoro (INA)	7	4	3
5	Kentaro Asahi – Katsuhiro Shiratori (JPN)	5	3	2
5	Koichi Nishimura – Satoshi Watanabe (JPN)	4	2	2
7	Pavel Saulko – Pavel Zabuslayev (KAZ)	4	2	2
7	Dmitriy Vorobyev – Alexey Sidorenko (KAZ)	4	2	2
9	Som Chamnap – Koung Sopheap (CAM)	4	2	2
9	Pradeep John – Mohan Poothathan (IND)	4	2	2
9	Khalifa Al-Jabri – Badar Al-Subhi (OMA)	4	2	2
9	Dhammika Rohan Silva – Mahesh Perera (SRI)	5	3	2
13	Yunes Hasan Parwees – Hasan Aqeel Qarqoor (BRN)	4	2	2
13	Jameeluddin Mohammed – Shashidhar Tilkam (IND)	3	1	2
13	Parley Tupaz – Rhovyl Verayo (PHI)	4	2	2
13	Mohammed Anber – Mohammed Salem Al-Kuwari (QAT)	2	0	2
17	Osama Isa – Qader Abdulla (BRN)	3	1	2
17	Khoo Chong Long – Mohd Rafiq Latif (MAS)	3	1	2
17	Mohamed Nadeem – Waheed Fathuhulla (MDV)	2	0	2
17	Yaqoob Al-Maqbali – Ibrahim Al-Farsi (OMA)	3	1	2
17	Ayman Odeh – Rafi Asfour (PLE)	2	0	2
17	Saeed Al-Jamani – Ziad Benlouaer (QAT)	2	0	2
17	Döwletmyrat Hallyýew – Mämed Batyrow (TKM)	2	0	2
