= Gymnastics at the 2010 Asian Games – Men's pommel horse =

Men's pommel horse at the 2010 Asian Games
- Venue: Asian Games Town Gymnasium
- Date: 13–16 November 2010
- Competitors: 69 from 20 nations

Medalists
gold medal	Teng Haibin	China
silver medal	Yan Mingyong	China
bronze medal	Huang Che-kuei	Chinese Taipei

The men's pommel horse competition at the 2010 Asian Games in Guangzhou, China was held on 13 and 16 November 2010 at the Asian Games Town Gymnasium.

== Schedule ==
All times are China Standard Time (UTC+08:00)

Date	Time	Event
Saturday, 13 November 2010	09:30	Qualification
Tuesday, 16 November 2010	20:10	Final

== Results ==
=== Qualification ===
Rank	Athlete	Score
1	Teng Haibin (CHN)	15.550
2	Ryotaka Deguchi (JPN)	14.950
3	Huang Che-kuei (TPE)	14.600
4	Kim Hee-hoon (KOR)	14.550
5	Anton Fokin (UZB)	14.500
6	Kim Ji-hoon (KOR)	14.500
7	Yan Mingyong (CHN)	14.500
8	Zhang Chenglong (CHN)	14.450
9	Daulet Narmetov (UZB)	14.250
10	David-Jonathan Chan (SIN)	14.200
11	Hsu Ping-chien (TPE)	14.150
12	Thitipong Sukdee (THA)	14.150
13	Takuya Nakase (JPN)	14.050
14	Hisashi Mizutori (JPN)	14.000
15	Yernar Yerimbetov (KAZ)	13.850
16	Ildar Valeyev (KAZ)	13.750
17	Kim Soo-myun (KOR)	13.750
18	Chen Yibing (CHN)	13.700
19	Lü Bo (CHN)	13.650
20	Trương Minh Sang (VIE)	13.650
21	Maxim Petrishko (KAZ)	13.600
22	Sin Seob (KOR)	13.500
23	Eduard Shaulov (KAZ)	13.300
24	Mohammad Ramezanpour (IRI)	13.300
25	Phạm Phước Hưng (VIE)	13.200
26	Stanislav Valiyev (KAZ)	13.200
27	Stepan Gorbachev (KAZ)	13.050
28	Yoo Won-chul (KOR)	13.050
29	Vahid Izadfar (IRI)	13.000
30	Tu Yu-chen (TPE)	12.950
31	Ahmed Al-Dyani (QAT)	12.850
32	Woranad Kaewpanya (THA)	12.700
33	Hadi Khanarinejad (IRI)	12.700
34	Mayank Srivastava (SRI)	12.700
35	Kyoichi Watanabe (JPN)	12.600
36	Gabriel Gan (SIN)	12.550
37	Ivan Olushev (UZB)	12.500
38	Rakesh Kumar Patra (IND)	12.450
39	Lum Wan Foong (MAS)	12.350
40	Alok Ranjan (IND)	12.350
41	Weena Chokpaoumpai (THA)	12.300
42	Shek Wai Hung (HKG)	12.200
43	Ganbatyn Erdenebold (MGL)	12.200
44	Habib Al-Swailah (KSA)	12.100
45	Đặng Nam (VIE)	12.000
46	Otabek Masharipov (UZB)	11.950
47	Hoàng Cường (VIE)	11.800
48	Ashish Kumar (IND)	11.800
49	Lu Yan-ting (TPE)	11.600
50	Chen Chih-yu (TPE)	11.500
51	Rartchawat Kaewpanya (THA)	11.450
52	Amir Azami (IRI)	11.400
53	Ryosuke Baba (JPN)	11.250
54	Mahmood Al-Sadi (QAT)	11.200
55	Kittipong Yudee (THA)	11.100
56	Shinoj Muliyil (IND)	11.100
57	Ali Saadi (IRQ)	10.900
58	Nashwan Al-Harazi (YEM)	10.900
59	Tharindu Pathmaperuma (SRI)	10.700
60	Younes Zeighami (IRI)	10.650
61	Ng Kiu Chung (HKG)	10.100
62	Hầu Trung Linh (VIE)	9.750
63	Mohammed Sharif (YEM)	9.250
64	Abdulaziz Al-Johani (KSA)	9.150
65	Nadika Cooray (SRI)	8.900
66	Jasem Gazwi (KSA)	8.750
67	Ali Al-Khwaher (KSA)	6.000
68	Ismail Shabi (KSA)	5.050
69	Mohamad Ibrahim Shami (LIB)	2.850

=== Final ===
Rank	Athlete	Score
1st place, gold medalist(s)	Teng Haibin (CHN)	15.375
2nd place, silver medalist(s)	Yan Mingyong (CHN)	14.725
3rd place, bronze medalist(s)	Huang Che-kuei (TPE)	14.700
4	Ryotaka Deguchi (JPN)	14.500
5	Kim Hee-hoon (KOR)	13.775
6	Kim Ji-hoon (KOR)	13.550
7	Anton Fokin (UZB)	13.325
8	Daulet Narmetov (UZB)	13.075
