= Tamsin Hinchley =

Australian volleyball player

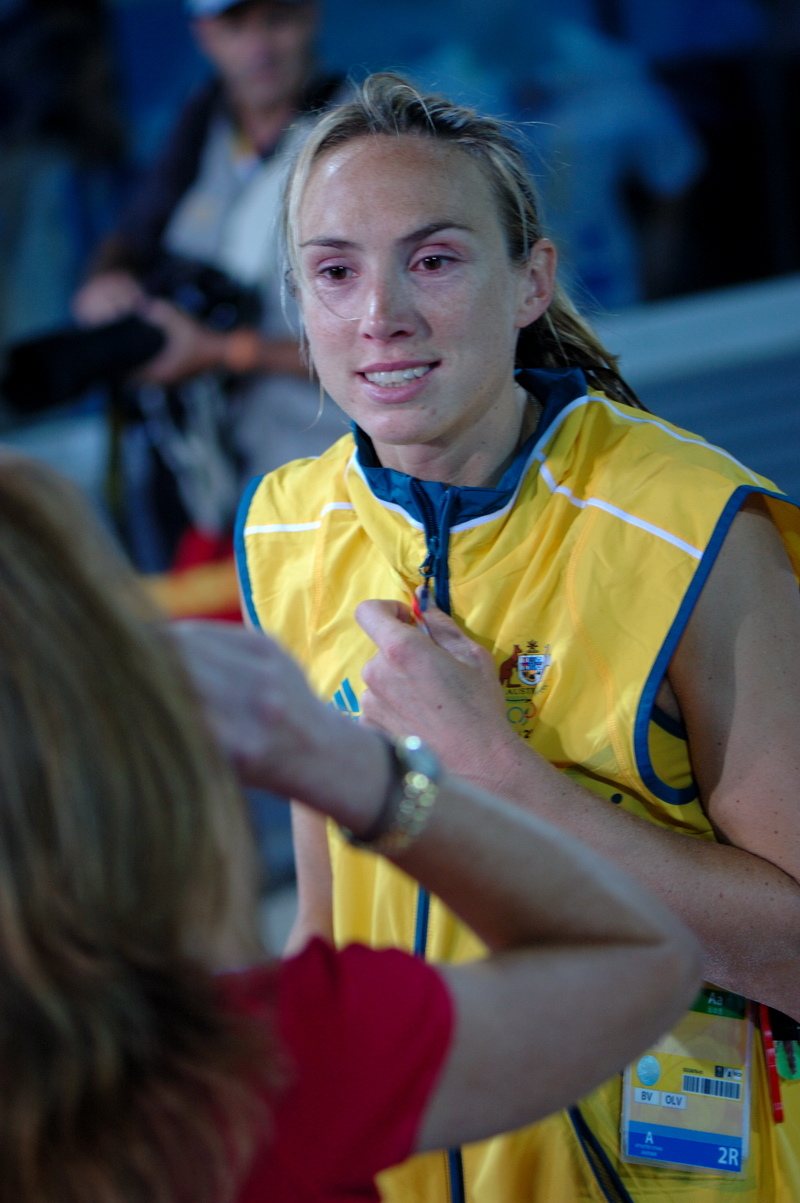
- Hinchley at the 2008 Summer Olympics

Personal information
- Nationality: Australian
- Born: Tamsin Barnett; 10 March 1980 (age 46); Adelaide, South Australia
- Height: 1.92 m (6 ft 4 in)
- Weight: 73 kg (161 lb)

Beach volleyball information
Teammate
Natalie Cook

National team
2000	Australia
Honours
Women's beach volleyball
Representing Australia
Asian Championships
Bronze medal – third place	2011 Haikou	Beach
- Last updated: 24 April 2023

Tamsin Hinchley (née Barnett, born 10 March 1980) is a retired Australian indoor and beach volleyball player. Born in Adelaide, Hinchley was on the Australian indoor squad at the 2000 Summer Olympics. At the 2008 and 2012 Summer Olympics, Hinchley partnered with Natalie Cook in beach volleyball where they finished 5th and 19th, respectively. Hinchley and Cook also partnered on the Swatch FIVB World Tour, and Hinchley was named the World Tour's most improved player in 2007.

== Personal life ==
Tamsin is married to Al Hinchley. They have three children, a son and two daughters.

Awards
Preceded by Leila Barros (BRA)	Women's FIVB World Tour "Most Improved" alongside (Germany) Laura Ludwig; 2007	Succeeded by Nicole Branagh (USA)
