= Natalie Cook =

Australian beach volleyball player

Natalie Cook OAM OLY
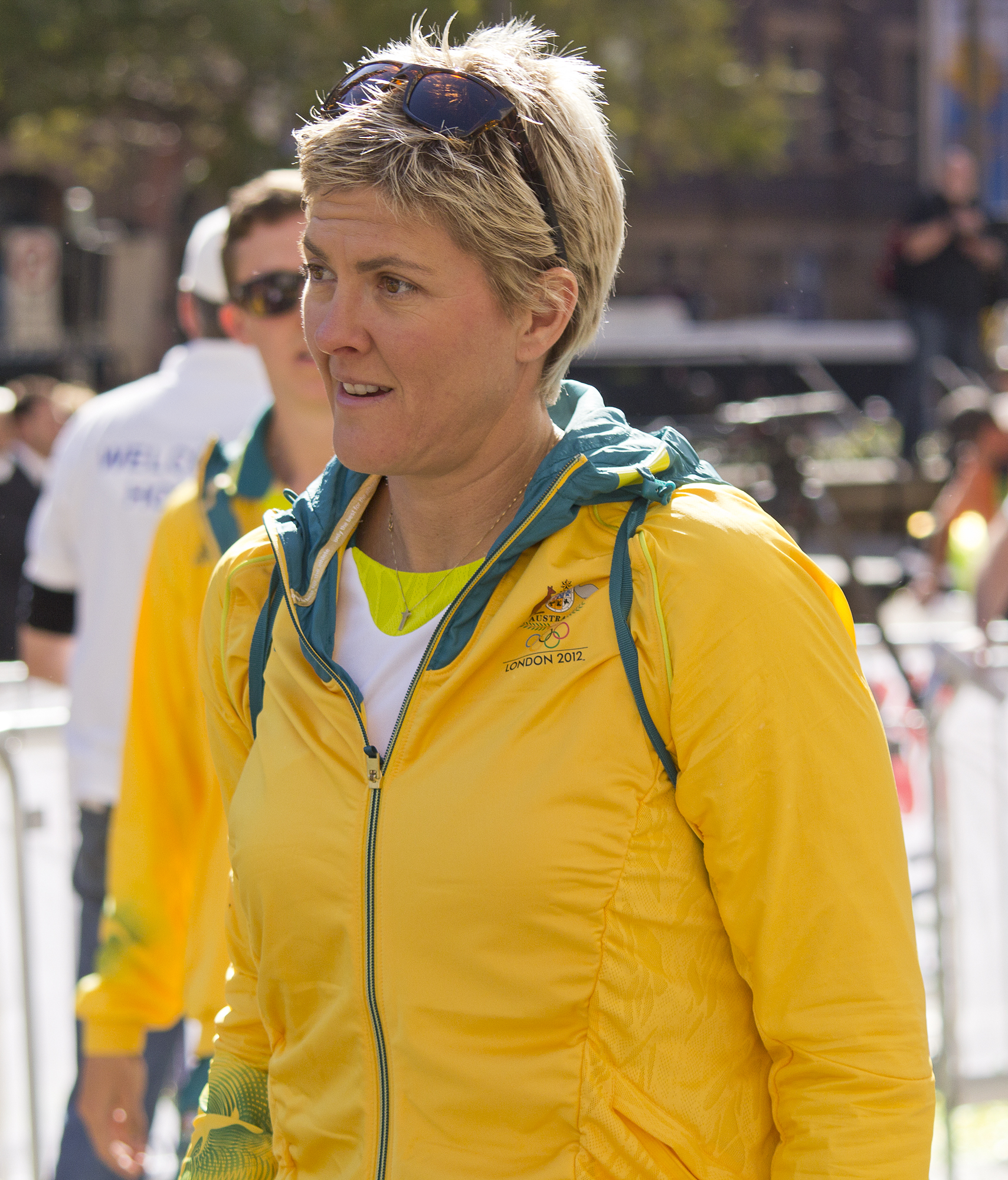

Personal information
- Full name: Natalie Louise Cook
- Born: 19 January 1975 (age 51) Townsville, Queensland, Australia
- Height: 181 cm (5 ft 11 in)
- Weight: 73 kg (161 lb)
Honours
Women's beach volleyball
Representing Australia
Olympic Games
| Gold medal – first place | 2000 Sydney | Beach |
| Bronze medal – third place | 1996 Atlanta | Beach |
World Championships
| Bronze medal – third place | 2003 Rio de Janeiro | Beach |
Asian Beach Volleyball Championships
| Bronze medal – third place | 2011 | Haikou |
- Updated on 4 June 2015

Natalie Louise Cook (born 19 January 1975) is an Australian professional beach volleyball player and Olympic gold medallist. She became the first Australian woman to compete at five Olympic Games.

== Early life ==
Cook was born in Townsville, Queensland. She was the dux of her school, Corinda State High (located in the western suburbs of Brisbane). She enrolled in pre-medicine college courses, and also took up volleyball, captaining the Australian Indoor Junior Team in 1992. In 1993 she began playing beach volleyball. In 1994 she went professional and gave up her pursuit of a medical degree.

== Career ==
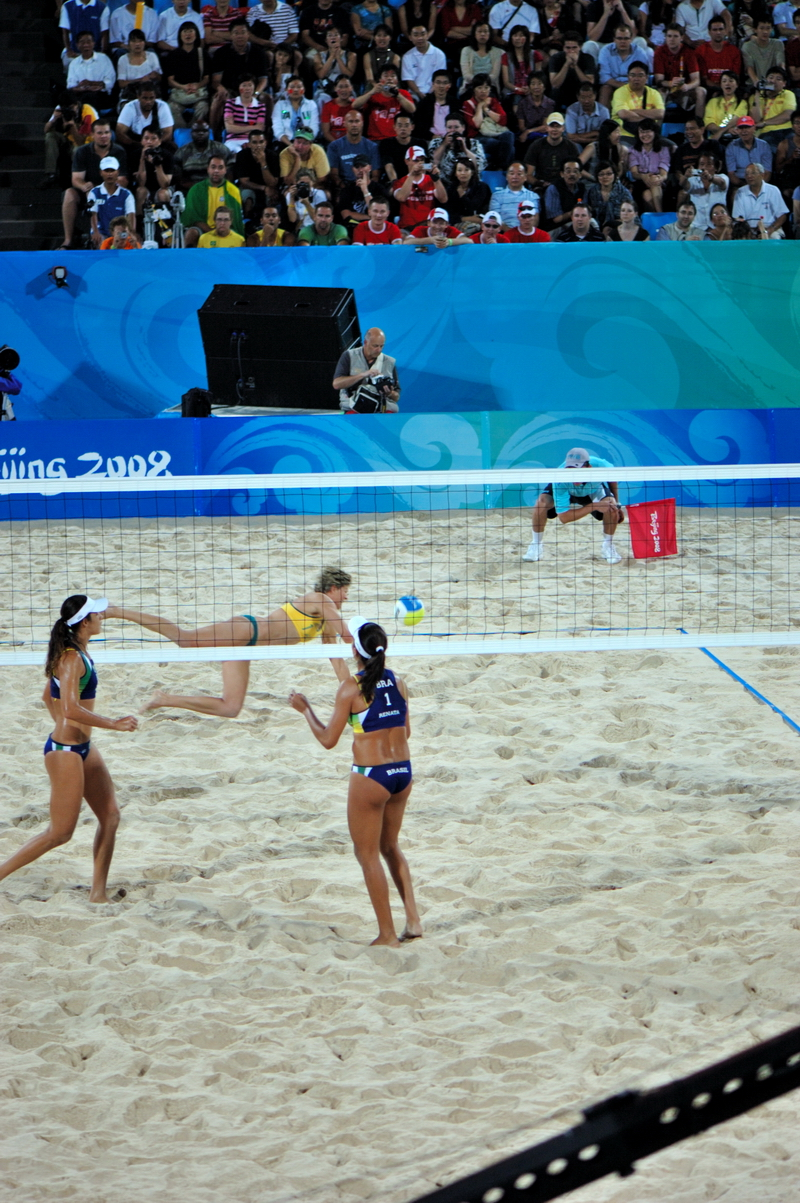
Cook (in yellow) in the 2008 Summer Olympics quarterfinals vs Brazil.

Cook partnered with Kerri Pottharst to represent Australia at the Atlanta Olympics in 1996, winning a bronze medal—the first time that beach volleyball had been an Olympic sport. In the same year, the pair won a silver medal at the world championships, and came first in the World Tour Event in Japan.

Cook and Pottharst did not play together again until 2000. They finished third in the World Tour Events, held in France and Portugal, and then participated in the 2000 Summer Olympics in Sydney. They dominated the competition, winning the gold medal. In the aftermath of their Olympic win, the pair were awarded the Medal of the Order of Australia. Cook and Pottharst were included in the Fédération Internationale de Volleyball's Team of the Decade. After the Olympics, Pottharst retired, and Cook found a new partner in Nicole Sanderson. They won a bronze medal at the 2003 Beach Volleyball World Championships in Rio de Janeiro, and by the end of the 2003 world tour, were ranked fourth in the world. They were subsequently selected to represent Australia at the 2004 Athens Olympics. After a promising start, they finished out of medal contention, losing to teams from Brazil and the United States. For the 2008 Summer Olympics, Cook partnered with Tamsin Barnett, finishing fifth overall. On 1 August 2012, Cook's record breaking beach volleyball career came to an end with her elimination from her fifth games in London.

== Recognition ==
In January 2001, Cook was awarded the Australian Sports Medal.

Cook was also awarded the Medal of the Order of Australia in the 2001 Australia Day Honours in recognition of her service to sport as a gold medallist at the Sydney 2000 Olympic Games.

In 2024, Cook was named as a Queensland Great.

== Personal life ==
Cook currently resides in Brisbane and is married to fellow beach volleyballer Sarah Maxwell. In addition to her sporting career, Cook tours on the public speaking circuit as a leading motivational speaker attracting big audiences and launched her own beach volleyball-related business, Sandstorm at the QEII Stadium in Brisbane.

== Books ==
- Go Girl! (2001)
- Health & Wellbeing Millionaire
