= Yemen at the 2010 Asian Games =

- IOC code: YEM
- NOC: Yemen Olympic Association
- Website: www.nocyemen.org (in Arabic and English)

in Guangzhou
- Competitors: 32 in 6 sports
- Flag bearers: Opening: Closing:
- Medals: Gold 0 Silver 0 Bronze 0 Total 0

Asian Games appearances (overview)
- 1990; 1994; 1998; 2002; 2006; 2010; 2014; 2018; 2022; 2026

Other related appearances
- North Yemen (1982, 1986); South Yemen (1982)

Yemen participated in the 2010 Asian Games in Guangzhou, China between 12–27 November 2010. The contingent was led by They finished the games with no medals.

== Athletics ==
=== Track and Field ===
Athlete	Event	Heats		Semifinals		Final	
Athlete	Event	Result	Rank	Result	Rank	Result	Rank
Geabel Al-Muradi	Men's 800 m	1:53.27	16	N/A		Did not advance	
Waleed Saleh Elayah	Men's 1500 m	3:56.72	16	N/A		Did not advance	
Waleed Saleh Elayah	Men's 3000 m steeplechase	N/A				Did not run	
Nabil Mohamed Al-Garbi	Men's 3000 m steeplechase	N/A				9:16.80	11
Fatima Dahman	Women's 400 m	Did not participate					
Suzana Zukhairi	Women's 400 m	1:07.98	15	Did not advance			
Suzana Zukhairi	Women's 800m	Did not run		N/A		Did not advance	
Fatima Dahman	Women's 400 m hurdles	Did not run		N/A		Did not advance	

== Beach Volleyball ==
Athlete	Event	Preliminary		Round of 16	Quarterfinals	Semifinals	Final / BM	
Athlete	Event	Oppositions Scores	Rank	Opposition Score	Opposition Score	Opposition Score	Opposition Score	Rank
Aiman Al-KatheriAshraf Omair	Men's tournament	Wu / Xu (CHN): L 0–2 Kumara / Ekanayaka (SRI): L 0–2	3	Did not advance				
Adeeb MahfoudhAssar Mohammed	Men's tournament	Ardiyansah / Darkuncoro (INA): L 0–2 Inoue / Hasegawa (JPN): L 1–2	3	Did not advance				

== Artistic Gymnastics ==
=== Men's artistic individual all-around ===
Rank	Athlete	Floor (gymnastics)	Pommel horse	Rings (gymnastics)	Vault (gymnastics)	Parallel bars	Horizontal bar	Total
63	Mohammed Sharif (YEM)	12.400	9.250		15.200	12.550		49.400
72	Nashwan Al-Harazi (YEM)	14.200	10.900		15.600			40.700

== Judo ==
Athlete	Event	Preliminary	Round of 16	Quarterfinals	Final of table	Final of repechage	Final	
Athlete	Event	Opposition Result	Opposition Result	Opposition Result	Opposition Result	Opposition Result	Opposition Result	Rank
Ali Khousrof	−60 kg	Bye	Did not advance					
Waleed Al Kabzari	−66 kg	Hong (PRK)L 000–100	Did not advance					

== Taekwondo ==
Athlete	Event	Round of 32	Round of 16	Quarterfinals	Semifinals	Final
Athlete	Event	Opposition Result	Opposition Result	Opposition Result	Opposition Result	Opposition Result
Muaadh Abadl	Bantamweight (−63 kg)	Bye	Lee (KOR)L	Did not advance		
Al Qadasi Abdullah	Lightweight (−74 kg)	Bye	Karimov (TJK)L	Did not advance		
Tameem Al-Kubati	Finweight (−54 kg)	Bye	Japoy (PHI)L	Did not advance		
Yaser Ba-Matraf	Flyweight (−58 kg)	Outhasak (LAO)W	Pulato (UZB)L	Did not advance		
