= Kim Hak-man =

South Korean sport shooter

Kim Hak-Man (Korean: 김학만; born 26 March 1976 in South Chungcheong Province) is a South Korean rifle shooter. He competed in the 50 m rifle prone event at the 2012 Summer Olympics, where he placed 15th. He finished in 28th place in the same event at the 2008 Summer Olympics.
