= Kentaro Asahi =

Japanese beach volleyball player and politician

Kentaro Asahi OLY
- 朝日 健太郎
- Official portrait, 2021

Senator of Japan
- Incumbent
- Assumed office 26 July 2016
- Preceded by: Kota Matsuda
- Constituency: Tokyo at-large

Personal details
- Born: 19 September 1975 (age 51) Kita-ku, Kumamoto, Japan
- Party: Liberal Democratic
- Education: Hosei University; Waseda University
- Volleyball career
- Height: 1.99 m (6 ft 6 in)
- Weight: 83 kg (183 lb)
Beach volleyball information
Current teammate
Years	Teammate	
–	Katsuhiro Shiratori	
Previous teammates
Years	Teammate	Tours (points)
–	Koichi Nishimura; Satoshi Watanabe	25 (295); 24 (605)
Medal record
Men's beach volleyball
Representing Japan
Asian Games
Bronze medal – third place	2010 Guangzhou	Men

Kentaro Asahi (朝日健太郎, Asahi Kentarō; born 19 September 1975) is a Japanese professional beach volleyball player and politician. He was born in Kumamoto, Kumamoto Prefecture, Kyushu, Japan.

Asahi played as a center for the Japan men's national volleyball team in the 1990s. He ended up in sixteenth place at the 1998 World Championship, and later on started a career in beach volleyball. Asahi and teammate Katsuhiro Shiratori represented Japan in beach volleyball at the 2008 and 2012 Summer Olympics.

Asahi began to work for the IT company Forval Corporation in 2011 through a Japanese Olympic Committee athlete hiring program.

In July 2016, Asahi was elected as a member of the House of Councillors representing the Tokyo at-large district for the Liberal Democratic Party.

== Honours ==
- 1998 World Championship — 16th place
