= Aghmohammad Salagh =

Iranian beach volleyball player

Honours
Men's beach volleyball
Representing Iran
Asian Championship
| Gold medal – first place | 2011 Haikou | Beach |

Aghmohammad Salagh is an Iranian male beach volleyball player. He competed at the 2012 Asian Beach Games in Haiyang, China. He is the 2011 Asian Champion with his teammate, Parviz Farrokhi.
