= Parviz Farrokhi =

Iranian beach volleyball player

Personal information
- Born: September 10, 1968 (age 58)
Honours
Men's beach volleyball
Representing Iran
Asian Championship
Gold medal – first place	2011 Haikou	Beach

Parviz Farrokhi (born September 10,1968) is an Iranian male beach volleyball player. He competed at the 2012 Asian Beach Games in Haiyang, China. He is 2011 Asian Champion with his teammate Aghmohammad Salagh.
