= Koichi Nishimura =

Japanese beach volleyball player (born 1973)

Koichi "Nishi" Nishimura (born 30 June 1973) is a beach volleyball player from Japan. He was born in Kyoto. Nishimura began his career as an indoor volleyball player and played Libero for the Japanese National Team. In 2002 Nishimura switched to beach volleyball. He currently plays in the "Winds" beach volleyball team. In 2009, Nishimura founded the environmental non-profit-organisation "Save the Beach".

They were the fourth ranked team at the 2006 Asian Games but were eliminated in the fourth round.

He married volleyball player Kaoru Sugayama in 2011.

== Career and awards ==
- 1998 – World Championships- Awarded "Best Digger"
- 1999 Asian Championships – 4th place
- Asian Championships – 4th place- Awarded "Best Digger"
- 1999 – World Cup
- 2000 Olympics (Sydney), Asian Preliminary Round - 2nd place

Japan All Stars Awards'

- 1999 All Star – Fan voting – 1st place
- 2000 All Star – Fan voting – 2nd place
- 2001 All Star – Fan voting – 2nd place

In 2002 he switched from indoor volleyball to beach volleyball.

- 2003 Beach Volleyball Japan - Runner-up
- 2004 JBV Tour, Tokyo - Champion
- 2005 Beach Volleyball Japan - Champion

At the 2006 Swatch FIVB World Tour, in France, he won the 7th place and accomplished the unprecedented feat of becoming the first Japanese man to reach 7th place in a beach volleyball world tour tournament. The Japanese team was awarded the "Most Improved Team" title.

- 2008 JVB Tour, Tokyo - Champion
