= Wu Penggen =

Chinese beach volleyball player (born 1982)

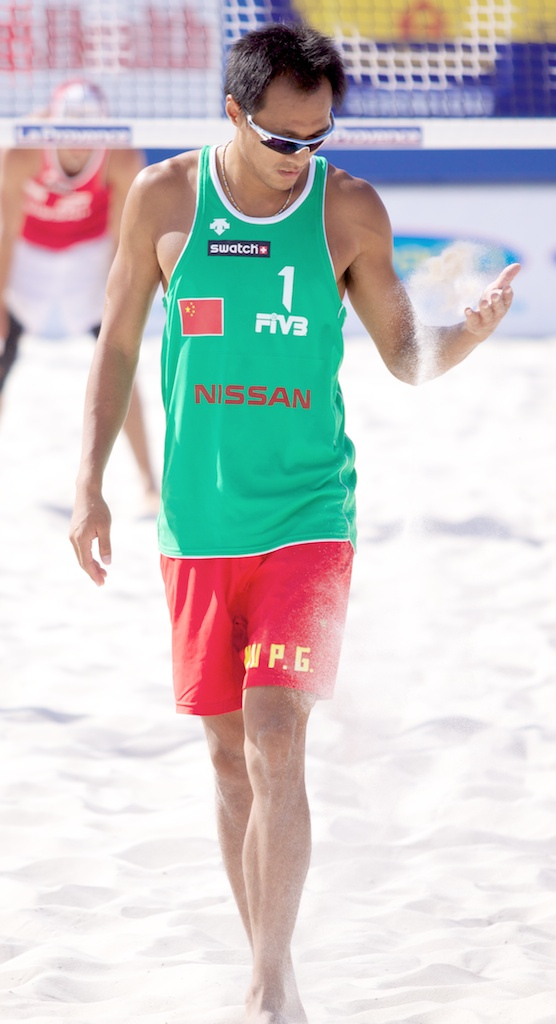
- Wu Penggen at the FIVB World Tour 2010

Medal record

Men's beach volleyball

Representing China

Asian Games
Gold medal – first place	2010 Guangzhou	Men
Silver medal – second place	2006 Doha	Men

Wu Penggen (Simplified Chinese:吴 鹏根, born 7 May 1982) is a male Chinese professional beach volleyball player.

== Career ==
He and partner Xu Linyin competed in the beach volleyball event at the 2008 Summer Olympics where they finished a respectable 5th place overall.

On 14 June 2010, Wu Penggen and Xu Linyin bested the Olympic Champions from USA Todd Rogers and Phil Dalhausser 21–17, 17-21 and 17–15 to win the Gold at the FIVB World Tour title in Moscow, Russia. This was the first time China won the title in the men's event in the 24-year history of the international Beach Volleyball circuit.

The duo of Wu and Xu continued their extraordinary performance with a second Gold on the FIVB World Tour in Marseille, France on 25 July 2010, and ended the season ranked 4th overall on the FIVB Beach Volleyball World Rankings.

== See also ==
- China at the 2012 Summer Olympics § Volleyball
- Beach volleyball at the 2012 Summer Olympics – Men's tournament
- China at the 2008 Summer Olympics
