= Timor-Leste at the 2010 Asian Games =

- IOC code: TLS
- NOC: National Olympic Committee of Timor Leste

in Guangzhou
- Competitors: 29

Asian Games appearances (overview)
- 2002; 2006; 2010; 2014; 2018; 2022; 2026

Timor-Leste participated in the 2010 Asian Games in Guangzhou from 12 November to 27 November 2010. They will participate in athletics, beach volleyball, boxing, cycling, karate, taekwondo, table tennis, and weightlifting. The contingent comprises 29 athletes, 21 men and 8 women.

== Beach Volleyball ==
Both men's and a women's teams were sent.

=== Women ===
==== Group B ====
Pos	Team	Pld	W	L	Pts	SPW	SPL	SPR	SW	SL	SR	Qualification
1	Huang–Yue (CHN)	3	2	1	5 (Note: Head-to-head set points ratio: CHN 1.095, JPN 1.027, MAS 0.891. JPN and MAS were ranked by their head-to-head result: JPN 2–0 MAS.)	134	91	1.473	5	2	2.500	Round of 16
2	Tanaka–Mizoe (JPN)	3	2	1	5	117	90	1.300	4	2	2.000	Round of 16
3	Luk–Beh (MAS)	3	2	1	5	124	104	1.192	4	3	1.333	Round of 16
4	Xavier–dos Santos (TLS)	3	0	3	3	36	126	0.286	0	6	0.000	Round of 16

Source: Results
Notes:

Date		Score		Set 1	Set 2	Set 3
15 Nov	Tanaka–Mizoe (JPN)	2–0	Xavier–dos Santos (TLS)	21–7	21–10	
17 Nov	Huang–Yue (CHN)	2–0	Xavier–dos Santos (TLS)	21–2	21–5	
19 Nov	Luk–Beh (MAS)	2–0	Xavier–dos Santos (TLS)	21–5	21–7	
