= Xu Linyin =

Chinese beach volleyball player (born 1986)

Personal information
- Full name: Xu Linyin
- Nickname: Giant
- Born: 20 March 1986 (age 40) Shanghai, China
- Home town: Hebei, China
- Height: 200 cm (6 ft 7 in)
Beach volleyball information
Current teammate
Years	Teammate	
–	Penggen Wu	
Previous teammates
Years	Teammate	Tours (points)
–	Qiang Xu	20 (488)
Medal record
Men's beach volleyball
Representing China
Asian Games
Gold medal – first place	2010 Guangzhou	Men
Silver medal – second place	2006 Doha	Men

Xu Linyin (Simplified Chinese:徐 林胤, born 20 March 1986 in Shanghai) is a Chinese professional beach volleyball player.

== Career ==
Nicknamed "Giant" because of his height, Xu Linyin stands 6 feet 7 inches tall. He headed into the 2008 Olympics as the #1 seed with his teammate Penggen Wu. They placed 5th in the FIVB Beach Volleyball Olympic Ranking, but were #1 seed because of FIVB regulations. Unfortunately they lost to the German pair of David Klemperer and Eric Koreng in the last 16.

On 14 June 2010, Xu Linyin and partner Wu Penggen bested the Olympic Champions from USA Todd Rogers and Phil Dalhausser 21–17, 17-21 and 17–15 to win the Gold at the FIVB World Tour in Moscow. This was the first time China won the title in the men's event in the 24-year history of the international Beach Volleyball circuit.

The duo of Xu and Wu continued their extraordinary performance with a second Gold on the FIVB World Tour in Marseille, France on 25 July 2010, and ended the season ranked 4th overall on the FIVB Beach Volleyball World Rankings.

At the 2012 Olympics, he and Wu did not qualify out of the pool stages.

== See also ==
- China at the 2012 Summer Olympics#Volleyball
- Beach volleyball at the 2012 Summer Olympics – Men's tournament

Awards
Preceded by Phil Dalhausser (USA)	Men's FIVB Beach World Tour "Most Improved"; 2007	Succeeded by Andy Cès (FRA)
Preceded by Harley Marques (BRA)	Men's FIVB Beach World Tour "Most Inspirational"; 2010	Succeeded by Emanuel Rego (BRA)
