= Katsuhiro Shiratori =

Japanese beach volleyball player (born 1976)

Katsuhiro Shiratori OLY
Personal information
- Nationality: Japanese
- Born: October 29, 1976 (age 49) Ota-ku, Tokyo, Japan
- Height: 1.90 m (6 ft 3 in)
- Weight: 88 kg (194 lb)

Sport
- Country: Japan
- Sport: Beach Volleyball
Medal record
Men's beach volleyball
Representing Japan
Asian Games
Gold medal – first place	2002 Busan	Men
Bronze medal – third place	2010 Guangzhou	Men
- Updated on 30 July 2012

Katsuhiro Shiratori (白鳥 勝浩, Shiratori Katsuhiro) (born October 29, 1976) is a beach volleyball player from Japan.

He represented Japan at the 2008 Summer Olympics and 2012 Summer Olympics with teammate Kentaro Asahi. He also participated in the 2020 Summer Olympics.
