= Oman at the 2010 Asian Games =

- IOC code: OMA
- NOC: Oman Olympic Committee

in Guangzhou
- Competitors: 75
- Medals Ranked 34th: Gold 0 Silver 0 Bronze 1 Total 1

Asian Games appearances (overview)
- 1982; 1986; 1990; 1994; 1998; 2002; 2006; 2010; 2014; 2018; 2022; 2026

Oman participated in the 16th Asian Games in Guangzhou, China from 12 to 27 November 2010. Its contingent comprised 95 members, including 75 athletes. It will take part in six disciplines namely athletics, football, field hockey, shooting, tennis, and beach volleyball.

== Medalists ==
Medal	Name	Sport	Event	Date
Bronze	Barakat Al Harthi	Athletics	Men's 100m	22 November

== Football ==
Oman was in Group F with Pakistan, Thailand and Maldives.

=== Group F ===
Pos	Team	Pld	W	D	L	GF	GA	GD	Pts
1	Oman	3	2	1	0	6	1	+5	7
2	Thailand	3	1	2	0	7	1	+6	5
3	Maldives	3	0	2	1	0	3	−3	2
4	Pakistan	3	0	1	2	0	8	−8	1

Source: RSSSF
11 November
19:00

Oman	2–0	Pakistan
Al-Gheilani 10'; Al-Saadi 65'	Report

Guangdong People's Stadium, Guangzhou
Referee: Vo Minh Tri (Vietnam)

== Field hockey ==
Oman is placed in Group A along with Malaysia, South Korea, China and Singapore.

=== Team ===
- Abduljabbar al Balushi (goalkeeper)
- Asim Dawood al Hasni (goalkeeper)
- Hussain Abdullah al Hasni,
- Mohammed Hubeis al Shar,
- Basim Khatir Rajab Said,
- Sameer Huleis al Shibli,
- Younis Ghabish al Nofli
- Hussain Ali Mubarak
- Salah Nasser al Saadi
- Ikram Juman Ramadhan
- Shakir Awadh Said
- Hashim Ghanim al Shatri
- Waleed Abdullah al Hasani
- Yousuf Khalfan al Riyami
- Marwan Abdulrahman
- Murshid Rabe’ea Said Huwait
