= Sri Lanka at the 2010 Asian Games =

- IOC code: SRI
- NOC: National Olympic Committee of Sri Lanka

in Guangzhou
- Competitors: 104 in 24 sports
- Flag bearer: Mithun Perera
- Medals: Gold 0 Silver 0 Bronze 0 Total 0

Asian Games appearances (overview)
- 1951; 1954; 1958; 1962; 1966; 1970; 1974; 1978; 1982; 1986; 1990; 1994; 1998; 2002; 2006; 2010; 2014; 2018; 2022; 2026

Sri Lanka participated in the 16th Asian Games, held in Guangzhou, China, from 12 to 27 November.

== Archery ==
Sri Lanka sent 5 archers for the multi-sport event including 3 men and 2 women archers.

Men

- Indranath Perera
- Chaminda Rajasinghe
- Nipun Seneviratne

Women

- Dilhara Salgado
- Shashikala Kumarasinghe

== Athletics ==
Sri Lanka sent 21 athletes for the competition.

Men

- Manjula Kumara
- Chaminda Wijekoon
- Prasanna Amarasekara
- KK Seneviratne
- Nalin Priyantha
- Keith de Mel
- DN Karunaratne
- Uditha Wickramasinghe
- Rohitha Pushpakumara
- Gihan Ratnayake
- Shivantha Weerasuriya
- Ashan Hasaranga

Women

- Jani Chathurangani
- Nadeeka Lakmali
- Chamli Priyadarshani
- Chandrika Rasnayake
- Niluka Nadeeshani
- Niranjani Abeywickrema
- Sujani Buddhika

== Badminton ==
Sri Lanka sent 4 badminton athletes including 2 men and a woman for the event.

Men

- Niluka Karunaratne
- Dinuka Karunaratne

Women

- Thilini Jayasinghe

== Beach Volleyball ==
Sri Lanka sent the men's and women's beach volleyball teams.

Men

- Asanka Pradeep & Pubudu Ekanayake
- Mahesh Perera & Wasantha Ratnapala

Women

- Sujeewa Withanange & Nirosha Gunasinghe
- LS Somaratne & HN Lakmini

== Boxing ==
Sri Lanka was scheduled to send 7 boxers (6 men and 1 women) to the Games, but 3 men boxers withdrew from the competition. The 2010 Commonwealth Games gold medalist Manju Wanniarachchi also withdrew due to injury.

Men

- Chaminda Tennakoon
- Saman Priyadharshana Silva
- PD Suresh

Women

- Niranjala Senanayake

== Cricket ==
Sri Lanka men's cricket team was eligible to participate in the competition as it was the first instance that cricket was included in an Asian Games event.

Despite the absence of main cricketing nation, India, Sri Lankan team was ranked at 4th place and couldn't able to receive any medal at the cricket competition.

Roster

- Jehan Mubarak
- Jeevantha Kulatunga
- Kaushalya Weeraratne
- Chinthaka Jayasinghe
- Indika de Saram
- Nuwan Zoysa
- Dilhara Lokuhettige
- Kaushal Lokuarachchi
- Dilshan Munaweera
- T.M. Sampath
- Kusal Perera
- Isuru Udana
- Sajeewa Weerakoon
- Gayan Wijekoon
- Malinga Bandara

== Cycling ==
Sri Lanka sent 2 cyclists for the event.

=== Road ===
Men

- Lakshman Wijeratne

Women

- Lasanthi Gunathilaka

== Golf ==
Sri Lanka sent 4 golfers, all men.

- Mithun Perera
- T Nadaraja
- VB Ranaratna
- KA Chandradasa

== Gymnastics ==
Sri Lanka sent 2 male gymnasts.

=== Artistic ===
Men

- Nadika Cooray
- Tharindu Pathmaperuma

== Kabaddi ==
Women

- Team

However, according to the official Olympic Committee website, Kabaddi was not listed as a sport being competed by Sri Lanka.

== Karate ==
Sri Lanka sent one male karate athlete.

Men

RJ Edward

== Rowing ==
Sri Lanka sent only 2 rowers for the Asian Games.

Men

- Rajeev De Silva- Single and Double Sculls
- Guyan Jayaratne- Double Sculls

== Rugby sevens ==
Sri Lanka's men's team consisted of 12 players.

== Sailing ==
Sri Lanka sent 4 sailors for the Asian Games including 3 male sailors and a woman sailor.

Men

- DA de Alwis
- Janaka Pathirage
- CL Gunawardena

Women

- Sureni Alapatha

== Shooting ==
Sri Lanka sent 4 male shooters.

Men

- Edirisinghe Senanayake
- Sarath Chandrasiri
- Mangala Samarakoon
- Yamith Krishantha

== Squash ==
Sri Lanka sent a delegation consisting of men's squash team.

Men

- Navin Samarasinghe
- Gihan Suwaris
- Binura Jayasuriya

== Swimming ==
Sri Lanka sent 2 swimmers for the multi-sporting event.

Men

- Heshan Unamboowe

Women

- Madhawee Weerathunga

== Synchronized swimming ==
- Elisha Gomes
- Dehara Katipearachchi

== Taekwondo ==
Sri Lanka sent 2 competitors for taekwondo.

Men

- Ravindra Rajapaksa
- Gayan Kumara

== Table tennis ==
Sri Lanka sent 2 paddlers.

Men

- Rohan Sirisena

Women

- Ishara Madurangi

== Tennis ==
Sri Lanka sent 3 male tennis players.

Men

- Harshana Godamanna
- Thangarajah Dineshkanthan
- Vimukthi de Alwis

== Weightlifting ==
Sri Lanka sent 2 male weightlifters as a part of the 2010 Asian Games. However the team will not include Suresh Peris or Chintana Vindange medal winners at the 2010 Commonwealth games.

Men

- Priyantha Wijesuriya
- Chaturanga Dissananyake

== Wushu ==
Sri Lanka sent only one wushu competitor for the event.

Men

- ID Abeyratne
