= Iran at the 2010 Asian Games =

- IOC code: IRI
- NOC: National Olympic Committee of the Islamic Republic of Iran

in Guangzhou
- Competitors: 359 in 27 sports
- Flag bearer: Samad Nikkhah Bahrami
- Medals Ranked 4th: Gold 20 Silver 15 Bronze 24 Total 59

Asian Games appearances (overview)
- 1951; 1954; 1958; 1962; 1966; 1970; 1974; 1978; 1982; 1986; 1990; 1994; 1998; 2002; 2006; 2010; 2014; 2018; 2022; 2026

Iran participated in the 2010 Asian Games in Guangzhou, China on 12–27 November 2010.

== Competitors ==
Sport	Men	Women	Total
Archery	4	4	8
Athletics	14	4	18
Basketball	12		12
Beach volleyball	4		4
Boxing	9		9
Canoe slalom	3		3
Canoe sprint	7	3	10
Chess	5	5	10
Cue sports	3		3
Cycling	11		11
Diving	4		4
Dragon boat	24	24	48
Fencing	11		11
Football	20		20
Gymnastics artistic	6		6
Handball	16		16
Judo	7	3	10
Kabaddi	12	12	24
Karate	4	4	8
Roller speed skating	1	1	2
Rowing	19	6	25
Sailing	6	3	9
Shooting	13	11	24
Swimming	6		6
Table tennis	3		3
Taekwondo	6	6	12
Volleyball	12		12
Weightlifting	8		8
Wrestling	14		14
Wushu	7	2	9
Total	271	88	359

== Medals by sport ==
=== Medal table ===
Sport	Gold	Silver	Bronze	Total
Athletics	2	3		5
Basketball			1	1
Boxing			3	3
Canoe sprint	1	1	1	3
Cycling road			1	1
Cycling track			2	2
Handball		1		1
Judo		1	1	2
Kabaddi		1	1	2
Karate	2		2	4
Rowing	1		1	2
Shooting		2	1	3
Taekwondo	3	2	4	9
Volleyball		1		1
Weightlifting	1	2	1	4
Wrestling	7	1	2	10
Wushu	3		3	6
Total	20	15	24	59

=== Medalists ===
Medal	Name	Sport	Event
Gold	Sajjad Moradi	Athletics	Men's 800 m
Gold	Ehsan Haddadi	Athletics	Men's discus throw
Gold	Ahmad Reza Talebian	Canoe sprint	Men's K1 1000 m
Gold	Jasem Vishkaei	Karate	Men's kumite 84 kg
Gold	Zabihollah Pourshab	Karate	Men's kumite +84 kg
Gold	Mohsen Shadi	Rowing	Men's lightweight single sculls
Gold	Mohammad Bagheri Motamed	Taekwondo	Men's 68 kg
Gold	Alireza Nasr Azadani	Taekwondo	Men's 74 kg
Gold	Yousef Karami	Taekwondo	Men's 87 kg
Gold	Behdad Salimi	Weightlifting	Men's +105 kg
Gold	Sadegh Goudarzi	Wrestling	Men's freestyle 74 kg
Gold	Jamal Mirzaei	Wrestling	Men's freestyle 84 kg
Gold	Reza Yazdani	Wrestling	Men's freestyle 96 kg
Gold	Omid Norouzi	Wrestling	Men's Greco-Roman 60 kg
Gold	Saeid Abdevali	Wrestling	Men's Greco-Roman 66 kg
Gold	Taleb Nematpour	Wrestling	Men's Greco-Roman 84 kg
Gold	Babak Ghorbani	Wrestling	Men's Greco-Roman 96 kg
Gold	Mohsen Mohammadseifi	Wushu	Men's sanshou 60 kg
Gold	Hamid Reza Gholipour	Wushu	Men's sanshou 75 kg
Gold	Khadijeh Azadpour	Wushu	Women's sanshou 60 kg
Silver	Sajjad Moradi	Athletics	Men's 1500 m
Silver	Mohammad Samimi	Athletics	Men's discus throw
Silver	Kaveh Mousavi	Athletics	Men's hammer throw
Silver	Shahoo Nasseri	Canoe sprint	Men's C1 1000 m
Silver	Abbas Asadzadeh; Milad Masaeli; Mohammad Reza Rajabi; Ehsan Abouei; Omid Sekenari; Sajjad Esteki; Masoud Zohrabi; Mostafa Sadati; Allahkaram Esteki; Javad Khorramipour; Erfan Saeidi; Mehrdad Samsami; Jalal Kiani; Saeid Barkhordari; Mohammad Mehdi Asgari; Mehdi Bijari	Handball	Men
Silver	Mohammad Reza Roudaki	Judo	Men's openweight
Silver	Reza Kamali Moghaddam; Morteza Shahidi; Nasser Roumiani; Fazel Atrachali; Meisam Abbasi; Mehdi Mousavi; Siamak Rezagholi; Abouzar Mohajer; Mehdi Safaeian; Kianoush Naderian; Ebad Dalili; Mostafa Nodehi	Kabaddi	Men
Silver	Elaheh Ahmadi; Narjes Emamgholinejad; Mahlagha Jambozorg	Shooting	Women's 10 m air rifle team
Silver	Elaheh Ahmadi	Shooting	Women's 50 m rifle 3 positions
Silver	Raheleh Asemani	Taekwondo	Women's 62 kg
Silver	Parisa Farshidi	Taekwondo	Women's 67 kg
Silver	Adel Gholami; Mojtaba Attar; Saeid Marouf; Mohammad Mousavi; Hamzeh Zarini; Alireza Nadi; Mohsen Andalib; Farhad Nazari Afshar; Mehdi Mahdavi; Arash Keshavarzi; Mohammad Mohammadkazem; Arash Kamalvand	Volleyball	Men
Silver	Morteza Rezaeian	Weightlifting	Men's 69 kg
Silver	Asghar Ebrahimi	Weightlifting	Men's 94 kg
Silver	Mehdi Taghavi	Wrestling	Men's freestyle 66 kg
Bronze	Amir Amini; Aren Davoudi; Javad Davari; Mehdi Kamrani; Saeid Davarpanah; Oshin Sahakian; Hamed Afagh; Hamed Sohrabnejad; Ali Jamshidi; Asghar Kardoust; Samad Nikkhah Bahrami; Ali Doraghi	Basketball	Men
Bronze	Mohammad Sattarpour	Boxing	Men's 75 kg
Bronze	Ali Mazaheri	Boxing	Men's 91 kg
Bronze	Rouhollah Hosseini	Boxing	Men's +91 kg
Bronze	Hossein Sinkaei; Ahmad Reza Talebian; Farzin Asadi; Amin Boudaghi	Canoe sprint	Men's K4 1000 m
Bronze	Hossein Askari	Cycling road	Men's individual time trial
Bronze	Mehdi Sohrabi	Cycling track	Men's points race
Bronze	Farshid Farsinejadian; Mahmoud Parash; Hassan Ali Varposhti	Cycling track	Men's team sprint
Bronze	Mohammad Reza Roudaki	Judo	Men's +100 kg
Bronze	Soheila Solbi; Fatemeh Momeni; Saeideh Maghsoudloo; Maliheh Miri; Shilan Sharezouli; Ghazal Khalaj; Farideh Zarifdoust; Zahra Masoumabadi; Samira Shabani; Salimeh Abdollahbakhsh; Marzieh Eshghi; Sedigheh Jafari	Kabaddi	Women
Bronze	Fatemeh Chalaki	Karate	Women's kumite 55 kg
Bronze	Samira Malekipour	Karate	Women's kumite 68 kg
Bronze	Nasim Benyaghoub; Maryam Saeidi; Soulmaz Abbasi; Homeira Barzegar	Rowing	Women's lightweight quadruple sculls
Bronze	Elaheh Ahmadi; Mahlagha Jambozorg; Maryam Talebi	Shooting	Women's 50 m rifle 3 positions team
Bronze	Farzad Abdollahi	Taekwondo	Men's 80 kg
Bronze	Sara Khoshjamal Fekri	Taekwondo	Women's 46 kg
Bronze	Samaneh Sheshpari	Taekwondo	Women's 53 kg
Bronze	Sousan Hajipour	Taekwondo	Women's 57 kg
Bronze	Sajjad Anoushiravani	Weightlifting	Men's +105 kg
Bronze	Fardin Masoumi	Wrestling	Men's freestyle 120 kg
Bronze	Farshad Alizadeh	Wrestling	Men's Greco-Roman 74 kg
Bronze	Ehsan Peighambari	Wushu	Men's changquan
Bronze	Sajjad Abbasi	Wushu	Men's sanshou 70 kg
Bronze	Elaheh Mansourian	Wushu	Women's sanshou 52 kg

== Results by event ==
=== Aquatics ===
==== Diving ====
Athlete	Event	Preliminary		Final	
Athlete	Event	Score	Rank	Score	Rank
Ghaem Mirabian	Men's 1 m springboard	—N/a		318.90	9
Mojtaba Valipour	Men's 1 m springboard	—N/a		345.25	7
Ghaem Mirabian	Men's 3 m springboard	359.30	9 Q	329.60	10
Shahbaz Shahnazi	Men's 3 m springboard	335.50	12 Q	281.10	12
Shahnam Nazarpour	Men's 10 m platform	DNF	—	Did not advance	
Ghaem Mirabian; Mojtaba Valipour	Men's synchronized 3 m springboard	—N/a		338.52	6
Shahnam Nazarpour; Mojtaba Valipour	Men's synchronized 10 m platform	—N/a		357.78	6

==== Swimming ====
Athlete	Event	Heats		Final	
Athlete	Event	Time	Rank	Time	Rank
Mohammad Bidarian	Men's 50 m freestyle	23.83	17	Did not advance	
Pasha Vahdati	Men's 50 m freestyle	23.70	13	Did not advance	
Mohammad Bidarian	Men's 100 m freestyle	52.13	18	Did not advance	
Pasha Vahdati	Men's 100 m freestyle	53.25	28	Did not advance	
Saeid Maleka Ashtiani	Men's 200 m freestyle	1:55.04	19	Did not advance	
Jamal Chavoshifar	Men's 50 m backstroke	27.70	18	Did not advance	
Jamal Chavoshifar	Men's 100 m backstroke	1:00.39	21	Did not advance	
Mohammad Alirezaei	Men's 50 m breaststroke	27.95	2 Q	28.15	4
Soroush Khajegi	Men's 50 m breaststroke	30.54	24	Did not advance	
Mohammad Alirezaei	Men's 100 m breaststroke	1:03.02	8 Q	1:03.17	8
Soroush Khajegi	Men's 100 m breaststroke	1:06.53	23	Did not advance	
Soroush Khajegi	Men's 200 m breaststroke	2:27.99	17	Did not advance	
Saeid Maleka Ashtiani	Men's 200 m individual medley	2:07.19	11	Did not advance	
Saeid Maleka Ashtiani	Men's 400 m individual medley	4:36.85	13	Did not advance	
Soroush Khajegi; Pasha Vahdati; Saeid Maleka Ashtiani; Mohammad Bidarian	Men's 4 × 100 m freestyle relay	3:28.05	9	Did not advance	
Jamal Chavoshifar; Mohammad Alirezaei; Saeid Maleka Ashtiani; Mohammad Bidarian	Men's 4 × 100 m medley relay	3:48.14	5 Q	DSQ	—

=== Archery ===
Athlete	Event	Ranking round		Round of 64	Round of 32	Round of 16	Quarterfinal	Semifinal	Final	Rank
Athlete	Event	Score	Rank	Round of 64	Round of 32	Round of 16	Quarterfinal	Semifinal	Final	Rank
Hamed Fouri	Men's individual	1277	34	Did not advance						46
Nader Manouchehri	Men's individual	1302	24	Did not advance						44
Keivan Riazimehr	Men's individual	1321	20 Q	Bye	Duangsuwan (THA); W 4–0	Furukawa (JPN); L 3–7	Did not advance			9
Milad Vaziri	Men's individual	1323	19 Q	Bye	Saidiyev (KAZ); L 1–5	Did not advance				17
Nader Manouchehri; Keivan Riazimehr; Milad Vaziri; Hamed Fouri	Men's team	3946	5 Q	—N/a		Nepal; L 200–207	Did not advance			9
Zahra Dehghan	Women's individual	1253	35 Q	—N/a	Buriuly (IND); L 0–4	Did not advance				17
Afrouzeh Molavi	Women's individual	1192	44	—N/a	Did not advance					48
Leila Sakhaeifar	Women's individual	1114	49	—N/a	Did not advance					50
Zahra Shams	Women's individual	1233	39 Q	—N/a	Rochmawati (INA); L 2–4	Did not advance				17
Zahra Dehghan; Afrouzeh Molavi; Zahra Shams; Leila Sakhaeifar	Women's team	3678	10 Q	—N/a		Japan; L 193–219	Did not advance			9

=== Athletics ===
Track

Athlete	Event	Round 1		Semifinal		Final	Rank
Athlete	Event	Time	Rank	Time	Rank	Time	Rank
Reza Bouazar	Men's 400 m	46.80	3	—N/a		Did not advance	9
Sajjad Hashemi	Men's 400 m	47.77	4	—N/a		Did not advance	13
Amir Moradi	Men's 800 m	1:47.98	4 q	—N/a		DNF	—
Sajjad Moradi	Men's 800 m	1:49.05	1 Q	—N/a		1:45.45 GR	1st place, gold medalist(s)
Sajjad Moradi	Men's 1500 m	3:53.85	3 Q	—N/a		3:37.09	2nd place, silver medalist(s)
Rouhollah Asgari	Men's 110 m hurdles	14.30	5 q	—N/a		DNF	—
Reza Bouazar; Edvard Mangasar; Sajjad Hashemi; Amir Moradi	Men's 4 × 400 m relay	DSQ	—	—N/a		Did not advance	—
Maryam Tousi	Women's 100 m	12.03	4 q	11.92	7	Did not advance	14
Maryam Tousi	Women's 200 m	24.45	3 q	—N/a		24.56	8
Leila Ebrahimi	Women's 800 m	2:13.34	5	—N/a		Did not advance	16
Leila Ebrahimi	Women's 1500 m	—N/a				4:27.73	10

Field

Athlete	Event	Qualification		Final	
Athlete	Event	Result	Rank	Result	Rank
Keivan Ghanbarzadeh	Men's high jump	2.15	4 q	2.19	8
Mohsen Rabbani	Men's pole vault	—N/a		5.20	4
Amin Nikfar	Men's shot put	—N/a		19.08	5
Ehsan Haddadi	Men's discus throw	—N/a		67.99 GR	1st place, gold medalist(s)
Mohammad Samimi	Men's discus throw	—N/a		63.46	2nd place, silver medalist(s)
Kaveh Mousavi	Men's hammer throw	—N/a		68.90	2nd place, silver medalist(s)
Mehdi Ravaei	Men's javelin throw	—N/a		74.31	7
Leila Rajabi	Women's shot put	—N/a		16.51	6

Combined

Athlete	Event	100m	LJ	SP	HJ	400m	110mH	DT	PV	JT	1500m	Total	Rank
Hadi Sepehrzad	Men's decathlon	10.90; 883	6.79 m 764	DNS	—	—	—	—	—	—	—	DNF	—
Athlete	Event	100mH	HJ	SP	200m	LJ	JT	800m	—N/a			Total	Rank
Sepideh Tavakkoli	Women's heptathlon	14.95; 848	1.74 m 903	10.57 m 567	26.79; 729	5.19 m 612	31.44 m 504	2:30.89; 682	—N/a			4845	6

=== Basketball ===
Team	Event	Qualification round	Preliminary round						Quarterfinal	Semifinal	Final	Rank
Team	Event	Qualification round	Round 1	Round 2	Round 3	Round 4	Round 5	Rank	Quarterfinal	Semifinal	Final	Rank
Iran	Men	Bye	Philippines; W 65–48	Japan; L 56–57	India; W 78–63	Chinese Taipei; W 73–72	Qatar; W 88–46	2 Q	Jordan; W 67–43	China; L 65–68	3rd place match Japan; W 74–66	3rd place, bronze medalist(s)
Roster: Amir Amini; Aren Davoudi; Javad Davari; Mehdi Kamrani; Saeid Davarpanah; Oshin Sahakian; Hamed Afagh; Hamed Sohrabnejad; Ali Jamshidi; Asghar Kardoust; Samad Nikkhah Bahrami; Ali Doraghi; Coach: (Serbia) Veselin Matić

=== Boxing ===
Athlete	Event	Round of 32	Round of 16	Quarterfinal	Semifinal	Final	Rank
Masoud Rigi	Men's 49 kg	Waseem (PAK); L 1–3	Did not advance				17
Omran Akbari	Men's 56 kg	Leong (MAC); W RSCOS	Işankulyýew (TKM); W 10–1	Petchkoom (THA); L 2–4	Did not advance		5
Foroutan Golara	Men's 60 kg	Shrestha (NEP); W RSC	Wangdi (BHU); W 13–3	Tojibaev (UZB); L 3–7	Did not advance		5
Houman Karami	Men's 64 kg	Bye	Zaki (KSA); W 15–2	Yeleussinov (KAZ); L 0–12	Did not advance		5
Morteza Sepahvand	Men's 69 kg	Bye	Al-Azemi (IOC); W RSC	Maimaitituersun (CHN); L 6–13	Did not advance		5
Mohammad Sattarpour	Men's 75 kg	Bye	Khan (PAK); W 16–1	Abdul-Ridha (IRQ); W 8–5	Singh (IND); L 7–10	Did not advance	3rd place, bronze medalist(s)
Ehsan Rouzbahani	Men's 81 kg	—N/a	Teimat (JOR); W 9–2	Rasulov (UZB); L 1–3	Did not advance		5
Ali Mazaheri	Men's 91 kg	—N/a	Bye	Abdullaev (UZB); W 6–5	Ghossoun (SYR); L 1–2	Did not advance	3rd place, bronze medalist(s)
Rouhollah Hosseini	Men's +91 kg	—N/a	Bye	Khan (PAK); W 4–0	Dychko (KAZ); L 4–6	Did not advance	3rd place, bronze medalist(s)

=== Canoeing ===
==== Slalom ====
Athlete	Event	Heats		Semifinal		Final	
Athlete	Event	Time	Rank	Time	Rank	Time	Rank
Homayoun Mohammadpour	Men's C1	117.34	7 Q	DSQR	— Q	123.58	6
Bardia Mehrjoo; Amir Mohammad Fattahpour	Men's C2	113.17	5 Q	126.23	4 Q	179.73	7

==== Sprint ====
Athlete	Event	Heat		Semifinal		Final	Rank
Athlete	Event	Time	Rank	Time	Rank	Time	Rank
Shahoo Nasseri	Men's C1 200 m	43.183	3 QF	Bye		42.180	5
Shahoo Nasseri	Men's C1 1000 m	3:55.452	2 QF	Bye		3:53.232	2nd place, silver medalist(s)
Amin Boudaghi	Men's K1 200 m	40.554	4 QS	38.846	1 Q	39.629	7
Ahmad Reza Talebian	Men's K1 1000 m	3:36.531	1 QF	Bye		3:34.256	1st place, gold medalist(s)
Arvand Darvish; Alireza Alimohammadi	Men's K2 200 m	37.011	4 QS	36.713	2 Q	36.382	8
Arvand Darvish; Alireza Alimohammadi	Men's K2 1000 m	3:20.477	2 QF	Bye		3:21.943	5
Hossein Sinkaei; Ahmad Reza Talebian; Farzin Asadi; Amin Boudaghi	Men's K4 1000 m	3:00.405	2 QF	Bye		2:58.843	3rd place, bronze medalist(s)
Arezoo Motamedi	Women's K1 200 m	46.026	3 QF	Bye		44.924	6
Arezoo Motamedi	Women's K1 500 m	1:56.758	3 QF	Bye		1:56.038	5
Dorsa Kafili; Sima Orouji	Women's K2 500 m	1:50.302	4 QS	1:52.866	1 Q	1:52.707	6

=== Chess ===
Individual rapid

Athlete	Event	Swiss round									Rank
Athlete	Event	Round 1	Round 2	Round 3	Round 4	Round 5	Round 6	Round 7	Round 8	Round 9	Rank
Ehsan Ghaemmaghami	Men	Shrestha (NEP); W 1–0	Kakageldiýew (TKM); D ½–½	Moradi (IRI); D ½–½	Bassim (IRQ); W 1–0	Sadvakasov (KAZ); L 0–1	Saleh (UAE); W 1–0	Megaranto (INA); L 0–1	Battulga (MGL); L 0–1	Al-Zendani (YEM); W 1–0	18
Elshan Moradi	Men	Lee (KOR); W 1–0	Sasikiran (IND); D ½–½	Ghaemmaghami (IRI); D ½–½	Kojima (JPN); W 1–0	Ni (CHN); L 0–1	Battulga (MGL); W WO	Ganguly (IND); L 0–1	Shrestha (NEP); W 1–0	Battulga (MGL); L 0–1	17
Shadi Paridar	Women	Byun (KOR); W 1–0	Zhao (CHN); L 0–1	Worya (IRQ); W 1–0	Sukandar (INA); D ½–½	Muminova (UZB); L 0–1	Liza (BAN); W 1–0	Geldiýewa (TKM); D ½–½	Nakhbayeva (KAZ); W 1–0	Hoàng (VIE); D ½–½	10
Atousa Pourkashian	Women	Khamboo (NEP); W 1–0	Nakhbayeva (KAZ); L 0–1	Bakri (MAS); W 1–0	Nodirjanova (UZB); W 1–0	Dronavalli (IND); L 0–1	Hisham (MAS); W 1–0	Hoàng (VIE); L 0–1	Muminova (UZB); L 0–1	Dauletova (KAZ); D ½–½	17

Team standard

Athlete	Event	Swiss round								Semifinal	Final	Rank
Athlete	Event	Round 1	Round 2	Round 3	Round 4	Round 5	Round 6	Round 7	Rank	Semifinal	Final	Rank
Ehsan Ghaemmaghami; Elshan Moradi; Morteza Mahjoub; Homayoun Tofighi; Asghar Golizadeh	Men	South Korea; W 4–0	Vietnam; L ½–3½	Yemen; W 4–0	Mongolia; D 2–2	China; L 1–3	Iraq; W 3½–½	India; D 2–2	4 Q	China; L 1½–2½	3rd place match India; L ½–3½	4
Atousa Pourkashian; Shadi Paridar; Mitra Hejazipour; Ghazal Hakimifard; Shayesteh Ghaderpour	Women	Syria; W 4–0	China; L 1–3	Vietnam; L 1½–2½	Turkmenistan; W 2½–1½	Uzbekistan; L 1½–2½	South Korea; W 4–0	Bangladesh; W 3½–½	5	Did not advance		5

=== Cue sports ===
Athlete	Event	Round of 64	Round of 32	Round of 16	Quarterfinal	Semifinal	Final	Rank
Hossein Vafaei	Men's snooker	Bye	Lương (VIE); W 4–0	Poomjaeng (THA); L 1–4	Did not advance			9
Soheil Vahedi	Men's snooker	Bye	Fu (HKG); L 0–4	Did not advance				17
Ehsan Heidarinejad; Hossein Vafaei; Soheil Vahedi	Men's snooker team	—N/a	Bye	Philippines; W 3–1	Thailand; L 2–3	Did not advance		5

=== Cycling ===
==== Road ====
Athlete	Event	Time	Rank
Hassan Maleki	Men's road race	4:17:05	34
Mehdi Sohrabi	Men's road race	4:14:54	9
Hossein Askari	Men's individual time trial	1:08:48.49	3rd place, bronze medalist(s)

==== Track ====
Sprint

Athlete	Event	Qualifying		Round of 32	Round of 32 Repechage	Round of 16	Round of 16 Repechage	Quarterfinal	Semifinal	Final	Rank
Athlete	Event	Time	Rank	Round of 32	Round of 32 Repechage	Round of 16	Round of 16 Repechage	Quarterfinal	Semifinal	Final	Rank
Farshid Farsinejadian	Men's sprint	10.779	9 Q	Son (KOR); W 1–0	Bye	Nitta (JPN); L 0–1	Rank 1 Q	Kitatsuru (JPN); L 0–2	Did not advance	5th–8th places Rank 3	7
Hassan Ali Varposhti	Men's sprint	10.474	6 Q	Singh (IND); W 1–0	Bye	Yunus (MAS); W 1–0	Bye	Awang (MAS); L 0–2	Did not advance	5th–8th places Rank 1	5
Farshid Farsinejadian; Mahmoud Parash; Hassan Ali Varposhti	Men's team sprint	45.146	4 QB	—N/a						3rd place match Malaysia; W 44.815–45.175	3rd place, bronze medalist(s)

Keirin

Athlete	Event	Round 1	Repechage	Round 2	Final	Rank
Athlete	Event	Rank	Rank	Rank	Rank	Rank
Mahmoud Parash	Men's keirin	4	1 Q	6 QB	Final B 1	7
Mohammad Parash	Men's keirin	2 Q	Bye	2 Q	DNF	5

Endurance

Athlete	Event	Qualifying		Round 1		Final	Rank
Athlete	Event	Time / Score	Rank	Time	Rank	Final	Rank
Alireza Haghi	Men's individual pursuit	4:34.503	4 Q	Zargari (IRI); W 4:35.477–4:42.899	4 QB	3rd place match Li (CHN); L 4:40.041–4:37.458	4
Amir Zargari	Men's individual pursuit	4:34.850	5 Q	Haghi (IRI); L 4:42.899–4:35.477	6	Did not advance	6
Abbas Saeidi Tanha	Men's points race	6 pts	5 Q	—N/a		DNF	—
Mehdi Sohrabi	Men's points race	25 pts	6 Q	—N/a		60 pts	3rd place, bronze medalist(s)
Alireza Haghi; Arvin Moazzami; Mehdi Sohrabi; Amir Zargari; Abbas Saeidi Tanha (heats)	Men's team pursuit	4:21.022	5 Q	Malaysia; W 4:15.225–4:18.596	4 QB	3rd place match China; L 4:17.993–4:11.349	4

=== Dragon boat ===
Athlete	Event	Heat		Repechage		Final		Rank
Athlete	Event	Time	Rank	Time	Rank	Time	Rank	Rank
Meisam Abbasi; Ali Alipour; Reza Bahraei; Jafar Boroumand; Mohammad Reza Dadashi; Hadi Daryaeinejad; Salman Fathinia; Sajjad Gharibi; Mohsen Ghofrani; Vahid Hajizadeh; Milad Hassanzadi; Salar Kaboutari; Mehdi Khabbaz Kohan; Abolghasem Mazloumi; Mehdi Mehri; Arshid Nasseri; Abdolmajid Rasouli; Mohammad Reza Rezaei; Pejman Sadraei; Pouyan Sadraei; Rouhollah Salehian; Sajjad Soleimani; Omid Soleimani; Mohammad Zebarpour	Men's 250 m	53.282	4	54.060	2 QB	Final B 54.779	2	8
Meisam Abbasi; Ali Alipour; Reza Bahraei; Jafar Boroumand; Mohammad Reza Dadashi; Hadi Daryaeinejad; Salman Fathinia; Sajjad Gharibi; Mohsen Ghofrani; Vahid Hajizadeh; Milad Hassanzadi; Salar Kaboutari; Mehdi Khabbaz Kohan; Abolghasem Mazloumi; Mehdi Mehri; Arshid Nasseri; Abdolmajid Rasouli; Mohammad Reza Rezaei; Pejman Sadraei; Pouyan Sadraei; Rouhollah Salehian; Sajjad Soleimani; Omid Soleimani; Mohammad Zebarpour	Men's 500 m	1:49.119	2	1:52.199	2 QB	Final B 1:51.791	2	8
Meisam Abbasi; Ali Alipour; Reza Bahraei; Jafar Boroumand; Mohammad Reza Dadashi; Hadi Daryaeinejad; Salman Fathinia; Sajjad Gharibi; Mohsen Ghofrani; Vahid Hajizadeh; Milad Hassanzadi; Salar Kaboutari; Mehdi Khabbaz Kohan; Abolghasem Mazloumi; Mehdi Mehri; Arshid Nasseri; Abdolmajid Rasouli; Mohammad Reza Rezaei; Pejman Sadraei; Pouyan Sadraei; Rouhollah Salehian; Sajjad Soleimani; Omid Soleimani; Mohammad Zebarpour	Men's 1000 m	3:43.852	2 QA	Bye		3:41.682	6	6
Kobra Absalan; Fereshteh Ahmadi; Behnoush Akaberi; Diana Amini; Mitra Azizi; Mitra Barzegar; Azam Daneshvar; Yasaman Darparnian; Sahar Hefzi; Kimia Mahdaviani; Zahra Mirakhori; Samaneh Mohagheghian; Fatemeh Moradkhani; Niloufar Mousavi; Homa Najibi; Banafsheh Rahgozar; Sheida Ramezani; Mehraneh Sayyad; Sogand Sedighi; Neda Taheri; Fatemeh Tat-Hesari; Sara Zainali; Fariba Zare; Mahnaz Zare	Women's 250 m	1:03.188	3	1:02.608	2 QB	Final B 1:04.397	3	6
Kobra Absalan; Fereshteh Ahmadi; Behnoush Akaberi; Diana Amini; Mitra Azizi; Mitra Barzegar; Azam Daneshvar; Yasaman Darparnian; Sahar Hefzi; Kimia Mahdaviani; Zahra Mirakhori; Samaneh Mohagheghian; Fatemeh Moradkhani; Niloufar Mousavi; Homa Najibi; Banafsheh Rahgozar; Sheida Ramezani; Mehraneh Sayyad; Sogand Sedighi; Neda Taheri; Fatemeh Tat-Hesari; Sara Zainali; Fariba Zare; Mahnaz Zare	Women's 500 m	2:09.345	2	2:12.601	3 QB	Final B 2:15.258	3	6
Kobra Absalan; Fereshteh Ahmadi; Behnoush Akaberi; Diana Amini; Mitra Azizi; Mitra Barzegar; Azam Daneshvar; Yasaman Darparnian; Sahar Hefzi; Kimia Mahdaviani; Zahra Mirakhori; Samaneh Mohagheghian; Fatemeh Moradkhani; Niloufar Mousavi; Homa Najibi; Banafsheh Rahgozar; Sheida Ramezani; Mehraneh Sayyad; Sogand Sedighi; Neda Taheri; Fatemeh Tat-Hesari; Sara Zainali; Fariba Zare; Mahnaz Zare	Women's 1000 m	4:25.956	2	4:29.498	4 QB	Final B 4:32.357	3	6

=== Fencing ===
Épée

Athlete	Event	Pool round		Round of 32	Round of 16	Quarterfinal	Semifinal	Final	Rank
Athlete	Event	Results	Rank	Round of 32	Round of 16	Quarterfinal	Semifinal	Final	Rank
Mohammad Rezaei	Men's individual	Jung (KOR) L 3–5; Katchiourine (KGZ) L 0–1; Aleksandrov (UZB) W 5–2; Michon (LIB) L 4–5; Đỗ (VIE) W 5–3; Abu Assaf (JOR) L 4–5	24 Q	Katchiourine (KGZ); L 7–15	Did not advance				24
Ali Yaghoubian	Men's individual	Kim (KOR) L 3–5; Ivanov (KGZ) L 3–5; Basediya (IND) W 5–2; Al-Yami (QAT) L 3–5; Malallah (IOC) W 5–3	18 Q	Aleksandrov (UZB); W 15–12	Alimzhanov (KAZ); L 7–15	Did not advance			15
Sadegh Abedi; Mohammad Rezaei; Hamed Sedaghati; Ali Yaghoubian	Men's team	—N/a			Athletes from Kuwait; L 40–45	Did not advance			10

Foil

Athlete	Event	Pool round		Round of 32	Round of 16	Quarterfinal	Semifinal	Final	Rank
Athlete	Event	Results	Rank	Round of 32	Round of 16	Quarterfinal	Semifinal	Final	Rank
Javad Rezaei	Men's individual	Kwon (KOR) L 3–5; Chida (JPN) L 2–5; Al-Amoodi (QAT) W 5–1; Al-Mansoori (UAE) W 5–2; Al-Waleed (IOC) W 5–1	12 Q	Al-Mansoori (UAE); W 15–6	Ota (JPN); L 8–15	Did not advance			12
Hamed Sayyad Ghanbari	Men's individual	Ota (JPN) L 4–5; Cheung (HKG) L 4–5; Zaimi (MAS) L 2–5; Singh (IND) W 5–1; Al-Mansoori (UAE) W 5–2; Bùi (VIE) L 4–5	17 Q	Al-Waleed (IOC); L 14–15	Did not advance				19
Javad Rezaei; Mohammad Rezaei; Hamed Sayyad Ghanbari; Shervin Tolouei	Men's team	—N/a			India; W 45–20	China; L 22–45	Did not advance		7

Sabre

Athlete	Event	Pool round		Round of 32	Round of 16	Quarterfinal	Semifinal	Final	Rank
Athlete	Event	Results	Rank	Round of 32	Round of 16	Quarterfinal	Semifinal	Final	Rank
Mojtaba Abedini	Men's individual	Wang (CHN) L 0–5; Mendoza (PHI) W 5–3; Frolov (KAZ) L 2–5; Hamid (BRU) W 5–1	11 Q	Bye	Yamamoto (JPN); W 15–13	Wang (CHN); L 4–15	Did not advance		8
Hamid Reza Taherkhani	Men's individual	Gu (KOR) L 1–5; Yamamoto (JPN) L 3–5; Barzegar (QAT) W 5–1; Walia (IND) L 3–5; Al-Shamlan (IOC) W 5–3	14 Q	Bye	Wang (CHN); L 6–15	Did not advance			14
Mojtaba Abedini; Parviz Darvishi; Amin Ghorbani; Hamid Reza Taherkhani	Men's team	—N/a				Kazakhstan; L 28–45	Did not advance		5

=== Football ===
Team	Event	Preliminary round				Round of 16	Quarterfinal	Semifinal	Final	Rank
Team	Event	Round 1	Round 2	Round 3	Rank	Round of 16	Quarterfinal	Semifinal	Final	Rank
Iran	Men	Turkmenistan; W 4–1	Bahrain; W 1–0	Vietnam; W 1–0	1 Q	Malaysia; W 3–1	Oman; W 1–0	Japan; L 1–2	3rd place match South Korea; L 3–4	4
Roster: Mehdi Rahmati; Amir Sharafi; Jalal Hosseini; Reza Talabeh; Kamal Kamyabinia; Hamid Reza Aliasgari; Ehsan Hajsafi; Gholamreza Rezaei; Karim Ansarifard; Mohsen Mosalman; Saleh Khalilazad; Ali Zeinali; Masoud Ebrahimzadeh; Ali Marzban; Arash Afshin; Sina Ashouri; Rasoul Kor; Mehdi Daghagheleh; Iman Mousavi; Mohammad Rashid Mazaheri; Coach: Gholam Hossein Peyrovani

=== Gymnastics ===
Men – Qualification

Athlete	Event	Floor		Pommel horse		Rings		Vault		Parallel bars		Horizontal bar		Total	
Athlete	Event	Score	Rank	Score	Rank	Score	Rank	Score	Rank	Score	Rank	Score	Rank	Score	Rank
Amir Azami	Individual	13.400	40	11.400	52	14.300	19	14.350	—N/a	13.100	40	11.900	48	78.450	26 QR
Vahid Izadfar	Individual	—N/a		13.000	29	13.400	32	15.250	—N/a	—N/a		—N/a		41.650	71
Hadi Khanarinejad	Individual	14.100	25	12.700	33	15.350	7 Q	14.650	—N/a	12.750	47	12.350	45	81.900	14 Q
Ehsan Khodadadi	Individual	13.750	32	—N/a		13.650	27	14.600	—N/a	13.550	32	13.400	29	68.950	39 (40)
Mohammad Ramezanpour	Individual	14.350	14	13.300	24	13.200	40	15.625	9	13.350	36	12.900	37	83.050	12 Q
Younes Zeighami	Individual	12.050	58	10.650	60	—N/a		—N/a		13.900	26	12.900	38	49.500	62
Amir Azami; Vahid Izadfar; Hadi Khanarinejad; Ehsan Khodadadi; Mohammad Ramezanpour; Younes Zeighami	Team	55.600		50.400		56.700		60.450		53.900		51.550		328.600	8

Men – Finals

Athlete	Event	FX	PH	SR	VT	PB	HB	Total	Rank
Amir Azami	Individual all-around	12.800	11.800	14.350	14.550	13.150	12.650	79.300	14
Hadi Khanarinejad	Individual all-around	Withdrew							27
Mohammad Ramezanpour	Individual all-around	13.900	12.350	13.250	15.800	13.800	12.950	82.050	10
Hadi Khanarinejad	Rings	—N/a		12.700	—N/a				8

=== Handball ===
Team	Event	Preliminary round					Semifinal	Final	Rank
Team	Event	Round 1	Round 2	Round 3	Round 4	Rank	Semifinal	Final	Rank
Iran	Men	Hong Kong; W 35–13	Bahrain; W 31–24	South Korea; L 29–31	Athletes from Kuwait; W 32–27	2 Q	Japan; W 30–29	South Korea; L 28–32	2nd place, silver medalist(s)
Roster: Abbas Asadzadeh; Milad Masaeli; Mohammad Reza Rajabi; Ehsan Abouei; Omid Sekenari; Sajjad Esteki; Masoud Zohrabi; Mostafa Sadati; Allahkaram Esteki; Javad Khorramipour; Erfan Saeidi; Mehrdad Samsami; Jalal Kiani; Saeid Barkhordari; Mohammad Mehdi Asgari; Mehdi Bijari; Coach: (Slovenia) Borut Maček

=== Judo ===
Athlete	Event	Round of 32	Round of 16	Quarterfinal	Semifinal	Final	Rank
Mohsen Ghaffar	Men's 60 kg	Bye	Chana (IND); L 000–110	Did not advance			9
Arash Miresmaeili	Men's 66 kg	Al-Ali (IOC); W 101–000	Yang (CHN); W 100–000	Kim (KOR); L 000–100	Repechage; Hong (PRK); L 001–020	Did not advance	7
Ali Maloumat	Men's 73 kg	Jin (CHN); W 100–001	Boqiev (TJK); L 000–002	Did not advance			9
Mohammad Jamali	Men's 81 kg	Bye	Rahimov (TJK); W 100–010	Muminov (UZB); L 000–010	Repechage; Takamatsu (JPN); L 000–100	Did not advance	7
Hossein Ghomi	Men's 90 kg	Lee (KOR); L 000–100	Did not advance				17
Javad Mahjoub	Men's 100 kg	Bye	Yahata (PHI); W 100–000	Anai (JPN); L 000–100	Repechage; Tüvshinbayar (MGL); L 000–101	Did not advance	7
Mohammad Reza Roudaki	Men's +100 kg	—N/a	Sugarjargal (MGL); W 100–000	Kim (KOR); L 000–111	Repechage; Krakovetskii (KGZ); W 111–000	3rd place match Shynkeyev (KAZ); W 100–000	3rd place, bronze medalist(s)
Mohammad Reza Roudaki	Men's openweight	—N/a	Zaidan (KSA); W 020–000	Kurbanov (UZB); W 012–010	Wang (CHN); W 111–000	Takahashi (JPN); L 000–100	2nd place, silver medalist(s)
Noushin Taghiloo	Women's 52 kg	—N/a	Bundmaa (MGL); L 000–101	Did not advance			9
Akram Khani	Women's 57 kg	Pongchaliew (THA); L 000–010	Did not advance				17
Toktam Bidel	Women's 63 kg	—N/a	Wang (TPE); L 000–101	Did not advance			9

=== Kabaddi ===
Team	Event	Preliminary round				Semifinal	Final	Rank
Team	Event	Round 1	Round 2	Round 3	Rank	Semifinal	Final	Rank
Iran	Men	South Korea; W 55–20	India; L 24–40	—N/a	2 Q	Pakistan; W 17–16	India; L 20–37	2nd place, silver medalist(s)
Iran	Women	Chinese Taipei; W 62–18	Thailand; L 38–41	Malaysia; W 73–10	2 Q	India; L 22–23	Did not advance	3rd place, bronze medalist(s)
Roster – Men: Reza Kamali Moghaddam; Morteza Shahidi; Nasser Roumiani; Fazel Atrachali; Meisam Abbasi; Mehdi Mousavi; Siamak Rezagholi; Abouzar Mohajer; Mehdi Safaeian; Kianoush Naderian; Ebad Dalili; Mostafa Nodehi; Coach: (India) Ashan Kumar Roster – Women: Soheila Solbi; Fatemeh Momeni; Saeideh Maghsoudloo; Maliheh Miri; Shilan Sharezouli; Ghazal Khalaj; Farideh Zarifdoust; Zahra Masoumabadi; Samira Shabani; Salimeh Abdollahbakhsh; Marzieh Eshghi; Sedigheh Jafari; Coach: Azam Maghsoudloo

=== Karate ===
Athlete	Event	Round of 32	Round of 16	Quarterfinal	Semifinal	Final	Rank
Mohammad Ghasemi	Men's 55 kg	—N/a	Dahal (NEP); W 1–0	Ahmadi (AFG); W 3–0	Puvaneswaran (MAS); L 0–1	3rd place match Hsieh (TPE); L 0–1	5
Amir Mehdizadeh	Men's 60 kg	Bye	Sindhiya (IND); W 5–1	Assadilov (KAZ); L 3–5	Repechage; Trần (VIE); L 6–9	Did not advance	7
Jasem Vishkaei	Men's 84 kg	Bye	Khair (JOR); W 6–2	Mahamut (MAS); W 2–1	Jang (KOR); W 2–0	Araga (JPN); W 6–2	1st place, gold medalist(s)
Zabihollah Pourshab	Men's +84 kg	—N/a	Bye	Muneer (IOC); W 2–0	Khalidov (KAZ); W 2–0	Syarief (INA); W 7–3	1st place, gold medalist(s)
Fatemeh Ghasemi	Women's 50 kg	—N/a	Vũ (VIE); L 0–2	Did not advance	Repechage; Chen (TPE); L 0–3	Did not advance	7
Fatemeh Chalaki	Women's 55 kg	—N/a	Khupovets (KAZ); W 2–1	Kobayashi (JPN); L 0–3	Did not advance	3rd place match Pabillore (PHI); W 1–0	3rd place, bronze medalist(s)
Samira Malekipour	Women's 68 kg	—N/a	Bye	Honma (JPN); L 0–2	Did not advance	3rd place match Asmuruf (INA); W 7–3	3rd place, bronze medalist(s)
Hamideh Abbasali	Women's +68 kg	—N/a		Chaikuzova (KAZ); L 1–2	Did not advance		7

=== Roller speed skating ===
Athlete	Event	Heat		Final	Rank
Athlete	Event	Rank	Time	Time / Score	Rank
Mohammad Salehi	Men's 300 m time trial	—N/a		25.864	7
Mohammad Salehi	Men's 500 m sprint	43.462	5	Did not advance	7
Mohammad Salehi	Men's 10000 m points elimination	—N/a		Eliminated	8
Niloufar Mardani	Women's 300 m time trial	—N/a		DNS	—
Niloufar Mardani	Women's 500 m sprint	47.891	4	Did not advance	7
Niloufar Mardani	Women's 10000 m points elimination	—N/a		Eliminated	8

=== Rowing ===
Athlete	Event	Heat		Repechage		Final		Rank
Athlete	Event	Time	Rank	Time	Rank	Time	Rank	Rank
Taher Kaboutari	Men's single sculls	7:27.01	5	7:22.94	3 QB	Final B 7:18.05	1	7
Mojtaba Shojaei; Alireza Atabaki	Men's double sculls	6:36.20	3 QA	—N/a		6:39.02	5	5
Farzad Gholizadeh; Saeid Adeli; Farhad Gholizadeh; Vahid Johari	Men's coxless four	6:34.47	6 QA	—N/a		6:31.36	6	6
Meisam Johari; Yaser Johari; Abedin Bagherirad; Farzin Rezaei; Fardin Hassanvand; Masoud Mohammadi; Atabak Pishyar; Afshar Heidari; Keyhan Shamsi	Men's eight	6:10.90	4 QA	—N/a		6:14.28	4	4
Mohsen Shadi	Men's lightweight single sculls	7:01.35	1 QA	Bye		6:55.62	1	1st place, gold medalist(s)
Aghel Habibian; Hassan Jahanian	Men's lightweight double sculls	6:44.85	3	6:37.80	2 QA	6:54.83	6	6
Nasim Benyaghoub	Women's single sculls	8:46.07	5 QA	—N/a		9:08.60	5	5
Fatemeh Khalaj Hedayati; Nazanin Malaei	Women's lightweight double sculls	7:27.14	3	7:19.93	3 QA	7:30.15	5	5
Nasim Benyaghoub; Maryam Saeidi; Soulmaz Abbasi; Homeira Barzegar	Women's lightweight quadruple sculls	6:54.63	3 QA	—N/a		6:52.45	3	3rd place, bronze medalist(s)

=== Sailing ===
Athlete	Event	Race												Total	Rank
Athlete	Event	1	2	3	4	5	6	7	8	9	10	11	12	Total	Rank
Sina Arash	Men's RS:X	~~11~~	11	10	11	10	10	10	10	10	10	10	11	113	10
Keivan Hassanzadeh	Men's Optimist	2	7	8	8	8	4	8	8	6	~~9~~	7	3	69	7
Mohammad Oj-Hormozi; Majid Seifi	Men's 420	7	6	7	8	7	8	8	~~9~~	7	8	8	8	82	8
Fatemeh Jafari	Women's Optimist	7	7	8	7	9	5	9	8	7	8	~~10~~	8	83	8
Parisa Moradi; Kimia Minabinejad	Women's 420	5	5	5	5	5	5	5	5	5	~~7~~	5	5	55	5
Hossein Issapour; Mohammad Rahi	Open Hobie 16	~~8~~	6	6	6	6	6	7	7	6	6	6	6	68	6

=== Shooting ===
Athlete	Event	Qualification		Final			Team events			
Athlete	Event	Score	Rank	Score	Total	Rank	Athlete	Event	Score	Rank
Mohammad Ahmadi	Men's 10 m air pistol	566	30	Did not advance			Mohammad Ahmadi; Ebrahim Barkhordari; Mohsen Nasr Esfahani	Men's 10 m air pistol team	1691	10
Ebrahim Barkhordari	Men's 10 m air pistol	578	11	Did not advance			Mohammad Ahmadi; Ebrahim Barkhordari; Mohsen Nasr Esfahani	Men's 10 m air pistol team	1691	10
Mohsen Nasr Esfahani	Men's 10 m air pistol	547	48	Did not advance			Mohammad Ahmadi; Ebrahim Barkhordari; Mohsen Nasr Esfahani	Men's 10 m air pistol team	1691	10
Mohammad Ahmadi	Men's 25 m center fire pistol	557	35	—N/a			Mohammad Ahmadi; Ebrahim Barkhordari; Reza Karimpour	Men's 25 m center fire pistol team	1703	9
Ebrahim Barkhordari	Men's 25 m center fire pistol	578	12	—N/a			Mohammad Ahmadi; Ebrahim Barkhordari; Reza Karimpour	Men's 25 m center fire pistol team	1703	9
Reza Karimpour	Men's 25 m center fire pistol	568	28	—N/a			Mohammad Ahmadi; Ebrahim Barkhordari; Reza Karimpour	Men's 25 m center fire pistol team	1703	9
Reza Karimpour	Men's 25 m rapid fire pistol	555	20	Did not advance			—N/a			
Mohammad Ahmadi	Men's 25 m standard pistol	549	24	—N/a			Mohammad Ahmadi; Ebrahim Barkhordari; Reza Karimpour	Men's 25 m standard pistol team	1651	7
Ebrahim Barkhordari	Men's 25 m standard pistol	566	9	—N/a			Mohammad Ahmadi; Ebrahim Barkhordari; Reza Karimpour	Men's 25 m standard pistol team	1651	7
Reza Karimpour	Men's 25 m standard pistol	536	35	—N/a			Mohammad Ahmadi; Ebrahim Barkhordari; Reza Karimpour	Men's 25 m standard pistol team	1651	7
Mohammad Ahmadi	Men's 50 m pistol	537	33	Did not advance			Mohammad Ahmadi; Ebrahim Barkhordari; Mohsen Nasr Esfahani	Men's 50 m pistol team	1625	9
Ebrahim Barkhordari	Men's 50 m pistol	544	24	Did not advance			Mohammad Ahmadi; Ebrahim Barkhordari; Mohsen Nasr Esfahani	Men's 50 m pistol team	1625	9
Mohsen Nasr Esfahani	Men's 50 m pistol	544	23	Did not advance			Mohammad Ahmadi; Ebrahim Barkhordari; Mohsen Nasr Esfahani	Men's 50 m pistol team	1625	9
Hossein Bagheri	Men's 10 m air rifle	581	29	Did not advance			Hossein Bagheri; Mehdi Jafari Pouya; Saber Parasti	Men's 10 m air rifle team	1761	5
Mehdi Jafari Pouya	Men's 10 m air rifle	589	17	Did not advance			Hossein Bagheri; Mehdi Jafari Pouya; Saber Parasti	Men's 10 m air rifle team	1761	5
Saber Parasti	Men's 10 m air rifle	591	12	Did not advance			Hossein Bagheri; Mehdi Jafari Pouya; Saber Parasti	Men's 10 m air rifle team	1761	5
Amin Heidari	Men's 50 m rifle prone	584	32	Did not advance			Amin Heidari; Ebrahim Inanloo; Sasan Shahsavari	Men's 50 m rifle prone team	1753	10
Ebrahim Inanloo	Men's 50 m rifle prone	579	47	Did not advance			Amin Heidari; Ebrahim Inanloo; Sasan Shahsavari	Men's 50 m rifle prone team	1753	10
Sasan Shahsavari	Men's 50 m rifle prone	590	14	Did not advance			Amin Heidari; Ebrahim Inanloo; Sasan Shahsavari	Men's 50 m rifle prone team	1753	10
Hossein Bagheri	Men's 50 m rifle 3 positions	1122	33	Did not advance			Hossein Bagheri; Amin Heidari; Sasan Shahsavari	Men's 50 m rifle 3 positions team	3393	8
Amin Heidari	Men's 50 m rifle 3 positions	1134	24	Did not advance			Hossein Bagheri; Amin Heidari; Sasan Shahsavari	Men's 50 m rifle 3 positions team	3393	8
Sasan Shahsavari	Men's 50 m rifle 3 positions	1137	20	Did not advance			Hossein Bagheri; Amin Heidari; Sasan Shahsavari	Men's 50 m rifle 3 positions team	3393	8
Masoud Azizian	Men's double trap	133	12	Did not advance			Masoud Azizian; Amir Chavoshi; Saeid Sadri	Men's double trap team	388	6
Amir Chavoshi	Men's double trap	124	25	Did not advance			Masoud Azizian; Amir Chavoshi; Saeid Sadri	Men's double trap team	388	6
Saeid Sadri	Men's double trap	131	15	Did not advance			Masoud Azizian; Amir Chavoshi; Saeid Sadri	Men's double trap team	388	6
Elham Harijani	Women's 10 m air pistol	367	38	Did not advance			Elham Harijani; Fatemeh Hosseini; Zeinab Ramezani	Women's 10 m air pistol team	1114	10
Fatemeh Hosseini	Women's 10 m air pistol	377	20	Did not advance			Elham Harijani; Fatemeh Hosseini; Zeinab Ramezani	Women's 10 m air pistol team	1114	10
Zeinab Ramezani	Women's 10 m air pistol	370	33	Did not advance			Elham Harijani; Fatemeh Hosseini; Zeinab Ramezani	Women's 10 m air pistol team	1114	10
Elham Harijani	Women's 25 m pistol	564	29	Did not advance			Elham Harijani; Fatemeh Hosseini; Zeinab Ramezani	Women's 25 m pistol team	1708	9
Fatemeh Hosseini	Women's 25 m pistol	572	20	Did not advance			Elham Harijani; Fatemeh Hosseini; Zeinab Ramezani	Women's 25 m pistol team	1708	9
Zeinab Ramezani	Women's 25 m pistol	572	21	Did not advance			Elham Harijani; Fatemeh Hosseini; Zeinab Ramezani	Women's 25 m pistol team	1708	9
Elaheh Ahmadi	Women's 10 m air rifle	397	4 Q	102.1	499.1	7	Elaheh Ahmadi; Narjes Emamgholinejad; Mahlagha Jambozorg	Women's 10 m air rifle team	1192	2nd place, silver medalist(s)
Narjes Emamgholinejad	Women's 10 m air rifle	397	7 Q	100.6	497.6	8	Elaheh Ahmadi; Narjes Emamgholinejad; Mahlagha Jambozorg	Women's 10 m air rifle team	1192	2nd place, silver medalist(s)
Mahlagha Jambozorg	Women's 10 m air rifle	398	3 Q	102.7	500.7	5	Elaheh Ahmadi; Narjes Emamgholinejad; Mahlagha Jambozorg	Women's 10 m air rifle team	1192	2nd place, silver medalist(s)
Elaheh Ahmadi	Women's 50 m rifle prone	580	34	—N/a			Elaheh Ahmadi; Mahlagha Jambozorg; Maryam Talebi	Women's 50 m rifle prone team	1743	9
Mahlagha Jambozorg	Women's 50 m rifle prone	580	33	—N/a			Elaheh Ahmadi; Mahlagha Jambozorg; Maryam Talebi	Women's 50 m rifle prone team	1743	9
Maryam Talebi	Women's 50 m rifle prone	583	23	—N/a			Elaheh Ahmadi; Mahlagha Jambozorg; Maryam Talebi	Women's 50 m rifle prone team	1743	9
Elaheh Ahmadi	Women's 50 m rifle 3 positions	582	2 Q	99.4	681.4	2nd place, silver medalist(s)	Elaheh Ahmadi; Mahlagha Jambozorg; Maryam Talebi	Women's 50 m rifle 3 positions team	1719	3rd place, bronze medalist(s)
Mahlagha Jambozorg	Women's 50 m rifle 3 positions	565	26	Did not advance			Elaheh Ahmadi; Mahlagha Jambozorg; Maryam Talebi	Women's 50 m rifle 3 positions team	1719	3rd place, bronze medalist(s)
Maryam Talebi	Women's 50 m rifle 3 positions	572	16	Did not advance			Elaheh Ahmadi; Mahlagha Jambozorg; Maryam Talebi	Women's 50 m rifle 3 positions team	1719	3rd place, bronze medalist(s)
Masoumeh Ameri	Women's trap	60	14	Did not advance			Masoumeh Ameri; Narges Ranjbar; Sepideh Sirani	Women's trap team	161	6
Narges Ranjbar	Women's trap	54	23	Did not advance			Masoumeh Ameri; Narges Ranjbar; Sepideh Sirani	Women's trap team	161	6
Sepideh Sirani	Women's trap	47	26	Did not advance			Masoumeh Ameri; Narges Ranjbar; Sepideh Sirani	Women's trap team	161	6
Masoumeh Ameri	Women's double trap	66	14	—N/a			Masoumeh Ameri; Bahareh Jahandar; Sepideh Sirani	Women's double trap team	216	4
Bahareh Jahandar	Women's double trap	78	11	—N/a			Masoumeh Ameri; Bahareh Jahandar; Sepideh Sirani	Women's double trap team	216	4
Sepideh Sirani	Women's double trap	72	12	—N/a			Masoumeh Ameri; Bahareh Jahandar; Sepideh Sirani	Women's double trap team	216	4

=== Table tennis ===
Individual

Athlete	Event	Round of 64	Round of 32	Round of 16	Quarterfinal	Semifinal	Final	Rank
Noshad Alamian	Men's singles	Bye	Wu (TPE); W 4–1 (11, 11, −9, 6, 11)	Wang (CHN); L 0–4 (−7, −6, −4, −4)	Did not advance			9
Afshin Norouzi	Men's singles	Saidov (TJK); W 4–0 (7, 5, 7, 5)	Kim (PRK); L 2–4 (6, 8, −10, −2, −9, −3)	Did not advance				17
Mohammad Reza Akhlaghpasand; Noshad Alamian	Men's doubles	—N/a	Wang and Zhang (CHN); L 0–3 (−9, −6, −6)	Did not advance				17

Team

Athlete	Event	Preliminary round				Quarterfinal	Semifinal	Final	Rank
Athlete	Event	Round 1	Round 2	Round 3	Rank	Quarterfinal	Semifinal	Final	Rank
Mohammad Reza Akhlaghpasand; Noshad Alamian; Afshin Norouzi	Men's team	Hong Kong; L 0–3 (0–3, 2–3, 0–3)	Nepal; W 3–0 (3–0, 3–0, 3–0)	Japan; L 0–3 (0–3, 2–3, 2–3)	3	Did not advance			9

=== Taekwondo ===
Athlete	Event	Round of 32	Round of 16	Quarterfinal	Semifinal	Final	Rank
Reza Naderian	Men's 63 kg	Joshi (NEP); W 10–0	Go (PHI); L 7–9	Did not advance			9
Mohammad Bagheri Motamed	Men's 68 kg	Chanteerawong (THA); W 5–1	Abulibdeh (JOR); W 2–1	Salih (QAT); W 6–2	Huang (CHN); W 8–3	Jang (KOR); W 6–4	1st place, gold medalist(s)
Alireza Nasr Azadani	Men's 74 kg	Jang (KOR); W 4–1	Li (CHN); W DSQ (6–3)	Karimov (TJK); W 10–2	Thongsalap (THA); W 5–3	Kim (UZB); W 11–2	1st place, gold medalist(s)
Farzad Abdollahi	Men's 80 kg	Bye	Baykuziyev (UZB); W 11–2	Lương (VIE); W 13–1	Bahave (AFG); L 5–9	Did not advance	3rd place, bronze medalist(s)
Yousef Karami	Men's 87 kg	—N/a	Bye	Moosa (BRN); W 7–2	Yin (CHN); W 3–1	Park (KOR); W 4–3	1st place, gold medalist(s)
Hossein Tajik	Men's +87 kg	—N/a	Al-Adhami (QAT); W WO	Chilmanov (KAZ); L 0–0	Did not advance		5
Sara Khoshjamal Fekri	Women's 46 kg	—N/a	Lei (MAC); W 6–1	Chaulagain (NEP); W 6–0	Huang (TPE); L 3–8	Did not advance	3rd place, bronze medalist(s)
Samaneh Sheshpari	Women's 53 kg	Bye	Korobko (TJK); W 6–2	Al-Tarman (JOR); W 15–6	Nguyễn (VIE); L 13–16	Did not advance	3rd place, bronze medalist(s)
Sousan Hajipour	Women's 57 kg	Bye	Alava (PHI); W 7–1	Dmitriyeva (KAZ); W 8–7	Hou (CHN); L 0–3	Did not advance	3rd place, bronze medalist(s)
Raheleh Asemani	Women's 62 kg	—N/a	Khojaeva (TJK); W 13–3	Shahi (NEP); W 5–4	Premwaew (THA); W 6–2	Noh (KOR); L 2–14	2nd place, silver medalist(s)
Parisa Farshidi	Women's 67 kg	—N/a		Bye	Aitmukhambetova (KAZ); W 4–3	Guo (CHN); L 2–4	2nd place, silver medalist(s)
Soheila Sayyahi	Women's 73 kg	—N/a		Yergeshova (KAZ); L 3–6	Did not advance		5

=== Volleyball ===
==== Beach ====
Athlete	Event	Preliminary round				Round of 16	Quarterfinal	Semifinal	Final	Rank
Athlete	Event	Round 1	Round 2	Round 3	Rank	Round of 16	Quarterfinal	Semifinal	Final	Rank
Parviz Farrokhi; Aghmohammad Salagh	Men	Al-Shereiqi and Al-Housni (OMA); W 2–0 (21–17, 21–17)	Ababacar and Abdulhabib (QAT); W 2–0 (21–14, 21–17)	Sangkhachot and Pollueang (THA); W 2–0 (21–15, 23–21)	1 Q	Naeini and Raoufi (IRI); W 2–0 (21–16, 21–10)	Yakovlev and Kuleshov (KAZ); L 0–2 (18–21, 13–21)	Did not advance		5
Reza Naeini; Rahman Raoufi	Men	Xavier and Soares (TLS); W 2–0 (21–9, 21–13)	Taing and Samath (CAM); W 2–0 (21–11, 21–13)	Gao and Li (CHN); L 0–2 (12–21, 18–21)	2 Q	Farrokhi and Salagh (IRI); L 0–2 (16–21, 10–21)	Did not advance			9

==== Indoor ====
Team	Event	Preliminary round					Second round			Quarterfinal	Semifinal	Final	Rank
Team	Event	Round 1	Round 2	Round 3	Round 4	Rank	Round 1	Round 2	Rank	Quarterfinal	Semifinal	Final	Rank
Iran	Men	Mongolia; W 3–0 (25–12, 25–9, 25–13)	Turkmenistan; W 3–0 (25–10, 25–17, 29–27)	Saudi Arabia; W 3–0 (25–20, 25–20, 27–25)	Indonesia; W 3–0 (25–15, 25–23, 25–23)	1 Q	Thailand; W 3–0 (25–17, 27–25, 25–21)	China; W 3–0 (25–17, 25–19, 27–25)	1 Q	Qatar; W 3–1 (16–25, 25–16, 25–23, 25–14)	Thailand; W 3–0 (25–16, 25–21, 25–16)	Japan; L 1–3 (19–25, 13–25, 25–23, 18–25)	2nd place, silver medalist(s)
Roster: Adel Gholami; Mojtaba Attar; Saeid Marouf; Mohammad Mousavi; Hamzeh Zarini; Alireza Nadi; Mohsen Andalib; Farhad Nazari Afshar; Mehdi Mahdavi; Arash Keshavarzi; Mohammad Mohammadkazem; Arash Kamalvand; Coach: Hossein Maadani

=== Weightlifting ===
Athlete	Event	Snatch		Clean & Jerk		Total	
Athlete	Event	Result	Rank	Result	Rank	Result	Rank
Mehdi Panzvan	Men's 69 kg	147	1	173	4	320	4
Morteza Rezaeian	Men's 69 kg	147	2	177	3	324	2nd place, silver medalist(s)
Kianoush Rostami	Men's 85 kg	165	5	200	6	365	6
Yaser Dadvand	Men's 94 kg	165	8	192	9	357	9
Asghar Ebrahimi	Men's 94 kg	183	1	210	3	393	2nd place, silver medalist(s)
Hamed Majidi	Men's 105 kg	NM	—	—	—	—	—
Sajjad Anoushiravani	Men's +105 kg	195	2	232	3	427	3rd place, bronze medalist(s)
Behdad Salimi	Men's +105 kg	205 GR	1	235	2	440	1st place, gold medalist(s)

=== Wrestling ===
Freestyle

Athlete	Event	Round of 32	Round of 16	Quarterfinal	Semifinal	Final	Rank
Hassan Rahimi	Men's 55 kg	—N/a	Rejepow (TKM); W 2–1 (2–0, 1–2, 1–0)	Mansurov (UZB); L 0–2 (0–2, 0–1)	Repechage; Al-Yamani (YEM); W 2–0 (5–0, 5–0)	3rd place match Kim (KOR); L 1–2 (1–0, 0–1, 0–4)	5
Saeid Ahmadi	Men's 60 kg	Bye	Mandakhnaran (MGL); L 1–2 (1–3, 4–1, 0–2)	Did not advance	Repechage; Farhan (YEM); W 2–0 (7–0, 7–0)	3rd place match Gao (CHN); L 1–2 (1–0, 1–4, 0–2)	5
Mehdi Taghavi	Men's 66 kg	—N/a	Spiridonov (KAZ); W 2–1 (0–2, 1–0, 2–0)	Shan (CHN); W 2–0 (3–1, 4–0)	Navruzov (UZB); W 2–0 (2–0, 2–0)	Yonemitsu (JPN); L 0–2 (0–1, 1–2)	2nd place, silver medalist(s)
Sadegh Goudarzi	Men's 74 kg	—N/a	Fahriansyah (INA); W 2–0 (4–0, 7–0)	Dzhakypbekov (KGZ); W 2–0 (3–0, 4–0)	Lee (KOR); W 2–0 (9–2, 3–0)	Nagashima (JPN); W 2–0 (1–0, 3–0)	1st place, gold medalist(s)
Jamal Mirzaei	Men's 84 kg	—N/a	Bekdurdiýew (TKM); W 2–0 (7–0, 6–0)	Al-Khayat (SYR); W 2–0 (7–0, 7–0)	Baiduashov (KAZ); W 2–0 (5–0, 1–0)	Lee (KOR); W 2–0 (1–0, 6–0)	1st place, gold medalist(s)
Reza Yazdani	Men's 96 kg	—N/a	Al-Karrad (SYR); W 2–0 (1–0, 6–0)	Tigiyev (KAZ); W DSQ (4–1, 5–1)	Kim (KOR); W 2–0 (1–0, 4–0)	Kurbanov (UZB); W 2–1 (1–3, 3–0, 6–4)	1st place, gold medalist(s)
Fardin Masoumi	Men's 120 kg	—N/a	Taymazov (UZB); L 0–2 (0–1, 0–3)	Did not advance	Repechage; Lazarev (KGZ); W 2–0 (8–2, 3–0)	3rd place match Katayev (KAZ); W Ret (1–1, 1–1)	3rd place, bronze medalist(s)

Greco-Roman

Athlete	Event	Round of 16	Quarterfinal	Semifinal	Final	Rank
Hamid Sourian	Men's 55 kg	Choi (KOR); W 2–1 (0–1, 3–0, 5–0)	Yun (PRK); W 2–0 (6–0, 5–0)	Hasegawa (JPN); L 1–2 (0–1, 2–0, 0–1)	3rd place match Karishalov (KAZ); L 0–2 (0–3, 0–1)	5
Omid Norouzi	Men's 60 kg	Matsumoto (JPN); W 2–0 (6–0, 2–0)	Xie (CHN); W 2–0 (3–0, 3–0)	Jumashev (UZB); W 2–1 (1–0, 0–2, 1–0)	Jung (KOR); W 2–1 (0–3, 2–0, 2–0)	1st place, gold medalist(s)
Saeid Abdevali	Men's 66 kg	Bye	Oomchompoo (THA); W 2–0 (5–0, 3–0)	Rana (IND); W 2–0 (4–0, 1–0)	Bayakhmetov (KAZ); W 2–1 (0–1, 3–0, 4–0)	1st place, gold medalist(s)
Farshad Alizadeh	Men's 74 kg	Tsurumaki (JPN); L 1–2 (0–3, 2–0, 1–3)	Did not advance	Repechage; Karimov (TJK); W 2–0 (2–0, 1–0)	3rd place match Murodov (UZB); W 2–1 (0–2, 1–0, 1–0)	3rd place, bronze medalist(s)
Taleb Nematpour	Men's 84 kg	Khan (QAT); W 2–0 (1–0, 1–0)	Kenjeev (KGZ); W 2–1 (0–1, 2–0, 1–0)	Kumar (IND); W 2–0 (1–0, 1–0)	Lee (KOR); W 2–0 (1–0, 2–0)	1st place, gold medalist(s)
Babak Ghorbani	Men's 96 kg	Abdulloev (TJK); W 2–0 (5–0, 1–0)	Saldadze (UZB); W 2–1 (1–0, 0–1, 2–0)	Erkimbaev (KGZ); W 2–0 (1–0, 2–0)	Mambetov (KAZ); W 2–1 (0–2, 1–0, 3–0)	1st place, gold medalist(s)
Amir Aliakbari	Men's 120 kg	Ramonov (KGZ); W 2–0 (1–0, 2–0)	Nadhim (IRQ); W 2–0 (1–0, 1–0)	Tinaliyev (KAZ); L 1–2 (0–1, 1–0, 0–1), DSQ	Did not advance	—

=== Wushu ===
Taolu

Athlete	Event	Round 1			Round 2			Total	Rank
Athlete	Event	Form	Score	Rank	Form	Score	Rank	Total	Rank
Mehdi Ghobadi	Men's changquan	—N/a						9.15	10
Ehsan Peighambari	Men's changquan	—N/a						9.70	3rd place, bronze medalist(s)
Farshad Arabi	Men's nanquan & nangun	Nanquan	9.72	2	Nangun	9.50	8	19.22	6

Sanshou

Athlete	Event	Round of 16	Quarterfinal	Semifinal	Final	Rank
Mohsen Mohammadseifi	Men's 60 kg	Sukamto (INA); W 2–0	Tharu (NEP); W 2–0	Singh (IND); W 2–0	Kim (KOR); W 2–0	1st place, gold medalist(s)
Javad Aghaei	Men's 65 kg	Abeyrathna (SRI); W AV	Eddiva (PHI); L AV	Did not advance		5
Sajjad Abbasi	Men's 70 kg	Khalid (PAK); W 2–0	Chou (TPE); W 2–0	Zhang (CHN); L 0–2	Did not advance	3rd place, bronze medalist(s)
Hamid Reza Gholipour	Men's 75 kg	Kumar (IND); W 2–0	Lee (MAS); W 2–0	Jiang (CHN); W 2–1	Ahmed (PAK); W 2–0	1st place, gold medalist(s)
Elaheh Mansourian	Women's 52 kg	Oriya (AFG); W KO	Estimar (PHI); W 2–0	Nguyễn (VIE); L 0–2	Did not advance	3rd place, bronze medalist(s)
Khadijeh Azadpour	Women's 60 kg	Noh (KOR); W 2–0	Tân (VIE); W 2–0	Wu (TPE); W 2–0	Devi (IND); W 2–0	1st place, gold medalist(s)
