= Karate at the 2010 Asian Games – Men's kumite +84 kg =

Karate competition

Men's kumite +84 kg at the 2010 Asian Games
- Venue: Guangdong Gymnasium
- Date: 24 November 2010
- Competitors: 12 from 12 nations

Medalists
gold medal	Zabihollah Pourshab	Iran
silver medal	Umar Syarief	Indonesia
bronze medal	Lei Kuong Cheong	Macau
bronze medal	Khalid Khalidov	Kazakhstan

The men's kumite +84 kilograms competition at the 2010 Asian Games in Guangzhou, China was held on 24 November 2010 at the Guangdong Gymnasium.

== Schedule ==
All times are China Standard Time (UTC+08:00)

Date	Time	Event
Wednesday, 24 November 2010	13:00	1/8 finals
Wednesday, 24 November 2010	13:00	Quarterfinals
Wednesday, 24 November 2010	13:00	Semifinals
Wednesday, 24 November 2010	13:00	Bronze medal match
Wednesday, 24 November 2010	16:00	Final

== Results ==
Legend

- H — Won by hansoku

=== Main bracket ===
1/8 finals
Rustam Ashurov (UZB)	1
Khamis Juma Al-Aswad (UAE)	0
Lei Kuong Cheong (MAC)	5
Kim Rak-won (KOR)	2
Borhan Bakri (PLE)	0
Ahmad Muneer (IOC)	2
Amer Abu Afifeh (JOR)	2
Raid Hawsawi (KSA)	1

Quarterfinals
Li Peng (CHN)	0
Rustam Ashurov (UZB)	0
Lei Kuong Cheong (MAC)	0
Umar Syarief (INA)	5^{H}
Zabihollah Pourshab (IRI)	2
Ahmad Muneer (IOC)	0
Amer Abu Afifeh (JOR)	2
Khalid Khalidov (KAZ)	3

Semifinals
Li Peng (CHN)	0
Umar Syarief (INA)	3
Zabihollah Pourshab (IRI)	2
Khalid Khalidov (KAZ)	0

Final
Umar Syarief (INA)	3
Zabihollah Pourshab (IRI)	7

=== Repechage ===
Bronze medal match
Lei Kuong Cheong (MAC)	0
Li Peng (CHN)	0
Ahmad Muneer (IOC)	1
Khalid Khalidov (KAZ)	6
