= Karate at the 2010 Asian Games – Men's kumite 84 kg =

Karate competition

Men's kumite 84 kg at the 2010 Asian Games
- Venue: Guangdong Gymnasium
- Date: 26 November 2010
- Competitors: 17 from 17 nations

Medalists
gold medal	Jasem Vishkaei	Iran
silver medal	Ryutaro Araga	Japan
bronze medal	Yen Tzu-yao	Chinese Taipei
bronze medal	Mutasembellah Khair	Jordan

The men's kumite 84 kilograms competition at the 2010 Asian Games in Guangzhou, China was held on 26 November 2010 at the Guangdong Gymnasium.

== Schedule ==
All times are China Standard Time (UTC+08:00)

Date	Time	Event
Friday, 26 November 2010	14:00	1/16 finals
Friday, 26 November 2010	14:00	1/8 finals
Friday, 26 November 2010	14:00	Quarterfinals
Friday, 26 November 2010	14:00	Semifinals
Friday, 26 November 2010	14:00	Repechage 2
Friday, 26 November 2010	14:00	Bronze medal match
Friday, 26 November 2010	14:00	Final

== Results ==
=== Main bracket ===
==== Final ====
Final
Ryutaro Araga (JPN)	2
Jasem Vishkaei (IRI)	6

==== Top half ====
1/16 finals
Hussin Ali Rezayee (AFG)	0
Yen Tzu-yao (TPE)	4

1/8 finals
Majed Al-Khalifah (KSA)	0
Yen Tzu-yao (TPE)	4
Ahmed Al-Raee (PLE)	1
Ryutaro Araga (JPN)	6
Badriddin Umedov (TJK)	2
Sengpheng Duangvilai (LAO)	1
Xu Xiangwu (CHN)	6
Sunil Rathi (IND)	1

Quarterfinals
Yen Tzu-yao (TPE)	0
Ryutaro Araga (JPN)	2
Badriddin Umedov (TJK)	1
Xu Xiangwu (CHN)	3

Semifinals
Ryutaro Araga (JPN)	2
Xu Xiangwu (CHN)	1

==== Bottom half ====
1/16 finals

1/8 finals
Hatta Mahamut (MAS)	9
Jamil Hj Abd Hamid (BRU)	1
Mutasembellah Khair (JOR)	2
Jasem Vishkaei (IRI)	6
Kolnadar Karim (IRQ)	0
Jang Min-soo (KOR)	2
Younis Al-Aaraj (QAT)	8
Dmitrii Kazanov (KGZ)	0

Quarterfinals
Hatta Mahamut (MAS)	1
Jasem Vishkaei (IRI)	2
Jang Min-soo (KOR)	4
Younis Al-Aaraj (QAT)	1

Semifinals
Jasem Vishkaei (IRI)	2
Jang Min-soo (KOR)	0

=== Repechage ===
Repechage 2
Ahmed Al-Raee (PLE)	1
Yen Tzu-yao (TPE)	4
Mutasembellah Khair (JOR)	6
Hatta Mahamut (MAS)	0

Bronze medal match
Yen Tzu-yao (TPE)	7
Xu Xiangwu (CHN)	1
Mutasembellah Khair (JOR)	9
Jang Min-soo (KOR)	3
