= Taekwondo at the 2010 Asian Games – Men's 87 kg =

Taekwondo competition

Men's 87 kg at the 2010 Asian Games
- Venue: Guangdong Gymnasium
- Date: 17 November 2010
- Competitors: 11 from 11 nations

Medalists
gold medal	Yousef Karami	Iran
silver medal	Park Yong-hyun	South Korea
bronze medal	Yin Zhimeng	China
bronze medal	Nguyễn Trọng Cường	Vietnam

The men's middleweight (−87 kilograms) event at the 2010 Asian Games took place on 17 November 2010 at Guangdong Gymnasium, Guangzhou, China.

A total of eleven competitors from eleven countries competed in this event, limited to fighters whose body weight was less than 87 kilograms.

The defending champion Yousef Karami of Iran won the gold medal after beating Park Yong-hyun of South Korea in gold medal match 4–3, He beat athletes from Bahrain and China before reaching the final. The bronze medal was shared by Yin Zhimeng of China and Nguyễn Trọng Cường from Vietnam.

Athletes from Jordan, Bahrain, Indonesia and Lebanon shared the fifth place.

== Schedule ==
All times are China Standard Time (UTC+08:00)

Date	Time	Event
Wednesday, 17 November 2010	09:00	1/8 finals
Wednesday, 17 November 2010	14:00	Quarterfinals
Wednesday, 17 November 2010	14:00	Semifinals
Wednesday, 17 November 2010	16:30	Final

== Results ==
1/8 finals
Sonam Penjor (BHU)	0
Yin Zhimeng (CHN)	8
Gayan Kumara (SRI)	2
Yazan Al-Sadeq (JOR)	13
Jad Moussalli (LIB)	4
Mohammed Kahla (PLE)	1

Quarterfinals
Rizal Samsir (INA)	1
Yin Zhimeng (CHN)	11
Yousef Karami (IRI)	7
Abdulkarim Moosa (BRN)	2
Park Yong-hyun (KOR)	7
Yazan Al-Sadeq (JOR)	1
Jad Moussalli (LIB)	1
Nguyễn Trọng Cường (VIE)	2

Semifinals
Yin Zhimeng (CHN)	1
Yousef Karami (IRI)	3
Park Yong-hyun (KOR)	17
Nguyễn Trọng Cường (VIE)	2

Final
Yousef Karami (IRI)	4
Park Yong-hyun (KOR)	3
