= Wrestling at the 2010 Asian Games – Men's Greco-Roman 96 kg =

Men's Greco-Roman 96 kg at the 2010 Asian Games
- Venue: Huagong Gymnasium
- Date: 22 November 2010
- Competitors: 12 from 12 nations

Medalists
gold medal	Babak Ghorbani	Iran
silver medal	Asset Mambetov	Kazakhstan
bronze medal	An Chang-gun	South Korea
bronze medal	Davyd Saldadze	Uzbekistan

The men's Greco-Roman 96 kilograms wrestling competition at the 2010 Asian Games in Guangzhou was held on 22 November 2010 at the Huagong Gymnasium.

This Greco-Roman wrestling competition consisted of a single-elimination tournament, with a repechage used to determine the winner of two bronze medals. The two finalists faced off for gold and silver medals. Each wrestler who lost to one of the two finalists moved into the repechage, culminating in a pair of bronze medal matches featuring the semifinal losers each facing the remaining repechage opponent from their half of the bracket.

Each bout consisted of up to three rounds, lasting two minutes apiece. The wrestler who scored more points in each round was the winner of that rounds; the bout finished when one wrestler had won two rounds (and thus the match).

== Schedule ==
All times are China Standard Time (UTC+08:00)

Date	Time	Event
Monday, 22 November 2010	09:30	1/8 finals
Monday, 22 November 2010	09:30	Quarterfinals
Monday, 22 November 2010	09:30	Semifinals
Monday, 22 November 2010	16:00	Repechages
Monday, 22 November 2010	17:00	Finals

== Results ==
Legend

- F — Won by fall

=== Main bracket ===
1/8 finals
Katsuya Kitamura (JPN)	0	1	1
Arslan Saparmämmedow (TKM)	1	0	0
Anil Kumar (IND)	0	0
Azamat Erkimbaev (KGZ)	1	2
Davyd Saldadze (UZB)	3	5
Zhai Ningchao (CHN)	1	0
Babak Ghorbani (IRI)	5	1
Khabibullo Abdulloev (TJK)	0	0

Quarterfinals
Asset Mambetov (KAZ)	2	1
An Chang-gun (KOR)	0	0
Yahia Abutabeekh (JOR)	6^{F}
Mamoun Karama (PLE)	0
Katsuya Kitamura (JPN)	0	0
Azamat Erkimbaev (KGZ)	1	3
Davyd Saldadze (UZB)	0	1	0
Babak Ghorbani (IRI)	1	0	2

Semifinals
Asset Mambetov (KAZ)	3	1
Yahia Abutabeekh (JOR)	0	0
Azamat Erkimbaev (KGZ)	0	0
Babak Ghorbani (IRI)	1	2

Final
Asset Mambetov (KAZ)	2	0	0
Babak Ghorbani (IRI)	0	1	3

=== Repechage ===
Repechage round 1
Khabibullo Abdulloev (TJK)	0	0
Davyd Saldadze (UZB)	3	3

Bronze medals
An Chang-gun (KOR)	2	1
Yahia Abutabeekh (JOR)	0	0
Davyd Saldadze (UZB)	2	1
Azamat Erkimbaev (KGZ)	0	0

== Final standing ==
Rank	Athlete
1st place, gold medalist(s)	Babak Ghorbani (IRI)
2nd place, silver medalist(s)	Asset Mambetov (KAZ)
3rd place, bronze medalist(s)	An Chang-gun (KOR)
3rd place, bronze medalist(s)	Davyd Saldadze (UZB)
5	Yahia Abutabeekh (JOR)
5	Azamat Erkimbaev (KGZ)
7	Katsuya Kitamura (JPN)
8	Arslan Saparmämmedow (TKM)
9	Zhai Ningchao (CHN)
10	Anil Kumar (IND)
11	Mamoun Karama (PLE)
12	Khabibullo Abdulloev (TJK)
