= Taekwondo at the 2010 Asian Games – Men's 74 kg =

Taekwondo competition

Men's 74 kg at the 2010 Asian Games
- Venue: Guangdong Gymnasium
- Date: 17 November 2010
- Competitors: 22 from 22 nations

Medalists
gold medal	Alireza Nasr Azadani	Iran
silver medal	Dmitriy Kim	Uzbekistan
bronze medal	Dương Thanh Tâm	Vietnam
bronze medal	Patiwat Thongsalap	Thailand

The men's lightweight (−74 kilograms) event at the 2010 Asian Games took place on 17 November 2010 at Guangdong Gymnasium, Guangzhou, China.

== Schedule ==
All times are China Standard Time (UTC+08:00)

Date	Time	Event
Wednesday, 17 November 2010	09:00	1/16 finals
Wednesday, 17 November 2010	09:00	1/8 finals
Wednesday, 17 November 2010	14:00	Quarterfinals
Wednesday, 17 November 2010	14:00	Semifinals
Wednesday, 17 November 2010	16:30	Final

== Results ==
Legend

- DQ — Won by disqualification

=== Final ===
Final
Dmitriy Kim (UZB)	2
Alireza Nasr Azadani (IRI)	11

=== Top half ===
1/16 finals
Dmitriy Kim (UZB)	6
Sultan Al-Mutairi (IOC)	5
Sawatvilay Phimmasone (LAO)	7
Jaswant Singh (IND)	9
Lai Ting-chin (TPE)	3
Dương Thanh Tâm (VIE)	4

1/8 finals
Aibar Dyussebayev (KAZ)	3
Dmitriy Kim (UZB)	4
Ahmed Maher Saad (QAT)	6
Ahmed Ali (PLE)	4
Yulius Fernando (INA)	6
Jaswant Singh (IND)	5
Dương Thanh Tâm (VIE)	1
Tarek Makdessi (LIB)	0

Quarterfinals
Dmitriy Kim (UZB)	7
Ahmed Maher Saad (QAT)	6
Yulius Fernando (INA)	5
Dương Thanh Tâm (VIE)	6

Semifinals
Dmitriy Kim (UZB)	5
Dương Thanh Tâm (VIE)	1

=== Bottom half ===
1/16 finals
Abas Hussaini (AFG)	1
Shakhriyor Karimov (TJK)	4
Alireza Nasr Azadani (IRI)	4
Jang Kyeong-hun (KOR)	1
Dan Bahadur Aire (NEP)	DQ
Manuel Nascimento (TLS)

1/8 finals
Abdullah Al-Qadasi (YEM)	3
Shakhriyor Karimov (TJK)	5
Alireza Nasr Azadani (IRI)	6^{DQ}
Li Lai (CHN)	3
Patiwat Thongsalap (THA)	8
Kusung Wangdi (BHU)	3
Dan Bahadur Aire (NEP)	5
Samuel Morrison (PHI)	15

Quarterfinals
Shakhriyor Karimov (TJK)	2
Alireza Nasr Azadani (IRI)	10
Patiwat Thongsalap (THA)	20
Samuel Morrison (PHI)	11

Semifinals
Alireza Nasr Azadani (IRI)	5
Patiwat Thongsalap (THA)	3
