= Wushu at the 2010 Asian Games – Men's sanshou 60 kg =

Men's sanshou 60 kg at the 2010 Asian Games
- Venue: Nansha Gymnasium
- Dates: 14–17 November 2010
- Competitors: 16 from 16 nations

Medalists
gold medal	Mohsen Mohammadseifi	Iran
silver medal	Kim Jun-yul	South Korea
bronze medal	M. Bimoljit Singh	India
bronze medal	Nguyễn Minh Thông	Vietnam

The men's sanshou 60 kilograms competition at the 2010 Asian Games in Guangzhou, China was held from 14 November to 17 November at the Nansha Gymnasium.

A total of sixteen competitors from sixteen countries competed in this event, limited to fighters whose body weight was less than 60 kilograms.

Mohsen Mohammadseifi from Iran won the gold medal after beating Kim Jun-yul of South Korea in gold medal bout 2–0, Mohammadseifi won the first period 5–0 and finished the match in 2nd period by two fall-offs. The bronze medal was shared by M. Bimoljit Singh from India and Nguyễn Minh Thông of Vietnam.

Athletes from Laos, Nepal, Mongolia and Kyrgyzstan shared the fifth place.

== Schedule ==
All times are China Standard Time (UTC+08:00)

Date	Time	Event
Sunday, 14 November 2010	19:30	Round of 16
Monday, 15 November 2010	19:30	Quarterfinals
Tuesday, 16 November 2010	19:30	Semifinals
Wednesday, 17 November 2010	19:30	Final

== Results ==
Legend

- AV — Absolute victory
- KO — Won by knockout

Round of 16
M. Bimoljit Singh (IND)	AV
Maratab Ali Shah (PAK)
Supachai Laorueang (THA)
Bouapha Valasith (LAO)	AV
Mohsen Mohammadseifi (IRI)	2
Rahmat Junaidi Sukamto (INA)	0
Amirshah Amiri (AFG)	0
Mangal Prasad Tharu (NEP)	2
Joseph Kamel (LIB)	1
Ölziibadrakhyn Saruul-Od (MGL)	2
Nguyễn Minh Thông (VIE)	2
Lei In Lam (MAC)	0
Aleksey Fedoseev (KGZ)	2
Berdimurad Kulhanow (TKM)	0
Adham Azzam (JOR)	0
Kim Jun-yul (KOR)	2

Quarterfinals
M. Bimoljit Singh (IND)	KO
Bouapha Valasith (LAO)
Mohsen Mohammadseifi (IRI)	2
Mangal Prasad Tharu (NEP)	0
Ölziibadrakhyn Saruul-Od (MGL)	0
Nguyễn Minh Thông (VIE)	2
Aleksey Fedoseev (KGZ)	1
Kim Jun-yul (KOR)	2

Semifinals
M. Bimoljit Singh (IND)	0
Mohsen Mohammadseifi (IRI)	2
Nguyễn Minh Thông (VIE)	0
Kim Jun-yul (KOR)	2

Final
Mohsen Mohammadseifi (IRI)	2
Kim Jun-yul (KOR)	0
