= Dragon boat at the 2010 Asian Games – Men's 500 metres =

Men's 500 metres at the 2010 Asian Games
- Venue: Zengcheng Dragon Boat Lake
- Date: 19 November 2010
- Competitors: 263 from 11 nations

Medalists
gold medal	Indonesia
silver medal	Myanmar
bronze medal	China

The men's 500 metres competition at the 2010 Asian Games in Guangzhou was held on 19 November 2010 at the Zengcheng Dragon Boat Lake.

== Schedule ==
All times are China Standard Time (UTC+08:00)

Date	Time	Event
Friday, 19 November 2010	09:00	Heats
Friday, 19 November 2010	09:50	Repechages
Friday, 19 November 2010	10:40	Finals

== Squads ==
China	Chinese Taipei	Hong Kong	Indonesia
Guan Xiangting; Hu Jiaoxin; Huang Chentao; Ji Pinghe; Liang Xianqi; Liu Peisong; Liu Yaosen; Luo Juncheng; Ou Shuangan; Pan Huijun; Pan Zhanquan; Su Bopin; Su Boyuan; Tan Shichao; Tan Shipeng; Wei Le; Wu Guochong; Wu Jiexiong; Wu Jinxiong; Zeng Runfa; Zhou Dezi; Zhou Qizhi; Zhou Xingqiang	Chang Cheng-yu; Chen Chou Tsung-ju; Chen Kuo-ming; Chen Liang-wei; Chen Yen-ting; Cheng Chung-kai; Chia Chun-han; Chiu Chih-hsien; Chiu Ping-jui; Chiu Tai-yuan; Chou Chih-wei; Chou Pi-chieh; Huang Wei-guo; Ku Kai-wun; Lin Cheng; Lin Min-hao; Lin Sheng-ru; Lin Ya-she; Lo Hsuan-te; Lu Fang-hsien; Pan Yi-hsiung; Sung Cheng-lin; Wu Chun-chieh; Wu Shao-wei	Jacky Chan; Chan Wai Ping; Cheung Kwok Pan; Chu Wai Ho; Chung Wai Kit; Fan Koon Shing; Fan Tsz Ho; Fung Wan Him; Chris Ho; Lau Chin Ho; Lau Kin; Alfred Leung; Leung Sau Ching; Leung Tsan; Li Ka Moon; Li Yun Kuen; Lui Kam Chi; Mok Hoi Pang; So Man Kat; Tang Kai Yin; Sam Tsang; Wong Wai Keung; Wong Yiu Cheong; Wu Yiu Chun	Ajurahman; Alkarmani; Arifriyadi; Asnawir; Abdul Azis; Asep Hidayat; Iwan Husin; Jaslin; Marjuki; John Feter Matulessy; Spens Stuber Mehue; Erwin David Monim; Muchlis; Eka Octarianus; Pendrota Putra Kusuma; Ikhwan Randi; Didin Rusdiana; Silo; Japerry Siregar; Andri Sugiarto; Ahmad Supriadi; Dedi Kurniawan Suyatno; Syarifuddin; Anwar Tarra
Iran	Japan	Macau	Myanmar
Meisam Abbasi; Ali Alipour; Reza Bahraei; Jafar Boroumand; Mohammad Reza Dadashi; Hadi Daryaeinejad; Salman Fathinia; Sajjad Gharibi; Mohsen Ghofrani; Vahid Hajizadeh; Milad Hassanzadi; Salar Kaboutari; Mehdi Khabbaz Kohan; Abolghasem Mazloumi; Mehdi Mehri; Arshid Nasseri; Abdolmajid Rasouli; Mohammad Reza Rezaei; Pejman Sadraei; Pouyan Sadraei; Rouhollah Salehian; Sajjad Soleimani; Omid Soleimani; Mohammad Zebarpour	Kazuhisa Aguro; Hiroki Azuma; Masaki Chihara; Ryosuke Doi; Kazuhiro Fujii; Tatsuya Fujimoto; Akira Fujiwara; Shota Higashi; Yuto Hirayama; Hideyuki Ikeda; Hiroyuki Innami; Takeshi Inque; Daisuke Kinoshita; Ryuji Kishimoto; Tetsuya Kishimoto; Hiromitsu Kono; Takamasa Matsuno; Kunihiko Nakano; Masayuki Shoji; Moriaki Sumita; Yuya Suzuki; Yuki Urakawa; Hiroshi Yamamoto; Satoshi Yamamoto	Chan In Fei; Chang Wa Ieng; Cheang Man Hou; Cheang Weng Mou; Chong Chon Wa; Chou Chi Man; Kam Chi Weng; Kou Pei Tak; Kwan Chi Wai; Lam Io Sang; Lei Kin Chong; Leong Kin Pong; Leong Wai Kit; Ng Chi Kin; Ng Kam Hong; Sin Iao Kan; Tang Hou Cheong; U Chon Meng; Wong Chan Hong; Wong Chong Seng; Wong Hon Chio; Wong Wai Ip; Wu Ka Io; Wu Ngou Teng	Kyaw Thu Aung; Than Aung; Win Htut Aung; Aung Zaw Aye; Win Htike; Kyaw Myo Khaing; Aung Ko; Naing Lin; Tun Tun Lin; Aung Ko Min; Zaw Min; Khin Maung Myint; Zaw Naing; Yan Paing; Saw Khay Sha; Aung Lwin Soe; Kyaw Soe; Ye Aung Soe; Kyaw Lin Tun; Shwe Hla Win; Thaung Win; Min Min Zaw; Myo Zaw; Naing Naing Zaw
Singapore	South Korea	Thailand	
Ang Chin Leng; Glenn Chan; Chia Yi Liang; Chua Kwee Hong; Jonathan Gan; Gan Choon Kiat; Kieu Chin Wah; Alvan Lim; Liu Hou Cheng; Luo Weining; Mokmin Faizal; Ng Choon Chek; Ashley Ong; Terence Ong; Andrew Sim; Siu Jun Yang; Tan Chun Leng; Derick Tan; Jerry Tan; Raymond Tan; Jeffrey Tan; Jeffrey Tan; Wong Kah Shawn; Yeo Chin Hwei	Byeon Hong-kyun; Gu Ja-uk; Hyun Jae-chan; Jeong Seung-gyun; Kim Chang-soo; Kim Hyun-soo; Kim Seon-ho; Kim Yong-hyun; Kim Yu-ho; Lee Byung-tak; Lee Hyun-woo; Lee Seong-won; Lee Suk-hwan; Oh Byung-hoon; Oh Joong-dae; Park Ho-gi; Park Jeong-hoon; Park Jeong-keun; Park Min-ho; Shim Dae-seop; Shin Heon-sub; Shin Yun-gyu; Song Myeong-chan; Yang Byung-doo	Surachai Anun; Winai Arino; Suriya Butnongwa; Paiboon Chanpram; Suthumarat Chengcharoen; Chaiyakarn Choochuen; Manit Haisok; Santas Mingwongyang; Thunyaboon Nasok; Thotsaporn Pholseth; Samart Pimharn; Amnat Pinthong; Anuchit Promdonkloy; Montean Pudchakieo; Yutthapong Ruangjan; Vinya Seechomchuen; Somsong Suebsingkan; Gunyakorn Tawa; Jakkapong Thomjoho; Chayun Tuejaima; Bamrung Udompan; Ekkapong Wongunjai; Wuttikrai Wongupparee; Piyapong Wootti	

== Results ==
=== Heats ===
- Qualification: 1 + Next best time → Grand final (GF), Rest → Repechage (R)

==== Heat 1 ====
Rank	Team	Time	Notes
1	China	1:44.053	GF
2	Myanmar	1:44.263	GF
3	Thailand	1:48.493	R
4	South Korea	1:49.261	R
5	Chinese Taipei	1:49.987	R
6	Japan	1:50.467	R

==== Heat 2 ====
Rank	Team	Time	Notes
1	Indonesia	1:45.897	GF
2	Iran	1:49.119	R
3	Macau	1:52.749	R
4	Singapore	1:53.121	R
5	Hong Kong	2:05.565	R

=== Repechages ===
- Qualification: 1 + Next best time → Grand final (GF), Rest → Minnor final (MF)

==== Repechage 1 ====
Rank	Team	Time	Notes
1	South Korea	1:47.271	GF
2	Thailand	1:47.883	GF
3	Japan	1:49.551	MF
4	Singapore	1:55.539	MF

==== Repechage 2 ====
Rank	Team	Time	Notes
1	Chinese Taipei	1:50.195	GF
2	Iran	1:52.199	MF
3	Macau	1:54.857	MF
4	Hong Kong	1:58.223	MF

=== Finals ===
==== Minor final ====
Rank	Team	Time
1	Japan	1:51.611
2	Iran	1:51.791
3	Macau	1:53.885
4	Singapore	1:54.473
5	Hong Kong	1:57.119

==== Grand final ====
Rank	Team	Time
1st place, gold medalist(s)	Indonesia	1:44.506
2nd place, silver medalist(s)	Myanmar	1:45.622
3rd place, bronze medalist(s)	China	1:46.480
4	South Korea	1:48.142
5	Chinese Taipei	1:48.532
6	Thailand	1:51.040
