= Dragon boat at the 2010 Asian Games – Men's 250 metres =

Men's 250 metres at the 2010 Asian Games
- Venue: Zengcheng Dragon Boat Lake
- Date: 20 November 2010
- Competitors: 263 from 11 nations

Medalists
| gold medal | Indonesia |
| silver medal | Myanmar |
| bronze medal | China |

The men's 250 metres competition at the 2010 Asian Games in Guangzhou was held on 20 November 2010 at the Zengcheng Dragon Boat Lake.

== Schedule ==
All times are China Standard Time (UTC+08:00)

| Date | Time | Event |
|---|---|---|
| Saturday, 20 November 2010 | 09:00 | Heats |
| Saturday, 20 November 2010 | 09:40 | Repechages |
| Saturday, 20 November 2010 | 10:20 | Finals |

== Squads ==
| China | Chinese Taipei | Hong Kong | Indonesia |
|---|---|---|---|
| Guan Xiangting; Hu Jiaoxin; Huang Chentao; Ji Pinghe; Liang Xianqi; Liu Peisong; Liu Yaosen; Luo Juncheng; Ou Shuangan; Pan Huijun; Pan Zhanquan; Su Bopin; Su Boyuan; Tan Shichao; Tan Shipeng; Wei Le; Wu Guochong; Wu Jiexiong; Wu Jinxiong; Zeng Runfa; Zhou Dezi; Zhou Qizhi; Zhou Xingqiang | Chang Cheng-yu; Chen Chou Tsung-ju; Chen Kuo-ming; Chen Liang-wei; Chen Yen-ting; Cheng Chung-kai; Chia Chun-han; Chiu Chih-hsien; Chiu Ping-jui; Chiu Tai-yuan; Chou Chih-wei; Chou Pi-chieh; Huang Wei-guo; Ku Kai-wun; Lin Cheng; Lin Min-hao; Lin Sheng-ru; Lin Ya-she; Lo Hsuan-te; Lu Fang-hsien; Pan Yi-hsiung; Sung Cheng-lin; Wu Chun-chieh; Wu Shao-wei | Jacky Chan; Chan Wai Ping; Cheung Kwok Pan; Chu Wai Ho; Chung Wai Kit; Fan Koon Shing; Fan Tsz Ho; Fung Wan Him; Chris Ho; Lau Chin Ho; Lau Kin; Alfred Leung; Leung Sau Ching; Leung Tsan; Li Ka Moon; Li Yun Kuen; Lui Kam Chi; Mok Hoi Pang; So Man Kat; Tang Kai Yin; Sam Tsang; Wong Wai Keung; Wong Yiu Cheong; Wu Yiu Chun | Ajurahman; Alkarmani; Arifriyadi; Asnawir; Abdul Azis; Asep Hidayat; Iwan Husin; Jaslin; Marjuki; John Feter Matulessy; Spens Stuber Mehue; Erwin David Monim; Muchlis; Eka Octarianus; Pendrota Putra Kusuma; Ikhwan Randi; Didin Rusdiana; Silo; Japerry Siregar; Andri Sugiarto; Ahmad Supriadi; Dedi Kurniawan Suyatno; Syarifuddin; Anwar Tarra |
| Iran | Japan | Macau | Myanmar |
| Meisam Abbasi; Ali Alipour; Reza Bahraei; Jafar Boroumand; Mohammad Reza Dadashi; Hadi Daryaeinejad; Salman Fathinia; Sajjad Gharibi; Mohsen Ghofrani; Vahid Hajizadeh; Milad Hassanzadi; Salar Kaboutari; Mehdi Khabbaz Kohan; Abolghasem Mazloumi; Mehdi Mehri; Arshid Nasseri; Abdolmajid Rasouli; Mohammad Reza Rezaei; Pejman Sadraei; Pouyan Sadraei; Rouhollah Salehian; Sajjad Soleimani; Omid Soleimani; Mohammad Zebarpour | Kazuhisa Aguro; Hiroki Azuma; Masaki Chihara; Ryosuke Doi; Kazuhiro Fujii; Tatsuya Fujimoto; Akira Fujiwara; Shota Higashi; Yuto Hirayama; Hideyuki Ikeda; Hiroyuki Innami; Takeshi Inque; Daisuke Kinoshita; Ryuji Kishimoto; Tetsuya Kishimoto; Hiromitsu Kono; Takamasa Matsuno; Kunihiko Nakano; Masayuki Shoji; Moriaki Sumita; Yuya Suzuki; Yuki Urakawa; Hiroshi Yamamoto; Satoshi Yamamoto | Chan In Fei; Chang Wa Ieng; Cheang Man Hou; Cheang Weng Mou; Chong Chon Wa; Chou Chi Man; Kam Chi Weng; Kou Pei Tak; Kwan Chi Wai; Lam Io Sang; Lei Kin Chong; Leong Kin Pong; Leong Wai Kit; Ng Chi Kin; Ng Kam Hong; Sin Iao Kan; Tang Hou Cheong; U Chon Meng; Wong Chan Hong; Wong Chong Seng; Wong Hon Chio; Wong Wai Ip; Wu Ka Io; Wu Ngou Teng | Kyaw Thu Aung; Than Aung; Win Htut Aung; Aung Zaw Aye; Win Htike; Kyaw Myo Khaing; Aung Ko; Naing Lin; Tun Tun Lin; Aung Ko Min; Zaw Min; Khin Maung Myint; Zaw Naing; Yan Paing; Saw Khay Sha; Aung Lwin Soe; Kyaw Soe; Ye Aung Soe; Kyaw Lin Tun; Shwe Hla Win; Thaung Win; Min Min Zaw; Myo Zaw; Naing Naing Zaw |
| Singapore | South Korea | Thailand | |
| Ang Chin Leng; Glenn Chan; Chia Yi Liang; Chua Kwee Hong; Jonathan Gan; Gan Choon Kiat; Kieu Chin Wah; Alvan Lim; Liu Hou Cheng; Luo Weining; Mokmin Faizal; Ng Choon Chek; Ashley Ong; Terence Ong; Andrew Sim; Siu Jun Yang; Tan Chun Leng; Derick Tan; Jerry Tan; Raymond Tan; Jeffrey Tan; Jeffrey Tan; Wong Kah Shawn; Yeo Chin Hwei | Byeon Hong-kyun; Gu Ja-uk; Hyun Jae-chan; Jeong Seung-gyun; Kim Chang-soo; Kim Hyun-soo; Kim Seon-ho; Kim Yong-hyun; Kim Yu-ho; Lee Byung-tak; Lee Hyun-woo; Lee Seong-won; Lee Suk-hwan; Oh Byung-hoon; Oh Joong-dae; Park Ho-gi; Park Jeong-hoon; Park Jeong-keun; Park Min-ho; Shim Dae-seop; Shin Heon-sub; Shin Yun-gyu; Song Myeong-chan; Yang Byung-doo | Surachai Anun; Winai Arino; Suriya Butnongwa; Paiboon Chanpram; Suthumarat Chengcharoen; Chaiyakarn Choochuen; Manit Haisok; Santas Mingwongyang; Thunyaboon Nasok; Thotsaporn Pholseth; Samart Pimharn; Amnat Pinthong; Anuchit Promdonkloy; Montean Pudchakieo; Yutthapong Ruangjan; Vinya Seechomchuen; Somsong Suebsingkan; Gunyakorn Tawa; Jakkapong Thomjoho; Chayun Tuejaima; Bamrung Udompan; Ekkapong Wongunjai; Wuttikrai Wongupparee; Piyapong Wootti | |

== Results ==
=== Heats ===
- Qualification: 1 + Next best time → Grand final (GF), Rest → Repechage (R)

==== Heat 1 ====
| Rank | Team | Time | Notes |
|---|---|---|---|
| 1 | China | 50.996 | GF |
| 2 | Chinese Taipei | 51.950 | R |
| 3 | Japan | 53.258 | R |
| 4 | Iran | 53.282 | R |
| 5 | Macau | 54.212 | R |
| 6 | South Korea | 54.524 | R |

==== Heat 2 ====
| Rank | Team | Time | Notes |
|---|---|---|---|
| 1 | Indonesia | 49.425 | GF |
| 2 | Myanmar | 50.049 | GF |
| 3 | Thailand | 51.537 | R |
| 4 | Singapore | 54.226 | R |
| 5 | Hong Kong | 56.451 | R |

=== Repechages ===
- Qualification: 1 + Next best time → Grand final (GF), Rest → Minnor final (MF)

==== Repechage 1 ====
| Rank | Team | Time | Notes |
|---|---|---|---|
| 1 | Thailand | 52.205 | GF |
| 2 | Japan | 53.723 | GF |
| 3 | South Korea | 54.287 | MF |
| 4 | Macau | 55.481 | MF |

==== Repechage 2 ====
| Rank | Team | Time | Notes |
|---|---|---|---|
| 1 | Chinese Taipei | 53.784 | GF |
| 2 | Iran | 54.060 | MF |
| 3 | Singapore | 55.398 | MF |
| 4 | Hong Kong | 58.230 | MF |

=== Finals ===
==== Minor final ====
| Rank | Team | Time |
|---|---|---|
| 1 | South Korea | 54.083 |
| 2 | Iran | 54.779 |
| 3 | Singapore | 55.331 |
| 4 | Macau | 55.547 |
| 5 | Hong Kong | 57.503 |

==== Grand final ====
| Rank | Team | Time |
|---|---|---|
| 1st place, gold medalist(s) | Indonesia | 48.681 |
| 2nd place, silver medalist(s) | Myanmar | 49.401 |
| 3rd place, bronze medalist(s) | China | 49.467 |
| 4 | Thailand | 50.379 |
| 5 | Chinese Taipei | 51.927 |
| 6 | Japan | 52.947 |
