= Sailing at the 2010 Asian Games – Hobie 16 =

Open Hobie 16 at the 2010 Asian Games
- Venue: Shanwei Water Sports Center
- Date: 14–20 November 2010
- Competitors: 14 from 7 nations

Medalists
gold medal	Damrongsak Vongtim; Kitsada Vongtim	Thailand
silver medal	Jun Joo-hyun; Jeong Gweon	South Korea
bronze medal	Teo Wee Chin; Justin Wong	Singapore

The open Hobie 16 competition at the 2010 Asian Games in Shanwei was held from 14 to 20 November 2010.

== Schedule ==
All times are China Standard Time (UTC+08:00)

Date	Time	Event
Sunday, 14 November 2010	12:00	Race 1
Sunday, 14 November 2010	12:00	Race 2
Monday, 15 November 2010	12:00	Race 3
Monday, 15 November 2010	12:00	Race 4
Tuesday, 16 November 2010	12:00	Race 5
Tuesday, 16 November 2010	12:00	Race 6
Wednesday, 17 November 2010	12:00	Race 7
Wednesday, 17 November 2010	12:00	Race 8
Friday, 19 November 2010	12:00	Race 9
Saturday, 20 November 2010	12:00	Race 10
Saturday, 20 November 2010	12:00	Race 11
Saturday, 20 November 2010	12:00	Race 12

== Results ==
Legend

- DNF — Did not finish
- DPI — Discretionary penalty imposed
- DSQ — Disqualification

Rank	Team	Race												Total
Rank	Team	1	2	3	4	5	6	7	8	9	10	11	12	Total
1st place, gold medalist(s)	Thailand (THA); Damrongsak Vongtim; Kitsada Vongtim	1	1	1	1	2	1	1	3	2	1	1	~~(4)~~	15
2nd place, silver medalist(s)	South Korea (KOR); Jun Joo-hyun; Jeong Gweon	2	2	2	2	~~(3)~~	2	3	2	1	3	3	1	23
3rd place, bronze medalist(s)	Singapore (SIN); Teo Wee Chin; Justin Wong	4	3	3	3	1	3	4	~~(5)~~	3	2	2	3	31
4	China (CHN); Wu Wutang; Liu Ming	3	~~(8)~~; DSQ	8 DNF	5	5	7	2	1	5	4	5	2	47
5	Hong Kong (HKG); Tong Yui Shing; Tong Kit Fong	5	6	4	4	4	4	5	4	~~(8)~~; DSQ	5	4	5	50
6	Iran (IRI); Hossein Issapour; Mohammad Rahi	~~(8)~~; DPI	6 DPI	6	6	6	6	7	7	6	6	6	6	68
7	Indonesia (INA); Ario Dipo Subagio; Sujatmiko	~~(8)~~; DPI	7.5; DPI	5	7	7	5	6	6	4	7	7	7	68.5
