= Wrestling at the 2010 Asian Games – Men's freestyle 120 kg =

Men's freestyle 120 kg at the 2010 Asian Games
- Venue: Huagong Gymnasium
- Date: 25 November 2010
- Competitors: 13 from 13 nations

Medalists
gold medal	Artur Taymazov	Uzbekistan
silver medal	Jargalsaikhany Chuluunbat	Mongolia
bronze medal	Liang Lei	China
bronze medal	Fardin Masoumi	Iran

The men's freestyle 120 kilograms wrestling competition at the 2010 Asian Games in Guangzhou was held on 25 November 2010 at the Huagong Gymnasium.

This freestyle wrestling competition consisted of a single-elimination tournament, with a repechage used to determine the winner of two bronze medals. The two finalists faced off for gold and silver medals. Each wrestler who lost to one of the two finalists moved into the repechage, culminating in a pair of bronze medal matches featuring the semifinal losers each facing the remaining repechage opponent from their half of the bracket.

Each bout consisted of up to three rounds, lasting two minutes apiece. The wrestler who scored more points in each round was the winner of that rounds; the bout finished when one wrestler had won two rounds (and thus the match).

== Schedule ==
All times are China Standard Time (UTC+08:00)

Date	Time	Event
Thursday, 25 November 2010	09:30	1/8 finals
Thursday, 25 November 2010	09:30	Quarterfinals
Thursday, 25 November 2010	09:30	Semifinals
Thursday, 25 November 2010	16:00	Repechages
Thursday, 25 November 2010	17:00	Finals

== Results ==
Legend

- F — Won by fall
- R — Retired

=== Main bracket ===
1/8 finals
Nobuyoshi Arakida (JPN)	0	1
Liang Lei (CHN)	1	2
Artur Taymazov (UZB)	1	3
Fardin Masoumi (IRI)	0	0
Rajiv Tomar (IND)	3	0
Aiaal Lazarev (KGZ)	6	6
Nurzhan Katayev (KAZ)	3	3^{F}
Shodi Bakhromov (TJK)	0	0
Satyendra Prasad Yadav (NEP)	0	0
Mohammed Sabah (IRQ)	6	6

Quarterfinals
Hudaýberdi Sahatow (TKM)	0	0
Jargalsaikhany Chuluunbat (MGL)	6	6
Jung Yei-hyun (KOR)	0	2	0
Liang Lei (CHN)	3	0	1
Artur Taymazov (UZB)	1	1
Aiaal Lazarev (KGZ)	0	0
Nurzhan Katayev (KAZ)	6	4
Mohammed Sabah (IRQ)	0	0

Semifinals
Jargalsaikhany Chuluunbat (MGL)	0	1	1
Liang Lei (CHN)	3	0	0
Artur Taymazov (UZB)	2	3
Nurzhan Katayev (KAZ)	0	0

Final
Jargalsaikhany Chuluunbat (MGL)	0	0
Artur Taymazov (UZB)	3	1

=== Repechage ===
Repechage round 1
Fardin Masoumi (IRI)	8	3
Aiaal Lazarev (KGZ)	2	0

Bronze medals
Hudaýberdi Sahatow (TKM)	0	0
Liang Lei (CHN)	1	3
Fardin Masoumi (IRI)	1	1
Nurzhan Katayev (KAZ)	1	1^{R}

== Final standing ==
Rank	Athlete
1st place, gold medalist(s)	Artur Taymazov (UZB)
2nd place, silver medalist(s)	Jargalsaikhany Chuluunbat (MGL)
3rd place, bronze medalist(s)	Liang Lei (CHN)
3rd place, bronze medalist(s)	Fardin Masoumi (IRI)
5	Hudaýberdi Sahatow (TKM)
5	Nurzhan Katayev (KAZ)
7	Mohammed Sabah (IRQ)
8	Aiaal Lazarev (KGZ)
9	Rajiv Tomar (IND)
10	Jung Yei-hyun (KOR)
11	Nobuyoshi Arakida (JPN)
12	Shodi Bakhromov (TJK)
13	Satyendra Prasad Yadav (NEP)
