= Karate at the 2010 Asian Games – Women's kumite 55 kg =

Karate competition

Women's kumite 55 kg at the 2010 Asian Games
- Venue: Guangdong Gymnasium
- Date: 25 November 2010
- Competitors: 12 from 12 nations

Medalists
gold medal	Lê Bích Phương	Vietnam
silver medal	Miki Kobayashi	Japan
bronze medal	Fatemeh Chalaki	Iran
bronze medal	Ahn Tae-eun	South Korea

The women's kumite 50 kilograms competition at the 2010 Asian Games in Guangzhou, China was held on 25 November 2010 at the Guangdong Gymnasium.

== Schedule ==
All times are China Standard Time (UTC+08:00)

Date	Time	Event
Thursday, 25 November 2010	14:00	1/8 finals
Thursday, 25 November 2010	14:00	Quarterfinals
Thursday, 25 November 2010	14:00	Semifinals
Thursday, 25 November 2010	14:00	Repechage 1
Thursday, 25 November 2010	14:00	Bronze medal match
Thursday, 25 November 2010	14:00	Final

== Results ==
Legend

- H — Won by hansoku

=== Main bracket ===
1/8 finals
Fatemeh Chalaki (IRI)	2
Yekaterina Khupovets (KAZ)	1
Marna Pabillore (PHI)	1
Vathana Gopalasamy (MAS)	1
Syiem Linza Fenny (IND)	3
Roji Nagarkoti (NEP)	2
Ahn Tae-eun (KOR)	0
Lê Bích Phương (VIE)	4

Quarterfinals
Miki Kobayashi (JPN)	3
Fatemeh Chalaki (IRI)	0
Marna Pabillore (PHI)	4^{H}
Ramilia Eshmambetova (KGZ)	0
Lao Un Ieng (MAC)	0
Syiem Linza Fenny (IND)	0
Lê Bích Phương (VIE)	3
Regina Niyazova (UZB)	1

Semifinals
Miki Kobayashi (JPN)	1
Marna Pabillore (PHI)	0
Lao Un Ieng (MAC)	0
Lê Bích Phương (VIE)	8

Final
Miki Kobayashi (JPN)	3
Lê Bích Phương (VIE)	4

=== Repechage ===
Repechage 1
Ahn Tae-eun (KOR)	5
Regina Niyazova (UZB)	2

Bronze medal match
Fatemeh Chalaki (IRI)	1
Marna Pabillore (PHI)	0
Ahn Tae-eun (KOR)	4
Lao Un Ieng (MAC)	2
