= Canoeing at the 2010 Asian Games – Men's C-1 1000 metres =

Men's C-1 1000 metres at the 2010 Asian Games
- Venue: Guangzhou International Rowing Centre
- Date: 22–25 November 2010
- Competitors: 11 from 11 nations

Medalists
gold medal	Vadim Menkov	Uzbekistan
silver medal	Shahoo Nasseri	Iran
bronze medal	Xie Weiyong	China

The men's C-1 1000 metres sprint canoeing competition at the 2010 Asian Games in Guangzhou was held from 22 to 25 November at the International Rowing Centre.

== Schedule ==
All times are China Standard Time (UTC+08:00)

Date	Time	Event
Monday, 22 November 2010	10:20	Heats
Tuesday, 23 November 2010	10:10	Semifinal
Thursday, 25 November 2010	10:10	Final

== Results ==
=== Heats ===
- Qualification: 1–3 → Final (QF), Rest → Semifinal (QS)

==== Heat 1 ====
Rank	Athlete	Time	Notes
1	Vadim Menkov (UZB)	3:54.527	QF
2	Shahoo Nasseri (IRI)	3:55.452	QF
3	Ruslan Muratov (KAZ)	4:02.529	QF
4	Jamesboy Singh (IND)	4:22.030	QS
5	Thammarat Phaophandee (THA)	4:28.363	QS
6	Dany Funelas (PHI)	4:34.964	QS

==== Heat 2 ====
Rank	Athlete	Time	Notes
1	Kim Tae-eun (KOR)	4:15.908	QF
2	Hoàng Hồng Anh (VIE)	4:16.186	QF
3	Xie Weiyong (CHN)	4:16.300	QF
4	Takayuki Kokaji (JPN)	4:16.554	QS
5	Chen Chou Yueh-hung (TPE)	4:18.674	QS

=== Semifinal ===
- Qualification: 1–3 → Final (QF)

Rank	Athlete	Time	Notes
1	Jamesboy Singh (IND)	4:15.277	QF
2	Takayuki Kokaji (JPN)	4:16.011	QF
3	Chen Chou Yueh-hung (TPE)	4:20.342	QF
4	Dany Funelas (PHI)	4:28.672	
5	Thammarat Phaophandee (THA)	4:28.801	

=== Final ===
Rank	Athlete	Time
1st place, gold medalist(s)	Vadim Menkov (UZB)	3:51.419
2nd place, silver medalist(s)	Shahoo Nasseri (IRI)	3:53.232
3rd place, bronze medalist(s)	Xie Weiyong (CHN)	3:56.081
4	Ruslan Muratov (KAZ)	4:03.216
5	Takayuki Kokaji (JPN)	4:08.201
6	Kim Tae-eun (KOR)	4:08.864
7	Chen Chou Yueh-hung (TPE)	4:11.371
8	Jamesboy Singh (IND)	4:20.405
9	Hoàng Hồng Anh (VIE)	4:20.904
