= Shooting at the 2010 Asian Games – Women's double trap team =

Women's double trap team at the 2010 Asian Games
- Venue: Guangzhou Shotgun Centre
- Dates: 21 November 2010
- Competitors: 15 from 5 nations

Medalists
| gold medal | China; Li Qingnian, Li Rui, Zhang Yafei |
| silver medal | South Korea; Kang Gee-eun, Kim Mi-jin, Lee Bo-na |
| bronze medal | Thailand; Punnapa Asvanit, Chattaya Kitcharoen, Janejira Srisongkram |

The women's double trap team competition at the 2010 Asian Games in Guangzhou, China was held on 21 November at the Guangzhou Shotgun Centre.

== Schedule ==
All times are China Standard Time (UTC+08:00)

| Date | Time | Event |
|---|---|---|
| Sunday, 21 November 2010 | 09:00 | Final |

== Records ==
Prior to this competition, the existing world, Asian and Games records were as follows.

| World Record | China | 328 | Cairo, Egypt | 4 May 2001 |
| Asian Record | China | 328 | Cairo, Egypt | 4 May 2001 |
| Games Record | China | 325 | Busan, South Korea | 5 October 2002 |

== Results ==
| Rank | Team | Round | | | Total | Notes |
| Rank | Team | 1 | 2 | 3 | Total | Notes |
|---|---|---|---|---|---|---|
| 1st place, gold medalist(s) | China (CHN) | 104 | 105 | 106 | 315 | |
| | Li Qingnian | 37 | 34 | 35 | 106 | |
| | Li Rui | 33 | 35 | 37 | 105 | |
| | Zhang Yafei | 34 | 36 | 34 | 104 | |
| 2nd place, silver medalist(s) | South Korea (KOR) | 99 | 88 | 95 | 282 | |
| | Kang Gee-eun | 31 | 31 | 31 | 93 | |
| | Kim Mi-jin | 32 | 30 | 33 | 95 | |
| | Lee Bo-na | 36 | 27 | 31 | 94 | |
| 3rd place, bronze medalist(s) | Thailand (THA) | 89 | 96 | 91 | 276 | |
| | Punnapa Asvanit | 25 | 27 | 28 | 80 | |
| | Chattaya Kitcharoen | 30 | 34 | 28 | 92 | |
| | Janejira Srisongkram | 34 | 35 | 35 | 104 | |
| 4 | Iran (IRI) | 78 | 65 | 73 | 216 | |
| | Masoumeh Ameri | 25 | 22 | 19 | 66 | |
| | Bahareh Jahandar | 27 | 21 | 30 | 78 | |
| | Sepideh Sirani | 26 | 22 | 24 | 72 | |
| 5 | Qatar (QAT) | 54 | 62 | 70 | 186 | |
| | Noora Al-Ali | 20 | 22 | 25 | 67 | |
| | Kholoud Al-Khalaf | 14 | 17 | 24 | 55 | |
| | Nawal Al-Khalaf | 20 | 23 | 21 | 64 | |
