= Judo at the 2010 Asian Games – Men's openweight =

Judo competition

Men's openweight at the 2010 Asian Games
- Venue: Huagong Gymnasium
- Date: 16 November 2010
- Competitors: 16 from 16 nations

Medalists
gold medal	Kazuhiko Takahashi	Japan
silver medal	Mohammad Reza Roudaki	Iran
bronze medal	Khadbaataryn Mönkhbaatar	Mongolia
bronze medal	Utkir Kurbanov	Uzbekistan

The men's openweight competition at the 2010 Asian Games in Guangzhou, China was held on 16 November 2010 at the Huagong Gymnasium.

== Schedule ==
All times are China Standard Time (UTC+08:00)

Date	Time	Event
Tuesday, 16 November 2010	10:00	Preliminary
Tuesday, 16 November 2010	10:00	Quarterfinals
Tuesday, 16 November 2010	15:00	Final of repechage
Tuesday, 16 November 2010	15:00	Final of table
Tuesday, 16 November 2010	15:00	Finals

== Results ==
Legend

- WO — Won by walkover

=== Main bracket ===
Preliminary
Ulan Ryskul (KAZ)	100
Phengsy Phonepaseud (LAO)	000
Hudaýberdi Sahatow (TKM)	100
Kim Soo-whan (KOR)	010
Khadbaataryn Mönkhbaatar (MGL)	001
Saud Al-Busiri (IOC)	000
Khaled Al-Araifi (BRN)	000
Kazuhiko Takahashi (JPN)	100
Tomohiko Hoshina (PHI)	000
Utkir Kurbanov (UZB)	100
Mohammad Reza Roudaki (IRI)	020
Rashed Zaidan (KSA)	000
Shah Hussain Shah (PAK)	WO
Rudy Hachache (LIB)
Wang Hao (CHN)	100
Iurii Krakovetskii (KGZ)	000

Quarterfinals
Ulan Ryskul (KAZ)	111
Hudaýberdi Sahatow (TKM)	000
Khadbaataryn Mönkhbaatar (MGL)	000
Kazuhiko Takahashi (JPN)	100
Utkir Kurbanov (UZB)	010
Mohammad Reza Roudaki (IRI)	012
Shah Hussain Shah (PAK)	000
Wang Hao (CHN)	100

Final of table
Ulan Ryskul (KAZ)	000
Kazuhiko Takahashi (JPN)	100
Mohammad Reza Roudaki (IRI)	111
Wang Hao (CHN)	000

Gold medal
Kazuhiko Takahashi (JPN)	100
Mohammad Reza Roudaki (IRI)	000

=== Repechage ===
Final of repechage
Hudaýberdi Sahatow (TKM)	000
Khadbaataryn Mönkhbaatar (MGL)	100
Utkir Kurbanov (UZB)	100
Shah Hussain Shah (PAK)	000

Bronze medals
Khadbaataryn Mönkhbaatar (MGL)	100
Wang Hao (CHN)	000
Utkir Kurbanov (UZB)	100
Ulan Ryskul (KAZ)	000
