= Taekwondo at the 2010 Asian Games – Men's 68 kg =

Taekwondo competition

Men's 68 kg at the 2010 Asian Games
- Venue: Guangdong Gymnasium
- Date: 19 November 2010
- Competitors: 22 from 22 nations

Medalists
gold medal	Mohammad Bagheri Motamed	Iran
silver medal	Jang Se-wook	South Korea
bronze medal	Huang Jiannan	China
bronze medal	Lo Tsung-jui	Chinese Taipei

The men's featherweight (−68 kilograms) event at the 2010 Asian Games took place on 19 November 2010 at Guangdong Gymnasium, Guangzhou, China.

== Schedule ==
All times are China Standard Time (UTC+08:00)

Date	Time	Event
Friday, 19 November 2010	09:00	1/16 finals
Friday, 19 November 2010	09:00	1/8 finals
Friday, 19 November 2010	14:00	Quarterfinals
Friday, 19 November 2010	14:00	Semifinals
Friday, 19 November 2010	16:30	Final

== Results ==
Legend

- P — Won by punitive declaration

=== Final ===
Final
Mohammad Bagheri Motamed (IRI)	6
Jang Se-wook (KOR)	4

=== Top half ===
1/16 finals
Supakit Chanteerawong (THA)	1
Mohammad Bagheri Motamed (IRI)	5
Afifuddin Omar Sidek (MAS)	2
Chandan Lakra (IND)	6
Huang Jiannan (CHN)	9
Ghali Al-Matrafi (KSA)	2

1/8 finals
Mohammad Abulibdeh (JOR)	1
Mohammad Bagheri Motamed (IRI)	2
Ashish Maharjan (NEP)	2
Said Gafar Salih (QAT)	6
Naranchimegiin Erdenebaatar (MGL)	19
Chandan Lakra (IND)	7
Huang Jiannan (CHN)	10
Mesfer Al-Ajmi (IOC)	2

Quarterfinals
Mohammad Bagheri Motamed (IRI)	6
Said Gafar Salih (QAT)	2
Naranchimegiin Erdenebaatar (MGL)	4
Huang Jiannan (CHN)	13

Semifinals
Mohammad Bagheri Motamed (IRI)	8
Huang Jiannan (CHN)	3

=== Bottom half ===
1/16 finals
Jeffrey Figueroa (PHI)	5
Rashed Bilal (UAE)	3
Macho Virgonta Hungan (INA)	8
Michel Samaha (LIB)	7
Rohullah Nikpai (AFG)	3
Maksim Rafalovich (UZB)	1

1/8 finals
Farkhod Negmatov (TJK)	6^{P}
Jeffrey Figueroa (PHI)	6
Macho Virgonta Hungan (INA)	4
Jang Se-wook (KOR)	10
Md Arman Hossain (BAN)	2
Saysana Vannavong (LAO)	10
Rohullah Nikpai (AFG)	0
Lo Tsung-jui (TPE)	1

Quarterfinals
Farkhod Negmatov (TJK)	6
Jang Se-wook (KOR)	7
Saysana Vannavong (LAO)	3
Lo Tsung-jui (TPE)	13

Semifinals
Jang Se-wook (KOR)	5
Lo Tsung-jui (TPE)	0
