= Taekwondo at the 2010 Asian Games – Men's 80 kg =

Taekwondo competition

Men's 80 kg at the 2010 Asian Games
- Venue: Guangdong Gymnasium
- Date: 18 November 2010
- Competitors: 20 from 20 nations

Medalists
gold medal	Nabil Talal	Jordan
silver medal	Nesar Ahmad Bahave	Afghanistan
bronze medal	Zhao Lin	China
bronze medal	Farzad Abdollahi	Iran

The men's welterweight (−80 kilograms) event at the 2010 Asian Games took place on 18 November 2010 at Guangdong Gymnasium, Guangzhou, China.

== Schedule ==
All times are China Standard Time (UTC+08:00)

Date	Time	Event
Thursday, 18 November 2010	09:00	1/16 finals
Thursday, 18 November 2010	09:00	1/8 finals
Thursday, 18 November 2010	14:00	Quarterfinals
Thursday, 18 November 2010	14:00	Semifinals
Thursday, 18 November 2010	16:30	Final

== Results ==
Legend

- DQ — Won by disqualification
- P — Won by punitive declaration

=== Final ===
Final
Nabil Talal (JOR)	4
Nesar Ahmad Bahave (AFG)	3

=== Top half ===
1/16 finals
Yoshihiro Nagano (JPN)	0
Nabil Talal (JOR)	14
Md Mizanur Rahman (BAN)	2
Zhao Lin (CHN)	12

1/8 finals
Chien Yi-hsin (TPE)	6
Nabil Talal (JOR)	10
Eisa Al-Shammeri (IOC)
Anand Pandiarajan (IND)	DQ
Sultan Kassymov (KAZ)	2
Alisher Gulov (TJK)	6
Zhao Lin (CHN)	9
Tashi Tashi (BHU)	6

Quarterfinals
Nabil Talal (JOR)	5
Anand Pandiarajan (IND)	3
Alisher Gulov (TJK)	5
Zhao Lin (CHN)	6

Semifinals
Nabil Talal (JOR)	5
Zhao Lin (CHN)	1

=== Bottom half ===
1/16 finals
Raviendra Raja (SRI)	0
Jasur Baykuziyev (UZB)	4^{P}
Hamad Wadeea (BRN)	3
Marlon Avenido (PHI)	7

1/8 finals
Farzad Abdollahi (IRI)	11
Jasur Baykuziyev (UZB)	2
Basuki Nugroho (INA)	2
Lương Minh Đạt (VIE)	3
Yadav Poudel (NEP)	3
Nesar Ahmad Bahave (AFG)	15
Marlon Avenido (PHI)	10^{P}
Hani Al-Matrafi (KSA)	9

Quarterfinals
Farzad Abdollahi (IRI)	13
Lương Minh Đạt (VIE)	1
Nesar Ahmad Bahave (AFG)	12
Marlon Avenido (PHI)	11

Semifinals
Farzad Abdollahi (IRI)	5
Nesar Ahmad Bahave (AFG)	9
