= Karate at the 2010 Asian Games – Women's kumite 68 kg =

Karate competition

Women's kumite 68 kg at the 2010 Asian Games
- Venue: Guangdong Gymnasium
- Date: 26 November 2010
- Competitors: 10 from 10 nations

Medalists
gold medal	Feng Lanlan	China
silver medal	Emiko Honma	Japan
bronze medal	Samira Malekipour	Iran
bronze medal	Liu Ya-li	Chinese Taipei

The women's kumite 68 kilograms competition at the 2010 Asian Games in Guangzhou, China was held on 26 November 2010 at the Guangdong Gymnasium.

== Schedule ==
All times are China Standard Time (UTC+08:00)

Date	Time	Event
Friday, 26 November 2010	09:30	1/8 finals
Friday, 26 November 2010	09:30	Quarterfinals
Friday, 26 November 2010	09:30	Semifinals
Friday, 26 November 2010	09:30	Bronze medal match
Friday, 26 November 2010	09:30	Final

== Results ==
=== Main bracket ===
1/8 finals
Sofiya Kaspulatova (UZB)	6
Asel Malabekova (KGZ)	0
Anna Zelenova (KAZ)	0
Liu Ya-li (TPE)	1

Quarterfinals
Yulanda Asmuruf (INA)	7
Sofiya Kaspulatova (UZB)	4
Samira Malekipour (IRI)	0
Emiko Honma (JPN)	2
Simmi Batta (IND)	0
Liu Ya-li (TPE)	3
Tara Gurung (NEP)	0
Feng Lanlan (CHN)	9

Semifinals
Yulanda Asmuruf (INA)	1
Emiko Honma (JPN)	3
Liu Ya-li (TPE)	1
Feng Lanlan (CHN)	4

Final
Emiko Honma (JPN)	0
Feng Lanlan (CHN)	3

=== Repechage ===
Bronze medal match
Samira Malekipour (IRI)	7
Yulanda Asmuruf (INA)	3
Tara Gurung (NEP)	0
Liu Ya-li (TPE)	8
