= Shooting at the 2010 Asian Games – Women's double trap =

Women's double trap at the 2010 Asian Games
- Venue: Guangzhou Shotgun Centre
- Dates: 21 November 2010
- Competitors: 16 from 6 nations

Medalists
| gold medal | Li Qingnian | China |
| silver medal | Li Rui | China |
| bronze medal | Janejira Srisongkram | Thailand |

The women's double trap competition at the 2010 Asian Games in Guangzhou, China was held on 21 November at the Guangzhou Shotgun Centre.

== Schedule ==
All times are China Standard Time (UTC+08:00)

| Date | Time | Event |
|---|---|---|
| Sunday, 21 November 2010 | 09:00 | Final |

== Records ==
Prior to this competition, the existing world, Asian and Games records were as follows.

| World Record | Zhang Yafei (CHN) | 115 | Nicosia, Cyprus | 20 October 2000 |
| Asian Record | Zhang Yafei (CHN) | 115 | Nicosia, Cyprus | 20 October 2000 |
| Games Record | Wang Yujin (CHN) | 112 | Hiroshima, Japan | 10 October 1994 |

== Results ==
| Rank | Athlete | Round | | | Total | S-off | Notes |
| Rank | Athlete | 1 | 2 | 3 | Total | S-off | Notes |
|---|---|---|---|---|---|---|---|
| 1st place, gold medalist(s) | Li Qingnian (CHN) | 37 | 34 | 35 | 106 | | |
| 2nd place, silver medalist(s) | Li Rui (CHN) | 33 | 35 | 37 | 105 | | |
| 3 | Zhang Yafei (CHN) | 34 | 36 | 34 | 104 | +2 | |
| 3rd place, bronze medalist(s) | Janejira Srisongkram (THA) | 34 | 35 | 35 | 104 | +1 | |
| 5 | Kim Mi-jin (KOR) | 32 | 30 | 33 | 95 | | |
| 6 | Lee Bo-na (KOR) | 36 | 27 | 31 | 94 | | |
| 7 | Kang Gee-eun (KOR) | 31 | 31 | 31 | 93 | | |
| 8 | Chattaya Kitcharoen (THA) | 30 | 34 | 28 | 92 | | |
| 9 | Hsu Jie-yu (TPE) | 26 | 33 | 26 | 85 | | |
| 10 | Punnapa Asvanit (THA) | 25 | 27 | 28 | 80 | | |
| 11 | Bahareh Jahandar (IRI) | 27 | 21 | 30 | 78 | | |
| 12 | Sepideh Sirani (IRI) | 26 | 22 | 24 | 72 | | |
| 13 | Noora Al-Ali (QAT) | 20 | 22 | 25 | 67 | | |
| 14 | Masoumeh Ameri (IRI) | 25 | 22 | 19 | 66 | | |
| 15 | Nawal Al-Khalaf (QAT) | 20 | 23 | 21 | 64 | | |
| 16 | Kholoud Al-Khalaf (QAT) | 14 | 17 | 24 | 55 | | |

- Janejira Srisongkram was awarded bronze because of no three-medal sweep per country rule.
