= Wushu at the 2010 Asian Games – Men's sanshou 70 kg =

Men's sanshou 70 kg at the 2010 Asian Games
- Venue: Nansha Gymnasium
- Dates: 14–17 November 2010
- Competitors: 16 from 16 nations

Medalists
| gold medal | Zhang Yong | China |
| silver medal | Cai Liang Chan | Macau |
| bronze medal | Vương Đình Khanh | Vietnam |
| bronze medal | Sajjad Abbasi | Iran |

The men's sanshou 70 kilograms competition at the 2010 Asian Games in Guangzhou, China was held from 14 November to 17 November at the Nansha Gymnasium.

A total of sixteen competitors from sixteen countries competed in this event, limited to fighters whose body weight was less than 70 kilograms.

Zhang Yong from China won the gold medal after beating Cai Liang Chan of Macau in gold medal bout in two straight rounds 2–0, Zhang won both periods in the final. The bronze medal was shared by Sajjad Abbasi from Iran and Vương Đình Khanh of Vietnam after they lost in their semifinal matches.

Athletes from South Korea (Yoo Sang-hoon), Kazakhstan (Birzhan Abdolla), Chinese Taipei (Chou Ting-yuan) and Laos (Sommay Xayavong) shared the fifth place.

Athletes from the Philippines (Eduard Folayang), India (Sandeep Yadav), Afghanistan (Mohammad Salim Zarifi), Lebanon (Elias El-Rayess), Thailand (Artit Srisomboon), Kyrgyzstan (Stalbek Darkanbaev), Pakistan (Kamran Khalid) and Turkmenistan (Nurmyrat Babayev) lost in the first round and did not advance further.

== Schedule ==
All times are China Standard Time (UTC+08:00)

| Date | Time | Event |
|---|---|---|
| Sunday, 14 November 2010 | 19:30 | Round of 16 |
| Monday, 15 November 2010 | 19:30 | Quarterfinals |
| Tuesday, 16 November 2010 | 19:30 | Semifinals |
| Wednesday, 17 November 2010 | 19:30 | Final |

== Results ==
Round of 16
Sommay Xayavong (LAO) | 2
Elias El-Rayess (LIB) | 0
Cai Liang Chan (MAC) | 2
Mohammad Salim Zarifi (AFG) | 0
Nurmyrat Babaýew (TKM) | 0
Birzhan Abdolla (KAZ) | 2
Sandeep Yadav (IND) | 0
Vương Đình Khanh (VIE) | 2
Zhang Yong (CHN) | 2
Eduard Folayang (PHI) | 0
Stalbek Darkanbaev (KGZ) | 0
Yoo Sang-hoon (KOR) | 2
Artit Srisomboon (THA) | 0
Chou Ting-yuan (TPE) | 2
Kamran Khalid (PAK) | 0
Sajjad Abbasi (IRI) | 2

Quarterfinals
Sommay Xayavong (LAO) | 0
Cai Liang Chan (MAC) | 2
Birzhan Abdolla (KAZ) | 0
Vương Đình Khanh (VIE) | 2
Zhang Yong (CHN) | 2
Yoo Sang-hoon (KOR) | 0
Chou Ting-yuan (TPE) | 0
Sajjad Abbasi (IRI) | 2

Semifinals
Cai Liang Chan (MAC) | 2
Vương Đình Khanh (VIE) | 1
Zhang Yong (CHN) | 2
Sajjad Abbasi (IRI) | 0

Final
Cai Liang Chan (MAC) | 0
Zhang Yong (CHN) | 2
