= Wrestling at the 2010 Asian Games – Men's freestyle 84 kg =

Wrestling competition

Men's freestyle 84 kg at the 2010 Asian Games
- Venue: Huagong Gymnasium
- Date: 24 November 2010
- Competitors: 11 from 11 nations

Medalists
gold medal	Jamal Mirzaei	Iran
silver medal	Lee Jae-sung	South Korea
bronze medal	Pürveegiin Ösökhbaatar	Mongolia
bronze medal	Yermek Baiduashov	Kazakhstan

The men's freestyle 84 kilograms wrestling competition at the 2010 Asian Games in Guangzhou was held on 24 November 2010 at the Huagong Gymnasium.

This freestyle wrestling competition consisted of a single-elimination tournament, with a repechage used to determine the winner of two bronze medals. The two finalists faced off for gold and silver medals. Each wrestler who lost to one of the two finalists moved into the repechage, culminating in a pair of bronze medal matches featuring the semifinal losers each facing the remaining repechage opponent from their half of the bracket.

Each bout consisted of up to three rounds, lasting two minutes apiece. The wrestler who scored more points in each round was the winner of that rounds; the bout finished when one wrestler had won two rounds (and thus the match).

== Schedule ==
All times are China Standard Time (UTC+08:00)

Date	Time	Event
Wednesday, 24 November 2010	09:30	1/8 finals
Wednesday, 24 November 2010	09:30	Quarterfinals
Wednesday, 24 November 2010	09:30	Semifinals
Wednesday, 24 November 2010	16:00	Repechages
Wednesday, 24 November 2010	17:00	Finals

== Results ==
=== Main bracket ===
1/8 finals
Jamal Mirzaei (IRI)	7	6
Ibabekir Bekdurdiýew (TKM)	0	0
Muhammad Inam (PAK)	1	0	2
Atsushi Matsumoto (JPN)	0	2	0
Yermek Baiduashov (KAZ)	1	3
Toryalai Sadeqi (AFG)	0	0

Quarterfinals
Ram Vir (IND)	1	2	6
Aibek Usupov (KGZ)	0	2	0
Lee Jae-sung (KOR)	3	2
Pürveegiin Ösökhbaatar (MGL)	3	0
Maher Al-Khayat (SYR)	0	0
Jamal Mirzaei (IRI)	7	7
Muhammad Inam (PAK)	0	0
Yermek Baiduashov (KAZ)	3	7

Semifinals
Ram Vir (IND)	0	2
Lee Jae-sung (KOR)	1	3
Jamal Mirzaei (IRI)	5	1
Yermek Baiduashov (KAZ)	0	0

Final
Lee Jae-sung (KOR)	0	0
Jamal Mirzaei (IRI)	1	6

=== Repechage ===
Repechage round 1
Ibabekir Bekdurdiýew (TKM)	0	0
Maher Al-Khayat (SYR)	9	6

Bronze medals
Pürveegiin Ösökhbaatar (MGL)	2	4
Ram Vir (IND)	0	2
Maher Al-Khayat (SYR)	0	0
Yermek Baiduashov (KAZ)	7	7

== Final standing ==
Rank	Athlete
1st place, gold medalist(s)	Jamal Mirzaei (IRI)
2nd place, silver medalist(s)	Lee Jae-sung (KOR)
3rd place, bronze medalist(s)	Pürveegiin Ösökhbaatar (MGL)
3rd place, bronze medalist(s)	Yermek Baiduashov (KAZ)
5	Ram Vir (IND)
5	Maher Al-Khayat (SYR)
7	Muhammad Inam (PAK)
8	Atsushi Matsumoto (JPN)
9	Aibek Usupov (KGZ)
10	Toryalai Sadeqi (AFG)
11	Ibabekir Bekdurdiýew (TKM)
