= Sajjad Abbasi =

Iranian Wushu Minister

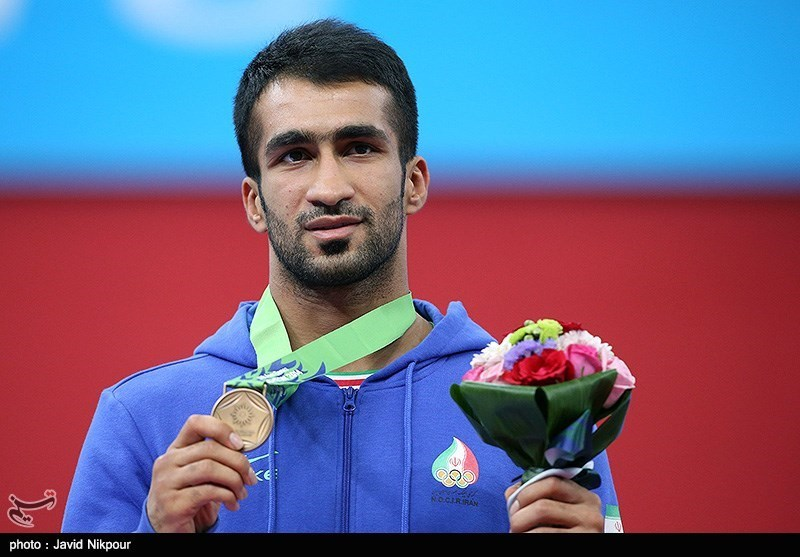

Personal information
- Full name: Sajjad Abbasi Amir
- Nationality: Iranian
- Born: January 25, 1990 (age 36) Qaem Shahr, Iran
- Height: 175 cm (5 ft 9 in)
- Weight: 77 kg (170 lb)

Sport
- Sport: Wushu
- Event: Sanda (sport)
Medal record
Representing Iran
Men's sanda
World Championships
Gold medal – first place	2011 Ankara	70 kg
Bronze medal – third place	2009 Toronto	70 kg
Asian Games
Bronze medal – third place	2010 Guangzhou	70 kg
Bronze medal – third place	2014 Incheon	70 kg
Islamic Solidarity Games
Gold medal – first place	2013 Palembang	70 kg
Asian Championships
Gold medal – first place	2012 Hanoi	70 kg
- Updated on 04 December 2020

Sajad Abbasi (born 25 January 1990, Qaem Shahr) is an Iranian men's Wushu champions from the Sanda district.

== Career ==
He started wushu in 2003 after kickboxing and karate and was able to win the gold in the West Asian Games and the gold in the Indonesian International Youth Games in 2008. Among his other titles, in addition to winning the top international positions, he won the Canada World bronze medal in 2009, the Olympic bronze medal in the 2010 Martial Games, the Guangzhou Asian Games bronze medal, the World Cup gold medal in 2010, the Pars Cup gold medals in 2010 and 2011, the Turkish world gold medal, and now he is the champion of the Asian Games. It is Vietnam.
