= Mohammad Reza Roudaki =

Iranian judoka (born 1984)

Mohammad Roudaki
Personal information
- Full name: Mohammad Reza Roudaki
- Born: 22 February 1984 (age 42) Shiraz, Iran
- Occupation: Judoka
- Height: 202 cm (6 ft 8 in) (2008)
- Weight: 140 kg (309 lb) (2008)

Sport
- Country: Iran
- Sport: Judo
- Weight class: +100 kg

Achievements and titles
- Olympic Games: R32 (2012)
- World Champ.: 5th (2011)
- Asian Champ.: (gold) (2005, 2012)
Medal record
Representing Iran
Men's judo
Asian Games
Silver medal – second place	2006 Doha	+100 kg
Silver medal – second place	2010 Guangzhou	Open
Bronze medal – third place	2010 Guangzhou	+100 kg
Asian Championships
Gold medal – first place	2005 Tashkent	+100 kg
Gold medal – first place	2012 Tashkent	+100 kg
Silver medal – second place	2007 Kuwait City	+100 kg
Silver medal – second place	2008 Jeju City	+100 kg
World Juniors Championships
Silver medal – second place	2002 Jeju	+100 kg
Asian Junior Championships
Bronze medal – third place	2003 Macau	+100 kg
Men's kurash
World Championships
Gold medal – first place	2009 Alushta	+100 kg

Profile at external databases
- IJF: 1758
- JudoInside.com: 26881
- Updated on 14 February 2022

Mohammad Reza Roudaki (Persian: محمدرضا رودکی, also spelled Rodaki, born 22 February 1984 in Shiraz) is an Iranian judoka.

He won a silver medal at the +100 kg category of the 2006 Asian Games.

Roudaki competed for Iran at the 2008 Summer Olympics and 2012 Summer Olympics.
