= Babak Ghorbani =

Iranian wrestler (1989–2014)

- 2010

Personal information
- Full name: Babak Ghorbani Goldasteh
- Born: 19 March 1989 Kermanshah, Iran
- Died: 16 November 2014 (aged 25) Kermanshah, Iran
- Resting place: Bagh Ferdos Cemetery, Kermanshah, Iran
- Years active: 2008–2011

Sport
- Country: Iran
- Sport: Sport wrestling
- Event: Greco-Roman
- Coached by: Touraj Mehri; Mohammad Bana
Medal record
Representing Iran
Men's Greco-Roman wrestling
Asian Games
Gold medal – first place	2010 Guangzhou	96 kg
Asian Championships
Gold medal – first place	2010 Delhi	96 kg

Babak Ghorbani (Persian: بابک قربانی; 19 March 1989 – 16 November 2014) was an Iranian wrestler. In 2011 he was banned from competing for two years for doping, in 2012 he was charged in a murder, and in 2014 he committed suicide in prison.

== Career ==
He won gold medal at 2010 Asian Games in Guangzhou.

In 2011, Ghorbani was banned from participation in FILA events for two years due to use of anabolic steroids. As a result, he was unable to compete in the 2012 Olympics.

== Death ==
In 2012, he was in a fight during a hunting trip in a mountainous area of Kermanshah, and was charged with murder for shooting a man to death. He committed suicide in Dizelabad prison in Kermanshah on 16 November 2014, by ingesting an aluminum phosphide caplet used for fumigation.
