= M. Bimoljit Singh =

Indian martial art athlete from Manipur

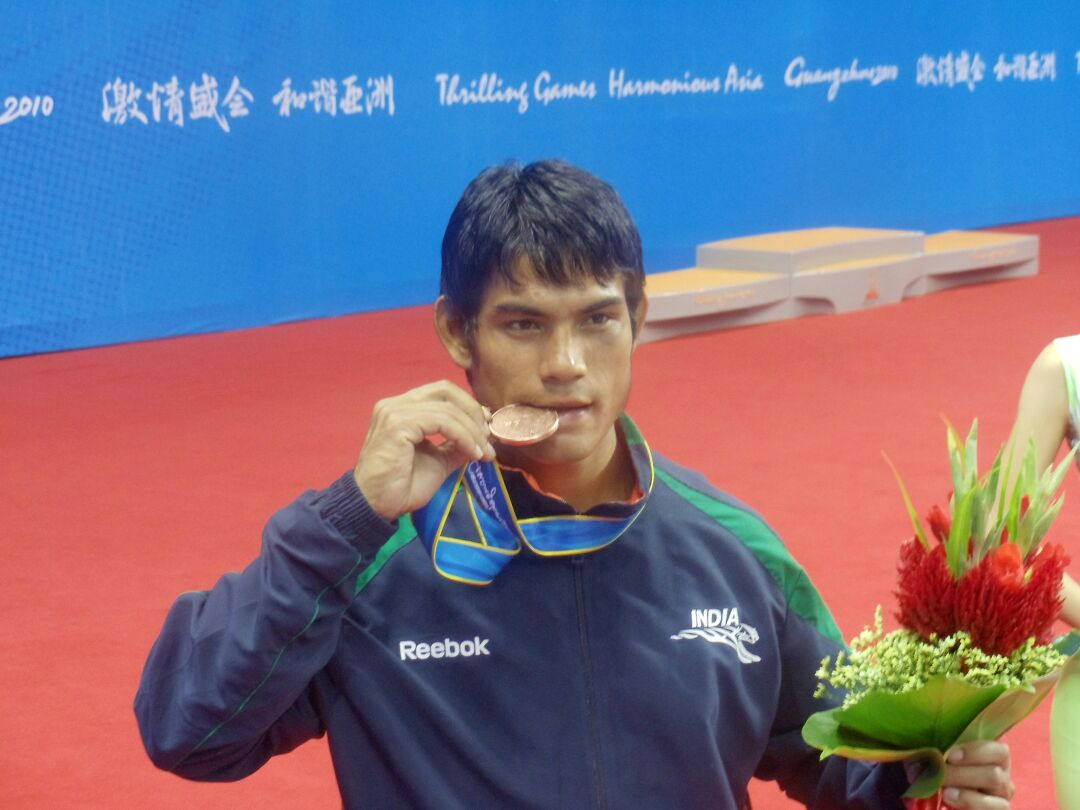
- Winning the Asian Games Bronze Medal in Wushu in 2010

Personal information
- Nationality: Indian
- Born: 1983 (age 42–43) Thoubal District, Manipur, India
- Weight: 60 kg (132 lb)

Sport
- Country: India
- Sport: Wushu
- Event: Sanda
Medal record
Men's Sanda
Representing India
Asian Games
Bronze medal – third place	2006 Doha	60 kg
Bronze medal – third place	2010 Guangzhou	60 kg

M. Bimoljit Singh, also known as Mayanglambam Bimoljit (born 1983), is an Indian born Wushu player from Kakching, Thoubal district in Manipur. Awarded the Arjun Award (for Wushu) in 2012 and Rajiv Gandhi State Award (for Wushu) in 2011, Bilmoljit is also a two times Asian Games Bronze Medalist 2006 and 2010, and a two times National Gold Medalist (2009 and 2011).

== Biography ==
=== Early life ===
Bimoljit was born as Mayanglambam Bimoljit Singh to Mayanglambam Naren Singh and Mayanglambam Ongbi Shakuntala Devi at Kakching, Turel Wangma, which is located in Thoubal District of Manipur. He is the fifth Child of his parents, with three brothers and two sisters above him. When he was 13 years old, he was introduced to Kungfu and earned a black belt under Kshetrimayum Jugeshwar Singh. This was a time when martial arts was not a popular sport in the country, and with little encouragement of the sport, as well as being economically deprived, Bimojit faced many difficulties during his early days. Financial constraints even made him to be deprived of many opportunities to participate in National and International competitions, although being selected to compete in the sport. However, through sheer determination, Bimoljit was able to secure more than 40 Gold medals in various District, State, North-East India, and National Level martial arts competitions.

=== Breakthrough ===
Through some suggestions made by a gentleman at Guwahati bus station, Bimoljit went to Arunachal Pradesh in September 2002 to set up his own Kung-Fu training Institute and popularize the sport. Despite difficulties, he was able to set up a Kungfu Institute, named “Shaolin Kung-Fu Training School” in Naharagun, a town in the Himalayan foothills in Arunachal Pradesh, and by 2004, the institute got affiliated to Indian Wushu Federation for Arunachal Pradesh. This recognition and support allowed him to participate in various Wushu competitions, and recognition came early for him in 2004 itself, when he won Gold in the first All India Invitation National Wushu Championship held at Mandi, Himachal, in 60 kg weight category. This brought him into the national limelight, and since then, his Wushu's career has taken off.

=== Achievements: 2005 – 2016 ===
Bimoljit joined CRPF in 2005, and serving in the army made him focus on Wushu practice with better and proper diet. Later he participated in Two National Games begging gold medals in both Games, Six National Championship begging 5 Golds, and 1 Silver and 12 times in International Championship with at least two gold medals including two consecutive bronze medals for India at 15th Asian games, Doha (lone Indian Wushu medalist), 2006 and 16th Guangzhou Asian Games, 2010. As he was the first and the lone Indian Wushu medalist at the Doha Asian Games, Ministry of Youth and Sports, Government of India recognized Wushu event in the priority list. For his exceptional contribution in Wushu sports, the Delhi Government conferred him with the ‘Rajiv Gandhi State Award’, in Delhi in 2011. He was also honored with Arjuna Award, the Nation's highest sports award in 2012 by the Government of India, for his effort, performance, and achievements, as well as popularizing Wushu Sport in India. As of 2016, in order to produce more players in this sport, and to bring out the significance of this sport, the Government of Manipur offered him to teach and to work as Coach at Regular Coaching Center (RCC), Youth Affairs Sports Department at Khuman Lampak in Imphal.

== Recognitions ==
- Arjun Award 2012 (WUSHU)
- Rajiv Gandhi State Award in Delhi 2011 (WUSHU)
