= Palestine at the 2010 Asian Games =

- IOC code: PLE
- NOC: Palestine Olympic Committee

in Guangzhou
- Competitors: 67 in 8 sports
- Medals Ranked 37th: Gold 0 Silver 0 Bronze 0 Total 0

Asian Games appearances (overview)
- 1990; 1994; 1998; 2002; 2006; 2010; 2014; 2018; 2022; 2026

The Palestine sent participants to the 16th Asian Games in Guangzhou, China. It did not win any medals.
