= 2010 Asian Games medal table =

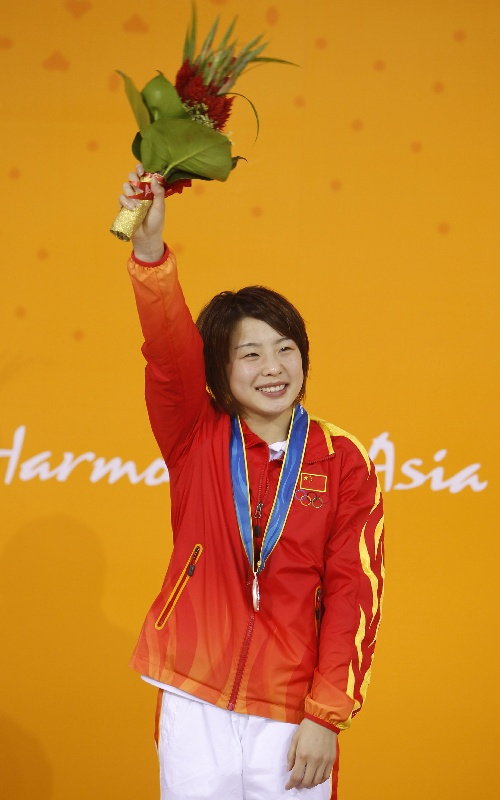
- Chinese diver Wang Hao smiling with her gold medal and flower bouquet at the 2010 Asian Games.
- Location: Guangzhou, China

Highlights
- Most gold medals: China 199
- Most total medals: China 416
- Medalling NOCs: 35

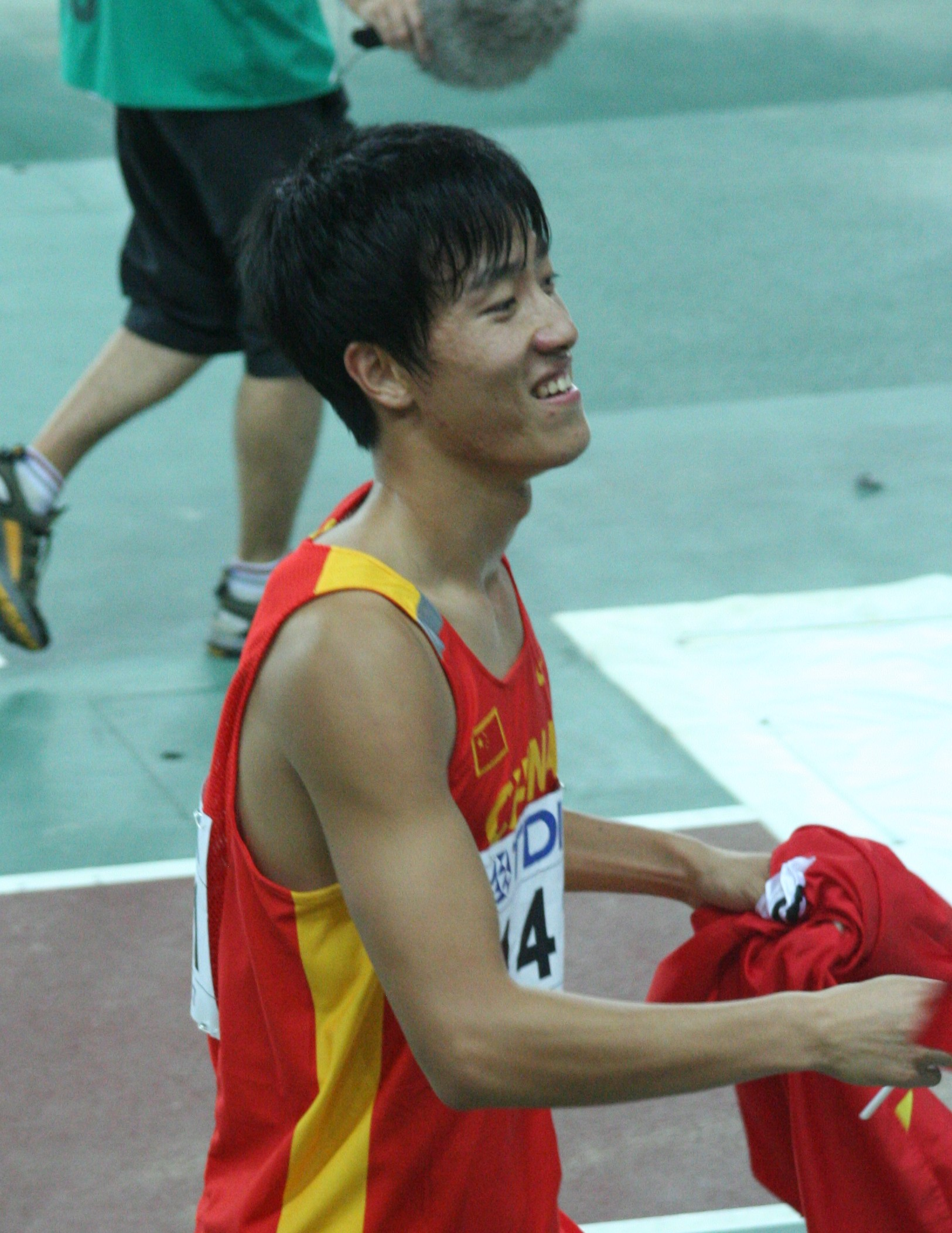
Liu Xiang from China won a gold medal in 110 metres hurdles.

The 2010 Asian Games, also known as the XVI Asiad, was a multi-sport event held in Guangzhou, China from 12 to 27 November 2010. The event saw 9,704 athletes from 45 National Olympic Committees (NOCs) competing in 476 events in 42 sports. This medal table ranks the participating NOCs by the number of gold medals won by their athletes.

Athletes from 35 NOCs (Kuwait participated under the Olympic flag due to the suspension of its NOC) won medals, leaving 9 NOCs without a medal, and 29 of them won at least one gold medal. China led the medal table for the eighth consecutive time in the Asian Games. They led all the medal categories, winning the most gold medals (199), the most silver medals (119), the most bronze medals (98) and the most medals overall (416, 26% of all medals awarded). China became the first nation in the history of Asian Games to cross the 400 medal-mark in one edition. Macau and Bangladesh won their first Asian Games gold medals, from wushu and cricket, respectively.

== Medal table ==
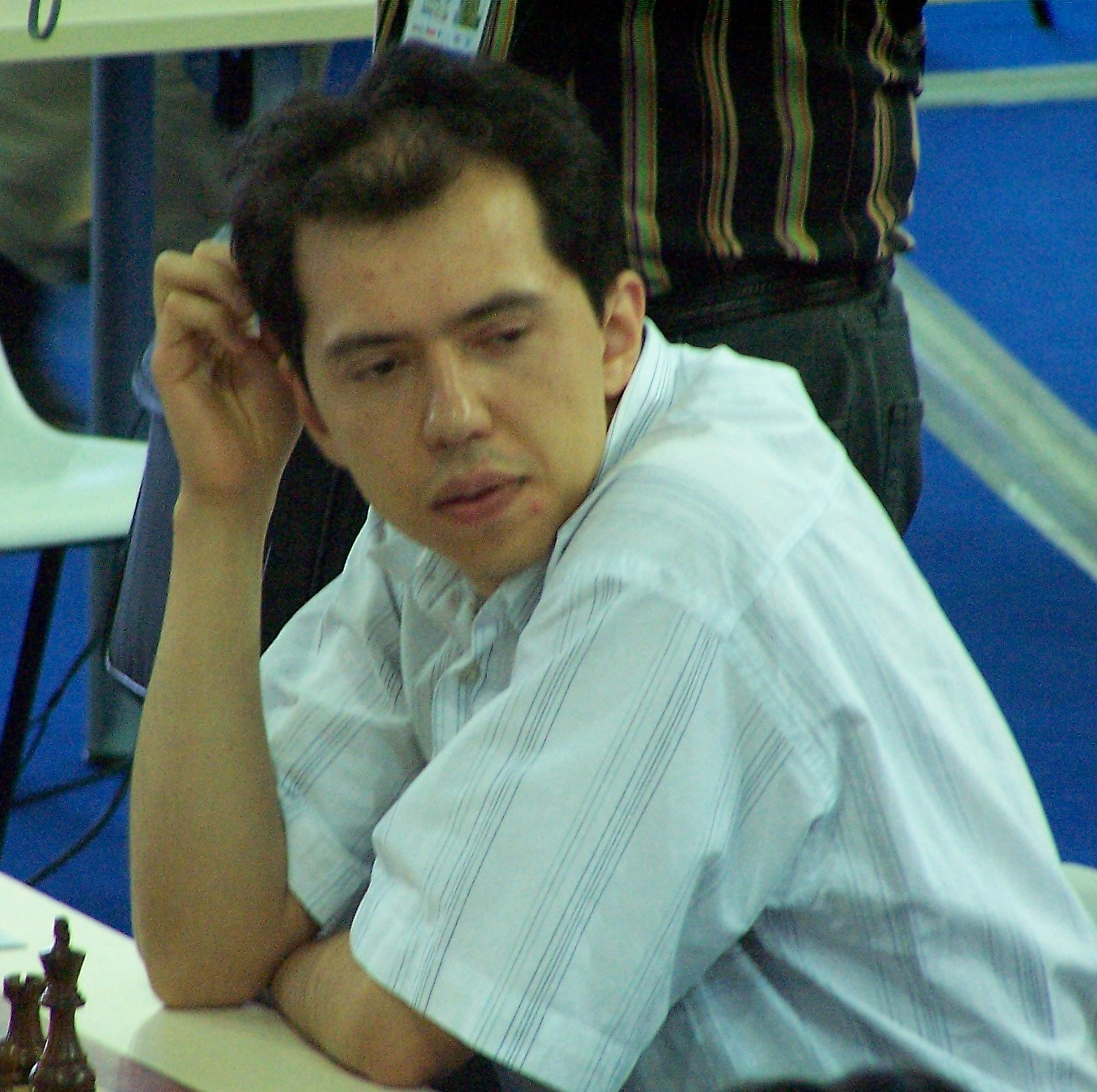
Rustam Kasimdzhanov from Uzbekistan won a gold medal in chess.

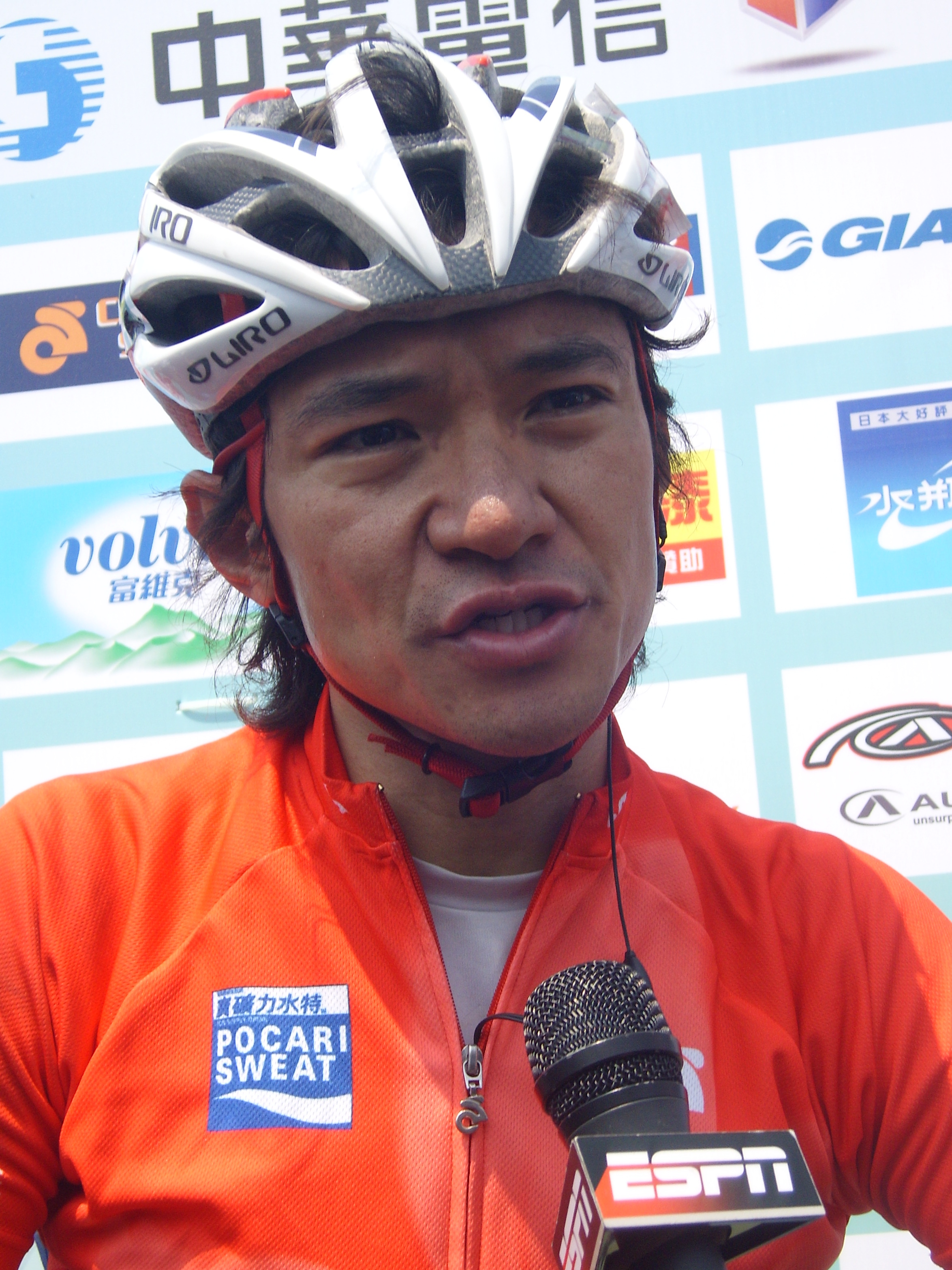
Wong Kam-po from Hong Kong won a gold medal in cycling – men's road race.

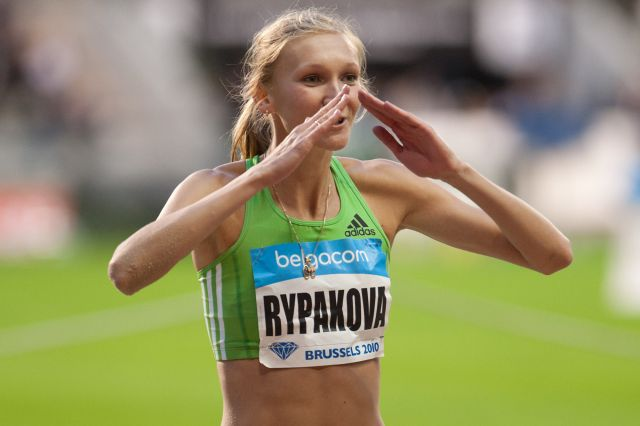
Olga Rypakova from Kazakhstan won a gold medal in triple jump and a silver in long jump.

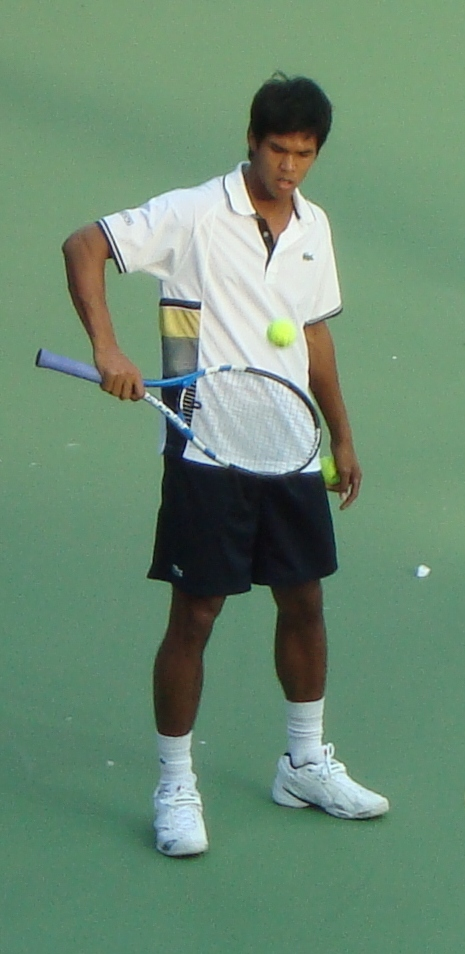
Somdev Devvarman from India won a gold medal in tennis men's single.

The ranking in this table is consistent with International Olympic Committee convention in its published medal tables. By default, the table is ordered by the number of gold medals the athletes from a nation have won (in this context, a "nation" is an entity represented by an NOC). The number of silver medals is taken into consideration next and then the number of bronze medals. If nations are still tied, equal ranking is given and they are listed alphabetically by IOC country code.

A total of 1,577 medals (477 gold, 479 silver and 621 bronze) were awarded. The total number of bronze medals is greater than the total number of gold or silver medals because two bronze medals were awarded per event in 15 sports: badminton, boxing, cue sports, fencing, judo, kabaddi, karate, sepaktakraw, soft tennis, squash, table tennis, taekwondo, tennis, wrestling, and wushu (except for taolu events).

This discrepancy is also caused by ties. In men's floor events in artistic gymnastics, there was a tie for the gold medal and no silver was awarded. There were also ties for the silver medal in men's 200 metres breaststroke in swimming, men's pole vault in athletics, and men's doubles in bowling. Thus, no bronzes were awarded in these events. Lastly, ties for third in both canoeing's men's K1 1000 metres and athletics' women's high jump, as well as a three-way tie for third in athletics' men's high jump, meant that multiple bronze medals were awarded for these events.

* Host nation (China)

Rank	NOC	Gold	Silver	Bronze	Total
1	China*	199	119	98	416
2	South Korea	76	65	91	232
3	Japan	48	74	94	216
4	Iran	20	15	24	59
5	Kazakhstan	18	23	38	79
6	India	14	17	34	65
7	Chinese Taipei	13	16	38	67
8	Uzbekistan	11	22	23	56
9	Thailand	11	9	32	52
10	Malaysia	9	18	14	41
11	Hong Kong	8	15	17	40
12	North Korea	6	10	20	36
13	Saudi Arabia	5	3	5	13
14	Bahrain	5	0	4	9
15	Indonesia	4	9	13	26
16	Singapore	4	7	6	17
17	Athletes from Kuwait	4	6	1	11
18	Qatar	4	4	7	15
19	Philippines	3	4	9	16
20	Pakistan	3	2	3	8
21	Mongolia	2	5	9	16
22	Myanmar	2	5	3	10
23	Jordan	2	2	2	6
24	Vietnam	1	17	15	33
25	Kyrgyzstan	1	2	2	5
26	Macau	1	1	4	6
27	Bangladesh	1	1	1	3
28	Tajikistan	1	0	3	4
29	Syria	1	0	1	2
30	United Arab Emirates	0	4	1	5
31	Afghanistan	0	2	1	3
32	Iraq	0	1	2	3
32	Lebanon	0	1	2	3
34	Laos	0	0	2	2
35	Nepal	0	0	1	1
35	Oman	0	0	1	1
Totals (36 entries)		477	479	621	1,577

== Changes in medal standings ==
Ruling date	Sport	Event	Nation	Gold	Silver	Bronze	Total
19 November 2010	Judo	Men's 81 kg	Uzbekistan		−1		−1
19 November 2010	Judo	Men's 81 kg	Japan		+1	−1	0
19 November 2010	Judo	Men's 81 kg	Kazakhstan		+1	−1	0
24 January 2011	Athletics	Men's discus throw	Qatar		–1		−1
24 January 2011	Athletics	Men's discus throw	Iran		+1	−1	0
24 January 2011	Athletics	Men's discus throw	India			+1	+1

On 19 November 2010, the Olympic Council of Asia (OCA) announced that Uzbek judoka Shokir Muminov had been stripped of his silver medal in the 81 kg bout after he tested positive for methylhexanamine. The two bronze medalists, Japan's Masahiro Takamatsu and Kazakhstan's Islam Bozbayev, were promoted as silver medalists.

On 24 January 2011, the OCA stripped Qatari Ahmed Dheeb of his silver medal in discus throw after he tested positive for exogenous testosterone metabolites. The bronze medalist, Iran's Mohammad Samimi was promoted as silver medalist and India's Vikas Gowda was promoted as bronze medalist.

== See also ==
- 2010 Asian Para Games medal table
