= Sepak takraw at the 2010 Asian Games =

- Venue: Haizhu Sports Center
- Dates: 16–27 November 2010
- Competitors: 172 from 10 nations

Sepak takraw was contested at the 2010 Asian Games in Guangzhou, China by both men and women from November 16 to 27 2010. The sepak takraw competition included the Team, Regu, and Doubles events, with all games taking place at Haizhu Sports Center. Each country, except the host country, was limited to two entries per gender.

== Schedule ==
●	Round	●	Last round	P	Preliminary round	½	Semifinals	F	Final

Event↓/Date →	16th Tue	17th Wed	18th Thu	19th Fri	20th Sat	21st Sun	22nd Mon	23rd Tue	24th Wed	25th Thu	26th Fri		27th Sat
Men's doubles										P	P	½	F
Men's regu							●	●	●				
Men's team regu	P	P	P	½	F								
Women's doubles										P	P	½	F
Women's regu							●	●	●				
Women's team regu	P	P	P	½	F								

== Medalists ==
=== Men ===
Event	Gold	Silver	Bronze
Doubles	Myanmar; Si Thu Lin; Zaw Latt; Zaw Zaw Aung	South Korea; Jeong Won-deok; Lee Gyu-nam; Lee Jun-ho	Japan; Yuichi Matsuda; Susumu Teramoto; Takeshi Terashima
Doubles	Myanmar; Si Thu Lin; Zaw Latt; Zaw Zaw Aung	South Korea; Jeong Won-deok; Lee Gyu-nam; Lee Jun-ho	Indonesia; Husni Uba; Jusri Pakke; Yudi Purnomo
Regu	Thailand; Anuwat Chaichana; Kriangkrai Kaewmian; Pornchai Kaokaew; Wirawut Nanongkhai; Pattarapong Yupadee	Malaysia; Futra Abd Ghani; Noor Azman Abd Hamid; Farhan Adam; Normanizam Ahmad; Nor Shahruddin Mad Ghani	Myanmar; Aung Cho Myint; Aung Myo Swe; Si Thu Lin; Zaw Latt; Zaw Zaw Aung
Regu	Thailand; Anuwat Chaichana; Kriangkrai Kaewmian; Pornchai Kaokaew; Wirawut Nanongkhai; Pattarapong Yupadee	Malaysia; Futra Abd Ghani; Noor Azman Abd Hamid; Farhan Adam; Normanizam Ahmad; Nor Shahruddin Mad Ghani	China; Ge Yusheng; Xu Mingchi; Yang Jiapeng; Zhang Linye; Zhou Haiyang
Team regu	Thailand; Anuwat Chaichana; Somporn Jaisinghol; Kriangkrai Kaewmian; Pornchai Kaokaew; Supachai Maneenat; Wirawut Nanongkhai; Suriyan Peachan; Suebsak Phunsueb; Siriwat Sakha; Singha Somsakul; Kritsana Tanakorn; Pattarapong Yupadee	Malaysia; Futra Abd Ghani; Noor Azman Abd Hamid; Farhan Adam; Normanizam Ahmad; Syazwan Husin; Mohd Helmi Ismail; Nor Shahruddin Mad Ghani; Mohd Hafizie Manap; Zulkarnain Arif; Ahmad Sufi Hashim; Azman Nasruddin; Ariff Ramli	Japan; Masanori Hayashi; Yoshitaka Iida; Yuichi Matsuda; Jun Motohashi; Tomoyuki Nakatsuka; Seiya Takano; Susumu Teramoto; Takeshi Terashima; Masahiro Yamada
Team regu	Thailand; Anuwat Chaichana; Somporn Jaisinghol; Kriangkrai Kaewmian; Pornchai Kaokaew; Supachai Maneenat; Wirawut Nanongkhai; Suriyan Peachan; Suebsak Phunsueb; Siriwat Sakha; Singha Somsakul; Kritsana Tanakorn; Pattarapong Yupadee	Malaysia; Futra Abd Ghani; Noor Azman Abd Hamid; Farhan Adam; Normanizam Ahmad; Syazwan Husin; Mohd Helmi Ismail; Nor Shahruddin Mad Ghani; Mohd Hafizie Manap; Zulkarnain Arif; Ahmad Sufi Hashim; Azman Nasruddin; Ariff Ramli	South Korea; Go Jae-uk; Im An-soo; Jeong Won-deok; Kim Young-man; Kwon Hyuk-jin; Lee Gyu-nam; Lee Jun-ho; Lee Myung-jung; Park Hyeon-geun; Sin Seung-tae; Woo Gyeong-han; Yoo Dong-young

=== Women ===
Event	Gold	Silver	Bronze
Doubles	Myanmar; Kyu Kyu Thin; May Zin Phyoe; Phyu Phyu Than	China; Cui Yonghui; Sun Xiaodan; Wang Xiaohua	South Korea; Ahn Soon-ok; Kim Mi-jin; Park Keum-duk
Doubles	Myanmar; Kyu Kyu Thin; May Zin Phyoe; Phyu Phyu Than	China; Cui Yonghui; Sun Xiaodan; Wang Xiaohua	Japan; Sawa Aoki; Yukie Sato; Chiharu Yano
Regu	Thailand; Tidawan Daosakul; Sunthari Rupsung; Phikun Seedam; Nareerat Takan; Daranee Wongcharern	Vietnam; Lại Thị Huyền Trang; Lưu Thị Thanh; Nguyễn Hải Thảo; Nguyễn Thị Bích Thủy; Nguyễn Thịnh Thu Ba	China; Cui Yonghui; Gu Xihui; Song Cheng; Wang Xiaohua; Zhou Ronghong
Regu	Thailand; Tidawan Daosakul; Sunthari Rupsung; Phikun Seedam; Nareerat Takan; Daranee Wongcharern	Vietnam; Lại Thị Huyền Trang; Lưu Thị Thanh; Nguyễn Hải Thảo; Nguyễn Thị Bích Thủy; Nguyễn Thịnh Thu Ba	Myanmar; Ei Thin Zar; Kay Zin Htut; Kyu Kyu Thin; May Zin Phyoe; Naing Naing Win
Team regu	Thailand; Tidawan Daosakul; Masaya Duangsri; Wanwisa Jankaen; Nitinadda Kaewkamsai; Kaewjai Pumsawangkaew; Sunthari Rupsung; Phikun Seedam; Payom Srihongsa; Nareerat Takan; Rungtip Tanaking; Nisa Thanaattawut; Daranee Wongcharern	China; Cui Yonghui; Gu Xihui; Lao Tianxue; Liu Xiaofang; Liu Yanhong; Song Cheng; Sun Xiaodan; Wang Xiaohua; Zhang Yanan; Zhao Tengfei; Zhou Ronghong	Indonesia; Aliya Prihatini; Asmira; Dini Mita Sari; Florensia Cristy; Hasmawati Umar; Jumasiah; Lena; Leni; Mega Citra Kusuma; Nur Qadriyanti; Rike Media Sari
Team regu	Thailand; Tidawan Daosakul; Masaya Duangsri; Wanwisa Jankaen; Nitinadda Kaewkamsai; Kaewjai Pumsawangkaew; Sunthari Rupsung; Phikun Seedam; Payom Srihongsa; Nareerat Takan; Rungtip Tanaking; Nisa Thanaattawut; Daranee Wongcharern	China; Cui Yonghui; Gu Xihui; Lao Tianxue; Liu Xiaofang; Liu Yanhong; Song Cheng; Sun Xiaodan; Wang Xiaohua; Zhang Yanan; Zhao Tengfei; Zhou Ronghong	Vietnam; Đinh Thị Thúy Hằng; Lại Thị Huyền Trang; Lê Thị Hạnh; Lưu Thị Thanh; Nguyễn Bạch Vân; Nguyễn Hải Thảo; Nguyễn Thị Bích Thủy; Nguyễn Thị Dung; Nguyễn Thị Hạnh Ngân; Nguyễn Thị Thuý An; Nguyễn Thịnh Thu Ba; Trương Thị Vân

== Medal table ==
Rank	Nation	Gold	Silver	Bronze	Total
1	Thailand (THA)	4	0	0	4
2	Myanmar (MYA)	2	0	2	4
3	China (CHN)	0	2	2	4
4	Malaysia (MAS)	0	2	0	2
5	South Korea (KOR)	0	1	2	3
6	Vietnam (VIE)	0	1	1	2
7	Japan (JPN)	0	0	3	3
8	Indonesia (INA)	0	0	2	2
Totals (8 entries)		6	6	12	24

== Participating nations ==
A total of 172 athletes from 10 nations competed in sepak takraw at the 2010 Asian Games:

- China (21)
- India (24)
- Indonesia (23)
- Japan (18)
- Malaysia (12)
- Myanmar (11)
- Philippines (3)
- South Korea (24)
- Thailand (24)
- Vietnam (12)
