= Cue sports at the 2010 Asian Games – Men's eight-ball singles =

Men's eight-ball singles at the 2010 Asian Games
- Venue: Asian Games Town Gymnasium
- Dates: 13–15 November 2010
- Competitors: 42 from 22 nations

Medalists
gold medal	Kuo Po-cheng	Chinese Taipei
silver medal	Ibrahim Amir	Malaysia
bronze medal	Irsal Nasution	Indonesia
bronze medal	Alok Kumar	India

The men's eight-ball singles tournament at the 2010 Asian Games in Guangzhou took place from 13 November to 15 November at the Asian Games Town Gymnasium.

== Schedule ==
All times are China Standard Time (UTC+08:00)

Date	Time	Event
Saturday, 13 November 2010	13:00	Preliminary
Saturday, 13 November 2010	19:00	Last 32
Sunday, 14 November 2010	10:00	Last 16
Sunday, 14 November 2010	13:00	Quarterfinals
Sunday, 14 November 2010	20:00	Semifinals
Monday, 15 November 2010	13:00	Final

== Results ==
Legend

- WO — Won by walkover

=== Finals ===
Semifinals			Final
	Ibrahim Amir (MAS)	7
	Irsal Nasution (INA)	5		Ibrahim Amir (MAS)	4
3	Kuo Po-cheng (TPE)	7	3	Kuo Po-cheng (TPE)	7
	Alok Kumar (IND)	5

=== Top half ===
==== Section 1 ====
Preliminary
Mohammed Al-Hazmi (KSA)	0
Li Hewen (CHN)	7
Lee Chen Man (HKG)	7
Abbas Saeed (MDV)	1
Jeong Young-hwa (KOR)	3
Omar Al-Shaheen (IOC)	7

Last 32
1	Hisataka Kamihashi (JPN)	7
Li Hewen (CHN)	4
Mohammed Al-Binali (QAT)	4
Ibrahim Amir (MAS)	7
Nader Khan Sultani (AFG)	7
Lee Chen Man (HKG)	6
Omar Al-Shaheen (IOC)	7
Lkhagvabazaryn Mönkhbold (MGL)	3

Last 16
1	Hisataka Kamihashi (JPN)	6
Ibrahim Amir (MAS)	7
Nader Khan Sultani (AFG)	2
Omar Al-Shaheen (IOC)	7

Quarterfinals
Ibrahim Amir (MAS)	7
Omar Al-Shaheen (IOC)	4

==== Section 2 ====
Preliminary
Al-Muhtadee Billah (BRU)
Irsal Nasution (INA)	WO
Mazen Berjaoui (LIB)	5
Sumit Talwar (IND)	7

Last 32
Aga Navil Ibna Ekram (BAN)	4
Irsal Nasution (INA)	7
Nitiwat Kanjanasri (THA)	5
Nguyễn Phúc Long (VIE)	7
Firas Kamel (IRQ)
Ko Pin-yi (TPE)	WO
Sumit Talwar (IND)	7
4	Roberto Gomez (PHI)	5

Last 16
Irsal Nasution (INA)	7
Nguyễn Phúc Long (VIE)	5
Ko Pin-yi (TPE)	6
Sumit Talwar (IND)	7

Quarterfinals
Irsal Nasution (INA)	7
Sumit Talwar (IND)	4

=== Bottom half ===
==== Section 3 ====
Preliminary
Chan Keng Kwang (SIN)	5
Lee Kang (KOR)	7
Kwok Chi Ho (HKG)	4
Surathep Phoochalam (THA)	7

Last 32
3	Kuo Po-cheng (TPE)	7
Lee Kang (KOR)	4
Ayhab Hasan (IRQ)	7
Bashar Hussein (QAT)	6
Törsaikhany Amarjargal (MGL)	4
Tayef Quader (BAN)	7
Surathep Phoochalam (THA)	3
Khaled Al-Mutairi (IOC)	7

Last 16
3	Kuo Po-cheng (TPE)	7
Ayhab Hasan (IRQ)	2
Tayef Quader (BAN)	7
Khaled Al-Mutairi (IOC)	6

Quarterfinals
3	Kuo Po-cheng (TPE)	7
Tayef Quader (BAN)	1

==== Section 4 ====
Preliminary
Mohamad Ali Berjaoui (LIB)	5
Lương Chí Dũng (VIE)	7
Ahmed Shareef (MDV)	1
Liu Haitao (CHN)	7
Bahauddin Faqiri (AFG)	1
Alok Kumar (IND)	7

Last 32
Ricky Yang (INA)	7
Lương Chí Dũng (VIE)	1
Liu Haitao (CHN)	7
Masaaki Tanaka (JPN)	3
Lee Poh Soon (MAS)	7
Badr Al-Hamdan (KSA)	6
Alok Kumar (IND)	7
2	Efren Reyes (PHI)	3

Last 16
Ricky Yang (INA)	7
Liu Haitao (CHN)	5
Lee Poh Soon (MAS)	5
Alok Kumar (IND)	7

Quarterfinals
Ricky Yang (INA)	4
Alok Kumar (IND)	7
