= Cue sports at the 2010 Asian Games =

- Venue: Asian Games Town Gymnasium
- Dates: 13–20 November 2010
- Competitors: 191 from 28 nations

Cue sports at the 2010 Asian Games was held in Asian Games Town Gymnasium, Guangzhou, China from November 13 to 20, 2010.

== Schedule ==
P	Preliminary rounds	¼	Quarterfinals	½	Semifinals	F	Final

Event↓/Date →	13th Sat		14th Sun			15th Mon		16th Tue		17th Wed		18th Thu		19th Fri		20th Sat	
Men's three-cushion singles						P		¼	½	F							
Men's English billiards singles	P	¼	½		F												
Men's eight-ball singles	P		P	¼	½	F											
Men's nine-ball singles								P		P	¼	½	F				
Men's snooker singles												P		P	¼	½	F
Men's snooker team	P		¼			½	F										
Women's eight-ball singles			P							P	¼	½	F				
Women's nine-ball singles						P				P		¼	½	F			
Women's six-red snooker singles						P	¼	½	F								
Women's six-red snooker team	P	¼	½		F												

== Medalists ==
=== Men ===
Event	Gold	Silver	Bronze
Three-cushion singles	Tsuyoshi Suzuki; Japan	Joji Kai; Japan	Lý Thế Vinh; Vietnam
Three-cushion singles	Tsuyoshi Suzuki; Japan	Joji Kai; Japan	Dương Anh Vũ; Vietnam
English billiards singles	Pankaj Advani; India	Nay Thway Oo; Myanmar	Kyaw Oo; Myanmar
English billiards singles	Pankaj Advani; India	Nay Thway Oo; Myanmar	Peter Gilchrist; Singapore
Eight-ball singles	Kuo Po-cheng; Chinese Taipei	Ibrahim Amir; Malaysia	Irsal Nasution; Indonesia
Eight-ball singles	Kuo Po-cheng; Chinese Taipei	Ibrahim Amir; Malaysia	Alok Kumar; India
Nine-ball singles	Dennis Orcollo; Philippines	Warren Kiamco; Philippines	Jeong Young-hwa; South Korea
Nine-ball singles	Dennis Orcollo; Philippines	Warren Kiamco; Philippines	Ko Pin-yi; Chinese Taipei
Snooker singles	Marco Fu; Hong Kong	Ding Junhui; China	Dechawat Poomjaeng; Thailand
Snooker singles	Marco Fu; Hong Kong	Ding Junhui; China	Aditya Mehta; India
Snooker team	China; Ding Junhui; Liang Wenbo; Tian Pengfei	India; Brijesh Damani; Aditya Mehta; Yasin Merchant	Thailand; Noppadon Noppachorn; Ratchapol Pu-ob-orm; Thepchaiya Un-nooh
Snooker team	China; Ding Junhui; Liang Wenbo; Tian Pengfei	India; Brijesh Damani; Aditya Mehta; Yasin Merchant	Pakistan; Shahram Changezi; Imran Shahzad; Sohail Shahzad

=== Women ===
Event	Gold	Silver	Bronze
Eight-ball singles	Liu Shasha; China	Kim Ga-young; South Korea	Chang Shu-han; Chinese Taipei
Eight-ball singles	Liu Shasha; China	Kim Ga-young; South Korea	Chou Chieh-yu; Chinese Taipei
Nine-ball singles	Pan Xiaoting; China	Chou Chieh-yu; Chinese Taipei	Lin Yuan-chun; Chinese Taipei
Nine-ball singles	Pan Xiaoting; China	Chou Chieh-yu; Chinese Taipei	Fu Xiaofang; China
Six-red snooker singles	Chen Siming; China	Lai Hui-shan; Chinese Taipei	Ng On Yee; Hong Kong
Six-red snooker singles	Chen Siming; China	Lai Hui-shan; Chinese Taipei	Bi Zhuqing; China
Six-red snooker team	Hong Kong; Jaique Ip; Ng On Yee; So Man Yan	China; Bi Zhuqing; Chen Siming; Chen Xue	Chinese Taipei; Chan Ya-ting; Lai Hui-shan; Liu Shin-mei
Six-red snooker team	Hong Kong; Jaique Ip; Ng On Yee; So Man Yan	China; Bi Zhuqing; Chen Siming; Chen Xue	Thailand; Suweenut Maungin; Nicha Pathomekmongkhon; Maliwan Sangklar

== Medal table ==
Rank	Nation	Gold	Silver	Bronze	Total
1	China (CHN)	4	2	2	8
2	Hong Kong (HKG)	2	0	1	3
3	Chinese Taipei (TPE)	1	2	5	8
4	India (IND)	1	1	2	4
5	Japan (JPN)	1	1	0	2
5	Philippines (PHI)	1	1	0	2
7	Myanmar (MYA)	0	1	1	2
7	South Korea (KOR)	0	1	1	2
9	Malaysia (MAS)	0	1	0	1
10	Thailand (THA)	0	0	3	3
11	Vietnam (VIE)	0	0	2	2
12	Indonesia (INA)	0	0	1	1
12	Pakistan (PAK)	0	0	1	1
12	Singapore (SIN)	0	0	1	1
Totals (14 entries)		10	10	20	40

== Participating nations ==
A total of 191 athletes from 28 nations competed in cue sports at the 2010 Asian Games:

- Afghanistan (4)
- Athletes from Kuwait (10)
- Bangladesh (3)
- Brunei (1)
- China (13)
- Chinese Taipei (11)
- Hong Kong (8)
- India (17)
- Indonesia (2)
- Iran (3)
- Iraq (3)
- Japan (6)
- Kyrgyzstan (2)
- Lebanon (2)
- Malaysia (7)
- Maldives (6)
- Mongolia (10)
- Myanmar (2)
- Pakistan (5)
- Philippines (14)
- Qatar (6)
- Saudi Arabia (11)
- Singapore (6)
- South Korea (11)
- Syria (3)
- Thailand (14)
- United Arab Emirates (3)
- Vietnam (8)
