= Wushu at the 2010 Asian Games – Women's changquan =

Women's changquan at the 2010 Asian Games
- Venue: Nansha Gymnasium
- Dates: 16 November 2010
- Competitors: 14 from 14 nations

Medalists
gold medal	Geng Xiaoling	Hong Kong
silver medal	Sandi Oo	Myanmar
bronze medal	Susyana Tjhan	Indonesia
bronze medal	Yuki Hiraoka	Japan

The women's changquan competition at the 2010 Asian Games in Guangzhou, China was held on 16 November at the Nansha Gymnasium.

== Schedule ==
All times are China Standard Time (UTC+08:00)

Date	Time	Event
Tuesday, 16 November 2010	10:00	Final

== Results ==
Rank	Athlete	Score
1st place, gold medalist(s)	Geng Xiaoling (HKG)	9.75
2nd place, silver medalist(s)	Sandi Oo (MYA)	9.67
3rd place, bronze medalist(s)	Susyana Tjhan (INA)	9.66
3rd place, bronze medalist(s)	Yuki Hiraoka (JPN)	9.66
5	Dương Thúy Vi (VIE)	9.55
6	Khor Poh Chin (SIN)	9.35
7	Lei Weng Si (MAC)	9.29
8	Seo Hee-ju (KOR)	9.26
9	Ayapana Toshibala (IND)	7.83
10	Summy Lama (NEP)	7.81
11	Lee Ying Shi (BRU)	7.72
12	Soudaphone Chanlapheng (LAO)	7.52
13	Anel Sanatkyzy (KAZ)	7.29
14	Patricia Nseir (LIB)	7.28
