= Wushu at the 2010 Asian Games =

- Venue: Nansha Gymnasium
- Dates: 13–17 November 2010
- Competitors: 193 from 32 nations

Wushu was contested by both men and women at the 2010 Asian Games in Guangzhou, China from November 13 to 17, 2010. All events were held at Nansha Gymnasium.

== Schedule ==
●	Round	R	Round of 16	¼	Quarterfinals	½	Semifinals	F	Final

Event↓/Date →	13th Sat	14th Sun	15th Mon	16th Tue	17th Wed
Men's changquan	●				
Men's nanquan & nangun			●●		
Men's taijiquan & taijijian				●●	
Men's daoshu & gunshu		●●			
Men's sanshou 56 kg	R		¼	½	F
Men's sanshou 60 kg		R	¼	½	F
Men's sanshou 65 kg		R	¼	½	F
Men's sanshou 70 kg		R	¼	½	F
Men's sanshou 75 kg	R		¼	½	F
Women's changquan				●	
Women's nanquan & nandao	●●				
Women's taijiquan & taijijian			●●		
Women's jianshu & qiangshu		●●			
Women's sanshou 52 kg	R	¼		½	F
Women's sanshou 60 kg	R		¼	½	F

== Medalists ==
=== Men's taolu ===
Event	Gold	Silver	Bronze
Changquan	Yuan Xiaochao; China	Daisuke Ichikizaki; Japan	Ehsan Peighambari; Iran
Nanquan & Nangun	Huang Guangyuan; China	He Jingde; Hong Kong	Phạm Quốc Khánh; Vietnam
Taijiquan & Taijijian	Wu Yanan; China	Nguyễn Thanh Tùng; Vietnam	Hsiao Yung-jih; Chinese Taipei
Daoshu & Gunshu	Jia Rui; Macau	Lee Jong-chan; South Korea	Nguyễn Mạnh Quyền; Vietnam

=== Men's sanshou ===
Event	Gold	Silver	Bronze
56 kg	Li Xinjie; China	Phan Văn Hậu; Vietnam	Khwanyuen Chanthra; Thailand
56 kg	Li Xinjie; China	Phan Văn Hậu; Vietnam	Phoxay Aphailath; Laos
60 kg	Mohsen Mohammadseifi; Iran	Kim Jun-yul; South Korea	M. Bimoljit Singh; India
60 kg	Mohsen Mohammadseifi; Iran	Kim Jun-yul; South Korea	Nguyễn Minh Thông; Vietnam
65 kg	Zhang Junyong; China	Nguyễn Văn Tuấn; Vietnam	Mark Eddiva; Philippines
65 kg	Zhang Junyong; China	Nguyễn Văn Tuấn; Vietnam	Hyun Chang-ho; South Korea
70 kg	Zhang Yong; China	Cai Liang Chan; Macau	Vương Đình Khanh; Vietnam
70 kg	Zhang Yong; China	Cai Liang Chan; Macau	Sajjad Abbasi; Iran
75 kg	Hamid Reza Gholipour; Iran	Ijaz Ahmed; Pakistan	Jiang Chunpeng; China
75 kg	Hamid Reza Gholipour; Iran	Ijaz Ahmed; Pakistan	Magsarjavyn Batjargal; Mongolia

=== Women's taolu ===
Event	Gold	Silver	Bronze
Changquan	Geng Xiaoling; Hong Kong	Sandi Oo; Myanmar	Susyana Tjhan; Indonesia
Changquan	Geng Xiaoling; Hong Kong	Sandi Oo; Myanmar	Yuki Hiraoka; Japan
Nanquan & Nandao	Lin Fan; China	Ivana Ardelia Irmanto; Indonesia	Tai Cheau Xuen; Malaysia
Taijiquan & Taijijian	Chai Fong Ying; Malaysia	Ai Miyaoka; Japan	Wen Ching-ni; Chinese Taipei
Jianshu & Qiangshu	Kan Wencong; China	Zheng Tianhui; Hong Kong	Lee Wen-jung; Chinese Taipei

=== Women's sanshou ===
Event	Gold	Silver	Bronze
52 kg	E Meidie; China	Nguyễn Thị Bích; Vietnam	Elaheh Mansourian; Iran
52 kg	E Meidie; China	Nguyễn Thị Bích; Vietnam	Lee Jung-hee; South Korea
60 kg	Khadijeh Azadpour; Iran	Wangkhem Sandhyarani Devi; India	Wu Tzu-yi; Chinese Taipei
60 kg	Khadijeh Azadpour; Iran	Wangkhem Sandhyarani Devi; India	Paloy Barckkham; Laos

== Medal table ==
Rank	Nation	Gold	Silver	Bronze	Total
1	China (CHN)	9	0	1	10
2	Iran (IRI)	3	0	3	6
3	Hong Kong (HKG)	1	2	0	3
4	Macau (MAC)	1	1	0	2
5	Malaysia (MAS)	1	0	1	2
6	Vietnam (VIE)	0	4	4	8
7	South Korea (KOR)	0	2	2	4
8	Japan (JPN)	0	2	1	3
9	India (IND)	0	1	1	2
9	Indonesia (INA)	0	1	1	2
11	Myanmar (MYA)	0	1	0	1
11	Pakistan (PAK)	0	1	0	1
13	Chinese Taipei (TPE)	0	0	4	4
14	Laos (LAO)	0	0	2	2
15	Mongolia (MGL)	0	0	1	1
15	Philippines (PHI)	0	0	1	1
15	Thailand (THA)	0	0	1	1
Totals (17 entries)		15	15	23	53

== Participating nations ==
A total of 193 athletes from 32 nations competed in wushu at the 2010 Asian Games:

- Afghanistan (9)
- Bangladesh (4)
- Brunei (2)
- China (10)
- Chinese Taipei (8)
- Hong Kong (8)
- India (10)
- Indonesia (8)
- Iran (9)
- Japan (6)
- Jordan (1)
- Kazakhstan (3)
- Kyrgyzstan (7)
- Laos (9)
- Lebanon (4)
- Macau (11)
- Malaysia (8)
- Mongolia (2)
- Myanmar (4)
- Nepal (13)
- North Korea (2)
- Pakistan (4)
- Philippines (6)
- Singapore (5)
- South Korea (13)
- Sri Lanka (1)
- Tajikistan (1)
- Thailand (4)
- Turkmenistan (4)
- Uzbekistan (2)
- Vietnam (11)
- Yemen (4)
