= Cue sports at the 2010 Asian Games – Men's English billiards singles =

Men's English billiards singles at the 2010 Asian Games
- Venue: Asian Games Town Gymnasium
- Dates: 13–14 November 2010
- Competitors: 18 from 11 nations

Medalists
gold medal	Pankaj Advani	India
silver medal	Nay Thway Oo	Myanmar
bronze medal	Kyaw Oo	Myanmar
bronze medal	Peter Gilchrist	Singapore

The men's English billiards singles tournament at the 2010 Asian Games in Guangzhou took place from 13 November to 14 November at Asian Games Town Gymnasium.

== Schedule ==
All times are China Standard Time (UTC+08:00)

Date	Time	Event
Saturday, 13 November 2010	10:00	Preliminary
Saturday, 13 November 2010	13:00	Last 16
Saturday, 13 November 2010	19:00	Quarterfinals
Sunday, 14 November 2010	10:00	Semifinals
Sunday, 14 November 2010	13:00	Final

== Results ==
=== Final ===
Final
1	Pankaj Advani (IND)	3
	Nay Thway Oo (MYA)	2

=== Top half ===
Preliminary
Đỗ Hoàng Quân (VIE)	1
Ricky Yang (INA)	3

Last 16
1	Pankaj Advani (IND)	3
Ricky Yang (INA)	0
Reynaldo Grandea (PHI)	1
Praprut Chaithanasakun (THA)	3
Haitham Khalil (SYR)	0
Hwang Chul-ho (KOR)	3
Abdulmohsin Khamis (QAT)	0
4	Kyaw Oo (MYA)	3

Quarterfinals
1	Pankaj Advani (IND)	3
Praprut Chaithanasakun (THA)	2
Hwang Chul-ho (KOR)	0
4	Kyaw Oo (MYA)	3

Semifinals
1	Pankaj Advani (IND)	3
4	Kyaw Oo (MYA)	2

=== Bottom half ===
Preliminary
Nay Thway Oo (MYA)	3
Nguyễn Thanh Long (VIE)	0

Last 16
3	Peter Gilchrist (SIN)	3
Thawat Sujaritthurakarn (THA)	0
Omar Al-Kojah (SYR)	0
Baek Min-hu (KOR)	3
Ali Jalil (IRQ)	0
Mohanna Al-Obaidly (QAT)	3
Nay Thway Oo (MYA)	3
2	Geet Sethi (IND)	1

Quarterfinals
3	Peter Gilchrist (SIN)	3
Baek Min-hu (KOR)	0
Mohanna Al-Obaidly (QAT)	0
Nay Thway Oo (MYA)	3

Semifinals
3	Peter Gilchrist (SIN)	2
Nay Thway Oo (MYA)	3
