= Sepak takraw at the 2010 Asian Games – Women's doubles =

Women's doubles at the 2010 Asian Games
- Venue: Haizhu Sports Center
- Date: 25–27 November 2010
- Competitors: 18 from 6 nations

Medalists
gold medal	Myanmar
silver medal	China
bronze medal	South Korea
bronze medal	Japan

The women's double regu sepak takraw competition at the 2010 Asian Games in Guangzhou was held from 25 November to 27 November at the Haizhu Sports Center.

== Squads ==
China	India	Indonesia	Japan
Cui Yonghui; Sun Xiaodan; Wang Xiaohua	Ronita Devi Elangbam; Aruna Devi Mutum; Jimi Devi Okram	Asmira; Hasmawati Umar; Mega Citra Kusuma	Sawa Aoki; Yukie Sato; Chiharu Yano
Myanmar	South Korea		
Kyu Kyu Thin; May Zin Phyoe; Phyu Phyu Than	Ahn Soon-ok; Kim Mi-jin; Park Keum-duk		

== Results ==
All times are China Standard Time (UTC+08:00)

=== Preliminary ===
==== Group A ====
Pos	Team	Pld	W	L	SF	SA	SD	Pts	Qualification
1	Myanmar	2	2	0	4	1	+3	4	Semifinals
2	China	2	1	1	3	2	+1	2	Semifinals
3	India	2	0	2	0	4	−4	0	

Source: Results

Date	Time		Score		Set 1	Set 2	Set 3
25 Nov	14:30	India	0–2	China	7–21	12–21	
26 Nov	09:00	Myanmar	2–1	China	23–21	15–21	16–14
26 Nov	14:30	Myanmar	2–0	India	21–12	21–9	

==== Group B ====
Pos	Team	Pld	W	L	SF	SA	SD	Pts	Qualification
1	Japan	2	2	0	4	0	+4	4	Semifinals
2	South Korea	2	1	1	2	3	−1	2	Semifinals
3	Indonesia	2	0	2	1	4	−3	0	

Source: Results

Date	Time		Score		Set 1	Set 2	Set 3
25 Nov	14:30	Indonesia	1–2	South Korea	21–16	17–21	9–15
26 Nov	09:00	Japan	2–0	South Korea	21–17	21–19	
26 Nov	14:30	Japan	2–0	Indonesia	21–17	21–18	

=== Knockout round ===
Semifinals
26 November
Myanmar	2
South Korea	0
26 November
Japan	0
China	2

Final
27 November
Myanmar	2
China	1

==== Semifinals ====
Date	Time		Score		Set 1	Set 2	Set 3
26 Nov	19:30	Myanmar	2–0	South Korea	21–18	22–20	
26 Nov	19:30	Japan	0–2	China	11–21	18–21	

==== Final ====
Date	Time		Score		Set 1	Set 2	Set 3
27 Nov	10:30	Myanmar	2–1	China	21–15	14–21	17–16
