= Tjhan =

Tjhan is a surname. Notable people with the surname include:

- Siauw Giok Tjhan (1914–1981), Chinese Indonesian activist and politician
- Susyana Tjhan (born 1984), Indonesian former wushu taolu athlete
