= Sepak takraw at the 2010 Asian Games – Women's regu =

Women's regu at the 2010 Asian Games
- Venue: Haizhu Sports Center
- Date: 22–24 November 2010
- Competitors: 20 from 4 nations

Medalists
| gold medal | Thailand |
| silver medal | Vietnam |
| bronze medal | China |
| bronze medal | Myanmar |

The women's regu sepak takraw competition at the 2010 Asian Games in Guangzhou was held from 22 November to 24 November at the Haizhu Sports Center.

Four teams Thailand, Vietnam, Myanmar and China played in a round-robin competition, leaving no true championship game. Thailand won the gold medal after winning all three matches.

== Squads ==
| China | Myanmar | Thailand | Vietnam |
|---|---|---|---|
| Cui Yonghui; Gu Xihui; Song Cheng; Wang Xiaohua; Zhou Ronghong | Ei Thin Zar; Kay Zin Htut; Kyu Kyu Thin; May Zin Phyoe; Naing Naing Win | Tidawan Daosakul; Sunthari Rupsung; Phikun Seedam; Nareerat Takan; Daranee Wongcharern | Lại Thị Huyền Trang; Lưu Thị Thanh; Nguyễn Hải Thảo; Nguyễn Thị Bích Thủy; Nguyễn Thịnh Thu Ba |

== Results ==
All times are China Standard Time (UTC+08:00)

| Pos | Team | Pld | W | L | SF | SA | SD | Pts |
|---|---|---|---|---|---|---|---|---|
| 1 | Thailand | 3 | 3 | 0 | 6 | 1 | +5 | 6 |
| 2 | Vietnam | 3 | 2 | 1 | 5 | 2 | +3 | 4 |
| 3 | China | 3 | 1 | 2 | 2 | 5 | −3 | 2 |
| 4 | Myanmar | 3 | 0 | 3 | 1 | 6 | −5 | 0 |

Source: Results

| Date | Time | | Score | | Set 1 | Set 2 | Set 3 |
|---|---|---|---|---|---|---|---|
| 22 Nov | 14:30 | China | 0–2 | Thailand | 10–21 | 7–21 | |
| 22 Nov | 15:30 | Myanmar | 0–2 | Vietnam | 9–21 | 21–23 | |
| 23 Nov | 09:00 | China | 0–2 | Vietnam | 20–22 | 12–21 | |
| 23 Nov | 09:00 | Thailand | 2–0 | Myanmar | 21–9 | 21–19 | |
| 24 Nov | 09:00 | China | 2–1 | Myanmar | 21–17 | 12–21 | 15–13 |
| 24 Nov | 16:00 | Vietnam | 1–2 | Thailand | 15–21 | 21–14 | 11–15 |
