= Wushu at the 2010 Asian Games – Men's sanshou 56 kg =

Men's sanshou 56 kg at the 2010 Asian Games
- Venue: Nansha Gymnasium
- Dates: 13–17 November 2010
- Competitors: 14 from 14 nations

Medalists
gold medal	Li Xinjie	China
silver medal	Phan Văn Hậu	Vietnam
bronze medal	Khwanyuen Chanthra	Thailand
bronze medal	Phoxay Aphailath	Laos

The men's sanshou 56 kilograms competition at the 2010 Asian Games in Guangzhou, China was held from 13 November to 17 November at the Nansha Gymnasium.

A total of fourteen competitors from fourteen countries competed in this event, limited to fighters whose body weight was less than 56 kilograms.

Li Xinjie from China won the gold medal after beating Phan Văn Hậu of Vietnam in gold medal bout 2–0, Li won both periods by the same score of 5–0. The bronze medal was shared by Khwanyuen Chanthra from Thailand and Phoxay Aphailath of the Lao People's Democratic Republic.

Athletes from Afghanistan (Khalid Hotak), South Korea (Lim Seung-chang), Macau (Wong Man Kuan) and Kyrgyzstan (Mirbek Suiumbaev) shared the fifth place. Athletes from Nepal, India, Hong Kong, Philippines, Uzbekistan and Yemen lost in the first round and didn't advance to the next round.

== Schedule ==
All times are China Standard Time (UTC+08:00)

Date	Time	Event
Saturday, 13 November 2010	19:30	Round of 16
Monday, 15 November 2010	19:30	Quarterfinals
Tuesday, 16 November 2010	19:30	Semifinals
Wednesday, 17 November 2010	19:30	Final

== Results ==
Legend

- AV — Absolute victory

Round of 16
Khwanyuen Chanthra (THA)	2
Raj Kumar Rasaili (NEP)	0
Lim Seung-chang (KOR)	2
Benjie Rivera (PHI)	0
Wong Ting Hong (HKG)	0
Li Xinjie (CHN)	2
Santosh Kumar (IND)	0
Khalid Hotak (AFG)	2
Jamoliddin Salimjonov (UZB)
Phan Văn Hậu (VIE)	AV
Phoxay Aphailath (LAO)	2
Naji Al-Ashwal (YEM)	0

Quarterfinals
Mirbek Suiumbaev (KGZ)	0
Khwanyuen Chanthra (THA)	2
Lim Seung-chang (KOR)	0
Li Xinjie (CHN)	2
Khalid Hotak (AFG)	0
Phan Văn Hậu (VIE)	2
Phoxay Aphailath (LAO)	2
Wong Man Kuan (MAC)	0

Semifinals
Khwanyuen Chanthra (THA)	0
Li Xinjie (CHN)	2
Phan Văn Hậu (VIE)	2
Phoxay Aphailath (LAO)	1

Final
Li Xinjie (CHN)	2
Phan Văn Hậu (VIE)	0
