= Indonesia at the 2010 Asian Games =

- IOC code: INA
- NOC: Indonesian Olympic Committee
- Website: www.nocindonesia.or.id (in English)

in Guangzhou
- Competitors: 216 in 26 sports
- Flag bearer: Ade Candra Rachmawan
- Medals Ranked 15th: Gold 4 Silver 9 Bronze 13 Total 26

Asian Games appearances (overview)
- 1951; 1954; 1958; 1962; 1966; 1970; 1974; 1978; 1982; 1986; 1990; 1994; 1998; 2002; 2006; 2010; 2014; 2018; 2022; 2026

Indonesia participated in the 2010 Asian Games in Guangzhou, China on 12–27 November 2010. Indonesia is one of eleven countries which have participated in the Asian games since the first Asian Games in 1951, and one of only ten countries that have taken part in every Asian Games.

Indonesia sent 216 athletes (of whom 122 are men) which competed in 26 sports.

== Competitors ==
Sport	Men	Women	Total
Archery	0	4	4
Athletics	7	2	9
Badminton	10	10	20
Beach Volleyball	4	0	4
Billiards sports	2	0	2
Bowling	6	6	12
Boxing	2	0	2
Canoe/Kayak Sprint	4	2	6
Chess	1	1	2
Cycling Road	2	2	4
Cycling Track	0	2	4
Dragon Boat	24	23	47
Diving	2	3	5
Fencing	1	1	2
Karate	4	4	8
Rowing	5	4	9
Sailing	3	2	5
Sepaktakraw	3	2	5
Shooting	0	3	3
Swimming	6	0	6
Tennis	0	4	4
Taekwondo	4	2	6
Volleyball	12	0	12
Weightlifting	3	4	7
Wrestling	4	0	4
Wushu	4	4	8
Total	122	94	216

== Medals ==
=== Medal table ===
Sport	Gold	Silver	Bronze	Total
Dragon Boat	3	3	0	6
Badminton	1	0	3	4
Weightlifting	0	1	3	4
Karate	0	1	2	3
Wushu	0	1	1	2
Bowling	0	1	0	1
Cycling Road	0	1	0	1
Sailing	0	1	0	1
Sepaktakraw	0	0	2	2
Cue Sports	0	0	1	1
Taekwondo	0	0	1	1
Total	4	9	13	26

=== Medalists ===
Medal	Name	Sport	Event
Gold	Abdul Azis; Ajurahman; Alkarmani; Arifriyadi; Asep Hidayat; Asnawir; Iwan Husin; Jaslin; Marjuki; Jhon Matulessy; Spens Stuber Mehue; Erwin Monim; Muchlis; Eka Octarianus; Pendrota Putra Kusuma; Ikhwan Randi; Didin Rusdiana; Silo; Japerry Siregar; Andri Sugiarto; Ahmad Supriadi; Dedi Kurniawan Suyatno; Syarifuddin; Anwar Tarra	Dragon boat	Men's 1000 m
Gold	Abdul Azis; Ajurahman; Alkarmani; Arifriyadi; Asep Hidayat; Asnawir; Iwan Husin; Jaslin; Marjuki; Jhon Matulessy; Spens Stuber Mehue; Erwin Monim; Muchlis; Eka Octarianus; Pendrota Putra Kusuma; Ikhwan Randi; Didin Rusdiana; Silo; Japerry Siregar; Andri Sugiarto; Ahmad Supriadi; Dedi Kurniawan Suyatno; Syarifuddin; Anwar Tarra	Dragon boat	Men's 500 m
Gold	Abdul Azis; Ajurahman; Alkarmani; Arifriyadi; Asep Hidayat; Asnawir; Iwan Husin; Jaslin; Marjuki; Jhon Matulessy; Spens Stuber Mehue; Erwin Monim; Muchlis; Eka Octarianus; Pendrota Putra Kusuma; Ikhwan Randi; Didin Rusdiana; Silo; Japerry Siregar; Andri Sugiarto; Ahmad Supriadi; Dedi Kurniawan Suyatno; Syarifuddin; Anwar Tarra	Dragon boat	Men's 250 m
Gold	Markis Kido; Hendra Setiawan	Badminton	Men's doubles
Silver	Ivana Ardelia Irmanto	Wushu	Women's Nanquan & Nandao
Silver	Sinta Darmariani	Weightlifting	Women's 69 kg
Silver	Wina Apriani; Sarce Aronggear; Fitri Ayu; Dayumin; Astri Dwijayanti; Yulanda Ester Entong; Farida; Raudani Fitra; Hasnah; Tika Inderiyani; Yunita Kadop; Masripah; Minawati; Ririn Nurparida; Cici Pramita; Royani Rais; Riska Elpia Ramadani; Rasima; Salwiah; Kanti Santyawati; Novita Sari; Suhartati; Wahyuni; Since Litashova Yom	Dragon boat	Women's 1000 m
Silver	Wina Apriani; Sarce Aronggear; Fitri Ayu; Dayumin; Astri Dwijayanti; Yulanda Ester Entong; Farida; Raudani Fitra; Hasnah; Tika Inderiyani; Yunita Kadop; Masripah; Minawati; Ririn Nurparida; Cici Pramita; Royani Rais; Riska Elpia Ramadani; Rasima; Salwiah; Kanti Santyawati; Novita Sari; Suhartati; Wahyuni; Since Litashova Yom	Dragon boat	Women's 500 m
Silver	Wina Apriani; Sarce Aronggear; Fitri Ayu; Dayumin; Astri Dwijayanti; Yulanda Ester Entong; Farida; Raudani Fitra; Hasnah; Tika Inderiyani; Yunita Kadop; Masripah; Minawati; Ririn Nurparida; Cici Pramita; Royani Rais; Riska Elpia Ramadani; Rasima; Salwiah; Kanti Santyawati; Novita Sari; Suhartati; Wahyuni; Since Litashova Yom	Dragon boat	Women's 250 m
Silver	Oka Sulaksana	Sailing	Men's Mistral
Silver	Putty Insavilla Armein; Ivana Hie; Novie Phang; Sharon Adelina Liman Santoso; Tannya Roumimper	Bowling	Women's team of five
Silver	Santia Tri Kusuma	Cycling	Women's road race
Silver	Umar Syarief	Karate	Men's kumite +84 kg
Bronze	Jadi Setiadi	Weightlifting	Men's 56 kg
Bronze	Pia Zebadiah Bernadet; Lindaweni Fanetri; Adriyanti Firdasari; Shendy Puspa Irawati; Meiliana Jauhari; Maria Febe Kusumastuti; Nitya Krishinda Maheswari; Liliyana Natsir; Greysia Polii; Aprilia Yuswandari	Badminton	Women's team
Bronze	Tontowi Ahmad; Mohammad Ahsan; Taufik Hidayat; Markis Kido; Sony Dwi Kuncoro; Fran Kurniawan; Dionysius Hayom Rumbaka; Simon Santoso; Hendra Setiawan; Alvent Yulianto	Badminton	Men's team
Bronze	Irsal Afrinneza Nasution	Cue sports	Men's eight-ball singles
Bronze	Eko Yuli Irawan	Weightlifting	Men's 62 kg
Bronze	Triyatno	Weightlifting	Men's 69 kg
Bronze	Fransisca Valentina	Taekwondo	Women's 46 kg
Bronze	Susyana Tjhan	Wushu	Women's changquan
Bronze	Nur Qadri Yanti; Asmira; Mega Citra Kusuma; Florensia Cristy; Jumasiah; Lena; Leni; Aliya Prihatini; Hasmawati Umar; Dini Mitasari; Rike Media Sari	Sepak takraw	Women's team regu
Bronze	Mohammad Ahsan; Alvent Yulianto	Badminton	Men's doubles
Bronze	Faizal Zainuddin	Karate	Men's individual kata
Bronze	Donny Dharmawan	Karate	Men's kumite 60 kg
Bronze	Yudi Purnomo; Jusri Pakke; Husni Uba	Sepaktakraw	Men's doubles

== Archery ==
Women

Athlete	Event	Qualification		Round of 64	Round of 32	Round of 16	Quarterfinals	Semifinals	Final	
Athlete	Event	Score	Seed	Opposition Score	Opposition Score	Opposition Score	Opposition Score	Opposition Score	Opposition Score	Rank
Ika Yuliana Rochmawati	Individual	1319	13	Koshko (IRI) (39); W 4-2	Cheng (CHN) (9); L 3-7	Did not advance				
Erwina Safitri	Individual	1246	36	Saito (JPN) (17); W 4-0	Kumari (IND) (7); L 3-7	Did not advance				
Rina Dewi Puspitasari	Individual	1241	37	Did not advance						
Novia Nuraini	Individual	1213	41	Did not advance						
Ika Yuliana Rochmawati; Rina Dewi Puspitasari; Novia Nuraini	Team	3773	9			Mongolia (8); L 201-204	Did not advance			

== Athletics ==
Men

Athletes	Event	Heat		Semifinal		Final	
Athletes	Event	Result	Rank	Result	Rank	Result	Rank
Suryo Agung Wibowo	Men's 100 m	10.42	1 Q	10.10	1 Q	10.37	6
Franklin Ramses Burumi	Men's 100 m	10.63	5 q	10.55	6	did not advance	
Heru Astriyanto	Men's 400 m	48.29	6 SB	did not advance			
Agus Prayogo	Men's 5000m					14:04.29	10; PB
Agus Prayogo	Men's 10000m					29:25.77	9 PB
Yahuza	Men's Marathon					2:35:01	12
Fadlin; Suryo Agung Wibowo; Farrel Octaviandi; Franklin Ramses Burumi	Men's 4 × 100 m relay	39.78	3 PB			39.87	6

Women

Athletes	Event	Heat		Semifinal		Final	
Athletes	Event	Result	Rank	Result	Rank	Result	Rank
Triyaningsih	Women's 10000m					33:07.45	9
Triyaningsih	Women's Marathon					2:31:49	4 PB
Dedeh Erawati	Women's 100m Hurdles	13.20	2 PB			13.42	6

== Badminton ==
Men

Athlete	Event	Round of 32	Round of 16	Quarterfinals	Semifinals	Final	
Athlete	Event	Opposition Score	Opposition Score	Opposition Score	Opposition Score	Opposition Score	Rank
(4)Taufik Hidayat	Singles	Hsieh (TPE); W 21-18 21-16	Karunaratna (SRI); W 21-14 21-9	Park (KOR); L 15-21 16-21	Did not advance		
(7)Sony Dwi Kuncoro	Singles	Chou (TPE); L 13-21 21-14 17-21	Did not advance				
(2)Markis Kido; Hendra Setiawan	Doubles	Bye	Endo/Hayakawa (JPN); W 21-15 19-21 21-13	(8)Chen/Lin (TPE); W 17-21 21-12 21-13	(3)Jung/Lee (KOR); W 21-15 13-21 21-18	(1)Koo/Tan (MAS); W16-21 26-24 21-19	Gold medal
Mohammad Ahsan; Alvent Yulianto	Doubles	Sharim/Zayan (MDV); W 21-5 21-8	(4)Fang/Lee (TPE); W 21-14 16-21 21-9	(5)Guo/Xu (CHN); W 14-21 21-19 21-16	(1)Koo/Tan (MAS); L 21-19 21-16		3rd place, bronze medalist(s)
Taufik Hidayat; Markis Kido; Hendra Setiawan; Sony Dwi Kuncoro; Mohammad Ahsan; Alvent Yulianto; Simon Santoso	Team		Bye	Chinese Taipei (TPE); W 3-0	China (CHN); L 0-3		3rd place, bronze medalist(s)

Women

Athlete	Event	Round of 32	Round of 16	Quarterfinals	Semifinals	Final	
Athlete	Event	Opposition Score	Opposition Score	Opposition Score	Opposition Score	Opposition Score	Rank
Adriyanti Firdasari	Singles	Ponsana (THA); W 21-18 16-21 21-15	(8)Wong (MAS); L 19-21 18-21	Did not advance			
Maria Febe Kusumastuti	Singles	Bye	Pai (TPE); L 16-21 11-21|	Did not advance			
(7)Meiliana Jauhari; Greysia Polii	Doubles	Bye	Hsieh/Wang (TPE); L 19-21 18-21|	Did not advance			
Shendy Puspa Irawati; Nitya Krishinda Maheswari	Doubles	Poon/Tse (HKG); W 21-16 15-21 21-18	(5)Wang/Yu (CHN); L 10-21 11-21	Did not advance			
Adriyanti Firdasari; Greysia Polii; Meiliana Jauhari; Maria Febe Kusumastuti; Lilyana Natsir; Nitya Krishinda Maheswari; Lindaweni Fanetri	Team		India (IND); W 3-2	Chinese Taipei (TPE); W 3-0	Thailand (THA); L 1-3		3rd place, bronze medalist(s)

Mixed

Athlete	Event	Round of 32	Round of 16	Quarterfinals	Semifinals	Final	
Athlete	Event	Opposition Score	Opposition Score	Opposition Score	Opposition Score	Opposition Score	Rank
Tontowi Ahmad; Lilyana Natsir	Doubles	Koo/Woon (MAS); W 21-10 21-9	Chen/Cheng (TPE); L 17-21 15-21	Did not advance			
(6)Fran Kurniawan Teng; Pia Zebadiah Bernadet	Doubles	Bye	He/Ma (CHN); L 21-15 18-21 16-21	Did not advance			

== Beach volleyball ==
=== Men ===
Athlete	Event	Preliminary Round			Round of 16	Quarterfinals	Semifinals	Finals
Athlete	Event	Opposition Score	Opposition Score	Opposition Score	Opposition Score	Opposition Score	Opposition Score	Opposition Score
Andy Ardiyansah; Koko Prasetyo Darkuncoro	Men's beach volleyball	Adeeb Mahfoudh (YEM) and Assar Mohammed (YEM); W 2-0 (24-22, 21-12)	Shinya Inoue (JPN) and Yoshiumi Hasegawa (JPN); W 2-0 (21-19, 21-15)		Wong Chun Wai (HKG) and Wong Kwun Pong (HKG); W 2-0 (21-19, 21-16)	Kentaro Asahi (JPN) and Katsuhiro Shiratori (JPN); L 0-2 (19-21, 12-21)	did not advance	
Dian Putra Santoso; Ade Candra Rachmawan	Men's beach volleyball	Lee Gwang-In (KOR) and Ko Jun-Yong (KOR); W 2-1 (15-21, 21-15, 15-9)	Khalifa Al-Jabri (OMA) and Abdullah Al-Rajhi (OMA); L 0-2 (17-21, 19-21)	Mahesh Perera (SRI) and Wasantha Rathnapala (SRI); W 2-1 (21-18, 18-21, 15-13)	Dmitriy Yakovlev (KAZ) and Alexey Kuleshov (KAZ); L 0-2 (16-21, 17-21)	did not advance		

== Bowling ==
Men

Athlete	Event	Score	Rank
Ryan Leonard Lalisang	Men's Singles	1363	8
Ryan Leonard Lalisang	Men's All Event	5317	5
Rangga Dwichandra Yudhira	Men's Singles	1240	39
Rangga Dwichandra Yudhira	Men's All Event	4835	61
Yeri Ramadona	Men's Singles	1193	61
Yeri Ramadona	Men's All Event	4991	37
Hengki I	Men's Singles	1122	80
Hengki I	Men's All Event	4803	63
Williem Widjaja	Men's Singles	1119	81
Williem Widjaja	Men's All Event	4646	73
Diwan Rezaldy Syahril	Men's Singles	916	100
Diwan Rezaldy Syahril	Men's All Event	4518	86
Ryan Leonard Lalisang; Rangga Dwichandra Yudhira	Men's Doubles	2607	7
Hengki I Yeri Ramadona	Men's Doubles	2518	16
Williem Widjaja; Diwan Rezaldy Syahril	Men's Doubles	2492	20
Ryan Leonard Lalisang; Rangga Dwichandra Yudhira; Hengki I	Men's Trios	3688	-
Yeri Ramadona; Williem Widjaja; Diwan Rezaldy Syahril	Men's Trios	3517	-
Ryan Leonard Lalisang; Rangga Dwichandra Yudhira; Hengki I Yeri Ramadona; Diwan Rezaldy Syahril	Men's Team of Five	6148	

Women

Athlete	Event	Score	Rank
Tannya Roumimper	Women's Singles	1300	7
Tannya Roumimper	Women's All Event	4972	12
Putty Insavilla Armein	Women's Singles	1219	12
Putty Insavilla Armein	Women's All Event	4839	27
Sharon Adelina Santoso	Women's Singles	1146	31
Sharon Adelina Santoso	Women's All Event	4659	39
Novie Phang	Women's Singles	1008	59
Novie Phang	Women's All Event	4851	25
Lvana Hie	Women's Singles	996	61
Lvana Hie	Women's All Event	4587	43
Shalima Zalsha	Women's Singles	996	61
Shalima Zalsha	Women's All Event	4513	50
Tannya Roumimper; Putty Insavilla Armein	Women's Doubles	2465	12
Novie Phang; Lvana Hie	Women's Doubles	2326	22
Sharon Adelina Santoso; Shalima Zalsha	Women's Doubles	2321	23
Tannya Roumimper; Putty Insavilla Armein; Sharon Adelina Santoso	Women's Trios		-
Novie Phang; Lvana Hie; Shalima Zalsha	Women's Trios		-
Tannya Roumimper; Putty Insavilla Armein; Sharon Adelina Santoso; Novie Phang; Lvana Hie	Women's Team of Five	3171	2nd place, silver medalist(s)

== Boxing ==
Men

Athlete	Event	Round of 32	Round of 16	Quarterfinals	Semifinals	Final	
Athlete	Event	Opposition Score	Opposition Score	Opposition Score	Opposition Score	Opposition Score	Rank
Vinky Montolalu	Men's 64 kg	Bye	Svay (CAM); W 8-4	Masuk (THA); L 2-4	Did not advance		
Alex Tatontos	Men's 69 kg	Chang (TPE); L 4-13	Did not advance				

== Canoeing ==
Men

Athlete(s)	Event	Heats		Semifinal		Final	
Athlete(s)	Event	Time	Rank	Time	Rank	Time	Rank
Anwar Tarra	Men's C1 200m	44.592	5	43.969	4	Did not advance	
Anwar Tarra; Eka Octarorianus	Men's C2 1000m					3:52.673	5
Silo	Men's K1 200m	41.554	6	40.446	6	Did not advance	
Silo; Muchlis	Men's K2 200m	37.017	5	37.189	3	DNS	---
Silo; Muchlis	Men's K2 1000m	3:32.972	4	3:38.383	3	4:13.879	9

Women

Athlete(s)	Event	Heats		Semifinal		Final	
Athlete(s)	Event	Time	Rank	Time	Rank	Time	Rank
Sarce Aronggear	Women's K1 200m	48.030	4	45.270	2	45.420	7
Sarce Aronggear; Roslina	Women's K2 500m	1:56.237	3			1:53.966	8

== Chess ==
Men

Athlete	Event	Played	Won	Draw	Lost	Points	Rank
Susanto Megaranto	Men's Individual	9	6	0	3	6.0	7

Women

Athlete	Event	Played	Won	Draw	Lost	Points	Rank
Irene Kharisma Sukandar	Women's Individual	9	4	2	3	5.0	12

== Cue Sports ==
Men

Athlete	Event	Round of 64	Round of 32	Round of 16	Quarterfinals	Semifinals	Final	
Athlete	Event	Opposition Score	Opposition Score	Opposition Score	Opposition Score	Opposition Score	Opposition Score	Rank
Irsal Afrinneza Nasution	8-Ball Pool Singles	Billah (BRU); W 7-0	Ekram (BAN); W 7-4	Nguyen (VIE); W 7-5	Talwar (IND); W 7-4	Amir (MAS); L 5-7		3rd place, bronze medalist(s)
Irsal Afrinneza Nasution	9-Ball Pool Singles	Nguyen (VIE); L 6-9	Did not advance					
Ricky Yang	8-Ball Pool Singles	Bye	Chi (VIE); W 7-1	Liu (CHN); W 7-5	Kumar (IND); L 4-7	Did not advance		
Ricky Yang	9-Ball Pool Singles	Berjaoui (LIB); W 9-2	Sinha (BAN); W 9-4	Kamihashi (JPN); W 9-7	Ko (TPE); L 6-9	Did not advance		
Ricky Yang	English Billiard Singles		Do (VIE); W 3-1	Advani (IND); L 0-3	Did not advance			

== Cycling ==
=== Road ===
Men

Athletes	Event	Final	
Athletes	Event	Time	Rank
Dotty Cayank Topeng	Individual Time Trial	1:25:35.55	12
Dotty Cayank Topeng	Individual Road Race	---	DNF
Ryan Ariehaan Hilmant	Individual Road Race	4:15:07.76	23

Women

Athletes	Event	Final	
Athletes	Event	Time	Rank
Santia Tri Kusuma	Individual Road Race	2:47:46.52	Silver medal
Yanthi Fuchianty	Individual Road Race	2:47.48:35	9

=== Track ===
Women

Athletes	Event	Qualifying		Semifinal		Final	
Athletes	Event	Points/Time	Rank	Points/Time	Rank	Points/Time	Rank
Santia Tri Kusuma	500m Time Trial					37.265	8
Santia Tri Kusuma	Points Race					-10	11
Yanthi Fuchianty	Individual Pursuit	4:01.718	11	Did Not Advance			
Yanthi Fuchianty	Points Race					0	8

== Diving ==
Men

Athletes	Event	Qualifying		Final	
Athletes	Event	Points	Rank	Points	Rank
Muhammad Nasrullah	10m Platform	387.65	7	304.90	10
Muhammad Nasrullah; Husaini Noor	Synchronized 10m Platform			315.51	7

Women

Athletes	Event	Qualifying		Final	
Athletes	Event	Points	Rank	Points	Rank
Della Dinarsari	1m Springboard			200.70	11
Della Dinarsari	10m Platform	219.35	11	DNS	---
Sari Ambarwati	3m Springboard	227.40	8	199.35	10
Sari Ambarwati; Dinda Maria Natali	Synchronized 3m Springboard			215.04	6

== Dragon Boat ==
Men Team Member : Ajurahman, Alkarman, Arifriyadi, Asnawir, Abdul Azis, Asep Hidayat, Iwan Husin, Jaslin, Marjuki, John Matulessy, Spens Mehue, Erwin Monim, Muchlis, Eka Octarorianus, Pendrota Putra Kusuma, Ikhwan Randi, Didin Rusdiana, Silo, Japerry Siregar, Andri Sugiarto, Ahmad Supriadi, Dedi Suyatno, Syarifuddin, Anwar Tarra.

Athlete(s)	Event	Heats		Repechage		Final	
Athlete(s)	Event	Time	Rank	Time	Rank	Time	Rank
Indonesia	250m Straight Race	49.425	1			48.681	Gold medal
Indonesia	500m Straight Race	1:45.897	1			1:44.506	Gold medal
Indonesia	1000m Straight Race	3:40.240	1			3:32.016	Gold medal

Women Team Member : Wina Apriani, Sarce Aronggear, Dayumin, Astri Dwijayanti, Yulanda Entong, Farida, Raudani Fitra, Fitri Ayu, Hasnah, Tika Inderiyani, Yunita Kadop, Masripah, Minawati, Novita Sari, Ririn Nurfarida, Cici Paramida, Riska Ramadani, Rasima, Salwiah, Kanti Santyanti, Suhartati, Wahyni, Since Yom.

Athlete(s)	Event	Heats		Repechage		Final	
Athlete(s)	Event	Time	Rank	Time	Rank	Time	Rank
Indonesia	250m Straight Race	1:00.886	1			59.458	Silver medal
Indonesia	500m Straight Race	2:01.600	2	2:07.321	1	2:02.875	Silver medal
Indonesia	1000m Straight Race	4:15.363	2	4:26.528	1	4:14.590	Silver medal

== Fencing ==
Men

Athletes	Event	Qualifying		Round of 32	Round of 16	Quarterfinal	Semifinal	Final	
Athletes	Event	Win–loss Ratio	Rank	Opposition Score	Opposition Score	Opposition Score	Opposition Score	Opposition Score	Rank
Sinatrio Raharjo	Individual Foil	0.333 (2W-4L)	19	Abu Assaf (JOR); L 14-15	Did Not Advance				

Women

Athletes	Event	Qualifying		Round of 16	Quarterfinal	Semifinal	Final	
Athletes	Event	Win–loss Ratio	Rank	Opposition Score	Opposition Score	Opposition Score	Opposition Score	Rank
Diah Permatasari	Individual Sabre	0.4000 (2W-3L)	12	Lee (SIN); L 11-15	Did Not Advance			

== Karate ==
Men

Athletes	Event	Round of 32	Round of 16	Quarterfinal	Semifinal	Final	
Athletes	Event	Opposition Score	Opposition Score	Opposition Score	Opposition Score	Opposition Score	Rank
Faisal Zainuddin	Individual Kata		Rayappan (SRI); W 5-0	Abdullah (UAE); W 4-1	Ku (MAS); L 1-4	Repechage Bronze; Cheng (HKG); W 4-1	Bronze medal
Donny Dharmawan	Kumite -60 kg	Bye	Al-Najjar (JOR); L 5-7	Repechage Round 1 Cheung (HKG); W 4-3	Repechage Round 2 Dong (CHN); W 7-2	Repechage Bronze; Mukhsimov (UZB); W 5-2	Bronze medal
Jintar Simanjuntak	Kumite -67 kg	Bye	Lee (KOR); L 2-3	Did Not Advance			
Umar Syarief	Kumite -84 kg		Bye	Lei (MAC); W DQ	Li (CHN); W 3-0	Poursheib (IRI); L 3-7	Silver medal

Women

Athletes	Event	Round of 16	Quarterfinal	Semifinal	Final	
Athletes	Event	Opposition Score	Opposition Score	Opposition Score	Opposition Score	Rank
Dewi Yulianti	Individual Kata	Prue (BAN); W 5-0	Niyazova (UZB); W 5-0	Usami (JPN); L 0-5	Repechage Bronze; Lim (MAS); L 0-5	5
Martinel Prihastuti	Kumite -50 kg	Jang (KOR); L 0-2	Did Not Advance			
Tantri Widyasari	Kumite -61 kg	Mirzaeva (UZB); L 1-5	Did Not Advance			
Yulanda Asmuruf	Kumite -68 kg	Bye	Kaspulatova (UZB); W 7-4	Honma (JPN); L 1-3	Repechage Bronze; Malekipour (IRI); L 3-7	5

== Rowing ==
Men

Athlete	Event	Heats		Repechage		Final	
Athlete	Event	Time	Rank	Time	Rank	Time	Rank
Anang Mulyana	Single Sculls	7:13.04	3rd QR	7:27.62	4th	did not advance	
Ag Us Budy Aji; Iswandi Iswandi; Jamaluddin Jamaluddin; Mochammad Al I Darta Lakiki	Lightweight Coxless Four	6:18.80	3rd QF	auto advancement		6:16.34	4th

Women

Athlete	Event	Heats		Repechage		Final	
Athlete	Event	Time	Rank	Time	Rank	Time	Rank
Femmy Yuartini Elia; Ratna Ratna	Coxless Pair	7:53.91	4th QF	auto advancement		7:48.64	4th
Femmy Yuartini Elia; Ratna Ratna; Femy Batuwael; Femmy Yuartini Elia	Coxless Four	7:02.48	3rd QF	auto advancement		7:11.91	6th

== Sailing ==
Men

Athlete	Event	Race												Total	Rank
Athlete	Event	1	2	3	4	5	6	7	8	9	10	11	12	Total	Rank
I Gusti Made Oka Sulaksana	Mistral	2	2	1	2	~~4~~	1	3	1	1	4	4	2	23	2nd place, silver medalist(s)
Ario Subagio; Sujatmiko Sujatmiko	Hobie-16	~~8~~	7.5	5	7	7	5	6	6	4	7	7	7	68.5	7

Women

Athlete	Event	Race												Total	Rank
Athlete	Event	1	2	3	4	5	6	7	8	9	10	11	12	Total	Rank
Hoiriyah	Mistral	4	4	4	4	4	4	4	4	4	~~5~~	4	4	44	4
Ratiah	RS:X	5	~~RAF~~	DNF	DNF	4	4	4	4	4	5	4	5	51	4

== Shooting ==
Women

Athletes	Event	Final	
Athletes	Event	Points	Rank
Erlinawati	50m Rifle Prone	582-25x	25
Maharani Ardy	50m Rifle Prone	580-26x	31
Saraswati Rachma	50m Rifle Prone	575-22x	42
Erlinawati; Maharani Ardy; Saraswati Rachma	50m Rifle Prone Team	1737-73x	11

== Swimming ==
Men

Athletes	Event	Qualifying			Swim-Off		Final	
Athletes	Event	Time	Rank	Overall	Time	Rank	Time	Rank
Guntur Pratama Putera	50m Freestyle	24.41	3	27	Did Not Advance			
Guntur Pratama Putera	100m Freestyle	52.85	7	26	Did Not Advance			
Guntur Pratama Putera	100m Backstroke	1:04.81	8	26	Did Not Advance			
Guntur Pratama Putera	50m Butterfly	25.14	4	10	Did Not Advance			
Guntur Pratama Putera	100m Butterfly	56.43	1	17	Did Not Advance			
Glenn Victor Sutanto	50m Backstroke	26.56	3	8			26.31	7
Glenn Victor Sutanto	100m Backstroke	1:04.11	7	25	Did Not Advance			
Glenn Victor Sutanto	50m Butterfly	24.84	4	8	25.04	2	Did Not Advance	
Glenn Victor Sutanto	100m Butterfly	54.70	3	9	Did Not Advance			
Triady Fauzi Sidiq	100m Freestyle	52.22	6	19	Did Not Advance			
Triady Fauzi Sidiq	200m Freestyle	1:54.51	6	15	Did Not Advance			
Triady Fauzi Sidiq	400m Freestyle	4:07.72	6	15	Did Not Advance			
Triady Fauzi Sidiq	200m Butterfly	2:05.28	4	11	Did Not Advance			
Indra Gunawan	50m Breaststroke	29.03	5	13	Did Not Advance			
Indra Gunawan	100m Breaststroke	1:04.70	5	16	Did Not Advance			
Indra Gunawan	200m Breaststroke	2:23.08	4	15	Did Not Advance			
I Gede Siman Sudartawa	50m Backstroke	26.72	4	10	Did Not Advance			
I Gede Siman Sudartawa	200m Backstroke	2:08.50	6	15	Did Not Advance			
Nicko Biondi Ricardo	50m Breaststroke	28.77	3	8			28.73	8
Nicko Biondi Ricardo	100m Breaststroke	1:04.33	5	11	Did Not Advance			
Men's Team; Glenn Victor Sutanto; Triady Fauzi Sidiq; Guntur Pratama Putera; I Gede Siman Sudartawa	4 × 100 m Freestyle Relay	3:40.06; 59.27; 53.21; 52.86; 54.72	5	12	Did Not Advance			
Men's Team; I Gede Siman Sudartawa; Nicko Biondi Ricardo; Glenn Victor Sutanto; Triady Fauzi Sidiq	4 × 100 m Medley Relay	DSQ; 58.90; 63.17; 53.86; DSQ	---	---	Did Not Advance			

== Taekwondo ==
Men

Athlete	Event	Round of 32	Round of 16	Quarterfinals	Semifinals	Final	
Athlete	Event	Opposition Score	Opposition Score	Opposition Score	Opposition Score	Opposition Score	Rank
Macho Virgonta Hungan	-68 kg	Samaha (LIB); W 8-7	Jang (KOR); L 10-4	Did not advance			
Julius Fernando	-74 kg	Bye	Jaswant (IND); W 6-5	Duong (VIE); L 5-6	Did not advance		
Basuki Nugroho	-80 kg	Bye	Luong (VIE); L 2-3	Did not advance			
Rizal Samsir	-87 kg		Bye	Yin (CHN); L 1-11	Did not advance		

Women

Athlete	Event	Round of 16	Quarterfinals	Semifinals	Final	
Athlete	Event	Opposition Score	Opposition Score	Opposition Score	Opposition Score	Rank
Fransisca Valentina	-46 kg	Bye	Johari (MAS); W 4-1	Haidar (JOR); L 1-2		3rd place, bronze medalist(s)
Ririn Agustina	-62 kg	Bye	Premwadew (THA); L 0-11	Did not advance		

== Tennis ==
Women

Athlete	Event	Round of 32	Round of 16	Quarterfinals	Semifinals	Final	
Athlete	Event	Opposition Score	Opposition Score	Opposition Score	Opposition Score	Opposition Score	Rank
Ayu Fani Damayanti	Singles	Tran (VIE); W 6-1 6-1	(8)Lee (KOR); L 4-6 4-6	Did not advance			
Lavinia Tananta	Singles	Ganbaatar (MGL); W 6-0 6-0	(3)Amanmuradova (UZB); L 2-6 2-6	Did not advance			
(6)Jessy Rompies; Yayuk Basuki	Doubles	Bye	Kim/Yu (KOR); W 6-2 6-1	(3)Chang/Hsieh (TPE); L 4-6 4-6	Did not advance		
(8)Ayu Fani Damayanti; Lavinia Tananta	Doubles	Bye	Kim/Lee (KOR); L 1-6 1-6	Did not advance			
Ayu Fani Damayanti; Lavinia Tananta; Jessy Rompies; Yayuk Basuki	Team		India (IND); W 3-0	Thailand (THA); L 0-3	Did not advance		

== Volleyball ==
=== Indoor ===
==== Men's Tournament ====
Team: Adam Adam, Antho Bertiyawan, Ahmad Grahari, Heryanto Heryanto, Ramzil Huda, Didi Irwadi, Veleg Krisnawan, Herlambang Maruf, Mahfud Nurcahyadi, Muhammad Riviansyah, Septiohadi Septiohadi, Wahyu Ardyanto.

Preliminary Round – Group C

Pos	Team	Pld	W	L	Pts	SPW	SPL	SPR	SW	SL	SR
1	Iran	4	4	0	8	306	214	1.430	12	0	MAX
2	Saudi Arabia	4	3	1	7	331	307	1.078	9	5	1.800
3	Indonesia	4	2	2	6	336	334	1.006	7	8	0.875
4	Turkmenistan	4	1	3	5	302	329	0.918	5	9	0.556
5	Mongolia	4	0	4	4	231	322	0.717	1	12	0.083

Source: Results

November 13, 2010; 18:00	Indonesia	3–2	Turkmenistan	Guangyao Gymnasium
November 13, 2010; 18:00	(20–25, 26–24, 26–28, 25–21, 15–12)			Guangyao Gymnasium

November 14, 2010; 16:00	Saudi Arabia	3–1	Indonesia	Guangyao Gymnasium
November 14, 2010; 16:00	(19–25, 25–19, 25–22, 25–22)			Guangyao Gymnasium

November 16, 2010; 18:00	Indonesia	0–3	Iran	Guangyao Gymnasium
November 16, 2010; 18:00	(15–25, 23–25, 23–25)			Guangyao Gymnasium

November 17, 2010; 18:00	Mongolia	0–3	Indonesia	Guangyao Gymnasium
November 17, 2010; 18:00	(22–25, 17–25, 16–25)			Guangyao Gymnasium

Placement for 9th -16th Place – Group G

Pos	Team	Pld	W	L	Pts	SPW	SPL	SPR	SW	SL	SR
1	Pakistan	3	3	0	6	289	273	1.059	9	4	2.250
2	Chinese Taipei	3	2	1	5	252	206	1.223	8	3	2.667
3	Indonesia	3	1	2	4	275	293	0.939	5	8	0.625
4	Turkmenistan	3	0	3	3	220	264	0.833	2	9	0.222

Source: Results

== Weightlifting ==
Men

Athlete	Event	Snatch		Clean & Jerk		Total	Rank
Athlete	Event	Result	Rank	Result	Rank	Total	Rank
Jadi Setiadi	-56 kg	120 kg	3	151 kg	2	271 kg	3rd place, bronze medalist(s)
Eko Yuli Irawan	-62 kg	141 kg	3	170 kg	2	311 kg	3rd place, bronze medalist(s)
Triyatno	-69 kg	143 kg	3	178 kg	2	321 kg	3rd place, bronze medalist(s)

Women

Athlete	Event	Snatch		Clean & Jerk		Total	Rank
Athlete	Event	Result	Rank	Result	Rank	Total	Rank
Citra Febrianti	-53 kg	89 kg	5	113 kg	4	202 kg	4
Okta Dwi Pramita	-58 kg	88 kg	10	118 kg	6	206 kg	7
Raema Lisa Rumbewas	-58 kg	94 kg	5	111 kg	10	205 kg	8
Sinta Darmariani	-69 kg	101 kg	4	137 kg	1	238 kg	2nd place, silver medalist(s)

== Wrestling ==
Men

Athlete	Event	Round of 32	Round of 16	Quarterfinals	Semifinals	Final	
Athlete	Event	Opposition Score	Opposition Score	Opposition Score	Opposition Score	Opposition Score	Rank
Ricky Fajar Adi Saputra	Freestyle 60 kg	Kamolov (UZB); L 0-3	Did not advance				
Fahriansyah	Freestyle 74 kg		Goudarzi (IRI); L 0-3	Repechage Rd 1 Dzhakypbekov (KGZ); L 0-3	Did not advance		
Ardiansyah	Greco-Roman 55 kg			Alsaedi (IRQ); L 0-3	Did not advance		
Muhammad Aliansyah	Greco-Roman 60 kg			Jung (KOR); L 0-3	Repechage Bronze; Singh (IND); L 1-3	Did not advance	

== Wushu ==
Men's Taolu

Athlete	Event	Qualification	Final	Total	Rank
Heryanto	Nanquan	9.14	9.60	18.74	9
David Hendrawan	Daoshu	9.60	9.59	19.19	9
Aldy Lukman	Daoshu	9.63	9.18	18.81	6

Men's Sanshou

Athlete	Event	Round of 16	Quarterfinals	Semifinals	Final	
Athlete	Event	Opposition Score	Opposition Score	Opposition Score	Opposition Score	Rank
Rahmat Junaidi Sukamto	-60 kg	Mohammad-Seifi (IRI); L 0-2	Did not advance			

Women's Taolu

Athlete	Event	Qualification	Final	Total	Rank
Susyana Tjhan	Changquan		9.66	9.66	Bronze medal
Ivana Irmanto	Nanquan	9.37	9.55	18.92	Silver medal
Lindswell	Taijiquan	9.67	9.43	19.10	6

Women's Sanshou

Athlete	Event	Round of 16	Quarterfinals	Semifinals	Final	
Athlete	Event	Opposition Score	Opposition Score	Opposition Score	Opposition Score	Rank
Moria Manalu	-60 kg	Al Huneyshi (YEM); W AV	Devi (IND); L 0-2	Did not advance		
