= Karate at the 2010 Asian Games – Men's kumite 75 kg =

Karate competition

Men's kumite 75 kg at the 2010 Asian Games
- Venue: Guangdong Gymnasium
- Date: 26 November 2010
- Competitors: 18 from 18 nations

Medalists
gold medal	Hamad Al-Nweam	Athletes from Kuwait
silver medal	Huang Hao-yun	Chinese Taipei
bronze medal	Lee Ka Wai	Hong Kong
bronze medal	Kim Do-won	South Korea

The men's kumite 75 kilograms competition at the 2010 Asian Games in Guangzhou, China was held on 26 November 2010 at the Guangdong Gymnasium.

== Schedule ==
All times are China Standard Time (UTC+08:00)

Date	Time	Event
Friday, 26 November 2010	09:30	1/16 finals
Friday, 26 November 2010	09:30	1/8 finals
Friday, 26 November 2010	09:30	Quarterfinals
Friday, 26 November 2010	09:30	Semifinals
Friday, 26 November 2010	09:30	Repechage 1
Friday, 26 November 2010	09:30	Repechage 2
Friday, 26 November 2010	09:30	Bronze medal match
Friday, 26 November 2010	09:30	Final

== Results ==
Legend

- H — Won by hansoku
- K — Won by kiken

=== Main bracket ===
==== Final ====
Final
Hamad Al-Nweam (IOC)	4
Huang Hao-yun (TPE)	2

==== Top half ====
1/16 finals
Saman Faiq (IRQ)	0
Hamad Al-Nweam (IOC)	4

1/8 finals
Binod Shakya (NEP)	0
Hamad Al-Nweam (IOC)	3
Yermek Ainazarov (KAZ)	5
Vikash Sharma (IND)	2
Ko Matsuhisa (JPN)	4
Mainuddin Hj Mohammad (BRU)	0^{H}
Lee Ka Wai (HKG)	4
Naowras Al-Hamwi (SYR)	0

Quarterfinals
Hamad Al-Nweam (IOC)	3
Yermek Ainazarov (KAZ)	0
Mainuddin Hj Mohammad (BRU)
Lee Ka Wai (HKG)	K

Semifinals
Hamad Al-Nweam (IOC)	4
Lee Ka Wai (HKG)	3

==== Bottom half ====
1/16 finals
Mohammed Abdulmajid (UAE)	10
Md Hossain Khan (BAN)	0

1/8 finals
Kim Do-won (KOR)	9
Mohammed Abdulmajid (UAE)	1
Leong Chin Iao (MAC)	0
Huang Hao-yun (TPE)	2
Bakhromdjon Safarkholov (TJK)	0
Nguyễn Minh Phụng (VIE)	4
Magid Adwan (QAT)	4
Ilgiz Kachkynbaev (KGZ)	1

Quarterfinals
Kim Do-won (KOR)	3
Huang Hao-yun (TPE)	6
Nguyễn Minh Phụng (VIE)	5
Magid Adwan (QAT)	1

Semifinals
Huang Hao-yun (TPE)	1
Nguyễn Minh Phụng (VIE)	0

=== Repechage ===
Repechage 1
Saman Faiq (IRQ)	5
Binod Shakya (NEP)	2

Repechage 2
Saman Faiq (IRQ)	2
Yermek Ainazarov (KAZ)	1
Leong Chin Iao (MAC)	3
Kim Do-won (KOR)	7

Bronze medal match
Saman Faiq (IRQ)	2
Lee Ka Wai (HKG)	7
Kim Do-won (KOR)	4
Nguyễn Minh Phụng (VIE)	3
