= Cue sports at the 2010 Asian Games – Men's three-cushion singles =

Men's three-cushion singles at the 2010 Asian Games
- Venue: Asian Games Town Gymnasium
- Dates: 15–17 November 2010
- Competitors: 16 from 9 nations

Medalists
gold medal	Tsuyoshi Suzuki	Japan
silver medal	Joji Kai	Japan
bronze medal	Lý Thế Vinh	Vietnam
bronze medal	Dương Anh Vũ	Vietnam

The men's three-cushion billiards singles tournament at the 2010 Asian Games in Guangzhou took place from 15 November to 17 November at Asian Games Town Gymnasium.

Tsuyoshi Suzuki of Japan won the gold medal after beating his teammate Joji Kai in the final.

== Schedule ==
All times are China Standard Time (UTC+08:00)

Date	Time	Event
Monday, 15 November 2010	10:00	Last 16
Tuesday, 16 November 2010	10:00	Quarterfinals
Tuesday, 16 November 2010	19:30	Semifinals
Wednesday, 17 November 2010	13:00	Final

== Results ==
Legend

- WO — Won by walkover

Last 16
1	Tsuyoshi Suzuki (JPN)	40
Batbayaryn Dorjsüren (MGL)	11
Abdullah Al-Mihzam (KSA)	6
Thawat Sujaritthurakarn (THA)	18
Lý Thế Vinh (VIE)	40
Rodolfo Luat (PHI)	29
Vijay Goel (IND)	5
4	Heo Jung-han (KOR)	40
3	Kim Kyung-roul (KOR)	39
Joji Kai (JPN)	40
Fahad Al-Barrak (KSA)	16
Dharminder Lilly (IND)	40
Thongchai Punyawee (THA)	8
Reynaldo Grandea (PHI)	40
Bashar Hussein (QAT)
2	Dương Anh Vũ (VIE)	WO

Quarterfinals
1	Tsuyoshi Suzuki (JPN)	40
Thawat Sujaritthurakarn (THA)	10
Lý Thế Vinh (VIE)	40
4	Heo Jung-han (KOR)	35
Joji Kai (JPN)	40
Dharminder Lilly (IND)	8
Reynaldo Grandea (PHI)	18
2	Dương Anh Vũ (VIE)	40

Semifinals
1	Tsuyoshi Suzuki (JPN)	40
Lý Thế Vinh (VIE)	36
Joji Kai (JPN)	40
2	Dương Anh Vũ (VIE)	29

Final
1	Tsuyoshi Suzuki (JPN)	40
Joji Kai (JPN)	37
