= Afghanistan at the 2010 Asian Games =

- IOC code: AFG
- NOC: Afghanistan National Olympic Committee

in Guangzhou
- Competitors: 66 in 13 sports
- Officials: 24
- Medals Ranked 29th: Gold Silver 2 Bronze 1 Total 3

Asian Games appearances (overview)
- 1951; 1954; 1958; 1962; 1966; 1970; 1974; 1978; 1982; 1986; 1990; 1994; 1998; 2002; 2006; 2010; 2014; 2018; 2022; 2026

Afghanistan participated at the 2010 16th Asian Games in Guangzhou, China, sending 66 competitors in 13 sports. It won 2 silver and 1 bronze medal.

== Medalist ==
Medal	Name	Sport	Event	Date
Silver	Nesar Ahmad Bahave	Taekwondo	Men's Under 80kg	18 November
Silver	Afghanistan national Cricket Team	Cricket	Team	26 November
Bronze	Jawad Lakzayee	Taekwondo	Men's Under 60kg	19 November

== Athletics ==
=== Men ===
Track and road events

Event	Athletes	Heats		Semifinal		Final	
Event	Athletes	Time	Rank	Time	Rank	Time	Rank
	Waleed Anwari	11.32 PB	6th	did not advance			
	Mohammad Yaqoot					2:51:33	18th

== Basketball ==
=== Men ===
Team

- Mohammad Amiri
- Sayed Ansari
- Haroun Arafi
- Yousof Etemadi
- Qais Haider
- Habib Kabir
- Abdullah Karimi
- Nafi Mashriqi
- Mohammad Mojaddidi
- Ali Noorzad
- Mohammad Soratgar
- Masseh Tahiry

Qualifying round

Group D

Team	Pld	W	L	PF	PA	PD	Pts
India	1	1	0	83	76	+7	2
Afghanistan	1	0	1	76	83	−7	1

November 15
19:15

Afghanistan	76–83	India
Scoring by quarter: 16–14, 22–16, 15–23, 23–30
Pts: Mojaddidi 25; Rebs: Mashriqi 12; Asts: Etemadi, Mojaddidi 5		Pts: J. Singh 22; Rebs: J. Singh 8 Asts: Rai 5

Guangti Gymnasium, Guangzhou
Referees: Cristiano Maranho (BRA), Ferdinand Pascual (PHI), Fong Kin Lung (HKG)

== Boxing ==
=== Men ===
Athlete	Event	Round of 32	Round of 16	Quarterfinals	Semifinals	Final
Athlete	Event	Opposition Result	Opposition Result	Opposition Result	Opposition Result	Opposition Result
Mohammad Nazari	Light Flyweight	BYE	Jonghun Shin (KOR); L PTS 3-13	did not advance		
Mohammad Islam	Light Welterweight	BYE	Daniyar Yeleussinov (KAZ); L RSCI R1 1:26	did not advance		
Najibllah Azimi	Welterweight	BYE	Otgonjargal Jargal (MGL); L PTS 1-6	did not advance		

== Cricket ==
=== Men ===
Team

Gulbudeen Naib
Mohammad Shahzad
Mohammad Sami Agha
Mohammad Nabi
Karim Sadiq
Shafiqullah Shafaq
Mirwais Ashraf
Shabir Noori
Shapoor Zadran
Asghar Afghan
Samiullah Shinwari
Nawroz Mangal
Hamid Hassan
Aftab Alam

Quarterfinals

November 24
9:30
Scorecard

Afghanistan; 66/2 (13.2 overs)	v	Hong Kong; 63 all out (17.4 overs)
Nawroz Mangal 20* (14); Nadeem Ahmed 1/13 (4 overs)		Nadeem Ahmed 17 (29); Mirwais Ashraf 3/8 (4 overs)

Afghanistan won by 8 wickets
Guanggong Cricket Stadium, Guangzhou
Umpires: Buddhi Pradhan (NEP) and Viswanathan Kalidas (MAS)

- Hong Kong won the toss and elected to bat.

Semifinals

November 25
9:30
scorecard

Pakistan; 103/7 (20 overs)	v	Afghanistan; 125/8 (20 overs)
Khalid Latif 26 (32); Hamid Hassan 2/16 (4 overs)		Shabir Noori 35 (30); Raza Hasan 2/19 (4 overs)

Afghanistan won by 22 runs
Guanggong Cricket Stadium, Guangzhou
Umpires: Sarika Prasad (SIN) and Narayanan Sivan (MAS)

- Pakistan won the toss and elected to field.

Final

November 26
13:30
scorecard

Afghanistan; 118/8 (20 overs)	v	Bangladesh; 119/5 (19.3 overs)
Asghar Afghan 38* (36); Mohammad Ashraful 2/3 (1 over)		Naeem Islam 34* (42); Karim Sadiq 2/27 (3 overs)

Bangladesh won by 5 wickets
Guanggong Cricket Stadium, Guangzhou
Umpires: Sarika Prasad (SIN) and Buddhi Pradhan (NEP)

- Afghanistan won the toss and elected to bat.

2010 Asian Games Silver Medal

Afghanistan

== Cue Sports ==
=== Men ===
Event	Athlete	First round	Round of 32	Round of 16	Quarterfinals	Semifinals	Final
Event	Athlete	Opposition Result	Opposition Result	Opposition Result	Opposition Result	Opposition Result	Opposition Result
8-ball Pool Singles	Nader Sultani	BYE	Chen Man Lee (HKG); W 7-6	Omar Al-Shaheen (KUW); L 3-7	did not advance		
8-ball Pool Singles	Bahauddin Faqiri	Alok Kumar (IND); L 1-7	did not advance				
9-ball Pool Singles	Nader Sultani	Shiwaz Ahmed (MDV); W 9-5	Khaled Almutairi (KUW); W 9-6	Phuc Long Nguyen (VIE); L 4-9	did not advance		
9-ball Pool Singles	Bahauddin Faqiri	BYE	Abdullah Alyousef (KUW); L 5-9	did not advance			
Snooker Singles	Salih Khan Mohammad	BYE	Benjamin Guevarra (PHI); W 4-3	Karam Fatima (SYR); W 4-1	Dechawat Poomjaeng (THA); L 1-4	did not advance	
Snooker Singles	Mohammad Sen Zahi	Kubanychbek Sagyndykov (KGZ); W 4-0	Muhammad Sajjad (PAK); L 1-4	did not advance			
Snooker Team	Salih Khan Mohammad; Mohammad Sen Zahi; Nader Sultani			Saudi Arabia (KSA); W 3-0 (99–1, 56–52, 52-38)	India (IND); L 2-3 (57–46, 16-68, 0-62, 82-36, 0-80)	did not advance	

== Golf ==
=== Men ===
Event	Athletes	1st Round	2nd Round	3rd Round	4th Round	Total	Rank
Men's Individual	Hashmatullah Sarwaree	+36 (108)	+26 (98)	+29 (101)	+25 (97)	+116 (404)	73rd
Men's Individual	Ali Ahmad Fazel	+58 (130)	+40 (112)	+41 (113)	+40 (112)	+179 (467)	75th

== Judo ==
=== Men ===
Athlete	Event	1st Round	Round of 32	Round of 16	Quarterfinals	Semifinals	Final
Athlete	Event	Opposition Result	Opposition Result	Opposition Result	Opposition Result	Opposition Result	Opposition Result
Rahmat Mushkel	Men's −66 kg	Shukhratjoni Farkhizoda (TJK); L 000 - 121	did not advance				

=== Women ===
Athlete	Event	1st Round	Round of 32	Round of 16	Quarterfinals	Semifinals	Final
Athlete	Event	Opposition Result	Opposition Result	Opposition Result	Opposition Result	Opposition Result	Opposition Result
Fahima Rezayee	Women's −57 kg	BYE	Jan di Kim (KOR); L 000 S1 - 100	did not advance			

== Karate ==
=== Men ===
Athlete	Event	Round of 32	Round of 16	Quarterfinals	Semifinals	Final
Athlete	Event	Opposition Result	Opposition Result	Opposition Result	Opposition Result	Opposition Result
Fazel Ahmad Ahmadi	Men's −55 kg		BYE	Mohammad Ghasemi (IRI); L PTS 0-3	did not advance	
Sayed Amiri	Men's −60 kg	Abduqahhor Qahorov (TJK); W PTS 1-0	Abdullah Galloul (QAT); W PTS 4-2	Wen-Huang Hsia (TPE); W HAS 6-1	Darkhan Assadilov (KAZ); L KIK 0-0	Bronze Medal match Minh Duc Tran (VIE); L KIK 0-0
Rahmatullah Hassani	Men's −67 kg	Haojie Li (CHN); L PTS 0-4	did not advance			
Hussin Ali Rezayee	Men's −84 kg	Tzu Yao Yen (TPE); L PTS 0-4	did not advance			

=== Women ===
Athlete	Event	Round of 16	Quarterfinals	Semifinals	Final
Athlete	Event	Opposition Result	Opposition Result	Opposition Result	Opposition Result
Nahid Behrooz	Women's −61 kg	Ka Man Chan (HKG); L PTS 0-5	did not advance		

== Shooting ==
=== Men ===
Event	Athlete	Qualification		Final	
Event	Athlete	Score	Rank	Score	Rank
Men's 10 m air pistol	Sayed Jawid Athar	506- 4x	50th	did not advance	

== Taekwondo ==
=== Men ===
Athlete	Event	Round of 32	Round of 16	Quarterfinals	Semifinals	Final
Athlete	Event	Opposition Result	Opposition Result	Opposition Result	Opposition Result	Opposition Result
Mohammad Fiaz	Flyweight (-58kg)	BYE	Hazza Al Kalbani (UAE); W SUP 4-3	Pen-Ek Karaket (THA); L PTS 2-13	did not advance	
Mohammad Lakzaee	Bantamweight (-63kg)	BYE	Darkhan Kassymkulov (KAZ); W PTS 10-5	Kannan Ibrahim Kannan (JOR); W PTS 7-6	Nacha Punthong (THA); L PTS 3-7 (bronze)	did not advance
Rohullah Nikpai	Featherweight (-68kg)	Maksim Rafalovich (UZB); W PTS 3-1	Tsung Jui Lo (TPE); L PTS 0-1	did not advance		
Abas Hussaini	Lightweight (-74kg)	Shakhriyor Karimov (TJK); L PTS 1-4	did not advance			
Nesar Ahmad Bahawi	Welterweight (-80kg)	BYE	Yadav Paudel (NEP); W PTS 15-3	Marlon Avenido (PHI); W PTS 12-11	Farzad Abdollahi (IRI); W PTS 9-5	Nabil Hassan (JOR); L PTS 3-4 (silver)

=== Women ===
Athlete	Event	Round of 32	Round of 16	Quarterfinals	Semifinals	Final
Athlete	Event	Opposition Result	Opposition Result	Opposition Result	Opposition Result	Opposition Result
Laila Hussaini	Finweight (-46kg)	BYE	Pauline Lopez (PHI); L PTS 0-1	did not advance		
Humaira Mohammadi	Bantamweight (-53kg)	Jie Lei (CHN); L PTS 3-17	did not advance			

== Weightlifting ==
Athlete	Event	Snatch			Clean & Jerk			Total	Rank
Athlete	Event	Attempt 1	Attempt 2	Attempt 3	Attempt 1	Attempt 2	Attempt 3	Total	Rank
Mohammad Mustafa Karmand	Men's 85 kg	95	105	~~110~~	120	130	~~135~~	235	12th

== Wrestling ==
=== Men ===
Freestyle

Athlete	Event	Round of 32	Round of 16	Quarterfinals	Semifinals	Final
Athlete	Event	Opposition Result	Opposition Result	Opposition Result	Opposition Result	Opposition Result
Abdul Karim Wahedi	60 kg	BYE	Ghazwan Lazkani Munla Badawi (SYR); W PP 3-1	Feng Gao (CHN); L PO 0-3	did not advance	
Toryalai Sadeqi	84 kg	BYE	Yermek Baiduashov (KAZ); L PO 0-3	did not advance		
Sayed Khalid Hashemi	96 kg	BYE	Jaegang Kim (KOR); L PO 0-3	did not advance		

Greco-Roman

Athlete	Event	Round of 16	Quarterfinals	Semifinals	Final
Athlete	Event	Opposition Result	Opposition Result	Opposition Result	Opposition Result
Noor Ahmad Ahmadi	84 kg	BYE	Alkhazur Ozdiyev (KAZ); L PO 0-3	did not advance	

== Wushu ==
=== Men ===
Daoshu\Gunshu

Athlete	Event	Daoshu		Gunshu		Total	
Athlete	Event	Result	Rank	Result	Rank	Result	Rank
Mohammad Jawad Sahka	Daoshu\Gunshu All-Round	6.72	10th	DNS		6.72	11th

Nanquan\Nangun

Athlete	Event	Nanquan		Nangun		Total	
Athlete	Event	Result	Rank	Result	Rank	Result	Rank
Taza Gul Logari	Nanquan\Nangun All-Round	DNS		DNS			

Taijiquan\Taijijian

Athlete	Event	Taijijian		Taijiquan		Total	
Athlete	Event	Result	Rank	Result	Rank	Result	Rank
Khawja Khatibzada	Taijiquan\Taijijian All-Round	DNS		7.11	19th	7.11	19th

Sanshou

Athlete	Event	Round of 16	Quarterfinals	Semifinals	Final
Athlete	Event	Opposition Result	Opposition Result	Opposition Result	Opposition Result
Mohammad Khalid Hotak	56 kg	Santosh Kumar (IND); W PTS 2-0	Van Hau Phan (VIE); L PTS 0-2	did not advance	
Amirshah Amiri	60 kg	Mangal Prasad Taharu (NEP); L PTS 0-2	did not advance		
Mohammad Saleem Zarifi	70 kg	Liangchan Cai (MAC); L PTS 0-2	did not advance		
Khairullah Takhari	75 kg	BYE	Chunpeng Jiang (CHN); L AV 0-1	did not advance	

=== Women ===
Sanshou

Athlete	Event	Round of 16	Quarterfinals	Semifinals	Final
Athlete	Event	Opposition Result	Opposition Result	Opposition Result	Opposition Result
Zahra Oriya	52 kg	Elaheh Mansoryansamiroumi (IRI); L KO 0-0	did not advance		
Suraya Salahshour	60 kg	BYE	Tzu Yi Wu (TPE); L 0-2	did not advance	
