= Sepak takraw at the 2010 Asian Games – Men's doubles =

Men's doubles at the 2010 Asian Games
- Venue: Haizhu Sports Center
- Date: 25–27 November 2010
- Competitors: 21 from 7 nations

Medalists
gold medal	Myanmar
silver medal	South Korea
bronze medal	Japan
bronze medal	Indonesia

The men's double regu sepak takraw competition at the 2010 Asian Games in Guangzhou was held from 25 November to 27 November at the Haizhu Sports Center.

== Squads ==
China	India	Indonesia	Japan
Xu Mingchi; Yang Jiapeng; Zhou Haiyang	Niken Singh Khangembam; Gopen Singh Taiyenjam; Ingoba Singh Thongam	Husni Uba; Jusri Pakke; Yudi Purnomo	Yuichi Matsuda; Susumu Teramoto; Takeshi Terashima
Myanmar	Philippines	South Korea	
Si Thu Lin; Zaw Latt; Zaw Zaw Aung	Jason Huerte; Marbie Quirante; Metodio Suico	Jeong Won-deok; Lee Gyu-nam; Lee Jun-ho	

== Results ==
All times are China Standard Time (UTC+08:00)

=== Preliminary ===
==== Group A ====
Pos	Team	Pld	W	L	SF	SA	SD	Pts	Qualification
1	Myanmar	2	2	0	4	0	+4	4	Semifinals
2	South Korea	2	1	1	2	2	0	2	Semifinals
3	Philippines	2	0	2	0	4	−4	0	

Source: Results

Date	Time		Score		Set 1	Set 2	Set 3
25 Nov	09:00	Philippines	0–2	South Korea	14–21	17–21	
25 Nov	19:30	Myanmar	2–0	South Korea	21–15	21–15	
26 Nov	09:00	Myanmar	2–0	Philippines	21–12	21–11	

==== Group B ====
Pos	Team	Pld	W	L	SF	SA	SD	Pts	Qualification
1	Indonesia	3	3	0	6	0	+6	6	Semifinals
2	Japan	3	2	1	4	3	+1	4	Semifinals
3	China	3	1	2	2	5	−3	2	
4	India	3	0	3	2	6	−4	0	

Source: Results

Date	Time		Score		Set 1	Set 2	Set 3
25 Nov	09:00	Indonesia	2–0	China	21–17	21–13	
25 Nov	10:00	Japan	2–1	India	21–17	20–22	15–13
25 Nov	19:30	Indonesia	2–0	India	21–12	21–16	
25 Nov	19:30	China	0–2	Japan	22–24	14–21	
26 Nov	10:00	Indonesia	2–0	Japan	21–18	21–18	
26 Nov	10:00	India	1–2	China	21–17	24–25	10–15

=== Knockout round ===
Semifinals
26 November
Myanmar	2
Japan	0
26 November
Indonesia	0
South Korea	2

Final
27 November
Myanmar	2
South Korea	0

==== Semifinals ====
Date	Time		Score		Set 1	Set 2	Set 3
26 Nov	15:30	Myanmar	2–0	Japan	21–10	21–15	
26 Nov	15:30	Indonesia	0–2	South Korea	19–21	20–22	

==== Final ====
Date	Time		Score		Set 1	Set 2	Set 3
27 Nov	09:00	Myanmar	2–0	South Korea	21–18	21–18	
