= Karate at the 2010 Asian Games =

- Venue: Guangdong Gymnasium
- Dates: 24–26 November 2010
- Competitors: 183 from 34 nations

Karate at the 2010 Asian Games was held in Guangzhou, China between 24 and 26 November 2010. All competition took place at the Guangdong Gymnasium.

== Schedule ==
P	Preliminary rounds & Repechage	F	Finals

Event↓/Date →	24th Wed		25th Thu		26th Fri	
Men's kata	P	F				
Men's kumite 55 kg	P	F				
Men's kumite 60 kg			P	F		
Men's kumite 67 kg			P	F		
Men's kumite 75 kg					P	F
Men's kumite 84 kg					P	F
Men's kumite +84 kg	P	F				
Women's kata	P	F				
Women's kumite 50 kg	P	F				
Women's kumite 55 kg			P	F		
Women's kumite 61 kg					P	F
Women's kumite 68 kg					P	F
Women's kumite +68 kg			P	F		

== Medalists ==
=== Men ===
Event	Gold	Silver	Bronze
Kata	Ku Jin Keat; Malaysia	Itaru Oki; Japan	Yousef Al-Harbi; Athletes from Kuwait
Kata	Ku Jin Keat; Malaysia	Itaru Oki; Japan	Faisal Zainuddin; Indonesia
Kumite −55 kg	Puvaneswaran Ramasamy; Malaysia	Imad Al-Malki; Saudi Arabia	Hirannithishatphol Saratham; Thailand
Kumite −55 kg	Puvaneswaran Ramasamy; Malaysia	Imad Al-Malki; Saudi Arabia	Hsieh Cheng-kang; Chinese Taipei
Kumite −60 kg	Darkhan Assadilov; Kazakhstan	Bashar Al-Najjar; Jordan	Trần Minh Đức; Vietnam
Kumite −60 kg	Darkhan Assadilov; Kazakhstan	Bashar Al-Najjar; Jordan	Donny Dharmawan; Indonesia
Kumite −67 kg	Rinat Sagandykov; Kazakhstan	Abdullah Al-Otaibi; Athletes from Kuwait	Fahad Al-Khathami; Saudi Arabia
Kumite −67 kg	Rinat Sagandykov; Kazakhstan	Abdullah Al-Otaibi; Athletes from Kuwait	Lee Ji-hwan; South Korea
Kumite −75 kg	Hamad Al-Nweam; Athletes from Kuwait	Huang Hao-yun; Chinese Taipei	Lee Ka Wai; Hong Kong
Kumite −75 kg	Hamad Al-Nweam; Athletes from Kuwait	Huang Hao-yun; Chinese Taipei	Kim Do-won; South Korea
Kumite −84 kg	Jasem Vishkaei; Iran	Ryutaro Araga; Japan	Yen Tzu-yao; Chinese Taipei
Kumite −84 kg	Jasem Vishkaei; Iran	Ryutaro Araga; Japan	Mutasembellah Khair; Jordan
Kumite +84 kg	Zabihollah Pourshab; Iran	Umar Syarief; Indonesia	Lei Kuong Cheong; Macau
Kumite +84 kg	Zabihollah Pourshab; Iran	Umar Syarief; Indonesia	Khalid Khalidov; Kazakhstan

=== Women ===
Event	Gold	Silver	Bronze
Kata	Rika Usami; Japan	Huang Yu-chi; Chinese Taipei	Cheung Pui Si; Macau
Kata	Rika Usami; Japan	Huang Yu-chi; Chinese Taipei	Lim Lee Lee; Malaysia
Kumite −50 kg	Li Hong; China	Vũ Thị Nguyệt Ánh; Vietnam	Chen Yen-hui; Chinese Taipei
Kumite −50 kg	Li Hong; China	Vũ Thị Nguyệt Ánh; Vietnam	Yanisa Torrattanawathana; Thailand
Kumite −55 kg	Lê Bích Phương; Vietnam	Miki Kobayashi; Japan	Fatemeh Chalaki; Iran
Kumite −55 kg	Lê Bích Phương; Vietnam	Miki Kobayashi; Japan	Ahn Tae-eun; South Korea
Kumite −61 kg	Yu Miyamoto; Japan	Yamini Gopalasamy; Malaysia	Chan Ka Man; Hong Kong
Kumite −61 kg	Yu Miyamoto; Japan	Yamini Gopalasamy; Malaysia	Barno Mirzaeva; Uzbekistan
Kumite −68 kg	Feng Lanlan; China	Emiko Honma; Japan	Samira Malekipour; Iran
Kumite −68 kg	Feng Lanlan; China	Emiko Honma; Japan	Liu Ya-li; Chinese Taipei
Kumite +68 kg	Manar Shath; Jordan	Jamaliah Jamaludin; Malaysia	Paula Carion; Macau
Kumite +68 kg	Manar Shath; Jordan	Jamaliah Jamaludin; Malaysia	Tang Lingling; China

== Medal table ==
Rank	Nation	Gold	Silver	Bronze	Total
1	Japan (JPN)	2	4	0	6
2	Malaysia (MAS)	2	2	1	5
3	Iran (IRI)	2	0	2	4
4	China (CHN)	2	0	1	3
4	Kazakhstan (KAZ)	2	0	1	3
6	Athletes from Kuwait (IOC)	1	1	1	3
6	Jordan (JOR)	1	1	1	3
6	Vietnam (VIE)	1	1	1	3
9	Chinese Taipei (TPE)	0	2	4	6
10	Indonesia (INA)	0	1	2	3
11	Saudi Arabia (KSA)	0	1	1	2
12	Macau (MAC)	0	0	3	3
12	South Korea (KOR)	0	0	3	3
14	Hong Kong (HKG)	0	0	2	2
14	Thailand (THA)	0	0	2	2
16	Uzbekistan (UZB)	0	0	1	1
Totals (16 entries)		13	13	26	52

== Participating nations ==
A total of 183 athletes from 34 nations competed in karate at the 2010 Asian Games:

- Afghanistan (5)
- Athletes from Kuwait (4)
- Bangladesh (5)
- Brunei (4)
- China (8)
- Chinese Taipei (8)
- Hong Kong (6)
- India (8)
- Indonesia (8)
- Iran (8)
- Iraq (3)
- Japan (8)
- Jordan (6)
- Kazakhstan (8)
- Kyrgyzstan (8)
- Laos (5)
- Macau (8)
- Malaysia (8)
- Nepal (8)
- North Korea (2)
- Pakistan (1)
- Palestine (3)
- Philippines (4)
- Qatar (4)
- Saudi Arabia (4)
- South Korea (8)
- Sri Lanka (1)
- Syria (4)
- Tajikistan (3)
- Thailand (3)
- Timor-Leste (2)
- United Arab Emirates (3)
- Uzbekistan (8)
- Vietnam (7)
