= Wushu at the 2010 Asian Games – Men's sanshou 65 kg =

Men's sanshou 65 kg at the 2010 Asian Games
- Venue: Nansha Gymnasium
- Dates: 14 November 2010
- Competitors: 13 from 13 nations

Medalists
gold medal	Zhang Junyong	China
silver medal	Nguyễn Văn Tuấn	Vietnam
bronze medal	Mark Eddiva	Philippines
bronze medal	Hyun Chang-ho	South Korea

The men's sanshou 65 kilograms competition at the 2010 Asian Games in Guangzhou, China was held from 14 November to 17 November at the Nansha Gymnasium.

A total of thirteen competitors from thirteen countries competed in this event, limited to fighters whose body weight was less than 65 kilograms.

Zhang Junyong from China won the gold medal after beating Nguyễn Văn Tuấn of Vietnam in gold medal bout 2–0, Zhang won both periods in the final. The bronze medal was shared by Mark Eddiva from the Philippines and Hyun Chang-ho of South Korea. Athletes from Iran (Javad Aghaei), Pakistan (Maaz Khan), Macau (Cai Jun Long) and Turkmenistan (Kurbangeldi Atageldiýew) shared the fifth place.

Five more athletes from Sri Lanka, Thailand, Kyrgyzstan, Nepal and Kazakhstan lost in the first round without winning a single round and did not advance further.

== Schedule ==
All times are China Standard Time (UTC+08:00)

Date	Time	Event
Sunday, 14 November 2010	19:30	Round of 16
Monday, 15 November 2010	19:30	Quarterfinals
Tuesday, 16 November 2010	19:30	Semifinals
Wednesday, 17 November 2010	19:30	Final

== Results ==
Legend

- AV — Absolute victory

Round of 16
Ishan Abeyrathna (SRI)
Javad Aghaei (IRI)	AV
Narong Thongchai (THA)	0
Zhang Junyong (CHN)	2
Kurbangeldi Atageldiýew (TKM)	2
Ulan Eraliev (KGZ)	0
Purushottam Rijal (NEP)	0
Hyun Chang-ho (KOR)	2
Nguyễn Văn Tuấn (VIE)	2
Ramis Kurtidi (KAZ)	0

Quarterfinals
Mark Eddiva (PHI)	AV
Javad Aghaei (IRI)
Zhang Junyong (CHN)	2
Kurbangeldi Atageldiýew (TKM)	0
Maaz Khan (PAK)	0
Hyun Chang-ho (KOR)	2
Nguyễn Văn Tuấn (VIE)	2
Cai Jun Long (MAC)	0

Semifinals
Mark Eddiva (PHI)	0
Zhang Junyong (CHN)	2
Hyun Chang-ho (KOR)	0
Nguyễn Văn Tuấn (VIE)	2

Final
Zhang Junyong (CHN)	2
Nguyễn Văn Tuấn (VIE)	0
