= Sepak takraw at the 2010 Asian Games – Women's team regu =

Sports competition in Mainland China

Women's team regu at the 2010 Asian Games
- Venue: Haizhu Sports Center
- Date: 16–20 November 2010
- Competitors: 79 from 7 nations

Medalists
| gold medal | Thailand |
| silver medal | China |
| bronze medal | Indonesia |
| bronze medal | Vietnam |

The women's team regu sepak takraw competition at the 2010 Asian Games in Guangzhou was held from 16 November to 20 November at the Haizhu Sports Center.

== Squads ==
| China | India | Indonesia | Japan |
|---|---|---|---|
| Cui Yonghui; Gu Xihui; Lao Tianxue; Liu Xiaofang; Liu Yanhong; Song Cheng; Sun Xiaodan; Wang Xiaohua; Zhang Yanan; Zhao Tengfei; Zhou Ronghong | Rebika Akoijam; Maipak Devi Ayekpam; Deepa; Binalata Devi Elangbam; Rasheshwari Devi Elangbam; Ronita Devi Elangbam; Robita Devi Khangembam; Aruna Devi Mutum; Jimi Devi Okram; Amrita Pande; Sameena Begum; Milana Devi Waikhom | Aliya Prihatini; Asmira; Dini Mita Sari; Florensia Cristy; Hasmawati Umar; Jumasiah; Lena; Leni; Mega Citra Kusuma; Nur Qadriyanti; Rike Media Sari | Sawa Aoki; Satomi Ishihara; Yumi Ishino; Aika Kameoka; Azusa Kawai; Azusa Masuko; Yukie Sato; Yuka Watanabe; Chiharu Yano |
| South Korea | Thailand | Vietnam | |
| Ahn Soon-ok; Bae Han-oul; Jeong In-seon; Kim Dong-hee; Kim Hee-jin; Kim Mi-jin; Park Keum-duk; Park Mi-ri; Sim Su-yeon; Song Mi-jeong; Um Mi-sun; Yu Yeong-sim | Tidawan Daosakul; Masaya Duangsri; Wanwisa Jankaen; Nitinadda Kaewkamsai; Kaewjai Pumsawangkaew; Sunthari Rupsung; Phikun Seedam; Payom Srihongsa; Nareerat Takan; Rungtip Tanaking; Nisa Thanaattawut; Daranee Wongcharern | Đinh Thị Thúy Hằng; Lại Thị Huyền Trang; Lê Thị Hạnh; Lưu Thị Thanh; Nguyễn Bạch Vân; Nguyễn Hải Thảo; Nguyễn Thị Bích Thủy; Nguyễn Thị Dung; Nguyễn Thị Hạnh Ngân; Nguyễn Thị Thuý An; Nguyễn Thịnh Thu Ba; Trương Thị Vân | |

== Results ==
All times are China Standard Time (UTC+08:00)

=== Preliminary ===
==== Group A ====
| Pos | Team | Pld | W | L | MF | MA | MD | Pts | Qualification |
|---|---|---|---|---|---|---|---|---|---|
| 1 | Indonesia | 2 | 2 | 0 | 5 | 1 | +4 | 4 | Semifinals |
| 2 | Vietnam | 2 | 1 | 1 | 4 | 2 | +2 | 2 | Semifinals |
| 3 | Japan | 2 | 0 | 2 | 0 | 6 | −6 | 0 | |

Source: Results

| Date | Time | | Score | | Regu 1 | | | Regu 2 | | | Regu 3 | | |
| Date | Time | | Score | | Set 1 | Set 2 | Set 3 | Set 1 | Set 2 | Set 3 | Set 1 | Set 2 | Set 3 |
|---|---|---|---|---|---|---|---|---|---|---|---|---|---|
| 16 Nov | 08:30 | Indonesia | 3–0 | Japan | 2–0 | | | 2–0 | | | 2–0 | | |
| 16 Nov | 08:30 | Indonesia | 3–0 | Japan | 21–19 | 21–14 | | 21–8 | 21–16 | | 21–14 | 21–14 | |
| 16 Nov | 19:00 | Vietnam | 3–0 | Japan | 2–0 | | | 2–0 | | | 2–0 | | |
| 16 Nov | 19:00 | Vietnam | 3–0 | Japan | 21–6 | 21–12 | | 24–22 | 21–19 | | 21–7 | 21–7 | |
| 18 Nov | 08:30 | Vietnam | 1–2 | Indonesia | 2–0 | | | 1–2 | | | 0–2 | | |
| 18 Nov | 08:30 | Vietnam | 1–2 | Indonesia | 21–14 | 21–12 | | 21–15 | 17–21 | 13–15 | 19–21 | 20–22 | |

==== Group B ====
| Pos | Team | Pld | W | L | MF | MA | MD | Pts | Qualification |
|---|---|---|---|---|---|---|---|---|---|
| 1 | Thailand | 3 | 3 | 0 | 9 | 0 | +9 | 6 | Semifinals |
| 2 | China | 3 | 2 | 1 | 6 | 3 | +3 | 4 | Semifinals |
| 3 | South Korea | 3 | 1 | 2 | 3 | 6 | −3 | 2 | |
| 4 | India | 3 | 0 | 3 | 0 | 9 | −9 | 0 | |

Source: Results

| Date | Time | | Score | | Regu 1 | | | Regu 2 | | | Regu 3 | | |
| Date | Time | | Score | | Set 1 | Set 2 | Set 3 | Set 1 | Set 2 | Set 3 | Set 1 | Set 2 | Set 3 |
|---|---|---|---|---|---|---|---|---|---|---|---|---|---|
| 16 Nov | 14:00 | Thailand | 3–0 | China | 2–0 | | | 2–0 | | | 2–0 | | |
| 16 Nov | 14:00 | Thailand | 3–0 | China | 21–9 | 21–10 | | 21–13 | 21–13 | | 21–14 | 22–20 | |
| 16 Nov | 14:00 | India | 0–3 | South Korea | 0–2 | | | 0–2 | | | 0–2 | | |
| 16 Nov | 14:00 | India | 0–3 | South Korea | 13–21 | 13–21 | | 8–21 | 12–21 | | 14–21 | 11–21 | |
| 17 Nov | 08:30 | China | 3–0 | India | 2–0 | | | 2–0 | | | 2–0 | | |
| 17 Nov | 08:30 | China | 3–0 | India | 21–13 | 21–7 | | 21–7 | 21–8 | | 21–13 | 21–13 | |
| 17 Nov | 14:00 | Thailand | 3–0 | South Korea | 2–0 | | | 2–0 | | | 2–0 | | |
| 17 Nov | 14:00 | Thailand | 3–0 | South Korea | 21–9 | 21–13 | | 21–11 | 21–14 | | 21–15 | 21–12 | |
| 18 Nov | 14:00 | Thailand | 3–0 | India | 2–0 | | | 2–0 | | | 2–0 | | |
| 18 Nov | 14:00 | Thailand | 3–0 | India | 21–9 | 21–4 | | 21–8 | 21–5 | | 21–4 | 21–11 | |
| 18 Nov | 14:00 | South Korea | 0–3 | China | 0–2 | | | 0–2 | | | 0–2 | | |
| 18 Nov | 14:00 | South Korea | 0–3 | China | 19–21 | 15–21 | | 11–21 | 11–21 | | 15–21 | 15–21 | |

=== Knockout round ===
Semifinals
19 November
Indonesia | 1
China | 2
19 November
Thailand | 2
Vietnam | 0

Final
20 November
China | 0
Thailand | 2

==== Semifinals ====
| Date | Time | | Score | | Regu 1 | | | Regu 2 | | | Regu 3 | | |
| Date | Time | | Score | | Set 1 | Set 2 | Set 3 | Set 1 | Set 2 | Set 3 | Set 1 | Set 2 | Set 3 |
|---|---|---|---|---|---|---|---|---|---|---|---|---|---|
| 19 Nov | 08:30 | Indonesia | 1–2 | China | 2–1 | | | 0–2 | | | 0–2 | | |
| 19 Nov | 08:30 | Indonesia | 1–2 | China | 21–17 | 19–21 | 15–13 | 19–21 | 14–21 | | 15–21 | 12–21 | |
| 19 Nov | 08:30 | Thailand | 2–0 | Vietnam | 2–1 | | | 2–1 | | | | | |
| 19 Nov | 08:30 | Thailand | 2–0 | Vietnam | 21–19 | 19–21 | 17–15 | 21–10 | 18–21 | 15–13 | | | |

==== Final ====
| Date | Time | | Score | | Regu 1 | | | Regu 2 | | | Regu 3 | | |
| Date | Time | | Score | | Set 1 | Set 2 | Set 3 | Set 1 | Set 2 | Set 3 | Set 1 | Set 2 | Set 3 |
|---|---|---|---|---|---|---|---|---|---|---|---|---|---|
| 20 Nov | 08:30 | China | 0–2 | Thailand | 0–2 | | | 0–2 | | | | | |
| 20 Nov | 08:30 | China | 0–2 | Thailand | 10–21 | 16–21 | | 17–21 | 11–21 | | | | |
