= Susyana Tjhan =

Indonesian wushu practitioner

Personal information
- National team: Indonesia
- Born: 19 November 1984 (age 41) Jakarta, Indonesia
- Height: 160 cm (5 ft 3 in)
- Weight: 54 kg (119 lb)

Sport
- Sport: Wushu
- Event: Changquan
- Team: Indonesia wushu team
Medal record
Women's wushu taolu
Representing Indonesia
Olympic Games (unofficial)
Bronze medal – third place	2008 Beijing	Changquan
World Games
Bronze medal – third place	2009 Kaohsiung	Changquan
World Combat Games
Bronze medal – third place	2010 Beijing	Changquan
World Championships
Bronze medal – third place	2009 Toronto	Jianshu
Asian Games
Silver medal – second place	2006 Doha	CQ All-Around
Bronze medal – third place	2010 Guangzhou	Changquan
Asian Championships
Bronze medal – third place	2004 Yangon	Gunshu
Bronze medal – third place	2008 Macau	Qiangshu
SEA Games
Gold medal – first place	2001 Kuala Lumpur	Gunshu
Gold medal – first place	2009 Vientianne	Changquan
Gold medal – first place	2011 Jakarta–Palembang	Jianshu+Qiangshu
Silver medal – second place	2003 Hanoi	Jianshu
Silver medal – second place	2003 Hanoi	Gunshu
Silver medal – second place	2005 Manila	Changquan
Silver medal – second place	2005 Manila	Jianshu
Silver medal – second place	2005 Manila	Gunshu
Silver medal – second place	2011 Jakarta–Palembang	Changquan
Bronze medal – third place	2001 Kuala Lumpur	Daoshu
Bronze medal – third place	2007 Nakhon Ratchasima	Changquan

Susyana Tjhan (born 19 November 1984) is an Indonesian former wushu taolu athlete. She won the bronze medal at the 2008 Beijing Wushu Tournament, that was held in tandem with the 2008 Summer Olympic, in the women's changquan event. She became champion at the 2001 SEA Games, where she also won a bronze medal and became again champion at the 2009 SEA Games. She won the silver medal at the 2006 Asian Games and the silver medal at the 2010 Asian Games. At the 2009 World Games she won the bronze medal.
