= Brunei at the 2010 Asian Games =

- IOC code: BRU
- NOC: Brunei Darussalam National Olympic Council
- Website: www.bruneiolympic.org (in English)

in Guangzhou
- Competitors: 9 in 5 sports

Asian Games appearances (overview)
- 1990; 1994; 1998; 2002; 2006; 2010; 2014; 2018; 2022; 2026

Brunei Darussalam participated in the 2010 Asian Games in Guangzhou, China on 12–27 November 2010.

== Cue Sports ==
=== Men ===
Event	Athlete	First round	Round of 32	Round of 16	Quarterfinals	Semifinals	Final
Event	Athlete	Opposition Result	Opposition Result	Opposition Result	Opposition Result	Opposition Result	Opposition Result
8-ball Pool Singles	Prince Muhtadee Billah	Irsal Afrinneza Nasution (INA); L 0-7	did not advance				
9-ball Pool Singles	Prince Muhtadee Billah	BYE	Masaaki Tanaka (JPN); L 0-9	did not advance			

== Equestrian ==
=== Jumping ===
Individual

Athlete	Horse	Event	Qualifier 1st		Qualifier 2nd		Qualifier Total		Final						Jump-off		
Athlete	Horse	Event	Qualifier 1st		Qualifier 2nd		Qualifier Total		Round A		Round B		Total A + B		Jump-off		
Athlete	Horse	Event	Penalties	Rank	Penalties	Rank	Penalties	Rank	Penalties	Rank	Penalties	Rank	Penalties	Rank	Penalties	Time	Rank
Pg Mohd Nasir Jaafar	Rudolf Z	Individual	6.00	22nd	6.00	18th	12.00	20th	9.00	16th	4.00	5th	13.00	11th			

== Fencing ==
=== Men ===
Event	Athlete	Round of Poules		Round of 32	Round of 16	Quarterfinals	Semifinals	Final
Event	Athlete	Result	Seed	Opposition Score	Opposition Score	Opposition Score	Opposition Score	Opposition Score
Mohd. Yunos	Individual sabre	1 V - 4 D	16th Q	KMHS Alshamalan (KUW); W 15-7	Bon Gil Gu (KOR); L 6-15	did not advance		

== Karate ==
=== Men ===
Athlete	Event	Round of 32	Round of 16	Quarterfinals	Semifinals	Final
Athlete	Event	Opposition Result	Opposition Result	Opposition Result	Opposition Result	Opposition Result
Muhammad Fidaiy Haji Sanif	Men's −60 kg	Binod Maharjan (NEP); L PTS 0-3	did not advance			
Muhammad Fadillah Haji Sanif	Men's −67 kg	BYE	Karem Othman (SYR); L PTS 1-2	did not advance		
Mainudin HJ Mohamad	Men's −75 kg	BYE	Ko Matsuhisa (JPN); W HAS 4-0	Ka Wai Lee (HKG); L KIK 0-0	did not advance	
Mohammad Jamil HJ Abd Hamid	Men's −84 kg	BYE	Mohd Hatta Mahamut (MAS); L PTS 1-9	did not advance		

== Wushu ==
=== Women ===
Changquan

Athlete	Event	Changquan		Total	
Athlete	Event	Result	Rank	Result	Rank
Lee Ying Shi	Changquan	7.72	11th	7.72	11th

Nanquan\Nandao

Athlete	Event	Nanquan		Nandao		Total	
Athlete	Event	Result	Rank	Result	Rank	Result	Rank
Faustina Woo Wai Sii	Nanquan\Nangun All-Round	8.30	9th	7.60	9th	15.90	9th
