= Myanmar at the 2010 Asian Games =

- IOC code: MYA
- NOC: Myanmar Olympic Committee

in Guangzhou
- Competitors: 80 in 10 sports
- Medals Ranked 22nd: Gold 2 Silver 5 Bronze 3 Total 10

Asian Games appearances (overview)
- 1951; 1954; 1958; 1962; 1966; 1970; 1974; 1978; 1982; 1986; 1990; 1994; 1998; 2002; 2006; 2010; 2014; 2018; 2022; 2026

Myanmar participated at the 16th Asian Games in Guangzhou, China. It won 2 gold, 5 silver and 3 bronze medals.

== Medalists ==
Medal	Name	Sport	Event	Date
Gold	Si Thu Lin, Zaw Lat, Zaw Zaw Aung	Sepaktakraw	Men's Doubles	27 November
Gold	Kyu Kyu Thin, May Zin Phyoe, Phyu Phyu Than	Sepaktakraw	Women's Doubles	27 November
Silver	Nay Thway Oo Oo	Cue sports	English Billiards	14 November
Silver	Sandi Oo Oo	Wushu	Women's Changquan	14 November
Silver	Myanmar	Dragon boat	Men's 1000m Straight Race	18 November
Silver	Myanmar	Dragon boat	Men's 500m Straight Race	19 November
Silver	Myanmar	Dragon boat	Men's 250m Straight Race	20 November
Bronze	Kyaw Oo Oo	Cue sports	English Billiards	14 November
Bronze	Aung Cho Myint, Aung Myo Swe, Si Thu Lin, Zaw Lat, Zaw Zaw Aung	Sepaktakraw	Men's Regu	24 November
Bronze	Ei Thin Zar, Kay Zin Htut, Kyu Kyu Thin, May Zin Phyoe, Naing Naing Win	Sepaktakraw	Women's Regu	24 November
