= Saudi Arabia at the 2010 Asian Games =

- IOC code: KSA
- NOC: Saudi Arabian Olympic Committee

in Guangzhou
- Medals Ranked 13th: Gold 5 Silver 3 Bronze 5 Total 13

Asian Games appearances (overview)
- 1978; 1982; 1986; 1990; 1994; 1998; 2002; 2006; 2010; 2014; 2018; 2022; 2026

Saudi Arabia participated in the 16th Asian Games in Guangzhou, China from 12 to 27 November 2010. It won 5 gold, 3 silver and 5 bronze medals.

== Medalists ==
Medal	Name	Sport	Event	Date
Gold	Ramzy Hamad Al Duhami; Khaled Abdulazziz Al Eid; S. Hrh P Abdullah Moteb Al; Abdullah W Al Sharbatli	Equestrian	Jumping Team	22 November
Gold	Mohammed Shaween	Athletics	Men's 1500m	23 November
Gold	Sultan A Alhabashi	Athletics	Men's Shot Put	26 November
Gold	Saudi Arabia	Athletics	Men's 4 × 400 m Relay	26 November
Gold	Ramzy Hamad Al Duhami	Equestrian	Jumping Individual	24 November
Silver	Yasir Baalghayth A Alnashri	Athletics	Men's 100m	22 November
Silver	Bandar Yahya Sharahili	Athletics	Men's 400m Hurdles	25 November
Silver	Emad Mohammed Almalki	Karate	Men's -55 kg	24 November
Bronze	Yousef Masrahi	Athletics	Men's 400m	22 November
Bronze	Ali Ahmad S Alamri	Athletics	Men's 3000m Steeplechase	23 November
Bronze	Hussain Taher Alsaba	Athletics	Men's Long Jump	24 November
Bronze	Fahad A Alkhathami	Karate	Men's -67 kg	25 November
Bronze	Khaled Abdulaziz Al Eid	Equestrian	Jumping Individual	24 November
