= Vietnam at the 2010 Asian Games =

- IOC code: VIE
- NOC: Vietnam Olympic Committee
- Website: www.voc.org.vn (in Vietnamese and English)

in Guangzhou
- Competitors: 260 in 26 sports
- Officials: 132
- Medals Ranked 24th: Gold 1 Silver 17 Bronze 15 Total 33

Asian Games appearances (overview)
- 1954; 1958; 1962; 1966; 1970; 1974; 1978; 1982; 1986; 1990; 1994; 1998; 2002; 2006; 2010; 2014; 2018; 2022; 2026

Vietnam participated in the 2010 Asian Games in Guangzhou on 12–27 November 2010.

== Medal table ==
Sport	Gold	Silver	Bronze	Total
Karate	1	1	1	3
Athletics	0	3	2	5
Shooting	0	2	1	3
Rowing	0	2	0	2
Cue Sports	0	0	2	2
Wushu	0	4	4	8
Wrestling	0	1	0	1
Chess	0	1	1	2
Sepaktakraw	0	1	1	2
Taekwondo	0	1	3	1
Xiangqi	0	1	0	1
Total	1	17	15	33

== Medalists ==
Medal	Name	Sport	Event	Date
Gold	Lê Bích Phương	Karate	Women's -55 kg	25 November
Silver	Hà Minh Thành	Shooting	Men's 25m Rapid Fire Pistol	15 November
Silver	Cù Thị Thanh Tú; Đặng Hồng Hà; Nguyễn Thị Thu Hằng	Shooting	Women's 10m Running Target Team	15 November
Silver	Nguyễn Thanh Tùng	Wushu	Men's Taijiquan\Taijijian All-Round	16 November
Silver	Nguyễn Thị Bích	Wushu	Women's Sanshou 52kg	17 November
Silver	Phan Văn Hậu	Wushu	Men's Sanshou 56kg	17 November
Silver	Nguyễn Văn Tuấn	Wushu	Men's Sanshou 65kg	17 November
Silver	Lê Quang Liêm	Chess	Men's Individual	16 November
Silver	Vũ Thị Hương	Athletics	Women's 200m	25 November
Silver	Trương Thanh Hằng	Athletics	Women's 800m	25 November
Silver	Trương Thanh Hằng	Athletics	Women's 1500m	23 November
Silver	Vũ Thị Nguyệt Ánh	Karate	Women's -50 kg	25 November
Silver	Phạm Thị Hài; Đặng Thị Thắm; Nguyễn Thị Hữu; Trần Thị Sâm	Rowing	LightWeight Women's Quadruple Sculls	19 November
Silver	Phạm Thị Thảo; Phạm Thị Huệ	Rowing	Women's Double Sculls	18 November
Silver	Lại Thị Huyền Trang; Lưu Thị Thanh; Nguyễn Thị Bích Thủy; Nguyễn Thịnh Thu Ba; Nguyễn Hải Thảo	Sepaktakraw	Women's Regu	24 November
Silver	Nguyễn Thị Hoài Thu	Taekwondo	Women's Under 53kg	18 November
Silver	Nguyễn Thị Lụa	Wrestling	Women's Freestyle 48 kg	25 November
Silver	Nguyễn Thành Bảo	Xiangqi	Men's Individual	19 November
Bronze	Hà Minh Thành; Phạm Anh Đạt; Bùi Quang Nam	Shooting	Men's 25m Rapid Fire Pistol Team	15 November
Bronze	Phạm Quốc Khánh	Wushu	Men's Nanquan\Nangun All-Round	15 November
Bronze	Nguyễn Mạnh Quyền	Wushu	Men's Daoshu\Gunshu All-Round	14 November
Bronze	Nguyễn Minh Thông	Wushu	Men's Sanshou 60kg	17 November
Bronze	Vương Đình Khánh	Wushu	Men's Sanshou 70kg	17 November
Bronze	Lý Thế Vinh	Cue Sport	Men's Carom 3 Cushion Singles	14 November
Bronze	Dương Anh Vũ	Cue Sport	Men's Carom 3 Cushion Singles	14 November
Bronze	Vũ Thị Hương	Athletics	Women's 100m	22 November
Bronze	Vũ Văn Huyện	Athletics	Men's Decathlon	25 November
Bronze	Hoàng Thị Bảo Trâm; Phạm Lê Thảo Nguyên; Nguyễn Thị Thanh An; Nguyễn Thị Mai Hưng; Nguyễn Thị Tường Vân	Chess	Women's Team	26 November
Bronze	Trần Minh Đức	Karate	Men's -60 kg	25 November
Bronze	Lại Thị Huyền Trang; Đinh Thị Thúy Hằng; Lưu Thị Thanh; Nguyễn Thị Thúy An; Nguyễn Thị Hạnh Ngân; Nguyễn Thị Bích Thủy; Nguyễn Thịnh Thu Ba; Nguyễn Hải Thảo; Lê Thị Hạnh; Nguyễn Thị Dung; Trương Thị Vân; Nguyễn Bạch Vân	Sepaktakraw	Women's Team	19 November
Bronze	Vũ Thị Hậu	Taekwondo	Women's Under 49kg	17 November
Bronze	Dương Thanh Tâm	Taekwondo	Men's Under 74kg	17 November
Bronze	Nguyễn Trọng Cương	Taekwondo	Men's Under 87kg	17 November
