= Dragon boat at the Asian Games =

- Governing bodies: IDBF (World) / ADBF (Asia)
- Events: 6 (men: 3; women: 3)

Games
- 1951; 1954; 1958; 1962; 1966; 1970; 1974; 1978; 1982; 1986; 1990; 1994; 1998; 2002; 2006; 2010; 2014; 2018; 2022; 2026
- Medalists

Dragon boat was an Asian Games sport in 2010, 2018 and 2022 editions.

== Editions ==
Games	Year	Host city	Best nation
XVI	2010	Guangzhou, China	Indonesia
XVIII	2018	Jakarta–Palembang, Indonesia	China
XIX	2022	Hangzhou, China	China

== Events ==
Event	10	18	22	Years
Men's 200 m		X	X	2
Men's 250 m	X			1
Men's 500 m	X	X	X	3
Men's 1000 m	X	X	X	3
Women's 200 m		X	X	2
Women's 250 m	X			1
Women's 500 m	X	X	X	3
Women's 1000 m	X		X	2
Total	6	5	6	

== Medal table ==
Rank	Nation	Gold	Silver	Bronze	Total
1	China (CHN)	10	3	2	15
2	Indonesia (INA)	4	9	2	15
3	Chinese Taipei (TPE)	2	1	0	3
4	Korea (COR)	1	0	2	3
5	Myanmar (MYA)	0	3	2	5
6	Thailand (THA)	0	1	7	8
7	South Korea (KOR)	0	0	2	2
Totals (7 entries)		17	17	17	51

== Participating nations ==
Nation	10	18	22	Years
Cambodia			14	1
China	47	32	28	3
Chinese Taipei	24	32	14	3
Hong Kong	24	29	28	3
India		31		1
Indonesia	48	32	28	3
Iran	48			1
Japan	24			1
Korea		32		1
Macau	48		28	2
Malaysia		32	14	2
Myanmar	24	30	28	3
North Korea			28	1
Philippines		27		1
Singapore	48	32	27	3
South Korea	24		28	2
Thailand	48	32	28	3
Number of nations	11	11	12	
Number of athletes	407	341	293	
