= List of Asian Games medalists in dragon boat =

This is the complete list of Asian Games medalists in dragon boat from 2010 to 2022.

== Men ==
=== 200 m ===
- Small boat: 2018–2022

Games	Gold	Silver	Bronze
2018 Jakarta–Palembang	China (CHN); Jiao Fangxu; Gao Jiawen; Cai Wenxuan; Liu Xuegang; Du Zhuan; Yin Zhonghai; Zhang Zhen; Zeng Delin; Chen Guangqin; Su Bopin; Li Shuai; Chen Juntong; Ling Wenwei; Feng Guojing; Li Guisen; Zhou Guichao	Chinese Taipei (TPE); Yin Wan-ting; Wu Wei-min; Wu Chun-chieh; Wu Chen-po; Tuan Yen-yu; Lin Sheng-ru; Lin Min-hao; Ho Chia-lin; Chuang Ying-chieh; Chou En-ping; Chou Chih-wei; Chien Cheng-yen; Chen Chou Yueh-hung; Chen Yu-an; Chen Tzu-hsien; Chang Sheng-huang	Thailand (THA); Natthawat Waenphrom; Chaiyakarn Choochuen; Asdawut Mitilee; Santas Mingwongyang; Laor Iamluek; Ekkapong Wongunjai; Wasan Upalasueb; Phakdee Wannamanee; Nares Naoprakon; Phawonrat Roddee; Tanawoot Waipinid; Nattawut Kaewsri; Kasemsit Borriboonwasin; Pornchai Tesdee; Vinya Seechomchuen; Boonsong Imtim
2022 Hangzhou	China (CHN); Chen Fangjia; Chen Zihuan; Feng Chaochao; Li Chuan; Liu Yu; Lü Luhui; Shu Liang; Sun Jiahao; Wang Liang; Wang Xiaodong; Yang Hailei; Yu Haijie; Zhang Zhicheng; Zheng Jiaxin	Thailand (THA); Sukon Boonem; Kasemsit Borriboonwasin; Chaiyakarn Choochuen; Suradet Faengnoi; Pornprom Kramsuk; Natthapon Kreepkamrai; Suwan Kwanthong; Phatthara Sangdet; Somchai Sangmuang; Chitsanupong Sangpan; Nopphadol Sangthuang; Vinya Seechomchuen; Pornchai Tesdee; Phakdee Wannamanee	Indonesia (INA); Joko Andriyanto; Muh Burhan; Tri Wahyu Buwono; Yuda Firmansyah; Mugi Harjito; Harjuna; Andri Agus Mulyana; Angga Suwandi Putra; Maizir Riyondra; Dedi Saputra; Indra Tri Setiawan; Sofiyanto; Sutrisno; Zubakri

=== 250 m ===
- Standard boat: 2010

Games	Gold	Silver	Bronze
2010 Guangzhou	Indonesia (INA); Ajurahman; Alkarmani; Arifriyadi; Asnawir; Abdul Azis; Asep Hidayat; Iwan Husin; Jaslin; Marjuki; John Feter Matulessy; Spens Stuber Mehue; Erwin David Monim; Muchlis; Eka Octarianus; Pendrota Putra Kusuma; Ikhwan Randi; Didin Rusdiana; Silo; Japerry Siregar; Andri Sugiarto; Ahmad Supriadi; Dedi Kurniawan Suyatno; Syarifuddin; Anwar Tarra	Myanmar (MYA); Kyaw Thu Aung; Than Aung; Win Htut Aung; Aung Zaw Aye; Win Htike; Kyaw Myo Khaing; Aung Ko; Naing Lin; Tun Tun Lin; Aung Ko Min; Zaw Min; Khin Maung Myint; Zaw Naing; Yan Paing; Saw Khay Sha; Aung Lwin Soe; Kyaw Soe; Ye Aung Soe; Kyaw Lin Tun; Shwe Hla Win; Thaung Win; Min Min Zaw; Myo Zaw; Naing Naing Zaw	China (CHN); Guan Xiangting; Hu Jiaoxin; Huang Chentao; Ji Pinghe; Liang Xianqi; Liu Peisong; Liu Yaosen; Luo Juncheng; Ou Shuangan; Pan Huijun; Pan Zhanquan; Su Bopin; Su Boyuan; Tan Shichao; Tan Shipeng; Wei Le; Wu Guochong; Wu Jiexiong; Wu Jinxiong; Zeng Runfa; Zhou Dezi; Zhou Qizhi; Zhou Xingqiang

=== 500 m ===
- Standard boat: 2010
- Small boat: 2018–2022

Games	Gold	Silver	Bronze
2010 Guangzhou	Indonesia (INA); Ajurahman; Alkarmani; Arifriyadi; Asnawir; Abdul Azis; Asep Hidayat; Iwan Husin; Jaslin; Marjuki; John Feter Matulessy; Spens Stuber Mehue; Erwin David Monim; Muchlis; Eka Octarianus; Pendrota Putra Kusuma; Ikhwan Randi; Didin Rusdiana; Silo; Japerry Siregar; Andri Sugiarto; Ahmad Supriadi; Dedi Kurniawan Suyatno; Syarifuddin; Anwar Tarra	Myanmar (MYA); Kyaw Thu Aung; Than Aung; Win Htut Aung; Aung Zaw Aye; Win Htike; Kyaw Myo Khaing; Aung Ko; Naing Lin; Tun Tun Lin; Aung Ko Min; Zaw Min; Khin Maung Myint; Zaw Naing; Yan Paing; Saw Khay Sha; Aung Lwin Soe; Kyaw Soe; Ye Aung Soe; Kyaw Lin Tun; Shwe Hla Win; Thaung Win; Min Min Zaw; Myo Zaw; Naing Naing Zaw	China (CHN); Guan Xiangting; Hu Jiaoxin; Huang Chentao; Ji Pinghe; Liang Xianqi; Liu Peisong; Liu Yaosen; Luo Juncheng; Ou Shuangan; Pan Huijun; Pan Zhanquan; Su Bopin; Su Boyuan; Tan Shichao; Tan Shipeng; Wei Le; Wu Guochong; Wu Jiexiong; Wu Jinxiong; Zeng Runfa; Zhou Dezi; Zhou Qizhi; Zhou Xingqiang
2018 Jakarta–Palembang	Chinese Taipei (TPE); Yin Wan-ting; Wu Wei-min; Wu Chun-chieh; Wu Chen-po; Tuan Yen-yu; Lin Sheng-ru; Lin Min-hao; Ho Chia-lin; Chuang Ying-chieh; Chou En-ping; Chou Chih-wei; Chien Cheng-yen; Chen Chou Yueh-hung; Chen Yu-an; Chen Tzu-hsien; Chang Sheng-huang	China (CHN); Jiao Fangxu; Gao Jiawen; Cai Wenxuan; Liu Xuegang; Du Zhuan; Yin Zhonghai; Zhang Zhen; Zeng Delin; Chen Guangqin; Su Bopin; Li Shuai; Chen Juntong; Ling Wenwei; Feng Guojing; Li Guisen; Zhou Guichao	Indonesia (INA); Mochamad Taufan Wijaya; Anwar Tarra; Sutrisno; Syahrul Saputra; Dedi Saputra; Muhammad Yunus Rustandi; Andri Agus Mulyana; Poliyansyah; Erwin David Monim; Marjuki; Yuda Firmansyah; Arpan; Spens Stuber Mehue; Medi Juana; Muhammad Fajar Faturahman; Rio Akbar
2022 Hangzhou	China (CHN); Chen Fangjia; Chen Zihuan; Feng Chaochao; Li Chuan; Liu Yu; Lü Luhui; Shu Liang; Sun Jiahao; Wang Liang; Wang Xiaodong; Yang Hailei; Yu Haijie; Zhang Zhicheng; Zheng Jiaxin	Indonesia (INA); Joko Andriyanto; Muh Burhan; Tri Wahyu Buwono; Yuda Firmansyah; Mugi Harjito; Harjuna; Andri Agus Mulyana; Angga Suwandi Putra; Maizir Riyondra; Dedi Saputra; Indra Tri Setiawan; Sofiyanto; Sutrisno; Zubakri	Thailand (THA); Sukon Boonem; Kasemsit Borriboonwasin; Chaiyakarn Choochuen; Suradet Faengnoi; Pornprom Kramsuk; Natthapon Kreepkamrai; Suwan Kwanthong; Phatthara Sangdet; Somchai Sangmuang; Chitsanupong Sangpan; Nopphadol Sangthuang; Vinya Seechomchuen; Pornchai Tesdee; Phakdee Wannamanee

=== 1000 m ===
- Standard boat: 2010
- Small boat: 2018–2022

Games	Gold	Silver	Bronze
2010 Guangzhou	Indonesia (INA); Ajurahman; Alkarmani; Arifriyadi; Asnawir; Abdul Azis; Asep Hidayat; Iwan Husin; Jaslin; Marjuki; John Feter Matulessy; Spens Stuber Mehue; Erwin David Monim; Muchlis; Eka Octarianus; Pendrota Putra Kusuma; Ikhwan Randi; Didin Rusdiana; Silo; Japerry Siregar; Andri Sugiarto; Ahmad Supriadi; Dedi Kurniawan Suyatno; Syarifuddin; Anwar Tarra	Myanmar (MYA); Kyaw Thu Aung; Than Aung; Win Htut Aung; Aung Zaw Aye; Win Htike; Kyaw Myo Khaing; Aung Ko; Naing Lin; Tun Tun Lin; Aung Ko Min; Zaw Min; Khin Maung Myint; Zaw Naing; Yan Paing; Saw Khay Sha; Aung Lwin Soe; Kyaw Soe; Ye Aung Soe; Kyaw Lin Tun; Shwe Hla Win; Thaung Win; Min Min Zaw; Myo Zaw; Naing Naing Zaw	South Korea (KOR); Byeon Hong-kyun; Gu Ja-uk; Hyun Jae-chan; Jeong Seung-gyun; Kim Chang-soo; Kim Hyun-soo; Kim Seon-ho; Kim Yong-hyun; Kim Yu-ho; Lee Byung-tak; Lee Hyun-woo; Lee Seong-won; Lee Suk-hwan; Oh Byung-hoon; Oh Joong-dae; Park Ho-gi; Park Jeong-hoon; Park Jeong-keun; Park Min-ho; Shim Dae-seop; Shin Heon-sub; Shin Yun-gyu; Song Myeong-chan; Yang Byung-doo
2018 Jakarta–Palembang	Chinese Taipei (TPE); Yin Wan-ting; Wu Wei-min; Wu Chun-chieh; Wu Chen-po; Tuan Yen-yu; Lin Sheng-ru; Lin Min-hao; Ho Chia-lin; Chuang Ying-chieh; Chou En-ping; Chou Chih-wei; Chien Cheng-yen; Chen Chou Yueh-hung; Chen Yu-an; Chen Tzu-hsien; Chang Sheng-huang	Indonesia (INA); Mochamad Taufan Wijaya; Anwar Tarra; Sutrisno; Syahrul Saputra; Dedi Saputra; Muhammad Yunus Rustandi; Andri Agus Mulyana; Poliyansyah; Erwin David Monim; Marjuki; Yuda Firmansyah; Arpan; Spens Stuber Mehue; Medi Juana; Muhammad Fajar Faturahman; Rio Akbar	Korea (COR); Yang Chol-jin; Ri Yong-hyok; Paek Won-ryol; O In-guk; Kim Pu-song; Kim Jin-il; Jon Chung-hyok; Choe Kyong-uk; Lee Hyeon-joo; Yeom Hee-tae; Park Cheol-min; An Hyun-jin; Shin Dong-jin; Kim Yong-gil; Jung Hoon-seock; Shin Seong-woo
2022 Hangzhou	Indonesia (INA); Joko Andriyanto; Muh Burhan; Tri Wahyu Buwono; Yuda Firmansyah; Mugi Harjito; Harjuna; Andri Agus Mulyana; Angga Suwandi Putra; Maizir Riyondra; Dedi Saputra; Indra Tri Setiawan; Sofiyanto; Sutrisno; Zubakri	China (CHN); Chen Fangjia; Chen Zihuan; Feng Chaochao; Li Chuan; Liu Yu; Lü Luhui; Shu Liang; Sun Jiahao; Wang Liang; Wang Xiaodong; Yang Hailei; Yu Haijie; Zhang Zhicheng; Zheng Jiaxin	Myanmar (MYA); Hein Soe; Htoo Htoo Aung; Myint Ko Ko; Myo Hlaing Win; Naing Lin Oo; Pyae Phyo Thant; Pyae Sone Aung; Saw Kaung Kaung San; Saw Moe Aung; Saw Niang Lin Kyaw; Thant Zin Oo; Tin Ko Ko; Yu Ya Maung; Zaw Zaw Tun

== Women ==
=== 200 m ===
- Small boat: 2018–2022

Games	Gold	Silver	Bronze
2018 Jakarta–Palembang	China (CHN); Peng Xiaojuan; Dong Aili; Chen Chen; Wang Jing; Wang Li; Xu Fengxue; Zhong Yuan; Chen Xue; Tang Shenglan; Song Yanbing; Liang Liping; Huang Yi; Hu Chen; Bai Ge; Pan Huizhu; Li Lianying	Indonesia (INA); Ririn Puji Astuti; Since Lithasova Yom; Ramla B Fazriah Nurbayan; Alvonsina Monim; Stevani Maysche Ibo; Masripah; Shifa Garnika Nurkarim; Christina Kafolakari; Selvianti Devi Hidayat; Raudani Fitra; Astri Dwijayanti; Emiliana Deau; Aswiati; Riana Yulistrian; Risti Ardianti	Korea (COR); To Myong-suk; Yun Un-jong; Ri Hyang; Kim Su-hyang; Jong Ye-song; Ho Su-jong; Cha Un-yong; Cha Un-gyong; Hyun Jae-chan; Kang Cho-hee; Lee Ye-lin; Choi Yu-seul; Jang Hyun-jung; Byun Eun-jeong; Jo Min-ji; Kim Hyeon-hee
2022 Hangzhou	China (CHN); Cheng Lingzhi; Ding Sijie; Fan Yiting; Li Shuqi; Li Zhixian; Luo Meng; Shi Yingying; Sun Yang; Wang Ji; Wang Li; Wang Ying; Xue Lina; Yu Shimeng; Zhu Xiaoli	Indonesia (INA); Ramla Baharuddin; Ester Yustince Daimoi; Iin Rosiana Damiri; Dayumin; Raudani Fitra; Nadia Hafiza; Maryati; Sella Monim; Cinta Priendtisca Nayomi; Fazriah Nurbayan; Ratih; Ayuning Tika Vihari; Reski Wahyuni; Anisa Yulistiawan	Thailand (THA); Jaruwan Chaikan; Ketkanok Chomchey; Jirawan Hankhamla; Praewpan Kawsri; Watcharaporn Khadtiya; Pranchalee Moonkasem; Patthama Nanthain; Nipaporn Nopsri; Arisara Pantulap; Sukanya Poradok; Anuthida Saeheng; Thitima Sukrat; Onuma Teeranaew; Benjamas Woranuch

=== 250 m ===
- Standard boat: 2010

Games	Gold	Silver	Bronze
2010 Guangzhou	China (CHN); Cao Lina; Chen Lulu; Cong Linlin; Huang Yi; Li Jiadai; Li Yuanyuan; Liang Liping; Liang Zhuanhao; Liang Ziyu; Liu Jia; Liu Xuelian; Lun Jinyi; Luo Xin; Peng Chun; Qu Xue; Song Yanbing; Wang Lin; Wu Yongfang; Xia Shiying; Yu Zhanxin; Zhang Guolong; Zhao Yanna; Zhou Yamin; Zhu Songsong	Indonesia (INA); Wina Apriani; Sarce Aronggear; Dayumin; Astri Dwijayanti; Yulanda Ester Entong; Farida; Raudani Fitra; Fitri Ayu; Hasnah; Tika Inderiyani; Yunita Kadop; Masripah; Minawati; Novita Sari; Ririn Nurparida; Cici Pramita; Riska Elpia Ramadani; Royani Rais; Rasima; Salwiah; Kanti Santyawati; Suhartati; Wahyuni; Since Litashova Yom	Thailand (THA); Chariyarat Ananchai; Sairawee Boonplong; Nattakant Boonruang; Woraporn Boonyuhong; Jaruwan Chaikan; Kornkaew Chantaniyom; Pet Kawong; Auncharee Khuntathong; Sirinya Klongjaroen; Pemika Metsuwan; Pranchalee Moonkasem; Pratumrat Nakuy; Narissara Namsilee; Nipaporn Nopsri; Tanaporn Panid; Supatra Pholsil; Ngamfah Photha; Pattaya Sangkumma; Ravisara Sungsuwan; Rungpailin Sungsuwan; Kanya Tachuenchit; Chutikan Thanawanutpong; Suporn Thussoongnern; Patcharee Tippayamonton

=== 500 m ===
- Standard boat: 2010
- Small boat: 2018–2022

Games	Gold	Silver	Bronze
2010 Guangzhou	China (CHN); Cao Lina; Chen Lulu; Cong Linlin; Huang Yi; Li Jiadai; Li Yuanyuan; Liang Liping; Liang Zhuanhao; Liang Ziyu; Liu Jia; Liu Xuelian; Lun Jinyi; Luo Xin; Peng Chun; Qu Xue; Song Yanbing; Wang Lin; Wu Yongfang; Xia Shiying; Yu Zhanxin; Zhang Guolong; Zhao Yanna; Zhou Yamin; Zhu Songsong	Indonesia (INA); Wina Apriani; Sarce Aronggear; Dayumin; Astri Dwijayanti; Yulanda Ester Entong; Farida; Raudani Fitra; Fitri Ayu; Hasnah; Tika Inderiyani; Yunita Kadop; Masripah; Minawati; Novita Sari; Ririn Nurparida; Cici Pramita; Riska Elpia Ramadani; Royani Rais; Rasima; Salwiah; Kanti Santyawati; Suhartati; Wahyuni; Since Litashova Yom	Thailand (THA); Chariyarat Ananchai; Sairawee Boonplong; Nattakant Boonruang; Woraporn Boonyuhong; Jaruwan Chaikan; Kornkaew Chantaniyom; Pet Kawong; Auncharee Khuntathong; Sirinya Klongjaroen; Pemika Metsuwan; Pranchalee Moonkasem; Pratumrat Nakuy; Narissara Namsilee; Nipaporn Nopsri; Tanaporn Panid; Supatra Pholsil; Ngamfah Photha; Pattaya Sangkumma; Ravisara Sungsuwan; Rungpailin Sungsuwan; Kanya Tachuenchit; Chutikan Thanawanutpong; Suporn Thussoongnern; Patcharee Tippayamonton
2018 Jakarta–Palembang	Korea (COR); To Myong-suk; Yun Un-jong; Ri Hyang; Kim Su-hyang; Jong Ye-song; Ho Su-jong; Cha Un-yong; Cha Un-gyong; Hyun Jae-chan; Kang Cho-hee; Lee Ye-lin; Choi Yu-seul; Jang Hyun-jung; Byun Eun-jeong; Jo Min-ji; Kim Hyeon-hee	China (CHN); Peng Xiaojuan; Dong Aili; Chen Chen; Wang Jing; Wang Li; Xu Fengxue; Zhong Yuan; Chen Xue; Tang Shenglan; Song Yanbing; Liang Liping; Huang Yi; Hu Chen; Bai Ge; Pan Huizhu; Li Lianying	Thailand (THA); Kanittha Nennoo; Nipatcha Pootong; Nipaporn Nopsri; Pranchalee Moonkasem; Wararat Plodpai; Wanida Thammarat; Prapaporn Pumkhunthod; Suphatthra Kheha; Patthama Nanthain; Praewpan Kawsri; Nattakant Boonruang; Mintra Mannok; Jariya Kankasikam; Arisara Pantulap; Saowanee Khamsaeng; Jaruwan Chaikan
2022 Hangzhou	China (CHN); Cheng Lingzhi; Ding Sijie; Fan Yiting; Li Shuqi; Li Zhixian; Luo Meng; Shi Yingying; Sun Yang; Wang Ji; Wang Li; Wang Ying; Xue Lina; Yu Shimeng; Zhu Xiaoli	Indonesia (INA); Ramla Baharuddin; Ester Yustince Daimoi; Iin Rosiana Damiri; Dayumin; Raudani Fitra; Nadia Hafiza; Maryati; Sella Monim; Cinta Priendtisca Nayomi; Fazriah Nurbayan; Ratih; Ayuning Tika Vihari; Reski Wahyuni; Anisa Yulistiawan	Myanmar (MYA); Hla Hla Htwe; Khin Su Su Aung; Lin Lin Kyaw; Man Huai Phawng; Moe Ma Ma; Myint Myint Soe; Phyu Phyu Aung; San San Moe; Saw Myat Thu; Soe Sandar; Soe Soe Kyaw; Su Wai Phyo; Thet Phyo Naing; Win Win Htwe

=== 1000 m ===
- Standard boat: 2010
- Small boat: 2022

Games	Gold	Silver	Bronze
2010 Guangzhou	China (CHN); Cao Lina; Chen Lulu; Cong Linlin; Huang Yi; Li Jiadai; Li Yuanyuan; Liang Liping; Liang Zhuanhao; Liang Ziyu; Liu Jia; Liu Xuelian; Lun Jinyi; Luo Xin; Peng Chun; Qu Xue; Song Yanbing; Wang Lin; Wu Yongfang; Xia Shiying; Yu Zhanxin; Zhang Guolong; Zhao Yanna; Zhou Yamin; Zhu Songsong	Indonesia (INA); Wina Apriani; Sarce Aronggear; Dayumin; Astri Dwijayanti; Yulanda Ester Entong; Farida; Raudani Fitra; Fitri Ayu; Hasnah; Tika Inderiyani; Yunita Kadop; Masripah; Minawati; Novita Sari; Ririn Nurparida; Cici Pramita; Riska Elpia Ramadani; Royani Rais; Rasima; Salwiah; Kanti Santyawati; Suhartati; Wahyuni; Since Litashova Yom	Thailand (THA); Chariyarat Ananchai; Sairawee Boonplong; Nattakant Boonruang; Woraporn Boonyuhong; Jaruwan Chaikan; Kornkaew Chantaniyom; Pet Kawong; Auncharee Khuntathong; Sirinya Klongjaroen; Pemika Metsuwan; Pranchalee Moonkasem; Pratumrat Nakuy; Narissara Namsilee; Nipaporn Nopsri; Tanaporn Panid; Supatra Pholsil; Ngamfah Photha; Pattaya Sangkumma; Ravisara Sungsuwan; Rungpailin Sungsuwan; Kanya Tachuenchit; Chutikan Thanawanutpong; Suporn Thussoongnern; Patcharee Tippayamonton
2022 Hangzhou	China (CHN); Cheng Lingzhi; Ding Sijie; Fan Yiting; Li Shuqi; Li Zhixian; Luo Meng; Shi Yingying; Sun Yang; Wang Ji; Wang Li; Wang Ying; Xue Lina; Yu Shimeng; Zhu Xiaoli	Indonesia (INA); Ramla Baharuddin; Ester Yustince Daimoi; Iin Rosiana Damiri; Dayumin; Raudani Fitra; Nadia Hafiza; Maryati; Sella Monim; Cinta Priendtisca Nayomi; Fazriah Nurbayan; Ratih; Ayuning Tika Vihari; Reski Wahyuni; Anisa Yulistiawan	South Korea (KOR); Byun Eun-jeong; Cha Tae-hee; Cho Soo-bin; Han Sol-hee; Jeong Ji-won; Ju Hee; Ju Yun-woo; Kim Da-bin; Kim Hyeon-hee; Kim Yeo-jin; Lee Hyeon-joo; Lim Sung-hwa; Tak Su-jin; Yun Ye-bom
