= Dragon boat at the 2010 Asian Games =

- Venue: Zengcheng Dragon Boat Lake
- Dates: 18–20 November 2010
- Competitors: 407 from 11 nations

Dragon boat at the 2010 Asian Games was held in Guangzhou, China from November 18 to 20, 2010. All events were held at Zengcheng Dragon Boat Lake.

== Schedule ==
H	Heats	R	Repechages	F	Finals

Event↓/Date →	18th Thu			19th Fri			20th Sat		
Men's 250 m							H	R	F
Men's 500 m				H	R	F			
Men's 1000 m	H	R	F						
Women's 250 m							H	R	F
Women's 500 m				H	R	F			
Women's 1000 m	H	R	F						

== Medalists ==
=== Men ===
Event	Gold	Silver	Bronze
250 m	Indonesia; Ajurahman; Alkarmani; Arifriyadi; Asnawir; Abdul Azis; Asep Hidayat; Iwan Husin; Jaslin; Marjuki; John Feter Matulessy; Spens Stuber Mehue; Erwin David Monim; Muchlis; Eka Octarianus; Pendrota Putra Kusuma; Ikhwan Randi; Didin Rusdiana; Silo; Japerry Siregar; Andri Sugiarto; Ahmad Supriadi; Dedi Kurniawan Suyatno; Syarifuddin; Anwar Tarra	Myanmar; Kyaw Thu Aung; Than Aung; Win Htut Aung; Aung Zaw Aye; Win Htike; Kyaw Myo Khaing; Aung Ko; Naing Lin; Tun Tun Lin; Aung Ko Min; Zaw Min; Khin Maung Myint; Zaw Naing; Yan Paing; Saw Khay Sha; Aung Lwin Soe; Kyaw Soe; Ye Aung Soe; Kyaw Lin Tun; Shwe Hla Win; Thaung Win; Min Min Zaw; Myo Zaw; Naing Naing Zaw	China; Guan Xiangting; Hu Jiaoxin; Huang Chentao; Ji Pinghe; Liang Xianqi; Liu Peisong; Liu Yaosen; Luo Juncheng; Ou Shuangan; Pan Huijun; Pan Zhanquan; Su Bopin; Su Boyuan; Tan Shichao; Tan Shipeng; Wei Le; Wu Guochong; Wu Jiexiong; Wu Jinxiong; Zeng Runfa; Zhou Dezi; Zhou Qizhi; Zhou Xingqiang
500 m	Indonesia; Ajurahman; Alkarmani; Arifriyadi; Asnawir; Abdul Azis; Asep Hidayat; Iwan Husin; Jaslin; Marjuki; John Feter Matulessy; Spens Stuber Mehue; Erwin David Monim; Muchlis; Eka Octarianus; Pendrota Putra Kusuma; Ikhwan Randi; Didin Rusdiana; Silo; Japerry Siregar; Andri Sugiarto; Ahmad Supriadi; Dedi Kurniawan Suyatno; Syarifuddin; Anwar Tarra	Myanmar; Kyaw Thu Aung; Than Aung; Win Htut Aung; Aung Zaw Aye; Win Htike; Kyaw Myo Khaing; Aung Ko; Naing Lin; Tun Tun Lin; Aung Ko Min; Zaw Min; Khin Maung Myint; Zaw Naing; Yan Paing; Saw Khay Sha; Aung Lwin Soe; Kyaw Soe; Ye Aung Soe; Kyaw Lin Tun; Shwe Hla Win; Thaung Win; Min Min Zaw; Myo Zaw; Naing Naing Zaw	China; Guan Xiangting; Hu Jiaoxin; Huang Chentao; Ji Pinghe; Liang Xianqi; Liu Peisong; Liu Yaosen; Luo Juncheng; Ou Shuangan; Pan Huijun; Pan Zhanquan; Su Bopin; Su Boyuan; Tan Shichao; Tan Shipeng; Wei Le; Wu Guochong; Wu Jiexiong; Wu Jinxiong; Zeng Runfa; Zhou Dezi; Zhou Qizhi; Zhou Xingqiang
1000 m	Indonesia; Ajurahman; Alkarmani; Arifriyadi; Asnawir; Abdul Azis; Asep Hidayat; Iwan Husin; Jaslin; Marjuki; John Feter Matulessy; Spens Stuber Mehue; Erwin David Monim; Muchlis; Eka Octarianus; Pendrota Putra Kusuma; Ikhwan Randi; Didin Rusdiana; Silo; Japerry Siregar; Andri Sugiarto; Ahmad Supriadi; Dedi Kurniawan Suyatno; Syarifuddin; Anwar Tarra	Myanmar; Kyaw Thu Aung; Than Aung; Win Htut Aung; Aung Zaw Aye; Win Htike; Kyaw Myo Khaing; Aung Ko; Naing Lin; Tun Tun Lin; Aung Ko Min; Zaw Min; Khin Maung Myint; Zaw Naing; Yan Paing; Saw Khay Sha; Aung Lwin Soe; Kyaw Soe; Ye Aung Soe; Kyaw Lin Tun; Shwe Hla Win; Thaung Win; Min Min Zaw; Myo Zaw; Naing Naing Zaw	South Korea; Byeon Hong-kyun; Gu Ja-uk; Hyun Jae-chan; Jeong Seung-gyun; Kim Chang-soo; Kim Hyun-soo; Kim Seon-ho; Kim Yong-hyun; Kim Yu-ho; Lee Byung-tak; Lee Hyun-woo; Lee Seong-won; Lee Suk-hwan; Oh Byung-hoon; Oh Joong-dae; Park Ho-gi; Park Jeong-hoon; Park Jeong-keun; Park Min-ho; Shim Dae-seop; Shin Heon-sub; Shin Yun-gyu; Song Myeong-chan; Yang Byung-doo

=== Women ===
Event	Gold	Silver	Bronze
250 m	China; Cao Lina; Chen Lulu; Cong Linlin; Huang Yi; Li Jiadai; Li Yuanyuan; Liang Liping; Liang Zhuanhao; Liang Ziyu; Liu Jia; Liu Xuelian; Lun Jinyi; Luo Xin; Peng Chun; Qu Xue; Song Yanbing; Wang Lin; Wu Yongfang; Xia Shiying; Yu Zhanxin; Zhang Guolong; Zhao Yanna; Zhou Yamin; Zhu Songsong	Indonesia; Wina Apriani; Sarce Aronggear; Dayumin; Astri Dwijayanti; Yulanda Ester Entong; Farida; Raudani Fitra; Fitri Ayu; Hasnah; Tika Inderiyani; Yunita Kadop; Masripah; Minawati; Novita Sari; Ririn Nurparida; Cici Pramita; Riska Elpia Ramadani; Royani Rais; Rasima; Salwiah; Kanti Santyawati; Suhartati; Wahyuni; Since Litashova Yom	Thailand; Chariyarat Ananchai; Sairawee Boonplong; Nattakant Boonruang; Woraporn Boonyuhong; Jaruwan Chaikan; Kornkaew Chantaniyom; Pet Kawong; Auncharee Khuntathong; Sirinya Klongjaroen; Pemika Metsuwan; Pranchalee Moonkasem; Pratumrat Nakuy; Narissara Namsilee; Nipaporn Nopsri; Tanaporn Panid; Supatra Pholsil; Ngamfah Photha; Pattaya Sangkumma; Ravisara Sungsuwan; Rungpailin Sungsuwan; Kanya Tachuenchit; Chutikan Thanawanutpong; Suporn Thussoongnern; Patcharee Tippayamonton
500 m	China; Cao Lina; Chen Lulu; Cong Linlin; Huang Yi; Li Jiadai; Li Yuanyuan; Liang Liping; Liang Zhuanhao; Liang Ziyu; Liu Jia; Liu Xuelian; Lun Jinyi; Luo Xin; Peng Chun; Qu Xue; Song Yanbing; Wang Lin; Wu Yongfang; Xia Shiying; Yu Zhanxin; Zhang Guolong; Zhao Yanna; Zhou Yamin; Zhu Songsong	Indonesia; Wina Apriani; Sarce Aronggear; Dayumin; Astri Dwijayanti; Yulanda Ester Entong; Farida; Raudani Fitra; Fitri Ayu; Hasnah; Tika Inderiyani; Yunita Kadop; Masripah; Minawati; Novita Sari; Ririn Nurparida; Cici Pramita; Riska Elpia Ramadani; Royani Rais; Rasima; Salwiah; Kanti Santyawati; Suhartati; Wahyuni; Since Litashova Yom	Thailand; Chariyarat Ananchai; Sairawee Boonplong; Nattakant Boonruang; Woraporn Boonyuhong; Jaruwan Chaikan; Kornkaew Chantaniyom; Pet Kawong; Auncharee Khuntathong; Sirinya Klongjaroen; Pemika Metsuwan; Pranchalee Moonkasem; Pratumrat Nakuy; Narissara Namsilee; Nipaporn Nopsri; Tanaporn Panid; Supatra Pholsil; Ngamfah Photha; Pattaya Sangkumma; Ravisara Sungsuwan; Rungpailin Sungsuwan; Kanya Tachuenchit; Chutikan Thanawanutpong; Suporn Thussoongnern; Patcharee Tippayamonton
1000 m	China; Cao Lina; Chen Lulu; Cong Linlin; Huang Yi; Li Jiadai; Li Yuanyuan; Liang Liping; Liang Zhuanhao; Liang Ziyu; Liu Jia; Liu Xuelian; Lun Jinyi; Luo Xin; Peng Chun; Qu Xue; Song Yanbing; Wang Lin; Wu Yongfang; Xia Shiying; Yu Zhanxin; Zhang Guolong; Zhao Yanna; Zhou Yamin; Zhu Songsong	Indonesia; Wina Apriani; Sarce Aronggear; Dayumin; Astri Dwijayanti; Yulanda Ester Entong; Farida; Raudani Fitra; Fitri Ayu; Hasnah; Tika Inderiyani; Yunita Kadop; Masripah; Minawati; Novita Sari; Ririn Nurparida; Cici Pramita; Riska Elpia Ramadani; Royani Rais; Rasima; Salwiah; Kanti Santyawati; Suhartati; Wahyuni; Since Litashova Yom	Thailand; Chariyarat Ananchai; Sairawee Boonplong; Nattakant Boonruang; Woraporn Boonyuhong; Jaruwan Chaikan; Kornkaew Chantaniyom; Pet Kawong; Auncharee Khuntathong; Sirinya Klongjaroen; Pemika Metsuwan; Pranchalee Moonkasem; Pratumrat Nakuy; Narissara Namsilee; Nipaporn Nopsri; Tanaporn Panid; Supatra Pholsil; Ngamfah Photha; Pattaya Sangkumma; Ravisara Sungsuwan; Rungpailin Sungsuwan; Kanya Tachuenchit; Chutikan Thanawanutpong; Suporn Thussoongnern; Patcharee Tippayamonton

== Medal table ==
Rank	Nation	Gold	Silver	Bronze	Total
1	Indonesia (INA)	3	3	0	6
2	China (CHN)	3	0	2	5
3	Myanmar (MYA)	0	3	0	3
4	Thailand (THA)	0	0	3	3
5	South Korea (KOR)	0	0	1	1
Totals (5 entries)		6	6	6	18

== Participating nations ==
A total of 407 athletes from 11 nations competed in dragon boat at the 2010 Asian Games:

- China (47)
- Chinese Taipei (24)
- Hong Kong (24)
- Indonesia (48)
- Iran (48)
- Japan (24)
- Macau (48)
- Myanmar (24)
- Singapore (48)
- South Korea (24)
- Thailand (48)
