= Dragon boat at the 2010 Asian Games – Women's 500 metres =

Women's 500 metres at the 2010 Asian Games
- Venue: Zengcheng Dragon Boat Lake
- Date: 19 November 2010
- Competitors: 144 from 6 nations

Medalists
gold medal	China
silver medal	Indonesia
bronze medal	Thailand

The women's 500 metres competition at the 2010 Asian Games in Guangzhou was held on 19 November 2010 at the Zengcheng Dragon Boat Lake.

== Schedule ==
All times are China Standard Time (UTC+08:00)

Date	Time	Event
Friday, 19 November 2010	09:20	Heats
Friday, 19 November 2010	10:10	Repechage
Friday, 19 November 2010	11:00	Finals

== Squads ==
China	Indonesia	Iran	Macau
Cao Lina; Chen Lulu; Cong Linlin; Huang Yi; Li Jiadai; Li Yuanyuan; Liang Liping; Liang Zhuanhao; Liang Ziyu; Liu Jia; Liu Xuelian; Lun Jinyi; Luo Xin; Peng Chun; Qu Xue; Song Yanbing; Wang Lin; Wu Yongfang; Xia Shiying; Yu Zhanxin; Zhang Guolong; Zhao Yanna; Zhou Yamin; Zhu Songsong	Wina Apriani; Sarce Aronggear; Dayumin; Astri Dwijayanti; Yulanda Ester Entong; Farida; Raudani Fitra; Fitri Ayu; Hasnah; Tika Inderiyani; Yunita Kadop; Masripah; Minawati; Novita Sari; Ririn Nurparida; Cici Pramita; Riska Elpia Ramadani; Royani Rais; Rasima; Salwiah; Kanti Santyawati; Suhartati; Wahyuni; Since Litashova Yom	Kobra Absalan; Fereshteh Ahmadi; Behnoush Akaberi; Diana Amini; Mitra Azizi; Mitra Barzegar; Azam Daneshvar; Yasaman Darparnian; Sahar Hefzi; Kimia Mahdaviani; Zahra Mirakhori; Samaneh Mohagheghian; Fatemeh Moradkhani; Niloufar Mousavi; Homa Najibi; Banafsheh Rahgozar; Sheida Ramezani; Mehraneh Sayyad; Sogand Sedighi; Neda Taheri; Fatemeh Tat-Hesari; Sara Zainali; Fariba Zare; Mahnaz Zare	Chan Hoi Man; Chan Iong Mui; Chan Ip Mui; Chan On Na; Chan Wai Fong; Chao Sio Kam; Cheok Sio Leng; Chong Lai Kuan; Fong Hong Ieng; Sofia Ip; Kou Lei Chi; Kuok Lai Ieng; Lei Weng I; Leong Choi Wan; Leong Hou Lam; Leong Kam In; Racy Leong; Lok Oi Kan; Pang Tsz Shan; Sam I Wa; Sin Kuan Mui; Wong Ka Loi; Wong Lai Peng; Wu Wing Yan
Singapore	Thailand		
Bai Yi Rang; Jennifer Chen; Chiam Li Ping; Sarah Ching; Chyan Shiang Chi; Pamela Ee; Ho Chia Ing; Kwah Rika; Lau Khing Hui; Elise Lee; Loh Ying; Diana Nai; Neo Lay Peng; Ng Ji Yan; Ng Qihui; Ng Ting Yi; Nurul Hakin Rohaizat; Joan Poh; Poon Shing Ping; Seah Beng Choo; Siti Norwani Hussain; Tan Si Min; Grace Tang; Samantha Tham	Chariyarat Ananchai; Sairawee Boonplong; Nattakant Boonruang; Woraporn Boonyuhong; Jaruwan Chaikan; Kornkaew Chantaniyom; Pet Kawong; Auncharee Khuntathong; Sirinya Klongjaroen; Pemika Metsuwan; Pranchalee Moonkasem; Pratumrat Nakuy; Narissara Namsilee; Nipaporn Nopsri; Tanaporn Panid; Supatra Pholsil; Ngamfah Photha; Pattaya Sangkumma; Ravisara Sungsuwan; Rungpailin Sungsuwan; Kanya Tachuenchit; Chutikan Thanawanutpong; Suporn Thussoongnern; Patcharee Tippayamonton		

== Results ==
=== Heats ===
- Qualification: 1 → Grand final (GF), Rest → Repechage (R)

==== Heat 1 ====
Rank	Team	Time	Notes
1	China	2:00.430	GF
2	Indonesia	2:01.600	R
3	Macau	2:09.406	R

==== Heat 2 ====
Rank	Team	Time	Notes
1	Thailand	2:04.233	GF
2	Iran	2:09.345	R
3	Singapore	2:09.729	R

=== Repechage ===
- Qualification: 1 → Grand final (GF), Rest → Minnor final (MF)

Rank	Team	Time	Notes
1	Indonesia	2:07.321	GF
2	Macau	2:08.203	MF
3	Iran	2:12.601	MF
4	Singapore	2:14.827	MF

=== Finals ===
==== Minor final ====
Rank	Team	Time
1	Singapore	2:11.832
2	Macau	2:14.988
3	Iran	2:15.258

==== Grand final ====
Rank	Team	Time
1st place, gold medalist(s)	China	2:00.667
2nd place, silver medalist(s)	Indonesia	2:02.875
3rd place, bronze medalist(s)	Thailand	2:06.271
