= Sarce Aronggear =

Indonesian canoeist (born 1979)

Personal information
- Born: 7 July 1979 (age 46) Yapen Islands Regency, Papua, Indonesia

Sport
- Country: Indonesia
- Sport: canoeing & dragon boat
Medal record
Women's canoeing
Representing Indonesia
Asian Championships
Bronze medal – third place	2007 Hwacheon	K-4 200 m
SEA Games
Gold medal – first place	2005 Manila	K-1 500 m
Gold medal – first place	2005 Manila	K-2 500 m
Gold medal – first place	2007 Nakhon Ratchasima	K-1 500 m
Gold medal – first place	2007 Nakhon Ratchasima	K-4 500 m
Gold medal – first place	2011 Jakarta–Palembang	K-4 200 m
Gold medal – first place	2011 Jakarta–Palembang	K-4 500 m
Silver medal – second place	2007 Nakhon Ratchasima	K-2 500 m
Women's dragon boat
Asian Games
Silver medal – second place	2010 Guangzhou	250 m
Silver medal – second place	2010 Guangzhou	500 m
Silver medal – second place	2010 Guangzhou	1000 m
Asian Beach Games
Gold medal – first place	2008 Bali	250 m
Gold medal – first place	2008 Bali	500 m
Gold medal – first place	2008 Bali	1000 m

Sarce Aronggear (born July 7, 1979) is an Indonesian sprint canoer who competed in the mid-2000s. At the 2004 Summer Olympics in Athens, she was eliminated in the heats of the K-1 500 m event.
