= Thailand at the 2010 Asian Games =

- IOC code: THA
- NOC: National Olympic Committee of Thailand
- Website: www.olympicthai.or.th/eng (in English and Thai)

in Guangzhou
- Competitors: 593 in 39 sports
- Flag bearers: Danai Udomchoke (opening); Suebsak Phunsueb (closing)
- Medals Ranked 9th: Gold 11 Silver 9 Bronze 32 Total 52

Asian Games appearances (overview)
- 1951; 1954; 1958; 1962; 1966; 1970; 1974; 1978; 1982; 1986; 1990; 1994; 1998; 2002; 2006; 2010; 2014; 2018; 2022; 2026

Thailand participated in the 2010 Asian Games in Guangzhou, China between 12–27 November 2010. The National Olympic Committee of Thailand sent 593 athletes to Guangzhou (280 men and 313 women), and competed in 39 out of 42 sports. Thailand ended the games at 52 overall medals including 11 gold medals. These games witnessed first ever gold medals in Taekwondo.

== Medal summary ==
=== Medals by sport ===
Sport	Gold	Silver	Bronze	Total
Sepaktakraw	4	0	0	4
Sailing	3	1	2	6
Taekwondo	2	2	4	8
Boxing	1	1	2	4
Athletics	1	0	2	3
Shooting	0	1	4	5
Badminton	0	1	1	2
Weightlifting	0	1	1	2
Equestrian	0	1	0	1
Kabaddi	0	1	0	1
Cue sports	0	0	3	3
Dragon boat	0	0	3	3
Cycling	0	0	2	2
Karate	0	0	2	2
Tennis	0	0	2	2
Rowing	0	0	1	1
Rugby	0	0	1	1
Volleyball	0	0	1	1
Wushu	0	0	1	1
Total	11	9	32	52

=== Medalists ===
The following Thai competitors won medals at the games; all dates are for November 2010.

Medal	Name	Sport	Event	Date
Gold	Sarita Phongsri	Taekwondo	Women's –53 kg	18
Gold	Damrongsak Vongtim; Kitsada Vongtim	Sailing	Open Hobie–16	20
Gold	Keerati Bualong	Sailing	Open Laser Radial	20
Gold	Noppakao Poonpat	Sailing	Women's Dinghy Optimist	20
Gold	Thai men's national sepaktakraw team: Kritsana Tanakorn; Suriyan Peachan; Suebsak Phunsueb; Somporn Jaisinghol; Pornchai Kaokaew; Anuwat Chaichana; Kriangkrai Kaewmian; Singha Somsakul; Supachai Maneenat; Pattarapong Yupadee; Siriwat Sakha; Wirawut Na Nongkhai	Sepaktakraw	Men's Team	20
Gold	Thai women's national sepaktakraw team: Tidawan Daosakul; Nareerat Takan; Sunthari Rupsung; Wanwisa Jankaen; Phikun Seedam; Nisa Thanaattawut; Daranee Wongcharern; Payom Srihongsa; Nitinadda Kaewkamsai; Kaewjai Pumsawangkaew; Rungtip Tanaking; Masaya Duangsri	Sepaktakraw	Women's Team	20
Gold	Chutchawal Khawlaor	Taekwondo	Men's –54 kg	20
Gold	Pornchai Kaokaew; Anuwat Chaichana; Kriangkrai Kaewmian; Pattarapong Yupadee; Wirawut Na Nongkhai	Sepaktakraw	Men's Regu	24
Gold	Tidawan Daosakul; Sunthari Rupsung; Daranee Wongcharern; Nareerat Takan; Phikun Seedam	Sepaktakraw	Women's Regu	24
Gold	Laphassaporn Tawoncharoen; Phatsorn Jaksuninkorn; Nongnuch Sanrat; Neeranuch Klomdee	Athletics	Women's 4 × 100 m Relay	26
Gold	Worapoj Petchkoom	Boxing	Men's Bantamweight (56 kg)	26
Silver	Pensiri Laosirikul	Weightlifting	Women's 48 kg	13
Silver	Thai women's national badminton team: Savitree Amitrapai; Duanganong Aroonkesorn; Porntip Buranaprasertsuk; Ratchanok Intanon; Nitchaon Jindapol; Salakjit Ponsana; Punyada Munkitchokecharoen; Sapsiree Taerattanachai; Saralee Thoungthongkam; Kunchala Voravichitchaikul	Badminton	Women's Team	15
Silver	Vitchuda Pichitkanjanakul; Ratchadaporn Plengsaengthong; Supamas Wankaew	Shooting	Women's 50 m Rifle Prone Team	15
Silver	Nacha Punthong	Taekwondo	Men's –63 kg	19
Silver	Terri Impson; Promton Kingwan; Nina Ligon; Weerawat Pitakanonda	Equestrian	Eventing Team	20
Silver	Ek Boonsawad	Sailing	Men's RS:X	20
Silver	Pen-Ek Karaket	Taekwondo	Men's –58 kg	20
Silver	Thai women's national kabaddi team: Chonlada Chaiprapan; Wattakan Kammachot; Namfon Kangkeeree; Naleerat Ketsaro; Alisa Limsamran; Nuchanart Maiwan; Yaowaret Nitsara; Janjira Panprasert; Atchara Puangngern; Kamontip Suwanchana; Satarut Thonghun; Treeveeraporn Tongnun	Kabaddi	Women's	26
Silver	Tassamalee Thongjan	Boxing	Women's Lightweight (60 kg)	26
Bronze	Thai men's national badminton team: Boonsak Ponsana; Sudket Prapakamol; Songphon Anugritayawon; Suppanyu Avihingsanon; Pollawat Boonpan; Bodin Isara; Maneepong Jongjit; Thitipong Lapho; Tanongsak Saensomboonsuk; Pakkawat Vilailak	Badminton	Men's Team	14
Bronze	Suweenut Muangin; Nicha Pathom-Ekmongkhon; Maliwan Sangklha	Cue Sports	Women's Six–Red Snooker Team	14
Bronze	Prapawadee Jaroenrattanatarakoon	Weightlifting	Women's 53 kg	14
Bronze	Noppadon Noppachorn; Ratchapol Pu-Ob-Orm; Thepchaiya Un-Nooh	Cue Sports	Men's Snooker Team	15
Bronze	Noppawan Lertcheewakarn; Nudnida Luangnam; Tamarine Tanasugarn; Varatchaya Wongteanchai	Tennis	Women's Team	15
Bronze	Chanpeng Nontasin	Cycling	Women's Points Race	16
Bronze	Patiwat Thongsalup	Taekwondo	Men's –74 kg	17
Bronze	Chanapa Sonkham	Taekwondo	Women's –49 kg	17
Bronze	Khwanyuen Chanthra	Wushu	Men's Sanshou 56 kg	17
Bronze	Thai women's national dragon boat team	Dragon Boat	Women's 1000 m Straight Race	18
Bronze	Thai women's national dragon boat team	Dragon Boat	Women's 500 m Straight Race	19
Bronze	Bussayamas Phaengkathok	Rowing	Women's Lightweight Single Sculls	19
Bronze	Dhunyanun Premwhaew	Taekwondo	Women's –62 kg	19
Bronze	Dechawat Poomjaeng	Cue Sports	Men's Snooker Single	20
Bronze	Chanpeng Nontasin	Cycling	Women's Individual Time Trial	20
Bronze	Thai women's national dragon boat team	Dragon Boat	Women's 250 m Straight Race	20
Bronze	Napalai Tansai	Sailing	Women's Mistral	20
Bronze	Sarocha Prumprai	Sailing	Women's RS:X	20
Bronze	Rapatkor Prasopsuk	Taekwondo	Women's –73 kg	20
Bronze	Janejira Srisongkram	Shooting	Women's Double Trap	21
Bronze	Punnapa Asvanit; Chattaya Kitcaroen; Janejira Srisongkram	Shooting	Women's Double Trap Team	21
Bronze	Tamarine Tanasugarn; Sanchai Ratiwatana	Tennis	Mixed Doubles	21
Bronze	Thailand's women national rugby team: Naritsara Worakitsirikun; Prima Jusom; Tidarat Sawatnam; Aoychai Tummawat; Rungrat Maineiwklang; Piyamat Chomphumee; Chitchanok Yusri; Rasamee Sisongkham; Uthumporn Liemrat; Butsaya Bunrak; P Wongwangchan; Jeeraporn Peerabunanon	Rugby	Women's	23
Bronze	Sutiya Jiewchaloemmit	Shooting	Women's Skeet	23
Bronze	Isarapa Imprasertsuk; Sutiya Jiewchaloemmit; Nutchaya Sut-Arporn	Shooting	Women's Skeet Team	23
Bronze	Usa Tenpaksee; Jarunee Sannok	Volleyball	Women's Beach Volleyball	23
Bronze	Amnat Ruenroeng	Boxing	Men's Light Flyweight (49 kg)	24
Bronze	Wuttichai Masuk	Boxing	Men's Light Welterweight (64 kg)	24
Bronze	Saratham Hirannithishatphol	Karate	Men's –55 kg	24
Bronze	Yanisa Torrattanawathana	Karate	Women's –50 kg	24
Bronze	Thitima Muangjan	Athletics	Women's Triple Jump	25
Bronze	Wachara Sorndee; Sittichai Suwonprateep; Sompote Suwannarangsri; Taweesak Pooltong	Athletics	Men's 4 × 100 m Relay	26

Medals by date
Day	Date	Gold medal	Silver medal	Bronze medal	Total
Day 1	13th	0	1	0	2
Day 2	14th	0	0	3	3
Day 3	15th	0	2	2	4
Day 4	16th	0	0	1	1
Day 5	17th	0	0	3	3
Day 6	18th	1	0	1	2
Day 7	19th	0	1	3	4
Day 8	20th	6	3	6	15
Day 9	21st	0	0	3	3
Day 10	22nd	0	0	0	0
Day 11	23rd	0	0	4	4
Day 12	24th	2	0	4	6
Day 13	25th	0	0	1	1
Day 14	26th	2	2	1	5
Day 15	27th	0	0	0	0
Total		11	9	32	52

== Aquatics ==
=== Swimming ===
Men

Athlete	Event	Heats		Final	
Athlete	Event	Time	Rank	Time	Rank
Nuttapong Ketin	100 m breaststroke	1:04.34	4	Did not advance	
Nuttapong Ketin	200 m breaststroke	2:16.15	3 Q	2:17.79	7
Nuttapong Ketin	200 m individual medley	2:05.06	2 Q	2:05.14	8
Nuttapong Ketin	400 m individual medley	4:27.94	3 Q	4:25.62	6
Punyawee Sontana	200 m freestyle	1:58.73	8	Did not advance	
Punyawee Sontana	400 m freestyle	4:10.80	6	Did not advance	
Punyawee Sontana	1500 m freestyle			16:26.21	8
Sarit Tiewong	100 m freestyle	53.14	4	Did not advance	
Sarit Tiewong	200 m freestyle	1:53.33	4	Did not advance	
Sarit Tiewong	400 m freestyle	4:00.49	2 Q	4:03.59	8
Vorrawuti Aumpiwan	50 m breaststroke	29.36	5	Did not advance	
Vorrawuti Aumpiwan	100 m breaststroke	1:04.77	5	Did not advance	
Arwut Chinnapasaen	50 m freestyle	23.58	4	Did not advance	

Women

Athlete	Event	Heats		Final	
Athlete	Event	Time	Rank	Time	Rank
Natthanan Junkrajang	50 m freestyle	26.41	4	Did not advance	
Natthanan Junkrajang	100 m freestyle	57.21	2 Q	57.14	7
Natthanan Junkrajang	200 m freestyle	2:03.20	3 Q	2:05.35	8
Natthanan Junkrajang	50 m backstroke	31.66	4	Did not advance	
Natthanan Junkrajang	200 m individual medley	2:19.83	5 Q	2:19.22	8
Rutai Santadvatana	200 m freestyle	2:06.72	5	Did not advance	
Rutai Santadvatana	400 m freestyle	4:20.61	3 Q	4:21.01	6
Rutai Santadvatana	800m freestyle			8:55.93	5
Patarawadee Kittiya	100 m butterfly	1:03.54	6	Did not advance	
Patarawadee Kittiya	200 m butterfly	2:15.39	4 Q	2:15.40	8
Patarawadee Kittiya	400 m individual medley	4:58.93	4 Q	4:57.44	8
Natnapa Prommuenwai	50 m butterfly	29.00	4	Did not advance	
Natnapa Prommuenwai	100 m butterfly	1:03.33	6	Did not advance	
Phiangkhwan Pawapotako	50 m breaststroke	34.08	4	Did not advance	
Phiangkhwan Pawapotako	100 m breaststroke	1:14.27	5	Did not advance	
Phiangkhwan Pawapotako	200 m breaststroke	2:39.29	8	Did not advance	
Chavunnooch Salubluek	50 m breaststroke	34.41	5	Did not advance	
Chavunnooch Salubluek	100 m breaststroke	1:14.43	5	Did not advance	
Chavunnooch Salubluek	200 m breaststroke	2:37.56	5 Q	2:37.86	8
Chav Thaveesupsoonthorn	100 m backstroke	1:09.08	6	Did not advance	
Chav Thaveesupsoonthorn	200 m backstroke	2:23.14	6	Did not advance	
Benjaporn Sriphanomthorn	400 m freestyle	4:23.55	5	Did not advance	
Benjaporn Sriphanomthorn	800 m freestyle	8:52.94	2	Did not advance	
Natsaya Susuk	50 m freestyle	26.66	4	Did not advance	
Natsaya Susuk	100 m freestyle	57.57	4 Q	57.27	8
Natsaya Susuk	50 m butterfly	28.42	4	Did not advance	
Chawiwan Khammee	200 m individual medley	2:30.65	7	Did not advance	
Natthanan Junkrajang; Chawiwan Khammee; Benjaporn Sriphanomthorn; Natsaya Susuk	4 × 100 m freestyle relay			3:51.66	6
Natthanan Junkrajang; Patarawadee Kittiya; Rutai Santadvatana; Benjaporn Sriphanomthorn	4 × 200 m freestyle relay			8:18.57	6
Natthanan Junkrajang; Natnapa Prommuenwai; Chavunnooch Salubluek; Chav. Thaveesupsoonthorn	4 × 100 m medley relay			4:22.85	6

=== Synchronized swimming ===
Athlete	Event	Technical routine		Free routine		Total Points	Rank
Athlete	Event	Points	Rank	Points	Rank	Total Points	Rank
Nantaya Polsen; Natchanat Krasachol; Arthittaya Kittithanatphum	Duet	71.875	7	73.625	7	145.500	7
Thinattha Kanchanakanti; Arthittaya Kittithanatphum; Natchanat Krasachol; Nantaya Polsen; Thanyaluck Puttisiriroj; Chanamon Sangakul; Busarin Tanabutchot; Nujarin Tanabutchot; Manisorn Tritipetsuwan; Ravisara Vathagavorakul	Team	68.500	4	71.625	4	140.125	4
Thinattha Kanchanakanti; Arthittaya Kittithanatphum; Natchanat Krasachol; Nantaya Polsen; Thanyaluck Puttisiriroj; Chanamon Sangakul; Busarin Tanabutchot; Nujarin Tanabutchot; Manisorn Tritipetsuwan; Ravisara Vathagavorakul	Combination					70.250	5

== Archery ==
Men

Athlete	Event	Qualification Round		Round of 64	Round of 32	Round of 16	Quarterfinals	Semifinals	Final	
Athlete	Event	Score	Seed	Opposition Score	Opposition Score	Opposition Score	Opposition Score	Opposition Score	Opposition Score	Rank
Khomkrit Duangsuwan	Individual	1287	29 Q		Riyazimehr (IRI); L 0 – 4	Did not advance				
Witthaya Thamwong	Individual	1300	25 Q		Jantsan (MGL); L 1 – 5	Did not advance				
Denchai Thepna	Individual	1261	41	Did not advance						
Wachiranarong Tinrasri	Individual	1238	46	Did not advance						
Khomkrit Duangsuwan; Witthaya Thamwong; Denchai Thepna	Team	3848	9 Q			Mongolia; W 214 – 212	South Korea; L 208 – 229	Did not advance		

Women

Athlete	Event	Qualification Round		Round of 64	Round of 32	Round of 16	Quarterfinals	Semifinals	Final	
Athlete	Event	Score	Seed	Opposition Score	Opposition Score	Opposition Score	Opposition Score	Opposition Score	Opposition Score	Rank
Narisara Tinbua	Individual	1293	21 Q		Nguyen (VIE); L 2 – 4	did not advance				

== Badminton ==
Men

Athlete	Event	Round of 32	Round of 16	Quarterfinals	Semifinals	Final	
Athlete	Event	Opposition Score	Opposition Score	Opposition Score	Opposition Score	Opposition Score	Rank
Boonsak Ponsana	Singles	Chan (MAC); W 2 – 0	Bhat (IND); W 2 – 0	Lee (MAS); L 0 – 2	did not advance		
Tanongsak Saensomboonsuk	Singles	Purevsuren (MGL); W 2 – 0	Nguyen (VIE); L 0 – 2	Did not advance			
Sudket Prapakamol; Songphon Anugritayawon	Doubles	Olonbayar – Purevsuren (MGL); W 2 – 0	Guo – Xu (CHN); L 0 – 2	Did not advance			
Bodin Isara; Maneepong Jongjit	Doubles	Enkhold – Munkhbaatar (MGL); W 2 – 0	Chen – Lin (TPE); L 0 – 2	Did not advance			
Boonsak Ponsana; Sudket Prapakamol; Songphon Anugritayawon; S Avihingsanon; Pollawat Boonpan; Bodin Isara; Maneepong Jongjit; Thitipong Lapho; Tanongsak Saensomboonsuk; Pakkawat Vilailak	Team		Bye	Malaysia; W 3 – 2	South Korea; L 1 – 3	N/A	3rd place, bronze medalist(s)

Women

Athlete	Event	Round of 32	Round of 16	Quarterfinals	Semifinals	Final	
Athlete	Event	Opposition Score	Opposition Score	Opposition Score	Opposition Score	Opposition Score	Rank
Salakjit Ponsana	Singles	Adrianti (INA); L 2 – 1	Did not advance				
Porntip Buranaprasertsuk	Singles	Shrestha (NEP); W 2 – 0	Wang (CHN); L 1 – 2	Did not advance			
Duanganong Aroonkesorn; Kunchala Voravichitchaikul	Doubles	Dahanayake – Jayasinghe (SRI); W 2 – 0	Maeda – Suetsuna (JPN); L 0 – 2	Did not advance			
Savitree Amitrapai; Punyada Munkitchokecharoen	Doubles	Gutta – Ponnappa (IND); L 0 – 1 (Retired)	Did not advance				
Savitree Amitrapai; Duanganong Aroonkesorn; Porntip Buranaprasertsuk; Ratchanok Intanon; Nitchaon Jindapol; Punyada Munkitchokecharoen; Salakjit Ponsana; Sapsiree Taerattanachai; Saralee Thoungthongkam; Kunchala Voravichitchaikul	Team		Bye	Japan; W 3 – 1	Indonesia; W 3 – 1	China; L 0 – 3	2nd place, silver medalist(s)

== Baseball ==
Preliminary – Group A

Pos	Team	Pld	W	L	RF	RA	PCT	GB	Qualification
1	Japan	3	3	0	45	0	1.000	—	Semifinals
2	China	3	2	1	22	3	.667	1	Semifinals
3	Thailand	3	1	2	25	25	.333	2	
4	Mongolia	3	0	3	0	64	.000	3	

Source: Results

November 13, 2010 — 12:00

Team	1	2	3	4	5	6	7	8	9	R	H	E
Thailand	0	0	0	0	0	-	-	-	-	0	0	0
Japan	10	5	3	0	x	-	-	-	-	18	20	0
Starting pitchers: Away: Kamolphan Kanjanavisutk; Home: Kota Suda; WP: Takashi Fujita LP: Kamolphan Kanjanavisut

November 15, 2010 — 13:00

Team	1	2	3	4	5	6	7	8	9	R	H	E
Mongolia	0	0	0	0	0	-	-	-	-	0	2	4
Thailand	1	5	4	15	x	-	-	-	-	25	20	1
Starting pitchers: Away: Munkhsaikhan Chultem; Home: Kamolphan Kanjanavisut; WP: Siraphop Nadee LP: Munkhsaikhan Chultem

November 16, 2010 — 18:00

Team	1	2	3	4	5	6	7	8	9	R	H	E
Thailand	0	0	0	0	0	0	0	0	0	0	5	1
China	0	2	3	2	0	0	0	0	x	7	12	0
Starting pitchers: Away: Nattapong Meeboonrod; Home: Bu Tao; WP: Bu Tao LP: Nattapong Meeboonrod

Semifinals – Did not advance

== Basketball ==
Women

Preliminary – Group A

Rank	Team	Matches			Points			Pts
Rank	Team	Pld	W	L	PF	PA	PD	Pts
1	China	3	3	0	277	146	+131	6
2	South Korea	3	2	1	255	171	+84	5
3	Thailand	3	1	2	160	245	−85	4
4	India	3	0	3	139	267	−128	3

November 18, 2010
19:15

South Korea	93–55	Thailand
Scoring by quarter: 31–10, 15–13, 26–16, 21–16

Ying Dong Gymnasium, Ying Dong

November 20, 2010
19:15

China	98–43	Thailand
Scoring by quarter: 29–9, 27–18, 22–10, 20–6

Huangpu Gymnasium, Huangpu

November 22, 2010
14:15

India	54–62	Thailand
Scoring by quarter: 17–14, 3–22, 27–12, 7–14

Ying Dong Gymnasium, Ying Dong

5th Place Match

November 24, 2010
14:15

Thailand	93–47	Maldives
Scoring by quarter: 23–11, 25–12, 19–12, 26–12

Guangzhou Sports Arena, Guangzhou

Final Rank – 5th

== Cricket ==
Women

Preliminary – Pool C

November 14, 2010
09:30
scorecard

Pakistan; 50/2 (8.3 Overs)	v	Thailand; 49/10 (19.3 Overs)
Nida Rashid 21* (18); 4/1 SAISUD Thanapan (1.3 overs)		KOSATHONG Siwaporn 10 (37); 8/4 Gulzar Sana (4 overs)

Pakistan won by 8 Wickets.
Guangdong International Cricket Stadium, Guangdong
Umpires: VISWANAOAN Kalidas (Mas), PRADHAN Buddhi Bahadur (Nep)

- Thailand won the toss and elected to bat first

Preliminary – Pool G

November 16, 2010
09:30
scorecard

Thailand; 94/8 (20 overs)	v	Malaysia; 63 all out (16.2 overs)
Natthakan Chantam 19 (18); Alessandra Shunmugan 14/3 (4 overs)		Emylia Eliani 19 (30); Nattaya Boochatham 7/4 (3 overs)

Thailand won by 31 runs
Guangdong International Cricket Stadium, Guangdong
Umpires: Sun Jianxin (Chi) and Mosur Ramesh (Sin)

- Thailand won the toss and elected to bat first

Quarterfinals

November 17, 2010
09:30
scorecard

China; 93/6 (20 overs)	v	Thailand; 92/6 (20 overs)
Sun Huan 37 (47); Natthakan Chantham 11/2 (4 overs)		Pundarika Prathanmitr 46 (53); Yu Miao 10/2 (2 overs)

China won by 1 run
Guangdong International Cricket Stadium, Guangdong
Umpires: M Ramesh (Sin) and N Sivanandan (Mas)

- China won the toss and elected to bat

Semifinals – Did not advance

== Dragon boat ==
Men

Athlete	Event	Heat		Repechage		Final	
Athlete	Event	Time	Rank	Time	Rank	Time	Rank
Surachai Anun; Winai Arino; Suriya Butnongwa; Paiboon Chankram; Suthumarat Chengcharoen; Chaiyakarn Choochuen; Manit Haisok; Santas Mingwongyang; Thunyaboon Nasok; Thotsaporm Pholseth; Samart Pimharn; Amnat Pinthong; Anuchit Promdongkloy; Montean Pudchakieo; Yutthapong Ruangjan; Winya Seechomchuen; Somsong Suebsingkarn; Gunyakorn Tawa; Jakkapong Thomjoho; Chayun Tuejaimai; Bamrung Udompan; Ekkapong Wongunjai; Wuttikrai Wongguppari; Piyapong Wutti	250 m	51.537	3	52.205	1 Q	50.379	4
Surachai Anun; Winai Arino; Suriya Butnongwa; Paiboon Chankram; Suthumarat Chengcharoen; Chaiyakarn Choochuen; Manit Haisok; Santas Mingwongyang; Thunyaboon Nasok; Thotsaporm Pholseth; Samart Pimharn; Amnat Pinthong; Anuchit Promdongkloy; Montean Pudchakieo; Yutthapong Ruangjan; Winya Seechomchuen; Somsong Suebsingkarn; Gunyakorn Tawa; Jakkapong Thomjoho; Chayun Tuejaimai; Bamrung Udompan; Ekkapong Wongunjai; Wuttikrai Wongguppari; Piyapong Wutti	500 m	1:48.493	3	1:47.883	2 Q	1:51.040	6
Surachai Anun; Winai Arino; Suriya Butnongwa; Paiboon Chankram; Suthumarat Chengcharoen; Chaiyakarn Choochuen; Manit Haisok; Santas Mingwongyang; Thunyaboon Nasok; Thotsaporm Pholseth; Samart Pimharn; Amnat Pinthong; Anuchit Promdongkloy; Montean Pudchakieo; Yutthapong Ruangjan; Winya Seechomchuen; Somsong Suebsingkarn; Gunyakorn Tawa; Jakkapong Thomjoho; Chayun Tuejaimai; Bamrung Udompan; Ekkapong Wongunjai; Wuttikrai Wongguppari; Piyapong Wutti	1000 m	3:46.482	3	3:42.936	3	3:49.392	7

Women

Athlete	Event	Heat		Repechage		Final	
Athlete	Event	Time	Rank	Time	Rank	Time	Rank
Chariyarat Ananchai; Sairawee Boonplong; Nattakant Boonruang; Woraporn Boonyuhong; Jaruwan Chaikan; Kornkaew Chantaniyom; Pet Kawong; Auncharee Khuntathong; Sirinya Klongjaroen; Pemika Metsuwan; Pranchalee Moonkasem; Pratumrat Nakuy; Narissara Namsilee; Nipaporn Nopsri; Tanaporn Panid; Supatra Pholsil; Ngamfah Photha; Pattaya Sangkumma; Ravisara Sungsuwan; Rungpailin Sungsuwan; Kanya Tachuenchit; Chutikan Thanawanutpong; Suporn Thussoongnern; Patcharee Tippayamonton	250 m	1:01.886	1 Q			1:02.008	3rd place, bronze medalist(s)
Chariyarat Ananchai; Sairawee Boonplong; Nattakant Boonruang; Woraporn Boonyuhong; Jaruwan Chaikan; Kornkaew Chantaniyom; Pet Kawong; Auncharee Khuntathong; Sirinya Klongjaroen; Pemika Metsuwan; Pranchalee Moonkasem; Pratumrat Nakuy; Narissara Namsilee; Nipaporn Nopsri; Tanaporn Panid; Supatra Pholsil; Ngamfah Photha; Pattaya Sangkumma; Ravisara Sungsuwan; Rungpailin Sungsuwan; Kanya Tachuenchit; Chutikan Thanawanutpong; Suporn Thussoongnern; Patcharee Tippayamonton	500 m	2:04.233	1 Q			2:06.271	3rd place, bronze medalist(s)
Chariyarat Ananchai; Sairawee Boonplong; Nattakant Boonruang; Woraporn Boonyuhong; Jaruwan Chaikan; Kornkaew Chantaniyom; Pet Kawong; Auncharee Khuntathong; Sirinya Klongjaroen; Pemika Metsuwan; Pranchalee Moonkasem; Pratumrat Nakuy; Narissara Namsilee; Nipaporn Nopsri; Tanaporn Panid; Supatra Pholsil; Ngamfah Photha; Pattaya Sangkumma; Ravisara Sungsuwan; Rungpailin Sungsuwan; Kanya Tachuenchit; Chutikan Thanawanutpong; Suporn Thussoongnern; Patcharee Tippayamonton	1000 m	4:17.976	1 Q			4:18.292	3rd place, bronze medalist(s)

== Football ==
=== Men ===
Pos	Team	Pld	W	D	L	GF	GA	GD	Pts
1	Oman	3	2	1	0	6	1	+5	7
2	Thailand	3	1	2	0	7	1	+6	5
3	Maldives	3	0	2	1	0	3	−3	2
4	Pakistan	3	0	1	2	0	8	−8	1

Source: RSSSF
November 7, 2010
19:00

Thailand	6 – 0	Pakistan
Thonglao 15', 29'; Dangda 16', 73'; Keawsombat 59'; Jujeen 65'	Report

Huangpu Sports Center, Guangzhou
Referee: Ali Sabbagh (Lebanon)

November 9, 2010
16:00

Thailand	1 – 1	Oman
Al-Shatri 44' (o.g.)	Report	Al-Mukhaini 45+1'

Guangdong People's Stadium, Guangzhou
Referee: Mohammed Zarouni (United Arab Emirates)

November 11, 2010
19:00

Thailand	0 – 0	Maldives
	Report

Huangpu Sports Center, Guangzhou
Referee: Banjar Al-Dosari (Qatar)

Round of 16

November 16, 2010
19:00

Turkmenistan	0 – 1 (a.e.t.)	Thailand
	Report	Keerathi 107'

Yuexiushan Stadium, Guangzhou
Referee: Ali Sabbagh (Lebanon)

Quarterfinals

November 19, 2010
15:30

Japan	1 – 0	Thailand
Higashi 45'	Report

Huangpu Sports Center, Guangzhou
Referee: Valentin Kovalenko (Uzbekistan)

Semifinals – Did not advance

=== Women ===
Pos	Team	Pld	W	D	L	GF	GA	GD	Pts
1	Japan	2	1	1	0	4	0	+4	4
2	North Korea	2	1	1	0	2	0	+2	4
3	Thailand	2	0	0	2	0	6	−6	0

Source: RSSSF
November 14, 2010
19:00

Thailand	0 – 4	Japan
	Report	Kitamoto 24'; Ohno 35'; Sakaguchi 60'; Wiwasukhu 86' (o.g.)

Huangpu Sports Center, Guangzhou
Referee: Hong Eun-Ah (Korea Republic)

November 16, 2010
19:00

Thailand	0 – 2	North Korea
	Report	Jong Pok-Sim 34' (pen.); Ra Un-Sim 58'

Huangpu Sports Center, Guangzhou
Referee: Mai Hoang Trang (Vietnam)

Semifinals – Did not advance

== Golf ==
Men

Event	Athlete	R1	R2	R3	R4	Total	Par	Rank
Individual	Atthachai Jaichalad	73	73	65	74	285	–3	4
Individual	Wasin Sripattranusorn	75	69	72	73	289	+1	8
Individual	Poom Saksansin	78	73	75	75	301	+13	27
Team	Atthachai Jaichalad; Wasin Sripattranusorn; Poom Saksansin	226	215	212	222	875	+11	4

Women

Event	Athlete	R1	R2	R3	R4	Total	Par	Rank
Individual	Ariya Jutanugarn	75	73	74	67	289	+1	4
Individual	Thidapa Suwannapura	77	74	75	72	298	+1	12
Individual	Jaruporn Palakawong	79	76	74	76	305	+17	16
Team	Ariya Jutanugarn; Thidapa Suwannapura; Jaruporn Palakawong	152	147	148	139	586	+10	4

== Handball ==
=== Women ===
Pos	Team	Pld	W	D	L	GF	GA	GD	Pts	Qualification
1	South Korea	4	4	0	0	145	65	+80	8	Semifinals
2	Kazakhstan	4	3	0	1	115	71	+44	6	Semifinals
3	Chinese Taipei	4	2	0	2	116	98	+18	4	Placement 5th–6th
4	Thailand	4	1	0	3	78	108	−30	2	Placement 7th–8th
5	Qatar	4	0	0	4	49	161	−112	0	

Source: Results

November 18, 2010; 19:00	South Korea	38 – 17	Thailand	Guanggong Gymnasium, Guangzhou; Referees: Liu, Liu (CHN)
November 18, 2010; 19:00	Woo S.H. 6	(20–7)	Thanawat 9	Guanggong Gymnasium, Guangzhou; Referees: Liu, Liu (CHN)
November 18, 2010; 19:00	3× (yellow card) 3× (suspension)	Report	3× (yellow card) 2× (suspension)	Guanggong Gymnasium, Guangzhou; Referees: Liu, Liu (CHN)

November 19, 2010; 20:45	Kazakhstan	25 – 14	Thailand	Guanggong Gymnasium, Guangzhou; Referees: Mousavian, Taghavi (IRI)
November 19, 2010; 20:45	Zhulkina 5	(16–4)	Phonsen, Suphasanan 4	Guanggong Gymnasium, Guangzhou; Referees: Mousavian, Taghavi (IRI)
November 19, 2010; 20:45	2× (yellow card) 3× (suspension)	Report	4× (yellow card) 5× (suspension)	Guanggong Gymnasium, Guangzhou; Referees: Mousavian, Taghavi (IRI)

November 21, 2010; 19:00	Chinese Taipei	31 – 18	Thailand	Guanggong Gymnasium, Guangzhou; Referees: Al-Marzouqi, Al-Nuaimi (UAE)
November 21, 2010; 19:00	Yang Y.T., Chu C.E. 7	(15–12)	Thanawat 8	Guanggong Gymnasium, Guangzhou; Referees: Al-Marzouqi, Al-Nuaimi (UAE)
November 21, 2010; 19:00	3× (yellow card) 2× (suspension)	Report	3× (yellow card) 3× (suspension) 1× (red card)	Guanggong Gymnasium, Guangzhou; Referees: Al-Marzouqi, Al-Nuaimi (UAE)

November 23, 2010; 17:15	Thailand	29 – 14	Qatar	Guanggong Gymnasium, Guangzhou; Referees: Li, Wang (CHN)
November 23, 2010; 17:15	Thanawat 7	(14–10)	Al-Muhaizaa, Al-Marri, M. Al-Suwaidi 3	Guanggong Gymnasium, Guangzhou; Referees: Li, Wang (CHN)
November 23, 2010; 17:15	4× (yellow card) 3× (suspension)	Report	3× (yellow card) 4× (suspension)	Guanggong Gymnasium, Guangzhou; Referees: Li, Wang (CHN)

7th Place Match

November 25, 2010; 18:00	Thailand	25 – 15	India	Guanggong Gymnasium, Guangzhou; Referees: Li, Wang (CHN)
November 25, 2010; 18:00	Thanawat 8	(9–6)	Patil 5	Guanggong Gymnasium, Guangzhou; Referees: Li, Wang (CHN)
November 25, 2010; 18:00	3× (yellow card) 3× (suspension)	Report	3× (yellow card) 2× (suspension)	Guanggong Gymnasium, Guangzhou; Referees: Li, Wang (CHN)

Final Rank – 7th

== Hockey ==
=== Women's tournament ===
Preliminary round
Pos	Team	Pld	W	D	L	GF	GA	GD	Pts	Qualification
1	China	6	5	1	0	31	4	+27	16	Gold-medal match
2	South Korea	6	5	1	0	24	5	+19	16	Gold-medal match
3	Japan	6	4	0	2	21	7	+14	12	Bronze-medal match
4	India	6	3	0	3	24	6	+18	9	Bronze-medal match
5	Malaysia	6	2	0	4	12	18	−6	6	Fifth-place match
6	Thailand	6	1	0	5	5	44	−39	3	Fifth-place match
7	Kazakhstan	6	0	0	6	3	36	−33	0	

Source: Guangzhou2010
Rules for classification: 1) points; 2) goal difference; 3) goals scored; 4) head-to-head result.

November 13, 2010
17:30

South Korea	5 – 0	Thailand
Kim Eun-Sil 13'; Park Mi-Hyun 40' 66'; Cheon Seul-Ki 54' 68'	Report

Umpires:
Lynn Hassan (SIN)
Christiane Hippler (GER)

November 14, 2010
19:30

China	13 – 0	Thailand
Ma Yibo 4' 11' 43' 47'; Zhao Yudiao 7' 22'; Song Qingling 24' 50'; Gao Lihua 26'; Wang Zhishuang 28'; De Jiaojiao 32'; Xu Xiaoxu 60'; Sun Sinan 63'	Report

Umpires:
Kim Jung-Hee (KOR)
Anupama Puchimanda (IND)

November 17, 2010
18:00

Kazakhstan	0 – 5^{1}	Thailand
Chsherbakova 5' 12' 43'	Report

Umpires:
Kang Hyun-Young (KOR)
Yau Yuen Ki (HKG)

November 19, 2010
13:00

India	13 – 0	Thailand
Thokchom 12'; Anjum 15'; Devi 20' 42' 66'; Pradhan 24' 57'; S. Kaur 28' 31' 60' 63'; Rani 34'; J. Kaur 65'	Report

Umpires:
Lynn Hassan (SIN)
Lesley Nunn (RSA)

November 20, 2010
14:30

Japan	8 – 0	Thailand
Mistsuhashi 20'; Otsuka 32'; Yamamoto 45' 49'; Arai 56'; Murakami 63'; Chiba 68' 69'	Report

Umpires:
Nor Piza Hassan (MAS)
Yau Yuen Ki (HKG)

November 22, 2010
15:30

Malaysia	5 – 0	Thailand
Ruhaini 24'; Ahmad Bokhari 32' 70'; Hashim 33'; Sumantri 37'	Report

Umpires:
Anupama Puchimanda (IND)
Lynn Hassan (SIN)

5th Place Match

November 24, 2010
09:00

Malaysia	3 – 0	Thailand
Ruhaini 13'; Rahman 34'; Silin 57'	Report

Umpires:
Kim Jung-Hee (KOR)
Miskarmalia Mohd Ariffin (SIN)

Final Rank – 6th

== Kabaddi ==
Women

Preliminary – Group A

Pos	Team	Pld	W	D	L	PF	PA	PD	Pts	Qualification
1	Thailand	3	3	0	0	130	86	+44	6	Semifinals
2	Iran	3	2	0	1	173	69	+104	4	Semifinals
3	Chinese Taipei	3	1	0	2	95	139	−44	2	
4	Malaysia	3	0	0	3	62	166	−104	0	

Source: Results

November 22, 2010; 9:00	Thailand	45–19	Malaysia	Nansha Gymnasium

November 23, 2010; 15:50	Iran	38–41	Thailand	Nansha Gymnasium

November 24, 2010; 9:50	Thailand	44–29	Chinese Taipei	Nansha Gymnasium

Semifinals

November 19, 2010; 14:00	Thailand	34–23	Bangladesh	Nansha Gymnasium

Gold Medal Match

November 26, 2010; 15:00	Thailand	14–28	India	Nansha Gymnasium

Final Rank – (silver)

== Karate ==
Men

Athlete	Event	Round of 32	Round of 16	Quarterfinals	Semifinals	Final	
Athlete	Event	Opposition Score	Opposition Score	Opposition Score	Opposition Score	Opposition Score	Rank
Saratham Hirannithishatphol	–55 kg		Bye	Eldor (UZB); W 5 – 0	Emad (KSA); L 0 – 3	N/A	3rd place, bronze medalist(s)
Woraphol Kueapol	–67 kg	Gunasekaran (IND); W 3 – 0	Amabs (KUW); L 1 – 3	did not advance			

Women

Athlete	Event	Round of 32	Round of 16	Quarterfinals	Semifinals	Final	
Athlete	Event	Opposition Score	Opposition Score	Opposition Score	Opposition Score	Opposition Score	Rank
Yanisa Torrattanawathana	–55 kg		Li (CHN); L 0 – 1	Repechage match Zhetibay (KAZ); W 0 – 0	Repechage match Valentina (IND); W 0 – 0	N/A	3rd place, bronze medalist(s)

== Rugby ==
=== Men ===
Pos	Team	Pld	W	D	L	PF	PA	PD	Pts	Qualification
1	Japan	4	4	0	0	136	12	+124	12	Quarterfinals
2	Hong Kong	4	3	0	1	128	39	+89	10	Quarterfinals
3	Malaysia	4	2	0	2	68	76	−8	8	Quarterfinals
4	Thailand	4	1	0	3	76	86	−10	6	Quarterfinals
5	Mongolia	4	0	0	4	0	195	−195	4	

Source: Results

November 21, 2010
17:49

Thailand	52 – 0	Mongolia

Guangzhou University City Stadium, Guangzhou

November 22, 2010
09:23

Hong Kong	24 – 5	Thailand

Guangzhou University City Stadium, Guangzhou

November 22, 2010
12:37

Japan	33 – 5	Thailand

Guangzhou University City Stadium, Guangzhou

November 22, 2010
15:46

Thailand	14 – 29	Malaysia

Guangzhou University City Stadium, Guangzhou

Quarterfinals

November 23, 2010
11:23

China	36 – 0	Thailand

Guangzhou University City Stadium, Guangzhou

Placement for 5th – 8th

November 23, 2010
14:09

Thailand	17 – 21	Sri Lanka

Guangzhou University City Stadium, Guangzhou

7th Place Match

November 23, 2010
16:09

India	22 – 7	Thailand

Guangzhou University City Stadium, Guangzhou

Final Rank – 8th

=== Women ===
Pos	Team	Pld	W	D	L	PF	PA	PD	Pts	Qualification
1	China	3	3	0	0	116	0	+116	9	Quarterfinals
2	Thailand	3	2	0	1	65	50	+15	7	Quarterfinals
3	Hong Kong	3	1	0	2	50	46	+4	5	Quarterfinals
4	South Korea	3	0	0	3	0	135	−135	3	Quarterfinals

Source: Results

November 21, 2010
16:30

Thailand	17 – 14	Hong Kong

Guangzhou University City Stadium, Guangzhou

November 22, 2010
12:09

Thailand	48 – 0	South Korea

Guangzhou University City Stadium, Guangzhou

November 22, 2010
15:23

China	36 – 0	Thailand

Guangzhou University City Stadium, Guangzhou

Quarterfinals

November 23, 2010
10:09

Thailand	27 – 5	Singapore

Guangzhou University City Stadium, Guangzhou

Semifinals

November 23, 2010
13:18

Kazakhstan	22 – 14	Thailand

Guangzhou University City Stadium, Guangzhou

Bronze Medal Match

November 23, 2010
16:55

Hong Kong	12 – 17	Thailand

Guangzhou University City Stadium, Guangzhou

Final Rank – (bronze)

== Sailing ==
Men

Athlete	Event	Race												Total	Rank
Athlete	Event	1	2	3	4	5	6	7	8	9	10	11	12	Total	Rank
Seksan Khunthong	Mistral	5	4	5	4	2	~~6~~	4	5	5	5	6	6	51	5
Ek Boonsawad	RS:X	2	3	4	3	5	2	2	2	~~6~~	4	2	3	32	2nd place, silver medalist(s)
Totsapon Mahawichean	Dinghy Optimist	3	4	2	5	1	~~7~~	4	2	2	5	1	7	41	4
Navee Thamsoontorn; Atiwat Chomtongdee	420	1	~~OCS~~	2.25	4	1	4	5	3	DSQ	5	3	2	39.25	4

Women

Athlete	Event	Race												Total	Rank
Athlete	Event	1	2	3	4	5	6	7	8	9	10	11	12	Total	Rank
Napalai Tansai	Mistral	~~3~~	2	3	3	3	3	2	2	3	3	3	3	30	3rd place, bronze medalist(s)
Sarocha Prumprai	RS:X	3	3	3	~~DNF~~	3	3	3	3	3	3	3	3	33	3rd place, bronze medalist(s)
Noppakao Poonpat	Dinghy Optimist	~~4~~	1	2	1	1	2	1	4	2	2	3	1	20	Gold medal
Patteera Mee-U-Samsen; Narisara Yu-Sawat	420	2	4	4	2	3	3	4	3	4	4	3	2	34	4

Open

Athlete	Event	Race												Total	Rank
Athlete	Event	1	2	3	4	5	6	7	8	9	10	11	12	Total	Rank
Keerati Bualong	Laser Radial	~~8~~	1	5	2	5	3	5	1	2	3	2	4	33	Gold medal
Damrongsak Vongtim; Kitsada Vongtim	Hobie–16	1	1	1	1	2	1	1	3	2	1	1	~~4~~	15	Gold medal

== Sepak takraw ==
Men's Regu

Round Robin All times are China Standard Time (UTC+08:00)

Pos	Team	Pld	W	L	SF	SA	SD	Pts
1	Thailand	3	3	0	6	1	+5	6
2	Malaysia	3	2	1	4	2	+2	4
3	Myanmar	3	1	2	3	4	−1	2
4	China	3	0	3	0	6	−6	0

Source: Results

November 22, 2010; 9:00	China	0–2	Thailand	Haizhu Sports Centre
November 22, 2010; 9:00	(10–21, 11–21)			Haizhu Sports Centre

November 22, 2010; 19:30	Thailand	2–1	Myanmar	Haizhu Sports Centre
November 22, 2010; 19:30	(17–21, 21–15, 15–9)			Haizhu Sports Centre

November 24, 2010; 14:30	Malaysia	0–2	Thailand	Haizhu Sports Centre
November 24, 2010; 14:30	(12–21, 19–21)			Haizhu Sports Centre

Final Rank – Gold

Men's Team

Preliminary – Group A

Pos	Team	Pld	W	L	MF	MA	MD	Pts	Qualification
1	Thailand	2	2	0	6	0	+6	4	Semifinals
2	South Korea	2	1	1	3	3	0	2	Semifinals
3	Indonesia	2	0	2	0	6	−6	0	

Source: Results

November 16, 2010; 19:00	Thailand	3–0	Indonesia	Haizhu Sports Centre
November 16, 2010; 19:00	(2–0, 2–0, 2–0)			Haizhu Sports Centre

November 18, 2010; 8:30	Thailand	3–0	Indonesia	Haizhu Sports Centre
November 18, 2010; 8:30	(2–0, 2–0, 2–0)			Haizhu Sports Centre

Semifinals

November 19, 2010; 14:00	Thailand	2–0	Japan	Haizhu Sports Centre
November 19, 2010; 14:00	(2–0, 2–0)			Haizhu Sports Centre

Gold Medal Match

November 20, 2010; 14:00	Thailand	2–0	Malaysia	Haizhu Sports Centre
November 20, 2010; 14:00	(2–0, 2–0)			Haizhu Sports Centre

Final Rank – Gold

Women's Regu

Round Robin

Pos	Team	Pld	W	L	SF	SA	SD	Pts
1	Thailand	3	3	0	6	1	+5	6
2	Vietnam	3	2	1	5	2	+3	4
3	China	3	1	2	2	5	−3	2
4	Myanmar	3	0	3	1	6	−5	0

Source: Results

November 22, 2010; 14:30	China	0–2	Thailand	Haizhu Sports Centre
November 22, 2010; 14:30	(10–21, 7–21)			Haizhu Sports Centre

November 23, 2010; 9:00	Thailand	2–1	Myanmar	Haizhu Sports Centre
November 23, 2010; 9:00	(21–9, 21–19)			Haizhu Sports Centre

November 24, 2010; 16:00	Vietnam	1–2	Thailand	Haizhu Sports Centre
November 24, 2010; 16:00	(15–21, 21–14, 11–15)			Haizhu Sports Centre

Final Rank – Gold

Women's Team

Preliminary – Group B

Pos	Team	Pld	W	L	MF	MA	MD	Pts	Qualification
1	Thailand	3	3	0	9	0	+9	6	Semifinals
2	China	3	2	1	6	3	+3	4	Semifinals
3	South Korea	3	1	2	3	6	−3	2	
4	India	3	0	3	0	9	−9	0	

Source: Results

November 16, 2010; 14:00	Thailand	3–0	China	Haizhu Sports Centre
November 16, 2010; 14:00	(2–0, 2–0, 2–0)			Haizhu Sports Centre

November 17, 2010; 14:00	Thailand	3–0	South Korea	Haizhu Sports Centre
November 17, 2010; 14:00	(2–0, 2–0, 2–0)			Haizhu Sports Centre

November 18, 2010; 14:00	Thailand	3–0	India	Haizhu Sports Centre
November 18, 2010; 14:00	(2–0, 2–0, 2–0)			Haizhu Sports Centre

Semifinals

November 19, 2010; 14:00	Thailand	2–0	Vietnam	Haizhu Sports Centre
November 19, 2010; 14:00	(2–1, 2–1)			Haizhu Sports Centre

Gold Medal Match

November 20, 2010; 14:00	China	0–2	Thailand	Haizhu Sports Centre
November 20, 2010; 14:00	(0–2, 0–2)			Haizhu Sports Centre

Final Rank – Gold

== Shooting ==
Men

Event	Athlete	Qualification		Final	
Event	Athlete	Score	Rank	Score	Rank
10 m air pistol	Pongpol Kulchairattana	574	19	did not advance	
10 m air pistol	Noppadol Sutiviruch	572	21	did not advance	
10 m air pistol	Wirat Amphalop	557	43	did not advance	
10 m air pistol team	Pongpol Kulchairattana; Noppadol Sutiviruch; Wirat Amphalop			1703	9
10 m air rifle	Varavut Majchacheeap	589	16	did not advance	
10 m air rifle	Worawat Suriyajun	578	39	did not advance	
10 m air rifle	Nuttakorn Tongwon	578	40	did not advance	
10 m air rifle team	Varavut Majchacheeap; Worawat Suriyajun; Nuttakorn Tongwon			1745	10
10 m running target	Mongkonchai Meechu			548	17
10 m running target mixed	Mongkonchai Meechu			354	19
25 m center fire pistol	Pongpol Kulchairattana			580	7
25 m center fire pistol	Prakarn Karndee			572	23
25 m center fire pistol	Opas Ruengpanyawut			568	29
25 m center fire pistol team	Pongpol Kulchairattana; Prakarn Karndee; Opas Ruengpanyawut			1720	7
25 m rapid fire pistol	Pongpol Kulchairattana	596	15	did not advance	
25 m rapid fire pistol	Opas Ruengpanyawut	555	21	did not advance	
25 m rapid fire pistol	Sriyanon Karndee	532	25	did not advance	
25 m rapid fire pistol team	Pongpol Kulchairattana; Opas Ruengpanyawut; Sriyanon Karndee			1656	5
25 m standard pistol	Prakarn Karndee			570	4
25 m standard pistol	Pruet Sriyaphan			560	14
25 m standard pistol	Vorapol Kulchairattana			520	38
25 m standard pistol team	Prakarn Karndee; Pruet Sriyaphan; Vorapol Kulchairattana			1650	8
50 m pistol	Kasem Khamhaeng	545	21	did not advance	
50 m pistol	Noppadol Sutiviruch	538	31	did not advance	
50 m pistol	Pruet Sriyaphan	532	36	did not advance	
50 m pistol team	Kasem Khamhaeng; Noppadol Sutiviruch; Pruet Sriyaphan			1615	10
50 m rifle 3 positions	Tavarit Majchacheep	1132	27	did not advance	
50 m rifle 3 positions	Varavut Majchacheeap	1131	28	did not advance	
50 m rifle 3 positions	Pongsakorn Kaewja	1110	38	did not advance	
50 m rifle 3 positions team	Tavarit Majchacheep; Varavut Majchacheeap; Pongsakorn Kaewja			3373	10
50 m rifle prone	Tavarit Majchacheep	589	16	did not advance	
50 m rifle prone	Attapon Uea-Aree	586	30	did not advance	
50 m rifle prone	Komkrit Kongnamchok	581	40	did not advance	
50 m rifle prone team	Tavarit Majchacheep; Attapon Uea-Aree; Komkrit Kongnamchok			1756	6
Skeet	Jiranunt Hataichukiat	113	15	did not advance	
Trap	Savate Sresthaporn	116	5 Q	129	6
Double trap	Athimeth Khamgasem			132	14

Women

Event	Athlete	Qualification		Final	
Event	Athlete	Score	Rank	Score	Rank
10 m air pistol	Tanyaporn Pruksakorn	382	4 Q	477.8	6
10 m air pistol	Kanokkan Chaimongkol	382	4 Q	476.2	7
10 m air pistol	Wanwarin Yusawat	374	27	did not advance	
10 m air pistol team	Tanyaporn Pruksakorn; Kanokkan Chaimongkol; Wanwarin Yusawat			1138	4
10 m air rifle	Supaluk Pongsinwijit	393	18	did not advance	
10 m air rifle	Thanyalak Chotphibunsin	392	21	did not advance	
10 m air rifle	Sununta Majchacheep	390	30	did not advance	
10 m air rifle team	Supaluk Pongsinwijit; Thanyalak Chotphibunsin; Sununta Majchacheep			1175	8
10 m running target	Thidarat At-Takit			346	12
25 m pistol	Tanyaporn Pruksakorn	579	7 Q	769.6	8
25 m pistol	Naphaswan Yangpaiboon	574	15	did not advance	
25 m pistol	Kanokkan Chaimongkol	545	37	did not advance	
25 m pistol team	Tanyaporn Pruksakorn; Naphaswan Yangpaiboon; Kanokkan Chaimongkol			1698	10
50 m rifle 3 positions	Thanyalak Chotphibunsin	573	10	did not advance	
50 m rifle 3 positions	Supamas Wankaew	570	20	did not advance	
50 m rifle 3 positions	Sununta Majchacheep	567	25	did not advance	
50 m rifle 3 positions team	Thanyalak Chotphibunsin; Supamas Wankaew; Sununta Majchacheep			1710	8
50 m rifle prone	Ratchadaporn Plengsaengthong			591	6
50 m rifle prone	Supamas Wankaew			588	9
50 m rifle prone	Vichuda Pichitkanjanakul			584	20
50 m rifle prone team	Ratchadaporn Plengsaengthong; Supamas Wankaew; Vichuda Pichitkanjanakul			1763	2nd place, silver medalist(s)
Skeet	Suttiya Jiewchaloemmit	67	3 Q	88	3rd place, bronze medalist(s)
Skeet	Nutchaya Sut-Arporn	66	4 Q	88	6
Skeet	Isarapa Imprasertsuk	63	12	did not advance	
Skeet team	Suttiya Jiewchaloemmit; Nutchaya Sut-Arporn; Isarapa Imprasertsuk			196	3rd place, bronze medalist(s)
Trap	Nanpapas Viravaidya	60	16	did not advance	
Double trap	Janejira Srisongkram			104	3rd place, bronze medalist(s)
Double trap	Chattaya Kitcharoen			92	8
Double trap	Punnapa Asvanit			80	
Double trap team	Janejira Srisongkram; Chattaya Kitcharoen; Punnapa Asvanit			276	3rd place, bronze medalist(s)

== Softball ==
Preliminary

Pos	Team	Pld	W	L	RF	RA	PCT	GB	Qualification
1	Chinese Taipei	5	5	0	26	7	1.000	—	Semifinals
2	Japan	5	4	1	25	3	.800	1	Semifinals
3	China	5	3	2	24	9	.600	2	Semifinals
4	South Korea	5	2	3	13	14	.400	3	Semifinals
5	Philippines	5	1	4	7	24	.200	4	
6	Thailand	5	0	5	2	40	.000	5	

Source: Results

November 19, 2010 — 13:00

Team	1	2	3	4	5	6	7	R	H	E
Thailand	0	0	0	x	x	x	x	0	0	6
Japan	9	4	2	x	x	x	x	15	12	0

November 20, 2010 — 15:30

Team	1	2	3	4	5	6	7	R	H	E
China	0	1	2	3	3	x	x	9	10	0
Thailand	0	0	0	0	0	x	x	0	1	1

November 21, 2010 — 18:00

Team	1	2	3	4	5	6	7	R	H	E
Thailand	0	0	0	0	0	0	0	0	2	1
Philippines	0	1	0	0	0	0	x	1	4	0

November 22, 2010 — 15:30

Team	1	2	3	4	5	6	7	R	H	E
Thailand	0	0	2	0	0	0	0	2	6	4
South Korea	0	4	0	2	0	2	x	8	10	1

November 23, 2010 — 18:00

Team	1	2	3	4	5	6	7	R	H	E
Thailand	0	0	0	0	0	x	x	0	1	1
Chinese Taipei	3	3	0	1	x	x	x	7	7	0

Semifinals – Did not advance

== Table tennis ==
Women

Preliminary – Group C

Rank	Team	Pld	W	L	MW	ML
1	North Korea (PRK)	4	4	0	12	1
2	Thailand (THA)	4	3	1	10	4
3	Vietnam (VIE)	4	2	2	7	6
4	Uzbekistan (UZB)	4	1	3	3	9
5	Nepal (NEP)	4	0	4	0	12

13 November; 10:00	Report	Thailand	3–0	Uzbekistan
Score by game:
Nanthana Komwong	3–0	Olga Kim
Suthasini Sawettabut	3–0	Indira Kagirova
Anisara Muangsuk	3–0	Nodira Burkhankhodjaeva

November 13; 18:00	Report	Thailand	3–0	Nepal
Score by game:
Nanthana Komwong	3–0	Renuka Khatri
Suthasini Sawettabut	3–0	Nabita Shrestha
Pornrat Rupsung	3–0	Swechchha Nembang

November 14; 10:00	Report	North Korea	3–1	Thailand
Score by game:
Kim Jong	3–0	Nanthana Komwong
Kim Hye-Song	2–3	Suthasini Sawettabut
Han Hye-song	3–1	Anisara Muangsuk
Kim Jong	3–0	Suthasini Sawettabut

November 14; 14:00	Report	Vietnam	1–3	Thailand
Score by game:
Mai Hoang My Trang	3–2	Suthasini Sawettabut
Mai Xuan Hang	0–3	Nanthana Komwong
Pham Thi Thien Kim	0–3	Anisara Muangsuk
Mai Hoang My Trang	1–3	Nanthana Komwong

Quarterfinals

November 14; 20:00	Report	Thailand	0–3	South Korea
Score by game:
Nanthana Komwong	2–3	Park Mi-Young
Anisara Muangsuk	0–3	Kim Kyung-Ah
Suthasini Sawettabut	2–3	Seok Ha-Jung

Semifinals – Did not advance

== Taekwondo ==
Men

Athlete	Event	Round of 32	Round of 16	Quarterfinals	Semifinals	Final	
Athlete	Event	Opposition Score	Opposition Score	Opposition Score	Opposition Score	Opposition Score	Rank
Chutchawal Khawlaor	–54 kg	Nakagawa (JPN); W 5 – 3	Nazaraliev (UZB); W 4 – 0	Nguyen (VIE); W 9 – 1	Hsu (TPE); W 7 – 4	Kim (KOR); W 8 – 6	Gold medal
Pen-Ek Karaket	–58 kg	Kin (MAC); W 13 – 0	Bekkassymov (KAZ); W 4 – 3	Mohammad (AFG); W 13 – 2	Xu (CHN); W 6 – 2	Wei (TPE); L 2 – 2	2nd place, silver medalist(s)
Nacha Punthong	–64 kg	Thammavong (LAO); W 9 – 1	Dendup (BHU); W (RSC)	Mitsuhashi (JPN); W 5 – 4	Lakzaee (AFG); W 7 – 3	Lee (KOR); L 9 – 10	2nd place, silver medalist(s)
Supakit Chanteerawong	–68 kg	Bagheri (IRI); L 1 – 5	Did not advance				
Patiwat Thongsalap	–74 kg	Bye	Wangdi (BHU); W 8 – 3	Morrison (PHI); W 20 – 11	Azadani (IRI); L 3 – 5	N/A	3rd place, bronze medalist(s)

Women

Athlete	Event	Round of 32	Round of 16	Quarterfinals	Semifinals	Final	
Athlete	Event	Opposition Score	Opposition Score	Opposition Score	Opposition Score	Opposition Score	Rank
Buttree Puedpong	–46 kg		Dema (BHU); W 19 – 1	Huang (TPE); L 0 – 3	Did not advance		
Chanapa Sonkham	–49 kg		Bye	Teo (MAS); W 6 – 3	Wu (CHN); L 0 – 5	N/A	3rd place, bronze medalist(s)
Sarita Phongsri	–53 kg		Basbous (LIB); W 3 – 0	Bhandari (IND); W 6 – 0	Kwon (KOR); W (WD)	Nguyen (VIE); W 4 – 3	Gold medal
Rangsiya Nisaisom	–57 kg		Lee (KOR); L 3 – 12	Did not advance			
Dhunyanun Premwaew	–62 kg		Manalo (PHI); W 5 – 2	Agustina (INA); W 11 – 0	Asemani (IRI); L 2 – 6	N/A	3rd place, bronze medalist(s)
Rapatkorn Prasopsuk	–73 kg			Davin (CAM); W 1 – 1	Luo (CHN); L 1 – 2	N/A	3rd place, bronze medalist(s)

== Volleyball ==
=== Beach volleyball ===
Men

Athlete	Event	Preliminary		Round of 16	Quarterfinals	Semifinals	Final	
Athlete	Event	Pools	Rank	Opposition Score	Opposition Score	Opposition Score	Opposition Score	Rank
Sittichai Sangkhachot; Teerapat Pollueang	Doubles	Ababacar – Abdulkhaleq (QAT); L 1 – 2	Pool D 4	Did not advance				
Sittichai Sangkhachot; Teerapat Pollueang	Doubles	Ahmed – Haitham (OMA); L 0 – 2	Pool D 4	Did not advance				
Sittichai Sangkhachot; Teerapat Pollueang	Doubles	Naeini – Raoufi (IRI); L 0 – 2	Pool D 4	Did not advance				
Panupong Toyam; Niphon Nimnuan	Doubles	Ahmed – Ismaeel (QAT); W 2 – 0	Pool F 2 Q	Gao – Li (CHN); L 0 – 2	Did not advance			
Panupong Toyam; Niphon Nimnuan	Doubles	Mohammed – Sara (IND); W 2 – 0	Pool F 2 Q	Gao – Li (CHN); L 0 – 2	Did not advance			
Panupong Toyam; Niphon Nimnuan	Doubles	Asahi – Shiratori (JPN); L 0 – 2	Pool F 2 Q	Gao – Li (CHN); L 0 – 2	Did not advance			

Women

Athlete	Event	Preliminary		Round of 16	Quarterfinals	Semifinals	Final	
Athlete	Event	Pools	Rank	Opposition Score	Opposition Score	Opposition Score	Opposition Score	Rank
Yupa Phokongploy; Kamoltip Kulna	Doubles	Urata – Nishibori (JPN); L 0 – 2	Pool C 3 Q	Issayeva – Rakhmatulina (KAZ); W 2 – 0	Tenpaksee – Sannok (THA); L 1 – 2	Did not advance		
Yupa Phokongploy; Kamoltip Kulna	Doubles	GHL – PPHH (SRI); W 2 – 0	Pool C 3 Q	Issayeva – Rakhmatulina (KAZ); W 2 – 0	Tenpaksee – Sannok (THA); L 1 – 2	Did not advance		
Yupa Phokongploy; Kamoltip Kulna	Doubles	Kou – Chang (TPE); L 0 – 2	Pool C 3 Q	Issayeva – Rakhmatulina (KAZ); W 2 – 0	Tenpaksee – Sannok (THA); L 1 – 2	Did not advance		
Usa Tenpaksee; Jarunee Sannok	Doubles	KKLG – WW (SRI); W 2 – 0	Pool D 1 Q	Lee – Lee (KOR); W 2 – 0	Phokongploy – Kulna (THA); W 2 – 1	Xue – Zhang (CHN); L 0 – 2	Bronze medal match Luk – Beh (MAS); W 2 – 0	3rd place, bronze medalist(s)
Usa Tenpaksee; Jarunee Sannok	Doubles	Lee – Kwak (KOR); W 2 – 0	Pool D 1 Q	Lee – Lee (KOR); W 2 – 0	Phokongploy – Kulna (THA); W 2 – 1	Xue – Zhang (CHN); L 0 – 2	Bronze medal match Luk – Beh (MAS); W 2 – 0	3rd place, bronze medalist(s)
Usa Tenpaksee; Jarunee Sannok	Doubles	Mashkova – Tsimbalova (KAZ); W 2 – 1	Pool D 1 Q	Lee – Lee (KOR); W 2 – 0	Phokongploy – Kulna (THA); W 2 – 1	Xue – Zhang (CHN); L 0 – 2	Bronze medal match Luk – Beh (MAS); W 2 – 0	3rd place, bronze medalist(s)

=== Indoor ===
==== Men's Tournament ====
Team roster

#	Name	Club	Date of birth	Height	Weight	Spike	Block
1	Jirayu Raksakaew	(Thailand) Air Force	August 3, 1987	194	84	350	330
2	Montri Vaenpradab	(Thailand) Air Force	August 18, 1987	195	75	339	329
3	Wanchai Tabwises	(Thailand) Army	February 11, 1986	182	82	339	332
6	Shotivat Tivsuwan	(Thailand) Army	July 20, 1986	190	78	338	327
7	Uranan Boudang	(Thailand) Air Force	December 20, 1987	185	73	342	331
9	Kittikum Sri-Utthawong	(Thailand) Air Force	January 10, 1986	194	79	345	355
10	Piyarat Toontubthai	(Thailand) Air Force	December 10, 1987	171	80	310	305
11	Pissanu Harnkhomtun	(Thailand) Air Force	May 1, 1986	191	81	341	334
12	Pongsakorn Nimawan	(Thailand) Army	August 27, 1984	190	80	335	325
13	Somporn Wannapapra	(Thailand) Army	May 7, 1988	189	76	338	332
14	Kitsada Somkane	(Thailand) Army	September 28, 1990	190	79	342	335
17	Saranchit Charoensuk	(Thailand) Air Force	July 20, 1987	181	76	325	319
	Team Average			187	78	337	327

Preliminary Round – Group A

Pos	Team	Pld	W	L	Pts	SPW	SPL	SPR	SW	SL	SR
1	China	3	3	0	6	268	220	1.218	9	2	4.500
2	Thailand	3	2	1	5	305	300	1.017	7	7	1.000
3	Pakistan	3	1	2	4	283	308	0.919	6	8	0.750
4	Chinese Taipei	3	0	3	3	254	282	0.901	4	9	0.444

Source: Results

November 13, 2010; 18:00	Chinese Taipei	2–3	Thailand	Guangyao Gymnasium
November 13, 2010; 18:00	(23–25, 25–17, 25–21, 13–25, 9–15)			Guangyao Gymnasium

November 14, 2010; 16:00	Pakistan	2–3	Thailand	Guangyao Gymnasium
November 14, 2010; 16:00	(19–25, 30–28, 20–25, 25–18, 13–15)			Guangyao Gymnasium

November 17, 2010; 18:00	China	3–1	Thailand	Guangyao Gymnasium
November 17, 2010; 18:00	(25–19, 21–25, 25–22, 27–25)			Guangyao Gymnasium

Placement for Quarterfinalists – Group E

Pos	Team	Pld	W	L	Pts	SPW	SPL	SPR	SW	SL	SR
1	Iran	3	3	0	6	231	189	1.222	9	0	MAX
2	China	3	2	1	5	234	220	1.064	6	4	1.500
3	Thailand	3	1	2	4	263	288	0.913	4	8	0.500
4	Saudi Arabia	3	0	3	3	230	261	0.881	2	9	0.222

Source: Results

November 19, 2010; 18:45	Iran	3–0	Thailand	Zhongda Gymnasium
November 19, 2010; 18:45	(25–17, 27–25, 25–21)			Zhongda Gymnasium

November 20, 2010; 18:35	Thailand	3–2	Saudi Arabia	Zhongda Gymnasium
November 20, 2010; 18:35	(25–23, 27–25, 20–25, 20–25, 17–15)			Zhongda Gymnasium

Quarterfinals

November 21, 2010; 16:00	India	0–3	Thailand	Zhongda Gymnasium
November 21, 2010; 16:00	(20–25, 23–25, 22–25)			Zhongda Gymnasium

Semifinals

November 24, 2010; 20:50	Iran	3–0	Thailand	Guangyao Gymnasium
November 24, 2010; 20:50	(25–16, 25–21, 25–16)			Guangyao Gymnasium

Bronze Medal Match

November 26, 2010; 19:00	South Korea	3–0	Thailand	Guangzhou Gymnasium
November 26, 2010; 19:00	(25–19, 25–17, 28–26)			Guangzhou Gymnasium

Final Rank – 4th

==== Women's Tournament ====
Team roster

#	Name	Club	Date of birth	Height	Weight	Spike	Block
1	Piyanut Pannoy	(Thailand) Federbrau	November 10, 1989	171	68	280	275
3	Rasamee Supamool	(Thailand) Federbrau	January 18, 1992	178	68	285	276
5	Pleumjit Thinkaow	(Thailand) Federbrau	November 9, 1983	180	63	298	293
6	Onuma Sittirak	(Thailand) Federbrau	June 13, 1986	175	72	304	285
8	Utaiwan Kaensing	(Thailand) Federbrau	September 7, 1988	189	86	310	295
10	Wilavan Apinyapong	(Thailand) Federbrau	June 6, 1984	174	68	294	282
11	Amporn Hyapha	(Thailand) Federbrau	May 19, 1985	180	70	301	290
12	Kamonporn Sukmak	(Thailand) Federbrau	February 29, 1988	174	63	285	275
13	Nootsara Tomkom	(Thailand) Federbrau	July 7, 1985	169	57	289	278
14	Sutadta Chuewulim	(Thailand) Federbrau	December 19, 1992	172	62	280	270
15	Malika Kanthong	(Thailand) Federbrau	January 8, 1987	177	63	310	290
18	Em-Orn Phanusit	(Thailand) Federbrau	March 25, 1988	177	68	280	275
	Team Average			176	67	293	282

Preliminary Round – Group A

Pos	Team	Pld	W	L	Pts	SPW	SPL	SPR	SW	SL	SR
1	China	4	4	0	8	360	225	1.600	12	3	4.000
2	South Korea	4	3	1	7	320	214	1.495	11	3	3.667
3	Thailand	4	2	2	6	295	232	1.272	7	6	1.167
4	Mongolia	4	1	3	5	175	251	0.697	3	9	0.333
5	Tajikistan	4	0	4	4	72	300	0.240	0	12	0.000

Source: Results

November 18, 2010; 18:40	Thailand	0–3	South Korea	Guangwai Gymnasium
November 18, 2010; 18:40	(20–25, 19–25, 17–25)			Guangwai Gymnasium

November 19, 2010; 12:00	Mongolia	0–3	Thailand	Guangwai Gymnasium
November 19, 2010; 12:00	(6–25, 9–25, 22–25)			Guangwai Gymnasium

November 21, 2010; 18:41	Thailand	3–0	Tajikistan	Guangwai Gymnasium
November 21, 2010; 18:41	(25–7, 25–8, 25–6)			Guangwai Gymnasium

November 22, 2010; 20:00	China	3–1	Thailand	Guangwai Gymnasium
November 22, 2010; 20:00	(25–23, 25–21, 24–26, 25–19)			Guangwai Gymnasium

Quarterfinals

November 24, 2010; 14:00	North Korea	3–2	Thailand	Guangwai Gymnasium
November 24, 2010; 14:00	(25–23, 17–25, 27–25, 7–25, 15–12)			Guangwai Gymnasium

Placement for 5th – 8th

November 25, 2010; 16:00	Chinese Taipei	0–3	Thailand	Guangwai Gymnasium
November 25, 2010; 16:00	(13–25, 22–25, 27–29)			Guangwai Gymnasium

5th Place Match

November 27, 2010; 12:30	Japan	1–3	Thailand	Guangwai Gymnasium
November 27, 2010; 12:30	(12–25, 28–26, 14–25, 26–28)			Guangwai Gymnasium

Final Rank – 5th
