= South Korea at the 2010 Asian Games =

- IOC code: KOR
- NOC: Korean Olympic Committee

in Guangzhou
- Competitors: 806 in 41 sports
- Flag bearer: Yoon Kyung-shin
- Medals Ranked 2nd: Gold 76 Silver 65 Bronze 91 Total 232

Asian Games appearances (overview)
- 1954; 1958; 1962; 1966; 1970; 1974; 1978; 1982; 1986; 1990; 1994; 1998; 2002; 2006; 2010; 2014; 2018; 2022; 2026

The Republic of Korea participated in the 2010 Asian Games in Guangzhou, China on 12–27 November 2010. It won 76 gold, 65 silver and 91 bronze medals at the Games.

== Medal summary ==
=== Medal table ===
Sport	Gold	Silver	Bronze	Total
Shooting	13	8	7	28
Bowling	8	5	2	15
Fencing	7	2	5	14
Judo	6	3	5	14
Taekwondo	4	4	2	10
Swimming	4	3	6	13
Athletics	4	3	3	10
Cycling	4	1	0	5
Golf	4	0	1	5
Archery	4	0	0	4
Roller sports	3	2	2	7
Weiqi	3	0	1	4
Soft tennis	2	4	4	10
Equestrian	2	1	0	3
Gymnastics	2	0	3	5
Sailing	1	2	3	6
Weightlifting	1	2	2	5
Modern pentathlon	1	2	2	5
Badminton	1	1	5	7
Handball	1	0	1	2
Baseball	1	0	0	1
Dancesport	0	7	3	10
wrestling	0	3	6	9
Rowing	0	3	3	6
Wushu	0	2	2	4
Basketball	0	2	0	2
Table tennis	0	1	4	5
Sepaktakraw	0	1	2	3
Cue sports	0	1	1	2
Volleyball	0	1	1	2
Field hockey	0	1	0	1
Karate	0	0	3	3
Boxing	0	0	2	2
Football	0	0	2	2
Tennis	0	0	2	2
Diving	0	0	1	1
Dragon boat	0	0	1	1
Rugby union	0	0	1	1
Squash	0	0	1	1
Synchronized swimming	0	0	1	1
Triathlon	0	0	1	1
Total	76	65	91	232

=== Medalists ===
==== Gold medal ====
Medal	Name	Sport	Event
Gold	Kim Woo-Jin	Archery	Men's Individual
Gold	Yun Ok-hee	Archery	Women's Individual
Gold	Im Dong-Hyun, Kim Woo-Jin, Oh Jin-Hyeok	Archery	Men's Team
Gold	Joo Hyun-Jung, Ki Bo-Bae, Yun Ok-hee	Archery	Women's Team
Gold	Kim Deok-Hyeon	Athletics	Men's Long Jump
Gold	Ji Young-Jun	Athletics	Men's Marathon
Gold	Lee Yeon-Kyung	Athletics	Women's 100m Hurdles
Gold	Jung Soon-Ok	Athletics	Women's Long Jump
Gold	Shin Baek-cheol, Lee Hyo-jung	Badminton	Mixed Doubles
Gold	Ahn Ji-Man, Cho Dong-Chan, Jeong Keun-Woo, Kim Kang-Min, Lee Dae-Ho, Son Si-hyun, Choi Jeong, Lee Yong-Kyu, Kang Jung-Ho, Choo Shin-Soo, Chong Tae-Hyon, Park Kyung-Oan, Kim Myung-Sung, Im Tae-Hoon, Ko Chang-Sung, Lee Jong-wook, Song Eun-Beom, Kang Min-Ho, Hyun-soo Kim, Bong Jung-Keun, Kim Tae-Kyun, Yang Hyeon-Jong, Ryu Hyun-Jin	Baseball	Men's Team
Gold	Choi Bok-Eum	Bowling	Men's Masters
Gold	Choi Bok-Eum, Choi Yong-Kyu, Jang Dong-Chul	Bowling	Men's Trios
Gold	Choi Bok-Eum, Choi Yong-Kyu, Hong Hae-Sol, Cho Young-Seon, Jang Dong-Chul, Seo Sang-Cheon	Bowling	Men's Team of Five
Gold	Hwang Sun-Ok	Bowling	Women's Singles
Gold	Hwang Sun-Ok	Bowling	Women's All Events
Gold	Hwang Sun-Ok	Bowling	Women's Masters
Gold	Choi Jin-A, Gang Hye-Eun	Bowling	Women's Doubles
Gold	Choi Jin-A, Hwang Sun-Ok, Jeon Eun-Hee, Gang Hye-Eun, Son Yun-Hee, Hong Su-Yeon	Bowling	Women's Team of Five
Gold	Jang Sun-jae	Cycling	Men's Individual Pursuit
Gold	Choi Hyeong-Min	Cycling	Men's Individual Time Trial
Gold	Lee Min-Hye	Cycling	Women's Individual Time Trial
Gold	Park Seon-Ho, Jang Sun-jae, Choi Dong-Hyun, Park Sung-Baek, Cho Ho-Sung, Hwang In-Hyeok	Cycling	Men's Team Pursuit
Gold	Hwang Young-Shik	Equestrian	Dressage Individual
Gold	Choi Jun-Sang, Kim Kyun-Sub, Kim Dong-Seon, Hwang Young-Shik	Equestrian	Dressage Team
Gold	Choi Byung-Chul	Fencing	Men's Individual Foil
Gold	Kim Woo-Jin	Fencing	Men's Individual Épée
Gold	Gu Bon-Gil	Fencing	Men's Individual Sabre
Gold	Nam Hyun-Hee	Fencing	Women's Individual Foil
Gold	Kim Hye-Lim	Fencing	Women's Individual Sabre
Gold	Jung Jin-Sun, Jung Seung-Hwa, Kim Woo-Jin, Park Kyoung-Doo	Fencing	Men's Team Épée
Gold	Jeon Hee-Sook, Nam Hyun-Hee, Oh Ha-Na, Seo Mi-Jung	Fencing	Women's Team Foil
Gold	Kim Meen-whee	Golf	Men's Individual
Gold	Kim Hyun-Soo	Golf	Women's Individual
Gold	Kim Meen-whee, Park Il-Hwan, Lee Jae-Hyeok, Lee Kyoung-hoon	Golf	Men's Team
Gold	Kim Ji-Hee, Kim Hyun-Soo, Han Jung-Eun	Golf	Women's Team
Gold	Kim Soo-Myun	Gymnastics	Men's Floor
Gold	Yang Hak-Seon	Gymnastics	Men's Vault
Gold	Lee Chang-Woo, Jeong Eui-Kyeong, Sim Jae-Bok, Park Kyung-Suk, Kim Tae-Wan, Jung Su-Young, Park Jung-Gyu, Lee Sang-Wook, Park Chan-Young, Oh Yun-Suk, Lee Tae-Young, Kang Il-Koo, Lee Jang-Woo, Yu Dong-Geun, Baek Won-Chul, Yoon Kyung-shin	Handball	Men's Team
Gold	Kim Joo-Jin	Judo	Men's -66kg
Gold	Kim Jae-Bum	Judo	Men's -81kg
Gold	Hwang Hee-Tae	Judo	Men's -100kg
Gold	Kim Soo-Wan	Judo	Men's +100kg
Gold	Hwang Ye-Sul	Judo	Women's -70kg
Gold	Jeong Gyeong-Mi	Judo	Women's -78kg
Gold	Kim Ki-Hyeon, Jung Hwon-Ho, Lee Choon-Hwan, Kim In-Hong	Modern pentathlon	Men's Team
Gold	Son Geun-Seong	Roller sports	Men's 10000m Points+Elimination
Gold	An Yi-Seul	Roller sports	Women's 300m Time-trial Race
Gold	Woo Hyo-Sook	Roller sports	Women's 10000m Points+Elimination
Gold	Ha Ji-Min	Sailing	Men's Laser
Gold	Lee Dae-myung	Shooting	Men's 10m Air Pistol
Gold	Park Byung-Taek	Shooting	Men's 25m Center Fire Pistol
Gold	Hong Seong-Hwan	Shooting	Men's 25m Standard Pistol
Gold	Kim Hak-Man	Shooting	Men's 50m Rifle Prone
Gold	Han Jin-Seop	Shooting	Men's 50m Rifle 3 Positions
Gold	Jin Jong-oh, Lee Dae-myung, Lee Sang-Do	Shooting	Men's 10m Air Pistol Team
Gold	Hong Seong-Hwan, Hwang Yoon-Sam, Jang Dae-Kyu	Shooting	Men's 25m Standard Pistol Team
Gold	Jin Jong-oh, Lee Dae-myung, Lee Sang-Do	Shooting	Men's 50m Pistol Team
Gold	Kim Hak-Man, Han Jin-Seop, Kim Jong-Hyun	Shooting	Men's 50m Rifle Prone Team
Gold	Han Jin-Seop, Kim Jong-Hyun, Lee Hyun-Tae	Shooting	Men's 50m Rifle 3 Positions Team
Gold	Kim Yun-Mi	Shooting	Women's 10m Air Pistol
Gold	Kim Yun-Mi, Kim Byung-He, Lee Ho-Lim	Shooting	Women's 10m Air Pistol Team
Gold	Kim Jung-Mi, Kwon Na-Ra, Lee Yun-Chae	Shooting	Women's 50m Rifle Prone Team
Gold	Lee Yo-Han	Soft tennis	Men's Singles
Gold	Ji Yong-Min, Kim Kyung-Ryun	Soft tennis	Mixed Doubles
Gold	Park Tae-Hwan	Swimming	Men's 100m Freestyle
Gold	Park Tae-Hwan	Swimming	Men's 200m Freestyle
Gold	Park Tae-Hwan	Swimming	Men's 400m Freestyle
Gold	Jeong Da-Rae	Swimming	Women's 200m Breaststroke
Gold	Lee Dae-Hoon	Taekwondo	Men's -63kg
Gold	Heo Jung-Nyoung	Taekwondo	Men's +87kg
Gold	Lee Sung-Hye	Taekwondo	Women's -57kg
Gold	No Eun-Sil	Taekwondo	Women's -62kg
Gold	Jang Mi-Ran	Weightlifting	Women's +75kg
Gold	Cho Han-Seung, Choi Cheol-han, Kang Dong-Yun, Lee Chang-ho, Lee Se-Dol, Park Jeong-Hwan	Weiqi	Men's Team
Gold	Cho Hye-Yeon, Kim Yoon-Yeong, Lee Min-Jin, Lee Seul-A	Weiqi	Women's Team
Gold	Lee Seul-A, Park Jeong-Hwan	Weiqi	Mixed Doubles

==== Silver medal ====
Medal	Name	Sport	Event
Silver	Park Jae-Myong	Athletics	Men's Javelin Throw
Silver	Kim Yoo-Suk	Athletics	Men's Pole Vault
Silver	Kim Kun-Woo	Athletics	Men's Decathlon
Silver	Son Wan-ho, Hong Ji-hoon, Lee Hyun-il, Lee Yong-dae, Ko Sung-hyun, Kim Gi-jung, Shin Baek-cheol, Park Sung-hwan, Jung Jae-sung, Yoo Yeon-seong	Badminton	Men's Team
Silver	Park Chan-Hee, Lee Jung-Suk, Yang Dong-Geun, Kim Joo-Sung, Ha Seung-Jin, Lee Kyu-sup, Cho Sung-min, Yang Hee-Jong, Ham Ji-Hoon, Kim Sung-Chul, Lee Seung-Jun, Oh Se-Keun	Basketball	Men's Team
Silver	Kim Bo-Mi, Kim Ji-Yoon, Jung Sun-Hwa, Lee Mi-Sun, Lee Kyung-Eun, Kang A-Jeong, Byun Yeon-Ha, Park Jung-Eun, Ha Eun-Joo, Kim Dan-Bi, Kim Kye-Ryung, Sin Jung-Ja	Basketball	Women's Team
Silver	Choi Yong-Kyu	Bowling	Men's All Events
Silver	Hong Hae-Sol, Cho Young-Seon, Seo Sang-Cheon	Bowling	Men's Trios
Silver	Choi Jin-A	Bowling	Women's All Events
Silver	Son Yun-Hee, Hong Su-Yeon	Bowling	Women's Doubles
Silver	Choi Jin-A, Hwang Sun-Ok, Son Yun-Hee	Bowling	Women's Trios
Silver	Kim Ga-Young	Cue sports	Women's 8-Ball Pool Singles
Silver	Lee Min-Hye	Cycling	Women's Individual Pursuit
Silver	Nam Sang-Wung, Song Yi-Na	Dancesport	Standard – Tango
Silver	Nam Sang-Wung, Song Yi-Na	Dancesport	Standard – Slow Foxtrot
Silver	Jang Se-Jin, Lee Hae-In	Dancesport	Latin – Samba
Silver	Jang Se-Jin, Lee Hae-In	Dancesport	Latin – Paso Doble
Silver	Kim Do-Hyeon, Park Su-Myo	Dancesport	Latin – Cha-cha-cha
Silver	Kim Do-Hyeon, Park Su-Myo	Dancesport	Latin – Jive
Silver	Jo Sang-Hyo, Lee Se-Hee	Dancesport	Standard Five Dances Competition
Silver	Cheon Jae-Sik	Equestrian	Eventing Individual
Silver	Gu Bon-Gil, Kim Jung-Hwan, Oh Eun-Seok, Won Woo-Young	Fencing	Men's Team Sabre
Silver	Kim Hye-Lim, Kim Keum-Hwa, Lee Ra-Jin, Lee Woo-Ri	Fencing	Women's Team Sabre
Silver	Moon Young-Hee, Kim Young-Ran, Kim Bo-Mi, Park Seon-Mi, Lee Seon-Ok, Kim Jong-Hee, Park Mi-Hyun, Kim Jong-Eun, Kim Da-Rae, Cheon Seul-Ki, Jeon Yu-Mi, Kim Sung-Hee, Jang Soo-Ji, Kim Ok-Ju, Kim Eun-Sil, Park Ki-Ju	Field hockey	Women's Team
Silver	Wang Ki-chun	Judo	Men's -73kg
Silver	Kim Jan-Di	Judo	Women's -57kg
Silver	Kim Na-Young	Judo	Women's Open category
Silver	Lee Choon-Hwan	Modern pentathlon	Men's Individual
Silver	Yang Soo-Jin, Kim Eun-Byeol, Mun Ye-Rin, Choi Min-Ji	Modern pentathlon	Women's Team
Silver	Choi Kwang-Ho	Roller sports	Men's 10000m Points+Elimination
Silver	An Yi-Seul	Roller sports	Women's 500m Sprint Race
Silver	Shin Yeong-Eun	Rowing	Women's Single Sculls
Silver	Ji Yoo-Jin	Rowing	Women's Lightweight Single Sculls
Silver	Lee Eun-Hye, Kim Ka-Yeong, Ra Hye-Mi, Kim A-Reum	Rowing	Women's Four
Silver	Lee Sang-Min, Yang Ho-Yeob	Sailing	Men's Double Handed Dinghy 420
Silver	Jun Joo-Hyun, Jeong Kwon	Sailing	Open Hobie-16
Silver	Lee Gyu-Nam, Lee Jun-Ho, Jeong Won-Deok	Sepaktakraw	Men's Double
Silver	Jin Jong-oh	Shooting	Men's 50m Pistol
Silver	Kim Jong-Hyun	Shooting	Men's 50m Rifle 3 Positions
Silver	Cha Sang-Jun, Hong Seong-Hwan, Hwang Yoon-Sam	Shooting	Men's 25m Rapid Fire Pistol Team
Silver	Hong Seong-Hwan, Jang Dae-Kyu, Park Byung-Taek	Shooting	Men's 25m Center Fire Pistol Team
Silver	Kim Min-Ji	Shooting	Women's Skeet
Silver	Kwon Na-Ra, Lee Yun-Chae, Na Yoon-Kyung	Shooting	Women's 50m Rifle 3 Positions Team
Silver	Kang Ji-Eun, Kim Mi-Jin, Lee Bo-Na	Shooting	Women's Double Trap Team
Silver	Kim Ae-Kyun, Kim Min-Ji, Kwak Yu-Hyun	Shooting	Women's Skeet Team
Silver	Bae Hwan-Sung	Soft tennis	Men's Singles
Silver	Kim Ae-Kyung	Soft tennis	Women's Singles
Silver	Bae Hwan-Sung, Kim Tae-Jung	Soft tennis	Men's Doubles
Silver	Joo Og, Kim Ae-Kyung	Soft tennis	Women's Doubles
Silver	Jeong Young-Sik, Joo Se-Hyuk, Kim Min-Seok, Lee Jung-Woo, Oh Sang-Eun	Table tennis	Men's Team
Silver	Kim Seong-ho	Taekwondo	Men's -54kg
Silver	Jang Se-Wook	Taekwondo	Men's -68kg
Silver	Park Yong-Hyun	Taekwondo	Men's -87kg
Silver	Oh Jung-A	Taekwondo	Women's +73kg
Silver	Oh Ji-Young, Kim Sa-nee, Nam Jie-youn, Yim Myung-Ok, Kim Yeon-koung, Han Yoo-Mi, Han Song-Yi, Jung Dae-Young, Hwang Youn-Joo, Kim Se-Young, Lee So-Ra, Yang Hyo-Jin	Volleyball	Women's Team
Silver	Jeon Sang-Keun	Weightlifting	Men's +105kg
Silver	Kim Soo-Kyung	Weightlifting	Women's –63kg
Silver	Jung Ji-Hyun	wrestling	Men's Greco-Roman 60kg
Silver	Lee Se-Yeol	wrestling	Men's Greco-Roman 84kg
Silver	Lee Jae-Sung	wrestling	Men's Freestyle 84kg
Silver	Lee Jong-Chan	Wushu	Men's Daoshu\Gunshu All-Round
Silver	Kim Jun-Yul	Wushu	Men's Sanshou 60kg

==== Bronze medal ====
Medal	Name	Sport	Event
Bronze	Park Tae-Kyong	Athletics	Men's 110m Hurdles
Bronze	Kim Hyun-Sub	Athletics	Men's 20km Race Walking
Bronze	Lee Mi-Young	Athletics	Women's Shot Put
Bronze	Park Sung-hwan	Badminton	Men's Singles
Bronze	Jung Jae-sung, Lee Yong-dae	Badminton	Men's Doubles
Bronze	Ha Jung-eun, Lee Kyung-won	Badminton	Women's Doubles
Bronze	Kim Min-jung, Lee Hyo-jung	Badminton	Women's Doubles
Bronze	Park Sung-Hee, Sung Ji-Hyun, Bae Youn-joo, Lee Kyung-won, Lee Hyo-jung, Kim Min-jung, Ha Jung-eun, Yoo Hyeon-yeong, Chang Ye-na, Hwang Hye-Yeon	Badminton	Women's Team
Bronze	Choi Bok-Eum	Bowling	Men's All Events
Bronze	Choi Jin-A	Bowling	Women's Masters
Bronze	Han Soon-Chul	Boxing	Men's 60kg
Bronze	Seong Su-Yeon	Boxing	Women's 69-75kg
Bronze	Jeong Young-Hwa	Cue sports	Men's 9-Ball Pool Singles
Bronze	Jo Sang-Hyo, Lee Se-Hee	Dancesport	Standard – Waltz
Bronze	Kim Hye-In, Lee Sang-Min	Dancesport	Standard – Quickstep
Bronze	Kim Dae-Dong, Yoo Hae-Sook	Dancesport	Latin Five Dances Competition
Bronze	Park Ji-Ho, Son Seong-Cheol	Diving	Men's Synchronised 3m Springboard
Bronze	Kwon Tae-Jin, Park Kyu, Park Min-Ho, Lee Hyun-Woo, Kim Seon-Ho, Yang Byung-Doo, im Yu-Ho, Park Jeong-Hoon, Kim Chang-Soo, Park Ho-Gi, Park Jeong-Keun, Hyun Jae-Chan, Sim Dae-Seob, Oh Byung-Hoon, Gu Ja-Uk, Kim Hyun-Soo, Byeon Hong-Kyun, Shin Heon-Sub, Lee Byung-Tak, Jeong Seung-Gyun, Song Myeong-Chan, Shin Yun-Gyu, Kim Yong-Hyun, Lee Seong-Won, Oh Joong-Dae, Lee Suk-Hwan	Dragon boat	Men's 1000m Straight Race
Bronze	Oh Eun-Seok	Fencing	Men's Individual Sabre
Bronze	Choi Byung-Chul, Ha Tae-Gyu, Heo Jun, Kwon Young-Ho	Fencing	Men's Team Foil
Bronze	Jeon Hee-Sook	Fencing	Women's Individual Foil
Bronze	Kim Keum-Hwa	Fencing	Women's Individual Sabre
Bronze	Jung Hyo-Jung, Oh Yun-Hee, Park Se-Ra, Shin A-Lam	Fencing	Women's Team Épée
Bronze	Kim Seung-Gyu, Hong Cheol, Shin Kwang-Hoon, Kim Young-Gwon, Hong Jeong-Ho, Yoon Suk-Young, Koo Ja-Cheol, Yoon Bit-Garam, Cho Young-Cheol, Kim Jung-Woo, Seo Jung-Jin, Kim Bo-Kyung, Park Hee-Sung, Park Chu-Young, Ji Dong-Won, Lee Beom-Young, Jang Suk-Won, Oh Jae-Seok, Kim Min-Woo, Kim Joo-Young	Football	Men's Team
Bronze	Jun Min-Kyung, Sim Seo-Yeon, Lee Eun-Mi, Kim Do-yeon, Hong Kyung-Suk, Ryu Ji-Eun, Kwon Hah-Nul, Park Eun-Jung, Park Hee-young, Ji So-Yun, Kim Su-Yeon, Moon So-ri, Jeon Ga-Eul, Kwon Eun-Som, Kim Na-Rae, Yoo Young-A, Cha Yun-Hee, Kim Hye-Ri	Football	Women's Team
Bronze	Kim Ji-Hee	Golf	Women's Individual
Bronze	Yoo Won-chul, Kim Soo-Myun, Sin Seob, Yang Hak-Seon, Kim Hee-Hoon, Kim Ji-Hoon	Gymnastics	Men's Artistic Team
Bronze	Jo Hyun-Joo	Gymnastics	Women's Floor
Bronze	Son Yeon-Jae	Gymnastics	Women's Rhythmic Individual All-Around
Bronze	Woo Sun-Hee, Kim On-A, Huh Soon-Young, Baek Seung-Hee, Bae Min-Hee, Kim Cha-Youn, Yoon Hyung-Kyung, Moon Kyeong-Ha, Ryu Eun-Hee, Nam Hyun-Hwa, Lee Min-Hee, Myoung Bok-Hee, Kang Ji-Hye, Jung Ji-Hae, Moon Pil-Hee, Lee Eun-Bi	Handball	Women's Team
Bronze	Choi Min-Ho	Judo	Men's –60kg
Bronze	Lee Kyu-Won	Judo	Men's –90kg
Bronze	Kong Ja-Young	Judo	Women's –63kg
Bronze	Chung Jung-Yeon	Judo	Women's -48 kg
Bronze	Kim Na-Young	Judo	Women's +78kg
Bronze	Lee Ji-Hwan	Karate	Men's -67 kg
Bronze	Kim Do-Won	Karate	Men's -75 kg
Bronze	Ahn Tae-Eun	Karate	Women's -55 kg
Bronze	Kim In-Hong	Modern pentathlon	Men's Individual
Bronze	Yang Soo-Jin	Modern pentathlon	Women's Individual
Bronze	Jang Soo-Chul	Roller sports	Men's 300m Time-trial Race
Bronze	Eum Han-Jun	Roller sports	Men's 500m Sprint Race
Bronze	Kim Dong-Yong, Kim Hwi-Gwan	Rowing	Men's Double Sculls
Bronze	Im Eun-Ju, Ko Young-Eun	Rowing	Women's Double Sculls
Bronze	Kim Myung-Shin, Kim Sol-Ji	Rowing	Women's Lightweight Double Sculls
Bronze	Youn Kwon-Woo, Yoon Tae-Il, Han Kun-Woo, Park Wan-Hong, Kim Won-Yong, Jegal Bin, Chun Jong-Man, Kim Hyun-Soo, Lee Jung-Min, Park Chang-Min, Kwak Chul-Woong, Yun Hee-Su	Rugby union	Men's Team
Bronze	Kim Dae-Young, Jung Sung-Ahn	Sailing	Men's Double Handed Dinghy 470
Bronze	Lee Tae-hoon	Sailing	Men's RS:X
Bronze	Park Gun-Woo, Lee Dong-Woo, Kim Sung-Wook, Cho Sung-min, Nam Yong-Jin	Sailing	Open Match Racing
Bronze	Kwon Hyuk-Jin, Woo Kyeong-Han, Park Hyeon-Geun, Go Jae-Uk, Yoo Dong-Young, Im An-Soo, Lee Gyu-Nam, Lee Jun-Ho, Kim Young-Man, Jeong Won-Deok, Sin Seung-Tae, Lee Myung-Jung	Sepaktakraw	Men's Team
Bronze	Park Keum-Duk, Ahn Soon-Ok, Kim Mi-Jin	Sepaktakraw	Women's Double
Bronze	Kim Ki-Won	Shooting	Men's 10m Air Rifle
Bronze	Lee Ho-Lim	Shooting	Women's 25m Pistol
Bronze	Jeong You-Jin	Shooting	Men's 10m Running Target
Bronze	Choi Sung-Soon, Kim Ki-Won, Kim Jong-Hyun	Shooting	Men's 10m Air Rifle Team
Bronze	Cho Se-Jong, Hwang Young-Do, Jeong You-Jin	Shooting	Men's 10m Running Target Mixed Team
Bronze	Kim Byung-Hee, Lee Ho-Lim, Park Hye-Soo	Shooting	Women's 25m Pistol Team
Bronze	Eom So-Yeon, Kang Ji-Eun, Lee Bo-Na	Shooting	Women's Trap Team
Bronze	Kim Kyung-Ryun	Soft tennis	Women's Singles
Bronze	Kim Ae-Kyung, Kim Tae-Jung	Soft tennis	Mixed Doubles
Bronze	Bae Hwan-Sung, Ji Yong-Min, Kim Tae-Jung, Lee Yeon, Lee Yo-Han	Soft tennis	Men's Team
Bronze	Joo Og, Kim Ae-Kyung, Kim Kyung-Ryun, Kwon Ran-Hee, Park Soon-Joung	Soft tennis	Women's Team
Bronze	Park Eun-Ok, Song Sun-mi, Kim Ga-Hye, Kim Jin-Hee	Squash	Women's Team
Bronze	Bae Joon-Mo, Park Seon-Kwan, Park Tae-Hwan, Kim Yong-Sik	Swimming	Men's 4 × 100 m Freestyle Relay
Bronze	Bae Joon-Mo, Jang Sng-Jin, Lee Hyun-Seung, Park Tae-Hwan, Park Min-Kyu, Kim Yong-Sik	Swimming	Men's 4 × 200 m Freestyle Relay
Bronze	Park Na-Ri, Choi Hye-Ra, Lee Jae-Young, Seo Youn-Jeong	Swimming	Women's 4 × 200 m Freestyle Relay
Bronze	Seo Youn-Jeong	Swimming	Women's 400m Freestyle
Bronze	Choi Hye-Ra	Swimming	Women's 200m Butterfly
Bronze	Choi Hye-Ra	Swimming	Women's 200m Individual Medley
Bronze	Park Hyun-Ha, Park Hyun-Sun	Synchronized swimming	Duet
Bronze	Joo Se-Hyuk	Table tennis	Men's Singles
Bronze	Jeong Young-Sik, Kim Min-Seok	Table tennis	Men's Doubles
Bronze	Kim Kyung-Ah	Table tennis	Women's Singles
Bronze	Kim Kyung-Ah, Moon Hyun-Jung, Park Mi-Young, Seok Ha-Jung, Yang Ha-Eun	Table tennis	Women's Team
Bronze	Kwon Eun-Kyung	Taekwondo	Women's -53kg
Bronze	Kang Bo-Hyeon	Taekwondo	Women's -67kg
Bronze	Cho Soong-Jae, Kim Hyun-Joon	Tennis	Men's Doubles
Bronze	Kim So-Jung, Lee Jin-A	Tennis	Women's Doubles
Bronze	Jang Yun-Jeong	Triathlon	Women's Individual
Bronze	Shin Young-Soo, Han Sun-Soo, Kwon Young-Min, Moon Sung-Min, Yeo Oh-Hyun, Kim Hak-Min, Kim Yo-han, Ko Hee-Jin, Park Chul-Woo, Suk Jin-Wook, Ha Hyun-Yong, Shin Young-Suk	Volleyball	Men's Team
Bronze	Kim Kwang-Hoon	Weightlifting	Men's 85 kg
Bronze	Kim Min-Jae	Weightlifting	Men's 94 kg
Bronze	Choi Cheol-han, Kim Yoon-Yeong	Weiqi	Mixed Doubles
Bronze	Park Jin-Sung	wrestling	Men's Greco-Roman 74 kg
Bronze	An Chang-Gun	wrestling	Men's Greco-Roman 96 kg
Bronze	Kim Hyo-Sub	wrestling	Men's Freestyle 55 kg
Bronze	Lee Yun-Seok	wrestling	Men's Freestyle 74 kg
Bronze	Kim Hyung-Joo	wrestling	Women's Freestyle 48 kg
Bronze	Park Sang-Eun	wrestling	Women's Freestyle 63 kg
Bronze	Hyun Chang-Ho	Wushu	Men's Sanshou 65kg
Bronze	Lee Jung-Hee	Wushu	Women's Sanshou 52kg

== Archery ==
=== Men ===
Athlete	Event	Qualification Round		Round of 64	Round of 32	Round of 16	Quarterfinals	Semifinals	Final
Athlete	Event	Score	Seed	Opposition Score	Opposition Score	Opposition Score	Opposition Score	Opposition Score	Opposition Score
Kim Woo-Jin	Individual	1387	1st Q	BYE	Hoang Ngoc Nhat (VIE); W 4-0 (57-50, 57-49)	Jantsangiin Gantugs (MGL); W 6-4 (29-28, 28-29, 27-28, 28-25, 29-27)	Ryota Amano (JPN); W 6-0 (30-29, 29-28, 30-26)	Xing Yu (CHN); W 6-2 (28-28, 29-29, 29-27, 29-27)	Tarundeep Rai (IND); W 7-3 (28-28, 28-27, 28-29, 28-27, 29-27) (gold)
Oh Jin-Hyuk	Individual	1366	2nd Q	BYE	Lakmal Rajasinghe (SRI); W 4-0 (54-53, 55-51)	Mohd Izzudin Abdul Rahim (MAS); W 7-3 (26-29, 28-28, 27-25, 30-27, 30-28)	Tarundeep Rai (IND); L 4-6 (27-26, 26-30, 28-28, 27-29, 28-28)	did not advance	
Im Dong-Hyun	Individual	1361	3rd	did not advance					
Lee Chang-Hwan	Individual	1355	4th	did not advance					
Im Dong-Hyun; Lee Chang-Hwan; Kim Woo-Jin; Oh Jin-Hyuk	Team	4114	1st			Qatar (QAT); W 226-196	Thailand (THA); W 229-208	India (IND); W 222-216	China (CHN); W 222-218 (gold)

=== Women ===
Athlete	Event	Qualification Round		Round of 32	Round of 16	Quarterfinals	Semifinals	Final
Athlete	Event	Score	Seed	Opposition Score	Opposition Score	Opposition Score	Opposition Score	Opposition Score
Yun Ok-hee	Individual	1371	1st Q	BYE	Urantungalag Bishindeegiin (MGL); W 6-0 (27-21, 29-27, 28-23)	Farida Tukebayeva (KAZ); W 7-3 (26-28, 29-28, 28-28, 29-27, 29-27)	Deepika Kumari (IND); W 6-2 (27-24, 28-27, 27-29, 30-29)	Cheng Ming (CHN); W 6-0 (27-25, 28-27, 28-27) (gold)
Ki Bo-Bae	Individual	1368	2nd Q	BYE	Nguyen Thi Huong (VIE); W 6-0 (28-26, 26-21, 30-25)	Cheng Ming (CHN); L 4-6 (28-28, 28-28, 29-30, 28-28, 27-27)	did not advance	
Joo Hyun-Jung	Individual	1348	4th	did not advance				
Kim Mun-Jeong	Individual	1338	5th	did not advance				
Joo Hyun-Jung; Ki Bo-Bae; Kim Mun-Jeong; Yun Ok-hee	Team	4087	1st Q		BYE	Mongolia (MGL); W 227-192	India (IND); W 221^{+29}-221 ^{+26}	China (CHN); W 220^{+58}-220^{+55}

== Athletics ==
=== Men ===
Track events

Event	Athletes	Heats		Semifinal		Final	
Event	Athletes	Result	Rank	Result	Rank	Result	Rank
100 m	Kim Kuk-Young	10.58	4th Q	10.51	5th	did not advance	
100 m	Lim Hee-Nam	10.64	1st Q	10.46	5th	did not advance	
200 m	Jeon Deok-Hyung	21.09	2nd Q			21.02	5th
200 m	Yeo Hosua	DNS				did not advance	
400 m	Choi Myung-Jun	48.09	5th			did not advance	
400 m	Lim Chan-Ho	47.06	5th			did not advance	
5000 m	Baek Seung-Ho					13:56.18 PB	7th
10000 m	Baek Seung-Ho					28:52.39 PB	5th
110 m hurdles	Park Tae-Kyong	13.68	2nd Q			13.48 NR	3rd place, bronze medalist(s)
400 m hurdles	Lee Seung-Yoon	53.56	4th			did not advance	
4 × 100 m relay	Jeon Deok-Hyung; Kim Kuk-Young; Lim Hee-Nam; Yeo Hosua	DSQ				did not advance	
4 × 400 m relay	Cho Sung-Kwon; Choi Myung-Jun; Lee Seung-Yoon; Lim Chan-Ho	3:09.49 SB	4th Q			3:09.97	6th

Road events

Event	Athletes	Final	
Event	Athletes	Result	Rank
20 km walk	Kim Hyun-Sub	1:22:47	3rd place, bronze medalist(s)
20 km walk	Park Chil-Sung	DSQ	
50 km walk	Kim Dong-Young	3:53:52 PB	5th
50 km walk	Lim Jung-Hyun	3:53:24 PB	4th
Marathon	Ji Young-Jun	2:11:11	1st place, gold medalist(s)
Marathon	Kim Young-Jin	2:24:18	9th

Field events

Event	Athletes	Final	
Event	Athletes	Result	Rank
Long jump	Kim Deok-Hyeon	8.11 m. SB	1st place, gold medalist(s)
Triple jump	Kim Deok-Hyeon	16.56 m.	5th
Triple jump	Lee Kang-Min	15.54 m.	11th
Pole vault	Kim Yoo-Suk	5.30 m.	2nd place, silver medalist(s)
Pole vault	Yoon Dae-Wook	4.80 m.	7th
Shot put	Hwang In-Sung	17.87 m.	8th
Shot put	Jung Il-Woo	16.94 m.	9th
Discus throw	Choi Jongbum	54.73 m.	8th
Javelin throw	Park Jaem-Young	79.92 m.	2nd place, silver medalist(s)
Javelin throw	Jung Sang-Jin	71.59 m.	9th
Hammer throw	Lee Yun-Chul	67.55 m.	6th

Combined events

Decathlon
Event	Kim Kun-Woo		
Event	Results	Points	Rank
100 m	11.05	850	6th
Long jump	7.29 m.	883	1st
Shot put	13.17 m.	678	7th
High jump	1.91 m.	723	7th
400 m	48.46	887	1st
110 m hurdles	15.17	829	6th
Discus throw	38.16 m.	627	6th
Pole vault	4.80 m.	849	2nd
Javelin throw	52.52 m.	626	6th
1500 m	4:13.57	856	1st
Final Total		7808	2nd place, silver medalist(s)

=== Women ===
Track events

Event	Athletes	Heats		Semifinal		Final	
Event	Athletes	Result	Rank	Result	Rank	Result	Rank
800 m	Huh Yeon-Jung	2:07.99	4th			did not advance	
100 m hurdles	Jung Hye-Lim	13.57	4th			did not advance	
100 m hurdles	Lee Yeon-Kyung	13.22	3rd Q			13.23	1st place, gold medalist(s)

Road events

Event	Athletes		
Event	Athletes	Final	
Event	Athletes	Result	Rank
20 km walk	Jeon Yeong-Eun	1:40:24	5th
Marathon	Lee Sun-Young	2:39:37	9th
Marathon	Lim Kyung-Hee	DNF	

Field events

Event	Athletes	Final	
Event	Athletes	Result	Rank
Long jump	Jung Soon-Ok	6.53 m. SB	1st place, gold medalist(s)
Triple jump	Jung Hye-Kyung	13.25 m.	7th
Pole vault	Choi Yun-Hee	4.15	4th
Shot put	Lee Mi-Young	17.51 m. SB	3rd place, bronze medalist(s)
Javelin throw	Kim Gyeong-Ae	56.84 m.	4th
Javelin throw	Seo Hae-An	55.21 m.	6th
Hammer throw	Kang Na-Ru	56.85 m.	5th
Hammer throw	Park Hee-Seon	57.53 m.	6th

Combined events

Heptathlon
Event	Lee Eun-Im		
Event	Results	Points	Rank
100 m hurdles	14.55	902	4th
High jump	1.65 m.	795	6th
Shot put	10.09	535	6th
200 m	27.05	708	6th
Long jump	5.62 m.	735	4th
Javelin throw	32.79 m.	530	5th
800 m	2:30.91	682	4th
Final Total		4887	5th

== Badminton ==
Men

Athlete	Event	Round of 32	Round of 16	Quarterfinals	Semifinals	Final	
Athlete	Event	Opposition Score	Opposition Score	Opposition Score	Opposition Score	Opposition Score	Rank
Lee Hyun-il	Singles	Tamrakar (NEP); W 2-0	Chen (CHN); L 0-2	did not advance			
Park Sung-hwan	Singles	Tago (JPN); W 2-0	Hashim (MAS); W 2-0	Hidayat (INA); W 2-0	Lin (CHN); L 0-2	did not advance	3rd place, bronze medalist(s)
Jung Jae-sung; Lee Yong-dae	Doubles	Bye	Dewalkar and Vishnu (IND); W 2-0	Cai and Fu (CHN); W 2-0	Kido and Setiawan (INA); L 1-2	did not advance	3rd place, bronze medalist(s)
Ko Sung-hyun; Yoo Yong-sung	Doubles	Bye	Hashimoto and Hirata (JPN); L 0-2	did not advance			
Lee Hyun-il; Park Sung-hwan; Jung Jae-sung; Lee Yong-dae; Ko Sung-hyun; Yoo Yong-sung	Team		Bye	Malaysia (MAS); W 3-0	Thailand (THA); W 3-1	China (CHN); L 1-3	2nd place, silver medalist(s)

Women

Athlete	Event	Round of 32	Round of 16	Quarterfinals	Semifinals	Final	
Athlete	Event	Opposition Score	Opposition Score	Opposition Score	Opposition Score	Opposition Score	Rank
Bae Youn-joo	Singles	Bye	Chan (HKG); W 2-0	Wang (CHN); L 0-2	did not advance		
Sung Ji-hyun	Singles	Mak (MAC); W 2-0	Goto (JPN); L 0-2	did not advance			
Ha Jung-eun; Lee Kyung-won	Doubles	Bye	Poauleng and Woon (MAS); W 2-0	Maeda and Suetsuna (JPN); W 2-1	Wang and Yu (CHN); L 0-2	did not advance	3rd place, bronze medalist(s)
Kim Min-jung; Lee Hyo-jung	Doubles	Shrestha and Tamang (NEP); W 2-0	Fujii and Kakiita (JPN); W 2-0	Hsieh and Wang (TPE); W 2-0	Tian and Zhao (CHN); L 0-2	did not advance	3rd place, bronze medalist(s)
Bae Youn-joo; Sung Ji-hyun; Ha Jung-eun; Lee Kyung-won; Kim Min-jung; Lee Hyo-jung	Team		Bye	Japan (JPN); W 3-1	China (CHN); L 0-3	None	3rd place, bronze medalist(s)

Mixed

Athlete	Event	Round of 32	Round of 16	Quarterfinals	Semifinals	Final	
Athlete	Event	Opposition Score	Opposition Score	Opposition Score	Opposition Score	Opposition Score	Rank
Ha Jung-eun; Ko Sung-hyun	Doubles	Bye	Shrestha and Tamang (NEP); W 2-1	Zhang and Zhao (CHN); L 1-2	did not advance		
Lee Hyo-jung; Shin Baek-cheol	Doubles	Chan and Goh (MAS); W 2-0	Diju and Gutta (IND); W 2-1	Anugritayawon and Voravichitchaikul (THA); W 2-0	He and Ma (CHN); W 2-1	Zhang and Zhao (CHN); W 2-0	1st place, gold medalist(s)

== Beach volleyball ==
=== Men ===
Athlete	Event	Preliminary Round			Round of 16	Quarterfinals	Semifinals	Finals
Athlete	Event	Opposition Score	Opposition Score	Opposition Score	Opposition Score	Opposition Score	Opposition Score	Opposition Score
An Tae-Young; Kwon Yong-Seok	Men's beach volleyball	Alexandr Dyachenko (KAZ) and Alexey Sidorenko (KAZ); L 0-2 (10-21, 9-21)	Wong Chun Wai (HKG) and Wong Kwun Pong (HKG); L 0-2 (18-21, 16-21)		did not advance			
Lee Gwang-In; Ko Jun-Yong	Men's beach volleyball	Khalifa Al-Jabri (OMA) and Abdullah Al-Rajhi (OMA); L 0-2 (12-21, 12-21)	Dian Putra Santoso (INA) and Ade Candra Rachmawan (INA); L 1-2 (21-15, 15-21, 15-9)	Mahesh Perera (SRI) and Wasantha Rathnapala (SRI); L 0-2 (8-21, 11-21)	did not advance			

=== Women ===
Athlete	Event	Preliminary Round			Round of 16	Quarterfinals	Semifinals	Finals
Athlete	Event	Opposition Score	Opposition Score	Opposition Score	Opposition Score	Opposition Score	Opposition Score	Opposition Score
Lee Hyun-Jung; Lee Eun-A	Women's beach volleyball	Xue Chen (CHN) and Zhang Xi (CHN); L 0-2 (7-21, 9-21)	Lyudmila Issayeva (KAZ) and Inna Rakhmatulina (KAZ); L 0-2 (16-21, 19-21)	Tse Wing Hung (HKG) and Kong Cheuk Yee (HKG); L 1-2 (21-19, 17-21, 15-10)	Usa Tenpaksee (THA) and Jarunee Sannok (THA); L 0-2 (11-21, 12-21)	did not advance		
Lee Sun-Hwa; Kwak Mi-Jung	Women's beach volleyball	Tatyana Mashkova (KAZ) and Irina Tsimbalova (KAZ); L 0-2 (8-21, 6-21)	Usa Tenpaksee (THA) and Jarunee Sannok (THA); L 0-2 (11-21, 14-21)	Geethika Gunawardena (SRI) and Sujeewa Wijesinghe (SRI); L 1-2 (15-21, 21-19, 15-13)	Xue Chen (CHN) and Zhang Xi (CHN); L 0-2 (7-21, 7-21)	did not advance		

== Baseball ==
=== Men ===
- Pitchers : Ahn Ji-Man, Bong Jung-Keun, Chong Tae-Hyon, Im Tae-Hoon, Ko Chang-Sung, Kim Myung-Sung, Ryu Hyun-Jin, Song Eun-Beom, Yang Hyeon-Jong, Yoon Suk-Min
- Catchers : Kang Min-Ho, Park Kyung-Oan
- Infielders : Cho Dong-Chan, Choi Jeong, Jeong Keun-Woo, Kang Jung-Ho, Kim Tae-Kyun, Lee Dae-Ho, Son Si-Hyun
- Outfielders : Choo Shin-Soo, Hyun-soo Kim, Kim Kang-Min, Lee Jong-Wook, Lee Yong-Kyu
- Manager : Cho Beom-Hyeon
- Coaches : Cho Chung-Hee, Kim Joon-Bae, Kim Si-Jin, Ryu Joong-Il, Yoon Young-Hwan

Preliminary round

Group B

Pos	Team	Pld	W	L	RF	RA	PCT	GB	Qualification
1	South Korea	3	3	0	38	1	1.000	—	Semifinals
2	Chinese Taipei	3	2	1	28	7	.667	1	Semifinals
3	Pakistan	3	1	2	6	31	.333	2	
4	Hong Kong	3	0	3	3	36	.000	3	

Source: Results

November 13 18:00 at Aoti Baseball Field, Guangzhou
Team	1	2	3	4	5	6	7	8	9	R	H	E
Chinese Taipei	0	0	0	0	0	1	0	0	0	1	7	1
South Korea	2	0	2	0	0	2	0	0	X	6	10	0
WP: Ryu Hyun-Jin LP: Lin Yi-hao; Home runs: TPE: None; KOR: Choo Shin-Soo (2); Attendance: 665

November 14 18:00 at Aoti Baseball Field, Guangzhou
Team	1	2	3	4	5	6	7	8	9	R	H	E
Hong Kong	0	0	0	0	0	0	X	X	X	0	3	2
South Korea	0	3	0	2	4	6	X	X	X	15	12	0
WP: Im Tae-Hoon LP: Duncan Chau; Home runs: HKG: None; KOR: Kang Jung-Ho (1); Attendance: 400

November 16 12:00 at Aoti Baseball Field, Guangzhou
Team	1	2	3	4	5	6	7	8	9	R	H	E
South Korea	3	4	1	0	9	X	X	X	X	17	15	1
Pakistan	0	0	0	0	0	X	X	X	X	0	2	4
WP: Kim Myung-Sung LP: Saleem Haider; Attendance: 450

Semifinals

November 18 12:00 at Aoti Baseball Field, Guangzhou
Team	1	2	3	4	5	6	7	8	9	R	H	E
China	0	0	1	0	0	0	0	0	0	1	4	1
South Korea	0	2	1	0	3	0	1	0	X	7	10	0
WP: Yang Hyeon-Jong LP: Lu Jiangang; Home runs: CHN: None; KOR: Choo Shin-Soo (1); Attendance: 1,350

Gold-medal match

November 19 18:00 at Aoti Baseball Field, Guangzhou
Team	1	2	3	4	5	6	7	8	9	R	H	E
South Korea	1	1	4	0	0	0	1	0	2	9	17	2
Chinese Taipei	1	0	0	2	0	0	0	0	0	3	8	1
WP: Yoon Suk-Min LP: Pan Wei-lun; Home runs: KOR: Lee Dae-Ho (1), Kang Jung-Ho (2); TPE: None; Attendance: 3,500

==== Baseball Roster ====
- Pitchers : Ahn Ji-Man, Bong Jung-Keun, Chong Tae-Hyon, Im Tae-Hoon, Ko Chang-Sung, Kim Myung-Sung, Ryu Hyun-Jin, Song Eun-Beom, Yang Hyeon-Jong, Yoon Suk-Min
- Catchers : Kang Min-Ho, Park Kyung-Oan
- Infielders : Cho Dong-Chan, Choi Jeong, Jeong Keun-Woo, Kang Jung-Ho, Kim Tae-Kyun, Lee Dae-Ho, Son Si-Hyun
- Outfielders : Choo Shin-Soo, Hyun-soo Kim, Kim Kang-Min, Lee Jong-Wook, Lee Yong-Kyu
- Manager : Cho Beom-Hyeon
- Coaches : Cho Chung-Hee, Kim Joon-Bae, Kim Si-Jin, Ryu Joong-Il, Yoon Young-Hwan

== Basketball ==
=== Men ===
Team

- Guard : Park Chan-Hee, Lee Jung-Suk, Yang Dong-Geun
- Forward : Lee Kyu-sup, Cho Sung-min, Yang Hee-Jong, Kim Sung-Chul
- Center : Kim Joo-Sung, Ha Seung-Jin, Ham Ji-hoon, Lee Seung-Jun, Oh Se-Keun
- Coach : Yoo Jae-Hak
- Assistant coach : Kim Yoo-Taek

Preliminary round

Group E

Team	Pld	W	L	PF	PA	PD	Pts
China	5	5	0	462	258	+204	10
South Korea	5	4	1	475	311	+164	9
Jordan	5	3	2	339	403	−64	8
North Korea	5	2	3	377	421	−44	7
Mongolia	5	1	4	310	438	−128	6
Uzbekistan	5	0	5	283	415	−132	5

November 16
19:15

South Korea	103–54	Uzbekistan
Scoring by quarter: 25–11, 21–13, 28–16, 29–14
Pts: Lee S.J. 20; Rebs: Lee S.J. 8 Asts: Yang D.G. 4		Pts: Juginisov 27; Rebs: Juginisov 9 Asts: Gusev, Sharafutdinov 2

Ying Dong Gymnasium, Guangzhou
Referees: Ferdinand Pascual (PHI), Andy Cheung (HKG), Wu Ying-wei (TPE)

November 17
21:30

South Korea	95–49	Jordan
Scoring by quarter: 28–16, 25–12, 20–12, 22–9
Pts: Kim J.S., Lee S.J. 14; Rebs: Oh S.K. 8 Asts: Park C.H. 7		Pts: Hadrab 19; Rebs: Zaghab 6 Asts: 5 Players 1

International Sports Arena, Guangzhou
Referees: Eddie Viator (FRA), Yasser Abbas (QAT), Ferdinand Pascual (PHI)

November 19
21:30

North Korea	66–96	South Korea
Scoring by quarter: 12–27, 18–28, 15–25, 21–16
Pts: Pak U.C. 20; Rebs: Pak U.C., Kim U.C. 3 Asts: Pak U.C. 4		Pts: Cho S.M. 15; Rebs: Lee S.J. 7 Asts: Yang H.J., Kim S.C. 3

International Sports Arena, Guangzhou
Referees: Pablo Estevez (ARG), Wu Ying-wei (TPE), Amir Hossein Safarzadeh (IRI)

November 21
19:15

South Korea	66–76	China
Scoring by quarter: 22–19, 13–19, 18–21, 13–17
Pts: Kim J.S. 18; Rebs: Yang H.J. 7 Asts: Yang D.G. 7		Pts: Sun Y. 19; Rebs: Wang Z.Z. 7 Asts: Sun Y. 3

International Sports Arena, Guangzhou
Referees: Cristiano Maranho (BRA), Amir Hossein Safarzadeh (IRI), Ferdinand Pascual (PHI)

November 22
21:30

Mongolia	66–115	South Korea
Scoring by quarter: 18–29, 11–29, 17–29, 20–28
Pts: Uuganbayar 27; Rebs: Uuganbayar 10; Asts: Uuganbayar 3		Pts: Park C.H., Oh S.K. 16; Rebs: Lee S.J. 9 Asts: Ham J.H. 9

International Sports Arena, Guangzhou
Referees: Amir Hossein Safarzadeh (IRI), Ramesh Kumar (IND), Naohiko Uchihara (JPN)

Quarterfinals

November 24
13:15

South Korea	74–66	Philippines
Scoring by quarter: 21–19, 23–17, 17–15, 13–15
Pts: Kim S.C. 13; Rebs: Oh S.K. 9 Asts: 4 Players 3		Pts: Taulava 23; Rebs: Williams 8 Asts: Casio 4

Huangpu Gymnasium, Guangzhou
Referees: Cristiano Maranho (BRA), Andy Cheung (HKG), Song Xiaojing (CHN)

Semifinals

November 25
13:15

South Korea	55–51	Japan
Scoring by quarter: 9–14, 18–12, 19–12, 9–13
Pts: Kim J.S. 13; Rebs: Kim J.S. 9 Asts: Yang D.G. 4		Pts: K. Takeuchi 16; Rebs: K. Takeuchi 11; Asts: Hirose, Tabuse 4

International Sports Arena, Guangzhou
Referees: Borys Shulga (UKR), Yasser Abbas (QAT), Mohammad Al-Amiri (KUW)

Gold medal game

November 26
19:00

South Korea	71–77	China
Scoring by quarter: 21–27, 16–16, 19–21, 15–13
Pts: Yang D.G. 17; Rebs: Kim J.S., Yang H.J., Lee S.J. 4 Asts: Yang D.G., Yang H.J. 4		Pts: Wang Z.Z. 20; Rebs: Ding J.H. 8 Asts: Sun Y. 4

International Sports Arena, Guangzhou
Referees: Pablo Estevez (ARG), Cristiano Maranho (BRA), Borys Shulga (UKR)

=== Women ===
Team

- Guard : Kim Ji-Yoon, Lee Mi-Sun, Lee Kyung-Eun
- Forward : Kim Bo-Mi, Kang A-Jeong, Beon Yeon-Ha, Park Jung-Eun, Kim Dan-Bi
- Center : Jung Sun-Hwa, Ha Eun-Joo, Kim Kwe-Ryong, Sin Jung-Ja
- Coach : Lim Dal-Sik
- Assistant coach : Lee Ho-Keun

Preliminary round

Group A

Team	Pld	W	L	PF	PA	PD	Pts
China	3	3	0	277	146	+131	6
South Korea	3	2	1	255	171	+84	5
Thailand	3	1	2	160	245	−85	4
India	3	0	3	137	267	−130	3

November 18
19:15

South Korea	93–55	Thailand
Scoring by quarter: 31–10, 15–13, 26–16, 21–16
Pts: Beon Y.H. 21; Rebs: Jung S.H., Lee M.S., Park J.E. 5 Asts: Kim J.Y., Lee M.S., Kim K.R. 4		Pts: Kaichaiyapoom 11; Rebs: Kaichaiyapoom 5 Asts: Saechua 2

Ying Dong Gymnasium, Guangzhou
Referees: Nadine Crowley (CAN), Tien Hsiao-lun (TPE), Naohiko Uchihara (JPN)

November 20
19:15

India	44–98	South Korea
Scoring by quarter: 11–25, 12–17, 8–23, 13–33
Pts: Jose, Durai 13; Rebs: Jose 11; Asts: Jose 2		Pts: Kim D.B. 21; Rebs: Kim K.R., Sin J.J. 7 Asts: Beon Y.H. 9

Ying Dong Gymnasium, Guangzhou
Referees: Yoko Tomita (JPN), Liu Wei (CHN), Tien Hsiao-lun (TPE)

November 22
14:15

China	72–64	South Korea
Scoring by quarter: 21–20, 20–15, 19–17, 12–12
Pts: Chen N. 29; Rebs: Guan X. 13; Asts: Miao L.J. 5		Pts: Kim D.B. 17; Rebs: Jung S.H. 4 Asts: 4 Players 1

Huangpu Gymnasium, Guangzhou
Referees: Elena Chernova (RUS), Yoko Tomita (JPN), Yasser Abbas (QAT)

Semifinals

November 24
19:15

Japan	78–93	South Korea
Scoring by quarter: 22–24, 12–17, 27–30, 17–22
Pts: Oga 26; Rebs: Mamiya 7 Asts: Yoshida 4		Pts: Beon Y.H. 24; Rebs: Jung S.H., Lee M.S., Kim D.B. 7 Asts: Park J.E. 6

International Sports Arena, Guangzhou
Referees: Elena Chernova (RUS), Amir Hossein Safarzadeh (IRI), Ferdinand Pascual (PHI)

Gold medal game

November 25
21:30

South Korea	64–70	China
Scoring by quarter: 16–15, 12–24, 19–12, 17–19
Pts: Beon Y.H. 23; Rebs: Ha E.J. 5 Asts: Lee M.S. 6		Pts: Chen N. 17; Rebs: Chen N. 12; Asts: Miao L.J. 6

International Sports Arena, Guangzhou
Referees: Elena Chernova (RUS), Teerapong Yodsint (THA), Ramesh Kumar (IND)

== Bowling ==
=== Men ===
Athlete	Event	Games 1–6						Total	Average	Grand total	Rank
Athlete	Event	1	2	3	4	5	6	Total	Average	Grand total	Rank
Choi Yong-Kyu	Men's singles	207	259	247	245	197	215	1370	228.3		5th
Jang Dong-Chul	Men's singles	218	215	175	279	243	235	1365	227.5		7th
Choi Bok-Eum	Men's singles	227	203	209	256	258	160	1313	218.8		20th
Cho Young-Seon	Men's singles	213	185	236	258	228	192	1312	218.7		21st
Suh Sang-Cheon	Men's singles	224	225	206	207	225	195	1282	213.7		27th
Hong Hae-Sol	Men's singles	223	157	213	235	189	222	1239	206.5		41st
Jang Dong-Chul; Choi Bok-Eum	Men's doubles	178	235	175	235	180	247	1250	208.3	2683	4th
Jang Dong-Chul; Choi Bok-Eum	Men's doubles	245	268	223	207	258	232	1433	238.8	2683	4th
Choi Yong-Kyu; Cho Young-Seon	Men's doubles	192	192	224	195	259	257	1319	219.8	2602	8th
Choi Yong-Kyu; Cho Young-Seon	Men's doubles	192	226	197	234	243	191	1283	213.8	2602	8th
Suh Sang-Cheon; Hong Hae-Sol	Men's doubles	248	181	203	193	170	255	1250	208.3	2395	33rd
Suh Sang-Cheon; Hong Hae-Sol	Men's doubles	180	180	192	171	217	205	1145	190.8	2395	33rd
Choi Yong-Kyu; Jang Dong-Chul; Choi Bok-Eum	Men's trios	272	269	195	246	237	214	1433	238.8	4061	1st place, gold medalist(s)
Choi Yong-Kyu; Jang Dong-Chul; Choi Bok-Eum	Men's trios	234	248	205	191	192	237	1307	217.8	4061	1st place, gold medalist(s)
Choi Yong-Kyu; Jang Dong-Chul; Choi Bok-Eum	Men's trios	174	253	203	207	228	256	1321	220.2	4061	1st place, gold medalist(s)
Suh Sang-Cheon; Cho Young-Seon; Hong Hae-Sol	Men's trios	225	234	227	214	206	212	1318	219.7	3952	2nd place, silver medalist(s)
Suh Sang-Cheon; Cho Young-Seon; Hong Hae-Sol	Men's trios	193	225	236	221	245	159	1279	213.2	3952	2nd place, silver medalist(s)
Suh Sang-Cheon; Cho Young-Seon; Hong Hae-Sol	Men's trios	236	203	205	236	227	248	1355	225.8	3952	2nd place, silver medalist(s)
Suh Sang-Cheon; Choi Yong-Kyu; Cho Young-Seon; Choi Bok-Eum; Hong Hae-Sol	Men's team of five	179	209	199	212	203	246	1248	208.0	6654	1st place, gold medalist(s)
Suh Sang-Cheon; Choi Yong-Kyu; Cho Young-Seon; Choi Bok-Eum; Hong Hae-Sol	Men's team of five	212	189	257	246	254	180	1338	223.0	6654	1st place, gold medalist(s)
Suh Sang-Cheon; Choi Yong-Kyu; Cho Young-Seon; Choi Bok-Eum; Hong Hae-Sol	Men's team of five	186	199	232	238	227	248	1330	221.7	6654	1st place, gold medalist(s)
Suh Sang-Cheon; Choi Yong-Kyu; Cho Young-Seon; Choi Bok-Eum; Hong Hae-Sol	Men's team of five	241	206	244	211	246	216	1364	227.3	6654	1st place, gold medalist(s)
Suh Sang-Cheon; Choi Yong-Kyu; Cho Young-Seon; Choi Bok-Eum; Hong Hae-Sol	Men's team of five	237	182	236	269	207	243	1374	229.0	6654	1st place, gold medalist(s)
Jang Dong-Chul	Men's team of five booster	203	213	226	171	215	203	1231	205.2		

All events

Athlete	Event	Singles	Doubles	Trío	Team	Total	Average	Rank
Choi Yong-Kyu	Men's all events	1370	1319	1433	1319	5441	226.71	2nd place, silver medalist(s)
Choi Bok-Eum	Men's all events	1313	1433	1321	1364	54311	226.29	3rd place, bronze medalist(s)
Jang Dong-Chul	Men's all events	1365	1250	1307	1322	5244	218.50	7th
Cho Young-Seon	Men's all events	1312	1283	1279	1330	5204	216.83	12th
Hong Hae-Sol	Men's all events	1239	1145	1355	1374	5113	213.04	24th
Suh Sang-Cheon	Men's all events	1282	1250	1318	1176	5026	209.42	33rd

Masters

Athlete	Event	Block 1 (Games 1–8)								Block 2 (Games 1–8)								Grand Total	Average	Rank	Stepladder 2nd – 3rd place	Stepladder 1st – 2nd place
Athlete	Event	1	2	3	4	5	6	7	8	1	2	3	4	5	6	7	8	Grand Total	Average	Rank	Opposition score	Opposition score
Choi Bok-Eum	Men's masters	254; 10	206; 10	203; 0	249; 10	211; 0	225; 10	245; 10	200; 0	210; 10	300; 10	257; 10	224; 0	243; 10	226; 10	228; 10	222; 10	3823	231.4	1st QF		Mohammad Al-Regeebah (KUW); W 462-327 (gold)
Choi Yong-Kyu	Men's masters	216; 0	202; 10	215; 10	236; 10	266; 10	203; 10	248; 10	184; 0	257; 10	243; 10	213; 10	178; 0	231; 10	185; 0	203; 10	214; 0	3604	218.4	6th		

== Boxing ==
Men

Athlete	Event	Round of 32	Round of 16	Quarterfinals	Semifinals	Final	
Athlete	Event	Opposition Result	Opposition Result	Opposition Result	Opposition Result	Opposition Result	Rank
Shin Jong-Hun	Light flyweight	Bye	Nazari (AFG); W 13-3	Zhakypov (KAZ); L 3-17	did not advance		
Kim Ju-Seong	Flyweight	Zhakupov (KAZ); W 5-3	Singh (IND); L 6-8	did not advance			
Lee Jin-Young	Bantamweight	Moneboudsady (LAO); W 7-0	Salamana (SYR); L 3-+3	did not advance			
Han Soon-Chul	Lightweight	Bye	Talasbayev (KGZ); W 11-6	Bashenov (KAZ); W 11-8	Hu (CHN); L 7-10	did not advance	3rd place, bronze medalist(s)
Shim Hyun-Young	Light welterweight	Bye	Masuk (THA); L 5-10	did not advance			
Jeon Young-Nam	Welterweight	Bye	Maimaitituersun (CHN); L 6-16	did not advance			
Cho Deok-Jin	Middleweight	Bye	Bashirov (TKM); W 10-4	Singh (IND); L 2-13	did not advance		
Heo Jin-Ho	Light heavyweight		Bye	Kumar (IND); L 6-10	did not advance		
Jeon Chan-Yeong	Heavyweight		Mamasaliev (KGZ); W 13-2	Ghossoun (SYR); L 1-10	did not advance		
Park Sung-Keun	Super heavyweight		Bye	Samota (IND); L by RSC	did not advance		

Women

Athlete	Event	Round of 16	Quarterfinals	Semifinals	Final	
Athlete	Event	Opposition Result	Opposition Result	Opposition Result	Opposition Result	Rank
Jang Eun-A	Flyweight	Ren (CHN); L 1-8	did not advance			
Park Jin-A	Lightweight	Dong (CHN); L by RSC	did not advance			
Seong Su-Yeon	Middleweight		Bye	Undram (MGL); L 3-14	did not advance	3rd place, bronze medalist(s)

== Canoeing ==
=== Slarom ===
Athlete	Event	Heats		Semifinals		Final	
Athlete	Event	Time	Rank	Time	Rank	Time	Rank
Yoon Young-Jung	Men's K1	201.84; 128.31	6; 7	150.33	7	188.61	8

=== Sprint ===
Athlete	Event	Heats		Semifinals		Final	
Athlete	Event	Time	Rank	Time	Rank	Time	Rank
An Hyun-Jin	Men's C1 200m	45.416	5 QS	43.179	2 Q	42.601	8
Kim Tae-Eun	Men's C1 1000m	4:15.908	1 Q	–		4:08.864	6
Seo Tae-Won	Men's K1 200m	40.873	4 QS	40.223	4	did not advance	
Seo Tae-Won	Men's K1 1000m	3:50.354	4 QS	3:50.060	1 Q	3:52.619	8
Moon Chul-Wook; Kim Yong-Kyo	Men's K2 200m	36.836	3 Q	–		35.948	7
Kim Young-Hwan; Nam Sung-Ho	Men's K2 1000m	3:29.575	5 QS	3:31.541	2 Q	3:28.334	8
Kim Dae-Jin; Kim Yong-Kyo; Moon Chul-Wook; Seo Tae-Won	Men's K4 1000m	3:07.676	3 Q	–		3:08.153	6
Yoo Mi-Na	Women's K1 200m	46.325	4 QS	45.071	1 Q	45.480	8
Shin Jin-Ah	Women's K1 500m	1:59.243	3 Q	–		2:04.239	8
Yoo Mi-Na; Shin Jin-Ah	Women's K2 500m	1:52.487	2 Q	–		1:50.631	5

== Cue Sports ==
Athlete	Event	Round of 64	Round of 32	Round of 16	Quarterfinals	Semifinals	Final
Athlete	Event	Opposition Result	Opposition Result	Opposition Result	Opposition Result	Opposition Result	Opposition Result
Heo Jung-Han	Men's Carom 3 Cushion Singles			Vijay Goel (IND); W 40-5	The Vinh Ly (VIE); L 35-40	did not advance	
Kim Kyung-Roul	Men's Carom 3 Cushion Singles			Joji Kai (JPN); L 39-40	did not advance		
Hwang Chul-Ho	Men's English Billiards Singles		BYE	Haitham Shikh Khalil (SYR); W 3-0	Kyaw Oo Oo (MYA); L 0-3	did not advance	
Baek Min-Hu	Men's English Billiards Singles		BYE	Omar Alkojah (SYR); W 3-0	Peter Gilchrist (SIN); L 0-3	did not advance	
Jeong Young-Hwa	Men's Eight-ball Singles	Omar Alshaheen (KUW); L 3-7	did not advance				
Lee Kang	Men's Eight-ball Singles	Keng Kwang Chan (SIN); W 7-5	Kuo Po-cheng (TPE); L 4-7	did not advance			
Jeong Young-Hwa	Men's Nine-ball singles		Chang Jung-Lin (TPE); W 9-7	Nitiwat Kanjanasri (THA); W 9-5	Fu Jianbo (CHN); W 9-6	Dennis Orcollo (PHI); L 3-9 (bronze)	did not advance
Lee Kang	Men's Nine-ball singles		Baabad (KSA); L 8-9	did not advance			
Hwang Chul-Ho	Men's Snooker singles		Dechawat Poomjaeng (THA); L 0-4	did not advance			
Baek Min-Hu	Men's Snooker singles		Ali Ali (IRQ); W by w/o	Thor Chuan Leong (MAS); L 1-4	did not advance		
Jung Tae-Hoon; Hwang Chul-Ho	Men's Snooker team			Ali Nasser Al-Obaidli and Nisar Ahmed Safuddin (QAT); L 1-3	did not advance		
Cha You-Ram	Women's Eight-ball Singles		Suhana Dewi Sabtu (MAS); W 5-3	Chonticha Chitchomnart (THA); W 5-1	Liu Shasha (CHN); L 4-5	did not advance	
Kim Ga-Young	Women's Eight-ball Singles		BYE	Rubilen Amit (PHI); W 5-2	Charlene Chai (SIN); W 5-2	Chou Chieh-yu (TPE); W 5-2	Liu Shasha (CHN); L 4-5 (silver)
Cha You-Ram	Women's Nine-ball Singles		Suhana Dewi Sabtu (MAS); W 7-3	Amenh Almsyleem (KUW); W 7-2	Pan Xiaoting (CHN); L 6-7	did not advance	
Kim Ga-Young	Women's Nine-ball Singles		Meenal Thakur (IND); W 7-2	Esther Kwan Suet Yee (MAS); W 7-3	Chou Chieh-yu (TPE); L 4-7	did not advance	
Lim Yun-Mi	Women's Six Red Snooker Singles		BYE	Zeet Chai (SIN); W 4-3	Yee Ng On (HKG); L 1-4	did not advance	
Cha Bo-Ram	Women's Six Red Snooker Singles	BYE	Mary Ann Basas (PHI); W 4-3	Zhuqing Bi (CHN); L 1-4	did not advance		
Lim Yun-Mi; Cha Bo-Ram	Women's Six Red Snooker Team			BYE	Nicha Pathom-Ekmongkhon and Suweenut Maungin (THA); L 0-3	did not advance	

== Cycling ==
=== BMX ===
Athlete	Event	Qualifying		Final	
Athlete	Event	Time	Rank	Time	Rank
Jang Jae-Youn	Men's individual	39.535; 38.839; 40.337	5; 5; 5	did not advance	
Suh Ik-Joon	Men's individual	41.989; 44.336; 41.251	5; 5; 5	did not advance	

=== Mountain biking ===
Athlete	Event	Time	Rank
Choi Jin-Yong	Men's cross-country	2:24:13.97	5
Na Sang-Hoon	Men's cross-country	-4 lap	7
Choi Hye-Kyeong	Women's cross-country	2:05:13.81	4

=== Road ===
Athlete	Event	Time	Rank
Jang Kyung-Gu	Men's road race	4:14:57.23	13
Park Sung-Baek	Men's road race	Relegated	19
Choi Hyeong-Min	Men's time trial	1:08:16.12	1st place, gold medalist(s)
Yoo Ji-Na	Women's road race	2:47:46.86	5
Na A-Reum	Women's road race	2:47:46.99	6
Lee Min-Hye	Women's time trial	49:38.35	1st place, gold medalist(s)

=== Track ===
Sprints

Athlete	Event	Qualifying		1/16 Finals (Repechage)	1/8 Finals (Repechage)	Quarterfinals	Semifinals	Final	
Athlete	Event	Time Speed (km/h)	Rank	Opposition Time Speed	Opposition Time Speed	Opposition Time Speed	Opposition Time Speed	Opposition Time Speed	Rank
Choi Lae-Seon	Men's sprint	10.546; 68.272	8 Q	Shambih (UAE); W 11.558; 62.294	Feng (CHN); W 10.999; 65.460	Nitta (JPN); L Sprint Race 5th-8th L	did not advance		6
Son Gyeong-Su	Men's sprint	10.814; 66.580	10 Q	Farsinejadian (IRI); L, W 11.112; 64.794	Awang (MAS); L, L Sprint Race 9th-12th W 11.460; 62.827	did not advance			9
Son Gyeong-Su; Kim Woo-Yeong; Choi Lae-Seon	Men's team sprint	46.206; 58.433	5					did not advance	
Lee Eun-Ji	Women's sprint	11.588; 62.133	4 Q		Mustapa (MAS); L, W 12.533; 57.448	Meng (HKG); L DNF; Sprint Race 5th-8th W 12.696; 56.710	did not advance		5
Kim Won-Gyeong	Women's sprint	11.600; 62.068	5 Q		Meng (HKG); W 12.352; 58.290	Mustapa (MAS); W 12.197/11.946	Guo (CHN); L	Lee (HKG); L	4

Pursuits

Athlete	Event	Qualifying		1st Round	Finals	
Athlete	Event	Time	Rank	Opposition Time	Opposition Time	Rank
Jang Sun-jae	Men's individual pursuit	4:27.992 AR	1 Q	Hwang (KOR); W 4:26.089 AR	Cheung (HKG); W 4:30.298	1st place, gold medalist(s)
Hwang In-Hyeok	Men's individual pursuit	4:37.862	8 Q	Jang (KOR); L Overlapped	did not advance	
Park Seon-Ho; Jang Sun-jae; Cho Ho-Sung; Hwang In-Hyeok	Men's team pursuit	4:14.319	2 Q	Chinese Taipei (TPE); W 4:06.598 AR	Hong Kong (HKG); W 4:07.875	1st place, gold medalist(s)
Na A-Reum	Women's individual pursuit	3:43.823	2 Q	Tseng (TPE); W 3:45.346	Wu (CHN); L 3:48.658	4
Lee Min-Hye	Women's individual pursuit	3:44.649	3 Q	Wong (HKG); W 3:39.768	Jiang (CHN); L 3:40.330	2nd place, silver medalist(s)

Keirin

Athlete	Event	Round 1	Repechage	Round 2	Finals
Athlete	Event	Rank	Rank	Rank	Rank
Choi Lae-Seon	Men's keirin	3 Q	–	4 q	11
Jeon Won-Gu	Men's keirin	5 QR	2 Q	4 q	12

Point race

Athlete	Event	Qualifying		Finals	
Athlete	Event	Points	Rank	Points	Rank
Jang Sun-jae	Men's point race	48	1 Q	27	10
Cho Ho-Sung	Men's point race	8	3 Q	43	9
Lee Ju-Mi	Women's point race			7	6
Na A-Reum	Women's point race			did not finish	

Time Trial

Athlete	Event	Finals	
Athlete	Event	Time	Rank
Kim Won-Gyeong	Women's 500m time trial	50.277	5

== Dance Sports ==
Athlete	Event	Quarterfinal	Semifinal	Final	Rank
Jo Sang-Hyo; Lee Se-Hee	Standard dance – Five dances		45	193.64	2nd place, silver medalist(s)
Jo Sang-Hyo; Lee Se-Hee	Standard dance – Waltz	9	9	39.07	3rd place, bronze medalist(s)
Lee Sang-Min; Kim Hye-In	Standard dance – Quickstep	9	8	37.71	3rd place, bronze medalist(s)
Nam Sang-Woong; Song Yi-Na	Standard dance – Slow foxtrot	9	9	39.36	2nd place, silver medalist(s)
Nam Sang-Woong; Song Yi-Na	Standard dance – Tango	9	8	37.21	2nd place, silver medalist(s)
Kim Dae-Dong; Yoo Hae-Sook	Latin dance – Five dances	31	40	193.21	3rd place, bronze medalist(s)
Kim Do-Hyeon; Park Su-Myo	Latin dance – Cha-cha-cha	7	7	37.57	2nd place, silver medalist(s)
Kim Do-Hyeon; Park Su-Myo	Latin dance – Jive	7	7	40.21	2nd place, silver medalist(s)
Jang Se-Jin; Lee Hae-In	Latin dance – Paso doble	8	8	40.29	2nd place, silver medalist(s)
Jang Se-Jin; Lee Hae-In	Latin dance – Samba	8	8	39.36	2nd place, silver medalist(s)

== Diving ==
Men

Athlete	Event	Preliminary		Final	
Athlete	Event	Points	Rank	Points	Rank
Son Seong-Cheol	Men's 1 metre springboard			348.20	6
Son Seong-Cheol	Men's 3 metre springboard	417.10	5 Q	426.30	4
Oh Yi-Taek	Men's 1 metre springboard			362.50	4
Park Ji-Ho	Men's 3 metre springboard	418.40	4 Q	388.55	8
Park Ji-Ho	Men's 10 metre platform	366.40	10 Q	428.40	6
Kim Jin-Yong	Men's 10 metre platform	376.95	9 Q	340.50	9
Park Ji-Ho; Son Seong-Cheol	Men's synchronised 3 metre springboard			388.26	3rd place, bronze medalist(s)
Kim Jin-Yong; Oh Yi-Taek	Men's synchronised 10 metre platform			389.34	4

Women

Athlete	Event	Preliminary		Final	
Athlete	Event	Points	Rank	Points	Rank
Lee Ye-Rim	Women's 1 metre springboard			223.45	9
Lee Ye-Rim	Women's 3 metre springboard	247.70	7 Q	205.55	9
Cho Eun-Bi	Women's 1 metre springboard			219.75	10
Cho Eun-Bi	Women's 10 metre platform	235.60	10 Q	235.55	10
Yoon Seung-Eun	Women's 10 metre platform	261.30	9 Q	268.85	8
Kim Na-Mi; Lee Ye-Rim	Women's synchronised 3 metre springboard			did not finish	
Cho Eun-Bi; Yoon Seung-Eun	Women's synchronised 10 metre platform			280.59	5

== Dragon boat ==
Team	Event	Heat		Repechage		Finals	
Team	Event	Time	Rank	Time	Rank	Time	Rank
Team Korea	Men's 250 m	54.524	6 QR	54.287	3 QB	54.083	7
Team Korea	Men's 500 m	1:49.261	4 QR	1:47.271	1 QA	1:48.142	4
Team Korea	Men's 1000 m	3:35.646	1 QA	–		3:37.254	3rd place, bronze medalist(s)

== Equestrian ==
Dressage

Athlete	Horse	Event	Qualifier		Round A		Round B		Average (A,B) / Final	
Athlete	Horse	Event	Points	Rank	Points	Rank	Points	Rank	Points	Rank
Hwang Young-Shik	Laura	Individual dressage	68.333	1 Q	71.368	1 Q	74.900	1	73.134	1st place, gold medalist(s)
Choi Jun-Sang	Ricco	Individual dressage	66.778	2 Q	67.105	5 Q	69.350	4	68.228	4
Kim Dong-Seon; Kim Kyun-Sub; Hwang Young-Shik; Choi Jun-Sang	Pleasure 18; Dark Secret; Laura; Ricco	Team dressage							65.759	1st place, gold medalist(s)

Eventing

Athlete	Horse	Event	Dressage	Cross country	1st jumping	Final jumping	Total	
Athlete	Horse	Event	Dressage	Cross country	1st jumping	Final jumping	Points	Rank
Cheon Jai-Sik	Thomas O´Mally2	Individual eventing	47.10	0.00	0.00	0.00	47.10	2nd place, silver medalist(s)
Song Sang-Wuk	Lutine de Brenil	Individual eventing	51.30	0.00	8.00	0.00	59.30	7
Kim Houng-Hun	Dragon 85	Individual eventing	60.80	0.00	8.00		60.80	20
Heo Jun-Sung	Heaps of Hope	Individual eventing	52.70	20.00	0.00		72.70	24
Heo Jun-Sung; Song Sang-Wuk; Cheon Jai-Sik; Kim Houng-Hun	Heaps of Hope; Lutine de Brenil; Thomas O´Mally2; Dragon 85	Team eventing	159.20	0.00	8.00		167.20	5

Jumping

Athlete	Horse	Event	Qualifier		Final	
Athlete	Horse	Event	Penalty	Rank	Penalty	Rank
Kim Sung-Whan	Qualitia Vande Groene	Individual jumping	15	23	17	12
Son Bong-Gak	Centurio 25	Individual jumping	0	1	Retired	18
Heo Jun-Sung	Sun Fire 2	Individual jumping	9	15	16	22
Kim Seok	Lido des Broches	Individual jumping	35	31		
Heo Jun-Sung; Son Bong-Gak; Kim Seok; Kim Sung-Whan	Sun Fire 2 Centurio 25; Lido des Broches; Qualitia Vande Groene	Team jumping	5	3	24	5

== Fencing ==
Men

Athlete	Event	Round of pool	Round of 32	Round of 16	Quarterfinals	Semifinals	Final	
Athlete	Event	Result Rank	Opposition Result	Opposition Result	Opposition Result	Opposition Result	Opposition Result	Rank
Jung Seung-hwa	Individual épée	5W 1L; 1 Q	Bye	Nguyen (VIE); W 15-7	Li (CHN); L 14-15	did not advance		
Kim Won-jin	Individual épée	5W 0L; 1 Q	Bye	Ghazi (KUW); W 14-13	Sakamoto (JPN); W 15-6	Yin (CHN); W 9-8	Li (CHN); W 13-11	1st place, gold medalist(s)
Choi Byung-chul	Individual foil	6W 0L; 1 Q	Bye	Al-Waleed (KUW); W 15-5	Ngan (HKG); W 15-6	Ota (JPN); W 15-12	Cheung (HKG); W 15-14	1st place, gold medalist(s)
Kwon Young-ho	Individual foil	4W 1L; 1 Q	Bye	Abdulkarim (KUW); W 15-5	Cheung (HKG); L 7-15	did not advance		
Oh Eun-seok	Individual sabre	4W 1L; 1 Q	Bye	Al-Saadi (QAT); W 15-6	Lam (HKG); W 15-6	Gu (KOR); L 13-15	did not advance	3rd place, bronze medalist(s)
Gu Bon-gil	Individual sabre	5W 0L; 1 Q	Bye	Mohd Yunos (BRU); W 15-6	Turlybekov (KAZ); W 15-4	Oh (KOR); W 15-13	Zhong (CHN); W 15-13	1st place, gold medalist(s)
Jung Jin-sun; Kim Won-jin; Park Kyoung-doo; Jung Seung-hwa	Team épée			Bye	Kuwait (KUW); W 45-32	Japan (JPN); W 45-37	Kazakhstan (KAZ); W 45-31	1st place, gold medalist(s)
Choi Byung-chul; Ha Tae-gyu; Heo Jun; Kwon Young-ho	Team foil			Bye	Saudi Arabia (KSA); W 45-17	Japan (JPN); L 36-45	did not advance	3rd place, bronze medalist(s)
Gu Bon-Gil; Kim Jung-hwan; Oh Eun-seok; Won Woo-young	Team sabre				Saudi Arabia (KSA); W 45-18	Kazakhstan (KAZ); W 45-33	China (CHN); L 44-45	2nd place, silver medalist(s)

Women

Athlete	Event	Round of pool	Round of 16	Quarterfinals	Semifinals	Final	
Athlete	Event	Result Rank	Opposition Result	Opposition Result	Opposition Result	Opposition Result	Rank
Oh Yun-hee	Individual épée	4W 2L; 3 Q	Jung (KOR); L 3-6	did not advance			
Jung Hyo-jung	Individual épée	3W 3L; 3 Q	Oh (KOR); W 6-3	Xu (CHN); L 6-15	did not advance		
Nam Hyun-hee	Individual foil	5W 0L; 1 Q	Bye	Ikehata (JPN); W 11-8	Jeon (KOR); W 15-14	Chen (CHN); W 15-3	1st place, gold medalist(s)
Jeon Hee-sook	Individual foil	4W 1L; 2 Q	Devi (IND); W 15-3	Nishioka (JPN); W 15-6	Nam (KOR); L 14-15	did not advance	3rd place, bronze medalist(s)
Kim Keum-hwa	Individual sabre	5W 0L; 1 Q	Bye	Au Yeung (HKG); W 15-3	Kim (KOR); L 11-15	did not advance	3rd place, bronze medalist(s)
Kim Hye-lim	Individual sabre	4W 1L; 2 Q	Lim (SIN); W 15-3	Lee (SIN); W 15-8	Kim (KOR); W 15-11	Au Sin (HKG); W 15-7	1st place, gold medalist(s)
Jung Hyo-jung; Oh Yun-hee; Park Se-ra; Shin A-lam	Team épée		Bye	Chinese Taipei (TPE); W 45-22	China (CHN); L 28-43	did not advance	3rd place, bronze medalist(s)
Jeon Hee-sook; Nam Hyun-hee; Oh Ha-na; Seo Mi-jung	Team foil			Qatar (QAT); W 45-4	Hong Kong (HKG); W 45-13	Japan (JPN); W 45-27	1st place, gold medalist(s)
Kim Hye-lim; Kim Keum-hwa; Lee Ra-jin; Lee Woo-ri	Team sabre			Bye	Kazakhstan (KAZ); W 45-29	China (CHN); L 40-45	2nd place, silver medalist(s)

== Football ==
=== Men's tournament ===
==== Group stage (Group C) ====
Pos	Team	Pld	W	D	L	GF	GA	GD	Pts
1	North Korea	3	3	0	0	7	0	+7	9
2	South Korea	3	2	0	1	7	1	+6	6
3	Palestine	3	0	1	2	0	6	−6	1
4	Jordan	3	0	1	2	0	7	−7	1

Source: RSSSF
November 8
16:00

South Korea	0 – 1	North Korea
	Report	Ri Kwang-Chon 36'

Yuexiushan Stadium, Guangzhou
Referee: Ben Williams (Australia)

November 10
16:00

South Korea	4 – 0	Jordan
Koo Ja-Cheol 21', 44'; Kim Bo-Kyung 46'; Cho Young-Cheol 78'	Report

Yuexiushan Stadium, Guangzhou
Referee: Tayeb Shamsuzzaman (Bangladesh)

November 13
16:00

South Korea	3 – 0	Palestine
Yoon Bit-Garam 10'; Park Chu-Young 13'; Park Hee-Sung 52'	Report

Yuexiushan Stadium, Guangzhou
Referee: Ibrahim Al-Hosni (Oman)

==== Round of 16 ====
November 15
19:00

China	0 – 3	South Korea
	Report	Kim Jung-Woo 19'; Park Chu-Young 49'; Cho Young-Cheol 58'

Tianhe Stadium, Guangzhou
Referee: Saeid Mozaffabi (Iran)

==== Quarter-finals ====
November 19
19:00

Uzbekistan	–	South Korea

Tianhe Stadium, Guangzhou

=== Women's tournament ===
==== Group stage (Group A) ====
Pos	Team	Pld	W	D	L	GF	GA	GD	Pts
1	South Korea	3	2	1	0	11	1	+10	7
2	China	3	2	1	0	11	1	+10	7
3	Vietnam	3	1	0	2	4	7	−3	3
4	Jordan	3	0	0	3	1	18	−17	0

Source: RSSSF
November 14
16:00

South Korea	6 – 1	Vietnam
Ji So-Yun 7'; Park Hee-young 14', 72' (pen.); Nhieu Thuy Linh 27' (o.g.); Kwon Hah-Nul 29', 77'	Report	Nguyen Thi Muon 1'

University City Stadium, Guangzhou
Referee: Sachiko Yamagishi (Japan)

November 16
16:00

Jordan	0 – 5	South Korea
	Report	Ji So-Yun 4', 32' (pen.), 76'; Kwon Eun-Som 39'; Yoo Young-A 66'

University City Stadium, Guangzhou
Referee: Jacqui Melksham (Australia)

November 18
19:00

China	–	South Korea

University City Stadium, Guangzhou

== Judo ==
Men

Athlete	Event	Preliminary Round	Round of 16	Quarterfinals	Semifinals / Repechage	Final / Bronze-medal match	
Athlete	Event	Opposition Result	Opposition Result	Opposition Result	Opposition Result	Opposition Result	Rank
Choi Min-Ho	–60 kg	Kim (PRK); W 011-001	Sarhan (PLE); W 120-000	A (CHN); W 100-000	Sobirov (UZB); L 001-011	Kossayev (KAZ); W 101-000	3rd place, bronze medalist(s)
Kim Joo-Jin	–66 kg	Bye	Meneiawi (KSA); W 111-000	Miresmaeili (IRI); W 100-000	Morishita (JPN); W 100-000	Farmonov (UZB); W 001-000	1st place, gold medalist(s)
Wang Ki-chun	–73 kg	Bye	Ganbaatar (MGL); W 010-001	Yadav (IND); W 111-000	Kim (PRK); W 100-000	Akimoto (JPN); L 000-001	2nd place, silver medalist(s)
Kim Jae-Bum	–81 kg	Bye	Baylon (PHI); W 100-000	Hanfi (QAT); W 100-000	Otgonbaatar (MGL); W 001-000	Muminov (UZB); W 110-100	1st place, gold medalist(s)
Lee Kyu-Won	–90 kg	Ghomi (IRI); W 100-000	Nuryyev (TKM); W 100-000	Enkhbat (MGL); L 001-002	Fadel (LIB); W 111-000	Bolat (KAZ); W 100-000	3rd place, bronze medalist(s)
Hwang Hee-Tae	–100 kg	Bye	Al-Hammadi (UAE); W 111-000	Shao (CHN); W 120-000	Rakov (KAZ); W 001-001	Anai (JPN); W 100-000	1st place, gold medalist(s)
Kim Soo-Wan	+100 kg		Wang (CHN); W 100-000	Roudaki (IRI); W 111-000	Kamikawa (JPN); W 001-000	Tangriev (UZB); W 100-000	1st place, gold medalist(s)
Kim Soo-Wan	Open		Sahatov (TKM); L 010-100	did not advance			

Women

Athlete	Event	Round of 16	Quarterfinals	Semifinals / Repechage	Final / Bronze-medal match	
Athlete	Event	Opposition Result	Opposition Result	Opposition Result	Opposition Result	Rank
Chung Jung-Yeon	–48 kg	Phannouvong (PHI); W 111-000	Devi (IND); W 110-000	Wu (CHN); L 000-100	Hwang (PRK); W 100-000	3rd place, bronze medalist(s)
Kim Kyung-Ok	–52 kg	Un (MAC); W 100-000	An (PRK); L 000-101	Sadmaroeng (THA); W 100-000	He (CHN); L 000-011	4
Kim Jan-Di	–57 kg	Rezayee (AFG); W 100-000	Abrurahmanova (UZB); W 002-001	Tumen (MGL); W 100-000	Matsumoto (JPN); L 000-001	2nd place, silver medalist(s)
Kong Ja-Young	–63 kg	Bye	Hayytbaeva (TKM); W 120-000	Wang (TPE); L 000-101	Selenge (MGL); W 001-000	3rd place, bronze medalist(s)
Hwang Ye-Sul	–70 kg	Bye	Solomon (PHI); W 100-000	Chen (CHN); W 110-000	Kyong (PRK); W 100-000	1st place, gold medalist(s)
Jeong Gyeong-Mi	–78 kg		Kakharova (KGZ); W 102-000	Yang (CHN); W 101-001	Ogata (JPN); W 100-000	1st place, gold medalist(s)
Kim Na-Young	+78 kg		Huang (TPE); W 121-000	Sugimoto (JPN); L 001-002	Tserenkhand (MGL); W 001-000	3rd place, bronze medalist(s)
Kim Na-Young	Open	Bye	Abdrassulova (KAZ); W 100-000	Bunduang (THA); W 101-000	Liu (CHN); L 000-001	2nd place, silver medalist(s)

== Swimming ==
Men

Athlete	Event	Heats		Final	
Athlete	Event	Time	Rank	Time	Rank
Kim Yong-Sik	Men's 50 m freestyle	23.72	5	did not advance	
Park Min-Kyu	Men's 50 m freestyle	22.90	2 Q	22.87	T4
Park Min-Kyu	Men's 100 m freestyle	50.71	3 Q	50.43	7
Park Tae-Hwan	Men's 100 m freestyle	49.85	1 Q	48.70	1st place, gold medalist(s)
Park Tae-Hwan	Men's 200 m freestyle	1:49.15	1 Q	1:44.80 AR	1st place, gold medalist(s)
Park Tae-Hwan	Men's 400 m freestyle	3:55.80	2 Q	3:41.53	1st place, gold medalist(s)
Park Tae-Hwan	Men's 1500 m freestyle			15:01.72	2nd place, silver medalist(s)
Kim Ji-heun	Men's 50 m backstroke	26.99	5	did not advance	
Kim Ji-heun	Men's 100 m backstroke	56.61	2 Q	56.11	6
Kim Ji-heun	Men's 200 m backstroke	2:02.54	1 Q	1:59.03	4
Park Seon-Kwan	Men's 50 m backstroke	26.16	2 Q	25.75	4
Park Seon-Kwan	Men's 100 m backstroke	55.77	2 Q	54.57	4
Park Seon-Kwan	Men's 200 m backstroke	2:04.01	2 Q	2:01.33	5
Choi Kyu-Woong	Men's 50 m breaststroke	28.85	4	did not advance	
Choi Kyu-Woong	Men's 100 m breaststroke	1:02.86	2 Q	1:01.98	6
Choi Kyu-Woong	Men's 200 m breaststroke	2:15.26	1 Q	2:12.25	3rd place, bronze medalist(s)
Jeong Doo-Hee	Men's 50 m butterfly	24.48	1 Q	24.37	4
Jeong Doo-Hee	Men's 100 m butterfly	53.94	2 Q	53.57	6
Jang Kyu-Cheol	Men's 50 m butterfly	24.75	3 Q	24.60	7
Jang Kyu-Cheol	Men's 100 m butterfly	53.37	2 Q	53.40	5
Jang Kyu-Cheol	Men's 200 m butterfly	1:59.26	3 Q	1:59.07	6
Lee Hyun-Seung	Men's 200 m freestyle	1:50.45	2 Q	1:50.42	6
Bae Joon-Mo	Men's 200 m butterfly	2:05.82	4	did not advance	
Jang Sang-Jin	Men's 400 m freestyle	3:59.80	3 Q	3:55.34	6
Jang Sang-Jin	Men's 1500 m freestyle			15:49.26	4
Jung Won-Yong	Men's 200 m individual medley	2:06.91	3	did not advance	
Jung Won-Yong	Men's 400 m individual medley	4:23.14	3 Q	4:24.82	5
Kim Min-kyu	Men's 200 m individual medley	2:05.09	2 Q	2:05.12	7
Kim Min-kyu	Men's 400 m individual medley	4:29.42	4 Q	4:27.03	7
Kim Yong-Sik; Bae Joon-Mo; Park Seon-Kwan; Park Tae-Hwan	Men's 4 × 100 m freestyle relay	3:24.33	2 Q	3:19.02	3rd place, bronze medalist(s)
Jeong Doo-Hee; Choi Kyu-Woong; Park Seon-Kwan; Park Tae-Hwan	Men's 4 × 100 m medley relay	3:46.55	3 Q	3:38.30	2nd place, silver medalist(s)
Kim Yong-Sik; Lee Hyun-Seung; Jang Sng-Jin; Park Seon-Kwan; Park Tae-Hwan	Men's 4 × 200 m freestyle relay	7:30.96	2 Q	7:24.14	3rd place, bronze medalist(s)

Women

Athlete	Event	Heats		Final	
Athlete	Event	Time	Rank	Time	Rank
Lee Jae-Young	Women's 50 m freestyle	Disqualified		did not advance	
Lee Jae-Young	Women's 100 m freestyle	57.06	3 Q	56.81	6
Lee Jae-Young	Women's 200 m freestyle	2:04.49	5 Q	2:01.94	5
Ham Chan-Mi	Women's 50 m backstroke	30.78	5	did not advance	
Ham Chan-Mi	Women's 100 m backstroke	1:04.29	2 Q	1:03.56	8
Ham Chan-Mi	Women's 200 m backstroke	2:16.20	3 Q	2:13.78	5
Lee Joo-Hyung	Women's 50 m backstroke	29.55	3 Q	28.80	5
Lee Joo-Hyung	Women's 100 m backstroke	1:05.01	3	did not advance	
Lee Joo-Hyung	Women's 200 m backstroke	2:26.71	5	did not advance	
Jeong Da-Rae	Women's 50 m breaststroke	32.22	2 Q	31.98	4
Jeong Da-Rae	Women's 100 m breaststroke	1:09.26	1 Q	1:09.00	4
Jeong Da-Rae	Women's 200 m breaststroke	2:27.07	1 Q	2:25.02	1st place, gold medalist(s)
Baek Su-Yeon	Women's 50 m breaststroke	32.99	3 Q	33.16	8
Baek Su-Yeon	Women's 100 m breaststroke	1:10.19	2 Q	1:09.80	6
Baek Su-Yeon	Women's 200 m breaststroke	2:30.43	1 Q	2:28.27	6
Kim Ga-Eul	Women's 50 m butterfly	28.84	5	did not advance	
Kim Ga-Eul	Women's 100 m freestyle	58.34	4	did not advance	
Kim Ga-Eul	Women's 800 m freestyle	Bye		9:13.16	8
Park Na-Ri	Women's 100 m butterfly	1:00.80	4 Q	1:00.68	7
Park Na-Ri	Women's 200 m butterfly	2:14.24	4 Q	2:12.42	7
Choi Hye-Ra	Women's 100 m butterfly	1:00.85	5	did not advance	
Choi Hye-Ra	Women's 200 m butterfly	2:11.40	3 Q	2:08.39	3rd place, bronze medalist(s)
Choi Hye-Ra	Women's 200 m individual medley	2:17.00	3 Q	2:12.85	3rd place, bronze medalist(s)
Ha Eun-Ju	Women's 200 m freestyle	2:07.08	6	did not advance	
Ha Eun-Ju	Women's 400 m freestyle	4:24.58	6	did not advance	
Seo Youn-Jeong	Women's 400 m freestyle	4:18.63	2 Q	4:14.50	3rd place, bronze medalist(s)
Seo Youn-Jeong	Women's 800 m freestyle	8:48.74	1	did not advance	
Nam Yu-Seon	Women's 200 m individual medley	2:18.11	3 Q	2:16.85	7
Nam Yu-Seon	Women's 400 m individual medley	4:46.59	2 Q	4:47.11	6
Choi Hye-Ra; Lee Jae-Young; Park Na-Ri; Seo Youn-Jeong	Women's 4 × 100 m freestyle relay			3:45.86	4
Jeong Da-Rae; Lee Jae-Young; Lee Joo-Hyung; Park Na-Ri	Women's 4 × 100 m medley relay			4:07.74	4
Choi Hye-Ra; Lee Jae-Young; Park Na-Ri; Seo Youn-Jeong	Women's 4 × 200 m freestyle relay			8:07.78	3rd place, bronze medalist(s)

== Synchronized swimming ==
Athlete	Event	Technical routine		Free routine		Total points	Rank
Athlete	Event	Points	Rank	Points	Rank	Total points	Rank
Park Hyun-Ha; Park Hyun-Sun	Duet	88.000	3	89.875	3	177.875	3rd place, bronze medalist(s)

== Water polo ==
=== Group stage (group A) ===
Pos	Team	Pld	W	D	L	GF	GA	GD	Pts	Qualification
1	Japan	4	4	0	0	72	16	+56	8	Quarterfinals
2	China	4	3	0	1	72	16	+56	6	Quarterfinals
3	South Korea	4	2	0	2	54	33	+21	4	Quarterfinals
4	Hong Kong	4	1	0	3	33	73	−40	2	Quarterfinals
5	Qatar	4	0	0	4	5	98	−93	0	

Source: Results

November 18; 14:30	Report	South Korea	18–5	Hong Kong	Tianhe Natatorium, Guangzhou; Referees: Tan (SIN), Al-Saad (KUW)
November 18; 14:30	Report	Score by quarters: 4–2, 3–0, 6–2, 5–1			Tianhe Natatorium, Guangzhou; Referees: Tan (SIN), Al-Saad (KUW)
November 18; 14:30	Report	Kang J.W. 4	Goals	Zhao J.W. 2	Tianhe Natatorium, Guangzhou; Referees: Tan (SIN), Al-Saad (KUW)

November 19; 14:30	Report	Qatar	1–26	South Korea	Tianhe Natatorium, Guangzhou; Referees: Salnichenko (KAZ), Al-Sheaifi (KSA)
November 19; 14:30	Report	Score by quarters: 1–5, 0–7, 0–4, 0–10			Tianhe Natatorium, Guangzhou; Referees: Salnichenko (KAZ), Al-Sheaifi (KSA)
November 19; 14:30	Report	Abdeen 1	Goals	Lee M.S. 6	Tianhe Natatorium, Guangzhou; Referees: Salnichenko (KAZ), Al-Sheaifi (KSA)

November 21; 15:55	Report	South Korea	6–13	China	Tianhe Natatorium, Guangzhou; Referees: Margeta (SLO), Makihashi (JPN)
November 21; 15:55	Report	Score by quarters: 1–3, 0–2, 2–2, 3–6			Tianhe Natatorium, Guangzhou; Referees: Margeta (SLO), Makihashi (JPN)
November 21; 15:55	Report	Gwon Y.G., Lee D.J. 2	Goals	Tan F.H. 3	Tianhe Natatorium, Guangzhou; Referees: Margeta (SLO), Makihashi (JPN)

November 22; 9:00	Report	Japan	14–4	South Korea	Tianhe Natatorium, Guangzhou; Referees: Ni (CHN), Stavridis (GRE)
November 22; 9:00	Report	Score by quarters: 7–1, 1–1, 1–0, 5–2			Tianhe Natatorium, Guangzhou; Referees: Ni (CHN), Stavridis (GRE)
November 22; 9:00	Report	Shimizu, Yanase 3	Goals	Park J.J. 2	Tianhe Natatorium, Guangzhou; Referees: Ni (CHN), Stavridis (GRE)

=== Quarterfinal ===
November 23; 19:30	Report	South Korea	4–3	Kuwait	Tianhe Natatorium, Guangzhou; Referees: Salnichenko (KAZ), Stavridis (GRE)
November 23; 19:30	Report	Score by quarters: 1–0, 3–2, 0–1, 0–0			Tianhe Natatorium, Guangzhou; Referees: Salnichenko (KAZ), Stavridis (GRE)
November 23; 19:30	Report	4 Players 1	Goals	Al-Otaibi, A. Mohammad, Khan 1	Tianhe Natatorium, Guangzhou; Referees: Salnichenko (KAZ), Stavridis (GRE)

=== Semifinal ===
November 24; 19:30	Report	China	22–9	South Korea	Tianhe Natatorium, Guangzhou; Referees: Makihashi (JPN), Tan (SIN)
November 24; 19:30	Report	Score by quarters: 6–1, 5–1, 8–3, 3–4			Tianhe Natatorium, Guangzhou; Referees: Makihashi (JPN), Tan (SIN)
November 24; 19:30	Report	Tan F.H., Pan N. 4	Goals	Kim H.J., Park B.S. 2	Tianhe Natatorium, Guangzhou; Referees: Makihashi (JPN), Tan (SIN)

=== Bronze-medal match ===
November 25; 19:45	Report	South Korea	5–19	Japan	Tianhe Natatorium, Guangzhou; Referees: Ni (CHN), Margeta (SLO)
November 25; 19:45	Report	Score by quarters: 1–2, 2–5, 0–6, 2–6			Tianhe Natatorium, Guangzhou; Referees: Ni (CHN), Margeta (SLO)
November 25; 19:45	Report	Kang J.W., Lee D.J. 2	Goals	Shimizu 5	Tianhe Natatorium, Guangzhou; Referees: Ni (CHN), Margeta (SLO)
