= Lee Jong-chan =

South Korean footballer

Personal information
- Full name: Lee Jong-chan
- Date of birth: 26 May 1987 (age 39)
- Place of birth: South Korea
- Height: 1.77 m (5 ft 9 1/2 in)
- Position: Defender

Youth career
- Pai Chai University

Senior career*
Years	Team	Apps	(Gls)
2007–2008	Jeju United	0	(0)
2009–2012	Daejeon Citizen	1	(0)
2011–2012	→ Sangju Sangmu (Army)	6	(0)
- * Club domestic league appearances and goals as of 4 September 2012

Lee Jong-chan (Korean: 이종찬; born 26 May 1987) is a South Korean footballer who plays as a defender.
