= Ko Chang-seong =

South Korean baseball player (born 1984)

- Relief pitcher
- Born: December 21, 1984 (age 40); Seoul, South Korea
- Batted: Right Threw: Right

KBO debut
- April 2, 2008, for the Doosan Bears

Last appearance
- October 13, 2018, for the kt wiz

KBO statistics
- Win–loss record: 18–13
- Holds: 62
- Strikeouts: 212
- Earned run average: 3.89

Teams
- Doosan Bears (2008–2012); NC Dinos (2013–2015); kt wiz (2018)
Medals
Representing South Korea
Men's baseball
Asian Games
Gold medal – first place	2010 Guangzhou	Team

- Ko Chang-seong
- Hangul: 고창성
- Hanja: 高昌成
- RR: Go Changseong
- MR: Ko Ch'angsŏng

Ko Chang-seong (Korean: 고창성; Hanja: 高昌成; born December 21, 1984, in Seoul, South Korea) is a sidearm pitcher playing for the NC Dinos in the KBO League. He bats and throws right-handed.

== Professional career ==
Ko played college baseball at Kyungsung University in Busan. He was drafted by the Doosan Bears in the 3rd round (20th overall) of the 2008 Korea Baseball Organization Draft.

In the set-up role, Ko drew the attention of the league when he posted a 1.95 ERA and earned 16 holds in 2009. He enjoyed another great season as a setup man in 2010, when he earned 22 holds which was runner-up in the KBO league. After the 2010 season, Ko was selected for the South Korean national baseball team to compete in the 2010 Asian Games where he won the gold medal.

In 2011, Ko earned 14 holds but his ERA rose to 4.44. In 2012, he finished the season with an 8.62 ERA losing all ability to control his pitches. Ko was sent down to the second-tier team of the Bears in the middle of the 2012 season and traded to the NC Dinos after the season.
