= Japan at the 2010 Asian Games =

- IOC code: JPN
- NOC: Japanese Olympic Committee

in Guangzhou
- Competitors: 729 in 42 sports
- Flag bearer: Reiko Shiota
- Medals Ranked 3rd: Gold 48 Silver 74 Bronze 94 Total 216

Asian Games appearances (overview)
- 1951; 1954; 1958; 1962; 1966; 1970; 1974; 1978; 1982; 1986; 1990; 1994; 1998; 2002; 2006; 2010; 2014; 2018; 2022; 2026

Japan participated in the 2010 Asian Games in Guangzhou, China on 12–27 November 2010.

== Medal summary ==
=== Medalists ===
Medal	Name	Sport	Event	Date
Gold	Takeshi Matsuda	Swimming	Men's 200 m butterfly	13 November
Gold	Yuya Horihata	Swimming	Men's 400 m individual medley	13 November
Gold	Mariko Adachi	Triathlon	Women's individual	13 November
Gold	Yuichi Hosoda	Triathlon	Men's individual	14 November
Gold	Mika Sugimoto	Judo	Women's +78 kg	14 November
Gold	Takashi Ono	Judo	Men's -90 kg	14 November
Gold	Yoshie Ueno	Judo	Women's -63 kg	14 November
Gold	Kana Morihara; Hitomi Sugimoto; Eri Uehara; Ayaka Oba; Mai Sasaki	Soft tennis	Women's team	14 November
Gold	Hiroyuki Akimoto	Judo	Men's -73 kg	15 November
Gold	Misato Nakamura	Judo	Women's -52 kg	15 November
Gold	Kaori Matsumoto	Judo	Women's -57 kg	15 November
Gold	Ryo Tateishi	Swimming	Men's 100 m breaststroke	15 November
Gold	Naoya Tomita	Swimming	Men's 200 m breaststroke	15 November
Gold	Ryosuke Irie	Swimming	Men's 200 m backstroke	16 November
Gold	Kazuhiko Takahashi	Judo	Men's Open	16 November
Gold	Ryosuke Irie	Swimming	Men's 100 m backstroke	16 November
Gold	Tsuyoshi Suzuki	Cue Sports	Men's Carom 3 Cushion Singles	17 November
Gold	Ken Takakuwa	Swimming	Men's 200 m individual medley	17 November
Gold	Yu Kataoka; Hideki Omoto; Yoshinori Sato; Takahiro Suda	Rowing	Men's Lightweight Coxless Four	18 November
Gold	Junya Koga	Swimming	Men's 50 m backstroke	18 November
Gold	Ryosuke Irie; Takuro Fujii; Ryo Tateishi; Rammaru Harada; Kosuke Kitajima; Shunsuke Kuzuhara; Masayuki Kishida	Swimming	Men's 4 x 100 m medley relay	18 November
Gold	Eri Wakai	Rowing	Women's Lightweight Single Sculls	19 November
Gold	Yukie Nakayama	Shooting	Women's Trap	19 November
Gold	Hitomi Sugimoto; Eri Uehara	Soft tennis	Women's doubles	19 November
Gold	Kenki Sato	Equestrian	Eventing Individual	20 November
Gold	Kenki Sato; Yoshiaki Oiwa; Takayuki Yumira; Atsushi Negishi	Equestrian	Eventing Team	20 November
Gold	Ryunosuke Harada; Yugo Yoshida	Sailing	Men's Double Handed Dinghy 470	20 November
Gold	Ai Kondo; Wakako Tabata	Sailing	Women's Double Handed Dinghy 470	20 November
Gold	Yasuhiro Okamoto; Wataru Sakamoto; Daichi Wada; Hiroaki Yoshifuji	Sailing	Open Match Racing	20 November
Gold	Kohei Hasegawa	Wrestling	Men's Greco-Roman 55 kg	21 November
Gold	Chisato Fukushima	Athletics	Women's 100 m	22 November
Gold	Japan	Football	Women's team	22 November
Gold	Megumi Ikeda; Nozomi Nakano; Ayaka Shimookawa	Fencing	Women's Team Épée	23 November
Gold	Japan	Rugby	Men's sevens	23 November
Gold	Rika Usami	Karate	Women's Individual Kata	24 November
Gold	Tatsuhiro Yonemitsu	Wrestling	Men's Freestyle 66 kg	24 November
Gold	Chisato Fukushima	Athletics	Women's 200 m	25 November
Gold	Yuki Ebihara	Athletics	Women's javelin throw	25 November
Gold	Japan	Football	Men's team	25 November
Gold	Momotaro Matsushita	Canoeing	Men's K1 200 m	26 November
Gold	Yukifumi Murakami	Athletics	Men's Javelin Throw	26 November
Gold	Momotaro Matsushita; Keiji Mizumoto	Canoeeing	Men's K2 200 m	26 November
Gold	Shinobu Kitamoto	Canoeing	Women's K1 200 m	26 November
Gold	Yu Miyamoto	Karate	Women's Kumite -61 kg	26 November
Gold	Shingo Nishiki	Roller Sports Artistic	Men's Free Skating	26 November
Gold	Japan	Softball	Women's team	26 November
Gold	Japan	Volleyball	Men's team	26 November
Gold	Saori Yoshida	Wrestling	Women's Freestyle 55 kg	26 November
Silver	Masayuki Ishihara; Ayami Kubo	Dancesport	Standard Dance Waltz	13 November
Silver	Masayuki Ishihara; Ayami Kubo	Dancesport	Standard Dance Quickstep	13 November
Silver	Ryosuke Baba; Ryotaka Deguchi; Shun Kuwahara; Hisashi Mizutori; Takuya Nakase; Kyoichi Watanabe	Artistic gymnastics	Men's team all-around	13 November
Silver	Takamasa Anai	Judo	Men's -100 kg	13 November
Silver	Akari Ogata	Judo	Women's -78 kg	13 November
Silver	Ryusuke Sakata	Swimming	Men's 200 m butterfly	13 November
Silver	Akane Tsuchihashi	Triathlon	Women's Individual	13 November
Silver	Daisuke Ichikizaki	Wushu	Men's Changquan	13 November
Silver	Ryosuke Yamamoto	Triathlon	Men's Individual	14 November
Silver	Haruka Ueda; Yuka Kato; Aya Terakawa; Satomi Susuki	Swimming	Women's 4 x 100 m medley relay	14 November
Silver	Takuya Haneda	Canoe-Kayak Slalom	Men's C1	14 November
Silver	Kazuki Yazawa	Canoe-Kayak Slalom	Men's K1	14 November
Silver	Kazuya Narita; Yudai Nitta; Kazunari Watanabe	Cycling Track	Men's Team Sprint	14 November
Silver	Yumiya Kubota; Rara Kubota	Dancesport	Latin Dance Five Dances	14 November
Silver	Kyoko Oshima; Momoko Ozawa; Yuko Shintake; Rie Tanaka; Koko Tsurumi; Mai Yamagishi	Artistic gymnastics	Women's Team All-around	14 November
Silver	Koji Kobayashi; Shigeo Nakahori; Tsuneo Takagawa; Keiya Nakamoto; Hidenori Shinohara	Soft tennis	Men's team	14 November
Silver	Ryo Tateishi	Swimming	Men's 50 m breaststroke	14 November
Silver	Takuro Fujii	Swimming	Men's 100 m butterfly	14 November
Silver	Shiho Sakai	Swimming	Women's 200 m backstroke	14 November
Silver	Haruka Ueda; Yayoi Matsumoto; Tomoko Hagiwara; Hanae Ito	Swimming	Women's 4 x 100 m freestyle relay	14 November
Silver	Masayuki Kishida	Swimming	Men's 50 m freestyle	15 November
Silver	Takeshi Matsuda; Shunsuke Kuzuhara; Sho Uchida; Yuki Kobori; Yoshihiro Okumura	Swimming	Men's 4 x 200 m freestyle relay	15 November
Silver	Aya Terakawa	Swimming	Women's 50 m backstroke	15 November
Silver	Natsumi Hoshi	Swimming	Women's 200 m butterfly	15 November
Silver	Yoshihiro Sekiya	Wushu	Women's Taijiquan\Taijijian All-Round	15 November
Silver	Rie Tanaka	Artistic gymnastics	Women's Vault	16 November
Silver	Hiroaki Hiraoka	Judo	Men's -60 kg	16 November
Silver	Tomoko Fukumi	Judo	Women's -48 kg	16 November
Silver	Yukari Mori	Shooting	Women's 25 m pistol	16 November
Silver	Junya Koga	Swimming	Men's 100 m backstroke	16 November
Silver	Masayuki Kishida	Swimming	Men's 50 m butterfly	16 November
Silver	Satomi Suzuki	Swimming	Women's 100 m breaststroke	16 November
Silver	Haruka Ueda; Yayoi Matsumoto; Risa Sekine; Hanae Ito	Swimming	Women's 4 x 200 m freestyle relay	14 November
Silver	Takuro Fujii; Rammaru Harada; Shunsuke Kuzuhara; Sho Uchida; Yuki Kobori; Yoshihiro Okumura	Swimming	Men's 4 x 100 m freestyle relay	17 November
Silver	Tomokatsu Yamashita; Shogo Wada	Bowling	Men's Doubles	17 November
Silver	Joji Kai	Cue Sports	Men's Carom 3 Cushion Singles	17 November
Silver	Tsubasa Kitatsuru	Cycling Track	Men's Sprint	17 November
Silver	Shun Kuwahara	Artistic gymnastics	Men's Horizontal Bar	17 November
Silver	Mai Yamagishi	Artistic gymnastics	Women's Floor	17 November
Silver	Shiho Sakai	Swimming	Women's 100 m backstroke	17 November
Silver	Erika Kasahara	Taekwondo	Women's Flyweight (-49kg)	17 November
Silver	Kohei Yamamoto	Cycling Mountain Bike	Men's Cross Country	18 November
Silver	Ryosuke Irie	Swimming	Men's 50 m backstroke	18 November
Silver	Yuka Kato	Swimming	Women's 50 m butterfly	18 November
Silver	Akiko Iwamoto; Atsumi Fukumoto	Rowing	Women's ightweight double sculls	19 November
Silver	Akifumi Sakamoto	Cycling BMX	Men's Individual	19 November
Silver	Ayaka Miwa	Cycling BMX	Women's Individual	19 November
Silver	Daisaku Takeda	Rowing	Men's Lightweight Single Sculls	19 November
Silver	Yukiko Inui; Chisa Kobayashi	Synchronized Swimming	Women's Duet	19 November
Silver	Nozomi Nakano	Fencing	Women's Individual Épée	20 November
Silver	Yumi Adachi; Miho Arai; Aika Hakoyama; Yukiko Inui; Mayo Itoyama; Chisa Kobayashi; Mai Nakamura; Misa Sugiyama; Yui Ueminami; Kurumi Yoshida	Synchronized Swimming	Women's Team	20 November
Silver	Hisaki Nagai	Sailing	Open Laser Radial	20 November
Silver	Yumi Adachi; Miho Arai; Aika Hakoyama; Yukiko Inui; Mayo Itoyama; Chisa Kobayashi; Mai Nakamura; Misa Sugiyama; Yui Ueminami; Kurumi Yoshida	Synchronized Swimming	Women's combination	21 November
Silver	Yuzo Kanemaru	Athletics	Men's 400 m	22 November
Silver	Asami Chiba	Athletics	Women's 400 m	22 November
Silver	Takashi Miyazawa	Cycling Road	Men's Road Race	22 November
Silver	Kanae Ikehata; Shiho Nishioka; Chie Yoshizawa	Fencing	Women's Team Foil	22 November
Silver	Tsurumaki Tsukasa	Wrestling	Men's Greco-Roman 74 kg	22 November
Silver	Yuki Nakata	Athletics	Women's Heptathlon	23 November
Silver	Hiromi Takahari	Athletics	Men's High Jump	23 November
Silver	Yuki Ota; Kenta Chida; Suguru Awaji; Yusuke Fukuda	Fencing	Men's Team Foil	23 November
Silver	Hiroyuki Oda	Wrestling	Men's Freestyle 60 kg	23 November
Silver	Itaru Oki	Karate	Men's Individual Kata	24 November
Silver	Miki Kobayashi	Karate	Women's Kumite -55 kg	24 November
Silver	Kazuyuki Nagashima	Wrestling	Men's Freestyle 74 kg	24 November
Silver	Masumi Fuchise	Athletics	Women's 20 km Walk	25 November
Silver	Kenji Fujimitsu	Athletics	Men's 200 m	25 November
Silver	Shinobu Kitamoto; Asumi Ohmura	Canoeing	Women's K2 500 m	26 November
Silver	Yusuke Ishitsuka; Kenji Fujimitsu; Hideyuki Hirose; Yuzo Kanemaru; Naohiro Kawakita	Athletics	Men's 4 x 400 m relay	26 November
Silver	Japan	Handball	Women's team	26 November
Silver	Ryutaro Araga	Karate	Men's Kumite -84 kg	26 November
Silver	Emiko Honma	Karate	Women's Kumite -68 kg	26 November
Silver	Yukihiro Kitaoka	Athletics	Men's Marathon	27 November
Bronze	Minato Kojima; Megumi Morita	Dancesport	Standard Dance Tango	13 November
Bronze	Tsuyoshi Nukina; Mariko Shibahara	Dancesport	Standard Dance Slow Foxtrot	13 November
Bronze	Daiki Kamikawa	Judo	Men's +100 kg	13 November
Bronze	Ken Takakuwa	Swimming	Men's 400 m individual medley	13 November
Bronze	Hanae Ito	Swimming	Women's 200 m freestyle	13 November
Bronze	Satomi Suzuki	Swimming	Women's 50 m breaststroke	13 November
Bronze	Yuka Kato	Swimming	Women's 100 m butterfly	13 November
Bronze	Tomoyuki Matsuda	Shooting	Men's 50 m rifle prone	14 November
Bronze	Tomoyuki Matsuda; Kojiro Horimizu; Susumu Kobayashi	Shooting	Men's 50 m rifle prone team	14 November
Bronze	Tsuneki Masatani; Megumi Saito	Dancesport	Latin Dance Samba	14 November
Bronze	Yumiya Kubota; Rara Kubota	Dancesport	Latin Dance Jive	14 November
Bronze	Masahiro Takamatsu	Judo	Men's -81 kg	14 November
Bronze	Aya Terakawa	Swimming	Women's 200 m backstroke	14 November
Bronze	Tomoyuki Matsuda; Kojiro Horimizu; Susumu Kobayashi	Shooting	Men's 10 m air pistol team	14 November
Bronze	Hisashi Mizutori	Artistic gymnastics	Men's Individual All-around	15 November
Bronze	Rie Tanaka	Artistic gymnastics	Women's Individual all-around	15 November
Bronze	Junpei Morishita	Judo	Men's -66 kg	15 November
Bronze	Seiko Iwata	Shooting	Women's 50 m rifle prone	15 November
Bronze	Rammaru Harada	Swimming	Men's 50 m freestyle	15 November
Bronze	Kaii Yoshida; Seiya Kishikawa; Jun Mizutani; Kenta Matsudaira; Koki Niwa	Table tennis	Men's team	15 November
Bronze	Tatsuma Ito; Toshihide Matsui; Takao Suzuki; Go Soeda	Tennis	Men's team	15 November
Bronze	Misaki Doi; Ryoko Fuda; Kimiko Date; Ayumi Morita	Tennis	Women's Team	15 November
Bronze	Asahi Yamada	Canoe-Kayak Slalom	Women's K1	16 November
Bronze	Momoko Ozawa	Artistic gymnastics	Women's Vault	16 November
Bronze	Koko Tsurumi	Artistic gymnastics	Women's Uneven Bars	16 November
Bronze	Megumi Tachimoto	Judo	Men's Open	16 November
Bronze	Yayoi Matsumoto	Swimming	Women's 50 m freestyle	16 November
Bronze	Yuki Hiraoka	Wushu	Women's Changquan	16 November
Bronze	Yudai Nitta	Cycling Track	Men's Sprint	17 November
Bronze	Keiya Nakamoto	Soft tennis	Men's singles	17 November
Bronze	Takuro Fujii	Swimming	Men's 100 m freestyle	17 November
Bronze	Takeshi Matsuda	Swimming	Men's 200 m freestyle	17 November
Bronze	Yuya Horihata	Swimming	Men's 200 m individual medley	17 November
Bronze	Haruka Ueda	Swimming	Women's 100 m freestyle	17 November
Bronze	Maiko Fujino	Swimming	Women's 800 m freestyle	17 November
Bronze	Rie Katayama	Cycling	Women's cross country	18 November
Bronze	Shogo Nishida	Fencing	Men's Individual Épée	18 November
Bronze	Ai Fukuhara; Seiya Iishikawa	Table Tennis	Mixed Doubles	18 November
Bronze	Kenta Matsudaira; Kasumi Ishikawa	Table Tennis	Mixed Doubles	18 November
Bronze	Kenta Tadachi; Kenta Kotani	Rowing	Men's Lightweight Double Sculls	19 November
Bronze	Japan	Cricket	Men's team	19 November
Bronze	Masahiro Sampei	Cycling BMX	Men's Individual	19 November
Bronze	Yuichi Matsuda; Susumu Teramoto; Takeshi Terashima; Yoshitaka Iida; Tomoyuki Nakatsuka; Jun Motohashi; Masahiro Yamada; Seiya Takano; Masanori Hayashi	Sepaktakraw	Men's Team	19 November
Bronze	Koji Kobayashi; Hidenori Shinohara	Soft tennis	Men's doubles	19 November
Bronze	Shigeo Nakahori; Tsuneo Takagawa	Soft tennis	Men's doubles	19 November
Bronze	Ayaka Oba; Mai Sasaki	Soft tennis	Women's doubles	19 November
Bronze	Kenta Matsudaira; Koki Niwa	Table Tennis	Men's Doubles	19 November
Bronze	Ai Fukuhara; Kasumi Ishikawa	Table Tennis	Women's Doubles	19 November
Bronze	Hiroko Fujii; Misako Wakamiya	Table Tennis	Women's Doubles	19 November
Bronze	Japan	Baseball	Men's team	20 November
Bronze	Eriko Hirose	Badminton	Women's Single	20 November
Bronze	Japan	Basketball	Women's team	20 November
Bronze	Yoshiaki Oiwa	Equestrian	Eventing Individual	20 November
Bronze	Yuki Ota	Fencing	Men's Individual Foil	20 November
Bronze	Jun Mizutani	Table Tennis	Men's Singles	20 November
Bronze	Ai Fukuhara	Table Tennis	Women's Singles	20 November
Bronze	Kimiko Date	Tennis	Women's Singles	20 November
Bronze	Misaki Doi; Takao Susuki	Tennis	Mixed Doubles	20 November
Bronze	Hiroaki Doi	Athletics	Men's Hammer Throw	21 November
Bronze	Minori Hayakari	Athletics	Women's 3000 m steeplechase	21 November
Bronze	Kazuyasu Minobe; Keisuke Sakamoto; Shogo Nishida	Fencing	Men's Team Épée	21 November
Bronze	Ryutaro Matsumoto	Wrestling	Men's freestyle 60 kg	21 November
Bronze	Tsutomu Fujimura	Wrestling	Men's freestyle 66 kg	21 November
Bronze	Yuka Murofushi	Athletics	Women's Hammer Throw	22 November
Bronze	Mai Nakagawa; Sayaka Shibusawa	Diving	Women's 3 m Synchronised Springboard	22 November
Bronze	Shinya Kudo; Satoshi Ogawa; Koji Yamamoto	Fencing	Men's Team Sabre	22 November
Bronze	Tetsuya Sotomura	Trampoline	Men's Individual	22 November
Bronze	Go Soeda	Tennis	Men's Singles	23 November
Bronze	Tatsuma Ito	Tennis	Men's Singles	23 November
Bronze	Yasuhiro Inaba	Wrestling	Men's freestyle 55 kg	23 November
Bronze	Kentaro Asahi; Katsuhiro Shiratori	Beach Volleyball	Men's Beach	24 November
Bronze	Katsuaki Susa	Boxing	Men's Flyweight	24 November
Bronze	Aya Shinmoto	Boxing	Women's Flyweight	24 November
Bronze	Japan	Field Hockey	Women's team	24 November
Bronze	Shinichi Tomii; Hayato Noguchi; Tomoya Miguchi; Shinya Fujii	Modern Pentathlon	Men's Team	24 November
Bronze	Tomomi Abiko	Athletics	Women's Pole Vault	25 November
Bronze	Naohiro Kawakita	Athletics	Men's 400 m hurdles	25 November
Bronze	Satomi Kubokura	Athletics	Women's 400 m hurdles	25 November
Bronze	Koichiro Morioka	Athletics	Men's 50 km walk	25 November
Bronze	Yasuhiro Suzuki	Canoeing	Men's K1 1000 m	25 November
Bronze	Shiho Kakizaki; Ayaka Kuno; Asumi Ohmura; Yumiko Susuki	Canoeing	Women's K4 500 m	25 November
Bronze	Keiji Mizumoto; Hiroki Watanabe	Canoeing	Men's K2 1000 m	25 November
Bronze	Riko Anakubo; Natsuki Konishi; Yuria Onuki; Runa Yamaguchi	Rhythmic gymnastics	Women's Team All-around	25 November
Bronze	Japan	Kabaddi	Men's team	25 November
Bronze	Japan	Water polo	Men's team	25 November
Bronze	Takao Isokawa	Wrestling	Men's Freestyle 96 kg	25 November
Bronze	Hitomi Sakamoto	Wrestling	Women's Freestyle 48 kg	25 November
Bronze	Mayumi Watanabe; Momoko Takahashi; Yumeka Sano; Chisato Fukushima; Asuka Terada	Athletics	Women's 4 x 100 m relay	26 November
Bronze	Jiro Akiyama; Yuta Iyama; Shinji Takao; Kimio Yamada; Keigo Yamashita; Satoshi Yuki	Weiqi	Men's team	26 November
Bronze	Naoya Sakamoto	Canoeing	Men's C1 200 m	26 November
Bronze	Shinobu Kitamoto	Canoeing	Women's K1 500 m	26 November
Bronze	Japan	Handball	Men's team	26 November
Bronze	Yuichi Matsuda; Susumu Teramoto; Takeshi Terashima	Sepaktakraw	Men's Double Regu	26 November
Bronze	Sawa Aoki; Yukie Sato; Chiharu Yano	Sepaktakraw	Women's Double Regu	26 November
Bronze	Kyoko Hamaguchi	Wrestling	Women's Freestyle 72 kg	25 November

=== Medal table ===
Sport	Gold	Silver	Bronze	Total
Swimming	9	18	12	39
Judo	7	5	3	15
Athletics	4	8	8	20
Wrestling	3	3	6	12
Canoeing	3	3	6	12
Sailing	3	1	0	4
Karate	2	4	0	6
Rowing	2	2	1	5
Triathlon	2	2	0	4
Soft tennis	2	1	4	7
Equestrian	2	0	1	3
Football	2	0	0	2
Fencing	1	3	4	8
Shooting	1	1	4	6
Cue sports	1	1	0	2
Roller sports	1	0	0	1
Rugby	1	0	0	1
Softball	1	0	0	1
Volleyball	1	0	0	1
Cycling	0	6	3	9
Artistic Gymnastics	0	5	4	9
DanceSport	0	3	4	7
Synchronised Swimming	0	3	0	3
Wushu	0	2	1	3
Handball	0	1	1	2
Taekwondo	0	1	0	1
Tennis	0	0	6	6
Sepaktakraw	0	0	3	3
Table Tennis	0	0	2	2
Boxing	0	0	2	2
Badminton	0	0	1	1
Weiqi	0	0	1	1
Diving	0	0	1	1
Baseball	0	0	1	1
Basketball	0	0	1	1
Beach Volleyball	0	0	1	1
Kabaddi	0	0	1	1
Cricket	0	0	1	1
Hockey	0	0	1	1
Trampoline Gymnastics	0	0	1	1
Total	48	74	94	214

== Archery ==
=== Men ===
Athlete	Event	Ranking Round		Round of 64	Round of 32	Round of 16	Quarterfinals	Semifinals	Final
Athlete	Event	Score	Seed	Opposition Score	Opposition Score	Opposition Score	Opposition Score	Opposition Score	Opposition Score
Takaharu Furukawa	Individual	1348	6th Q	BYE	Delfin Adriano (PHI); W 4-2 (56-51, 52-53, 56-51)	Keivan Riazimehr (IRI); W 7-3 (27-27, 27-26, 28-26, 26-27, 28-24)	Xing Yu (CHN); L 2-6 (29-27, 26-28, 27-29, 26-30)	did not advance	
Ryota Amano	Individual	1331	11th Q	BYE	Emdadul Haque Milon (BAN); W 4-0 (56-55, 58-55)	Kuo Cheng-wei (TPE); W 6-2 (28-28, 27-27, 29-27, 29-26)	Kim Woo-Jin (KOR); L 0-6 (29-30, 28-29, 26-30)	did not advance	
Hideki Kikuchi	Individual	1324	18th	did not advance					
Masashi Miyahara	Individual	1270	40th	did not advance					
Ryota Amano; Hideki Kikuchi; Takaharu Furukawa	Team	4003	3rd Q			Vietnam (VIE); W 226-199	Chinese Taipei (TPE); L 218-222	did not advance	

=== Women ===
Athlete	Event	Ranking Round		Round of 32	Round of 16	Quarterfinals	Semifinals	Final
Athlete	Event	Score	Seed	Opposition Score	Opposition Score	Opposition Score	Opposition Score	Opposition Score
Sayami Matsushita	Individual	1309	15th Q	Zuhro Tagoeva (TJK); W 4-2 (51-52, 51-49, 51-43)	Le Chien-ying (TPE); W 7-1 (28-24, 28-28, 29-28, 27-26)	Kwon Un-Sil (PRK); L 2-6 (27-28, 25-24, 25-26, 24-29)	did not advance	
Ayaka Saito	Individual	1299	17th Q	Erwina Safitri (INA); L 0-4 (47-51, 50-52)	did not advance			
Yuki Hayashi	Individual	1290	22nd	did not advance				
Kaori Kawanaka	Individual	1258	33rd	did not advance				
Yuki Hayashi; Kaori Kawanaka; Sayami Matsushita	Team	3857	7th Q		Iran (IRI); W 219-193	Chinese Taipei (TPE); L 205-207	did not advance	

== Athletics ==
=== Men ===
Track events

Event	Athletes	Heat Round 1		Semifinal		Final	
Event	Athletes	Result	Rank	Result	Rank	Result	Rank
100 m	Masashi Eriguchi	10.57	2nd QS	10.56	3rd	did not advance	
100 m	Naoki Tsukahara	DNS		did not advance			
200 m	Mitsuhiro Abiko	21.28	4th			did not advance	
200 m	Kenji Fujimitsu	20.80	2nd QF			20.74	2nd place, silver medalist(s)
400 m	Yusuke Ishitsuka	46.66	3rd QF			47.49	8th
400 m	Yuzo Kanemaru	46.33	1st QF			45.32 SB	2nd place, silver medalist(s)
800 m	Masato Yokota	1:49.26	2nd QF			1:46.48	4th
1500 m	Yasunori Murakami	3:46.72	5th QF			3:46.14	9th
5000 m	Kensuke Takezawa					13:54.11	6th
5000 m	Yuki Matsuoka					14:03.62	9th
10000 m	Satoru Kitamura					28:54.71	6th
110 m hurdles	Yuto Aoki	14.01	3rd QF			14.03	7th
110 m hurdles	Tasuku Tanonaka	13.90	4th QF			13.81	5th
400 m hurdles	Naohiro Kawakita	51.01	1st QF			50.37	3rd place, bronze medalist(s)
400 m hurdles	Kenji Narisako	50.15	1st QF			DSQ	
3000 m steeplechase	Tsuyoshi Takeda					8:41.26 SB	5th
4x100 m relay	Masashi Eriguchi; Shinji Takahira; Mitsuhiro Abiko; Kenji Fijimitsu	47.14	5th			did not advance	
4x400 m relay	Yusuke Ishitsuka; Kenji Fujimitsu; Hideyuki Hirose; Yuzo Kanemaru; Naohiro Kawakita*	3:06.53	1st QF			3:02.43 SB	2nd place, silver medalist(s)

* Participated in the heats only.

Field events

Event	Athletes	Qualification		Final	
Event	Athletes	Result	Rank	Result	Rank
High jump	Hiromi Takahari	2.15 m.	5th QF	2.23 m. PB	2nd place, silver medalist(s)
Long jump	Yohei Sugai			7.63 m.	4th
Pole vault	Takafumi Suzuki			5.20 m.	5th
Discus throw	Shigeo Hatakeyama			56.89 m.	5th
Javelin throw	Yukifumi Murakami			83.15 m. PB	1st place, gold medalist(s)
Hammer throw	Hiroaki Doi			68.72 m.	3rd place, bronze medalist(s)

Road events

Event	Athletes		
Event	Athletes	Final	
Event	Athletes	Result	Rank
20 km walk	Isamu Fujisawa	1:24:00	4th
20 km walk	Yusuke Suzuki	1:25:50	5th
50 km walk	Koichiro Morioka	3:47:41 PB	3rd place, bronze medalist(s)
Marathon	Yukihiro Kitaoka	2:12:46	2nd place, silver medalist(s)
Marathon	Tomoyuki Sato	2:18:24	7th

Combined events

Decathlon
Event	Keisuke Ushiro		
Event	Results	Points	Rank
100 m	11.37	780	10th
Long jump	6.74 m.	753	9th
Shot put	13.93 m.	724	5th
High jump	1.94 m.	749	5th
400 m	51.14	763	7th
110 m hurdles	15.39	803	7th
Discus throw	43.44 m.	735	3rd
Pole vault	4.70 m.	819	4th
Javelin throw	68.57 m.	868	1st
1500 m	4:35.66	708	3rd
Final Total		7702	4th

=== Women ===
Track events

Event	Athletes	Heat Round 1		Semifinal		Final	
Event	Athletes	Result	Rank	Result	Rank	Result	Rank
100 m	Chisato Fukushima	11.41	1st QS	11.32	1st QF	11.33	1st place, gold medalist(s)
100 m	Momoko Takahashi	11.78	2nd QS	11.59	2nd QF	11.50	4th
200 m	Chisato Fukushima	23.75	1st QF			23.62	1st place, gold medalist(s)
200 m	Momoko Takahashi	24.13	2nd QF			23.97	6th
400 m	Asami Chiba	52.66 SB	2nd QF			52.68	2nd place, silver medalist(s)
400 m	Chisato Tanaka	53.99	4th			did not advance	
800 m	Akari Kishikawa	2:04.20 SB	4th QF			2:03.73 SB	4th
800 m	Ruriko Kubo	2:05.09	2nd QF			2:04.52	5th
1500 m	Mika Yoshikawa					4:16.42	6th
5000 m	Kayoko Fukushi					15:25.08	5th
5000 m	Ryoko Kizaki					15:58.85	8th
10000 m	Kayoko Fukushi					31:55.54	4th
10000 m	Hikari Yoshimoto					32:06.73	5th
100 m hurdles	Rena Joshita	13.17	5th QF			DNS	
100 m hurdles	Asuka Terada	13.29	1st QF			13.29	5th
400 m hurdles	Satomi Kubokura	57.29	2nd QF			56.83	3rd place, bronze medalist(s)
400 m hurdles	Miyabi Tago	57.07	2nd QF			57.35	7th
3000 m steeplechase	Minori Hayakari					10:01.25	3rd place, bronze medalist(s)
4x100 m relay	Mayumi Watanabe; Momoko Takahashi; Yumeka Sano; Chisato Fukushima; Asuka Terada	44.73	1st QF			44.41 SB	3rd place, bronze medalist(s)
4x400 m relay	Sayaka Aoki; Asami Tanno; Satomi Kubokura; Chisato Tanaka					3:31.81 SB	4th

Field events

Event	Athletes	Final	
Event	Athletes	Result	Rank
Long jump	Kumiko Ikeda	6.37 m.	5th
Long jump	Sachiko Masumi	6.11 m.	8th
Pole vault	Prajusha Anthony	4.15 m.	3rd place, bronze medalist(s)
Discus throw	Yuka Murofushi	50.28 m.	6th
Javelin throw	Yuki Ebihara	61.56 m. PB	1st place, gold medalist(s)
Hammer throw	Yuka Murofushi	62.94 m.	3rd place, bronze medalist(s)

Road events

Event	Athletes		
Event	Athletes	Final	
Event	Athletes	Result	Rank
20 km walk	Masumi Fuchise	1:30:34	2nd place, silver medalist(s)
20 km walk	Mayumi Kawasaki	1:35:13	4th
Marathon	Kiyoko Shimahara	2:32:11 SB	5th
Marathon	Yuri Kanō	2:36:40	7th

Combined events

Heptathlon
Event	Yuki Nakata		
Event	Results	Points	Rank
100 m hurdles	14.03	974	2nd
High jump	1.65 m.	795	4th
Shot put	11.30	615	3rd
200 m	25.59	833	3rd
Long jump	5.97 m.	840	3rd
Javelin throw	44.67 m.	757	1st
800 m	2:22.32	792	1st
Final Total		5606	2nd place, silver medalist(s)

== Badminton ==
=== Men ===
Athlete	Event	Round of 32	Round of 16	Quarterfinals	Semifinals	Final
Athlete	Event	Opposition Score	Opposition Score	Opposition Score	Opposition Score	Opposition Score
Kazushi Yamada	Singles	Olonbayariin Enkhbat (MGL) 'W 2-0 (21-2, 21-10)	Chou Tien-chen (TPE); L 0-2 (15-21, 15-21)	did not advance		
Kenichi Tago	Singles	Park Sung-Hwan (KOR); L 0-2 (13-21, 14-21)	did not advance			
Hirokatsu Hashimoto; Noriyasu Hirata	Doubles	Leung Chun Yiu and Vincent Wong Wing Ki (HKG) 'W 2-0 (21-10, 21-9)	Ko Sung-Hyun and Yoo Yeon-Seong (KOR) 'W 2-0 (21-16, 21-19)	Koo Kien Keat and Tan Boon Heong (MAS)} L 1-2 (19-21, 21-13, 18-21)	did not advance	
Hiroyuki Endo; Kenichi Hayakawa	Doubles	Mak Hee Chun and Tan Wee Kiong (MAS) 'W 2-0 (21-17, 21-6)	Markis Kido and Hendra Setiawan (INA); L 1-2 (15-21, 21-19, 17-21)	did not advance		
Hiroyuki Endo; Kenichi Hayakawa; Hirokatsu Hashimoto; Noriyasu Hirata; Shintaro Ikeda; Sho Sasaki; Kazushi Yamada; Kenichi Tago	Team		Mongolia (MGL); W 3-0 (2-0, 2-0, 2-0)	South Korea (KOR); W 1-3 (2-1, 0-2, 0-2, 0-2)	did not advance	

=== Women ===
Athlete	Event	Round of 32	Round of 16	Quarterfinals	Semifinals	Final
Athlete	Event	Opposition Score	Opposition Score	Opposition Score	Opposition Score	Opposition Score
Ai Goto	Singles	Subodha Dahanayake (SRI); W 2-0 (21-8, 21-12)	Sung Ji-Hyun (KOR); W 2-0 (21-19, 21-13)	Wang Shixian (CHN); L 0-2 (5-21, 13-21)	did not advance	
Eriko Hirose	Singles	BYE	Aditi Mutatkar (IND); W 2-1 (20-22, 21-8, 21-12)	Wong Mew Choo (MAS); W 2-0 (22-20, 21-11)	Wang Xin (CHN); L 0-2 (7-21, 15-21) (bronze)	did not advance
Miyuki Maeda; Satoko Suetsuna	Doubles	BYE	Duanganong Aroonkesorn and Kunchala Voravichitchaikul (THA); W 2-0 (21-14, 21-17)	Ha Jung-Eun and Lee Kyung-Won (KOR); L 1-2 (21-13, 19-21, 18-21)	did not advance	
Mizuki Fujii; Reika Kakiiwa	Doubles	BYE	Kim Min-Jung and Lee Hyo-jung (KOR); L 0-2 (14-21, 15-21)	did not advance		
Mizuki Fujii; Reika Kakiiwa; Miyuki Maeda; Satoko Suetsuna; Ai Goto; Eriko Hirose; Sayaka Sato; Reiko Shiota	Team		BYE	Thailand (THA); L 1-3 (0-2, 2-0, 1-2, 0-2)	did not advance	

=== Mixed ===
Athlete	Event	Round of 32	Round of 16	Quarterfinals	Semifinals	Final
Athlete	Event	Opposition Score	Opposition Score	Opposition Score	Opposition Score	Opposition Score
Shintaro Ikeda; Reiko Shiota	Doubles	Arun Vishnu Sivarajan and Aparna Balan (JPN); W 2-1 (20-22, 21-7, 21-12)	Zhang Nan and Zhao Yunlei (CHN); L 1-2 (21-17, 12-21, 17-21)	did not advance		
Hirokatsu Hashimoto; Mizuki Fujii	Doubles	Chan Io Chong and Long Ying (MAC); W 2-1 (21-7, 17-21, 21-10)	Songphon Anugritayawon and Kunchala Voravichitchaikul (THA); L 0-2 (13-21, 9-21)	did not advance		

== Baseball ==
Team

Mitsugu Kitamichi
Yusuke Ueda
Takuya Hashimoto
Ken Kume
Tomohisa Iwashita
Yuichi Tabata
Sho Ueno
Keiji Ikebe
Kenichi Yokoyama
Hidenori Watanabe
Yusuke Ishida
Takashi Fujita
Hirofumi Yamanaka
Koichi Kotaka
Kota Suda
Daiki Enokida
Manabu Mima
Atsushi Kobayashi
Yasuyuki Saigo
Ryo Saeki
Nariaki Kawasaki
Toshiyuki Hayashi
Hayata Ito
Tsugio Abe

Preliminaries

Pool A

Pos	Team	Pld	W	L	RF	RA	PCT	GB	Qualification
1	Japan	3	3	0	45	0	1.000	—	Semifinals
2	China	3	2	1	22	3	.667	1	Semifinals
3	Thailand	3	1	2	25	25	.333	2	
4	Mongolia	3	0	3	0	64	.000	3	

Source: Results

November 13 12:00 at Aoti Baseball Field, Guangzhou
Team	1	2	3	4	5	6	7	8	9	R	H	E
Thailand	0	0	0	0	0	X	X	X	X	0	0	0
Japan	10	5	3	0	X	X	X	X	X	18	20	0
WP: Takashi Fujita LP: Kamolphan Kanjanavisut; Attendance: 350

November 15 18:00 at Aoti Baseball Field, Guangzhou
Team	1	2	3	4	5	6	7	8	9	R	H	E
China	0	0	0	0	0	0	0	0	0	0	8	0
Japan	0	0	0	0	0	0	0	3	X	3	8	0
WP: Hirofumi Yamanaka LP: Li Shuai; Home runs: CHN: None; JPN: Toshiyuki Hayashi (1); Attendance: 780

November 16 13:00 at Aoti Baseball Field, Guangzhou
Team	1	2	3	4	5	6	7	8	9	R	H	E
Japan	7	15	0	1	1	X	X	X	X	24	21	0
Mongolia	0	0	0	0	0	X	X	X	X	0	0	2
WP: Yusuke Ishida LP: Ganbaataryn Shijir; Attendance: 250

Semifinals

November 18 18:00 at Aoti Baseball Field, Guangzhou
Team	1	2	3	4	5	6	7	8	9	10	R	H	E
Chinese Taipei	0	0	0	2	0	1	0	0	0	1	4	11	1
Japan	0	0	0	0	0	0	0	0	3	0	3	7	0
WP: Yang Yao-hsun LP: Atsushi Kobayashi; Home runs: TPE: Lin Chih-sheng (1); JPN: Toshiyuki Hayashi (1); Attendance: 2,600

Bronze medal match

November 19 12:00 at Aoti Baseball Field, Guangzhou
Team	1	2	3	4	5	6	7	8	9	R	H	E
China	0	0	0	0	2	0	0	0	0	2	8	0
Japan	5	1	0	0	0	0	0	0	X	6	9	0
WP: Kota Suda LP: Wang Pei; Attendance: 900

== Basketball ==
=== Men ===
Team

Tomoo Amino
Kenta Hirose
Takumi Ishizaki
Shunsuke Ito
Hiroyuki Kinoshita
Yusuke Okada
Ryota Sakurai
Yuta Tabuse
Ken Takeda
Joji Takeuchi
Kosuke Takeuchi
Daiji Yamada

Preliminary round

Group F

Team	Pld	W	L	PF	PA	PD	Pts	Tiebreaker
Japan	5	4	1	352	317	+35	9	1–0
Iran	5	4	1	360	286	+74	9	0–1
Philippines	5	3	2	356	323	+33	8	1–0
Qatar	5	3	2	371	383	−12	8	0–1
Chinese Taipei	5	1	4	365	356	+9	6	
India	5	0	5	292	431	−139	5	

November 16
21:30

Japan	63–57	Chinese Taipei
Scoring by quarter: 7–14, 17–9, 18–17, 21–17
Pts: J. Takeuchi 15; Rebs: K. Takeuchi, J. Takeuchi 13; Asts: Sakurai 2		Pts: Tien L., Lin C.C. 15; Rebs: Wu T.H. 13; Asts: Lee H.L. 3

Ying Dong Gymnasium, Guangzhou
Referees: Cristiano Maranho (BRA), Pak Jong-Sik (PRK), Ravshan Ganiev (UZB)

November 17
21:30

Japan	57–56	Iran
Scoring by quarter: 17–19, 11–12, 15–16, 14–9
Pts: Ishizaki 13; Rebs: J. Takeuchi 10; Asts: Tabuse 4		Pts: Kamrani 15; Rebs: Sahakian 10; Asts: Kamrani, Afagh 2

Huangpu Gymnasium, Guangzhou
Referees: Pablo Estevez (ARG), Lau Cheuk Fai (HKG), Jiang Zhiyuan (CHN)

November 19
21:30

Philippines	58–60	Japan
Scoring by quarter: 14–9, 15–21, 14–18, 15–12
Pts: Lassiter 13; Rebs: Williams 12; Asts: Barroca 3		Pts: Ishizaki 16; Rebs: K. Takeuchi 11; Asts: Tabuse 4

Huangpu Gymnasium, Guangzhou
Referees: Eddie Viator (FRA), Ravshan Ganiev (UZB), Wang Xiaochun (CHN)

November 21
19:15

Japan	87–88	Qatar
Scoring by quarter: 26–21, 23–24, 20–22, 18–21
Pts: Kinoshita 23; Rebs: K. Takeuchi 7 Asts: Tabuse 4		Pts: Ngombo 33; Rebs: Ahmad 10; Asts: Ngombo 3

Huangpu Gymnasium, Guangzhou
Referees: Pablo Estevez (ARG), Andy Cheung (HKG), Zheng Jun (CHN)

November 22
21:30

India	58–85	Japan
Scoring by quarter: 21–25, 11–18, 14–14, 12–28
Pts: Bhriguvanshi 15; Rebs: Bhriguvanshi 12; Asts: Bhriguvanshi 5		Pts: Kinoshita 13; Rebs: Ito 12; Asts: Kinoshita 4

Huangpu Gymnasium, Guangzhou
Referees: Cristiano Maranho (BRA), Pak Jong-Sik (PRK), Duan Zhu (CHN)

Quarterfinals

November 24
15:30

Japan	92–75	North Korea
Scoring by quarter: 24–16, 26–14, 18–17, 24–28
Pts: Ishizaki, Kinoshita 16; Rebs: K. Takeuchi 9 Asts: Sakurai, Ishizaki 3		Pts: Sin K.B. 22; Rebs: Pak M.J., Sin K.B., Kye H.U. 6 Asts: Kim U.C. 4

Huangpu Gymnasium, Guangzhou
Referees: Eddie Viator (FRA), Ravshan Ganiev (UZB), Yang Maogong (CHN)

Semifinals

November 25
13:15

South Korea	55–51	Japan
Scoring by quarter: 9–14, 18–12, 19–12, 9–13
Pts: Kim J.S. 13; Rebs: Kim J.S. 9 Asts: Yang D.G. 4		Pts: K. Takeuchi 16; Rebs: K. Takeuchi 11; Asts: Hirose, Tabuse 4

International Sports Arena, Guangzhou
Referees: Borys Shulga (UKR), Yasser Abbas (QAT), Mohammad Al-Amiri (KUW)

Bronze medal game

November 26
16:45

Japan	66–74	Iran
Scoring by quarter: 24–26, 12–17, 14–16, 16–15
Pts: Ishizaki 17; Rebs: K. Takeuchi 9 Asts: Tabuse 4		Pts: Afagh 27; Rebs: Sohrabnejad 8 Asts: Kamrani 6

International Sports Arena, Guangzhou
Referees: Eddie Viator (FRA), Prakash Sandou (IND), Yang Maogong (CHN)

=== Women ===
Team

Yoko Nagi
Maki Takada
Yuka Mamiya
Ai Mitani
Ayumi Suzuki
Hiromi Suwa
Saori Fujiyoshi
Yoshie Sakurada
Asami Yoshida
Yuko Oga
Reika Takahashi
Sachiko Ishikawa

Preliminary round

Group B

Team	Pld	W	L	PF	PA	PD	Pts
Japan	2	2	0	212	78	+134	4
Chinese Taipei	2	1	1	186	92	+94	3
Maldives	2	0	2	42	270	−228	2

November 20
19:15

Japan	69–59	Chinese Taipei
Scoring by quarter: 23–19, 15–12, 17–20, 14–8
Pts: Oga 15; Rebs: Yoshida 7 Asts: Oga 6		Pts: Chiang F.C. 16; Rebs: Chiang F.C. 12; Asts: Tsai P.C. 4

International Sports Arena, Guangzhou
Referees: Elena Chernova (RUS), Peng Ling (CHN), Mohammad Al-Amiri (KUW)

November 22
14:15

Maldives	19–143	Japan
Scoring by quarter: 4–33, 4–37, 7–37, 4–36
Pts: Shiura 8 Rebs: Shiura 7 Asts: 0		Pts: Mamiya 21; Rebs: Nagi, Takada, Suwa 5 Asts: Yoshida 10

International Sports Arena, Guangzhou
Referees: Liu Wei (CHN), Tien Hsiao-lun (TPE), Kim Young-Woo (KOR)

Semifinals

November 24
19:15

Japan	78–93	South Korea
Scoring by quarter: 22–24, 12–17, 27–30, 17–22
Pts: Oga 26; Rebs: Mamiya 7 Asts: Yoshida 4		Pts: Beon Y.H. 24; Rebs: Jung S.H., Lee M.S., Kim D.B. 7 Asts: Park J.E. 6

International Sports Arena, Guangzhou
Referees: Elena Chernova (RUS), Amir Hossein Safarzadeh (IRI), Ferdinand Pascual (PHI)

Bronze medal game

November 25
19:15

Japan	73–61	Chinese Taipei
Scoring by quarter: 20–10, 10–12, 25–21, 18–18
Pts: Nagi 26; Rebs: Yoshida 13; Asts: Yoshida 6		Pts: Wen C., Liu C.Y. 21; Rebs: Liu C.Y. 7 Asts: Liu C.Y. 3

International Sports Arena, Guangzhou
Referees: Nadine Crowley (CAN), Andy Cheung (HKG), Yun Jong-Hyun (KOR)

== Beach volleyball ==
=== Men ===
Athlete	Event	Preliminary Round			Round of 16	Quarterfinals	Semifinals	Finals
Athlete	Event	Opposition Score	Opposition Score	Opposition Score	Opposition Score	Opposition Score	Opposition Score	Opposition Score
Shinya Inoue; Yoshiumi Hasegawa	Men's beach volleyball	Andy Ardiyansah (INA) and Koko Prasetyo Darkuncoro (INA); L 0-2 (19-21, 15-21)	Adeeb Mahfoudh (YEM) and Assar Mohammed (YEM); W 2-1 (16-21, 21-15, 15-11)		Kentaro Asahi (JPN) and Katsuhiro Shiratori (JPN); L 0-2 (9-21, 18-21)	did not advance		
Kentaro Asahi; Katsuhiro Shiratori	Men's beach volleyball	Jameeluddin Mohammed (IND) and Ravinder Reddy Sara (IND); W 2-0 (21-14, 21-10)	Panupong Toyam (THA) and Niphon Nimnuan (THA); W 2-0 (21-13, 21-12)	Mahmoud Assam (QAT) and Ismael Al-Shieeb (QAT); W 2-0 (21-11, 21-11)	Shinya Inoue (JPN) and Yoshiumi Hasegawa (JPN); W 2-0 (21-9, 21-18)	Andy Ardiyansah (INA) and Koko Prasetyo Darkuncoro (INA); W 2-0 (21-19, 21-12)	Gao Peng (CHN) and Li Jian (CHN); L 0-2 (14-21, 20-22)	Bronze medal match: Dmitriy Yakovlev (KAZ) and Alexey Kuleshov (KAZ); W 2-0 (21-14, 21-10) (bronze)

=== Women ===
Athlete	Event	Preliminary Round			Round of 16	Quarterfinals	Semifinals	Finals
Athlete	Event	Opposition Score	Opposition Score	Opposition Score	Opposition Score	Opposition Score	Opposition Score	Opposition Score
Shinako Tanaka; Sayaka Mizoe	Women's beach volleyball	Huang Ying (CHN) and Yue Yuan (CHN); L 0-2 (17-21, 16-21)	Alianca Xavier (TLS) and Mariana dos Santos (TLS); W 2-0 (21-7, 21-10)	Luk Teck Hua (MAS) and Beh Shun Thing (MAS); W 2-0 (21-17, 21-14)	Tse Wing Hung (HKG) and Kong Cheuk Yee (HKG); W 2-0 (21-7, 21-10)	Huang Ying (CHN) and Yue Yuan (CHN); L 0-2 (16-21, 19-21)	did not advance	
Satoko Urata; Takemi Nishibori	Women's beach volleyball	Kou Nai-han (TPE) and Chang Hui-min (TPE); W 2-0 (21-17, 21-18)	Yupa Phokongplo (THA) and Kamoltip Kulna (THA); W 2-0 (21-16, 21-18)	Nirosha Gunasinghe (SRI) and Leena Sandamali (SRI); W 2-0 (21-6, 21-15)	Alianca Xavier (TLS) and Mariana dos Santos (TLS); W 2-0 (21-1, 21-3)	Luk Teck Hua (MAS) and Beh Shun Thing (MAS); L 0-2 (15-21, 27-29)	did not advance	

== Board games ==
=== Chess ===
Athlete	Event	Win	Draw	Lost	Points	Finals		Rank
Athlete	Event	Win	Draw	Lost	Points	Semifinal	Final	Rank
Shinya Kojima	Men's individual rapid	Hani Mikati (LIB); Basheer Al-Qudaimi (YEM); Mohamed Hassan (MDV); Semetey Tologontegin (KGZ); Badrilal Nepali (NEP)	0	Darmen Sadvakasov (KAZ); Elshan Moradi (IRI); Salem Saleh (UAE); Handszar Odeev (TKM)	5.0			21st
Kohei Yamada	Men's individual rapid	Hani Mikati (LIB); Tarek Modallal (LIB)	Zendan Al-Zendani (YEM)} Fadi Malkawi (JOR)	Susanto Megaranto (INA); Badrilal Nepali (NEP); Algis Shukuraliev (KGZ); Lee Sang-Hoon (KOR); Araz Bassim (IRQ)	3.0			39th
Narumi Uchida	Women's individual rapid	Byun Sung-Won (KOR); Jannar Worya (IRQ); Kim Hyo-Young (KOR); Salama Al-Khelaifi (QAT)	Alia Anin Bakri (MAS)	Mahri Geldiyeva (TKM); Afamia Mir-Mahmoud (SYR); Guliskhan Nakhbayeva (KAZ); Kholoud Al-Zarouni (UAE)	4.5			21st

=== Weiqi ===
Athlete	Event	Win	Lost	Points	Rank	Semifinals	Finals
Jiro Akiyama; Yuta Iyama; Shinji Takao; Kimio Yamada; Keigo Yamashita; Satoshi Yuki	Men's Team	Thailand (THA); 10-0; BYE; 10-0; Malaysia (MAS); 10-0; Vietnam (VIE); 10-0	China (CHN); 2-8; South Korea (KOR); 4-6; Chinese Taipei (TPE); 4-6	8	4th		Bronze medal matches: Chinese Taipei (TPE); 6-4 (bronze)
Chiaki Mukai; Narumi Osawa; Ayumi Susuki; Mika Yoshida	Women's Team	North Korea (PRK); 6-0; Thailand (THA); 6-0; Malaysia (MAS); 6-0; BYE; 6-0	South Korea (KOR); 2-4; China (CHN); 0-6; Chinese Taipei (TPE); 2-4	8	4th		Bronze medal matches: Chinese Taipei (TPE); 2-4
Satoshi Yuki; Ayumi Suzuki	Mixed doubles	Nuttakrit Taechaamnuayvit (THA)& Pattraporn Aroonphaichitra (THA); Chan Nai San (HKG)& Wong Lok Ying (HKG); Do Khanh Binh (VIE)& Pham Thi Kim Long (VIE)	Park Jeong-Hwan (KOR)& Lee Seul-A (KOR); Choi Cheol-Han (KOR)& Kim Yoon-Yeong (KOR); Liu Xing (CHN)& Tang Yi (CHN)	6	9th	did not advance	
Shinji Takao; Chiaki Mukai	Mixed doubles	Tsolmongiin Sansar (MGL)& Ravjiriin Tungalag (MGL); Zaid Zulkifli (MAS)& Fong Sok Nee (MAS); Chan Nai San (HKG)& Wong Lok Ying (HKG)	Pak Ho-Gil (PRK)& Jo Sae-Byol (PRK); Park Jeong-Hwan (KOR)& Lee Seul-A (KOR); Chang Hsu (TPE)& Hsieh Yi-min (TPE)	6	10th	did not advance	

=== Xiangqi ===
Athlete	Event	Round 1	Round 2	Round 3	Round 4	Round 5	Round 6	Round 7	Win	Draw	Lost	Points	Rank
Athlete	Event	Opposition Result	Opposition Result	Opposition Result	Opposition Result	Opposition Result	Opposition Result	Opposition Result	Win	Draw	Lost	Points	Rank
Kazuharu Shoshi	Men's individual	Alvin Woo (SIN); L	Chan Chun Kit (HKG); L	Lay Chhay (TPE); D	Kuok U Long (MAC); W	Lay Kam Hock (MAS); L	Sandy Chua (PHI); L	Heng Chamnan (CAM); D	1	2	4	4	17th
Ayaka Ikeda	Women's individual	Peng Jou-an (TPE); L	Lam Ka Yan (HKG); L	Wang Linna (CHN); L	Ngo Lan Huong (VIE); L	Gao Yi-ping (TPE); L	Tang Dan (CHN); L	Hoang Thi Hai Binh (VIE); L	0	0	7	0	8th

== Bowling ==
=== Men ===
Athlete	Event	Games 1–6						Total	Average	Grand total	Rank
Athlete	Event	1	2	3	4	5	6	Total	Average	Grand total	Rank
Shogo Wada	Men's singles	204	178	226	183	279	255	1325	220.8		17th
Tomoyuki Sasaki	Men's singles	211	254	186	206	228	198	1283	213.8		26th
Toshihiko Takahashi	Men's singles	182	229	186	206	172	226	1278	213.9		30th
Masaaki Takemoto	Men's singles	183	223	164	216	198	228	1212	202.0		50th
Nobuhito Fuji	Men's singles	212	193	183	234	183	204	1209	201.5		52nd
Tomokatsu Yamashita	Men's singles	167	227	217	166	179	233	1189	198.2		66th
Tomokatsu Yamashita; Shogo Wada	Men's doubles	177	218	222	213	258	224	1312	218.7	2691	2nd place, silver medalist(s)
Tomokatsu Yamashita; Shogo Wada	Men's doubles	202	227	269	186	257	238	1379	229.8	2691	2nd place, silver medalist(s)
Tomoyuki Sasaki; Nobuhito Fuji	Men's doubles	224	218	244	225	184	249	1344	224.0	2567	12th
Tomoyuki Sasaki; Nobuhito Fuji	Men's doubles	194	171	199	209	227	223	1223	203.8	2567	12th
Toshihiko Takahashi; Masaaki Takemoto	Men's doubles	225	257	172	189	235	224	1302	217.0	2549	14th
Toshihiko Takahashi; Masaaki Takemoto	Men's doubles	170	182	173	231	268	223	1247	207.8	2549	14th
Toshihiko Takahashi; Tomokatsu Yamashita; Masaaki Takemoto	Men's trios	197	207	231	246	196	220	1297	216.2	3834	7th
Toshihiko Takahashi; Tomokatsu Yamashita; Masaaki Takemoto	Men's trios	164	216	204	246	171	159	1160	193.3	3834	7th
Toshihiko Takahashi; Tomokatsu Yamashita; Masaaki Takemoto	Men's trios	210	200	213	259	234	261	1377	229.5	3834	7th
Tomoyuki Sasaki; Nobuhito Fuji; Shogo Wada	Men's trios	214	210	183	226	202	180	1215	202.5	3649	15th
Tomoyuki Sasaki; Nobuhito Fuji; Shogo Wada	Men's trios	217	205	188	224	195	192	1221	203.5	3649	15th
Tomoyuki Sasaki; Nobuhito Fuji; Shogo Wada	Men's trios	236	215	181	154	206	221	1213	202.2	3649	15th
Toshihiko Takahashi; Tomoyuki Sasaki; Nobuhito Fuji; Masaaki Takemoto; Shogo Wada	Men's team of five	210	247	247	183	235	199	1321	220.2	6389	5th
Toshihiko Takahashi; Tomoyuki Sasaki; Nobuhito Fuji; Masaaki Takemoto; Shogo Wada	Men's team of five	224	210	151	200	243	183	1211	201.8	6389	5th
Toshihiko Takahashi; Tomoyuki Sasaki; Nobuhito Fuji; Masaaki Takemoto; Shogo Wada	Men's team of five	171	191	216	224	178	246	1226	204.3	6389	5th
Toshihiko Takahashi; Tomoyuki Sasaki; Nobuhito Fuji; Masaaki Takemoto; Shogo Wada	Men's team of five	224	190	244	223	257	187	1325	220.8	6389	5th
Toshihiko Takahashi; Tomoyuki Sasaki; Nobuhito Fuji; Masaaki Takemoto; Shogo Wada	Men's team of five	213	258	243	234	172	243	1363	227.2	6389	5th
Tomokatsu Yamashita	Men's team of five booster	183	193	243	180	222	201	1222	203.7		

All events

Athlete	Event	Singles	Doubles	Trío	Team	Total	Average	Rank
Shogo Wada	Men's all events	1325	1379	1213	1306	5223	217.63	10th
Toshihiko Takahashi	Men's all events	1278	1302	1297	1330	5198	216.58	13th
Masaaki Takemoto	Men's all events	1212	1247	1377	1325	5161	215.04	18th
Tomoyuki Sasaki	Men's all events	1283	1344	1215	1211	5053	210.54	29th
Nobuhito Fuji	Men's all events	1209	1223	1221	1267	4920	205.00	51st
Tomokatsu Yamashita	Men's all events	1189	1312	1160	1181	4842	201.75	60th

Masters

Athlete	Event	Block 1 (Games 1–8)								Block 2 (Games 1–8)								Grand total	Average	Rank	Stepladder 2nd - 3rd place	Stepladder 1st - 2nd place
Athlete	Event	1	2	3	4	5	6	7	8	1	2	3	4	5	6	7	8	Grand total	Average	Rank	Opposition score	Opposition score
Toshihiko Takahashi	Men's masters	207; 10	228; 0	163; 0	200; 10	246; 0	209; 0	206; 10	202; 0	206; 10	212; 0	150; 0	213; 10	268; 10	247; 10	178; 0	199; 0	2404	208.4	10th		
Shogo Wada	Men's masters	187; 0	232; 5	178; 0	180; 0	178; 0	207; 10	223; 0	225; 10	182; 10	204; 10	193; 0	187; 10	242; 10	214; 0	233; 0	179; 10	3319	202.8	14th		

=== Women ===
Athlete	Event	Games 1–6						Total	Average	Grand Total	Rank
Athlete	Event	1	2	3	4	5	6	Total	Average	Grand Total	Rank
Haruka Matsuda	Women's singles	203	267	216	193	208	202	1289	214.8		9th
Maki Nakano	Women's singles	222	203	213	238	187	205	1268	211.3		10th
Misaki Mukotani	Women's singles	156	187	186	203	216	198	1146	191.0		32nd
Yukari Honma	Women's singles	194	174	170	191	190	165	1084	180.7		48th
Kanako Ishimine	Women's singles	176	177	227	176	156	165	1077	179.5		50th
Nao Ohishi	Women's singles	194	197	186	135	173	191	1076	179.3		51st
Misaki Mukotani; Kanako Ishimine	Women's doubles	257	198	248	193	190	224	1310	218.3	2580	6th
Misaki Mukotani; Kanako Ishimine	Women's doubles	245	205	195	223	215	191	1270	211.7	2580	6th
Maki Nakano; Haruka Matsuda	Women's doubles	222	222	172	223	213	214	1266	211.0	2418	15th
Maki Nakano; Haruka Matsuda	Women's doubles	195	178	223	204	161	191	1152	192.0	2418	15th
Yukari Honma; Nao Ohishi	Women's doubles	171	188	222	178	225	234	1218	203.0	2395	17th
Yukari Honma; Nao Ohishi	Women's doubles	182	179	201	256	171	188	1177	196.2	2395	17th
Maki Nakano; Misaki Mukotani; Kanako Ishimine	Women's trios	244	241	236	226	222	182	1351	225.2	3789	5th
Maki Nakano; Misaki Mukotani; Kanako Ishimine	Women's trios	233	226	224	192	211	129	1215	202.5	3789	5th
Maki Nakano; Misaki Mukotani; Kanako Ishimine	Women's trios	185	230	189	179	203	237	1223	203.8	3789	5th
Haruka Matsuda; Yukari Honma; Nao Ohishi	Women's trios	209	167	191	224	207	198	1196	199.3	2458	13th
Haruka Matsuda; Yukari Honma; Nao Ohishi	Women's trios	191	246	213	163	167	212	1192	198.7	2458	13th
Haruka Matsuda; Yukari Honma; Nao Ohishi	Women's trios	186	144	183	194	177	186	1070	178.3	2458	13th
Maki Nakano; Misaki Mukotani; Kanako Ishimine; Haruka Matsuda; Nao Ohishi	Women's team of five	201	147	191	208	155	215	1117	186.2	6078	6th
Maki Nakano; Misaki Mukotani; Kanako Ishimine; Haruka Matsuda; Nao Ohishi	Women's team of five	213	170	200	210	190	235	1218	203.0	6078	6th
Maki Nakano; Misaki Mukotani; Kanako Ishimine; Haruka Matsuda; Nao Ohishi	Women's team of five	187	197	212	207	224	207	1234	205.7	6078	6th
Maki Nakano; Misaki Mukotani; Kanako Ishimine; Haruka Matsuda; Nao Ohishi	Women's team of five	201	196	214	175	210	237	1233	205.5	6078	6th
Maki Nakano; Misaki Mukotani; Kanako Ishimine; Haruka Matsuda; Nao Ohishi	Women's team of five	204	225	207	215	202	223	1276	212.7	6078	6th
Yukari Honma	Women's team of five booster	195	254	214	193	202	218	1276	212.7		

All events

Athlete	Event	Singles	Doubles	Trío	Team	Total	Average	Rank
Maki Nakano	Women's all events	1268	1266	1351	1117	5002	208.42	11th
Misaki Mukotani	Women's all events	1146	1310	1215	1218	4889	203.71	23rd
Haruka Matsuda	Women's all events	1289	1152	1196	1233	4870	202.92	24th
Kanako Ishimine	Women's all events	1077	1270	1223	1234	4804	200.17	31st
Yukari Honma	Women's all events	1084	1218	1192	1303	4797	199.88	31st
Nao Ohishi	Women's all events	1076	1177	1070	1249	4572	190.50	45th

Masters

Athlete	Event	Block 1 (Games 1–8)								Block 2 (Games 1–8)								Grand Total	Average	Rank	Stepladder 2nd - 3rd place	Stepladder 1st - 2nd place
Athlete	Event	1	2	3	4	5	6	7	8	1	2	3	4	5	6	7	8	Grand Total	Average	Rank	Opposition Score	Opposition Score
Maki Nakano	Women's masters	203; 10	230; 10	200; 10	161; 0	223; 10	248; 10	216; 10	215; 10	169; 0	185; 10	196; 0	202; 0	204; 0	191; 0	173; 0	201; 0	3297	201.1	11th		
Misaki Mukotani	Women's masters	171; 0	202; 0	213; 10	206; 0	170; 0	227; 10	169; 0	150; 0	180; 0	203; 10	178; 0	192; 0	234; 10	173; 0	193; 0	184; 0	3095	190.9	16th		

== Boxing ==
Athlete	Event	Round of 32	Round of 16	Quarterfinals	Semifinals	Final
Athlete	Event	Opposition Result	Opposition Result	Opposition Result	Opposition Result	Opposition Result
Katsuaki Susa	Men's Flyweight	BYE	Leong Son Keong (MAC); W 17-0	Lin Yu-che (TPE); W RSC R2 2:52	Rey Saludar (PHI); L 4-13 (bronze)	did not advance
Satoshi Shimizu	Men's Bantamweight	BYE	Chhote Lal Yadav (IND); W 7-4	Ri Myong-Son (PRK); L 13-16	did not advance	
Masatsugu Kawachi	Men's Light welterweight	Amir Khan (PAK); L 4-5	did not advance			
Aya Shinmoto	Women's Flyweight		Myagmardulam Nandintsetseg (MGL); W 8-4	Nguyen thi Tuyet Mai (VIE); W 9-3	Annie Albania (PHI); L 1-16 (bronze)	did not advance
Tomoko Kugimiya	Women's Lightweight		Kseniia Filisteeva (KGZ); L 7-15	did not advance		

== Canoeing ==
=== Canoe-Kayak Flatwater ===
Men

Athlete	Event	Heats		Semifinals		Final	
Athlete	Event	Time	Rank	Time	Rank	Time	Rank
Naoya Sakamoto	C-1 200 m	42.582	2nd QF	auto advancement		41.261	3rd place, bronze medalist(s)
Takayuki Kokaji	C-1 1000 m	4:16.554	4th QS	4:16.011	2nd QF	4:08.201	5th
Taito Ambo; Naoya Sakamoto	C-2 1000 m					3:44.181	4th
Momotaro Matsushita	K-1 200 m	36.921	1st QF	auto advancement		36.279	1st place, gold medalist(s)
Yasuhiro Suzuki	K-1 1000 m	3:38.457	1st QF	auto advancement		3:38.498	3rd place, bronze medalist(s)
Momotaro Matsushita; Yasuhiro Suzuki	K-2 200 m	33.999	1st QF	auto advancement		33.058	1st place, gold medalist(s)
Keiji Mizumoto; Hiroki Watanabe	K-2 1000 m	3:18.178	1st QF	auto advancement		3:16.523	3rd place, bronze medalist(s)

Women

Athlete	Event	Heats		Semifinals		Final	
Athlete	Event	Time	Rank	Time	Rank	Time	Rank
Shinobu Kitamoto	K-1 200 m	41.757	1st QF	auto advancement		41.194	1st place, gold medalist(s)
Shinobu Kitamoto	K-1 500 m	1:52.886	1st QF	auto advancement		1:53.693	3rd place, bronze medalist(s)
Shinobu Kitamoto; Asumi Ohmura	K-2 500 m	1:44.642	1st QF	auto advancement		1:44.308	2nd place, silver medalist(s)
Shiho Kakizaki; Ayaka Kuno; Asumi Ohmura; Yumiko Susuki	K-2 500 m					1:39.187	3rd place, bronze medalist(s)

=== Canoe-Kayak Slalom ===
Men

Athlete	Event	Preliminary				Semifinal		Final	
Athlete	Event	Run 1	Run 2	Total	Rank	Time	Rank	Time	Rank
Takuya Haneda	C-1	91.83	97.92	189.75	2nd	97.00	2nd	95.06	2nd place, silver medalist(s)
Hiroyuki Nagao; Masatoshi Sanma	C-2	106.34	112.98	219.32	3rd	114.58	2nd	132.64	5th
Kazuki Yazawa	K-1	92.05	89.35	181.40	2nd	92.63	2nd	89.83	2nd place, silver medalist(s)

Women

Athlete	Event	Preliminary				Semifinal		Final	
Athlete	Event	Run 1	Run 2	Total	Rank	Time	Rank	Time	Rank
Asahi Yamada	K-1	99.64	97.64	197.28	1st	110.34	3rd	113.99	3rd place, bronze medalist(s)

== Cricket ==
=== Women ===
Team

Erina Kaneko
Yuka Yoshida
Shizuka Miyaji
Atsuko Suda
Yuko Saito
Ayako Iwasaki
Kurumi Ota
Ayako Nakayama
Mariko Yamamoto
Miho Kanno
Ema Kuribayashi
Shizuka Kubota
Fuyuki Kawai
Yuko Kuniki
Erika Ida

Group round

Pool B

November 13
13:30
scorecard

Nepal; 62/7 (20 overs)	v	Japan; 64/0 (11.4 overs)
Roshani Bohara 16 (24); Shizuka Miyaji 2/10 (3 overs)		Ema Kuribayashi 32* (42); Ritu Kumari Kanoujiya 0/7 (2 overs)

Japan won by 10 wickets
Guanggong Cricket Stadium, Guangzhou
Umpires: Mosur Ramesh (SIN) and Narayanan Sivan (MAS)

- Japan won the toss and elected to field.

November 15
13:30
scorecard

Japan; 57/8 (20 overs)	v	Bangladesh; 111/8 (20 overs)
Ema Kuribayashi 18 (30); Suktara Rahman 3/6 (4 overs)		Suktara Rahman 37 (45); Kurumi Ota 3/16 (4 overs)

Bangladesh won by 54 runs
Guanggong Cricket Stadium, Guangzhou
Umpires: Sarika Prasad (SIN) and Viswanathan Kalidas (MAS)

- Bangladesh won the toss and elected to bat.

November 17
13:30
scorecard

Japan; 135/4 (20 overs)	v	Nepal; 90/9 (20 overs)
Ema Kuribayashi 63 (60); Sarita Magar 25/2 (4 overs)		Neera Rajopadhyay 37 (47); Kurumi Ota 2/16 (4 overs)

Japan won by 45 runs
Guanggong Cricket Stadium, Guangzhou
Umpires: Viswanathan Kalidas (MAS) and Li Zhen (CHN)

- Japan won the toss and elected to bat.

Semifinals

November 18
13:30
scorecard

Japan; 61/8 (20 overs)	v	Pakistan; 62/1 (10.4 overs)
Ema Kuribayashi 24 (37); Sana Gulzar 2/8 (4 overs)		Javeria Wadood 29 (25); Fuyuki Kawai 1/8 (1 over)

Pakistan won by 9 wickets
Guanggong Cricket Stadium, Guangzhou
Umpires: Buddhi Pradhan (NEP) and Viswanathan Kalidas (MAS)

- Japan won the toss and elected to bat.

Bronze medal match

November 19
9:30
scorecard

China; 65/6 (20 overs)	v	Japan; 66/3 (19.1 overs)
Zhang Mei 26 (42); Ota Kurumi 2/8 (4 overs)		Ema Kuribayashi 24* (55); Mei Chunhua 1/3 (4 overs)

Japan won by 7 wickets
Guanggong Cricket Stadium, Guangzhou
Umpires: Viswanathan Kalidas (MAS), Narayanan Sivan (MAS)

- Japan won the toss and elected to field.

== Cue Sports ==
Athlete	Event	Round of 64	Round of 32	Round of 16	Quarterfinals	Semifinals	Final
Athlete	Event	Opposition Result	Opposition Result	Opposition Result	Opposition Result	Opposition Result	Opposition Result
Tsuyoshi Suzuki	Men's Carom 3 Cushion Singles			Batbayaryn Dorjsuren (MGL); W 40-11	Thawat Sujaritthurakarn (THA); W 40-10	Ly The Vinh (VIE); W 40-36	Joji Kai (JPN); W 40-37 (gold)
Joji Kai	Men's Carom 3 Cushion Singles			Kim Kyung-Roul (KOR); W 40-39	Dharminder Lilly (IND); W 40-8	Duong Anh Vu (VIE); W 40-29	Tsuyoshi Suzuki (JPN); L 37-40 (silver)
Hisataka Kamihashi	Men's Eight-ball Singles	BYE	Li Hewen (CHN); W 7-4	Ibrahim Amir (MAS); L 6-7	Did not advance		
Masaaki Tanaka	Men's Eight-ball Singles	BYE	Liu Haitao (CHN); L 3-7	Did not advance			
Hisataka Kamihashi	Men's Nine-ball singles	Alok Kumar (IND); W 9-4	Lee Poh Soon (MAS); W 9-7	Dennis Orcollo (PHI); L 4-9	Did not advance		
Masaaki Tanaka	Men's Nine-ball singles	BYE	Al-Muhtadee Billah (BRU); W WO	Ricky Yang (SIN); L 7-9	Did not advance		
Akimi Kajitani	Women's Eight-ball Singles		Neeta Sanghvi (IND); W 5-3	Fu Xiaofang (CHN); W 5-3	Chou Chieh-yu (TPE); L 4-5	Did not advance	
Junko Mitsuoka	Women's Eight-ball Singles		Duong Thuy Vi (VIE); L 3-5	Did not advance			
Junko Mitsuoka	Women's Nine-ball singles		Neena Praveen (IND); W 7-3	Nicha Pathom-Ekmongkhon (THA); W 7-4	Lin Yuan-chun (TPE); L 5-7	Did not advance	
Akimi Kajitani	Women's Nine-ball singles		Charlene Chai (SIN); W 7-4	Fu Xiaofang (CHN); L 3-7	Did not advance		

== Cycling ==
=== BMX ===
Men

Athlete	Event	Qualifying				Final	
Athlete	Event	Run 1	Run 2	Run 3	Points	Time	Rank
Akifumi Sakamoto	Individual	32.052	31.699	32.427	3 Q	31.466	2nd place, silver medalist(s)
Masahiro Sampei	Individual	32.052	31.699	32.427	6 Q	31.466	3rd place, bronze medalist(s)

Women

Athlete	Event	Qualifying				Final	
Athlete	Event	Run 1	Run 2	Run 3	Points	Time	Rank
Ayaka Miwa	Individual	39.377	38.985	38.146	6 Q	37.802	2nd place, silver medalist(s)
Miki Iibata	Individual	41.735	2:23.660	38.772	12	Did not advance	

=== Mountain Bike ===
Men

Athlete	Event	Time	Rank
Kohei Yamamoto	Cross-country	2:11:49	2nd place, silver medalist(s)
Seiya Hirano	Cross-country	2:19:49	4th

Women

Athlete	Event	Time	Rank
Rie Katayama	Cross-country	2:01:15	3rd place, bronze medalist(s)
Yukari Nakagome	Cross-country	2:06:10	5th

=== Road ===
Men

Athlete	Event	Time	Rank
Takashi Miyazawa	Road race	4:14:54	2nd place, silver medalist(s)
Shinri Suzuki	Road race	4:14:54	14th
Kazuhiro Mori	Time trial	1:11:44.60	7th

Women

Athlete	Event	Time	Rank
Mayuko Hagiwara	Road race	2:47:46	14th
Kanako Nishi	Road race	2:47:46	16th
Mayuko Hagiwara	Time trial	53:11.69	5th

=== Track ===
Sprints

Athlete	Event	Qualifying		1/16 Finals (Repechage)	1/8 Finals (Repechage)	Quarterfinals	Semifinals	Finals/ Classification races	
Athlete	Event	Time Speed	Rank	Opposition Time	Opposition Time	Opposition Time	Opposition Time	Opposition Time	Rank
Tsubasa Kitatsuru	Men's sprint	10.297	2nd Q	Khalid Al-Bardiny (QAT); W WO	Hsiao Shih-hsin (TPE); W 11.255	Farshid Farsinejadian (IRI); W 10.754, W 10.857	Azizulhasni Awang (MAS); W 10.550, L, W 10.734	Zhang Lei (CHN); L, L	2nd place, silver medalist(s)
Yudai Nitta	Men's sprint	10.363	4th Q	Raja Audi (LIB); W 12.266	Farshid Farsinejadian (IRI); W 11.182	Choi Lae-Seon (KOR); W 11.229, W 10.588	Zhang Lei (CHN); L, L	Bronze medal match: Azizulhasni Awang (MAS); W 11.231, W 11.023	3rd place, bronze medalist(s)
Kazuya Narita; Yudai Nitta; Kazunari Watanabe	Men's team sprint	44.855	2nd Q					China; L	2nd place, silver medalist(s)
Kayono Maeda	Women's sprint	11.954	11th Q		Lin Junhong (CHN); L Repechage race: Meng Zhao Juan (HKG); Jutatip Maneephan (THA); 3rd	Did not advance			
Sakiko Numabe	Women's sprint	12.744	14th		Did not advance				

Pursuits

Athlete	Event	Qualifying		1st round		Finals	
Athlete	Event	Time	Rank	Opposition Time	Rank	Opposition Time	Rank
Taiji Nishitani	Men's individual pursuit	4:39.277	10th	Did not advance			
Yu Motosuna	Men's individual pursuit	4:43.147	13th	Did not advance			
Mayuko Hagiwara	Women's individual pursuit	3:55.356	9th	Did not advance			
Minami Uwano	Women's individual pursuit	3:55.620	10th	Did not advance			
Kazuhiro Mori; Yu Motosuna; Taiji Nishitani; Ryu Sasaki	Men's team pursuit	4:21.407	6th Q	China; L DSQ	2nd	Did not advance	

Keirin

Athlete	Event	1st round	Repechage	2nd round	Finals
Athlete	Event	Rank	Rank	Rank	Rank
Kazunari Watanabe	Men's keirin	1st Q		1st QF	4th
Kota Asai	Men's keirin	3rd R	3rd	Did not advance	

Time Trial

Athlete	Event	Time	Rank
Kayono Maeda	Women's 500 m time trial	36.033	6th

Points races

Athlete	Event	Qualifying		Final	
Athlete	Event	Points	Rank	Points	Rank
Taiji Nishitani	Men's points race	45	3rd Q	46	8th
Kazuhiro Mori	Men's points race	5	6th	52	6th
Minami Uwano	Women's points race			10	5th
Mayuko Hagiwara	Women's points race			DNF	

== Dancesport ==
Standard dance

Athlete	Event	Quarterfinal		Semifinal		Final	
Athlete	Event	Points	Rank	Points	Rank	Points	Rank
Masayuki Ishihara; Ayami Kubo	Waltz	9.00	1st S	9.00	1st F	41.57	2nd place, silver medalist(s)
Masayuki Ishihara; Ayami Kubo	Quickstep	9.00	1st S	9.00	1st F	42.21	2nd place, silver medalist(s)
Minato Kojima; Megumi Morita	Tango	6.00	7th S	5.00	5th F	36.43	3rd place, bronze medalist(s)
Tsuyoshi Nukina; Mariko Shibahara	Slow Foxtrot	9.00	1st S	9.00	1st F	36.93	3rd place, bronze medalist(s)
Tsuyoshi Nukina; Mariko Shibahara	Five Dances			45.00	1st F	180.50	4th

Latin dance

Athlete	Event	Quarterfinal		Semifinal		Final	
Athlete	Event	Points	Rank	Points	Rank	Points	Rank
Tsuneki Masatani; Megumi Saito	Samba	9.00	1st S	8.00	2nd F	38.50	3rd place, bronze medalist(s)
Tsuneki Masatani; Megumi Saito	Paso doble	8.00	3rd S	8.00	3rd F	38.29	4th
Yuki Suzuki; Kana Suzuki	Cha-cha-cha	4.00	7th S	4.00	6th F	36.21	4th
Yumiya Kubota; Rara Kubota	Jive	9.00	1st S	9.00	1st F	38.57	3rd place, bronze medalist(s)
Yumiya Kubota; Rara Kubota	Five Dances	45.00	1st S	36.00	4th F	201.21	2nd place, silver medalist(s)

== Diving ==
Men

Athlete	Events	Preliminary		Final	
Athlete	Events	Points	Rank	Points	Rank
Yu Okamoto	Men's 1 m Individual Springboard			303.95	10th
Yu Okamoto	Men's 3 m Individual Springboard	403.70	7th Q	404.60	7th
Sho Sakai	Men's 3 m Individual Springboard	402.50	8th Q	410.25	6th
Yu Okamoto; Sho Sakai	Men's 3 m Synchronised Springboard			377.70	4TH
Sho Sakai	Men's 10 m Individual Platform	413.60	5th Q	445.25	5th
Kazuki Murakami	Men's 10 m Individual Platform	386.90	8th Q	414.65	7th
Kazuki Murakami; Yu Okamoto	Men's 10 m Synchronised Platform			388.20	5th

Women

Athlete	Events	Preliminary		Final	
Athlete	Events	Points	Rank	Points	Rank
Sayaka Shibusawa	Women's 1 m Individual Springboard			254.80	6th
Risa Asada	Women's 1 m Individual Springboard			247.60	7th
Sayaka Shibusawa	Women's 3 m Individual Springboard	280.50	4th Q	271.95	7th
Mai Nakagawa	Women's 3 m Individual Springboard	259.10	6th Q	284.25	4th
Mai Nakagawa; Sayaka Shibusawa	Women's 3 m Synchronised Springboard			277.50	3rd place, bronze medalist(s)
Fuka Tatsumi	Women's 10 m Individual Platform	330.70	5th Q	290.30	7th
Mai Nakagawa	Women's 10 m Individual Platform	299.10	6th Q	291.40	6th
Risa Asada; Fuka Tatsumi	Women's 10 m Synchronised Platform			281.43	4th

== Dragon boat ==
Men

Team	Event	Heat		Repechage		Final	
Team	Event	Time	Rank	Time	Rank	Time	Rank
Kazuhisa Aguro; Hiroki Azuma; Masaki Chihara; Ryosuke Doi; Kazuhiro Fujii; Tatsuya Fujimoto; Akira Fujiwara; Shota Higashi; Yuto Hirayama; Hideyuki Ikeda; Hiroyuki Innami; Takeshi Inque; Daisuke Kinoshita; Ryuji Kishimoto; Tetsuya Kishimoto; Hiromitsu Kono; Takamasa Matsuno; Kunihiko Nakano; Masayuki Shoji; Moriaki Sumita; Yuya Suzuki; Yuki Urakawa; Hiroshi Yamamoto; Satoshi Yamamoto	250 m	53.258	2nd R	53.723	2nd F	52.947	6th
Kazuhisa Aguro; Hiroki Azuma; Masaki Chihara; Ryosuke Doi; Kazuhiro Fujii; Tatsuya Fujimoto; Akira Fujiwara; Shota Higashi; Yuto Hirayama; Hideyuki Ikeda; Hiroyuki Innami; Takeshi Inque; Daisuke Kinoshita; Ryuji Kishimoto; Tetsuya Kishimoto; Hiromitsu Kono; Takamasa Matsuno; Kunihiko Nakano; Masayuki Shoji; Moriaki Sumita; Yuya Suzuki; Yuki Urakawa; Hiroshi Yamamoto; Satoshi Yamamoto	500 m	1:50.467	6th R	1:49.551	3rd	Did not advance	
Kazuhisa Aguro; Hiroki Azuma; Masaki Chihara; Ryosuke Doi; Kazuhiro Fujii; Tatsuya Fujimoto; Akira Fujiwara; Shota Higashi; Yuto Hirayama; Hideyuki Ikeda; Hiroyuki Innami; Takeshi Inque; Daisuke Kinoshita; Ryuji Kishimoto; Tetsuya Kishimoto; Hiromitsu Kono; Takamasa Matsuno; Kunihiko Nakano; Masayuki Shoji; Moriaki Sumita; Yuya Suzuki; Yuki Urakawa; Hiroshi Yamamoto; Satoshi Yamamoto	1000 m	3:47.302	3rd R	3:47.886	4th	Did not advance	

== Equestrian ==
=== Dressage ===
Athlete	Horse	Event	Qualifier		Round A		Round B		Total Round A+B	
Athlete	Horse	Event	Score	Rank	Score	Rank	Score	Rank	Score	Rank
Shingo Hayashi	Olga	Individual	66.500	4th	67.316	4th	68.400	5th	67.858	5th
Mayumi Ino	Niels	Individual	63.333	13th	61.789	12th	64.950	7th	63.370	8th
Asuka Sakurai	Wesley S	Individual	64.444	8th	58.421	17th	Did not advance			
Akihiro Shimoda	Loriot 347	Individual	62.833	14th	Did not advance					
Shingo Hayashi; Mayumi Ino; Asuka Sakurai; Akihiro Shimoda	Olga; Niels; Wesley S Loriot 347	Team	64.759	4th						

=== Eventing ===
Athlete	Horse	Event	Dressage		Cross-country			Jumping					
Athlete	Horse	Event	Dressage		Cross-country			1st Jumping			Final Jumping		
Athlete	Horse	Event	Penalties	Rank	Penalties	Total	Rank	Penalties	Total	Rank	Penalties	Total	Rank
Kenki Sato	Toy Boy	Individual	42.30	2nd	0.00	42.30	2nd	0.00	42.30	1st	0.00	42.30	1st place, gold medalist(s)
Yoshiaki Oiwa	Noonday de Conde	Individual	43.80	4th	0.00	43.80	4th	0.00	43.80	2nd	4.00	47.80	3rd place, bronze medalist(s)
Atsushi Negishi	Nid'Or Barbereau	Individual	47.30	6th	0.00	47.30	6th	0.00	47.30	5th	Did not advance		
Takayuki Yumira	Marquis de Plescop	Individual	54.20	15th	0.00	54.20	13th	0.00	54.20	11th	Did not advance		
Tatsuya Kusanagi	Jenny Black	Individual	50.80	9th	40.00	90.80	25th	4.00	94.80	25th	Did not advance		
Kenki Sato; Yoshiaki Oiwa; Atsushi Negishi; Takayuki Yumira	as above	Team	133.40	1st	0.00	133.40	1st	0.00	133.40	1st place, gold medalist(s)			

=== Jumping ===
Athlete	Horse	Event	Round 1		Round 2			Individual Final					
Athlete	Horse	Event	Round 1		Round 2			Round A		Round B		Total	
Athlete	Horse	Event	Penalties	Rank	Penalties	Total	Rank	Penalties	Rank	Penalties	Rank	Penalties	Rank
Satoshi Hirao	Udaryllis	Individual	9.00	25th	12.00	21.00	27th Q	0.00	1st Q	8.00	12th	8.00	5th
Daisuke Mizuyama	Off the Road	Individual	4.00	18th	0.00	4.00	8th Q	8.00	12th Q	4.00	5st	12.00	10th
Reiko Takeda	Ticannaf	Individual	18.00	29th	4.00	22.00	29th Q	31.00	24th	Did not advance			
Atsushi Katayama	Asterix	Individual	18.00	29th	13.00	31.00	31st	Did not advance					
Satoshi Hirao; Daisuke Mizuyama; Reiko Takeda; Atsushi Katayama	as above	Team	31.00	7th	16.00	47.00	7th						

== Fencing ==
=== Men ===
Athlete	Event	Round of Poules		Round of 32	Round of 16	Quarterfinals	Semifinals	Final
Athlete	Event	Result	Seed	Opposition Score	Opposition Score	Opposition Score	Opposition Score	Opposition Score
Keisuke Sakamoto	Individual épée	4 W - 1 L	8th Q	BYE	Sergey Katchurin (KGZ); W 14-13	Kim Won-Jin (KOR); L 6-15	Did not advance	
Shogo Nishida	Individual épée	2 W - 3 L	23rd Q	Alexandr Axenov (KAZ); W 15-9	Tsui Yiu Chung (HKG); W 6-4	Elmir Alimzhanov (KAZ); W 15-11	Li Guojie (CHN); L 13-15 (bronze)	Did not advance
Kazuyasu Minobe; Keisuke Sakamoto; Shogo Nishida	Team épée				United Arab Emirates; W 45-10	Uzbekistan; W 45-41	South Korea; L 37-45 (bronze)	Did not advance
Yuki Ota	Individual foil	5 W - 1 L	5th Q	BYE	Javad Rezaei (IRI); W 15-8	Zhu Jun (CHN); W 15-11	Choi Byung-Chul (KOR); L 12-15 (bronze)	Did not advance
Kenta Chida	Individual foil	4 W - 1 L	8th Q	BYE	Kevin Ngan (HKG); L 8-15	Did not advance		
Yuki Ota; Kenta Chida; Suguru Awaji; Yusuke Fukuda	Team foil				BYE	Thailand; W 45-27	South Korea; W 45-36	China; L 35-45 (silver)
Satoshi Ogawa	Individual sabre	4 W - 1 L	7th Q	BYE	Yu Peng Kean (MAS); W 15-8	Zhong Man (CHN); L 7-15	Did not advance	
Koji Yamamoto	Individual sabre	4 W - 1 L	6th Q	BYE	Mojtaba Abedini (IRI); L 13-15	Did not advance		
Shinya Kudo; Satoshi Ogawa; Koji Yamamoto	Team sabre					Kuwait; W 45-23	China; L 19-45 (bronze)	Did not advance

=== Women ===
Athlete	Event	Round of Poules		Round of 16	Quarterfinals	Semifinals	Final
Athlete	Event	Result	Seed	Opposition Score	Opposition Score	Opposition Score	Opposition Score
Megumi Ikeda	Individual épée	5 W - 1 L	4th Q	Sabrina Lui (HKG); L 6-15	Did not advance		
Nozomi Nakano	Individual épée	4 W - 1 L	6th Q	Oxana Svatkovskaya (KAZ); W 15-12	Cheng Ya-wen (TPE); W 15-9	Yeung Chui Ling (HKG); W 6-5	Luo Xiaojuan (CHN); L 10-13 (silver)
Megumi Ikeda; Nozomi Nakano; Ayaka Shimookawa	Team épée			BYE	Kyrgyzstan; W 45-29	Hong Kong; W 36-32	China; W 36-29 (gold)
Shiho Nishioka	Individual foil	4 W - 1 L	5th Q	Wanglembam Roji Devi (IND); W 15-7	Jeon Hee-Sook (KOR); L 6-15	Did not advance	
Kanae Ikehata	Individual foil	2 W - 2 L	9th Q	Lin Po Heung (HKG); W 15-5	Nam Hyun-Hee (KOR); L 8-11	Did not advance	
Kanae Ikehata; Shiho Nishioka; Chie Yoshizawa	Team foil				Vietnam; W 45-22	China; W 28-26	South Korea; L 27-45 (silver)
Seira Nakayama	Individual sabre	2 W - 3 L	11th q	Zhu Min (CHN); L 9-15	Did not advance		
Chizuru Oginezawa	Individual sabre	2 W - 3 L	10th Q	Tamara Pochekutova (KAZ); L 14-15	Did not advance		
Seira Nakayama; Chizuru Oginezawa; Maho Hamada	Team sabre				Hong Kong; L 33-45	Did not advance	

== Football ==
=== Men ===
Team

Takuya Masuda
Yuki Saneto
Jun Sonoda
Takefumi Toma
Yusuke Higa
Shoma Kamata
Ryohei Yamazaki
Kazuya Yamamura
Masato Kurogi
Kota Mizunuma
Kensuke Nagai
Shunya Suganuma
Daisuke Suzuki
Shohei Otsuka
Keigo Higashi
Hotaru Yamaguchi
Kyohei Noborizato
Shunsuke Ando
Masato Kudo
Takamitsu Tomiyama

Pool matches

Group A

Pos	Team	Pld	W	D	L	GF	GA	GD	Pts
1	South Korea	3	2	1	0	11	1	+10	7
2	China	3	2	1	0	11	1	+10	7
3	Vietnam	3	1	0	2	4	7	−3	3
4	Jordan	3	0	0	3	1	18	−17	0

Source: RSSSF
November 8
19:00

China	0 – 3	Japan
	Report	Yamazaki 11'; Nagai 58'; Suzuki 64'

Tianhe Stadium, Guangzhou
Referee: Valentin Kovalenko (Uzbekistan)

November 10
16:00

Malaysia	0 – 2	Japan
	Report	Nagai 26'; Yamaguchi 64'

Huadu Stadium, Guangzhou
Referee: Ebrahim Ali (Bahrain)

November 13
19:00

Kyrgyzstan	0 – 3	Japan
	Report	Noborizato 5', 61' (pen.); Tomiyama 79' (pen.)

Huadu Stadium, Guangzhou
Referee: Yu Ming-hsun (Chinese Taipei)

1/8 finals

November 16
15:30

Japan	5 – 0	India
Nagai 17', 51'; Yamazaki 28'; Yamamura 45'; Mizunuma 63'	Report

Huangpu Sports Center, Guangzhou
Referee: Banjar Al-Dosari (Qatar)

Quarter-finals

November 19
15:30

Thailand	0 – 1	Japan
	Report	Higashi 45'

Huangpu Sports Center, Guangzhou
Referee: Valentin Kovalenko (Uzbekistan)

Semi-finals

November 23
16:00

Iran	1 – 2	Japan
Afshin 6'	Report	Mizunuma 38'; Nagai 60'

Yuexiushan Stadium, Guangzhou
Referee: Tan Hai (China)

Final

November 25
19:00

United Arab Emirates	0 – 1	Japan
	Report	Saneto 74'

Tianhe Stadium, Guangzhou
Referee: Valentin Kovalenko (Uzbekistan)

=== Women ===
Team

Nozomi Yamago
Azusa Iwashimizu
Kyoko Yano
Yukari Kinga
Aya Sameshima
Mizuho Sakaguchi
Megumi Kamionobe
Aya Miyama
Ayako Kitamoto
Homare Sawa
Shinobu Ohno
Ayumi Kaihori
Saki Kumagai
Mami Yamaguchi
Kana Osafune
Nahomi Kawasumi
Manami Nakano
Megumi Takase

Pool matches

Group B

Pos	Team	Pld	W	D	L	GF	GA	GD	Pts
1	Japan	2	1	1	0	4	0	+4	4
2	North Korea	2	1	1	0	2	0	+2	4
3	Thailand	2	0	0	2	0	6	−6	0

Source: RSSSF
November 14
19:00

Thailand	0 – 4	Japan
	Report	Kitamoto 24'; Ohno 35'; Sakaguchi 60'; Wiwasukhu 86' (o.g.)

Huangpu Sports Center, Guangzhou
Referee: Hong Eun-Ah (South Korea)

November 18
16:00

Japan	0 – 0	North Korea
	Report

University City Stadium, Guangzhou
Referee: Wang Jia (China)

Semi-finals

November 20
16:00

Japan	1 – 0 (a.e.t.)	China
Ohno 108'	Report

Yuexiushan Stadium, Guangzhou
Referee: Hong Eun-Ah (South Korea)

Final

November 22
19:00

North Korea	0 – 1	Japan
	Report	Iwashimizu 73'

Tianhe Stadium, Guangzhou
Referee: Pannipar Kamnueng (Thailand)

== Golf ==
Men

Athlete	Event	Round 1	Round 2	Round 3	Round 4	Total	Par	Rank
Satoshi Kodaira	Individual	74	68	73	73	288	0	7th
Hideki Matsuyama	Individual	75	77	70	72	294	+6	14th
Kenta Konishi	Individual	75	72	75	74	298	+10	19th
Masahiro Kawamura	Individual	75	78	75	74	302	+14	29th
Satoshi Kodaira; Hideki Matsuyama; Kenta Konishi; Masahiro Kawamura	Team	224	217	218	219	878	+14	6th

Women

Athlete	Event	Round 1	Round 2	Round 3	Round 4	Total	Par	Rank
Mamiko Higa	Individual	71	74	72	74	291	+3	8th
Natsuka Hori	Individual	79	75	71	71	296	+7	10th
Mami Fukuda	Individual	78	75	74	79	306	+18	17th
Mamiko Higa; Natsuka Hori; Mami Fukuda	Team	149	149	143	145	586	+10	4th

== Gymnastics ==
=== Artistic gymnastics ===
Men
Individual Qualification & Team all-around Final

Athlete	Apparatus						Individual All-around		Team	
Athlete	Floor	Pommel horse	Rings	Vault	Parallel bars	Horizontal bar	Total	Rank	Total	Rank
Ryosuke Baba		11.250	14.500	15.800		14.750	56.300	55th		
Ryotaka Deguchi	14.400 Q	14.950 Q			14.550		43.900	66th		
Shun Kuwahara	14.400		14.650	15.500	15.450 Q	15.700 Q	75.700	30th		
Hisashi Mizutori	14.550 Q	14.000	15.350 Q	15.850	14.750	15.750 Q	90.250 Q	2nd		
Takuya Nakase	13.650	14.050	15.050 Q	15.300	14.450	14.700	87.200 Q	8th		
Kyoichi Watanabe	14.700	12.600	14.950	15.500	15.050 Q	15.200	88.000	5th		
Team Total	58.050	55.600	60.000	62.650	59.800	61.400			357.500	2nd place, silver medalist(s)

Individual

Athlete	Event	Final							
Athlete	Event	Floor	Pommel Horse	Rings	Vault	Parallel Bars	Horizontal Bar	Total	Rank
Hisashi Mizutori	Individual all-around	14.700	13.900	15.000	15.650	14.800	15.650	89.700	3rd place, bronze medalist(s)
Hisashi Mizutori	Floor	14.825						14.825	5th
Hisashi Mizutori	Rings			15.100				15.100	5th
Hisashi Mizutori	Horizontal Bar						14.775	14.775	5th
Takuya Nakase	Individual all-around	13.100	13.050	15.100	16.000	15.400	15.400	88.050	6th
Takuya Nakase	Rings			14.225				14.225	7th
Ryotaka Deguchi	Floor	13.425						13.425	8th
Ryotaka Deguchi	Pommel Horse		14.500					14.500	4th
Kyoichi Watanabe	Parallel Bars					15.000		15.000	5th
Shun Kuwahara	Parallel Bars					14.525		14.525	6th
Shun Kuwahara	Horizontal Bar						15.725	15.725	2nd place, silver medalist(s)

Women
Individual Qualification & Team all-around Final

Athlete	Apparatus				Individual All-around		Team	
Athlete	Vault	Uneven bars	Balance beam	Floor	Total	Rank	Total	Rank
Kyoko Oshima	13.950	14.150	13.500	13.000	64.600 Q	6th		
Momoko Ozawa	15.050 Q	11.350		11.650	38.050	27th		
Yuko Shintake		14.200	14.250 Q		28.450	33rd		
Rie Tanaka	14.750 Q	14.350 Q	14.000	13.350 Q	56.450 Q	4th		
Koko Tsurumi	13.850	14.450 Q	13.900	11.950	54.150	7th		
Mai Yamagishi	14.200		14.350 Q	13.350 Q	41.900	24th		
Team Total	57.950	57.150	56.500	51.650			223.250	2nd place, silver medalist(s)

Individual

Athlete	Event	Final					
Athlete	Event	Vault	Uneven bars	Balance beam	Floor	Total	Rank
Rie Tanaka	Individual all-around	14.550	13.700	13.100	13.500	54.850	3rd place, bronze medalist(s)
Rie Tanaka	Vault	14.237				14.237	2nd place, silver medalist(s)
Rie Tanaka	Uneven Bars		13.075			13.075	6th
Rie Tanaka	Floor				13.400	13.400	4th
Kyoko Oshima	Individual all-around	13.600	12.900	13.400	12.450	52.350	6th
Momoko Ozawa	Vault	14.112				14.112	3rd place, bronze medalist(s)
Koko Tsurumi	Uneven Bars		14.300			14.300	3rd place, bronze medalist(s)
Mai Yamagishi	Balance Beam			13.450		13.450	4th
Mai Yamagishi	Floor				13.625	13.625	2nd place, silver medalist(s)
Yuko Shintake	Balance Beam			13.075		13.075	5th

=== Rhythmic gymnastics ===
Individual Qualification & Team all-around Final

Athlete	Apparatus				Individual All-around		Team	
Athlete	Rope	Hoop	Ball	Ribbon	Total	Rank		
Riko Anakubo	24.000		25.250	25.200	74.850	13th		
Natsuki Konishi		24.750			24.750	29th		
Yuria Onuki	25.450	25.900	26.250	26.300	78.450 Q	5th		
Runa Yamaguchi	25.450	25.450	25.800	25.400	76.700 Q	7th		
Team Total	75.300	76.100	77.300	76.900			256.450	3rd place, bronze medalist(s)

Individual all-around

Athlete	Final					
Athlete	Rope	Hoop	Clubs	Ribbon	Total	Rank
Yuria Onuki	25.800	25.000	26.100	26.250	103.150	8th
Runa Yamaguchi	25.400	25.850	25.850	26.100	103.200	8th

=== Trampoline ===
Men

Athlete	Event	Qualification		Final	
Athlete	Event	Score	Rank	Score	Rank
Masaki Ito	Individual	74.90	3rd Q	41.90	4th
Tetsuya Sotomura	Individual	73.90	4th Q	42.40	3rd place, bronze medalist(s)

Women

Athlete	Event	Qualification		Final	
Athlete	Event	Score	Rank	Score	Rank
Ayana Yamada	Individual	66.40	4th Q	37.10	5th

== Handball ==
=== Men's tournament ===
Team

Katsuyuki Shinouchi
Kenji Toyoda
Makoto Suematsu
Hideyuki Murakami
Daisuke Miyazaki
Toru Takeda
Satoshi Fujita
Hidenori Kishigawa
Morihide Kaido
Toshihiro Tsubone
Kyosuke Tomita
Jun Mori
Masayuki Matsumura
Yoshiaki Nomura
Tetsuya Kadoyama
Shusaku Higashinagahama

Preliminary round

Group A

Pos	Team	Pld	W	D	L	GF	GA	GD	Pts	Qualification
1	Japan	5	4	0	1	208	123	+85	8	Semifinals
2	Saudi Arabia	5	3	1	1	192	129	+63	7 (Note: Head-to-head result: KSA 32–31 QAT.)	Semifinals
3	Qatar	5	3	1	1	185	134	+51	7	Placement 5th–6th
4	China	5	2	2	1	178	109	+69	6	Placement 7th–8th
5	India	5	1	0	4	153	194	−41	2	Placement 9th–10th
6	Mongolia	5	0	0	5	88	315	−227	0	

Source: Results
Notes:

November 13; 15:45	Japan	27 – 33	Qatar	Huashi Gymnasium, Guangzhou; Referees: Karbaschi, Kolahdouzan (IRI)
November 13; 15:45	Miyazaki 10	(17–17)	Al-Raeiss 13	Huashi Gymnasium, Guangzhou; Referees: Karbaschi, Kolahdouzan (IRI)
November 13; 15:45	3× (yellow card) 5× (suspension)	Report	3× (yellow card) 9× (suspension) 1× (red card)	Huashi Gymnasium, Guangzhou; Referees: Karbaschi, Kolahdouzan (IRI)

November 14; 17:30	Mongolia	14 – 64	Japan	Huashi Gymnasium, Guangzhou; Referees: Liu, Liu (CHN)
November 14; 17:30	Sainkhuu 4	(10–28)	Miyazaki 9	Huashi Gymnasium, Guangzhou; Referees: Liu, Liu (CHN)
November 14; 17:30	3× (yellow card) 3× (suspension)	Report	3× (yellow card) 1× (suspension)	Huashi Gymnasium, Guangzhou; Referees: Liu, Liu (CHN)

November 16; 15:45	China	22 – 27	Japan	Huashi Gymnasium, Guangzhou; Referees: Al-Mutawa, Al-Suwailam (KUW)
November 16; 15:45	Tian J.X. 6	(10–12)	Toyoda 6	Huashi Gymnasium, Guangzhou; Referees: Al-Mutawa, Al-Suwailam (KUW)
November 16; 15:45	3× (yellow card) 4× (suspension)	Report	3× (yellow card) 2× (suspension)	Huashi Gymnasium, Guangzhou; Referees: Al-Mutawa, Al-Suwailam (KUW)

November 18; 17:30	Japan	54 – 26	India	Huashi Gymnasium, Guangzhou; Referees: Mousavian, Taghavi (IRI)
November 18; 17:30	Miyazaki 8	(26–13)	Prasad 10	Huashi Gymnasium, Guangzhou; Referees: Mousavian, Taghavi (IRI)
November 18; 17:30	3× (yellow card) 3× (suspension)	Report	2× (yellow card) 3× (suspension)	Huashi Gymnasium, Guangzhou; Referees: Mousavian, Taghavi (IRI)

November 20; 15:45	Japan	36 – 28	Saudi Arabia	Huashi Gymnasium, Guangzhou; Referees: Ossipov, Porol (KAZ)
November 20; 15:45	Kadoyama 7	(16–14)	Al-Habib 9	Huashi Gymnasium, Guangzhou; Referees: Ossipov, Porol (KAZ)
November 20; 15:45	1× (yellow card) 2× (suspension)	Report	2× (yellow card) 5× (suspension) 1× (red card)	Huashi Gymnasium, Guangzhou; Referees: Ossipov, Porol (KAZ)

Semifinals

November 23; 18:00	Japan	29 – 30	Iran	Huashi Gymnasium, Guangzhou; Referees: Al-Mutawa, Al-Suwailam (KUW)
November 23; 18:00	Toyoda 7	(16–15)	A. Esteki 6	Huashi Gymnasium, Guangzhou; Referees: Al-Mutawa, Al-Suwailam (KUW)
November 23; 18:00	3× (yellow card) 2× (suspension)	Report	3× (yellow card) 5× (suspension)	Huashi Gymnasium, Guangzhou; Referees: Al-Mutawa, Al-Suwailam (KUW)

Bronze medal match

November 26; 18:00	Japan	27 – 20	Saudi Arabia	Huashi Gymnasium, Guangzhou; Referees: Al-Mizili, Al-Mawlani (BHR)
November 26; 18:00	Toyoda 8	(13–10)	Al-Mohsin, Al-Enbaawi 4	Huashi Gymnasium, Guangzhou; Referees: Al-Mizili, Al-Mawlani (BHR)
November 26; 18:00	3× (yellow card) 2× (suspension) 2× (red card)	Report	3× (yellow card) 8× (suspension)	Huashi Gymnasium, Guangzhou; Referees: Al-Mizili, Al-Mawlani (BHR)

=== Women's tournament ===
Team

Megumi Takahashi
Aimi Ito
Akie Uegaki
Akina Shinjo
Kaori Nakamura
Shio Fujii
Kumi Mori
Karina Maki
Hiromi Tashiro
Yuko Arihama
Kaoru Yokoshima
Mayuko Ishitate
Kaori Fujima
Rika Wakamatsu
Aiko Hayafune
Sayo Shiota

Preliminary round

Group B

Pos	Team	Pld	W	D	L	GF	GA	GD	Pts	Qualification
1	China	3	3	0	0	94	49	+45	6	Semifinals
2	Japan	3	2	0	1	82	68	+14	4	Semifinals
3	North Korea	3	1	0	2	90	74	+16	2	Placement 5th–6th
4	India	3	0	0	3	42	117	−75	0	Placement 7th–8th

Source: Results

November 19; 17:15	Japan	31 – 27	North Korea	Guanggong Gymnasium, Guangzhou; Referees: Al-Mutawa, Al-Suwailam (KUW)
November 19; 17:15	Fujii 10	(14–14)	Kwak S.O. 7	Guanggong Gymnasium, Guangzhou; Referees: Al-Mutawa, Al-Suwailam (KUW)
November 19; 17:15	3× (yellow card) 3× (suspension)	Report	3× (yellow card) 3× (suspension)	Guanggong Gymnasium, Guangzhou; Referees: Al-Mutawa, Al-Suwailam (KUW)

November 20; 19:00	Japan	32 – 16	India	Guanggong Gymnasium, Guangzhou; Referees: Al-Mizili, Al-Mawlani (BHR)
November 20; 19:00	Fujii 6	(19–6)	R. Kaur, Patil 4	Guanggong Gymnasium, Guangzhou; Referees: Al-Mizili, Al-Mawlani (BHR)
November 20; 19:00	3× (yellow card) 3× (suspension)	Report	3× (yellow card) 2× (suspension)	Guanggong Gymnasium, Guangzhou; Referees: Al-Mizili, Al-Mawlani (BHR)

November 23; 20:45	Japan	19 – 25	China	Guanggong Gymnasium, Guangzhou; Referees: Al-Mizil, Al-Mawlani (BHR)
November 23; 20:45	Fujii 8	(6–12)	Li W.W. 6	Guanggong Gymnasium, Guangzhou; Referees: Al-Mizil, Al-Mawlani (BHR)
November 23; 20:45	3× (yellow card) 3× (suspension)	Report	2× (yellow card) 5× (suspension)	Guanggong Gymnasium, Guangzhou; Referees: Al-Mizil, Al-Mawlani (BHR)

Semifinals

November 25; 12:00	South Korea	28 – 29	Japan	Guanggong Gymnasium, Guangzhou; Referees: Mousavian, Taghavi (IRI)
November 25; 12:00	Ryu E.H., Moon P.H. 6	(11–15)	Fujii 9	Guanggong Gymnasium, Guangzhou; Referees: Mousavian, Taghavi (IRI)
November 25; 12:00	2× (yellow card) 1× (suspension)	Report	4× (yellow card) 2× (suspension)	Guanggong Gymnasium, Guangzhou; Referees: Mousavian, Taghavi (IRI)

Gold medal match

November 26; 14:15	Japan	22 – 31	China	Guanggong Gymnasium, Guangzhou; Referees: Al-Marzouqi, Al-Nuaimi (UAE)
November 26; 14:15	Fujii 7	(13–14)	Sha Z.W. 8	Guanggong Gymnasium, Guangzhou; Referees: Al-Marzouqi, Al-Nuaimi (UAE)
November 26; 14:15	3× (yellow card) 2× (suspension)	Report	3× (yellow card) 3× (suspension)	Guanggong Gymnasium, Guangzhou; Referees: Al-Marzouqi, Al-Nuaimi (UAE)

== Field hockey ==
=== Men's tournament ===
Team

Yoshihiro Anai
Manabu Hatakeyama
Kei Kawakami
Koji Kazukawa
Kenji Kitazato
Genki Mitani
Takayasu Mizawa
Shunsuke Nagaoka
Katsuyoshi Nagasawa
Tomonori Ono
Kazuyuki Ozawa
Hiroki Sakamoto
Naoto Shiokawa
Katsuya Takase
Kazuhiro Tsubouchi
Takahiko Yamabori

Preliminary

Group B

Team	Pld	W	D	L	GF	GA	GD	Pts
India	4	4	0	0	22	4	+18	12
Pakistan	4	3	0	1	28	6	+22	9
Japan	4	2	0	2	13	13	0	6
Bangladesh	4	1	0	3	9	21	−12	3
Hong Kong	4	0	0	4	4	32	−28	0

November 15
17:30

Japan	3 – 1	Bangladesh
Yamabori 47'; Nagasawa 56'; Ozawa 69'	Report	Kumar 9'

Aoti Hockey Field 1, Guangzhou
Umpires:
Ilanggo Kanabathu (MAS)
Chen Dekang (CHN)

November 18
19:30

Japan	2 – 8	Pakistan
Kitazato 3'; Tsubouchi 66'	Report	F. Ahmad 4'; Abbas 20', 51'; Rizwan 29'; Waqas 55'; Imran 61'; Abbasi 64'; Zubair 70'

Aoti Hockey Field 1, Guangzhou
Umpires:
Chen Dekang (CHN)
Jang Jung-Min (KOR)

November 20
13:00

Hong Kong	1 – 6	Japan
Arif Ali 46'	Report	Kitazato 18', 61', 70'; Mitani 33'; Sakamoto 44'; Yamabori 63'

Aoti Hockey Field 1, Guangzhou
Umpires:
John Hrytsak (CAN)
Jang Jung-Min (KOR)

November 21
17:30

Japan	2 – 3	India
Sakamoto 21', 63'	Report	Rajpal 31'; Sandeep 38', 62'

Aoti Hockey Field 1, Guangzhou
Umpires:
Kim Hong-Lae (KOR)
Lim Hong Zhen (SIN)

Classification 5th–8th

November 23
14:00

Japan	13 – 1	Oman
Yamabori 2', 3', 31', 42', 66', 69'; Kitazato 8', 23'; Nagasawa 18', 45'; Tsubouchi 20', 35'; Anai 62'	Report	Rajab 36'

Aoti Hockey Field 2, Guangzhou
Umpires:
Jang Jung-Min (KOR)
Lim Hong Zhen (SIN)

Classification 5th–6th

November 25
12:00

China	2 – 0	Japan
Liu Yixian 19'; Na Yubo 65'	Report

Aoti Hockey Field 2, Guangzhou
Umpires:
Simon Taylor (NZL)
Raghu Prasad (IND)

=== Women's tournament ===
Team

Sakiyo Asano
Keiko Miura
Akemi Kato
Ai Murakami
Miyuki Nakagawa
Keiko Manabe
Yukari Yamamoto
Mie Nakashima
Rika Komazawa
Kaori Chiba
Nagisa Hayashi
Mazuki Arai
Kana Nagayama
Mayumi Ono
Aki Mitsuhashi
Shiho Otsuka

Preliminary round

Team	Pld	W	D	L	GF	GA	GD	Pts
China	6	5	1	0	31	4	+27	16
South Korea	6	5	1	0	24	5	+19	16
Japan	6	4	0	2	21	7	+14	12
India	6	3	0	3	24	6	+18	9
Malaysia	6	2	0	4	12	18	−6	6
Thailand	6	1	0	5	5	44	−39	3
Kazakhstan	6	0	0	6	3	36	−33	0

November 13
15:30

Japan	5 – 0 Awarded	Kazakhstan
Murakami 10', 29'; Mitsuhashi 17'; Nakashima 21'	Report	Domashneva 65'

Aoti Hockey Field 1, Guangzhou
Umpires:
Kang Hyun-Young (KOR)
Miskarmalia Mohd Ariffin (SIN)

November 14
17:30

Japan	4 – 2	Malaysia
Chiba 3', 63'; Murakami 12'; Nakagawa 68'	Report	Hasliza 55'; F. Hashim 61'

Aoti Hockey Field 1, Guangzhou
Umpires:
Chen Hong (CHN)
Mercedes Sánchez (ARG)

November 16
13:00

Japan	3 – 0	India
Nakagawa 10'; Chiba 31'; Arai 69'	Report

Aoti Hockey Field 1, Guangzhou
Umpires:
Christiane Hippler (GER)
Miao Lin (CHN)

November 19
15:00

China	3 – 1	Japan
Zhao Yudiao 11', 26'; Gao Lihua 14'	Report	Murakami 53'

Aoti Hockey Field 1, Guangzhou
Umpires:
Christiane Hippler (GER)
Kang Hyun-Young (KOR)

November 20
14:30

Japan	8 – 0	Thailand
Mistsuhashi 20'; Otsuka 32'; Yamamoto 45', 49'; Arai 56'; Murakami 63'; Chiba 68', 69'	Report

Aoti Hockey Field 2, Guangzhou
Umpires:
Nor Piza Hassan (MAS)
Kitty Yau (HKG)

November 22
17:30

South Korea	2 – 0	Japan
Kim Jong-Eun 41', 65'	Report

Aoti Hockey Field 1, Guangzhou
Umpires:
Miao Lin (CHN)
Christiane Hippler (GER)

Bronze medal game

November 24
14:00

Japan	1 – 0 (a.e.t.)	India
Manabe 78'	Report

Aoti Hockey Field 1, Guangzhou
Umpires:
Miao Lin (CHN)
Kang Hyun-Young (KOR)

== Judo ==
=== Men ===
Athlete	Event	Preliminary	Round of 16	Quarterfinals	Final of table	Final
Athlete	Event	Opposition Result	Opposition Result	Opposition Result	Opposition Result	Opposition Result
Hiroaki Hiraoka	-60 kg	Edil Bekkulov (KGZ); W 101-000	Fadi Darwish (SYR); W 100-000	Eisa Majrashi (KSA); W Hantei	Dashdavaagiin Amartuvshin (MGL); W 100-000	Rishod Sobirov (UZB); L 000-120 (silver)
Sanju Irom	-66 kg	BYE	Palitha Phrommala (LAO); W 100-000	Hong Kuk-Hyon (PRK); W 101-000	Kim Joo-Jin (KOR); L 000-100	Bronze medal match: Dastan Ykybayev (KAZ); W 100-000 (bronze)
Hiroyuki Akimoto	-73 kg	BYE	Khalifa Al-Qubaisi (UAE); W 100-000	Azat Kubakaev (KGZ); W 120-000	Navruz Jurakobilov (UZB); W 101-000	Wang Ki-Chun (KOR); W 001-000 (gold)
Masahiro Takamatsu	-81 kg	BYE	Le Khac Nhan (VIE); W 100-000	Islam Bozbayev (KAZ); L 000-100	Final of repechage match: Mohammad Jamali (IRI); W 100-000	Bronze medal match: Otgonbaatariin Uuganbaatar (MGL); W 100-001; (silver) *
Takashi Ono	-90 kg	BYE	Muzafar Iqbal (PAK); W 100-000	Tseng Han Chieh (TPE); W 001-000	Timur Bolat (KAZ); W 100-000	Dilshod Choriev (UZB); W 100-000 (gold)
Takamasa Anai	-100 kg	BYE	Zein Tamra (LIB); W 100-000	Javad Mahjoub (IRI); W 100-000	Mukhamadmurod Abdurakhmonov (TJK); W 101-000	Hwang Hee-Tae (KOR); L 000-100 (silver)
Daiki Kamikawa	+100 kg		Zahid Iqbal (PAK); W 100-000	Iurii Krakovetskii (KGZ); W 100-000	Kim Soo-Whan (KOR); L 000-001	Bronze medal match: Shavkat Igbolov (TJK); W 100-000 (bronze)
Kazuhiko Takahashi	Open		Khaled Al-Araifi (BRN); W 100-000	Khadbaataryn Munkhbaatar (MGL); W 100-000	Ulan Ryskul (KAZ); W 100-000	Mohammad Reza Roudaki (IRI); W 100-000 (gold)

* Shokir Muminov of Uzbekistan originally won the silver medal, but was disqualified after he tested positive for Methylhexanamine. Masahiro Takamatsu and Islam Bozbayev were raised to joint second and took silver medals.

=== Women ===
Athlete	Event	Preliminary	Round of 16	Quarterfinals	Final of table	Final
Athlete	Event	Opposition Result	Opposition Result	Opposition Result	Opposition Result	Opposition Result
Tomoko Fukumi	-48 kg		Leong Siu Pou (MAC); W 101-000	Hwang Ryu-Ok (PRK); W 100-000	Baljinnyamyn Bat-Erdene (MGL); W 001-000	Wu Shugen (CHN); L Hantei (silver)
Misato Nakamura	-52 kg		BYE	Sureerat Sadmaroeng (THA); W 120-000	An Kum-Ae (PRK); W Hantei	Mönkhbaataryn Bundmaa (MGL); W 012-000 (gold)
Kaori Matsumoto	-57 kg	BYE	Ranju Rai (NEP); W 100-000	Alina Ten (KAZ); W 100-000	Rim Yun-Hui (PRK); W 001-000	Kim Jan-Di (KOR); W 001-000 (gold)
Yoshie Ueno	-63 kg		Zhanar Zhanzunova (KAZ); W 100-000	Garima Chaudhary (IND); W 100-000	Kim Su-Gyong (PRK); W Hantei	Wang Chin-fang (TPE); W 101-000 (gold)
Mina Watanabe	-70 kg		BYE	Sol Kyong (PRK); L 001-100	Final of repechage match: Nasiba Surkiyeva (TKM); W 100-010	Bronze medal match: Chen Fei (CHN); L 000-001
Akari Ogata	-78 kg			Tran Thuy Duy (VIE); W 102-000	Galiya Ulmentayeva (KAZ); W 111-000	Jeong Gyeong-Mi (KOR); L 000-100 (silver)
Mika Sugimoto	+78 kg			Thonthan Bunduang (THA); W 120-000	Kim Na-Young (KOR); W 002-001	Qin Qian (CHN); W Hantei (gold)
Megumi Tachimoto	Open		BYE	Liu Huanyuan (CHN); L 000-100	Final of repechage match: Sol Kyong (PRK); W 100-000	Bronze medal match: Thonthan Bunduang (THA); W 100-000 (bronze)

== Kabaddi ==
=== Men's tournament ===
Team

Kokei Ito
Yoji Kawai
Ryokei Kushige
Kazuaki Murakami
Ryota Nakajima
Taiki Nama
Terukazu Nitta
Masayuki Ohta
Masayuki Shimokawa
Hiromi Takahashi
Kazuhiro Takano
Yudai Yamagishi

Preliminary round

Group B

Team	Pld	W	D	L	PF	PA	PD	Pts
Pakistan	3	3	0	0	115	53	+62	6
Japan	3	2	0	1	74	58	+16	4
Bangladesh	3	1	0	2	76	89	−13	2
Malaysia	3	0	0	3	82	147	−65	0

November 22; 17:00	Bangladesh	13 – 15	Japan	Nansha Gymnasium, Guangzhou
November 22; 17:00		(5–6)		Nansha Gymnasium, Guangzhou

November 23; 11:00	Pakistan	28 – 11	Japan	Nansha Gymnasium, Guangzhou
November 23; 11:00		(16–7)		Nansha Gymnasium, Guangzhou

November 24; 17:00	Malaysia	17 – 48	Japan	Nansha Gymnasium, Guangzhou
November 24; 17:00		(7–26)		Nansha Gymnasium, Guangzhou

Semifinals

November 25; 10:00	India	52 – 17	Japan	Nansha Gymnasium, Guangzhou
November 25; 10:00		(26–5)		Nansha Gymnasium, Guangzhou

== Karate ==
=== Men ===
Athlete	Event	1/16 Finals	1/8 Finals	Quarterfinals	Semifinals	Finals
Athlete	Event	Opposition Result	Opposition Result	Opposition Result	Opposition Result	Opposition Result
Itaru Oki	Individual Kata		Noel Espinosa (PHI); W 5-0	Wong Hong Neng (MAC); W 5-0	Yousef Al-Harbi (KUW); W 4-1	Ku Jin Keat (MAS); L 2-3 (silver)
Shinji Nagaki	Kumite -67kg	Lim Yoke Wai (MAS); W 1-0	Pang Iat Long (MAC); W 7-5	Abdullah Al-Otaibi (KUW); L 1-3	Repechage 2 match: Woraphol Kueapo (THA); W 8-0	Bronze medal match: Lee Ji-Hwan (KOR); L 0-4
Ko Matsuhisa	Kumite -75kg	BYE	Mainuddin Hj Mohammad (BRU); L DSQ	did not advance		
Ryutaro Araga	Kumite -84kg	BYE	Ahmed Al-Raee (PLE); W 6-1	Yen Tzu-yao (TPE); W 2-0	Xu Xiangwu (CHN); W 2-1	Jasem Vishgahi (IRI); L 2-6 (silver)

=== Women ===
Athlete	Event	1/8 Finals	Quarterfinals	Semifinals	Finals
Athlete	Event	Opposition Result	Opposition Result	Opposition Result	Opposition Result
Rika Usami	Individual Kata	Roji Nagarkoti (NEP); W 5-0	Lim Lee Lee (MAS); W 5-0	Dewi Yulianti (INA); W 5-0	Huang Yu-chi (TPE); W 5-0 (gold)
Miki Kobayashi	Kumite -55kg	BYE	Fatemeh Chalaki (IRI); W 3-0	Marna Pabillore (PHI); W 1-0	Le Bich Phuong (VIE); L 3-4 (silver)
Yu Miyamoto	Kumite -61kg	Daria Dmitrichenko (KGZ); W 3-0	Zuhriia Mshenesh (PLE); W 8-0	Barno Mirzaeva (UZB); W 8-0	Yamini Gopalasamy (MAS); W 7-0 (gold)
Emiko Honma	Kumite -68kg	BYE	Samira Malekipour (IRI); W 2-0	Yulanda Asmuruf (INA); W 3-1	Feng Lanlan (CHN); L 0-3 (silver)

== Modern pentathlon ==
=== Men ===
Athlete	Event	Fencing			Swimming			Riding			Combined			Total Points	Final Rank
Athlete	Event	Results	Rank	MP Points	Time	Rank	MP Points	Penalties	Rank	MP Points	Time	Rank	MP Points	Total Points	Final Rank
Shinichi Tomii	Individual	20 V - 12 D	5th	932	2:01.09	2nd	1348	78.98	5th	1176	12:13.96	12th	2068	5524	6th
Hayato Noguchi	Individual	23 V - 9 D	2nd	1028	2:02.13	4th	1336	90.43	7th	1148	12:38.42	14th	1968	5480	7th
Tomoya Miguchi	Individual	15 V - 17 D	9th	804	2:01.91	3rd	1340	87.58	11th	1100	11:40.02	5th	2200	5444	8th
Shinya Fujii	Individual	13 V - 9 D	11th	748	2:03.33	8th	1320	84.89	13th	992	11:53.03	11th	2148	5208	13th
Shinichi Tomii; Hayato Noguchi; Tomoya Miguchi; Shinya Fujii	Team		2nd	3512		1st	5344		2nd	4416		3rd	8384	21656	3rd place, bronze medalist(s)

=== Women ===
Athlete	Event	Fencing			Swimming			Riding			Combined			Total Points	Final Rank
Athlete	Event	Results	Rank	MP Points	Time	Rank	MP Points	Penalties	Rank	MP Points	Time	Rank	MP Points	Total Points	Final Rank
Narumi Kurosu	Individual	15 V - 15 D	5th	832	2:19.55	5th	1128	86.11	6th	1104	14:00.62	6th	1640	4704	6th
Hitomi Seki	Individual	14 V - 16 D	9th	804	2:22.71	9th	1088	125.76	11th	888	15:34.44	11th	1264	4044	12th

== Roller sports ==
=== Women ===
Athlete	Event	Qualification		Final	
Athlete	Event	Result	Rank	Result	Rank
Nachi Shinozuka	Women's 300 m time trial			DNS	
Nachi Shinozuka	Women's 10,000 m Points + Elimination			3	5th

=== Artistic ===
Athlete	Event	Short Program		Long Program		Total	
Athlete	Event	Result	Rank	Result	Rank	Result	Rank
Shingo Nishiki	Men's Free skating	84.9	1st	253.8	1st	338.7	1st place, gold medalist(s)

== Rowing ==
Men

Athlete	Event	Heats		Repechage		Final	
Athlete	Event	Time	Rank	Time	Rank	Time	Rank
Daisaku Takeda	Lightweight Single Sculls	7:00.97	1st F	auto advancement		7:00.43	2nd place, silver medalist(s)
Kenta Tadachi; Kenta Kotani	Lightweight Double Sculls	6:39.74	2nd R	6:40.17	1st F	6:35.95	3rd place, bronze medalist(s)
Yu Kataoka; Hideki Omoto; Yoshinori Sato; Takahiro Suda	Lightweight Coxless Four	6:14.70	1st F	auto advancement		6:10.14	1st place, gold medalist(s)

Women

Athlete	Event	Heats		Repechage		Final	
Athlete	Event	Time	Rank	Time	Rank	Time	Rank
Eri Wakai	Lightweight Single Sculls	7:52.13	1st F	auto advancement		7:51.37	1st place, gold medalist(s)
Akiko Iwamoto; Atsumi Fukumoto	Lightweight Double Sculls	7:19.09	2nd R	7:14.59	1st F	7:18.13	2nd place, silver medalist(s)

== Rugby ==
=== Men's tournament ===
Team

Koji Wada
Yasunori Nagatomo
Masahiro Tsuiki
Kotaro Watanabe
Yuta Imamura
Shuetsu Narita
Hiraku Tomoigawa
Takehisa Usuzuki
Tomohiro Semba
Kenji Shomen
Takayuki Yamauchi
Tomoki Kitagawa

Preliminary round

Pool A

Team	Pld	W	D	L	PF	PA	PD	Pts
Japan	4	4	0	0	136	12	+124	12
Hong Kong	4	3	0	1	128	39	+89	10
Malaysia	4	2	0	2	68	76	−8	8
Thailand	4	1	0	3	76	86	−10	6
Mongolia	4	0	0	4	0	195	−195	4

November 21
15:21

Japan	55 – 0	Mongolia
Try: Wada (2) 2' m, 3' c Nagatomo 5' m Shomen 7' m Semba 8' c Kitagawa (3) 11' m, 14' c, 14' c Tomoigawa 13' c Con: Shomen (5/9)

University City Stadium, Guangzhou
Referee: Alan Whitcombe (Great Britain)

November 22
9:00

Japan	24 – 0	Malaysia
Try: Usuzuki 2' m Narita (2) 6' c, 8' c Kitagawa 14' m Con: Shomen (2/3)

University City Stadium, Guangzhou
Referee: Harry Mason (Singapore)

November 22
12:37

Japan	33 – 5	Thailand
Try: Shomen 2' c Tomoigawa 3' c Wada 5' m Yamauchi 9' c Nagatomo 13' c Con: Shomen (2/3); Yamauchi (1/1); Nagatomo (1/1)		Try: Yingcharoen 8' m

University City Stadium, Guangzhou
Referee: Scott Herbert (New Zealand)

November 22
16:09

Japan	24 – 7	Hong Kong
Try: Imamura (2) 2' m, 10' m Wada 7' c Tsuiki 9' c Con: Shomen (2/4)		Try: Robertson 12' c Con: Robertson (1/1)

University City Stadium, Guangzhou
Referee: Azhar Yusof (Singapore)

Quarterfinals

November 23
10:37

Japan	26 – 5	India
Try: Kitagawa 3' m Imamura (2) 10' c, 12' c Narita 14' c Con: Kitagawa (3/3)		Try: Pendse 7' m

University City Stadium, Guangzhou
Referee: Harry Mason (Singapore)

Semifinals

November 23
14:32

Japan	28 – 15	South Korea
Try: Wada (2) 2' c, 14' c Tsuiki (2) 6' c, 9' c Con: Shomen (4/4)		Try: Youn K.W. 7' m Kim W.Y. 11' m Kim H.S. 11' m

University City Stadium, Guangzhou
Referee: Scott Herbert (New Zealand)

Gold medal match

November 23
18:18

Japan	28 – 21	Hong Kong
Try: Tsuiki 4' c Wada (2) 5' c, 10' c Nagatomo 18' c Con: Shomen (4/4)		Try: Varty 9' c Robertson 12' c Yiu K.S. 15' c Con: Robertson (3/3)

University City Stadium, Guangzhou
Referee: Alan Whitcombe (Great Britain)

=== Women's tournament ===
Team

Akari Fujisaki
Chikami Inoue
Keiko Kato
Anri Kawano
Kana Mitsugi
Mami Okada
Ayaka Susuki
Misaki Susuki
Ayako Tanaka
Makiko Tomita
Marie Yamaguchi
Rinako Yokoyama

Preliminary round

Pool B

Team	Pld	W	D	L	PF	PA	PD	Pts
Kazakhstan	3	3	0	0	100	7	+93	9
Japan	3	2	0	1	62	33	+29	7
Singapore	3	1	0	2	34	53	−19	5
India	3	0	0	3	5	108	−103	3

November 21
16:35

Japan	19 – 12	Singapore
Try: Mitsugi 7' c Yamaguchi 12' c Tomita 14' m Con: Mitsugi (1/1); A. Suzuki (1/2)		Try: Chua J.L. 5' c Wang S.I. 14' m Con: Tay (1/1)

University City Stadium, Guangzhou
Referee: Anastassiya Khamova (Kazakhstan)

November 22
10:09

Japan	36 – 0	India
Try: Yamaguchi 1' m Yokoyama 7' c Fujisaki (2) 8' m, 11' c Kato 14' m Kawano 14' c Con: Yokoyama (3/6)

University City Stadium, Guangzhou
Referee: Azhar Yusof (Singapore)

November 22
13:46

Kazakhstan	21 – 7	Japan
Try: Sherer (2) 7' c, 11' c Teryayeva 10' c Con: Yakovleva (3/3)		Try: A. Suzuki 3' c Con: A. Suzuki (1/1)

University City Stadium, Guangzhou
Referee: Anthony Lothian (Hong Kong)

Quarterfinals

November 23
9:23

Japan	14 – 19	Hong Kong
Try: Tomita 2' c Kato 10' c Con: A. Suzuki (2/2)		Try: Poon P.Y. (2) 4' c, 12'm Scott 7' c Con: Lai P.F. (1/1); Poon P.Y. (1/2)

University City Stadium, Guangzhou
Referee: Azhar Yusof (Singapore)

5–8 placing

November 23
12:09

India	0 – 46	Japan
		Try: Mitsugi (3) 2' m, 6' c, 14' c Okada 4' m Yamaguchi (2) 7' m, 9' m Tanaka (2) 12' m, 14' c< Con: A. Suzuki (1/3); Yokoyama (2/5)

University City Stadium, Guangzhou
Referee: Anastassiya Khamova (Kazakhstan)

5th/6th placing

November 23
15:41

Japan	31 – 0	Singapore
Try: Yamaguchi (3) 5' m, 6' c, 7' m Inoue 10' c Tanaka 14' c Con: A. Suzuki (3/5)

University City Stadium, Guangzhou
Referee: Alan Whitcombe (Great Britain)

== Sailing ==
=== Men ===
Athlete	Event	Race												Net points	Final rank
Athlete	Event	1	2	3	4	5	6	7	8	9	10	11	12	Net points	Final rank
Makoto Tomizawa	Men's RS:X	3	1	3	4	1	4	5	5	2	5	5	(6)	38	4th
Keiju Okada	Men's Dinghy Optimist	6	3	4	3	4	6	3	5	(7)	4	2	2	41	5th
Hiroki Yamaguchi; Tetsuya Isozaki	Men's Double Handed Dinghy 420	6	4	6	6	(8)	1	1	6	3	4	4	4	45	5th
Ryunosuke Harada; Yugo Yoshida	Men's Double Handed Dinghy 470	1	1	2	(3)	1	1	1	3	1	2	2	2	17	1st place, gold medalist(s)

=== Women ===
Athlete	Event	Race												Net points	Final rank
Athlete	Event	1	2	3	4	5	6	7	8	9	10	11	12	Net points	Final rank
Eri Fukasawa	Women's Dinghy Optimist	5	5	5	6	4	(8)	7	6	4	5	4	5	56	5th
Ai Kondo; Wakako Tabata	Women's Double Handed Dinghy 470	1	1	1	1	(2)	1	1	1	1	1	1	2	12	1st place, gold medalist(s)

=== Open ===
Athlete	Event	Race												Net points	Final rank
Athlete	Event	1	2	3	4	5	6	7	8	9	10	11	12	Net points	Final rank
Hisaki Nagai	Open Laser Radial	5	5	1	1	4	2	(7)	2	6	2	3	5	36	2nd place, silver medalist(s)

Athlete	Event	Opposition	Opposition	Opposition	Opposition	Opposition	Opposition	Opposition	Total points	Rank	Semifinal	Final	Final rank
Athlete	Event	1st + 2nd Race Points	1st + 2nd Race Points	1st + 2nd Race Points	1st + 2nd Race Points	1st + 2nd Race Points	1st + 2nd Race Points	1st + 2nd Race Points	Total points	Rank	Races Points	Races Points	Final rank
Yasuhiro Okamoto; Wataru Sakamoto; Daichi Wada; Hiroaki Yoshifuji	Open Match Racing	Bahrain (BRN); 1-1	China (CHN); 1-1	Pakistan (PAK); 2-0	India (IND); 1-1	South Korea (KOR); 0-1	Singapore (SIN); 1-1	Malaysia (MAS); 2-0	8	4th	South Korea (KOR); W 3-0	India (IND); W 3-0	1st place, gold medalist(s)

== Sepaktakraw ==
=== Men's double regu ===
Team

Yuichi Matsuda
Susumu Teramoto
Takeshi Terashima

Preliminary

Group B

Pos	Team	Pld	W	L	SF	SA	SD	Pts	Qualification
1	Indonesia	3	3	0	6	0	+6	6	Semifinals
2	Japan	3	2	1	4	3	+1	4	Semifinals
3	China	3	1	2	2	5	−3	2	
4	India	3	0	3	2	6	−4	0	

Source: Results

Date		Score		Set 1	Set 2	Set 3
25 Nov	Japan	2–1	India	21–17	20–22	15–13
25 Nov	China	0–2	Japan	22–24	14–21	
26 Nov	Indonesia	2–0	Japan	21–18	21–18	

Semifinal

Date		Score		Set 1	Set 2	Set 3
26 Nov	Japan	0–2	South Korea	10–21	15–21	

=== Men's team ===
Team

Susumu Teramoto
Yuichi Matsuda
Takeshi Terashima
Yoshitaka Iida
Tomoyuki Nakatsuka
Jun Motohashi
Masahiro Yamada
Seiya Takano
Masanori Hayashi

Preliminary

Group B

Pos	Team	Pld	W	L	MF	MA	MD	Pts	Qualification
1	Malaysia	3	3	0	8	1	+7	6	Semifinals
2	Japan	3	2	1	5	4	+1	4	Semifinals
3	China	3	1	2	3	6	−3	2	
4	India	3	0	3	2	7	−5	0	

Source: Results

Date		Score		Regu 1	Regu 2	Regu 3
16 Nov	India	1–2	Japan	2–0	0–2	0–2
17 Nov	Malaysia	3–0	Japan	2–0	2–0	2–0
18 Nov	Japan	3–0	China	2–1	2–0	2–1

Semifinal

Date		Score		Regu 1	Regu 2	Regu 3
19 Nov	Thailand	1–2	Japan	2–0	2-0	

=== Women's double regu ===
Team

Sawa Aoki
Yukie Sato
Chiharu Yano

Preliminary

Group B

Pos	Team	Pld	W	L	SF	SA	SD	Pts	Qualification
1	Japan	2	2	0	4	0	+4	4	Semifinals
2	South Korea	2	1	1	2	3	−1	2	Semifinals
3	Indonesia	2	0	2	1	4	−3	0	

Source: Results

Date		Score		Set 1	Set 2	Set 3
26 Nov	Japan	2–0	South Korea	21–17	21–19	
26 Nov	Japan	2–0	Indonesia	21–17	21–18	

Semifinal

Date		Score		Set 1	Set 2	Set 3
26 Nov	Japan	0–2	China	11–21	18–21	

=== Women's team ===
Team

Sawa Aoki
Yukie Sato
Chiharu Yano
Satomi Ishihara
Yumi Ishino
Aika Kameoka
Azusa Kawai
Azusa Masuko
Yuka Watanabe Preliminary

Group A

Pos	Team	Pld	W	L	MF	MA	MD	Pts	Qualification
1	Indonesia	2	2	0	5	1	+4	4	Semifinals
2	Vietnam	2	1	1	4	2	+2	2	Semifinals
3	Japan	2	0	2	0	6	−6	0	

Source: Results

Date		Score		Regu 1	Regu 2	Regu 3
16 Nov	Indonesia	3–0	Japan	2–0	2–0	2–0
16 Nov	Vietnam	3–0	Japan	2–0	2–0	2–0

== Shooting ==
Men

Event	Athlete	Qualification		Final	
Event	Athlete	Score	Rank	Score	Rank
Men's 10 m air pistol	Tomoyuki Matsuda	577-20x	13th	Did not advance	
Men's 10 m air pistol	Kojiro Horimizu	575-19x	16th	Did not advance	
Men's 10 m air pistol	Susumu Kobayashi	572-15x	22nd	Did not advance	
Men's 10 m air pistol team	Tomoyuki Matsuda; Kojiro Horimizu; Susumu Kobayashi			1724-54x	3rd place, bronze medalist(s)
Men's 10 m air rifle	Toshikazu Yamashita	593-40x QS-Off 51.9	8th Q	693.9	8th
Men's 10 m air rifle	Midori Yajima	587-38x	19th	Did not advance	
Men's 25 m rapid fire pistol	Teruyoshi Akiyama	579-14x QS-Off 47	5th	773.5	6th
Men's 25 m center fire pistol	Kojiro Horimizu			578-14x	13th
Men's 25 m center fire pistol	Teruyoshi Akiyama			574-14x	21st
Men's 25 m center fire pistol	Susumu Kobayashi			572-16x	24th
Men's 25 m center fire pistol team	Kojiro Horimizu; Teruyoshi Akiyama; Susumu Kobayashi			1724-44x	6th
Men's 50 m pistol	Tomoyuki Matsuda	556- 4x	8th Q	653.7	3rd place, bronze medalist(s)
Men's 50 m pistol	Kojiro Horimizu	556-12x	7th Q	649.6	6th
Men's 50 m pistol	Susumu Kobayashi	555- 9x	9th	Did not advance	
Men's 50 m pistol team	Tomoyuki Matsuda; Kojiro Horimizu; Susumu Kobayashi			1667-25x	3rd place, bronze medalist(s)
Men's 50 m rifle prone	Midori Yajima	591-35x	10th	Did not advance	
Men's 50 m rifle prone	Toshikazu Yamashita	588-31x	22nd	Did not advance	
Men's 50 m rifle three positions	Midori Yajima	1165-50x	3rd Q	1259.5	5th
Men's 50 m rifle three positions	Toshikazu Yamashita	1154-50x	10th	Did not advance	

Women

Event	Athlete	Qualification		Final	
Event	Athlete	Score	Rank	Score	Rank
Women's 10 m air pistol	Kinuko Sato	379- 5x	15th	Did not advance	
Women's 10 m air pistol	Yukari Mori	372- 7x	31st	Did not advance	
Women's 10 m air pistol	Yoko Inada	372- 7x	32nd	Did not advance	
Women's 10 m air pistol team	Kinuko Sato; Yukari Mori; Yoko Inada			1123-23x	8th
Women's 10 m air rifle	Maki Konomoto	395-30x	13th	Did not advance	
Women's 10 m air rifle	Seiko Iwata	391-27x	25th	Did not advance	
Women's 10 m air rifle	Yuka Nakamura	391-22x	26th	Did not advance	
Women's 10 m air rifle team	Maki Konomoto; Seiko Iwata; Yuka Nakamura			1177-79x	6th
Women's 25 m pistol	Yukari Mori	587-25x	1st Q	784.8	2nd place, silver medalist(s)
Women's 25 m pistol	Yoko Inada	571-17x	22nd	Did not advance	
Women's 25 m pistol	Kinuko Sato	563-19x	30th	Did not advance	
Women's 25 m pistol team	Yukari Mori; Yoko Inada; Kinuko Sato			1721-61x	4th
Women's 50 m rifle prone	Seiko Iwata			592-38x	3rd place, bronze medalist(s)
Women's 50 m rifle prone	Yuka Nakamura			584-28x	19th
Women's 50 m rifle prone	Maki Konomoto			576-22x	40th
Women's 50 m rifle prone team	Seiko Iwata; Yuka Nakamura; Maki Konomoto			1752-88x	6th
Women's 50 m rifle three positions	Maki Konomoto	578-24x	4th Q	678.0	4th
Women's 50 m rifle three positions	Seiko Iwata	570-23x	19th	Did not advance	
Women's 50 m rifle three positions	Yuka Nakamura	563-22x	28th	Did not advance	
Women's 50 m rifle three positions team	Seiko Iwata; Yuka Nakamura; Maki Konomoto			1711-81x	5th
Women's Trap	Yukie Nakayama	71	1st Q	89	1st place, gold medalist(s)
Women's Trap	Keiko Suzu	58	19th	Did not advance	

== Soft Tennis ==
Athlete	Event	Round Group			1st Round	Quarterfinals	Semifinals	Final
Athlete	Event	Match 1	Match 2	Match 3	1st Round	Quarterfinals	Semifinals	Final
Athlete	Event	Opposition Result	Opposition Result	Opposition Result	Opposition Result	Opposition Result	Opposition Result	Opposition Result
Hidenori Shinohara	Men's Singles	Donedy Keodalasouk (LAO); W 4-0 (4-0, 8-6, 4-1, 4-0)	Chen Mingdong (CHN); L 1-4 (1-4, 4-1, 2-4, 3-5, 3-5)		Lee Yo-Han (KOR); L 1-4 (5-3, 0-4, 1-4, 2-4, 6-8)	Did not advance		
Keiya Nakamoto	Men's Singles	Joseph Arcilla (PHI); W 4-2 (4-1, 4-1, 6-4, 4-6, 3-5, 4-0)	Uchirsaikhan Bayasgalant (MGL); W 4-0 (4-2, 5-3, 4-2, 4-2)	Bae Hwan-Sung (KOR); W 4-3 (4-6, 4-2, 1-4, 4-1, 4-1, 2-4, 8-6)	BYE	Radnaabazaryn Bayartogtokh (MGL); W 4-0 (4-0, 4-2, 4-1, 5-3)	Lee Yo-Han (KOR); L 3-4 (5-3, 4-2, 2-4, 4-2, 1-4, 5-7, 2-7) (bronze)	Did not advance
Koji Kobayashi; Hidenori Shinohara	Men's Doubles	Ananda Khamphoumy (LAO) and Anandone Khamphoumy (LAO); W 5-0 (4-0, 4-0, 4-0, 4-0, 4-1)	Jiao Yang (CHN) and Shi Bo (CHN); W 5-2 (4-1, 4-2, 5-3, 5-7, 4-1, 1-4, 5-3)		Chai Jin (CHN) and Li Xiang (CHN); W 5-0 (4-1, 4-0, 4-0, 4-1, 4-1)	Ji Yong-Min (KOR) and Lee Yeon (KOR); W 5-3 (4-2, 5-3, 2-4, 4-2, 5-7, 4-1, 3-5, 4-2)	Li Chia-hung (TPE) and Yang Sheng-fa (TPE); L 3-5 (6-4, 3-5, 4-2, 4-2, 1-4, 3-5, 3-5, 3-5) (bronze)	Did not advance
Shigeo Nakahori; Tsuneo Takagawa	Men's Doubles	Donedy Keodalasouk (LAO) and Bounthavong Sirisak (LAO); W 5-1 (4-1, 4-1, 4-2, 4-1, 2-4, 4-2)	Chai Jin (CHN) and Li Xiang (CHN); W 5-1 (4-2, 4-0, 5-7, 4-1, 4-2, 4-0)		BYE	Jiao Yang (CHN) and Shi Bo (CHN); W 5-2 (2-4, 6-4, 4-0, 5-3, 2-4, 4-2, 4-2)	Bae Hwan-Sung (KOR) and Kim Tae-Jung (KOR); L 0-5 (3-5, 1-4, 2-4, 3-5, 1-4) (bronze)	Did not advance
Shigeo Nakahori; Tsuneo Takagawa; Keiya Nakamoto; Koji Kobayashi; Hidenori Shinohara	Men's Team	Laos (LAO); W 3-0 (5-1, 4-0, 5-0)	China (CHN); W 2-1 (5-2, 3-4, 5-0)	Mongolia (MGL); W 3-0 (5-4, 4-1, 5-2)			South Korea (KOR); W 2-1 (5-3, 3-4, 5-4)	Chinese Taipei (TPE); L 1-2 (5-2, 3-4, 4-5) (silver)
Ayaka Oba	Women's Singles	Taruka Srivastav (IND); W 4-0 (4-0, 4-2, 4-1, 4-2)	Dash Tsetsenbayar (MGL); W 4-0 (4-1, 4-1, 4-1, 4-1)	Gao Tong (CHN); W 4-0 (4-2, 5-3, 4-2, 4-2)	BYE	Kim Ae-Kyung (KOR); L 1-4 (4-0, 1-4, 2-4, 3-5, 1-4)	Did not advance	
Eri Uehara	Women's Singles	Ri Nam-Hui (PRK); W 4-2 (4-6, 4-2, 6-4, 2-4, 4-2, 7-5)	Kim Kyung-Ryun (KOR); L 1-4 (5-7, 1-4, 4-6, 4-1, 1-4)		Chang Wen-hsin (TPE); W 4-1 (4-2, 5-3, 1-4, 4-0, 8-6)	Chiang Wan-chi (TPE); L 2-4 (4-1, 2-4, 2-4, 5-3, 2-4, 3-5)	Did not advance	
Ayaka Oba; Mai Sasaki	Women's Doubles	Priyanka Bugade (IND) and Samia Rizvi (IND); W 5-0 (4-1, 4-0, 4-0, 4-1, 4-0)	Xin Yani (CHN) and Zhao Lei (CHN); L 1-5 (1-4, 0-4, 3-5, 2-4, 4-2, 1-4)	Bulgan Norovsuren (MGL) and Dagiidamba Naranjargal (MGL); W 5-0 (4-0, 5-3, 4-0, 4-1, 4-1)		Cheng Chu-ling (TPE) and Chu Yun-hsuan (TPE); W 5-4 (2-4, 4-1, 1-4, 2-4, 2-4, 4-1, 4-2, 4-0, 7-4)	Joo Og (KOR) and Kim Ae-Kyung (KOR); L 1-5 (6-8, 6-4, 2-4, 2-4, 2-4, 7-9) (bronze)	Did not advance
Hitomi Sugimoto; Eri Uehara	Women's Doubles	Jo Yong-Sim (PRK) and Ri Nam-Hui (PRK); W 5-2 (5-3, 4-1, 3-5, 7-5, 4-1, 0-4, 8-6)	Deena Cruz (PHI) and Samia Rizvi (PHI); W 5-0 (4-0, 4-1, 4-2, 4-2, 4-2)	Cheng Chu-ling (TPE) and Chu Yun-hsuan (TPE); L 4-5 (2-4, 4-1, 3-5, 4-1, 5-3, 2-4, 1-4, 4-1, 9-11)		Kwon Ran-Hee (KOR) and Park Soon-Joung (KOR); W 5-0 (5-3, 6-4, 4-0, 4-1, 4-1)	Xin Yani (CHN) and Zhao Lei (CHN); W 5-2 (5-3, 3-5, 3-5, 6-4, 4-1, 4-0, 6-4)	Joo Og (KOR) and Kim Ae-Kyung (KOR); W 5-3 (4-2, 1-4, 1-4, 1-4, 4-2, 4-1, 4-1, 4-2) (gold)
Kana Morihara; Hitomi Sugimoto; Eri Uehara; Ayaka Oba; Mai Sasaki	Women's Team	Philippines (PHI); W 3-0 (5-1, 4-1, 5-0)	North Korea (PRK); W 3-0 (5-0, 4-1, 5-1)	Chinese Taipei (TPE); W 2-1 (5-3, 1-4, 5-1)			China (CHN); W 2-1 (5-2, 1-4, 5-3)	Chinese Taipei (TPE); W 2-1 (5-2, 0-4, 5-2) (gold)
Hidenori Shinohara; Mai Sasaki	Mixed Doubles				Jitender Singh Mehlda (IND) and Monica Menon (IND); W 5-0 (5-3, 4-0, 5-3, 4-1, 4-1)	Li Chia-hung (TPE) and Cheng Chu-ling (TPE); L 4-5 (2-4, 4-1, 4-1, 4-6, 2-4, 0-4, 4-2, 4-2, 0-7)	Did not advance	
Keiya Nakamoto; Hitomi Sugimoto	Mixed Doubles				Jhomar Arcilla (PHI) and Josephine Paguyo (PHI); W 5-0 (4-1, 5-3, 4-1, 4-2, 4-0)	Liu Chia-lun (TPE) and Hang Chia-ling (TPE); L 3-5 (0-4, 2-4, 4-2, 4-2, 4-1, 3-5, 2-4, 2-4)	Did not advance	

== Softball ==
=== Women ===
Team

Yukiyo Mine
Rei Nishiyama
Ayumi Karino
Haruna Sakamoto
Shizuyo Hamamoto
Misato Kawano
Emi Matsuoka
Eri Yamada
Sayuri Yamane
Mika Someya
Naoko Matsumoto
Yukiko Ueno
Makiko Fujiwara
Satoko Mabuchi
Maki Tanigawa

Preliminaries

Team	Pld	W	L	RF	RA
Chinese Taipei	5	5	0	26	7
Japan	5	4	1	35	3
China	5	3	2	24	9
South Korea	5	2	3	13	14
Philippines	5	1	4	7	24
Thailand	5	0	5	2	40

November 19 13:00 at Tianhe Softball Field, Guangzhou
Team	1	2	3	4	5	6	7	R	H	E
Thailand	0	0	0	X	X	X	X	0	0	6
Japan	9	4	2	X	X	X	X	15	12	0
WP: Makiko Fujiwara LP: Parima Phandakari

November 20 18:00 at Tianhe Softball Field, Guangzhou
Team	1	2	3	4	5	6	7	R	H	E
South Korea	0	0	0	0	0	0	0	0	1	0
Japan	0	0	0	1	0	2	X	3	7	0
WP: Mika Someya LP: Lim Mi-Ran; Home runs: KOR: None; JPN: Ayumi Karino (1)

November 21 15:30 at Tianhe Softball Field, Guangzhou
Team	1	2	3	4	5	6	7	R	H	E
Japan	0	0	0	0	0	0	1	1	6	0
Chinese Taipei	2	0	0	0	0	0	X	2	3	1
WP: Chung Hui-lin LP: Yukiko Ueno; Home runs: JPN: None; TPE: Chiang Hui-chuan (1)

November 22 13:00 at Tianhe Softball Field, Guangzhou
Team	1	2	3	4	5	6	7	R	H	E
Philippines	0	0	0	0	0	0	0	0	1	1
Japan	2	0	1	1	0	0	X	4	11	0
WP: Sayuri Yamane LP: Corazon Sobere

November 23 15:30 at Tianhe Softball Field, Guangzhou
Team	1	2	3	4	5	6	7	R	H	E
Japan	1	0	0	1	0	0	0	2	6	2
China	1	0	0	0	0	0	0	1	3	2
WP: Yukiko Ueno LP: Li Qi

Semifinals

November 25 16:00 at Tianhe Softball Field, Guangzhou
Team	1	2	3	4	5	6	7	R	H	E
Japan	0	0	0	0	5	0	0	5	9	0
Chinese Taipei	0	0	0	1	0	0	1	2	4	1
WP: Yukiko Ueno LP: Chueh Ming-hui; Home runs: JPN: None; TPE: Chiang Hui-chuan (1)

Grand final

November 26 18:30 at Tianhe Softball Field, Guangzhou
Team	1	2	3	4	5	6	7	R	H	E
Japan	0	0	0	1	0	1	0	2	7	1
China	0	0	0	0	0	0	0	0	1	0
WP: Yukiko Ueno LP: Wang Lan

== Squash ==
Athlete	Event	1st Round	2nd Round	Quarterfinals	Semifinals	Final
Athlete	Event	Opposition Result	Opposition Result	Opposition Result	Opposition Result	Opposition Result
Shinnosuke Tsuke	Men's singles	Gihan Suwaris (SRI); W 3-0 (11-5, 11-3, 11-9)	Farhan Mehboob (PAK); L 0-3 (7-11, 5-11, 4-11)	Did not advance		
Yuta Fukui	Men's singles	Mohammed Al-Saif (KSA); W 3-0 (11-3, 11-1, 11-2)	Ong Beng Hee (MAS); L 0-3 (2-11, 7-11, 5-11)	Did not advance		
Chinatsu Matsui	Women's singles		Low Wee Wern (MAS); L 0-3 (10-12, 4-11, 8-11)	Did not advance		
Misaki Kobayashi	Women's singles		Yvonne Dalida (PHI); W 3-0 (11-6, 11-4, 11-4)	Annie Au (HKG); L 1-3 (3-11, 8-11, 12-10, 6-11)	Did not advance	

Athlete	Event	Pool Summary					Semifinals	Final
Athlete	Event	Contest 1	Contest 2	Contest 3	Contest 4	Contest 5	Semifinals	Final
Athlete	Event	Opposition Result	Opposition Result	Opposition Result	Opposition Result	Opposition Result	Opposition Result	Opposition Result
Yuta Fukui; Takanori Shimizu; Shinnosuke Tsuke	Men's Team	South Korea (KOR); W 2-1 (3-0, 3-0, 0-3)	India (IND); L 0-3 (0-3, 0-3, 0-3)	Qatar (QAT); W 3-0 (3-0, 3-0, 3-2)	Malaysia (MAS); L 0-3 (0-3, 0-3, 0-3)	Saudi Arabia (KSA); W 3-0 (3-0, 3-0, 3-0)	Did not advance	
Misaki Kobayashi; Chinatsu Matsui; Miwa Maekawa	Women's Team	South Korea (KOR); L 1-2 (3-0, 2-3, 2-3)	Malaysia (MAS); L 0-3 (0-3, 1-3, 0-3)				Did not advance	

== Swimming ==
Men

Event	Athletes	Heat		Final	
Event	Athletes	Time	Rank	Time	Rank
50 m freestyle	Rammaru Harada	22.71	2nd Q	22.84	3rd place, bronze medalist(s)
50 m freestyle	Masayuki Kishida	22.86	3rd Q	22.45	2nd place, silver medalist(s)
100 m freestyle	Takuro Fujii	50.27	3rd Q	49.37	3rd place, bronze medalist(s)
100 m freestyle	Sho Uchida	51.50	5th Q	50.07	5th
200 m freestyle	Yuki Kobori	1:49.61	4th Q	1:48.15	5th
200 m freestyle	Takeshi Matsuda	1:50.20	5th Q	1:47.73	3rd place, bronze medalist(s)
400 m freestyle	Takeshi Matsuda	3:55.02	3rd Q	3:51.65	4th
400 m freestyle	Sho Uchida	3:55.70	4th Q	3:53.42	5th
1500 m freestyle	Sho Uchida			15:52.29	5th
50 m backstroke	Junya Koga	25.42	1st Q	25.08	1st place, gold medalist(s)
50 m backstroke	Ryosuke Irie	25.67	2nd Q	25.16	2nd place, silver medalist(s)
100 m backstroke	Junya Koga	54.45	1st Q	53.88	2nd place, silver medalist(s)
100 m backstroke	Ryosuke Irie	55.57	2nd Q	53.61	1st place, gold medalist(s)
200 m backstroke	Ryosuke Irie	1:59.78	1st Q	1:55.45	1st place, gold medalist(s)
50 m breaststroke	Ryo Tateishi	28.20	3rd Q	27.86	2nd place, silver medalist(s)
50 m breaststroke	Kosuke Kitajima	28.38	5th Q	28.15	5th
100 m breaststroke	Ryo Tateishi	1:02.27	2nd Q	1:00.38	1st place, gold medalist(s)
100 m breaststroke	Kosuke Kitajima	1:02.35	3rd Q	1:01.85	4th
200 m breaststroke	Naoya Tomita	2:16.06	5th Q	2:10.36	1st place, gold medalist(s)
50 m butterfly	Masayuki Kishida	24.49	4th Q	24.13	2nd place, silver medalist(s)
50 m butterfly	Rammaru Harada	24.51	6th Q	24.51	6th
100 m butterfly	Takuro Fujii	52.85	1st Q	51.85	2nd place, silver medalist(s)
100 m butterfly	Masayuki Kishida	53.83	4th Q	52.93	4th
200 m butterfly	Takeshi Matsuda	1:58.27	2nd Q	1:54.02	1st place, gold medalist(s)
200 m butterfly	Ryusuke Sakata	1:58.47	4th Q	1:55.23	2nd place, silver medalist(s)
200 m individual medley	Ken Takakuwa	2:01.80	1st Q	1:58.31	1st place, gold medalist(s)
200 m individual medley	Yuya Horihata	2:04.71	4th Q	2:00.48	3rd place, bronze medalist(s)
400 m individual medley	Ken Takakuwa	4:24.02	4th Q	4:16.42	3rd place, bronze medalist(s)
400 m individual medley	Yuya Horihata	4:22.18	2nd Q	4:13.35	1st place, gold medalist(s)
4×100 m freestyle	Takuro Fujii; Rammaru Harada; Shunsuke Kuzuhara; Sho Uchida; Yuki Kobori*; Yoshihiro Okumura*	3:19.11	2nd Q	3:16.78	2nd place, silver medalist(s)
4×200 m freestyle	Yuki Kobori; Sho Uchida; Shunsuke Kuzuhara; Takeshi Matsuda; Yoshihiro Okumura*	7:15.57	1st Q	7:10.39	2nd place, silver medalist(s)
4×100 m medley	Ryosuke Irie; Takuro Fujii; Ryo Tateishi; Rammaru Harada; Kosuke Kitajima*; Shunsuke Kuzuhara*; Masayuki Kishida*	3:40.78	1st Q	3:34.10	1st place, gold medalist(s)

* Participated in the heats only.

Women

Event	Athletes	Heat		Final	
Event	Athletes	Time	Rank	Time	Rank
50 m freestyle	Yayoi Matsumoto	25.75	3rd Q	25.67	3rd place, bronze medalist(s)
50 m freestyle	Tomoko Hagiwara	25.86	5th Q	26.04	5th
100 m freestyle	Haruka Ueda	55.47	2nd Q	55.15	3rd place, bronze medalist(s)
100 m freestyle	Yayoi Matsumoto	56.33	5th Q	55.78	5th
200 m freestyle	Haruka Ueda	2:00.03	2nd Q	1:59.42	4th
200 m freestyle	Hanae Ito	2:00.72	3rd Q	1:58.24	3rd place, bronze medalist(s)
400 m freestyle	Maiko Fujino	4:19.44	4th Q	4:15.17	4th
800 m freestyle	Maiko Fujino			8:33.55	3rd place, bronze medalist(s)
50 m backstroke	Aya Terakawa	28.47	3rd Q	27.86	2nd place, silver medalist(s)
50 m backstroke	Shiho Sakai	28.62	4th Q	28.17	4th
100 m backstroke	Aya Terakawa	1:01.58	2nd Q	59.92	4th
100 m backstroke	Shiho Sakai	1:00.42	1st Q	59.87	2nd place, silver medalist(s)
200 m backstroke	Aya Terakawa	2:14.28	4th Q	2:09.72	3rd place, bronze medalist(s)
200 m backstroke	Shiho Sakai	2:09.68	1st Q	2:07.81	2nd place, silver medalist(s)
50 m breaststroke	Satomi Suzuki	32.12	3rd Q	31.52	3rd place, bronze medalist(s)
50 m breaststroke	Rie Kaneto	33.11	8th Q	32.85	7th
100 m breaststroke	Satomi Suzuki	1:09.23	1st Q	1:07.43	2nd place, silver medalist(s)
100 m breaststroke	Rie Kaneto	1:10.51	5th Q	1:09.66	5th
200 m breaststroke	Satomi Suzuki	2:30.45	4th Q	2:25.68	5th
200 m breaststroke	Rie Kaneto	2:28.36	2nd Q	2:25.63	4th
50 m butterfly	Yuka Kato	26.59	3rd Q	26.27 NR	2nd place, silver medalist(s)
50 m butterfly	Natsumi Hoshi	27.84	8th Q	27.93	8th
100 m butterfly	Yuka Kato	58.61	1st Q	58.46	3rd place, bronze medalist(s)
100 m butterfly	Natsumi Hoshi	59.90	7th Q	59.87	6th
200 m butterfly	Yuka Kato	2:13.79	6th Q	2:09.82	4th
200 m butterfly	Natsumi Hoshi	2:09.94	2nd Q	2:07.96	2nd place, silver medalist(s)
200 m individual medley	Izumi Kato	2:17.66	5th Q	2:14.64	4th
200 m individual medley	Maiko Fujino	2:18.84	7th Q	2:16.22	6th
400 m individual medley	Izumi Kato	4:44.72	2nd Q	4:46.02	5th
400 m individual medley	Maiko Fujino	4:45.67	4th Q	4:42.31	5th
4×100 m freestyle	Haruka Ueda; Yayoi Matsumoto; Tomoko Hagiwara; Hanae Ito			3:37.90	2nd place, silver medalist(s)
4×200 m freestyle	Hanae Ito; Haruka Ueda; Yayoi Matsumoto; Risa Sekine			7:55.92	2nd place, silver medalist(s)
4×100 m medley	Aya Terakawa; Satomi Susuki; Yuka Kato}Haruka Ueda			3:58.24	2nd place, silver medalist(s)

== Synchronized swimming ==
Athlete	Event	Technical Routine		Free Routine		Total	
Athlete	Event	Points	Rank	Points	Rank	Points	Rank
Yukiko Inui; Chisa Kobayashi	Women's Duet	93.375	2nd	93.500	2nd	186.875	2nd place, silver medalist(s)
Yumi Adachi, Miho Arai, Aika Hakoyama, Yukiko Inui, Mayo Itoyama, Chisa Kobayashi, Mai Nakamura, Misa Sugiyama, Yui Ueminami, Kurumi Yoshida	Women's Team	92.750	2nd	93.375	2nd	186.125	2nd place, silver medalist(s)
Yumi Adachi, Miho Arai, Aika Hakoyama, Yukiko Inui, Mayo Itoyama, Chisa Kobayashi, Mai Nakamura, Misa Sugiyama, Yui Ueminami, Kurumi Yoshida	Women's Combination					94.000	2nd place, silver medalist(s)

== Table Tennis ==
Athlete	Event	Round of 64	Round of 32	Round of 16	Quarterfinals	Semifinals	Final
Athlete	Event	Opposition Result	Opposition Result	Opposition Result	Opposition Result	Opposition Result	Opposition Result
Jun Mizutani	Men's singles	BYE	Lkhagvadorjyn Altantulga (MGL); W 4-0 (11-2, 11-6, 11-1, 11-8)	Li Ching (HKG); W 4-2 (11-7, 11-5, 7-11, 11-4, 6-11, 11-8)	Gao Ning (SIN); W 4-2 (8-11, 11-2, 8-11, 11-8, 15-13, 12-10)	Wang Hao (CHN); L 0-4 (10-12, 4-11, 4-11, 5-11) (bronze)	Did not advance
Kenta Matsudaira	Men's singles	BYE	Chang Hoi Wa (MAC); W 4-0 (11-7, 11-4, 11-5, 11-4)	Ma Long (CHN); L 2-4 (9-11, 11-8, 11-8, 8-11, 9-11, 4-11)	Did not advance		
Seiya Kishikawa; Jun Mizutani	Men's Doubles		Chuang Chih-yuan (TPE) and Wu Chih-chi (TPE); L 2-3 (11-9, 11-8, 10-12, 6-11, 10-12)	Did not advance			
Kenta Matsudaira; Koki Niwa	Men's Doubles		Kim Chol-jin (PRK) and Kim Hyok-Bong (PRK); W 3-1 (11-13, 11-9, 11-3, 11-7)	Jiang Tianyi (HKG) and Tang Peng (HKG); W 3-0 (12-10, 11-6, 11-8)	Lee Jung-Woo (KOR) and Oh Sang-Eun (KOR); W 3-2 (3-11, 11-7, 11-5, 16-18, 11-7)	Ma Lin (CHN) and Xu Xin (CHN); L 1-4 (6-11, 11-8, 6-11, 6-11, 5-11) (bronze)	Did not advance
Sayaka Hirano	Women's singles	BYE	Shamini Kumaresan (IND); W 4-2 (11-7, 11-5, 7-11, 11-7, 7-11, 11-7)	Tie Ya Na (HKG); W 4-0 (11-8, 11-5, 11-6, 12-10)	Kim Kyung-Ah (KOR); L 0-4 (9-11, 6-11, 9-11, 5-11)	Did not advance	
Ai Fukuhara	Women's singles	BYE	Olga Kim (UZB); W 4-0 (11-6, 11-4, 11-2, 11-5)	Huang Yi-hua (TPE); W 4-0 (11-8, 11-8, 11-8, 11-5)	Wang Yuegu (SIN); W 4-2 (7-11, 11-8, 11-3, 9-11, 12-10, 13-11)	Guo Yue (CHN); L 3-4 (11-5, 12-10, 8-11, 11-9, 9-11, 8-11, 8-11) (bronze)	Did not advance
Ai Fukuhara; Kasumi Ishikawa	Women's Doubles		Luong Thi Tam (VIE) and Pham Thi Thien Kim (VIE); W 3-0 (11-3, 11-7, 11-3)	Suthasini Sawettabut (THA) and Tidaporn Vongboon (THA); W 3-1 (11-2, 8-11, 11-6, 11-6)	Kim Kyung-Ah (KOR) and Park Mi-Young (KOR); W 3-1 (11-7, 4-11, 11-7, 14-12)	Ding Ning (CHN) and Liu Shiwen (CHN); L 0-4 (8-11, 8-11, 5-11, 7-11) (bronze)	Did not advance
Hiroko Fujii; Misako Wakamiya	Women's Doubles		Jiang Huajun (HKG) and Tie Ya Na (HKG); W 3-2 (4-11, 11-9, 11-9, 6-11, 13-11)	Nanthana Komwong (THA) and Anisara Muangsuk (THA); W 3-0 (11-0, 11-5, 11-5)	Feng Tianwei (SIN) and Wang Yuegu (SIN); W 3-0 (12-10, 11-6, 11-8)	Guo Yue (CHN) and Li Xiaoxia (CHN); L 1-4 (3-11, 1-11, 13-11, 2-11, 7-11) (bronze)	Did not advance
Seiya Iishikawa; Ai Fukuhara	Mixed Doubles		Kim Hyok-Bong (PRK) and Kim Jong (PRK); W 3-2 (11-5, 5-11, 11-8, 4-11, 11-3)	Sharath Kamal (IND) and Shamini Kumaresan (IND); W 3-2 (10-12, 11-4, 8-11, 11-2, 11-6)	Wu Chih-chi (TPE) and Cheng I-ching (TPE); W 3-0 (11-6, 11-7, 11-6)	Cheung Yuk (HKG) and Jiang Huajun (HKG); L 3-4 (6-11, 5-11, 11-5, 3-11, 11-2, 14-12, 9-11) (bronze)	Did not advance
Kenta Matsudaira; Kasumi Ishikawa	Mixed Doubles		Joo Se-Hyuk (KOR) and Kim Kyung-Ah (KOR); W 3-0 (11-6, 12-10, 11-9)	Leong Kin Wa (MAC) and Cheong Cheng I (MAC); W 3-0 (11-4, 11-2, 11-4)	Ri Chol-Guk (PRK) and Kim Hye-Song (PRK); W 3-0 (11-4, 11-6, 11-7)	Xu Xin (CHN) and Guo Yan (CHN); L 0-4 (8-11, 5-11, 8-11,6-11) (bronze)	Did not advance

Athlete	Event	Pool Summary			Quarterfinals	Semifinals	Final
Athlete	Event	Contest 1	Contest 2	Contest 3	Quarterfinals	Semifinals	Final
Athlete	Event	Opposition Result	Opposition Result	Opposition Result	Opposition Result	Opposition Result	
Kaii Yoshida; Seiya Kishikawa; Jun Mizutani; Kenta Matsudaira; Koki Niwa	Men's Team	Nepal (NEP); W 3-0 (3-0, 3-0, 3-0)	Hong Kong (HKG); W 3-2 (1-3, 3-0, 1-3, 3-2, 3-2)	Iran (IRI); W 3-0 (3-0, 3-2, 3-2)	India (IND); W 3-1 (0-3, 3-0, 3-1, 3-1)	China (CHN); L 0-3 (1-3, 0-3, 1-3) (bronze)	Did not advance
Sayaka Hirano; Ai Fukuhara; Kasumi Ishikawa; Hiroko Fujii; Misako Wakamiya	Men's Team	Tajikistan (TJK); W 3-0 (3-0, 3-0, 3-0)	China (CHN); L 0-3 (0-3, 0-3, 0-3)	Chinese Taipei (TPE); W 3-1 (3-1, 1-3, 3-1, 3-2)	Singapore (SIN); L 2-3 (3-1, 0-3, 3-2, 1-3, 2-3)	Did not advance	

== Taekwondo ==
=== Men ===
Athlete	Event	Round of 32	Round of 16	Quarterfinals	Semifinals	Final
Athlete	Event	Opposition Result	Opposition Result	Opposition Result	Opposition Result	Opposition Result
Takaya Nakagawa	Finweight (-54kg)	Chutchawal Khawlao (THA); L PTS 3-5	Did not advance			
Yuki Mitsuhash	Bantamweight (-63kg)	BYE	Khalid Al-Zaid (KUW); W PTS 7-5	Nacha Punthong (THA); L PTS 4-5	Did not advance	
Yoshihiro Nagano	Welterweight (-80kg)	Nabil Talal (JOR); L PTS 0-14	Did not advance			

=== Women ===
Athlete	Event	Round of 32	Round of 16	Quarterfinals	Semifinals	Final
Athlete	Event	Opposition Result	Opposition Result	Opposition Result	Opposition Result	Opposition Result
Erika Kasahara	Flyweight (-49kg)		BYE	Luisa dos Santos (TLS); W RSC Round2 2:00	Vu Thi Hau (VIE); W PTS 5-0	Wu Jingyu (CHN); L PTS 1-13 (silver)

== Tennis ==
Athlete	Event	Round of 64	Round of 32	Round of 16	Quarterfinals	Semifinals	Final
Athlete	Event	Opposition Result	Opposition Result	Opposition Result	Opposition Result	Opposition Result	Opposition Result
Go Soeda	Men's singles	BYE	Aqeel Khan (PAK); W 6-2, 6-4	Cecil Mamiit (PHI); W 4-6, 6-4, 6-3	Wu Di (CHN); W 6-2, 6-3	Denis Istomin (UZB); L 1-6, 0-6 (bronze)	Did not advance
Tatsuma Ito	Men's singles	BYE	Thangarajah Dineshkanthan (SRI); W 6-2, 6-2	Treat Conrad Huey (PHI); W 6-4, 6-4	Danai Udomchoke (THA); W 6-4, 6-1	Somdev Devvarman (IND); L 2-6, 6-0, 3-6 (bronze)	Did not advance
Hiroki Kondo; Go Soeda	Men's doubles		BYE	Treat Conrad Huey (PHI) and Cecil Mamiit (PHI); L 6-4, 6(0)-7, [6-10]	Did not advance		
Toshihide Matsui; Takao Suzuki	Men's doubles		Jae Cho-soong (KOR) and Kim Hyun Joon (KOR); L 3-6, 6-3, [7-10]	Did not advance			
Tatsuma Ito; Toshihide Matsui; Takao Suzuki; Go Soeda	Men's team		BYE	Hong Kong (HKG); W 3-0 (2-1, 2-0, 2-0)	China (CHN); W 2-1 (0-2, 2-0, 2-1)	Uzbekistan (UZB); L 1-2 (2-0, 1-2, 0-2) (bronze)	Did not advance
Kimiko Date-Krumm	Women's singles		BYE	Zhang Ling (HKG); W 6-3, 6-3	Lee Jin-a (KOR); W 7-6(2), 7-5	Peng Shuai (CHN); L 6(7)-7, 6-3, 6-4 (bronze)	Did not advance
Ayumi Morita	Women's singles		Ksenia Palkina (KGZ); W 6-1, 6-1	Hsu Wen-hsin (TPE); W 6-1, 6-2	Akgul Amanmuradova (UZB); L 2-6, 6-2, 2-6	Did not advance	
Kimiko Date-Krumm; Ayumi Morita	Women's doubles		BYE	Nudnida Luangnam (THA) and Nicha Lertpitaksinchai (THA); W 6-0, 5-7, [10-8]	Kim So-jung (KOR) and Lee Jin-a (KOR); L 6-3, 6(7)-7, [9-11]	Did not advance	
Misaki Doi; Ryoko Fuda	Women's doubles		Rushmi Chakravarthi (IND) and Poojashree Venkatesha (IND); W 6-3, 6-1	Chang Kai-chen (TPE) and Hsieh Su-wei (TPE); L 7-6(6), 4-6, [7-10]	Did not advance		
Misaki Doi; Ryoko Fuda; Kimiko Date-Krumm; Ayumi Morita	Women's team			BYE	Nepal (NEP); W 3-0 (2-0, 2-0, 2-0)	Chinese Taipei (TPE); L 1-2 (1-2, 1-0, 0-2) (bronze)	Did not advance
Yurika Sema; Hiroki Kondo	Mixed doubles		BYE	Rushmi Chakravarthi (IND) and Sanam Krishan Singh (IND); W 6-4, 3-6, [10-3]	Noppawan Lertcheewakarn (THA) and Sonchat Ratiwatana (THA); W 6-4, 6-4	Chan Yung-jan (KOR) and Yang Tsung-hua (KOR); L 3-6, 3-6 (bronze)	Did not advance
Misaki Doi; Takao Suzuki	Mixed doubles		BYE	Zhang Ling (CHN) and Martin Sayer (CHN); W 6-4, 6-4	Tamarine Tanasugarn (THA) and Sanchai Ratiwatana (THA); W 4-6, 4-6	Did not advance	

== Triathlon ==
Athlete	Event	Swim (1.5 km)	Trans 1	Bike (40 km)	Trans 2	Run (10 km)	Total	Rank
Yuichi Hosoda	Men's Individual	19:04; 4th	1:05; 4th	1:00:04; 6th	0:36; 2nd	31:25; 1st	1:52:15.56	1st place, gold medalist(s)
Ryosuke Yamamoto	Men's Individual	19:02; 2nd	1:06; 8th	1:00:05; 7th	0:37; 3rd	31:48; 2nd	1:52:41.49	2nd place, silver medalist(s)
Mariko Adachi	Women's Individual	19:35; 1st	1:18; 6th	1:08:27; 7th	0:46; 4th	35:37; 1st	2:05:44.59	1st place, gold medalist(s)
Akane Tsuchihashi	Women's Individual	19:37; 2nd	1:16; 5th	1:08:27; 6th	0:45; 2nd	36:24; 2nd	2:06:31.56	2nd place, silver medalist(s)

== Volleyball ==
=== Men ===
Team

Akio Nagae
Takeshi Nagano
Naoya Suga
Daisuke Usami
Yoshifumi Suzuki
Yuya Ageba
Takaaki Tomimatsu
Kota Yamamura
Kunihiro Shimizu
Tatsuya Fukuzawa
Yusuke Ishijima
Yuta Yoneyama

Preliminary

Group D

Pos	Team	Pld	W	L	Pts	SPW	SPL	SPR	SW	SL	SR	Qualification
1	Japan	4	4	0	8	307	186	1.651	12	0	MAX	Second round / Group E–F
2	Qatar	4	3	1	7	323	277	1.166	9	5	1.800	Second round / Group E–F
3	Athletes from Kuwait	4	2	2	6	314	312	1.006	8	7	1.143	Second round / Group G–H
4	Myanmar	4	1	3	5	238	299	0.796	4	9	0.444	Second round / Group G–H
5	Hong Kong	4	0	4	4	192	300	0.640	0	12	0.000	

Source: Results

Date	Time		Score		Set 1	Set 2	Set 3	Set 4	Set 5	Total
14 Nov	16:00	Japan	3–0	Myanmar	25–12	25–14	25–9			75–35
15 Nov	18:00	Kuwait	0–3	Japan	19–25	17–25	12–25			48–75
16 Nov	16:00	Japan	3–0	Qatar	25–19	25–15	32–30			82–64
17 Nov	20:00	Hong Kong	0–3	Japan	11–25	16–25	12–25			39–75

Second round

Group F

Pos	Team	Pld	W	L	Pts	SPW	SPL	SPR	SW	SL	SR	Qualification
1	South Korea	3	3	0	6	246	207	1.188	9	1	9.000	Quarterfinals
2	India	3	2	1	5	245	228	1.075	6	5	1.200	Quarterfinals
3	Japan	3	1	2	4	280	272	1.029	6	6	1.000	Quarterfinals
4	Qatar	3	0	3	3	168	232	0.724	0	9	0.000	Quarterfinals

Source: Results

Date	Time		Score		Set 1	Set 2	Set 3	Set 4	Set 5	Total
19 Nov	16:00	Japan	2–3	India	20–25	19–25	25–21	28–26	13–15	105–112
20 Nov	16:00	South Korea	3–1	Japan	25–23	21–25	25–23	25–22		96–93

Quarterfinals

Date	Time		Score		Set 1	Set 2	Set 3	Set 4	Set 5	Total
21 Nov	14:00	China	0–3	Japan	14–25	22–25	23–25			59–75

Semifinals

Date	Time		Score		Set 1	Set 2	Set 3	Set 4	Set 5	Total
24 Nov	18:00	South Korea	2–3	Japan	27–25	25–21	19–25	20–25	12–15	103–111

Gold medal match

Date	Time		Score		Set 1	Set 2	Set 3	Set 4	Set 5	Total
26 Nov	21:00	Japan	3–1	Iran	25–19	25–13	23–25	25–18		98–75

=== Women ===
Team

Hiroko Hakuta
Miku Izuoka
Misato Kimura
Mayumi Kosuge
Saki Minemura
Mariko Mori
Yuki Nishiyama
Rika Nomoto
Sakura Numata
Shoko Omura
Masami Yokoyama
Minami Yoshida

Preliminary

Group B

Pos	Team	Pld	W	L	Pts	SPW	SPL	SPR	SW	SL	SR	Qualification
1	Kazakhstan	5	5	0	10	443	317	1.397	15	4	3.750	Quarterfinals
2	North Korea	5	4	1	9	431	316	1.364	14	5	2.800	Quarterfinals
3	Japan	5	3	2	8	395	344	1.148	10	8	1.250	Quarterfinals
4	Chinese Taipei	5	2	3	7	429	365	1.175	11	9	1.222	Quarterfinals
5	India	5	1	4	6	260	319	0.815	3	12	0.250	Placement 9–11
6	Maldives	5	0	5	5	78	375	0.208	0	15	0.000	Placement 9–11

Source: Results

Date	Time		Score		Set 1	Set 2	Set 3	Set 4	Set 5	Total
18 Nov	14:00	Chinese Taipei	2–3	Japan	25–19	17–25	26–24	17–25	15–17	100–110
19 Nov	20:00	Japan	0–3	North Korea	21–25	17–25	13–25			51–75
20 Nov	16:00	India	0–3	Japan	23–25	16–25	17–25			56–75
21 Nov	14:00	Maldives	0–3	Japan	7–25	1–25	8–25			16–75
22 Nov	16:00	Japan	1–3	Kazakhstan	15–25	25–22	23–25	21–25		84–97

Quarterfinals

Date	Time		Score		Set 1	Set 2	Set 3	Set 4	Set 5	Total
24 Nov	16:00	South Korea	3–0	Japan	25–16	25–22	25–15			75–53

Placement 5–8

Date	Time		Score		Set 1	Set 2	Set 3	Set 4	Set 5	Total
25 Nov	14:00	Mongolia	0–3	Japan	15–25	6–25	11–25			32–75

Placement 5th–6th

Date	Time		Score		Set 1	Set 2	Set 3	Set 4	Set 5	Total
27 Nov	12:30	Japan	1–3	Thailand	12–25	28–26	14–25	26–28		80–104

== Water polo ==
Men

Team

Katsuyuki Tanamura
Mitsuaki Shiga
Kan Irei
Koji Takei
Kan Aoyagi
Hiroki Wakamatsu
Yusuke Shimizu
Akira Yanase
Koji Kobayashi
Yoshinori Shiota
Atsushi Naganuma
Satoshi Nagata
Shota Hazui

Preliminary

Group A

Pos	Team	Pld	W	D	L	GF	GA	GD	Pts	Qualification
1	Japan	4	4	0	0	72	16	+56	8	Quarterfinals
2	China	4	3	0	1	72	16	+56	6	Quarterfinals
3	South Korea	4	2	0	2	54	33	+21	4	Quarterfinals
4	Hong Kong	4	1	0	3	33	73	−40	2	Quarterfinals
5	Qatar	4	0	0	4	5	98	−93	0	

Source: Results

November 18; 15:55	Report	China	9–3	Japan	Tianhe Natatorium, Guangzhou; Referees: Margeta (SLO), Bock (GER)
November 18; 15:55	Report	Score by quarters: 4–2, 0–1, 3–0, 2–0			Tianhe Natatorium, Guangzhou; Referees: Margeta (SLO), Bock (GER)
November 18; 15:55	Report	Liang Z.X. 3	Goals	Aoyagi 3	Tianhe Natatorium, Guangzhou; Referees: Margeta (SLO), Bock (GER)

November 20; 9:00	Report	Japan	30–1	Hong Kong	Tianhe Natatorium, Guangzhou; Referees: Salnichenko (KAZ), Bock (GER)
November 20; 9:00	Report	Score by quarters: 5–1, 10–0, 7–0, 8–0			Tianhe Natatorium, Guangzhou; Referees: Salnichenko (KAZ), Bock (GER)
November 20; 9:00	Report	Aoyagi 5	Goals	Chung K.L. 1	Tianhe Natatorium, Guangzhou; Referees: Salnichenko (KAZ), Bock (GER)

November 21; 14:30	Report	Qatar	2–25	Japan	Tianhe Natatorium, Guangzhou; Referees: Stavridis (GRE), Tan (SIN)
November 21; 14:30	Report	Score by quarters: 1–10, 0–8, 1–3, 0–4			Tianhe Natatorium, Guangzhou; Referees: Stavridis (GRE), Tan (SIN)
November 21; 14:30	Report	Al-Lanjawi 2	Goals	Irei, Takei 5	Tianhe Natatorium, Guangzhou; Referees: Stavridis (GRE), Tan (SIN)

November 22; 9:00	Report	Japan	14–4	South Korea	Tianhe Natatorium, Guangzhou; Referees: Ni (CHN), Stavridis (GRE)
November 22; 9:00	Report	Score by quarters: 7–1, 1–1, 1–0, 5–2			Tianhe Natatorium, Guangzhou; Referees: Ni (CHN), Stavridis (GRE)
November 22; 9:00	Report	Shimizu, Yanase 3	Goals	Park J.J. 2	Tianhe Natatorium, Guangzhou; Referees: Ni (CHN), Stavridis (GRE)

Quarterfinals

November 23; 14:30	Report	Japan	25–3	Singapore	Tianhe Natatorium, Guangzhou; Referees: Shi (CHN), Chung (HKG)
November 23; 14:30	Report	Score by quarters: 5–2, 5–1, 8–0, 7–0			Tianhe Natatorium, Guangzhou; Referees: Shi (CHN), Chung (HKG)
November 23; 14:30	Report	Shiota 5	Goals	Loh Z.Z., Lin Diyan, Lin Diyang 1	Tianhe Natatorium, Guangzhou; Referees: Shi (CHN), Chung (HKG)

Semifinals

November 24; 20:55	Report	Japan	8–10	Kazakhstan	Tianhe Natatorium, Guangzhou; Referees: Bock (GER), Stavridis (GRE)
November 24; 20:55	Report	Score by quarters: 2–3, 3–4, 1–0, 2–3			Tianhe Natatorium, Guangzhou; Referees: Bock (GER), Stavridis (GRE)
November 24; 20:55	Report	Hazui 3	Goals	Gubarev 3	Tianhe Natatorium, Guangzhou; Referees: Bock (GER), Stavridis (GRE)

Bronze medal match

November 25; 19:45	Report	South Korea	5–19	Japan	Tianhe Natatorium, Guangzhou; Referees: Ni (CHN), Margeta (SLO)
November 25; 19:45	Report	Score by quarters: 1–2, 2–5, 0–6, 2–6			Tianhe Natatorium, Guangzhou; Referees: Ni (CHN), Margeta (SLO)
November 25; 19:45	Report	Kang J.W., Lee D.J. 2	Goals	Shimizu 5	Tianhe Natatorium, Guangzhou; Referees: Ni (CHN), Margeta (SLO)

== Weightlifting ==
Athlete	Event	Snatch			Clean & jerk			Total	Rank
Athlete	Event	Attempt 1	Attempt 2	Attempt 3	Attempt 1	Attempt 2	Attempt 3	Total	Rank
Masaharu Yamada	Men's 56 kg	~~103~~	103	106	~~145~~	~~145~~	145	251	7th
Genta Kawabata	Men's 94 kg	140	~~145~~	~~145~~	175	180	~~185~~	320	13th
Kazuomi Ota	Men's +105 kg	173	178	~~182~~	202	~~210~~	210	388	7th
Hiromi Miyake	Women's 53 kg	83	85	~~87~~	105	---	---	190	7th
Mayu Hashida	Women's 58 kg	86	88	90	108	111	~~114~~	201	10th
Ayano Tani	Women's 69 kg	92	95	97	~~118~~	118	121	218	6th

== Wrestling ==
=== Men ===
Freestyle

Athlete	Event	Round of 32	Round of 16	Quarterfinals	Semifinals	Final
Athlete	Event	Opposition Result	Opposition Result	Opposition Result	Opposition Result	Opposition Result
Yasuhiro Inaba	55 kg		Nurlan Makenaliev (KGZ); W PP 3-1	Daulet Niyazbekov (KAZ); W PO 3-0	Yang Kyong-Il (PRK); L ST 0-4	Bronze medal match: Damdinbazaryn Tsogtbaatar (MGL); W PO 3-0 (bronze)
Hiroyuki Oda	60 kg		Bazar Bazarguruev (KGZ); W PO 3-0	Ri Jong-Myong (PRK); W PP 3-1	Dauren Zhumagaziyev (KAZ); W PP 3-1	Ganzorigiin Mandakhnaran (MGL); L VT 0-5 (silver)
Tatsuhiro Yonemitsu	66 kg		Azat Donbaev (KGZ); W PP 3-1	Pradeep Kumar (IND); W PO 3-0	Yang Chun-Song (PRK); W PP 3-1	Mehdi Taghavi (IRI); W PP 3-1 (gold)
Kazuyuki Nagashima	74 kg		BYE	Mazen Kadmani (SYR); W PO 3-0	Dorjvaanchigiin Gombodorj (MGL); W PP 3-1	Sadegh Goudarzi (IRI); L PO 0-3 (silver)
Atsushi Matsumoto	84 kg		Muhammad Inam (PAK); L PP 1-3	Did not advance		
Takao Isokawa	96 kg		BYE	Faisal Al-Ketbi (UAE); W PO 3-0	Kurban Kurbanov (UZB); L PO 0-3	Bronze medal match: Farkhod Anakulov (TJK); W PO 3-0 (bronze)
Nobuyoshi Arakida	120 kg		Liang Lei (CHN); L PP 1-3	Did not advance		

Greco-Roman

Athlete	Event	Round of 16	Quarterfinals	Semifinals	Final
Athlete	Event	Opposition Result	Opposition Result	Opposition Result	Opposition Result
Kohei Hasegawa	55 kg	Marat Karishalov (KAZ); W PO 3-0	Kritsada Kongsrichai (THA); W ST 4-0	Hamid Sourian (IRI); W PP 3-1	Kanybek Zholchubekov (KGZ); W VT 5-0 (gold)
Ryutaro Matsumoto	60 kg	Omid Norouzi (IRI); L PO 0-3	Did not advance	Repechage Round 1 match: Xie Zhen (CHN); W PP 3-1	Bronze medal match: Sanjarbek Jumashev (UZB); W PP 3-1 (bronze)
Tsutomu Fujimura	66 kg	Zheng Pan (TKM); W PO 3-0	Kim Hyeon-Woo (KOR); W PP 3-1	Darkhan Bayakhmetov (IRI); L PO 0-3	Bronze medal match: Besiki Saldadze (UZB); W PP 3-1 (bronze)
Tsukasa Tsurumaki	74 kg	Farshad Alizadeh (IRI); W PP 3-1	Daler Karimov (TJK); W PO 3-0	Azizbek Murodov (UZB); W PP 3-1	Daniar Kobonov (KGZ); L PO 0-3 (silver)
Norikatsu Saikawa	84 kg	Janarbek Kenjeev (KGZ); L PO 0-3	Did not advance		
Katsuya Kitamura	96 kg	Arslan Saparmamedov (TKM); W PP 3-1	Azamat Erkimbaev (KGZ) 'L PO 0-3	Did not advance	
Hirokazu Shinjo	120 kg	Dharmender Dalal (IND); L PP 1-3	Did not advance		

=== Women ===
Freestyle

Athlete	Event	Round of 16	Quarterfinals	Semifinals	Final
Athlete	Event	Opposition Result	Opposition Result	Opposition Result	Opposition Result
Hitomi Sakamoto	48 kg	BYE	Zhao Shasha (CHN); W VT 5-0	So Sim-Hyang (PRK); L PP 1-3	Bronze medal match: Mikhrniso Nurmatova (KGZ); W VT 5-0 (bronze)
Saori Yoshida	55 kg	Batbaatariin Nomin-Erdene (MGL); W PO 3-0	Liliya Shakirova (UZB); W PO 3-0	Pak Yon-Hui (PRK); W VT 5-0	Zhang Lan (CHN); W PO 3-0 (gold)
Mio Nishimaki	63 kg	Try Sothavy (VIE); W PO 3-0	Ochirbatyn Nasanburmaa (MGL); L VT 0-5	Repechage Round 1 match: Chen Meng (CHN); L VT 0-5	Did not advance
Kyoko Hamaguchi	72 kg		Iana Panova (KGZ); W VT 5-0	Li Dan (CHN); L VT 0-5	Bronze medal match: Bae Mi-Kyung (KOR); W VT 5-0 (bronze)

== Wushu ==
=== Men ===
Changquan

Athlete	Event	Changquan		Total	
Athlete	Event	Result	Rank	Result	Rank
Daisuke Ichikizaki	Changquan	9.72	2nd place, silver medalist(s)		

Nanquan\Nangun

Athlete	Event	Nanquan		Nangun		Total	
Athlete	Event	Result	Rank	Result	Rank	Result	Rank
Koki Nakata	Nanquan\Nangun All-Round	9.42	8th	9.68	3rd	19.10	7th

Taijiquan\Taijijian

Athlete	Event	Taijijian		Taijiquan		Total	
Athlete	Event	Result	Rank	Result	Rank	Result	Rank
Yoshihiro Sekiya	Taijiquan\Taijijian All-Round	9.23	14th	9.59	8th	18.82	12th

=== Women ===
Changquan

Athlete	Event	Changquan		Total	
Athlete	Event	Result	Rank	Result	Rank
Yuki Hiraoka	Changquan	9.66	3rd place, bronze medalist(s)		

Taijiquan\Taijijian

Athlete	Event	Taijijian		Taijiquan		Total	
Athlete	Event	Result	Rank	Result	Rank	Result	Rank
Yoshihiro Sekiya	Taijiquan\Taijijian All-Round	9.67	1st	9.67	3rd	18.34	2nd place, silver medalist(s)

Jianshu\Qiangshu

Athlete	Event	Jianshu		Qiangshu		Total	
Athlete	Event	Result	Rank	Result	Rank	Result	Rank
Keiko Yamaguchi	Jianshu\Qiangshu All-Round	9.11	4th	9.65	3rd	18.76	4th
