= China at the 2010 Asian Games =

- IOC code: CHN
- NOC: Chinese Olympic Committee external link (in Chinese and English)

in Guangzhou
- Competitors: 960 in 46 sports
- Flag bearer: Jin Ziwei
- Medals Ranked 1st: Gold 199 Silver 119 Bronze 98 Total 416

Asian Games appearances (overview)
- 1974; 1978; 1982; 1986; 1990; 1994; 1998; 2002; 2006; 2010; 2014; 2018; 2022; 2026

China participated and hosted the 2010 Asian Games in Guangzhou on 12–27 November 2010. China achieved a historic milestone by surpassing the 400-medal threshold in a single edition, so becoming the first nation to do so in the history of the Asian Games.

== Medalists ==
Medals by sport
Sport	Gold medal	Silver medal	Bronze medal	Total
Archery	0	3	0	3
Athletics	13	15	8	36
Badminton	5	3	2	10
Basketball	2	0	0	2
Bowling	0	0	4	4
Boxing	5	3	2	10
Canoeing	9	6	4	19
Chess	3	1	1	5
Cue sports	4	2	2	8
Cycling	7	4	8	19
Dancesport	10	0	0	10
Diving	10	6	0	16
Dragon boat	3	0	2	5
Equestrian	0	1	1	2
Fencing	4	4	8	16
Golf	0	2	0	2
Gymnastics	15	9	1	25
Handball	1	0	0	1
Field hockey	1	0	0	1
Judo	2	1	4	7
Karate	2	0	1	3
Modern pentathlon	3	2	0	5
Roller sports	1	3	5	9
Rowing	10	0	0	10
Rugby union	0	1	0	1
Sailing	4	2	4	10
Sepak takraw	0	2	2	4
Shooting	21	13	11	45
Soft Tennis	1	0	3	4
Softball	0	1	0	1
Swimming	24	16	14	54
Synchronized swimming	3	0	0	3
Table Tennis	7	4	0	11
Taekwondo	4	2	4	10
Tennis	2	1	1	4
Volleyball	3	2	0	5
Water polo	1	1	0	2
Weightlifting	8	2	1	11
Weiqi	0	3	0	3
Wrestling	0	3	4	7
Wushu	9	0	1	10
Weiqi	0	1	0	1
Xiangqi	2	1	1	4
Total	199	119	98	416

Medals by date
Day	Date	Gold medal	Silver medal	Bronze medal	Total
Day 1	13th	19	7	2	28
Day 2	14th	18	7	10	35
Day 3	15th	17	6	7	30
Day 4	16th	23	8	8	39
Day 5	17th	20	11	9	40
Day 6	18th	12	8	10	30
Day 7	19th	17	8	9	34
Day 8	20th	12	10	12	34
Day 9	21st	8	6	3	17
Day 10	22nd	8	6	3	17
Day 11	23rd	11	8	6	25
Day 12	24th	8	8	7	23
Day 13	25th	8	11	5	24
Day 14	26th	16	13	7	36
Day 15	27th	2	2	0	4
Total		199	119	98	416

Multiple gold medalists
Name	Sport	Gold medal	Silver medal	Bronze medal	Total
Tang Yi	Swimming	4	2	0	6
Sui Lu	Artistic gymnastics	4	0	0	4
Teng Haibin	Artistic gymnastics	3	0	1	4
Zhu Qianwei	Swimming	3	0	0	3
Zhao Jing	Swimming	3	0	0	3
Jiao Liuyang	Swimming	3	0	0	3
Jiang Tingting	Synchronized swimming	3	0	0	3
Jiang Wenwen	Synchronized swimming	3	0	0	3
Women's Team	Dragon boat	3	0	0	3
Sun Yang	Swimming	2	2	0	4
Huang Qiushuang	Artistic gymnastics	2	2	0	4
Lü Zhiwu	Swimming	2	1	0	3
Li Zhesi	Swimming	2	1	0	3
Zhao Yunlei	Badminton	2	1	0	3
Feng Zhe	Artistic gymnastics	2	1	0	3
Zhou Jiawei	Swimming	2	0	0	2
Jiang Haiqi	Swimming	2	0	0	2
Ye Shiwen	Swimming	2	0	0	2
Wang Shijia	Swimming	2	0	0	2
Liu Ou	Synchronized swimming	2	0	0	2
Luo Xi	Synchronized swimming	2	0	0	2
Chang Si	Synchronized swimming	2	0	0	2
Wu Yiwen	Synchronized swimming	2	0	0	2
Huang Xuechen	Synchronized swimming	2	0	0	2
Sun Wenyan	Synchronized swimming	2	0	0	2
Chen Xiaojun	Synchronized swimming	2	0	0	2
Yu Lele	Synchronized swimming	2	0	0	2
Lao Yi	Athletics	2	0	0	2
Lin Dan	Badminton	2	0	0	2
Wang Shixian	Badminton	2	0	0	2
Tian Qing	Badminton	2	0	0	2
Hou Yifan	Chess	2	0	0	2
Wang Feng	Canoeing	2	0	0	2
Yu Lamei	Canoeing	2	0	0	2
Zhang Lei	Cycling	2	0	0	2
Shen Hong	Dancesport	2	0	0	2
Liang Yujie	Dancesport	2	0	0	2
Yang Chao	Dancesport	2	0	0	2
Tan Yiling	Dancesport	2	0	0	2
Wang Wei	Dancesport	2	0	0	2
Chen Jin	Dancesport	2	0	0	2
Shi Lei	Dancesport	2	0	0	2
Zhang Baiyu	Dancesport	2	0	0	2
Chen Yibing	Artistic gymnastics	2	0	0	2
Zhang Chenglong	Artistic gymnastics	2	0	0	2
He Kexin	Artistic gymnastics	2	0	0	2

== Aquatics – Diving ==
Men

Athlete	Events	Preliminary		Final	
Athlete	Events	Points	Rank	Points	Rank
He Min	Men's 1 m Individual Springboard			481.20	1st place, gold medalist(s)
Qin Kai	Men's 1 m Individual Springboard			451.20	2nd place, silver medalist(s)
He Chong	Men's 3 m Individual Springboard	468.50	1	525.85	1st place, gold medalist(s)
Luo Yutong	Men's 3 m Individual Springboard	467.95	2	503.15	2nd place, silver medalist(s)
Huo Liang	Men's 10 m Individual Platform	536.10	1	552.50	2nd place, silver medalist(s)
Cao Yuan	Men's 10 m Individual Platform	528.50	2	557.15	1st place, gold medalist(s)
Qin Kai; Luo Yutong	Men's 3 m Synchronised Springboard			459.60	1st place, gold medalist(s)
Yang Ligang; Zhou Luxin	Men's 10 m Synchronised Platform			486.57	1st place, gold medalist(s)

Women

Athlete	Events	Preliminary		Final	
Athlete	Events	Points	Rank	Points	Rank
Wu Minxia	Women's 1 m Individual Springboard			326.15	1st place, gold medalist(s)
Zheng Shuangxue	Women's 1 m Individual Springboard			303.90	2nd place, silver medalist(s)
He Zi	Women's 3 m Individual Springboard	366.90	1	382.00	1st place, gold medalist(s)
Shi Tingmao	Women's 3 m Individual Springboard	356.40	2	359.90	2nd place, silver medalist(s)
Hu Yadan	Women's 10 m Individual Platform	434.55	1	436.70	1st place, gold medalist(s)
Wang Hao	Women's 10 m Individual Platform	397.95	2	426.10	2nd place, silver medalist(s)
Shi Tingmao; Wang Han	3 m Synchronised Springboard			315.60	1st place, gold medalist(s)
Chen Ruolin; Wang Hao	10 m Synchronised Platform			360.06	1st place, gold medalist(s)

== Aquatics – Swimming ==
Men

30 swimmers

Event	Athletes	Heat		Final	
Event	Athletes	Time	Rank	Time	Rank
50 m freestyle	Lü Zhiwu	22.44	1	22.37	1st place, gold medalist(s)
50 m freestyle	Shi Runqiang	23.10	6	22.89	6
100 m freestyle	Shi Tengfei	49.91	2	50.02	4
100 m freestyle	Lü Zhiwu	50.27	3	48.98	2nd place, silver medalist(s)
200 m freestyle	Sun Yang	1:47.85	1	1:46.25	2nd place, silver medalist(s)
200 m freestyle	Zhang Lin	1:48.86	2	1:48.10	4
400 m freestyle	Sun Yang	3:53.08	1	3:42.47	2nd place, silver medalist(s)
400 m freestyle	Zhang Lin	3:54.62	2	3:49.15	3rd place, bronze medalist(s)
1500 m freestyle	Sun Yang			14:35.43 AS	1st place, gold medalist(s)
1500 m freestyle	Zhang Lin			15:22.03	3rd place, bronze medalist(s)
50 m backstroke	Cheng Feiyi	25.74	3	25.30	3rd place, bronze medalist(s)
50 m backstroke	Zhang Yu	26.23	5	25.95	5
100 m backstroke	Sun Xiaolei	55.75	3	54.46	3rd place, bronze medalist(s)
100 m backstroke	He Jianbin	55.91	5	55.36	5
200 m backstroke	Zhang Fenglin	2:00.35	2	1:57.53	2nd place, silver medalist(s)
200 m backstroke	Cheng Feiyi	2:01.31	3	1:58.93	3rd place, bronze medalist(s)
50 m breaststroke	Li Xiayan	27.85	1	27.89	3rd place, bronze medalist(s)
50 m breaststroke	Xie Zhi	28.68	7	27.80	1st place, gold medalist(s)
100 m breaststroke	Ma Xiang	1:02.36	4	1:01.92	5
100 m breaststroke	Wang Shuai	1:02.92	7	1:01.71	3rd place, bronze medalist(s)
200 m breaststroke	Xue Ruipeng	2:15.20	1	2:12.25	2nd place, silver medalist(s)
200 m breaststroke	Xie Zhi	2:15.59	4	2:12.37	4
50 m butterfly	Zhou Jiawei	24.23	1	23.66	1st place, gold medalist(s)
50 m butterfly	Chen Weiwu	24.42	2	24.43	5
100 m butterfly	Zhou Jiawei	53.03	2	51.83	1st place, gold medalist(s)
100 m butterfly	Wu Peng	53.85	5	52.72	3rd place, bronze medalist(s)
200 m butterfly	Chen Yin	1:59.23	5	1:55.29	3rd place, bronze medalist(s)
200 m butterfly	Wu Peng	1:58.46	3	1:55.34	4
200 m individual medley	Wang Shun	2:03.72	2	1:59.72	2nd place, silver medalist(s)
200 m individual medley	Zhang Zishan	2:04.28	3	2:01.52	4
400 m individual medley	Huang Chaosheng	4:21.52	1	4:13.38	2nd place, silver medalist(s)
400 m individual medley	Wang Chengxiang	4:25.42	5	4:19.65	4
4×100 m freestyle	Shi Tengfei; Jiang Haiqi; Shi Runqiang; Lü Zhiwu; Chen Zuo*; Liu Junwu*	3:18.80; Chen 50.22; Liu 49.65; Shi R 49.53; Jiang 49.40	1	3:16.34; Shi T 49.80; Jiang 48.71; Shi R 49.25; Lu 48.58	1st place, gold medalist(s)
4×200 m freestyle	Zhang Lin; Jiang Haiqi; Li Yunqi; Sun Yang; Dai Jun*; Jiang Yuhui*; Zhang Enjian*	7:19.30; Jiang H 1:48.08; Dai 1:49.66; Jiang Y 1:50.59; Zhang E 1:50.97	2	7:07.68; Zhang L 1:47.30; Jiang H 1:46.64; Li 1:48.09; Sun 1:45.65	1st place, gold medalist(s)
4×100 m medley	Sun Xiaolei; Wang Shuai; Zhou Jiawei; Lü Zhiwu; He Jianbin*; Xue Ruipeng*; Chen Weiwu*; Shi Tengfei*	3:45.78; He 55.96; Xue 1:06.02; Chen 53.67; Shi 50.13	2	DSQ	

Women

22 swimmers

Event	Athletes	Heat		Final	
Event	Athletes	Time	Rank	Time	Rank
50 m freestyle	Li Zhesi	25.41	1	24.97	1st place, gold medalist(s)
50 m freestyle	Tang Yi	25.55	2	25.22	2nd place, silver medalist(s)
100 m freestyle	Tang Yi	55.10	1	54.12	1st place, gold medalist(s)
100 m freestyle	Li Zhesi	56.11	4	54.84	2nd place, silver medalist(s)
200 m freestyle	Zhu Qianwei	1:59.83	1	1:56.65	1st place, gold medalist(s)
200 m freestyle	Tang Yi	2:03.28	5	1:57.08	2nd place, silver medalist(s)
400 m freestyle	Shao Yiwen	4:15.91	1	4:05.58	1st place, gold medalist(s)
400 m freestyle	Liu Jing	4:16.97	2	4:08.89	2nd place, silver medalist(s)
800 m freestyle	Li Xuanxu			8:23.55	1st place, gold medalist(s)
800 m freestyle	Shao Yiwen			8:24.14	2nd place, silver medalist(s)
50 m backstroke	Xu Tianlongzi	28.17	1	28.14	3rd place, bronze medalist(s)
50 m backstroke	Gao Chang	28.33	2	27.45	1st place, gold medalist(s)
100 m backstroke	Gao Chang	1:02.49	3	59.90	3rd place, bronze medalist(s)
100 m backstroke	Zhao Jing	1:03.05	4	59.20	1st place, gold medalist(s)
200 m backstroke	Zhou Yanxin	2:10.83	2	2:10.16	4
200 m backstroke	Zhao Jing	2:13.66	3	2:06.46 AS	1st place, gold medalist(s)
50 m breaststroke	Zhao Jin	31.14	1	31.13	2nd place, silver medalist(s)
50 m breaststroke	Wang Randi	31.41	2	31.04	1st place, gold medalist(s)
100 m breaststroke	Ji Liping	1:09.43	3	1:06.91	1st place, gold medalist(s)
100 m breaststroke	Chen Huijia	1:10.61	6	1:07.98	3rd place, bronze medalist(s)
200 m breaststroke	Sun Ye	2:30.95	5	2:25.27	2nd place, silver medalist(s)
200 m breaststroke	Ji Liping	2:31.91	6	2:25.40	3rd place, bronze medalist(s)
50 m butterfly	Lu Ying	26.52	1	26.29	3rd place, bronze medalist(s)
50 m butterfly	Jiao Liuyang	26.66	4	26.55	4
100 m butterfly	Jiao Liuyang	59.03	2	57.76	1st place, gold medalist(s)
100 m butterfly	Guo Fan	59.51	5	59.45	5
200 m butterfly	Jiao Liuyang	2:09.16	1	2:05.79	1st place, gold medalist(s)
200 m butterfly	Zhu Jiani	2:11.11	3	2:11.94	6
200 m individual medley	Ye Shiwen	2:15.74	1	2:09.37	1st place, gold medalist(s)
200 m individual medley	Wang Qun	2:16.41	2	2:12.02	2nd place, silver medalist(s)
400 m individual medley	Ye Shiwen	4:44.09	1	4:33.79	1st place, gold medalist(s)
400 m individual medley	Li Xuanxu	4:45.42	3	4:38.05	2nd place, silver medalist(s)
4×100 m freestyle	Li Zhesi; Wang Shijia; Zhu Qianwei; Tang Yi			3:36.88; Li 54.87; Wang 54.28; Zhu 54.17; Tang 53.56	1st place, gold medalist(s)
4×200 m freestyle	Zhu Qianwei; Liu Jing; Wang Shijia; Tang Yi			7:51.81; Zhu 1:57.04; Liu 1:58.07; Wang 1:58.18; Tang 1:58.52	1st place, gold medalist(s)
4×100 m medley	Zhao Jing; Chen Huijia; Jiao Liuyang; Tang Yi			3:57.80; Zhao 58.94 AS; Chen 1:07.52; Jiao 57.32; Tang 54.02	1st place, gold medalist(s)

* Participated in the heats only.

== Aquatics – Synchronized swimming ==
Athlete	Event	Technical Routine		Free Routine		Total	
Athlete	Event	Points	Rank	Points	Rank	Points	Rank
Jiang Tingting, Jiang Wenwen	Women's Duet	96.375	1	97.000	1	193.375	1st place, gold medalist(s)
Liu Ou, Luo Xi, Chang Si, Jiang Tingting, Jiang Wenwen; Wu Yiwen, Huang Xuechen, Sun Wenyan, Chen Xiaojun, Yu Lele	Women's Team	95.375	1	96.625	1	192.000	1st place, gold medalist(s)
Liu Ou, Luo Xi, Chang Si, Jiang Tingting, Jiang Wenwen, Wu Yiwen; Huang Xuechen, Sun Wenyan, Fan Jiachen, Chen Xiaojun, Yu Lele	Women's Combination					97.125	1st place, gold medalist(s)

== Aquatics – Water polo ==
=== Men ===
Group A

Pos	Team	Pld	W	D	L	GF	GA	GD	Pts	Qualification
1	Japan	4	4	0	0	72	16	+56	8	Quarterfinals
2	China	4	3	0	1	72	16	+56	6	Quarterfinals
3	South Korea	4	2	0	2	54	33	+21	4	Quarterfinals
4	Hong Kong	4	1	0	3	33	73	−40	2	Quarterfinals
5	Qatar	4	0	0	4	5	98	−93	0	

Source: Results

November 18; 15:55	Report	China	9–3	Japan	Tianhe Natatorium, Guangzhou; Referees: Margeta (SLO), Bock (GER)
November 18; 15:55	Report	Score by quarters: 4–2, 0–1, 3–0, 2–0			Tianhe Natatorium, Guangzhou; Referees: Margeta (SLO), Bock (GER)
November 18; 15:55	Report	Liang Z.X. 3	Goals	Aoyagi 3	Tianhe Natatorium, Guangzhou; Referees: Margeta (SLO), Bock (GER)

November 19; 15:55	Report	Hong Kong	6–24	China	Tianhe Natatorium, Guangzhou; Referees: Tan (SIN), Al-Saad (KUW)
November 19; 15:55	Report	Score by quarters: 1–8, 1–6, 3–5, 1–5			Tianhe Natatorium, Guangzhou; Referees: Tan (SIN), Al-Saad (KUW)
November 19; 15:55	Report	K. Cheng 2	Goals	Jiang B. 5	Tianhe Natatorium, Guangzhou; Referees: Tan (SIN), Al-Saad (KUW)

November 20; 15:55	Report	China	26–1	Qatar	Tianhe Natatorium, Guangzhou; Referees: Al-Sheaifi (KSA), Koganov (AZE)
November 20; 15:55	Report	Score by quarters: 7–0, 8–1, 7–0, 4–0			Tianhe Natatorium, Guangzhou; Referees: Al-Sheaifi (KSA), Koganov (AZE)
November 20; 15:55	Report	Xie J.M. 5	Goals	Al-Sulaiti 1	Tianhe Natatorium, Guangzhou; Referees: Al-Sheaifi (KSA), Koganov (AZE)

November 21; 15:55	Report	South Korea	6–13	China	Tianhe Natatorium, Guangzhou; Referees: Margeta (SLO), Makihashi (JPN)
November 21; 15:55	Report	Score by quarters: 1–3, 0–2, 2–2, 3–6			Tianhe Natatorium, Guangzhou; Referees: Margeta (SLO), Makihashi (JPN)
November 21; 15:55	Report	Gwon Y.G., Lee D.J. 2	Goals	Tan F.H. 3	Tianhe Natatorium, Guangzhou; Referees: Margeta (SLO), Makihashi (JPN)

Quarterfinals

November 23; 15:55	Report	China	22–2	Saudi Arabia	Tianhe Natatorium, Guangzhou; Referees: Lee (KOR), Tan (SIN)
November 23; 15:55	Report	Score by quarters: 6–0, 4–2, 6–0, 6–0			Tianhe Natatorium, Guangzhou; Referees: Lee (KOR), Tan (SIN)
November 23; 15:55	Report	4 Players 3	Goals	Al-Dughather, Al-Laili 1	Tianhe Natatorium, Guangzhou; Referees: Lee (KOR), Tan (SIN)

Semifinals

November 24; 19:30	Report	China	22–9	South Korea	Tianhe Natatorium, Guangzhou; Referees: Makihashi (JPN), Tan (SIN)
November 24; 19:30	Report	Score by quarters: 6–1, 5–1, 8–3, 3–4			Tianhe Natatorium, Guangzhou; Referees: Makihashi (JPN), Tan (SIN)
November 24; 19:30	Report	Tan F.H., Pan N. 4	Goals	Kim H.J., Park B.S. 2	Tianhe Natatorium, Guangzhou; Referees: Makihashi (JPN), Tan (SIN)

Gold medal match

November 25; 21:10	Report	China	6–7	Kazakhstan	Tianhe Natatorium, Guangzhou; Referees: Stavridis (GRE), Koganov (AZE)
November 25; 21:10	Report	Score by quarters: 4–2, 1–2, 0–1, 1–2			Tianhe Natatorium, Guangzhou; Referees: Stavridis (GRE), Koganov (AZE)
November 25; 21:10	Report	Pan N. 4	Goals	Zhilyayev 2	Tianhe Natatorium, Guangzhou; Referees: Stavridis (GRE), Koganov (AZE)

=== Women ===
Pos	Team	Pld	W	D	L	GF	GA	GD	Pts
1	China	3	3	0	0	76	8	+68	6
2	Kazakhstan	3	2	0	1	57	20	+37	4
3	Uzbekistan	3	1	0	2	26	41	−15	2
4	India	3	0	0	3	6	96	−90	0

Source: Results

November 15; 15:55	Report	China	25–1	Uzbekistan	Tianhe Natatorium, Guangzhou; Referees: Bock (GER), Stavridis (GRE)
November 15; 15:55	Report	Score by quarters: 7–0, 5–0, 5–0, 8–1			Tianhe Natatorium, Guangzhou; Referees: Bock (GER), Stavridis (GRE)
November 15; 15:55	Report	Teng F., Sun Y.J. 6	Goals	Sarancha 1	Tianhe Natatorium, Guangzhou; Referees: Bock (GER), Stavridis (GRE)

November 16; 15:55	Report	China	38–2	India	Tianhe Natatorium, Guangzhou; Referees: Makihashi (JPN), Salnichenko (KAZ)
November 16; 15:55	Report	Score by quarters: 10–0, 12–1, 8–1, 8–0			Tianhe Natatorium, Guangzhou; Referees: Makihashi (JPN), Salnichenko (KAZ)
November 16; 15:55	Report	Song D.L. 12	Goals	Gudhekar, M. Gubbi 1	Tianhe Natatorium, Guangzhou; Referees: Makihashi (JPN), Salnichenko (KAZ)

November 17; 15:55	Report	China	13–5	Kazakhstan	Tianhe Natatorium, Guangzhou; Referees: Bock (GER), Margeta (SLO)
November 17; 15:55	Report	Score by quarters: 4–1, 3–2, 1–1, 5–1			Tianhe Natatorium, Guangzhou; Referees: Bock (GER), Margeta (SLO)
November 17; 15:55	Report	Teng F. 3	Goals	Shepelina, Chebotova 2	Tianhe Natatorium, Guangzhou; Referees: Bock (GER), Margeta (SLO)

== Archery ==
Men

Athlete	Event	Ranking Round		Round of 64	Round of 32	Round of 16	Quarterfinals	Semifinals	Final	
Athlete	Event	Score	Seed	Opposition Score	Opposition Score	Opposition Score	Opposition Score	Opposition Score	Opposition Score	Rank
Chen Wenyuan	Individual	1348	5	Bye	Shamsudinov (TJK); W 4–0	Gombodorj (MGL); W 6–2	Sung (TPE); L 2–6	did not advance		
Xing Yu	Individual	1348	7	Bye	Sojeb (BAN); W 4–0	Saidiyev (KAZ); W 6–0	Furukawa (JPN); W 6–2	Kim (KOR); L 2–6	Sung (TPE); L 5–6	4
Dai Xiaoxiang	Individual	1330	13	did not advance						
Zhao Shenzhou	Individual	1307	22	did not advance						
'Dai Xiaoxiang; Chen Wenyuan; Xing Yu	Team	4026	2	—N/a	—N/a	Sri Lanka (SRI); W 221–201	Malaysia (MAS); W 224–220	Chinese Taipei (TPE); W 221–214	South Korea (KOR); L 218–222	2nd place, silver medalist(s)

Women

Athlete	Event	Ranking Round		Round of 32	Round of 16	Quarterfinals	Semifinals	Final	
Athlete	Event	Score	Seed	Opposition Score	Opposition Score	Opposition Score	Opposition Score	Opposition Score	Rank
Cheng Ming	Individual	1325	9	Salgado (SRI); W 4–0	Rochmawati (INA); W 7–3	Ki (KOR); W 6–4	Kwon (PRK); W 7–1	Yun (KOR); L 0–6	2nd place, silver medalist(s)
Zhang Yunlu	Individual	1323	11	Zubaydova (TJK); W 4–2	Tukebayeva (KAZ); L 1–7	did not advance			
Yang Jianping	Individual	1320	12	did not advance					
Zhu Shanshan	Individual	1293	20	did not advance					
Zhang Yunlu; Cheng Ming; Zhu Shanshan	Team	3941	3	—N/a	Bye	Kazakhstan (KAZ); W 214–200	Chinese Taipei (TPE); W 220–219	South Korea (KOR); L 220 (55)–220 (58)	2nd place, silver medalist(s)

== Athletics ==
Total: 70 athletes

=== Men ===
Track events

Event	Athletes	Heat Round 1		Semifinal		Final	
Event	Athletes	Result	Rank	Result	Rank	Result	Rank
100 m	Lao Yi	10.34	1	10.28	1	10.24	1st place, gold medalist(s)
100 m	Zheng Dongsheng	10.41	1	10.44	2	10.38	7
200 m	Liang Jiahong	21.05	2			21.02	4
400 m	Liu Xiaosheng	46.76	2			46.34	4
400 m	Chang Pengben	46.58	3			46.65	5
800 m	Yang Xiaofei	1:48.02	5			did not advance	
800 m	Zhang Haikun	1:50:01	4			did not advance	
1500 m	Zhang Haikun	3:46.01	3			3:41.67	5
110 m hurdles	Liu Xiang	13.48	1			13.09	1st place, gold medalist(s)
110 m hurdles	Shi Dongpeng	13.89	2			13.38	2nd place, silver medalist(s)
400 m hurdles	Meng Yan	51.32	2			did not start	
3000 m steeplechase	Yang Tao					9:09.50	10
4x100 m relay	Lu Bin; Liang Jiahong; Su Bintian; Lao Yi	39.03	1			38.78	1st place, gold medalist(s)
4x400 m relay	You Cheng; Lin Yang; Deng Shijie; Chang Pengben; Liu Xiaosheng	3:06.62	2			3:03.66	3rd place, bronze medalist(s)

Field events

Event	Athletes	Qualification		Final	
Event	Athletes	Result	Rank	Result	Rank
Long jump	Su Xiongfeng			8.05	2nd place, silver medalist(s)
Long jump	Li Jinzhe			NM	-
Triple jump	Cao Shuo			16.84	3rd place, bronze medalist(s)
Triple jump	Li Yanxi			16.94	1st place, gold medalist(s)
High jump	Huang Haiqiang	2.15	1	2.19	3rd place, bronze medalist(s)
Pole vault	Yang Yansheng			5.50	1st place, gold medalist(s)
Pole vault	Lu Yao			4.80	9
Shot put	Zhang Jun			19.59	2nd place, silver medalist(s)
Javelin throw	Qin Qiang			78.51	4
Javelin throw	Jiang Xingyu			77.17	5

Road events

Event	Athletes		
Event	Athletes	Final	
Event	Athletes	Result	Rank
Marathon	Dong Guojian	2:14:48	4
Marathon	Ren Longyun	2:18:43	8
20 km walk	Wang Hao	1:20:50	1st place, gold medalist(s)
20 km walk	Chu Yafei	1:21:57	2nd place, silver medalist(s)
50 km walk	Si Tianfeng	3:47:07	1st place, gold medalist(s)
50 km walk	Li Lei	3:47:34	2nd place, silver medalist(s)

Combined events

Decathlon
Event	Yu Bin		
Event	Results	Points	Rank
100 m	10.97	867	5
Long jump	7.14	847	5
Shot put	13.81	717	6
High jump	1.85	670	8
400 m	50.31	800	3
110 m hurdles	14.75	880	2
Discus throw	42.82	722	4
Pole vault	4.50	760	6
Javelin throw	63.18	786	2
1500 m	5:04.04	537	5
Final Total		7586	5

=== Women ===
Track events

Event	Athletes	Heat Round 1		Semifinal		Final	
Event	Athletes	Result	Rank	Result	Rank	Result	Rank
100 m	Tao Yujia	11.74	2	11.65	4	11.63	5
100 m	Ye Jiabei	11.84	3	11.77	3	11.71	7
200 m	Liang Qiuping	24.28	2			24.13	7
400 m	Chen Lin	53.88	2			53.82	7
400 m	Tang Xiaoyin	53.26	5			53.55	6
800 m	Zhang Liqiu	2:07.04	3			did not advance	
1500 m	Su Qian					4:11.76	4
5000 m	Xue Fei					15:44.09	7
5000 m	Jia Chaofeng					16:07.26	9
10000 m	Zhang Xin					33:19.61	10
10000 m	Bai Xue					32:39.13	8
100 m hurdles	Sun Yawei	13.15	1			13.27	3rd place, bronze medalist(s)
400 m hurdles	Wang Xing	57.14	3			56.76	2nd place, silver medalist(s)
400 m hurdles	Yang Qi	57.71	3			58.67	8
3000 m steeplechase	Jin Yuan					9:55.71	2nd place, silver medalist(s)
4x100 m relay	Tao Yujia; Liang Qiuping; Jiang Lan; Ye Jiabei	44.78	2			44.22	2nd place, silver medalist(s)
4x400 m relay	Zheng Zhihui; Tang Xiaoyin; Chen Lin; Chen Jingwen					3:30.89	3rd place, bronze medalist(s)

Field events

Event	Athletes	Final	
Event	Athletes	Result	Rank
High jump	Zheng Xingjuan	1.90	3rd place, bronze medalist(s)
Long jump	Lu Minxia	6.36	6
Long jump	Chen Yaling	6.10	10
Triple jump	Xie Limei	14.18	2nd place, silver medalist(s)
Triple jump	Chen Yufei	13.39	5
Pole vault	Li Caixia	4.30	1st place, gold medalist(s)
Pole vault	Li Ling^{1}	4.30	2nd place, silver medalist(s)
Shot put	Li Ling^{2}	19.94	1st place, gold medalist(s)
Shot put	Gong Lijiao	19.67	2nd place, silver medalist(s)
Discus throw	Li Yanfeng	66.18	1st place, gold medalist(s)
Discus throw	Song Aimin	64.04	2nd place, silver medalist(s)
Hammer throw	Zhang Wenxiu	72.84	1st place, gold medalist(s)
Hammer throw	Wang Zheng	68.17	2nd place, silver medalist(s)
Javelin throw	Xue Juan	58.72	2nd place, silver medalist(s)
Javelin throw	Li Lingwei	57.51	3rd place, bronze medalist(s)

Road events

Event	Athletes		
Event	Athletes	Final	
Event	Athletes	Result	Rank
Marathon	Zhou Chunxiu	2:25:00	1st place, gold medalist(s)
Marathon	Zhu Xiaolin	2:26:35	2nd place, silver medalist(s)
20 km walk	Liu Hong	1:30:06	1st place, gold medalist(s)
20 km walk	Li Yanfei	1:32:34	3rd place, bronze medalist(s)

== Badminton ==
Men

Athlete	Event	Round of 32	Round of 16	Quarterfinals	Semifinals	Final	
Athlete	Event	Opposition Score	Opposition Score	Opposition Score	Opposition Score	Opposition Score	Rank
(3) Chen Jin	Singles	Bye	Lee (KOR); W 21–17, 21–11	Chou (TPE); W 21–19, 21–14	Lee (MAS); L 21–14, 15–21, 7–21	Did not advance	3rd place, bronze medalist(s)
(2) Lin Dan	Singles	Bye	Hu (HKG); W 21–6, 21–13	Nguyen (VIE); W 21–9, 21–16	Park (KOR); W 21–14, 21–10	Lee (MAS); W 21–13, 15–21, 21–10	1st place, gold medalist(s)
(7) Fu Haifeng; Cai Yun	Doubles	Bye	Wiratama and Wong (HKG); W 21–14, 21–17	Jung and Lee (KOR); L 16–21, 12–21	did not advance		
(5) Guo Zhendong; Xu Chen	Doubles	Bye	Anugritayawon and Prapakamol (THA); W 21–12, 21–17	Ahsan and Yulianto (INA); L 21–14, 19–21, 16–21	did not advance		
China	Team		Bye	Hong Kong; W 3–0	Indonesia; W 3–0	South Korea; W 3–1	1st place, gold medalist(s)

Women

Athlete	Event	Round of 32	Round of 16	Quarterfinals	Semifinals	Final	
Athlete	Event	Opposition Score	Opposition Score	Opposition Score	Opposition Score	Opposition Score	Rank
(1) Wang Xin	Singles	Bye	Hung (TPE); W 21–8, 21–14	Bae (KOR); W 21–17, 22–20	Hirose (JPN); W 21–7, 21–15	Wang (CHN); L 18–21, 15–21	2nd place, silver medalist(s)
(3) Wang Shixian	Singles	Bye	Buranaprasertsuk (THA); W 19–21, 21–9, 21–12	Goto (JPN); W 21–5, 21–13	Yip (HKG); W 21–14, 21–14	Wang (CHN); W 21–18, 21–15	1st place, gold medalist(s)
(5) Wang Xiaoli; Yu Yang	Doubles	Bye	Irawati and Maheswari (INA); W 21–10, 21–11	Cheng and Chien (TPE); W 21–18, 21–16	Ha and Lee (KOR); W 21–17, 21–14	Tian and Zhao (CHN); L 22–20, 15–21, 12–21	2nd place, silver medalist(s)
(2) Tian Qing; Zhao Yunlei	Doubles	Bye	Gutta and Ponnappa (IND); W 21–10, 21–5	Sari and Yao (SIN); W 21–8, 21–11	Kim and Lee (KOR); W 21–9, 21–12	Wang and Yu (CHN); W 20–22, 21–15, 21–12	1st place, gold medalist(s)
China	Team		Bye	Macau; W/O	South Korea; W 3–0	Thailand; W 3–0	1st place, gold medalist(s)

Mixed

Athlete	Event	Round of 32	Round of 16	Quarterfinals	Semifinals	Final	
Athlete	Event	Opposition Score	Opposition Score	Opposition Score	Opposition Score	Opposition Score	Rank
He Hanbin; Ma Jin	Doubles	Wong and Chau (HKG); W 21–18, 21–14	Teng and Bernadet (INA); W 15–21, 21–18, 21–16	Lee and Chien (TPE); W 21–17, 21–15	Shin and Lee (KOR); L 22–20, 18–21, 20–22	Did not advance	3rd place, bronze medalist(s)
Zhang Nan; Zhao Yunlei	Doubles	Bye	Ikeda and Shiota (JPN); W 17–21, 21–12, 21–17	Ko and Ha (KOR); W 21–14, 15–21, 21–14	Chen and Cheng (TPE); W 21–16, 21–15	Shin and Lee (KOR); L 19–21, 14–21	2nd place, silver medalist(s)

== Baseball ==
Group A

Pos	Team	Pld	W	L	RF	RA	PCT	GB	Qualification
1	Japan	3	3	0	45	0	1.000	—	Semifinals
2	China	3	2	1	22	3	.667	1	Semifinals
3	Thailand	3	1	2	25	25	.333	2	
4	Mongolia	3	0	3	0	64	.000	3	

Source: Results

November 14, 2010 — 12:00

Team	1	2	3	4	5	6	7	8	9	R	H	E
Mongolia	0	0	0	0	0	-	-	-	-	0	1	4
China	4	9	1	0	1	-	-	-	-	15	10	0
WP: Lu Jiangang LP: Khatanbaatar Batbold

November 15, 2010 — 18:00

Team	1	2	3	4	5	6	7	8	9	R	H	E
China	0	0	0	0	0	0	0	0	0	0	8	0
Japan	0	0	0	0	0	0	0	3	x	3	8	0
WP: Hirofumi Yamanaka LP: Li Shuai; Home runs: Away: None; Home: JPN: Toshiyuki Hayashi (1)

November 16, 2010 — 18:00

Team	1	2	3	4	5	6	7	8	9	R	H	E
Thailand	0	0	0	0	0	0	0	0	0	0	5	1
China	0	2	3	2	0	0	0	0	x	7	12	0
WP: Bu Tao LP: Nattapong Meeboonrod

Semifinals

November 18, 2010 — 12:00

Team	1	2	3	4	5	6	7	8	9	R	H	E
China	0	0	1	0	0	0	0	0	0	1	4	1
South Korea	0	2	1	0	3	0	1	0	x	7	10	0
WP: Yang Hyeon-Jong LP: Lu Jiangang; Home runs: Away: None; Home: Choo Shin-Soo (3)

Bronze medal match

November 19, 2010 — 12:00

Team	1	2	3	4	5	6	7	8	9	R	H	E
China	0	0	0	0	2	0	0	0	0	2	8	0
Japan	5	1	0	0	0	0	0	0	x	6	9	0
WP: Kota Suda LP: Wang Pei

== Basketball ==
=== Men ===
Group E

Team	Pld	W	L	PF	PA	PD	Pts
China	5	5	0	462	258	+204	10
South Korea	5	4	1	475	311	+164	9
Jordan	5	3	2	339	403	−64	8
North Korea	5	2	3	377	421	−44	7
Mongolia	5	1	4	310	438	−128	6
Uzbekistan	5	0	5	283	415	−132	5

November 16
19:15

China	91–46	Mongolia
Scoring by quarter: 22–8, 26–13, 19–13, 24–12
Pts: Zhou P. 16; Rebs: Li X.X. 9 Asts: Zhang Bo 4		Pts: Ikhbayar 8 Rebs: Sainbayar 7 Asts: Badrakh 2

International Sports Arena, Guangzhou
Referees: Pablo Estevez (ARG), Amir Hossein Safarzadeh (IRI), Teerapong Yodsint (THA)

November 17
19:15

North Korea	62–98	China
Scoring by quarter: 23–14, 26–14, 19–18, 22–22
Pts: Pak U.C. 19; Rebs: Sin K.B. 8 Asts: O J.H., An Y.B., Sin K.B. 2		Pts: Wang Z.Z. 14; Rebs: Li X.X. 9 Asts: Zhang B. 5

International Sports Arena, Guangzhou
Referees: Borys Shulga (UKR), Wu Ying-wei (TPE), Prakash Sandou (IND)

November 19
19:15

China	96–31	Uzbekistan
Scoring by quarter: 26–15, 22–4, 29–10, 19–2
Pts: Wang S.P. 20; Rebs: Zhang Z.X. 11; Asts: Zhang Q.P., Wang Z.Z. 5		Pts: Juginisov 13; Rebs: Sharafutdinov 6 Asts: Pereverzev 2

International Sports Arena, Guangzhou
Referees: Lau Cheuk Fai (HKG), Naohiko Uchihara (JPN), Yasser Abbas (QAT)

November 21
19:15

South Korea	66–76	China
Scoring by quarter: 22–19, 13–19, 18–21, 13–17
Pts: Kim J.S. 18; Rebs: Yang H.J. 7 Asts: Yang D.G. 7		Pts: Sun Y. 19; Rebs: Wang Z.Z. 7 Asts: Sun Y. 3

International Sports Arena, Guangzhou
Referees: Cristiano Maranho (BRA), Amir Hossein Safarzadeh (IRI), Ferdinand Pascual (PHI)

Quarterfinals

November 24
21:30

China	71–66	Qatar
Scoring by quarter: 20–16, 16–9, 19–22, 16–19
Pts: Wang Z.Z. 18; Rebs: Wang Z.Z. 9 Asts: Liu W. 6		Pts: Ngombo 24; Rebs: Ismail 17; Asts: Ismail 2

Huangpu Gymnasium, Guangzhou
Referees: Pablo Estevez (ARG), Teerapong Yodsint (THA), Mohammad Al-Amiri (KUW)

Semifinals

November 25
15:30

Iran	65–68	China
Scoring by quarter: 12–8, 16–21, 19–19, 20–18
Pts: Kamrani 19; Rebs: Kardoust 9 Asts: Davoudi, Sahakian 2		Pts: Wang S.P. 20; Rebs: Wang Z.Z. 9 Asts: Wang Z.Z. 2

International Sports Arena, Guangzhou
Referees: Cristiano Maranho (BRA), Ferdinand Pascual (PHI), Ravshan Ganiev (UZB)

Gold Medal Match

November 26
19:00

South Korea	71–77	China
Scoring by quarter: 21–27, 16–16, 19–21, 15–13
Pts: Yang D.G. 17; Rebs: Kim J.S., Yang H.J., Lee S.J. 4 Asts: Yang D.G., Yang H.J. 4		Pts: Wang Z.Z. 20; Rebs: Ding J.H. 8 Asts: Sun Y. 4

International Sports Arena, Guangzhou
Referees: Pablo Estevez (ARG), Cristiano Maranho (BRA), Borys Shulga (UKR)

=== Women ===
Group A

Team	Pld	W	L	PF	PA	PD	Pts
China	3	3	0	277	146	+131	6
South Korea	3	2	1	255	171	+84	5
Thailand	3	1	2	160	245	−85	4
India	3	0	3	137	267	−130	3

November 18
19:15

China	107–39	India
Scoring by quarter: 29–8, 27–13, 28–15, 23–3
Pts: Guan X. 16; Rebs: Chen N. 9 Asts: Zhang H.L. 5		Pts: Jose 12; Rebs: Jose, Pt. Singh 5 Asts: A. Singh, Durai, Sidhu 1

Huangpu Gymnasium, Guangzhou
Referees: Elena Chernova (RUS), Yoko Tomita (JPN), Amir Hossein Safarzadeh (IRI)

November 20
19:15

Thailand	43–98	China
Scoring by quarter: 9–29, 18–27, 10–22, 6–20
Pts: Suksomwong 16; Rebs: Saechua, Mathuros, Sangkhum 3 Asts: 4 Players 2		Pts: Miao L.J., Liu D. 12; Rebs: 4 Players 5 Asts: Zhang F. 3

Huangpu Gymnasium, Guangzhou
Referees: Nadine Crowley (CAN), Pak Jong-Sik (PRK), Fong Kin Lung (HKG)

November 22
14:15

China	72–64	South Korea
Scoring by quarter: 21–20, 20–15, 19–17, 12–12
Pts: Chen N. 29; Rebs: Guan X. 13; Asts: Miao L.J. 5		Pts: Kim D.B. 17; Rebs: Jung S.H. 4 Asts: 4 Players 1

Huangpu Gymnasium, Guangzhou
Referees: Elena Chernova (RUS), Yoko Tomita (JPN), Yasser Abbas (QAT)

Semifinals

November 24
21:30

China	84–58	Chinese Taipei
Scoring by quarter: 16–14, 22–5, 26–15, 20–24
Pts: Zhang W. 25; Rebs: Chen N. 13; Asts: Ding Y. 5		Pts: Peng S.C. 13; Rebs: Tsai P.C. 4 Asts: Chiang F.C., Wen C. 2

International Sports Arena, Guangzhou
Referees: Nadine Crowley (CAN), Lau Cheuk Fai (HKG), Prakash Sandou (IND)

Gold Medal Match

November 25
21:30

South Korea	64–70	China
Scoring by quarter: 16–15, 12–24, 19–12, 17–19
Pts: Beon Y.H. 23; Rebs: Ha E.J. 5 Asts: Lee M.S. 6		Pts: Chen N. 17; Rebs: Chen N. 12; Asts: Miao L.J. 6

International Sports Arena, Guangzhou
Referees: Elena Chernova (RUS), Teerapong Yodsint (THA), Ramesh Kumar (IND)

== Beach volleyball ==
=== Men ===
Athlete	Event	Preliminary Round			Round of 16	Quarterfinals	Semifinals	Finals
Athlete	Event	Opposition Score	Opposition Score	Opposition Score	Opposition Score	Opposition Score	Opposition Score	Opposition Score
Wu Penggen; Xu Linyin	Men's beach volleyball	Aiman Al-Katheri (YEM) and Ashraf Omair (YEM); W 2–0 (21–12, 21–14)	Asanka Pradeep Kumara (SRI) and Pubudu Ekanayaka (SRI); W 2–0 (21–11, 21–11)		Haitham Al-Shereiqi (OMA) and Ahmed Al-Housni (OMA); W 2–0 (21–14, 21–15)	Khalifa Al-Jabri (OMA) and Abdullah Al-Rajhi (OMA); W 2–0 (21–8, 21–10)	Dmitriy Yakovlev (KAZ) and Alexey Kuleshov (KAZ); W 2–1 (21–10, 21–12)	Gao Peng (CHN) and Li Yian (CHN); W 2–0 (25–23, 21–14) (gold)
Gao Peng; Li Yian	Men's beach volleyball	Taing Mengheak (CAM) and Samath Vansak (CAM); W 2–0 (21–15, 21–10)	Nicolau Xavier (TLS) and Feliciano Soares (TLS); W 2–0 (21–9, 21–8)	Reza Naeini (IRI) and Rahman Raoufi (IRI); W 2–0 (21–12, 21–18)	Panupong Toyam (THA) and Niphon Nimnuan (THA); W 2–0 (21–18, 21–13)	Alexandr Dyachenko (KAZ) and Alexey Sidorenko (KAZ); W 2–1 (24–26, 21–15, 15–13)	Kentaro Asahi (JPN) and Katsuhiro Shiratori (JPN); W 2–0 (21–14, 22–20)	Wu Penggen (CHN) and Xu Linyin (CHN); L 0–2 (23–25, 14–21) (silver)

=== Women ===
Athlete	Event	Preliminary Round			Round of 16	Quarterfinals	Semifinals	Finals
Athlete	Event	Opposition Score	Opposition Score	Opposition Score	Opposition Score	Opposition Score	Opposition Score	Opposition Score
Xue Chen; Zhang Xi	Women's beach volleyball	Lyudmila Issayeva (KAZ) and Inna Rakhmatulina (KAZ); W 2–0 (21–10, 21–12)	Lee Hyun-Jung (KOR) and Lee Eun-A (KOR); W 2–0 (21–7, 21–9)	Tse Wing Hung (HKG) and Kong Cheuk Yee (HKG); W 2–0 (21–6, 21–10)	Lee Sun-Hwa (KOR) and Kwak Mi-Jung (KOR); W 2–0 (21–7, 21–7)	Kou Nai-han (TPE) and Chang Hui-min (TPE); W 2–1 (18–21, 21–12, 15–9)	Usa Tenpaksee (THA) and Jarunee Sannok (THA); W 2–0 (21–16, 21–14)	Huang Ying (CHN) and Yue Yuan (CHN); W 2–0 (21–14, 21–13) (gold)
Huang Ying; Yue Yuan	Men's beach volleyball	Luk Teck Hua (MAS) and Beh Shun Thing (MAS); L 2–0 (21–15, 17–21, 12–15)	Alianca Xavier (TLS) and Mariana dos Santos (TLS); W 2–0 (21–2, 21–5)	Shinako Tanaka (JPN) and Sayaka Mizoe (JPN); W 2–0 (21–17, 21–16)	Geethika Gunawardena (SRI) and Sujeewa Wijesinghe (SRI); W 2–0 (21–3, 21–10)	Shinako Tanaka (JPN) and Sayaka Mizoe (JPN); W 2–0 (21–16, 21–19)	Luk Teck Hua (MAS) and Beh Shun Thing (MAS); W 2–0 (21–7, 21–13)	Xue Chen (CHN) and Zhang Xi (CHN); L 0–2 (14–21, 13–21) (silver)

== Board games ==
=== Chess ===
Athlete	Event	Win	Draw	Lost	Points	Finals				
Athlete	Event	Win	Draw	Lost	Points	Win	Draw	Lost	Points	Rank
Bu Xiangzhi	Men's individual rapid	6	1	2	6.5					3rd place, bronze medalist(s)
Ni Hua	Men's individual rapid	4	2	3	5.0					15
Hou Yifan	Women's individual rapid	8	1	0	8.5					1st place, gold medalist(s)
Zhao Xue	Women's individual rapid	7	1	1	7.5					2nd place, silver medalist(s)
China	Men's team classical	7	0	0	14	2	0	0	4	1st place, gold medalist(s)
China	Women's team classical	6	1	0	13	2	0	0	4	1st place, gold medalist(s)

=== Weiqi ===
Athlete	Event	Win	Lost	Points	Rank	Semifinals		Finals		
Athlete	Event	Win	Lost	Points	Rank	Opposition	Result	Opposition	Result	Rank
Xie He; Song Ronghui	Mixed doubles	4	2	8	4	Zhou Junxun and Hei Jiajia (TPE)	W	Park Jeong-Hwan and Lee Seul-A (KOR)	L	2nd place, silver medalist(s)
Liu Xing; Tang Yi	Mixed doubles	4	2	8	5	did not advance				
China	Men's team	6	1	12	2			South Korea	L 1–4	2nd place, silver medalist(s)
China	Women's team	7	0	14	1			South Korea	L 1–2	2nd place, silver medalist(s)

=== Xiangqi ===
Athlete	Event	Round 1	Round 2	Round 3	Round 4	Round 5	Round 6	Round 7	Win	Draw	Lost	Points	Rank
Athlete	Event	Opposition Result	Opposition Result	Opposition Result	Opposition Result	Opposition Result	Opposition Result	Opposition Result	Win	Draw	Lost	Points	Rank
Hong Zhi	Men's individual	Ma (TPE); W	Kuok (MAC); W	Chan (HKG); W	Nguyen (VIE); W	Wu (TPE); D	Woo (SIN); W	Lu (CHN); L	5	1	1	11	1st place, gold medalist(s)
Lu Qin	Men's individual	Chiu (HKG); W	Woo (SIN); D	Wu (TPE); D	Lei (MAC); W	Nguyen (VIE); D	Lai (VIE); D	Hong (CHN); W	3	4	0	10	3rd place, bronze medalist(s)
Tang Dan	Women's individual	Ngo (VIE); W	Gao (TPE); W	Lam (HKG); W	Hoang (VIE); W	Peng (TPE); W	Ikeda (JPN); W	Wang (CHN); W	7	0	0	14	1st place, gold medalist(s)
Wang Linna	Women's individual	Hoang (VIE); W	Peng (TPE); W	Ikeda (JPN); W	Lam (HKG); W	Ngo (VIE); W	Gao (TPE); D	Tang (CHN); L	5	1	1	11	2nd place, silver medalist(s)

== Bowling ==
=== Men ===
Athlete	Event	Games 1–6						Total	Average	Grand Total	Rank
Athlete	Event	1	2	3	4	5	6	Total	Average	Grand Total	Rank
Du Jianchao	Men's singles	200	189	192	217	222	237	1257	209.5		33rd
Zhang Yijia	Men's singles	225	204	188	164	192	225	1198	199.7		58th
Mi Zhongli	Men's singles	199	195	216	188	189	205	1192	198.7		63rd
Zhang Peng	Men's singles	197	236	211	188	163	197	1192	198.7		63rd
Yuehong Pan	Men's singles	178	187	225	227	191	167	1174	195.7		70th
Zhang Yijia; Mi Zhongli	Men's doubles	212	246	258	177	149	200	1242	207.0	2598	9th
Zhang Yijia; Mi Zhongli	Men's doubles	246	182	257	215	222	234	1356	226.6	2598	9th
Zhang Peng; Du Jianchao	Men's doubles	269	268	225	212	234	206	1414	235.7	2622	6th
Zhang Peng; Du Jianchao	Men's doubles	187	227	203	215	184	192	1208	201.3	2622	6th
Yuehong Pan	Men's doubles booster	236	202	210	206	178	172	1204	200.7		
Zhang Peng; Zhang Yijia; Mi Zhongli	Men's trios	216	254	182	221	175	210	1258	209.7	3853	4th
Zhang Peng; Zhang Yijia; Mi Zhongli	Men's trios	214	199	190	197	226	199	1225	204.2	3853	4th
Zhang Peng; Zhang Yijia; Mi Zhongli	Men's trios	226	236	193	241	187	187	1270	211.7	3853	4th
Yuehong Pan	Men's trios booster	183	223	191	181	183	181	1142	190.3		
Du Jianchao	Men's trios booster	247	222	227	234	231	257	1418	236.3		
Zhang Peng; Yuehong Pan; Zhang Yijia; Mi Zhongli; Du Jianchao	Men's team of five	209	215	235	195	180	225	1259	209.8	6317	6th
Zhang Peng; Yuehong Pan; Zhang Yijia; Mi Zhongli; Du Jianchao	Men's team of five	210	208	253	201	225	201	1298	216.3	6317	6th
Zhang Peng; Yuehong Pan; Zhang Yijia; Mi Zhongli; Du Jianchao	Men's team of five	225	197	182	226	168	214	1212	202.0	6317	6th
Zhang Peng; Yuehong Pan; Zhang Yijia; Mi Zhongli; Du Jianchao	Men's team of five	254	189	189	211	174	235	1252	208.7	6317	6th
Zhang Peng; Yuehong Pan; Zhang Yijia; Mi Zhongli; Du Jianchao	Men's team of five	226	192	206	227	234	211	1296	216.0	6317	6th

All events

Athlete	Event	Singles	Doubles	Trío	Team	Total	Average	Rank
Du Jianchao	Men's all events	1257	1208	1418	1296	5179	215.79	15th
Mi Zhongli	Men's all events	1192	1234	1337	1252	5170	215.42	17th
Zhang Peng	Men's all events	1192	1414	1258	1259	5123	213.46	22nd
Zhang Yijia	Men's all events	1198	1242	1225	1212	4877	203.21	55th
Yuehong Pan	Men's all events	1174	1204	1142	1298	4818	200.75	62nd

Masters

Athlete	Event	Block 1 (Games 1–8)								Block 2 (Games 1–8)								Grand Total	Average	Rank	Stepladder 2nd–3rd place	Stepladder 1st–2nd place
Athlete	Event	1	2	3	4	5	6	7	8	1	2	3	4	5	6	7	8	Grand Total	Average	Rank	Opposition Score	Opposition Score
Du Jianchao	Men's masters	209; 10	235; 10	213; 10	171; 0	247; 10	196; 0	278; 10	229; 10	263; 10	258; 10	247; 10	213; 10	173; 0	223; 10	264; 10	191; 0	3730	225.6	2nd	Mohammad Al-Regeebah (KUW); L 208–215 (bronze)	
Mi Zhongli	Men's masters	197; 0	232; 5	219; 10	201; 0	226; 10	192; 10	178; 0	192; 10	171; 0	234; 10	217; 10	200; 10	225; 0	218; 0	269; 10	198; 0	3454	210.6	9th		

=== Women ===
Athlete	Event	Games 1–6						Total	Average	Grand Total	Rank
Athlete	Event	1	2	3	4	5	6	Total	Average	Grand Total	Rank
Chen Dongdong	Women's singles	179	195	218	196	204	227	1219	203.2		12th
Xu Lang	Women's singles	204	196	188	199	215	147	1149	191.5		31st
Jiang Wei	Women's singles	167	179	182	195	197	187	1108	184.7		42nd
Sun Hongdou	Women's singles	210	175	211	152	160	193	1101	183.5		44th
Yang Suiling	Women's singles	185	190	195	198	223	176	1167	194.5		22nd
Zhang Yuhong	Women's singles	178	215	192	179	179	213	1156	192.7		27th
Sun Hongdou; Jiang Wei	Women's doubles	170	236	199	207	176	165	1153	192.2	2261	26th
Sun Hongdou; Jiang Wei	Women's doubles	193	170	194	189	183	179	1108	184.7	2261	26th
Zhang Yuhong; Yang Suiling	Women's doubles	200	248	245	195	202	234	1324	220.7	2593	3rd place, bronze medalist(s)
Zhang Yuhong; Yang Suiling	Women's doubles	227	229	211	193	213	196	1269	211.5	2593	3rd place, bronze medalist(s)
Chen Dongdong; Xu Lang	Women's doubles	196	166	216	217	221	193	1209	201.5	2401	16th
Chen Dongdong; Xu Lang	Women's doubles	207	187	242	178	171	207	1192	198.7	2401	16th
Zhang Yuhong; Yang Suiling; Chen Dongdong	Women's trios	268	225	168	192	234	214	1301	216.8	3841	3rd place, bronze medalist(s)
Zhang Yuhong; Yang Suiling; Chen Dongdong	Women's trios	215	226	210	218	225	193	1287	214.5	3841	3rd place, bronze medalist(s)
Zhang Yuhong; Yang Suiling; Chen Dongdong	Women's trios	226	234	203	199	179	212	1253	208.8	3841	3rd place, bronze medalist(s)
Sun Hongdou; Jiang Wei; Xu Lang	Women's trios	168	211	190	213	176	171	1129	188.2	3413	16th
Sun Hongdou; Jiang Wei; Xu Lang	Women's trios	190	192	197	195	168	222	1164	194.0	3413	16th
Sun Hongdou; Jiang Wei; Xu Lang	Women's trios	175	245	181	188	168	163	1120	186.7	3413	16th
Zhang Yuhong; Yang Suiling; Chen Dongdong; Sun Hongdou; Xu Lang	Women's team of five	213	254	201	248	227	207	1350	225.0	6111	5th
Zhang Yuhong; Yang Suiling; Chen Dongdong; Sun Hongdou; Xu Lang	Women's team of five	190	223	155	204	235	199	1206	201.0	6111	5th
Zhang Yuhong; Yang Suiling; Chen Dongdong; Sun Hongdou; Xu Lang	Women's team of five	153	235	222	214	198	228	1250	208.3	6111	5th
Zhang Yuhong; Yang Suiling; Chen Dongdong; Sun Hongdou; Xu Lang	Women's team of five	200	179	200	217	177	186	1159	193.2	6111	5th
Zhang Yuhong; Yang Suiling; Chen Dongdong; Sun Hongdou; Xu Lang	Women's team of five	177	171	231	198	193	176	1146	191.0	6111	5th
Jiang Wei	Women's team of five booster	194	213	182	189	191	181	1150	191.7		

All events

Athlete	Event	Singles	Doubles	Trío	Team	Total	Average	Rank
Zhang Yuhong	Women's all events	1156	1324	1301	1350	5131	213.79	3rd place, bronze medalist(s)
Chen Dongdong	Women's all events	1219	1209	1253	1250	4931	205.46	18th
Yang Suiling	Women's all events	1167	1269	1287	1206	4929	205.38	19th
Xu Lang	Women's all events	1149	1192	1120	1146	4607	191.96	42nd
Sun Hongdou	Women's all events	1101	1153	1129	1159	4542	189.25	47th
Jiang Wei	Women's all events	1108	1108	1164	1150	4530	188.75	49th

Masters

Athlete	Event	Block 1 (Games 1–8)								Block 2 (Games 1–8)								Grand Total	Average	Rank	Stepladder 2nd–3rd place	Stepladder 1st–2nd place
Athlete	Event	1	2	3	4	5	6	7	8	1	2	3	4	5	6	7	8	Grand Total	Average	Rank	Opposition Score	Opposition Score
Chen Dongdong	Women's masters	216; 10	206; 0	170; 0	236; 10	187; 0	204; 10	279; 10	193; 0	201; 10	211; 10	203; 10	214; 10	191; 10	213; 10	201; 0	188; 0	3414	207.1	6th		
Zhang Yuhong	Women's masters	198; 0	237; 10	202; 0	185; 0	222; 10	175; 0	201; 0	212; 10	172; 0	214; 0	195; 10	180; 10	187; 0	245; 0	215; 10	187; 0	3311	201.9	10th		

== Boxing ==
Athlete	Event	Round of 32	Round of 16	Quarterfinals	Semifinals	Final	
Athlete	Event	Opposition Result	Opposition Result	Opposition Result	Opposition Result	Opposition Result	Rank
Zou Shiming	Men's Light flyweight	Bye	Latipov (UZB); W 9–2	Phoilevy (LAO); W 13–1	Ruenroeng (THA); W 5–2	Zhakypov (KAZ); W 9–5	1st place, gold medalist(s)
Chang Yong	Men's Flyweight	Bye	Yomudov (TKM); W 14–0	Pak (PRK); W 9–5	Singh (IND); W 6–5	Saludar (PHI); L 11–13	2nd place, silver medalist(s)
Zhang Jiawei	Men's Bantamweight	Bye	Yunusov (TJK); W 6–3	Shayimov (UZB); W 5–2	Ri (PRK); W RSC	Petchkoom (THA); L 3–8	2nd place, silver medalist(s)
Hu Qing	Men's Lightweight	Bye	Jony (BAN); W 9–0	Otgondalai (MGL); W 6–2	Han (KOR); W 10–7	Yadav (IND); L 4–5	2nd place, silver medalist(s)
Hulichabilige	Men's Light welterweight	Sakenov (KGZ); L 1–3	did not advance				
Maimaitituersun Qiong	Men's Welterweight	Bye	Jun (KOR); W 16–6	Sepahvand (IRI); W 13–6	Rahmonov (UZB); L 10–14	Did not advance	3rd place, bronze medalist(s)
Zhang Jianting	Men's Middleweight	Bye	Atoev (UZB); L 7–8	did not advance			
Meng Fanlong	Men's Light heavyweight		Erdenebayar (MGL); W 10–0	Borbashev (KGZ); W 24–4	Rasulov (UZB); L 1–12	Did not advance	3rd place, bronze medalist(s)
Zaifula Maimaiti	Men's Heavyweight		Bye	Singh (IND); L 4–6	did not advance		
Zhang Zhilei	Men's Super heavyweight		Iderbat (MGL); W RSC	Ghossoun (SYR); W 5–3	Samota (IND); W RSC	Dychko (KAZ); W 7–5	1st place, gold medalist(s)
Ren Cancan	Women's Flyweight		Jang (KOR); W 8–1	Lama (NEP); W 10–0	Kom (IND); W 11–7	Albania (PHI); W 7–5	1st place, gold medalist(s)
Dong Cheng	Women's Lightweight		Park (KOR); W RSC	Filisteeva (KGZ); W 18–0	Yun (PRK); W 7–2	Thongjan (THA); W 13–4	1st place, gold medalist(s)
Li Jinzi	Women's Middleweight			Seesondee (THA); W 10–2	Goyat (IND); W 5–1	Undram (MGL); W RSC	1st place, gold medalist(s)

== Canoeing ==
=== Canoe-Kayak Flatwater ===
Men

Athlete	Event	Heats		Semifinals		Final	
Athlete	Event	Time	Rank	Time	Rank	Time	Rank
Li Qiang	C-1 200 m	41.167	1	auto advancement		39.603	1st place, gold medalist(s)
Xie Weiyong	C-1 1000 m	4:16.300	3	auto advancement		3:56.081	3rd place, bronze medalist(s)
Huang Maoxing; Xie Weiyong	C-2 1000 m					3:34.289	2nd place, silver medalist(s)
Zhou Peng	K-1 200 m	37.435	1	auto advancement		36.938	2nd place, silver medalist(s)
Pan Yao	K-1 1000 m	3:46.709	3	auto advancement		3:38.160	2nd place, silver medalist(s)
Hu Yonglin; Wang Lei	K-2 200 m	34.720	1	auto advancement		33.466	3rd place, bronze medalist(s)
Huang Zhipeng; Xu Haitao	K-2 1000 m	3:18.242	1	auto advancement		3:14.699	1st place, gold medalist(s)
Huang Zhipeng; Pan Yao; Xu Haitao; Zhang Fusheng	K-4 1000 m	3:00.505	2	auto advancement		3:02.146	4

Women

Athlete	Event	Heats		Semifinals		Final	
Athlete	Event	Time	Rank	Time	Rank	Time	Rank
Zhou Yu	K-1 200 m	42.054	1	auto advancement		41.229	2nd place, silver medalist(s)
Zhou Yu	K-1 500 m	1:50.306	1	auto advancement		1:48.912	1st place, gold medalist(s)
Wang Feng; Yu Lamei	K-2 500 m	1:45.533	1	auto advancement		1:42.993	1st place, gold medalist(s)
Wang Feng; Yu Lamei; Ren Wenjun; Wu Yanan	K-4 500 m					1:34.440	1st place, gold medalist(s)

=== Canoe-Kayak Slalom ===
Men

Athlete	Event	Preliminary				Semifinal		Final	
Athlete	Event	Run 1	Run 2	Total	Rank	Time	Rank	Time	Rank
Teng Zhiqiang	C-1	90.90	91.47	182.37	1	96.50	1	92.53	1st place, gold medalist(s)
Chen Fangjia	C-1	91.94	100.36	192.30	3	102.42	3	99.92	3rd place, bronze medalist(s)
Hu Minghai; Shu Junrong	C-2	99.96	96.56	196.52	1	107.10	1	99.96	1st place, gold medalist(s)
Chen Fei; Shan Bao	C-2	106.41	103.13	209.54	2	117.89	3	113.58	2nd place, silver medalist(s)
Huang Cunguang	K-1	86.36	90.27	176.63	1	91.32	1	88.15	1st place, gold medalist(s)
Xian Jinbin	K-1	92.26	92.60	184.86	3	95.30	3	90.57	3rd place, bronze medalist(s)

Women

Athlete	Event	Preliminary				Semifinal		Final	
Athlete	Event	Run 1	Run 2	Total	Rank	Time	Rank	Time	Rank
Zou Yingying	K-1	101.04	99.38	200.42	2	105.87	1	105.72	1st place, gold medalist(s)
Li Jingjing	K-1	99.53	105.04	204.57	3	109.71	2	106.37	2nd place, silver medalist(s)

== Cricket ==
=== Men ===
Team

Hou Sifeng
Jiang Shuyao
Li Jian
Song Yangyang
Sun Duo
Wang Dianyi
Wang Jing
Wang Lei
Wang Xin
Zhang Peng
Zhang Qirui
Zhang Xinliang
Zhang Yufei
Zhao Gaosheng

Group round

- Best 4 teams (three of the four ICC Full Members in Asia, Bangladesh, Pakistan and Sri Lanka as well as Afghanistan who played in the 2010 ICC World Twenty20) directly entered the quarterfinals.

Pool C

Team	Pld	W	D	L	NRR	Pts
Malaysia	1	1	0	0	+4.450	2
China	1	0	0	1	−4.450	0

November 21
9:30
Scorecard

Malaysia; 162/8 (20 overs)	v	China; 73/8 (20 overs)
Rakesh Madhavan 68 (58); Li Jian 3/8 (1 over)		Song Yangyang 20 (28); Manrick Singh 2/10 (3 overs)

Malaysia won by 89 runs
Guanggong Cricket Stadium, Guangzhou
Umpires: Sarika Prasad (SIN) and Buddhi Pradhan (NEP)

- China won the toss and elected to field.

Quarterfinals

November 22
9:30
Scorecard

Pakistan; 183/1 (20 overs)	v	China; 55/9 (20 overs)
Khalid Latif 103* (69); Zhang Yufei 1/31 (4 overs)		Li Jian 14 (23); Raza Hasan 3/10 (4 overs)

Pakistan won by 128 runs
Guanggong Cricket Stadium, Guangzhou
Umpires: Buddhi Pradhan (NEP) and Narayanan Sivan (MAS)

- Pakistan won the toss and elected to bat.

=== Women ===
Team

Dai Shengnan
Huang Zhuo
Mei Chunhua
Su Huan
Sun Mengyao
Wang Meng
Wu Juan
Yang Yuxuan
Yu Miao
Zhang Jingjing
Zhang Mei
Zhong Duan
Zhou Haijie
Zou Miao

Group round

Pool A

November 13
9:30
scorecard

China; 116/6 (20 overs)	v	Malaysia; 61/8 (20 overs)
Sun Huan 47 (49); Rewina Mohammad 3/21 (4 overs)		Siti Mazila Hanafi 15* (16); Mei Chunhua 3/8 (4 overs)

China won by 55 runs
Guanggong Cricket Stadium, Guangzhou
Umpires: Buddhi Pradhan (NEP) and Sarika Prasad (SIN)

- China won the toss and elected to bat.

November 17
9:30
scorecard

China; 93/6 (20 overs)	v	Thailand; 92/6 (20 overs)
Sun Huan 37 (47); Natthakan Chantam 2/11 (4 overs)		Pundarika Prathanmitr 46 (53); Yu Miao 2/10 (2 overs)

China won by 1 run
Guanggong Cricket Stadium, Guangzhou
Umpires: Mosur Ramesh (SIN) and Narayanan Sivan (MAS)

- China won the toss and elected to bat.

November 17
9:30
scorecard

China; 93/6 (20 overs)	v	Thailand; 92/6 (20 overs)
Sun Huan 37 (47); Natthakan Chantam 2/11 (4 overs)		Pundarika Prathanmitr 46 (53); Yu Miao 2/10 (2 overs)

China won by 1 run
Guanggong Cricket Stadium, Guangzhou
Umpires: Mosur Ramesh (SIN) and Narayanan Sivan (MAS)

- China won the toss and elected to bat.

Semifinals

November 18
9:30
scorecard

Bangladesh; 35/1 (6.5 overs)	v	China; 34 all out (15.5 overs)
Farzana Hoque Pinky 20* (19); Zhou Haijie 1/16 (2.5 overs)		Sun Mengyao 10 (33); Salma Khatun 3/4 (3 overs)

Bangladesh won by 9 wickets
Guanggong Cricket Stadium, Guangzhou
Umpires: Sarika Prasad (SIN) and Mosur Ramesh (SIN)

- Bangladesh won the toss and elected to field.

Bronze medal match

November 19
9:30
scorecard

China; 65/6 (20 overs)	v	Japan; 66/3 (19.1 overs)
Zhang Mei 26 (42); Ota Kurumi 2/8 (4 overs)		Ema Kuribayashi 24* (55); Mei Chunhua 1/3 (4 overs)

Japan won by 7 wickets
Guanggong Cricket Stadium, Guangzhou
Umpires: Viswanathan Kalidas (MAS), Narayanan Sivan (MAS)

- Japan won the toss and elected to field.

== Cue Sports ==
Athlete	Event	Round of 64	Round of 32	Round of 16	Quarterfinals	Semifinals	Final	
Athlete	Event	Opposition Result	Opposition Result	Opposition Result	Opposition Result	Opposition Result	Opposition Result	Rank
Li Hewen	Men's Eight-ball singles	Al-Hazmi (KSA); W 7–0	Kamihashi (JPN); L 4–7	did not advance				
Liu Haitao	Men's Eight-ball singles	Shareef (MDV); W 7–1	Tanaka (JPN); W 7–3	Yang (INA); L 5–7	did not advance			
Fu Jianbo	Men's Nine-ball singles	Quader (BAN); W 9–1	Kwok (HKG); W 9–3	Al-Binali (QAT); W 9–5	Jeong (KOR); L 6–9	did not advance		
Dang Jinhu	Men's Nine-ball singles	Bye	Luong (VIE); W 9–4	Al-Yousef (KUW); W 9–7	Kiamco (PHI); L 8–9	did not advance		
Ding Junhui	Men's Snooker singles	Bye	Lee (TPE); W 4–0	Advani (IND); W 4–1	Fung (HKG); W 4–0	Poomjaeng (THA); W 4–3	Fu (HKG); L 2–4	2nd place, silver medalist(s)
Liang Wenbo	Men's Snooker singles	Bye	Al-Kojah (SYR); W 4–1	Aseeri (KSA); W 4–0	Fu (HKG); L 1–4	did not advance		
Ding Junhui; Liang Wenbo; Tian Pengfei	Men's Snooker team		Bye	United Arab Emirates; W 3–0	Qatar; W 3–0	Thailand; W 3–2	India; W 3–1	1st place, gold medalist(s)
Liu Shasha	Women's Eight-ball singles		Bye	Hoe (SIN); W 5–0	Cha (KOR); W 5–4	Chang (TPE); W 5–3	Kim (KOR); W 5–4	1st place, gold medalist(s)
Fu Xiaofang	Women's Eight-ball singles		Bye	Kajitani (JPN); L 3–5	did not advance			
Fu Xiaofang	Women's Nine-ball singles		Bye	Kajitani (JPN); W 7–3	Ranola (PHI); W 7–0	Chou (TPE); L 6–7	Did not advance	3rd place, bronze medalist(s)
Pan Xiaoting	Women's Nine-ball singles		Hoe (SIN); W 7–2	Amit (PHI); W 7–6	Cha (KOR); W 7–6	Lin (TPE); W 7–3	Chou (TPE); W 7–5	1st place, gold medalist(s)
Chen Siming	Women's Six-red snooker singles		Bye	Pillai (IND); W 4–1	Chan (TPE); W 4–1	Ng (HKG); W 4–3	Lai (TPE); W 4–0	1st place, gold medalist(s)
Bi Zhuqing	Women's Six-red snooker singles		Bye	Hoe (SIN); W 4–1	Cha (KOR); W 4–1	Lai (TPE); L 0–4	Did not advance	3rd place, bronze medalist(s)
Chen Xue; Bi Zhuqing; Chen Siming	Women's Six-red snooker team			Bye	Philippines; W 3–0	Thailand; W 3–1	Hong Kong; L 1–3	2nd place, silver medalist(s)

== Cycling ==
=== BMX ===
Men

Athlete	Event	Qualifying				Final	
Athlete	Event	Run 1	Run 2	Run 3	Rank	Time	Rank
Zhu Yan	Individual	32.868	32.062	31.908	3	32.467	4
Zhao Zhiyang	Individual	35.054	36.030	33.762	3	33.125	6

Women

Athlete	Event	Qualifying				Final	
Athlete	Event	Run 1	Run 2	Run 3	Rank	Time	Rank
Ma Liyun	Individual	38.651	37.131	37.295	1	36.662	1st place, gold medalist(s)
Yue Cong	Individual	53.471	38.833	38.427	3	37.916	3rd place, bronze medalist(s)

=== Mountain Bike ===
Men

Athlete	Event	Time	Rank
Duan Zhiqiang	Cross-country	2:14:06	3rd place, bronze medalist(s)
Wang Zhen	Cross-country	Did not finish	

Women

Athlete	Event	Time	Rank
Ren Chengyuan	Cross-country	1:46:35	1st place, gold medalist(s)
Shi Qinglan	Cross-country	1:53:07	2nd place, silver medalist(s)

=== Road ===
Men

Athlete	Event	Time	Rank
Zou Rongxi	Road race	4:14:54	3rd place, bronze medalist(s)
Ji Xitao	Road race	4:14:54	17
Ji Xitao	Time trial	1:12:25.83	10

Women

Athlete	Event	Time	Rank
Zhao Na	Road race	2:47:46	3rd place, bronze medalist(s)
Gao Min	Road race	2:47:46	17
Jiang Fan	Time trial	50:04.62	2nd place, silver medalist(s)

=== Track ===
Sprints

Athlete	Event	Qualifying		1/16 Finals (Repechage)	1/8 Finals (Repechage)	Quarterfinals	Semifinals	Finals/ Classification races	
Athlete	Event	Time Speed	Rank	Opposition Time	Opposition Time	Opposition Time	Opposition Time	Opposition Time	Rank
Zhang Lei	Men's sprint	10.140	1	Al-Bardiny (QAT); WO	Shambih (UAE); W 10.812	Feng (CHN); W 10.889, W 11.446	Nitta (JPN); W 10.882, W 10.759	Kitatsuru (JPN); W 11.127, W 10.921	1st place, gold medalist(s)
Feng Yong	Men's sprint	10.366	5	Prince (IND); W 12.096	Choi (KOR); L Rep: Son (KOR); Hsiao (TPE); W 11.133	Zhang (CHN); L, L	Did not advance	5th–8th: Varposhti (IRI); Choi (KOR); Farsinejadian (IRI); L	8
Guo Shuang	Women's sprint	10.958	1		Srichaum (THA); W 12.107	Meng (HKG); W 12.101, W 11.904	Kim (KOR); W 12.072, W 12.020	Liu (CHN); W 11.412, W 11.719	1st place, gold medalist(s)
Lin Junhong	Women's sprint	11.100	2		Maeda (JPN); W 11.920	Lee (KOR); W 12.061, W 12.577	Lee (HKG); W 11.794, W 12.029	Guo (CHN); L, L	2nd place, silver medalist(s)
Zhang Lei; Zhang Miao; Cheng Changsong	Men's team sprint	44.406	1					Japan; W 44.429	1st place, gold medalist(s)

Pursuits

Athlete	Event	Qualifying		1st round		Finals	
Athlete	Event	Time	Rank	Opposition Time	Rank	Opposition Time	Rank
Li Wei	Men's individual pursuit	4:32.336	3	Tuychiev (UZB); 4:32.505	3	Haghi (IRI); 4:37.458	3rd place, bronze medalist(s)
Wang Mingwei	Men's individual pursuit	4:35.987	7	Cheung (HKG); Overlapped	-	did not advance	
Jiang Fan	Women's individual pursuit	3:37.497	1	Nontasin (THA); 3:37.105	1	Lee (KOR); 3:38.768	1st place, gold medalist(s)
Wu Chaomei	Women's individual pursuit	3:46.282	4	I (TPE); 3:44.123	3	Na (KOR); 3:46.281	3rd place, bronze medalist(s)
Jiang Xiao; Li Wei; Wang Mingwei; Wang Jie	Men's team pursuit	4:15.653	3	Japan; 4:09.832	3	Iran; 4:11.349	3rd place, bronze medalist(s)

Keirin

Athlete	Event	1st round	Repechage	2nd round	Finals
Athlete	Event	Rank	Rank	Rank	Rank
Zhang Miao	Men's keirin	1	N/A	1	3rd place, bronze medalist(s)
Zhang Lei	Men's keirin	1	N/A	3	5

time trial

Athlete	Event	Time	Rank
Guo Shuang	Women's 500 m time trial	34.152	2nd place, silver medalist(s)

Points races

Athlete	Event	Qualifying		Final	
Athlete	Event	Points	Rank	Points	Rank
Li Wei	Men's points race	8	9	Did not finish	
Xu Gang	Men's points race	10	2	2	13
Liu Xin	Women's points race			34	1st place, gold medalist(s)
Tang Kerong	Women's points race			Did not finish	

== Dance Sports ==
Standard

Athlete	Event	Quarterfinal		Semifinal		Final	
Athlete	Event	Points	Rank	Points	Rank	Points	Rank
Shen Hong; Liang Yujie	Waltz	9.00	1	9.00	1	43.14	1st place, gold medalist(s)
Shen Hong; Liang Yujie	Tango	9.00	1	9.00	1	42.00	1st place, gold medalist(s)
Wu Zhian; Lei Ying	Slow Foxtrot	9.00	1	9.00	1	41.64	1st place, gold medalist(s)
Yang Chao; Tan Yiling	Quickstep	9.00	1	9.00	1	43.50	1st place, gold medalist(s)
Yang Chao; Tan Yiling	Five Dances Competition			45.00	1	216.07	1st place, gold medalist(s)

Latin

Athlete	Event	Quarterfinal		Semifinal		Final	
Athlete	Event	Points	Rank	Points	Rank	Points	Rank
Wang Wei; Chen Jin	Samba	9.00	1	9.00	1	40.71	1st place, gold medalist(s)
Wang Wei; Chen Jin	Paso Doble	9.00	1	9.00	1	41.71	1st place, gold medalist(s)
Fan Wenbo; Chen Shiyao	Jive	9.00	1	8.00	2	40.43	1st place, gold medalist(s)
Shi Lei; Zhang Baiyu	Cha-cha-cha	9.00	1	9.00	1	42.29	1st place, gold medalist(s)
Shi Lei; Zhang Baiyu	Five Dances Competition	45.00	1	45.00	1	216.93	1st place, gold medalist(s)

== Dragon boat ==
Men

Team	Event	Heat		Repechage		Final	
Team	Event	Time	Rank	Time	Rank	Time	Rank
China	250 m	50.996	1	auto advancement		49.467	3rd place, bronze medalist(s)
China	500 m	1:44.053	1	auto advancement		1:46.480	3rd place, bronze medalist(s)
China	1000 m	3:47.628	4	3:40.842	1	3:38.448	4

Women

Team	Event	Heat		Repechage		Final	
Team	Event	Time	Rank	Time	Rank	Time	Rank
China	250 m	1:00.255	2	1:01.235	1	59.320	1st place, gold medalist(s)
China	500 m	2:00.430	1	auto advancement		2:00.667	1st place, gold medalist(s)
China	1000 m	4:06.375	1	auto advancement		4:03.706	1st place, gold medalist(s)

== Equestrian ==
=== Jumping ===
Athlete	Horse	Event	Round 1		Round 2			Individual Final					
Athlete	Horse	Event	Round 1		Round 2			Round A		Round B		Total	
Athlete	Horse	Event	Penalties	Rank	Penalties	Total	Rank	Penalties	Rank	Penalties	Rank	Penalties	Rank
Zhang Bin	Heraldo	Individual	5	20	4	9	15	8	12	12	15	20	15
Li Zhenqiang	Thunder	Individual	2	15	13	15	23	5	11	32	17	37	17
Chen Jingchuan	Coertis	Individual	11	27	9	20	26	Did not advance					
Abai Nulahemaiti	Lauxley de Breve	Individual	EL	—	EL	EL	—	Did not advance					
China	as above	Team	18	6	26	44	6						

=== Dressage ===
Athlete	Horse	Event	Qualifier		Round A		Round B	
Athlete	Horse	Event	Score	Rank	Score	Rank	Score	Rank
Gu Bing	Donovan-Bailey	Individual	66.556	3	67.105	6	60.200	7
Huang Zhuoqin	Uris	Individual	65.833	6	65.000	7	66.650	6
Cai Qiao	Kosmopolit An	Individual	64.389	9	63.947	9	Did not advance	
Liu Lina	Cortez35	Individual	63.944	10	Did not advance			
China	as above	Team	65.593	2nd place, silver medalist(s)				

=== Eventing ===
Athlete	Horse	Event	Dressage		Cross-country			Jumping					
Athlete	Horse	Event	Dressage		Cross-country			Qualifier			Final		
Athlete	Horse	Event	Penalties	Rank	Penalties	Total	Rank	Penalties	Total	Rank	Penalties	Total	Rank
Liang Ruiji	Cervanto2	Individual	47.70	7	0	47.70	7	4	51.70	7	2	53.70	6
Yang Hua	Caro Ciaro	Individual	53.10	13	0	53.10	11	0	53.10	9	0	53.10	5
Li Jingmin	Zhendeyi	Individual	58.10	20	0	58.10	18	2	60.10	17	Did not advance		
Liu Tongyan	Siqin Tariha	Individual	60.40	23	0	60.40	19	0	60.40	18	Did not advance		
China	as above	Team	158.90	4	0	158.90	3	6	164.90	3rd place, bronze medalist(s)			

== Fencing ==
Men

Athlete	Event	Round of 32	Round of 16	Quarterfinals	Semifinals	Final	
Athlete	Event	Opposition Score	Opposition Score	Opposition Score	Opposition Score	Opposition Score	Rank
Li Guojie	Individual épée	Bye	Al-Omayri (KSA); W 15–6	Jung (KOR); W 15–14	Nishida (JPN); W 15–13	Kim (KOR); L 11–13	2nd place, silver medalist(s)
Yin Lianchi	Individual épée	Bye	Ivanov (KGZ); W 15–8	Kudaev (UZB); W 15–14	Kim (KOR); L 8–9	Did not advance	3rd place, bronze medalist(s)
Zhu Jun	Individual foil	Bye	Al-Amoodi (QAT); W 15–0	Ota (JPN); L 11–15	did not advance		
Lei Sheng	Individual foil	Bye	Abu-Assaf (JOR); W 15–6	Panchan (THA); W 15–7	Cheung (HKG); L 14–15	Did not advance	3rd place, bronze medalist(s)
Zhong Man	Individual sabre	Bye	Abdulkhedhr (KUW); W 15–4	Ogawa (JPN); W 15–7	Wang (CHN); W 15–11	Gu (KOR); L 13–15	2nd place, silver medalist(s)
Wang Jingzhi	Individual sabre	Bye	Taherkhani (IRI); W 15–6	Abedini (IRI); W 15–4	Zhong (CHN); L 11–15	Did not advance	3rd place, bronze medalist(s)
Li Guojie; Yin Lianchi; Wang Sen; Dong Chao	Team épée		Bye	Hong Kong; W 45–20	Kazakhstan; L 40–45	Did not advance	3rd place, bronze medalist(s)
Zhu Jun; Lei Sheng; Huang Liangcai; Zhang Liangliang	Team foil		Bye	Iran; W 45–22	Hong Kong; W 45–21	Japan; W 45–35	1st place, gold medalist(s)
Jiang Kelu; Liu Xiao; Wang Jingzhi; Zhong Man	Team sabre			India; W 45–21	Japan; W 45–19	South Korea; W 45–44	1st place, gold medalist(s)

Women

Athlete	Event	Round of 16	Quarterfinals	Semifinals	Final	
Athlete	Event	Opposition Score	Opposition Score	Opposition Score	Opposition Score	Rank
Xu Anqi	Individual épée	Devi (IND); W 15–7	Jung (KOR); W 15–6	Luo (CHN); L 14–15	Did not advance	3rd place, bronze medalist(s)
Luo Xiaojuan	Individual épée	Ivanov (KAZ); W 15–8	Lui (HKG); W 15–9	Xu (CHN); W 15–14	Nakano (JPN); W 13–10	1st place, gold medalist(s)
Dai Huili	Individual foil	Bye	Ng (SIN); W 9–8	Chen (CHN); L 11–14	Did not advance	3rd place, bronze medalist(s)
Chen Jinyan	Individual foil	Bye	Wang (SIN); W 15–7	Dai (CHN); W 14–11	Nam (KOR); L 3–15	2nd place, silver medalist(s)
Zhu Min	Individual sabre	Nakayama (JPN); W 15–9	Au (HKG); L 11–15	did not advance		
Tan Xue	Individual sabre	Bye	Pochekutova (KAZ); W 15–6	Au (HKG); L 8–15	Did not advance	3rd place, bronze medalist(s)
Luo Xiaojuan; Sun Yujie; Xu Anqi; Yin Mingfang	Team épée	Bye	Vietnam; W 45–25	South Korea; W 43–28	Japan; L 25–36	2nd place, silver medalist(s)
Chen Jinyan; Dai Huili; Le Huilin; Shi Yun	Team foil		India; W 45–7	Japan; L 26–28	Did not advance	3rd place, bronze medalist(s)
Bao Yingying; Chen Xiaodong; Tan Xue; Zhu Min	Team sabre		India; W 45–16	Hong Kong; W 45–29	South Korea; W 45–40	1st place, gold medalist(s)

== Field hockey ==
=== Men ===
Preliminary round

Team	Pld	W	D	L	GF	GA	GD	Pts
South Korea	4	3	1	0	25	4	+21	10
Malaysia	4	3	1	0	21	6	+15	10
China	4	2	0	2	12	7	+5	6
Oman	4	1	0	3	4	28	–24	3
Singapore	4	0	0	4	2	19	–17	0

November 15
19:30

China	7 – 0	Oman
Song Yi 13'; Liu Yixian 22' 25' 42'; De Yunze 24'; Sun Long 53'; Dong Yang 59'	Report

Aoti Hockey Field 1, Guangzhou
Umpires:
Virender Singh (IND)
John Hrytsak (CAN)

November 16
20:00

China	2 – 0	Singapore
Lu Fenghui 57'; Liu Yixian 65'	Report

Aoti Hockey Field 1, Guangzhou
Umpires:
Simon Taylor (NZL)
Thani Al-Wahabi (OMA)

November 19
20:00

China	1 – 3	South Korea
Song Yi 2'	Report	Jang Jong-Hyun 10' 27'; You Hyo-Sik 34'

Aoti Hockey Field 1, Guangzhou
Umpires:
Adam Kearns (AUS)
Raghu Prasad (IND)

November 21
19:30

Malaysia	4 – 2	China
A. Rahim 2'; Saari 18'; Hanafi 41'; Misron 66'	Report	Liu Yixian 13'; Na Yubo 36'

Aoti Hockey Field 1, Guangzhou
Umpires:
Simon Taylor (NZL)
Haider Rasool (PAK)

Classification 5th–8th

November 23
9:00

China	4 – 1	Bangladesh
Dong Yang 8'; Na Yubo 25'; Liu Yixian 26' 50'	Report	Rana 41'

Aoti Hockey Field 1, Guangzhou
Umpires:
Haider Rasool (PAK)
Raghu Prasad (IND)

Classification 5th–6th

November 25
12:00

China	2 – 0	Japan
Liu Yixian 19'; Na Yubo 65'	Report

Aoti Hockey Field 2, Guangzhou
Umpires:
Simon Taylor (NZL)
Raghu Prasad (IND)

=== Women ===
Preliminary round

Team	Pld	W	D	L	GF	GA	GD	Pts
China	6	5	1	0	31	4	+27	16
South Korea	6	5	1	0	24	5	+19	16
Japan	6	4	0	2	21	7	+14	12
India	6	3	0	3	24	6	+18	9
Malaysia	6	2	0	4	12	18	–6	6
Thailand	6	1	0	5	5	44	–39	3
Kazakhstan	6	0	0	6	3	36	–33	0

November 14
19:30

China	13 – 0	Thailand
Ma Yibo 4' 11' 43' 47'; Zhao Yudiao 7' 22'; Song Qingling 24' 50'; Gao Lihua 26'; Wang Zhishuang 28'; De Jiaojiao 32'; Xu Xiaoxu 60'; Sun Sinan 63'	Report

Aoti Hockey Field 1, Guangzhou
Umpires:
Kim Jung-Hee (KOR)
Anupama Puchimanda (IND)

November 16
15:00

China	5 – 0 Awarded	Kazakhstan
Ma Yibo 2'; Zhao Yudiao 11'; Song Qingling 19'	Report

Aoti Hockey Field 1, Guangzhou
Umpires:
Nor Piza Hassan (MAS)
Miskarmalia Mohd Ariffin (SIN)

November 17
20:00

China	6 – 0	Malaysia
Zhao Yudiao 16' 44'; Ren Ye 30'; Fu Baorong 35'; Xu Xiaoxu 55'; Ma Wei 70'	Report

Aoti Hockey Field 1, Guangzhou
Umpires:
Kim Jung-Hee (KOR)
Anupama Puchimada (IND)

November 19
15:00

China	3 – 1	Japan
Zhao Yudiao 11' 26'; Gao Lihua 14'	Report	Murakami 53'

Aoti Hockey Field 1, Guangzhou
Umpires:
Christiane Hippler (GER)
Kang Hyun-Young (KOR)

November 20
20:00

China	2 – 2	South Korea
Fu Baorong 36' 46'	Report	Park Mi-Hyun 10' 62'

Aoti Hockey Field 1, Guangzhou
Umpires:
Christiane Hippler (GER)
Mercedes Sánchez (ARG)

November 22
19:30

China	2 – 1	India
Wang Zhishuang 27'; Xu Xiaoxu 30'	Report	S. Kaur 65'

Aoti Hockey Field 1, Guangzhou
Umpires:
Kang Hyun-Young (KOR)
Lesley Nunn (RSA)

Gold medal game

November 24
17:00

China	0 – 0 (a.e.t.)	South Korea
	Report
Penalties
Ma Yibo (penalty shoot-out scored); Song Qingling (penalty shoot-out scored); Fu Baorong (penalty shoot-out scored); Zhao Yudiao (penalty shoot-out scored); Sun Sinan (penalty shoot-out scored)	5 – 4	(penalty shoot-out missed) Kim Eun-Sil; (penalty shoot-out scored) Kim Bo-Mi; (penalty shoot-out scored) Lee Seon-Ok; (penalty shoot-out scored) Kim Young-Ran; (penalty shoot-out scored) Kim Jong-Eun

Aoti Hockey Field 1, Guangzhou
Umpires:
Mercedes Sánchez (ARG)
Christiane Hippler (GER)

== Football ==
=== Men ===
Group Stage

Pos	Team	Pld	W	D	L	GF	GA	GD	Pts
1	Japan	3	3	0	0	8	0	+8	9
2	China	3	2	0	1	5	4	+1	6
3	Malaysia	3	1	0	2	2	6	−4	3
4	Kyrgyzstan	3	0	0	3	2	7	−5	0

Source: RSSSF
November 8
19:00

China	0 – 3	Japan
	Report	Yamazaki 11'; Nagai 58'; Suzuki 64'

Tianhe Stadium, Guangzhou
Referee: Valentin Kovalenko (Uzbekistan)

November 10
19:00

Kyrgyzstan	1 – 2	China
Sidorenko 5'	Report	Lu Wenjun 84'; Wu Xi 90+4'

Tianhe Stadium, Guangzhou
Referee: Ali Shaban (Kuwait)

November 13
19:00

China	3 – 0	Malaysia
Li Kai 61'; Zhao Honglue 65'; Zhang Linpeng 83' (pen.)	Report

Tianhe Stadium, Guangzhou
Referee: Ben Williams (Australia)

Round of 16

November 15
19:00

China	0 – 3	South Korea
	Report	Kim Jung-Woo 19'; Park Chu-Young 49'; Cho Young-Cheol 58'

Tianhe Stadium, Guangzhou
Referee: Saeid Mozaffabi (Iran)

=== Women ===
Group Stage

Pos	Team	Pld	W	D	L	GF	GA	GD	Pts
1	South Korea	3	2	1	0	11	1	+10	7
2	China	3	2	1	0	11	1	+10	7
3	Vietnam	3	1	0	2	4	7	−3	3
4	Jordan	3	0	0	3	1	18	−17	0

Source: RSSSF
November 14
19:00

China	10 – 1	Jordan
Ma Jun 7', 44'; Qu Shanshan 13', 17'; Xu Yuan 14', 84'; Li Lin 39', 46'; Liu Huana 54'; Pang Fengyue 90'	Report	Jbrarah 19'

University City Stadium, Guangzhou
Referee: Pannipar Kamnueng (Thailand)

November 16
19:00

China	1 – 0	Vietnam
Qu Shanshan 87'	Report

University City Stadium, Guangzhou
Referee: Ri Hyang-Ok (North Korea)

November 18
19:00

China	0 – 0	South Korea
	Report
Penalties
Zhang Yue (penalty scored); Weng Xinzhi (penalty scored); Xu Yuan (penalty scored); Pang Fengyue (penalty missed); Liu Huana (penalty scored); Yuan Fan (penalty scored); Wang Yihang (penalty scored); Zhou Gaoping (penalty scored); Qu Shanshan (penalty missed)	7 – 8	Kim Do-yeon (penalty scored); Kim Na-Rae (penalty scored); Jeon Ga-Eul (penalty scored); Yoo Ji-Eun (penalty missed); Ji So-Yun (penalty scored); Lee Eun-Mi (penalty scored); Kwon Hah-Nul (penalty scored); Hong Kyung-Suk (penalty scored); Yoo Young-A (penalty scored)

University City Stadium, Guangzhou
Referee: Sachiko Yamagishi (Japan)

Both teams ended the group stage with equal points, goal difference and goal scored. A penalty shootout was therefore taken immediately after the 90-minute match to determine the group winner in which Korea Republic won.

Semifinals

November 20
16:00

Japan	1 – 0 (a.e.t.)	China
Ohno 108'	Report

Yuexiushan Stadium, Guangzhou
Referee: Hong Eun Ah (Korea Republic)

Bronze medal match

November 22
15:30

South Korea	2 – 0	China
Park Hee-young 2'; Ji So-Yun 37'	Report

Tianhe Stadium, Guangzhou
Referee: Mai Hoang Trang (Vietnam)

== Golf ==
Men

Athlete	Event	Round 1	Round 2	Round 3	Round 4	Total	Par	Rank
Zhang Xinjun	Individual	74	70	71	79	294	+6	14
Huang Wenyi	Individual	76	74	75	74	299	+11	21
Wei Wei	Individual	80	74	72	74	300	+12	24
Liu Yuxiang	Individual	77	75	71	78	301	+13	27
China	Team	227	218	214	226	885	+21	7

Women

Athlete	Event	Round 1	Round 2	Round 3	Round 4	Total	Par	Rank
Yan Jing	Individual	69	75	74	69	287	–1	2nd place, silver medalist(s)
Li Jiayun	Individual	73	74	71	71	289	+1	4
Lin Xiyu	Individual	75	74	71	70	290	+2	7
China	Team	142	148	142	139	571	–5	2nd place, silver medalist(s)

== Gymnastics ==
=== Artistic gymnastics ===
Men
Individual Qualification & Team all-around Final

Athlete	Apparatus						Rank	Individual All-around	
Athlete	Floor	Pommel horse	Rings	Vault	Parallel bars	Horizontal bar	Rank	Total	Rank
Chen Yibing		13.700	16.200 Q	16.100		14.200	Rank	60.200	49
Feng Zhe	14.900 Q			16.400 Q	15.950 Q	15.400	Rank	62.650	48
Lu Bo	14.750	13.650	15.400	15.900	15.250	15.000	Rank	89.950	3 Q
Teng Haibin	14.700	15.550 Q	14.750	15.800	15.500 Q	15.450 Q	Rank	91.750	1 Q
Yan Mingyong		14.500 Q	15.950 Q		15.100		Rank	45.550	65
Zhang Chenglong	15.350 Q	14.450		16.050 Q	15.200	16.100 Q	Rank	77.150	29
Team totals	59.700	58.200	62.300	64.450	61.900	61.950	368.500 (gold)		

Individual

Athlete	Event	Final							
Athlete	Event	Floor	Pommel Horse	Rings	Vault	Parallel Bars	Horizontal Bar	Total	Rank
Chen Yibing	Rings			16.075				16.075	1st place, gold medalist(s)
Feng Zhe	Floor	14.900						14.900	4
Feng Zhe	Vault				15.850			15.850	2nd place, silver medalist(s)
Feng Zhe	Parallel bars					15.650		15.650	1st place, gold medalist(s)
Lu Bo	Individual all-around	14.600	14.350	15.500	15.450	15.050	14.900	89.850	2nd place, silver medalist(s)
Teng Haibin	Individual all-around	14.500	15.300	14.950	15.650	15.550	15.150	91.100	1st place, gold medalist(s)
Teng Haibin	Pommel horse		15.375					15.375	1st place, gold medalist(s)
Teng Haibin	Parallel bars					13.875		13.875	7
Teng Haibin	Horizontal bar						15.450	15.450	3rd place, bronze medalist(s)
Yan Mingyong	Pommel horse		14.725					14.725	2nd place, silver medalist(s)
Yan Mingyong	Rings			15.900				15.900	2nd place, silver medalist(s)
Zhang Chenglong	Floor	15.400						15.400	1st place, gold medalist(s)
Zhang Chenglong	Vault				15.425			15.425	6

Women
Individual Qualification & Team all-around Final

Athlete	Apparatus				Rank	Individual All-around	
Athlete	Vault	Uneven bars	Balance beam	Floor	Rank	Total	Rank
Deng Linlin	14.350		14.650 Q		Rank	29.000	32
He Kexin		16.100 Q		13.700	Rank	29.800	31
Huang Qiushuang	15.300 Q	15.850 Q	13.950	13.900 Q	Rank	59.000	1 Q
Jiang Yuyuan	14.850	14.400	13.450	13.050	Rank	55.750	5
Sui Lu	13.700	14.050	15.300 Q	14.500 Q	Rank	57.550	2 Q
Yang Yilin	14.950	14.950	13.800	13.600	Rank	57.300	3
Team totals	59.450	61.300	57.700	55.700	234.150 (gold)		

Individual

Athlete	Event	Final					
Athlete	Event	Vault	Uneven bars	Balance beam	Floor	Total	Rank
Deng Linlin	Balance beam			15.200		15.200	2nd place, silver medalist(s)
He Kexin	Uneven bars		16.425			16.425	1st place, gold medalist(s)
Huang Qiushuang	Vault	14.787				14.787	1st place, gold medalist(s)
Huang Qiushuang	Uneven bars		15.825			15.825	2nd place, silver medalist(s)
Huang Qiushuang	Floor				12.975	12.975	5
Huang Qiushuang	Individual all-around	15.150	14.150	14.250	14.500	58.050	2nd place, silver medalist(s)
Sui Lu	Balance beam			15.425		15.425	1st place, gold medalist(s)
Sui Lu	Floor				14.700	14.700	1st place, gold medalist(s)
Sui Lu	Individual all-around	14.100	14.150	15.350	14.800	58.400	1st place, gold medalist(s)

=== Rhythmic gymnastics ===
Individual Qualification & Team all-around Final

Athlete	Apparatus				Rank	Individual All-around	
Athlete	Rope	Hoop	Clubs	Ribbon	Rank	Total	Rank
Deng Senyue	26.200	24.750	26.050	25.450	Rank	77.700	6 Q
Dou Baobao	25.700	25.000	25.900	23.900	Rank	76.600	8 Q
Hou Yanan		22.950	25.050		Rank	48.000	25
Peng Linyi	24.300			23.800	Rank	48.100	24
Team totals	76.200	72.700	77.000	73.150	5		

Individual all-around

Athlete	Final					
Athlete	Rope	Hoop	Clubs	Ribbon	Total	Rank
Deng Senyue	26.450	26.150	26.600	26.150	105.350	5
Dou Baobao	25.850	25.550	26.250	25.800	103.450	6

=== Trampoline ===
Men

Athlete	Event	Qualification		Final	
Athlete	Event	Score	Rank	Score	Rank
Dong Dong	Individual	76.20	1	44.50	1st place, gold medalist(s)
Tu Xiao	Individual	75.90	2	43.80	2nd place, silver medalist(s)

Women

Athlete	Event	Qualification		Final	
Athlete	Event	Score	Rank	Score	Rank
He Wenna	Individual	71.80	1	40.90	2nd place, silver medalist(s)
Huang Shanshan	Individual	71.40	2	41.40	1st place, gold medalist(s)

== Handball ==
=== Men ===
Preliminary round

Pos	Team	Pld	W	D	L	GF	GA	GD	Pts	Qualification
1	Japan	5	4	0	1	208	123	+85	8	Semifinals
2	Saudi Arabia	5	3	1	1	192	129	+63	7 (Note: Head-to-head result: KSA 32–31 QAT.)	Semifinals
3	Qatar	5	3	1	1	185	134	+51	7	Placement 5th–6th
4	China	5	2	2	1	178	109	+69	6	Placement 7th–8th
5	India	5	1	0	4	153	194	−41	2	Placement 9th–10th
6	Mongolia	5	0	0	5	88	315	−227	0	

Source: Results
Notes:

November 13; 14:00	China	41 – 21	India	Huashi Gymnasium, Guangzhou; Referees: Al-Marzouqi, Al-Nuaimi (UAE)
November 13; 14:00	Liu W., Zhou X.J., Zhang Z.Y. 5	(19–12)	Prasad 6	Huashi Gymnasium, Guangzhou; Referees: Al-Marzouqi, Al-Nuaimi (UAE)
November 13; 14:00	2× (yellow card) 4× (suspension) 1× (red card)	Report	2× (yellow card) 5× (suspension) 1× (red card)	Huashi Gymnasium, Guangzhou; Referees: Al-Marzouqi, Al-Nuaimi (UAE)

November 14; 14:00	Saudi Arabia	23 – 23	China	Huashi Gymnasium, Guangzhou; Referees: Al-Abdullah, Hirzallah (JOR)
November 14; 14:00	Al-Mohsin 7	(10–10)	Zhu X.C. 9	Huashi Gymnasium, Guangzhou; Referees: Al-Abdullah, Hirzallah (JOR)
November 14; 14:00	2× (yellow card) 5× (suspension)	Report	2× (yellow card) 2× (suspension)	Huashi Gymnasium, Guangzhou; Referees: Al-Abdullah, Hirzallah (JOR)

November 16; 15:45	China	22 – 27	Japan	Huashi Gymnasium, Guangzhou; Referees: Al-Mutawa, Al-Suwailam (KUW)
November 16; 15:45	Tian J.X. 6	(10–12)	Toyoda 6	Huashi Gymnasium, Guangzhou; Referees: Al-Mutawa, Al-Suwailam (KUW)
November 16; 15:45	3× (yellow card) 4× (suspension)	Report	3× (yellow card) 2× (suspension)	Huashi Gymnasium, Guangzhou; Referees: Al-Mutawa, Al-Suwailam (KUW)

November 18; 15:45	China	67 – 13	Mongolia	Huashi Gymnasium, Guangzhou; Referees: Al-Mutawa, Al-Suwailam (KUW)
November 18; 15:45	Li A. 20	(34–4)	Sainkhuu 4	Huashi Gymnasium, Guangzhou; Referees: Al-Mutawa, Al-Suwailam (KUW)
November 18; 15:45	1× (yellow card) 2× (suspension)	Report	3× (yellow card) 3× (suspension)	Huashi Gymnasium, Guangzhou; Referees: Al-Mutawa, Al-Suwailam (KUW)

November 20; 17:30	Qatar	25 – 25	China	Huashi Gymnasium, Guangzhou; Referees: Al-Abdullah, Hirzallah (JOR)
November 20; 17:30	Ghazal, Al-Raeiss 5	(14–10)	Li A. 8	Huashi Gymnasium, Guangzhou; Referees: Al-Abdullah, Hirzallah (JOR)
November 20; 17:30	3× (yellow card) 4× (suspension)	Report	3× (yellow card) 4× (suspension)	Huashi Gymnasium, Guangzhou; Referees: Al-Abdullah, Hirzallah (JOR)

Placement 7th–8th

November 24; 18:00	China	33 – 30	Kuwait	Huashi Gymnasium, Guangzhou; Referees: Mousavian, Taghavi (IRI)
November 24; 18:00	Tian J.X. 8	(18–16)	Al-Zoabi 15	Huashi Gymnasium, Guangzhou; Referees: Mousavian, Taghavi (IRI)
November 24; 18:00	2× (yellow card) 6× (suspension) 1× (red card)	Report	3× (yellow card) 2× (suspension)	Huashi Gymnasium, Guangzhou; Referees: Mousavian, Taghavi (IRI)

=== Women ===
Preliminary round

Pos	Team	Pld	W	D	L	GF	GA	GD	Pts	Qualification
1	China	3	3	0	0	94	49	+45	6	Semifinals
2	Japan	3	2	0	1	82	68	+14	4	Semifinals
3	North Korea	3	1	0	2	90	74	+16	2	Placement 5th–6th
4	India	3	0	0	3	42	117	−75	0	Placement 7th–8th

Source: Results

November 18; 17:15	China	43 – 9	India	Guanggong Gymnasium, Guangzhou; Referees: Al-Mizili, Al-Mawlani (BHR)
November 18; 17:15	Wei Q.X. 10	(20–3)	Negi, Patil, Madhavi 3	Guanggong Gymnasium, Guangzhou; Referees: Al-Mizili, Al-Mawlani (BHR)
November 18; 17:15	3× (yellow card) 3× (suspension)	Report	3× (yellow card) 3× (suspension)	Guanggong Gymnasium, Guangzhou; Referees: Al-Mizili, Al-Mawlani (BHR)

November 21; 20:45	China	26 – 21	North Korea	Guanggong Gymnasium, Guangzhou; Referees: Karbaschi, Kolahdouzan (IRI)
November 21; 20:45	Wei Q.X., Sha Z.W. 6	(10–8)	Jong Y.M. 5	Guanggong Gymnasium, Guangzhou; Referees: Karbaschi, Kolahdouzan (IRI)
November 21; 20:45	3× (yellow card) 6× (suspension)	Report	4× (yellow card) 5× (suspension)	Guanggong Gymnasium, Guangzhou; Referees: Karbaschi, Kolahdouzan (IRI)

November 23; 20:45	Japan	19 – 25	China	Guanggong Gymnasium, Guangzhou; Referees: Al-Mizil, Al-Mawlani (BHR)
November 23; 20:45	Fujii 8	(6–12)	Li W.W. 6	Guanggong Gymnasium, Guangzhou; Referees: Al-Mizil, Al-Mawlani (BHR)
November 23; 20:45	3× (yellow card) 3× (suspension)	Report	2× (yellow card) 5× (suspension)	Guanggong Gymnasium, Guangzhou; Referees: Al-Mizil, Al-Mawlani (BHR)

Semifinal

November 25; 14:15	China	24 – 18	Kazakhstan	Guanggong Gymnasium, Guangzhou; Referees: Al-Marzouqi, Al-Nuaimi (UAE)
November 25; 14:15	Li W.W. 5	(11–10)	Pikalova 5	Guanggong Gymnasium, Guangzhou; Referees: Al-Marzouqi, Al-Nuaimi (UAE)
November 25; 14:15	1× (yellow card) 5× (suspension)	Report	2× (yellow card) 2× (suspension)	Guanggong Gymnasium, Guangzhou; Referees: Al-Marzouqi, Al-Nuaimi (UAE)

Gold medal match

November 26; 14:15	Japan	22 – 31	China	Guanggong Gymnasium, Guangzhou; Referees: Al-Marzouqi, Al-Nuaimi (UAE)
November 26; 14:15	Fujii 7	(13–14)	Sha Z.W. 8	Guanggong Gymnasium, Guangzhou; Referees: Al-Marzouqi, Al-Nuaimi (UAE)
November 26; 14:15	3× (yellow card) 2× (suspension)	Report	3× (yellow card) 3× (suspension)	Guanggong Gymnasium, Guangzhou; Referees: Al-Marzouqi, Al-Nuaimi (UAE)

== Judo ==
Men

Athlete	Event	Preliminary	Round of 16	Quarterfinals	Final of table	Final of repechage	Final	
Athlete	Event	Opposition Result	Opposition Result	Opposition Result	Opposition Result	Opposition Result	Opposition Result	Rank
A Lamusi	−60 kg	Bye	Al-Dheyabi (KUW); W 111–001	Choi (KOR); L 000–100	Did not advance	Chana (IND); W 101–002	Amartuvshin (MGL); W 101–000	3rd place, bronze medalist(s)
Yang Xiaoming	–66 kg	Bye	Miresmaeili (IRI); L 000–100	did not advance				
Jin Zhiwei	–73 kg	Maloumat (IRI); L 001–100	did not advance					
Si Rijigawa	–81 kg	Bye	Sheaibi (KUW); W 111–000	Uuganbaatar (MGL); L 000–001	Did not advance	Hanafi (QAT); W 101–000	Bozbayev (KAZ); L 010–100	
He Yanzhu	–90 kg	Bye	Fadel (LIB); L 002–100	did not advance				
Shao Ning	–100 kg	Bye	Al-Enezi (KUW); W 101–000	Hwang (KOR); L 000–120	Did not advance	Sayidov (UZB); L 000–120	did not advance	
Wang Hao	+100 kg		Kim (KOR); L 000–100	did not advance				
Wang Hao	Open		Krakovetskii (KGZ); W 100–000	Shah (PAK); W 100–000	Roudaki (IRI); L 000–111	Repechage not needed	Munkhbaatar (MGL); L 000–100	

Women

Athlete	Event	Preliminary	Round of 16	Quarterfinals	Final of table	Final of repechage	Final	
Athlete	Event	Opposition Result	Opposition Result	Opposition Result	Opposition Result	Opposition Result	Opposition Result	Rank
Wu Shugen	–48 kg		Filippova (TKM); W 101–000	Podryadova (KAZ); W 000–000	Chung (KOR); W 100–000	Repechage not needed	Fukumi (JPN); W 000–000	1st place, gold medalist(s)
He Hongmei	–52 kg		Adhikari (NEP); W 111–000	Berdygulova (UZB); W 121–000	Bundmaa (MGL); L 001–100	Repechage not needed	Kim (KOR); W 011–000	3rd place, bronze medalist(s)
Zhu Guirong	–57 kg	Bye	Isakova (KGZ); W 120–000	Rim (PRK); L 000–101	Did not advance	Ten (KAZ); W 101–000	Battögs (MGL); L 001–002	
Lin Meiling	–63 kg		Thongsri (THA); W 100–000	Wang (TPE); L 002–010	Did not advance	ayitbayeva (TKM); W 120–000	Kim (PRK); L 000–100	
Chen Fei	–70 kg		Bye	Naranjargal (MGL); W 101–000	Hwang (KOR); L 000–110	Repechage not needed	Watanabe (JPN); W 001–000	3rd place, bronze medalist(s)
Yang Xiuli	–78 kg			Dugaduga (PHI); W 100–000	Jeong (KOR); L 001–101	Repechage not needed	Lkhamdegd (MGL); W 100–000	3rd place, bronze medalist(s)
Qin Qian	+78 kg			Bye	Issanova (KAZ); W 100–000	Repechage not needed	Sugimoto (JPN); L 000–000	2nd place, silver medalist(s)
Liu Huanyuan	Open		Bye	Tachimoto (JPN); W 100–000	Tserenkhand (MGL); W 100–000	Repechage not needed	Kim (KOR); W 001–000	1st place, gold medalist(s)

== Karate ==
Men

Athlete	Event	1/16 Finals	1/8 Finals	Quarterfinals	Semifinals	Repechage 1	Repechage 2	Finals/ Bronze medal match	
Athlete	Event	Opposition Result	Opposition Result	Opposition Result	Opposition Result	Opposition Result	Opposition Result	Opposition Result	Rank
Dong Mingming	−60 kg	Bye	Abohableh (SYR); W 1–0	Al-Najjar (JOR); L 0–1	Did not advance	No Needed	Dharmawan (INA); L 1–7	did not advance	
Li Haojie	−67 kg	Hassani (AFG); W 4–0	Dalloul (QAT); L DQ	did not advance					
Xu Xiangwu	−84 kg	Bye	Rathi (IND); W 6–1	Umedov (TJK); W 3–1	Araga (JPN); L 1–2	No Needed		Yen (TPE); L 1–7	
Li Peng	+84 kg		Bye	Ashurov (UZB); W 0–0	Syarief (INA); L 0–3			Lei (MAC); L 0–0	

Women

Athlete	Event	1/8 Finals	Quarterfinals	Semifinals	Repechage 1	Finals/ Bronze medal match	
Athlete	Event	Opposition Result	Opposition Result	Opposition Result	Opposition Result	Opposition Result	Rank
Li Hong	−50 kg	Torrattanawathana (THA); W 1–0	Zhetibay (KAZ); W 1–0	Valentina (IND); W WD	No Needed	Vu (VIE); W 2–0	1st place, gold medalist(s)
Zeng Cuilan	−61 kg	Chang (TPE); L 0–2	did not advance				
Feng Lanlan	−68 kg	bye	Gurung (NEP); W 9–0	Liu (TPE); W 3–0	No Needed	Honma (JPN); W 3–0	1st place, gold medalist(s)
Tang Lingling	+68 kg		Kazakova (UZB); W 1–0	Shath (JOR); L 2–5		Park (KOR); W 2–1	3rd place, bronze medalist(s)

== Modern Pentathlon ==
Men

Athlete	Event	Fencing	Swimming	Riding	Combined	Total Points	Rank
Cao Zhongrong	Individual	944	1368	1188	2268	5768	1st place, gold medalist(s)
Wang Guan	Individual	944	1224	1192	2228	5588	4
Liu Yanli	Individual	804	1252	1160	2152	5368	9
Xu Yunqi	Individual	664	1332	1136	2172	5304	12
China	Team	3356	5176	4676	8820	22028	2nd place, silver medalist(s)

Women

Athlete	Event	Fencing	Swimming	Riding	Combined	Total Points	Rank
Miao Yihua	Individual	1000	1152	1200	1888	5240	1st place, gold medalist(s)
Wu Yanyan	Individual	832	960	1192	1968	4952	2nd place, silver medalist(s)
Zhang Ye	Individual	832	944	972	1980	4728	4
Chen Qian	Individual	972	1124	628	1984	4708	5
China	Team	3636	4180	3992	7820	19628	1st place, gold medalist(s)

== Roller Sports ==
=== Men ===
Athlete	Event	Qualification		Final	
Athlete	Event	Result	Rank	Result	Rank
Yuan Jianjin	Men's 300 m time trial			25.622	5th
He Xin	Men's 300 m time trial			25.770	6th
Yuan Jianjin	Men's 500 m sprint race	44.738	4th	did not advance	
He Xin	Men's 500 m sprint race	43.216	3rd	did not advance	
Cong Siyuan	Men's 10,000 m Points + Elimination			15.0	3rd place, bronze medalist(s)
Hijo Jiaming	Men's 10,000 m Points + Elimination			2.0	6th

=== Women ===
Athlete	Event	Qualification		Final	
Athlete	Event	Result	Rank	Result	Rank
Zang Yinglu	Women's 300 m time trial			26.893	2nd place, silver medalist(s)
Li Wenwen	Women's 300 m time trial			27.362	3rd place, bronze medalist(s)
Zang Yinglu	Women's 500 m sprint race	46.063	2nd Q	45.053	3rd place, bronze medalist(s)
Li Wenwen	Women's 500 m sprint race	46.464	3rd	did not advance	
Guo Dan	Women's 10,000 m Points + Elimination			20.0	2nd place, silver medalist(s)
Li Lisha	Women's 10,000 m Points + Elimination			0.0	6th

=== Artistic ===
Athlete	Event	Short Program		Long Program	
Athlete	Event	Result	Rank	Result	Rank
Zhao Zilong	Men's Free skating	79.0	4th	243.6	4th
Deng Lei	Men's Free skating	77.9	6th	222.6	7th
Dong Zhidou	Women's Free skating	76.9	2nd	245.1	2nd place, silver medalist(s)
Lin Meijiao	Women's Free skating	75.7	3rd	229.2	3rd place, bronze medalist(s)
Wang Wenxin; Seng Jinkang	Pairs's Free skating	71.9	4th	220.2	4th
Lin Yawen; Tang Yunqin	Pairs's Free skating	78.8	2nd	245.4	1st place, gold medalist(s)

== Rowing ==
Men

Athlete	Event	Heats		Repechage		Final	
Athlete	Event	Time	Rank	Time	Rank	Time	Rank
Su Hui; Zhang Liang	Double Sculls	6:23.38	1st QF	auto advancement		6:29.74	1st place, gold medalist(s)
Zhang Guolin; Sun Jie	Lightweight Double Sculls	6:27.81	1st QF	auto advancement		6:26.37	1st place, gold medalist(s)
Sun Zhaowen; Wu Lin; Li Dongjian; Liu Kun	Four	6:02.44	1st QF	auto advancement		6:06.40	1st place, gold medalist(s)
Zhang Fangbing; Zheng Xiaolong; Zhu Ziqiang; Guo Xiaobing; Zhou Yinan; Wang Xiangdang; Xue Feng; Qu Xiaoming; Zhang Dechang	Eight	5:31.81	1st QF	auto advancement		5:37.44	1st place, gold medalist(s)

Women

Athlete	Event	Heats		Repechage		Final	
Athlete	Event	Time	Rank	Time	Rank	Time	Rank
Tang Bin	Single Scull	7:43.58	1st QF	auto advancement		7:41.63	1st place, gold medalist(s)
Sun Zhengping; Lin Hong	Pairs	7:27.31	1st QF	auto advancement		7:22.06	1st place, gold medalist(s)
Tian Liang; Jin Ziwei	Double Sculls	7:10.08	1st QF	auto advancement		7:05.68	1st place, gold medalist(s)
Huang Wenyi; Pan Feinhong	Lightweight Double Sculls	7:10.25	1st QF	auto advancement		7:13.02	1st place, gold medalist(s)
Ding Yanjie; Li Xin; Ji Zhen; Liu Jiahuan	Four	6:48.62	1st QF	auto advancement		6:51.56	1st place, gold medalist(s)
Liu Tingting; Wang Xinnan; Liu Jing; Yan Shimin	LightWeight Quadruple Sculls	6:40.41	1st QF	auto advancement		6:35.64	1st place, gold medalist(s)

== Rugby ==
=== Men ===
Preliminary round

Pool B

Team	Pld	W	D	L	PF	PA	PD	Pts
China	3	3	0	0	99	10	+89	9
South Korea	3	2	0	1	91	17	+74	7
Sri Lanka	3	1	0	2	47	81	−34	5
India	3	0	0	3	17	146	−129	3

November 21
17:26

China	26 – 5	Sri Lanka
Try: Sun T. 2' c Li Y. 8' c He Z.L. 10' m Chen X.S. 13' c Con: Zhang Z.Q. (2/3); Jin Y. (1/1)		Try: Jayasinghe 6' m

University City Stadium, Guangzhou
Referee: Azhar Yusof (Singapore)

November 22
11:23

China	61 – 0	India
Try: Zhang Z.Q. 1' c Li Y. (2) 3' c, 5' c Lu Z. (4) 6' c, 8' c, 10' c, 14' c Li J.L. 7' c Sun T. 13' m Con: Zhang Z.Q. (2/2); Li Y. (1/1); Lu Z. (4/4); Jin Y. (1/1)

University City Stadium, Guangzhou
Referee: Gabriel Lee (Hong Kong)

November 22
14:32

South Korea	5 – 12	China
Try: Kwak C.W. 7' m		Try: Lu Z. 11' c Jin Y. 13' m Con: Li Y. (1/1)

University City Stadium, Guangzhou
Referee: Taizo Hirabayashi (Japan)

Quarterfinals

November 23
11:23

China	36 – 0	Thailand
Try: Xu H. 2' c Jin Y. 4' c He Z.L. 6' m Li Y. (2) 7' c, 8' m Li J.L. 14' c Con: Li Y. (1/2); Jin Y. (1/1); Xu H. (1/1)

University City Stadium, Guangzhou
Referee: Alan Whitcombe (Great Britain)

Semifinals

November 23
14:55

China	14 – 19 (a.e.t.)	Hong Kong
Try: Zhang Z.Q. 4' c Lu Z. 11' c Con: Lu Z. (1/1); Zhang Z.Q. (1/1)		Try: Varty 2' c A. Haynes (2) 7' c, 15' m Con: Robertson (2/2)

University City Stadium, Guangzhou
Referee: Taizo Hirabayashi (Japan)

Bronze medal match

November 23
17:18

South Korea	21 – 14	China
Try: Park W.Y. 2' c Chun J.M. 9' c Kim H.S. 14' c Con: Chun J.M. (2/2); Kim W.Y. (1/1)		Try: Li Y. 5' c Jin Y. 7' c Con: Zhang Z.Q. (2/2)

University City Stadium, Guangzhou
Referee: Harry Mason (Singapore)

=== Women ===
Preliminary round

Pool A

Team	Pld	W	D	L	PF	PA	PD	Pts
China	3	3	0	0	116	0	+116	9
Thailand	3	2	0	1	65	50	+15	7
Hong Kong	3	1	0	2	50	46	−4	5
South Korea	3	0	0	3	0	135	−135	3

November 21
14:30

China	51 – 0	South Korea
Try: Bai Y. (2) 1' m, 10' c Liu T.T. (2) 4' m, 11' m Liu Y. (2) 5' m, 8' m Zhao X.Q. 7' c Guan Q.S. (2) 12' m, 14' c Con: Liu T.T. (2/4); Zhao X.Q. (1/1)

University City Stadium, Guangzhou
Referee: Gabriel Lee (Hong Kong)

November 22
11:46

China	29 – 0	Hong Kong
Try: Fan W.J. (2) 1' m, 11' c Bai Y. 4' c Liu Y. 6' m Guan Q.S. 9' m Con: Liu Y. (1/3); Fan W.J. (1/1)

University City Stadium, Guangzhou
Referee: Abdul Rashid Aziz (Singapore)

November 22
15:23

China	36 – 0	Thailand
Try: Liu Y. (2) 2' m, 9' c Wang Q.L. 6' c Fan W.J. 7' m Bai Y. 10' m Wang Y. 14' c Con: Fan W.J. (2/3); Pei J.W. (1/1)

University City Stadium, Guangzhou
Referee: Scott Herbert (New Zealand)

Quarterfinals

November 23
9:00

China	42 – 0	India
Try: Guan Q.S. (2) 2' m, 8' m Bai Y. (2) 3' m, 13' m Liu T.T. 5' m Wang Q.L. 10' m Fan W.J. (2) 11' c, 14' m Con: Fan W.J. (1/1)

University City Stadium, Guangzhou
Referee: Anthony Lothian (Hong Kong)

Semifinals

November 23
12:55

China	34 – 0	Hong Kong
Try: Bai Y. (2) 3' m, 10' m Fan W.J. (3) 5' c, 6' m, 8' c Guan Q.S. 12' m Con: Fan W.J. (2/2)

University City Stadium, Guangzhou
Referee: Harry Mason (Singapore)

Gold medal match

November 23
17:48

China	14 – 17	Kazakhstan
Try: Wang Q.L. 6' c Gao Y. 15' c Con: Fan W.J. (1/1); Gao Y. (1/1)		Try: Amossova 4' m Sherer 13' c Yakovleva 15' m Con: Radzivil (1/3)

University City Stadium, Guangzhou
Referee: Gabriel Lee (Hong Kong)

== Sailing ==
=== Men ===
Athlete	Event	Race												Net Points	Final Rank
Athlete	Event	1	2	3	4	5	6	7	8	9	10	11	12	Net Points	Final Rank
Yao Fuwen	Mistral One Design Class	3	1	3	1	1	3	2	(4)	3	2	3	4	26.0	3rd place, bronze medalist(s)
Wang Aichen	RS:X	1	(5)	1	1	2	1	1	1	1	2	1	1	13.0	1st place, gold medalist(s)
Zhang Xiaotian	Optimist (dinghy)	4	1	3	1	6	(9)	1	1	1	1	3	5	27.0	1st place, gold medalist(s)
Chen Huichao	Laser (dinghy)	3	4	3	3	4	1	1	4	1	2	1	(8); DSQ	27.0	3rd place, bronze medalist(s)
Ding Mingcheng; Liu Zhen	Double Handed Dinghy 420	3	5	(8)	7	4	5	6	7	2	6	6	6	57.0	6th
Wang Weidong; Deng Daokun	Double Handed Dinghy 470	2	2	1	1	(6)	5	3	1	6	1	1	1	24.0	2nd place, silver medalist(s)

=== Women ===
Athlete	Event	Race												Net Points	Final Rank
Athlete	Event	1	2	3	4	5	6	7	8	9	10	11	12	Net Points	Final Rank
Wang Ning	Mistral One Design Class	2	1	1	1	1	1	1	(6); RAF	1	1	1	2	13	1st place, gold medalist(s)
Sun Sasa	RS:X	1	1	1	1	(2)	1	1	1	1	2	1	2	13.0	1st place, gold medalist(s)
Lu Yuting	Optimist (dinghy)	1	2	3	2	(6)	1	2	1	3	4	2	10; DNE	31.0	3rd place, bronze medalist(s)
Wei Mengxi; Gao Haiyan	Double Handed Dinghy 420	(4)	3	3	3	2	2	3	4	3	1	4	4	32.0	3rd place, bronze medalist(s)
Cai Liping; Gao Yang	Double Handed Dinghy 470	2	2	2	2	(3)	3	2	2	2	2	2	1	22.0	2nd place, silver medalist(s)

=== Open ===
Athlete	Event	Race												Net Points	Final Rank
Athlete	Event	1	2	3	4	5	6	7	8	9	10	11	12	Net Points	Final Rank
Zhang Dongshuang	Laser Radial	1	(10)	8	9	1	1	8	9	1	4	10	10	62.0	7th
Wu Wutang; Liu Ming	Hobie-16	3	(8); DSQ	8 DNF	5	5	7	2	1	5	4	5	2	47.0	4th

Athlete	Event	Opposition	Opposition	Opposition	Opposition	Opposition	Opposition	Opposition	Total Points	Rank	Semifinal	Final	Final Rank
Athlete	Event	1st + 2nd Race Points	1st + 2nd Race Points	1st + 2nd Race Points	1st + 2nd Race Points	1st + 2nd Race Points	1st + 2nd Race Points	1st + 2nd Race Points	Total Points	Rank	Races Points	Races Points	Final Rank
Wang Ru; Ni Xiaowen; Li Xiaoni; Pan Tingting; Zhou Jing	Open Match Racing	Bahrain (BRN); 2–0	Japan (JPN); 1–1	Pakistan (PAK); 2–0	India (IND); 1–1	South Korea (KOR); 1–1	Singapore (SIN); 1–1	Malaysia (MAS); 0–1	9	2nd	India (IND); 2–3	Bronze medal races: South Korea (KOR); 1–3	4th

== Sepaktakraw ==
=== Men's double regu ===
Team

Xu Mingchi
Yang Jiapeng
Zhou Haiyang

Preliminary

Group B

Pos	Team	Pld	W	L	SF	SA	SD	Pts	Qualification
1	Indonesia	3	3	0	6	0	+6	6	Semifinals
2	Japan	3	2	1	4	3	+1	4	Semifinals
3	China	3	1	2	2	5	−3	2	
4	India	3	0	3	2	6	−4	0	

Source: Results

Date		Score		Set 1	Set 2	Set 3
25 Nov	Indonesia	2–0	China	21–17	21–13	
25 Nov	China	0–2	Japan	22–24	14–21	
26 Nov	India	1–2	China	21–17	24–25	10–15

=== Men's regu ===
Team

Xu Mingchi
Ge Yusheng
Zhou Haiyang
Yang Jiapeng
Zhang Linye All times are China Standard Time (UTC+08:00)

Pos	Team	Pld	W	L	SF	SA	SD	Pts
1	Thailand	3	3	0	6	1	+5	6
2	Malaysia	3	2	1	4	2	+2	4
3	Myanmar	3	1	2	3	4	−1	2
4	China	3	0	3	0	6	−6	0

Source: Results

Date		Score		Set 1	Set 2	Set 3
22 Nov	China	0–2	Thailand	10–21	11–21	
22 Nov	Malaysia	2–0	China	21–13	21–10	
23 Nov	Myanmar	2–0	China	21–16	21–12	

=== Men's team ===
Team

Xu Mingchi
Ge Yusheng
Zhou Haiyang
Yang Jiapeng
Zhang Linye
Ding Yuting
Jin Jie
Li Huanhuan
Wang Gang
Wang Jian

Preliminary

Group B

Pos	Team	Pld	W	L	MF	MA	MD	Pts	Qualification
1	Malaysia	3	3	0	8	1	+7	6	Semifinals
2	Japan	3	2	1	5	4	+1	4	Semifinals
3	China	3	1	2	3	6	−3	2	
4	India	3	0	3	2	7	−5	0	

Source: Results

Date		Score		Regu 1	Regu 2	Regu 3
16 Nov	Malaysia	2–1	China	2–0	1–2	2–0
17 Nov	China	2–1	India	2–1	0–2	2–0
18 Nov	Japan	3–0	China	2–1	2–0	2–1

=== Women's double regu ===
Team

Cui Yonghui
Sun Xiaodan
Wang Xiaohua

Preliminary

Group A

Pos	Team	Pld	W	L	SF	SA	SD	Pts	Qualification
1	Myanmar	2	2	0	4	1	+3	4	Semifinals
2	China	2	1	1	3	2	+1	2	Semifinals
3	India	2	0	2	0	4	−4	0	

Source: Results

Date		Score		Set 1	Set 2	Set 3
25 Nov	India	0–2	China	7–21	12–21	
26 Nov	Myanmar	2–1	China	23–21	15–21	16–14

Semifinal

Date		Score		Set 1	Set 2	Set 3
26 Nov	Japan	0–2	China	21–11	21–18	

Final

Date		Score		Set 1	Set 2	Set 3
27 Nov	Myanmar	2–1	China (silver)	15–21	21–14	16–17

=== Women's regu ===
Team

Cui Yonghui
Gu Xihui
Song Cheng
Wang Xiaohua
Zhou Ronghong

Pos	Team	Pld	W	L	SF	SA	SD	Pts
1	Thailand	3	3	0	6	1	+5	6
2	Vietnam	3	2	1	5	2	+3	4
3	China	3	1	2	2	5	−3	2
4	Myanmar	3	0	3	1	6	−5	0

Source: Results

Date		Score		Set 1	Set 2	Set 3
22 Nov	China	0–2	Thailand	10–21	7–21	
23 Nov	China	0–2	Vietnam	20–22	12–21	
24 Nov	China	2–1	Myanmar	21–17	12–21	15–13

=== Women's team ===
Team

Cui Yonghui
Gu Xihui
Lao Tianxue
Liu Xiaofang
Liu Yanhong
Song Cheng
Sun Xiaodan
Wang Xiaohua
Zhang Yanan
Zhao Tengfei
Zhou Ronghong

Preliminary

Group B

Pos	Team	Pld	W	L	MF	MA	MD	Pts	Qualification
1	Thailand	3	3	0	9	0	+9	6	Semifinals
2	China	3	2	1	6	3	+3	4	Semifinals
3	South Korea	3	1	2	3	6	−3	2	
4	India	3	0	3	0	9	−9	0	

Source: Results

Date		Score		Regu 1	Regu 2	Regu 3
16 Nov	Thailand	3–0	China	2–0	2–0	2–0
17 Nov	China	3–0	India	2–0	2–0	2–0
18 Nov	South Korea	0–3	China	0–2	0–2	0–2

Semifinal

Date		Score		Regu 1	Regu 2	Regu 3
19 Nov	China	2–1	Indonesia	1–2	2–0	2–0

Final

Date		Score		Regu 1	Regu 2	Regu 3
20 Nov	Thailand	2–0	China (silver)	2–0	2–0	

== Shooting ==
Men

Event	Athlete	Qualification		Final	
Event	Athlete	Score	Rank	Score	Rank
Men's 10 m air pistol	Tan Zongliang	585-21x	1st	684.5	2nd place, silver medalist(s)
Men's 10 m air pistol	Pu Qifeng	580-16x	7th	677.7	8th
Men's 10 m air pistol	Pang Wei	578-22x	9th	did not advance	
Men's 10 m air pistol team	Tan Zongliang; Pu Qifeng; Pang Wei			1743-59x	2nd place, silver medalist(s)
Men's 10 m air rifle	Zhu Qinan	598-56x	1st	702.0	1st place, gold medalist(s)
Men's 10 m air rifle	Yu Jikang	595-42x	4th	696.7	6th
Men's 10 m air rifle	Cao Yifei	591-45x	14th	did not advance	
Men's 10 m air rifle team	Zhu Qinan; Yu Jikang; Cao Yifei			1784-143x	1st place, gold medalist(s)
Men's 10 m running target	Zhai Yujia			590-17x EWR/AR	1st place, gold medalist(s)
Men's 10 m running target	Gan Lin			569-12x	4th
Men's 10 m running target	Yang Ling			559-14x	9th
Men's 10 m running target team	Zhai Yujia; Gan Lin; Yang Ling			1718-43x	1st place, gold medalist(s)
Men's 10 m running target mixed	Zhai Yujia			381-12x	2nd place, silver medalist(s)
Men's 10 m running target mixed	Gan Lin			381- 8x	3rd place, bronze medalist(s)
Men's 10 m running target mixed	Yang Ling			373- 7x	11th
Men's 10 m running target mixed team	Zhai Yujia; Gan Lin; Yang Ling			1135-27x	2nd place, silver medalist(s)
Men's 25 m pistol	Jin Yongde			570-16x	3rd place, bronze medalist(s)
Men's 25 m pistol	Liu Yadong			570-16x	5th
Men's 25 m pistol	Li Chuanlin			567-15x	8th
Men's 25 m pistol team	Jin Yongde; Liu Yadong; Li Chuanlin			1707-47x	2nd place, silver medalist(s)
Men's 25 m rapid fire pistol	Li Yuehong	583-25x	1st	782.8	1st place, gold medalist(s)
Men's 25 m rapid fire pistol	Zhang Jian	582-11x	3rd	778.2	3rd place, bronze medalist(s)
Men's 25 m rapid fire pistol	Ding Feng	580-11x	4th	776.2	5th
Men's 25 m rapid fire pistol team	Li Yuehong; Zhang Jian; Ding Feng			1745-47x	1st place, gold medalist(s)
Men's 25 m center fire pistol	Liu Yadong			585-22x	2nd place, silver medalist(s)
Men's 25 m center fire pistol	Jin Yongde			581-28x	5th
Men's 25 m center fire pistol	Li Chuanlin			577-14x	17th
Men's 25 m center fire pistol team	Liu Yadong; Jin Yongde; Li Chuanlin			1743-64x	1st place, gold medalist(s)
Men's 50 m pistol	Pu Qifeng	565- 8x	2nd	661.5	1st place, gold medalist(s)
Men's 50 m pistol	Pang Wei	558- 9x	4th	651.0	5th
Men's 50 m pistol	Wu Jing	548- 5x	18th	did not advance	
Men's 50 m pistol team	Pu Qifeng; Pang Wei; Wu Jing			1671-22x	2nd place, silver medalist(s)
Men's 50 m rifle prone	Tian Hui	593-40x	5th	697.4	3rd place, bronze medalist(s)
Men's 50 m rifle prone	Tian Pu	592-38x	7th	695.6	6th
Men's 50 m rifle prone	Wang Weiyi	589-32x	17th	did not advance	
Men's 50 m rifle prone team	Tian Hui; Tian Pu; Wang Weiyi			1774-110x	2nd place, silver medalist(s)
Men's 50 m rifle three positions	Zhu Qinan	1161-58x	5th	1262.3	3rd place, bronze medalist(s)
Men's 50 m rifle three positions	Li Bo	1158-52x	9th	did not advance	
Men's 50 m rifle three positions	Cao Yifei	1152-44x	12th	did not advance	
Men's 50 m rifle three positions team	Zhu Qinan; Li Bo; Cao Yifei			3471-154x	3rd place, bronze medalist(s)
Men's Trap	Zhang Yongjie	115	7th	did not advance	
Men's Trap	Yu Xiaokai	114	13th	did not advance	
Men's Trap	Li Yajun	111	20th	did not advance	
Men's Trap team	Zhang Yongjie; Yu Xiaokai; Li Yajun			340	4th
Men's Double Trap	Pan Qiang	143	1st	181	5th
Men's Double Trap	Mo Junjie	136	5th	180	6th
Men's Double Trap	Hu Binyuan	135	9th	did not advance	
Men's Double Trap team	Pan Qiang; Mo Junjie; Hu Binyuan			414	1st place, gold medalist(s)
Men's Skeet	Tang Shuai	117	5th	137	4th
Men's Skeet	Qu Ridong	116	9th	did not advance	
Men's Skeet	Jin Di	112	19th	did not advance	
Men's Skeet team	Tang Shuai; Qu Ridong; Jin Di			345	3rd place, bronze medalist(s)

Women

Event	Athlete	Qualification		Final	
Event	Athlete	Score	Rank	Score	Rank
Women's 10 m air pistol	Sun Qi	385-10x	1st	481.7	2nd place, silver medalist(s)
Women's 10 m air pistol	Guo Wen Jun	382-10x	6th	479.2	4th
Women's 10 m air pistol	Su Yu Ling	372- 8x	30th	did not advance	
Women's 10 m air pistol team	Sun Qi; Guo Wen Jun; Su Yu Ling			1139-28x	3rd place, bronze medalist(s)
Women's 10 m air rifle	Yi Siling	399-38x	1st	504.9	1st place, gold medalist(s)
Women's 10 m air rifle	Wu Liuxi	398-37x	2nd	502.8	2nd place, silver medalist(s)
Women's 10 m air rifle	Yu Dan	397-33x	5th	500.8	4th
Women's 10 m air rifle team	Yi Siling; Wu Liuxi; Yu Dan			1194-108x	1st place, gold medalist(s)
Women's 10 m running target	Li Xueyan			388-15x	1st place, gold medalist(s)
Women's 10 m running target	Su Li			380-12x	2nd place, silver medalist(s)
Women's 10 m running target	Yang Zeng			378-10x	3rd
Women's 10 m running target team	Li Xueyan; Su Li; Yang Zeng			1146-37x	1st place, gold medalist(s)
Women's 25 m pistol	Su Yu Ling	580-21x	4th	780.1	6th
Women's 25 m pistol	Guo Wen Jun	568-15x	25th	651.0	5th
Women's 25 m pistol	Lu Miaoyi	565-14x	28th	did not advance	
Women's 25 m pistol team	Su Yu Ling; Guo Wen Jun; Lu Miaoyi			1713-50x	8th
Women's 50 m rifle prone	Wang Chengyi			595-38x	1st place, gold medalist(s)
Women's 50 m rifle prone	Hou Xiaoyu			586-27x	13th
Women's 50 m rifle prone	Huang Na			579-28x	35th
Women's 50 m rifle prone team	Wang Chengyi; Hou Xiaoyu; Huang Na			1760-93x	3rd place, bronze medalist(s)
Women's 50 m rifle three positions	Wang Chengyi	584-28x	1st	682.9	1st place, gold medalist(s)
Women's 50 m rifle three positions	Wu Liuxi	578-26x	3rd	680.1	3rd place, bronze medalist(s)
Women's 50 m rifle three positions	Yi Siling	571-17x	18th	did not advance	
Women's 50 m rifle three positions team	Wang Chengyi; Wu Liuxi; Yi Siling			1733-71x	1st place, gold medalist(s)
Women's Trap	Liu Yingzi	68	3rd	84	3rd place, bronze medalist(s)
Women's Trap	Gao E	66	5th	85	2nd place, silver medalist(s)
Women's Trap	Tian Xia	66	6th	79	6th
Women's Trap team	Liu Yingzi; Gao E Tian Xia			200	1st place, gold medalist(s)
Women's Double Trap	Li Qingnian			106	1st place, gold medalist(s)
Women's Double Trap	Li Rui			105	2nd place, silver medalist(s)
Women's Double Trap	Zhang Yafei			104	3rd
Women's Double Trap team	Li Qingnian; Li Rui; Zhang Yafei			315	1st place, gold medalist(s)
Women's Skeet	Wei Ning	71	1st	94	1st place, gold medalist(s)
Women's Skeet	Zhang Shan	65	6th	84	4th
Women's Skeet	Wei Meng	65	7th	did not advance	
Women's Skeet team	Wei Ning; Zhang Shan; Wei Meng			201	1st place, gold medalist(s)

== Soft Tennis ==
Athlete	Event	Round Group			1st Round	Quarterfinals	Semifinals	Final
Athlete	Event	Match 1	Match 2	Match 3	1st Round	Quarterfinals	Semifinals	Final
Athlete	Event	Opposition Result	Opposition Result	Opposition Result	Opposition Result	Opposition Result	Opposition Result	Opposition Result
Chen Mingdong	Men's Singles	Hidenori Shinohara (JPN); W 4–1 (4–1, 1–4, 4–2, 5–3, 5–3)	Donedy Keodalasouk (LAO); W 4–1 (4–6, 4–2, 4–0, 4–1, 9–7)		BYE	Bae Hwansung (KOR); L 3–4 (0–4, 5–3, 1–4, 4–1, 1–4, 4–2, 3–7)	did not advance	
Shi Bo	Men's Singles	Jitender Mehlda (IND); W 4–0 (4–2, 5–3, 4–0, 4–0)	Rahmatullojon Rajabaliev (TJK); W 4–0 (4–0, 4–0, 4–0, 6–4)	Kuo Chia Wei (TPE); W 4–3 (6–4, 4–2, 4–2, 0–4, 2–4, 0–4, 8–6)	BYE	Lee Yohan (KOR); L 1–4 (0–4, 1–4, 4–2, 3–5, 0–4)	did not advance	
Shi Bo; Jiao Yang	Men's Doubles	Ananda Khamphoumy (LAO) and Anandone Khamphoumy (LAO); W 5–2 (0–4, 4–2, 4–2, 4–1, 4–0, 1–4, 4–2)	Koji Kobayashi (JPN) and Hidenori Shinohara (JPN); L 2–5 (1–4, 2–4, 3–5, 7–5, 1–4, 4–1, 3–5)		Koji Kobayashi (JPN) and Hidenori Shinohara (JPN); L 0–5 (1–4, 0–4, 0–4, 1–4, 1–4)	did not advance		
Chai Jin; Li Xiang	Men's Doubles	Donedy Keodalasouk (LAO) and Bounthavong Sirisak (LAO); W 5–0 (4–2, 4–2, 4–1, 4–0, 4–0)	Shigeo Nakahori (JPN) and Tsuneo Takagawa (JPN); L 1–5 (2–4, 0–4, 7–5, 1–4, 2–4, 0–4)		Navneet Kumar (IND) and Atul Sri Patel (IND); W 5–0 (4–2, 5–3, 7–5, 4–0, 5–3)	Shigeo Nakahori (JPN) and Tsuneo Takagawa (JPN); L 2–5 (4–2, 4–6, 0–4, 3–5, 4–2, 2–4, 2–4)	did not advance	
Gao Tong	Women's Singles	Tsetsenbayar Dash (MGL); W 4–0 (4–1, 4–0, 4–2, 4–0)	Taruka Srivastav (IND); W 4–0 (4–1, 4–1, 4–1, 4–2)	Ayaka Oba (JPN); L 0–4 (2–4, 3–5, 2–4, 2–4)	Cheryl Macasera (PHI); W 4–2 (6–4, 4–1, 1–4, 2–4, 4–1, 4–2)	Zhao Lei (CHN); L 0–4 (1–4, 1–4, 2–4, 0–4)	did not advance	
Zhao Lei	Women's Singles	Noelle Zoleta (PHI); W 4–1 (4–1, 4–1, 4–0, 2–4, 4–0)	Chang Wen Hsin (TPE); W 4–0 (4–1, 4–1, 4–0, 4–0)		BYE	Gao Tong (CHN); W 4–0 (4–1, 4–1, 4–2, 4–0)	Kyungryun Kim (KOR); W 4–3 (4–2, 4–1, 2–4, 4–1, 0–4, 1–4, 7–3)	Aekyung Kim (KOR); W 4–1 (2–4, 4–0, 4–2, 4–1, 4–1) (gold)
Yani Xin; Zhao Lei	Women's Doubles	Norovsuren Bulgan (MGL) and Bounthavong Sirisak (MGL); W 5–0 (4–2, 4–2, 4–1, 4–0, 4–0)	Priyanka Bugade (IND) and Samia Rizvi (IND); W 5–1 (4–0, 2–4, 4–0, 4–1, 4–0, 4–2)	Ayaka Oba (JPN) and Mai Sasaki (JPN); W 5–1 (4–1, 4–0, 5–3, 4–2, 2–4, 4–1)		Gao Tong (CHN) and Qiu Sisi (CHN); W 5–1 (4–2, 4–1, 4–2, 1–4, 5–4, RET)	Hitomi Sugimoto (JPN) and Eri Uehara (JPN); L 2–5 (3–5, 5–3, 5–3, 4–6, 1–4, 0–4, 4–6) (bronze)	did not advance
Gao Tong; Qiu Sisi	Women's Doubles	Namuudari Bold (MGL) and Gancnimeg Sugar (MGL); W 5–0 (4–0, 5–3, 4–0, 4–1, 4–1)	Monica Murli Menon (IND) and Taruka Srivastav (IND); W 5–0 (4–0, 4–1, 4–0, 4–0, 4–1)	Joo Og (KOR) and Kim Aekyung (KOR); L 4–5 (2–4, 5–3, 0–4, 4–2, 5–3, 3–5, 9–7, 3–5, 6–8)		Yani Xin (CHN) and Zhao Lei (CHN); L 1–5 (2–4, 1–4, 2–4, 4–1, 4–5, RET)	did not advance	
Yang Jiao; Qiu Sisi	Mixed Doubles				Nasir Mohammed (IND) and Taruka Srivastav (IND); W 5–1 (6–4, 4–2, 4–0, 2–4, 5–3, 4–1)	Ji Yongmin (KOR) and Kim Kyungryun (KOR); L 2–5 (3–5, 4–1, 0–4, 4–6, 4–0, 3–5, 5–7)	did not advance	
Li Xiang; Xin Yani	Mixed Doubles				Rahmatullojon Rajabaliev (TJK) and Shabnam Yusupzhanova (TJK); W 5–0 (4–1, 4–1, 4–2, 4–1, 4–0)	Kim Aekyung (KOR) and Kim Taejung (KOR); L 0–5 (2–4, 0–4, 0–4, 4–6, 0–4)	did not advance	
Chai Jin; Li Xiang; Chen Mingdong; Jiao Yang; Shi Bo	Men's Team	Mongolia (MGL); W 3–0 (5–0, 4–0, 5–0)	India (IND); W 3–0 (5–1, 4–0, 5–0)	South Korea (KOR); L 1–2 (0–5, 4–2, 4–5)			Japan (JPN); L 1–2 (2–5, 4–1, 3–5) (bronze)	did not advance
Gao Tong; Hao Jie; Qiu Sisi; Xin Yani; Zhao Lei	Women's Team	Mongolia (MGL); W 2–1 (4–5, 4–2, 5–1)	Laos (LAO); W 3–0 (5–0, 4–0, 5–0)	Japan (JPN); L 1–2 (2–5, 4–3, 0–5)			Chinese Taipei (TPE); L 0–2 (0–5, 2–4) (bronze)	did not advance

== Softball ==
=== Women ===
Team

Lu Wei
Li Qi
Li Chunxia
Lu Ying
Lu Yi
Wei Dongmei
Zhang Lifang
Xu Min
Zhou Yi
Tan Ying
Wang Yuan
Zhao Jing
Guo Jia
Wang Lan
Li Huan

Preliminaries

Pos	Team	Pld	W	L	RF	RA	PCT	GB	Qualification
1	Chinese Taipei	5	5	0	26	7	1.000	—	Semifinals
2	Japan	5	4	1	25	3	.800	1	Semifinals
3	China	5	3	2	24	9	.600	2	Semifinals
4	South Korea	5	2	3	13	14	.400	3	Semifinals
5	Philippines	5	1	4	7	24	.200	4	
6	Thailand	5	0	5	2	40	.000	5	

Source: Results

November 19 18:00 at Tianhe Softball Field, Guangzhou
Team	1	2	3	4	5	6	7	R	H	E
China	0	3	2	0	2	0	0	7	9	2
Philippines	0	0	0	0	1	0	0	1	4	2
WP: Lu Wei LP: Mary Joy Lasquite

November 20 15:30 at Tianhe Softball Field, Guangzhou
Team	1	2	3	4	5	6	7	R	H	E
China	0	1	2	3	3	X	X	9	10	0
Thailand	0	0	0	0	0	X	X	0	1	1
WP: Wang Lan LP: Sasithorn Wilairak

November 21 13:00 at Tianhe Softball Field, Guangzhou
Team	1	2	3	4	5	6	7	R	H	E
China	0	2	0	1	0	0	1	4	7	0
South Korea	0	0	0	0	0	0	0	0	5	3
WP: Li Qi LP: Park Su-Youn

November 22 18:00 at Tianhe Softball Field, Guangzhou
Team	1	2	3	4	5	6	7	R	H	E
Chinese Taipei	0	0	4	2	0	0	0	6	6	2
China	0	0	0	0	0	3	0	3	6	1
WP: Chung Hui-lin LP: Li Qi; Home runs: TPE: Chiang Hui-chuan (1); CHN: None

November 23 15:30 at Tianhe Softball Field, Guangzhou
Team	1	2	3	4	5	6	7	R	H	E
Japan	1	0	0	1	0	0	0	2	6	2
China	1	0	0	0	0	0	0	1	3	2
WP: Yukiko Ueno LP: Li Qi

Semifinals

November 25 18:30 at Tianhe Softball Field, Guangzhou
Team	1	2	3	4	5	6	7	R	H	E
South Korea	1	0	0	0	0	0	0	1	2	4
China	0	3	1	0	3	0	X	7	10	1
WP: Wang Lan LP: Park Su-Youn

Final

November 26 13:00 at Tianhe Softball Field, Guangzhou
Team	1	2	3	4	5	6	7	R	H	E
China	2	0	0	0	0	0	0	2	7	0
Chinese Taipei	0	0	0	0	0	1	0	1	5	1
WP: Li Qi LP: Chung Hui-lin

Grand final

November 26 18:30 at Tianhe Softball Field, Guangzhou
Team	1	2	3	4	5	6	7	R	H	E
Japan	0	0	0	1	0	1	0	2	7	1
China	0	0	0	0	0	0	0	0	1	0
WP: Yukiko Ueno LP: Wang Lan

== Squash ==
Athlete	Event	1st Round	2nd Round	Quarterfinals	Semifinals	Final
Athlete	Event	Opposition Result	Opposition Result	Opposition Result	Opposition Result	Opposition Result
Meng Xiaomin	Men's singles	BYE	Lee Ho Yin (HKG); L 0–3 (3–11, 3–11, 3–11)	did not advance		
Wang Junjie	Men's singles	Ahmad Al Zabidi (JOR); L 0–3 (7–11, 2–11, 3–11)	did not advance			
Gu Jinyue	Women's singles		Dipika Rebecca Pallikal (IND); L 0–3 (4–11, 10–12, 1–11)	did not advance		
Li Dongjin	Women's singles		Song Sun Mi (KOR); L 1–3 (8–11, 11–6, 8–11, 6–11)	did not advance		

Athlete	Event	Pool Summary				Semifinals	Final
Athlete	Event	Contest 1	Contest 2	Contest 3	Contest 4	Semifinals	Final
Athlete	Event	Opposition Result	Opposition Result	Opposition Result	Opposition Result	Opposition Result	Opposition Result
Meng Xiaomin; Wang Junjie; Shen Jiaqi	Men's Team	Kuwait (KUW); L 0–3 (0–3, 0–3, 0–3)	Hong Kong (HKG); L 0–3 (0–3, 0–3, 0–3)	Pakistan (PAK); L 0–3 (0–3, 0–3, 0–3)	Sri Lanka (SRI); L 0–3 (2–3, 1–3, 2–3)	did not advance	
Gu Jinyue; Li Dongjin; Jiang Li	Women's Team	India (IND); L 0–3 (0–3, 0–3, 0–3)	Hong Kong (HKG); L 0–3 (0–3, 0–3, 0–3)	Pakistan (PAK); W 2–1 (3–0, 0–3, 3–0)		did not advance	

== Table Tennis ==
Athlete	Event	Round of 64	Round of 32	Round of 16	Quarterfinals	Semifinals	Final
Athlete	Event	Opposition Result	Opposition Result	Opposition Result	Opposition Result	Opposition Result	Opposition Result
Ma Long	Men's singles	BYE	Tuan Quynh Tran (VIE); W 4–0 (12–10, 11–5, 11–4, 11–6)	Kenta Matsudaira (JPN); W 4–2 (11–9, 8–11, 8–11, 11–8, 11–9, 11–4)	Chuang Chih Yuan (TPE); W 4–2 (12–10, 7–11, 7–11, 14–12, 11–1, 11–8)	Saehyuk Joo (KOR); W 4–0 (11–4, 11–7, 11–5, 11–9)	Wang Hao (CHN); W 4–2 (9–11, 11–8, 11–7, 11–3, 4–11, 12–10) (gold)
Wang Hao	Men's singles	BYE	Husain Albahrani (KUW); W 4–0 (11–1, 11–5, 11–6, 11–5)	Noshad Alamiyan (IRI); W 4–2 (11–7, 11–6, 11–4, 11–4)	Oh Sang Eun (KOR); W 4–3 (11–4, 9–11, 6–11, 11–5, 7–11, 11–4, 11–3)	Jun Mizutani (JPN); W 4–0 (12–10, 11–4, 11–4, 11–5)	Ma Long (CHN); L 2–4 (11–9, 8–11, 7–11, 3–11, 11–4, 10–12) (silver)
Wang Hao; Zhang Jike	Men's Doubles		Mohammadreza Akhlaghpasand (IRI) and Noshad Alamiyan (IRI); W 3–0 (11–3, 11–4, 11–3)	Rashed Mohd Hassan (UAE) and Rashid Omar (UAE); W 3–0 (11–7, 11–6, 11–4)	Cheung Yuk (HKG) and Li Ching (HKG); W 3–0 (11–7, 11–7, 11–7)	Jeoung Young Sik (KOR) and Kim Min Seok (KOR); W 4–3 (11–4, 11–4, 11–13, 7–11, 5–11, 11–3, 11–6)	Ma Lin (CHN) and Xu Xin (CHN); W 4–2 (11–2, 12–10, 10–12, 9–11, 11–5, 11–3) (gold)
Ma Lin; Xu Xin	Men's Doubles		Huy Hoang Phan (VIE) and Tuan Quynh Tran (VIE); W 3–0 (11–7, 11–2, 11–4)	Mohammed Al Saadi (QAT) and Waleed Nasser Alhajjai (QAT); W 3–0 (11–1, 11–4, 11–3)	Ning Gao (SIN) and Yang Zi (SIN); W 3–1 (6–11, 11–3, 11–8, 11–4)	Kenta Matsudaira (JPN) and Koki Niwa (JPN); W 4–1 (11–6, 8–11, 11–6, 11–6, 11–5)	Wang Hao (CHN) and Zhang Jike (CHN); L 2–4 (2–11, 10–12, 12–10, 11–9, 5–11, 3–11) (silver)
Li Xiaoxia	Women's singles	BYE	Zulfiniso Saidalimova (TJK); W 4–0 (11–1, 11–2, 11–3, 11–3)	Suthasini Sawettabut (THA); W 4–0 (11–7, 11–9, 11–4, 11–4)	Tian Wei Feng (SIN); W 4–1 (9–11, 11–8, 11–9, 11–7, 11–4)	Kim Kyung Ah (KOR); W 4–0 (11–8, 11–7, 11–5, 11–5)	Guo Yue (CHN); W 4–3 (5–11, 4–11, 11–13, 11–8, 11–6, 12–10, 11–9) (gold)
Guo Yue	Women's singles	BYE	Thiphakone Southamavong (LAO); W 4–0 (11–5, 11–1, 11–1, 11–4)	Park Miyoung (KOR); W 4–1 (7–11, 11–3, 11–5, 11–6, 11–6)	Jiang Huajun (HKG); W 4–0 (12–10, 13–11, 11–8, 11–8)	Ai Fukuhara (JPN); W 4–3 (5–11, 10–12, 11–8, 9–11, 11–9, 11–8, 11–8)	Li Xiaoxia (CHN); L 3–4 (11–5, 11–4, 13–11, 8–11, 6–11, 10–12, 9–11) (silver)
Li Xiaoxia; Guo Yue	Women's Doubles		Seok Hajung (KOR) and Yang Ha Eun (KOR); W 3–0 (12–10, 11–3, 16–14)	Sengdavy Phiathep (LAO) and Thiphakone Southamavong (LAO); W 3–0 (11–2, 11–1, 11–1)	Cheng I Ching (TPE) and Huang Yi Hua (TPE); W 3–0 (11–7, 11–6, 11–7)	Hiroko Fujii (JPN) and Misako Wakamiya (JPN); W 4–1 (11–3, 11–1, 11–13, 11–2, 11–7)	Ding Ning (CHN) and Liu Shiwen (CHN); W 4–0 (11–5, 11–7, 11–6, 11–3) (gold)
Ding Ning; Liu Shiwen	Women's Doubles		Hye Song Han (PRK) and Hyon Ryon Hui (PRK); W 3–0 (11–3, 11–6, 11–7)	Swechchha Nambang (NEP) and Nabita Shrestha (NEP); W 3–0 (11–2, 11–3, 11–4)	Li Jiawei (SIN) and Sun Beibei (SIN); W 3–1 (9–11, 11–4, 11–6, 11–4)	Ai Fukuhara (JPN) and Kasumi Ishikawa (JPN); W 4–0 (11–8, 11–8, 11–5, 11–7)	Li Xiaoxia (CHN) and Guo Yue (CHN); L 0–4 (5–11, 7–11, 6–11, 3–11) (silver)
Xu Xin; Guo Yan	Mixed Doubles		Rachid El Boubou (LIB) and Tvin Carole Moumjoghlian (LIB); W 3–0 (11–4, 11–2, 11–4)	Rashid Ahmedov (TKM) and Jennet Hanova (TKM); W 3–0 (11–3, 11–4, 11–3)	Tang Peng (HKG) and Tie Ya Na (HKG); W 3–1 (11–13, 11–7, 11–4, 14–12)	Kenta Matsudaira (JPN) and Kasumi Ishikawa (JPN); W 4–0 (11–8, 11–5, 11–8, 11–6)	Cheung Yuk (HKG) and Jiang Huajun (HKG); W 4–1 (15–13, 11–8, 7–11, 11–8, 11–3) (gold)
Zhang Jike; Ding Ning	Mixed Doubles		Fahed Almughanne (QAT) and Aia Magdy Mohamed (QAT); W 3–0 (WO)	Lee Jungwoo (KOR) and Seok Hajung (KOR); W 3–0 (11–3, 11–7, 11–2)	Cheung Yuk (HKG) and Jiang Huajun (HKG); L 2–3 (11–6, 10–12, 7–11, 11–7, 7–11)	did not advance	

Athlete	Event	Pool Summary			Quarterfinals	Semifinals	Final
Athlete	Event	Contest 1	Contest 2	Contest 3	Quarterfinals	Semifinals	Final
Athlete	Event	Opposition Result	Opposition Result	Opposition Result	Opposition Result	Opposition Result	
Ma Lin; Ma Long; Wang Hao; Xu Xin; Zhang Jike	Men's Team	North Korea (PRK); W 3–0 (3–1, 3–1, 3–0)	Qatar (QAT); W 3–0 (3–0, 3–0, 3–0)	Laos (LAO); W 3–0 (3–0, 3–0, 3–0)	Singapore (SIN); W 3–0 (3–1, 3–1, 3–0)	Japan (JPN); W 3–0 (3–1, 3–0, 3–1)	South Korea (KOR); W 3–0 (3–0, 3–0, 3–0) (gold)
Ding Ning; Guo Yan; Guo Yue; Li Xiaoxia; Liu Shiwen	Women's Team	Chinese Taipei (TPE); W 3–1 (1–3, 3–0, 3–0, 3–2)	Japan (JPN); W 3–0 (3–0, 3–0, 3–0)	Tajikistan (TJK); W 3–0 (3–0, 3–0, 3–0)	India (IND); W 3–0 (3–0, 3–0, 3–0)	South Korea (KOR); W 3–1 (2–3, 3–0, 3–1, 3–1)	Singapore (SIN); W 3–0 (3–0, 3–0, 3–0) (gold)

== Taekwondo ==
=== Men ===
Athlete	Event	Round of 32	Round of 16	Quarterfinals	Semifinals	Final
Athlete	Event	Opposition Result	Opposition Result	Opposition Result	Opposition Result	Opposition Result
Xu Yongzeng	Flyweight (–58kg)	Tshewang Tshewang (BHU); W PTS 9–5	le Huynh Chau (VIE); W PTS 4–3	Davlatmurod Karimov (TJK); W PTS 6–2	Pen-Ek Karaket (THA); L PTS 2–6 (bronze)	did not advance
Huang Jiannan	Featherweight (–68kg)	Ghali Almatrafi (KSA); W PTS 9–2	Mesfer Alajmi (KUW); W PTS 10–2	Erdenebaatar Naranchimeg (MGL); W PTS 13–4	Mohammad Bagheri Motamed (IRI); L PTS 3–8 (bronze)	did not advance
Li Lai	Lightweight (–74kg)	BYE	Alireza Nassrazadany (IRI); L DSQ Round2 0:00	did not advance		
Zhao Lin	Welterweight (–80kg)	Md.mizanur Rahaman (BAN); W PTS 12–2	Tashi Tashi (BHU); W PTS 9–6	Alisher Gulov (TJK); W PTS 6–5	Nabil Hassan (JOR); L PTS 1–5 (bronze)	did not advance
Yin Zhimeng	Middleweight (–87kg)		Sonam Penjor (BHU); W PTS 8–0	Rizal Samsir (INA); W PTS 11–1	Yousef Karami (IRI); L PTS 1–3 (bronze)	did not advance
Zheng Yi	Heavyweight (+87kg)		BYE	Mohammad Imar (JOR); W PTS 9–8	Arman Chilmanov (KAZ); W PTS 15–13	Heo Jung Nyoung (KOR); L PTS 4–11 (silver)

=== Women ===
Athlete	Event	Round of 32	Round of 16	Quarterfinals	Semifinals	Final
Athlete	Event	Opposition Result	Opposition Result	Opposition Result	Opposition Result	Opposition Result
Wu Jingyu	Flyweight (–49kg)		BYE	Raya Hatahet (JOR); W PTS 20–2	Chanapa Sonkham (THA); W PTS 5–0	Erika Kasahara (JPN); W PTS 13–1 (gold)
Lei Jie	Bantamweight (–53kg)	Humaira Mohammadi (AFG); W PTS 17–3	Shahd Tarman (JOR); L PTS 1–9	did not advance		
Hou Yuzhuo	Featherweight (–57kg)	BYE	Basma Ahmad Essa (UAE); W PTS 10–0	Shantibala Devi Y (IND); W PTS 13–0	Sousan Hajipourgoli (IRI); W PTS 3–0	Lee Sung Hye (KOR); L SUP 0–0 (silver)
Guo Yunfei	Welterweight (–67kg)			Hoang Dieu Linh Chu (VIE); W PTS 6–4	Kang Bo Hyeon (KOR); W PTS 3–0	Parisa Farshidi (IRI); W PTS 4–2 (gold)
Luo Wei	Middleweight (–73kg)			BYE	Rapatkorn Prasopsuk (THA); W PTS 2–1	Feruza Yergeshova (KAZ); W PTS 5–4 (gold)
Liu Rui	Heavyweight (+73kg)			BYE	Evgeniya Karimova (UZB); W PTS 4–2	Oh Jungah (KOR); W PTS 4–3 (gold)

== Tennis ==
Athlete	Event	Round of 64	Round of 32	Round of 16	Quarterfinals	Semifinals	Final
Athlete	Event	Opposition Result	Opposition Result	Opposition Result	Opposition Result	Opposition Result	Opposition Result
Wu Di	Men's singles	BYE	Harshana Godamanna (SRI); W 6–2, 6–2	Kittipong Wachiramanowong (THA); W 6–3, 7–6(8)	Go Soeda (JPN); L 2–6, 3–6	did not advance	
Zhang Ze	Men's singles	BYE	Omar Sulaiman Al Thagib (KSA); W 6–0, 6–0	Cho-Soong Jae (KOR); W 6–4, 6–4	Somdev Devvarman (IND); L 4–6, 4–6	did not advance	
Bai Yan; Zhang Ze	Men's doubles		Vimuktha Gerald de Alwis (SRI) and Thangarajah Dineshkanthan (SRI); W 6–0, 6–3	Murad Inoyatov (UZB) and Denis Istomin (UZB); W 6–2, 6–3	Somdev Devvarman (IND) and Sanam Singh (IND); L 2–6, 4–6	did not advance	
Gong Maoxin; Li Zhe	Men's doubles		BYE	Le Quoc Khanh (VIE) and Nguyen Hoang Thien (VIE); W 6–2, 6–0	Kim Young Jun (KOR) and Seol Jae Min (KOR); W 6–3, 3–6, [10–6]	Yi Chu-huan (TPE) and Lee Hsin-han (TPE); W 6–4, 7–6(3)	Somdev Devvarman (IND) and Sanam Singh (IND); L 3–6, 7–6(4), [8–10] (silver)
Peng Shuai	Women's singles		Aslesha Lissanevitch (NEP); W 6–0, 6–0	Fatma Al Nabhani (OMA); W 6–1, 6–2	Chang Kai-chen (TPE); W 6–2, 7–6(1)	Kimiko Date-Krumm (JPN); W 7–6(6), 3–6, 6–2	Akgul Amanmuradova (UZB); W 7–5, 6–2 (gold)
Zhang Shuai	Women's singles		Malika Rana (NEP); W 6–0, 6–0	Sania Mirza (IND); L 2–6, 2–6	did not advance		
Sun Shengnan; Zhang Shuai	Women's doubles		BYE	Tara Iyer (IND) and Nirupama Sanjeev (IND); W 6–4, 7–5	Chan Yung-jan (TPE) and Chuang Chia-jung (TPE); L 1–6, 7–6(5), [6–10]	did not advance	
Peng Shuai; Yan Zi	Women's doubles		BYE	Nungnadda Wannasuk (THA) and Varatchaya Wongteanchai (THA); W 6–3, 6–2	Akgul Amanmuradova (UZB) and Albina Khabibulina (UZB); W 6–4, 6–3	Chan Yung-jan (TPE) and Chuang Chia-jung (TPE); L 7–5, 0–6, [9–11] (bronze)	did not advance
Sun Shengnan; Bai Yan	Mixed doubles		Huynh Phuongh Dai Trang (VIE) and Le Quoc Khanh (VIE); W 6–2, 6–3	Sania Mirza (IND) and Vishnu Vardhan (IND); L 3–6, 6–4, [10–12]	did not advance		
Han Xinyun; Gong Maoxin	Mixed doubles		BYE	Kim Na Ri (KOR) and Kim Hyun Joon (KOR); W 6–3, 3–6, [10–6]	Chan Yung-jan (TPE) and Yang Tsung-hua (TPE); L 3–6, 2–6	did not advance	
Gong Maoxin; Li Zhe; Wu Di; Zhang Ze	Men's team		BYE	Nepal (NEP); W 3–0 (2–0, 2–0, 2–0)	Japan (JPN); L 0–3 (1–2, 0–2, 0–2)	did not advance	
Peng Shuai; Yan Zi; Li Na; Zhang Shuai	Women's team			BYE	Kyrgyzstan (KGZ); W 3–0 (2–0, 2–0, 2–0)	Thailand (THA); W 3–0 (2–0, 2–0, 2–0)	Chinese Taipei (TPE); W 2–1 (2–0, 2–0, 0–2) (gold)

== Triathlon ==
Athlete	Event	Swim (1.5 km)	Trans 1	Bike (40 km)	Trans 2	Run (10 km)	Total	Rank
Jiang Zhihang	Men's Individual	19:03; 3rd	1:05; 5th	1:00:06; 8th	0:40; 5th	34:08; 10th	1:55:03.77	9th
Sun Liwei	Men's Individual	20:23; 12th	1:08; 10th	1:01:03; 11th	0:41; 6th	32:07; 3rd	1:55:24.02	10th
Fan Dan	Women's Individual	20:00; 5th	1:12; 1st	1:08:07; 3rd	0:45; 3rd	38:41; 5th	2:08:47.74	5th
Liu Ting	Women's Individual	21:26; 6th	1:18; 7th	1:06:36; 2nd	0:48; 6th	39:04; 7th	2:09:15.11	6th

== Volleyball ==
=== Men ===
Team

Bian Hongmin
Chen Ping
Cui Jianjun
Guo Peng
Jiao Shuai
Li Runming
Liang Chunlong
Ren Qi
Shen Qiong
Yuan Zhi
Zhang Chen
Zhong Weijun

==== Preliminary ====
Group A

Pos	Team	Pld	W	L	Pts	SPW	SPL	SPR	SW	SL	SR	Qualification
1	China	3	3	0	6	268	220	1.218	9	2	4.500	Second round / Group E–F
2	Thailand	3	2	1	5	305	300	1.017	7	7	1.000	Second round / Group E–F
3	Pakistan	3	1	2	4	283	308	0.919	6	8	0.750	Second round / Group G–H
4	Chinese Taipei	3	0	3	3	254	282	0.901	4	9	0.444	Second round / Group G–H

Source: Results

Date	Time		Score		Set 1	Set 2	Set 3	Set 4	Set 5	Total
13 Nov	20:00	China	3–1	Pakistan	20–25	25–13	25–19	25–15		95–72
14 Nov	20:00	China	3–0	Chinese Taipei	25–18	25–18	25–21			75–57
17 Nov	18:00	China	3–1	Thailand	25–19	21–25	25–22	27–25		98–91

==== Second round ====
- The results and the points of the matches between the same teams that were already played during the preliminary round shall be taken into account for the second round.

Group E

Pos	Team	Pld	W	L	Pts	SPW	SPL	SPR	SW	SL	SR	Qualification
1	Iran	3	3	0	6	231	189	1.222	9	0	MAX	Quarterfinals
2	China	3	2	1	5	234	220	1.064	6	4	1.500	Quarterfinals
3	Thailand	3	1	2	4	263	288	0.913	4	8	0.500	Quarterfinals
4	Saudi Arabia	3	0	3	3	230	261	0.881	2	9	0.222	Quarterfinals

Source: Results

Date	Time		Score		Set 1	Set 2	Set 3	Set 4	Set 5	Total
19 Nov	20:00	China	3–0	Saudi Arabia	25–20	25–15	25–17			75–52
20 Nov	20:00	China	0–3	Iran	17–25	19–25	25–27			61–77

==== Final round ====
Quarterfinals

Date	Time		Score		Set 1	Set 2	Set 3	Set 4	Set 5	Total
21 Nov	14:00	China	0–3	Japan	14–25	22–25	23–25			59–75

Placement 5–8

Date	Time		Score		Set 1	Set 2	Set 3	Set 4	Set 5	Total
24 Nov	16:00	Saudi Arabia	0–3	China	20–25	21–25	15–25			56–75

Placement 5th–6th

Date	Time		Score		Set 1	Set 2	Set 3	Set 4	Set 5	Total
26 Nov	20:00	India	0–3	China	18–25	17–25	18–25			53–75

=== Women ===
Team

Wang Yimei
Zhang Lei
Yang Jie
Shen Jingsi
Zhou Suhong
Zhang Xian
Wei Qiuyue
Li Juan
Xu Yunli
Xue Ming
Chen Liyi
Ma Yunwen

==== Preliminary ====
Group A

Pos	Team	Pld	W	L	Pts	SPW	SPL	SPR	SW	SL	SR	Qualification
1	China	4	4	0	8	360	225	1.600	12	3	4.000	Quarterfinals
2	South Korea	4	3	1	7	320	214	1.495	11	3	3.667	Quarterfinals
3	Thailand	4	2	2	6	295	232	1.272	7	6	1.167	Quarterfinals
4	Mongolia	4	1	3	5	175	251	0.697	3	9	0.333	Quarterfinals
5	Tajikistan	4	0	4	4	72	300	0.240	0	12	0.000	Placement 9–11

Source: Results

Date	Time		Score		Set 1	Set 2	Set 3	Set 4	Set 5	Total
18 Nov	20:00	Tajikistan	0–3	China	5–25	4–25	2–25			11–75
20 Nov	20:00	China	3–2	South Korea	23–25	23–25	25–22	25–17	15–6	111–95
21 Nov	20:00	Mongolia	0–3	China	9–25	13–25	8–25			30–75
22 Nov	20:00	China	3–1	Thailand	25–23	25–21	24–26	25–19		99–89

==== Final round ====
Quarterfinals

Date	Time		Score		Set 1	Set 2	Set 3	Set 4	Set 5	Total
24 Nov	20:00	China	3–0	Chinese Taipei	25–10	25–18	25–19			75–47

Semifinals

Date	Time		Score		Set 1	Set 2	Set 3	Set 4	Set 5	Total
25 Nov	20:00	China	3–0	North Korea	25–11	25–20	25–15			75–46

Gold medal match

Date	Time		Score		Set 1	Set 2	Set 3	Set 4	Set 5	Total
27 Nov	14:00	South Korea	2–3	China	25–21	25–22	10–25	17–25	14–16	91–109

== Weightlifting ==
Athlete	Event	Snatch			Clean & Jerk			Total	Rank
Athlete	Event	Attempt 1	Attempt 2	Attempt 3	Attempt 1	Attempt 2	Attempt 3	Total	Rank
Wu Jingbiao	Men's 56 kg	128	133 AR	~~136~~	152	~~160~~	~~160~~	285	1st place, gold medalist(s)
Zhang Jie	Men's 62 kg	140	~~145~~	145	172	176	~~182~~	321	1st place, gold medalist(s)
Su Dajin	Men's 77 kg	~~158~~	158	~~161~~	~~190~~	~~190~~	~~190~~	---	---
Jiang Hairong	Men's 85 kg	167	~~172~~	~~172~~	~~202~~	202	~~209~~	369	4th
Lu Yong	Men's 85 kg	~~170~~	170	173	201	203	---	376	1st place, gold medalist(s)
Zhang Shengguo	Men's 94 kg	170	~~175~~	~~175~~	210	~~214~~	~~214~~	380	4th
Yang Zhe	Men's 105 kg	180	185	~~188~~	212	217	~~219~~	402	1st place, gold medalist(s)
Wang Mingjuan	Women's 48 kg	89	91	95	110	115	~~117~~	210	1st place, gold medalist(s)
Li Ping	Women's 53 kg	96	100	103 WR/AR	123	127	~~130~~	230 WR/AR	1st place, gold medalist(s)
Li Xueying	Women's 58 kg	105	105	~~107~~	128	133	~~135~~	238	1st place, gold medalist(s)
Chen Aichan	Women's 63 kg	~~105~~	105	108	125	~~130~~	~~131~~	233	3rd place, bronze medalist(s)
Liu Chunhong	Women's 69 kg	~~106~~	106	110	128	132	---	242	1st place, gold medalist(s)
Cao Lei	Women's 75 kg	110	115	118	137	143	147	265	2nd place, silver medalist(s)
Meng Suping	Women's +75 kg	130	~~135~~	135	~~175~~	176	~~182~~	311	2nd place, silver medalist(s)

== Wrestling ==
=== Men ===
Freestyle

Athlete	Event	Round of 32	Round of 16	Quarterfinals	Semifinals	Final
Athlete	Event	Opposition Result	Opposition Result	Opposition Result	Opposition Result	Opposition Result
Chen Hua	55 kg		Azhar Hussain (PAK); W VT 5–0	Kim Hyo-Sub (KOR); L PP 1–3	did not advance	
Gao Feng	60 kg	BYE	Ramazan Kambarov (TKM); W PO 3–0	Abdul Karim Wahedi (AFG); W PO 3–0	Ganzorigiin Mandakhnaran (MGL); L PP 1–3	Bronze medal match: Abdul Karim Wahedi (AFG); W PP 3–1 (bronze)
Shan Chengde	66 kg		Muhammad Ali (PAK); W PO 3–0	Mehdi Taghavi (IRI); L PP 1–3	Repechage round1 match: Leonid Spiridonov (KAZ); L PO 0–3	did not advance
Zhang Chongyao	74 kg		Lee Yun-Seok (KOR); L PP 1–3	did not advance		
La Baciren	96 kg		Chinchuluun Batchuluun (MGL); L PP 1–3	did not advance		
Liang Lei	120 kg		Nobuyoshi Arakida (JPN); W PP 3–1	Jung Yei-Hyun (KOR); W PP 3–1	Jargalsaikhany Chuluunbat (MGL); L PP 1–3	Bronze medal match: Hudayberdi Sahatov (TKM); W PO 3–0 (bronze)

Greco-Roman

Athlete	Event	Round of 16	Quarterfinals	Semifinals	Final
Athlete	Event	Opposition Result	Opposition Result	Opposition Result	Opposition Result
Li Shujin	55 kg	Rajender Kumar (IND); W PP 3–1	Kanybek Zholchubekov (KGZ); L PO 0–3	Repechage Round 1 match: Ildar Hafizov (UZB); W P0 3–0	Bronze medal match: Mohammed Abbas (IRQ); W PO 3–0 (bronze)
Xie Zhen	60 kg	Aziz Beishaliev (KGZ); W PO 3–0	Omid Norouzi (IRI); L PO 0–3	Repechage Round 1 match: Ryutaro Matsumoto (JPN); L PP 1–3	did not advance
Zheng Pan	66 kg	Tsutomu Fujimura (JPN); L PO 0–3	did not advance		
Chang Yongxiang	74 kg	Musaab Al-Nakadli (SYR); W PO 3–0	Park Jin-Sung (KOR); L PP 1–3	did not advance	
Ma Sanyi	84 kg	Lee Se-Yeol (KOR); L PO 0–3		Repechage Round 1 match: Jakhongir Muminov (UZB); W P0 3–0	Bronze medal match: Alkhazur Ozdiyev (KAZ); L PP 1–3
Zhai Ningchao	96 kg	Babak Ghorbani (IRI); L PP 1–3	did not advance		
Liu Deli	120 kg	BYE	Hani Al-Marafy (JOR); W PO 3–0	Murodjon Tuychiev (TJK); W PO 3–0	Nurmakhan Tinaliyev (KAZ); L PO 0–3 (silver)

=== Women ===
Freestyle

Athlete	Event	Round of 32	Round of 16	Quarterfinals	Semifinals	Final
Athlete	Event	Opposition Result	Opposition Result	Opposition Result	Opposition Result	Opposition Result
Zhao Shasha	48 kg	BYE	Hitomi Sakamoto (JPN); L VT 0–5	did not advance		
Zhang Lan	55 kg	BYE	Darunee Orain (THA); W PO 3–0	Aiyim Abdildina (KAZ); W PP 3–1	Saori Yoshida (JPN); L PO 0–3 (silver)	
Chen Meng	63 kg	Ochirbatyn Nasanburmaa (MGL); L PP 1–3		Repechage Round 1 match: Mio Nishimaki (JPN); W VT 5–0	Bronze medal match: Suman Kundu (IND); W VT 5–0 (bronze)	
Li Dan	72 kg		Bae Mi-Kyung (KOR); W PO 3–0	Kyoko Hamaguchi (JPN); W VT 5–0	Gelegjamtsyn Naranchimeg (MGL); L PP 1–3 (silver)	

== Wushu ==
=== Men ===
Changquan

Athlete	Event	Changquan		Total	
Athlete	Event	Result	Rank	Result	Rank
Yuan Xiaochao	Changquan	9.78	1st place, gold medalist(s)		

Nanquan\Nangun

Athlete	Event	Nanquan		Nangun		Total	
Athlete	Event	Result	Rank	Result	Rank	Result	Rank
Huang Guangyuan	Nanquan\Nangun All-Round	9.87	1st	9.86	1st	19.73	1st place, gold medalist(s)

Taijiquan\Taijijian

Athlete	Event	Taijijian		Taijiquan		Total	
Athlete	Event	Result	Rank	Result	Rank	Result	Rank
Wu Yanan	Taijiquan\Taijijian All-Round	9.90	1st	9.90	1st	19.80	1st place, gold medalist(s)

Sanshou

Athlete	Event	Round of 16	Quarterfinals	Semifinals	Final
Athlete	Event	Opposition Result	Opposition Result	Opposition Result	Opposition Result
Li Xinjie	56 kg	Wong Ting Hong (HKG); W PTS 2–0	Lim Seung-Chang (KOR); W PTS 2–0	Khwanyuen Chanthra (IND); W PTS 2–0	Phan Van Hau (VIE); W PTS 2–0 (gold)
Zhang Junyong	65 kg	Narong Thongchai (THA); W PTS 2–0	Kurbangeldi Atageldiyev (TKM); W PTS 2–0	Mark Eddiva (PHI); W PTS 2–0	Nguyen Van Tuan (VIE); W PTS 2–0 (gold)
Zhang Yong	70 kg	Eduard Folayang (PHI); W PTS 2–0	Yoo Sang-Hoon (KOR); W PTS 2–0	Sajjad Abbasi (IRI); W PTS 2–0	Cai Liang Chan (MAC); W PTS 2–0 (gold)
Jiang Chunpeng	75 kg	BYE	Yoo Sang-Hoon (KOR); W PTS 1–0	Hamid Reza Gholipour (IRI); L PTS 1–2 (bronze)	did not advance

=== Women ===
Nanquan\Nangun

Athlete	Event	Nanquan		Nangun		Total	
Athlete	Event	Result	Rank	Result	Rank	Result	Rank
Lin Fan	Nanquan\Nangun All-Round	9.90	1st	9.90	1st	19.80	1st place, gold medalist(s)

Jianshu\Qiangshu

Athlete	Event	Jianshu		Qiangshu		Total	
Athlete	Event	Result	Rank	Result	Rank	Result	Rank
Lin Fan	Jianshu\Qiangshu All-Round	9.90	1st	9.80	1st	19.70	1st place, gold medalist(s)

Sanshou

Athlete	Event	Round of 16	Quarterfinals	Semifinals	Final
Athlete	Event	Opposition Result	Opposition Result	Opposition Result	Opposition Result
E Meidie	56 kg	BYE	Sanathoi Devi (IND); W PTS 2–0	Lee Jung-Hee (KOR); W PTS 2–0	Nguyen Thi Bich (VIE); W PTS 2–0 (gold)
