= Tennis at the 2010 Asian Games – Men's team =

Men's team at the 2010 Asian Games
- Venue: Aoti Tennis Centre
- Dates: 13–16 October 2010
- Competitors: 62 from 18 nations

Medalists
gold medal	Chinese Taipei; Chen Ti, Lu Yen-hsun, Yang Tsung-hua, Yi Chu-huan
silver medal	Uzbekistan; Farrukh Dustov, Murad Inoyatov, Denis Istomin, Vaja Uzakov
bronze medal	India; Somdev Devvarman, Karan Rastogi, Sanam Singh, Vishnu Vardhan
bronze medal	Japan; Tatsuma Ito, Toshihide Matsui, Go Soeda, Takao Suzuki

Men's team
- Tennis at the 2010 Asian Games

Events
Singles	men	women
Doubles	men	women	mixed
Team	men	women
- Asian Games

The Men's team tennis competition at the 2010 Asian Games saw South Korea try to defend the title but lost in the quarterfinals to Uzbekistan. Each tie consists of two singles and one doubles match.

== Schedule ==
All times are China Standard Time (UTC+08:00)

Date	Time	Event
Saturday, 13 November 2010	10:00	1st round
Saturday, 13 November 2010	14:00	2nd round
Sunday, 14 November 2010	10:00	Quarterfinals
Monday, 15 November 2010	10:00	Semifinals
Tuesday, 16 November 2010	10:00	Final

== Results ==
=== Bracket ===
==== Final ====
Final
1	Chinese Taipei	2
3	Uzbekistan	1

==== Top half ====
1st round
Kyrgyzstan	2
Turkmenistan	1
Sri Lanka	2
Saudi Arabia	0

2nd round
1	Chinese Taipei	3
Cambodia	0
Kyrgyzstan	0
8	Philippines	3
4	India	3
Qatar	0
Sri Lanka	0
7	Thailand	3

Quarterfinals
1	Chinese Taipei	2
8	Philippines	1
4	India	2
7	Thailand	1

Semifinals
1	Chinese Taipei	2
4	India	1

==== Bottom half ====
1st round

2nd round
6	South Korea	3
Mongolia	0
Vietnam	0
3	Uzbekistan	3
5	China	3
Nepal	0
Hong Kong	0
2	Japan	3

Quarterfinals
6	South Korea	0
3	Uzbekistan	3
5	China	1
2	Japan	2

Semifinals
3	Uzbekistan	2
2	Japan	1

=== 1st round ===
13 November	Kyrgyzstan	2–1	Turkmenistan

Daniiar Duldaev	2–0	Jamşid Ilmuradow	6–3, 6–4
Georgii Kotliarevskii	0–2	Mälikkuli Mamedkuliýew	0–6, 0–6
Daniiar Duldaev / Georgii Kotliarevskii	2–1	Jamşid Ilmuradow / Mälikkuli Mamedkuliýew	4–6, 6–2, 6–4

13 November	Sri Lanka	2–0	Saudi Arabia

Harshana Godamanna	2–0	Omar Al-Thagib	6–0, 6–3
Vimuktha de Alwis	2–0	Fahad Al-Saad	7–5, 6–2

=== 2nd round ===
13 November	Chinese Taipei	3–0	Cambodia

Chen Ti	2–0	Orn Sambath	6–1, 6–0
Yang Tsung-hua	2–0	Bun Kenny	6–1, 6–4
Yang Tsung-hua / Yi Chu-huan	2–0	Bun Kenny / Orn Sambath	6–0, 6–0

13 November	Kyrgyzstan	0–3	Philippines

Georgii Kotliarevskii	0–2	Treat Huey	0–6, 1–6
Daniiar Duldaev	0–2	Cecil Mamiit	4–6, 4–6
Daniiar Duldaev / Georgii Kotliarevskii	0–2	Johnny Arcilla / Ruben Gonzales	1–6, 2–6

13 November	India	3–0	Qatar

Karan Rastogi	2–0	Jabor Al-Mutawa	6–1, 6–1
Somdev Devvarman	2–0	Mousa Al-Harrasi	6–0, 6–1
Sanam Singh / Somdev Devvarman	2–0	Mubarak Al-Harrasi / Abdulrahman Al-Hareth	6–0, 6–1

13 November	Sri Lanka	0–3	Thailand

Thangarajah Dineshkanthan	0–2	Kittipong Wachiramanowong	4–6, 4–6
Harshana Godamanna	0–2	Danai Udomchoke	4–6, 4–6
Thangarajah Dineshkanthan / Vimuktha de Alwis	0–2	Sanchai Ratiwatana / Sonchat Ratiwatana	1–6, 0–6

13 November	South Korea	3–0	Mongolia

Cho Soong-jae	2–0	Mönkhbaataryn Badrakh	6–1, 6–3
Kim Young-jun	2–0	Düürenbayaryn Erdenebayar	6–3, 6–0
Kim Hyun-joon / Seol Jae-min	2–0	Baataryn Oyuunbat / Mönkhbaataryn Badrakh	6–1, 6–3

13 November	Vietnam	0–3	Uzbekistan

Đỗ Minh Quân	0–2	Murad Inoyatov	2–6, 2–6
Nguyễn Hoàng Thiên	0–2	Denis Istomin	0–6, 2–6
Đỗ Minh Quân / Lê Quốc Khánh	0–2	Vaja Uzakov / Murad Inoyatov	6–7^{(5–7)}, 3–6

13 November	China	3–0	Nepal

Wu Di	2–0	Jitendra Pariyar	6–0, 6–0
Zhang Ze	2–0	Kumar Adhikari	6–0, 6–0
Gong Maoxin / Li Zhe	2–0	Kumar Adhikari / Jitendra Pariyar	6–1, 6–2

13 November	Hong Kong	0–3	Japan

Martin Sayer	1–2	Tatsuma Ito	4–6, 6–3, 5–7
Yu Hiu Tung	0–2	Go Soeda	0–6, 1–6
Michael Lai / Jack Hui	0–2	Toshihide Matsui / Takao Suzuki	2–6, 4–6

=== Quarterfinals ===
14 November	Chinese Taipei	2–1	Philippines

Yang Tsung-hua	2–0	Treat Huey	7–6^{(7–5)}, 7–5
Lu Yen-hsun	2–0	Cecil Mamiit	6–2, 7–6^{(7–3)}
Chen Ti / Yi Chu-huan	0–2	Johnny Arcilla / Ruben Gonzales	4–6, 4–6

14 November	India	2–1	Thailand

Sanam Singh	2–0	Kittipong Wachiramanowong	6–1, 6–4
Somdev Devvarman	2–0	Danai Udomchoke	7–5, 7–5
Karan Rastogi / Vishnu Vardhan	1–2	Sanchai Ratiwatana / Sonchat Ratiwatana	6–3, 3–6, 2–6

14 November	South Korea	0–3	Uzbekistan

Kim Hyun-joon	1–2	Murad Inoyatov	4–6, 6–1, 2–6
Kim Young-jun	1–2	Denis Istomin	3–6, 6–3, 3–6
Cho Soong-jae / Seol Jae-min	0–2	Murad Inoyatov / Denis Istomin	3–6, 2–6

14 November	China	1–2	Japan

Wu Di	2–0	Tatsuma Ito	6–3, 6–1
Zhang Ze	0–2	Go Soeda	6–7^{(5–7)}, 3–6
Gong Maoxin / Li Zhe	1–2	Toshihide Matsui / Takao Suzuki	6–7^{(4–7)}, 7–6^{(7–1)}, 2–6

=== Semifinals ===
15 November	Chinese Taipei	2–1	India

Yang Tsung-hua	2–1	Sanam Singh	6–7^{(3–7)}, 6–2, 7–6^{(7–5)}
Chen Ti	0–2	Somdev Devvarman	2–6, 6–7^{(4–7)}
Yang Tsung-hua / Yi Chu-huan	2–0	Sanam Singh / Somdev Devvarman	6–4, 7–6^{(7–1)}

15 November	Uzbekistan	2–1	Japan

Murad Inoyatov	0–2	Tatsuma Ito	3–6, 4–6
Denis Istomin	2–1	Go Soeda	6–7^{(5–7)}, 7–6^{(7–3)}, 6–0
Murad Inoyatov / Denis Istomin	2–0	Toshihide Matsui / Takao Suzuki	6–4, 7–6^{(8–6)}

=== Final ===
16 November	Chinese Taipei	2–1	Uzbekistan

Chen Ti	2–0	Murad Inoyatov	6–2, 6–4
Yang Tsung-hua	0–2	Denis Istomin	4–6, 0–6
Yang Tsung-hua / Yi Chu-huan	2–0	Murad Inoyatov / Denis Istomin	6–3, 6–4

== Non-participating athletes ==
- Zaki Al-Abdullah (KSA)
- Abdulmalek Burasais (KSA)
- Sandagiin Angarag (MGL)
- Farrukh Dustov (UZB)
