= Tennis at the 2010 Asian Games – Men's singles =

Men's singles at the 2010 Asian Games
- Venue: Aoti Tennis Centre
- Dates: 17–23 October 2010
- Competitors: 39 from 21 nations

Medalists
gold medal	Somdev Devvarman	India
silver medal	Denis Istomin	Uzbekistan
bronze medal	Go Soeda	Japan
bronze medal	Tatsuma Ito	Japan

Men's singles
- Tennis at the 2010 Asian Games

Events
Singles	men	women
Doubles	men	women	mixed
Team	men	women
Asian Games

Danai Udomchoke was the defending champion but lost to Tatsuma Ito in the quarterfinals.
Somdev Devvarman defeated Denis Istomin in the final 6–1, 6–2.

== Schedule ==
All times are China Standard Time (UTC+08:00)

Date	Time	Event
Wednesday, 17 November 2010	10:00	1st round
Friday, 19 November 2010	10:00	2nd round
Saturday, 20 November 2010	10:00	3rd round
Sunday, 21 November 2010	11:00	Quarterfinals
Monday, 22 November 2010	11:00	Semifinals
Tuesday, 23 November 2010	13:00	Final

== Results ==
=== Finals ===
Semifinals					Final
1	Denis Istomin (UZB)	6	6
3	Go Soeda (JPN)	1	0		1	Denis Istomin (UZB)	1	2
4	Tatsuma Ito (JPN)	2	6	3	2	Somdev Devvarman (IND)	6	6
2	Somdev Devvarman (IND)	6	0	6

=== Top half ===
==== Section 1 ====
1st round
Jitendra Pariyar (NEP)	1	1
Đỗ Minh Quân (VIE)	6	6

2nd round
1	Denis Istomin (UZB)	6	6
Đỗ Minh Quân (VIE)	0	2
Mönkhbaataryn Badrakh (MGL)	1	1
13	Jeong Suk-young (KOR)	6	6
10	Chen Ti (TPE)	6	6
Mousa Al-Harrasi (QAT)	0	0
Mälikkuli Mamedkuliýew (TKM)	0	0
7	Karan Rastogi (IND)	6	6

3rd round
1	Denis Istomin (UZB)	6	6
13	Jeong Suk-young (KOR)	3	4
10	Chen Ti (TPE)	0	4
7	Karan Rastogi (IND)	6	6

Quarterfinals
1	Denis Istomin (UZB)	6	4	7
7	Karan Rastogi (IND)	2	6	5

==== Section 2 ====
1st round
Bun Kenny (CAM)	3	4
Aqeel Khan (PAK)	6	6
Harshana Godamanna (SRI)	6	6
Fahad Al-Saad (KSA)	2	0

2nd round
3	Go Soeda (JPN)	6	6
Aqeel Khan (PAK)	2	4
Martin Sayer (HKG)	5	5
14	Cecil Mamiit (PHI)	7	7
11	Kittipong Wachiramanowong (THA)	6	6
Daniiar Duldaev (KGZ)	2	2
Harshana Godamanna (SRI)	2	2
8	Wu Di (CHN)	6	6

3rd round
3	Go Soeda (JPN)	4	6	6
14	Cecil Mamiit (PHI)	6	4	3
11	Kittipong Wachiramanowong (THA)	3	6^{8}
8	Wu Di (CHN)	6	7^{10}

Quarterfinals
3	Go Soeda (JPN)	6	6
8	Wu Di (CHN)	2	3

=== Bottom half ===
==== Section 3 ====
1st round
Mohammed Al-Nabhani (OMA)	6	3	2
Nguyễn Hoàng Thiên (VIE)	0	6	6
Jamşid Ilmuradow (TKM)	2	2
Thangarajah Dineshkanthan (SRI)	6	6

2nd round
5	Yang Tsung-hua (TPE)	6	6
Nguyễn Hoàng Thiên (VIE)	3	3
Yu Hiu Tung (HKG)	3	2
9	Danai Udomchoke (THA)	6	6
15	Treat Huey (PHI)	6	6
Kumar Adhikari (NEP)	0	1
Thangarajah Dineshkanthan (SRI)	2	2
4	Tatsuma Ito (JPN)	6	6

3rd round
5	Yang Tsung-hua (TPE)	5	5
9	Danai Udomchoke (THA)	7	7
15	Treat Huey (PHI)	4	4
4	Tatsuma Ito (JPN)	6	6

Quarterfinals
9	Danai Udomchoke (THA)	4	1
4	Tatsuma Ito (JPN)	6	6

==== Section 4 ====
1st round
Düürenbayaryn Erdenebayar (MGL)	7^{7}	4	6^{7}
Omar Al-Thagib (KSA)	6^{2}	6	7^{9}
Jabor Al-Mutawa (QAT)	7	6
Orn Sambath (CAM)	5	0

2nd round
6	Zhang Ze (CHN)	6	6
Omar Al-Thagib (KSA)	0	0
Akhmadzhon Mukhamad (TJK)	2	4
12	Cho Soong-jae (KOR)	6	6
16	Vaja Uzakov (UZB)	3	6	6
Georgii Kotliarevskii (KGZ)	6	0	0
Jabor Al-Mutawa (QAT)	0	0
2	Somdev Devvarman (IND)	6	6

3rd round
6	Zhang Ze (CHN)	6	6
12	Cho Soong-jae (KOR)	4	4
16	Vaja Uzakov (UZB)	1	1
2	Somdev Devvarman (IND)	6	6

Quarterfinals
6	Zhang Ze (CHN)	4	4
2	Somdev Devvarman (IND)	6	6
