= Tennis at the 2010 Asian Games – Men's doubles =

Men's doubles at the 2010 Asian Games
- Venue: Aoti Tennis Centre
- Dates: 17–22 October 2010
- Competitors: 52 from 16 nations

Medalists
gold medal	Somdev Devvarman; Sanam Singh	India
silver medal	Gong Maoxin; Li Zhe	China
bronze medal	Cho Soong-jae; Kim Hyun-joon	South Korea
bronze medal	Yi Chu-huan; Lee Hsin-han	Chinese Taipei

Men's doubles
- Tennis at the 2010 Asian Games

Events
Singles	men	women
Doubles	men	women	mixed
Team	men	women
- Asian Games

At the 2010 Asian Games in the men's doubles tennis event, Mahesh Bhupathi and Leander Paes did not defend the title as they were both involved in the season-ending Tour Finals. In the final, Somdev Devvarman and Sanam Singh defeated Gong Maoxin and Li Zhe 6–3, 6–7(4), [10–8].

Tie-breaks were used for the first two sets of each match, which was the best of three sets. If the score was tied at one set all, a 'super tie-break' (the first pairing to win at least 10 points by a margin of two points) would be used.

== Schedule ==
All times are China Standard Time (UTC+08:00)

Date	Time	Event
Wednesday, 17 November 2010	10:00	1st round
Friday, 19 November 2010	12:00	2nd round
Saturday, 20 November 2010	11:30	Quarterfinals
Sunday, 21 November 2010	10:00	Semifinals
Monday, 22 November 2010	14:45	Final

== Results ==
Legend

- WO — Won by walkover

=== Final ===
Final
6	Somdev Devvarman (IND); Sanam Singh (IND)	6	6^{4}	[10]
2	Gong Maoxin (CHN); Li Zhe (CHN)	3	7^{7}	[8]

=== Top half ===
1st round
Huang Liang-chi (TPE); Chen Ti (TPE)	6	6
Baataryn Oyuunbat (MGL); Mönkhbaataryn Badrakh (MGL)	2	0
Kumar Adhikari (NEP); Jitendra Pariyar (NEP)	6	3	[3]
Abdulrahman Al-Hareth (QAT); Mubarak Al-Harrasi (QAT)	3	6	[10]
Cho Soong-jae (KOR); Kim Hyun-joon (KOR)	6	3	[10]
7	Toshihide Matsui (JPN); Takao Suzuki (JPN)	3	6	[7]
Bai Yan (CHN); Zhang Ze (CHN)	6	6
Vimuktha de Alwis (SRI); Thangarajah Dineshkanthan (SRI)	0	3
Fahad Al-Saad (KSA); Omar Al-Thagib (KSA)	1	1
Johnny Arcilla (PHI); Ruben Gonzales (PHI)	6	6

2nd round
1	Sanchai Ratiwatana (THA); Sonchat Ratiwatana (THA)	6	5	[9]
Huang Liang-chi (TPE); Chen Ti (TPE)	4	7	[11]
Abdulrahman Al-Hareth (QAT); Mubarak Al-Harrasi (QAT)	0	0
Cho Soong-jae (KOR); Kim Hyun-joon (KOR)	6	6
4	Murad Inoyatov (UZB); Denis Istomin (UZB)	2	3
Bai Yan (CHN); Zhang Ze (CHN)	6	6
Johnny Arcilla (PHI); Ruben Gonzales (PHI)	4	2
6	Somdev Devvarman (IND); Sanam Singh (IND)	6	6

Quarterfinals
Huang Liang-chi (TPE); Chen Ti (TPE)	2	7^{7}	[10]
Cho Soong-jae (KOR); Kim Hyun-joon (KOR)	6	6^{4}	[12]
Bai Yan (CHN); Zhang Ze (CHN)	2	4
6	Somdev Devvarman (IND); Sanam Singh (IND)	6	6

Semifinals
Cho Soong-jae (KOR); Kim Hyun-joon (KOR)	3	5
6	Somdev Devvarman (IND); Sanam Singh (IND)	6	7

=== Bottom half ===
1st round
Düürenbayaryn Erdenebayar (MGL); Sandagiin Angarag (MGL)
Treat Huey (PHI); Cecil Mamiit (PHI)	W	O
Abdulmalek Burasais (KSA); Zaki Al-Abdullah (KSA)	1	4
Bun Kenny (CAM); Orn Sambath (CAM)	6	6
8	Weerapat Doakmaiklee (THA); Kittipong Wachiramanowong (THA)	1	4
Kim Young-jun (KOR); Seol Jae-min (KOR)	6	6
Jack Hui (HKG); Michael Lai (HKG)	1	3
Karan Rastogi (IND); Vishnu Vardhan (IND)	6	6
Lê Quốc Khánh (VIE); Nguyễn Hoàng Thiên (VIE)	6	6
Jabor Al-Mutawa (QAT); Mousa Al-Harrasi (QAT)	2	3

2nd round
5	Hiroki Kondo (JPN); Go Soeda (JPN)	6	6^{0}	[6]
Treat Huey (PHI); Cecil Mamiit (PHI)	4	7^{7}	[10]
Bun Kenny (CAM); Orn Sambath (CAM)	1	1
3	Yi Chu-huan (TPE); Lee Hsin-han (TPE)	6	6
Kim Young-jun (KOR); Seol Jae-min (KOR)	1	6	[10]
Karan Rastogi (IND); Vishnu Vardhan (IND)	6	3	[2]
Lê Quốc Khánh (VIE); Nguyễn Hoàng Thiên (VIE)	2	0
2	Gong Maoxin (CHN); Li Zhe (CHN)	6	6

Quarterfinals
Treat Huey (PHI); Cecil Mamiit (PHI)	6^{1}	4
3	Yi Chu-huan (TPE); Lee Hsin-han (TPE)	7^{7}	6
Kim Young-jun (KOR); Seol Jae-min (KOR)	3	6	[6]
2	Gong Maoxin (CHN); Li Zhe (CHN)	6	3	[10]

Semifinals
3	Yi Chu-huan (TPE); Lee Hsin-han (TPE)	4	6^{3}
2	Gong Maoxin (CHN); Li Zhe (CHN)	6	7^{7}
