= Tennis at the 2010 Asian Games – Mixed doubles =

Mixed doubles at the 2010 Asian Games
- Venue: Aoti Tennis Centre
- Dates: 18–22 October 2010
- Competitors: 44 from 12 nations

Medalists
| gold medal | Yang Tsung-hua; Latisha Chan | Chinese Taipei |
| silver medal | Vishnu Vardhan; Sania Mirza | India |
| bronze medal | Sanchai Ratiwatana; Tamarine Tanasugarn | Thailand |
| bronze medal | Hiroki Kondo; Yurika Sema | Japan |

Mixed doubles
- Tennis at the 2010 Asian Games

Events
| Singles | men | women |
| Doubles | men | women | mixed |
| Team | men | women |
- Asian Games

At the 2010 Asian Games in the Mixed doubles tennis event, Sania Mirza and Leander Paes were the defending champions, but only Mirza participated, as Paes was involved in the Tour Finals. Mirza partnered up with Vishnu Vardhan. They went on to win the silver medal after losing to Latisha Chan and Yang Tsung-hua in the final 6–4, 1–6, [2–10].

Tie-breaks were used for the first two sets of each match, which was the best of three sets. If the score was tied at one set all, a 'super tie-break' (the first pairing to win at least 10 points by a margin of two points) would be used.

== Schedule ==
All times are China Standard Time (UTC+08:00)

| Date | Time | Event |
|---|---|---|
| Thursday, 18 November 2010 | 13:00 | 1st round |
| Friday, 19 November 2010 | 16:30 | 2nd round |
| Saturday, 20 November 2010 | 14:30 | Quarterfinals |
| Sunday, 21 November 2010 | 13:30 | Semifinals |
| Monday, 22 November 2010 | 15:30 | Final |

== Results ==
Legend

- WO — Won by walkover

=== Final ===
| Final |
| 6 | Vishnu Vardhan (IND); Sania Mirza (IND) | 6 | 1 | [2] |
| 2 | Yang Tsung-hua (TPE); Latisha Chan (TPE) | 4 | 6 | [10] |

=== Top half ===
1st round
Mohammed Al-Nabhani (OMA); Fatma Al-Nabhani (OMA) | 2 | 1
Murad Inoyatov (UZB); Albina Khabibulina (UZB) | 6 | 6
Kim Young-jun (KOR); Kim So-jung (KOR) | 6 | 6
Mälikkuli Mamedkuliýew (TKM); Anastasiýa Prenko (TKM) | 0 | 3
Bai Yan (CHN); Sun Shengnan (CHN) | 6 | 6
Lê Quốc Khánh (VIE); Huỳnh Phương Đài Trang (VIE) | 2 | 3

2nd round
1 | Sanchai Ratiwatana (THA); Tamarine Tanasugarn (THA) | 6 | 3 | [10]
Murad Inoyatov (UZB); Albina Khabibulina (UZB) | 4 | 6 | [6]
Martin Sayer (HKG); Zhang Ling (HKG) | 4 | 4
8 | Takao Suzuki (JPN); Misaki Doi (JPN) | 6 | 6
4 | Yi Chu-huan (TPE); Chuang Chia-jung (TPE) | 6 | 6
Kim Young-jun (KOR); Kim So-jung (KOR) | 4 | 4
Bai Yan (CHN); Sun Shengnan (CHN) | 3 | 6 | [10]
6 | Vishnu Vardhan (IND); Sania Mirza (IND) | 6 | 4 | [12]

Quarterfinals
1 | Sanchai Ratiwatana (THA); Tamarine Tanasugarn (THA) | 6 | 6
8 | Takao Suzuki (JPN); Misaki Doi (JPN) | 4 | 4
4 | Yi Chu-huan (TPE); Chuang Chia-jung (TPE) | 6 | 4 | [4]
6 | Vishnu Vardhan (IND); Sania Mirza (IND) | 2 | 6 | [10]

Semifinals
1 | Sanchai Ratiwatana (THA); Tamarine Tanasugarn (THA) | 3 | 7^{7} | [5]
6 | Vishnu Vardhan (IND); Sania Mirza (IND) | 6 | 6^{3} | [10]

=== Bottom half ===
1st round
Vaja Uzakov (UZB); Nigina Abduraimova (UZB) | 5 | 3
Sanam Singh (IND); Rushmi Chakravarthi (IND) | 7 | 6
Jack Hui (HKG); Venise Chan (HKG) | 6 | 2 | [4]
Daniiar Duldaev (KGZ); Ksenia Palkina (KGZ) | 3 | 6 | [10]
Đỗ Minh Quân (VIE); Huỳnh Mai Huỳnh (VIE) | 6 | 6
Jamşid Ilmuradow (TKM); Gülnara Gabdullina (TKM) | 1 | 0

2nd round
7 | Hiroki Kondo (JPN); Yurika Sema (JPN) | 6 | 3 | [10]
Sanam Singh (IND); Rushmi Chakravarthi (IND) | 4 | 6 | [3]
Daniiar Duldaev (KGZ); Ksenia Palkina (KGZ) | 4 | 4
3 | Sonchat Ratiwatana (THA); Noppawan Lertcheewakarn (THA) | 6 | 6
5 | Gong Maoxin (CHN); Han Xinyun (CHN) | 6 | 3 | [10]
Kim Hyun-joon (KOR); Kim Na-ri (KOR) | 3 | 6 | [6]
Đỗ Minh Quân (VIE); Huỳnh Mai Huỳnh (VIE)
2 | Yang Tsung-hua (TPE); Latisha Chan (TPE) | W | O

Quarterfinals
7 | Hiroki Kondo (JPN); Yurika Sema (JPN) | 6 | 6
3 | Sonchat Ratiwatana (THA); Noppawan Lertcheewakarn (THA) | 4 | 4
5 | Gong Maoxin (CHN); Han Xinyun (CHN) | 3 | 2
2 | Yang Tsung-hua (TPE); Latisha Chan (TPE) | 6 | 6

Semifinals
7 | Hiroki Kondo (JPN); Yurika Sema (JPN) | 3 | 3
2 | Yang Tsung-hua (TPE); Latisha Chan (TPE) | 6 | 6
