= Tennis at the 2010 Asian Games =

- Venue: Aoti Tennis Centre
- Dates: 13–23 November 2010
- Competitors: 129 from 22 nations

Tennis competitions at the 2010 Asian Games in Guangzhou, China were held from November 13 to November 23 at the Guangdong Olympic Tennis Centre.

A total of 129 tennis players from 22 nations competed in tennis at the 2010 Asian Games, Chinese Taipei finished first at the medal table by winning three gold medals.

== Schedule ==
P	Preliminary rounds	¼	Quarterfinals	½	Semifinals	F	Final

Event↓/Date →	13th Sat	14th Sun	15th Mon	16th Tue	17th Wed	18th Thu	19th Fri	20th Sat	21st Sun	22nd Mon	23rd Tue
Men's singles					P		P	P	¼	½	F
Men's doubles					P		P	¼	½	F	
Men's team	P	¼	½	F							
Women's singles					P	P	P	¼	½		F
Women's doubles					P		P	¼	½	F	
Women's team	P	¼	½	F							
Mixed doubles						P	P	¼	½	F	

== Medalists ==
Event	Gold	Silver	Bronze
Men's singles	Somdev Devvarman; India	Denis Istomin; Uzbekistan	Go Soeda; Japan
Men's singles	Somdev Devvarman; India	Denis Istomin; Uzbekistan	Tatsuma Ito; Japan
Men's doubles	India; Somdev Devvarman; Sanam Singh	China; Gong Maoxin; Li Zhe	South Korea; Cho Soong-jae; Kim Hyun-joon
Men's doubles	India; Somdev Devvarman; Sanam Singh	China; Gong Maoxin; Li Zhe	Chinese Taipei; Yi Chu-huan; Lee Hsin-han
Men's team	Chinese Taipei; Chen Ti; Lu Yen-hsun; Yang Tsung-hua; Yi Chu-huan	Uzbekistan; Farrukh Dustov; Murad Inoyatov; Denis Istomin; Vaja Uzakov	India; Somdev Devvarman; Karan Rastogi; Sanam Singh; Vishnu Vardhan
Men's team	Chinese Taipei; Chen Ti; Lu Yen-hsun; Yang Tsung-hua; Yi Chu-huan	Uzbekistan; Farrukh Dustov; Murad Inoyatov; Denis Istomin; Vaja Uzakov	Japan; Tatsuma Ito; Toshihide Matsui; Go Soeda; Takao Suzuki
Women's singles	Peng Shuai; China	Akgul Amanmuradova; Uzbekistan	Kimiko Date-Krumm; Japan
Women's singles	Peng Shuai; China	Akgul Amanmuradova; Uzbekistan	Sania Mirza; India
Women's doubles	Chinese Taipei; Latisha Chan; Chuang Chia-jung	Chinese Taipei; Chang Kai-chen; Hsieh Su-wei	China; Peng Shuai; Yan Zi
Women's doubles	Chinese Taipei; Latisha Chan; Chuang Chia-jung	Chinese Taipei; Chang Kai-chen; Hsieh Su-wei	South Korea; Kim So-jung; Lee Jin-a
Women's team	China; Li Na; Peng Shuai; Yan Zi; Zhang Shuai	Chinese Taipei; Latisha Chan; Chang Kai-chen; Chuang Chia-jung; Hsieh Su-wei	Japan; Kimiko Date-Krumm; Misaki Doi; Ryoko Fuda; Ayumi Morita
Women's team	China; Li Na; Peng Shuai; Yan Zi; Zhang Shuai	Chinese Taipei; Latisha Chan; Chang Kai-chen; Chuang Chia-jung; Hsieh Su-wei	Thailand; Noppawan Lertcheewakarn; Nudnida Luangnam; Tamarine Tanasugarn; Varatchaya Wongteanchai
Mixed doubles	Chinese Taipei; Yang Tsung-hua; Latisha Chan	India; Vishnu Vardhan; Sania Mirza	Thailand; Sanchai Ratiwatana; Tamarine Tanasugarn
Mixed doubles	Chinese Taipei; Yang Tsung-hua; Latisha Chan	India; Vishnu Vardhan; Sania Mirza	Japan; Hiroki Kondo; Yurika Sema

== Medal table ==
Rank	Nation	Gold	Silver	Bronze	Total
1	Chinese Taipei (TPE)	3	2	1	6
2	India (IND)	2	1	2	5
3	China (CHN)	2	1	1	4
4	Uzbekistan (UZB)	0	3	0	3
5	Japan (JPN)	0	0	6	6
6	South Korea (KOR)	0	0	2	2
6	Thailand (THA)	0	0	2	2
Totals (7 entries)		7	7	14	28

== Participating nations ==
A total of 129 athletes from 22 nations competed in tennis at the 2010 Asian Games:

- Cambodia (2)
- China (11)
- Chinese Taipei (11)
- Hong Kong (6)
- India (9)
- Indonesia (4)
- Japan (10)
- Kyrgyzstan (6)
- Mongolia (7)
- Nepal (4)
- Oman (2)
- Pakistan (1)
- Philippines (4)
- Qatar (4)
- Saudi Arabia (4)
- South Korea (11)
- Sri Lanka (3)
- Tajikistan (1)
- Thailand (11)
- Turkmenistan (4)
- Uzbekistan (8)
- Vietnam (6)
