= Tennis at the 2010 Asian Games – Women's singles =

Women's singles at the 2010 Asian Games
- Venue: Aoti Tennis Centre
- Dates: 17–23 October 2010
- Competitors: 29 from 15 nations

Medalists
gold medal	Peng Shuai	China
silver medal	Akgul Amanmuradova	Uzbekistan
bronze medal	Kimiko Date-Krumm	Japan
bronze medal	Sania Mirza	India

Women's singles
- Tennis at the 2010 Asian Games

Events
Singles	men	women
Doubles	men	women	mixed
Team	men	women
Asian Games

At the 2010 Asian Games in the Women's singles tennis event, Zheng Jie was defending champion, but chose not to participate.

Peng Shuai defeated Akgul Amanmuradova in the final 7–5, 6–2.

== Schedule ==
All times are China Standard Time (UTC+08:00)

Date	Time	Event
Wednesday, 17 November 2010	10:00	1st round
Thursday, 18 November 2010	10:00	1st round
Friday, 19 November 2010	12:00	2nd round
Saturday, 20 November 2010	10:00	Quarterfinals
Sunday, 21 November 2010	11:00	Semifinals
Tuesday, 23 November 2010	13:00	Final

== Results ==
=== Final ===
Final
4	Peng Shuai (CHN)	7	6
3	Akgul Amanmuradova (UZB)	5	2

=== Top half ===
1st round
Zhang Ling (HKG)	6	6
Anastasiýa Prenko (TKM)	1	2
Trần Lam Anh (VIE)	1	1
Ayu Fani Damayanti (INA)	6	6
Gotovyn Dulguunjargal (MGL)	0	0
8	Lee Jin-a (KOR)	6	6
4	Peng Shuai (CHN)	6	6
Aslesha Lissanevitch (NEP)	0	0
Zhamilia Duisheeva (KGZ)	0	1
Fatma Al-Nabhani (OMA)	6	6
Sabina Sharipova (UZB)	3	7	6
Noppawan Lertcheewakarn (THA)	6	5	2
Poojashree Venkatesha (IND)	2	2
7	Chang Kai-chen (TPE)	6	6

2nd round
1	Kimiko Date-Krumm (JPN)	6	6
Zhang Ling (HKG)	3	3
Ayu Fani Damayanti (INA)	4	4
8	Lee Jin-a (KOR)	6	6
4	Peng Shuai (CHN)	6	6
Fatma Al-Nabhani (OMA)	1	2
Sabina Sharipova (UZB)	7	4	1
7	Chang Kai-chen (TPE)	5	6	6

Quarterfinals
1	Kimiko Date-Krumm (JPN)	7^{7}	7
8	Lee Jin-a (KOR)	6^{2}	5
4	Peng Shuai (CHN)	6	7^{7}
7	Chang Kai-chen (TPE)	2	6^{1}

Semifinals
1	Kimiko Date-Krumm (JPN)	6^{6}	6	2
4	Peng Shuai (CHN)	7^{8}	3	6

=== Bottom half ===
1st round
5	Ayumi Morita (JPN)	6	6
Ksenia Palkina (KGZ)	1	1
Hsu Wen-hsin (TPE)	6	6
Huỳnh Phương Đài Trang (VIE)	2	1
Lavinia Tananta (INA)	6	6
Ganbaataryn Namuu (MGL)	0	0
6	Zhang Shuai (CHN)	6	6
Malika Rana (NEP)	0	0
Venise Chan (HKG)	1	0
Sania Mirza (IND)	6	6
Lee So-ra (KOR)	6	6
Gülnara Gabdullina (TKM)	0	1

2nd round
5	Ayumi Morita (JPN)	6	6
Hsu Wen-hsin (TPE)	1	2
Lavinia Tananta (INA)	2	2
3	Akgul Amanmuradova (UZB)	6	6
6	Zhang Shuai (CHN)	2	2
Sania Mirza (IND)	6	6
Lee So-ra (KOR)	0	1
2	Tamarine Tanasugarn (THA)	6	6

Quarterfinals
5	Ayumi Morita (JPN)	2	6	2
3	Akgul Amanmuradova (UZB)	6	2	6
Sania Mirza (IND)	6	6
2	Tamarine Tanasugarn (THA)	2	3

Semifinals
3	Akgul Amanmuradova (UZB)	6^{7}	6	6
Sania Mirza (IND)	7^{9}	3	4
