= Wrestling at the 2010 Asian Games – Women's freestyle 63 kg =

Women's freestyle 63 kg at the 2010 Asian Games
- Venue: Huagong Gymnasium
- Date: 26 November 2010
- Competitors: 11 from 11 nations

Medalists
gold medal	Yelena Shalygina	Kazakhstan
silver medal	Ochirbatyn Nasanburmaa	Mongolia
bronze medal	Park Sang-eun	South Korea
bronze medal	Chen Meng	China

The women's freestyle 63 kilograms wrestling competition at the 2010 Asian Games in Guangzhou was held on 26 November 2010 at the Huagong Gymnasium.

This freestyle wrestling competition consisted of a single-elimination tournament, with a repechage used to determine the winner of two bronze medals. The two finalists faced off for gold and silver medals. Each wrestler who lost to one of the two finalists moved into the repechage, culminating in a pair of bronze medal matches featuring the semifinal losers each facing the remaining repechage opponent from their half of the bracket.

Each bout consisted of up to three rounds, lasting two minutes apiece. The wrestler who scored more points in each round was the winner of that rounds; the bout finished when one wrestler had won two rounds (and thus the match).

== Schedule ==
All times are China Standard Time (UTC+08:00)

Date	Time	Event
Friday, 26 November 2010	09:30	1/8 finals
Friday, 26 November 2010	09:30	Quarterfinals
Friday, 26 November 2010	09:30	Semifinals
Friday, 26 November 2010	16:00	Repechages
Friday, 26 November 2010	17:00	Finals

== Results ==
Legend

- F — Won by fall

=== Main bracket ===
1/8 finals
Suman Kundu (IND)	0	3	2
Lương Thị Quyên (VIE)	5	1	0
Chen Meng (CHN)	1	2
Ochirbatyn Nasanburmaa (MGL)	2	3
Mio Nishimaki (JPN)	3	5
Try Sothavy (CAM)	0	0

Quarterfinals
Gavhar Mirzaeva (UZB)	0	1
Park Sang-eun (KOR)	2	3
Yelena Shalygina (KAZ)	3^{F}
Wilaiwan Thongkam (THA)	0
Nestan Kiiazova (KGZ)	3	0	0
Suman Kundu (IND)	1	5	2
Ochirbatyn Nasanburmaa (MGL)	4^{F}
Mio Nishimaki (JPN)	0

Semifinals
Park Sang-eun (KOR)	0	1
Yelena Shalygina (KAZ)	3	1
Suman Kundu (IND)	0	0
Ochirbatyn Nasanburmaa (MGL)	1	6

Final
Yelena Shalygina (KAZ)	0	4^{F}
Ochirbatyn Nasanburmaa (MGL)	2	2

=== Repechage ===
Repechage round 1
Chen Meng (CHN)	4^{F}
Mio Nishimaki (JPN)	0

Bronze medals
Wilaiwan Thongkam (THA)	0
Park Sang-eun (KOR)	4^{F}
Chen Meng (CHN)	4^{F}
Suman Kundu (IND)	0

== Final standing ==
Rank	Athlete
1st place, gold medalist(s)	Yelena Shalygina (KAZ)
2nd place, silver medalist(s)	Ochirbatyn Nasanburmaa (MGL)
3rd place, bronze medalist(s)	Park Sang-eun (KOR)
3rd place, bronze medalist(s)	Chen Meng (CHN)
5	Wilaiwan Thongkam (THA)
5	Suman Kundu (IND)
7	Mio Nishimaki (JPN)
8	Lương Thị Quyên (VIE)
9	Nestan Kiiazova (KGZ)
10	Gavhar Mirzaeva (UZB)
11	Try Sothavy (CAM)
