= Tennis at the 2010 Asian Games – Women's team =

Women's team at the 2010 Asian Games
- Venue: Aoti Tennis Centre
- Dates: 13–16 October 2010
- Competitors: 48 from 14 nations

Medalists
gold medal	China; Li Na, Peng Shuai, Yan Zi, Zhang Shuai
silver medal	Chinese Taipei; Latisha Chan, Chang Kai-chen, Chuang Chia-jung, Hsieh Su-wei
bronze medal	Thailand; Noppawan Lertcheewakarn, Nudnida Luangnam, Tamarine Tanasugarn, Varatchaya Wongteanchai
bronze medal	Japan; Kimiko Date-Krumm, Misaki Doi, Ryoko Fuda, Ayumi Morita

Women's team
- Tennis at the 2010 Asian Games

Events
Singles	men	women
Doubles	men	women	mixed
Team	men	women
Asian Games

The Women's team tennis competition was held at the 2010 Asian Games. Chinese Taipei were the defending champions, but lost to China in the Final.

Each tie is the best of three rubbers, two singles and one doubles match.

== Schedule ==
All times are China Standard Time (UTC+08:00)

Date	Time	Event
Saturday, 13 November 2010	10:00	1st round
Sunday, 14 November 2010	10:00	Quarterfinals
Monday, 15 November 2010	10:00	Semifinals
Tuesday, 16 November 2010	10:00	Final

== Results ==
1st round
Kyrgyzstan	2
Hong Kong	1
4	Thailand	3
Turkmenistan	0
Indonesia	3
India	0
South Korea	1
Uzbekistan	2
Vietnam	0
3	Chinese Taipei	3
Mongolia	0
Nepal	3

Quarterfinals
1	China	3
Kyrgyzstan	0
4	Thailand	3
Indonesia	0
Uzbekistan	1
3	Chinese Taipei	2
Nepal	0
2	Japan	3

Semifinals
1	China	3
4	Thailand	0
3	Chinese Taipei	2
2	Japan	1

Final
1	China	2
3	Chinese Taipei	1

=== 1st round ===
13 November	Kyrgyzstan	2–1	Hong Kong

Ksenia Palkina	0–2	Zhang Ling	1–6, 4–6
Bermet Duvanaeva	2–1	Venise Chan	7–5, 1–6, 6–3
Bermet Duvanaeva / Ksenia Palkina	2–1	Venise Chan / Zhang Ling	6–2, 1–6, 6–3

13 November	Thailand	3–0	Turkmenistan

Noppawan Lertcheewakarn	2–0	Anastasiýa Prenko	6–3, 6–2
Nudnida Luangnam	2–0	Gülnara Gabdullina	6–0, 6–0
Tamarine Tanasugarn / Varatchaya Wongteanchai	2–0	Gülnara Gabdullina / Anastasiýa Prenko	Walkover

13 November	Indonesia	3–0	India

Lavinia Tananta	2–1	Poojashree Venkatesha	2–6, 7–5, 6–2
Ayu Fani Damayanti	2–0	Nirupama Sanjeev	6–1, 6–1
Yayuk Basuki / Jessy Rompies	2–0	Rushmi Chakravarthi / Nirupama Sanjeev	6–3, 6–1

13 November	South Korea	1–2	Uzbekistan

Lee Jin-a	0–2	Akgul Amanmuradova	4–6, 3–6
Lee Ye-ra	2–1	Sabina Sharipova	4–6, 6–2, 6–4
Kim So-jung / Lee Jin-a	0–2	Akgul Amanmuradova / Albina Khabibulina	4–6, 4–6

13 November	Vietnam	0–3	Chinese Taipei

Huỳnh Phương Đài Trang	0–2	Latisha Chan	1–6, 2–6
Trần Lam Anh	0–2	Chang Kai-chen	1–6, 1–6
Huỳnh Mai Huỳnh / Huỳnh Phương Đài Trang	0–2	Chuang Chia-jung / Hsieh Su-wei	0–6, 1–6

13 November	Mongolia	0–3	Nepal

Gotovyn Dulguunjargal	0–2	Malika Rana	3–6, 5–7
Ganbaataryn Namuu	1–2	Aslesha Lissanevitch	6–2, 3–6, 1–6
Erdenebilegiin Odsüren / Ganbaataryn Namuu	0–2	Aslesha Lissanevitch / Malika Rana	0–6, 0–6

=== Quarterfinals ===
14 November	China	3–0	Kyrgyzstan

Peng Shuai	2–0	Bermet Duvanaeva	6–1, 6–2
Li Na	2–0	Ksenia Palkina	6–0, 6–4
Zhang Shuai / Yan Zi	2–0	Bermet Duvanaeva / Ksenia Palkina	6–4, 6–2

14 November	Thailand	3–0	Indonesia

Noppawan Lertcheewakarn	2–0	Ayu Fani Damayanti	6–3, 6–1
Tamarine Tanasugarn	2–0	Lavinia Tananta	6–2, 7–5
Nudnida Luangnam / Varatchaya Wongteanchai	2–1	Yayuk Basuki / Jessy Rompies	6–3, 5–7, 7–5

14 November	Uzbekistan	1–2	Chinese Taipei

Nigina Abduraimova	1–2	Chang Kai-chen	4–6, 6–2, 2–6
Akgul Amanmuradova	2–1	Latisha Chan	2–6, 6–3, 6–2
Akgul Amanmuradova / Albina Khabibulina	0–2	Chuang Chia-jung / Hsieh Su-wei	3–6, 1–6

14 November	Nepal	0–3	Japan

Aslesha Lissanevitch	0–2	Ryoko Fuda	0–6, 0–6
Malika Rana	0–2	Misaki Doi	0–6, 0–6
Aslesha Lissanevitch / Malika Rana	0–2	Misaki Doi / Ryoko Fuda	0–6, 0–6

=== Semifinals ===
15 November	China	3–0	Thailand

Peng Shuai	2–0	Noppawan Lertcheewakarn	6–3, 6–2
Li Na	2–0	Tamarine Tanasugarn	6–2, 6–1
Zhang Shuai / Yan Zi	2–0	Nudnida Luangnam / Varatchaya Wongteanchai	6–2, 6–4

15 November	Chinese Taipei	2–1	Japan

Chang Kai-chen	2–1	Ayumi Morita	7–5, 3–6, 6–2
Latisha Chan	0–2	Kimiko Date-Krumm	1–6, 0–3, Retired
Chuang Chia-jung / Hsieh Su-wei	2–0	Ayumi Morita / Kimiko Date-Krumm	6–4, 6–1

=== Final ===
16 November	China	2–1	Chinese Taipei

Peng Shuai	2–0	Chang Kai-chen	6–3, 7–5
Li Na	2–0	Latisha Chan	6–1, 6–1
Zhang Shuai / Yan Zi	0–2	Chuang Chia-jung / Hsieh Su-wei	3–6, 2–6

== Non-participating athletes ==
- Sania Mirza (IND)
- Zhamilia Duisheeva (KGZ)
- Erika Tenizbaeva (KGZ)
- Yu Min-hwa (KOR)
