= Wrestling at the 2010 Asian Games =

- Venue: Huagong Gymnasium
- Dates: 21–26 November 2010
- Competitors: 233 from 28 nations

Wrestling was contested by men and women at the 2010 Asian Games in Guangzhou, China. Only men competed in Greco-Roman wrestling while both men and women contested for medals in freestyle wrestling. All competition were held from November 21 to 26 at Huagong Gymnasium.

== Schedule ==
| P | Preliminary rounds | F | Repechage & Finals |

| Event↓/Date → | 21st Sun | | 22nd Mon | | 23rd Tue | | 24th Wed | | 25th Thu | | 26th Fri | |
|---|---|---|---|---|---|---|---|---|---|---|---|---|
| Men's freestyle 55 kg | | | | | P | F | | | | | | |
| Men's freestyle 60 kg | | | | | P | F | | | | | | |
| Men's freestyle 66 kg | | | | | | | P | F | | | | |
| Men's freestyle 74 kg | | | | | | | P | F | | | | |
| Men's freestyle 84 kg | | | | | | | P | F | | | | |
| Men's freestyle 96 kg | | | | | | | | | P | F | | |
| Men's freestyle 120 kg | | | | | | | | | P | F | | |
| Men's Greco-Roman 55 kg | P | F | | | | | | | | | | |
| Men's Greco-Roman 60 kg | P | F | | | | | | | | | | |
| Men's Greco-Roman 66 kg | P | F | | | | | | | | | | |
| Men's Greco-Roman 74 kg | | | P | F | | | | | | | | |
| Men's Greco-Roman 84 kg | | | P | F | | | | | | | | |
| Men's Greco-Roman 96 kg | | | P | F | | | | | | | | |
| Men's Greco-Roman 120 kg | | | | | P | F | | | | | | |
| Women's freestyle 48 kg | | | | | | | | | P | F | | |
| Women's freestyle 55 kg | | | | | | | | | | | P | F |
| Women's freestyle 63 kg | | | | | | | | | | | P | F |
| Women's freestyle 72 kg | | | | | | | | | | | P | F |

== Medalists ==
=== Men's freestyle ===
| Event | Gold | Silver | Bronze |
|---|---|---|---|
| 55 kg | Dilshod Mansurov; Uzbekistan | Yang Kyong-il; North Korea | Yasuhiro Inaba; Japan |
| 55 kg | Dilshod Mansurov; Uzbekistan | Yang Kyong-il; North Korea | Kim Hyo-sub; South Korea |
| 60 kg | Ganzorigiin Mandakhnaran; Mongolia | Hiroyuki Oda; Japan | Gao Feng; China |
| 60 kg | Ganzorigiin Mandakhnaran; Mongolia | Hiroyuki Oda; Japan | Dauren Zhumagaziyev; Kazakhstan |
| 66 kg | Tatsuhiro Yonemitsu; Japan | Mehdi Taghavi; Iran | Yang Chun-song; North Korea |
| 66 kg | Tatsuhiro Yonemitsu; Japan | Mehdi Taghavi; Iran | Leonid Spiridonov; Kazakhstan |
| 74 kg | Sadegh Goudarzi; Iran | Kazuyuki Nagashima; Japan | Dorjvaanchigiin Gombodorj; Mongolia |
| 74 kg | Sadegh Goudarzi; Iran | Kazuyuki Nagashima; Japan | Lee Yun-seok; South Korea |
| 84 kg | Jamal Mirzaei; Iran | Lee Jae-sung; South Korea | Pürveegiin Ösökhbaatar; Mongolia |
| 84 kg | Jamal Mirzaei; Iran | Lee Jae-sung; South Korea | Yermek Baiduashov; Kazakhstan |
| 96 kg | Reza Yazdani; Iran | Kurban Kurbanov; Uzbekistan | Takao Isokawa; Japan |
| 96 kg | Reza Yazdani; Iran | Kurban Kurbanov; Uzbekistan | Mausam Khatri; India |
| 120 kg | Artur Taymazov; Uzbekistan | Jargalsaikhany Chuluunbat; Mongolia | Liang Lei; China |
| 120 kg | Artur Taymazov; Uzbekistan | Jargalsaikhany Chuluunbat; Mongolia | Fardin Masoumi; Iran |

=== Men's Greco-Roman ===
| Event | Gold | Silver | Bronze |
|---|---|---|---|
| 55 kg | Kohei Hasegawa; Japan | Kanybek Zholchubekov; Kyrgyzstan | Li Shujin; China |
| 55 kg | Kohei Hasegawa; Japan | Kanybek Zholchubekov; Kyrgyzstan | Marat Karishalov; Kazakhstan |
| 60 kg | Omid Norouzi; Iran | Jung Ji-hyun; South Korea | Ravinder Singh; India |
| 60 kg | Omid Norouzi; Iran | Jung Ji-hyun; South Korea | Ryutaro Matsumoto; Japan |
| 66 kg | Saeid Abdevali; Iran | Darkhan Bayakhmetov; Kazakhstan | Sunil Kumar Rana; India |
| 66 kg | Saeid Abdevali; Iran | Darkhan Bayakhmetov; Kazakhstan | Tsutomu Fujimura; Japan |
| 74 kg | Daniar Kobonov; Kyrgyzstan | Tsukasa Tsurumaki; Japan | Farshad Alizadeh; Iran |
| 74 kg | Daniar Kobonov; Kyrgyzstan | Tsukasa Tsurumaki; Japan | Park Jin-sung; South Korea |
| 84 kg | Taleb Nematpour; Iran | Lee Se-yeol; South Korea | Alkhazur Ozdiyev; Kazakhstan |
| 84 kg | Taleb Nematpour; Iran | Lee Se-yeol; South Korea | Janarbek Kenjeev; Kyrgyzstan |
| 96 kg | Babak Ghorbani; Iran | Asset Mambetov; Kazakhstan | An Chang-gun; South Korea |
| 96 kg | Babak Ghorbani; Iran | Asset Mambetov; Kazakhstan | Davyd Saldadze; Uzbekistan |
| 120 kg | Nurmakhan Tinaliyev; Kazakhstan | Liu Deli; China | Murodjon Tuychiev; Tajikistan |
| 120 kg | Nurmakhan Tinaliyev; Kazakhstan | Liu Deli; China | Ali Nadhim; Iraq |

=== Women's freestyle ===
| Event | Gold | Silver | Bronze |
|---|---|---|---|
| 48 kg | So Sim-hyang; North Korea | Nguyễn Thị Lụa; Vietnam | Hitomi Sakamoto; Japan |
| 48 kg | So Sim-hyang; North Korea | Nguyễn Thị Lụa; Vietnam | Kim Hyung-joo; South Korea |
| 55 kg | Saori Yoshida; Japan | Zhang Lan; China | Aiyim Abdildina; Kazakhstan |
| 55 kg | Saori Yoshida; Japan | Zhang Lan; China | Pak Yon-hui; North Korea |
| 63 kg | Yelena Shalygina; Kazakhstan | Ochirbatyn Nasanburmaa; Mongolia | Park Sang-eun; South Korea |
| 63 kg | Yelena Shalygina; Kazakhstan | Ochirbatyn Nasanburmaa; Mongolia | Chen Meng; China |
| 72 kg | Gelegjamtsyn Naranchimeg; Mongolia | Li Dan; China | Kyoko Hamaguchi; Japan |
| 72 kg | Gelegjamtsyn Naranchimeg; Mongolia | Li Dan; China | Guzel Manyurova; Kazakhstan |

== Medal table ==
| Rank | Nation | Gold | Silver | Bronze | Total |
|---|---|---|---|---|---|
| 1 | Iran (IRI) | 7 | 1 | 2 | 10 |
| 2 | Japan (JPN) | 3 | 3 | 6 | 12 |
| 3 | Kazakhstan (KAZ) | 2 | 2 | 7 | 11 |
| 4 | Mongolia (MGL) | 2 | 2 | 2 | 6 |
| 5 | Uzbekistan (UZB) | 2 | 1 | 1 | 4 |
| 6 | North Korea (PRK) | 1 | 1 | 2 | 4 |
| 7 | Kyrgyzstan (KGZ) | 1 | 1 | 1 | 3 |
| 8 | South Korea (KOR) | 0 | 3 | 6 | 9 |
| 9 | China (CHN) | 0 | 3 | 4 | 7 |
| 10 | Vietnam (VIE) | 0 | 1 | 0 | 1 |
| 11 | India (IND) | 0 | 0 | 3 | 3 |
| 12 | Iraq (IRQ) | 0 | 0 | 1 | 1 |
| 12 | Tajikistan (TJK) | 0 | 0 | 1 | 1 |
| Totals (13 entries) | | 18 | 18 | 36 | 72 |

== Participating nations ==
A total of 233 athletes from 28 nations competed in wrestling at the 2010 Asian Games:

- Afghanistan (4)
- Cambodia (4)
- China (17)
- India (17)
- Indonesia (4)
- Iran (14)
- Iraq (6)
- Japan (18)
- Jordan (2)
- Kazakhstan (18)
- Kyrgyzstan (17)
- Lebanon (2)
- Mongolia (11)
- Nepal (1)
- North Korea (9)
- Pakistan (3)
- Palestine (2)
- Philippines (4)
- Qatar (3)
- South Korea (18)
- Syria (8)
- Tajikistan (8)
- Thailand (5)
- Turkmenistan (11)
- United Arab Emirates (2)
- Uzbekistan (15)
- Vietnam (7)
- Yemen (3)
