= Tennis at the 2010 Asian Games – Women's doubles =

Women's doubles at the 2010 Asian Games
- Venue: Aoti Tennis Centre
- Dates: 17–22 October 2010
- Competitors: 40 from 12 nations

Medalists
gold medal	Latisha Chan; Chuang Chia-jung	Chinese Taipei
silver medal	Chang Kai-chen; Hsieh Su-wei	Chinese Taipei
bronze medal	Peng Shuai; Yan Zi	China
bronze medal	Kim So-jung; Lee Jin-a	South Korea

Women's doubles
- Tennis at the 2010 Asian Games

Events
Singles	men	women
Doubles	men	women	mixed
Team	men	women
Asian Games

At the 2010 Asian Games in the Women's doubles tennis event, Zheng Jie and Yan Zi were the defending champions, but only Yan chose to participate, and partnered up with Peng Shuai. They lost in the semifinals against Chang Kai-chen and Hsieh Su-wei, who lost the final to Latisha Chan and Chuang Chia-jung 7–5, 6–3.

Tie-breaks were used for the first two sets of each match, which was best of three sets. If the score was tied at one set all, a 'super tie-break' (the first pairing to win at least 10 points by a margin of two points) was used.

== Schedule ==
All times are China Standard Time (UTC+08:00)

Date	Time	Event
Wednesday, 17 November 2010	10:00	1st round
Friday, 19 November 2010	15:00	2nd round
Saturday, 20 November 2010	10:00	Quarterfinals
Sunday, 21 November 2010	10:00	Semifinals
Monday, 22 November 2010	11:00	Final

== Results ==
Legend

- r — Retired

=== Final ===
Final
1	Latisha Chan (TPE); Chuang Chia-jung (TPE)	7	6
3	Chang Kai-chen (TPE); Hsieh Su-wei (TPE)	5	3

=== Top half ===
1st round
Nigina Abduraimova (UZB); Sabina Sharipova (UZB)	6	6
Huỳnh Mai Huỳnh (VIE); Trần Lam Anh (VIE)	0	2
Erika Tenizbaeva (KGZ); Bermet Duvanaeva (KGZ)	0	r
Nudnida Luangnam (THA); Nicha Lertpitaksinchai (THA)	6

2nd round
1	Latisha Chan (TPE); Chuang Chia-jung (TPE)	6	6
Nigina Abduraimova (UZB); Sabina Sharipova (UZB)	1	3
Nirupama Sanjeev (IND); Tara Iyer (IND)	4	5
5	Sun Shengnan (CHN); Zhang Shuai (CHN)	6	7
4	Kimiko Date-Krumm (JPN); Ayumi Morita (JPN)	6	5	[10]
Nudnida Luangnam (THA); Nicha Lertpitaksinchai (THA)	0	7	[8]
Kim So-jung (KOR); Lee Jin-a (KOR)	6	6
8	Ayu Fani Damayanti (INA); Lavinia Tananta (INA)	1	1

Quarterfinals
1	Latisha Chan (TPE); Chuang Chia-jung (TPE)	6	6^{5}	[10]
5	Sun Shengnan (CHN); Zhang Shuai (CHN)	1	7^{7}	[6]
4	Kimiko Date-Krumm (JPN); Ayumi Morita (JPN)	6	6^{7}	[9]
Kim So-jung (KOR); Lee Jin-a (KOR)	3	7^{9}	[11]

Semifinals
1	Latisha Chan (TPE); Chuang Chia-jung (TPE)	6	3	[10]
Kim So-jung (KOR); Lee Jin-a (KOR)	1	6	[3]

=== Bottom half ===
1st round
Misaki Doi (JPN); Ryoko Fuda (JPN)	6	6
Rushmi Chakravarthi (IND); Poojashree Venkatesha (IND)	3	1
Ganbaataryn Namuu (MGL); Gotovyn Dulguunjargal (MGL)	0	0
Nungnadda Wannasuk (THA); Varatchaya Wongteanchai (THA)	6	6

2nd round
6	Jessy Rompies (INA); Yayuk Basuki (INA)	6	6
Kim Na-ri (KOR); Yu Min-hwa (KOR)	2	1
Misaki Doi (JPN); Ryoko Fuda (JPN)	7^{8}	4	[7]
3	Chang Kai-chen (TPE); Hsieh Su-wei (TPE)	6^{6}	6	[10]
7	Akgul Amanmuradova (UZB); Albina Khabibulina (UZB)	6	6
Aslesha Lissanevitch (NEP); Malika Rana (NEP)	0	0
Nungnadda Wannasuk (THA); Varatchaya Wongteanchai (THA)	3	2
2	Peng Shuai (CHN); Yan Zi (CHN)	6	6

Quarterfinals
6	Jessy Rompies (INA); Yayuk Basuki (INA)	4	4
3	Chang Kai-chen (TPE); Hsieh Su-wei (TPE)	6	6
7	Akgul Amanmuradova (UZB); Albina Khabibulina (UZB)	4	3
2	Peng Shuai (CHN); Yan Zi (CHN)	6	6

Semifinals
3	Chang Kai-chen (TPE); Hsieh Su-wei (TPE)	5	6	[11]
2	Peng Shuai (CHN); Yan Zi (CHN)	7	0	[9]
