= Wrestling at the 2010 Asian Games – Men's freestyle 74 kg =

Men's freestyle 74 kg at the 2010 Asian Games
- Venue: Huagong Gymnasium
- Date: 24 November 2010
- Competitors: 15 from 15 nations

Medalists
gold medal	Sadegh Goudarzi	Iran
silver medal	Kazuyuki Nagashima	Japan
bronze medal	Dorjvaanchigiin Gombodorj	Mongolia
bronze medal	Lee Yun-seok	South Korea

The men's freestyle 74 kilograms wrestling competition at the 2010 Asian Games in Guangzhou was held on 24 November 2010 at the Huagong Gymnasium.

This freestyle wrestling competition consisted of a single-elimination tournament, with a repechage used to determine the winner of two bronze medals. The two finalists faced off for gold and silver medals. Each wrestler who lost to one of the two finalists moved into the repechage, culminating in a pair of bronze medal matches featuring the semifinal losers each facing the remaining repechage opponent from their half of the bracket.

Each bout consisted of up to three rounds, lasting two minutes apiece. The wrestler who scored more points in each round was the winner of that rounds; the bout finished when one wrestler had won two rounds (and thus the match).

== Schedule ==
All times are China Standard Time (UTC+08:00)

Date	Time	Event
Wednesday, 24 November 2010	09:30	1/8 finals
Wednesday, 24 November 2010	09:30	Quarterfinals
Wednesday, 24 November 2010	09:30	Semifinals
Wednesday, 24 November 2010	16:00	Repechages
Wednesday, 24 November 2010	17:00	Finals

== Results ==
=== Main bracket ===
1/8 finals
Tahir Hanmamedow (TKM)	0	0
Mazen Kadmani (SYR)	1	2
Dorjvaanchigiin Gombodorj (MGL)	6	6
Mohamed Al-Qubaisi (UAE)	0	0
Husham Majeed (IRQ)	2	0
Narsingh Yadav (IND)	6	6
Ilgiz Dzhakypbekov (KGZ)	1	5
Jo Kum-chol (PRK)	0	3
Sadegh Goudarzi (IRI)	4	7
Fahriansyah (INA)	0	0
Lee Yun-seok (KOR)	2	2
Zhang Chongyao (CHN)	0	1
Rashid Kurbanov (UZB)	1	0	0
Seifaddin Osmanov (KAZ)	0	1	1

Quarterfinals
Kazuyuki Nagashima (JPN)	6	4
Mazen Kadmani (SYR)	0	0
Dorjvaanchigiin Gombodorj (MGL)	3	0	1
Narsingh Yadav (IND)	0	1	0
Ilgiz Dzhakypbekov (KGZ)	0	0
Sadegh Goudarzi (IRI)	3	4
Lee Yun-seok (KOR)	4	0	1
Seifaddin Osmanov (KAZ)	1	3	0

Semifinals
Kazuyuki Nagashima (JPN)	2	2	6
Dorjvaanchigiin Gombodorj (MGL)	3	0	2
Sadegh Goudarzi (IRI)	9	3
Lee Yun-seok (KOR)	2	0

Final
Kazuyuki Nagashima (JPN)	0	0
Sadegh Goudarzi (IRI)	1	3

=== Repechage ===
Repechage round 1
Fahriansyah (INA)	0	0
Ilgiz Dzhakypbekov (KGZ)	4	6

Bronze medals
Mazen Kadmani (SYR)	0	0
Dorjvaanchigiin Gombodorj (MGL)	6	6
Ilgiz Dzhakypbekov (KGZ)	0	1
Lee Yun-seok (KOR)	1	2

== Final standing ==
Rank	Athlete
1st place, gold medalist(s)	Sadegh Goudarzi (IRI)
2nd place, silver medalist(s)	Kazuyuki Nagashima (JPN)
3rd place, bronze medalist(s)	Dorjvaanchigiin Gombodorj (MGL)
3rd place, bronze medalist(s)	Lee Yun-seok (KOR)
5	Mazen Kadmani (SYR)
5	Ilgiz Dzhakypbekov (KGZ)
7	Narsingh Yadav (IND)
8	Seifaddin Osmanov (KAZ)
9	Jo Kum-chol (PRK)
10	Husham Majeed (IRQ)
11	Rashid Kurbanov (UZB)
12	Zhang Chongyao (CHN)
13	Tahir Hanmamedow (TKM)
14	Mohamed Al-Qubaisi (UAE)
15	Fahriansyah (INA)
