= Cambodia at the 2010 Asian Games =

- IOC code: CAM
- NOC: National Olympic Committee of Cambodia
- Website: www.noccambodia.org (in Khmer and English)

in Guangzhou
- Competitors: 22 in 8 sports
- Officials: 13
- Medals: Gold 0 Silver 0 Bronze 0 Total 0

Asian Games appearances (overview)
- 1954; 1958; 1962; 1966; 1970; 1974; 1978–1990; 1994; 1998; 2002; 2006; 2010; 2014; 2018; 2022; 2026

Cambodia participated at the 16th Asian Games in Guangzhou, China.

== Athletics ==
=== Men ===
Track and road events

Event	Athletes	Heats		Semifinal		Final	
Event	Athletes	Time	Rank	Time	Rank	Time	Rank
100 m	Churpveasna Sar	11.19 PB	5th	did not advance			
10,000 m	Bunthing Hem					DNS	
Marathon	Khalid Kamal Khalid Yaseen					DNF	

== Beach volleyball ==
=== Men ===
Athlete	Event	Preliminary Round			Round of 16	Quarterfinals	Semifinals	Finals
Athlete	Event	Opposition Score	Opposition Score	Opposition Score	Opposition Score	Opposition Score	Opposition Score	Opposition Score
Rom Mon; Sothearith Nget	Men's beach volleyball	Chong Long Khoo (MAS); Rafi Asruki Nordin (MAS); L 16-21, 18-21	Dmitriy Yakovlev (KAZ); Alexey Kuleshov (KAZ); L 14-21, 12-21	Kiran Kumar Reddy Meda (IND); Kasi Viswanadha Raju Mudunuri (IND); L 21-14, 13-21, 6-15	did not advance			
Vansak Samath; Mengheak Taing	Men's beach volleyball	Gao Peng (CHN); Li Jian (CHN); L 15-21, 10-21	Reza Assari Naeini (IRI); Rahman Raoufi (IRI); L 11-21, 13-21	Soares FC (TLS); Xavier NDF (TLS); W 21-18, 21-16	did not advance			

== Board games ==
=== Xiangqi ===
Athlete	Event	Win 2.0–0.0	Draw 1.0–1.0	Lost 0.0–2.0	Points	Oppositions Scores	Rank
Chhay Lay	Men's individual	Chamnan Heng (CAM); Jackson Hong (PHI)	Kam Hock Lay (MAS); Kazuharu Shoshi (JPN)	Kam Fun Lei (MAC); Yu Kuen Chiu (HKG); Long Kuok (MAC)	6.0	37.0	13th
Chamnan Heng	Men's individual	Jackson Hong (PHI)	Long Kuok (MAC); Kazuharu Shoshi (JPN)	Thanh Bao Nguyen (VIE); Chung Wei Ma (TPE); Sandy Chua (PHI); Chhay Lay (CAM)	4.0	41.0	15th

== Boxing ==
=== Men ===
Athlete	Event	Round of 32	Round of 16	Quarterfinals	Semifinals	Final
Athlete	Event	Opposition Result	Opposition Result	Opposition Result	Opposition Result	Opposition Result
Sophat Phal	Lightweight	Andy Sivongsack (LAO); L PTS 13-2	Hurshid Tojibaev (UZB); L RSC R2 2:10	did not advance		
Ratha Svay	Light Welterweight	BYE	Vinky Montolalu (INA); L PTS 4-8	did not advance		

== Swimming ==
=== Men ===
Athlete(s)	Event	Heats		Final	
Athlete(s)	Event	Result	Rank	Result	Rank
50 m Freestyle	Thonponloeu Hem	27.68	38th	did not advance	
50 m Breaststroke	Thonponloeu Hem	33.16	32nd	did not advance	

=== Women ===
Athlete(s)	Event	Heats		Final	
Athlete(s)	Event	Result	Rank	Result	Rank
50 m Freestyle	Vitiny Hemthon	33.01	23rd	did not advance	
50 m Breaststroke	Vitiny Hemthon	40.32	17th	did not advance	

== Taekwondo ==
=== Men ===
Athlete	Event	Round of 32	Round of 16	Quarterfinals	Semifinals	Final
Athlete	Event	Opposition Result	Opposition Result	Opposition Result	Opposition Result	Opposition Result
Sovatha Chan	Finweight (-54kg)	BYE	Douangsivilay Phimmasone (LAO); L PTS 2-14	did not advance		
Bouthorn Chhoy	Flyweight (-58kg)	BYE	Chen Yang Wei (TPE); L PTS 1-14	did not advance		

=== Women ===
Athlete	Event	Round of 32	Round of 16	Quarterfinals	Semifinals	Final
Athlete	Event	Opposition Result	Opposition Result	Opposition Result	Opposition Result	Opposition Result
Puthearim Chhoeung	Bantamweight (-53kg)	BYE	Latika Bhandari (IND); L PUN 10-11	did not advance		
Davin Sorn	Middleweight (-73kg)	BYE	Rapatkorn Prasopsuk (IND); L SUP 1-1	did not advance		

== Tennis ==
=== Men ===
Athlete	Event	1st Round	2nd Round	3rd Round	Quarterfinals	Semifinals	Final
Athlete	Event	Opposition Score	Opposition Score	Opposition Score	Opposition Score	Opposition Score	Opposition Score
Kenny Bun	Singles	Aqeel Khan Khan (PAK); L 3-6, 4-6	did not advance				
Sambath Orn	Singles	Jabor Mohammed Al Mutawa (QAT); L 5-7, 0-6	did not advance				
Kenny Bun; Sambath Orn	Doubles		Abdulmalek Khaled Burasais (KSA); Zaki Fouad Al Abdullah (KSA); W 6-1, 6-4	Chu-Huan Yi (TPE); Hsin-Han Lee (TPE); L 1-6, 1-6	did not advance		
Kenny Bun; Sambath Orn	Team		BYE	Chinese Taipei (TPE); L 0-3 (0-2, 0-2, 0-2)	did not advance		

== Wrestling ==
=== Men ===
Freestyle

Athlete	Event	Round of 32	Round of 16	Quarterfinals	Semifinals	Final
Athlete	Event	Opposition Result	Opposition Result	Opposition Result	Opposition Result	
den Piseth Kang	60 kg	BYE	Abdulrahman Farhan (YEM); L PO 0-3	did not advance		

Greco-Roman

Athlete	Event	Round of 16	Quarterfinals	Semifinals	Final
Athlete	Event	Opposition Result	Opposition Result	Opposition Result	Opposition Result
Chivinn Chum	120 kg	Nurmakhan Tinaliyev (KAZ); L VT 0-5		Repechage Round 1 match: Dharmender Dalal (KAZ); L PO 0-3	did not advance

=== Women ===
Freestyle

Athlete	Event	Round of 16	Quarterfinals	Semifinals	Final
Athlete	Event	Opposition Result	Opposition Result	Opposition Result	Opposition Result
Sotheara Chov	48 kg	Maribel Jambora (PHI); W PO 3-0	Thi Lua Nguyen (VIE); L VT 0-5	Repechage Round 1 match: Sriprapa Tho-Kaew (THA); W PP 3-1	Bronze medal match: Hyungjoo Kim (KOR); L PO 0-3
Sothavy Try	63 kg	Mio Nishimaki (JPN); L PO 0-3	did not advance		
