= 2016 OEC Kaohsiung – Doubles =

Doubles
- 2016 OEC Kaohsiung

Final
- Champions: (Thailand) Sanchai Ratiwatana (Thailand) Sonchat Ratiwatana
- Runners-up: (Chinese Taipei) Hsieh Cheng-peng (Chinese Taipei) Yi Chu-huan
- Score: 6–4, 7–6^{(7–4)}

Events
Singles	Doubles
← 2015 ·	OEC Kaohsiung	· 2017 →

Hsieh Cheng-peng and Yang Tsung-hua were the defending champions but chose not to participate together. Hsieh partnered Yi Chu-huan, while Yang partnered Jeevan Nedunchezhiyan. Yang lost in the first round to Wu Tung-lin and Zhang Ze. Hsieh lost in the final to Sanchai and Sonchat Ratiwatana 4–6, 6–7^{(4–7)}.

== Seeds ==
1. (United States) James Cerretani / (Austria) Philipp Oswald (semifinals)
2. (China) Gong Maoxin / (Chinese Taipei) Peng Hsien-yin (semifinals)
3. (Thailand) Sanchai Ratiwatana / (Thailand) Sonchat Ratiwatana (champions)
4. (Chinese Taipei) Hsieh Cheng-peng / (Chinese Taipei) Yi Chu-huan (final)

== Draw ==
=== Key ===
- Q = Qualifier
- WC = Wild card
- LL = Lucky loser
- Alt = Alternate
- SE = Special exempt
- PR = Protected ranking
- ITF = ITF entry
- JE = Junior exempt
- w/o = Walkover
- r = Retired
- d = Defaulted
- SR = Special ranking

First round
1	(United States) J Cerretani (Austria) P Oswald	6	7
(Chinese Taipei) T Chen (Chinese Taipei) J Jung	4	5
(India) J Nedunchezhiyan (Chinese Taipei) T-h Yang	6^{9}	3
WC	(Chinese Taipei) T-l Wu (China) Z Zhang	7^{11}	6
4	(Chinese Taipei) C-p Hsieh (Chinese Taipei) C-h Yi	6	3	[10]
(Israel) D Sela (Israel) A Weintraub	2	6	[8]
(Japan) A Santillan (Japan) Y Uchiyama	6	2	[10]
(Chinese Taipei) J-c Hung (Indonesia) C Rungkat	3	6	[12]
(Russia) A Karatsev (Italy) L Vanni
WC	(Chinese Taipei) Y-h Hsu (Chinese Taipei) K-y Lee	w/o
(Japan) T Matsui (Germany) F Moser	4	4
3	(Thailand) Sa Ratiwatana (Thailand) So Ratiwatana	6	6
(Australia) M Ebden (United States) D Kudla	6	6
WC	(Chinese Taipei) Lin Liang-yu (Chinese Taipei) J Wang	2	3
(Australia) Jarryd Chaplin (Australia) J Thompson	6	6^{5}	[8]
2	(China) M Gong (Chinese Taipei) H-y Peng	3	7^{7}	[10]

Quarterfinals
1	(United States) J Cerretani (Austria) P Oswald	6	7
WC	(Chinese Taipei) T-l Wu (China) Z Zhang	4	5
4	(Chinese Taipei) C-p Hsieh (Chinese Taipei) C-h Yi	6	6
(Chinese Taipei) J-c Hung (Indonesia) C Rungkat	3	2
WC	(Chinese Taipei) Y-h Hsu (Chinese Taipei) K-y Lee	4	2
3	(Thailand) Sa Ratiwatana (Thailand) So Ratiwatana	6	6
(Australia) M Ebden (United States) D Kudla	6^{0}	3
2	(China) M Gong (Chinese Taipei) H-y Peng	7^{7}	6

Semifinals
1	(United States) J Cerretani (Austria) P Oswald	3	7^{7}	[5]
4	(Chinese Taipei) C-p Hsieh (Chinese Taipei) C-h Yi	6	6^{2}	[10]
3	(Thailand) Sa Ratiwatana (Thailand) So Ratiwatana	6	7
2	(China) M Gong (Chinese Taipei) H-y Peng	4	5

Final
4	(Chinese Taipei) C-p Hsieh (Chinese Taipei) C-h Yi	4	6^{4}
3	(Thailand) Sa Ratiwatana (Thailand) So Ratiwatana	6	7^{7}
