= Kazuyuki Nagashima =

Japanese sport wrestler

Personal information
- Born: 25 September 1981 (age 45) Gunma Prefecture, Japan
Medal record
Men's freestyle wrestling
Representing South Korea
Asian Games
Silver medal – second place	2010 Guangzhou	74 kg freestyle
Asian Championships
Bronze medal – third place	2008 Jeju City	74 kg freestyle

Kazuyuki Nagashima (長島 和幸, Nagashima Kazuyuki; born 25 September 1981 in Gunma, Japan) is a Japanese wrestler. He won the silver medal in the 74 kg class in the men's freestyle wrestling competition, at the 2010 Asian Games in Guangzhou, China.
