= Latisha Chan =

Taiwanese tennis player

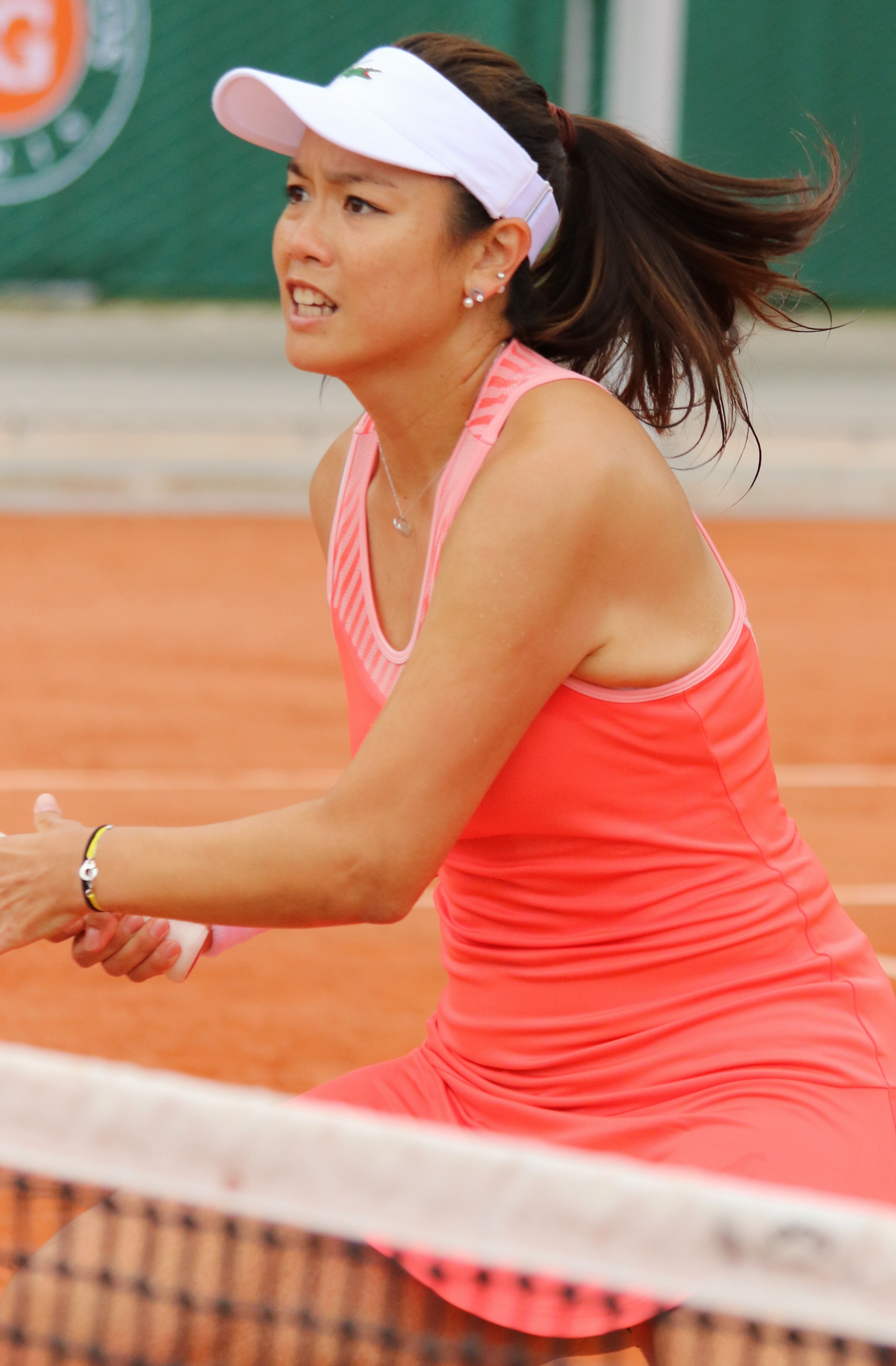
- Chan at the 2019 French Open
- Country (sports): Chinese Taipei
- Residence: Taipei City, Taiwan
- Born: 17 August 1989 (age 37) Dongshi, Taiwan
- Height: 1.70 m (5 ft 7 in)
- Turned pro: August 2004
- Retired: 21 January 2026
- Plays: Right-handed (two-handed backhand)
- Coach: Chan Yuan-liang (her father)
- Prize money: $6,157,131

Singles
- Career record: 292–179
- Career titles: 0
- Highest ranking: No. 50 (11 June 2007)

Grand Slam singles results
- Australian Open: 2R (2009, 2013)
- French Open: 3R (2011)
- Wimbledon: 2R (2010)
- US Open: 3R (2010)

Doubles
- Career record: 572–277
- Career titles: 33
- Highest ranking: No. 1 (23 October 2017)
- Current ranking: No. 69 (18 March 2024)

Grand Slam doubles results
- Australian Open: F (2007, 2015)
- French Open: SF (2017)
- Wimbledon: QF (2017, 2021)
- US Open: W (2017)

Other doubles tournaments
- Tour Finals: SF (2007, 2015, 2017)
- Olympic Games: QF (2016)

Mixed doubles
- Career titles: 3

Grand Slam mixed doubles results
- Australian Open: F (2011)
- French Open: W (2018, 2019)
- Wimbledon: W (2019)
- US Open: SF (2014, 2015, 2016)

Team competitions
- Fed Cup: 22–16
Medal record
Women's tennis
Representing Chinese Taipei
Asian Games
| Gold medal – first place | 2006 Doha | Team |
| Gold medal – first place | 2010 Guangzhou | Doubles |
| Gold medal – first place | 2010 Guangzhou | Mixed doubles |
| Gold medal – first place | 2014 Incheon | Team |
| Gold medal – first place | 2022 Hangzhou | Doubles |
| Silver medal – second place | 2006 Doha | Doubles |
| Silver medal – second place | 2010 Guangzhou | Team |
| Silver medal – second place | 2018 Jakarta-Palembang | Doubles |
| Bronze medal – third place | 2014 Incheon | Doubles |
Universiade
| Gold medal – first place | 2017 Taipei | Doubles |
| Gold medal – first place | 2017 Taipei | Team |
| Bronze medal – third place | 2017 Taipei | Mixed doubles |

Latisha Chan (born 17 August 1989), formerly known by her Chinese name Chan Yung-jan (Chinese: 詹詠然; pinyin: Zhān Yǒngrán; Taiwanese Mandarin: [tsán jʊ̀ŋ zǎn, -lǎn]), is a Taiwanese former professional tennis player who is a former world No. 1 in doubles. She has won 33 career titles in doubles, including a major title at the 2017 US Open alongside Martina Hingis, as well as nine at WTA 1000-level. Chan also finished runner-up at three other major events, the 2007 and 2015 Australian Open, and the 2007 US Open. In mixed doubles, she has won three Grand Slam tournament titles: the 2018 French Open, 2019 French Open, and 2019 Wimbledon Championships, all with Ivan Dodig. Highlights of her singles career include reaching the semifinals at the 2006 Japan Open and the final at the Bangkok Open in 2007. She reached a career-high singles ranking of No. 50 on 11 June 2007, and became world No. 1 in doubles on 23 October 2017, the second Taiwanese player to do so, after Hsieh Su-wei. She again topped the doubles rankings on 13 August 2018, and has spent a total of 34 weeks as world No. 1.

== Early life, family and education ==
Chan is the elder sister of professional tennis player Chan Hao-ching (also known as Angel Chan). The sisters have played together in many tournaments on tour.

Latisha Chan is pursuing her Ph.D. degree in Transnational Sport Management and Innovation at National Taiwan Sport University.

== Career ==
=== Juniors ===
Chan started playing in the ITF Junior Circuit in 2002 and reached the semifinal stage at her first ITF junior event. With solid performances, both in junior and challenger events, her combined junior ranking reached No. 2 on May 24, 2004. However, her most significant junior victory came at the 2004 Australian Open Junior Championships, where she partnered Sun Shengnan to win the doubles trophy.

=== 2003–2005 ===
While still a junior, Chan entered her very first pro-circuit event in Taiwan in 2003. She reached the semifinals in singles and the quarterfinals in doubles. She started her professional career in 2004. By the end of the year, she already was the singles title holder of three $10k events, including Colombo, Jakarta, and Taipei. She also won three doubles titles at Jakarta, Haibara, and Mount Gambier. Her 2005 season got off to a strong start with a win at a $25k event in Taipei. She also won a $50k event in Fukuoka. Later that year, she qualified for the US Open, but failed to defeat Serena Williams in the first round. After the US Open, she played two qualifying events in Beijing and Seoul, but failed to enter the main draw. However, she teamed up with Chuang Chia-jung to win her first tour-level doubles title in Seoul.

=== 2006 ===
Chan played in the qualifying events of all four Grand Slam tournaments and qualified into the main draws in Wimbledon and the US Open, but failed to beat resurgent Australian Alicia Molik and Belgian Kirsten Flipkens, respectively. Her breakthrough and first tour-level win came at the Tokyo Open, where she reached the semifinal stage by defeating local favourite and two-time winner Ai Sugiyama. The victory marked her first top-30 win. She also participated in the doubles event and reached the finals, once again partnering Chuang Chia-jung.

On the Challenger Tour, she won the singles titles in Melbourne, Fukuoka, Kurume, and Kaohsiung. Together with regular partner Chuang, she also won the doubles titles in Sydney, Gosford, Fukuoka, Kurume, and Kaohsiung. After her victory in Kaohsiung, she surged into the top 100 and was ranked No. 73 in singles.

=== 2007 ===
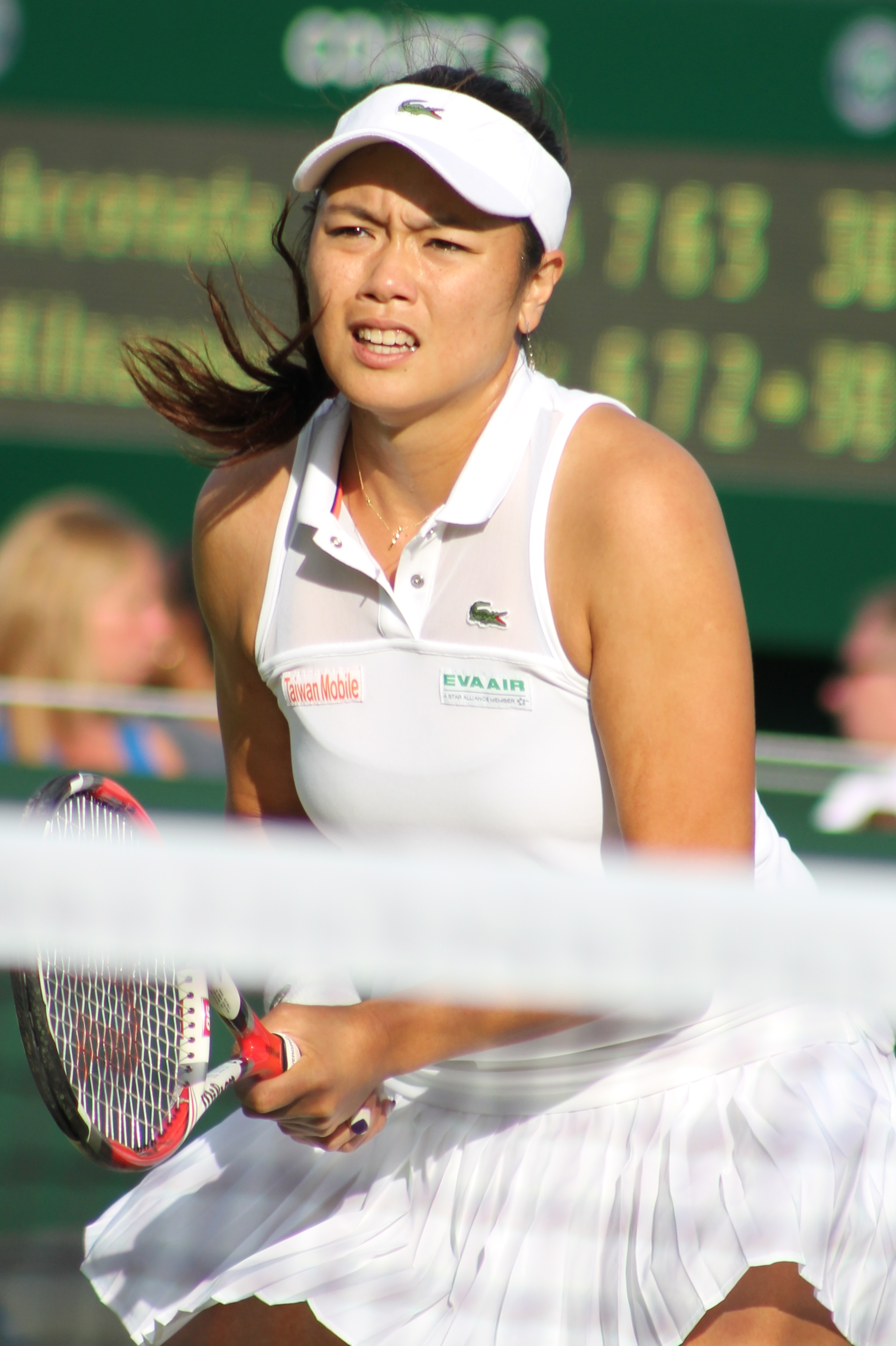
Latisha Chan

To establish herself at the WTA Tour level, Chan only participated in those events at the beginning of 2007. She entered the main draws of the Australian Open, at Pattaya, Bangalore, and Indian Wells, but failed to advance past the first round. In Miami, she reached the second round by defeating Nuria Llagostera Vives, before losing to top seed Maria Sharapova.

Chan finally found her footing after entering the clay court season. In Charleston, she qualified into the main draw, and stunned No. 39 ranked Séverine Brémond in two sets to set up a rematch against Serena Williams. Chan was 5–3 up before Serena retired with a groin injury. However, in the third round, she was defeated by Venus Williams in straight sets.

To improve her singles game, Chan entered three ITF pro events after Charleston and won all three of them. With the success in three events, her ranking rose to a career-high No. 50 on June 11. In Bangkok, Chan reached her first WTA singles final, but lost to No. 49 ranked Flavia Pennetta, in two sets.

Her singles achievements aside, Chan also had success in doubles in 2007. Awarded with a wildcard entry, Chan and Chuang reached the finals of the Australian Open, which was Chan's first Grand Slam doubles event. On their way to the final, they defeated 2006 US Open doubles finalists Dinara Safina and Katarina Srebotnik, and 2006 Australian Open and Wimbledon champions Yan Zi and Zheng Jie. In February, Chan and Chuang participated in two more events. They reached the final at both Pattaya and Bangalore, and won the doubles title in the latter.

In their Indian Wells debut, Chan and Chuang again stormed into the final with back-to-back wins over 2006 Australian Open and Wimbledon champs Yan Zi and Zheng Jie in the quarterfinals, and 2006 US Open champions Vera Zvonareva and Nathalie Dechy in the semifinals. However, they lost the final to 2006 Roland Garros champions Lisa Raymond and Samantha Stosur in straight sets. Had they won the final match, they would have defeated every 2006 Grand Slam champion team in one single event. At that point, they had made it into the final in all six tour-level doubles events they had entered. Their finals streak was broken in Miami, when they lost to Raymond and Stosur in the semifinal.

=== 2008 ===
At the German Open in Berlin, Chan became the last player whom top-ranked Justine Henin ever defeated before she retired the following week. Chan represented her country at the Beijing Olympics, in both singles and doubles.

=== 2009 ===
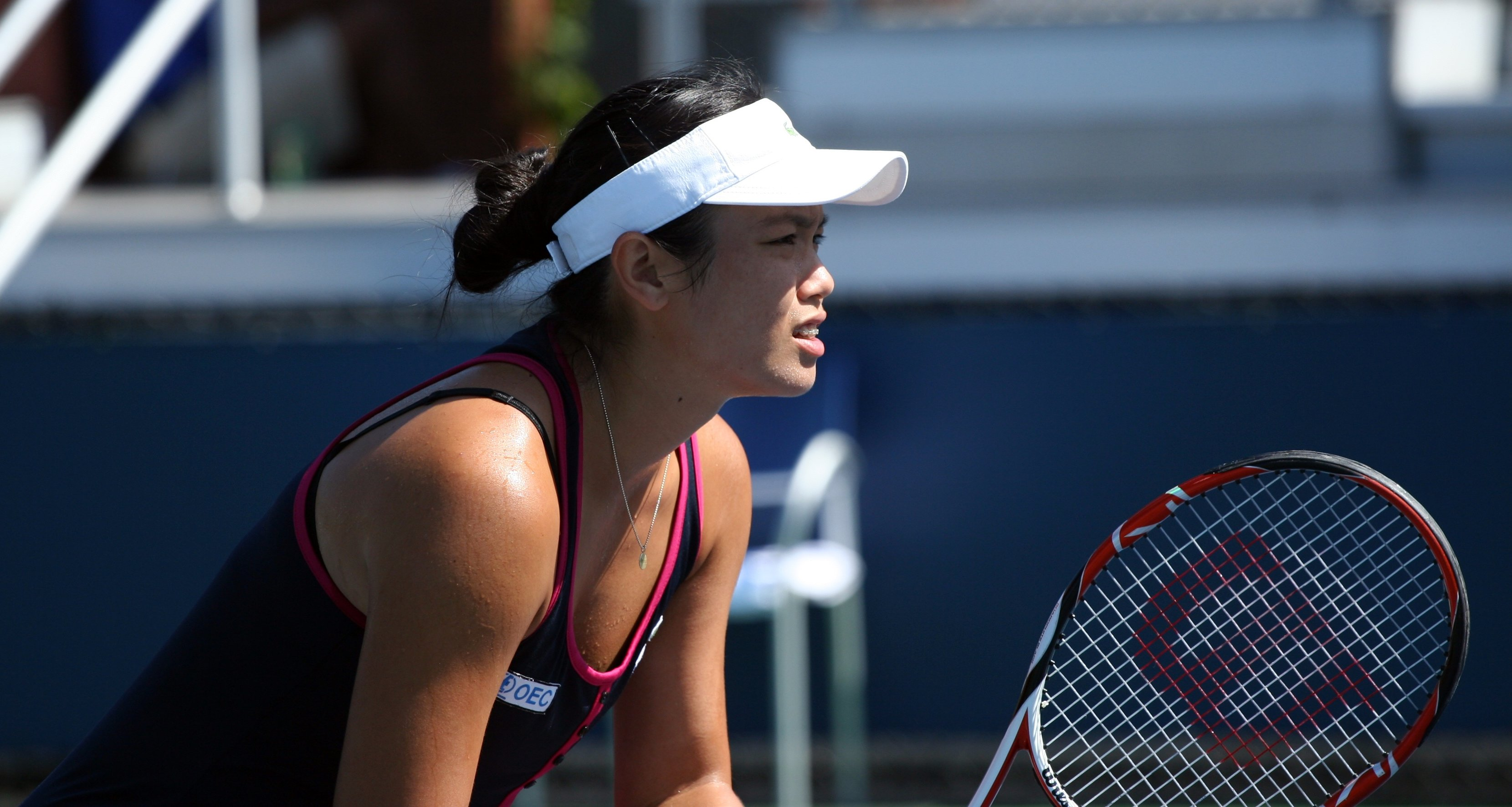
Chan at the 2009 US Open

Chan started the season with an unexpected lead of 5–1 against world No. 4, Elena Dementieva, in their first-round match in Auckland. Chan ultimately lost the match to the eventual champion. After that, her results were uninspiring other than winning a round at the Australian Open, her first time to do so.

Chan was diagnosed with a fatigue fracture in her left foot, which stopped her season for three months after the Miami Open to when the grass-court season kicked off. She suffered quite a number of upsets after her comeback, but rebounded just in time for the Asian tour in the autumn. She delighted home crowds by sweeping both the singles and doubles (with Chuang) titles in the Taipei $100k tournament. For the fourth year in a row, Chan finished the season in the top 100.

On the doubles court, Chan shocked the world-number-one team of Cara Black and Liezel Huber with Monica Niculescu, in the quarterfinals of the Premier-level tournament in Stanford. They were defeated by Serena and Venus Williams in the final after taking out another seeded pair, Maria Kirilenko and Sorana Cîrstea.

=== 2010–2014 ===
At the 2010 US Open, Chan beat two former WTA top-50s, Anne Keothavong and Tamira Paszek, to make her first round of 32 in a Grand Slam tournament, her previous best results had been the round of 64 at the 2008 US Open, 2009 Australian Open, and 2010 Wimbledon Championships. In the third round, she lost 1–6, 0–6 to top seed and world No. 2, Caroline Wozniacki.

At the 2011 Australian Open, she reached the final of mixed doubles with Paul Hanley, their first major final. Along the way, they defeated the defending champions, and fourth-seeded Cara Black and Leander Paes, in two set-tiebreakers. However, this team lost the final to second seeds Daniel Nestor and Katarina Srebotnik in three sets.

Chan reached the semifinals of the 2012 Carlsbad Open, losing to Marion Bartoli in three sets.

2014, she lost the title match of the Taipei Challenger to Vitalia Diatchenko, in three sets.

=== 2015: Australian Open doubles final ===
Chan lost her third Grand Slam doubles final at the Australian Open. She and her sister won their fourth WTA doubles title together at the Cincinnati Open, and by doing so, now have the second-most doubles titles for a pair of sisters in WTA history after only Serena and Venus Williams. The Chans previous three WTA doubles titles came at Shenzhen in 2013, Eastbourne in 2014, and Pattaya City in 2015. Cincinnati represents their biggest title yet, their first at the Premier-5 level. They would go on to win another title at the Japan Women's Open in Tokyo.

=== 2017: US Open doubles champion, world No. 1 ===
In February 2017, Chan teamed up with former world No. 1, Martina Hingis, for the women's doubles competition at the Dubai Championships. Hingis had split from short-time partner CoCo Vandeweghe due to limited success together. In March, Chan won at Indian Wells with Hingis, as they defeated Lucie Hradecká and Kateřina Siniaková in the final. This was the first Premier Mandatory title for Chan, the first big title of her career. The team added titles in Madrid and Rome with final victories over Tímea Babos and Andrea Hlaváčková and Ekaterina Makarova and Elena Vesnina, respectively.

Chan and Hingis played their first Grand Slam tournament together at the French Open. They advanced to the semifinals, where they lost to the eventual champions, Bethanie Mattek-Sands and Lucie Šafářová.

In the Summer Universiade in August, Chan teamed up with her sister Hao-ching to a gold medal in the women's doubles. Then, Chan withdrew from the mixed doubles semifinals due to heatstroke. This move drew criticism from her partner, Hsieh Cheng-peng, and the public, who interpreted the event as Chan abandoning Hsieh to prepare for the US Open. Chan and Hingis won their first Grand Slam women's doubles title together at the US Open when they defeated Hradecká and Siniaková in straight sets. This was their seventh title of the season. After the US Open, Chan released a statement apologizing to Hsieh.

They would win their next title at the Wuhan Open, their third Premier-5 crown of the year. The following tournament, the season's last Premier Mandatory event, they would win their ninth title of the season at the Beijing event. That means they won three out of the four Premier Mandatory events in 2017, only missing out on the Miami Open where they lost in the semifinals. It also meant that they won six of the nine Premier-5/Premier-Mandatory tournaments of the season. Chan and Hingis finished the season as joint world No. 1, only the fifth time in WTA history that a team had shared the year-end top spot.

=== 2018: Struggles with form, French Open mixed-doubles title ===
Chan struggled after Hingis retired. Apart from winning her maiden mixed-doubles title at French Open with Ivan Dodig, she did not win any titles during her 33-week reign as world No. 1. She finally dropped out of that position after losing in the second round at Roland Garros. After a Premier title in San Jose (with Květa Peschke) and a Premier-5 final in Montreal (with Ekaterina Makarova), Chan returned to the No.-1 ranking in doubles only for one week before dropping out of top ten later in the season.

=== 2019: Renewed doubles success; two mixed-doubles titles ===
Chan re-united with her sister Hao-ching at the start of the 2019 season, and they found immediate success. They reached the final of the Brisbane International, and followed that up with wins in the Hobart and Doha championships and a run to the quarterfinals in the Australian Open. In March, they reached the semifinals at Indian Wells, in June, they won the Eastbourne International, and in September, they won the Pan Pacific Open, beating sisters Hsieh Su-wei and Hsieh Yu-chieh in the final, to record their 14th WTA tournament win together. It was the first time the sisters had won four tournaments in a single season. The following week, they reached the quarterfinals of the Wuhan Open. On 7 October, they became the fifth team to qualify for the 2019 WTA Finals where they did not do well, losing all three of their matches in the group stage.

In mixed doubles, Chan and Dodig won their second French Open title and followed it up with the Wimbledon title.

=== 2024: Paris Olympics ===
She took part in the women's doubles at the Paris Olympics alongside her sister, Chan Hao-ching, but they lost in the first round to Barbora Krejčíková and Kateřina Siniaková.

=== 2026: Retirement ===
On 21 January 2026, Latisha Chan announced her retirement.

== Equipment ==
The Chan sisters use Wilson racquets. They are also sponsored by Taiwan Mobile, EVA Air, and French apparel company Lacoste.

== Career statistics ==
=== Grand Slam performance timelines ===
Key
| W | F | SF | QF | #R | RR | Q# | P# | DNQ | A | Z# | PO | G | S | B | NMS | NTI | P | NH |

(W) winner; (F) finalist; (SF) semifinalist; (QF) quarterfinalist; (#R) rounds 4, 3, 2, 1; (RR) round-robin stage; (Q#) qualification round; (P#) preliminary round; (DNQ) did not qualify; (A) absent; (Z#) Davis/Fed Cup Zonal Group (with number indication) or (PO) play-off; (G) gold, (S) silver or (B) bronze Olympic/Paralympic medal; (NMS) not a Masters tournament; (NTI) not a Tier I tournament; (P) postponed; (NH) not held; (SR) strike rate (events won / competed); (W–L) win–loss record.
To avoid confusion and double counting, these charts are updated at the conclusion of a tournament or when the player's participation has ended.

Only main-draw results in WTA Tour, Grand Slam tournaments, Fed Cup/Billie Jean King Cup and Olympic Games are included in win–loss records and career statistics.

==== Singles ====
| Tournament | 2005 | 2006 | 2007 | 2008 | 2009 | 2010 | 2011 | 2012 | 2013 | 2014 | 2015 | SR | W–L |
|---|---|---|---|---|---|---|---|---|---|---|---|---|---|
| Australian Open | A | Q2 | 1R | 1R | 2R | 1R | Q3 | A | 2R | 1R | Q1 | 0 / 6 | 2–6 |
| French Open | A | Q1 | 1R | 1R | A | 1R | 3R | 2R | A | A | Q2 | 0 / 5 | 3–5 |
| Wimbledon | A | 1R | 1R | 1R | 1R | 2R | Q1 | Q1 | A | A | A | 0 / 5 | 1–5 |
| US Open | 1R | 1R | 1R | 2R | Q3 | 3R | 1R | Q3 | Q2 | 1R | Q2 | 0 / 7 | 3–7 |
| Win–loss | 0–1 | 0–2 | 0–4 | 1–4 | 1–2 | 3–4 | 2–2 | 1–1 | 1–1 | 0–2 | 0–0 | 0 / 23 | 9–23 |

==== Doubles ====
| Tournament | 2005 | 2006 | 2007 | 2008 | 2009 | 2010 | 2011 | 2012 | 2013 | 2014 | 2015 | 2016 | 2017 | 2018 | 2019 | 2020 | 2021 | 2022 | 2023 | SR | W–L |
|---|---|---|---|---|---|---|---|---|---|---|---|---|---|---|---|---|---|---|---|---|---|
| Australian Open | A | A | F | 3R | 1R | 3R | 3R | A | 1R | 1R | F | QF | 1R | QF | QF | SF | 1R | A | 2R | 0 / 15 | 30–15 |
| French Open | A | A | QF | QF | A | 3R | 3R | 3R | A | 2R | 3R | QF | SF | 2R | 2R | A | 3R | 3R | QF | 0 / 14 | 31–14 |
| Wimbledon | A | A | 3R | 1R | 1R | 1R | 2R | 1R | A | 1R | 1R | 2R | QF | 2R | 3R | NH | QF | 1R | 2R | 0 / 15 | 14–15 |
| US Open | A | A | F | 1R | 2R | SF | 1R | 1R | 1R | 2R | QF | 2R | W | 2R | 2R | A | A | 1R | 2R | 1 / 15 | 24–14 |
| Win–loss | 0–0 | 0–0 | 15–4 | 5–4 | 1–3 | 8–4 | 5–4 | 2–3 | 0–2 | 2–4 | 10–4 | 8–4 | 13–3 | 6–4 | 7–4 | 4–1 | 5–3 | 2–3 | 6–4 | 1 / 58 | 99–58 |
Career statistics
| Tournaments | 2 | 3 | 18 | 24 | 13 | 17 | 15 | 12 | 6 | 18 | 21 | 24 | 24 | 17 | 22 | 6 | 13 | 12 | 4 | Total: 271 | |
| Finals | 1 | 0 | 3 | 3 | 1 | 1 | 0 | 0 | 1 | 1 | 3 | 3 | 11 | 1 | 4 | 0 | 1 | 0 | 0 | 34 / 58 | 27–21 |
| Year-end ranking | 148 | 119 | 8 | 17 | 52 | 18 | 42 | 72 | 98 | 36 | 7 | 12 | 1 | 21 | 15 | 15 | 32 | 112 | 30 | | |

==== Mixed doubles ====
| Tournament | 2007 | 2008 | 2009 | 2010 | 2011 | 2012 | 2013 | 2014 | 2015 | 2016 | 2017 | 2018 | 2019 | 2020 | 2021 | 2022 | 2023 | W–L |
|---|---|---|---|---|---|---|---|---|---|---|---|---|---|---|---|---|---|---|
| Australian Open | A | QF | A | A | F | A | A | A | 1R | QF | 2R | 2R | 1R | QF | 1R | A | 1R | 12–10 |
| French Open | 1R | 1R | A | A | 2R | A | A | A | QF | QF | 1R | W | W | NH | 1R | A | 1R | 15–8 |
| Wimbledon | 3R | 3R | A | QF | SF | A | A | 1R | 2R | 3R | WD | QF | W | NH | 3R | 2R (Note: Withdrawals during tournaments are not considered as a loss.) | QF | 17–9 |
| US Open | 2R | 1R | A | QF | 2R | A | 2R | SF | SF | SF | 2R | 2R | SF | NH | A | A | 1R | 19–10 |
| Win–loss | 2–3 | 3–4 | 0–0 | 4–2 | 9–4 | 0–0 | 1–1 | 3–2 | 5–4 | 8–4 | 2–3 | 9–2 | 13–2 | 2–1 | 1–3 | 1–0 | 2–4 | 65–39 |

== Grand Slam tournament finals ==
=== Doubles: 4 (1 title, 3 runner-ups) ===
| Result | Year | Championship | Surface | Partner | Opponents | Score |
|---|---|---|---|---|---|---|
| Loss | 2007 | Australian Open | Hard | (Chinese Taipei) Chuang Chia-jung | (Zimbabwe) Cara Black (South Africa) Liezel Huber | 4–6, 7–6^{(7–4)}, 1–6 |
| Loss | 2007 | US Open | Hard | (Chinese Taipei) Chuang Chia-jung | (France) Nathalie Dechy; (Russia) Dinara Safina | 4–6, 2–6 |
| Loss | 2015 | Australian Open | Hard | (China) Zheng Jie | (United States) Bethanie Mattek-Sands (Czech Republic) Lucie Šafářová | 4–6, 6–7^{(5–7)} |
| Win | 2017 | US Open | Hard | (Switzerland) Martina Hingis | (Czech Republic) Lucie Hradecká (Czech Republic) Kateřina Siniaková | 6–3, 6–2 |

=== Mixed doubles: 4 (3 titles, 1 runner-up) ===
| Result | Year | Championship | Surface | Partner | Opponents | Score |
|---|---|---|---|---|---|---|
| Loss | 2011 | Australian Open | Hard | (Australia) Paul Hanley | (Slovenia) Katarina Srebotnik (Canada) Daniel Nestor | 3–6, 6–3, [7–10] |
| Win | 2018 | French Open | Clay | (Croatia) Ivan Dodig | (Canada) Gabriela Dabrowski (Croatia) Mate Pavić | 6–1, 6–7^{(5–7)}, [10–8] |
| Win | 2019 | French Open(2) | Clay | (Croatia) Ivan Dodig | (Canada) Gabriela Dabrowski (Croatia) Mate Pavić | 6–1, 7–6^{(7–5)} |
| Win | 2019 | Wimbledon | Grass | (Croatia) Ivan Dodig | (Latvia) Jeļena Ostapenko; (Sweden) Robert Lindstedt | 6–2, 6–3 |

== See also ==
- Sport in Taiwan
