= Chinese Taipei at the 2010 Asian Games =

- IOC code: TPE
- NOC: Chinese Taipei Olympic Committee

in Guangzhou
- Competitors: 397 in 32 sports
- Flag bearer: Chien Yu-chin (badminton)
- Officials: 109
- Medals Ranked 7th: Gold 13 Silver 16 Bronze 38 Total 67

Asian Games appearances (overview)
- 1954; 1958; 1962; 1966; 1970; 1974–1986; 1990; 1994; 1998; 2002; 2006; 2010; 2014; 2018; 2022; 2026

Flag of the Republic of China

The Chinese Taipei participated at the 16th Asian Games in Guangzhou, China.

== Medal table ==
| Sport | Gold | Silver | Bronze | Total |
|---|---|---|---|---|
| Roller sports | 4 | 4 | 1 | 9 |
| Tennis | 3 | 2 | 1 | 6 |
| Soft tennis | 2 | 2 | 3 | 7 |
| Taekwondo | 2 | 0 | 3 | 5 |
| Cue sports | 1 | 2 | 5 | 8 |
| Cycling | 1 | 0 | 1 | 2 |
| Karate | 0 | 2 | 4 | 6 |
| Judo | 0 | 1 | 2 | 3 |
| Athletics | 0 | 1 | 1 | 2 |
| Rowing | 0 | 1 | 0 | 1 |
| Baseball | 0 | 1 | 0 | 1 |
| Wushu | 0 | 0 | 4 | 4 |
| Golf | 0 | 0 | 3 | 3 |
| Gymnastics | 0 | 0 | 2 | 2 |
| Weightlifting | 0 | 0 | 2 | 2 |
| Archery | 0 | 0 | 1 | 1 |
| Swimming | 0 | 0 | 1 | 1 |
| Weiqi | 0 | 0 | 1 | 1 |
| Xiangqi | 0 | 0 | 1 | 1 |
| Softball | 0 | 0 | 1 | 1 |
| Badminton | 0 | 0 | 1 | 1 |
| Total | 13 | 16 | 38 | 67 |

== Medalist ==
| Medal | Name | Sport | Event |
|---|---|---|---|
| Gold | Chinese Taipei | Soft tennis | Men's Team |
| Gold | Kuo Po-cheng | Cue sports | Men's Eight-ball singles |
| Gold | Chinese Taipei | Tennis | Men's Team |
| Gold | Huang Hsien-yung | Taekwondo | Women's Finweight-46 kg |
| Gold | Yang Sheng-fa & Li Chia-hung | Soft tennis | Men's Doubles |
| Gold | Wei Cheng-yang | Taekwondo | Men's Finweight-54 kg |
| Gold | Chan Yung-jan & Chuang Chia-jung | Tennis | Women's Doubles |
| Gold | Yang Tsung-hua & Chan Yung-jan | Tennis | Mixed Doubles |
| Gold | Sung Ching-Yang | Roller sports | Men's 300m time-trail |
| Gold | Hsiao Mei-yu | Cycling | Women's road race |
| Gold | Huang Yu-ting | Roller sports | Women's 500m sprint race |
| Gold | Sung Ching-Yang | Roller sports | Men's 500m sprint race |
| Gold | Wang Hsiao-chu | Roller sports | Women's Single Free Skating |
| Silver | Wang Chin-fang | Judo | Women's Half middleweight-63 kg |
| Silver | Chinese Taipei | Soft tennis | Women's Team |
| Silver | Li Chia-hung & Cheng Chu-ling | Soft tennis | Mixed Doubles |
| Silver | Lai Hui-shan | Cue sports | Women's Six-red snooker singles |
| Silver | Chinese Taipei | Tennis | Women's Team |
| Silver | Wang Ming-hui | Rowing | Men's single sculls |
| Silver | Chinese Taipei | Baseball | Men's Team |
| Silver | Chou Chieh-yu | Cue sports | Women's Nine-ball singles |
| Silver | Hsieh Su-wei & Chang Kai-chen | Tennis | Women's Doubles |
| Silver | Lo Wei-lin | Roller sports | Men's 300m time-trail |
| Silver | Lo Wei-lin | Roller sports | Men's 500m sprint race |
| Silver | Huang Yu-chi | Karate | Women's Individual Kata |
| Silver | Chinese Taipei | Athletics | Men's 4 × 100 m Relay |
| Silver | Huang Hao-yun | Karate | Men's -75 kg |
| Silver | Yeh Chia-chen | Roller sports | Men's Single Free Skating |
| Silver | Weng Tzu-hsia & Chen Li-hsin | Roller sports | Pairs Skating |
| Bronze | Chen Wei-ling | Weightlifting | Women 48 kg |
| Bronze | Hsiao Mei-yu | Cycling | Women's 500 metre time trial |
| Bronze | Chen Wan-jung | Swimming | Women's 400 m individual medley |
| Bronze | Chinese Taipei | Cue sports | Women's Six-red snooker team |
| Bronze | Tseng Han-chieh | Judo | Men's -90 kg |
| Bronze | Lee Wen-jung | Wushu | Women's Jianshu\Qiangshu All-Round |
| Bronze | Lien Chen-ling | Judo | Women's -57 kg |
| Bronze | Wen Ching-ni | Wushu | Women's Taijiquan\Taijijian All-Round |
| Bronze | Huang Che-kuei | Gymnastics | Men's Pommel horse |
| Bronze | Chen Chih-yu | Gymnastics | Men's Rings |
| Bronze | Hsiao Yung-jih | Wushu | Men's Taijiquan\Taijijian All-Round |
| Bronze | Chiang Wan-chi | Soft tennis | Women's Singles |
| Bronze | Li Sheng-fa | Soft tennis | Men's Singles |
| Bronze | Liu Chia-lun & Hang Chia-ling | Soft tennis | Mixed Doubles |
| Bronze | Wang Ya-jhen | Weightlifting | Women's 69 kg |
| Bronze | Wu Tzu-yi | Wushu | Women's Sanshou 60 kg |
| Bronze | Chang Shu-han | Cue sports | Women's Eight-ball singles |
| Bronze | Chou Chieh-yu | Cue sports | Women's Eight-ball singles |
| Bronze | Ko Ping-yi | Cue sports | Men's Night-ball singles |
| Bronze | Lin Yuan-chun | Cue sports | Women's Nine-ball singles |
| Bronze | Gao Yi-ping | Xiangqi | Women's Individual |
| Bronze | Chang Chiung-fang | Taekwondo | Women's Lightweight-62 kg |
| Bronze | Lo Tsing-jui | Taekwondo | Men's Featherweight-68 kg |
| Bronze | Hsu Chia-lin | Taekwondo | Men's Fineweight-54 kg |
| Bronze | Chen Hung-ling & Cheng Wen-hsing | Badminton | Mixed Doubles |
| Bronze | Hung Chien-yao | Golf | Men's Individual |
| Bronze | Chinese Taipei | Golf | Men's Team |
| Bronze | Chinese Taipei | Golf | Women's Team |
| Bronze | Yi Chu-huan & Li Hsin-han | Tennis | Men's Doubles |
| Bronze | Sung Chia-chun | Archery | Men's Individual |
| Bronze | Chen Yen-hui | Karate | Women's -50 kg |
| Bronze | Hsieh Cheng-kang | Karate | Men's -55 kg |
| Bronze | Pan Yi-chin | Roller sports | Women's 10000m Points+Elimination Race |
| Bronze | Chang Ming-huang | Athletics | Men's Shot Put |
| Bronze | Liu Ya-li | Karate | Women's -68 kg |
| Bronze | Yen Tzu-yao | Karate | Men's -84 kg |
| Bronze | Chinese Taipei | Softball | Women's |
| Bronze | Chinese Taipei | Weiqi | Women's Team |

== See also ==
- Sockgate
