= Mio Nishimaki =

Japanese sport wrestler

Medal record

Women's freestyle wrestling

Representing Japan

World Championships
| Gold medal – first place | 2008 Tokyo | 63 kg |
| Gold medal – first place | 2009 Herning | 63 kg |

Mio Nishimaki (born July 17, 1987) is a female freestyle wrestler from Japan. She won a gold medal at the 2008 FILA Wrestling World Championships in the -63 kg category.

== Awards ==
- Tokyo Sports
  - Wrestling Special Award (2009)
