= Karan Rastogi =

Indian tennis player

- Country (sports): India; Hong Kong
- Born: 8 October 1986 (age 39) Bombay, India
- Height: 5 ft 10 in (178 cm)
- Plays: Right-handed
- Prize money: $95,918

Singles
- Career record: 2–8 (ATP Tour & Davis Cup)
- Highest ranking: No. 284 (14 February 2011)

Doubles
- Career record: 1–4 (ATP Tour & Davis Cup)
- Highest ranking: No. 217 (11 June 2012)
Medal record
Representing India
Asian Games
Bronze medal – third place	2010 Guangzhou	Team

Karan Rastogi (born 8 October 1986) is an Indian tennis player, who also represented Hong Kong in international competitions. He started playing tennis at the age of 3. He was ranked No.1 in all age groups in India from the under 12s to the under 18s.

In 2000, he became the first Indian to win three events at the junior nationals winning the boys under 14 singles and doubles and the boys under 16 singles in one week at the same event. In the same year he also led the Indian under 14 team to finish as runners up in the Asia/Oceania boys under 14 World Junior Tennis event, thus qualifying for the World finals to be held in Czech Republic. In the world finals as India's no.1 player Karan lost the first match to the then 14-year-old Rafael Nadal as India lost to Spain 0–3. He was named Asia's no.1 Under 14 boys player in 2000.

In 2002, he received the award for the most promising junior in India at the ATP Chennai Open.

In 2003, he turned professional. He reached the semi-finals of the Australian Open Junior Championship in 2004. He was then selected to be part of the Indian Davis Cup team for the first time against New Zealand in February 2004. In his first full year on the professional circuit Karan went from a ranking of 1100 in January to 350 at the end of the year.

In 2007 at the ATP Chennai Open, Karan beat Thiago Alves from Brazil in the first round and lost to world no.2 Rafael Nadal 64 61 in the second round. This was the year he played his first live match in Davis Cup against Uzbekistan as India's no.1 singles player.

Karan represented India in Davis Cup from 2004 to 2011. And Asian Games in 2006 and 2010. Winning the bronze medal in the 2010 edition.

In 2008 Karan underwent a lower back operation which kept him out of the game for more than 18 months. Within 15 months of his comeback Karan reached his career best singles ranking of 284 in 2011 February. He also won two back to back ATP doubles challenger events in 2011 reaching a career high doubles ranking of 217.

In 2012 Rastogi decided to quit his playing career and begin a coaching career. He completed an A level coaching course from GPTCA and is an ATP certified tennis coach. In 2012 November Karan joined forces with the Hong Kong Tennis Association to coach and help all their national teams. He has coached their Davis Cup and Fed cup teams to promotion and also has captained the under 14 boys and girls teams and the Junior Davis Cup teams. Karan currently is coaching the various national teams of Hong Kong.

In 2016, Karan made a comeback to playing and represented Hong Kong as a player for the first time in Davis Cup and won both his singles and doubles matches against Lebanon to win promotion for Hong Kong from Group 3 to Group 2. In 2017, Karan again won his singles and doubles matches for Hong Kong against Vietnam to help Hong Kong reach the semi-finals of the Asia/Oceania Group 2.

== Personal life ==
He currently resides in Hong Kong with his wife whom he married in January 2014.
