= Kim Young-jun (tennis) =

South Korean tennis player

- Country (sports): South Korea
- Born: 23 February 1980 (age 45)
- Plays: Right-handed
- Prize money: $70,359

Singles
- Career record: 6–3 (at ATP Tour level, Grand Slam level, and in Davis Cup)
- Career titles: 0
- Highest ranking: No. 255 (5 July 2010)

Doubles
- Career record: 1–1 (at ATP Tour level, Grand Slam level, and in Davis Cup)
- Career titles: 0
- Highest ranking: No. 558 (26 May 2003)
- Last updated on: 25 June 2018.

Kim Young-jun (born 23 February 1980) is a former South Korean tennis player.

Kim has a career high ATP singles ranking of 255 achieved on 5 July 2010. He also has a career high ATP doubles ranking of 558 achieved on 26 May 2003.

Kim has 1 ATP Challenger Tour title at the 2003 Busan Open.
