= Yi Chu-huan =

Taiwanese tennis player

Yi Chu-huan 易楚寰
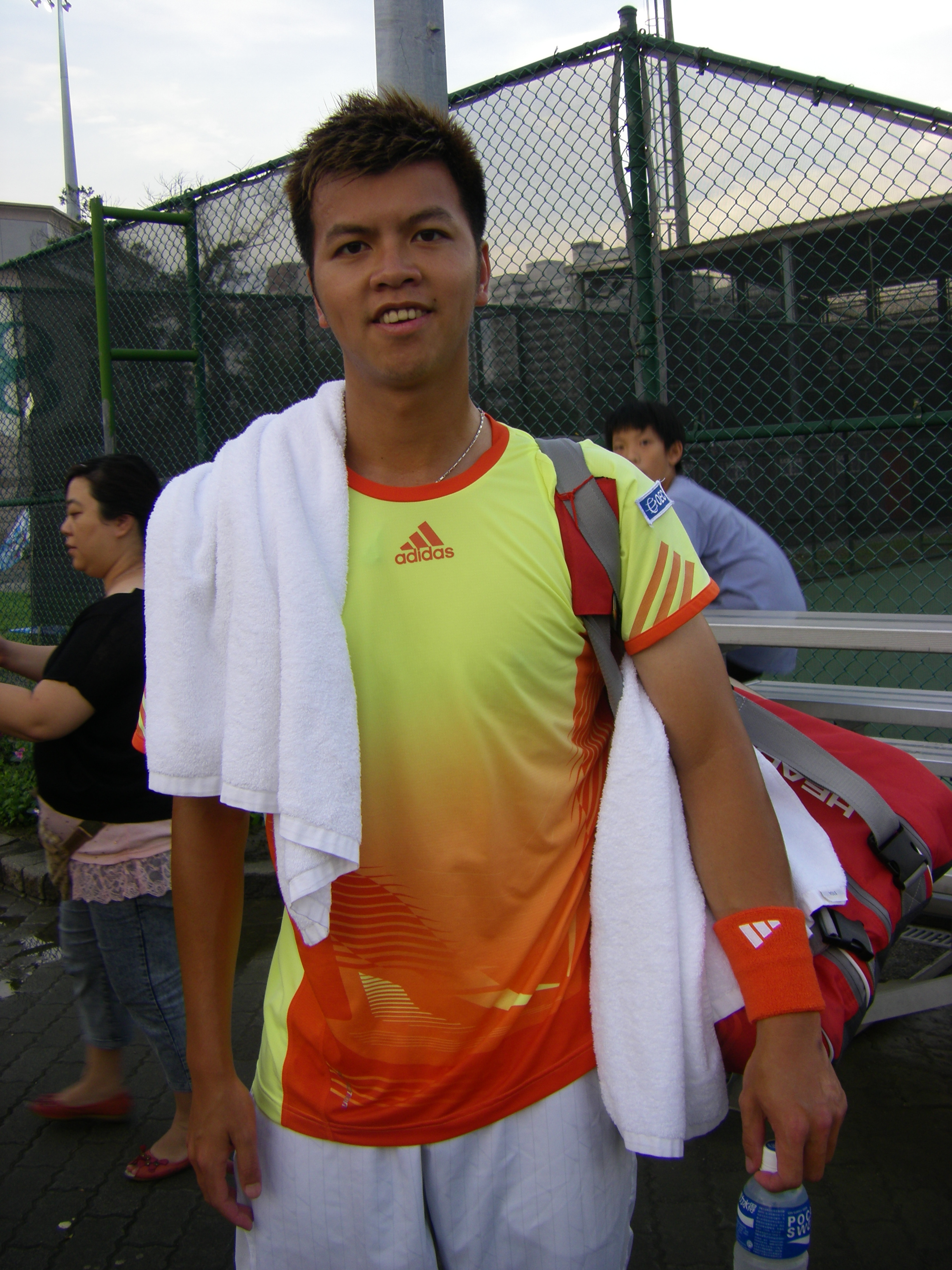
- Country (sports): Chinese Taipei
- Residence: Kaohsiung, Taiwan
- Born: 21 August 1987 (age 38) Taipei, Taiwan
- Height: 1.78 m (5 ft 10 in)
- Turned pro: 2005
- Plays: Left Handed (one-handed backhand)
- Prize money: $125,254

Singles
- Career record: 0–2
- Career titles: 0 (0 Challenger, 2 ITF)
- Highest ranking: No. 489 (11 January 2010)

Doubles
- Career record: 4–8
- Career titles: 0 (8 Challenger, 27 ITF)
- Highest ranking: No. 109 (20 February 2017)

Team competitions
- Davis Cup: 4–9
Medal record
Men's Tennis
Representing Chinese Taipei
Asian Games
Gold medal – first place	2010 Guangzhou	Men's Team
Bronze medal – third place	2010 Guangzhou	Men's Doubles
Bronze medal – third place	2006 Doha	Men's Team
Universiade
Gold medal – first place	2009 Belgrade	Men's Doubles
Gold medal – first place	2009 Belgrade	Mixed Doubles
Bronze medal – third place	2009 Belgrade	Men's Team
- Last updated on: 17 April 2021.

Yi Chu-huan
- Traditional Chinese: 易楚寰
- Simplified Chinese: 易楚寰
Transcriptions
Standard Mandarin
- Hanyu Pinyin: Yì Chǔhuán

Yi Chu-huan (Chinese: 易楚寰; born 31 August 1987) is a Taiwanese professional tennis player who plays primarily on the ATP Challenger Tour and ITF Futures Tour. On 11 January 2010, he reached his highest ATP singles ranking at world No. 489. He reached his highest doubles ranking of world No. 109 on 20 February 2017.

== Juniors ==
As a junior, Yi reached his highest combined singles/doubles ranking of world No. 4 on April 25, 2005.

Yi won the 2005 Australian Open junior boys' doubles title. Partnering Kim Sun-Yong of Korea, they defeated Thiemo de Bakker and Donald Young 6–3, 6–4 in the final to win the championship.

== Career ==
Yi has reached 6 career singles finals, posting a record of 2 wins and 6 losses. Additionally, he has reached a bountiful 63 career doubles finals, holding s record of 35 wins and 28 losses.

He represents his native country of Chinese Taipei during Davis Cup play, and holds a record of 0–2 in singles matches and 4–7 in doubles matches for a combined total of a 4-9 record.

== ATP Challenger and ITF Futures finals ==
=== Singles: 6 (2–4) ===
Legend ATP Challenger (0–0) ITF Futures (2–4)	Finals by surface Hard (1–3) Clay (0–1) Grass (0–0) Carpet (1–0)

Result	W–L	Date	Tournament	Tier	Surface	Opponent	Score
Loss	0–1	Aug 2005	Indonesia F1, Yogyakarta	Futures	Hard	(Brazil) Guilherme Ochiai	6–3, 5–7, 3–6
Loss	0–2	Jun 2008	Japan F4, Karuizawa	Futures	Clay	(United States) Stephen Bass	5–7, 6–4, 3–6
Win	1–2	Mar 2009	Japan F1, Nishitama	Futures	Hard	(Japan) Yuichi Sugita	6–2, 6–7^{(1-7)}, 7–5
Loss	1–3	Mar 2009	Japan F2, Tokyo	Futures	Hard	(Japan) Gouichi Motomura	6–3, 6–7^{(1-7)}, 3–6
Win	2–3	Jun 2009	Japan F6, Akishima	Futures	Carpet	(Japan) Hiroki Moriya	5–7, 6–2, 6–2
Loss	2–4	Apr 2010	Japan F3, Kofu	Futures	Hard	(Japan) Go Soeda	3–6, 4–6

=== Doubles: 63 (35–28) ===
Legend ATP Challenger (8–8) ITF Futures (27–20)	Finals by surface Hard (28–25) Clay (2–1) Grass (1–0) Carpet (4–2)

Result	W–L	Date	Tournament	Tier	Surface	Partner	Opponents	Score
Win	1–0	Aug 2005	Indonesia F2, Semarang	Futures	Hard	(Chinese Taipei) Chang Kai-Lung	(Indonesia) Suwandi Suwandi (Indonesia) Bonit Wiryawan	6–3, 6–4
Loss	1–1	Sep 2005	Japan F9, Kashiwa	Futures	Hard	(Chinese Taipei) Chang Kai-Lung	(United States) David Martin (United States) Michael Yani	4–6, 4–6
Loss	1–2	Dec 2005	Sri Lanka F2, Colombo	Futures	Clay	(Chinese Taipei) Lee Hsin-Han	(India) Vinod Sridhar (India) Ravi-Shankar Pathanjali	3–6, 3–6
Loss	1–3	Apr 2006	Japan F3, Shizuoka	Futures	Carpet	(Chinese Taipei) Liu Tai-Wei	(Japan) Hiroki Kondo (Japan) Takahiro Terachi	2–6, 4–6
Win	2–3	Sep 2006	Japan F10, Sapporo	Futures	Carpet	(Chinese Taipei) Lee Hsin-Han	(United States) Minh Le (United States) James Pade	4–6, 7–6^{(7–2)}, 6–4
Loss	2–4	Oct 2007	China F7, Beijing	Futures	Hard	(Chinese Taipei) Lin Tzu-Yang	(China) Yu Xinyuan (China) Zeng Shaoxuan	6–7^{(4-7)}, 3–6
Loss	2–5	Mar 2008	Japan F2, Tokyo	Futures	Hard	(Chinese Taipei) Lin Tzu-Yang	(New Zealand) Daniel King-Turner (New Zealand) G.D. Jones	3–6, 2–6
Win	3–5	Apr 2008	China F4, Taizhou	Futures	Hard	(Chinese Taipei) Lin Tzu-Yang	(China) Yu Xinyuan (China) Zeng Shaoxuan	6–1, 6–1
Loss	3–6	Aug 2008	Indonesia F1, Jakarta	Futures	Hard	(Chinese Taipei) Peng Hsien-yin	(Indonesia) Christopher Rungkat (Indonesia) Ayrton Wibowo	1–6, 5–7
Win	4–6	Oct 2008	Japan F10, Kashiwa	Futures	Hard	(Chinese Taipei) Yang Tsung-Hua	(Chinese Taipei) Peng Hsien-yin (Chinese Taipei) Huang Chin-Yu	6–1, 6–2
Loss	4–7	Oct 2008	Japan F11, Tokyo	Futures	Hard	(Chinese Taipei) Yang Tsung-Hua	(Japan) Hiroki Kondo (Japan) Yaoki Ishii	4–6, 2–6
Win	5–7	Mar 2009	Japan F1, Nishitama	Futures	Hard	(Japan) Hiroyasu Sato	(Japan) Akito Higa (Japan) Tomohiro Shinokawa	6–2, 6–3
Win	6–7	Apr 2009	Japan F3, Kofu	Futures	Hard	(Chinese Taipei) Yang Tsung-Hua	(Japan) Yuya Kibi (Japan) Tomohiro Shinokawa	6–1, 6–0
Win	7–7	Jun 2009	Japan F6, Akishima	Futures	Carpet	(Chinese Taipei) Chen I-Ta	(Japan) Tasuku Iwami (Japan) Hiroki Kondo	6–2, 5–7, [12–10]
Loss	7–8	Aug 2009	China F5, Chongqing	Futures	Hard	(Chinese Taipei) Chen I-Ta	(China) Zeng Shaoxuan (China) Zhang Ze	5–7, 6–7^{(5–7)}
Win	8–8	Oct 2009	Japan F8, Kashiwa	Futures	Hard	(Japan) Junn Mitsuhashi	(Chinese Taipei) Yang Tsung-Hua (Chinese Taipei) Lee Hsin-Han	6–4, 6–2
Win	9–8	Nov 2009	Yokohama, Japan	Challenger	Hard	(Chinese Taipei) Yang Tsung-Hua	(Japan) Junn Mitsuhashi (Kazakhstan) Alexey Kedryuk	6–7^{(9–11)}, 6–3, [12–10]
Win	10–8	Mar 2010	Japan F1, Tokyo	Futures	Hard	(Japan) Bumpei Sato	(Japan) Tasuku Iwami (Japan) Hiroki Kondo	6–4, 6–4
Loss	10–9	Apr 2010	Korea F2, Daegu	Futures	Hard	(Japan) Hiroki Kondo	(Australia) Adam Feeney (Finland) Harri Heliovaara	2–6, 2–6
Loss	10–10	May 2010	Korea F4, Gimcheon	Futures	Hard	(Japan) Junn Mitsuhashi	(South Korea) An Jae-Sung (South Korea) Lim Yong-kyu	6–7^{(4-7)}, 4–6
Win	11–10	Jun 2010	Malaysia F1, Kuala Lumpur	Futures	Hard	(Chinese Taipei) Yang Tsung-Hua	(Australia) Kaden Hensel (Australia) Dane Propoggia	6–3, 6–3
Win	12–10	Oct 2010	Japan F9, Kashiwa	Futures	Hard	(Japan) Yuichi Ito	(Japan) Bumpei Sato (Finland) Harri Heliovaara	4–6, 6–1, [10–8]
Loss	12–11	Jan 2011	China F1, Mengzi City	Futures	Hard	(Chinese Taipei) Lee Hsin-Han	(China) Li Zhe (China) Gong Maoxin	1–6, 1–6
Loss	12–12	Jan 2011	China F2, Mengzi City	Futures	Hard	(Chinese Taipei) Lee Hsin-Han	(China) Li Zhe (China) Gong Maoxin	6–4, 3–6, [4–10]
Win	13–12	Jun 2011	Korea F3, Gimcheon	Futures	Hard	(Japan) Hiroki Kondo	(South Korea) Oh Dae-Soung (South Korea) Seol Jae-Min	0–6, 6–3, [10–5]
Win	14–12	Jun 2011	Japan F6, Kashiwa	Futures	Hard	(Indonesia) Christopher Rungkat	(Chinese Taipei) Lee Hsin-Han (Chinese Taipei) Hsieh Cheng-peng	7–6^{(7–2)}, 6–3
Win	15–12	Jun 2011	Japan F7, Tokyo	Futures	Grass	(Indonesia) Christopher Rungkat	(Chinese Taipei) Lee Hsin-Han (Chinese Taipei) Hsieh Cheng-peng	6–4, 6–3
Loss	15–13	Jul 2011	Chinese Taipei F1, Taipei	Futures	Hard	(Japan) Yuichi Ito	(Chinese Taipei) Lee Hsin-Han (Chinese Taipei) Hsieh Cheng-peng	3–6, 2–6
Win	16–13	Oct 2011	Indonesia F4, Jakarta	Futures	Hard	(China) Li Zhe	(India) Rohan Gajjar (India) Yuki Bhambri	6–3, 6–2
Win	17–13	Nov 2011	Chinese Taipei F3, Tainan	Futures	Clay	(Chinese Taipei) Huang Liang-Chi	(Bulgaria) Aleksandar Lazov (Austria) Nikolaus Moser	6–3, 6–4
Win	18–13	Nov 2011	Chinese Taipei F4, Tainan	Futures	Clay	(Chinese Taipei) Huang Liang-Chi	(Japan) Takuto Niki (Japan) Arata Onozawa	6–3, 6–4
Win	19–13	Nov 2011	Toyota, Japan	Challenger	Carpet	(Japan) Hiroki Kondo	(China) Gao Peng (China) Gao Wan	6–4, 6–1
Win	20–13	Mar 2012	Japan F1, Nishitama	Futures	Hard	(Japan) Hiroki Kondo	(China) Gao Peng (China) Gao Wan	7–6^{(7-4)}, 7–5
Loss	20–14	May 2012	Korea F2, Changwon	Futures	Hard	(Chinese Taipei) Huang Liang-Chi	(Australia) Michael Look (Denmark) Frederik Nielsen	2–6, 1–6
Win	21–14	Jun 2012	Korea F3, Gimcheon	Futures	Hard	(Chinese Taipei) Huang Liang-Chi	(United States) Michael McClune (Australia) Nima Roshan	6–3, 6–3
Win	22–14	Jun 2012	China F9, Shenyang	Futures	Hard	(Chinese Taipei) Huang Liang-Chi	(China) Gao Peng (China) Wu Di	7–6^{(7-2)}, 7–5
Loss	22–15	Jul 2012	China F10, Shenyang	Futures	Hard	(Chinese Taipei) Huang Liang-Chi	(China) Gao Xin (China) Li Zhe	4–6, 5–7
Loss	22–16	Oct 2012	Japan F9, Oarai	Futures	Hard	(Japan) Toshihide Matsui	(Japan) Arata Onozawa (South Korea) An Jae-Sung	6–2, 1–6, [6–10]
Win	23–16	Aug 2014	Chinese Taipei F2, Kaohsiung	Futures	Hard	(Chinese Taipei) Wang Chieh-Fu	(Japan) Arata Onozawa (Chinese Taipei) Yang Tsung-Hua	6–3, 6–2
Win	24–16	Feb 2015	Hong Kong Challenger	Challenger	Carpet	(Chinese Taipei) Hsieh Cheng-peng	(India) Sanam Singh (India) Saketh Myneni	6–4, 6–2
Win	25–16	Mar 2015	Chinese Japan F1, Tokyo	Futures	Hard	(Japan) Yuichi Ito	(Japan) Shintaro Imai (Japan) Yuhei Kono	6–3, 3–6, [12–10]
Win	26–16	May 2015	China F5, Wuhan	Futures	Hard	(Chinese Taipei) Huang Liang-Chi	(Japan) Arata Onozawa (China) Bai Yan	4–6, 6–1, [11–9]
Loss	26–17	Jun 2015	Hong Kong F1	Futures	Hard	(China) He Yecong	(Hong Kong) Yeung Pak Long (Chinese Taipei) Hsieh Cheng-peng	6–4, 4–6, [5–10]
Win	27–17	Jun 2015	Hong Kong F2	Futures	Hard	(Chinese Taipei) Huang Liang-Chi	(Chinese Taipei) Hung Jui-Chen (Chinese Taipei) Wang Chieh-Fu	4–6, 7–6^{(7-2)}, [10–6]
Win	28–17	Jun 2015	Hong Kong F3	Futures	Hard	(Chinese Taipei) Hsieh Cheng-peng	(Chinese Taipei) Hung Jui-Chen (Chinese Taipei) Wang Chieh-Fu	6–3, 6–7^{(6-8)}, [10–7]
Win	29–17	Aug 2015	China F13, Putian	Futures	Hard	(China) Bai Yan	(Japan) Bumpei Sato (Japan) Sho Katayama	6–2, 7–6^{(7-4)}
Loss	29–18	Aug 2015	Chinese Taipei F1, Kaohsiung	Futures	Hard	(China) Bai Yan	(Chinese Taipei) Hsieh Cheng-peng (Chinese Taipei) Yang Tsung-Hua	4–6, 6–7^{(5-7)}
Win	30–18	Sep 2015	Shanghai, China	Challenger	Hard	(China) Wu Di	(Italy) Luca Vanni (Italy) Thomas Fabbiano	6–3, 7–5
Loss	30–19	Nov 2015	Yokohama, Japan	Challenger	Hard	(Italy) Riccardo Ghedin	(Thailand) Sonchat Ratiwatana (Thailand) Sanchai Ratiwatana	4–6, 4–6
Loss	30–20	Nov 2015	Toyota, Japan	Challenger	Carpet	(Italy) Riccardo Ghedin	(Australia) Matt Reid (United Kingdom) Brydan Klein	2–6, 6–7^{(3-7)}
Win	31–20	Feb 2016	Kyoto, Japan	Challenger	Hard	(China) Gong Maoxin	(Japan) Go Soeda (Japan) Yasutaka Uchiyama	6–3, 7–6^{(9-7)}
Win	32–20	Mar 2016	Zhuhai, China	Challenger	Hard	(China) Gong Maoxin	(China) Wu Di (Chinese Taipei) Hsieh Cheng-peng	2–6, 6–1, [10-5]
Loss	32–21	May 2016	Seoul, South Korea	Challenger	Hard	(China) Gong Maoxin	(Australia) Matt Reid (Australia) John-Patrick Smith	3–6, 5–7
Loss	32–22	Jun 2016	Hong Kong F1	Futures	Hard	(Chinese Taipei) Huang Liang-Chi	(China) Ning Yuqing (Chinese Taipei) Yu Cheng-Yu	walkover
Win	33–22	Sep 2016	Shanghai, China	Challenger	Hard	(Chinese Taipei) Hsieh Cheng-peng	(China) Gao Xin (China) Li Zhe	7–6^{(8-6)}, 5–7, [10–0]
Loss	33–23	Sep 2016	Taipei, Taiwan	Challenger	Hard	(Chinese Taipei) Hsieh Cheng-peng	(Thailand) Sonchat Ratiwatana (Thailand) Sanchai Ratiwatana	4–6, 6–7^{(4-7)}
Loss	33–24	Mar 2017	Zhuhai, China	Challenger	Hard	(South Africa) Ruan Roelofse	(China) Gong Maoxin (China) Zhang Ze	3–6, 6–7^{(4-7)}
Loss	33–25	May 2017	Gimcheon, South Korea	Challenger	Hard	(South Africa) Ruan Roelofse	(Switzerland) Marco Chiudinelli (Russia) Teymuraz Gabashvili	1–6, 3–6
Win	34–25	Jun 2017	Chinese Taipei F2, Taipei	Futures	Hard	(Chinese Taipei) Chiu Yu Hsiang	(Japan) Shintaro Imai (Japan) Takuto Niki	2–6, 7–6^{(7-5)}, [10–8]
Loss	34–26	Sep 2017	Zhangjiagang, China	Challenger	Hard	(Chinese Taipei) Chen Ti	(China) Gao Xin (China) Zhang Zhizhen	2–6, 3–6
Win	35–26	Sep 2017	Shanghai, China	Challenger	Hard	(Japan) Toshihide Matsui	(United States) Bradley Klahn (Canada) Peter Polansky	7–6^{(7-1)}, 4–6, [10–5]
Loss	35–27	May 2018	Seoul, South Korea	Challenger	Hard	(Chinese Taipei) Chen Ti	(Denmark) Frederik Nielsen (Japan) Toshihide Matsui	4–6, 6–7^{(3-7)}
Loss	35–28	Jul 2018	Hong Kong F1	Futures	Hard	(Philippines) Francis Casey Alcantara	(Hong Kong) Yeung Pak Long (Hong Kong) Wong Chun Hun	4–6, 2–6

== Junior Grand Slam finals ==
=== Doubles: 1 (1 title) ===
Result	Year	Tournament	Surface	Partner	Opponent	Score
Win	2005	Australian Open	Hard	(South Korea) Kim Sun-Yong	(Netherlands) Thiemo de Bakker (United States) Donald Young	6–3, 6–4
