= Cho Soong-jae =

South Korean tennis player (born 1990)

Cho Soong-jae 조숭재
- Country (sports): South Korea
- Residence: Seoul, South Korea
- Born: 20 December 1990 (age 34) Seoul, South Korea
- Retired: 2016 (last match played)
- Plays: Right-handed (two-handed backhand)
- Prize money: $28,949

Singles
- Career record: 1–0 (at ATP Tour level, Grand Slam level, and in Davis Cup)
- Career titles: 2 ITF
- Highest ranking: No. 488 (10 May 2010)

Doubles
- Career record: 1–0 (at ATP Tour level, Grand Slam level, and in Davis Cup)
- Career titles: 2 ITF
- Highest ranking: No. 536 (16 May 2011)

Team competitions
- Davis Cup: 2–0
- Last updated on: 31 December 2024.

- Cho Soong-jae
- Hangul: 조숭재
- RR: Jo Sungjae
- MR: Cho Sungjae

Cho Soong-jae (Korean: 조숭재; born 20 December 1990) is a South Korean former professional tennis player. Cho has a career high ATP singles ranking of world No. 488 achieved on 10 May 2010 and a career high doubles ranking of No. 536, achieved on 16 May 2011. Cho has won two ITF singles titles and two ITF doubles titles.

Cho has represented South Korea at the Davis Cup, where he has a win–loss record of 2–0.
