= Kim Hyun-joon (tennis) =

South Korean tennis player

- Country (sports): South Korea
- Born: 27 October 1987 (age 39) Seoul, South Korea
- Plays: Left-handed
- Prize money: $22,118

Singles
- Career record: 2–1
- Highest ranking: No. 712 (23 June 2008)

Doubles
- Career record: 1–3
- Highest ranking: No. 530 (13 June 2011)

Korean name
- Hangul: 김현준
- RR: Gim Hyeonjun
- MR: Kim Hyŏnjun

Kim Hyun-joon (born 27 October 1987) is a South Korean former professional tennis player.

A left-handed player from Seoul, Kim featured in four Davis Cup ties for South Korea across 2010 and 2011, winning two singles and one doubles rubber. He was a silver medalist in mixed doubles at the 2009 Universiade in Belgrade and was a men's doubles bronze medalist at the 2010 Asian Games, which were held in Guangzhou.

== See also ==
- List of South Korea Davis Cup team representatives
