= Guangdong Olympic Tennis Centre =

Tennis venue in Guangzhou, China

Guangdong Olympic Tennis Centre 广东省奥林匹克网球中心
- Interactive map of Guangdong Olympic Tennis Centre 广东省奥林匹克网球中心
- Location: Guangzhou, Guangdong, China
- Coordinates: 23°08′34″N 113°24′30″E
- Capacity: 11,379 seats 9,534 (Central Court); 1,845 (Court 1)
- Surface: Hard, Outdoors

Construction
- Opened: 2010

The Guangdong Olympic Tennis Centre (Chinese: 广东省奥林匹克网球中心; now known as the Aoti Tennis Centre due to naming rights) is a tennis centre located in Guangzhou, China. It has 13 outdoor tennis courts and can seat 9,534 spectators in its main competition stadium and accommodate 1,845 in a subsidiary hall. It hosted the tennis event at the 2010 Asian Games. It has been the home of Guangzhou International Women's Open from 2015 to 2018.

== See also ==
- Sports in China
