= Kyrgyzstan at the 2010 Asian Games =

- IOC code: KGZ
- NOC: National Olympic Committee of the Republic of Kyrgyzstan

in Guangzhou
- Medals Ranked 25th: Gold 1 Silver 2 Bronze 2 Total 5

Asian Games appearances (overview)
- 1994; 1998; 2002; 2006; 2010; 2014; 2018; 2022; 2026

Kyrgyzstan participated in the 16th Asian Games in Guangzhou from 12 November to 27 November 2010. It won 1 gold, 2 silver and 2 bronze medals.

== Medalists ==
Medal	Name	Sport	Event
Gold	KOBONOV Daniyar	Wrestling	Men's Greco-Roman 74 kg
Silver	WACKER Eugen	Cycling Road	Men's Individual Time Trial
Silver	ZHOLCHUBEKOV Kanybek	Wrestling	Men's Greco-Roman 55 kg
Bronze	KENJEEV Janarbek	Wrestling	Men's Greco-Roman 84 kg
Bronze	Aleksandr Parol	Canoeing	Men's Kayak Single 1000m
