= Uzbekistan at the 2010 Asian Games =

- IOC code: UZB
- NOC: National Olympic Committee of the Republic of Uzbekistan

in Guangzhou
- Medals Ranked 8th: Gold 11 Silver 22 Bronze 23 Total 56

Asian Games appearances (overview)
- 1994; 1998; 2002; 2006; 2010; 2014; 2018; 2022; 2026

Uzbekistan participated in the 2010 Asian Games in Guangzhou from 12 November to 27 November 2010. It won 11 gold, 22 silver and 23 bronze medals.

== Medal table ==
Sport	Gold	Silver	Bronze	Total
Canoe/Kayak Sprint	3	2	2	7
Athletics	2	3	3	8
Wrestling	2	1	1	4
Judo	1	3	3	7
Boxing	1	2	2	5
Chess	1	1	0	2
Cycling	1	0	0	1
Tennis	0	3	0	3
Weightlifting	0	2	0	2
Rhythmic Gymnastics	0	2	0	2
Rowing	0	1	4	5
Taekwondo	0	1	2	3
Artistic Gymnastics	0	1	2	3
Karate	0	0	1	1
Water Polo	0	0	1	1
Shooting	0	0	1	1
Trampoline Gymnastics	0	0	1	1
Total	11	22	23	56

== Medalists ==
Medal	Name	Sport	Event	Date
Gold	Yuliya Tarasova	Athletics	Women's Heptathlon	23 November
Gold	Svetlana Radzivil	Athletics	Women's High Jump	26 November
Gold	Elshod Rasulov	Boxing	Men's 81kg	25 November
Gold	Uzbekistan	Canoe/Kayak Sprint	Men's Kayak Four 1000m	25 November
Gold	Vadim Menkov	Canoe/Kayak Sprint	Men's Canoe Single 1000m	25 November
Gold	Uzbekistan	Canoe/Kayak Sprint	Men's Canoe Double 1000m	25 November
Gold	Rustam Kasimdzhanov	Chess	Men's Individual	16 November
Gold	Rishod Sobirov	Judo	Men's -60kg	16 November
Gold	Dilshod Mansurov	Wrestling	Men's Freestyle 55 kg	23 November
Gold	Artur Taymazov	Wrestling	Men's Freestyle 120 kg	25 November
Silver	Anton Fokin	Gymnastics	Men's Parallel bars	17 November
Silver	Guzel Khubbieva	Athletics	Women's 100m	22 November
Silver	Nadiya Dusanova	Athletics	Women's High Jump	26 November
Silver	Leonid Andreev	Athletics	Men's Pole Vault	22 November
Silver	Uktamjon Rahmonov	Boxing	Men's 69kg	25 November
Silver	Abbos Atoev	Boxing	Men's 75kg	26 November
Silver	Uzbekistan	Canoe/Kayak Sprint	Men's Kayak Double 200m	26 November
Silver	Uzbekistan	Canoe/Kayak Sprint	Women's Kayak Four 500m	25 November
Silver	Uzbekistan	Chess	Women's Team	26 November
Silver	Mirzohid Farmonov	Judo	Men's -66kg	15 November
Silver	Dilshod Choriev	Judo	Men's -90kg	15 November
Silver	Abdullo Tangriev	Judo	Men's +100kg	13 November
Silver	Ulyana Trofimova	Rhythmic Gymnastics	Individual All-Around	26 November
Silver	Uzbekistan	Rhythmic Gymnastics	Team	25 November
Silver	Ruslan Naurzaliev ??	Rowing	Men's Double Sculls	18 November
Silver	Dmitriy Kim	Taekwondo	Men's Under 74kg	17 November
Silver	Denis Istomin	Tennis	Men's Singles	23 November
Silver	Akgul Amanmuradova	Tennis	Women's Singles	23 November
Silver	Uzbekistan	Tennis	Men's Team	16 November
Silver	Ivan Efremov	Weightlifting	Men's 105 kg	19 November
Silver	Mansurbek Chashemov	Weightlifting	Men's 85 kg	17 November
Silver	Kurban Kurbanov	Wrestling	Men's Freestyle 96 kg	25 November
Bronze	Luiza Galiulina	Artistic Gymnastics	Women's Balance Beam	17 November
Bronze	Uzbekistan	Artistic Gymnastics	Women's Team	14 November
Bronze	Guzel Khubbieva	Athletics	Women's 200m	25 November
Bronze	Rinat Tarzumanov	Athletics	Men's Javelin Throw	26 November
Bronze	Yuliya Tarasova	Athletics	Women's Long Jump	23 November
Bronze	Hurshid Tojibaev	Boxing	Men's 60kg	25 November
Bronze	Sanjarbek Rahmanov	Boxing	Men's 64kg	26 November
Bronze	Aleksey Zubarev ?	Canoe/Kayak Slalom	Men's Canoe Double	16 November
Bronze	Alexey Mochalov	Canoe/Kayak Sprint	Men's Canoe Double	16 November
Bronze	Navruz Jurakobilov	Judo	Men's -73kg	13 November
Bronze	Ramziddin Sayidov	Judo	Men's -100kg	13 November
Bronze	Utkir Kurbanov	Judo	Men's Open Category	16 November
Bronze	Utkir Kurbanov	Karate	Women's -61 kg	16 November
Bronze	Zarrina Mihaylova	Rowing	Women's Single Sculls	19 November
Bronze	Uzbekistan	Rowing	Men's Eight	19 November
Bronze	Uzbekistan	Rowing	Men's Four	18 November
Bronze	Artyom Kudryashov	Rowing	Men's Single Sculls	19 November
Bronze	Evgeniya Karimova	Taekwondo	Women's Over 73kg	20 November
Bronze	Akmal Irgashev	Taekwondo	Men's Over 87kg	20 November
Bronze	Ekaterina Khilko	Trampoline Gymnastics	Women's Individual	22 November
Bronze	David Saldadze	Wrestling	Men's Greco-Roman 96 kg	22 November
Bronze	Uzbekistan	Shooting	Women's 10m Air Rifle Team	13 November
Bronze	Uzbekistan	Water Polo	Women's	13 November
